= 1997 Avispa Fukuoka season =

Avispa Fukuoka
1997 season
- Manager: Pachamé
- Stadium: Hakatanomori Football Stadium
- J.League: 17th
- Emperor's Cup: 4th Round
- J.League Cup: GL-E 4th
- Top goalscorer: Yusaku Ueno (8)
Home colours	Away colours

1997 Avispa Fukuoka season

== Competitions ==
Competitions	Position
J.League	17th / 17 clubs
Emperor's Cup	4th round
J.League Cup	GL-E 4th / 4 clubs

== Domestic results ==
=== J.League ===
12 April 1997 1-1	Yokohama Flügels	3-1	Avispa Fukuoka	Yokohama Mitsuzawa Stadium
JST (UTC+09)

16 April 1997 1-2	Avispa Fukuoka	0-1 (GG) (a.e.t.)	Júbilo Iwata	Hakatanomori Football Stadium
JST (UTC+09)

19 April 1997 1-3	Kashiwa Reysol	2-1	Avispa Fukuoka	Hitachi Kashiwa Soccer Stadium
JST (UTC+09)

23 April 1997 1-4	Avispa Fukuoka	0-3	Urawa Red Diamonds	Hakatanomori Football Stadium
JST (UTC+09)

26 April 1997 1-5	Gamba Osaka	0-1	Avispa Fukuoka	Osaka Expo '70 Stadium
JST (UTC+09)

3 May 1997 1-6	Avispa Fukuoka	1-2 (GG) (a.e.t.)	Verdy Kawasaki	Hakatanomori Football Stadium
JST (UTC+09)

7 May 1997 1-7	Kyoto Purple Sanga	1-0	Avispa Fukuoka	Nishikyogoku Athletic Stadium
JST (UTC+09)

10 May 1997 1-8	Avispa Fukuoka	2-1	JEF United Ichihara	Nagasaki Athletic Stadium
JST (UTC+09)

17 May 1997 1-9	Bellmare Hiratsuka	2-1	Avispa Fukuoka	Hiratsuka Athletics Stadium
JST (UTC+09)

24 May 1997 1-10	Avispa Fukuoka	1-3	Yokohama Marinos	Hakatanomori Football Stadium
JST (UTC+09)

28 May 1997 1-11	Shimizu S-Pulse	1-0	Avispa Fukuoka	Nihondaira Sports Stadium
JST (UTC+09)

31 May 1997 1-12	Avispa Fukuoka	0-1	Sanfrecce Hiroshima	Hakatanomori Football Stadium
JST (UTC+09)

1-13	bye

9 July 1997 1-14	Cerezo Osaka	2-0	Avispa Fukuoka	Osaka Nagai Stadium
JST (UTC+09)

12 July 1997 1-15	Avispa Fukuoka	0-1	Vissel Kobe	Hakatanomori Football Stadium
JST (UTC+09)

16 July 1997 1-16	Kashima Antlers	2-0	Avispa Fukuoka	Kashima Soccer Stadium
JST (UTC+09)

19 July 1997 1-17	Avispa Fukuoka	3-2	Nagoya Grampus Eight	Hakatanomori Football Stadium
JST (UTC+09)

30 July 1997 2-1	Avispa Fukuoka	1-3	Kashima Antlers	Hakatanomori Football Stadium
JST (UTC+09)

2 August 1997 2-2	Avispa Fukuoka	0-1 (GG) (a.e.t.)	Yokohama Flügels	Hakatanomori Football Stadium
JST (UTC+09)

6 August 1997 2-3	Júbilo Iwata	2-1	Avispa Fukuoka	Júbilo Iwata Stadium
JST (UTC+09)

9 August 1997 2-4	Avispa Fukuoka	1-1 (GG) (a.e.t.) (5-3 p)	Kashiwa Reysol	Hakatanomori Football Stadium
JST (UTC+09)

16 August 1997 2-5	Urawa Red Diamonds	1-2	Avispa Fukuoka	Urawa Komaba Stadium
JST (UTC+09)

20 August 1997 2-6	Avispa Fukuoka	0-1	Gamba Osaka	Suizenji Stadium
JST (UTC+09)

23 August 1997 2-7	Verdy Kawasaki	2-0	Avispa Fukuoka	Todoroki Athletics Stadium
JST (UTC+09)

30 August 1997 2-8	Avispa Fukuoka	4-2	Kyoto Purple Sanga	Hakatanomori Football Stadium
JST (UTC+09)

3 September 1997 2-9	JEF United Ichihara	2-1	Avispa Fukuoka	Ichihara Seaside Stadium
JST (UTC+09)

6 September 1997 2-10	Avispa Fukuoka	1-2	Bellmare Hiratsuka	Hakatanomori Football Stadium
JST (UTC+09)

10 September 1997 2-11	Vissel Kobe	4-3 (GG) (a.e.t.)	Avispa Fukuoka	Kobe Universiade Memorial Stadium
JST (UTC+09)

13 September 1997 2-12	Yokohama Marinos	4-1	Avispa Fukuoka	Yokohama Mitsuzawa Stadium
JST (UTC+09)

20 September 1997 2-13	Sanfrecce Hiroshima	1-3	Avispa Fukuoka	Hiroshima Big Arch
JST (UTC+09)

24 September 1997 2-14	Avispa Fukuoka	0-1 (GG) (a.e.t.)	Shimizu S-Pulse	Hakatanomori Football Stadium
JST (UTC+09)

2-15	bye

1 October 1997 2-16	Avispa Fukuoka	0-2	Cerezo Osaka	Hakatanomori Football Stadium
JST (UTC+09)

4 October 1997 2-17	Nagoya Grampus Eight	2-0	Avispa Fukuoka	Mizuho Athletic Stadium
JST (UTC+09)

=== Emperor's Cup ===
1st Round	bye

2nd Round	bye

14 December 1997 3rd Round	Verdy Kawasaki	0-2	Avispa Fukuoka	Todoroki Athletics Stadium
JST (UTC+09)

20 December 1997 4th Round	Kashima Antlers	6-0	Avispa Fukuoka	Kagoshima Kamoike Stadium
JST (UTC+09)

=== J.League Cup ===
8 March 1997 GL-E-1	Kyoto Purple Sanga	1-0	Avispa Fukuoka	Nishikyogoku Athletic Stadium
JST (UTC+09)

15 March 1997 GL-E-2	Avispa Fukuoka	1-1	Yokohama Flügels	Hakatanomori Football Stadium
JST (UTC+09)

19 March 1997 GL-E-3	Avispa Fukuoka	1-1	Júbilo Iwata	Hakatanomori Football Stadium
JST (UTC+09)

22 March 1997 GL-E-4	Yokohama Flügels	1-0	Avispa Fukuoka	Yokohama Mitsuzawa Stadium
JST (UTC+09)

26 March 1997 GL-E-5	Júbilo Iwata	4-2	Avispa Fukuoka	Júbilo Iwata Stadium
JST (UTC+09)

29 March 1997 GL-E-6	Avispa Fukuoka	2-2	Kyoto Purple Sanga	Hakatanomori Football Stadium
JST (UTC+09)

== Player statistics ==
No.	Pos.	Nat.	Player	D.o.B. (Age)	Height / Weight	J.League		Emperor's Cup		J.League Cup		Total	
No.	Pos.	Nat.	Player	D.o.B. (Age)	Height / Weight	Apps	Goals	Apps	Goals	Apps	Goals	Apps	Goals
1	GK	(Japan)	Hideki Tsukamoto	August 9, 1973 (aged 23)	179 cm / 73 kg	11	0	0	0	6	0	17	0
2	DF	(Japan)	Hideaki Mori	October 16, 1972 (aged 24)	183 cm / 77 kg	27	1	3	0	6	0	36	1
3	DF	(Argentina)	Vázquez	November 23, 1965 (aged 31)	183 cm / 73 kg	20	0	0	0	6	0	26	0
4	DF	(Japan)	Atsuhiro Iwai	January 31, 1967 (aged 30)	177 cm / 66 kg	8	0	3	0	0	0	11	0
5	DF	(Japan)	Satoshi Tsunami	August 14, 1961 (aged 35)	173 cm / 69 kg	0	0	0	0	0	0	0	0
6	DF	(Japan)	Masayuki Nakagomi	August 17, 1967 (aged 29)	173 cm / 69 kg	14	0	0	0	0	0	14	0
7	DF	(Japan)	Osamu Umeyama	August 16, 1973 (aged 23)	177 cm / 67 kg	25	0	3	0	1	0	29	0
8	MF	(Japan)	Kiyotaka Ishimaru	October 30, 1973 (aged 23)	174 cm / 68 kg	29	4	3	2	6	0	38	6
9	FW	(Japan)	Yoshiteru Yamashita	November 21, 1977 (aged 19)	178 cm / 69 kg	13	3	3	0	6	0	22	3
10	MF	(Argentina)	Riep	February 20, 1976 (aged 21)	170 cm / 68 kg	11	0	0	0	5	1	16	1
11	MF	(Japan)	Atsushi Nagai	December 23, 1974 (aged 22)	176 cm / 70 kg	16	0	0	0	3	0	19	0
12	DF	(Japan)	Keiju Karashima	June 24, 1971 (aged 25)	183 cm / 75 kg	1	0	0	0	0	0	1	0
13	MF/DF	(Japan)	Ichizo Nakata	April 19, 1973 (aged 23)	174 cm / 70 kg	10	0	0	0	5	0	15	0
14	DF	(Japan)	Yoshinori Furube	December 9, 1970 (aged 26)	181 cm / 69 kg	32	0	3	0	6	0	41	0
15	MF	(Japan)	Tadahiro Akiba	October 13, 1975 (aged 21)	173 cm / 67 kg	0	0	0	0	3	0	3	0
16	GK	(Japan)	Tomoaki Sano	April 14, 1968 (aged 28)	182 cm / 80 kg	16	0	3	0	0	0	19	0
17	DF	(Japan)	Takeshi Nakashima	January 15, 1976 (aged 21)	180 cm / 76 kg	0	0		0	0	0		0
18	MF	(Japan)	Chikara Fujimoto	October 31, 1977 (aged 19)	168 cm / 66 kg	1	0	2	0	0	0	3	0
19	MF	(Japan)	Masashi Miyamura	February 18, 1969 (aged 28)	170 cm / 65 kg	1	0	0	0	1	0	2	0
20	FW	(Japan)	Yusaku Ueno	November 1, 1973 (aged 23)	182 cm / 74 kg	31	8	3	1	5	1	39	10
21	GK	(Japan)	Kiyoto Furushima	April 3, 1968 (aged 28)	187 cm / 80 kg	0	0		0	0	0		0
23	MF	(Japan)	Yoshiyuki Shinoda	June 18, 1971 (aged 25)	168 cm / 66 kg	29	0	3	0	4	0	36	0
24	MF	(Japan)	Tatsunori Hisanaga	December 23, 1977 (aged 19)	172 cm / 66 kg	19	1	2	0	1	0	22	1
25	DF	(Japan)	Masaharu Nishi	May 29, 1977 (aged 19)	181 cm / 68 kg	15	0	0	0	1	0	16	0
26	DF	(Japan)	Koji Sato	August 24, 1977 (aged 19)	179 cm / 72 kg	0	0		0	0	0		0
27	MF	(Japan)	Daisuke Nakaharai	May 22, 1977 (aged 19)	172 cm / 63 kg	27	2	3	0	6	1	36	3
28	MF	(Japan)	Shoji Ikitsu	May 20, 1977 (aged 19)	162 cm / 50 kg	8	0	0	0	0	0	8	0
29	FW	(Japan)	Daisuke Fujimoto	April 12, 1977 (aged 19)	176 cm / 64 kg	0	0		0	0	0		0
30	GK	(Japan)	Satoshi Fujimoto	June 19, 1976 (aged 20)	183 cm / 80 kg	0	0		0	0	0		0
31	DF	(Japan)	Takuji Miyoshi	August 20, 1978 (aged 18)	179 cm / 70 kg	0	0		0	0	0		0
32	MF	(Japan)	Takanobu Kondo	August 8, 1978 (aged 18)	180 cm / 72 kg	0	0		0	0	0		0
33	MF	(Japan)	Takefumi Sasaki	July 5, 1978 (aged 18)	170 cm / 65 kg	0	0		0	0	0		0
34	FW	(Japan)	Yoshiyuki Takemoto	October 3, 1973 (aged 23)	181 cm / 71 kg	7	0	0	0	1	1	8	1
35	MF	(Argentina)	Carracedo	April 16, 1970 (aged 26)	170 cm / 67 kg	5	0	0	0	5	0	10	0
22	FW	(Argentina)	Rossi †	February 22, 1977 (aged 20)	175 cm / 73 kg	11	0	0	0	0	0	11	0
34	FW	(Nigeria)	Obiku †	September 24, 1968 (aged 28)	-cm / -kg	15	7	3	1	0	0	18	8
35	FW	(Spain)	Pablo †	January 18, 1971 (aged 26)	-cm / -kg	12	3	3	0	0	0	15	3
36	GK	(Japan)	Tomoyasu Ando †	May 23, 1974 (aged 22)	182 cm / 73 kg	7	0	0	0	0	0	7	0

- † player(s) joined the team after the opening of this season.

== Transfers ==
In:

No.	Pos.	Nation	Player
3	DF	ARG	Sergio Fabián Vázquez (from Banfield)
12	DF	JPN	Keiju Karashima (from Gamba Osaka)
17	DF	JPN	Takeshi Nakashima (from Urawa Red Diamonds)
31	DF	JPN	Takuji Miyoshi (from Kunimi High School)
10	MF	ARG	Rodrigo Sebastián Riep (from River Plate)
15	MF	JPN	Tadahiro Akiba (from JEF United Ichihara)
32	MF	JPN	Takanobu Kondo (from Tokai University Daigo Senior High School)
33	MF	JPN	Takefumi Sasaki (from Tokai University Daigo Senior High School)
35	MF	ARG	Marcelo Carracedo Garcia (from Atlético Morelia)
34	FW	JPN	Yoshiyuki Takemoto (from Tokyo Gas)

Out:

No.	Pos.	Nation	Player
—	GK	JPN	Yuji Keigoshi (to Kyoto Purple Sanga)
—	DF	JPN	Yoshikazu Isoda
—	DF	ARG	Mayor
—	DF	JPN	Daiji Nii
—	MF	ARG	Troglio
—	MF	JPN	Shuta Sonoda
—	MF	JPN	Takeshi Hibi
—	FW	JPN	Takahiro Endo
—	FW	ARG	Maradona
—	FW	JPN	Motonobu Tako
—	FW	PAR	Báez

== Transfers during the season ==
=== In ===
- (Argentina) Julio Hernán Rossi (on April)
- (Nigeria) Michael Edirin Obiku (from Real Mallorca on July)
- (Spain) Pablo José Maqueda Andrés (from Real Oviedo on July)
- (Japan) Tomoyasu Ando (loan from Urawa Red Diamonds on September)

=== Out ===
- (Japan) Satoshi Tsunami (to Bellmare Hiratsuka)
- (Argentina) Carracedo (on June)
- (Argentina) Riep (on August)

== Awards ==
none

== Other pages ==
- (in Japanese) J. League official site
- (in Japanese) Avispa Fukuoka official site
