= Kiyoto Furushima =

Japanese footballer

Kiyoto Furushima 古島 清人
Personal information
- Full name: Kiyoto Furushima
- Date of birth: April 3, 1968 (age 58)
- Place of birth: Yatsushiro, Kumamoto, Japan
- Height: 1.87 m (6 ft 1 1/2 in)
- Position: Goalkeeper

Youth career
- 1984–1986: Kunimi High School

Senior career*
Years	Team	Apps	(Gls)
1987–1995	Bellmare Hiratsuka	87	(0)
1996–1997	Avispa Fukuoka	0	(0)
1998	Omiya Ardija	26	(0)
1999–2000	NTT Kumamoto		
Total		113	(0)
Medal record
Bellmare Hiratsuka
Winner	Emperor's Cup	1994
Runner-up	Emperor's Cup	1988
- * Club domestic league appearances and goals

Kiyoto Furushima (古島 清人, Furushima Kiyoto; born April 3, 1968) is a former Japanese football player.

== Playing career ==
Furushima was born in Yatsushiro on April 3, 1968. After graduating from high school, he joined Fujita Industries (later Bellmare Hiratsuka) in 1987. He played many matches as goalkeeper from 1989. The club won the champions in 1993 and was promoted to J1 League from 1994. However he could hardly play in the match behind Nobuyuki Kojima from 1994. In 1996, he moved to Avispa Fukuoka. However he could not play at all in the match behind Hideki Tsukamoto. In 1998, he moved to Japan Football League club Omiya Ardija. He played as regular goalkeeper in 1 season. In 1999, he moved to Regional Leagues club NTT Kyushu (later NTT Kumamoto) based in his local Kumamoto Prefecture. He retired end of 2000 season.

== Club statistics ==
Club performance			League		Cup		League Cup		Total	
Season	Club	League	Apps	Goals	Apps	Goals	Apps	Goals	Apps	Goals
Japan			League		Emperor's Cup		J.League Cup		Total	
1987/88	Fujita Industries	JSL Division 1	0	0					0	0
1988/89	Fujita Industries	JSL Division 1	0	0					0	0
1989/90	Fujita Industries	JSL Division 1	11	0			0	0	11	0
1990/91	Fujita Industries	JSL Division 2	1	0			0	0	1	0
1991/92	Fujita Industries	JSL Division 2	30	0			3	0	33	0
1992	Fujita Industries	Football League	18	0			-		18	0
1993	Fujita Industries	Football League	18	0			6	0	24	0
1994	Bellmare Hiratsuka	J1 League	3	0	1	0	0	0	4	0
1995	Bellmare Hiratsuka	J1 League	6	0	0	0	-		6	0
1996	Avispa Fukuoka	J1 League	0	0			0	0	0	0
1997	Avispa Fukuoka	J1 League	0	0			0	0	0	0
1998	Omiya Ardija	Football League	26	0	3	0	-		29	0
Total			113	0	4	0	9	0	126	0
