= 1996 Avispa Fukuoka season =

Avispa Fukuoka
1996 season
- Manager: Hidehiko Shimizu
- Stadium: Hakatanomori Football Stadium
- J.League: 15th
- Emperor's Cup: 4th Round
- J.League Cup: GL-B 8th
- Top goalscorer: Troglio (10)
- Highest home attendance: 17,323 (vs Urawa Red Diamonds, 20 March 1996)
- Lowest home attendance: 5,309 (vs JEF United Ichihara, 16 October 1996)
- Average home league attendance: 9,737
Home colours	Away colours

1996 Avispa Fukuoka season

== Review and events ==
=== League results summary ===
Overall								Home						Away					
Pld	W	D	L	GF	GA	GD	Pts	W	D	L	GF	GA	GD	W	D	L	GF	GA	GD
30	9	0	21	42	64	−22	29	2	0	13	18	38	−20	7	0	8	24	26	−2

Source: J.LEAGUE OFFICIAL GUIDE 1997. ISBN 4-09-102329-0.

=== League results by round ===
Round	1	2	3	4	5	6	7	8	9	10	11	12	13	14	15	16	17	18	19	20	21	22	23	24	25	26	27	28	29	30
Ground	A	H	A	H	A	H	A	H	A	A	H	H	A	A	H	A	H	H	A	H	A	H	A	H	A	H	A	H	A	H
Result	L	L	L	L	W	L	W	L	W	W	L	L	L	L	L	W	L	W	L	L	L	L	W	W	L	L	L	L	W	L
Position	16	15	15	15	13	15	13	14	14	13	13	15	15	15	15	14	14	13	13	13	14	14	14	13	14	14	15	15	15	15

Source: J.LEAGUE OFFICIAL GUIDE 1997. ISBN 4-09-102329-0.
A = Away; H = Home; W = Win; D = Draw; L = Loss

== Competitions ==
Competitions	Position
J.League	15th / 16 clubs
Emperor's Cup	4th round
J.League Cup	GL-B 8th / 8 clubs

== Domestic results ==
=== J.League ===
16 March 1996 1	Júbilo Iwata	3–0	Avispa Fukuoka	Júbilo Iwata Stadium
16:04 JST (UTC+09)	Nakayama 48', 89'; Fujita 89'	J.League		Attendance: 13,439; Referee: Hiroyuki Umemoto; Assistant referees: Hiroshi Fukuda, Yasushi Tsuchimoto; Fourth official: Toshiaki Futamata

20 March 1996 2	Avispa Fukuoka	1–2 (V-goal) (a.e.t.)	Urawa Red Diamonds	Hakatanomori Football Stadium
14:00 JST (UTC+09)	Furube 54'	J.League	Hirose 57' 113'	Attendance: 17,323; Referee: Kenji Tanaka; Assistant referees: Yoshikazu Hiroshima, Tōru Yamashiro; Fourth official: Daikichi Kanada

23 March 1996 3	Nagoya Grampus Eight	3–1	Avispa Fukuoka	Nagoya Mizuho Athletics Stadium
19:02 JST (UTC+09)	Moriyama 2', 12'; Hirano 57'	J.League	Troglio 45'	Attendance: 20,793; Referee: Fumikazu Shioyazono; Assistant referees: Hiroyuki Izumi, Masatoshi Shibata; Fourth official: Motoyoshi Matsumoto

30 March 1996 4	Avispa Fukuoka	1–2 (V-goal) (a.e.t.)	Verdy Kawasaki	Hakatanomori Football Stadium
19:00 JST (UTC+09)	Troglio 89'	J.League	Kitazawa 30'; K. Miura 94'	Attendance: 16,328; Referee: Hiroshi Tanabe; Assistant referees: Morihisa Yamaguchi, Hideaki Harada; Fourth official: Ryōichi Imamura

3 April 1996 5	JEF United Ichihara	0–1	Avispa Fukuoka	Ichihara Stadium
19:01 JST (UTC+09)		J.League	Maradona 29'	Attendance: 8,028; Referee: Shinichirō Obata; Assistant referees: Yū Nakamura, Takao Onshi; Fourth official: Kōji Sugikawa

6 April 1996 6	Avispa Fukuoka	2–4	Kashima Antlers	Hakatanomori Football Stadium
14:03 JST (UTC+09)	Troglio 35'; Nagai 64'	J.League	Hasegawa 21'; Kurosaki 23', 27'; Leonardo 28'	Attendance: 11,087; Referee: Zoran Petrović; Assistant referees: Naoki Esumi, Takayoshi Kashino; Fourth official: Ryōichi Imamura

13 April 1996 7	Cerezo Osaka	1–2	Avispa Fukuoka	Osaka Nagai No.2 Stadium
15:05 JST (UTC+09)	Yonekura 81'	J.League	Troglio 0', 77'	Attendance: 7,096; Referee: Archundia; Assistant referees: Sōichirō Kaneko, Akio Okutani; Fourth official: Tsuyoshi Miyake

17 April 1996 8	Avispa Fukuoka	3–4	Yokohama Flügels	Hakatanomori Football Stadium
19:00 JST (UTC+09)	Maradona 4'; Nagai 16'; Ueno 47'	J.League	Evair 21', 83'; Miura 67'; Hattori 89'	Attendance: 10,551; Referee: Tōru Kamikawa; Assistant referees: Hiroyuki Izumi, Takashi Aoki; Fourth official: Daikichi Kanada

20 April 1996 9	Shimizu S-Pulse	0–2	Avispa Fukuoka	Nihondaira Sports Stadium
15:04 JST (UTC+09)		J.League	Troglio 49'; Maradona 56'	Attendance: 14,011; Referee: Piotr Werner; Assistant referees: Takashi Kunori, Takao Onshi; Fourth official: Naoki Uchiyama

27 April 1996 10	Kyoto Purple Sanga	0–3	Avispa Fukuoka	Kyoto Nishikyogoku Stadium
15:03 JST (UTC+09)		J.League	37' (o.g.); Yamashita 77'; Ueno 83'	Attendance: 7,664; Referee: Zoran Petrović; Assistant referees: Sōichirō Kaneko, Kōji Minami; Fourth official: Hiroyuki Ishida

1 May 1996 11	Avispa Fukuoka	0–2	Sanfrecce Hiroshima	Kumamoto Suizenji Stadium
19:00 JST (UTC+09)		J.League	Huistra 47'; Moriyasu 82'	Attendance: 7,895; Referee: Archundia; Assistant referees: Tōru Yamashiro, Takayoshi Kashino; Fourth official: Kōji Uehara

4 May 1996 12	Avispa Fukuoka	0–4	Bellmare Hiratsuka	Hakatanomori Football Stadium
15:04 JST (UTC+09)		J.League	Harasaki 2', 19'; Noguchi 12'; Simão 86'	Attendance: 11,286; Referee: Yoshimi Ogawa; Assistant referees: Kazuya Yanagisawa, Takashi Aoki; Fourth official: Daikichi Kanada

11 May 1996 13	Kashiwa Reysol	5–2	Avispa Fukuoka	Hitachi Kashiwa Soccer Stadium
14:59 JST (UTC+09)	Edílson 14', 44'; Valdir 39'; Katanosaka 48'; N. Katō 87'	J.League	Endō 83'; Troglio 88'	Attendance: 11,229; Referee: Kenji Tanaka; Assistant referees: Kazuhisa Osada, Akihisa Makino; Fourth official: Kaoru Nagase

15 May 1996 14	Gamba Osaka	3–0	Avispa Fukuoka	Expo '70 Commemorative Stadium
19:00 JST (UTC+09)	Gillhaus 49'; Morioka 63'; Škrinjar 87'	J.League		Attendance: 5,389; Referee: Zoran Petrović; Assistant referees: Takayoshi Kashino, Takuji Fukazawa; Fourth official: Tamotsu Ōnishi

18 May 1996 15	Avispa Fukuoka	0–1	Yokohama Marinos	Hakatanomori Football Stadium
15:03 JST (UTC+09)		J.League	Endō 29'	Attendance: 14,295; Referee: Piotr Werner; Assistant referees: Kazuya Yanagisawa, Tōru Yamashiro; Fourth official: Daikichi Kanada

28 August 1996 16	Bellmare Hiratsuka	1–4	Avispa Fukuoka	Hiratsuka Stadium
19:00 JST (UTC+09)	Nakata 85'	J.League	Endō 22'; Maradona 55'; Sonoda 67'; Troglio 77'	Attendance: 5,539; Referee: Yoshitsugu Katayama; Assistant referees: Kazuaki Hamaguchi, Takayoshi Kashino; Fourth official: Kazuhiko Uchida

31 August 1996 17	Avispa Fukuoka	4–5 (V-goal) (a.e.t.)	Kashiwa Reysol	Hakatanomori Football Stadium
18:30 JST (UTC+09)	Mori 5'; Ueno 10'; Troglio 26'; Maradona 65'	J.League	Date 17'; Edílson 37'; Sakai 66', 69'; N. Katō 103'	Attendance: 7,174; Referee: Kiyoshi Ōta; Assistant referees: Toshimitsu Yoshida, Masatoshi Shibata; Fourth official: Daikichi Kanada

7 September 1996 18	Avispa Fukuoka	1–0	Gamba Osaka	Hakatanomori Football Stadium
18:29 JST (UTC+09)	23' (o.g.)	J.League		Attendance: 6,596; Referee: Shinichirō Obata; Assistant referees: Noboru Ishiyama, Hideaki Harada; Fourth official: Daikichi Kanada

14 September 1996 19	Yokohama Marinos	0–0 (V-goal) (a.e.t.) (3–1 p)	Avispa Fukuoka	Nagasaki Stadium
18:34 JST (UTC+09)		J.League		Attendance: 10,268; Referee: Bemard Saules; Assistant referees: Hiroyuki Izumi, Hiroyuki Ōnishi; Fourth official: Ryōichi Kanasaki
	Penalties
	(penalty scored) Noda; (penalty scored) Miura; (penalty scored) M. Suzuki; (penalty missed) T. Suzuki		(penalty scored) Mayor; (penalty missed) Mori; (penalty missed) Ishimaru; (penalty missed) Nakagomi

21 September 1996 20	Avispa Fukuoka	1–3	Júbilo Iwata	Hakatanomori Football Stadium
15:00 JST (UTC+09)	Báez 44'	J.League	34' (o.g.); Vanenburg 59', 70'	Attendance: 8,287; Referee: Kazuo Kakihana; Assistant referees: Masatoshi Shibata, Kazuhiko Matsumura; Fourth official: Ryōichi Imamura

28 September 1996 21	Urawa Red Diamonds	1–1 (V-goal) (a.e.t.) (3–2 p)	Avispa Fukuoka	Sapporo Atsubetsu Stadium
13:03 JST (UTC+09)	Okano 1'	J.League	Mayor 3'	Attendance: 5,611; Referee: Zoran Petrović; Assistant referees: Mitsuru Satō, Keiji Kamiara; Fourth official: Eiji Kaneda
	Penalties
	(penalty scored) Hirose; (penalty scored) Buchwald; (penalty scored) Taguchi; (penalty missed) Okano		(penalty scored) Mayor; (penalty missed) Mori; (penalty scored) Iwai; (penalty missed) Umeyama; (penalty missed) Báez

2 October 1996 22	Avispa Fukuoka	1–3	Nagoya Grampus Eight	Kumamoto Suizenji Stadium
19:00 JST (UTC+09)	Báez 56'	J.League	Mochizuki 12'; Durix 35'; 60' (o.g.)	Attendance: 7,247; Referee: Leslie Mottram; Assistant referees: Tōru Yamashiro, Kōji Taniuchi; Fourth official: Kōji Uehara

5 October 1996 23	Verdy Kawasaki	1–2 (V-goal) (a.e.t.)	Avispa Fukuoka	Kawasaki Todoroki Stadium
15:02 JST (UTC+09)	Kurihara 75'	J.League	Ueno 60'; Maradona 101'	Attendance: 14,446; Referee: Yoshimi Ogawa; Assistant referees: Kazuhisa Osada, Ichirō Inukai; Fourth official: Takatoshi Itō

16 October 1996 24	Avispa Fukuoka	3–2	JEF United Ichihara	Hakatanomori Football Stadium
19:01 JST (UTC+09)	Ishimaru 20'; Ueno 27'; Maradona 49'	J.League	Jō 26', 89'	Attendance: 5,309; Referee: Zoran Petrović; Assistant referees: Hiroyuki Izumi, Takuji Fukazawa; Fourth official: Ryōichi Imamura

19 October 1996 25	Kashima Antlers	3–1	Avispa Fukuoka	Kashima Soccer Stadium
15:00 JST (UTC+09)	Masuda 43'; Rodrigo 66'; Manaka 73'	J.League	Maradona 28'	Attendance: 15,976; Referee: Yasuhiro Matsuzaki; Assistant referees: Yū Nakamura, Takao Onshi; Fourth official: Yasushi Komuro

26 October 1996 26	Avispa Fukuoka	0–1	Cerezo Osaka	Hakatanomori Football Stadium
15:00 JST (UTC+09)		J.League	Yokoyama 84'	Attendance: 5,351; Referee: Tatsumi Ōno; Assistant referees: Morihisa Yamaguchi, Akihisa Makino; Fourth official: Daikichi Kanada

30 October 1996 27	Yokohama Flügels	3–1	Avispa Fukuoka	Yokohama Mitsuzawa Football Stadium
19:03 JST (UTC+09)	Evair 5', 67', 75'	J.League	Báez 33'	Attendance: 5,321; Referee: Leslie Mottram; Assistant referees: Toshiyuki Mayuzumi, Kenichi Koshiyama; Fourth official: Tasuku Onodera

2 November 1996 28	Avispa Fukuoka	1–3	Shimizu S-Pulse	Hakatanomori Football Stadium
15:00 JST (UTC+09)	Troglio 89'	J.League	Saitō 32'; Sawanobori 57', 75'	Attendance: 5,616; Referee: Kazuo Kakihana; Assistant referees: Satoru Kawano, Masatoshi Shibata; Fourth official: Ryōichi Imamura

6 November 1996 29	Sanfrecce Hiroshima	2–4	Avispa Fukuoka	Hiroshima Big Arch
19:03 JST (UTC+09)	Moriyasu 53', 88'	J.League	Yamashita 30'; Mayor 48'; Ueno 66', 79'	Attendance: 4,491; Referee: Bemard Saules; Assistant referees: Hiroyuki Izumi, Takashi Aoki; Fourth official: Norio Kuriyama

9 November 1996 30	Avispa Fukuoka	0–2	Kyoto Purple Sanga	Hakatanomori Football Stadium
14:34 JST (UTC+09)		J.League	Matsuhashi 24'; Edmílson 32'	Attendance: 11,710; Referee: Fumikazu Shioyazono; Assistant referees: Hideaki Harada, Kazuhiko Matsumura; Fourth official: Daikichi Kanada

=== Emperor's Cup ===
1st Round	bye

2nd Round	bye

17 November 1996 3rd Round	Avispa Fukuoka	3–1	Honda	Hakatanomori Football Stadium
: JST (UTC+09)	? ?' ? ?' ? ?'		? ?'

23 December 1996 4th Round	Avispa Fukuoka	0–2	Kashima Antlers	Hakatanomori Football Stadium
: JST (UTC+09)			? ?' ? ?'

=== J.League Cup ===
1 June 1996 GL-B-1-1	JEF United Ichihara	0–1	Avispa Fukuoka	Ichihara Stadium
19:00 JST (UTC+09)		J.League	Troglio 50'	Attendance: 9,964; Referee: Tetsuya Hamana; Assistant referees: Kazuhisa Osada, Susumu Takeda; Fourth official: Masahiko Tsuma

5 June 1996 GL-B-1-2	Avispa Fukuoka	0–2 (1–2 agg.)	JEF United Ichihara	Hakatanomori Football Stadium
19:00 JST (UTC+09)		J.League	Maslovar 40'; Hiroyama 57'	Attendance: 6,227; Referee: Kenji Tanaka; Assistant referees: Hideaki Harada, Kazuhiko Matsumura; Fourth official: Daikichi Kanada

8 June 1996 GL-B-2-1	Avispa Fukuoka	0–0	Kashima Antlers	Hakatanomori Football Stadium
18:30 JST (UTC+09)		J.League		Attendance: 9,125; Referee: Fumikazu Shioyazono; Assistant referees: Takashi Kunori, Satoru Kawano; Fourth official: Ryōichi Imamura

12 June 1996 GL-B-2-2	Kashima Antlers	2–0 (2–0 agg.)	Avispa Fukuoka	Kashima Soccer Stadium
19:00 JST (UTC+09)	Yanagisawa 48'; Leonardo 82'	J.League		Attendance: 14,915; Referee: Tōru Kamikawa; Assistant referees: Hiroshi Fukuda, Kō Ōishi; Fourth official: Masahiro Kaneda

15 June 1996 GL-B-3-1	Shimizu S-Pulse	3–1	Avispa Fukuoka	Nihondaira Sports Stadium
16:04 JST (UTC+09)	Massaro 22'; Nagai 31'; Oliva 55'	J.League	Maradona 89'	Attendance: 13,079; Referee: Keiichi Sunakawa; Assistant referees: Kazuya Yanagisawa, Akio Okutani; Fourth official: Masakazu Hōjō

19 June 1996 GL-B-3-2	Avispa Fukuoka	0–1 (1–4 agg.)	Shimizu S-Pulse	Hakatanomori Football Stadium
19:01 JST (UTC+09)		J.League	Hasegawa 80'	Attendance: 6,519; Referee: Hiroshi Tanabe; Assistant referees: Hideaki Harada, Kazuhiko Matsumura; Fourth official: Daikichi Kanada

22 June 1996 GL-B-4-1	Avispa Fukuoka	1–1	Yokohama Flügels	Nagasaki Stadium
18:31 JST (UTC+09)	Ishimaru 5'	J.League	Y. Moriyama 46'	Attendance: 10,085; Referee: Shinichirō Obata; Assistant referees: Kōji Minami, Masaaki Shimomura; Fourth official: Naohito Ogawa

26 June 1996 GL-B-4-2	Yokohama Flügels	4–1 (5–2 agg.)	Avispa Fukuoka	Yokohama Mitsuzawa Football Stadium
19:00 JST (UTC+09)	Yamaguchi 14'; Maezono 35'; Zinho 69'; Sampaio 89'	J.League	Maradona 57'	Attendance: 4,503; Referee: Yoshimi Ogawa; Assistant referees: Yū Nakamura, Satoru Ishizawa; Fourth official: Jōji Kashihara

29 June 1996 GL-B-5-1	Avispa Fukuoka	2–2	Cerezo Osaka	Hakatanomori Football Stadium
18:30 JST (UTC+09)	48' (o.g.); Takemoto 66'	J.League	Nishizawa 44'; Yonekura 89'	Attendance: 6,354; Referee: Kazuo Kakihana; Assistant referees: Tōru Yamashiro, Satoru Kawano; Fourth official: Daikichi Kanada

3 July 1996 GL-B-5-2	Cerezo Osaka	8–1 (10–3 agg.)	Avispa Fukuoka	Osaka Nagai No.2 Stadium
19:00 JST (UTC+09)	Nishizawa 1', 11'; Yonekura 27'; Narcizio 36'; Kanda 43'; Marquinhos 52'; Morishima 70', 77'	J.League	Fujimoto 84'	Attendance: 5,771; Referee: Yoshitsugu Katayama; Assistant referees: Kazuya Yanagisawa, Kazuhisa Osada; Fourth official: Tamotsu Ōnishi

10 August 1996 GL-B-6-1	Avispa Fukuoka	1–0	Nagoya Grampus Eight	Hakatanomori Football Stadium
18:31 JST (UTC+09)	Yamashita 84'	J.League		Attendance: 10,480; Referee: Naotsugu Fuse; Assistant referees: Naoki Esumi, Kazuhiko Matsumura; Fourth official: Syungo Matsufuji

14 August 1996 GL-B-6-2	Nagoya Grampus Eight	3–3 (3–4 agg.)	Avispa Fukuoka	Nagoya Mizuho Athletics Stadium
19:03 JST (UTC+09)	Asano 2'; Hirano 54'; Moriyama 76'	J.League	Yamashita 20'; Ishimaru 39'; Troglio 59'	Attendance: 17,611; Referee: Kenji Tanaka; Assistant referees: Naoyuki Mori, Akio Okutani; Fourth official: Hisao Sugata

17 August 1996 GL-B-7-1	Avispa Fukuoka	2–5	Verdy Kawasaki	Hakatanomori Football Stadium
18:31 JST (UTC+09)	Maradona 47', 74'	J.League	Magrão 24'; Kitazawa 33', 59'; K. Miura 52', 69'	Attendance: 12,932; Referee: Hiroyuki Umemoto; Assistant referees: Noboru Ishiyama, Masatoshi Shibata; Fourth official: Syungo Matsufuji

21 August 1996 GL-B-7-2	Verdy Kawasaki	0–1 (5–3 agg.)	Avispa Fukuoka	Kawasaki Todoroki Stadium
19:00 JST (UTC+09)		J.League	Endō 49'	Attendance: 12,483; Referee: Leslie Mottram; Assistant referees: Satoru Ishizawa, Takuji Fukazawa; Fourth official: Haruo Imai

== Player statistics ==
Pos.	Nat.	Player	D.o.B. (Age)	Height / Weight	J.League		Emperor's Cup		J.League Cup		Total	
Pos.	Nat.	Player	D.o.B. (Age)	Height / Weight	Apps	Goals	Apps	Goals	Apps	Goals	Apps	Goals
DF	(Japan)	Satoshi Tsunami	August 14, 1961 (aged 34)	173 cm / 69 kg	21	0	1	0	11	0	33	0
GK	(Japan)	Yūji Keigoshi	September 17, 1963 (aged 32)	184 cm / 78 kg	6	0	0	0	0	0	6	0
DF	(Japan)	Yoshikazu Isoda	May 27, 1965 (aged 30)	187 cm / 77 kg	4	0	0	0	0	0	4	0
MF	(Argentina)	Troglio	July 28, 1965 (aged 30)	176 cm / 75 kg	27	10	1	0	14	2	42	12
DF	(Argentina)	Mayor	October 5, 1965 (aged 30)	180 cm / 77 kg	26	2	0	0	9	0	35	2
DF	(Japan)	Atsuhiro Iwai	January 31, 1967 (aged 29)	177 cm / 66 kg	20	0	2	0	14	0	36	0
DF	(Japan)	Masayuki Nakagomi	August 17, 1967 (aged 28)	173 cm / 70 kg	14	0	0	0	14	0	28	0
GK	(Japan)	Kiyoto Furushima	April 3, 1968 (aged 27)	187 cm / 79 kg	0	0		0	0	0		0
GK	(Japan)	Tomoaki Sano	April 14, 1968 (aged 27)	182 cm / 78 kg	7	0	0	0	0	0	7	0
FW	(Japan)	Takahiro Endō	July 7, 1968 (aged 27)	166 cm / 65 kg	10	2	2	0	11	1	23	3
MF	(Japan)	Shūta Sonoda	February 6, 1969 (aged 27)	170 cm / 65 kg	17	1	2	1	13	0	32	2
MF	(Japan)	Masashi Miyamura	February 18, 1969 (aged 27)	170 cm / 65 kg	9	0	1	0	2	0	12	0
FW	(Argentina)	Hugo Maradona	May 9, 1969 (aged 26)	165 cm / 69 kg	21	8	0	0	10	4	31	12
DF	(Japan)	Yoshinori Furube	December 9, 1970 (aged 25)	181 cm / 69 kg	20	1	2	0	5	0	27	1
MF	(Japan)	Yoshiyuki Shinoda	June 18, 1971 (aged 24)	168 cm / 66 kg	14	0	0	0	3	0	17	0
FW	(Japan)	Motonobu Takō	April 22, 1972 (aged 23)	175 cm / 70 kg	3	0	0	0	2	0	5	0
DF	(Japan)	Daiji Nii	February 28, 1973 (aged 23)	173 cm / 60 kg	0	0		0	0	0		0
MF	(Japan)	Ichizō Nakata	April 19, 1973 (aged 22)	174 cm / 69 kg	24	0	2	0	11	0	37	0
FW	(Paraguay)	Báez	July 31, 1973 (aged 22)	182 cm / 78 kg	9	3	0	0	8	0	17	3
GK	(Japan)	Hideki Tsukamoto	August 9, 1973 (aged 22)	179 cm / 73 kg	18	0	2	0	14	0	34	0
DF	(Japan)	Osamu Umeyama	August 16, 1973 (aged 22)	177 cm / 67 kg	13	0	1	0	2	0	16	0
FW	(Japan)	Yoshiyuki Takemoto	October 3, 1973 (aged 22)	181 cm / 70 kg	1	0	0	0	2	1	3	1
MF	(Japan)	Kiyotaka Ishimaru	October 30, 1973 (aged 22)	174 cm / 68 kg	23	1	2	0	13	2	38	3
FW	(Japan)	Yūsaku Ueno	November 1, 1973 (aged 22)	182 cm / 74 kg	27	7	2	0	11	0	40	7
MF	(Japan)	Atsushi Nagai	December 23, 1974 (aged 21)	176 cm / 70 kg	9	2	0	0	0	0	9	2
FW	(Japan)	Daisuke Fujimoto	April 12, 1977 (aged 18)	176 cm / 64 kg	0	0		0	0	0		0
MF	(Japan)	Shōji Ikitsu	May 20, 1977 (aged 18)	162 cm / 50 kg	0	0		0	0	0		0
MF	(Japan)	Daisuke Nakaharai	May 22, 1977 (aged 18)	172 cm / 63 kg	0	0		0	0	0		0
DF	(Japan)	Masaharu Nishi	May 29, 1977 (aged 18)	181 cm / 72 kg	0	0		0	0	0		0
DF	(Japan)	Kōji Satō	August 24, 1977 (aged 18)	179 cm / 72 kg	0	0		0	0	0		0
MF	(Japan)	Chikara Fujimoto	October 31, 1977 (aged 18)	168 cm / 69 kg	10	0	1	0	1	1	12	1
FW	(Japan)	Yoshiteru Yamashita	November 21, 1977 (aged 18)	177 cm / 67 kg	19	2	2	2	6	2	27	6
MF	(Japan)	Tatsunori Hisanaga	December 23, 1977 (aged 18)	171 cm / 60 kg	10	0	1	0	4	0	15	0
GK	(Japan)	Satoshi Fujimoto †	June 19, 1976 (aged 19)	-cm / -kg	0	0		0	0	0		0
DF	(Japan)	Hideaki Mori †	October 16, 1972 (aged 23)	183 cm / 73 kg	14	1	1	0	4	0	19	1
MF	(Japan)	Takeshi Hibi †	June 2, 1973 (aged 22)	-cm / -kg	0	0		0	0	0		0

- † player(s) joined the team after the opening of this season.

== Transfers ==
In:

No.	Pos.	Nation	Player
—	GK	JPN	Kiyoto Furushima (from Bellmare Hiratsuka)
—	GK	JPN	Hideki Tsukamoto (from Meiji University)
—	DF	JPN	Satoshi Tsunami (from Verdy Kawasaki)
—	DF	JPN	Atsuhiro Iwai (from Yokohama Flügels)
—	DF	JPN	Masaharu Nishi (from Higashi Fukuoka High School)
—	DF	JPN	Kōji Satō (from Ohzu High School)
—	MF	JPN	Ichizō Nakata (from Yokohama Flügels)
—	MF	JPN	Kiyotaka Ishimaru (from Hannan University)
—	MF	JPN	Shōji Ikitsu (from Higashi Fukuoka High School)
—	MF	JPN	Daisuke Nakaharai (from Shimizu Higashi High School)
—	MF	JPN	Chikara Fujimoto (from Tokushima Municipal High School)
—	MF	JPN	Tatsunori Hisanaga (from Kagoshima Jitsugyo High School)
—	FW	PAR	Richart Martín Báez (from Olimpia)
—	FW	JPN	Yūsaku Ueno (from University of Tsukuba)
—	FW	JPN	Daisuke Fujimoto (from Shimizu Commercial High School)
—	FW	JPN	Yoshiteru Yamashita (from Higashi Fukuoka High School)

Out:

No.	Pos.	Nation	Player
—	GK	JPN	Kenichirō Kobayashi (to Ventforet Kofu)
—	DF	JPN	Kōji Maeda (to Yokohama Flügels)
—	DF	JPN	Yoshiyuki Katō (retired)
—	MF	ARG	Jorge Albero (to Tosu Futures)
—	MF	JPN	Hideki Nagai (to Shimizu S-Pulse)
—	MF	JPN	Hiroyuki Yoshida (to Toshiba)
—	MF	JPN	Kenji Tsuno (retired)
—	FW	JPN	Yūsuke Minoguchi (to Ōita F.C.)
—	DF	JPN	Junya Morishige (retired)
—	DF	JPN	Yoshinori Senbiki (retired)
—	FW	ARG	Piccoli (retired)
—	MF	JPN	Masahiko Kuboyama (retired)

== Transfers during the season ==
=== In ===
- (Japan) Satoshi Fujimoto (from Blaze Kumamoto)
- (Japan) Hideaki Mori (from Sanfrecce Hiroshima)
- (Japan) Takeshi Hibi (from Juntendo University)

=== Out ===
- (Japan) Yoshiyuki Takemoto (to Tokyo Gas)

== Awards ==
none

== Other pages ==
- (in Japanese) J.League official site
- (in Japanese) Avispa Fukuoka official site
