= 2001 Avispa Fukuoka season =

Avispa Fukuoka
2001 season
- Manager: Piccoli
- Stadium: Hakatanomori Football Stadium
- J.League 1: 15th
- Emperor's Cup: 3rd Round
- J.League Cup: 2nd Round
- Top goalscorer: Wagner Lopes (7)
| Home colours | Away colours |

2001 Avispa Fukuoka season

== Competitions ==
| Competitions | Position |
|---|---|
| J.League 1 | 15th / 16 clubs |
| Emperor's Cup | 3rd round |
| J.League Cup | 2nd round |

== Domestic results ==
=== J.League 1 ===
| 10 March 2001 1-1 | Avispa Fukuoka | 2-0 | Gamba Osaka | Hakatanomori Football Stadium |
| JST (UTC+09) |

| 17 March 2001 1-2 | Shimizu S-Pulse | 1-0 | Avispa Fukuoka | Nihondaira Sports Stadium |
| JST (UTC+09) |

| 31 March 2001 1-3 | Urawa Red Diamonds | 2-0 | Avispa Fukuoka | Urawa Komaba Stadium |
| JST (UTC+09) |

| 7 April 2001 1-4 | Avispa Fukuoka | 2-3 (GG) (a.e.t.) | JEF United Ichihara | Hakatanomori Football Stadium |
| JST (UTC+09) |

| 14 April 2001 1-5 | Sanfrecce Hiroshima | 2-3 | Avispa Fukuoka | Hiroshima Stadium |
| JST (UTC+09) |

| 29 April 2001 1-6 | Avispa Fukuoka | 1-0 | Tokyo Verdy 1969 | Hakatanomori Football Stadium |
| JST (UTC+09) |

| 3 May 2001 1-7 | Vissel Kobe | 2-1 | Avispa Fukuoka | Kobe Universiade Memorial Stadium |
| JST (UTC+09) |

| 6 May 2001 1-8 | Cerezo Osaka | 3-0 | Avispa Fukuoka | Osaka Nagai Stadium |
| JST (UTC+09) |

| 12 May 2001 1-9 | Avispa Fukuoka | 1-0 (GG) (a.e.t.) | Yokohama F. Marinos | Hakatanomori Football Stadium |
| JST (UTC+09) |

| 19 May 2001 1-10 | FC Tokyo | 1-2 | Avispa Fukuoka | Tokyo Stadium |
| JST (UTC+09) |

| 16 June 2001 1-11 | Avispa Fukuoka | 0-2 | Kashima Antlers | Hakatanomori Football Stadium |
| JST (UTC+09) |

| 23 June 2001 1-12 | Júbilo Iwata | 2-1 (GG) (a.e.t.) | Avispa Fukuoka | Júbilo Iwata Stadium |
| JST (UTC+09) |

| 7 July 2001 1-13 | Avispa Fukuoka | 0-4 | Nagoya Grampus Eight | Hakatanomori Football Stadium |
| JST (UTC+09) |

| 14 July 2001 1-14 | Avispa Fukuoka | 0-2 | Consadole Sapporo | Hakatanomori Football Stadium |
| JST (UTC+09) |

| 21 July 2001 1-15 | Kashiwa Reysol | 1-0 | Avispa Fukuoka | Kashiwanoha Park Stadium |
| JST (UTC+09) |

| 11 August 2001 2-1 | Yokohama F. Marinos | 1-0 (GG) (a.e.t.) | Avispa Fukuoka | International Stadium Yokohama |
| JST (UTC+09) |

| 18 August 2001 2-2 | Avispa Fukuoka | 4-0 | Cerezo Osaka | Hakatanomori Football Stadium |
| JST (UTC+09) |

| 25 August 2001 2-3 | Avispa Fukuoka | 2-5 | Kashiwa Reysol | Hakatanomori Football Stadium |
| JST (UTC+09) |

| 8 September 2001 2-4 | Consadole Sapporo | 3-4 (GG) (a.e.t.) | Avispa Fukuoka | Sapporo Atsubetsu Park Stadium |
| JST (UTC+09) |

| 15 September 2001 2-5 | Avispa Fukuoka | 0-0 (GG) (a.e.t.) | Vissel Kobe | Hakatanomori Football Stadium |
| JST (UTC+09) |

| 22 September 2001 2-6 | Tokyo Verdy 1969 | 0-3 | Avispa Fukuoka | Tokyo Stadium |
| JST (UTC+09) |

| 29 September 2001 2-7 | Avispa Fukuoka | 0-4 | Sanfrecce Hiroshima | Hakatanomori Football Stadium |
| JST (UTC+09) |

| 13 October 2001 2-8 | JEF United Ichihara | 3-0 | Avispa Fukuoka | Ichihara Seaside Stadium |
| JST (UTC+09) |

| 17 October 2001 2-9 | Avispa Fukuoka | 1-1 (GG) (a.e.t.) | Urawa Red Diamonds | Hakatanomori Football Stadium |
| JST (UTC+09) |

| 20 October 2001 2-10 | Avispa Fukuoka | 1-0 | FC Tokyo | Hakatanomori Football Stadium |
| JST (UTC+09) |

| 31 October 2001 2-11 | Kashima Antlers | 4-1 | Avispa Fukuoka | Kashima Soccer Stadium |
| JST (UTC+09) |

| 3 November 2001 2-12 | Avispa Fukuoka | 2-3 (GG) (a.e.t.) | Júbilo Iwata | Hakatanomori Football Stadium |
| JST (UTC+09) |

| 10 November 2001 2-13 | Nagoya Grampus Eight | 1-0 | Avispa Fukuoka | Mizuho Athletic Stadium |
| JST (UTC+09) |

| 17 November 2001 2-14 | Avispa Fukuoka | 2-3 (GG) (a.e.t.) | Shimizu S-Pulse | Hakatanomori Football Stadium |
| JST (UTC+09) |

| 24 November 2001 2-15 | Gamba Osaka | 3-2 | Avispa Fukuoka | Osaka Expo '70 Stadium |
| JST (UTC+09) |

=== Emperor's Cup ===
| 1st Round | bye |

| 2nd Round | bye |

| 9 December 2001 3rd Round | Avispa Fukuoka | 2-3 (GG) (a.e.t.) | Albirex Niigata | Hakatanomori Football Stadium |
| JST (UTC+09) |

=== J.League Cup ===
| 4 April 2001 1st Round-1 | Vegalta Sendai | 1-2 | Avispa Fukuoka | Sendai Stadium |
| JST (UTC+09) |

| 18 April 2001 1st Round-2 | Avispa Fukuoka | 2-2 (4-3 agg.) | Vegalta Sendai | Hakatanomori Football Stadium |
| JST (UTC+09) |

| 13 June 2001 2nd Round-1 | Avispa Fukuoka | 0-3 | Yokohama F. Marinos | Hakatanomori Football Stadium |
| JST (UTC+09) |

| 20 June 2001 2nd Round-2 | Yokohama F. Marinos | 2-0 (5-0 agg.) | Avispa Fukuoka | Yokohama Mitsuzawa Stadium |
| JST (UTC+09) |

== Player statistics ==
| No. | Pos. | Nat. | Player | D.o.B. (Age) | Height / Weight | J.League 1 | | Emperor's Cup | | J.League Cup | | Total | |
| No. | Pos. | Nat. | Player | D.o.B. (Age) | Height / Weight | Apps | Goals | Apps | Goals | Apps | Goals | Apps | Goals |
|---|---|---|---|---|---|---|---|---|---|---|---|---|---|
| 1 | GK | (Japan) | Nobuyuki Kojima | January 17, 1966 (aged 35) | cm / kg | 8 | 0 | | | | | | |
| 2 | DF | (Japan) | Shinichi Kawaguchi | June 13, 1977 (aged 23) | cm / kg | 9 | 0 | | | | | | |
| 3 | DF | (Japan) | Yoshitaka Fujisaki | May 16, 1975 (aged 25) | cm / kg | 13 | 0 | | | | | | |
| 4 | DF | (Japan) | Mitsuaki Kojima | July 14, 1968 (aged 32) | cm / kg | 29 | 0 | | | | | | |
| 5 | DF | (Japan) | Yasutoshi Miura | July 15, 1965 (aged 35) | cm / kg | 26 | 0 | | | | | | |
| 6 | MF | (Japan) | Yoshiyuki Shinoda | June 18, 1971 (aged 29) | cm / kg | 20 | 0 | | | | | | |
| 7 | MF | (Japan) | Satoru Noda | March 19, 1969 (aged 31) | cm / kg | 28 | 0 | | | | | | |
| 8 | MF | (Romania) | Pavel Badea | June 10, 1967 (aged 33) | cm / kg | 28 | 4 | | | | | | |
| 9 | FW | (Argentina) | Martín Vilallonga | October 8, 1970 (aged 30) | cm / kg | 7 | 0 | | | | | | |
| 9 | FW | (Argentina) | Claudio Biaggio | July 2, 1967 (aged 33) | cm / kg | 12 | 2 | | | | | | |
| 10 | MF | (Japan) | Daisuke Nakaharai | May 22, 1977 (aged 23) | cm / kg | 27 | 1 | | | | | | |
| 11 | MF | (Argentina) | David Bisconti | September 22, 1968 (aged 32) | cm / kg | 5 | 3 | | | | | | |
| 12 | GK | (Japan) | Hideki Tsukamoto | August 9, 1973 (aged 27) | cm / kg | 14 | 0 | | | | | | |
| 13 | DF | (Japan) | Koji Maeda | February 3, 1969 (aged 32) | cm / kg | 21 | 1 | | | | | | |
| 14 | FW | (Japan) | Yoshiteru Yamashita | November 21, 1977 (aged 23) | cm / kg | 21 | 6 | | | | | | |
| 15 | DF | (Japan) | Takuji Miyoshi | August 20, 1978 (aged 22) | cm / kg | 8 | 0 | | | | | | |
| 16 | DF | (Japan) | Takashi Hirajima | February 3, 1982 (aged 19) | cm / kg | 20 | 1 | | | | | | |
| 18 | FW | (Japan) | Tomoji Eguchi | April 22, 1977 (aged 23) | cm / kg | 13 | 3 | | | | | | |
| 19 | GK | (Japan) | Yushi Ozaki | March 24, 1969 (aged 31) | cm / kg | 10 | 0 | | | | | | |
| 20 | MF | (Japan) | Daisuke Nitta | May 11, 1980 (aged 20) | cm / kg | 0 | 0 | | | | | | |
| 21 | DF | (Japan) | Takahiro Inoue | August 16, 1980 (aged 20) | cm / kg | 0 | 0 | | | | | | |
| 22 | MF | (Japan) | Tomoaki Komorida | July 10, 1981 (aged 19) | cm / kg | 2 | 0 | | | | | | |
| 23 | MF | (Japan) | Takeshi Ushibana | September 21, 1977 (aged 23) | cm / kg | 5 | 0 | | | | | | |
| 24 | MF | (Japan) | Tatsunori Hisanaga | December 23, 1977 (aged 23) | cm / kg | 21 | 3 | | | | | | |
| 25 | DF | (Japan) | Toshikazu Kato | May 28, 1981 (aged 19) | cm / kg | 0 | 0 | | | | | | |
| 26 | MF | (Japan) | Yoshifumi Yamada | November 4, 1981 (aged 19) | cm / kg | 0 | 0 | | | | | | |
| 27 | MF | (Japan) | Masashi Uramoto | October 11, 1981 (aged 19) | cm / kg | 0 | 0 | | | | | | |
| 28 | DF | (Japan) | Toru Miyamoto | December 3, 1982 (aged 18) | cm / kg | 1 | 0 | | | | | | |
| 29 | MF | (Japan) | Kenichiro Meta | July 2, 1982 (aged 18) | cm / kg | 0 | 0 | | | | | | |
| 30 | GK | (Japan) | Yuichi Mizutani | May 26, 1980 (aged 20) | cm / kg | 0 | 0 | | | | | | |
| 31 | MF | (Japan) | Koichiro Nagatomo | December 7, 1982 (aged 18) | cm / kg | 0 | 0 | | | | | | |
| 32 | MF | (Japan) | Kazuhiro Ninomiya | November 23, 1982 (aged 18) | cm / kg | 0 | 0 | | | | | | |
| 33 | MF | (Japan) | Kazuyuki Otsuka | July 7, 1982 (aged 18) | cm / kg | 0 | 0 | | | | | | |
| 34 | FW | (Japan) | Hiroki Hattori | August 30, 1971 (aged 29) | cm / kg | 25 | 2 | | | | | | |
| 35 | FW | (Japan) | Hiroshi Fukushima | July 14, 1982 (aged 18) | cm / kg | 0 | 0 | | | | | | |
| 36 | MF | (Argentina) | Alejo Menchon | October 10, 1982 (aged 18) | cm / kg | 0 | 0 | | | | | | |
| 37 | FW | (Japan) | Yoshika Matsubara | August 19, 1974 (aged 26) | cm / kg | 8 | 0 | | | | | | |
| 38 | DF | (Japan) | Naruyuki Naito | November 9, 1967 (aged 33) | cm / kg | 10 | 0 | | | | | | |
| 39 | FW | (Japan) | Wagner Lopes | January 29, 1969 (aged 32) | cm / kg | 8 | 7 | | | | | | |
| 40 | MF | (South Korea) | Noh Jung-Yoon | March 28, 1971 (aged 29) | cm / kg | 13 | 2 | | | | | | |
