= Isoda =

Isoda (written: 磯田) is a Japanese surname. Notable people with the surname include:

- Hideki Isoda (磯田 秀樹, born 1970), Japanese composer, music technologist, and educator
- Junko Isoda (磯田 順子, born 1981), Japanese swimmer
- Kiho Isoda (磯田 妃芳, born 1944), Japanese artist
- Yoko Isoda (磯田 陽子, born 1978), Japanese synchronized swimmer
- Yoshikazu Isoda (礒田 由和, born 1965), Japanese footballer

== See also ==
- 6463 Isoda, a main-belt asteroid
