= Yuji Keigoshi =

Japanese footballer

Yuji Keigoshi 慶越 雄二
Personal information
- Full name: Yuji Keigoshi
- Date of birth: September 17, 1963 (age 63)
- Place of birth: Kagoshima, Japan
- Height: 1.83 m (6 ft 0 in)
- Position: Goalkeeper

Youth career
- 1979–1981: Kagoshima Jitsugyo High School

Senior career*
Years	Team	Apps	(Gls)
1982–1992	Gamba Osaka		
1993–1994	Verdy Kawasaki	1	(0)
1995–1996	Avispa Fukuoka	6	(0)
1997	Kyoto Purple Sanga	0	(0)
Medal record
Gamba Osaka
Winner	Emperor's Cup	1990
Verdy Kawasaki
Winner	J1 League	1993
Winner	J1 League	1994
Winner	J.League Cup	1993
Winner	J.League Cup	1994
- * Club domestic league appearances and goals

Yuji Keigoshi (慶越 雄二, Keigoshi Yuji; born September 17, 1963) is a former Japanese football player.

== Playing career ==
Keigoshi was born in Kagoshima Prefecture on September 17, 1963. After graduating from high school, he joined Matsushita Electric (later Gamba Osaka) in 1982. He played many matches as goalkeeper. Although the club played in Prefectural Leagues in 1982, was promoted to Regional Leagues in 1983 and Japan Soccer League in 1984. In 1990, the club won the Emperor's Cup first major title in his club history. In 1992, Japan Soccer League was folded and founded new league J1 League. In 1993, he moved to Verdy Kawasaki. However he could hardly play in the match behind Shinkichi Kikuchi. In 1995, he moved to Japan Football League club Fukuoka Blux (later Avispa Fukuoka). However he could hardly play in the match behind Tomoaki Sano and Hideki Tsukamoto. In 1997, he moved to Kyoto Purple Sanga. However he could not play at all in the match and retired end of 1997 season.

== Club statistics ==
Club performance			League		Cup		League Cup		Total	
Season	Club	League	Apps	Goals	Apps	Goals	Apps	Goals	Apps	Goals
Japan			League		Emperor's Cup		J.League Cup		Total	
1982	Matsushita Electric	Prefectural Leagues								
1983	Matsushita Electric	Regional Leagues								
1984	Matsushita Electric	JSL Division 2								
1985/86	Matsushita Electric	JSL Division 2								
1986/87	Matsushita Electric	JSL Division 1	1	0					1	0
1987/88	Matsushita Electric	JSL Division 2	3	0			1	0	4	0
1988/89	Matsushita Electric	JSL Division 1	6	0			1	0	7	0
1989/90	Matsushita Electric	JSL Division 1	13	0			0	0	13	0
1990/91	Matsushita Electric	JSL Division 1	14	0			0	0	14	0
1991/92	Matsushita Electric	JSL Division 1	12	0			3	0	15	0
1992	Gamba Osaka	J1 League	-				7	0	7	0
1993	Verdy Kawasaki	J1 League	1	0	0	0	0	0	1	0
1994	Verdy Kawasaki	J1 League	0	0	0	0	0	0	0	0
1995	Fukuoka Blux	Football League	0	0	3	0	-		3	0
1996	Avispa Fukuoka	J1 League	6	0	0	0	0	0	6	0
1997	Kyoto Purple Sanga	J1 League	0	0	0	0	0	0	0	0
Total			56	0	3	0	12	0	71	0
