= Hideaki Mori =

Japanese footballer

Hideaki Mori 森 秀昭
Personal information
- Full name: Hideaki Mori
- Date of birth: 16 October 1972 (age 54)
- Place of birth: Isahaya, Nagasaki, Japan
- Height: 1.83 m (6 ft 0 in)
- Position: Defender

Youth career
- 1988–1990: Chinzei Gakuin High School

Senior career*
Years	Team	Apps	(Gls)
1991–1996	Sanfrecce Hiroshima	36	(0)
1996–1999	Avispa Fukuoka	82	(6)
2000–2003	Consadole Sapporo	61	(2)
Total		179	(8)
Medal record
Sanfrecce Hiroshima
Runner-up	J1 League	1994
Runner-up	Emperor's Cup	1995
Runner-up	Emperor's Cup	1996
- * Club domestic league appearances and goals

Hideaki Mori (森 秀昭, Mori Hideaki; born 16 October 1972) is a former Japanese football player.

== Playing career ==
Mori was born in Isahaya on 16 October 1972. After graduating from high school, he joined Mazda (later Sanfrecce Hiroshima) in 1991. However he could not play at all in the match until 1994. In 1995, he debuted and became a regular player as center back. However he lost his regular position for injury in 1996 and he moved to Avispa Fukuoka in July. He became a regular player as right and left defender of three backs defense. In 2000, he moved to J2 League club Consadole Sapporo. He played as right defender of three backs defender with Yoshihiro Natsuka and Kensaku Omori. In 2000, the club won the champions and was promoted to J1 League. Although he played many matches in 2001, he could hardly play in the match for injury from 2002. He retired at the end of the 2003 season.

== Club statistics ==
Club performance			League		Cup		League Cup		Total	
Season	Club	League	Apps	Goals	Apps	Goals	Apps	Goals	Apps	Goals
Japan			League		Emperor's Cup		J.League Cup		Total	
1991/92	Mazda	JSL Division 1	0	0	0	0	0	0	0	0
1992	Sanfrecce Hiroshima	J1 League	-		0	0	0	0	0	0
1993	Sanfrecce Hiroshima	J1 League	0	0	0	0	0	0	0	0
1994	Sanfrecce Hiroshima	J1 League	0	0	0	0	0	0	0	0
1995	Sanfrecce Hiroshima	J1 League	36	4	0	0	-		36	4
1996	Sanfrecce Hiroshima	J1 League	0	0	0	0	0	0	0	0
1996	Avispa Fukuoka	J1 League	14	1	1	0	4	0	19	1
1997	Avispa Fukuoka	J1 League	27	1	3	0	6	0	36	1
1998	Avispa Fukuoka	J1 League	18	0	3	0	2	0	23	0
1999	Avispa Fukuoka	J1 League	23	4	2	0	3	0	28	4
2000	Consadole Sapporo	J2 League	33	2	4	1	1	0	38	3
2001	Consadole Sapporo	J1 League	23	0	0	0	1	0	24	0
2002	Consadole Sapporo	J1 League	1	0	1	0	0	0	2	0
2003	Consadole Sapporo	J2 League	4	0	0	0	-		4	0
Total			179	12	14	1	17	0	210	13
