= Shoji Ikitsu =

Japanese footballer

Shoji Ikitsu 生津 将司
Personal information
- Full name: Shoji Ikitsu
- Date of birth: May 20, 1977 (age 49)
- Place of birth: Fukuoka, Japan
- Height: 1.62 m (5 ft 4 in)
- Position: Midfielder

Youth career
- 1993–1995: Higashi Fukuoka High School

Senior career*
Years	Team	Apps	(Gls)
1996–1999	Avispa Fukuoka	11	(0)
1999	Sagan Tosu	17	(0)
2001	New Wave Kitakyushu		
Total		28	(0)
- * Club domestic league appearances and goals

Shoji Ikitsu (生津 将司, Ikitsu Shoji; born May 20, 1977) is a former Japanese football player.

== Playing career ==
Ikitsu was born in Fukuoka Prefecture on May 20, 1977. After graduating from high school, he joined his local club Avispa Fukuoka in 1996. Although he was an offensive midfielder, he did not play often. In July 1999, he moved to the newly promoted J2 League club, Sagan Tosu. He played often as a regular player. After one year without playing a game, he joined the Regional Leagues club New Wave Kitakyushu in 2001. He retired at the end of the 2001 season.

== Career statistics ==
Appearances and goals by club, season and competition
Club	Season	League			Emperor's Cup		J.League Cup		Total	
Club	Season	Division	Apps	Goals	Apps	Goals	Apps	Goals	Apps	Goals
Avispa Fukuoka	1996	J1 League	0	0			0	0	0	0
Avispa Fukuoka	1997	J1 League	8	0	0	0	0	0	8	0
Avispa Fukuoka	1998	J1 League	3	0			1	0	4	0
Avispa Fukuoka	1999	J1 League	0	0			0	0	0	0
Sagan Tosu	1999	J2 League	17	0			0	0	17	0
Career total			28	0	0	0	1	0	29	0
