= Atsushi Nagai =

Japanese footballer

Atsushi Nagai 永井 篤志
Personal information
- Full name: Atsushi Nagai
- Date of birth: December 23, 1974 (age 51)
- Place of birth: Kagoshima, Japan
- Height: 1.76 m (5 ft 9 1/2 in)
- Position: Midfielder

Youth career
- 1990–1992: Kunimi High School
- 1993–1994: Komazawa University

Senior career*
Years	Team	Apps	(Gls)
1995–1998	Avispa Fukuoka	54	(9)
1998	Sanfrecce Hiroshima	0	(0)
2000–2006	Montedio Yamagata	251	(8)
2007–2010	Vegalta Sendai	127	(2)
2011	FC Ryukyu	9	(0)
Total		441	(19)
- * Club domestic league appearances and goals

Atsushi Nagai (永井 篤志, Nagai Atsushi; born December 23, 1974) is a former Japanese football player. His elder brother Hideki is also a former footballer.

== Playing career ==
Nagai was born in Kagoshima Prefecture on December 23, 1974. After dropped out from Komazawa University, he joined Japan Football League club Fukuoka Blux in 1995. He became a regular player as offensive midfielder and the club won the champions and was promoted to J1 League from 1996. However his opportunity to play decreased for injury from 1996. In October 1998, he moved to Sanfrecce Hiroshima. However he could not play at all in the match. After a year and a half blank, he joined J2 League club Montedio Yamagata in June 2000. He became a regular player as defensive midfielder and played many matches for a long time. In 2007, he moved to J2 club Vegalta Sendai. He played as defensive midfielder with Naoki Chiba. The club won the champions in 2009 and was promoted to J1 from 2010. However his opportunity to play decreased in 2010. In 2011, he moved to Japan Football League club FC Ryukyu. He played with his brother Hideki Nagai at the club. He retired end of 2011 season.

== Career statistics ==
Appearances and goals by club, season and competition
Club	Season	League			Emperor's Cup		J.League Cup		Total	
Club	Season	Division	Apps	Goals	Apps	Goals	Apps	Goals	Apps	Goals
Fukuoka Blux	1995	Football League	29	7	3	1	—		32	8
Avispa Fukuoka	1996	J1 League	9	2	0	0	0	0	9	2
Avispa Fukuoka	1997	J1 League	16	0	0	0	3	0	19	0
Avispa Fukuoka	1998	J1 League	0	0	0	0	0	0	0	0
Sanfrecce Hiroshima	1998	J1 League	0	0	0	0	0	0	0	0
Montedio Yamagata	2000	J2 League	15	1	1	0	0	0	16	1
Montedio Yamagata	2001	J2 League	37	0	3	0	1	0	41	0
Montedio Yamagata	2002	J2 League	39	0	1	0	—		40	0
Montedio Yamagata	2003	J2 League	42	1	2	0	—		44	1
Montedio Yamagata	2004	J2 League	38	2	2	0	—		40	2
Montedio Yamagata	2005	J2 League	38	3	0	0	—		38	3
Montedio Yamagata	2006	J2 League	42	1	2	0	—		44	1
Vegalta Sendai	2007	J2 League	40	2	0	0	—		40	2
Vegalta Sendai	2008	J2 League	37	0	2	0	—		39	0
Vegalta Sendai	2009	J2 League	40	0	1	0	—		41	0
Vegalta Sendai	2010	J1 League	10	0	0	0	2	0	12	0
FC Ryukyu	2011	Football League	9	0	1	0	—		10	0
Career total			441	19	18	1	6	0	465	20
