= Yusaku Ueno =

Japanese footballer

Yusaku Ueno 上野 優作
Personal information
- Full name: Yusaku Ueno
- Date of birth: November 1, 1973 (age 53)
- Place of birth: Mooka, Tochigi, Japan
- Height: 1.82 m (5 ft 11 1/2 in)
- Position: Forward

Youth career
- 1989–1991: Mooka High School

College career
Years	Team	Apps	(Gls)
1992–1995	University of Tsukuba		

Senior career*
Years	Team	Apps	(Gls)
1996–1999	Avispa Fukuoka	110	(17)
2000	Sanfrecce Hiroshima	5	(1)
2001–2002	Kyoto Purple Sanga	65	(12)
2003–2005	Albirex Niigata	105	(20)
2006–2007	Sanfrecce Hiroshima	21	(0)
2007–2008	Tochigi SC	47	(10)
Total		353	(60)

Managerial career
- 2023–2024: FC Gifu
Medal record
Kyoto Purple Sanga
Winner	Emperor's Cup	2002
Sanfrecce Hiroshima
Runner-up	Emperor's Cup	2007
- * Club domestic league appearances and goals

Yusaku Ueno (上野 優作, Ueno Yusaku; born November 1, 1973) is a former Japanese football player. He was most recently manager of J3 League club FC Gifu.

== Playing career ==
Ueno was born in Mooka on November 1, 1973. After graduating from University of Tsukuba, he joined newly was promoted to J1 League club, Avispa Fukuoka in 1996. He became a regular player from first season. In 2000, he moved to Sanfrecce Hiroshima. However he could hardly play in the match. In 2001, he moved to J2 League club Kyoto Purple Sanga. He played many matches and the club won the champions in 2001 and was promoted to J1 from 2002. In 2003, he moved to J2 club Albirex Niigata. He became played as regular player and the club won the champions in 2003 and was promoted to J1 from 2004. In 2006, he moved to Sanfrecce Hiroshima again. Although he played many matches in 2006, he could not play at all in the match in 2007. In June 2007, he moved to his local club Tochigi SC in Japan Football League. He played as regular player in 2 seasons and the club was promoted to J2 from 2009. However he retired end of 2008 season.

== Coaching career ==
Ueno was member of the technical team that oversaw Japan's campaign at the 2022 World Cup in Qatar.

On 15 December 2022, Ueno appointment manager of J3 club, FC Gifu for upcoming 2023 season.

== Career statistics ==
Appearances and goals by club, season and competition
Club	Season	League			Emperor's Cup		J.League Cup		Total	
Club	Season	Division	Apps	Goals	Apps	Goals	Apps	Goals	Apps	Goals
Avispa Fukuoka	1996	J1 League	27	7	2	0	11	0	40	7
Avispa Fukuoka	1997	J1 League	31	8	3	1	5	1	39	10
Avispa Fukuoka	1998	J1 League	24	1	2	0	2	1	28	2
Avispa Fukuoka	1999	J1 League	28	1	1	0	4	2	33	3
Sanfrecce Hiroshima	2000	J1 League	5	1	0	0	2	0	7	1
Kyoto Purple Sanga	2001	J2 League	42	10	4	2	2	0	48	12
Kyoto Purple Sanga	2002	J1 League	23	2	0	0	4	0	27	2
Albirex Niigata	2003	J2 League	41	13	3	0	—		44	13
Albirex Niigata	2004	J1 League	30	5	1	1	6	0	37	6
Albirex Niigata	2005	J1 League	34	2	1	1	3	0	38	3
Sanfrecce Hiroshima	2006	J1 League	21	0	2	0	6	0	29	0
Sanfrecce Hiroshima	2007	J1 League	0	0	0	0	0	0	0	0
Tochigi SC	2007	Football League	19	2	0	0	—		19	2
Tochigi SC	2008	Football League	28	8	2	0	—		30	8
Career total			353	60	21	5	45	4	419	69

== Managerial statistics ==
As of 27 June 2024.

Managerial record by club and tenure
Team	From	To	Record				
Team	From	To	G	W	D	L	Win %
FC Gifu	1 February 2023	present	0	0	0	0	—
Total			0	0	0	0	—
