= Takuji Miyoshi =

Japanese footballer

Takuji Miyoshi 三好 拓児
Personal information
- Full name: Takuji Miyoshi
- Date of birth: August 20, 1978 (age 48)
- Place of birth: Kitakyushu, Japan
- Height: 1.79 m (5 ft 10 1/2 in)
- Position: Defender

Youth career
- 1994–1996: Kunimi High School

Senior career*
Years	Team	Apps	(Gls)
1997–2001	Avispa Fukuoka	18	(0)
2002–2004	Sagan Tosu	54	(2)
2004–2006	ALO's Hokuriku	57	(4)
2007	Valiente Toyama	10	(1)
2007–2008	FC Ryukyu	26	(2)
Total		165	(9)
- * Club domestic league appearances and goals

Takuji Miyoshi (三好 拓児, Miyoshi Takuji; born August 20, 1978) is a former Japanese football player.

== Playing career ==
Miyoshi was born in Kitakyushu on August 20, 1978. After graduating from high school, he joined J1 League club Avispa Fukuoka based in his local in 1997. He played several matches as substitute center back from 1999. However he could not play many matches. In 2002, he moved to J2 League club Sagan Tosu. He became a regular player as center back in 2002. However his opportunity to play decreased from 2003. In September 2004, he moved to Japan Football League (JFL) club ALO's Hokuriku. He played as regular player in 3 seasons. In 2007, he moved to Regional Leagues club Valiente Toyama. In July 2007, he moved to JFL club FC Ryukyu. He retired at the end of the 2008 season.

== Career statistics ==
Appearances and goals by club, season and competition
Club	Season	League			Emperor's Cup		J.League Cup		Total	
Club	Season	Division	Apps	Goals	Apps	Goals	Apps	Goals	Apps	Goals
Avispa Fukuoka	1997	J1 League	0	0	0	0	0	0	0	0
Avispa Fukuoka	1998	J1 League	0	0	0	0	0	0	0	0
Avispa Fukuoka	1999	J1 League	4	0	0	0	3	0	7	0
Avispa Fukuoka	2000	J1 League	6	0	2	0	2	0	10	0
Avispa Fukuoka	2001	J1 League	8	0	0	0	3	1	11	1
Sagan Tosu	2002	J2 League	34	0	2	0	—		36	0
Sagan Tosu	2003	J2 League	14	2	1	0	—		15	2
Sagan Tosu	2004	J2 League	6	0	0	0	—		6	0
ALO's Hokuriku	2004	Football League	6	2	1	0	—		7	2
ALO's Hokuriku	2005	Football League	27	0	4	0	—		31	0
ALO's Hokuriku	2006	Football League	24	2	—		—		24	2
Valiente Toyama	2007	Regional Leagues	10	1	—		—		10	1
FC Ryukyu	2007	Football League	11	1	—		—		11	1
FC Ryukyu	2008	Football League	15	1	—		—		15	1
Career total			165	9	10	0	8	1	183	10
