= Juan Carlos Villamayor =

Paraguayan footballer (born 1969)

Personal information
- Full name: Juan Carlos Villamayor Medina
- Date of birth: 5 March 1969 (age 57)
- Place of birth: Paraguay
- Height: 1.80 m (5 ft 11 in)
- Position: Right-back

Senior career*
Years	Team	Apps	(Gls)
1988	Atlético Tembetary		
1989	Colchagua		(9)
1990–1991	Guaraní		
1992	Libertad		
1993–1996	Cerro Porteño		
1996	Corinthians		
1998	Celaya		
1998–1999	Avispa Fukuoka		
1999	Ponte Preta		
1999–2000	Rayo Vallecano		
2000	Cerro Porteño	10	(0)
2000–2001	Chacarita Juniors	8	(0)
2002–2006	Sport Colombia		
- River Plate Asunción

International career
1993–1997	Paraguay	18	(3)
- * Club domestic league appearances and goals

Juan Carlos Villamayor Medina (born 5 March 1969) is a former Paraguayan football player.

== Career ==
Besides Paraguay, Villamayor played in Chile, Brazil, Mexico, Japan, Spain and Argentina.

In Chile, Villamayor played for Colchagua in the 1989 Segunda División.

As a player of Mexican club Celaya, Villamayor coincided with the Spanish international Emilio Butragueño in 1998.

== Club statistics ==
Club performance			League		Cup		League Cup		Total	
Season	Club	League	Apps	Goals	Apps	Goals	Apps	Goals	Apps	Goals
Japan			League		Emperor's Cup		J.League Cup		Total	
1998	Avispa Fukuoka	J1 League	1	0	0	0	0	0	1	0
1999	Avispa Fukuoka	J1 League	14	4	0	0	1	1	15	5
Total			15	4	0	0	1	1	16	5

== National team statistics ==
Paraguay national team
Year	Apps	Goals
1993	2	0
1994	0	0
1995	8	2
1996	2	1
1997	6	0
Total	18	3
