= Yoshinori Furube =

Japanese footballer

Yoshinori Furube 古邊 芳昇
Personal information
- Full name: Yoshinori Furube
- Date of birth: December 9, 1970 (age 55)
- Place of birth: Fukuyama, Hiroshima, Japan
- Height: 1.81 m (5 ft 11 1/2 in)
- Position: Defender

Youth career
- 1986–1988: Sakuyo High School
- 1989–1992: Osaka University of Health and Sport Sciences

Senior career*
| Years | Team | Apps | (Gls) |
| 1993 | Kagawa Shiun | | |
| 1994–1998 | Avispa Fukuoka | 116 | (3) |
| 1999–2000 | FC Tokyo | 16 | (2) |
| 2001 | Sagawa Express Tokyo | 15 | (0) |
| Total | | 147 | (5) |
- * Club domestic league appearances and goals

Yoshinori Furube (古邊 芳昇, Furube Yoshinori; born December 9, 1970) is a former Japanese football player.

== Playing career ==
Furube was born in Fukuyama on December 9, 1970. After graduating from Osaka University of Health and Sport Sciences, he joined the Regional Leagues club Kagawa Shiun in 1993. In 1994, he moved to the Japan Football League club Fujieda Blux (later Avispa Fukuoka). He played many matches as center back and the club won the championship in 1995. From 1996, the club was promoted to the J1 League and he played as regular player. In 1999, he moved to the newly-promoted J2 League club, FC Tokyo. The club was promoted to the J1 League in 2000. However, he rarely played in any matches that year. In 2001, he moved to the Japan Football League club Sagawa Express Tokyo. He retired at the end of the 2001 season.

== Club statistics ==
| Club performance | | | League | | Cup | | League Cup | | Total | |
| Season | Club | League | Apps | Goals | Apps | Goals | Apps | Goals | Apps | Goals |
| Japan | | | League | | Emperor's Cup | | J.League Cup | | Total | |
|---|---|---|---|---|---|---|---|---|---|---|
| 1993 | Kagawa Shiun | Regional Leagues | | | | | | | | |
| 1994 | Fujieda Blux | Football League | 22 | 1 | 1 | 1 | - | | 23 | 2 |
| 1995 | Fukuoka Blux | Football League | 14 | 1 | 1 | 0 | - | | 15 | 1 |
| 1996 | Avispa Fukuoka | J1 League | 20 | 1 | 2 | 0 | 5 | 0 | 27 | 1 |
| 1997 | Avispa Fukuoka | J1 League | 32 | 0 | 3 | 0 | 6 | 0 | 41 | 0 |
| 1998 | Avispa Fukuoka | J1 League | 28 | 0 | 3 | 0 | 4 | 0 | 35 | 0 |
| 1999 | FC Tokyo | J2 League | 14 | 2 | 1 | 0 | 3 | 0 | 18 | 2 |
| 2000 | FC Tokyo | J1 League | 2 | 0 | 0 | 0 | 0 | 0 | 0 | 0 |
| 2001 | Sagawa Express Tokyo | Football League | 15 | 0 | 0 | 0 | - | | 15 | 0 |
| Total | | | 147 | 5 | 11 | 1 | 18 | 0 | 176 | 6 |
