= Masaharu Nishi =

Japanese footballer

Masaharu Nishi 西 政治
Personal information
- Full name: Masaharu Nishi
- Date of birth: May 29, 1977 (age 49)
- Place of birth: Fukuoka, Japan
- Height: 1.81 m (5 ft 11 1/2 in)
- Position: Defender

Youth career
- 1993–1995: Higashi Fukuoka High School
- 1999–2002: Chukyo University

Senior career*
Years	Team	Apps	(Gls)
1996–1998	Avispa Fukuoka	15	(0)
2003	Ventforet Kofu	1	(0)
Total		16	(0)

International career
1997	Japan U-20	1	(0)
- * Club domestic league appearances and goals

Masaharu Nishi (西 政治, Nishi Masaharu; born May 29, 1977) is a former Japanese football player.

== Club career ==
Nishi was born in Fukuoka Prefecture on May 29, 1977. After graduating from high school, he joined his local club Avispa Fukuoka in 1996. Although he got an opportunity to play as center back in 1997, he lost his opportunity to play in 1998. He left the club end of 1998 season and enrolled in Chukyo University in 1999. After graduating from university, he joined Ventforet Kofu in 2003. However he could hardly play in the match and retired at the end of the 2003 season.

== National team career ==
In June 1997, Nishi was selected Japan U-20 national team for 1997 World Youth Championship. At this tournament, he played 1 match against Spain in first game.

== Career statistics ==
Appearances and goals by club, season and competition
Club	Season	League			Emperor's Cup		J.League Cup		Total	
Club	Season	Division	Apps	Goals	Apps	Goals	Apps	Goals	Apps	Goals
Avispa Fukuoka	1996	J1 League	0	0	0	0	0	0	0	0
Avispa Fukuoka	1997	J1 League	15	0	0	0	1	0	16	0
Avispa Fukuoka	1998	J1 League	0	0	0	0	0	0	0	0
Ventforet Kofu	2003	J2 League	1	0			—		1	0
Career total			16	0	0	0	1	0	1	0
