= Kentaro Sakai =

Japanese footballer

Kentaro Sakai 栄井 健太郎
Personal information
- Full name: Kentaro Sakai
- Date of birth: May 19, 1975 (age 51)
- Place of birth: Fukuoka, Japan
- Height: 1.76 m (5 ft 9 1/2 in)
- Position: Midfielder

Youth career
- 1991–1993: Higashi Fukuoka High School
- 1994–1997: Kansai University

Senior career*
| Years | Team | Apps | (Gls) |
| 1998–1999 | Avispa Fukuoka | 25 | (0) |
| Total | | 25 | (0) |
- * Club domestic league appearances and goals

Kentaro Sakai (栄井 健太郎, Sakai Kentaro; born May 19, 1975) is a former Japanese football player.

== Playing career ==
Sakai was born in Fukuoka Prefecture on May 19, 1975. After graduating from Kansai University, he joined his local club Avispa Fukuoka in 1998. He played many matches as defensive midfielder in first season. However his opportunity to play decreased in 1999 and retired end of 1999 season.

== Career statistics ==
Appearances and goals by club, season and competition
| Club | Season | League | | | Emperor's Cup | | J.League Cup | | Total | |
| Club | Season | Division | Apps | Goals | Apps | Goals | Apps | Goals | Apps | Goals |
|---|---|---|---|---|---|---|---|---|---|---|
| Avispa Fukuoka | 1998 | J1 League | 21 | 0 | 3 | 0 | 2 | 0 | 26 | 0 |
| Avispa Fukuoka | 1999 | J1 League | 4 | 0 | 1 | 0 | 2 | 0 | 7 | 0 |
| Career total | | | 25 | 0 | 4 | 0 | 4 | 0 | 33 | 0 |
