= Fernando (footballer, born 1967) =

Brazilian footballer

Personal information
- Full name: Fernando Henrique Mariano
- Date of birth: 3 April 1967 (age 59)
- Place of birth: Uberlândia, Brazil
- Height: 1.70 m (5 ft 7 in)
- Position: Midfielder

Senior career*
Years	Team	Apps	(Gls)
1986–1989	Uberlândia		
1989–1993	Mogi Mirim		
1993	Portuguesa Desportos		
1994–1995	Guarani		
1996–1998	Internacional		
1998–1999	Avispa Fukuoka		
2000–2001	Palmeiras		
2002	Juventude		
2003–2004	Botafogo		
2005	Santo André		
2006–2007	Marília		
2007–2009	Santo André		
- * Club domestic league appearances and goals

Fernando Henrique Mariano (born 3 April 1967) is a Brazilian football player.

== Club statistics ==
Club performance			League		Cup		League Cup		Total	
Season	Club	League	Apps	Goals	Apps	Goals	Apps	Goals	Apps	Goals
Brazil			League		Copa do Brasil		League Cup		Total	
1993	Portuguesa Desportos	Série A	15	1					15	1
1994	Guarani	Série A	26	0					26	0
1995	Guarani	Série A	13	0					13	0
1996	Internacional	Série A	20	0					20	0
1997	Internacional	Série A	27	0					27	0
1998	Internacional	Série A	9	4					9	4
Japan			League		Emperor's Cup		J.League Cup		Total	
1998	Avispa Fukuoka	J1 League	26	6	2	1	4	1	32	8
1999	Avispa Fukuoka	J1 League	25	8	0	0	4	0	29	8
Brazil			League		Copa do Brasil		League Cup		Total	
2000	Palmeiras	Série A	22	0					22	0
2001	Palmeiras	Série A	25	0					25	0
2002	Juventude	Série A	17	0					17	0
2003	Botafogo	Série B	32	1					32	1
2004	Botafogo	Série A	43	0					43	0
2005	Santo André	Série B	19	1					19	1
Country	Brazil		268	7					268	7
Country	Japan		51	14	2	1	8	1	61	16
Total			319	21	2	1	8	1	329	23
