= 1999 Avispa Fukuoka season =

Avispa Fukuoka
1999 season
- Manager: Yoshio Kikugawa
- Stadium: Hakatanomori Football Stadium
- J.League 1: 14th
- Emperor's Cup: 4th Round
- J.League Cup: 2nd Round
- Top goalscorer: Fernando (8)
Home colours	Away colours

1999 Avispa Fukuoka season

== Competitions ==
Competitions	Position
J.League 1	14th / 16 clubs
Emperor's Cup	4th Round
J.League Cup	2nd Round

== Domestic results ==
=== J.League 1 ===
6 March 1999 1-1	Nagoya Grampus Eight	1-0	Avispa Fukuoka	Mizuho Athletic Stadium
JST (UTC+09)

13 March 1999 1-2	Avispa Fukuoka	1-4	Kashiwa Reysol	Hakatanomori Football Stadium
JST (UTC+09)

20 March 1999 1-3	Gamba Osaka	3-2	Avispa Fukuoka	Osaka Expo '70 Stadium
JST (UTC+09)

27 March 1999 1-4	Avispa Fukuoka	2-1	Yokohama F. Marinos	Hakatanomori Football Stadium
JST (UTC+09)

3 April 1999 1-5	JEF United Ichihara	1-3	Avispa Fukuoka	Ichihara Seaside Stadium
JST (UTC+09)

10 April 1999 1-6	Avispa Fukuoka	1-3	Shimizu S-Pulse	Hakatanomori Football Stadium
JST (UTC+09)

17 April 1999 1-7	Vissel Kobe	1-2 (GG) (a.e.t.)	Avispa Fukuoka	Kobe Universiade Memorial Stadium
JST (UTC+09)

24 April 1999 1-8	Avispa Fukuoka	2-5	Cerezo Osaka	Hakatanomori Football Stadium
JST (UTC+09)

28 April 1999 1-9	Avispa Fukuoka	2-3	Sanfrecce Hiroshima	Hakatanomori Football Stadium
JST (UTC+09)

26 May 1999 1-10	Júbilo Iwata	1-0 (GG) (a.e.t.)	Avispa Fukuoka	Júbilo Iwata Stadium
JST (UTC+09)

5 May 1999 1-11	Avispa Fukuoka	1-2	Verdy Kawasaki	Hakatanomori Football Stadium
JST (UTC+09)

8 May 1999 1-12	Kashima Antlers	3-0	Avispa Fukuoka	Toyama Athletic Stadium
JST (UTC+09)

15 May 1999 1-13	Avispa Fukuoka	2-0	Bellmare Hiratsuka	Hakatanomori Football Stadium
JST (UTC+09)

22 May 1999 1-14	Urawa Red Diamonds	2-3 (GG) (a.e.t.)	Avispa Fukuoka	Urawa Komaba Stadium
JST (UTC+09)

29 May 1999 1-15	Avispa Fukuoka	2-0	Kyoto Purple Sanga	Hakatanomori Football Stadium
JST (UTC+09)

7 August 1999 2-1	Avispa Fukuoka	1-1 (GG) (a.e.t.)	Vissel Kobe	Hakatanomori Football Stadium
JST (UTC+09)

14 August 1999 2-2	Cerezo Osaka	0-2	Avispa Fukuoka	Osaka Nagai Stadium
JST (UTC+09)

2 October 1999 2-3	Sanfrecce Hiroshima	2-0	Avispa Fukuoka	Hiroshima Stadium
JST (UTC+09)

21 August 1999 2-4	Avispa Fukuoka	0-2	Júbilo Iwata	Hakatanomori Football Stadium
JST (UTC+09)

28 August 1999 2-5	Verdy Kawasaki	2-0	Avispa Fukuoka	Todoroki Athletics Stadium
JST (UTC+09)

4 September 1999 2-6	Avispa Fukuoka	2-3	Kashima Antlers	Hakatanomori Football Stadium
JST (UTC+09)

11 September 1999 2-7	Bellmare Hiratsuka	0-3	Avispa Fukuoka	Hiratsuka Athletics Stadium
JST (UTC+09)

15 September 1999 2-8	Avispa Fukuoka	2-1 (GG) (a.e.t.)	Urawa Red Diamonds	Hakatanomori Football Stadium
JST (UTC+09)

18 September 1999 2-9	Kyoto Purple Sanga	1-5	Avispa Fukuoka	Nishikyogoku Athletic Stadium
JST (UTC+09)

23 September 1999 2-10	Avispa Fukuoka	1-3	Nagoya Grampus Eight	Hakatanomori Football Stadium
JST (UTC+09)

30 October 1999 2-11	Avispa Fukuoka	1-3	Gamba Osaka	Hakatanomori Football Stadium
JST (UTC+09)

17 November 1999 2-12	Kashiwa Reysol	3-1	Avispa Fukuoka	Hitachi Kashiwa Soccer Stadium
JST (UTC+09)

20 November 1999 2-13	Shimizu S-Pulse	1-0	Avispa Fukuoka	Nihondaira Sports Stadium
JST (UTC+09)

23 November 1999 2-14	Avispa Fukuoka	0-5	JEF United Ichihara	Hakatanomori Football Stadium
JST (UTC+09)

27 November 1999 2-15	Yokohama F. Marinos	2-0	Avispa Fukuoka	International Stadium Yokohama
JST (UTC+09)

=== Emperor's Cup ===
1st Round	bye

2nd Round	bye

12 December 1999 3rd Round	Avispa Fukuoka	1-0	Consadole Sapporo	Hakatanomori Football Stadium
JST (UTC+09)

19 December 1999 4th Round	Avispa Fukuoka	1-2	Sanfrecce Hiroshima	Gifu Nagaragawa Stadium
JST (UTC+09)

=== J.League Cup ===
7 April 1999 1st Round-1	Consadole Sapporo	1-0	Avispa Fukuoka	Muroran Irie Stadium
JST (UTC+09)

14 April 1999 1st Round-2	Avispa Fukuoka	3-0 (3-1 agg.)	Consadole Sapporo	Hakatanomori Football Stadium
JST (UTC+09)

12 June 1999 2nd Round-1	Avispa Fukuoka	1-1	Júbilo Iwata	Hakatanomori Football Stadium
JST (UTC+09)

19 June 1999 2nd Round-2	Júbilo Iwata	1-0 (2-1 agg.)	Avispa Fukuoka	Júbilo Iwata Stadium
JST (UTC+09)

== Player statistics ==
No.	Pos.	Nat.	Player	D.o.B. (Age)	Height / Weight	J.League 1		Emperor's Cup		J.League Cup		Total	
No.	Pos.	Nat.	Player	D.o.B. (Age)	Height / Weight	Apps	Goals	Apps	Goals	Apps	Goals	Apps	Goals
1	GK	(Japan)	Hideki Tsukamoto	August 9, 1973 (aged 25)	cm / kg	0	0						
2	DF	(Japan)	Hideaki Mori	October 16, 1972 (aged 26)	cm / kg	23	4						
3	DF	(Japan)	Masafumi Mizuki	August 1, 1974 (aged 24)	cm / kg	14	2						
4	DF	(Japan)	Mitsuaki Kojima	July 14, 1968 (aged 30)	cm / kg	22	0						
5	MF	(Brazil)	Fernando	April 3, 1967 (aged 31)	cm / kg	25	8						
6	MF	(Japan)	Yoshiyuki Shinoda	June 18, 1971 (aged 27)	cm / kg	27	2						
7	MF	(Japan)	Satoru Noda	March 19, 1969 (aged 29)	cm / kg	27	2						
8	MF	(Japan)	Kiyotaka Ishimaru	October 30, 1973 (aged 25)	cm / kg	16	2						
9	FW	(Japan)	Yusaku Ueno	November 1, 1973 (aged 25)	cm / kg	28	1						
10	MF	(Japan)	Daisuke Nakaharai	May 22, 1977 (aged 21)	cm / kg	27	0						
11	MF	(Serbia and Montenegro)	Nenad Maslovar	February 20, 1967 (aged 32)	cm / kg	22	4						
12	DF	(Japan)	Yoshitaka Fujisaki	May 16, 1975 (aged 23)	cm / kg	24	1						
13	DF	(Japan)	Yoshihiro Nishida	January 30, 1973 (aged 26)	cm / kg	30	1						
14	FW	(Japan)	Yoshiteru Yamashita	November 21, 1977 (aged 21)	cm / kg	25	6						
15	MF	(Japan)	Shoji Ikitsu	May 20, 1977 (aged 21)	cm / kg	0	0						
16	GK	(Japan)	Minoru Kushibiki	June 10, 1967 (aged 31)	cm / kg	0	0						
17	MF	(Japan)	Takanobu Kondo	August 8, 1978 (aged 20)	cm / kg	0	0						
18	DF	(Japan)	Takuji Miyoshi	August 20, 1978 (aged 20)	cm / kg	4	0						
19	MF	(Japan)	Daisuke Nitta	May 11, 1980 (aged 18)	cm / kg	0	0						
20	MF	(Japan)	Kentaro Sakai	May 20, 1975 (aged 23)	cm / kg	4	0						
21	GK	(Japan)	Takashi Takusagawa	February 12, 1981 (aged 18)	cm / kg	2	0						
22	MF	(Japan)	Norita Ochiai	September 2, 1980 (aged 18)	cm / kg	0	0						
23	DF	(Japan)	Takahiro Inoue	August 16, 1980 (aged 18)	cm / kg	0	0						
24	MF	(Japan)	Tatsunori Hisanaga	December 23, 1977 (aged 21)	cm / kg	10	0						
25	FW	(Japan)	Daiki Fukagawa	August 29, 1980 (aged 18)	cm / kg	0	0						
26	MF	(Brazil)	Ranieli	December 19, 1970 (aged 28)	cm / kg	1	0						
27	DF	(Paraguay)	Juan Carlos Villamayor	March 5, 1969 (aged 30)	cm / kg	14	4						
28	DF	(Japan)	Yasutoshi Miura	July 15, 1965 (aged 33)	cm / kg	23	4						
29	DF	(Japan)	Yoichi Masutani	August 1, 1977 (aged 21)	cm / kg	0	0						
30	GK	(Japan)	Nobuyuki Kojima	January 17, 1966 (aged 33)	cm / kg	29	0						

== Other pages ==
- (in Japanese) J.League official site
