= Yoshitaka Fujisaki =

Japanese footballer (born 1975)

Yoshitaka Fujisaki 藤崎 義孝
Personal information
- Full name: Yoshitaka Fujisaki
- Date of birth: May 16, 1975 (age 51)
- Place of birth: Kagoshima, Japan
- Height: 1.78 m (5 ft 10 in)
- Position: Defender

Youth career
- 1991–1993: Kagoshima Jitsugyo High School
- 1994–1997: National Institute of Fitness and Sports in Kanoya

Senior career*
Years	Team	Apps	(Gls)
1998–2002	Avispa Fukuoka	70	(1)
Total		70	(1)
- * Club domestic league appearances and goals

Yoshitaka Fujisaki (藤崎 義孝, Fujisaki Yoshitaka; born May 16, 1975) is a former Japanese football player.

== Playing career ==
Fujisaki was born in Kagoshima Prefecture on May 16, 1975. After graduating from National Institute of Fitness and Sports in Kanoya, he joined the J1 League club Avispa Fukuoka in 1998. He played many matches as center back from 1999. However his opportunity to play decreased from 2001 and the club was relegated to the J2 League in 2002. He retired at the end of the 2002 season.

== Career statistics ==
Appearances and goals by club, season and competition
Club	Season	League			Emperor's Cup		J.League Cup		Total	
Club	Season	Division	Apps	Goals	Apps	Goals	Apps	Goals	Apps	Goals
Avispa Fukuoka	1998	J1 League	0	0	0	0	0	0	0	0
Avispa Fukuoka	1999	J1 League	24	1	2	0	4	0	30	1
Avispa Fukuoka	2000	J1 League	22	0	0	0	2	0	24	0
Avispa Fukuoka	2001	J1 League	13	0	1	0	3	0	17	0
Avispa Fukuoka	2002	J2 League	11	0	0	0	—		11	0
Career total			70	1	3	0	9	0	82	1
