= Kiyotaka Ishimaru =

Japanese footballer and manager

Kiyotaka Ishimaru 石丸 清隆
Personal information
- Full name: Kiyotaka Ishimaru
- Date of birth: 30 October 1973 (age 52)
- Place of birth: Katano, Osaka, Japan
- Height: 1.75 m (5 ft 9 in)
- Position: Midfielder

Team information
- Current team: FC Gifu (manager)

Youth career
- 1992–1995: Hannan University

Senior career*
Years	Team	Apps	(Gls)
1996–2000	Avispa Fukuoka	120	(9)
2001–2005	Kyoto Purple Sanga	124	(5)
2005–2006	Ehime FC	37	(2)
Total		281	(16)

Managerial career
- 2013–2014: Ehime FC
- 2015–2016: Kyoto Sanga FC
- 2020–2021: Montedio Yamagata
- 2022–2025: Ehime FC
- 2025–: FC Gifu
Medal record
Kyoto Purple Sanga
Winner	Emperor's Cup	2002
- * Club domestic league appearances and goals

Kiyotaka Ishimaru (石丸 清隆, Ishimaru Kiyotaka; born October 30, 1973) is a Japanese professional football manager and former player.

== Playing career ==
Ishimaru was born in Katano on October 30, 1973. After graduating from Hannan University, he joined the newly promoted J1 League club, Avispa Fukuoka in 1996. He became a regular player and played often until 2000. In 2001, he moved to the J2 League club Kyoto Purple Sanga. He played as a regular player and the club won the championship and was promoted to J1 in 2002. In 2002, the club won the Emperor's Cup, it was the first major title in club history. In 2003, he became a captain, and the club finished in last place and was relegated to J2 in 2004. In 2005, he did not play in any matches and he moved to the Japan Football League club Ehime FC in October. The club won the championship in 2005 and was promoted to J2 in 2006. He played many matches as a substitute and retired at the end of the 2006 season.

== Coaching career ==
After retirement, Ishimaru started a coaching career at Ehime FC in 2007. He served as a coach for the top team (2007–09) and manager for the youth team (2010–12). In 2013, he became a manager for the top team until 2014. In 2015, he moved to Kyoto Sanga FC and became a coach. In July 2015, manager Masahiro Wada resigned and Ishimaru became the new manager as Wada's successor. In 2016, the club finished in 5th place and missed promotion to J1. He was terminated at the end of the season.

On 14 December 2019, it was announced that Ishimaru would become manager of J2 League club, Montedio Yamagata for the 2020 season. However in April, he was dismissed after only the ninth gameweek due to his team's poor performance, languishing in 20th place with 1 win, 4 losses and 4 draws.

On 17 December 2021, Ishimaru returned to Ehime FC for the 2022 season, beginning his second stint in charge after managing them in 2013. On 11 November 2023, Ishimaru led Ehime FC to become J3 League champions, returning to the second tier for the 2024 season after a two year absence.

== Club statistics ==
Club performance			League		Cup		League Cup		Total	
Season	Club	League	Apps	Goals	Apps	Goals	Apps	Goals	Apps	Goals
Japan			League		Emperor's Cup		J.League Cup		Total	
1996	Avispa Fukuoka	J1 League	23	1	2	0	13	2	38	3
1997	Avispa Fukuoka	J1 League	29	4	3	2	6	0	38	3
1998	Avispa Fukuoka	J1 League	28	2	2	1	4	2	34	5
1999	Avispa Fukuoka	J1 League	16	2	2	0	3	1	21	3
2000	Avispa Fukuoka	J1 League	24	0	1	0	3	0	28	0
2001	Kyoto Purple Sanga	J2 League	37	3	4	0	2	0	43	3
2002	Kyoto Purple Sanga	J1 League	26	0	5	0	5	0	36	0
2003	Kyoto Purple Sanga	J1 League	27	0	0	0	4	0	31	0
2004	Kyoto Purple Sanga	J2 League	34	2	1	0	-		35	2
2005	Kyoto Purple Sanga	J2 League	0	0	0	0	-		0	0
2005	Ehime FC	Football League	6	1	0	0	-		6	1
2006	Ehime FC	J2 League	31	1	1	0	-		32	1
Career total			281	16	21	3	40	5	342	24

== Managerial statistics ==
As of 19 November 2023.

Team	From	To	Record				
Team	From	To	G	W	D	L	Win %
Ehime FC	10 December 2012	31 January 2015	84	24	23	37	28.57
Kyoto Sanga FC	11 July 2015	6 December 2016	62	24	25	13	38.71
Montedio Yamagata	1 February 2020	22 April 2021	51	18	15	18	35.29
Ehime FC	17 December 2021	present	70	34	20	16	48.57
Total			267	101	82	84	37.83

== Honours ==
=== Manager ===
Ehime FC

- J3 League: 2023
