= Yoshiteru Yamashita =

Japanese footballer

Yoshiteru Yamashita 山下 芳輝
Personal information
- Full name: Yoshiteru Yamashita
- Date of birth: November 21, 1977 (age 48)
- Place of birth: Fukuoka, Japan
- Height: 1.77 m (5 ft 9 1/2 in)
- Position: Forward

Youth career
- 1993–1995: Higashi Fukuoka High School

Senior career*
Years	Team	Apps	(Gls)
1996–2001	Avispa Fukuoka	118	(27)
2002–2003	Vegalta Sendai	59	(14)
2004–2006	Kashiwa Reysol	27	(1)
2005	→Omiya Ardija (loan)	5	(0)
2007	Tochigi SC	28	(6)
2008–2010	FC Ryukyu	93	(19)
Total		330	(67)

International career
1997	Japan U-20	2	(0)
2001–2003	Japan	3	(0)
Medal record
Men's football
Representing Japan
FIFA Confederations Cup
Runner-up	2001 Korea/Japan
- * Club domestic league appearances and goals

Yoshiteru Yamashita (山下 芳輝, Yamashita Yoshiteru; born November 21, 1977) is a former Japanese football player. He played for Japan national team.

== Club career ==
Yamashita was born in Fukuoka on November 21, 1977. After graduating from Higashi Fukuoka High School in 1996, he joined J1 League side Avispa Fukuoka. He made his professional debut on March 16, 1996. He scored his first professional goal on April 27, 1996 against Kyoto Purple Sanga. He played many matches from first season. However the club relegated to J2 League in 2001 and he moved to Vegalta Sendai. However the club relegated to J2 in 2003 again and he moved to Kashiwa Reysol in 2004. However his opportunity to play decreased. He also played in Omiya Ardija on loan in 2005. He moved to Japan Football League club Tochigi SC in 2007 and FC Ryukyu in 2008. He retired end of 2010 season.

== National team career ==
In June 1997, Yamashita was selected Japan U-20 national team for 1997 World Youth Championship. He played in 2 matches.

In 2001, Yamashita was selected Japan national team for 2001 Confederations Cup. He made his international debut in the tournament on June 4, 2001 against Brazil at Kashima Soccer Stadium. At this tournament, Japan won the 2nd place. He earned 3 caps between 2001 and 2003 and scored no goals for Japan.

== Career statistics ==
=== Club ===
Appearances and goals by club, season and competition
Club	Season	League			Emperor's Cup		J.League Cup		Total	
Club	Season	Division	Apps	Goals	Apps	Goals	Apps	Goals	Apps	Goals
Avispa Fukuoka	1996	J1 League	19	2	2	2	6	2	27	6
Avispa Fukuoka	1997	J1 League	13	3	3	0	6	0	22	3
Avispa Fukuoka	1998	J1 League	32	7	1	0	3	0	36	7
Avispa Fukuoka	1999	J1 League	25	6	2	1	1	0	28	7
Avispa Fukuoka	2000	J1 League	8	3	0	0	0	0	8	3
Avispa Fukuoka	2001	J1 League	21	6	1	0	3	1	25	7
Vegalta Sendai	2002	J1 League	30	10	1	0	0	0	31	10
Vegalta Sendai	2003	J1 League	29	4	1	1	4	1	34	6
Kashiwa Reysol	2004	J1 League	13	0	0	0	3	0	16	0
Kashiwa Reysol	2005	J1 League	9	1	0	0	2	0	11	1
Omiya Ardija	2005	J1 League	5	0	1	0	2	0	8	0
Kashiwa Reysol	2006	J2 League	5	0	0	0	—		5	0
Tochigi SC	2007	Football League	28	6	2	0	—		30	6
FC Ryukyu	2008	Football League	31	6	—		—		31	6
FC Ryukyu	2009	Football League	30	9	—		—		30	9
FC Ryukyu	2010	Football League	32	4	0	0	—		32	4
Career total			330	67	14	4	30	4	374	75

=== International ===
Japan national team
Year	Apps	Goals
2001	2	0
2002	0	0
2003	1	0
Total	3	0

== Honors ==
- FIFA Confederations Cup Runner-up: 2001
