= Daisuke Nakaharai =

Japanese footballer

Daisuke Nakaharai 中払 大介
Personal information
- Full name: Daisuke Nakaharai
- Date of birth: May 22, 1977 (age 49)
- Place of birth: Shizuoka, Japan
- Height: 1.73 m (5 ft 8 in)
- Position: Midfielder

Youth career
- 1993–1995: Shimizu Higashi High School

Senior career*
Years	Team	Apps	(Gls)
1996–2001	Avispa Fukuoka	118	(10)
2002–2007	Kyoto Sanga FC	183	(20)
2008–2009	Avispa Fukuoka	45	(0)
Total		346	(30)
Medal record
Kyoto Sanga FC
Winner	Emperor's Cup	2002
- * Club domestic league appearances and goals

Daisuke Nakaharai (中払 大介, Nakaharai Daisuke; born May 22, 1977) is a former Japanese football player.

== Playing career ==
Nakaharai was born in Shizuoka Prefecture on May 22, 1977. After graduating from Shimizu Higashi High School, he joined newly was promoted to J1 League club, Avispa Fukuoka in 1996. He became a regular player in 1997 and played many matches for a long time. However the club results were bad every season and was relegated to J2 League from 2002. In 2001, he moved to Kyoto Purple Sanga (later Kyoto Sanga FC). He played as regular player from first season and the club won the champions 2002 Emperor's Cup. However the club results were bad after that, he also played in J2. Although he served as captain in 2005 and 2006, his opportunity to play decreased in 2007. In 2008, he moved to Avispa Fukuoka for the first time in 7 years. He retired end of 2009 season.

== Career statistics ==
Appearances and goals by club, season and competition
Club	Season	League			Emperor's Cup		J.League Cup		Total	
Club	Season	Division	Apps	Goals	Apps	Goals	Apps	Goals	Apps	Goals
Avispa Fukuoka	1996	J1 League	0	0	0	0	0	0	0	0
Avispa Fukuoka	1997	J1 League	27	2	3	0	6	1	36	3
Avispa Fukuoka	1998	J1 League	15	3	0	0	2	0	17	3
Avispa Fukuoka	1999	J1 League	27	0	2	0	3	0	32	0
Avispa Fukuoka	2000	J1 League	22	4	1	0	1	0	24	4
Avispa Fukuoka	2001	J1 League	27	1	1	0	2	0	30	1
Kyoto Purple Sanga	2002	J1 League	27	3	3	0	5	1	35	4
Kyoto Purple Sanga	2003	J1 League	27	3	0	0	4	1	31	4
Kyoto Purple Sanga	2004	J2 League	39	6	2	1	—		41	7
Kyoto Purple Sanga	2005	J2 League	39	5	1	0	—		40	5
Kyoto Purple Sanga	2006	J1 League	27	3	1	0	5	0	33	3
Kyoto Sanga FC	2007	J2 League	24	0	1	0	—		25	0
Avispa Fukuoka	2008	J2 League	22	0	1	0	—		23	0
Avispa Fukuoka	2009	J2 League	23	0	1	1	—		24	1
Career total			346	30	17	2	28	3	391	35
