= 1998 Avispa Fukuoka season =

Avispa Fukuoka
1998 season
- Manager: Takaji Mori
- Stadium: Hakatanomori Football Stadium
- J.League: 18th
- Emperor's Cup: 4th Round
- J.League Cup: GL-B 3rd
- Top goalscorer: Yoshiteru Yamashita (7)
Home colours	Away colours

1998 Avispa Fukuoka season

== Competitions ==
Competitions	Position
J.League	18th / 18 clubs
Emperor's Cup	4th round
J.League Cup	GL-B 3rd / 5 clubs

== Domestic results ==
=== J.League ===
21 March 1998 1-1	Kashima Antlers	4-2	Avispa Fukuoka	Kashima Soccer Stadium
JST (UTC+09)

25 March 1998 1-2	Avispa Fukuoka	0-0 (GG) (a.e.t.) (3-4 p)	Kashiwa Reysol	Hakatanomori Football Stadium
JST (UTC+09)

28 March 1998 1-3	Gamba Osaka	3-2	Avispa Fukuoka	Osaka Expo '70 Stadium
JST (UTC+09)

4 April 1998 1-4	Avispa Fukuoka	2-5	Yokohama Marinos	Hakatanomori Football Stadium
JST (UTC+09)

11 April 1998 1-5	Urawa Red Diamonds	2-2 (GG) (a.e.t.) (5-4 p)	Avispa Fukuoka	Urawa Komaba Stadium
JST (UTC+09)

15 April 1998 1-6	Avispa Fukuoka	1-2	Nagoya Grampus Eight	Hakatanomori Football Stadium
JST (UTC+09)

18 April 1998 1-7	Bellmare Hiratsuka	3-2 (GG) (a.e.t.)	Avispa Fukuoka	Tokyo National Stadium
JST (UTC+09)

25 April 1998 1-8	Avispa Fukuoka	1-7	Júbilo Iwata	Suizenji Stadium
JST (UTC+09)

29 April 1998 1-9	Verdy Kawasaki	6-1	Avispa Fukuoka	Todoroki Athletics Stadium
JST (UTC+09)

2 May 1998 1-10	Avispa Fukuoka	3-1	Vissel Kobe	Hakatanomori Football Stadium
JST (UTC+09)

5 May 1998 1-11	JEF United Ichihara	4-2	Avispa Fukuoka	Ichihara Seaside Stadium
JST (UTC+09)

9 May 1998 1-12	Avispa Fukuoka	0-1	Yokohama Flügels	Hakatanomori Football Stadium
JST (UTC+09)

25 July 1998 1-13	Cerezo Osaka	3-1	Avispa Fukuoka	Osaka Nagai Stadium
JST (UTC+09)

29 July 1998 1-14	Avispa Fukuoka	1-1 (GG) (a.e.t.) (5-3 p)	Sanfrecce Hiroshima	Hakatanomori Football Stadium
JST (UTC+09)

1 August 1998 1-15	Kyoto Purple Sanga	1-0 (GG) (a.e.t.)	Avispa Fukuoka	Nishikyogoku Athletic Stadium
JST (UTC+09)

5 August 1998 1-16	Consadole Sapporo	1-2	Avispa Fukuoka	Sapporo Atsubetsu Park Stadium
JST (UTC+09)

8 August 1998 1-17	Avispa Fukuoka	0-3	Shimizu S-Pulse	Hakatanomori Football Stadium
JST (UTC+09)

22 August 1998 2-1	Sanfrecce Hiroshima	4-0	Avispa Fukuoka	Hiroshima Big Arch
JST (UTC+09)

29 August 1998 2-2	Avispa Fukuoka	0-1	Kyoto Purple Sanga	Hakatanomori Football Stadium
JST (UTC+09)

5 September 1998 2-3	Avispa Fukuoka	1-0	Consadole Sapporo	Hakatanomori Football Stadium
JST (UTC+09)

12 September 1998 2-4	Shimizu S-Pulse	6-0	Avispa Fukuoka	Nihondaira Sports Stadium
JST (UTC+09)

15 September 1998 2-5	Avispa Fukuoka	0-3	Kashima Antlers	Hakatanomori Football Stadium
JST (UTC+09)

19 September 1998 2-6	Kashiwa Reysol	1-2 (GG) (a.e.t.)	Avispa Fukuoka	Hitachi Kashiwa Soccer Stadium
JST (UTC+09)

23 September 1998 2-7	Avispa Fukuoka	1-0	Gamba Osaka	Hakatanomori Football Stadium
JST (UTC+09)

26 September 1998 2-8	Yokohama Marinos	3-0	Avispa Fukuoka	Yokohama Mitsuzawa Stadium
JST (UTC+09)

3 October 1998 2-9	Avispa Fukuoka	0-2	Urawa Red Diamonds	Hakatanomori Football Stadium
JST (UTC+09)

14 October 1998 2-10	Nagoya Grampus Eight	2-0	Avispa Fukuoka	Mizuho Athletic Stadium
JST (UTC+09)

18 October 1998 2-11	Avispa Fukuoka	0-2	Bellmare Hiratsuka	Nagasaki Athletic Stadium
JST (UTC+09)

21 October 1998 2-12	Júbilo Iwata	6-1	Avispa Fukuoka	Júbilo Iwata Stadium
JST (UTC+09)

24 October 1998 2-13	Avispa Fukuoka	2-1	Verdy Kawasaki	Hakatanomori Football Stadium
JST (UTC+09)

31 October 1998 2-14	Vissel Kobe	2-1	Avispa Fukuoka	Kobe Universiade Memorial Stadium
JST (UTC+09)

3 November 1998 2-15	Avispa Fukuoka	2-1	JEF United Ichihara	Hakatanomori Football Stadium
JST (UTC+09)

7 November 1998 2-16	Yokohama Flügels	2-1	Avispa Fukuoka	Yokohama Mitsuzawa Stadium
JST (UTC+09)

14 November 1998 2-17	Avispa Fukuoka	0-2	Cerezo Osaka	Hakatanomori Football Stadium
JST (UTC+09)

=== Emperor's Cup ===
1st Round	bye

6 December 1998 2nd Round	Sony Sendai	0-5	Avispa Fukuoka	Hakatanomori Football Stadium
JST (UTC+09)

13 December 1998 3rd Round	Kyoto Purple Sanga	2-3 (GG) (a.e.t.)	Avispa Fukuoka	Nishikyogoku Athletic Stadium
JST (UTC+09)

20 December 1998 4th Round	Avispa Fukuoka	2-3	Shimizu S-Pulse	Nihondaira Sports Stadium
JST (UTC+09)

=== J.League Cup ===
16 May 1998 GL-B-1	Kashima Antlers	3-0	Avispa Fukuoka	Kashima Soccer Stadium
JST (UTC+09)

23 May 1998 GL-B-2	Avispa Fukuoka	2-3	Kashiwa Reysol	Hakatanomori Football Stadium
JST (UTC+09)

30 May 1998 GL-B-3	Avispa Fukuoka	4-2	Yokohama Marinos	Hakatanomori Football Stadium
JST (UTC+09)

3 June 1998 GL-B-4	Cerezo Osaka	1-1	Avispa Fukuoka	Osaka Nagai Stadium
JST (UTC+09)

GL-B-5	bye

== Player statistics ==
No.	Pos.	Nat.	Player	D.o.B. (Age)	Height / Weight	J.League		Emperor's Cup		J.League Cup		Total	
No.	Pos.	Nat.	Player	D.o.B. (Age)	Height / Weight	Apps	Goals	Apps	Goals	Apps	Goals	Apps	Goals
1	GK	(Japan)	Hideki Tsukamoto	August 9, 1973 (aged 24)	cm / kg	21	0						
2	DF	(Japan)	Hideaki Mori	October 16, 1972 (aged 25)	cm / kg	18	0						
3	DF	(Japan)	Yoshinori Furube	December 9, 1970 (aged 27)	cm / kg	28	0						
4	DF	(Japan)	Atsuhiro Iwai	January 31, 1967 (aged 31)	cm / kg	32	1						
5	MF	(Brazil)	Fernando	April 3, 1967 (aged 30)	cm / kg	26	6						
6	DF	(Japan)	Takayuki Nishigaya	May 12, 1973 (aged 24)	cm / kg	25	0						
7	MF	(Japan)	Masatada Ishii	February 1, 1967 (aged 31)	cm / kg	1	0						
8	MF	(Japan)	Kiyotaka Ishimaru	October 30, 1973 (aged 24)	cm / kg	28	2						
9	FW	(Nigeria)	Michael Obiku	September 24, 1968 (aged 29)	cm / kg	10	2						
10	FW	(Spain)	Pablo Maqueda	January 18, 1971 (aged 27)	cm / kg	5	0						
10	DF	(Paraguay)	Juan Carlos Villamayor	March 5, 1969 (aged 29)	cm / kg	1	0						
11	FW	(Japan)	Yusaku Ueno	November 1, 1973 (aged 24)	cm / kg	24	1						
12	MF	(Brazil)	Marco	September 23, 1977 (aged 20)	cm / kg	3	0						
12	DF	(Serbia and Montenegro)	Miodrag Božović	June 22, 1968 (aged 29)	cm / kg	8	0						
13	MF	(Japan)	Daisuke Nakaharai	May 22, 1977 (aged 20)	cm / kg	15	3						
14	FW	(Japan)	Yoshiteru Yamashita	November 21, 1977 (aged 20)	cm / kg	32	7						
15	MF	(Japan)	Atsushi Nagai	December 23, 1974 (aged 23)	cm / kg	0	0						
16	GK	(Japan)	Tomoaki Sano	April 14, 1968 (aged 29)	cm / kg	10	0						
17	DF	(Japan)	Masaharu Nishi	May 29, 1977 (aged 20)	cm / kg	0	0						
18	MF	(Japan)	Chikara Fujimoto	October 31, 1977 (aged 20)	cm / kg	30	6						
19	DF	(Japan)	Yoshihiro Nishida	January 30, 1973 (aged 25)	cm / kg	16	1						
20	MF	(Japan)	Kentaro Sakai	May 20, 1975 (aged 22)	cm / kg	21	0						
21	GK	(Japan)	Tomonori Tateishi	April 22, 1974 (aged 23)	cm / kg	3	0						
22	DF	(Japan)	Yoshitaka Fujisaki	May 16, 1975 (aged 22)	cm / kg	0	0						
23	MF	(Japan)	Yoshiyuki Shinoda	June 18, 1971 (aged 26)	cm / kg	6	0						
24	MF	(Japan)	Tatsunori Hisanaga	December 23, 1977 (aged 20)	cm / kg	31	0						
25	MF	(Japan)	Yuji Okuma	January 19, 1969 (aged 29)	cm / kg	21	0						
26	DF	(Japan)	Koji Sato	August 24, 1977 (aged 20)	cm / kg	0	0						
27	MF	(Japan)	Yuji Yokoyama	July 6, 1969 (aged 28)	cm / kg	18	1						
28	MF	(Japan)	Shoji Ikitsu	May 20, 1977 (aged 20)	cm / kg	3	0						
29	FW	(Serbia and Montenegro)	Dragan Đukanović	October 29, 1969 (aged 28)	cm / kg	15	1						
30	GK	(Japan)	Hitoshi Sasaki	July 9, 1973 (aged 24)	cm / kg	0	0						
30	GK	(Japan)	Masaaki Furukawa	August 28, 1968 (aged 29)	cm / kg	1	0						
31	DF	(Japan)	Takuji Miyoshi	August 20, 1978 (aged 19)	cm / kg	0	0						
32	MF	(Japan)	Takanobu Kondo	August 8, 1978 (aged 19)	cm / kg	0	0						
33	FW	(Japan)	Takefumi Sasaki	July 5, 1978 (aged 19)	cm / kg	0	0						
34	MF	(Japan)	Kiyokazu Kudo	June 21, 1974 (aged 23)	cm / kg	8	1						

== Other pages ==
- (in Japanese) J. League official site
