= Yoshiyuki Shinoda =

Japanese footballer and manager

Yoshiyuki Shinoda 篠田 善之
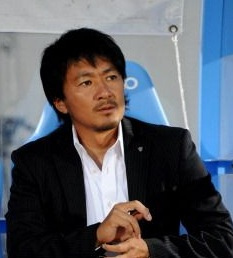
- Yoshiyuki Shinoda in 2011

Personal information
- Full name: Shinoda Yoshiyuki
- Date of birth: June 18, 1971 (age 55)
- Place of birth: Kofu, Yamanashi, Japan
- Height: 1.68 m (5 ft 6 in)
- Position: Midfielder

Team information
- Current team: Azul Claro Numazu (manager)

Youth career
- 1987–1989: Kizan Kogyo High School

College career
Years	Team	Apps	(Gls)
1991–1994	Chukyo University		

Senior career*
Years	Team	Apps	(Gls)
1990–1991	Kofu SC	1	(0)
1995–2004	Avispa Fukuoka	203	(10)
Total		204	(10)

Managerial career
- 2008–2011: Avispa Fukuoka
- 2016–2017: FC Tokyo
- 2019: Shimizu S-Pulse
- 2023–2024: Ventforet Kofu
- 2025: Nantong Zhiyun
- 2026-: Azul Claro Numazu
- * Club domestic league appearances and goals

Yoshiyuki Shinoda (篠田 善之, Shinoda Yoshiyuki; born June 18, 1971) is a former Japanese football player and manager.

== Club career ==
Shinoda was born in Kofu on June 18, 1971. After graduating from high school, he joined Japan Soccer League club Kofu SC in 1990. Although stayed there for the whole season, he only played one match. In 1991, he entered Chuo University. After graduating from Chuo University, he joined Japan Football League club Fukuoka Blux (later Avispa Fukuoka) in 1995. The club won the championship in 1995 and was then, promoted to the J1 League from 1996. He played many matches there as a defensive midfielder for a long time. On 2001, as the club finished on 15th place at the league, the club was relegated to J2 League from 2002. He retired at the end of 2004 season, with Fukuoka still being on the J2.

== Managerial career ==
After retirement, Shinoda started his coaching career at Avispa Fukuoka, on 2005. He coached both the top team and its youth team. In July 2008, Shinoda received his opportunity to become the top-team manager, following the dismissal of former coach Pierre Littbarski. The club finished as 3rd place in the 2010 J2 League, earning promotion to the J1 League. However, on 2011, due to underperforming matches and a poor run of results, he was sacked in August. In 2012, he was signed by FC Tokyo as an assistant coach. In July 2016, manager Hiroshi Jofuku was sacked, giving Shinoda another managerial opportunity. However, he was sacked in September 2017. In 2018, he signed with Shimizu S-Pulse, and became an assistant coach of Jan Jönsson. In May 2019, Jönsson was sacked, and Shinoda became the club's manager, being it the third time he was promoted from his assistant coach role since 2005. On 30 November 2022, Shinoda was signed by Ventforet Kofu, who sacked former manager Yoshida. Despite winning an unexpected Emperor's Cup title for them, he was sacked right after it, as underperformances in the J2 League saw the club finish on 18th place out of the 22 participating teams. He will start to manage the club from the 2023 season, returning to Kofu after 31 years, since leaving it in his playing career on 1991.

In January 2025, Shinoda moved to China League One club Nantong Zhiyun. In August of the same year, Shinoda left Nantong Zhiyun.

== Club statistics ==
Club performance			League		Cup		League Cup		Total	
Season	Club	League	Apps	Goals	Apps	Goals	Apps	Goals	Apps	Goals
Japan			League		Emperor's Cup		League Cup		Total	
1990/91	Kofu SC	JSL Division 2	1	0			0	0	1	0
1995	Fukuoka Blux	Football League	0	0	2	0	-		2	0
1996	Avispa Fukuoka	J1 League	14	0	0	0	3	0	17	0
1997	Avispa Fukuoka	J1 League	29	0	3	0	4	0	36	0
1998	Avispa Fukuoka	J1 League	6	0	3	3	1	0	10	3
1999	Avispa Fukuoka	J1 League	27	2	0	0	2	0	29	2
2000	Avispa Fukuoka	J1 League	13	0	1	0	3	0	17	0
2001	Avispa Fukuoka	J1 League	20	0	1	0	3	0	24	0
2002	Avispa Fukuoka	J2 League	43	5	4	0	-		47	5
2003	Avispa Fukuoka	J2 League	34	2	2	0	-		36	2
2004	Avispa Fukuoka	J2 League	17	1	0	0	-		17	1
Career total			204	10	16	3	16	0	236	13

== Managerial statistics ==
As of the end of 2024 season

Team	From	To	Record				
Team	From	To	G	W	D	L	Win %
Avispa Fukuoka	2008	2011	124	47	30	47	37.90
FC Tokyo	2016	2017	37	17	8	12	45.95
Shimizu S-Pulse	2019	2020	29	14	4	11	48.28
Ventforet Kofu	2023	2024	77	30	19	28	38.96
Total			267	108	61	98	40.45
