= Tatsunori Hisanaga =

Japanese footballer

Tatsunori Hisanaga 久永 辰徳
Personal information
- Full name: Tatsunori Hisanaga
- Date of birth: December 23, 1977 (age 48)
- Place of birth: Aira, Kagoshima, Japan
- Height: 1.72 m (5 ft 7 1/2 in)
- Position: Midfielder

Youth career
- 1993–1995: Kagoshima Jitsugyo High School

Senior career*
Years	Team	Apps	(Gls)
1996–2009	Avispa Fukuoka	204	(11)
2002	→ Yokohama F. Marinos (loan)	20	(2)
2004–2006	→ Omiya Ardija (loan)	101	(8)
2010	Volca Kagoshima	2	(0)
Total		327	(21)
Medal record
Yokohama F. Marinos
Runner-up	J1 League	2002
- * Club domestic league appearances and goals

Tatsunori Hisanaga (久永 辰徳, Hisanaga Tatsunori; born December 23, 1977) is a former Japanese football player.

== Playing career ==
Hisanaga was born in Aira on December 23, 1977. After graduating from high school, he joined newly was promoted to the J1 League club, Avispa Fukuoka in 1996. He played many matches during his first season. However the club results were poor and it was demoted to the J2 League in 2002. That year, he moved to Yokohama F. Marinos on loan. He played many matches and the club won second place in the 2002 J1 League. In 2003, he returned to Avispa. However he did not play much and in 2004, he moved to the J2 club Omiya Ardija. He played as a regular player and the club was promoted to J1 in 2005. In 2007, he returned to Avispa again. He played as a regular player until 2008. However he did not play in any matches in 2009 and left the club at the end of the 2009 season. In July 2010, he moved to his local club Volca Kagoshima in the Regional Leagues. He retired at the end of the 2010 season.

== Career statistics ==
Appearances and goals by club, season and competition
Club	Season	League			Emperor's Cup		J.League Cup		Total	
Club	Season	Division	Apps	Goals	Apps	Goals	Apps	Goals	Apps	Goals
Avispa Fukuoka	1996	J1 League	10	0	1	0	4	0	15	0
Avispa Fukuoka	1997	J1 League	19	1	2	0	1	0	22	1
Avispa Fukuoka	1998	J1 League	31	0	2	0	4	0	37	0
Avispa Fukuoka	1999	J1 League	10	0	2	0	3	0	15	0
Avispa Fukuoka	2000	J1 League	27	4	2	1	4	0	33	5
Avispa Fukuoka	2001	J1 League	21	3	1	0	3	0	25	3
Yokohama F. Marinos	2002	J1 League	20	2	1	0	3	0	24	2
Avispa Fukuoka	2003	J2 League	7	0	0	0	—		7	0
Omiya Ardija	2004	J2 League	40	2	3	0	—		43	2
Omiya Ardija	2005	J1 League	32	3	3	0	7	1	42	4
Omiya Ardija	2006	J1 League	29	3	2	0	4	0	35	3
Avispa Fukuoka	2007	J2 League	42	1	2	0	—		44	1
Avispa Fukuoka	2008	J2 League	34	2	1	0	—		35	2
Avispa Fukuoka	2009	J2 League	3	0	0	0	—		3	0
Volca Kagoshima	2010	Regional Leagues	2	0	—		—		2	0
Career total			327	21	22	1	33	1	382	23
