= Masayuki Nakagomi =

Japanese footballer

Masayuki Nakagomi 中込 正行
Personal information
- Full name: Masayuki Nakagomi
- Date of birth: August 17, 1967 (age 59)
- Place of birth: Yamanashi, Japan
- Height: 1.73 m (5 ft 8 in)
- Position: Defender

Youth career
- 1983–1985: Kizan Technical High School
- 1986–1989: Nippon Sport Science University

Senior career*
Years	Team	Apps	(Gls)
1990–1993	Toshiba	62	(3)
1994	PJM Futures	30	(2)
1995–1997	Avispa Fukuoka	54	(0)
Total		146	(5)
- * Club domestic league appearances and goals

Masayuki Nakagomi (中込 正行, Nakagomi Masayuki), born August 17, 1967, is a former Japanese football player.

== Playing career ==
Nakagomi was born in Yamanashi Prefecture on August 17, 1967. After graduating from Nippon Sport Science University, he joined Toshiba in 1990. He played many matches from his first season. In 1994, he moved to Japan Football League (JFL) club PJM Futures. He played all of the team’s matches in 1994 season. In 1995, he moved to JFL club Fukuoka Blux (later Avispa Fukuoka). He played as a regular player and the club won the championship in 1995 and was promoted to J1 League from 1996. He retired at the end of 1997 season.

== Career statistics ==
Appearances and goals by club, season and competition
Club	Season	League			Emperor's Cup		J.League Cup		Total	
Club	Season	Division	Apps	Goals	Apps	Goals	Apps	Goals	Apps	Goals
Toshiba	1990–91	JSL Division 1	11	0			2	0	13	0
Toshiba	1991–92	JSL Division 1	16	0			0	0	16	0
Toshiba	1992	Football League	18	3			-		18	3
Toshiba	1993	Football League	17	0	2	0	-		19	0
PJM Futures	1994	Football League	30	2	1	0	-		31	2
Fukuoka Blux	1995	Football League	26	0	3	0	-		29	0
Avispa Fukuoka	1996	J1 League	14	0	0	0	14	0	28	0
Avispa Fukuoka	1997	J1 League	14	0	0	0	0	0	14	0
Career total			146	5	6	0	16	0	168	5
