= Takahiro Endo =

Japanese footballer

Takahiro Endo 遠藤 孝弘
Personal information
- Full name: Takahiro Endo
- Date of birth: July 7, 1968 (age 58)
- Place of birth: Shimada, Japan
- Height: 1.66 m (5 ft 5 1/2 in)
- Position: Forward

Youth career
- 1984–1986: Shizuoka Gakuen High School

Senior career*
Years	Team	Apps	(Gls)
1987–1996	Avispa Fukuoka		
1997	Sagawa Express Tokyo		
- * Club domestic league appearances and goals

Takahiro Endo (遠藤 孝弘, Endō Takahiro; born July 7, 1968) is a former Japanese football player.

== Playing career ==
Endo was born in Shimada on July 7, 1968. After graduating from Shizuoka Gakuen High School, he joined Prefectural Leagues club Chuo Bohan (later Avispa Fukuoka) in 1987. He played many matches as forward and the club was promoted to Regional Leagues in 1988 and Japan Soccer League in 1991. In 1992, Japan Soccer League was folded and founded the club joined new league Japan Football League. The club won the champions in 1995 and was promoted to J1 League from 1996. In 1997, he moved to Sagawa Express Tokyo. He retired end of 1997 season.

== Club statistics ==
Club performance			League		Cup		League Cup		Total	
Season	Club	League	Apps	Goals	Apps	Goals	Apps	Goals	Apps	Goals
Japan			League		Emperor's Cup		J.League Cup		Total	
1987	Chuo Bohan	Prefectural Leagues								
1988	Chuo Bohan	Regional Leagues								
1989	Chuo Bohan	Regional Leagues								
1990	Chuo Bohan	Regional Leagues								
1991/92	Chuo Bohan	JSL Division 2	28	18			1	0	29	18
1992	Chuo Bohan	Football League	18	16					18	16
1993	Chuo Bohan	Football League	17	8					17	8
1994	Fujieda Blux	Football League	26	6	1	0	-		27	6
1995	Fukuoka Blux	Football League	9	0	1	0	-		10	0
1996	Avispa Fukuoka	J1 League	10	2	2	0	11	1	23	3
Total			108	10	4	0	12	1	124	11
