= Carlos Mayor =

Argentine footballer (born 1965)

Personal information
- Full name: Carlos Alberto Mayor
- Date of birth: 5 October 1965 (age 61)
- Place of birth: Buenos Aires, Argentina
- Height: 1.80 m (5 ft 11 in)
- Position: Defender

Team information
- Current team: Defensores de Belgrano (manager)

Youth career
- 1980–1984: Argentinos Juniors

Senior career*
Years	Team	Apps	(Gls)
1985–1990	Argentinos Juniors	104	(7)
1990–1991	Gimnasia LP	38	(2)
1991–1992	Unión Santa Fe	32	(2)
1993	Deportes Iquique	18	(0)
1994–1996	Avispa Fukuoka	26	(2)
1997–1999	All Boys	56	(12)
1999–2000	Deportivo Español	4	(0)

International career
1988	Argentina		

Managerial career
- 2011–2013: Argentinos Juniors (youth)
- 2012: Argentinos Juniors (caretaker)
- 2013–2014: Almagro
- 2014: Atlanta
- 2014: Godoy Cruz
- 2015: San Martín SJ
- 2016: Argentinos Juniors
- 2016: Temperley
- 2017: Almagro
- 2017: Renofa Yamaguchi
- 2018–2019: Boca Unidos
- 2019: Almagro
- 2021–2022: Olimpo
- 2022–2023: Santamarina
- 2023–2025: Defensores de Belgrano
- 2025: Chacarita Juniors
- 2026: Club Atlético Mitre
- 2026–: Almagro
- * Club domestic league appearances and goals

Carlos Alberto Mayor (born 5 October 1965) is an Argentine former professional footballer who played as a defender.

== Teams ==
- (Argentina) Argentinos Juniors 1985–1990
- (Argentina) Gimnasia y Esgrima de La Plata 1990–1991
- (Argentina) Unión de Santa Fe 1991–1992
- (Chile) Deportes Iquique 1993
- (Japan) Avispa Fukuoka 1994–1996
- (Argentina) All Boys 1997–1999
- (Argentina) Deportivo Español 1999–2000

== Career statistics ==
Club performance			League		Cup		League Cup		Total	
Season	Club	League	Apps	Goals	Apps	Goals	Apps	Goals	Apps	Goals
Japan			League		Emperor's Cup		J.League Cup		Total	
1994	Fujieda Blux	Football League								
1995	Fukuoka Blux	Football League								
1996	Avispa Fukuoka	J1 League	26	2	3	1	9	0	38	3
Total			26	2	3	1	9	0	38	3

== Managerial statistics ==
Team	From	To	Record				
Team	From	To	G	W	D	L	Win %
Renofa Yamaguchi FC	2017	2017	25	9	1	15	36.00
Total			25	9	1	15	36.00
