= Hideki Tsukamoto =

Japanese footballer

Hideki Tsukamoto 塚本 秀樹
Personal information
- Full name: Hideki Tsukamoto
- Date of birth: August 9, 1973 (age 53)
- Place of birth: Nagasaki, Japan
- Height: 1.78 m (5 ft 10 in)
- Position: Goalkeeper

Youth career
- 1989–1991: Kunimi High School
- 1992–1995: Meiji University

Senior career*
Years	Team	Apps	(Gls)
1996–2005	Avispa Fukuoka	93	(0)
2006	V-Varen Nagasaki	0	(0)
Total		93	(0)
- * Club domestic league appearances and goals

Hideki Tsukamoto (塚本 秀樹, Tsukamoto Hideki; born August 9, 1973) is a Japanese former football goalkeeper. He is currently the goalkeeper coach of J1 League club Avispa Fukuoka.

== Playing career ==
Tsukamoto was born in Nagasaki Prefecture on August 9, 1973. After graduating from Meiji University, he joined newly was promoted to J1 League club, Avispa Fukuoka in 1996. He battles with Tomoaki Sano for the position and played many matches until 1998. However Avispa gained Nobuyuki Kojima in 1999 and Tsukamoto could hardly play in the match behind Kojima from 1999. In late 2001, he became a regular goalkeeper instead Kojima. However Avispa was relegated to J2 League from 2002. Although Kojima left Avispa end of 2001 season, Avispa gained Tomoaki Ogami in 2002 and Tsukamoto could not play many matches. In 2003, Yuichi Mizutani returned to Avispa. Although Tsukamoto battles with Mizutani for the position and played many matches in 2003, he could hardly play in the match from 2004. He retired end of 2005 season. In October 2006, he came back as player at Regional Leagues club V-Varen Nagasaki. He retired end of 2006 season again.

== Club statistics ==
Club performance			League		Cup		League Cup		Total	
Season	Club	League	Apps	Goals	Apps	Goals	Apps	Goals	Apps	Goals
Japan			League		Emperor's Cup		J.League Cup		Total	
1996	Avispa Fukuoka	J1 League	18	0	2	0	14	0	34	0
1997	Avispa Fukuoka	J1 League	11	0	0	0	6	0	17	0
1998	Avispa Fukuoka	J1 League	21	0	3	0	0	0	24	0
1999	Avispa Fukuoka	J1 League	0	0	0	0	0	0	0	0
2000	Avispa Fukuoka	J1 League	0	0	1	0	2	0	3	0
2001	Avispa Fukuoka	J1 League	14	0	1	0	0	0	15	0
2002	Avispa Fukuoka	J2 League	7	0	4	0	-		11	0
2003	Avispa Fukuoka	J2 League	21	0	0	0	-		21	0
2004	Avispa Fukuoka	J2 League	1	0	1	0	-		2	0
2005	Avispa Fukuoka	J2 League	0	0	1	0	-		1	0
2006	V-Varen Nagasaki	Regional Leagues	0	0	-		-		0	0
Career total			93	0	13	0	22	0	128	0
