= Tomoaki Sano =

Japanese footballer

Tomoaki Sano 佐野 友昭
Personal information
- Full name: Tomoaki Sano
- Date of birth: April 14, 1968 (age 58)
- Place of birth: Shizuoka, Japan
- Height: 1.82 m (5 ft 11 1/2 in)
- Position: Goalkeeper

Youth career
- 1984–1986: Tokai University Daiichi High School

Senior career*
Years	Team	Apps	(Gls)
1987–1992	Nagoya Grampus Eight	24	(0)
1992	NKK	0	(0)
1993–1998	Avispa Fukuoka	109	(0)
1999	Sagawa Express Tokyo	0	(0)
2000	Mito HollyHock	0	(0)
Total		133	(0)
- * Club domestic league appearances and goals

Tomoaki Sano (佐野 友昭, Sano Tomoaki; born April 14, 1968) is a Japanese former football player.

== Playing career ==
Sano was born in Shizuoka Prefecture on April 14, 1968. After graduating from high school, he joined Japan Soccer League club Toyota Motors (later Nagoya Grampus Eight) in 1987. However, he could not play many matches. In 1992, Japan Soccer League was folded and founded new league J1 League. He moved to Japan Football League (JFL) club NKK during 1992 season but he could not play in a match at all. Later, he moved to JFL club Chuo Bohan (later Avispa Fukuoka) in 1993. He became a regular goalkeeper and the club won the championship in 1995 and was promoted to J1. However, his opportunity to play had started to fall behind newcomer Hideki Tsukamoto as of 1996. In 1999, he moved to Japan Football League club Sagawa Express Tokyo. But once again, he could not play in a match at all. In 2000, after he could not play a match in a recently promoted J2 League club, Mito HollyHock which he signed with, he retired at end of 2000 season.

== Club statistics ==
Club performance			League		Cup		League Cup		Total	
Season	Club	League	Apps	Goals	Apps	Goals	Apps	Goals	Apps	Goals
Japan			League		Emperor's Cup		J.League Cup		Total	
1987/88	Toyota Motors	JSL Division 1	0	0			0	0	0	0
1988/89	Toyota Motors	JSL Division 2	5	0			0	0	5	0
1989/90	Toyota Motors	JSL Division 2	15	0			1	0	16	0
1990/91	Toyota Motors	JSL Division 1	3	0			0	0	3	0
1991/92	Toyota Motors	JSL Division 1	1	0			0	0	1	0
1992	Nagoya Grampus Eight	J1 League	-				0	0	0	0
1992	NKK	Football League	0	0			-		0	0
1993	Chuo Bohan	Football League	18	0	1	0	-		19	0
1994	Fujieda Blux	Football League	28	0	1	0	-		29	0
1995	Fukuoka Blux	Football League	30	0	0	0	-		30	0
1996	Avispa Fukuoka	J1 League	7	0	0	0	0	0	7	0
1997	Avispa Fukuoka	J1 League	16	0	3	0	0	0	19	0
1998	Avispa Fukuoka	J1 League	10	0	0	0	4	0	14	0
1999	Sagawa Express Tokyo	Football League	0	0	0	0	-		0	0
2000	Mito HollyHock	J2 League	0	0	0	0	0	0	0	0
Total			133	0	5	0	5	0	143	0
