= Nobuyuki Kojima =

Japanese footballer

Nobuyuki Kojima 小島 伸幸
Personal information
- Date of birth: January 17, 1966 (age 60)
- Place of birth: Maebashi, Gunma, Japan
- Height: 1.87 m (6 ft 2 in)
- Position: Goalkeeper

Youth career
- 1981–1983: Niijima Gakuen High School

College career
Years	Team	Apps	(Gls)
1984–1987	Doshisha University		

Senior career*
Years	Team	Apps	(Gls)
1988–1998	Bellmare Hiratsuka	186	(0)
1999–2001	Avispa Fukuoka	67	(0)
2002–2005	Thespa Kusatsu	67	(0)
Total		320	(0)

International career
1995–1996	Japan	4	(0)
Medal record
Bellmare Hiratsuka
Winner	Emperor's Cup	1994
Runner-up	Emperor's Cup	1988
- * Club domestic league appearances and goals

Nobuyuki Kojima (小島 伸幸, Kojima Nobuyuki; born January 17, 1966) is a Japanese former professional footballer who played as a goalkeeper. He played for the Japan national team.

He played for several clubs, including Bellmare Hiratsuka, Avispa Fukuoka and Thespa Kusatsu. He played for the Japan national team (4 matches) and was a participant at the 1998 World Cup.

== Club career ==
Kojima started playing football when he was in the 5th grade and was converted to a goalkeeper at high school. After graduating from Doshisha University in 1988, Kojima joined Fujita Industries (later Bellmare Hiratsuka) playing in the Japan Soccer League Division 1. He became a regular starting member of the team in 1994. He had been playing for the club as an employee of Fujita Industries but turned professional in January 1995.

At the end of 1998, Bellmare released their main players including Kojima as well as Wagner Lopes, Hong Myung-bo, Kazuaki Tasaka and Yoshihiro Natsuka due to their financial problems. Kojima moved to Avispa Fukuoka. He further moved to Thespa Kusatsu in 2002 that played in the Gunma Prefectural League division 2. As a player - assistant coach, he was instrumental in the team's promotion to the Japan Football League, then J2 League. His last competitive game was against Consadole Sapporo on December 3, 2005 and he announced his retirement from the game in January 2006.

== International career ==
In January 1995, Kojima was selected by the Japan national team for the 1995 King Fahd Cup, but did not play any game in the tournament. He played on June 6, 1995 against Brazil in the Umbro Cup. He played four games for Japan until 1996. He was in the squad for the 1996 AFC Asian Cup and 1998 FIFA World Cup as reserve goalkeeper but did not play any game in the tournament.

== After retirement ==
Kojima is currently an advisor for Kusatsu. He also serves as a pundit for NHK, as of February 2010.

== Career statistics ==
=== Club ===
Appearances and goals by club, season and competition
Club	Season	League			Emperor's Cup		J.League Cup		Total	
Club	Season	Division	Apps	Goals	Apps	Goals	Apps	Goals	Apps	Goals
Bellmare Hiratsuka (Note: "Fujita Industries" until 1994)	1988–89	JSL Division 1	5	0					5	0
Bellmare Hiratsuka	1989–90	JSL Division 1	7	0			0	0	7	0
Bellmare Hiratsuka	1990–91	JSL Division 2	2	0			1	0	3	0
Bellmare Hiratsuka	1991–92	JSL Division 2	0	0			0	0	0	0
Bellmare Hiratsuka	1992	Football League	0	0			—		0	0
Bellmare Hiratsuka	1993	Football League	0	0					0	0
Bellmare Hiratsuka	1994	J1 League	41	0	5	0	1	0	47	0
Bellmare Hiratsuka	1995	J1 League	47	0	2	0	—		49	0
Bellmare Hiratsuka	1996	J1 League	29	0	3	0	15	0	47	0
Bellmare Hiratsuka	1997	J1 League	21	0	3	0	0	0	24	0
Bellmare Hiratsuka	1998	J1 League	34	0					34	0
Avispa Fukuoka	1999	J1 League	29	0	2	0	3	0	34	0
Avispa Fukuoka	2000	J1 League	30	0	1	0	2	0	33	0
Avispa Fukuoka	2001	J1 League	8	0	0	0	1	0	9	0
Thespa Kusatsu	2002	Prefectural Leagues	6	0	3	0	—		9	0
Thespa Kusatsu	2003	Regional Leagues	12	0	2	0	—		14	0
Thespa Kusatsu	2004	Football League	26	0	5	0	—		31	0
Thespa Kusatsu	2005	J2 League	23	0	1	0	—		24	0
Career total			320	0	27	0	23	0	370	0

=== International ===
Appearances and goals by national team and year
National team	Year	Apps	Goals
Japan	1995	3	0
Japan	1996	1	0
Total		4	0

== Honours ==
Emperor's Cup: 1994

Asian Cup Winner's Cup: 1995
