= Yoshikazu Isoda =

Japanese footballer

Yoshikazu Isoda 礒田 由和
Personal information
- Full name: Yoshikazu Isoda
- Date of birth: May 27, 1965 (age 61)
- Place of birth: Kyoto, Japan
- Height: 1.87 m (6 ft 1 1/2 in)
- Position: Defender

Youth career
- 1981–1983: Yamashiro High School
- 1984–1987: Doshisha University

Senior career*
Years	Team	Apps	(Gls)
1988–1993	NKK	69	(4)
1994–1996	Avispa Fukuoka	31	(3)
Total		100	(7)
- * Club domestic league appearances and goals

Yoshikazu Isoda (礒田 由和, Isoda Yoshikazu; born May 27, 1965) is a former Japanese football player.

== Playing career ==
Isoda was born in Kyoto Prefecture on May 27, 1965. After graduating from Doshisha University, he joined NKK in 1988. Although he played in many matches, the club was disbanded at the end of the 1993 season. In 1994, he moved to the Japan Football League club Fujieda Blux (later Fukuoka Blux, Avispa Fukuoka). In 1995, he was a regular player and the club won the championship. The club was promoted to the J1 League in 1996. However he did not play as much, and retired at the end of the 1996 season.

== Club statistics ==
Club performance			League		Cup		League Cup		Total	
Season	Club	League	Apps	Goals	Apps	Goals	Apps	Goals	Apps	Goals
Japan			League		Emperor's Cup		J.League Cup		Total	
1988/89	NKK	JSL Division 1	10	0					10	0
1989/90	NKK	JSL Division 1	22	0			2	1	24	1
1990/91	NKK	JSL Division 1	7	0			0	0	7	0
1991/92	NKK	JSL Division 2	15	1			0	0	15	1
1992	NKK	Football League	11	2			-		11	2
1993	NKK	Football League	4	1	1	0	-		5	1
1994	Fujieda Blux	Football League	0	0	0	0	-		0	0
1995	Fukuoka Blux	Football League	27	3	3	0	-		30	3
1996	Avispa Fukuoka	J1 League	4	0	0	0	0	0	4	0
Total			100	7	4	0	2	1	106	8
