= Nestor Omar Piccoli =

Argentine footballer

Personal information
- Full name: Nestor Omar Piccoli
- Date of birth: 20 January 1965 (age 61)
- Place of birth: Buenos Aires, Argentina
- Height: 1.79 m (5 ft 10 1/2 in)
- Position: Striker

Senior career*
Years	Team	Apps	(Gls)
1984	River Plate		
1985–1986	Unión		
1986	Temperley		
1987	River Plate		
1987–1990	All Nippon Airways		
1990–1991	Gimnasia LP	11	(0)
1992–1995	Chuo Bohan / Fujieda Blux / Fukuoka Blux		

Managerial career
- 2000–2001: Avispa Fukuoka
- 2003: Shizuoka
- * Club domestic league appearances and goals

Nestor Omar Piccoli (born January 20, 1965) is a former Argentine football player.

He was the first top scorer of the Japanese third tier, scoring 18 goals with Chuo Bohan, forerunner to Avispa Fukuoka. He moved with the team from Fujieda to Fukuoka and retired with them after their promotion to the Japanese top division.

After he retired from playing, Piccoli became a football coach. He worked as an assistant to Julio César Falcioni with Boca Juniors.

== Managerial statistics ==
Team	From	To	Record				
Team	From	To	G	W	D	L	Win %
Avispa Fukuoka	2000	2001	60	22	4	34	36.67
Total			60	22	4	34	36.67
