= 2006 Avispa Fukuoka season =

Avispa Fukuoka
2006 season
- Manager: Hiroshi Matsuda; Ryoichi Kawakatsu
- Stadium: Hakatanomori Football Stadium
- J. League 1: 16th
- Emperor's Cup: 5th Round
- J. League Cup: GL-A 3rd
- Top goalscorer: Mitsunori Yabuta (5)

2006 Avispa Fukuoka season

== Competitions ==
Competitions	Position
J. League 1	16th / 18 clubs
Emperor's Cup	5th Round
J. League Cup	GL-A 3rd / 4 clubs

== Domestic results ==
=== J. League 1 ===
Match	Date	Venue	Opponents	Score
1	2006..			-
2	2006..			-
3	2006..			-
4	2006..			-
5	2006..			-
6	2006..			-
7	2006..			-
8	2006..			-
9	2006..			-
10	2006..			-
11	2006..			-
12	2006..			-
13	2006..			-
14	2006..			-
15	2006..			-
16	2006..			-
17	2006..			-
18	2006..			-
19	2006..			-
20	2006..			-
21	2006..			-
22	2006..			-
23	2006..			-
24	2006..			-
25	2006..			-
26	2006..			-
27	2006..			-
28	2006..			-
29	2006..			-
30	2006..			-
31	2006..			-
32	2006..			-
33	2006..			-
34	2006..			-

=== Emperor's Cup ===
Match	Date	Venue	Opponents	Score
4th Round	2006..			-
5th Round	2006..			-

=== J. League Cup ===
Match	Date	Venue	Opponents	Score
GL-A-1	2006..			-
GL-A-2	2006..			-
GL-A-3	2006..			-
GL-A-4	2006..			-
GL-A-5	2006..			-
GL-A-6	2006..			-

== Player statistics ==
No.	Pos.	Player	D.o.B. (Age)	Height / Weight	J. League 1		Emperor's Cup		J. League Cup		Total	
No.	Pos.	Player	D.o.B. (Age)	Height / Weight	Apps	Goals	Apps	Goals	Apps	Goals	Apps	Goals
1	GK	Yuichi Mizutani	May 26, 1980 (aged 25)	cm / kg	33	0						
2	DF	Toru Miyamoto	December 3, 1982 (aged 23)	cm / kg	20	0						
3	DF	Alex	April 16, 1983 (aged 22)	cm / kg	30	2						
4	DF	Seiji Kaneko	May 27, 1980 (aged 25)	cm / kg	18	1						
5	DF	Mitsuru Chiyotanda	June 1, 1980 (aged 25)	cm / kg	26	1						
6	MF	Takanori Nunobe	September 23, 1973 (aged 32)	cm / kg	22	3						
7	MF	Kohei Miyazaki	February 6, 1981 (aged 25)	cm / kg	7	1						
8	MF	Roberto	February 20, 1979 (aged 27)	cm / kg	31	0						
9	FW	Mitsunori Yabuta	May 2, 1976 (aged 29)	cm / kg	29	5						
10	MF	Kiyokazu Kudo	June 21, 1974 (aged 31)	cm / kg	29	1						
11	MF	Kyohei Yamagata	September 7, 1981 (aged 24)	cm / kg	4	0						
13	MF	Yuki Matsushita	December 7, 1981 (aged 24)	cm / kg	3	0						
13	MF	Naoya Saeki	December 18, 1977 (aged 28)	cm / kg	21	1						
14	MF	Seiji Koga	August 7, 1979 (aged 26)	cm / kg	21	1						
15	MF	Koji Yoshimura	April 13, 1976 (aged 29)	cm / kg	16	0						
16	GK	Ryuichi Kamiyama	November 10, 1984 (aged 21)	cm / kg	1	0						
17	DF	Shinya Kawashima	July 20, 1978 (aged 27)	cm / kg	12	0						
18	FW	Ryota Arimitsu	April 21, 1981 (aged 24)	cm / kg	11	0						
19	DF	Satoshi Nagano	August 2, 1982 (aged 23)	cm / kg	3	0						
19	FW	Baron	January 19, 1974 (aged 32)	cm / kg	13	0						
20	FW	Hiroyuki Hayashi	October 5, 1983 (aged 22)	cm / kg	6	0						
21	DF	Tatsunori Yamagata	October 4, 1983 (aged 22)	cm / kg	6	0						
22	DF	Hokuto Nakamura	July 10, 1985 (aged 20)	cm / kg	30	4						
23	DF	Tomokazu Nagira	October 17, 1985 (aged 20)	cm / kg	8	0						
24	DF	Takashi Hirajima	February 3, 1982 (aged 24)	cm / kg	2	0						
25	GK	Fumiya Iwamaru	December 4, 1981 (aged 24)	cm / kg	0	0						
26	MF	Hisashi Jogo	April 16, 1986 (aged 19)	cm / kg	25	4						
27	FW	Yūsuke Tanaka	February 3, 1986 (aged 20)	cm / kg	22	2						
28	MF	Kazuyuki Otsuka	July 7, 1982 (aged 23)	cm / kg	0	0						
29	DF	Yasuomi Kugisaki	May 3, 1982 (aged 23)	cm / kg	1	0						
30	GK	Yuji Rokutan	April 10, 1987 (aged 18)	cm / kg	0	0						
31	MF	Shingo Honda	November 23, 1987 (aged 18)	cm / kg	0	0						
32	MF	Kengo Takushima	May 15, 1987 (aged 18)	cm / kg	0	0						
33	FW	Tadaomi Yasuda	August 4, 1987 (aged 18)	cm / kg	0	0						
34	FW	Kazunori Iio	February 23, 1982 (aged 24)	cm / kg	17	4						
35	FW	Alexandre	May 9, 1987 (aged 18)	cm / kg	0	0						
36	FW	Gláucio	November 11, 1975 (aged 30)	cm / kg	7	1						

== Other pages ==
- (in Japanese) J. League official site
