= 2004 Avispa Fukuoka season =

Avispa Fukuoka
2004 season
- Manager: Hiroshi Matsuda
- Stadium: Hakatanomori Football Stadium
- J. League 2: 3rd
- Emperor's Cup: 4th Round
- Top goalscorer: Seiji Koga (9)
Home colours	Away colours

During the 2004 season, Avispa Fukuoka competed in the J. League 2, in which they finished 3rd.

== Competitions ==
Competitions	Position
J. League 2	3rd / 12 clubs
Emperor's Cup	4th Round

== Domestic results ==
=== J. League 2 ===
Match	Date	Venue	Opponents	Score
1	2004..	[[]]	[[]]	-
2	2004..	[[]]	[[]]	-
3	2004..	[[]]	[[]]	-
4	2004..	[[]]	[[]]	-
5	2004..	[[]]	[[]]	-
6	2004..	[[]]	[[]]	-
7	2004..	[[]]	[[]]	-
8	2004..	[[]]	[[]]	-
9	2004..	[[]]	[[]]	-
10	2004..	[[]]	[[]]	-
11	2004..	[[]]	[[]]	-
12	2004..	[[]]	[[]]	-
13	2004..	[[]]	[[]]	-
14	2004..	[[]]	[[]]	-
15	2004..	[[]]	[[]]	-
16	2004..	[[]]	[[]]	-
17	2004..	[[]]	[[]]	-
18	2004..	[[]]	[[]]	-
19	2004..	[[]]	[[]]	-
20	2004..	[[]]	[[]]	-
21	2004..	[[]]	[[]]	-
22	2004..	[[]]	[[]]	-
23	2004..	[[]]	[[]]	-
24	2004..	[[]]	[[]]	-
25	2004..	[[]]	[[]]	-
26	2004..	[[]]	[[]]	-
27	2004..	[[]]	[[]]	-
28	2004..	[[]]	[[]]	-
29	2004..	[[]]	[[]]	-
30	2004..	[[]]	[[]]	-
31	2004..	[[]]	[[]]	-
32	2004..	[[]]	[[]]	-
33	2004..	[[]]	[[]]	-
34	2004..	[[]]	[[]]	-
35	2004..	[[]]	[[]]	-
36	2004..	[[]]	[[]]	-
37	2004..	[[]]	[[]]	-
38	2004..	[[]]	[[]]	-
39	2004..	[[]]	[[]]	-
40	2004..	[[]]	[[]]	-
41	2004..	[[]]	[[]]	-
42	2004..	[[]]	[[]]	-
43	2004..	[[]]	[[]]	-
44	2004..	[[]]	[[]]	-

=== Emperor's Cup ===
Match	Date	Venue	Opponents	Score
3rd Round	2004..	[[]]	[[]]	-
4th Round	2004..	[[]]	[[]]	-

== Player statistics ==
No.	Pos.	Player	D.o.B. (Age)	Height / Weight	J. League 2		Emperor's Cup		Total	
No.	Pos.	Player	D.o.B. (Age)	Height / Weight	Apps	Goals	Apps	Goals	Apps	Goals
1	GK	Yuichi Mizutani	May 26, 1980 (aged 23)	cm / kg	43	0				
2	DF	Asuka Tateishi	June 9, 1983 (aged 20)	cm / kg	3	0				
3	DF	Alex	April 16, 1983 (aged 20)	cm / kg	36	4				
4	DF	Shinya Kawashima	July 20, 1978 (aged 25)	cm / kg	12	0				
5	DF	Mitsuru Chiyotanda	June 1, 1980 (aged 23)	cm / kg	43	5				
6	MF	Yoshiyuki Shinoda	June 18, 1971 (aged 32)	cm / kg	17	1				
7	MF	Kohei Miyazaki	February 6, 1981 (aged 23)	cm / kg	35	0				
8	MF	Roberto	February 20, 1979 (aged 25)	cm / kg	30	2				
9	FW	Hiroyuki Hayashi	October 5, 1983 (aged 20)	cm / kg	15	1				
10	MF	Yuji Miyahara	July 19, 1980 (aged 23)	cm / kg	0	0				
11	FW	Hiroshi Fukushima	July 14, 1982 (aged 21)	cm / kg	19	1				
13	FW	Bentinho	December 18, 1971 (aged 32)	cm / kg	20	4				
13	FW	Edílson	December 8, 1978 (aged 25)	cm / kg	15	2				
14	MF	Seiji Koga	August 7, 1979 (aged 24)	cm / kg	33	9				
15	MF	Kenichiro Meta	July 2, 1982 (aged 21)	cm / kg	43	2				
16	GK	Ryuichi Kamiyama	November 10, 1984 (aged 19)	cm / kg	0	0				
17	MF	Kazuyuki Otsuka	July 7, 1982 (aged 21)	cm / kg	5	0				
18	DF	Takahiro Masukawa	November 8, 1979 (aged 24)	cm / kg	43	4				
19	DF	Takashi Hirajima	February 3, 1982 (aged 22)	cm / kg	36	1				
20	MF	Naoyuki Okimoto	June 13, 1984 (aged 19)	cm / kg	0	0				
21	DF	Shigeki Kurata	June 22, 1972 (aged 31)	cm / kg	29	0				
22	MF	Yuki Matsushita	December 7, 1981 (aged 22)	cm / kg	11	0				
23	DF	Toru Miyamoto	December 3, 1982 (aged 21)	cm / kg	16	0				
24	FW	Keisuke Ota	April 24, 1979 (aged 24)	cm / kg	24	5				
25	DF	Kenta Kifuji	October 5, 1981 (aged 22)	cm / kg	0	0				
26	FW	Ryota Arimitsu	April 21, 1981 (aged 22)	cm / kg	19	6				
27	DF	Hisanori Ogawa	May 22, 1984 (aged 19)	cm / kg	0	0				
28	GK	Hideki Tsukamoto	August 9, 1973 (aged 30)	cm / kg	1	0				
29	DF	Hokuto Nakamura	July 10, 1985 (aged 18)	cm / kg	0	0				
30	DF	Tomokazu Nagira	October 17, 1985 (aged 18)	cm / kg	0	0				
31	FW	Keisuke Shuto	October 5, 1984 (aged 19)	cm / kg	0	0				
32	FW	Yūsuke Tanaka	February 3, 1986 (aged 18)	cm / kg	28	1				
33	GK	Tomoaki Ōgami	June 7, 1970 (aged 33)	cm / kg	0	0				
34	MF	Kyohei Yamagata	September 7, 1981 (aged 22)	cm / kg	38	8				

== Other pages ==
- (in Japanese) J. League official site
