= 2009 Avispa Fukuoka season =

Avispa Fukuoka
2009 season
- Manager: Yoshiyuki Shinoda
- Stadium: Level-5 Stadium
- J. League 2: 11th
- Emperor's Cup: 3rd Round
- Top goalscorer: Tetsuya Ōkubo (16)

2009 Avispa Fukuoka season

== Competitions ==
Competitions	Position
J. League 2	11th / 18 clubs
Emperor's Cup	3rd Round

== Player statistics ==
No.	Pos.	Player	D.o.B. (Age)	Height / Weight	J. League 2		Emperor's Cup		Total	
No.	Pos.	Player	D.o.B. (Age)	Height / Weight	Apps	Goals	Apps	Goals	Apps	Goals
1	GK	Ryuichi Kamiyama	November 10, 1984 (aged 24)	cm / kg	0	0				
2	DF	Toru Miyamoto	December 3, 1982 (aged 26)	cm / kg	14	0				
3	DF	Tatsunori Yamagata	October 4, 1983 (aged 25)	cm / kg	45	0				
4	DF	Makoto Tanaka	August 8, 1975 (aged 33)	cm / kg	29	0				
5	DF	Satoshi Nagano	August 2, 1982 (aged 26)	cm / kg	19	0				
6	MF	Wellington	September 4, 1981 (aged 27)	cm / kg	25	0				
7	MF	Kiyokazu Kudo	June 21, 1974 (aged 34)	cm / kg	34	3				
8	MF	Jun Suzuki	April 22, 1989 (aged 19)	cm / kg	39	0				
9	FW	Teruaki Kurobe	March 6, 1978 (aged 31)	cm / kg	32	3				
10	MF	Hisashi Jogo	April 16, 1986 (aged 22)	cm / kg	38	5				
11	FW	Yūsuke Tanaka	February 3, 1986 (aged 23)	cm / kg	40	10				
13	DF	Tomokazu Nagira	October 17, 1985 (aged 23)	cm / kg	35	0				
14	MF	Daisuke Nakaharai	May 22, 1977 (aged 31)	cm / kg	23	0				
15	MF	Alex	March 20, 1985 (aged 23)	cm / kg	5	0				
16	MF	Tatsunori Hisanaga	December 23, 1977 (aged 31)	cm / kg	3	0				
17	DF	Takanori Nakajima	February 9, 1984 (aged 25)	cm / kg	31	0				
18	FW	Yutaka Takahashi	September 29, 1980 (aged 28)	cm / kg	44	8				
19	FW	Tetsuya Ōkubo	March 9, 1980 (aged 28)	cm / kg	48	16				
20	MF	Yuji Miyahara	July 19, 1980 (aged 28)	cm / kg	36	0				
21	FW	Kyohei Oyama	May 22, 1989 (aged 19)	cm / kg	11	0				
22	GK	Motohiro Yoshida	August 25, 1974 (aged 34)	cm / kg	36	0				
23	GK	Yuji Rokutan	April 10, 1987 (aged 21)	cm / kg	15	0				
24	DF	Yasuomi Kugisaki	May 3, 1982 (aged 26)	cm / kg	16	0				
25	GK	Eita Kasagawa	October 25, 1990 (aged 18)	cm / kg	0	0				
26	FW	Hideya Okamoto	May 18, 1987 (aged 21)	cm / kg	35	5				
27	DF	Daiki Niwa	January 16, 1986 (aged 23)	cm / kg	35	1				
28	DF	Kazuki Yamaguchi	October 7, 1986 (aged 22)	cm / kg	1	0				
29	FW	Kensuke Nagai	March 5, 1989 (aged 20)	cm / kg	5	0				
31	MF	Shu Abe	June 7, 1984 (aged 24)	cm / kg	17	0				

== Other pages ==
- (in Japanese) J. League official site
