= Kohei Miyazaki =

Japanese footballer

Kohei Miyazaki 宮崎 光平
Personal information
- Full name: Kohei Miyazaki
- Date of birth: February 6, 1981 (age 45)
- Place of birth: Yamaga, Kumamoto, Japan
- Height: 1.64 m (5 ft 4 1/2 in)
- Position: Midfielder

Youth career
- 1996–1998: Kamoto High School

Senior career*
Years	Team	Apps	(Gls)
1999–2001	Sanfrecce Hiroshima	3	(0)
2002–2007	Avispa Fukuoka	177	(20)
2008–2011	Montedio Yamagata	82	(11)
2012–2014	Tokushima Vortis	61	(5)
Total		323	(36)
Medal record
Sanfrecce Hiroshima
Runner-up	Emperor's Cup	1999
- * Club domestic league appearances and goals

Kohei Miyazaki (宮崎 光平, Miyazaki Kohei; born February 6, 1981) is a former Japanese football player.

== Playing career ==
Miyazaki was born in Yamaga on February 6, 1981. After graduating from high school, he joined J1 League club Sanfrecce Hiroshima in 1999. Although he played several matches in 2001, he could hardly play in the match at the club in 3 seasons. In 2002, he moved to J2 League club Avispa Fukuoka. He played many matches as regular player and the club was promoted to J1 from 2006. Although his opportunity to play decreased from 2006 and the club was relegated to J2 in a year. In 2008, he moved to J2 club Montedio Yamagata. He played many matches and the club was promoted to J1 from 2009. His opportunity to play decreased from 2010 and the club finished at bottom place in 2011 and was relegated to J2 from 2012. In 2012, he moved to J2 club Tokushima Vortis. He played many matches and the club was promoted to J1 from 2014. Although his opportunity to play decreased and the club finished at bottom place in 2014 and was relegated to J2 from 2015. He retired end of 2014 season.

== Career statistics ==
Appearances and goals by club, season and competition
Club	Season	League			Emperor's Cup		J.League Cup		Total	
Club	Season	Division	Apps	Goals	Apps	Goals	Apps	Goals	Apps	Goals
Sanfrecce Hiroshima	1999	J1 League	0	0	0	0	0	0	0	0
Sanfrecce Hiroshima	2000	J1 League	0	0	0	0	0	0	0	0
Sanfrecce Hiroshima	2001	J1 League	3	0	0	0	2	0	5	0
Avispa Fukuoka	2002	J2 League	27	2	3	0	—		30	2
Avispa Fukuoka	2003	J2 League	44	8	3	3	—		47	11
Avispa Fukuoka	2004	J2 League	35	0	2	1	—		37	1
Avispa Fukuoka	2005	J2 League	35	5	0	0	—		35	5
Avispa Fukuoka	2006	J1 League	7	1	1	0	4	1	12	2
Avispa Fukuoka	2007	J2 League	29	4	2	0	—		31	4
Montedio Yamagata	2008	J2 League	38	6	2	1	—		40	7
Montedio Yamagata	2009	J1 League	25	1	1	0	5	0	31	1
Montedio Yamagata	2010	J1 League	6	2	3	1	1	0	10	3
Montedio Yamagata	2011	J1 League	13	2	1	0	—		14	2
Tokushima Vortis	2012	J2 League	24	2	1	0	—		25	2
Tokushima Vortis	2013	J2 League	26	3	1	0	—		27	3
Tokushima Vortis	2014	J1 League	11	0	1	0	5	0	17	0
Career total			323	36	21	6	17	1	361	43
