= Kugisaki =

Kugisaki (Japanese: 釘崎) is a Japanese surname that may refer to the following notable people:

- Nobara Kugisaki, fictional character of the manga series Jujutsu Kaisen
- Yasuomi Kugisaki (born 1982), Japanese football player
