= 2003 Avispa Fukuoka season =

Avispa Fukuoka
2003 season
- Manager: Hiroshi Matsuda
- Stadium: Hakatanomori Football Stadium
- J. League 2: 4th
- Emperor's Cup: 3rd Round
- Top goalscorer: Bentinho (20)
Home colours	Away colours

2003 Avispa Fukuoka season

== Competitions ==
Competitions	Position
J. League 2	4th / 12 clubs
Emperor's Cup	3rd Round

== Domestic results ==
=== J. League 2 ===
Match	Date	Venue	Opponents	Score
1	2003.3.15	Hakata no mori stadium	Mito HollyHock	1-2
2	2003.3.22	Niigata City Athletic Stadium	Albirex Niigata	0-4
3	2003.3.29	Hakata no mori stadium	Kawasaki Frontale	0-2
4	2003.4.5	Tosu Stadium	Sagan Tosu	3-2
5	2003.4.9	Hakata no mori stadium	Yokohama F.C.	3-2
6	2003.4.12	Muroran (ja:室蘭市入江運動公園陸上競技場)	Consadole Sapporo	0-5
7	2003.4.19	Hakata no mori stadium	Omiya Ardija	0-1
8	2003.4.26	Hakata no mori stadium	Montedio Yamagata	2-2
9	2003.4.29	Hiratsuka Athletics Stadium	Shonan Bellmare	2-1
10	2003.5.5	Hakata no mori stadium	Sanfrecce Hiroshima	0-2
11	2003.5.10	Kose Sports Stadium	Ventforet Kofu	1-2
12	2003.5.14	Hitachinaka (ja:ひたちなか市総合運動公園陸上競技場)	Mito HollyHock	1-1
13	2003.5.17	Hakata no mori stadium	Albirex Niigata	1-2
14	2003.5.24	Todoroki Athletics Stadium	Kawasaki Frontale	1-2
15	2003.5.31	Hakata no mori stadium	Sagan Tosu	5-2
16	2003.6.7	Hiroshima Stadium	Sanfrecce Hiroshima	1-3
17	2003.6.14	Hakata no mori stadium	Ventforet Kofu	1-2
18	2003.6.18	Yamagata Park Stadium	Montedio Yamagata	0-0
19	2003.6.21	Ōmiya Park Soccer Stadium	Omiya Ardija	1-2
20	2003.6.28	Hakata no mori stadium	Consadole Sapporo	0-0
21	2003.7.2	Mitsuzawa Stadium	Yokohama F.C.	1-1
22	2003.7.5	Hakata no mori stadium	Shonan Bellmare	2-0
23	2003.7.19	Kose Sports Stadium	Ventforet Kofu	0-0
24	2003.7.26	Niigata Stadium	Albirex Niigata	2-3
25	2003.7.30	Hakata no mori stadium	Mito HollyHock	1-0
26	2003.8.2	Tosu Stadium	Sagan Tosu	2-0
27	2003.8.10	Hakata no mori stadium	Sanfrecce Hiroshima	3-1
28	2003.8.16	Hakata no mori stadium	Omiya Ardija	5-3
29	2003.8.23	Hakodate (ja:函館市千代台公園陸上競技場)	Consadole Sapporo	2-1
30	2003.8.30	Hakata no mori stadium	Yokohama F.C.	1-1
31	2003.9.3	Hakata no mori stadium	Montedio Yamagata	1-0
32	2003.9.6	Hiratsuka Athletics Stadium	Shonan Bellmare	3-0
33	2003.9.13	Hakata no mori stadium	Kawasaki Frontale	2-3
34	2003.9.20	Ōmiya Park Soccer Stadium	Omiya Ardija	1-0
35	2003.9.23	Hakata no mori stadium	Consadole Sapporo	1-0
36	2003.9.27	Hakata no mori stadium	Ventforet Kofu	3-0
37	2003.10.5	Yamagata Park Stadium	Montedio Yamagata	3-3
38	2003.10.13	Hakatanomori Athletic Stadium	Shonan Bellmare	1-0
39	2003.10.18	Hiroshima Big Arch	Sanfrecce Hiroshima	2-0
40	2003.10.25	Mitsuzawa Stadium	Yokohama F.C.	1-0
41	2003.11.1	Hakata no mori stadium	Sagan Tosu	2-1
42	2003.11.8	Todoroki Athletics Stadium	Kawasaki Frontale	2-5
43	2003.11.15	Hakata no mori stadium	Albirex Niigata	2-1
44	2003.11.23	Kasamatsu Stadium	Mito HollyHock	1-0

=== Emperor's Cup ===
Match	Date	Venue	Opponents	Score
1st Round	2003..	[[]]	[[]]	-
2nd Round	2003..	[[]]	[[]]	-
3rd Round	2003..	[[]]	[[]]	-

== Player statistics ==
No.	Pos.	Player	D.o.B. (Age)	Height / Weight	J. League 2		Emperor's Cup		Total	
No.	Pos.	Player	D.o.B. (Age)	Height / Weight	Apps	Goals	Apps	Goals	Apps	Goals
1	GK	Tomoaki Ōgami	June 7, 1970 (aged 32)	cm / kg	0	0				
2	DF	Asuka Tateishi	June 9, 1983 (aged 19)	cm / kg	11	0				
3	DF	Sérgio	September 19, 1975 (aged 27)	cm / kg	28	0				
4	DF	Shinya Kawashima	July 20, 1978 (aged 24)	cm / kg	39	3				
5	DF	Mitsuru Chiyotanda	June 1, 1980 (aged 22)	cm / kg	26	1				
6	MF	Yoshiyuki Shinoda	June 18, 1971 (aged 31)	cm / kg	34	2				
7	MF	Kohei Miyazaki	February 6, 1981 (aged 22)	cm / kg	44	8				
8	MF	Takeo Harada	October 2, 1971 (aged 31)	cm / kg	27	1				
9	DF	Alex	April 16, 1983 (aged 19)	cm / kg	40	2				
10	MF	Yuji Miyahara	July 19, 1980 (aged 22)	cm / kg	34	2				
11	MF	Tatsunori Hisanaga	December 23, 1977 (aged 25)	cm / kg	7	0				
12	GK	Hideki Tsukamoto	August 9, 1973 (aged 29)	cm / kg	21	0				
13	FW	Bentinho	December 18, 1971 (aged 31)	cm / kg	41	20				
14	MF	Seiji Koga	August 7, 1979 (aged 23)	cm / kg	25	5				
15	MF	Yoshifumi Yamada	November 4, 1981 (aged 21)	cm / kg	4	0				
16	GK	Yuichi Mizutani	May 26, 1980 (aged 22)	cm / kg	24	0				
17	MF	Kazuyuki Otsuka	July 7, 1982 (aged 20)	cm / kg	26	0				
18	FW	Tomoji Eguchi	April 22, 1977 (aged 25)	cm / kg	5	1				
19	FW	Hiroyuki Hayashi	October 5, 1983 (aged 19)	cm / kg	31	11				
20	MF	Kenichiro Meta	July 2, 1982 (aged 20)	cm / kg	33	0				
21	DF	Shigeki Kurata	June 22, 1972 (aged 30)	cm / kg	30	0				
22	MF	Kazuhiro Ninomiya	November 23, 1982 (aged 20)	cm / kg	0	0				
23	DF	Toru Miyamoto	December 3, 1982 (aged 20)	cm / kg	14	0				
24	FW	Keisuke Ota	April 24, 1979 (aged 23)	cm / kg	11	2				
25	MF	Masaki Iwamoto	October 30, 1983 (aged 19)	cm / kg	0	0				
26	DF	Takahiro Masukawa	November 8, 1979 (aged 23)	cm / kg	11	0				
27	MF	Naoyuki Okimoto	June 13, 1984 (aged 18)	cm / kg	0	0				
28	DF	Hisanori Ogawa	May 22, 1984 (aged 18)	cm / kg	0	0				
29	FW	Hiroshi Fukushima	July 14, 1982 (aged 20)	cm / kg	30	8				
30	GK	Ryuichi Kamiyama	November 10, 1984 (aged 18)	cm / kg	0	0				
31	FW	Keisuke Shuto	October 5, 1984 (aged 18)	cm / kg	0	0				
32	DF	Takashi Hirajima	February 3, 1982 (aged 21)	cm / kg	11	0				
33	DF	Toshikazu Kato	May 28, 1981 (aged 21)	cm / kg	0	0				
34	MF	Noritomo Harada	July 14, 1984 (aged 18)	cm / kg	0	0				
35	FW	Ryota Arimitsu	April 21, 1981 (aged 21)	cm / kg	0	0				

== Other pages ==
- (in Japanese) J. League official site
