= Alex (footballer, born 1983) =

Brazilian footballer

Personal information
- Full name: Alex Antônio de Melo Santos
- Date of birth: April 16, 1983 (age 43)
- Place of birth: Brazil
- Height: 1.72 m (5 ft 8 in)
- Positions: Left-back; left winger

Youth career
- 1996–2000: Cruzeiro

Senior career*
Years	Team	Apps	(Gls)
2001	Cruzeiro		
2002	Kawasaki Frontale	20	(1)
2003–2007	Avispa Fukuoka	186	(38)
2008	Kashiwa Reysol	28	(5)
2009–2010	JEF United Chiba	55	(7)
2011–2012	Kashima Antlers	35	(1)
2012	→ Tokushima Vortis (loan)	14	(3)
2013–2016	Tokushima Vortis	108	(4)
2017–2018	Kamatamare Sanuki	53	(0)
- * Club domestic league appearances and goals

Alex Antônio de Melo Santos, or simply Alex (born April 16, 1983), is a Brazilian former footballer who played as a left-back and left winger.

== Career ==
In June 2012, Alex joined Tokushima Vortis on loan from Kashima Antlers. The move was later made permanent, with Alex penning a new contract with Tokushima.

== Personal life ==
His twin brother Alan is also a professional footballer who plays for Fujieda MYFC in the Japan Football League.

== Career statistics ==
As of 23 February 2019

Appearances and goals by club, season and competition
Club	Season	League		National cup (Note: Includes Emperor's Cup.)		League cup (Note: Includes J.League Cup.)		Continental		Total	
Club	Season	Apps	Goals	Apps	Goals	Apps	Goals	Apps	Goals	Apps	Goals
Kawasaki Frontale	2002	20	1	3	2	–		–		23	3
Avispa Fukuoka	2003	40	2	3	0	–		–		43	2
Avispa Fukuoka	2004	36	4	2	1	–		–		38	5
Avispa Fukuoka	2005	35	4	0	0	–		–		35	4
Avispa Fukuoka	2006	30	2	0	0	2	1	–		32	3
Avispa Fukuoka	2007	45	26	2	1	–		–		47	27
Kashiwa Reysol	2008	28	5	5	0	4	1	–		37	6
JEF United Chiba	2009	22	0	1	0	3	0	–		26	0
JEF United Chiba	2010	33	7	0	0	–		–		33	7
Kashima Antlers	2011	30	1	2	0	3	0	5	0	35	1
Kashima Antlers	2012	5	0	0	0	2	0	–		7	0
Tokushima Vortis	2012	14	3	2	1	–		–		16	4
Tokushima Vortis	2013	32	1	1	0	–		–		33	1
Tokushima Vortis	2014	33	1	1	0	3	0	–		37	1
Tokushima Vortis	2015	26	1	1	0	–		–		27	1
Tokushima Vortis	2016	17	1	1	0	–		–		18	1
Kamatamare Sanuki	2017	18	0	0	0	–		–		18	0
Kamatamare Sanuki	2018	35	0	0	0	–		–		35	0
Career total		483	59	24	5	17	2	5	0	527	66
