= Millennium Super Soccer Cup =

Sahara Cup

Tournament details
- Host country: India
- Dates: 10–25 January 2001
- Teams: 13 (from 3 confederations)
- Venue: 3 (in 3 host cities)

Final positions
- Champions: FR Yugoslavia
- Runners-up: Bosnia and Herzegovina

Tournament statistics
- Matches played: 22
- Goals scored: 58 (2.64 per match)
- Top scorer(s): (Iceland) Tryggvi Guðmundsson (Japan) Keisuke Ota (Federal Republic of Yugoslavia) Saša Ilić (3 goals each)

The Millennium Super Soccer Cup, known as the Sahara Cup for sponsorship reasons, was an international football tournament held in India from 10 January to 25 January 2001. The FR Yugoslavia were the eventual champions after defeating Bosnia in the final.

== Venues ==
Kolkata	Kochi	Goa
Salt Lake Stadium	Nehru Stadium	Fatorda Stadium
Capacity: 120,000	Capacity: 60,000	Capacity: 35,000

== Teams ==
AFC

- Bahrain
- Bangladesh
- Hong Kong
- India
- ~~Indonesia~~ (withdrew)
- ~~Iraq~~ (withdrew)
- Japan University XI
- Jordan
- Uzbekistan

CAF

- ~~Cameroon~~ (withdrew)

CONMEBOL

- Chile
- Uruguay B

UEFA

- Bosnia and Herzegovina
- Iceland
- Romania XI
- FR Yugoslavia

== Results ==
=== Group stage ===
==== Group I ====
Pos	Team	Pld	W	D	L	GF	GA	GD	Pts	Qualification
1	FR Yugoslavia	2	1	1	0	5	2	+3	4	Advance to knockout stage
2	Bosnia and Herzegovina	2	1	1	0	3	1	+2	4	Advance to knockout stage
3	Bangladesh	2	0	0	2	1	6	–5	0	
4	Iraq	Withdrew on 8 January without citing reasons								

12 January 2001
19:30

Bosnia and Herzegovina	2–0	Bangladesh
Hota 55', 58'	Report

Jawaharlal Nehru Stadium, Kochi
Referee: Vasan Surem (Indonesia)

14 January 2001
17:30

FR Yugoslavia	1–1	Bosnia and Herzegovina
Petković 86'	Report	Bešlija 75'

Jawaharlal Nehru Stadium, Kochi
Referee: Halim Abdul Hamid (Malaysia)

16 January 2001
19:00

FR Yugoslavia	4–1	Bangladesh
Ilić 19', 38'; Rašović 80'; Trobok 89'	Report	Firoj Mahmud 6'

Jawaharlal Nehru Stadium, Kochi
Referee: Michael Andrews (India)

==== Group II ====
Pos	Team	Pld	W	D	L	GF	GA	GD	Pts	Qualification
1	Uruguay B	2	2	0	0	5	1	+4	6	Advance to knockout stage
2	Iceland	2	1	0	1	4	2	+2	3	Advance to knockout stage
3	India	2	0	0	2	0	6	–6	0	
4	Indonesia	Withdrew on 10 January								

11 January 2001
17:30

Uruguay B	2–1	Iceland
Alexandro Umpiérrez 26' (pen.); Ricardo Varela 29'	Report	Þórhallur Hinriksson 31'

Jawaharlal Nehru Stadium, Kochi
Attendance: 2,340
Referee: Halim Abdul Hamid (Malaysia)

13 January 2001
17:00

India	0–3	Iceland
	Report	Guðmundsson 44', 52', 69'

Jawaharlal Nehru Stadium, Kochi
Attendance: 10,000
Referee: Arambekade G. C. Deshapriya (Sri Lanka)

15 January 2001
17:30

India	0–3	Uruguay B
	Report	Juan Selages 38'; Ricardo Varela 58'; Wilson Martirena 74'

Jawaharlal Nehru Stadium, Kochi
Referee: Arambekade G. C. Deshapriya (Sri Lanka)

Deshapriya ( south afrika)

==== Group III ====
Pos	Team	Pld	W	D	L	GF	GA	GD	Pts	Qualification
1	Jordan	2	2	0	0	3	0	+3	6	Advance to knockout stage
2	Romania XI	2	1	0	1	4	3	+1	3	Advance to knockout stage
3	Hong Kong	2	0	0	2	2	6	–4	0	
4	Cameroon	Withdrew on 10 January without citing reasons								

11 January 2001
15:45

Romania XI	0–1	Jordan
	Report	Ibrahim 87'

Fatorda Stadium, Margao
Referee: Bala Sundaraj (India)

14 January 2001
15:30

Romania XI	4–2	Hong Kong
Liviu Zahariuc 4'; Sasu 23'; Sânmărtean 59'; Ioan Luca 63'	Report	Kwok Yue Hung 22', 45'

Fatorda Stadium, Margao
Referee: A. M. Yapa (Sri Lanka)

16 January 2001
17:00

Jordan	2–0	Hong Kong
Al-Shaqran 49'; Al-Shboul 84'	Report

Fatorda Stadium, Margao

==== Group IV ====
Pos	Team	Pld	W	D	L	GF	GA	GD	Pts	Qualification
1	Chile	3	3	0	0	5	0	+5	9	Advance to knockout stage
2	Japan University XI	3	2	0	1	4	1	+3	6	Advance to knockout stage
3	Uzbekistan	3	1	0	2	5	4	+1	3	
4	Bahrain	3	0	0	3	0	9	–9	0	

10 January 2001
15:00

Uzbekistan	0–2	Japan University XI
	Report	Ota 44'; Horinouchi 87'

Salt Lake Stadium, Kolkata
Attendance: 12,500
Referee: S. Saleerajan (Malaysia)

12 January 2001
15:30

Uzbekistan	5–0	Bahrain
Bahadir Annamotov 15', 66'; Aleksei Zhdanov 26' (pen.); Oybek Usmankhodjaev 53', 90'	Report

Salt Lake Stadium, Kolkata
Referee: Binod Kumar Singh (India)

13 January 2001
19:00

Chile	1–0	Japan University XI
Tapia 34'	Report

Salt Lake Stadium, Kolkata

15 January 2001
15:00

Chile	2–0	Bahrain
Tapia 29'; Martel 80'	Report

Salt Lake Stadium, Kolkata
Referee: P. K. Bose (India)

The match was originally scheduled for 10 January, but was later postponed as the Chilean team had trouble with its equipment, which was kept at Johannesburg at the day of the match.

17 January 2001
17:00

Chile	2–0	Uzbekistan
Villaseca 41'; Meléndez 86'	Report

Salt Lake Stadium, Kolkata
Referee: S. Saleerajan (Malaysia)

17 January 2001
19:00

Bahrain	0–2	Japan University XI
	Report	Ota 39'; Hideki Sekine 79'

Salt Lake Stadium, Kolkata
Referee: Binod Kumar Singh (India)

=== Knockout stage ===
==== Bracket ====
Quarter-finals
18 January – Kochi
Uruguay B	2
Bosnia (g.g.)	3
20 January – Kolkata
Chile	2
Iceland	0
20 January – Goa
FR Yugoslavia	2
Romania XI	0
21 January – Kolkata
Jordan	0
Japan University	4

Semi-finals
22 January – Kolkata
Bosnia	1
Chile	0
23 January – Kolkata
FR Yugoslavia	1
Japan University	0

Final
25 January – Kolkata
Bosnia	0
FR Yugoslavia	2

==== Quarter-finals ====
18 January 2001
19:00

Uruguay B	2–3 (a.e.t.)	Bosnia and Herzegovina
Pereira 12'; Juan Segales 59'	Report	Kavazović 40'; Muharemović 83'; Bešlija 97'

Jawaharlal Nehru Stadium, Kochi
Referee: Halim Abdul Hamid (Malaysia)

20 January 2001
16:30

FR Yugoslavia	2–0	Romania
Ilić 30'; Bogdanović 45'	Report

Fatorda Stadium, Margao
Referee: Balu Sundarraj (India)

20 January 2001
18:30

Chile	2–0	Iceland
González 37', 50'	Report

Salt Lake Stadium, Kolkata
Referee: Hassan Marshoud (Jordan)

21 January 2001
17:00

Jordan	0–4	Japan University XI
	Report	Fujita 31'; Ota 54'; Yoshimura 58'; Hideki Sekine 67'

Salt Lake Stadium, Kolkata
Referee: Binod Kumar Singh (India)

==== Semi-finals ====
22 January 2001
17:00

Bosnia and Herzegovina	1–0	Chile
Muharemović 75'	Report

Salt Lake Stadium, Kolkata
Referee: Rungkly Mangkol (Thailand)

23 January 2001
17:00

FR Yugoslavia	1–0	Japan University XI
Duljaj 5'	Report

Salt Lake Stadium, Kolkata
Referee: S. Salerajan (Malaysia)

==== Final ====
25 January 2001
17:00

Bosnia and Herzegovina	0–2	FR Yugoslavia
	Report	Duljaj 6'; Bogdanović 45'

Salt Lake Stadium, Kolkata
Attendance: 40,000
Referee: Rungkly Mangkol (Thailand)

== Statistics ==
=== Goalscorers ===
3 goals

- (Iceland) Tryggvi Guðmundsson
- (Japan) Keisuke Ota
- (Federal Republic of Yugoslavia) Saša Ilić

2 goals

- (Bosnia and Herzegovina) Mirsad Bešlija
- (Bosnia and Herzegovina) Almedin Hota
- (Bosnia and Herzegovina) Dželaludin Muharemović
- (Chile) Sebastián González
- (Chile) Héctor Tapia
- (Hong Kong) Kwok Yue Hung
- (Japan) Hideki Sekine
- (Uruguay) Juan Selages
- (Uruguay) Ricardo Varela
- (Uzbekistan) Bahadir Annamotov
- (Uzbekistan) Oybek Usmankhodjaev
- (Federal Republic of Yugoslavia) Igor Bogdanović
- (Federal Republic of Yugoslavia) Igor Duljaj

1 goal

- (Bangladesh) Firoj Mahmud Titu
- (Bosnia and Herzegovina) Zehrudin Kavazović
- (Chile) Fernando Martel
- (Chile) Rodrigo Meléndez
- (Chile) Marco Villaseca
- (Iceland) Þórhallur Hinriksson
- (Japan) Yoshimasa Fujita
- (Japan) Satoshi Horinouchi
- (Japan) Keiji Yoshimura
- (Jordan) Badran Al-Shaqran
- (Jordan) Haitham Al-Shboul
- (Jordan) Faisal Ibrahim
- (Romania) Ioan Luca
- (Romania) Lucian Sânmărtean
- (Romania) Marius Sasu
- (Romania) Liviu Zahariuc
- (Uruguay) Wilson Martirena
- (Uruguay) Daniel Pereira
- (Uruguay) Alexandro Umpiérrez
- (Uzbekistan) Aleksei Zhdanov
- (Federal Republic of Yugoslavia) Dušan Petković
- (Federal Republic of Yugoslavia) Vuk Rašović
- (Federal Republic of Yugoslavia) Goran Trobok
