= Keisuke Ota =

Keisuke Ota may refer to:

- Keisuke Ota (footballer, born 1979) (太田 恵介), Japanese footballer
- Keisuke Ota (footballer, born 1981) (太田 圭輔), Japanese footballer
- Keisuke Ota (footballer, born 1989) (太田 圭祐), Japanese footballer
