= Erison =

Erison is a given name. It may refer to:

- Erison Carlos dos Santos Silva (born 1980), commonly known as Pingo, Brazilian footballer
- Erison da Silva Santos Carnietto (born 1981), commonly known as Baiano, Brazilian footballer
- Erison Danilo de Souza (born 1999), Brazilian footballer
- Erison Hurtault (born 1984), American sprinter
