= Kenichiro Meta =

Japanese footballer (born 1982)

Kenichiro Meta 米田 兼一郎
Personal information
- Full name: Kenichiro Meta
- Date of birth: July 2, 1982 (age 44)
- Place of birth: Kirishima, Kagoshima, Japan
- Height: 1.77 m (5 ft 9 1/2 in)
- Position: Midfielder

Youth career
- 1998–2000: Kagoshima Josei High School

Senior career*
Years	Team	Apps	(Gls)
2001–2004	Avispa Fukuoka	82	(2)
2005–2007	Kyoto Sanga FC	62	(0)
2007	Tochigi SC	16	(2)
2008–2010	Tokushima Vortis	80	(1)
2011	Sagan Tosu	5	(0)
2012–2013	FC Kagoshima	19	(0)
2016–2018	Tegevajaro Miyazaki	35	(3)
Total		299	(8)
- * Club domestic league appearances and goals

Kenichiro Meta (米田 兼一郎, Meta Kenichirō; born July 2, 1982) is a former Japanese football player.

== Playing career ==
Meta was born in Kirishima on July 2, 1982. After graduating from high school, he joined J1 League club Avispa Fukuoka in 2001. However he could not play at all in the match and Avispa was relegated to J2 League end of 2001 season. He debuted in 2002 and became a regular player as defensive midfielder from 2003. In 2005, he moved to Kyoto Purple Sanga (later Kyoto Sanga FC). Sanga won the champions in 2005 season and was promoted to J1. Although he played as regular player, he lost his position in August and Sanga finished at bottom place in2006 season. In 2007 J2 League, he could not play at all in the match. In July 2007, he moved to Japan Football League (JFL) club Tochigi SC and played many matches. In 2008, he moved to J2 club Tokushima Vortis. He played as regular player until 2009. However he could not play at all in the match in 2010. In 2011, he moved to Sagan Tosu. Although Sagan won the 2nd place in 2011 season and was promoted to J1, he could not play many matches and left the club end of 2011 season. In 2012, he moved to Regional Leagues club FC Kagoshima based in his local. Although he played many matches in 2012, he could not play many matches in 2013 and left the club in May 2013. After 3 years blank, he joined Regional Leagues club Tegevajaro Miyazaki in 2016. Tegevajaro was promoted to JFL from 2018 season. He retired end of 2018 season.

== Club statistics ==
Club performance			League		Cup		League Cup		Total	
Season	Club	League	Apps	Goals	Apps	Goals	Apps	Goals	Apps	Goals
Japan			League		Emperor's Cup		J.League Cup		Total	
2001	Avispa Fukuoka	J1 League	0	0	0	0	0	0	0	0
2002	Avispa Fukuoka	J2 League	6	0	0	0	-		6	0
2003	Avispa Fukuoka	J2 League	33	0	3	0	-		36	0
2004	Avispa Fukuoka	J2 League	43	2	2	0	-		45	2
Total			82	2	5	0	0	0	87	2
2005	Kyoto Purple Sanga	J2 League	43	0	1	0	-		44	0
2006	Kyoto Purple Sanga	J1 League	19	0	0	0	5	2	24	2
2007	Kyoto Sanga FC	J2 League	0	0	0	0	-		0	0
Total			62	0	1	0	5	2	68	2
2007	Tochigi SC	Football League	16	2	2	0	-		18	2
Total			16	2	2	0	-		18	2
2008	Tokushima Vortis	J2 League	42	1	1	0	-		43	1
2009	Tokushima Vortis	J2 League	38	0	1	0	-		39	0
2010	Tokushima Vortis	J2 League	0	0	0	0	-		0	0
Total			80	1	2	0	-		82	1
2011	Sagan Tosu	J2 League	5	0	1	0	-		6	0
Total			5	0	1	0	-		6	0
2012	FC Kagoshima	Regional Leagues	17	0	-		-		17	0
2013	FC Kagoshima	Regional Leagues	2	0	-		-		2	0
Total			19	0	-		-		19	0
2016	Tegevajaro Miyazaki	Regional Leagues	6	0	-		-		6	0
2017	Tegevajaro Miyazaki	Regional Leagues	18	3	-		-		18	3
2018	Tegevajaro Miyazaki	Football League	11	0	2	0	-		13	0
Total			35	3	2	0	-		37	3
Career total			299	8	13	0	5	2	317	10
