= Kazuyuki Otsuka =

Japanese footballer

Kazuyuki Otsuka 大塚 和征
Personal information
- Full name: Kazuyuki Otsuka
- Date of birth: July 7, 1982 (age 44)
- Place of birth: Oguni, Kumamoto, Japan
- Height: 1.64 m (5 ft 4 1/2 in)
- Position: Midfielder

Youth career
- 1998–2000: Kumamoto Kokufu High School

Senior career*
Years	Team	Apps	(Gls)
2001–2007	Avispa Fukuoka	56	(1)
2006	→V-Varen Nagasaki (loan)	5	(0)
2008–2010	V-Varen Nagasaki	56	(3)
Total		117	(4)
- * Club domestic league appearances and goals

Kazuyuki Otsuka (大塚 和征, Otsuka Kazuyuki; born July 7, 1982) is a former Japanese football player.

== Playing career ==
Otsuka was born in Oguni, Kumamoto on July 7, 1982. After graduating from high school, he joined J1 League club Avispa Fukuoka in 2001. However he could not play at all in the match and Avispa was relegated to J2 League end of 2001 season. He debuted in 2002 and played many matches as midfielder until 2003. However he could not play many matches from 2004. Although Avispa won the 2nd place in 2005 season and was promoted to J1 from 2006, he could not play at all in the match in 2006. In October 2006, he moved to Regional Leagues club V-Varen Nagasaki on loan. In 2007, he returned to Avispa which was relegated to J2 from 2007. However he could hardly play in the match. In 2008, he re-joined V-Varen. He played many matches as regular player and V-Varen was promoted to Japan Football League from 2009. He retired end of 2010 season.

== Club statistics ==
Club performance			League		Cup		League Cup		Total	
Season	Club	League	Apps	Goals	Apps	Goals	Apps	Goals	Apps	Goals
Japan			League		Emperor's Cup		J.League Cup		Total	
2001	Avispa Fukuoka	J1 League	0	0	0	0	0	0	0	0
2002	Avispa Fukuoka	J2 League	16	1	4	0	-		20	1
2003	Avispa Fukuoka	J2 League	26	0	0	0	-		26	0
2004	Avispa Fukuoka	J2 League	5	0	1	0	-		6	0
2005	Avispa Fukuoka	J2 League	6	0	1	0	-		7	0
2006	Avispa Fukuoka	J1 League	0	0	0	0	0	0	0	0
2006	V-Varen Nagasaki	Regional Leagues	5	0	0	0	-		5	0
2007	Avispa Fukuoka	J2 League	3	0	0	0	-		3	0
2008	V-Varen Nagasaki	Regional Leagues	16	2	-		-		16	2
2009	V-Varen Nagasaki	Football League	24	1	1	0	-		25	1
2010	V-Varen Nagasaki	Football League	16	0	1	0	-		17	0
Career total			117	4	8	0	0	0	125	4
