= Hiroyuki Hayashi (footballer) =

Japanese footballer

Hiroyuki Hayashi 林 祐征
Personal information
- Full name: Hiroyuki Hayashi
- Date of birth: October 5, 1983 (age 43)
- Place of birth: Komatsushima, Tokushima, Japan
- Height: 1.87 m (6 ft 1 1/2 in)
- Position: Forward

Youth career
- 1999–2001: Komatsushima High School

Senior career*
Years	Team	Apps	(Gls)
2002–2007	Avispa Fukuoka	102	(18)
2006	→V-Varen Nagasaki (loan)	0	(0)
2008–2009	Tokushima Vortis	10	(0)
2010	Tochigi SC	28	(1)
2011–2012	Giravanz Kitakyushu	52	(11)
Total		192	(30)
- * Club domestic league appearances and goals

Hiroyuki Hayashi (林 祐征, Hayashi Hiroyuki; born October 5, 1983) is a Japanese former football player.

== Playing career ==
Hayashi was born in Komatsushima on October 5, 1983. After graduating from high school, he joined the J2 League club Avispa Fukuoka in 2002. He played in the first season and played many matches as forward in 2003. Although he did not play as much in 2004, Avispa was promoted to the J1 League at the end of the 2005 season. In October 2006, he was loaned to the Regional Leagues club V-Varen Nagasaki. In 2007, he returned to Avispa, which was relegated to J2 for the 2007 season and he played in many matches. In 2008, he moved to Tokushima Vortis. Although he played during two seasons, he did not play in many matches. In 2010, he moved to Tochigi SC. He played often, and scored one goal. In 2011, he moved to Giravanz Kitakyushu. He played often and scored many goals in 2011. However, he did not play as much in 2012 and he retired at the end of the 2012 season.

== Club statistics ==
Club performance			League		Cup		League Cup		Total	
Season	Club	League	Apps	Goals	Apps	Goals	Apps	Goals	Apps	Goals
Japan			League		Emperor's Cup		J.League Cup		Total	
2002	Avispa Fukuoka	J2 League	10	2	4	1	-		14	3
2003	Avispa Fukuoka	J2 League	31	11	3	3	-		34	14
2004	Avispa Fukuoka	J2 League	15	1	1	0	-		16	1
2005	Avispa Fukuoka	J2 League	18	2	1	0	-		19	2
2006	Avispa Fukuoka	J1 League	6	0	0	0	3	0	9	0
Total			80	16	9	4	3	0	92	20
2006	V-Varen Nagasaki	Regional Leagues	0	0	0	0	-		0	0
Total			0	0	0	0	-		0	0
2007	Avispa Fukuoka	J2 League	22	2	2	1	-		24	3
Total			22	2	2	1	-		24	3
2008	Tokushima Vortis	J2 League	7	0	0	0	-		7	0
2009	Tokushima Vortis	J2 League	3	0	1	0	-		4	0
Total			10	0	1	0	-		11	0
2010	Tochigi SC	J2 League	28	1	1	0	-		29	1
Total			28	1	1	0	-		29	1
2011	Giravanz Kitakyushu	J2 League	31	9	1	0	-		32	9
2012	Giravanz Kitakyushu	J2 League	21	2	0	0	-		21	2
Total			52	11	1	0	-		53	11
Career total			192	30	14	5	3	0	209	35
