= Prime Minister Katō =

Prime Minister Katō (加藤総理) may refer to one of the following Prime Ministers of Japan:

- Katō Takaaki (1860–1926), Japanese politician and diplomat
- Katō Tomosaburō (1861–1923), Japanese career officer and cabinet minister

== See also ==
- Kato (disambiguation)
- Takaaki
- Tomosaburō
