= Yasuomi =

- Pronunciation: jasɯomi (IPA)
- Gender: Male

Origin
- Origin: Japanese
- Meaning: Different meanings depending on the kanji used

Yasuomi is a masculine Japanese given name.

== Written forms ==
Yasuomi can be written using many different combinations of kanji characters. Here are some examples:

- 靖臣, "peaceful, retainer"
- 康臣, "healthy, retainer"
- 安臣, "tranquil, retainer"
- 保臣, "preserve, retainer"
- 泰臣, "peaceful, retainer"
- 八洲臣, "8, continent, retainer"
- 易臣, "divination, retainer"

The name can also be written in hiragana やすおみ or katakana ヤスオミ.

== Notable people with the name ==
- Yasuomi Kugisaki (釘﨑 康臣; born 1982), Japanese footballer
- Yasuomi Maki (真木 保臣; 1813–1864), Japanese samurai
- Yasuomi Soda (左右田 泰臣; born 1988), Japanese kickboxer
- Yasuomi Umetsu (梅津 泰臣; born 1960), Japanese animator
