= Toru Miyamoto =

Japanese footballer (born 1982)

Toru Miyamoto 宮本 亨
Personal information
- Full name: Toru Miyamoto
- Date of birth: December 3, 1982 (age 43)
- Place of birth: Shimonoseki, Yamaguchi, Japan
- Height: 1.75 m (5 ft 9 in)
- Position: Defender

Youth career
- 1998–2000: Shimonoseki Chuo Technical High School

Senior career*
Years	Team	Apps	(Gls)
2001–2009	Avispa Fukuoka	177	(5)
2009–2010	Tochigi SC	26	(1)
2011–2015	Giravanz Kitakyushu	125	(2)
Total		328	(8)
- * Club domestic league appearances and goals

Toru Miyamoto (宮本 亨, Miyamoto Tōru; born December 3, 1982) is a former Japanese football player.

== Playing career ==
Miyamoto was born in Shimonoseki on December 3, 1982. After graduating from high school, he joined J1 League club Avispa Fukuoka in 2001. On July 7, he debuted as right side back against Nagoya Grampus Eight. However, he could only play this match in 2001 and Avispa was relegated to J2 League. He played many matches from 2003 and he became a regular player as center back in 2005. Avispa was also promoted to J1 end of 2005 season. Although Avispa was relegated to J2 in a year, he played many matches until 2007. However his opportunity to play decreased from 2008. In August 2009, he moved to newly was promoted to J2 club, Tochigi SC. He became a regular center back soon and played all matches except for suspension in 2009 season. However he could not play many matches in 2010 season. In 2011, he moved to Giravanz Kitakyushu. He played as regular player until 2013. However his opportunity to play decreased from 2014 season and he retired end of 2015 season.

== Career statistics ==
Appearances and goals by club, season and competition
Club	Season	League			Emperor's Cup		J.League Cup		Total	
Club	Season	Division	Apps	Goals	Apps	Goals	Apps	Goals	Apps	Goals
Avispa Fukuoka	2001	J1 League	1	0	0	0	0	0	1	0
Avispa Fukuoka	2002	J2 League	5	0	2	0	-		7	0
Avispa Fukuoka	2003	J2 League	14	0	0	0	-		14	0
Avispa Fukuoka	2004	J2 League	16	0	1	0	-		17	0
Avispa Fukuoka	2005	J2 League	36	0	0	0	-		36	0
Avispa Fukuoka	2006	J1 League	20	0	2	0	5	0	27	0
Avispa Fukuoka	2007	J2 League	47	4	2	0	-		49	4
Avispa Fukuoka	2008	J2 League	24	1	1	0	-		25	1
Avispa Fukuoka	2009	J2 League	14	0	0	0	-		14	0
Avispa Fukuoka	Total		177	5	8	0	5	0	190	5
Tochigi SC	2009	J2 League	15	0	1	0	-		16	0
Tochigi SC	2010	J2 League	11	1	0	0	-		11	1
Tochigi SC	Total		26	1	1	0	-		27	1
Giravanz Kitakyushu	2011	J2 League	36	1	1	0	-		37	1
Giravanz Kitakyushu	2012	J2 League	33	0	0	0	-		33	0
Giravanz Kitakyushu	2013	J2 League	39	0	0	0	-		39	0
Giravanz Kitakyushu	2014	J2 League	11	0	2	0	-		13	0
Giravanz Kitakyushu	2015	J2 League	6	1	1	0	-		7	1
Giravanz Kitakyushu	Total		125	2	4	0	-		129	2
Career total			328	8	13	0	5	0	346	8
