= 2002 Avispa Fukuoka season =

Avispa Fukuoka
2002 season
- Manager: Masataka Imai; Tatsuya Mochizuki; Shigekazu Nakamura
- Stadium: Hakatanomori Football Stadium
- J. League 2: 8th
- Emperor's Cup: 4th Round
- Top goalscorer: Tomoji Eguchi (10); Alen (10)
Home colours	Away colours

2002 Avispa Fukuoka season

== Competitions ==
Competitions	Position
J. League 2	8th / 12 clubs
Emperor's Cup	4th Round

== Domestic results ==
=== J. League 2 ===
Match	Date	Venue	Opponents	Score
1	2002.3.3	Hakata no mori stadium	Oita Trinita	1-2
2	2002.3.9	Kose Sports Stadium	Ventforet Kofu	2-0
3	2002.3.16	Hakata no mori stadium	Kawasaki Frontale	4-0
4	2002.3.21	Hakata no mori stadium	Yokohama F.C.	1-1
5	2002.3.24	Ōmiya Park Soccer Stadium	Omiya Ardija	0-2
6	2002.3.30	Hakata no mori stadium	Shonan Bellmare	1-1
7	2002.4.6	Niigata Stadium	Albirex Niigata	1-0
8	2002.4.10	Hakata no mori stadium	Montedio Yamagata	2-2
9	2002.4.13	Nagai Aid Stadium	Cerezo Osaka	2-1
10	2002.4.20	Hakata no mori stadium	Mito HollyHock	4-0
11	2002.4.24	Tosu Stadium	Sagan Tosu	1-1
12	2002.4.27	Hakata no mori stadium	Ventforet Kofu	1-1
13	2002.5.3	Mitsuzawa Stadium	Yokohama F.C.	0-1
14	2002.5.6	Hakata no mori stadium	Omiya Ardija	1-0
15	2002.5.12	Hiratsuka Athletics Stadium	Shonan Bellmare	0-1
16	2002.7.6	Hakata no mori stadium	Albirex Niigata	0-1
17	2002.7.10	Yamagata Park Stadium	Montedio Yamagata	1-1
18	2002.7.13	Hakata no mori stadium	Sagan Tosu	2-0
19	2002.7.20	Ōita Stadium	Oita Trinita	0-0
20	2002.7.24	Hakata no mori stadium	Cerezo Osaka	3-5
21	2002.7.27	Hitachinaka (ja:ひたちなか市総合運動公園陸上競技場)	Mito HollyHock	3-5
22	2002.8.1	Todoroki Athletics Stadium	Kawasaki Frontale	1-2
23	2002.8.7	Hakata no mori stadium	Shonan Bellmare	3-0
24	2002.8.10	Tosu Stadium	Sagan Tosu	0-1
25	2002.8.17	Hakata no mori stadium	Montedio Yamagata	0-0
26	2002.8.21	Nagai Aid Stadium	Cerezo Osaka	0-1
27	2002.8.25	Kose Sports Stadium	Ventforet Kofu	0-3
28	2002.9.3	Hakata no mori stadium	Oita Trinita	1-2
29	2002.9.7	Niigata Stadium	Albirex Niigata	2-2
30	2002.9.11	Hakata no mori stadium	Mito HollyHock	2-1
31	2002.9.14	Hakata no mori stadium	Yokohama F.C.	1-2
32	2002.9.21	Urawa Komaba Stadium	Omiya Ardija	1-1
33	2002.9.25	Hakata no mori stadium	Kawasaki Frontale	1-2
34	2002.9.28	Hiratsuka Athletics Stadium	Shonan Bellmare	0-2
35	2002.10.5	Honjō Athletic Stadium	Cerezo Osaka	2-4
36	2002.10.9	Kasamatsu Stadium	Mito HollyHock	2-3
37	2002.10.12	Mitsuzawa Stadium	Yokohama F.C.	2-3
38	2002.10.19	Hakata no mori stadium	Ventforet Kofu	1-4
39	2002.10.23	Todoroki Athletics Stadium	Kawasaki Frontale	3-4
40	2002.10.26	Hakata no mori stadium	Omiya Ardija	2-1
41	2002.11.2	Hakata no mori stadium	Albirex Niigata	2-2
42	2002.11.9	Yamagata Park Stadium	Montedio Yamagata	0-1
43	2002.11.16	Hakata no mori stadium	Sagan Tosu	1-1
44	2002.11.24	Ōita Stadium	Oita Trinita	1-2

=== Emperor's Cup ===
Match	Date	Venue	Opponents	Score
1st Round	2002..	[[]]	[[]]	-
2nd Round	2002..	[[]]	[[]]	-
3rd Round	2002..	[[]]	[[]]	-
4th Round	2002..	[[]]	[[]]	-

== Player statistics ==
No.	Pos.	Player	D.o.B. (Age)	Height / Weight	J. League 2		Emperor's Cup		Total	
No.	Pos.	Player	D.o.B. (Age)	Height / Weight	Apps	Goals	Apps	Goals	Apps	Goals
1	GK	Tomoaki Ōgami	June 7, 1970 (aged 31)	cm / kg	38	0				
2	DF	Shinichi Kawaguchi	June 13, 1977 (aged 24)	cm / kg	2	0				
3	DF	Yoshitaka Fujisaki	May 16, 1975 (aged 26)	cm / kg	11	0				
4	DF	Mitsuaki Kojima	July 14, 1968 (aged 33)	cm / kg	31	0				
5	DF	Naruyuki Naito	November 9, 1967 (aged 34)	cm / kg	27	1				
6	MF	Yoshiyuki Shinoda	June 18, 1971 (aged 30)	cm / kg	43	5				
7	MF	Satoru Noda	March 19, 1969 (aged 32)	cm / kg	16	0				
8	FW	Hiroki Hattori	August 30, 1971 (aged 30)	cm / kg	20	4				
9	FW	Wagner Lopes	January 29, 1969 (aged 33)	cm / kg	19	6				
10	MF	Noh Jung-Yoon	March 28, 1971 (aged 30)	cm / kg	33	5				
11	MF	David Bisconti	September 22, 1968 (aged 33)	cm / kg	15	4				
12	GK	Hideki Tsukamoto	August 9, 1973 (aged 28)	cm / kg	7	0				
13	MF	Takeshi Ushibana	September 21, 1977 (aged 24)	cm / kg	16	1				
14	MF	Seiji Koga	August 7, 1979 (aged 22)	cm / kg	17	1				
15	DF	Kazuhisa Iijima	January 6, 1970 (aged 32)	cm / kg	34	1				
16	MF	Yoshifumi Yamada	November 4, 1981 (aged 20)	cm / kg	9	0				
17	MF	Kohei Miyazaki	February 6, 1981 (aged 21)	cm / kg	27	2				
18	FW	Tomoji Eguchi	April 22, 1977 (aged 24)	cm / kg	30	10				
19	GK	Go Kaburaki	August 26, 1977 (aged 24)	cm / kg	0	0				
20	MF	Daisuke Nitta	May 11, 1980 (aged 21)	cm / kg	1	0				
21	DF	Shigeki Kurata	June 22, 1972 (aged 29)	cm / kg	27	1				
22	DF	Toshikazu Kato	May 28, 1981 (aged 20)	cm / kg	8	0				
23	MF	Kenichiro Meta	July 2, 1982 (aged 19)	cm / kg	6	0				
24	FW	Keisuke Ota	April 24, 1979 (aged 22)	cm / kg	4	1				
25	DF	Toru Miyamoto	December 3, 1982 (aged 19)	cm / kg	5	0				
26	MF	Koichiro Nagatomo	December 7, 1982 (aged 19)	cm / kg	2	0				
27	MF	Kazuhiro Ninomiya	November 23, 1982 (aged 19)	cm / kg	0	0				
28	MF	Kazuyuki Otsuka	July 7, 1982 (aged 19)	cm / kg	16	1				
29	FW	Hiroshi Fukushima	July 14, 1982 (aged 19)	cm / kg	8	0				
30	GK	Tsutomu Fujihara	October 13, 1980 (aged 21)	cm / kg	0	0				
31	DF	Asuka Tateishi	June 9, 1983 (aged 18)	cm / kg	7	0				
32	FW	Hiroyuki Hayashi	October 5, 1983 (aged 18)	cm / kg	10	2				
33	MF	Takeo Harada	October 2, 1971 (aged 30)	cm / kg	22	0				
34	FW	Yu Kawamura	December 1, 1980 (aged 21)	cm / kg	8	1				
35	MF	Masaki Iwamoto	October 30, 1983 (aged 18)	cm / kg	0	0				
36	MF	Yuji Miyahara	July 19, 1980 (aged 21)	cm / kg	14	0				
37	DF	Zoltan Sabo	May 26, 1972 (aged 29)	cm / kg	17	1				
38	FW	Alen Avdić	April 3, 1977 (aged 24)	cm / kg	24	10				
39	MF	Hiroki Mihara	April 20, 1978 (aged 23)	cm / kg	14	1				
40	DF	Shinya Kawashima	July 20, 1978 (aged 23)	cm / kg	14	0				

== Other pages ==
- (in Japanese) J. League official site
