= 2006 J.League Division 1 =

14th season of J1 League

J.League Division 1
- Season: 2006
- Champions: Urawa Red Diamonds; 1st J.League title 5th Japanese title
- Relegated: Avispa Fukuoka; Cerezo Osaka; Kyoto Purple Sanga
- Champions League: Urawa Red Diamonds; Kawasaki Frontale (all to the group stage)
- Matches: 306
- Goals: 976 (3.19 per match)
- Top goalscorer: Magno Alves & Washington (26)
- Highest attendance: 62,241 (Round 34, Reds vs. Gamba)
- Lowest attendance: 3,671 (Round 6, Sanga vs. Avispa)
- Average attendance: 18,292

The 2006 J.League Division 1 season was the 14th season since the establishment of the J.League Division 1. It began on March 4 and ended on December 2.

== General ==
=== Promotion/relegation ===
- At the end of the 2005 season, Kyoto Purple Sanga, Avispa Fukuoka, and Ventforet Kofu were promoted to J1.
- At the end of the 2005 season, Kashiwa Reysol, Tokyo Verdy 1969, and Vissel Kobe were relegated to J2.
- At the end of the 2005 season, Ehime FC was promoted to J2.

=== Changes in competition format ===
- The Division 2 was expanded to 13 clubs.
- In games that require extra time in case of a tie (i.e. two-legged league cup games) away goals rule is adopted.

=== Changes in clubs ===
none

== Honours ==
Competition	Champion	Runner-up	3rd place
J.League Division 1	Urawa Red Diamonds	Kawasaki Frontale	Gamba Osaka
J.League Division 2	Yokohama FC	Kashiwa Reysol	Vissel Kobe
Emperor's Cup	Urawa Red Diamonds	Gamba Osaka	Kashima Antlers; Consadole Sapporo
Nabisco Cup	JEF United Ichihara Chiba	Kashima Antlers	Kawasaki Frontale; Yokohama F. Marinos
XEROX Super Cup	Urawa Red Diamonds	Gamba Osaka	

== Clubs ==
Location of the clubs in Japan

The following eighteen clubs participated in J.League Division 1 during 2006 season. Of these clubs, Kyoto Purple Sanga, Avispa Fukuoka, and Ventforet Kofu were newly promoted clubs.

- Albirex Niigata
- Avispa Fukuoka
- Cerezo Osaka
- FC Tokyo
- Gamba Osaka
- JEF United Ichihara Chiba
- Júbilo Iwata
- Kashima Antlers
- Kawasaki Frontale
- Kyoto Purple Sanga
- Nagoya Grampus Eight
- Oita Trinita
- Omiya Ardija
- Sanfrecce Hiroshima
- Shimizu S-Pulse
- Urawa Red Diamonds
- Ventforet Kofu
- Yokohama F. Marinos

=== Personnel ===
Club	Head coach	Kit manufacturer	Shirt sponsor
Albirex Niigata	(Japan) Jun Suzuki	Adidas	Kameda Seika
Avispa Fukuoka	(Japan) Ryoichi Kawakatsu	Mizuno	Georgia
Cerezo Osaka	(Japan) Yuji Tsukada	Mizuno	Yanmar
FC Tokyo	(Japan) Hisao Kuramata	Adidas	Eneos
Gamba Osaka	(Japan) Akira Nishino	Umbro	Panasonic
JEF United Ichihara Chiba	(Bosnia and Herzegovina) Amar Osim	Mizuno	Autowave Co.
Júbilo Iwata	(Brazil) Adilson Batista	Puma	Iida Sangyo
Kashima Antlers	(Brazil) Paulo Autuori	Nike	Tostem
Kawasaki Frontale	(Japan) Takashi Sekizuka	Asics	Fujitsu
Kyoto Purple Sanga	(Japan) Naohiko Minobe	Mizuno	Kyocera
Nagoya Grampus Eight	(Netherlands) Sef Vergoossen	Le Coq Sportif	Toyota
Oita Trinita	(Brazil) Péricles Chamusca	Puma	Maruhan
Omiya Ardija	(Japan) Toshiya Miura	Mizuno	Flet's
Sanfrecce Hiroshima	(Serbia) Mihailo Petrović	Mizuno	Deodeo
Shimizu S-Pulse	(Japan) Kenta Hasegawa	Puma	Japan Airlines
Urawa Red Diamonds	(Germany) Guido Buchwald	Nike	Vodafone
Ventforet Kofu	(Japan) Takeshi Oki	Dell'Erba	Hakubaku
Yokohama F. Marinos	(Japan) Takashi Mizunuma	Adidas	Nissan

=== Foreign players ===
Club	Player 1	Player 2	Player 3	Non-visa foreign	Type-C contract	Former players
Albirex Niigata	(Brazil) Edmílson	(Brazil) Fabinho Santos	(Brazil) Silvinho			
Avispa Fukuoka	(Brazil) Alex	(Brazil) Baron	(Brazil) Roberto		(Brazil) Alexandre	(Brazil) Gláucio
Cerezo Osaka	(Brazil) Bruno Quadros	(Brazil) Pingo	(Brazil) Zé Carlos		(Brazil) Japa	(Brazil) André Neitzke
FC Tokyo	(Brazil) Jean	(Brazil) Lucas Severino	(Brazil) Washington		(Brazil) Rychely	(Paraguay) Santiago Salcedo
Gamba Osaka	(Brazil) Fernandinho	(Brazil) Magno Alves	(Brazil) Sidiclei		(Brazil) Lucas Chiaretti	
JEF United Ichihara Chiba	(Austria) Mario Haas	(Bulgaria) Ilian Stoyanov	(Serbia) Nebojša Krupniković	(South Korea) Kim Dong-soo		
Júbilo Iwata	(Brazil) Fabrício	(South Korea) Kim Jin-kyu				
Kashima Antlers	(Brazil) Alex Mineiro	(Brazil) Fábio Santos	(Brazil) Fernando		(Brazil) Chumbinho	
Kawasaki Frontale	(Brazil) Juninho	(Brazil) Magnum	(Brazil) Marcão	(North Korea) Jong Tae-se		(Brazil) Marcus Vinícius
Kyoto Purple Sanga	(Brazil) André Pinto	(Brazil) Paulinho	(Brazil) Pinheiro		(Brazil) Diego	(Brazil) Alemão (Brazil) Ricardo
Nagoya Grampus Eight	(Norway) Frode Johnsen	(Slovakia) Marek Špilár	(South Korea) Kim Jung-woo			
Oita Trinita	(Brazil) Edmilson Alves	(Brazil) Rafael	(Brazil) Túlio		(Brazil) Platini	(Brazil) Osmar
Omiya Ardija	(Brazil) Alison	(Brazil) Toninho				(Brazil) Rodrigo Gral (Honduras) Saúl Martínez
Sanfrecce Hiroshima	(Brazil) Beto	(Brazil) Ueslei	(Croatia) Dario Dabac	(North Korea) Ri Han-jae	(South Korea) Jo Woo-jin	(Brazil) Dininho
Shimizu S-Pulse	(Brazil) Alexandre Goulart	(Brazil) Marquinhos	(South Korea) Cho Jae-jin			
Urawa Red Diamonds	(Brazil) Nenê	(Brazil) Robson Ponte	(Brazil) Washington	(Spain) Sergio Escudero		
Ventforet Kofu	(Brazil) Alair	(Brazil) Baré	(Brazil) Biju		(Brazil) Josimar (Brazil) Neto	
Yokohama F. Marinos	(Brazil) Dutra	(Brazil) Marques				(Brazil) Magrão

== Format ==
Eighteen clubs will play in double round-robin (home and away) format, a total of 34 games each. A club receives 3 points for a win, 1 point for a tie, and 0 points for a loss. The clubs are ranked by points, and tie breakers are, in the following order:

- Goal differential
- Goals scored
- Head-to-head results

A draw would be conducted, if necessary. However, if two clubs are tied at the first place, both clubs will be declared as the champions. The bottom two clubs will be relegated to J2, while the 16th placed club plays a two-legged Promotion/relegation Series.

Changes from previous year

none

== Table ==
Pos	Team	Pld	W	D	L	GF	GA	GD	Pts	Qualification or relegation
1	Urawa Red Diamonds (C)	34	22	6	6	67	28	+39	72	Qualification for 2007 AFC Champions League Group stage (Note: Urawa Red Diamonds won the 2005 Emperor's Cup and already qualified for 2007 ACL; therefore Kawasaki Frontale takes the second ACL spot.)
2	Kawasaki Frontale	34	20	7	7	84	55	+29	67	Qualification for 2007 AFC Champions League Group stage
3	Gamba Osaka	34	20	6	8	80	48	+32	66	
4	Shimizu S-Pulse	34	18	6	10	60	41	+19	60	
5	Júbilo Iwata	34	17	7	10	68	51	+17	58	
6	Kashima Antlers	34	18	4	12	62	53	+9	58	
7	Nagoya Grampus Eight	34	13	9	12	51	49	+2	48	
8	Oita Trinita	34	13	8	13	47	45	+2	47	
9	Yokohama F. Marinos	34	13	6	15	49	43	+6	45	
10	Sanfrecce Hiroshima	34	13	6	15	50	56	−6	45	
11	JEF United Ichihara Chiba	34	13	5	16	57	58	−1	44	
12	Omiya Ardija	34	13	5	16	43	55	−12	44	
13	FC Tokyo	34	13	4	17	56	65	−9	43	
14	Albirex Niigata	34	12	6	16	46	65	−19	42	
15	Ventforet Kofu	34	12	6	16	42	64	−22	42	
16	Avispa Fukuoka (R)	34	5	12	17	32	56	−24	27	2006 promotion/relegation Series
17	Cerezo Osaka (R)	34	6	9	19	44	70	−26	27	Relegation to 2007 J.League Division 2
18	Kyoto Purple Sanga (R)	34	4	10	20	38	74	−36	22	Relegation to 2007 J.League Division 2

Updated to match(es) played on December 2, 2006. Source: J. League Division 1
Rules for classification: 1) points; 2) goal difference; 3) number of goals scored.
(C) Champions; (R) Relegated

== Results ==
Home \ Away	ALB	ANT	ARD	AVI	CER	FRO	GAM	GRA	JEF	JÚB	SAN	SFR	SSP	TOK	TRI	RED	VEN	FMA
Albirex Niigata		0–1	1–2	0–1	2–2	2–1	1–0	2–1	1–2	0–2	1–1	1–1	4–2	2–0	3–3	2–1	3–0	1–0
Kashima Antlers	5–1		2–1	4–1	2–0	2–4	3–1	2–1	0–4	3–0	1–0	0–2	3–1	3–2	0–1	2–2	3–1	0–3
Omiya Ardija	1–2	0–3		2–2	2–0	1–5	0–2	1–4	4–2	2–1	1–0	0–1	1–0	0–1	2–2	0–2	3–1	2–1
Avispa Fukuoka	2–0	2–1	1–1		1–0	1–2	1–1	0–1	1–3	2–1	4–5	0–2	1–2	0–0	0–2	0–1	1–1	1–3
Cerezo Osaka	3–1	2–2	0–1	0–0		1–3	1–6	1–1	3–2	2–3	2–2	4–2	1–1	1–5	0–2	1–2	2–3	2–0
Kawasaki Frontale	6–0	3–2	3–1	2–1	1–0		3–2	4–2	2–2	3–4	2–0	3–3	2–2	2–2	2–1	0–2	2–0	1–1
Gamba Osaka	3–0	1–0	3–1	2–2	3–1	4–0		5–1	1–0	2–2	3–2	3–2	3–0	1–0	1–3	1–1	2–0	1–1
Nagoya Grampus Eight	3–1	0–0	2–0	2–0	3–2	0–2	3–3		2–1	3–1	1–1	2–3	1–1	1–2	0–3	1–0	5–1	1–1
JEF United Ichihara Chiba	1–3	0–1	1–3	2–2	2–1	1–2	1–2	2–3		0–0	2–0	0–1	1–3	3–4	2–1	2–0	2–2	0–2
Júbilo Iwata	7–0	3–3	2–1	1–1	3–1	1–2	3–2	2–2	3–1		1–1	3–0	1–0	4–1	2–3	3–2	2–0	3–1
Kyoto Purple Sanga	1–1	1–2	1–1	2–1	4–4	2–7	1–4	0–1	1–2	1–3		2–2	2–1	1–0	1–1	1–5	1–1	0–4
Sanfrecce Hiroshima	2–1	3–4	1–0	1–0	1–1	1–3	1–3	0–0	2–4	2–1	1–0		1–2	5–2	0–1	1–4	1–3	3–0
Shimizu S-Pulse	1–1	1–2	1–1	4–0	1–0	4–3	2–3	2–0	1–2	2–0	1–0	3–0		2–0	4–1	2–1	4–0	1–0
FC Tokyo	1–4	2–4	1–2	5–1	2–3	5–4	3–2	2–1	2–3	3–1	2–1	0–2	0–1		2–0	0–0	1–3	1–2
Oita Trinita	4–0	2–0	1–2	0–0	1–1	1–1	0–2	0–1	0–3	1–2	2–1	1–1	3–3	0–1		2–1	3–2	1–2
Urawa Red Diamonds	3–1	4–0	2–0	2–1	3–0	2–2	3–2	0–0	2–0	3–1	3–0	2–1	1–0	4–0	1–0		3–0	1–0
Ventforet Kofu	0–4	2–1	3–2	1–1	0–1	1–0	3–2	2–1	2–3	1–1	3–1	1–0	0–2	1–3	2–0	1–1		1–0
Yokohama F. Marinos	2–0	2–1	1–2	0–0	3–1	1–2	3–4	2–1	1–1	0–1	4–1	2–1	2–3	1–1	0–1	1–3	3–0	

Updated to match(es) played on December 2, 2006. Source: J. League Division 1
Legend: Blue = home team win; Yellow = draw; Red = away team win.

== Top scorers ==
Pos	Scorer	Club	Goals
1	(Brazil) Magno Alves	Gamba Osaka	26
1	(Brazil) Washington	Urawa Red Diamonds	26
3	(Brazil) Juninho	Kawasaki Frontale	20
4	(Brazil) Lucas Severino	FC Tokyo	18
4	(Japan) Hisato Satō	Sanfrecce Hiroshima	18
4	(Japan) Kazuki Ganaha	Kawasaki Frontale	18
7	(Brazil) Ueslei	Sanfrecce Hiroshima	16
7	(Japan) Ryūji Bando	Gamba Osaka	16
7	(South Korea) Cho Jae-jin	Shimizu S-Pulse	16
10	(Japan) Ryoichi Maeda	Júbilo Iwata	15

== Attendance ==
Pos	Team	Total	High	Low	Average	Change
1	Urawa Red Diamonds	774,749	62,241	16,040	45,573	+15.8%
2	Albirex Niigata	658,050	42,056	33,993	38,709	−3.5%
3	FC Tokyo	409,634	41,528	17,033	24,096	−11.1%
4	Yokohama F. Marinos	402,270	50,572	11,623	23,663	−8.0%
5	Oita Trinita	345,955	28,690	12,843	20,350	−7.8%
6	Júbilo Iwata	306,033	37,711	10,560	18,002	+4.1%
7	Gamba Osaka	276,395	20,916	8,388	16,259	+1.8%
8	Kashima Antlers	262,365	34,236	7,427	15,433	−17.2%
9	Nagoya Grampus Eight	253,702	32,109	6,618	14,924	+12.3%
10	Kawasaki Frontale	243,780	23,005	9,430	14,340	+5.0%
11	Shimizu S-Pulse	243,137	24,920	9,079	14,302	+12.2%
12	Avispa Fukuoka	234,259	21,545	8,585	13,780	+27.8%^{†}
13	JEF United Ichihara Chiba	227,680	17,438	8,567	13,393	+40.5%
14	Cerezo Osaka	221,438	30,561	6,282	13,026	−26.2%
15	Ventforet Kofu	207,629	17,000	8,025	12,213	+76.2%^{†}
16	Sanfrecce Hiroshima	190,066	17,564	5,545	11,180	−10.8%
17	Omiya Ardija	173,986	35,059	4,873	10,234	+2.5%
18	Kyoto Purple Sanga	166,280	16,492	3,670	9,781	+24.5%^{†}
	League total	5,597,408	62,241	3,670	18,292	−2.5%

Updated to games played on December 2, 2006
Source: J. League Division 1
Notes:
^{†} Team played previous season in J2.

== Awards ==
=== Individual ===
Award	Recipient	Club
Player of the Year	(Japan) Marcus Tulio Tanaka	Urawa Red Diamonds
Young Player of the Year	(Japan) Jungo Fujimoto	Shimizu S-Pulse
Manager of the Year	(Germany) Guido Buchwald	Urawa Red Diamonds
Top Scorer	(Brazil) Magno Alves	Gamba Osaka
Top Scorer	(Brazil) Washington	Urawa Red Diamonds
Fair Play Player Award	(Japan) Satoru Yamagishi	JEF United Ichihara Chiba
Fair Play Player Award	(Japan) Yuichi Nemoto	Oita Trinita
Referee of the Year	(Japan) Toru Kamikawa	
Assistant Referee of the Year	(Japan) Yoshikazu Hiroshima	
Meritoriousness Player Award	(Japan) Masaaki Sawanobori	
Meritoriousness Player Award	(Japan) Naoki Soma	
Meritoriousness Player Award	(Japan) Nobuyuki Kojima	

=== Best Eleven ===
Position	Footballer	Club	Nationality
GK	Yoshikatsu Kawaguchi (1)	Júbilo Iwata	Japan
DF	Satoshi Yamaguchi (1)	Gamba Osaka	Japan
DF	Marcus Tulio Tanaka (3)	Urawa Red Diamonds	Japan
DF	Hiroyuki Taniguchi (1)	Kawasaki Frontale	Japan
MF	Keita Suzuki (1)	Urawa Red Diamonds	Japan
MF	Yuki Abe (2)	JEF United Ichihara Chiba	Japan
MF	Akira Kaji (1)	Gamba Osaka	Japan
MF	Kengo Nakamura (1)	Kawasaki Frontale	Japan
MF	Yasuhito Endō (4)	Gamba Osaka	Japan
MF	Magno Alves (1)	Gamba Osaka	Brazil
FW	Washington (1)	Urawa Red Diamonds	Brazil

* The number in brackets denotes the number of times that the footballer has appeared in the Best 11.
