= Hiroshi Fukushima =

Japanese footballer

Hiroshi Fukushima 福嶋 洋
Personal information
- Full name: Hiroshi Fukushima
- Date of birth: July 14, 1982 (age 44)
- Place of birth: Nagoya, Aichi, Japan
- Height: 1.82 m (5 ft 11 1/2 in)
- Position: Forward

Youth career
- 1998–2000: Komaba High School

Senior career*
Years	Team	Apps	(Gls)
2001–2005	Avispa Fukuoka	59	(9)
2005–2006	Rosso Kumamoto	23	(5)
2007–2010	V-Varen Nagasaki	62	(37)
2011	Kamatamare Sanuki	23	(8)
Total		167	(59)
- * Club domestic league appearances and goals

Hiroshi Fukushima (福嶋 洋, Fukushima Hiroshi; born July 14, 1982) is a former Japanese football player.

== Playing career ==
Fukushima was born in Nagoya on July 14, 1982. After graduating from high school, he joined the J1 League club Avispa Fukuoka in 2001. However he did not play in anygames and Avispa was relegated to the J2 League at the end of the 2001 season. He debuted in 2002 and played often as forward in 2003. However he did not play as much in 2004. In October 2005, he moved to the Regional Leagues club Rosso Kumamoto. Rosso was promoted to the Japan Football League (JFL) in 2006 and he played more often. In 2007, he moved to the Regional Leagues' V-Varen Nagasaki. In 2008, he scored 25 goals in 18 matches and V-Varen was promoted to the JFL in 2009. In 2011, he moved to the JFL club Kamatamare Sanuki. He retired at the end of the 2011 season.

== Club statistics ==
Club performance			League		Cup		League Cup		Total	
Season	Club	League	Apps	Goals	Apps	Goals	Apps	Goals	Apps	Goals
Japan			League		Emperor's Cup		J.League Cup		Total	
2001	Avispa Fukuoka	J1 League	0	0	0	0	0	0	0	0
2002	Avispa Fukuoka	J2 League	8	0	1	0	-		9	0
2003	Avispa Fukuoka	J2 League	30	8	1	0	-		31	8
2004	Avispa Fukuoka	J2 League	19	1	0	0	-		19	1
2005	Avispa Fukuoka	J2 League	2	0	1	0	-		3	0
2005	Rosso Kumamoto	Regional Leagues	0	0	0	0	-		0	0
2006	Rosso Kumamoto	Football League	23	5	3	4	-		26	9
2007	V-Varen Nagasaki	Regional Leagues	7	4	2	0	-		9	4
2008	V-Varen Nagasaki	Regional Leagues	18	25	-		-		18	25
2009	V-Varen Nagasaki	Football League	21	6	2	0	-		23	6
2010	V-Varen Nagasaki	Football League	16	2	1	0	-		17	2
2011	Kamatamare Sanuki	Football League	23	8	1	0	-		24	8
Career total			167	59	12	4	0	0	179	63
