= Yuji Miyahara =

Japanese footballer

Yuji Miyahara 宮原 裕司
Personal information
- Full name: Yuji Miyahara
- Date of birth: July 19, 1980 (age 46)
- Place of birth: Kitakyushu, Japan
- Height: 1.80 m (5 ft 11 in)
- Position: Midfielder

Youth career
- 1996–1998: Higashi Fukuoka High School

Senior career*
Years	Team	Apps	(Gls)
1999–2002	Nagoya Grampus Eight	2	(0)
2002–2004	Avispa Fukuoka	48	(2)
2005–2007	Sagan Tosu	44	(2)
2005–2006	→Cerezo Osaka (loan)	12	(0)
2007–2008	Ehime FC	47	(2)
2009	Avispa Fukuoka	36	(0)
Total		189	(6)
Medal record
Nagoya Grampus Eight
Winner	Emperor's Cup	1999
- * Club domestic league appearances and goals

Yuji Miyahara (宮原 裕司, Miyahara Yuji; born July 19, 1980) is a former Japanese football player.

== Playing career ==
Miyahara was born in Kitakyushu on July 19, 1980. After graduating from high school, he joined J1 League club Nagoya Grampus Eight in 1999. Although he debuted in 2000, he could hardly play in the match and left the club end of 2001 season. After 5 months blank, he joined his local club Avispa Fukuoka in J2 League. He played many matches as offensive midfielder. However he could not play at all in the match in 2004. In 2005, he moved to J2 club Sagan Tosu. He played as starting member in all matches until September. In September, he moved to J1 club Cerezo Osaka on loan. Although he played many matches as substitute in 2005, he could hardly play in the match in 2006. In June 2006, he returned to Sagan Tosu. However he could not play many matches. In June 2007, he moved to J2 club Ehime FC. After the transfer, he played full time in all matches in 2007. In 2008, although he played many matches as regular player until the middle of 2008, he could hardly play in the match in late 2008. In 2009, he moved to his local club Avispa Fukuoka for the first time in 5 years. He played many matches and retired end of 2009 season.

== Career statistics ==
Appearances and goals by club, season and competition
Club	Season	League			Emperor's Cup		J.League Cup		Total	
Club	Season	Division	Apps	Goals	Apps	Goals	Apps	Goals	Apps	Goals
Nagoya Grampus Eight	1999	J1 League	0	0	0	0	0	0	0	0
Nagoya Grampus Eight	2000	J1 League	2	0	0	0	0	0	2	0
Nagoya Grampus Eight	2001	J1 League	0	0	0	0	0	0	0	0
Avispa Fukuoka	2002	J2 League	14	0	4	1	—		18	1
Avispa Fukuoka	2003	J2 League	34	2	2	0	—		36	2
Avispa Fukuoka	2004	J2 League	0	0	0	0	—		0	0
Sagan Tosu	2005	J2 League	31	2	0	0	—		31	2
Cerezo Osaka	2005	J1 League	10	0	4	0	0	0	14	0
Cerezo Osaka	2006	J1 League	2	0	0	0	5	0	7	0
Sagan Tosu	2006	J2 League	9	0	0	0	—		9	0
Sagan Tosu	2007	J2 League	4	0	0	0	—		4	0
Ehime FC	2007	J2 League	28	1	4	1	—		32	2
Ehime FC	2008	J2 League	19	1	1	0	—		20	1
Avispa Fukuoka	2009	J2 League	36	0	1	0	—		37	0
Career total			189	6	16	2	5	0	210	8
