= Takashi Hirajima =

Japanese footballer (born 1982)

Takashi Hirajima 平島 崇
Personal information
- Full name: Takashi Hirajima
- Date of birth: February 3, 1982 (age 44)
- Place of birth: Sakai, Japan
- Height: 1.76 m (5 ft 9 1/2 in)
- Position: Defender

Youth career
- 1997–1999: Hatsushiba Hashimoto High School

Senior career*
Years	Team	Apps	(Gls)
2000–2001	Avispa Fukuoka	43	(3)
2003–2006	Avispa Fukuoka	54	(1)
2007–2008	Kyoto Sanga FC	50	(0)
2008–2009	Cerezo Osaka	35	(0)
2010–2012	Tokushima Vortis	58	(2)
2013	AC Nagano Parceiro	12	(1)
Total		252	(7)
- * Club domestic league appearances and goals

Takashi Hirajima (平島 崇, Hirajima Takashi; born February 3, 1982) is a former Japanese football player.

== Playing career ==
Hirajima was born in Sakai on February 3, 1982. After graduating from high school, he joined J1 League club Avispa Fukuoka in 2000. He played many matches as regular right side back in the first season. However he was arrested on charges of violating child pornography laws in late 2001 and his player registration was deleted in 2002. The club results were also bad in 2001 and it was relegated to the J2 League in 2002. He returned as a player in 2003. Although he could not play many matches in 2003, he became a regular player as right side back again in 2004. However he could hardly play in the match in 2005. Although the club was promoted to J1 from 2006, he was released from the club at the end of the 2006 season. In 2007, he moved to J2 club Kyoto Sanga FC. He became a regular player and the club was promoted to J1 in 2008. In July 2008, he moved to the J2 club Cerezo Osaka. He played many matches as right side back until 2009 and the club was promoted to J1 at the end of the 2009 season. In 2010, he moved to the J2 club Tokushima Vortis and became a regular player. However his opportunity to play decreased in 2011. In 2013, he moved to the Japan Football League club AC Nagano Parceiro. Although the club won the championship and was promoted to the new J3 League in 2014, he retired at the end of the 2013 season.

== Club statistics ==
Club performance			League		Cup		League Cup		Total	
Season	Club	League	Apps	Goals	Apps	Goals	Apps	Goals	Apps	Goals
Japan			League		Emperor's Cup		J.League Cup		Total	
2000	Avispa Fukuoka	J1 League	23	2	2	0	4	0	29	2
2001	Avispa Fukuoka	J1 League	20	1	0	0	1	0	21	1
2003	Avispa Fukuoka	J2 League	11	0	3	0	-		14	0
2004	Avispa Fukuoka	J2 League	36	1	1	0	-		37	1
2005	Avispa Fukuoka	J2 League	5	0	2	0	-		7	0
2006	Avispa Fukuoka	J1 League	2	0	0	0	2	0	4	0
2007	Kyoto Sanga FC	J2 League	38	0	0	0	-		38	0
2008	Kyoto Sanga FC	J1 League	12	0	0	0	4	0	16	0
2008	Cerezo Osaka	J2 League	8	0	1	0	-		9	0
2009	Cerezo Osaka	J2 League	27	0	0	0	-		27	0
2010	Tokushima Vortis	J2 League	36	2	2	0	-		38	2
2011	Tokushima Vortis	J2 League	10	0	0	0	-		10	0
2012	Tokushima Vortis	J2 League	12	0	1	0	-		13	0
2013	AC Nagano Parceiro	Football League	12	1	0	0	-		12	1
Total			252	7	12	0	11	0	275	7
