= Tomokazu Nagira =

Japanese footballer

Tomokazu Nagira 柳楽 智和
Personal information
- Full name: Tomokazu Nagira
- Date of birth: October 17, 1985 (age 41)
- Place of birth: Izumo, Shimane, Japan
- Height: 1.78 m (5 ft 10 in)
- Position: Defender

Youth career
- 2001–2003: Rissho University Shonan High School

Senior career*
Years	Team	Apps	(Gls)
2004–2010	Avispa Fukuoka	93	(1)
2011	FC Tokyo	1	(0)
2012–2013	Gainare Tottori	56	(2)
Total		150	(3)

International career
2005	Japan U-20	4	(0)
Medal record
FC Tokyo
Winner	Emperor's Cup	2011
Representing Japan
AFC U-19 Championship
Bronze medal – third place	2004 Malaysia
- * Club domestic league appearances and goals

Tomokazu Nagira (柳楽 智和, Nagira Tomokazu; born October 17, 1985) is a former Japanese football player.

== Club career ==
Nagira was born in Izumo on October 17, 1985. After graduating from high school, he joined Avispa Fukuoka in 2004. He debuted in 2005 and his opportunity to play increased year by year. He moved to FC Tokyo in 2011. However he could hardly play in the match and he moved to Gainare Tottori in 2012. In 2013, although he played as regular player, he retired end of 2013 season.

== National team career ==
In June 2005, Nagira was selected Japan U-20 national team for 2005 World Youth Championship. At this tournament, he played full time in all 4 matches as center back.

== Career statistics ==
Appearances and goals by club, season and competition
Club	Season	League			Emperor's Cup		J.League Cup		Total	
Club	Season	Division	Apps	Goals	Apps	Goals	Apps	Goals	Apps	Goals
Avispa Fukuoka	2004	J2 League	0	0	0	0	—		0	0
Avispa Fukuoka	2005	J2 League	1	0	2	0	—		3	0
Avispa Fukuoka	2006	J1 League	8	0	1	0	3	0	12	0
Avispa Fukuoka	2007	J2 League	11	0	0	0	—		11	0
Avispa Fukuoka	2008	J2 League	27	1	1	0	—		28	1
Avispa Fukuoka	2009	J2 League	35	0	1	0	—		36	0
Avispa Fukuoka	2010	J2 League	11	0	3	0	—		14	0
Career total			93	1	8	0	3	0	104	1
