= Takaaki =

- Gender: Male

Origin
- Origin: Japanese
- Meaning: Different meanings depending on the kanji used

Takaaki is a masculine Japanese given name. Notable people with the name include:

- Takaaki Ishibashi (石橋 貴明, born 1961) Japanese comedy artist, singer and actor
- Takaaki Kajita (梶田隆章, born 1959) Japanese physicist, Nobel laureate
- Takaaki Kaneiri (金入 孝明; born 1943), Japanese ice hockey player
- Katō Takaaki (加藤 高明, 1860–1926) politician, 24th Prime Minister of Japan
- Takaaki Nakagami (中上 貴晶, born 1992) Japanese motorcycle racer
- Takaaki Suzuki (鈴木 孝明, born 1981) Japanese football player
- Takaaki Tamura (田村 貴昭), Japanese politician
- Takaaki Tokushige (徳重 隆明, born 1975) Japanese football player
- Takaaki Watanabe, (渡辺 高章) pro wrestler, member of New Japan Pro Wrestling
- Takaaki Yoshimoto (吉本 隆明, 1924–2012) also known as Ryūmei Yoshimoto, Japanese poet, literary critic, and philosopher
