= Firoj Mahmud Titu =

Bangladeshi footballer

Personal information
- Full name: Firoj Mahmud Hossain Titu
- Date of birth: 8 July 1974 (age 52)
- Place of birth: Dhaka, Bangladesh
- Height: 1.70 m (5 ft 7 in)
- Position: Full-back

Youth career
- –: BKSP

Senior career*
Years	Team	Apps	(Gls)
1994–1999	Fakirerpool		
1999–2000	Arambagh		
2000–2002	Dhaka Abahani		
2002–2004	Mohammedan		
2004–2005	Brothers Union		
2005–2012	Muktijoddha		

International career
1991	Bangladesh U16		
2000	Bangladesh U19		
2002–2006	Bangladesh U23		(1)
1999–2008	Bangladesh	31	(2)
Medal record
Representing Bangladesh
Men's football
SAFF Championship
Winner	2003 Bangladesh
- * Club domestic league appearances and goals

Firoj Mahmud Hossain (Bengali: ফিরোজ মাহমুদ হোসেন; born 8 August 1974), known by his nickname Titu, is a Bangladeshi former professional footballer who played as a full-back.

He played for the Bangladesh national team from 1999 to 2007. He is famous for his goal against FR Yugoslavia during the 2001 Sahara Cup becoming the first and only Bangladeshi player to score against a European team to date.

== Club career ==
Titu, a BKSP student, started playing domestic football with Fakirerpool Young Men's Club during the 1994–95 season. He later won the Premier Division League title with Abahani Limited, Mohammedan SC and Brothers Union. He spent the last seven years of his career with Muktijoddha Sangsad KC and also served as the club captain. On 13 October 2012, he retired after playing 36 minutes for Muktijoddha against Dhanmondi Club in the 2012 Federation Cup.

=== Controversy ===
After not receiving payment from Muktijoddha Sangsad KC on multiple occasions, even though he was under contract with the club, Titu and several players criticized the club officials, alleging that the officials had misappropriated their money.

== International career ==
Titu represented and captained Bangladesh at U16, U19 and U23 level. On 21 November 1999, Titu made his debut for Bangladesh against Uzbekistan during the 2000 AFC Asian Cup qualifiers. He scored twice during his time with the national team, his goals came against Hong Kong in the 2004 AFC Asian Cup qualifiers and against Pakistan during the 2007 AFC Asian Cup qualifiers. He was also part of the 2003 SAFF Championship winning Bangladesh team.

== International goals ==
Scores and results list Bangladesh's goal tally first.

=== Bangladesh U23 ===
#	Date	Venue	Opponent	Score	Result	Competition
1.	19 August 2006	Sugathadasa Stadium, Colombo	India	1–2	1–2	2006 South Asian Games

=== Bangladesh ===
#	Date	Venue	Opponent	Score	Result	Competition
-.	16 January 2001	Jawaharlal Nehru Stadium, India	FR Yugoslavia	1–0	1–4	2001 Sahara Cup
1.	30 March 2003	Hong Kong	Hong Kong	1–2	2–2	2004 AFC Asian Cup qualifiers
2.	26 December 2005	People's Football Stadium, Karachi, Pakistan	Pakistan	1–0	1–0	2007 AFC Asian Cup qualifiers

== Honours ==
Abahani Limited Dhaka

- Dhaka Premier Division League: 2001
- Federation Cup: 2000
- National League 2000

Mohammedan SC

- Dhaka Premier Division League: 2002
- Federation Cup: 2002

Brothers Union

- Dhaka Premier Division League: 2003–04

Bangladesh

- SAFF Championship: 2003
