= Kenta Kifuji =

Japanese footballer

Kenta Kifuji 木藤 健太
Personal information
- Full name: Kenta Kifuji
- Date of birth: October 5, 1981 (age 45)
- Place of birth: Nagasaki, Japan
- Height: 1.72 m (5 ft 7 1/2 in)
- Position: Defender

Youth career
- 1997–1999: Kunimi High School
- 2000–2003: Kindai University

Senior career*
Years	Team	Apps	(Gls)
2004–2005	Avispa Fukuoka	0	(0)
2006–2009	Montedio Yamagata	33	(1)
Total		33	(1)
- * Club domestic league appearances and goals

Kenta Kifuji (木藤 健太, Kifuji Kenta; born October 5, 1981) is a former Japanese football player.

== Career statistics ==
Appearances and goals by club, season and competition
Club	Season	League			Emperor's Cup		J.League Cup		Total	
Club	Season	Division	Apps	Goals	Apps	Goals	Apps	Goals	Apps	Goals
Avispa Fukuoka	2004	J2 League	0	0	0	0	-		0	0
Avispa Fukuoka	2005	J2 League	0	0	1	0	-		1	0
Montedio Yamagata	2006	J2 League	10	0	1	0	-		11	0
Montedio Yamagata	2007	J2 League	13	1	2	0	-		15	1
Montedio Yamagata	2008	J2 League	10	0	1	0	-		11	0
Montedio Yamagata	2009	J1 League	0	0	0	0	0	0	0	0
Career total			33	1	5	0	0	0	38	1
