= Tomoji Eguchi =

Japanese footballer

Tomoji Eguchi 江口 倫司
Personal information
- Full name: Tomoji Eguchi
- Date of birth: April 22, 1977 (age 49)
- Place of birth: Hyogo, Japan
- Height: 1.83 m (6 ft 0 in)
- Position: Forward

Youth career
- 1993–1995: Kwansei Gakuin High School

Senior career*
Years	Team	Apps	(Gls)
1996–1999	Vissel Kobe		
2000–2003	Avispa Fukuoka	71	(16)
Total		71	(16)
- * Club domestic league appearances and goals

Tomoji Eguchi (江口 倫司, Eguchi Tomoji; born April 22, 1977) is a former Japanese football player.

== Playing career ==
Eguchi was born in Hyogo Prefecture on April 22, 1977. After graduating from high school, he joined Japan Football League club Vissel Kobe based in his local in 1996. The club won the 2nd place in 1996 and was promoted to J1 League from 1997. He played many matches as forward until 1998. However, he could hardly play in the match in 1999. In 2000, he moved to Avispa Fukuoka. Although he played many matches, the club was relegated to J2 League from 2002. He retired end of 2003 season. He became a member of the coaching staff of Vissel Kobe in 2004 and in 2022 began his own football academy in conjunction with Kobe Regatta & Athletic Club - Japan's longest running sports club - founded in 1870.

== Career statistics ==
Appearances and goals by club, season and competition
Club	Season	League			Emperor's Cup		J.League Cup		Total	
Club	Season	Division	Apps	Goals	Apps	Goals	Apps	Goals	Apps	Goals
Vissel Kobe	1996	Football League								
Vissel Kobe	1997	J1 League	13	4	2	1	2	0	17	5
Vissel Kobe	1998	J1 League	22	0	0	0	1	0	23	0
Vissel Kobe	1999	J1 League	1	0	1	0	0	0	2	0
Avispa Fukuoka	2000	J1 League	23	2	0	0	4	1	27	3
Avispa Fukuoka	2001	J1 League	13	3	1	0	1	0	15	3
Avispa Fukuoka	2002	J2 League	30	10	3	2	—		33	12
Avispa Fukuoka	2003	J2 League	5	1	0	0	—		5	1
Career total			107	20	7	3	8	1	122	24
