= Seiji Koga =

Japanese footballer

Seiji Koga 古賀 誠史
Personal information
- Full name: Seiji Koga
- Date of birth: August 7, 1979 (age 47)
- Place of birth: Okawa, Fukuoka, Japan
- Height: 1.71 m (5 ft 7 1/2 in)
- Position: Midfielder

Youth career
- 1995–1997: Higashi Fukuoka High School

Senior career*
Years	Team	Apps	(Gls)
1998–2001	Yokohama F. Marinos	9	(0)
2002–2007	Avispa Fukuoka	134	(23)
2007–2009	Vissel Kobe	34	(3)
2010–2012	SC Sagamihara		
Total		177	(26)
Medal record
Yokohama F. Marinos
Runner-up	J1 League	2000
Winner	J.League Cup	2001
Representing Japan
AFC U-19 Championship
Silver medal – second place	1998 Thailand
- * Club domestic league appearances and goals

Seiji Koga (古賀 誠史, Koga Seiji; born August 7, 1979) is a former Japanese football player. His brother Masahiro Koga is also former footballer.

== Playing career ==
Koga was born in Okawa on August 7, 1979. After graduating from high school, he joined the J1 League club Yokohama Marinos (later Yokohama F. Marinos) in 1998. Although, he played several matches as an offensive midfielder every season, he did not play in many matches. In 2002, he moved to the J2 League club Avispa Fukuoka based in his local area. He played many matches as left offensive midfielder and the club was promoted to J1 in 2006. However the club was relegated to J2 in a year and his opportunity to play decreased in 2007. He became a regular player and played often until May 2008. After that, he could not play due to an injury. Although he came back in July 2009, he was released from the club at the end of the 2009 season. In May 2010, he joined the Prefectural Leagues club SC Sagamihara. He played often and the club was promoted to the Regional Leagues in 2011. He retired at the end of the 2012 season.

== Career statistics ==
Appearances and goals by club, season and competition
Club	Season	League			Emperor's Cup		J.League Cup		Total	
Club	Season	Division	Apps	Goals	Apps	Goals	Apps	Goals	Apps	Goals
Yokohama Marinos	1998	J1 League	3	0	0	0	0	0	3	0
Yokohama F. Marinos	1999	J1 League	2	0	0	0	0	0	2	0
Yokohama F. Marinos	2000	J1 League	0	0	0	0	2	0	2	0
Yokohama F. Marinos	2001	J1 League	4	0	0	0	1	0	5	0
Avispa Fukuoka	2002	J2 League	17	1	0	0	—		17	1
Avispa Fukuoka	2003	J2 League	25	5	3	2	—		28	7
Avispa Fukuoka	2004	J2 League	33	9	0	0	—		33	9
Avispa Fukuoka	2005	J2 League	30	5	0	0	—		30	5
Avispa Fukuoka	2006	J1 League	21	1	2	0	4	0	27	1
Avispa Fukuoka	2007	J2 League	8	2	0	0	—		8	2
Vissel Kobe	2007	J1 League	11	3	2	0	0	0	13	3
Vissel Kobe	2008	J1 League	13	0	3	0	0	0	16	0
Vissel Kobe	2009	J1 League	10	0	3	0	0	0	13	0
Career total			177	26	13	2	7	0	197	28
