= Alan (footballer, born 1983) =

Brazilian footballer

Personal information
- Full name: Alan Geraldo de Melo Santos
- Date of birth: April 16, 1983 (age 43)
- Place of birth: Diamantina, Minas Gerais, Brazil
- Height: 1.74 m (5 ft 8 1/2 in)
- Position: Forward

Team information
- Current team: Reinmeer Aomori
- Number: 29

Youth career
- 1996–2002: Cruzeiro

Senior career*
Years	Team	Apps	(Gls)
2003–2004	Rio Branco		
2005	Torino		
2005	Ipatinga		
2006–2007	Inter de Limeira		
2008	Jataiense		
2008–2009	Kitakyushu	11	(1)
2010–2014	Fujieda MYFC	75	(35)
2014	Dezzolla Shimane	14	(16)
2015	ReinMeer Aomori	14	(12)
- * Club domestic league appearances and goals as of 20 January 2014

Alan Geraldo de Melo Santos, or simply Alan (born April 16, 1983), is a Brazilian footballer. He is currently a free agent after leaving his most recent team, Fujieda MYFC.

== Personal life ==
His twin brother Alex is also a professional footballer who plays for Tokushima Vortis in the J. League Division 2.
