= Keisuke Ota (footballer, born 1979) =

Japanese footballer

Keisuke Ota 太田 恵介
Personal information
- Full name: Keisuke Ota
- Date of birth: April 24, 1979 (age 47)
- Place of birth: Shizuoka, Shizuoka, Japan
- Height: 1.96 m (6 ft 5 in)
- Position: Forward

Youth career
- 1995–1997: Shimizu Commercial High School
- 1998–2001: Fukuoka University

Senior career*
Years	Team	Apps	(Gls)
2002–2005	Avispa Fukuoka	63	(8)
2006	Thespa Kusatsu	38	(4)
2007	Minnesota Thunder	19	(2)
2008	V-Varen Nagasaki	1	(0)
Total		121	(14)
- * Club domestic league appearances and goals

Keisuke Ota (太田 恵介, Ōta Keisuke; born April 24, 1979) is a former Japanese football player.

== Club career ==
Ota was educated at and played for Shimizu Commercial High School and Fukuoka University.

After graduating from the university in 2002, Ota joined J2 League side Avispa Fukuoka. His first appearance in J2 League came on September 11, 2002, against Mito HollyHock. He scored his first professional goal on July 26, 2003, against Albirex Niigata. In April 2004, he crashed into the goal post and damaged his spleen as he scored against Omiya Ardija. Because of this injury, he was sidelined for more than three months. Although he was instrumental in Avispa's promotion in the 2005 season by playing 22 games and scoring 2 goals, he was released from the club. He played the 2006 season with fellow J2 side Thespa Kusatsu. The Minnesota Thunder signed him in February 2007, but he returned to Japan with V-Varen Nagasaki in 2008. He retired from the game at the end of the 2008 season.

== National team career ==
Ota represented Japan for the 2001 Summer Universiade held in Beijing where the team won the title beating Ukraine in the final. He played 5 matches in the tournament.

== Club statistics ==
Club performance			League		Cup		Total	
Season	Club	League	Apps	Goals	Apps	Goals	Apps	Goals
Japan			League		Emperor's Cup		Total	
2002	Avispa Fukuoka	J2 League	4	1	0	0	4	1
2003	Avispa Fukuoka	J2 League	11	2	1	0	12	2
2004	Avispa Fukuoka	J2 League	24	5	2	2	26	7
2005	Avispa Fukuoka	J2 League	24	2	0	0	24	2
2006	Thespa Kusatsu	J2 League	38	4	1	0	39	4
United States			League		Open Cup		Total	
2007	Minnesota Thunder	USL First Division	19	2			19	2
Japan			League		Emperor's Cup		Total	
2008	V-Varen Nagasaki	Regional Leagues	1	0	-		1	0
Country	Japan		102	14	4	2	106	16
Country	United States		19	2			19	2
Total			121	16	4	2	125	18
