= Shingo Honda =

Japanese footballer

Personal information
- Date of birth: November 23, 1987 (age 38)
- Place of birth: Kumamoto, Japan
- Height: 1.74 m (5 ft 8 1/2 in)
- Position: Midfielder

Youth career
- 2003–2005: Kumamoto Kenritsu; Ozu High School

Senior career*
Years	Team	Apps	(Gls)
2006–2008	Avispa Fukuoka	4	(0)
2009	Japan Soccer College	13	(1)
2010	Matsumoto Yamaga	23	(2)
2011–2016	Zweigen Kanazawa	47	(1)
2014–2016	→ Honda FC (loan)	28	(0)
- * Club domestic league appearances and goals as of 1 March 2018

Shingo Honda (本田 真吾, Honda Shingo; born November 23, 1987) is a former Japanese football player. He last played for Honda FC. Honda previously played for Avispa Fukuoka in the J2 League.

== Club statistics ==
Updated to 1 March 2018.

Club performance			League		Cup		League Cup		Total	
Season	Club	League	Apps	Goals	Apps	Goals	Apps	Goals	Apps	Goals
Japan			League		Emperor's Cup		J.League Cup		Total	
2006	Avispa Fukuoka	J1 League	0	0	0	0	0	0	0	0
2007	Avispa Fukuoka	J2 League	4	0	0	0	-		4	0
2008	Avispa Fukuoka	J2 League	0	0	0	0	-		0	0
2009	Japan Soccer College	JRL (Hokushinetsu)	13	1	2	0	-		15	1
2010	Matsumoto Yamaga	JFL	23	2	2	0	-		25	2
2011	Zweigen Kanazawa	JFL	25	0	2	1	-		26	1
2012	Zweigen Kanazawa	JFL	18	1	1	0	-		19	1
2013	Zweigen Kanazawa	JFL	0	0	0	0	-		0	0
2014	Zweigen Kanazawa	J3 League	4	0	0	0	-		4	0
2014	Honda FC	JFL	6	0	-		-		6	0
2015	Honda FC	JFL	14	0	-		-		14	0
2016	Honda FC	JFL	8	0	1	0	-		9	0
Total			115	4	8	1	0	0	123	5
