= Yusuke Tanaka (footballer, born February 1986) =

Japanese footballer

Yusuke Tanaka 田中 佑昌
Personal information
- Full name: Yusuke Tanaka
- Date of birth: February 3, 1986 (age 40)
- Place of birth: Yame, Fukuoka, Japan
- Height: 1.76 m (5 ft 9 1/2 in)
- Position: Midfielder

Team information
- Current team: Kataller Toyama
- Number: 27

Youth career
- 2001–2003: Avispa Fukuoka

Senior career*
Years	Team	Apps	(Gls)
2004–2011	Avispa Fukuoka	263	(37)
2012–2015	JEF United Chiba	121	(19)
2016–2019	Ventforet Kofu	108	(5)
2020–	Kataller Toyama	16	(3)
- * Club domestic league appearances and goals as of 23 February 2020

Yusuke Tanaka (田中 佑昌, Tanaka Yūsuke; born 3 February 1986) is a Japanese football player who plays for Kataller Toyama.

== Club statistics ==
Updated to 23 February 2020.

Club	Season	League		Emperor's Cup		J.League Cup		Total	
Club	Season	Apps	Goals	Apps	Goals	Apps	Goals	Apps	Goals
Avispa Fukuoka	2004	28	1	1	1	–		29	2
Avispa Fukuoka	2005	33	7	0	0	–		33	7
Avispa Fukuoka	2006	22	2	2	0	1	0	25	2
Avispa Fukuoka	2007	46	5	2	0	–		48	5
Avispa Fukuoka	2008	39	7	1	0	–		40	7
Avispa Fukuoka	2009	40	10	2	0	–		42	10
Avispa Fukuoka	2010	23	5	3	1	–		26	6
Avispa Fukuoka	2011	32	1	2	0	1	0	35	1
JEF United Chiba	2012	34	8	1	0	–		35	8
JEF United Chiba	2013	37	9	1	0	–		38	9
JEF United Chiba	2014	22	0	1	0	–		23	0
JEF United Chiba	2015	28	1	2	0	–		30	1
Ventforet Kofu	2016	34	5	1	0	4	0	39	5
Ventforet Kofu	2017	32	0	0	0	0	0	32	0
Ventforet Kofu	2018	21	0	4	3	5	0	34	3
Ventforet Kofu	2019	21	0	1	0	–		22	0
Career total		492	61	24	5	11	0	534	66
