= Pingo (footballer, born 1980) =

Brazilian footballer

Personal information
- Full name: Erison Carlos dos Santos Silva
- Date of birth: May 22, 1980 (age 46)
- Place of birth: Barra do Piraí, Brazil
- Height: 1.75 m (5 ft 9 in)
- Position: Midfielder

Senior career*
| Years | Team | Apps | (Gls) |
| 2000–2004 | Corinthians | 24 | (0) |
| 2004 | Atlético Paranaense | 0 | (0) |
| 2005 | São Caetano | 31 | (3) |
| 2006 | Cerezo Osaka | 20 | (2) |
| 2007 | Ponte Preta | 30 | (5) |
| 2008 | Busan I'Park | 17 | (0) |
| 2009 | Avaí | 1 | (0) |
- * Club domestic league appearances and goals

Erison Carlos dos Santos Silva (born May 22, 1980) is a former Brazilian football player.

== Club statistics ==
| Club performance | | | League | | Cup | | League Cup | | Total | |
| Season | Club | League | Apps | Goals | Apps | Goals | Apps | Goals | Apps | Goals |
| Brazil | | | League | | Copa do Brasil | | League Cup | | Total | |
|---|---|---|---|---|---|---|---|---|---|---|
| 2000 | Corinthians Paulista | Série A | 0 | 0 | | | | | 0 | 0 |
| 2001 | Corinthians Paulista | Série A | 4 | 0 | | | | | 4 | 0 |
| 2002 | Corinthians Paulista | Série A | 2 | 0 | | | | | 2 | 0 |
| 2003 | Corinthians Paulista | Série A | 18 | 0 | | | | | 18 | 0 |
| 2004 | Corinthians Paulista | Série A | 0 | 0 | | | | | 0 | 0 |
| 2004 | Atlético Paranaense | Série A | 0 | 0 | | | | | 0 | 0 |
| 2005 | São Caetano | Série A | 31 | 3 | | | | | 31 | 3 |
| Japan | | | League | | Emperor's Cup | | J.League Cup | | Total | |
| 2006 | Cerezo Osaka | J1 League | 20 | 2 | 1 | 0 | 5 | 1 | 26 | 3 |
| Brazil | | | League | | Copa do Brasil | | League Cup | | Total | |
| 2007 | Ponte Preta | Série B | 30 | 5 | | | | | 30 | 5 |
| Korea Republic | | | League | | FA Cup | | K-League Cup | | Total | |
| 2008 | Busan I'Park | K-League | 17 | 0 | 2 | 0 | 7 | 0 | 26 | 0 |
| Brazil | | | League | | Copa do Brasil | | League Cup | | Total | |
| 2009 | Avaí | Série A | 1 | 0 | | | | | 1 | 0 |
| Country | Brazil | | 86 | 8 | | | | | 86 | 8 |
| Country | Japan | | 20 | 2 | 1 | 0 | 5 | 1 | 26 | 3 |
| Country | Korea Republic | | 17 | 0 | 2 | 0 | 7 | 0 | 26 | 0 |
| Total | | | 123 | 10 | 3 | 0 | 12 | 1 | 138 | 11 |
