= Takaaki Suzuki =

Japanese footballer

Personal information
- Full name: Takaaki Suzuki
- Date of birth: October 7, 1981 (age 45)
- Place of birth: Shizuoka, Japan
- Height: 1.80 m (5 ft 11 in)
- Position: Forward

Youth career
- 2000–2003: University of Tsukuba

Senior career*
Years	Team	Apps	(Gls)
2005–2006	Sagan Tosu	68	(17)
2007	Mito HollyHock	17	(0)
Total		85	(17)
- * Club domestic league appearances and goals

Takaaki Suzuki (鈴木 孝明, Suzuki Takaaki; born October 7, 1981) is a former Japanese football player.

== Career statistics ==
Appearances and goals by club, season and competition
Club	Season	League			Emperor's Cup		Total	
Club	Season	Division	Apps	Goals	Apps	Goals	Apps	Goals
Sagan Tosu	2005	J2 League	44	15	2	0	46	15
Sagan Tosu	2006	J2 League	24	2	0	0	24	2
Mito HollyHock	2007	J2 League	17	0	0	0	17	0
Career total			85	17	2	0	87	17
