= 2014 Tokushima Vortis season =

Tokushima Vortis
2014 season
- Manager: Shinji Kobayashi
- Stadium: Pocarisweat Stadium
- J1 League: 18th

During the 2014 season, Tokushima Vortis competed in the J. League 1, where they finished 18th, and were thus relegated to the J2 League. The club also competed in the Emperor's Cup and the J. League Cup.

== J1 League ==
=== League table ===
Pos	Team	Pld	W	D	L	GF	GA	GD	Pts	Qualification or relegation
14	Vegalta Sendai	34	9	11	14	35	50	−15	38	
15	Shimizu S-Pulse	34	10	6	18	42	60	−18	36	
16	Omiya Ardija (R)	34	9	8	17	44	60	−16	35	Relegation to 2015 J2 League
17	Cerezo Osaka (R)	34	7	10	17	36	48	−12	31	Relegation to 2015 J2 League
18	Tokushima Vortis (R)	34	3	5	26	16	74	−58	14	Relegation to 2015 J2 League

Updated to match(es) played on 8 December 2014. Source: J.League Data
Rules for classification: 1) points; 2) goal difference; 3) number of goals scored.
(R) Relegated

=== Matches ===
J1 League results
Match	Date	Team	Score	Team	Venue	Attendance
1	2014.03.01	Sagan Tosu	5-0	Tokushima Vortis	Best Amenity Stadium	14,296
2	2014.03.08	Tokushima Vortis	0-2	Cerezo Osaka	Pocarisweat Stadium	12,202
3	2014.03.15	Yokohama F. Marinos	3-0	Tokushima Vortis	NHK Spring Mitsuzawa Football Stadium	11,088
4	2014.03.23	Tokushima Vortis	0-2	Kashiwa Reysol	Pocarisweat Stadium	8,097
5	2014.03.29	Sanfrecce Hiroshima	3-1	Tokushima Vortis	Edion Stadium Hiroshima	11,766
6	2014.04.06	Tokushima Vortis	0-4	Kawasaki Frontale	Pocarisweat Stadium	8,467
7	2014.04.12	Vissel Kobe	3-0	Tokushima Vortis	Noevir Stadium Kobe	13,408
8	2014.04.19	Tokushima Vortis	0-4	Shimizu S-Pulse	Pocarisweat Stadium	6,113
9	2014.04.26	Tokushima Vortis	1-2	Albirex Niigata	Pocarisweat Stadium	6,096
10	2014.04.29	Ventforet Kofu	0-1	Tokushima Vortis	Yamanashi Chuo Bank Stadium	8,665
11	2014.05.03	Tokushima Vortis	0-1	Vegalta Sendai	Pocarisweat Stadium	9,686
12	2014.05.06	Gamba Osaka	3-0	Tokushima Vortis	Expo '70 Commemorative Stadium	12,654
13	2014.05.10	Tokushima Vortis	0-0	FC Tokyo	Pocarisweat Stadium	7,451
14	2014.05.17	Kashima Antlers	1-0	Tokushima Vortis	Kashima Soccer Stadium	13,544
15	2014.07.19	Nagoya Grampus	1-1	Tokushima Vortis	Toyota Stadium	22,635
16	2014.07.23	Tokushima Vortis	0-2	Urawa Reds	Pocarisweat Stadium	10,860
17	2014.07.27	Omiya Ardija	1-3	Tokushima Vortis	NACK5 Stadium Omiya	8,123
18	2014.08.02	Tokushima Vortis	2-2	Ventforet Kofu	Pocarisweat Stadium	3,594
19	2014.08.09	Shimizu S-Pulse	1-0	Tokushima Vortis	IAI Stadium Nihondaira	11,887
20	2014.08.16	Tokushima Vortis	0-3	Yokohama F. Marinos	Pocarisweat Stadium	12,034
21	2014.08.23	Albirex Niigata	1-2	Tokushima Vortis	Denka Big Swan Stadium	24,903
22	2014.08.30	Tokushima Vortis	0-1	Sanfrecce Hiroshima	Pocarisweat Stadium	11,640
23	2014.09.13	Kawasaki Frontale	4-0	Tokushima Vortis	Kawasaki Todoroki Stadium	18,444
24	2014.09.20	Tokushima Vortis	0-2	Omiya Ardija	Pocarisweat Stadium	5,996
25	2014.09.23	FC Tokyo	4-0	Tokushima Vortis	Ajinomoto Stadium	22,187
26	2014.09.27	Tokushima Vortis	0-5	Kashima Antlers	Pocarisweat Stadium	10,493
27	2014.10.05	Urawa Reds	2-1	Tokushima Vortis	Saitama Stadium 2002	23,294
28	2014.10.18	Tokushima Vortis	2-2	Vissel Kobe	Pocarisweat Stadium	6,678
29	2014.10.22	Cerezo Osaka	3-1	Tokushima Vortis	Kincho Stadium	10,262
30	2014.10.26	Tokushima Vortis	0-2	Nagoya Grampus	Pocarisweat Stadium	8,094
31	2014.11.02	Kashiwa Reysol	2-0	Tokushima Vortis	Hitachi Kashiwa Stadium	9,251
32	2014.11.22	Tokushima Vortis	0-1	Sagan Tosu	Pocarisweat Stadium	6,259
33	2014.11.29	Vegalta Sendai	2-1	Tokushima Vortis	Yurtec Stadium Sendai	17,152
34	2014.12.06	Tokushima Vortis	0-0	Gamba Osaka	Pocarisweat Stadium	17,274
