= Ryuichi Kamiyama =

Japanese footballer

Ryuichi Kamiyama 神山 竜一
Personal information
- Full name: Ryuichi Kamiyama
- Date of birth: 10 November 1984 (age 41)
- Place of birth: Sakai, Japan
- Height: 1.88 m (6 ft 2 in)
- Position: Goalkeeper

Team information
- Current team: ReinMeer Aomori
- Number: 1

Youth career
- 2000–2002: Rissho University Shonan High School

Senior career*
Years	Team	Apps	(Gls)
2003–2018	Avispa Fukuoka	242	(0)
2019–	ReinMeer Aomori		
- * Club domestic league appearances and goals as of end of 2018 season

Ryuichi Kamiyama (神山 竜一, Kamiyama Ryūichi; born 10 November 1984) is a Japanese football player.

== Club statistics ==
Updated to 23 February 2018.

Club performance			League		Cup		League Cup		Other		Total	
Season	Club	League	Apps	Goals	Apps	Goals	Apps	Goals	Apps	Goals	Apps	Goals
Japan			League		Emperor's Cup		J.League Cup		Other^{1}		Total	
2003	Avispa Fukuoka	J2 League	0	0	0	0	-		-		0	0
2004	Avispa Fukuoka	J2 League	0	0	0	0	-		-		0	0
2005	Avispa Fukuoka	J2 League	0	0	1	0	-		-		1	0
2006	Avispa Fukuoka	J1 League	1	0	2	0	6	0	-		9	0
2007	Avispa Fukuoka	J2 League	48	0	2	0	-		-		50	0
2008	Avispa Fukuoka	J2 League	22	0	0	0	-		-		22	0
2009	Avispa Fukuoka	J2 League	0	0	0	0	-		-		0	0
2010	Avispa Fukuoka	J2 League	28	0	2	0	-		-		30	0
2011	Avispa Fukuoka	J1 League	17	0	1	0	2	0	-		20	0
2012	Avispa Fukuoka	J2 League	32	0	0	0	-	-	-		32	0
2013	Avispa Fukuoka	J2 League	28	0	0	0	-		-		28	0
2014	Avispa Fukuoka	J2 League	37	0	0	0	-		-		37	0
2015	Avispa Fukuoka	J2 League	21	0	2	0	-		0	0	23	0
2016	Avispa Fukuoka	J1 League	8	0	1	0	4	0	-		13	0
2017	Avispa Fukuoka	J2 League	0	0	0	0	-		0	0	0	0
2018	Avispa Fukuoka	J2 League	0	0	0	0	-		0	0	0	0
Career total			242	0	11	0	12	0	0	0	265	0

^{1}Includes Promotion Playoffs to J1.
