= 2013 Tokushima Vortis season =

Tokushima Vortis
2013 season
- Manager: Shinji Kobayashi
- Stadium: Pocarisweat Stadium
- J2 League: 4th

2013 Tokushima Vortis season.

== J2 League ==
Match	Date	Team	Score	Team	Venue	Attendance
1	2013.03.03	Tokushima Vortis	0-1	Vissel Kobe	Pocarisweat Stadium	7,917
2	2013.03.10	Yokohama FC	2-2	Tokushima Vortis	NHK Spring Mitsuzawa Football Stadium	8,437
3	2013.03.17	Tokushima Vortis	1-2	Giravanz Kitakyushu	Pocarisweat Stadium	3,299
4	2013.03.20	Tokushima Vortis	2-1	Avispa Fukuoka	Pocarisweat Stadium	2,921
5	2013.03.24	FC Gifu	0-1	Tokushima Vortis	Gifu Nagaragawa Stadium	3,294
6	2013.03.31	Kyoto Sanga FC	1-2	Tokushima Vortis	Kyoto Nishikyogoku Athletic Stadium	6,128
7	2013.04.07	Tokushima Vortis	1-2	V-Varen Nagasaki	Pocarisweat Stadium	3,488
8	2013.04.14	Consadole Sapporo	2-1	Tokushima Vortis	Sapporo Dome	8,173
9	2013.04.17	Tokushima Vortis	0-1	Tochigi SC	Pocarisweat Stadium	2,325
10	2013.04.21	Tokushima Vortis	3-2	Ehime FC	Pocarisweat Stadium	5,215
11	2013.04.28	Thespakusatsu Gunma	4-1	Tokushima Vortis	Shoda Shoyu Stadium Gunma	2,542
12	2013.05.03	Gainare Tottori	0-1	Tokushima Vortis	Tottori Bank Bird Stadium	6,123
13	2013.05.06	Tokushima Vortis	0-3	Roasso Kumamoto	Pocarisweat Stadium	4,583
14	2013.05.12	Tokushima Vortis	3-1	Mito HollyHock	Pocarisweat Stadium	2,797
15	2013.05.19	Fagiano Okayama	2-0	Tokushima Vortis	Kanko Stadium	8,510
16	2013.05.26	Tokushima Vortis	2-1	Tokyo Verdy	Pocarisweat Stadium	3,312
17	2013.06.01	Kataller Toyama	2-1	Tokushima Vortis	Toyama Stadium	3,230
18	2013.06.08	Montedio Yamagata	2-2	Tokushima Vortis	ND Soft Stadium Yamagata	6,509
19	2013.06.14	Tokushima Vortis	2-0	Matsumoto Yamaga FC	Pocarisweat Stadium	2,717
20	2013.06.22	Tokushima Vortis	1-2	JEF United Chiba	Pocarisweat Stadium	4,190
21	2013.06.29	Gamba Osaka	2-0	Tokushima Vortis	Expo '70 Commemorative Stadium	13,708
22	2013.07.03	Tokushima Vortis	1-0	Consadole Sapporo	Pocarisweat Stadium	1,875
23	2013.07.07	Giravanz Kitakyushu	0-2	Tokushima Vortis	Honjo Stadium	1,732
24	2013.07.14	Ehime FC	0-2	Tokushima Vortis	Ningineer Stadium	6,516
25	2013.07.20	Tokushima Vortis	4-1	Thespakusatsu Gunma	Pocarisweat Stadium	4,664
26	2013.07.27	JEF United Chiba	1-2	Tokushima Vortis	Fukuda Denshi Arena	8,852
27	2013.08.04	Tokushima Vortis	3-1	FC Gifu	Pocarisweat Stadium	3,904
28	2013.08.11	Matsumoto Yamaga FC	0-0	Tokushima Vortis	Matsumotodaira Park Stadium	10,680
29	2013.08.18	Tokushima Vortis	2-0	Kataller Toyama	Pocarisweat Stadium	4,562
30	2013.08.21	Roasso Kumamoto	0-1	Tokushima Vortis	Umakana-Yokana Stadium	4,052
31	2013.08.25	Tokushima Vortis	1-1	Kyoto Sanga FC	Pocarisweat Stadium	5,129
32	2013.09.01	Tochigi SC	0-1	Tokushima Vortis	Tochigi Green Stadium	2,742
33	2013.09.16	Tokushima Vortis	2-2	Montedio Yamagata	Pocarisweat Stadium	3,414
34	2013.09.22	Vissel Kobe	3-2	Tokushima Vortis	Kobe Universiade Memorial Stadium	12,311
35	2013.09.29	Tokushima Vortis	2-1	Gainare Tottori	Pocarisweat Stadium	4,508
36	2013.10.06	Mito HollyHock	0-0	Tokushima Vortis	K's denki Stadium Mito	3,715
37	2013.10.20	Tokushima Vortis	0-1	Yokohama FC	Pocarisweat Stadium	4,706
38	2013.10.27	Tokushima Vortis	1-5	Gamba Osaka	Pocarisweat Stadium	8,897
39	2013.11.03	Avispa Fukuoka	1-0	Tokushima Vortis	Level5 Stadium	4,253
40	2013.11.10	Tokushima Vortis	2-0	Fagiano Okayama	Pocarisweat Stadium	6,880
41	2013.11.17	Tokyo Verdy	1-1	Tokushima Vortis	Ajinomoto Stadium	4,777
42	2013.11.24	V-Varen Nagasaki	0-1	Tokushima Vortis	Nagasaki Stadium	11,214
