= Roberto (footballer, born 1979) =

Brazilian footballer

Personal information
- Full name: Roberto Júlio de Figueiredo
- Date of birth: February 20, 1979 (age 47)
- Place of birth: Maringá, Brazil
- Height: 1.80 m (5 ft 11 in)
- Position: Midfielder

Senior career*
Years	Team	Apps	(Gls)
1998–2003	Ponte Preta	106	(0)
2004–2006	Avispa Fukuoka	97	(5)
2007–2009	Oita Trinita	45	(1)
2009	Sagan Tosu	13	(1)
2010–2012	Yokohama FC	22	(1)
2011	→ FC Tokyo (loan)	1	(0)
- * Club domestic league appearances and goals

Roberto Júlio de Figueiredo (born 20 February 1979) is a Brazilian former footballer.

== Career ==
Born in Maringá, Paraná, Roberto has played with FC Tokyo of J2 League, and has previously played with Oita Trinita and Avispa Fukuoka in Japan and Ponte Preta in Campinas, São Paulo, Brazil.

== Club statistics ==
Club performance			League		Cup		League Cup		Total	
Season	Club	League	Apps	Goals	Apps	Goals	Apps	Goals	Apps	Goals
Brazil			League		Copa do Brasil		League Cup		Total	
1998	Ponte Preta	Série A	10	0					10	0
1999	Ponte Preta	Série A	17	0					17	0
2000	Ponte Preta	Série A	5	0					5	0
2001	Ponte Preta	Série A	19	0					19	0
2002	Ponte Preta	Série A	23	0					23	0
2003	Ponte Preta	Série A	32	0					32	0
Japan			League		Emperor's Cup		J.League Cup		Total	
2004	Avispa Fukuoka	J2 League	30	2	2	2	-		32	4
2005	Avispa Fukuoka	J2 League	36	3	0	0	-		36	3
2006	Avispa Fukuoka	J1 League	31	0	1	1	3	0	35	1
2007	Oita Trinita	J1 League	11	0	1	0	0	0	12	0
2008	Oita Trinita	J1 League	29	1	0	0	9	1	38	2
2009	Oita Trinita	J1 League	5	0	0	0	0	0	5	0
2009	Sagan Tosu	J2 League	13	1	1	0	-		14	1
Country	Brazil		106	0					106	0
Country	Japan		155	7	5	3	12	1	172	11
Total			161	7	5	3	12	1	278	11
