= Gláucio (footballer, born 1975) =

Brazilian footballer

Personal information
- Full name: Gláucio de Jesus Carvalho
- Date of birth: 11 November 1975 (age 50)
- Place of birth: São Paulo, Brazil
- Height: 1.73 m (5 ft 8 in)
- Position: Midfielder

Senior career*
Years	Team	Apps	(Gls)
1994	Portuguesa	1	(0)
1995–1997	Feyenoord	10	(3)
1996	→ Flamengo (loan)	8	(2)
1997	→ Excelsior Rotterdam (loan)	12	(6)
1998–2000	América (RJ)		
1999	→ Guarani (loan)	2	(0)
2000–2002	Rayo Vallecano	51	(2)
2002–2003	Corinthians Alagoano		
2003	Al Qadisiya Kuwait		(7)
2004	Internacional	3	(0)
2004–2007	Paulista		
2005–2006	→ Avispa Fukuoka (loan)	44	(19)
2007	São Caetano		
2008	Al-Salmiya		
2008	Paraná Clube		
2009	Vitória	11	(1)
2010	Oeste		

International career
1995	Brazil U-20		
- * Club domestic league appearances and goals

Gláucio de Jesus Carvalho (born 11 November 1975 in São Paulo) is a Brazilian former footballer.

== Football career ==
=== Netherlands and Brazil ===
Gláucio started his career at Portuguesa. He moved to Feyenoord in December 1994. He moved back to Flamengo for 1996 season. He moved back to Netherlands for Excelsior Rotterdam in November 1996. He played his last game in Netherlands for Feyenoord in September 1997. He then returned to Brazil again for Guarani and América (RJ).

=== Spain and Brazil ===
Glaucio played for Rayo Vallecano in La Liga for 2000–01 and 2001–02 season. He then played for Corinthians Alagoano.

=== Brazil and Asia ===
Glaucio moved to Qatari league in September 2003. After a short spell at Internacional and Paulista, he moved to Japan for Avispa Fukuoka in March 2005. He then went back to Paulista, and signed a one-year contract with São Caetano in July 2007. In January 2008, he moved to Al-Salmiya and back to Brazil in July.

Glaucio moved to Oeste from Vitória in 2010 and retired as a professional player in May the same year.

=== International career ===
Gláucio played in 1995 FIFA World Youth Championship.

== Club statistics ==
Club performance			League	
Season	Club	League	Apps	Goals
Brazil			League	
1994	Portuguesa Desportos	Série A	1	0
Netherlands			League	
1994/95	Feyenoord	Eredivisie	9	3
1995/96	Feyenoord	Eredivisie	0	0
Brazil			League	
1996	Flamengo	Série A	8	2
Netherlands			League	
1996/97	Excelsior	Eerste Divisie	12	6
1997/98	Feyenoord	Eredivisie	1	0
Brazil			League	
1998	América	Série C		
1999	Guarani	Série A	2	0
2000	América	Série A		
Spain			League	
2000/01	Rayo Vallecano	La Liga	23	1
2001/02	Rayo Vallecano	La Liga	29	1
Kuwait			League	
2002/03	Qadsia	Premier League		2
2003/04	Qadsia	Premier League		5
Brazil			League	
2004	Internacional	Série A	3	0
2005	Paulista	Série B		
Japan			League	
2005	Avispa Fukuoka	J2 League	37	18
2006	Avispa Fukuoka	J1 League	7	1
Brazil			League	
2006	Paulista	Série B		
2007	Paulista	Série B		
2007	São Caetano	Série B		
Kuwait			League	
2007/08	Al-Salmiya	Premier League		0
Brazil			League	
2008	Paraná	Série B		
2009	Vitória	Série A		
Country	Brazil		14	2
Country	Netherlands		22	9
Country	Spain		52	2
Country	Kuwait			
Country	Japan		44	19
Total			132	39

== Qadsia Stats ==
Club	Season	Kuwait Premier League		Al-Khurafi Cup		Kuwait Crown Prince Cup		Kuwait Emir Cup		Other		Total		
Club	Season	Apps	Goals	Apps	Goals	Apps	Goals	Apps	Goals	Apps	Goals	Apps	Goals	Assist
Qadsia SC	2002–03		2										2	
Qadsia SC	2003–04		5		7		2		1				15	
Career total			7		7		2		1		1		17	
