= 2005 J.League Division 2 =

J.League Division 2
- Season: 2005
- Champions: Kyoto Purple Sanga; 2nd J2 title 2nd D2 title
- Promoted: Kyoto Purple Sanga; Avispa Fukuoka; Ventforet Kofu
- Matches: 264
- Goals: 692 (2.62 per match)
- Top goalscorer: Paulinho (22 goals total)
- Highest attendance: 20,841 (Round 42, Avispa vs. Vortis)
- Lowest attendance: 1,344 (Round 35, Thespa vs. Ventforet)
- Average attendance: 7,482

The 2005 J.League Division 2 season was the 34th season of the second-tier club football in Japan and the 7th season since the establishment of J2 League.

In this season, two additional clubs joined from the third-tier Japan Football League, though the number of participating clubs stayed at twelve, as no teams were relegated from 2004 J1 League to replace the two promoted clubs. The clubs competed in the quadruple round-robin format for the top two promotion slots. The third placed-finisher participated in the Pro/Rele Series for the promotion. There was no relegation to the third-tier Japan Football League.

== General ==
=== Promotion and relegation ===
To be completed

=== Changes in competition formats ===
To be completed

=== Changes in clubs ===
To be completed

== Clubs ==
Locations of the 2005 J.League 2 teams

The following twelve clubs played in J.League Division 2 during the 2005 season. Thespa Kusatsu and Tokushima Vortis newly joined the J.League Division 2 from Japan Football League. Due to expansion of J.League Division 1, there was no relegated club from 2004 J1 League. Since Tokushima is based in Shikoku, it became the first season for J.League being presented on all four major islands of Japan, Hokkaidō, Honshū, Kyūshū, and Shikoku.

- Consadole Sapporo
- Vegalta Sendai
- Montedio Yamagata
- Mito HollyHocks
- Thespa Kusatsu
- Yokohama FC
- Shonan Bellmare
- Ventforet Kofu
- Kyoto Purple Sanga
- Tokushima Vortis
- Avispa Fukuoka
- Sagan Tosu

== League format ==
Twelve clubs play in a quadruple round-robin format, a total of 44 games each. A club receives 3 points for a win, 1 point for a tie, and 0 points for a loss. The clubs are ranked by points, and tie breakers are, in the following order:

- Goal differential
- Goals scored
- Head-to-head results

A draw would be conducted, if necessary. However, if two clubs are tied at the first place, both clubs will be declared as the champions. The top two clubs will be promoted to J1, while the 3rd placed club plays a two-legged Promotion/relegation series.

Changes from Previous Year

None

== Final league table ==
| Pos | Team | Pld | W | D | L | GF | GA | GD | Pts | Promotion |
|---|---|---|---|---|---|---|---|---|---|---|
| 1 | Kyoto Purple Sanga (C, P) | 44 | 30 | 7 | 7 | 89 | 40 | +49 | 97 | Promotion to 2006 J.League Division 1 |
| 2 | Avispa Fukuoka (P) | 44 | 21 | 15 | 8 | 72 | 43 | +29 | 78 | Promotion to 2006 J.League Division 1 |
| 3 | Ventforet Kofu (P) | 44 | 19 | 12 | 13 | 78 | 64 | +14 | 69 | Promotion to 2006 J.League Division 1 |
| 4 | Vegalta Sendai | 44 | 19 | 11 | 14 | 66 | 47 | +19 | 68 | |
| 5 | Montedio Yamagata | 44 | 16 | 16 | 12 | 54 | 45 | +9 | 64 | |
| 6 | Consadole Sapporo | 44 | 17 | 12 | 15 | 54 | 57 | −3 | 63 | |
| 7 | Shonan Bellmare | 44 | 13 | 15 | 16 | 46 | 59 | −13 | 54 | |
| 8 | Sagan Tosu | 44 | 14 | 10 | 20 | 58 | 58 | 0 | 52 | |
| 9 | Tokushima Vortis | 44 | 12 | 16 | 16 | 60 | 76 | −16 | 52 | |
| 10 | Mito HollyHock | 44 | 13 | 13 | 18 | 41 | 57 | −16 | 52 | |
| 11 | Yokohama FC | 44 | 10 | 15 | 19 | 48 | 64 | −16 | 45 | |
| 12 | Thespa Kusatsu | 44 | 5 | 8 | 31 | 26 | 82 | −56 | 23 | |

Updated to match(es) played on December 3, 2005. Source: J. League Division 2
Rules for classification: 1) points; 2) goal difference; 3) number of goals scored.
(C) Champions; (P) Promoted

== Final results ==
Rounds 1 & 2
| Home \ Away | SAN | AVI | VEN | VEG | MON | CON | BEL | SAG | VOR | HOL | YFC | SPA |
|---|---|---|---|---|---|---|---|---|---|---|---|---|
| Kyoto Purple Sanga | | 3–2 | 3–2 | 1–0 | 2–1 | 0–0 | 2–1 | 0–3 | 1–0 | 1–1 | 1–0 | 3–0 |
| Avispa Fukuoka | 0–0 | | 0–1 | 2–1 | 0–0 | 0–3 | 0–0 | 3–2 | 3–1 | 4–1 | 1–0 | 4–2 |
| Ventforet Kofu | 0–3 | 2–1 | | 1–1 | 1–1 | 2–2 | 2–2 | 3–1 | 5–0 | 4–1 | 0–1 | 4–1 |
| Vegalta Sendai | 3–1 | 0–2 | 2–1 | | 0–1 | 4–0 | 3–0 | 0–2 | 0–3 | 1–0 | 3–4 | 4–0 |
| Montedio Yamagata | 1–3 | 0–0 | 3–1 | 0–0 | | 3–0 | 1–1 | 1–3 | 2–2 | 0–1 | 1–1 | 1–1 |
| Consadole Sapporo | 0–1 | 1–1 | 3–1 | 0–3 | 0–2 | | 0–0 | 0–1 | 0–0 | 2–0 | 1–0 | 3–1 |
| Shonan Bellmare | 1–2 | 0–2 | 1–0 | 1–0 | 2–1 | 0–3 | | 4–3 | 1–1 | 3–1 | 2–0 | 1–1 |
| Sagan Tosu | 2–3 | 1–1 | 2–2 | 1–0 | 0–2 | 0–1 | 0–0 | | 1–1 | 0–1 | 0–0 | 0–1 |
| Tokushima Vortis | 1–2 | 2–2 | 1–1 | 3–3 | 1–1 | 1–1 | 2–3 | 2–2 | | 0–1 | 2–0 | 2–1 |
| Mito HollyHock | 2–3 | 0–0 | 1–0 | 2–2 | 1–2 | 2–0 | 4–1 | 0–1 | 1–2 | | 2–2 | 1–0 |
| Yokohama FC | 1–2 | 1–1 | 1–3 | 1–3 | 1–1 | 1–2 | 0–0 | 2–2 | 1–1 | 0–0 | | 1–0 |
| Thespa Kusatsu | 0–3 | 1–2 | 1–2 | 0–2 | 0–3 | 1–4 | 1–0 | 0–2 | 2–0 | 1–1 | 1–1 | |

Updated to match(es) played on July 17, 2005. Source: J. League Division 2
Legend: Blue = home team win; Yellow = draw; Red = away team win.

Rounds 3 & 4
| Home \ Away | SAN | AVI | VEN | VEG | MON | CON | BEL | SAG | VOR | HOL | YFC | SPA |
|---|---|---|---|---|---|---|---|---|---|---|---|---|
| Kyoto Purple Sanga | | 3–0 | 1–2 | 3–1 | 0–1 | 4–0 | 4–0 | 0–1 | 2–0 | 3–1 | 2–1 | 6–0 |
| Avispa Fukuoka | 2–1 | | 2–2 | 1–1 | 0–2 | 3–0 | 2–0 | 4–1 | 0–0 | 3–0 | 3–0 | 1–0 |
| Ventforet Kofu | 1–2 | 0–5 | | 2–1 | 1–1 | 0–1 | 5–2 | 1–1 | 5–0 | 2–2 | 0–0 | 1–0 |
| Vegalta Sendai | 0–1 | 2–2 | 1–0 | | 0–0 | 2–2 | 2–0 | 1–0 | 2–2 | 3–0 | 0–0 | 1–0 |
| Montedio Yamagata | 0–3 | 1–1 | 1–2 | 0–2 | | 1–0 | 1–1 | 1–0 | 1–3 | 3–0 | 2–2 | 4–0 |
| Consadole Sapporo | 3–3 | 1–3 | 2–4 | 2–1 | 3–1 | | 2–0 | 0–3 | 2–0 | 1–1 | 1–2 | 2–1 |
| Shonan Bellmare | 0–0 | 1–2 | 1–1 | 1–1 | 2–0 | 0–0 | | 2–0 | 1–2 | 1–1 | 1–2 | 1–0 |
| Sagan Tosu | 3–2 | 1–1 | 1–2 | 2–0 | 1–2 | 0–2 | 1–2 | | 3–3 | 1–2 | 4–1 | 4–1 |
| Tokushima Vortis | 1–5 | 2–0 | 1–3 | 2–4 | 2–1 | 1–1 | 3–1 | 2–1 | | 0–1 | 1–3 | 3–2 |
| Mito HollyHock | 1–1 | 0–3 | 3–0 | 0–2 | 0–1 | 1–0 | 0–1 | 1–0 | 1–1 | | 1–0 | 1–1 |
| Yokohama FC | 1–1 | 3–1 | 3–4 | 1–2 | 1–2 | 1–1 | 1–4 | 0–1 | 2–3 | 1–0 | | 1–0 |
| Thespa Kusatsu | 0–2 | 0–2 | 1–2 | 0–2 | 0–0 | 1–2 | 0–0 | 1–0 | 1–0 | 0–0 | 1–3 | |

Updated to match(es) played on December 3, 2005. Source: J. League Division 2
Legend: Blue = home team win; Yellow = draw; Red = away team win.

== Top scorers ==
| Pos | Scorer | Club | Goals |
|---|---|---|---|
| 1 | (Brazil) Paulinho | Kyoto Purple Sanga | 22 |
| 2 | (Brazil) Baré | Ventforet Kofu | 21 |
| 3 | (Brazil) Gláucio | Avispa Fukuoka | 18 |
| 4 | (Japan) Tatsunori Arai | Sagan Tosu | 17 |
| 4 | (Japan) Taro Hasegawa | Ventforet Kofu | 17 |
| 6 | (Brazil) Alemão | Kyoto Purple Sanga | 15 |
| 6 | (Japan) Michiaki Kakimoto | Shonan Bellmare | 15 |
| 6 | (Japan) Takaaki Suzuki | Sagan Tosu | 15 |
| 9 | (Brazil) Baron | Vegalta Sendai | 14 |
| 10 | (Brazil) Schwenck | Vegalta Sendai | 13 |

== Attendance figures ==
| Pos | Team | Total | High | Low | Average | Change |
|---|---|---|---|---|---|---|
| 1 | Vegalta Sendai | 350,544 | 19,128 | 11,695 | 15,934 | −1.6% |
| 2 | Consadole Sapporo | 244,935 | 20,374 | 4,959 | 11,133 | +17.6% |
| 3 | Avispa Fukuoka | 237,299 | 20,841 | 6,620 | 10,786 | +23.4% |
| 4 | Kyoto Purple Sanga | 172,846 | 14,170 | 4,221 | 7,857 | +0.6% |
| 5 | Sagan Tosu | 172,816 | 13,039 | 4,467 | 7,855 | +117.6% |
| 6 | Ventforet Kofu | 152,491 | 14,234 | 4,903 | 6,931 | +8.8% |
| 7 | Montedio Yamagata | 130,867 | 19,418 | 1,647 | 5,949 | −7.3% |
| 8 | Yokohama FC | 130,644 | 12,849 | 2,863 | 5,938 | +40.7% |
| 9 | Shonan Bellmare | 126,416 | 14,203 | 3,521 | 5,746 | +22.5% |
| 10 | Tokushima Vortis | 96,045 | 8,226 | 2,205 | 4,366 | +43.3%^{†} |
| 11 | Thespa Kusatsu | 87,098 | 7,314 | 1,344 | 3,959 | −20.0%^{†} |
| 12 | Mito HollyHock | 73,339 | 8,158 | 1,371 | 3,334 | −11.6% |
| | League total | 1,975,340 | 20,841 | 1,344 | 7,482 | +3.7% |

Updated to games played on December 3, 2005
Source: J. League Division 2
Notes:
^{†} Team played previous season in JFL.
