= Yasuomi Kugisaki =

Japanese footballer

Personal information
- Date of birth: May 3, 1982 (age 44)
- Place of birth: Miyazaki, Japan
- Height: 1.76 m (5 ft 9 1/2 in)
- Position: Defender

Youth career
- 2001–2004: Tokai University

Senior career*
Years	Team	Apps	(Gls)
2004	Tokai FC Wings		
2005–2009	Avispa Fukuoka	27	(0)
2010–2014	Honda Lock	76	(6)
Total		103	(6)
- * Club domestic league appearances and goals

Yasuomi Kugisaki (釘﨑 康臣, Kugisaki Yasuomi; born May 3, 1982) is a former Japanese football player.

== Club statistics ==
Club performance			League		Cup		League Cup		Total	
Season	Club	League	Apps	Goals	Apps	Goals	Apps	Goals	Apps	Goals
Japan			League		Emperor's Cup		J.League Cup		Total	
2005	Avispa Fukuoka	J2 League	4	0	2	0	-		6	0
2006	Avispa Fukuoka	J1 League	1	0	1	0	0	0	2	0
2007	Avispa Fukuoka	J2 League	6	0	0	0	-		6	0
2008	Avispa Fukuoka	J2 League	0	0	0	0	-		0	0
2009	Avispa Fukuoka	J2 League	16	0	0	0	-		16	0
2010	Honda Lock	Football League								
Country	Japan		27	0	3	0	0	0	30	0
Total			27	0	3	0	0	0	30	0
