= 2012 Avispa Fukuoka season =

Avispa Fukuoka
2012 season
- Chairman: Tadashi Otsuka
- Manager: Koji Maeda
- J.League Division 2: 18th
- Emperor's Cup: Third round
- Top goalscorer: League: Hisashi Jogo (12); All: Hisashi Jogo (14)
- Highest home attendance: 10,902 vs Yokohama (30 September 2012)
- Lowest home attendance: 2,277 vs Fukuoka University (9 September 2012)
- Biggest win: 4–0 v Gainare Tottori (25 March 2012); 0–4 v Tokushima Vortis (22 April 2012)
- Biggest defeat: 0–3 v Thespa Kusatsu (29 July 2012)
Home colours	Away colours

The 2012 Avispa Fukuoka season sees Avispa Fukuoka return to J.League Division 2 after spending 2011 in J1. This is their non-consecutive 13th season in the second tier since 1991. Avispa Fukuoka are also competing in the 2012 Emperor's Cup.

== Players ==
Note: Flags indicate national team as defined under FIFA eligibility rules; some limited exceptions apply. Players may hold more than one non-FIFA nationality.

No.	Pos.	Nation	Player
1	GK	JPN	Ryuichi Kamiyama
2	DF	KOR	Kim Min-je
3	MF	JPN	Ryu Okada (on loan from Júbilo Iwata)
4	DF	JPN	Takumi Wada
5	DF	JPN	Masahiro Koga
6	DF	JPN	Kazuki Yamaguchi
7	MF	JPN	Toshiya Sueyoshi
8	MF	JPN	Jun Suzuki
9	FW	BRA	Samir
10	FW	JPN	Hisashi Jogo
11	FW	JPN	Yutaka Takahashi
13	DF	JPN	Shogo Kobara
14	MF	JPN	Masakazu Kihara (on loan from Omiya Ardija)
15	FW	JPN	Daisuke Sakata

No.	Pos.	Nation	Player
16	FW	JPN	Daisuke Ishizu
17	DF	KOR	Oh Chang-Hyun
18	FW	JPN	Go Nishida
19	MF	JPN	Sho Naruoka
20	DF	JPN	Yosuke Miyaji
21	DF	JPN	Hiroyuki Omata
22	DF	JPN	Kosuke Yatsuda
23	GK	JPN	Kohei Kawata
24	FW	JPN	Masato Yoshihara
25	GK	JPN	Eita Kasagawa
26	MF	PRK	Son Jeong-ryun
27	DF	JPN	Tokio Hatamoto
28	MF	JPN	Taku Ushinohama
29	DF	JPN	Shunsuke Tsutsumi (on loan from Urawa Reds)
39	FW	BRA	Osmar

== Competitions ==
=== J.League ===
==== League table ====
Pos	Team	Pld	W	D	L	GF	GA	GD	Pts
16	Ehime FC	42	12	14	16	47	46	+1	50
17	Thespa Kusatsu	42	12	11	19	31	45	−14	47
18	Avispa Fukuoka	42	9	14	19	53	68	−15	41
19	Kataller Toyama	42	9	11	22	38	59	−21	38
20	Gainare Tottori	42	11	5	26	33	78	−45	38

Updated to match(es) played on 11 November 2012. Source: J.League Division 2
Rules for classification: 1st points; 2nd goal differential; 3rd goals scored; 4th head-to-head results; 5th disciplinary points; 6th draw. If two clubs are tied for first place, both clubs will be declared champions.

==== Matches ====
Win Draw Loss

4 March 2012 1	Avispa Fukuoka	2–1	Roasso Kumamoto	LEVEL-5 Stadium
Sunday 15:05	Sakata 21'; Jogo 25'	Report	56' Taketomi	Attendance: 7,379; Referee: Onishi

11 March 2012 2	Machida Zelvia	0–1	Avispa Fukuoka	Komazawa Olympic Park Stadium
Sunday 13:04		Report	27' Suzuki	Attendance: 4,286; Referee: Iemoto

17 March 2012 3	Shonan Bellmare	3–1	Avispa Fukuoka	Shonan BMW Stadium Hiratsuka
Saturday 16:04	Endo 44'; Iwakami 63'; Baba 90+2'	Report	84' Sakata	Attendance: 3,602; Referee: Nakamura

20 March 2012 4	Avispa Fukuoka	0–0	JEF United Chiba	LEVEL-5 Stadium
Tuesday 13:03		Report		Attendance: 5,069; Referee: Hirose

25 March 2012 5	Avispa Fukuoka	4–0	Gainare Tottori	LEVEL-5 Stadium
Sunday 13:00	Sakata 27', 41'; Sueyoshi 46'; Takahashi 51'	Report		Attendance: 4,017; Referee: Imamura

1 April 2012 6	Kyoto Sanga	3–2	Avispa Fukuoka	Nishikyogoku Athletic Stadium
14:00	Kudo 6'; Someya (yellow card) 19'; Ando (yellow card) 34'; Fukumura (yellow card) 37'; Nagasawa 50'; Miyayoshi 58'	Report	Tsutsumi 20'; Takahashi 45'; Sueyoshi (yellow card) 72'; Oh Chan-Hyon (yellow card) 76'	Attendance: 7,224; Referee: Yoshiro Imamura

8 April 2012 7	Ehime	4–2	Avispa Fukuoka	Ningineer Stadium
14:00	Arita 3', 46'; Urata 42' (yellow card) 49'; Sonoda (yellow card) 43'; Akai 61'	Report	Narouka 8', 83'; Kobara (yellow card) 39'; Oh Chan-Hyon (yellow card) 45+1'	Attendance: 3,035; Referee: Hajime Matsuo

15 April 2012 8	Avispa Fukuoka	1–1	Mito HollyHock	LEVEL-5 Stadium
17:00	Sakata 5'; Suzuki (yellow card) 11'; Naruoka (yellow card) 17'; Tokio Hatamoto (yellow card) 31'; Kim Min-Je (yellow card) 69' (yellow-red card) 90+2'	Report	Nishioka (yellow card) 48'; Ozawa 65'; Hashimoto (yellow card) 88'	Attendance: 4,878; Referee: (Japan) Naohito Ogawa

22 April 2012 9	Tokushima Vortis	0–4	Avispa Fukuoka	Pocarisweat Stadium
19:00		Report	Omata (yellow card) 31'; Jogo 45'; Naruoka 64', 66'; Kihara 80'	Attendance: 2,103; Referee: (Japan) Takuto Okabe

27 April 2012 10	Avispa Fukuoka	1–3	Tokyo Verdy	LEVEL-5 Stadium
20:00	Sakata 64'	Report	Abe 22'; Takahashi 53', 86' (yellow card) 90+7'; Mori (yellow card) 69'; Maki (yellow card) 90+1'	Attendance: 3,262; Referee: (Japan) Nobutsugu Murakami

30 April 2012 11	Ventforet Kofu	1–1	Avispa Fukuoka	Yamanashi Chuo Bank Stadium
17:00	Choi Sung-Kuen (yellow card) 39'; Davi (yellow card) 43' (goal) 47'; Yamamoto (yellow card) 82'	Report	Sakata 34'; Kihara (yellow card) 85'; Suzuki (yellow card) 88'	Attendance: 10,070; Referee: (Japan) Koichiro Fukushima

3 May 2012 12	Avispa Fukuoka	1–1	Oita Trinita	LEVEL-5 Stadium
14:00	Jogo 44'; Koga (yellow card) 53'; Tokio Hatamoto (yellow card) 56'; Kim Min-Je (yellow card) 79'; Sueyoshi (yellow card) 87'	Report	Sakata 39'; Mitsuhira (yellow card) 39'; Yu Yasukawa (yellow card) 60'	Attendance: 7,637; Referee: (Japan) Hajime Matsuo

6 May 2012 13	Tochigi SC	2–0	Avispa Fukuoka	Tochigi Green Stadium
14:30	Onodera (yellow card) 28'; Cha Young-Hwan 48'; Hirose 73'	Report	Tokio Hatamoto (yellow card) 68'	Attendance: 1,984; Referee: (Japan) Hiroshi Yamauchi

13 May 2012 14	Avispa Fukuoka	1–1	Montedio Yamagata	LEVEL-5 Stadium
14:00	Jogo 54'	Report	Akiba 17'	Attendance: 4,040; Referee: (Japan) Masaaki Iemoto

20 May 2012 15	Kataller Toyama	0–1	Avispa Fukuoka	Toyama Athletic Stadium
14:00	Seo Yong-Duk (yellow card) 85'	Report	Naruoka (yellow card) 36'; Jogo 88'	Attendance: 2,978; Referee: (Japan) Nobutsugu Murakami

27 May 2012 16	Avispa Fukuoka	1–1	Fagiano Okayama	LEVEL-5 Stadium
14:00	Takeda 32' (o.g.)	Report	Tadokoro 44'	Attendance: 4,090; Referee: (Japan) Naohito Ogawa

2 June 2012 17	Thespa Kusatsu	1–0	Avispa Fukuoka	Shoda Shoyu Stadium Gunma
16:00	Mikuriya 34'; Endo (yellow card) 59'	Report		Attendance: 2,616; Referee: (Japan) Itaru Hirose

9 June 2012 18	Avispa Fukuoka	1–0	Giravanz Kitakyushu	LEVEL-5 Stadium
14:00	Omata (yellow card) 26'; Jogo 41'; Koga (yellow card) 57'; Suzuki (yellow card) 83'; Naruoka (yellow card) 90+3'	Report	Kimura (yellow card) 16'	Attendance: 8,741; Referee: (Japan) Shoichiro Mikami

13 June 2012 19	Matsumoto Yamaga	2–2	Avispa Fukuoka	Matsumotodaira Football Stadium
20:00	Shiozawa 8'; Tetsuya Kijima 70' (yellow card) 71'	Report	Jogo 16', 80'; Okada (yellow card) 32'; Kamiyama (yellow card) 65'; Kobara (yellow card) 69'; Suzuki (yellow card) 83'	Attendance: 7,111; Referee: (Japan) Hiromichi Oka

17 June 2012 20	Avispa Fukuoka	0–0	FC Gifu	LEVEL-5 Stadium
19:00	Tsutsumi (yellow card) 51'; Koga (yellow card) 63'	Report	Kohei Nakajima (yellow card) 90+2'	Attendance: 3,509; Referee: (Japan) Yosuke Kubota

24 June 2012 21	Yokohama	1–1	Avispa Fukuoka	Nippatsu Mitsuzawa Stadium
19:00	Kaio 24' (pen.)	Report	Kamiyama (yellow card) 45+2'; Suzuki (yellow card) 61'; Takahashi 74'; Kobara (yellow card) 90'	Attendance: 8,436; Referee: (Japan) Masuya Ueda

1 July 2012 22	Avispa Fukuoka	1–0	Ehime	LEVEL-5 Stadium
19:00	Jogo 26'; Suzuki (yellow card) 30'; Koga (yellow card) 82'	Report	Tamori (yellow card) 68'; Ishii (yellow card) 85'	Attendance: 3,487; Referee: (Paraguay) Antonio Arias

8 July 2012 23	Avispa Fukuoka	1–3	Tokushima Vortis	LEVEL-5 Stadium
19:00	Sakata 35' (pen.); Kobara (yellow card) 73'	Report	Hashiuchi 15'; Douglas (yellow card) 16' (goal) 71'; Nishijima (yellow card) 34'; Diogo 52'; Oh Seung-Hoon (yellow card) 55'; Nasukawa (yellow card) 88'	Attendance: 5,061; Referee: (Japan) Kenji Ogiya

15 July 2012 24	Montedio Yamagata	3–1	Avispa Fukuoka	ND Soft Stadium Yamagata
20:00	Ishii 39'; Akiba 50'; Funayama 58'	Report	Sakata (yellow card) 38'; Tsutsumi (yellow card) 45+2'; Okada (yellow card) 64'; Kihara 80'	Attendance: 11,275; Referee: (Japan) Futoshi Nakamura

22 July 2012 25	Mito HollyHock	4–2	Avispa Fukuoka	K's denki Stadium Mito
19:00	Okamoto 57', 82'; Frank 62'; Hashimoto 68'	Report	Jogo 9'; Kobara 87'	Attendance: 3,224; Referee: (Japan) Kazuyoshi Enomoto

29 July 2012 26	Avispa Fukuoka	0–3	Thespa Kusatsu	LEVEL-5 Stadium
19:00	Suzuki (yellow card) 66'; Kihara (yellow card) 90'	Report	Kobayashi 51'; Heberty 57'; Satoru Hoshino (yellow card) 69'; Alex Rafael 81'	Attendance: 6,037; Referee: (Japan) Tetsuro Yoshida

5 August 2012 27	FC Gifu	0–3	Avispa Fukuoka	Gifu Nagaragawa Stadium
19:00	Someya (yellow card) 71'	Report	Nishida 28', 84'; Koga (yellow card) 56'; Suzuki 76'	Attendance: 8,492; Referee: (Japan) Itaru Hirose

12 August 2012 28	Avispa Fukuoka	1–3	Shonan Bellmare	LEVEL-5 Stadium
19:00	Jogo 32'	Report	Kaoru Takayama 3'; Kikuchi 15'; Kobayashi 66'	Attendance: 7,009; Referee: (Japan) Masaaki Iemoto

19 August 2012 29	Giravanz Kitakyushu	4–2	Avispa Fukuoka	Honjō Athletic Stadium
19:00	Ikemoto 8'; Hanato 15', 56' 90+4'; Tokiwa 90+4'	Summary	Jogo (yellow card) 7' (goal) 45+1'; Wada (yellow card) 85'; Suzuki 90+2'	Attendance: 7,637; Referee: (Japan) Ryuji Sato

22 August 2012 30	Avispa Fukuoka	3–2	Kataller Toyama	LEVEL-5 Stadium
20:00	Yamaguchi (yellow card) 35'; Osmar 67'; Okada (yellow card) 80'; Daisuke Ishizu 82', 89'	Summary	Seo Yong-Duk 7'; Asuke (yellow card) 10'; Kurobe (yellow card) 14'; Kokeguchi 77'	Attendance: 3,282; Referee: (Japan) Kazuyuki Hayakawa

26 August 2012 31	Avispa Fukuoka	2–2	Matsumoto Yamaga	LEVEL-5 Stadium
20:00	Naruoka 24' (yellow card) 70'; Osmar (yellow card) 49' (goal) 90+4'; Jogo (yellow card) 52'	Summary	Shiozawa 25', 60'; Kusunose (yellow card) 54'	Attendance: 6,576; Referee: (Japan) Haruki Hidaka

2 September 2012 32	JEF United	2–1	Avispa Fukuoka	Fukuda Denshi Arena
20:00	Satō (yellow card) 29'; Hyodo 57'; Arata 65'	Summary	Kim Min-Je (yellow card) 25'; Yamaguchi (yellow card) 56'; Suzuki (yellow card) 73'; Kihara 82'	Attendance: 7,194; Referee: (Japan) Yosuke Kubota

14 September 2012 33	Tokyo Verdy	1–1	Avispa Fukuoka	Ajinomoto Stadium
20:00	Takahashi (yellow card) 22'; Mori (yellow card) 67'; Shoya Nakajima 83'	Summary	Kim Min-Je (yellow card) 8'; Koga 20'; Yamaguchi (yellow card) 29'; Oscar (yellow card) 37'	Attendance: 2,875; Referee: (Japan) Takuto Okabe

17 September 2012 34	Avispa Fukuoka	1–1	Machida Zelvia	LEVEL-5 Stadium
20:00	Oscar 14'	Report	Sonoda (yellow card) 23'; Dimić 26'; Suzuki (yellow card) 47'	Attendance: 3,092; Referee: (Japan) Yudai Yamamoto

23 September 2012 35	Roasso Kumamoto	3–1	Avispa Fukuoka	Kumamoto Athletics Stadium
16:00	Takahashi 2'; Hideaki Kitajima 45+1', 63'; Fujimoto (yellow card) 45+2'	Summary	Osmar 23'; Takahashi (yellow card) 64'	Attendance: 8,152; Referee: (Japan) Tomoya Maeda

30 September 2012 36	Avispa Fukuoka	1–1	Yokohama	LEVEL-5 Stadium
16:00	Suzuki (yellow card) 23'; Yamaguchi (yellow card) 38'; Naruoka 49'	Summary	Kaio 90'	Attendance: 10,902; Referee: (Japan) Tetsuro Yoshida

6 October 2012 37	Fagiano Okayama	2–1	Avispa Fukuoka	Kanko Stadium
15:00	Kawamata 3', 28'; Kim Min-Kyun (yellow card) 56'	Summary	Jogo 53'	Attendance: 3,946; Referee: (Japan) Masuya Ueda

14 October 2012 38	Avispa Fukuoka	1–1	Tochigi SC	LEVEL-5 Stadium
20:00	Sueyoshi (yellow card) 15'; Osmar (yellow card) 27'; Daisuke Ishizu 52'; Omata (yellow card) 90+1'	Summary	Sabia 16'; Cha Young-Hwan (yellow card) 80'	Attendance: 3,721; Referee: (Japan) Taku Nagaya

21 October 2012 39	Avispa Fukuoka	2–3	Ventforet Kofu	LEVEL-5 Stadium
14:00	Suzuki (yellow card) 12'; Osmar 27'; Sueyoshi (yellow card) 30'; Koga (yellow card) 34'; Morita 59' (o.g.); Kim Min-Je (yellow card) 67'; Yamaguchi (yellow card) 71'; Tsutsumi (yellow card) 86'	Summary	Davi 22', 29'; Nagasato 44'; Fukuda (yellow card) 77'; Fernandinho (yellow card) 87'	Attendance: 6,144; Referee: (Japan) Yoshiro Imamura

28 October 2012 40	Oita Trinita	1–0	Avispa Fukuoka	Ōita Bank Dome
15:00	Tokita (yellow card) 25'; Morishima 67'	Summary	Osmar (yellow card) 61'; Naruoka (yellow card) 65'	Attendance: 10,617; Referee: (Japan) Eiji Kawai

4 November 2012 41	Avispa Fukuoka	0–2	Kyoto Sanga	LEVEL-5 Stadium
16:00	Yamaguchi (yellow card) 42'; Sueyoshi (yellow card) 76'	Summary	Komai 23'; Nakamura 46'	Attendance: 9,376; Referee: (Japan) Koichiro Fukushima

11 November 2012 42	Gainare Tottori	2–1	Avispa Fukuoka	Tottori Bank Bird Stadium
13:00	Tsurumi 8'; Kubo (yellow card) 28'; Yoshino 90'	Summary	Nishida 1'; Okada (red card) 62'; Suzuki (yellow card) 66'	Attendance: 4,069; Referee: (Japan) Kenji Ogiya

=== Emperor's Cup ===
Win Draw Loss

9 September 2012 Round 2	Avispa Fukuoka	4–2	Fukuoka University	Fukuoka
13:00	Jogo 7', 43'; Osmar 59'; Samir 71'	Report	Akira 41'; Kishida 75'	Stadium: Level-5 Stadium; Attendance: 2,277; Referee: Naohito Ogawa

10 October 2012 Round 3	Omiya Ardija	3–1	Avispa Fukuoka	Ōmiya-ku, Saitama
19:00	Hasegawa 45'; Ljubijankič 54'; Novaković 87'	Report	Osmar 66'	Stadium: NACK5 Stadium Omiya; Attendance: 1,212; Referee: Toshimitsu Yoshida
