= 2010 Avispa Fukuoka season =

Avispa Fukuoka
2010 season
- Manager: Yoshiyuki Shinoda
- Stadium: Level-5 Stadium
- J. League 2: 3rd
- Emperor's Cup: Quarterfinals
- Top goalscorer: Genki Nagasato (15)

2010 Avispa Fukuoka season

== Competitions ==
Competitions	Position
J. League 2	3rd / 19 clubs
Emperor's Cup	Quarterfinals

== Player statistics ==
No.	Pos.	Player	D.o.B. (Age)	Height / Weight	J. League 2		Emperor's Cup		Total	
No.	Pos.	Player	D.o.B. (Age)	Height / Weight	Apps	Goals	Apps	Goals	Apps	Goals
1	GK	Ryuichi Kamiyama	November 10, 1984 (aged 25)	cm / kg	28	0				
2	DF	Kazuki Yamaguchi	October 7, 1986 (aged 23)	cm / kg	1	0				
3	DF	Tatsunori Yamagata	October 4, 1983 (aged 26)	cm / kg	31	1				
4	MF	Shu Abe	June 7, 1984 (aged 25)	cm / kg	3	0				
5	DF	Makoto Tanaka	August 8, 1975 (aged 34)	cm / kg	30	2				
6	DF	Daiki Niwa	January 16, 1986 (aged 24)	cm / kg	35	1				
7	MF	Kiyokazu Kudo	June 21, 1974 (aged 35)	cm / kg	32	2				
8	MF	Jun Suzuki	April 22, 1989 (aged 20)	cm / kg	24	1				
9	FW	Yutaka Takahashi	September 29, 1980 (aged 29)	cm / kg	22	4				
10	MF	Hisashi Jogo	April 16, 1986 (aged 23)	cm / kg	21	8				
11	FW	Yūsuke Tanaka	February 3, 1986 (aged 24)	cm / kg	23	5				
13	DF	Tomokazu Nagira	October 17, 1985 (aged 24)	cm / kg	11	0				
14	MF	Genki Nagasato	December 16, 1985 (aged 24)	cm / kg	35	15				
15	MF	Kosuke Nakamachi	September 1, 1985 (aged 24)	cm / kg	35	10				
16	FW	Hideya Okamoto	May 18, 1987 (aged 22)	cm / kg	35	3				
17	DF	Takanori Nakajima	February 9, 1984 (aged 26)	cm / kg	30	0				
18	FW	Masato Yoshihara	October 27, 1991 (aged 18)	cm / kg	4	0				
19	FW	Tetsuya Ōkubo	March 9, 1980 (aged 29)	cm / kg	36	9				
20	DF	Yōsuke Miyaji	June 12, 1987 (aged 22)	cm / kg	17	0				
21	FW	Kyohei Oyama	May 22, 1989 (aged 20)	cm / kg	5	0				
22	MF	Toshiya Sueyoshi	November 18, 1987 (aged 22)	cm / kg	31	1				
23	GK	Yuji Rokutan	April 10, 1987 (aged 22)	cm / kg	8	0				
24	DF	Kenta Hiraishi	June 26, 1985 (aged 24)	cm / kg	3	0				
25	GK	Eita Kasagawa	October 25, 1990 (aged 19)	cm / kg	0	0				
26	DF	Son Jeong-ryun	September 18, 1991 (aged 18)	cm / kg	0	0				
27	DF	Lee Jong-min	May 21, 1987 (aged 22)	cm / kg	2	0				

== Other pages ==
- (in Japanese) J. League official site
