= 2004 Sanfrecce Hiroshima season =

Sanfrecce Hiroshima
2004 season
- Manager: Takeshi Ono
- Stadium: Hiroshima Big Arch
- J. League 1: 12th
- Emperor's Cup: 4th Round
- J. League Cup: GL-A 3rd
- Top goalscorer: Koji Morisaki (7)
Home colours	Away colours

During the 2004 season, Sanfrecce Hiroshima competed in the J. League 1, in which they finished 12th.

== Competitions ==
Competitions	Position
J. League 1	12th / 16 clubs
Emperor's Cup	4th Round
J. League Cup	GL-A 3rd / 4 clubs

== Domestic results ==
=== J. League 1 ===
J. League 1 match results
Round	Date	Opponent	Venue	Result F–A
1	13 March 2004	Shimizu S-Pulse	Home	1–1
2	20 March 2004	Gamba Osaka	Away	0–1
3	3 April 2004	JEF United Chiba	Home	1–3
4	10 April 2004	Oita Trinita	Away	1–2
5	14 April 2004	Nagoya Grampus	Home	1–1
6	17 April 2004	Tokyo Verdy	Away	0–0
7	2 May 2004	Urawa Red Diamonds	Home	0–0
8	5 May 2004	Cerezo Osaka	Away	2–1
9	9 May 2004	Vissel Kobe	Home	2–0
10	16 May 2004	FC Tokyo	Away	1–1
11	22 May 2004	Kashiwa Reysol	Home	3–0
12	13 June 2004	Kashima Antlers	Home	0–2
13	16 June 2004	Yokohama F. Marinos	Away	0–2
14	19 June 2004	Albirex Niigata	Home	1–1
15	26 June 2004	Júbilo Iwata	Away	2–4
16	14 August 2004	JEF United Chiba	Away	1–2
17	21 August 2004	Cerezo Osaka	Home	2–1
18	29 August 2004	Kashiwa Reysol	Away	2–2
19	11 September 2004	Shimizu S-Pulse	Away	0–3
20	18 September 2004	Yokohama F. Marinos	Home	2–2
21	23 September 2004	Albirex Niigata	Away	2–3
22	26 September 2004	Tokyo Verdy	Home	3–0
23	3 October 2004	Kashima Antlers	Away	0–0
24	17 October 2004	Gamba Osaka	Home	2–2
25	23 October 2004	Vissel Kobe	Away	2–2
26	31 October 2004	FC Tokyo	Home	1–1
27	6 November 2004	Nagoya Grampus	Away	1–2
28	20 November 2004	Júbilo Iwata	Home	3–2
29	23 November 2004	Oita Trinita	Home	0–0
30	28 November 2004	Urawa Red Diamonds	Away	0–1

=== Emperor's Cup ===
Match	Date	Venue	Opponents	Score
4th Round	2004.11	EDION Stadium Hiroshima	Mito HollyHock	3-1
5th Round	2004.12	EDION Stadium Hiroshima	Shimizu S-Pulse	0-3

=== J. League Cup ===
Match	Date	Venue	Opponents	Score
GL-A-1	2004..	[[]]	[[]]	-
GL-A-2	2004..	[[]]	[[]]	-
GL-A-3	2004..	[[]]	[[]]	-
GL-A-4	2004..	[[]]	[[]]	-
GL-A-5	2004..	[[]]	[[]]	-
GL-A-6	2004..	[[]]	[[]]	-

== Player statistics ==
No.	Pos.	Player	D.o.B. (Age)	Height / Weight	J. League 1		Emperor's Cup		J. League Cup		Total	
No.	Pos.	Player	D.o.B. (Age)	Height / Weight	Apps	Goals	Apps	Goals	Apps	Goals	Apps	Goals
1	GK	Takashi Shimoda	November 28, 1975 (aged 28)	cm / kg	30	0						
2	DF	Ricardo	February 23, 1977 (aged 27)	cm / kg	26	0						
3	DF	Norio Omura	September 6, 1969 (aged 34)	cm / kg	25	3						
4	MF	Daisuke Tonoike	January 29, 1975 (aged 29)	cm / kg	7	0						
5	DF	Yūichi Komano	July 25, 1981 (aged 22)	cm / kg	18	1						
6	MF	César Sampaio	March 31, 1968 (aged 35)	cm / kg	14	0						
6	MF	Beto	January 7, 1975 (aged 29)	cm / kg	14	2						
7	MF	Kōji Morisaki	May 9, 1981 (aged 22)	cm / kg	25	7						
8	MF	Kazuyuki Morisaki	May 9, 1981 (aged 22)	cm / kg	28	5						
9	FW	Yasuo Manaka	January 31, 1971 (aged 33)	cm / kg	6	0						
10	FW	Tiago	December 4, 1977 (aged 26)	cm / kg	10	2						
11	FW	Hiroto Mogi	March 2, 1984 (aged 20)	cm / kg	8	1						
13	FW	Koji Matsuura	May 5, 1980 (aged 23)	cm / kg	2	0						
14	MF	Kazuki Sato	June 27, 1974 (aged 29)	cm / kg	3	0						
15	MF	Kazumasa Takagi	December 17, 1984 (aged 19)	cm / kg	2	0						
16	MF	Ri Han-Jae	June 27, 1982 (aged 21)	cm / kg	26	1						
17	MF	Kota Hattori	November 22, 1977 (aged 26)	cm / kg	30	2						
18	DF	Kosuke Yatsuda	March 17, 1982 (aged 21)	cm / kg	3	0						
19	DF	Yusuke Igawa	October 30, 1982 (aged 21)	cm / kg	6	0						
19	DF	Kohei Morita	July 13, 1976 (aged 27)	cm / kg	14	1						
20	FW	Susumu Oki	February 23, 1976 (aged 28)	cm / kg	21	5						
21	FW	Takuto Hayashi	August 9, 1982 (aged 21)	cm / kg	0	0						
22	DF	Yuki Okubo	April 17, 1984 (aged 19)	cm / kg	1	0						
23	FW	Toshiya Tanaka	November 12, 1984 (aged 19)	cm / kg	6	1						
24	FW	Tatsuro Kimura	June 24, 1984 (aged 19)	cm / kg	4	0						
25	DF	Mitsuyuki Yoshihiro	May 4, 1985 (aged 18)	cm / kg	11	0						
26	MF	Yojiro Takahagi	August 2, 1986 (aged 17)	cm / kg	4	1						
27	FW	Genki Nakayama	September 15, 1981 (aged 22)	cm / kg	11	0						
28	DF	Megumu Yoshida	April 13, 1973 (aged 30)	cm / kg	26	0						
29	MF	Hideki Nishimura	April 15, 1983 (aged 20)	cm / kg	0	0						
30	MF	Toshihiro Aoyama	February 22, 1986 (aged 18)	cm / kg	0	0						
31	GK	Masaharu Kawahara	May 30, 1984 (aged 19)	cm / kg	0	0						
32	FW	Yuki Tamura	December 31, 1985 (aged 18)	cm / kg	8	1						
33	GK	Hideaki Ueno	May 31, 1981 (aged 22)	cm / kg	0	0						
34	DF	Shogo Nishikawa	July 1, 1983 (aged 20)	cm / kg	5	0						
34/36	FW	Shunsuke Maeda	June 9, 1986 (aged 17)	cm / kg	11	1						
35	DF	Ryota Moriwaki	April 6, 1986 (aged 17)	cm / kg	0	0						
36	MF	Issei Takayanagi	September 14, 1986 (aged 17)	cm / kg	3	0						

== Other pages ==
- (in Japanese) J. League official site
