= Tatsunori Yamagata =

Japanese footballer

Personal information
- Date of birth: October 4, 1983 (age 43)
- Place of birth: Kitakyushu, Fukuoka, Japan
- Height: 1.72 m (5 ft 7 1/2 in)
- Position: Defender

Youth career
- 1999–2001: Higashi Fukuoka High School

Senior career*
Years	Team	Apps	(Gls)
2002–2003	Albirex Niigata	8	(1)
2004	Albirex Niigata Singapore	12	(1)
2005–2011	Avispa Fukuoka	209	(1)
2012–2016	Tochigi SC	130	(1)
2017	Kataller Toyama	31	(0)
Total		390	(4)
- * Club domestic league appearances and goals

Tatsunori Yamagata (山形 辰徳, Yamagata Tatsunori; born October 4, 1983) is a former Japanese football player. His elder brother Kyohei Yamagata is also a former footballer.

== Playing career ==
Yamagata was born in Kitakyushu on October 4, 1983. After graduating from high school, he joined J2 League club Albirex Niigata in 2002. He played several matches as right side back from first season. In 2004, he moved to Albirex Niigata Singapore. In 2005, he returned to Japan and joined Avispa Fukuoka. His elder brother Kyohei also played for Avispa from 2004 to 2007. Although Yamagata could not play many matches until 2006, he became a regular as right side back in 2007 and Avispa was promoted to J1 League end of 2010 season. However Avispa was returned to J2 in a year end of 2011 season. In 2012, he moved to J2 club Tochigi SC. He played many matches every seasons. However Tochigi finished at the bottom place in 2015 season and was relegated to J3 League. In 2017, he moved to J3 club Kataller Toyama. He retired end of 2017 season.

== Club statistics ==
Club performance			League		Cup		League Cup		Total	
Season	Club	League	Apps	Goals	Apps	Goals	Apps	Goals	Apps	Goals
Japan			League		Emperor's Cup		J.League Cup		Total	
2002	Albirex Niigata	J2 League	2	0	3	1	-		5	1
2003	Albirex Niigata	J2 League	6	1	1	0	-		7	1
Total			8	1	4	1	-		12	2
Singapore			League		Singapore Cup		League Cup		Total	
2004	Albirex Niigata Singapore	S.League	12	1	-		-		12	1
Total			12	1	-		-		12	1
Japan			League		Emperor's Cup		J.League Cup		Total	
2005	Avispa Fukuoka	J2 League	14	0	0	0	-		14	0
2006	Avispa Fukuoka	J1 League	6	0	2	0	4	0	12	0
2007	Avispa Fukuoka	J2 League	42	0	2	0	-		44	0
2008	Avispa Fukuoka	J2 League	40	0	0	0	-		40	0
2009	Avispa Fukuoka	J2 League	45	0	1	0	-		46	0
2010	Avispa Fukuoka	J2 League	31	1	3	0	-		34	1
2011	Avispa Fukuoka	J1 League	31	0	2	0	2	0	35	0
Total			209	1	10	0	6	0	225	1
2012	Tochigi SC	J2 League	19	0	1	0	-		20	0
2013	Tochigi SC	J2 League	31	0	1	0	-		32	0
2014	Tochigi SC	J2 League	34	0	1	0	-		35	0
2015	Tochigi SC	J2 League	19	0	1	0	-		20	0
2016	Tochigi SC	J3 League	27	1	-		-		27	1
Total			130	1	4	0	-		134	1
2017	Kataller Toyama	J3 League	31	0	2	0	-		33	0
Total			31	0	2	0	-		33	0
Career total			390	4	20	1	6	0	416	5
