= 2003 Sanfrecce Hiroshima season =

Sanfrecce Hiroshima
2003 season
- Manager: Takeshi Ono
- Stadium: Hiroshima Big Arch
- J. League 2: 2nd
- Emperor's Cup: 4th Round
- Top goalscorer: Robson (14)
Home colours	Away colours

2003 Sanfrecce Hiroshima season

== Competitions ==
Competitions	Position
J. League 2	2nd / 12 clubs
Emperor's Cup	4th Round

== Domestic results ==
=== J. League 2 ===
Match	Date	Venue	Opponents	Score
1	2003.3.15	Hiroshima Big Arch	Kawasaki Frontale	2-2
2	2003.3.23	Tosu Stadium	Sagan Tosu	4-3
3	2003.3.29	Hiroshima Stadium	Montedio Yamagata	2-1
4	2003.4.5	Hiratsuka Athletics Stadium	Shonan Bellmare	1-0
5	2003.4.9	Hiroshima Stadium	Mito HollyHock	3-0
6	2003.4.12	Niigata City Athletic Stadium	Albirex Niigata	2-1
7	2003.4.19	Hiroshima Big Arch	Yokohama F.C.	6-1
8	2003.4.26	Sapporo Dome	Consadole Sapporo	2-0
9	2003.4.29	Hiroshima Stadium	Ventforet Kofu	1-0
10	2003.5.5	Hakata no mori stadium	Avispa Fukuoka	2-0
11	2003.5.10	Hiroshima Stadium	Omiya Ardija	2-1
12	2003.5.14	Todoroki Athletics Stadium	Kawasaki Frontale	0-1
13	2003.5.17	Hiroshima Big Arch	Sagan Tosu	2-1
14	2003.5.24	Yamagata Park Stadium	Montedio Yamagata	0-0
15	2003.5.31	Hiroshima Big Arch	Shonan Bellmare	0-0
16	2003.6.7	Hiroshima Stadium	Avispa Fukuoka	3-1
17	2003.6.14	Ōmiya Park Soccer Stadium	Omiya Ardija	1-1
18	2003.6.18	Hiroshima Stadium	Consadole Sapporo	1-1
19	2003.6.21	Mitsuzawa Stadium	Yokohama F.C.	1-0
20	2003.6.28	Hiroshima Big Arch	Albirex Niigata	0-0
21	2003.7.2	Kasamatsu Stadium	Mito HollyHock	1-0
22	2003.7.5	Kose Sports Stadium	Ventforet Kofu	0-1
23	2003.7.19	Hiroshima Stadium	Omiya Ardija	1-2
24	2003.7.26	Tosu Stadium	Sagan Tosu	2-2
25	2003.7.30	Hiroshima Stadium	Kawasaki Frontale	1-1
26	2003.8.2	Hiratsuka Athletics Stadium	Shonan Bellmare	0-1
27	2003.8.10	Hakata no mori stadium	Avispa Fukuoka	1-3
28	2003.8.16	Hiroshima Stadium	Yokohama F.C.	3-0
29	2003.8.23	Niigata Stadium	Albirex Niigata	1-3
30	2003.8.30	Hiroshima Big Arch	Mito HollyHock	1-1
31	2003.9.3	Sapporo Atsubetsu Park Stadium	Consadole Sapporo	2-1
32	2003.9.6	Hiroshima Big Arch	Ventforet Kofu	2-0
33	2003.9.13	Hiroshima Stadium	Montedio Yamagata	1-0
34	2003.9.20	Yumenoshima Stadium	Yokohama F.C.	2-0
35	2003.9.23	Hiroshima Big Arch	Albirex Niigata	1-0
36	2003.9.27	Ōmiya Park Soccer Stadium	Omiya Ardija	2-0
37	2003.10.4	Hiroshima Big Arch	Consadole Sapporo	1-0
38	2003.10.11	Kose Sports Stadium	Ventforet Kofu	0-0
39	2003.10.18	Hiroshima Big Arch	Avispa Fukuoka	0-2
40	2003.10.25	Kasamatsu Stadium	Mito HollyHock	0-0
41	2003.11.1	Hiroshima Stadium	Shonan Bellmare	3-0
42	2003.11.8	Yamagata Park Stadium	Montedio Yamagata	2-1
43	2003.11.15	Hiroshima Big Arch	Sagan Tosu	2-1
44	2003.11.23	Todoroki Athletics Stadium	Kawasaki Frontale	1-2

=== Emperor's Cup ===
Match	Date	Venue	Opponents	Score
1st Round	2003..	[[]]	[[]]	-
2nd Round	2003..	[[]]	[[]]	-
3rd Round	2003..	[[]]	[[]]	-
4th Round	2003..	[[]]	[[]]	-

== Player statistics ==
No.	Pos.	Player	D.o.B. (Age)	Height / Weight	J. League 2		Emperor's Cup		Total	
No.	Pos.	Player	D.o.B. (Age)	Height / Weight	Apps	Goals	Apps	Goals	Apps	Goals
1	GK	Takashi Shimoda	November 28, 1975 (aged 27)	cm / kg	43	0				
2	DF	Ricardo	February 23, 1977 (aged 26)	cm / kg	43	2				
3	DF	Kentaro Sawada	May 15, 1970 (aged 32)	cm / kg	2	0				
4	MF	Hiroyoshi Kuwabara	October 2, 1971 (aged 31)	cm / kg	16	0				
5	DF	Yūichi Komano	July 25, 1981 (aged 21)	cm / kg	23	0				
6	MF	César Sampaio	March 31, 1968 (aged 34)	cm / kg	41	5				
7	MF	Kōji Morisaki	May 9, 1981 (aged 21)	cm / kg	37	10				
8	MF	Kazuyuki Morisaki	May 9, 1981 (aged 21)	cm / kg	41	1				
9	FW	Yutaka Takahashi	September 29, 1980 (aged 22)	cm / kg	21	8				
10	FW	Tomislav Erceg	October 22, 1971 (aged 31)	cm / kg	5	2				
10	FW	David Robson	November 29, 1970 (aged 32)	cm / kg	32	14				
11	FW	Hiroto Mogi	March 2, 1984 (aged 19)	cm / kg	23	5				
13	FW	Koji Matsuura	May 5, 1980 (aged 22)	cm / kg	3	1				
14	MF	Kyohei Yamagata	September 7, 1981 (aged 21)	cm / kg	4	0				
15	MF	Yuki Matsushita	December 7, 1981 (aged 21)	cm / kg	13	0				
16	FW	Naoya Umeda	April 27, 1978 (aged 24)	cm / kg	15	1				
17	MF	Kota Hattori	November 22, 1977 (aged 25)	cm / kg	44	1				
18	DF	Kosuke Yatsuda	March 17, 1982 (aged 20)	cm / kg	24	0				
19	DF	Kenichi Uemura	April 22, 1974 (aged 28)	cm / kg	38	0				
20	FW	Susumu Oki	February 23, 1976 (aged 27)	cm / kg	36	8				
21	GK	Takuto Hayashi	August 9, 1982 (aged 20)	cm / kg	1	0				
22	DF	Jungo Kono	July 9, 1982 (aged 20)	cm / kg	0	0				
23	MF	Ri Han-Jae	June 27, 1982 (aged 20)	cm / kg	22	1				
24	DF	Hiroyuki Nishijima	April 7, 1982 (aged 20)	cm / kg	0	0				
25	MF	Takeshi Suda	April 14, 1983 (aged 19)	cm / kg	0	0				
26	MF	Kazumasa Takagi	December 17, 1984 (aged 18)	cm / kg	11	0				
27	FW	Genki Nakayama	September 15, 1981 (aged 21)	cm / kg	17	2				
28	MF	Sotaro Sada	March 18, 1984 (aged 18)	cm / kg	0	0				
29	MF	Hideki Nishimura	April 15, 1983 (aged 19)	cm / kg	4	0				
30	DF	Yuki Okubo	April 17, 1984 (aged 18)	cm / kg	0	0				
31	GK	Masaharu Kawahara	May 30, 1984 (aged 18)	cm / kg	0	0				
32	FW	Toshiya Tanaka	November 12, 1984 (aged 18)	cm / kg	0	0				
33	GK	Yushi Ozaki	March 24, 1969 (aged 33)	cm / kg	0	0				
34	FW	Tatsuro Kimura	June 24, 1984 (aged 18)	cm / kg	0	0				
35	MF	Yojiro Takahagi	August 2, 1986 (aged 16)	cm / kg	4	0				
36	FW	Yasuo Manaka	January 31, 1971 (aged 32)	cm / kg	14	2				
37	DF	Yusuke Igawa	October 30, 1982 (aged 20)	cm / kg	15	1				

== Other pages ==
- (in Japanese) J. League official site
