= Shogo Kobara =

Japanese footballer

Shogo Kobara 小原 章吾
Personal information
- Full name: Shogo Kobara
- Date of birth: November 2, 1982 (age 44)
- Place of birth: Yokohama, Kanagawa, Japan
- Height: 1.82 m (5 ft 11 1/2 in)
- Position: Defender

Youth career
- 1998: Yokohama Flügels
- 1999–2000: Yokohama F. Marinos

Senior career*
Years	Team	Apps	(Gls)
2001–2003	Yokohama F. Marinos	11	(0)
2004	Vegalta Sendai	26	(0)
2005–2009	Montedio Yamagata	145	(11)
2010	Ehime FC	26	(2)
2011–2012	Avispa Fukuoka	43	(1)
2013	Ehime FC	20	(0)
Total		271	(14)
Medal record
Yokohama F. Marinos
Winner	J1 League	2003
Runner-up	J1 League	2002
Winner	J.League Cup	2001
- * Club domestic league appearances and goals

Shogo Kobara (小原 章吾, Kobara Shogo; born November 2, 1982) is a former Japanese football player.

== Playing career ==
Kobara was born in Yokohama on November 2, 1982. He joined the J1 League club Yokohama F. Marinos youth team in 2001. Although he played several matches as center back during the first season, he did not play much in the club that had Japan national team players Naoki Matsuda, Yasuhiro Hato, and Yuji Nakazawa. In 2004, he moved to the J2 League club Vegalta Sendai and played often. In 2005, he moved to the J2 club Montedio Yamagata. He became a regular player and played often as center back with Leonardo Henriques da Silva. However his opportunity to play decreased, as opposed to newcomer Hidenori Ishii, starting in 2008. Although the club was promoted to J1 in 2009, he did not become a regular player. In 2010, he moved to the J2 club Ehime FC and played as a regular player. In 2011, he moved to the J1 club Avispa Fukuoka. Although he played often, the club was relegated to J2 in 2012. In 2013, he moved to the J2 club Ehime FC again. He retired at the end of the 2013 season.

== Career statistics ==
Appearances and goals by club, season and competition
Club	Season	League			Emperor's Cup		J.League Cup		Total	
Club	Season	Division	Apps	Goals	Apps	Goals	Apps	Goals	Apps	Goals
Yokohama F. Marinos	2001	J1 League	5	0	0	0	2	0	7	0
Yokohama F. Marinos	2002	J1 League	5	0	0	0	5	0	10	0
Yokohama F. Marinos	2003	J1 League	1	0	0	0	1	0	2	0
Vegalta Sendai	2004	J2 League	26	0	2	0	—		28	0
Montedio Yamagata	2005	J2 League	35	1	0	0	—		35	1
Montedio Yamagata	2006	J2 League	43	4	2	0	—		45	4
Montedio Yamagata	2007	J2 League	35	2	1	0	—		36	2
Montedio Yamagata	2008	J2 League	18	2	0	0	—		18	2
Montedio Yamagata	2009	J1 League	14	2	2	0	3	0	19	2
Ehime FC	2010	J2 League	26	2	1	0	—		27	2
Avispa Fukuoka	2011	J1 League	20	0	1	0	1	0	22	0
Avispa Fukuoka	2012	J2 League	23	1	0	0	—		23	1
Ehime FC	2013	J2 League	20	0	1	0	—		21	0
Career total			271	14	10	0	12	0	293	14
