= 2002 Sanfrecce Hiroshima season =

Sanfrecce Hiroshima
2002 season
- Manager: Gadzhi Gadzhiyev; Takahiro Kimura; Takeshi Ono
- Stadium: Hiroshima Big Arch
- J. League 1: 15th
- Emperor's Cup: Semifinals
- J. League Cup: GL-D 4th
- Top goalscorer: Tatsuhiko Kubo (7)
Home colours	Away colours

2002 Sanfrecce Hiroshima season

== Competitions ==
Competitions	Position
J. League 1	15th / 16 clubs
Emperor's Cup	Semifinals
J. League Cup	GL-D 4th / 4 clubs

== Domestic results ==
=== J. League 1 ===
==== First stage ====
Pos	Team	Pld	W	OTW	D	L	GF	GA	GD	Pts
12	Tokyo Verdy 1969	15	2	3	1	9	15	24	−9	13
13	Vissel Kobe	15	3	1	1	10	12	22	−10	12
14	Kashiwa Reysol	15	3	1	0	11	20	31	−11	11
15	Sanfrecce Hiroshima	15	3	0	1	11	14	26	−12	10
16	Consadole Sapporo	15	2	0	0	13	15	35	−20	6

Source: J.League Data Site

Match	Date	Venue	Opponents	Score
1-1	2002.3.3	Hiroshima Big Arch	Consadole Sapporo	5-1
1-2	2002.3.9	Hitachi Kashiwa Soccer Stadium	Kashiwa Reysol	1-2
1-3	2002.3.16	Hiroshima Big Arch	Kyoto Purple Sanga	2-1
1-4	2002.3.31	Hiroshima Big Arch	Kashima Antlers	0-1
1-5	2002.4.7	Urawa Komaba Stadium	Urawa Red Diamonds	1-4
1-6	2002.4.13	Hiroshima Big Arch	Yokohama F. Marinos	0-2
1-7	2002.4.21	Hiroshima Big Arch	Shimizu S-Pulse	0-0 a.e.t.
1-8	2002.7.14	Tokyo Stadium	F.C. Tokyo	0-4
1-9	2002.7.20	Ichihara Seaside Stadium	JEF United Ichihara	1-0
1-10	2002.7.24	Hiroshima Stadium	Gamba Osaka	1-2
1-11	2002.7.27	Hiroshima Big Arch	Nagoya Grampus Eight	0-1
1-12	2002.8.3	Sendai Stadium	Vegalta Sendai	2-4
1-13	2002.8.7	Hiroshima Big Arch	Júbilo Iwata	0-1 a.e.t. (sudden death)
1-14	2002.8.10	Tokyo Stadium	Tokyo Verdy 1969	0-1 a.e.t. (sudden death)
1-15	2002.8.17	Kobe Universiade Memorial Stadium	Vissel Kobe	1-2

==== Second stage ====
Pos	Team	Pld	W	OTW	D	L	GF	GA	GD	Pts
12	Shimizu S-Pulse (Note: Cup-Winner 2001 Emperor's Cup)	15	5	1	0	9	16	24	−8	17
13	Nagoya Grampus Eight	15	5	0	1	9	21	23	−2	16
14	Sanfrecce Hiroshima	15	4	1	2	8	18	21	−3	16
15	Vegalta Sendai (Note: Promoted from 2001 J.League Division 2)	15	3	1	1	10	17	30	−13	12
16	Consadole Sapporo	15	2	1	1	11	15	29	−14	9

Source: J.League Data Site
Notes:

Match	Date	Venue	Opponents	Score
2-1	2002.8.31	Hiroshima Big Arch	Urawa Red Diamonds	1-2 a.e.t. (sudden death)
2-2	2002.9.7	International Stadium Yokohama	Yokohama F. Marinos	2-1
2-3	2002.9.14	Hiroshima Big Arch	F.C. Tokyo	2-1 a.e.t. (sudden death)
2-4	2002.9.18	Osaka Expo '70 Stadium	Gamba Osaka	0-1
2-5	2002.9.22	Hiroshima Stadium	JEF United Ichihara	1-0
2-6	2002.9.29	Kagoshima Kamoike Stadium	Kyoto Purple Sanga	0-2
2-7	2002.10.5	Hiroshima Stadium	Vegalta Sendai	1-2 a.e.t. (sudden death)
2-8	2002.10.13	Mizuho Athletic Stadium	Nagoya Grampus Eight	1-3
2-9	2002.10.19	Hiroshima Big Arch	Tokyo Verdy 1969	0-0 a.e.t.
2-10	2002.10.23	Yamaha Stadium	Júbilo Iwata	0-1
2-11	2002.10.26	Nihondaira Sports Stadium	Shimizu S-Pulse	1-2 a.e.t. (sudden death)
2-12	2002.11.9	Hiroshima Big Arch	Vissel Kobe	1-1 a.e.t.
2-13	2002.11.16	Kashima Soccer Stadium	Kashima Antlers	2-0
2-14	2002.11.23	Hiroshima Big Arch	Kashiwa Reysol	2-0
2-15	2002.11.30	Sapporo Dome	Consadole Sapporo	4-5 a.e.t. (sudden death)

==== Overall table ====
Pos	Team	Pld	W	OTW	D	L	GF	GA	GD	Pts	Qualification or relegation
12	Kashiwa Reysol	30	9	1	3	17	38	48	−10	32	
13	Vegalta Sendai (Note: Promoted from 2001 J.League Division 2)	30	9	2	1	18	40	57	−17	32	
14	Vissel Kobe	30	8	2	3	17	33	44	−11	31	
15	Sanfrecce Hiroshima	30	7	1	3	19	32	47	−15	26	Relegated to the 2003 J.League Division 2
16	Consadole Sapporo	30	4	1	1	24	30	64	−34	15	Relegated to the 2003 J.League Division 2

=== Emperor's Cup ===
15 December 2002 Third Round	Sanfrecce Hiroshima	2–0	Albirex Niigata	Hiroshima
	Takahashi 57'; Yamagata 81'	Report		Stadium: Hiroshima Big Arch; Attendance: 3,468

22 December 2002 Fourth Round	Sanfrecce Hiroshima	2–1	Yokohama F. Marinos	Hiroshima
	Ka. Morisaki 29'; Oki 41'	Report	Shimizu 20'	Stadium: Hiroshima Big Arch; Attendance: 5,122

25 December 2002 Quarterfinals	Shimizu S-Pulse	1–3	Sanfrecce Hiroshima	Shimizu-ku
	Baron 17'	Report	Kubo 31' (pen.), 62'; Ka. Morisaki 84'	Stadium: Nihondaira Sports Stadium; Attendance: 6,835

29 December 2002 Semifinals	Kyoto Purple Sanga	2–1	Sanfrecce Hiroshima	Kyoto
	Matsui 13', 21'	Report	Kō. Morisaki 72'	Stadium: Nishikyogoku Athletic Stadium; Attendance: 8,909

=== J. League Cup ===
Pos	Team	Pld	W	D	L	GF	GA	GD	Pts	Qualification
1	Urawa Red Diamonds	6	4	1	1	12	10	+2	13	Quarterfinals
2	Kashima Antlers	6	3	0	3	9	10	−1	9	Quarterfinals
3	Nagoya Grampus Eight	6	2	1	3	11	9	+2	7	
4	Sanfrecce Hiroshima	6	1	2	3	4	7	−3	5	

Source: rsssf.com

27 April 2002 Matchday 1	Kashima Antlers	1–0	Sanfrecce Hiroshima	Hitachinaka
15:00	Nozawa 42'	Report		Stadium: Hitachinaka City Stadium; Attendance: 4,565; Referee: Masayoshi Okada

30 April 2002 Matchday 2	Sanfrecce Hiroshima	1–1	Nagoya Grampus Eight	Hiroshima
19:00	Fujimoto 69'	Report	Katagiri 89'	Stadium: West Hiroshima Stadium; Attendance: 2,940; Referee: Yasuhiro Hemmi

3 May 2002 Matchday 3	Sanfrecce Hiroshima	0–0	Urawa Red Diamonds	Hiroshima
15:00		Report		Stadium: Hiroshima Big Arch; Attendance: 8,014; Referee: Keiichi Sunakawa

6 May 2002 Matchday 4	Urawa Red Diamonds	3–1	Sanfrecce Hiroshima	Saitama
15:04	Emerson 75'; Tuto 78', 84'	Report	Takahashi 49'	Stadium: Urawa Komaba Stadium; Attendance: 17,361; Referee: Toshimitsu Yoshida

9 May 2002 Matchday 5	Nagoya Grampus Eight	1–2	Sanfrecce Hiroshima	Nagoya
19:00	Kaimoto 6'	Report	Fujimoto 40'; Takahashi 56'	Stadium: Mizuho Athletic Stadium; Attendance: 4,278; Referee: Yasuhiro Matsuzaki

12 May 2002 Matchday 6	Sanfrecce Hiroshima	0–1	Kashima Antlers	Hiroshima
14:00		Report	Augusto 87'	Stadium: Hiroshima Big Arch; Attendance: 6,215; Referee: Kazuhisa Osada

== International results ==
25 May 2002 International friendly	Republic of Ireland	2–1	Sanfrecce Hiroshima	Izumo
	Rob. Keane 42', 78'	Report	Kubo 38'	Stadium: Hamayama Park

== Player statistics ==
No.	Pos.	Player	D.o.B. (Age)	Height / Weight	J. League 1		Emperor's Cup		J. League Cup		Total	
No.	Pos.	Player	D.o.B. (Age)	Height / Weight	Apps	Goals	Apps	Goals	Apps	Goals	Apps	Goals
1	GK	Takashi Shimoda	November 28, 1975 (aged 26)	cm / kg	29	0						
2	DF	Shinya Kawashima	July 20, 1978 (aged 23)	cm / kg	8	0						
3	DF	Kentaro Sawada	May 15, 1970 (aged 31)	cm / kg	26	2						
4	MF	Hiroyoshi Kuwabara	October 2, 1971 (aged 30)	cm / kg	14	0						
5	DF	Yūichi Komano	July 25, 1981 (aged 20)	cm / kg	27	1						
6	DF	Marcus Tulio Tanaka	April 24, 1981 (aged 20)	cm / kg	22	1						
7	MF											
8	MF	Kazuyuki Morisaki	May 9, 1981 (aged 20)	cm / kg	25	1						
9	FW	Yutaka Takahashi	September 29, 1980 (aged 21)	cm / kg	15	1						
10	FW	Tatsuhiko Kubo	June 18, 1976 (aged 25)	cm / kg	28	7						
11	MF	Chikara Fujimoto	October 31, 1977 (aged 24)	cm / kg	29	4						
13	GK	Ryuji Kato	December 24, 1969 (aged 32)	cm / kg	0	0						
13	FW	Naoki Naruo	October 5, 1974 (aged 27)	cm / kg	3	0						
14	MF	Kyohei Yamagata	September 7, 1981 (aged 20)	cm / kg	1	0						
15	MF	Yuki Matsushita	December 7, 1981 (aged 20)	cm / kg	13	0						
16	FW	Naoya Umeda	April 27, 1978 (aged 23)	cm / kg	14	1						
17	MF	Kota Hattori	November 22, 1977 (aged 24)	cm / kg	21	0						
18	DF	Kosuke Yatsuda	March 17, 1982 (aged 19)	cm / kg	7	0						
19	DF	Kenichi Uemura	April 22, 1974 (aged 27)	cm / kg	10	1						
20	FW	Susumu Oki	February 23, 1976 (aged 26)	cm / kg	18	4						
21	GK	Takuto Hayashi	August 9, 1982 (aged 19)	cm / kg	1	0						
22	DF	Jungo Kono	July 9, 1982 (aged 19)	cm / kg	0	0						
23	MF	Ri Han-Jae	June 27, 1982 (aged 19)	cm / kg	1	0						
24	DF	Hiroyuki Nishijima	April 7, 1982 (aged 19)	cm / kg	0	0						
25	MF	Takeshi Suda	April 14, 1983 (aged 18)	cm / kg	0	0						
26	FW	Hiroto Mogi	March 2, 1984 (aged 18)	cm / kg	15	2						
27	FW	Genki Nakayama	September 15, 1981 (aged 20)	cm / kg	6	0						
28	MF	Sotaro Sada	March 18, 1984 (aged 17)	cm / kg	0	0						
29	MF	Hideki Nishimura	April 15, 1983 (aged 18)	cm / kg	0	0						
30	DF	Yoshiro Nakamura	October 17, 1979 (aged 22)	cm / kg	4	0						
31	DF	Billong	June 16, 1973 (aged 28)	cm / kg	25	0						
32	MF	Milo	December 4, 1974 (aged 27)	cm / kg	8	0						
33	GK	Yushi Ozaki	March 24, 1969 (aged 32)	cm / kg	2	0						
34	DF	Jun Ideguchi	May 14, 1979 (aged 22)	cm / kg	7	0						
35	FW	Tomislav Erceg	October 22, 1971 (aged 30)	cm / kg	10	1						

== Other pages ==
- (in Japanese) J. League official site
