= Sotaro Sada =

Japanese footballer

Sotaro Sada 佐田 聡太郎
Personal information
- Full name: Sotaro Sada
- Date of birth: March 18, 1984 (age 42)
- Place of birth: Maebashi, Gunma, Japan
- Height: 1.75 m (5 ft 9 in)
- Position: Defender

Youth career
- 1999–2001: Maebashi Ikuei High School

Senior career*
Years	Team	Apps	(Gls)
2002–2003	Sanfrecce Hiroshima	0	(0)
2004–2011	Thespa Kusatsu	221	(8)
2012	AC Nagano Parceiro	13	(1)
Total		234	(9)
- * Club domestic league appearances and goals

Sotaro Sada (佐田 聡太郎, Sada Sōtarō; born March 18, 1984) is a former Japanese football player.

== Playing career ==
Sada was born in Maebashi on March 18, 1984. After graduating from high school, Sada joined J1 League club Sanfrecce Hiroshima in 2002. Sanfrecce was relegated to J2 League from 2003 season. In 2004, he moved to Japan Football League (JFL) club Thespa Kusatsu, where he played as a defensive right back. Thespa was promoted to J2 from 2005. Shortly afterwards, Sada became a more frequent player. His opportunity to play decreased from summer 2010. In 2012, Sada moved to JFL club AC Nagano Parceiro. He retired at the end of the 2012 season.

== Club statistics ==
Club performance			League		Cup		League Cup		Total	
Season	Club	League	Apps	Goals	Apps	Goals	Apps	Goals	Apps	Goals
Japan			League		Emperor's Cup		J.League Cup		Total	
2002	Sanfrecce Hiroshima	J1 League	0	0	0	0	0	0	0	0
2003	Sanfrecce Hiroshima	J2 League	0	0	0	0	-		0	0
2004	Thespa Kusatsu	Football League	19	0	0	0	-		19	0
2005	Thespa Kusatsu	J2 League	26	2	2	0	-		28	2
2006	Thespa Kusatsu	J2 League	45	4	2	0	-		47	4
2007	Thespa Kusatsu	J2 League	39	0	1	0	-		40	0
2008	Thespa Kusatsu	J2 League	10	0	1	0	-		11	0
2009	Thespa Kusatsu	J2 League	44	1	1	0	-		45	1
2010	Thespa Kusatsu	J2 League	25	1	1	0	-		26	1
2011	Thespa Kusatsu	J2 League	13	1	1	0	-		14	1
2012	AC Nagano Parceiro	Football League	13	1	1	0	-		14	1
Career total			234	9	10	0	0	0	253	9
