= Jun Suzuki =

Jun Suzuki may refer to:

- Jun Suzuki (footballer, born 1961) (鈴木 淳), Japanese football manager and former midfielder
- Jun Suzuki (footballer, born 1989) (鈴木 惇), Japanese football midfielder
- Jun Suzuki (footballer, born 1993) (鈴木 潤), Japanese football defender
- Jun Suzuki (bassist), Japanese musician, currently plays bass as a support member to The Pillows

== Fictional characters ==
- Jun Suzuki (K-On!) (鈴木 純), a character in the manga series K-On!
