= Yuki Matsushita (footballer) =

Japanese footballer

Yuki Matsushita 松下 裕樹
Personal information
- Full name: Yuki Matsushita
- Date of birth: December 7, 1981 (age 44)
- Place of birth: Takasaki, Gunma, Japan
- Height: 1.74 m (5 ft 8 1/2 in)
- Position: Midfielder

Youth career
- 1997–1999: Maebashi Ikuei High School

Senior career*
Years	Team	Apps	(Gls)
2000–2003	Sanfrecce Hiroshima	29	(0)
2004–2006	Avispa Fukuoka	39	(3)
2006	Kawasaki Frontale	4	(0)
2007–2012	Thespa Kusatsu	225	(15)
2013–2014	Yokohama FC	57	(3)
2015–2018	Thespakusatsu Gunma	127	(6)
2019	Tochigi City FC	14	(0)
Total		495	(27)
Medal record
Kawasaki Frontale
Runner-up	J1 League	2006
- * Club domestic league appearances and goals

Yuki Matsushita (松下 裕樹, Matsushita Yūki; born December 7, 1981) is a former Japanese football player. He last played for Tochigi City FC.

== Playing career ==
Matsushita was born in Takasaki on December 7, 1981. After graduating from high school, he joined J1 League club Sanfrecce Hiroshima in 2000. Although he could hardly play in the match until 2001, he played many matches as defensive midfielder in 2002. However Sanfrecce finished at the 15th place in 2002 season and was relegated to J2 League. In 2003, Sanfrecce won the 2nd place and was returned to J1 in a year.

In 2004, Matsushita moved to J2 club Avispa Fukuoka. Although he could not play many matches in 2004, he played many matches and Avispa won the 2nd place in 2005. However he could hardly play in the match in J1 in 2006. In June 2006, he moved to Kawasaki Frontale.

In 2007, Matsushita moved to J2 club Thespa Kusatsu (later Thespakusatsu Gunma) based in his local Gunma Prefecture. He became a regular player as defensive midfielder soon and played many matches in 6 seasons. In 2013, he moved to J2 club Yokohama FC and played many matches in 2 seasons. In 2015, he re-joined Thespakusatsu Gunma for the first time in 2 years. Although he played as regular player, the club results was sluggish and was relegated to J3 League end of 2017 season. His opportunity to play also decreased in 2018.

On 22 December 2018, Tochigi City FC announced the signing of Matsushita from Thespakusatsu Gunma.

== Club statistics ==
As of end of 2018 season

Club performance			League		Cup		League Cup		Total	
Season	Club	League	Apps	Goals	Apps	Goals	Apps	Goals	Apps	Goals
Japan			League		Emperor's Cup		J.League Cup		Total	
2000	Sanfrecce Hiroshima	J1 League	2	0	1	0	0	0	3	0
2001	Sanfrecce Hiroshima	J1 League	1	0	1	0	2	0	4	0
2002	Sanfrecce Hiroshima	J1 League	13	0	0	0	2	0	15	0
2003	Sanfrecce Hiroshima	J2 League	13	0	2	0	-		15	0
Total			29	0	4	0	4	0	37	0
2004	Avispa Fukuoka	J2 League	11	0	1	1	-		12	1
2005	Avispa Fukuoka	J2 League	25	3	2	1	-		27	4
2006	Avispa Fukuoka	J1 League	3	0	0	0	2	0	5	0
Total			39	3	3	2	2	0	44	5
2006	Kawasaki Frontale	J1 League	4	0	0	0	0	0	4	0
Total			4	0	0	0	0	0	4	0
2007	Thespa Kusatsu	J2 League	37	3	2	0	-		39	3
2008	Thespa Kusatsu	J2 League	36	2	2	0	-		38	2
2009	Thespa Kusatsu	J2 League	45	3	1	0	-		46	3
2010	Thespa Kusatsu	J2 League	33	3	1	0	-		34	3
2011	Thespa Kusatsu	J2 League	37	1	0	0	-		37	1
2012	Thespa Kusatsu	J2 League	37	3	0	0	-		37	3
Total			225	15	6	0	-		231	15
2013	Yokohama FC	J2 League	30	0	1	0	-		31	0
2014	Yokohama FC	J2 League	27	3	1	0	-		28	3
Total			57	3	2	0	-		59	3
2015	Thespakusatsu Gunma	J2 League	37	2	0	0	-		37	2
2016	Thespakusatsu Gunma	J2 League	41	3	1	0	-		42	3
2017	Thespakusatsu Gunma	J2 League	32	0	0	0	-		32	0
2018	Thespakusatsu Gunma	J3 League	17	1	2	0	-		19	1
Total			127	6	3	0	-		130	6
2019	Tochigi City FC	JRL (Kanto, Div. 1)	14	0	1	0	-		15	0
Total			14	0	1	0	-		15	0
Career total			495	27	19	2	6	0	520	29
