= Yutaka Takahashi =

Japanese footballer

Yutaka Takahashi 高橋 泰
Personal information
- Full name: Yutaka Takahashi
- Date of birth: September 29, 1980 (age 46)
- Place of birth: Machida, Tokyo, Japan
- Height: 1.73 m (5 ft 8 in)
- Position: Forward

Youth career
- 1996–1998: Teikyo High School

Senior career*
Years	Team	Apps	(Gls)
1999–2003	Sanfrecce Hiroshima	96	(20)
2004	Omiya Ardija	20	(2)
2005	JEF United Chiba	1	(0)
2006–2008	Roasso Kumamoto	110	(63)
2009–2012	Avispa Fukuoka	118	(17)
2013	Ehime FC	9	(0)
2013–2015	Kamatamare Sanuki	49	(12)
Total		403	(114)
Medal record
Sanfrecce Hiroshima
Runner-up	Emperor's Cup	1999
JEF United Chiba
Winner	J.League Cup	2005
- * Club domestic league appearances and goals

Yutaka Takahashi (高橋 泰, Takahashi Yutaka; born September 29, 1980) is a former Japanese football player.

== Playing career ==
Takahashi was born in Machida on September 29, 1980. After graduating from high school, he joined J1 League club Sanfrecce Hiroshima in 1999. He played many matches as forward from first season. However his opportunity to play decreased from 2002. In 2004, he moved to J2 League club Omiya Ardija. Although he played as substitute, he could not play many matches. In 2005, he moved to JEF United Chiba. However he could hardly play in the match. In 2006, he moved to Japan Football League (JFL) club Rosso Kumamoto (later Roasso Kumamoto). He played as regular player and scored many goals. The club was also promoted to J2 from 2008. In 2009, he moved to J2 club Avispa Fukuoka. He played many matches in 4 seasons. In 2013, he moved to J2 club Ehime FC. However he could not play many matches. In July 2013, he moved to JFL club Kamatamare Sanuki. He played many matches and the club was promoted to J2 from 2014. However his opportunity to play decreased from 2015 and he retired end of 2015 season.

== Club statistics ==
Season	Club	Division	League		Emperor's Cup		J.League Cup		Other^{1}		Total	
Season	Club	Division	Apps	Goals	Apps	Goals	Apps	Goals	Apps	Goals	Apps	Goals
1999	Sanfrecce Hiroshima	J1 League	24	6	5	3	3	1	-		32	10
2000	Sanfrecce Hiroshima	J1 League	12	0	2	1	2	0	-		16	1
2001	Sanfrecce Hiroshima	J1 League	24	5	1	0	6	2	-		31	7
2002	Sanfrecce Hiroshima	J1 League	15	1	4	1	5	2	-		24	4
2003	Sanfrecce Hiroshima	J2 League	21	8	1	0	-		-		22	8
Total			96	20	13	5	16	5	-		125	30
2004	Omiya Ardija	J2 League	20	2	1	2	-		-		21	4
Total			20	2	1	2	-		-		21	4
2005	JEF United Chiba	J1 League	1	0	0	0	3	0	-		4	0
Total			1	0	0	0	3	0	-		4	0
2006	Rosso Kumamoto	Football League	34	15	3	1	-		-		37	16
2007	Rosso Kumamoto	Football League	34	29	1	1	-		-		35	30
2008	Roasso Kumamoto	J2 League	42	19	1	0	-		-		43	19
Total			110	63	5	2	-		-		115	65
2009	Avispa Fukuoka	J2 League	44	8	2	0	-		-		46	8
2010	Avispa Fukuoka	J2 League	22	4	3	2	-		-		25	6
2011	Avispa Fukuoka	J1 League	21	2	2	1	1	0	-		24	3
2012	Avispa Fukuoka	J2 League	31	3	2	0	-		-		33	3
Total			118	17	9	3	1	0	-		128	20
2013	Ehime FC	J2 League	9	0	0	0	-		-		9	0
Total			9	0	0	0	-		-		9	0
2013	Kamatamare Sanuki	Football League	10	7	0	0	-		2	2	12	9
2014	Kamatamare Sanuki	J2 League	29	4	1	0	-		2	0	32	4
2015	Kamatamare Sanuki	J2 League	10	1	1	0	-		-		11	1
Total			49	12	2	0	-		4	2	55	14
Career total			403	114	30	12	20	5	4	2	457	133

^{1}Includes 2013 J2/J3 playoff and 2014 J2/J3 playoff.
