= Naoya Umeda =

Japanese footballer

Naoya Umeda 梅田 直哉
Personal information
- Full name: Naoya Umeda
- Date of birth: April 27, 1978 (age 48)
- Place of birth: Fuchu, Hiroshima, Japan
- Height: 1.85 m (6 ft 1 in)
- Position: Forward

Youth career
- 1994–1996: Hiroshima Minami High School
- 1997–2000: Meiji University

Senior career*
Years	Team	Apps	(Gls)
2001–2003	Sanfrecce Hiroshima	39	(2)
2004–2005	Urawa Reds	0	(0)
2004	→ Montedio Yamagata (loan)	12	(2)
2005–2008	Shonan Bellmare	43	(5)
2009–2011	Gainare Tottori	41	(7)
2012	FC Gifu	10	(0)
Total		145	(16)
Medal record
Urawa Reds
Runner-up	J1 League	2004
Runner-up	J1 League	2005
Runner-up	J.League Cup	2004
Winner	Emperor's Cup	2005
- * Club domestic league appearances and goals

Naoya Umeda (梅田 直哉, Umeda Naoya; born April 27, 1978) is a former Japanese football player.

== Playing career ==
Umeda was born in Fuchu, Hiroshima on April 27, 1978. After graduating from Meiji University, he joined J1 League club Sanfrecce Hiroshima based in his local in 2001. He played many matches from first season. However Sanfrecce was relegated to J2 League end of 2002 season. In 2004, he moved to J1 club Urawa Reds. However he could hardly play in the match. In September 2004, he moved to J2 club Montedio Yamagata on loan. He played all 12 matches until end of the season. In 2005, he returned to Urawa Reds. However he could not play at all in the match. In June 2005, he moved to J2 club Shonan Bellmare. Although he played many matches in 2005 season, he could not play many matches for injury from 2006. In 2009, he moved to Japan Football League club Gainare Tottori. Although he could not play many matches for injury until summer 2010, he became a regular player in summer 2010. Gainare also won the champions in 2010 season and was promoted to J2. In 2012, he moved to FC Gifu. He retired end of 2012 season.

== Club statistics ==
Club performance			League		Cup		League Cup		Total	
Season	Club	League	Apps	Goals	Apps	Goals	Apps	Goals	Apps	Goals
Japan			League		Emperor's Cup		J.League Cup		Total	
2001	Sanfrecce Hiroshima	J1 League	10	0	2	0	4	0	16	0
2002	Sanfrecce Hiroshima	J1 League	14	1	0	0	1	0	15	1
2003	Sanfrecce Hiroshima	J2 League	15	1	0	0	-		15	1
Total			39	2	2	0	5	0	46	2
2004	Urawa Reds	J1 League	0	0	0	0	4	0	4	0
Total			0	0	0	0	4	0	4	0
2004	Montedio Yamagata	J2 League	12	2	2	1	-		14	3
Total			12	2	2	1	-		14	3
2005	Urawa Reds	J1 League	0	0	0	0	0	0	0	0
Total			0	0	0	0	0	0	0	0
2005	Shonan Bellmare	J2 League	17	4	1	0	-		18	4
2006	Shonan Bellmare	J2 League	7	1	0	0	-		7	1
2007	Shonan Bellmare	J2 League	15	0	1	0	-		16	0
2008	Shonan Bellmare	J2 League	4	0	0	0	-		4	0
Total			43	5	2	0	-		45	5
2009	Gainare Tottori	Football League	4	0	1	0	-		5	0
2010	Gainare Tottori	Football League	16	7	1	0	-		17	7
2011	Gainare Tottori	J2 League	21	0	0	0	-		21	0
Total			41	7	2	0	-		43	7
2012	FC Gifu	J2 League	10	0	0	0	-		10	0
Total			10	0	0	0	-		10	0
Career total			145	16	8	1	9	0	162	17
