= 2001 Sanfrecce Hiroshima season =

Sanfrecce Hiroshima
2001 season
- Manager: Valery Nepomnyashchy
- Stadium: Hiroshima Big Arch
- J.League 1: 9th
- Emperor's Cup: 4th Round
- J.League Cup: Quarterfinals
- Top goalscorer: Tatsuhiko Kubo (15)
Home colours	Away colours

2001 Sanfrecce Hiroshima season

== Competitions ==
Competitions	Position
J.League 1	9th / 16 clubs
Emperor's Cup	4th round
J.League Cup	Quarterfinals

== Domestic results ==
=== J.League 1 ===
11 March 2001 1-1	Kashima Antlers	2-1	Sanfrecce Hiroshima	Tokyo National Stadium
JST (UTC+09)

17 March 2001 1-2	Sanfrecce Hiroshima	1-4	Júbilo Iwata	Hiroshima Big Arch
JST (UTC+09)

31 March 2001 1-3	Sanfrecce Hiroshima	1-0	Consadole Sapporo	Hiroshima Big Arch
JST (UTC+09)

7 April 2001 1-4	Kashiwa Reysol	2-1 (GG) (a.e.t.)	Sanfrecce Hiroshima	Hitachi Kashiwa Soccer Stadium
JST (UTC+09)

14 April 2001 1-5	Sanfrecce Hiroshima	2-3	Avispa Fukuoka	Hiroshima Stadium
JST (UTC+09)

29 April 2001 1-6	Yokohama F. Marinos	2-1	Sanfrecce Hiroshima	International Stadium Yokohama
JST (UTC+09)

3 May 2001 1-7	Sanfrecce Hiroshima	3-0	FC Tokyo	Hiroshima Big Arch
JST (UTC+09)

6 May 2001 1-8	JEF United Ichihara	1-3	Sanfrecce Hiroshima	Ichihara Seaside Stadium
JST (UTC+09)

12 May 2001 1-9	Sanfrecce Hiroshima	3-2 (GG) (a.e.t.)	Cerezo Osaka	Hiroshima Stadium
JST (UTC+09)

19 May 2001 1-10	Sanfrecce Hiroshima	3-2 (GG) (a.e.t.)	Tokyo Verdy 1969	Hiroshima Stadium
JST (UTC+09)

16 June 2001 1-11	Vissel Kobe	1-0	Sanfrecce Hiroshima	Kobe Universiade Memorial Stadium
JST (UTC+09)

23 June 2001 1-12	Sanfrecce Hiroshima	2-3	Gamba Osaka	Hiroshima Big Arch
JST (UTC+09)

7 July 2001 1-13	Shimizu S-Pulse	5-1	Sanfrecce Hiroshima	Nihondaira Sports Stadium
JST (UTC+09)

14 July 2001 1-14	Nagoya Grampus Eight	3-2 (GG) (a.e.t.)	Sanfrecce Hiroshima	Mizuho Athletic Stadium
JST (UTC+09)

21 July 2001 1-15	Sanfrecce Hiroshima	1-3	Urawa Red Diamonds	Hiroshima Big Arch
JST (UTC+09)

11 August 2001 2-1	Cerezo Osaka	2-6	Sanfrecce Hiroshima	Osaka Nagai Stadium
JST (UTC+09)

18 August 2001 2-2	Sanfrecce Hiroshima	2-0	JEF United Ichihara	Hiroshima Stadium
JST (UTC+09)

25 August 2001 2-3	Urawa Red Diamonds	2-1	Sanfrecce Hiroshima	Urawa Komaba Stadium
JST (UTC+09)

8 September 2001 2-4	Sanfrecce Hiroshima	2-4	Nagoya Grampus Eight	Hiroshima Big Arch
JST (UTC+09)

15 September 2001 2-5	FC Tokyo	3-2	Sanfrecce Hiroshima	Tokyo Stadium
JST (UTC+09)

22 September 2001 2-6	Sanfrecce Hiroshima	3-1	Yokohama F. Marinos	Hiroshima Big Arch
JST (UTC+09)

29 September 2001 2-7	Avispa Fukuoka	0-4	Sanfrecce Hiroshima	Hakatanomori Football Stadium
JST (UTC+09)

13 October 2001 2-8	Sanfrecce Hiroshima	2-4	Kashiwa Reysol	Hiroshima Stadium
JST (UTC+09)

17 October 2001 2-9	Consadole Sapporo	4-2	Sanfrecce Hiroshima	Sapporo Atsubetsu Park Stadium
JST (UTC+09)

20 October 2001 2-10	Tokyo Verdy 1969	2-0	Sanfrecce Hiroshima	Tokyo Stadium
JST (UTC+09)

31 October 2001 2-11	Sanfrecce Hiroshima	3-2	Vissel Kobe	Hiroshima Stadium
JST (UTC+09)

3 November 2001 2-12	Gamba Osaka	1-2	Sanfrecce Hiroshima	Ishikawa Kanazawa Stadium
JST (UTC+09)

10 November 2001 2-13	Sanfrecce Hiroshima	3-0	Shimizu S-Pulse	Hiroshima Stadium
JST (UTC+09)

17 November 2001 2-14	Júbilo Iwata	1-0	Sanfrecce Hiroshima	Júbilo Iwata Stadium
JST (UTC+09)

24 November 2001 2-15	Sanfrecce Hiroshima	4-1	Kashima Antlers	Hiroshima Big Arch
JST (UTC+09)

=== Emperor's Cup ===
1st Round	bye

2nd Round	bye

9 December 2001 3rd Round	Sanfrecce Hiroshima	1-0	Vegalta Sendai	Hiroshima Stadium
JST (UTC+09)

16 December 2001 4th Round	Sanfrecce Hiroshima	0-4	Shimizu S-Pulse	Nihondaira Sports Stadium
JST (UTC+09)

=== J.League Cup ===
4 April 2001 1st Round-1	Albirex Niigata	0-2	Sanfrecce Hiroshima	Niigata City Athletic Stadium
JST (UTC+09)

18 April 2001 1st Round-2	Sanfrecce Hiroshima	2-0 (4-0 agg.)	Albirex Niigata	Hiroshima Stadium
JST (UTC+09)

13 June 2001 2nd Round-1	Sanfrecce Hiroshima	3-3	FC Tokyo	Hiroshima Stadium
JST (UTC+09)

20 June 2001 2nd Round-2	FC Tokyo	1-2 (GG) (a.e.t.) (4-5 agg.)	Sanfrecce Hiroshima	Tokyo Stadium
JST (UTC+09)

8 August 2001 Quarterfinals-1	Sanfrecce Hiroshima	2-3	Nagoya Grampus Eight	Hiroshima Stadium
JST (UTC+09)

22 August 2001 Quarterfinals-2	Nagoya Grampus Eight	1-0 (4-2 agg.)	Sanfrecce Hiroshima	Mizuho Athletic Stadium
JST (UTC+09)

== Player statistics ==
No.	Pos.	Nat.	Player	D.o.B. (Age)	Height / Weight	J.League 1		Emperor's Cup		J.League Cup		Total	
No.	Pos.	Nat.	Player	D.o.B. (Age)	Height / Weight	Apps	Goals	Apps	Goals	Apps	Goals	Apps	Goals
1	GK	(Japan)	Takashi Shimoda	November 28, 1975 (aged 25)	cm / kg	29	0						
2	DF	(Japan)	Shinya Kawashima	July 20, 1978 (aged 22)	cm / kg	4	0						
2	DF	(Uzbekistan)	Oleg Pashinin	September 12, 1974 (aged 26)	cm / kg	12	2						
3	DF	(Japan)	Kentaro Sawada	May 15, 1970 (aged 30)	cm / kg	24	0						
4	MF	(Japan)	Hiroyoshi Kuwabara	October 2, 1971 (aged 29)	cm / kg	28	0						
5	DF	(Japan)	Yūichi Komano	July 25, 1981 (aged 19)	cm / kg	24	1						
6	DF	(Japan)	Ryosuke Okuno	November 13, 1968 (aged 32)	cm / kg	21	1						
7	MF	(Japan)	Hajime Moriyasu	August 23, 1968 (aged 32)	cm / kg	16	0						
8	MF	(Japan)	Kazuyuki Morisaki	May 9, 1981 (aged 19)	cm / kg	26	1						
9	MF	(Australia)	Steve Corica	March 24, 1973 (aged 27)	cm / kg	22	11						
10	FW	(Japan)	Tatsuhiko Kubo	June 18, 1976 (aged 24)	cm / kg	30	15						
11	MF	(Japan)	Chikara Fujimoto	October 31, 1977 (aged 23)	cm / kg	28	9						
13	GK	(Japan)	Ryuji Kato	December 24, 1969 (aged 31)	cm / kg	2	0						
14	FW	(Japan)	Yutaka Takahashi	September 29, 1980 (aged 20)	cm / kg	24	5						
15	MF	(Japan)	Kōji Morisaki	May 9, 1981 (aged 19)	cm / kg	2	2						
16	FW	(Japan)	Naoya Umeda	April 27, 1978 (aged 22)	cm / kg	10	0						
17	MF	(Japan)	Kota Hattori	November 22, 1977 (aged 23)	cm / kg	28	0						
18	DF	(Australia)	Tony Popovic	July 4, 1973 (aged 27)	cm / kg	7	0						
18	FW	(Ukraine)	Serhiy Skachenko	November 18, 1972 (aged 28)	cm / kg	11	2						
19	DF	(Japan)	Kenichi Uemura	April 22, 1974 (aged 26)	cm / kg	25	2						
20	FW	(Japan)	Susumu Oki	February 23, 1976 (aged 25)	cm / kg	20	8						
21	GK	(Japan)	Takuto Hayashi	August 9, 1982 (aged 18)	cm / kg	0	0						
22	DF	(Japan)	Jungo Kono	July 9, 1982 (aged 18)	cm / kg	0	0						
23	DF	(Brazil)	Marcus Tulio Tanaka	April 24, 1981 (aged 19)	cm / kg	17	1						
24	DF	(Japan)	Hiroyuki Nishijima	April 7, 1982 (aged 18)	cm / kg	0	0						
25	MF	(Japan)	Kyohei Yamagata	September 7, 1981 (aged 19)	cm / kg	2	0						
26	MF	(Japan)	Yuki Matsushita	December 7, 1981 (aged 19)	cm / kg	1	0						
27	FW	(Japan)	Genki Nakayama	September 15, 1981 (aged 19)	cm / kg	0	0						
28	DF	(Japan)	Kosuke Yatsuda	March 17, 1982 (aged 18)	cm / kg	3	0						
29	FW	(Japan)	Sachio Yoshida	April 6, 1980 (aged 20)	cm / kg	1	0						
30	MF	(Japan)	Kohei Miyazaki	February 6, 1981 (aged 20)	cm / kg	3	0						
31	FW	(Japan)	Ryota Terauchi	April 26, 1982 (aged 18)	cm / kg	0	0						
32	MF	(North Korea)	Ri Han-Jae	June 27, 1982 (aged 18)	cm / kg	0	0						
