= Kyohei Yamagata =

Japanese footballer

Kyohei Yamagata 山形 恭平
Personal information
- Full name: Kyohei Yamagata
- Date of birth: September 7, 1981 (age 45)
- Place of birth: Kitakyushu, Fukuoka, Japan
- Height: 1.68 m (5 ft 6 in)
- Position: Midfielder

Youth career
- 1997–1999: Higashi Fukuoka High School

Senior career*
Years	Team	Apps	(Gls)
2000–2003	Sanfrecce Hiroshima	7	(0)
2004–2007	Avispa Fukuoka	113	(15)
2008	V-Varen Nagasaki	14	(5)
Total		134	(20)
- * Club domestic league appearances and goals

Kyohei Yamagata (山形 恭平, Yamagata Kyohei; born September 7, 1981) is a former Japanese football player. His younger brother Tatsunori Yamagata is also footballer.

== Playing career ==
Yamagata was born in Kitakyushu on September 7, 1981. After graduating from high school, he joined J1 League club Sanfrecce Hiroshima in 2000. However he could hardly play in the match and the club was relegated to J2 League from 2003. In 2004, he moved to J2 club Avispa Fukuoka based in his local. He became a regular player and the club was promoted to J1 from 2006. His younger brother Tatsunori Yamagata also joined the club from 2005 and played together. However he could hardly play in the match in 2006 and the club was relegated to J2 in a year. In 2007, he became a regular player again. In 2008, he moved to Regional Leagues club V-Varen Nagasaki. He played many matches and retired end of 2008 season.

== Club statistics ==
Club performance			League		Cup		League Cup		Total	
Season	Club	League	Apps	Goals	Apps	Goals	Apps	Goals	Apps	Goals
Japan			League		Emperor's Cup		J.League Cup		Total	
2000	Sanfrecce Hiroshima	J1 League	0	0	0	0	0	0	0	0
2001	Sanfrecce Hiroshima	J1 League	2	0	0	0	3	0	5	0
2002	Sanfrecce Hiroshima	J1 League	1	0	1	1	1	0	3	1
2003	Sanfrecce Hiroshima	J2 League	4	0	1	0	-		5	0
2004	Avispa Fukuoka	J2 League	38	8	1	0	-		29	8
2005	Avispa Fukuoka	J2 League	34	4	0	0	-		34	4
2006	Avispa Fukuoka	J1 League	4	0	0	0	2	0	6	0
2007	Avispa Fukuoka	J2 League	37	3	0	0	-		37	3
2008	V-Varen Nagasaki	Regional Leagues	14	5	-		-		14	5
Career total			134	20	3	1	6	0	143	21
