= Kosuke Yatsuda =

Japanese footballer

Kosuke Yatsuda 八田 康介
Personal information
- Full name: Kosuke Yatsuda
- Date of birth: March 17, 1982 (age 44)
- Place of birth: Okawa, Fukuoka, Japan
- Height: 1.84 m (6 ft 1/2 in)
- Position: Defender

Youth career
- 1997–1999: Yanagawa High School

Senior career*
| Years | Team | Apps | (Gls) |
| 2000–2006 | Sanfrecce Hiroshima | 41 | (0) |
| 2005 | →Sagan Tosu (loan) | 29 | (2) |
| 2007 | FC Tokyo | 1 | (0) |
| 2008–2009 | Yokohama FC | 56 | (3) |
| 2010 | Tokushima Vortis | 0 | (0) |
| 2011 | SC Sagamihara | 12 | (0) |
| 2012 | Avispa Fukuoka | 0 | (0) |
| Total | | 139 | (5) |
- * Club domestic league appearances and goals

Kosuke Yatsuda (八田 康介, Yatsuda Kōsuke; born March 17, 1982) is a former Japanese football player.

== Playing career ==
Yatsuda was born in Okawa on March 17, 1982. After graduating from high school, he joined J1 League club Sanfrecce Hiroshima in 2000. However he could not play many matches until 2002 and the club was relegated to J2 League from 2003. In 2003, he played many matches as center back and the club was promoted to J1 from 2004. However he could hardly play in the match in 2004. In 2005, he moved to J2 club Sagan Tosu on loan. He played as regular center back until summer. However he could hardly play in the match from summer. In 2006, he returned to Sanfrecce Hiroshima. However he could hardly play in the match. In 2007, he moved to J1 club FC Tokyo. However he could hardly play in the match. In 2008, he moved to J2 club Yokohama FC. He played many matches as one of a regular player in 2 seasons. In 2010, he moved to J2 club Tokushima Vortis. However he could not play at all in the match. In 2011, he moved to Regional Leagues club SC Sagamihara and played many matches. In 2012, he moved to J2 club Avispa Fukuoka based in his local. However he could not play at all in the match and retired end of 2012 season.

== Career statistics ==
Appearances and goals by club, season and competition
| Club | Season | League | | | Emperor's Cup | | J.League Cup | | Total | |
| Club | Season | Division | Apps | Goals | Apps | Goals | Apps | Goals | Apps | Goals |
|---|---|---|---|---|---|---|---|---|---|---|
| Sanfrecce Hiroshima | 2000 | J1 League | 0 | 0 | 0 | 0 | 0 | 0 | 0 | 0 |
| Sanfrecce Hiroshima | 2001 | J1 League | 3 | 0 | 0 | 0 | 2 | 0 | 5 | 0 |
| Sanfrecce Hiroshima | 2002 | J1 League | 7 | 0 | 2 | 0 | 4 | 0 | 13 | 0 |
| Sanfrecce Hiroshima | 2003 | J2 League | 24 | 0 | 1 | 0 | - | | 25 | 0 |
| Sanfrecce Hiroshima | 2004 | J1 League | 3 | 0 | 0 | 0 | 0 | 0 | 3 | 0 |
| Sagan Tosu | 2005 | J2 League | 29 | 2 | 2 | 0 | - | | 31 | 2 |
| Sanfrecce Hiroshima | 2006 | J1 League | 4 | 0 | 0 | 0 | 4 | 0 | 8 | 0 |
| FC Tokyo | 2007 | J1 League | 1 | 0 | 0 | 0 | 0 | 0 | 1 | 0 |
| Yokohama FC | 2008 | J2 League | 30 | 1 | 0 | 0 | - | | 30 | 1 |
| Yokohama FC | 2009 | J2 League | 26 | 2 | 1 | 0 | - | | 27 | 2 |
| Tokushima Vortis | 2010 | J2 League | 0 | 0 | 0 | 0 | - | | 0 | 0 |
| SC Sagamihara | 2011 | Regional Leagues | 12 | 0 | 0 | 0 | - | | 12 | 0 |
| Avispa Fukuoka | 2012 | J2 League | 0 | 0 | 0 | 0 | - | | 0 | 0 |
| Career total | | | 139 | 5 | 6 | 0 | 10 | 0 | 155 | 5 |
