= Hideki Nishimura =

Japanese footballer

Hideki Nishimura 西村 英樹
Personal information
- Full name: Hideki Nishimura
- Date of birth: April 15, 1983 (age 43)
- Place of birth: Takatsuki, Osaka, Japan
- Height: 1.70 m (5 ft 7 in)
- Position: Midfielder

Youth career
- 1999–2001: Gamba Osaka

Senior career*
Years	Team	Apps	(Gls)
2002–2004	Sanfrecce Hiroshima	4	(0)
2002	→SC Tottori (loan)	6	(2)
2005–2007	Gainare Tottori	89	(7)
2008	Banditonce Kakogawa	13	(1)
2009	Volador Matsue		
Total		112	(10)
- * Club domestic league appearances and goals

Hideki Nishimura (西村 英樹, Nishimura Hideki; born April 15, 1983) is a former Japanese football player.

== Playing career ==
Nishimura was born in Takatsuki on April 15, 1983. He joined J1 League club Sanfrecce Hiroshima from Gamba Osaka youth team in 2002. On May 6, he debuted as substitute midfielder against Urawa Reds in J.League Cup. In September, he was loaned to Japan Football League (JFL) club SC Tottori (later Gainare Tottori) and played many matches. In 2003, he returned to Sanfrecce. However he could hardly play in the match. In 2005, he moved to Gainare for the first time in 2 years. He played as regular player in 3 seasons. In 2008, he moved to Regional Leagues club Banditonce Kakogawa. In 2009, he moved to Prefectural Leagues club Volador Matsue. He retired end of 2009 season.

== Career statistics ==
Appearances and goals by club, season and competition
Club	Season	League			Emperor's Cup		J.League Cup		Total	
Club	Season	Division	Apps	Goals	Apps	Goals	Apps	Goals	Apps	Goals
Sanfrecce Hiroshima	2002	J1 League	0	0	0	0	1	0	1	0
SC Tottori	2002	Football League	6	2	0	0	—		6	2
Sanfrecce Hiroshima	2003	J2 League	4	0	0	0	—		4	0
Sanfrecce Hiroshima	2004	J1 League	0	0	0	0	0	0	0	0
SC Tottori	2005	Football League	29	2	2	0	—		31	2
SC Tottori	2006	Football League	29	3	2	1	—		31	4
Gainare Tottori	2007	Football League	31	2	2	1	—		33	3
Banditonce Kakogawa	2008	Regional Leagues	13	1	1	0	—		14	1
Career total			112	10	7	2	1	0	120	12
