= Samir (footballer, born 1981) =

Brazilian footballer

Personal information
- Full name: Samir Lima de Araújo
- Date of birth: October 25, 1981 (age 45)
- Place of birth: Tuiuti, Brazil
- Height: 1.80 m (5 ft 11 in)
- Position: Striker

Senior career*
Years	Team	Apps	(Gls)
2000–2001	Bragantino		
2001–2003	Vitória		
2004	Corinthians		
2004	Guangzhou Rizhiquan	16	(3)
2005	Jiangsu Sainty	20	(4)
2006–2007	Figueirense		
2007	Beijing Hongdeng	13	(1)
2008	Guarani		
2009	Rio Preto		
2010	Remo	4	(0)
2011	Campinense	5	(0)
2012	Sampaio Corrêa	2	(0)
2012	Avispa Fukuoka	11	(0)
- * Club domestic league appearances and goals as of 28 November 2012

Samir Lima de Araújo (born October 25, 1981), known as just Samir, is a Brazilian football player who last played for Avispa Fukuoka.

== Career ==
Born in Tuiuti. Samir began his playing career with Bragantino. He joined Vitória in 2001, and made his Campeonato Brasileiro Série A debut for the club in 2002, scoring 2 goals in 12 matches.

In September 2004, Samir signed a contract with China League One side Guangzhou Rizhiquan from Corinthians, replacing Gary Glasgow who injured in the 2006 FIFA World Cup qualification. He made his League One debut on 6 September in a 2 - 1 home win against Zhejiang Greentown. Samir scored in his fourth match for Guangzhou which broke brance of the match in a 1 - 1 draw with Qingdao Hailifeng on 22 September. He scored 3 goals in 16 appearances in the 2004 league season and moved to another League One club Jiangsu Sainty in 2005. He scored only 2 goals in the 2005 league season and was released by the club.

On 18 March 2007, Samir transferred to China League One club Beijing Hongdeng. He played as attacking midfielder in the club and scored his first and only goal of the season on 11 August, in a 3 - 1 home victory against Harbin Yiteng.

Samir moved to Japan and signed a contract with J2 League side Avispa Fukuoka in March 2012 but was released after just one season having made only 9 league appearances.
