= Hiroyuki Omata =

Japanese footballer (born 1983)

Hiroyuki Omata 尾亦 弘友希
Personal information
- Full name: Hiroyuki Omata
- Date of birth: September 1, 1983 (age 43)
- Place of birth: Suginami, Tokyo, Japan
- Height: 1.80 m (5 ft 11 in)
- Position: Defender

Youth career
- 1999–2001: FC Tokyo

Senior career*
Years	Team	Apps	(Gls)
2002–2005	FC Tokyo	1	(0)
2004	→Omiya Ardija (loan)	0	(0)
2006–2007	Shonan Bellmare	78	(0)
2008–2011	Cerezo Osaka	34	(0)
2012–2013	Avispa Fukuoka	38	(0)
Total		151	(0)
Medal record
Representing Japan
AFC U-19 Championship
Silver medal – second place	2002 Qatar
- * Club domestic league appearances and goals

Hiroyuki Omata (尾亦 弘友希, Omata Hiroyuki; born September 1, 1983) is a former Japanese footballer.

== Playing career ==
Omata was born in Suginami, Tokyo on September 1, 1983. He joined J1 League club FC Tokyo from youth team in 2002. On April 6, he debuted as substitute defender from extra time against JEF United Ichihara. However he could not play at all in the match after the debut. Although he was loaned to J2 League club Omiya Ardija in 2004, he could not play at all in the match. In 2005, he returned to Tokyo. However he could not play at all in the match. In 2006, he moved to J2 club Shonan Bellmare. He became a regular player as left side back soon and played all 47 matches except 1 match for suspension in 2006. He played as regular player in 2007 too. In 2008, he moved to Cerezo Osaka. However he could not play many matches for repeated injuries. In 2012, he moved to Avispa Fukuoka. He played many matches in 2 seasons. He retired end of 2013 season.

== Club statistics ==
Club performance			League		Cup		League Cup		Total	
Season	Club	League	Apps	Goals	Apps	Goals	Apps	Goals	Apps	Goals
Japan			League		Emperor's Cup		J.League Cup		Total	
2002	FC Tokyo	J1 League	1	0	0	0	0	0	1	0
2003	FC Tokyo	J1 League	0	0	0	0	0	0	0	0
Total			1	0	0	0	0	0	1	0
2004	Omiya Ardija	J2 League	0	0	0	0	-		0	0
Total			0	0	0	0	-		0	0
2005	FC Tokyo	J1 League	0	0	0	0	0	0	0	0
Total			0	0	0	0	0	0	0	0
2006	Shonan Bellmare	J2 League	47	0	2	0	-		49	0
2007	Shonan Bellmare	J2 League	31	0	2	0	-		33	0
Total			78	0	4	0	-		82	0
2008	Cerezo Osaka	J2 League	17	0	0	0	-		17	0
2009	Cerezo Osaka	J2 League	2	0	1	0	-		3	0
2010	Cerezo Osaka	J1 League	11	0	0	0	2	0	13	0
2011	Cerezo Osaka	J1 League	4	0	0	0	0	0	4	0
Total			34	0	1	0	2	0	37	0
2012	Avispa Fukuoka	J2 League	19	0	1	0	-		20	0
2013	Avispa Fukuoka	J2 League	19	0	0	0	-		19	0
Total			38	0	1	0	-		39	0
Career total			151	0	6	0	2	0	159	0
