= Shunsuke Tsutsumi =

Japanese footballer

Shunsuke Tsutsumi 堤俊輔
Personal information
- Full name: Shunsuke Tsutsumi
- Date of birth: 8 June 1987 (age 39)
- Place of birth: Niiza, Saitama, Japan
- Height: 1.78 m (5 ft 10 in)
- Positions: Right back; center back

Youth career
- 2000–2005: Urawa Red Diamonds

Senior career*
Years	Team	Apps	(Gls)
2006–2011	Urawa Red Diamonds	19	(0)
2010	→ Roasso Kumamoto (loan)	18	(0)
2011	Tochigi SC	5	(0)
2012–2018	Avispa Fukuoka	188	(5)
2019	Kagoshima United FC	33	(0)

International career^{‡}
2005–2006	Japan U-20	7	(0)
Medal record
Urawa Reds
Winner	AFC Champions League	2007
Winner	J1 League	2006
Runner-up	J1 League	2007
Runner-up	J.League Cup	2011
Winner	Emperor's Cup	2006
Representing Japan
AFC U-19 Championship
Silver medal – second place	2006 India
- * Club domestic league appearances and goals as of 7 January 2020 ‡ National team caps and goals as of 25 July 2010

Shunsuke Tsutsumi (堤 俊輔, Tsutsumi Shunsuke; born 8 June 1987) is a former Japanese football (soccer) player. He was a defender.

== Career ==
After many seasons with Avispa Fukuoka and just one year with Kagoshima United FC, Tsutsumi opted to retire in January 2020.

== Career statistics ==
=== Club ===
Updated to 23 February 2020.

Appearances and goals by club, season and competition
Club	Season	League		Emperor's Cup		J. League Cup		AFC		Other^{*}		Total	
Club	Season	Apps	Goals	Apps	Goals	Apps	Goals	Apps	Goals	Apps	Goals	Apps	Goals
Urawa Red Diamonds	2006	0	0	0	0	0	0	—		—		0	0
Urawa Red Diamonds	2007	0	0	0	0	2	0	0	0	1	0	3	0
Urawa Red Diamonds	2008	18	0	1	0	5	0	1	0	—		26	0
Urawa Red Diamonds	2009	0	0	0	0	0	0	—		—		0	0
Urawa Red Diamonds	2010	1	0	—		1	0	—		—		2	0
Roasso Kumamoto	2010	18	0	2	0	—		—		—		20	0
Urawa Red Diamonds	2011	0	0	—		0	0	—		—		0	0
Tochigi SC	2011	5	0	1	0	—		—		—		6	0
Avispa Fukuoka	2012	23	0	1	0	—		—		—		24	0
Avispa Fukuoka	2013	40	1	0	0	—		—		—		40	1
Avispa Fukuoka	2014	42	4	0	0	—		—		—		42	4
Avispa Fukuoka	2015	40	0	2	0	—		—		—		42	0
Avispa Fukuoka	2016	15	0	2	0	3	0	—		—		20	0
Avispa Fukuoka	2017	17	0	2	0	—		—		—		19	0
Avispa Fukuoka	2018	11	0	2	0	—		—		—		13	0
Kagoshima United FC	2019	33	0	1	0	—		—		—		34	0
Career total		263	5	14	0	11	0	1	0	1	0	290	5

^{*}Includes other competitive competitions, including the A3 Champions Cup.

=== International ===
National team	Year	Apps	Goals
Japan U-20
Japan U-20	2005	2	0
Japan U-20	2006	5	0
Japan U-20	Total	7	0

=== Appearances in major competitions ===
Team	Competition	Category	Appearances		Goals	Team record
Team	Competition	Category	Start	Sub	Goals	Team record
Japan	AFC Youth Championship 2006 Qualification	U-18	2	0	0	Qualified
Japan	AFC Youth Championship 2006	U-19	5	0	0	2nd place

== Awards and honours ==
=== Club ===
Urawa Red Diamonds

- J. League Division 1: 1

2006

- Emperor's Cup: 2

2005, 2006

- AFC Champions League: 1

2007

- Japanese Super Cup: 1

2006
