= 2014 Tochigi SC season =

Tochigi SC
2014 season
- Manager: Yuji Sakakura
- Stadium: Tochigi Green Stadium
- J2 League: 12th
Home colours	Away colours

2014 Tochigi SC season..

== League table ==
Pos	Team	Pld	W	D	L	GF	GA	GD	Pts
10	Consadole Sapporo	42	15	14	13	48	44	+4	59
11	Yokohama FC	42	14	13	15	49	47	+2	55
12	Tochigi SC	42	15	10	17	52	58	−6	55
13	Roasso Kumamoto	42	13	15	14	45	53	−8	54
14	V-Varen Nagasaki	42	12	16	14	45	42	+3	52

Updated to match(es) played on 23 November 2014. Source: J.League data
Rules for classification: 1) points; 2) goal difference; 3) number of goals scored.

== J2 League ==
Match	Date	Team	Score	Team	Venue	Attendance
1	2014.03.02	JEF United Chiba	0-2	Tochigi SC	Fukuda Denshi Arena	8,395
2	2014.03.09	Tochigi SC	1-1	Yokohama FC	Tochigi Green Stadium	6,907
3	2014.03.16	Kyoto Sanga FC	0-0	Tochigi SC	Kyoto Nishikyogoku Athletic Stadium	8,290
4	2014.03.22	Tochigi SC	3-0	Thespakusatsu Gunma	Tochigi Green Stadium	4,174
5	2014.03.30	Tochigi SC	0-2	Júbilo Iwata	Tochigi Green Stadium	6,194
6	2014.04.05	Kamatamare Sanuki	0-1	Tochigi SC	Kagawa Marugame Stadium	1,450
7	2014.04.13	Tochigi SC	1-2	Matsumoto Yamaga FC	Tochigi Green Stadium	6,887
8	2014.04.20	FC Gifu	1-3	Tochigi SC	Gifu Nagaragawa Stadium	5,460
9	2014.04.26	Tochigi SC	0-1	Mito HollyHock	Tochigi Green Stadium	4,069
10	2014.04.29	Ehime FC	0-1	Tochigi SC	Ningineer Stadium	2,935
11	2014.05.03	Tochigi SC	2-1	Consadole Sapporo	Tochigi Green Stadium	5,775
12	2014.05.06	Shonan Bellmare	2-1	Tochigi SC	Shonan BMW Stadium Hiratsuka	9,185
13	2014.05.11	Tochigi SC	0-1	Fagiano Okayama	Tochigi Green Stadium	4,200
14	2014.05.18	V-Varen Nagasaki	1-1	Tochigi SC	Nagasaki Stadium	4,016
15	2014.05.24	Tochigi SC	1-1	Roasso Kumamoto	Tochigi Green Stadium	3,536
16	2014.05.31	Giravanz Kitakyushu	0-1	Tochigi SC	Honjo Stadium	3,112
17	2014.06.07	Montedio Yamagata	6-1	Tochigi SC	ND Soft Stadium Yamagata	4,295
18	2014.06.14	Tochigi SC	4-0	Oita Trinita	Tochigi Green Stadium	4,319
19	2014.06.21	Tokyo Verdy	1-1	Tochigi SC	Ajinomoto Stadium	3,629
20	2014.06.28	Avispa Fukuoka	2-0	Tochigi SC	Level5 Stadium	4,211
21	2014.07.05	Tochigi SC	2-1	Kataller Toyama	Tochigi Green Stadium	4,227
22	2014.07.20	Tochigi SC	0-2	JEF United Chiba	Tochigi Green Stadium	6,325
23	2014.07.26	Fagiano Okayama	3-1	Tochigi SC	Kanko Stadium	7,528
24	2014.07.30	Oita Trinita	2-1	Tochigi SC	Oita Bank Dome	5,028
25	2014.08.03	Tochigi SC	1-2	Kamatamare Sanuki	Tochigi Green Stadium	9,131
26	2014.08.10	Matsumoto Yamaga FC	2-1	Tochigi SC	Matsumotodaira Park Stadium	8,608
27	2014.08.17	Tochigi SC	0-3	Shonan Bellmare	Tochigi Green Stadium	6,084
28	2014.08.25	Consadole Sapporo	1-1	Tochigi SC	Sapporo Dome	8,797
29	2014.08.31	Júbilo Iwata	2-3	Tochigi SC	Yamaha Stadium	6,292
30	2014.09.06	Tochigi SC	3-3	Ehime FC	Tochigi Green Stadium	4,319
31	2014.09.14	Tochigi SC	3-2	Tokyo Verdy	Tochigi Green Stadium	5,801
32	2014.09.20	Roasso Kumamoto	2-1	Tochigi SC	Umakana-Yokana Stadium	5,218
33	2014.09.23	Tochigi SC	1-1	Montedio Yamagata	Tochigi Green Stadium	4,428
34	2014.09.28	Thespakusatsu Gunma	2-0	Tochigi SC	Shoda Shoyu Stadium Gunma	3,608
35	2014.10.04	Tochigi SC	2-1	Kyoto Sanga FC	Tochigi Green Stadium	3,155
36	2014.10.11	Tochigi SC	1-1	Giravanz Kitakyushu	Tochigi Green Stadium	8,017
37	2014.10.19	Yokohama FC	3-0	Tochigi SC	NHK Spring Mitsuzawa Football Stadium	4,198
38	2014.10.26	Tochigi SC	1-1	Avispa Fukuoka	Tochigi Green Stadium	3,602
39	2014.11.01	Kataller Toyama	1-0	Tochigi SC	Toyama Stadium	2,837
40	2014.11.09	Tochigi SC	3-0	FC Gifu	Tochigi Green Stadium	4,085
41	2014.11.15	Mito HollyHock	1-2	Tochigi SC	K's denki Stadium Mito	7,020
42	2014.11.23	Tochigi SC	1-0	V-Varen Nagasaki	Tochigi Green Stadium	5,943
