= Kim Min-je =

South Korean footballer

Personal information
- Date of birth: 12 September 1989 (age 37)
- Place of birth: Busan, South Korea
- Height: 1.69 m (5 ft 7 in)
- Position: Fullback

Youth career
- Bukyung High School
- Chung Ang University

Senior career*
Years	Team	Apps	(Gls)
2011–2013	Avispa Fukuoka	52	(0)
2014	Ehime FC	22	(0)
2015–2016	Seoul E-Land	31	(1)
2016–2018	Suwon FC	18	(1)
- * Club domestic league appearances and goals as of 1 January 2019

- Kim Min-je
- Hangul: 김민제
- Hanja: 金旼弟
- RR: Gim Minje
- MR: Kim Minje

Kim Min-je (born 12 September 1989) is a South Korean retired association footballer who played as a mobile defender, and could be utilized at fullback, or on the wings.

== Career ==
Kim made his debut for the Avispa side on the opening day of the 2011 J. League Division 1 season, in a 3–0 loss to Albirex Niigata.

== Club statistics ==
Club performance			League		Cup		League Cup		Total	
Season	Club	League	Apps	Goals	Apps	Goals	Apps	Goals	Apps	Goals
Japan			League		Emperor's Cup		League Cup		Total	
2011	Avispa Fukuoka	J1 League	18	0	2	0	2	0	22	0
2012	Avispa Fukuoka	J2 League	27	0	1	0	—		28	0
2013	Avispa Fukuoka	J2 League	7	0	0	0	—		7	0
Career total			52	0	3	0	2	0	57	0
