= 2016 Tochigi SC season =

Tochigi SC
2016 season
- Manager: Yuji Yokoyama
- Stadium: Tochigi Green Stadium
- J3 League: 2nd
Home colours	Away colours

2016 Tochigi SC season.

== League table ==
Pos	Team	Pld	W	D	L	GF	GA	GD	Pts	Qualification or relegation
1	Oita Trinita (C, P)	30	19	4	7	50	24	+26	61	Promotion to 2017 J2 League
2	Tochigi SC	30	17	8	5	38	20	+18	59	Qualification to J2 promotion playoffs (Note: Only teams that hold a J2 license are eligible for promotion.)
3	Nagano Parceiro	30	15	7	8	33	22	+11	52	
4	Blaublitz Akita	30	14	8	8	37	26	+11	50	
5	Kagoshima United	30	15	5	10	39	29	+10	50	

Updated to match(es) played on 20 November 2016. Source: 2016 MEIJI YASUDA J3 LEAGUE League table
Rules for classification: 1) Points; 2) Goal difference; 3) Goals scored; 4th) head-to-head results; 5th) disciplinary points; 6th) draw
(C) Champions; (P) Promoted

== J3 League ==
Match	Date	Team	Score	Team	Venue	Attendance
1	2016.03.13	Tochigi SC	0-0	Gainare Tottori	Tochigi Green Stadium	5,644
2	2016.03.20	AC Nagano Parceiro	1-0	Tochigi SC	Minami Nagano Sports Park Stadium	7,073
3	2016.04.03	Tochigi SC	2-0	Fujieda MYFC	Tochigi Green Stadium	3,509
4	2016.04.10	Fukushima United FC	2-1	Tochigi SC	Toho Stadium	2,122
5	2016.04.17	Blaublitz Akita	2-1	Tochigi SC	Akigin Stadium	1,339
6	2016.04.24	Tochigi SC	1-0	Kagoshima United FC	Tochigi Green Stadium	2,864
7	2016.05.01	FC Tokyo U-23	1-1	Tochigi SC	Ajinomoto Field Nishigaoka	3,517
8	2016.05.08	Tochigi SC	2-1	Oita Trinita	Tochigi Green Stadium	4,330
9	2016.05.15	Tochigi SC	1-1	Grulla Morioka	Tochigi Green Stadium	3,477
10	2016.05.22	Kataller Toyama	0-1	Tochigi SC	Toyama Stadium	4,469
11	2016.05.29	Tochigi SC	1-0	Cerezo Osaka U-23	Tochigi Green Stadium	4,112
12	2016.06.12	YSCC Yokohama	0-1	Tochigi SC	NHK Spring Mitsuzawa Football Stadium	1,614
13	2016.06.19	Gamba Osaka U-23	2-3	Tochigi SC	Suita City Football Stadium	1,770
14	2016.06.26	Tochigi SC	1-0	FC Ryukyu	Tochigi Green Stadium	4,824
15	2016.07.03	SC Sagamihara	0-2	Tochigi SC	Sagamihara Gion Stadium	3,579
16	2016.07.10	Tochigi SC	2-0	YSCC Yokohama	Tochigi Green Stadium	4,753
17	2016.07.16	Kagoshima United FC	0-1	Tochigi SC	Kagoshima Kamoike Stadium	2,886
18	2016.07.24	Tochigi SC	1-0	Blaublitz Akita	Tochigi Green Stadium	8,586
19	2016.07.31	Oita Trinita	0-1	Tochigi SC	Oita Bank Dome	9,271
20	2016.08.07	Tochigi SC	1-1	FC Tokyo U-23	Tochigi Green Stadium	5,145
21	2016.09.10	Cerezo Osaka U-23	0-3	Tochigi SC	Kincho Stadium	1,119
22	2016.09.18	Tochigi SC	1-1	SC Sagamihara	Tochigi Green Stadium	3,454
23	2016.09.25	Tochigi SC	0-2	Gamba Osaka U-23	Tochigi Green Stadium	4,715
24	2016.10.02	FC Ryukyu	1-1	Tochigi SC	Okinawa Athletic Park Stadium	1,473
25	2016.10.16	Tochigi SC	3-1	Fukushima United FC	Tochigi Green Stadium	5,358
26	2016.10.23	Fujieda MYFC	1-1	Tochigi SC	Shizuoka Stadium	1,694
27	2016.10.30	Tochigi SC	2-0	Kataller Toyama	Tochigi Green Stadium	5,295
28	2016.11.05	Gainare Tottori	0-1	Tochigi SC	Tottori Bank Bird Stadium	1,385
29	2016.11.13	Tochigi SC	0-1	AC Nagano Parceiro	Tochigi Green Stadium	7,690
30	2016.11.20	Grulla Morioka	2-2	Tochigi SC	Iwagin Stadium	2,888
