= Go Nishida =

Japanese footballer

Go Nishida 西田剛
Personal information
- Full name: Go Nishida
- Date of birth: September 14, 1986 (age 40)
- Place of birth: Kagoshima Prefecture, Japan
- Height: 1.77 m (5 ft 9 1/2 in)
- Position: Forward

Team information
- Current team: Ehime FC
- Number: 18

Youth career
- 2002–2004: Kagoshima Jōsei High School
- 2005–2008: Hannan University

Senior career*
Years	Team	Apps	(Gls)
2009–2011	Yokohama FC	92	(13)
2012–2013	Avispa Fukuoka	61	(8)
2014–	Ehime FC	120	(23)
- * Club domestic league appearances and goals as of 1 January 2019

Go Nishida (西田剛, Nishida Gō; born September 14, 1986 in Kagoshima Prefecture) is a Japanese football player for Ehime FC.

== Club statistics ==
Updated to 23 February 2018.

Club performance			League		Cup		Total	
Season	Club	League	Apps	Goals	Apps	Goals	Apps	Goals
Japan			League		Emperor's Cup		Total	
2009	Yokohama FC	J2 League	44	4	2	0	46	5
2010	Yokohama FC	J2 League	29	7	0	0	29	7
2011	Yokohama FC	J2 League	19	2	0	0	19	2
2012	Avispa Fukuoka	J2 League	28	3	0	0	28	3
2013	Avispa Fukuoka	J2 League	33	5	1	0	34	5
2014	Ehime FC	J2 League	30	10	2	0	32	10
2015	Ehime FC	J2 League	37	7	2	0	39	7
2016	Ehime FC	J2 League	16	0	1	0	17	0
2017	Ehime FC	J2 League	21	5	1	0	22	5
Total			257	43	9	0	266	43
