= Hisashi Jogo =

Japanese footballer (born 1986)

Hisashi Jogo 城後寿
Personal information
- Full name: Hisashi Jogo
- Date of birth: 16 April 1986 (age 40)
- Place of birth: Kurume, Fukuoka, Japan
- Height: 1.83 m (6 ft 0 in)
- Position: Midfielder

Team information
- Current team: Avispa Fukuoka
- Number: 10

Youth career
- 2002–2004: Kunimi High School

Senior career*
Years	Team	Apps	(Gls)
2005–	Avispa Fukuoka	498	(84)
- * Club domestic league appearances and goals as of 15 September 2025

Hisashi Jogo (城後 寿, Jogo Hisashi; born 16 April 1986) is a Japanese footballer who plays for Avispa Fukuoka in the J1 League.

== Club career statistics ==
Updated to end of 2022 season.

Club performance			League		Cup		League Cup		Other		Total	
Season	Club	League	Apps	Goals	Apps	Goals	Apps	Goals	Apps	Goals	Apps	Goals
Japan			League		Emperor's Cup		J. League Cup		Other^{1}		Total	
2005	Avispa Fukuoka	J2 League	0	0	2	0	–		–		2	0
2006	Avispa Fukuoka	J1 League	25	4	2	0	4	0	2	0	33	4
2007	Avispa Fukuoka	J2 League	16	2	2	0	–		–		18	2
2008	Avispa Fukuoka	J2 League	27	2	1	0	–		–		28	2
2009	Avispa Fukuoka	J2 League	38	5	1	0	–		–		39	5
2010	Avispa Fukuoka	J2 League	21	8	3	1	–		–		24	9
2011	Avispa Fukuoka	J1 League	31	7	0	0	2	0	–		33	7
2012	Avispa Fukuoka	J2 League	41	12	2	2	–		–		43	14
2013	Avispa Fukuoka	J2 League	35	5	0	0	–		–		35	5
2014	Avispa Fukuoka	J2 League	40	9	0	0	–		–		40	9
2015	Avispa Fukuoka	J2 League	42	8	1	0	–		2	0	45	8
2016	Avispa Fukuoka	J1 League	33	6	1	0	8	2	–		42	8
2017	Avispa Fukuoka	J2 League	26	2	2	1	–		2	0	30	3
2018	Avispa Fukuoka	J2 League	24	6	2	1	–		–		26	7
2019	Avispa Fukuoka	J2 League	36	6	1	0	–		–		37	6
2020	Avispa Fukuoka	J2 League	25	1	–		–		–		25	1
2021	Avispa Fukuoka	J1 League	12	0	1	0	5	3	–		18	3
2022	Avispa Fukuoka	J1 League	6	0	4	1	6	1	–		16	2
Career total			478	83	25	5	25	5	6	0	534	95

^{1}Includes J1 & J2 Playoffs.
