= 2011 Avispa Fukuoka season =

Avispa Fukuoka
2011 season
- Manager: Yoshiyuki Shinoda; Tetsuya Asano
- J. League Division 1: 17th (relegated)
- Emperor's Cup: Third round
- J. League Cup: First round
Home colours	Away colours

The 2011 Avispa Fukuoka season was Avispa Fukuoka's first season in J. League Division 1 since 2006, and 8th overall in the top division. It also includes the 2011 J. League Cup, and the 2011 Emperor's Cup. Avispa Fukuoka finished the J. League season in 17th place and were relegated to the 2012 J. League Division 2.

== Competitions ==
=== J. League ===
==== Final standing ====
Pos	Team	Pld	W	D	L	GF	GA	GD	Pts	Qualification or relegation
14	Albirex Niigata	34	10	9	15	38	46	−8	39	
15	Urawa Red Diamonds	34	8	12	14	36	43	−7	36	
16	Ventforet Kofu (R)	34	9	6	19	42	63	−21	33	Relegation to 2012 J. League Division 2
17	Avispa Fukuoka (R)	34	6	4	24	34	75	−41	22	Relegation to 2012 J. League Division 2
18	Montedio Yamagata (R)	34	5	6	23	23	64	−41	21	Relegation to 2012 J. League Division 2

Updated to match(es) played on December 3, 2011. Source: J.League Division 1
Rules for classification: 1st points; 2nd goal differential; 3rd goals scored; 4th head-to-head results; 5th disciplinary points; 6th draw. If two clubs are tied for first place, both clubs will be declared.
(R) Relegated

==== Results summary ====
5 March 2011 Round 1	Avispa Fukuoka	0–3	Albirex Niigata	LEVEL-5 Stadium
Saturday 14:04		Report	52' Michael, 69' Bruno Lopes, 75' Fujita	Attendance: 10,254; Referee: Kimura

==== Results by round ====
Round	1	2	3	4	5	6	7	8	9	10	11	12	13	14	15	16	17	18	19	20	21	22	23	24	25	26	27	28	29	30	31	32	33	34
Ground	H																																	
Result	L																																	
Position	17																																	

Updated to match(es) played on 6 March 2011. Source: "World-Football.net".
A = Away; H = Home; W = Win; D = Draw; L = Loss

=== Emperor's Cup ===
2011-10-08 Second round	Avispa Fukuoka	3–0	Kōchi University	Fukuyama Takegahana Stadium, Fukuyama
15:00	Nakamachi 14'; Matsuura 31'; Takahashi 64'	Report		Attendance: 938; Referee: Naohito Ogawa

2011-11-16 Third round	Vegalta Sendai	3–1	Avispa Fukuoka	Yurtec Stadium Sendai, Sendai
19:00	Tamura 18', 22'; Nakashima 82'	Report	Okamoto 68'	Attendance: 4,831; Referee: Tomohiro Inoue
