= Kazumasa Takagi =

Japanese footballer

Kazumasa Takagi 高木 和正
Personal information
- Full name: Kazumasa Takagi
- Date of birth: December 17, 1984 (age 41)
- Place of birth: Sanuki, Kagawa, Japan
- Height: 1.70 m (5 ft 7 in)
- Position: Midfielder

Team information
- Current team: Kamatamare Sanuki
- Number: 10

Youth career
- 2000–2002: Kagawa Nishi High School

Senior career*
| Years | Team | Apps | (Gls) |
| 2003–2004 | Sanfrecce Hiroshima | 13 | (0) |
| 2005 | Montedio Yamagata | 8 | (0) |
| 2006–2009 | FC Gifu | 114 | (17) |
| 2010–2013 | Tochigi SC | 128 | (10) |
| 2014– | Kamatamare Sanuki | 156 | (9) |
Medal record
Representing Japan
AFC U-19 Championship
| Silver medal – second place | 2002 Qatar |
- * Club domestic league appearances and goals as of 1 January 2020

Kazumasa Takagi (高木 和正, Takagi Kazumasa; born December 17, 1984) is a Japanese football player who plays for Kamatamare Sanuki.

== Club statistics ==
Updated to 23 February 2020.

| Club performance | | | League | | Cup | | League Cup | | Total | |
| Season | Club | League | Apps | Goals | Apps | Goals | Apps | Goals | Apps | Goals |
| Japan | | | League | | Emperor's Cup | | J. League Cup | | Total | |
|---|---|---|---|---|---|---|---|---|---|---|
| 2003 | Sanfrecce Hiroshima | J2 League | 11 | 0 | 0 | 0 | - | | 11 | 0 |
| 2004 | Sanfrecce Hiroshima | J1 League | 2 | 0 | 0 | 0 | 2 | 0 | 4 | 0 |
| 2005 | Montedio Yamagata | J2 League | 8 | 0 | 0 | 0 | - | | 8 | 0 |
| 2006 | FC Gifu | JRL (Tōkai, Div. 1) | 13 | 4 | 3 | 0 | - | | 16 | 4 |
| 2007 | FC Gifu | JFL | 15 | 3 | 2 | 0 | - | | 17 | 3 |
| 2008 | FC Gifu | J2 League | 39 | 3 | 1 | 0 | - | | 40 | 3 |
| 2009 | FC Gifu | J2 League | 47 | 7 | 3 | 1 | - | | 50 | 8 |
| 2010 | Tochigi SC | J2 League | 35 | 2 | 2 | 1 | - | | 37 | 2 |
| 2011 | Tochigi SC | J2 League | 28 | 3 | 1 | 0 | - | | 29 | 3 |
| 2012 | Tochigi SC | J2 League | 41 | 4 | 1 | 0 | - | | 42 | 4 |
| 2013 | Tochigi SC | J2 League | 24 | 1 | 1 | 0 | - | | 25 | 1 |
| 2014 | Kamatamare Sanuki | J2 League | 28 | 1 | 1 | 0 | - | | 29 | 1 |
| 2015 | Kamatamare Sanuki | J2 League | 21 | 3 | 0 | 0 | – | | 21 | 3 |
| 2016 | Kamatamare Sanuki | J2 League | 37 | 1 | 2 | 0 | – | | 39 | 1 |
| 2017 | Kamatamare Sanuki | J2 League | 37 | 3 | 0 | 0 | – | | 37 | 3 |
| 2018 | Kamatamare Sanuki | J2 League | 23 | 0 | 0 | 0 | – | | 23 | 0 |
| 2019 | Kamatamare Sanuki | J3 League | 10 | 0 | 1 | 0 | – | | 11 | 0 |
| Career total | | | 419 | 39 | 18 | 2 | 2 | 0 | 439 | 41 |
