= Kazuki Yamaguchi (footballer, born 1986) =

Japanese footballer

Personal information
- Date of birth: October 7, 1986 (age 40)
- Place of birth: Fukuoka, Fukuoka, Japan
- Height: 1.86 m (6 ft 1 in)
- Position: Defender

Youth career
- 2005–2008: Fukuoka University

Senior career*
Years	Team	Apps	(Gls)
2009–2014	Avispa Fukuoka	50	(0)
Total		50	(0)
- * Club domestic league appearances and goals

Kazuki Yamaguchi (山口 和樹, Yamaguchi Kazuki; born October 7, 1986) is a former Japanese football player.

== Club statistics ==
Club performance			League		Cup		League Cup		Total	
Season	Club	League	Apps	Goals	Apps	Goals	Apps	Goals	Apps	Goals
Japan			League		Emperor's Cup		League Cup		Total	
2009	Avispa Fukuoka	J2 League	1	0	0	0	-		1	0
2010	Avispa Fukuoka	J2 League	1	0	1	0	-		2	0
2011	Avispa Fukuoka	J1 League	14	0	1	0	1	0	16	0
2012	Avispa Fukuoka	J2 League	14	0	2	0	-	-	16	0
2013	Avispa Fukuoka	J2 League	14	0	1	0	-		15	0
Career total			44	0	5	0	1	0	49	0
