= 2011 Thespa Kusatsu season =

Thespa Kusatsu
2011 season
- Manager: Hiroshi Soejima
- Stadium: Shoda Shoyu Stadium Gunma
- J2 League: 9 th

2011 Thespa Kusatsu season.

== J2 League ==
Match	Date	Team	Score	Team	Venue	Attendance
1	2011.03.06	Tochigi SC	2-1	Thespa Kusatsu	Tochigi Green Stadium	6,144
8	2011.04.24	Oita Trinita	1-2	Thespa Kusatsu	Oita Bank Dome	9,537
9	2011.04.30	Thespa Kusatsu	1-0	Roasso Kumamoto	Shoda Shoyu Stadium Gunma	3,258
10	2011.05.04	Consadole Sapporo	1-0	Thespa Kusatsu	Sapporo Dome	12,386
11	2011.05.08	Thespa Kusatsu	1-2	Fagiano Okayama	Shoda Shoyu Stadium Gunma	2,416
12	2011.05.14	Thespa Kusatsu	2-1	FC Tokyo	Shoda Shoyu Stadium Gunma	6,520
13	2011.05.22	Kataller Toyama	2-3	Thespa Kusatsu	Kataller Toyama	2,985
14	2011.05.29	Shonan Bellmare	2-0	Thespa Kusatsu	Hiratsuka Stadium	4,705
15	2011.06.04	Thespa Kusatsu	3-1	JEF United Chiba	Shoda Shoyu Stadium Gunma	6,054
16	2011.06.12	Tokyo Verdy	1-3	Thespa Kusatsu	Ajinomoto Stadium	4,199
17	2011.06.19	Thespa Kusatsu	2-4	Kyoto Sanga FC	Shoda Shoyu Stadium Gunma	3,106
18	2011.06.26	Giravanz Kitakyushu	2-1	Thespa Kusatsu	Honjo Stadium	2,340
2	2011.06.29	Thespa Kusatsu	0-0	Ehime FC	Shoda Shoyu Stadium Gunma	1,458
19	2011.07.02	Thespa Kusatsu	1-2	Mito HollyHock	Shoda Shoyu Stadium Gunma	3,654
20	2011.07.09	Tokushima Vortis	3-0	Thespa Kusatsu	Pocarisweat Stadium	3,801
21	2011.07.18	Thespa Kusatsu	0-5	Gainare Tottori	Shoda Shoyu Stadium Gunma	1,979
22	2011.07.24	Fagiano Okayama	1-2	Thespa Kusatsu	Kanko Stadium	8,344
23	2011.07.31	Thespa Kusatsu	0-0	Sagan Tosu	Shoda Shoyu Stadium Gunma	3,544
3	2011.08.06	Sagan Tosu	1-2	Thespa Kusatsu	Best Amenity Stadium	4,497
24	2011.08.13	FC Tokyo	1-0	Thespa Kusatsu	Ajinomoto Stadium	20,790
25	2011.08.21	Thespa Kusatsu	1-0	Shonan Bellmare	Shoda Shoyu Stadium Gunma	3,018
26	2011.08.27	Yokohama FC	2-0	Thespa Kusatsu	NHK Spring Mitsuzawa Football Stadium	4,230
4	2011.08.31	Thespa Kusatsu	2-0	Tokushima Vortis	Shoda Shoyu Stadium Gunma	1,266
27	2011.09.11	Thespa Kusatsu	0-0	Tokyo Verdy	Kumagaya Athletic Stadium	3,382
28	2011.09.18	Kyoto Sanga FC	3-1	Thespa Kusatsu	Kyoto Nishikyogoku Athletic Stadium	5,787
29	2011.09.23	Thespa Kusatsu	1-1	Oita Trinita	Shoda Shoyu Stadium Gunma	2,864
5	2011.09.28	Gainare Tottori	1-1	Thespa Kusatsu	Tottori Bank Bird Stadium	1,787
30	2011.10.01	Roasso Kumamoto	1-0	Thespa Kusatsu	Roasso Kumamoto	6,797
31	2011.10.16	JEF United Chiba	2-3	Thespa Kusatsu	Fukuda Denshi Arena	8,902
6	2011.10.19	Thespa Kusatsu	4-2	FC Gifu	Shoda Shoyu Stadium Gunma	1,348
32	2011.10.23	Thespa Kusatsu	2-2	Giravanz Kitakyushu	Shoda Shoyu Stadium Gunma	4,076
7	2011.10.26	Thespa Kusatsu	1-1	Yokohama FC	Shoda Shoyu Stadium Gunma	2,064
33	2011.10.30	Mito HollyHock	2-2	Thespa Kusatsu	K's denki Stadium Mito	4,050
34	2011.11.06	Thespa Kusatsu	0-0	Kataller Toyama	Shoda Shoyu Stadium Gunma	2,200
35	2011.11.13	FC Gifu	0-1	Thespa Kusatsu	Gifu Nagaragawa Stadium	4,149
36	2011.11.20	Thespa Kusatsu	2-1	Consadole Sapporo	Shoda Shoyu Stadium Gunma	5,565
37	2011.11.27	Ehime FC	1-2	Thespa Kusatsu	Ningineer Stadium	3,963
38	2011.12.03	Thespa Kusatsu	4-0	Tochigi SC	Shoda Shoyu Stadium Gunma	3,246
