= 2013 Ehime FC season =

Ehime FC
2013 season
- Manager: Kiyotaka Ishimaru
- Stadium: Ningineer Stadium
- J2 League: 17th

2013 Ehime FC season.

== J2 League ==
Match	Date	Team	Score	Team	Venue	Attendance
1	2013.03.03	Ehime FC	3-1	Montedio Yamagata	Ningineer Stadium	4,474
2	2013.03.10	Ehime FC	1-1	Matsumoto Yamaga FC	Ningineer Stadium	3,325
3	2013.03.17	Kataller Toyama	1-0	Ehime FC	Toyama Stadium	5,069
4	2013.03.20	Ehime FC	0-0	FC Gifu	Ningineer Stadium	2,159
5	2013.03.24	Mito HollyHock	0-1	Ehime FC	K's denki Stadium Mito	2,584
6	2013.03.31	Ehime FC	0-1	Fagiano Okayama	Ningineer Stadium	3,776
7	2013.04.07	Giravanz Kitakyushu	1-0	Ehime FC	Honjo Stadium	1,607
8	2013.04.14	Ehime FC	2-0	Thespakusatsu Gunma	Ningineer Stadium	2,124
9	2013.04.17	Roasso Kumamoto	0-1	Ehime FC	Umakana-Yokana Stadium	3,501
10	2013.04.21	Tokushima Vortis	3-2	Ehime FC	Pocarisweat Stadium	5,215
11	2013.04.29	Ehime FC	0-2	V-Varen Nagasaki	Ningineer Stadium	3,918
12	2013.05.03	JEF United Chiba	2-0	Ehime FC	Fukuda Denshi Arena	10,296
13	2013.05.06	Ehime FC	3-0	Tochigi SC	Ningineer Stadium	2,413
14	2013.05.12	Yokohama FC	0-0	Ehime FC	NHK Spring Mitsuzawa Football Stadium	5,024
15	2013.05.19	Ehime FC	2-4	Vissel Kobe	Ningineer Stadium	3,923
16	2013.05.26	Ehime FC	1-2	Gamba Osaka	Ningineer Stadium	10,381
17	2013.06.01	Tokyo Verdy	2-1	Ehime FC	Ajinomoto Stadium	4,268
18	2013.06.08	Ehime FC	3-2	Consadole Sapporo	Ningineer Stadium	5,544
19	2013.06.15	Kyoto Sanga FC	4-1	Ehime FC	Kyoto Nishikyogoku Athletic Stadium	10,643
20	2013.06.22	Avispa Fukuoka	2-0	Ehime FC	Level5 Stadium	5,318
21	2013.06.29	Ehime FC	1-0	Gainare Tottori	Ningineer Stadium	3,054
22	2013.07.03	Ehime FC	1-1	Roasso Kumamoto	Ningineer Stadium	1,104
23	2013.07.07	Vissel Kobe	2-0	Ehime FC	Noevir Stadium Kobe	10,160
24	2013.07.14	Ehime FC	0-2	Tokushima Vortis	Ningineer Stadium	6,516
25	2013.07.20	Ehime FC	0-1	JEF United Chiba	Ningineer Stadium	3,674
27	2013.08.04	V-Varen Nagasaki	1-1	Ehime FC	Nagasaki Stadium	3,565
28	2013.08.11	Ehime FC	2-0	Kyoto Sanga FC	Ningineer Stadium	4,048
29	2013.08.18	Ehime FC	3-0	Giravanz Kitakyushu	Ningineer Stadium	3,336
30	2013.08.21	Consadole Sapporo	3-0	Ehime FC	Sapporo Atsubetsu Stadium	5,664
31	2013.08.25	Thespakusatsu Gunma	2-1	Ehime FC	Shoda Shoyu Stadium Gunma	2,496
32	2013.09.01	Ehime FC	0-0	Kataller Toyama	Ningineer Stadium	1,809
26	2013.09.11	Tochigi SC	0-1	Ehime FC	Tochigi Green Stadium	2,499
33	2013.09.15	Gainare Tottori	1-1	Ehime FC	Tottori Bank Bird Stadium	2,223
34	2013.09.23	Ehime FC	0-1	Yokohama FC	Ningineer Stadium	4,251
35	2013.09.29	Gamba Osaka	0-1	Ehime FC	Expo '70 Commemorative Stadium	12,671
36	2013.10.06	Ehime FC	4-0	Tokyo Verdy	Ningineer Stadium	6,060
37	2013.10.20	Fagiano Okayama	1-1	Ehime FC	Kanko Stadium	6,705
38	2013.10.27	Montedio Yamagata	3-0	Ehime FC	ND Soft Stadium Yamagata	5,795
39	2013.11.03	Ehime FC	2-2	Mito HollyHock	Ningineer Stadium	2,934
40	2013.11.10	FC Gifu	1-1	Ehime FC	Gifu Nagaragawa Stadium	2,856
41	2013.11.17	Ehime FC	2-2	Avispa Fukuoka	Ningineer Stadium	4,129
42	2013.11.24	Matsumoto Yamaga FC	1-0	Ehime FC	Matsumotodaira Park Stadium	16,885
