= Toshiya Tanaka (footballer, born 1984) =

Japanese footballer

Toshiya Tanaka 田中 俊也
Personal information
- Full name: Toshiya Tanaka
- Date of birth: November 12, 1984 (age 41)
- Place of birth: Kanazawa, Japan
- Height: 1.76 m (5 ft 9 1/2 in)
- Position: Forward

Youth career
- 2000–2002: Seiryo High School

Senior career*
| Years | Team | Apps | (Gls) |
| 2003–2005 | Sanfrecce Hiroshima | 6 | (1) |
| 2005–2009 | Ehime FC | 162 | (31) |
| 2010 | Zweigen Kanazawa | 12 | (2) |
| Total | | 180 | (34) |
- * Club domestic league appearances and goals

Toshiya Tanaka (田中 俊也, Tanaka Toshiya; born November 12, 1984) is a former Japanese football player.

== Career statistics ==
Appearances and goals by club, season and competition
| Club | Season | League | | | Emperor's Cup | | J.League Cup | | Total | |
| Club | Season | Division | Apps | Goals | Apps | Goals | Apps | Goals | Apps | Goals |
|---|---|---|---|---|---|---|---|---|---|---|
| Sanfrecce Hiroshima | 2003 | J2 League | 0 | 0 | 0 | 0 | — | | 0 | 0 |
| Sanfrecce Hiroshima | 2004 | J1 League | 6 | 1 | 0 | 0 | 1 | 0 | 7 | 1 |
| Sanfrecce Hiroshima | 2005 | J1 League | 0 | 0 | 0 | 0 | 0 | 0 | 0 | 0 |
| Ehime FC | 2005 | Football League | 11 | 2 | 3 | 3 | — | | 14 | 5 |
| Ehime FC | 2006 | J2 League | 47 | 14 | 2 | 1 | — | | 49 | 15 |
| Ehime FC | 2007 | J2 League | 28 | 5 | 3 | 2 | — | | 31 | 7 |
| Ehime FC | 2008 | J2 League | 35 | 7 | 1 | 0 | — | | 36 | 7 |
| Ehime FC | 2009 | J2 League | 41 | 3 | 1 | 0 | — | | 42 | 3 |
| Zweigen Kanazawa | 2010 | Football League | 12 | 2 | 0 | 0 | — | | 12 | 2 |
| Career total | | | 180 | 34 | 10 | 6 | 1 | 0 | 191 | 40 |
