= Toshiya Sueyoshi =

Japanese footballer (born 1987)

Toshiya Sueyoshi 末吉 隼也
Personal information
- Full name: Toshiya Sueyoshi
- Date of birth: 18 November 1987 (age 39)
- Place of birth: Kitakyushu, Japan
- Height: 1.74 m (5 ft 8 1/2 in)
- Position: Midfielder

Youth career
- 2006–2009: Fukuoka University

Senior career*
| Years | Team | Apps | (Gls) |
| 2010–2012 | Avispa Fukuoka | 92 | (4) |
| 2013–2014 | Sagan Tosu | 7 | (0) |
| 2014 | → Oita Trinita (loan) | 36 | (3) |
| 2015–2017 | Avispa Fukuoka | 67 | (4) |
| 2018–2019 | Fagiano Okayama | 25 | (0) |
| 2019 | SC Sagamihara | 25 | (1) |
- * Club domestic league appearances and goals as of 15 January 2020

Toshiya Sueyoshi (末吉 隼也, Sueyoshi Toshiya; born 18 November 1987 in Fukuoka) is a former Japanese former football player.

== Career ==
Signed by Avispa Fukuoka after playing as a student at Fukuoka University, he was declared J2 Rookie of the Year in his first season at the club. Sueyoshi retired at the end of the 2019 season.

== Club statistics ==
Updated to 23 February 2020.

| Club performance | | | League | | Cup | | League Cup | | Total | |
| Season | Club | League | Apps | Goals | Apps | Goals | Apps | Goals | Apps | Goals |
| Japan | | | League | | Emperor's Cup | | League Cup | | Total | |
|---|---|---|---|---|---|---|---|---|---|---|
| 2010 | Avispa Fukuoka | J2 League | 31 | 1 | 3 | 0 | - | | 34 | 1 |
| 2011 | Avispa Fukuoka | J1 League | 29 | 2 | 2 | 0 | 2 | 0 | 31 | 2 |
| 2012 | Avispa Fukuoka | J2 League | 32 | 1 | 2 | 0 | - | | 34 | 1 |
| 2013 | Sagan Tosu | J1 League | 7 | 0 | 0 | 0 | 4 | 0 | 11 | 0 |
| 2014 | Oita Trinita | J2 League | 36 | 3 | 2 | 0 | - | | 38 | 3 |
| 2015 | Avispa Fukuoka | J2 League | 39 | 4 | 1 | 0 | - | | 40 | 4 |
| 2016 | Avispa Fukuoka | J1 League | 24 | 0 | 2 | 1 | 4 | 0 | 29 | 1 |
| 2017 | Avispa Fukuoka | J2 League | 4 | 0 | 2 | 0 | - | | 6 | 0 |
| 2018 | Fagiano Okayama | J2 League | 25 | 0 | 1 | 0 | - | | 26 | 0 |
| 2019 | SC Sagamihara | J3 League | 25 | 1 | - | | - | | 25 | 1 |
| Career total | | | 252 | 12 | 15 | 1 | 10 | 0 | 276 | 13 |
