= Takeshi Ono (footballer, born 1962) =

Japanese footballer and manager

Takeshi Ono 小野 剛
Personal information
- Full name: Takeshi Ono
- Date of birth: August 17, 1962 (age 64)
- Place of birth: Chiba, Japan

Youth career
- Years: Team
- 1978–1980: Chiba Funabashi High School
- 1981–1984: University of Tsukuba

Managerial career
- 2002–2006: Sanfrecce Hiroshima
- 2014–2015: Roasso Kumamoto
- 2019: FC Imabari

Takeshi Ono (小野 剛, Ono Takeshi; born August 17, 1962) is a former Japanese football player and manager.

== Coaching career ==
Ono became assistant coach of Japan national team under the manager; Takeshi Okada from 1997 to 1998. From 1999, he became assistant coach of Japan U-20 national team. In 2002, he became manager of Sanfrecce Hiroshima. In 2012, he became assistant coach of Chinese club; Hangzhou Greentown under the manager; Takeshi Okada. In 2014, he became manager Roasso Kumamoto. In 2016, he became assistant coach of Hangzhou Greentown again.

== Managerial statistics ==
Team	From	To	Record				
Team	From	To	G	W	D	L	Win %
Sanfrecce Hiroshima	2003	2006	116	44	38	34	37.93
Roasso Kumamoto	2014	2015	84	26	29	29	30.95
FC Imabari	2019		0	0	0	0	—
Roasso Kumamoto			0	0	0	0	—
Total			200	70	67	63	35.00
