= Jun Suzuki (footballer, born 1989) =

Japanese footballer

Jun Suzuki 鈴木 惇
Personal information
- Date of birth: 22 April 1989 (age 37)
- Place of birth: Higashi-ku, Fukuoka, Japan
- Height: 1.68 m (5 ft 6 in)
- Position: Midfielder

Youth career
- 2005–2007: Avispa Fukuoka

Senior career*
Years	Team	Apps	(Gls)
2007–2012	Avispa Fukuoka	151	(6)
2013–2014	Tokyo Verdy	73	(2)
2015–2021	Avispa Fukuoka	143	(17)
2017	→ Oita Trinita (loan)	39	(5)
2021–2023	Fujieda MYFC	58	(4)
2023	Sūduva	29	(0)

International career
2007–2008	Japan U19	8	(1)
- * Club domestic league appearances and goals

Jun Suzuki (鈴木 惇, Suzuki Jun; born 22 April 1989) is a Japanese former football player.

== Career statistics ==
Updated to end of 2018 season.

Club performance			League		Cup		League Cup		Total	
Season	Club	League	Apps	Goals	Apps	Goals	Apps	Goals	Apps	Goals
Japan			League		Emperor's Cup		League Cup		Total	
2007	Avispa Fukuoka	J2 League	4	0	0	0	-		4	0
2008	Avispa Fukuoka	J2 League	18	1	0	0	-		18	1
2009	Avispa Fukuoka	J2 League	39	0	2	0	-		41	0
2010	Avispa Fukuoka	J2 League	24	1	2	0	-		26	1
2011	Avispa Fukuoka	J1 League	30	1	0	0	2	0	32	1
2012	Avispa Fukuoka	J2 League	36	3	1	0	-		37	3
2013	Tokyo Verdy	J2 League	39	1	2	0	-		41	1
2014	Tokyo Verdy	J2 League	34	1	1	0	-		35	1
2015	Avispa Fukuoka	J2 League	36	9	2	0	–		38	9
2016	Avispa Fukuoka	J1 League	9	0	2	0	5	0	16	0
2017	Oita Trinita	J2 League	39	5	0	0	–		39	5
2018	Avispa Fukuoka	J2 League	41	6	1	0	–		42	6
Career total			349	28	13	0	7	0	369	28
