= List of Japanese football transfers winter 2009–10 =

This is a list of Japanese football transfers in the winter transfer window 2009–10 by club.

== J.League Division 1 ==
=== Albirex Niigata ===
In: Note: Flags indicate national team as defined under FIFA eligibility rules; some limited exceptions apply. Players may hold more than one non-FIFA nationality.

No.	Pos.	Nation	Player

Out: Note: Flags indicate national team as defined under FIFA eligibility rules; some limited exceptions apply. Players may hold more than one non-FIFA nationality.

No.	Pos.	Nation	Player
—	MF	JPN	Jun Marques Davidson (Released, free agent)
—	DF	JPN	Naoto Matsuo (to Shonan Bellmare)

=== Kashima Antlers ===
In: Note: Flags indicate national team as defined under FIFA eligibility rules; some limited exceptions apply. Players may hold more than one non-FIFA nationality.

No.	Pos.	Nation	Player

Out: Note: Flags indicate national team as defined under FIFA eligibility rules; some limited exceptions apply. Players may hold more than one non-FIFA nationality.

No.	Pos.	Nation	Player
35	MF	KOR	Park Joo-Ho (to Júbilo Iwata)

=== Omiya Ardija ===
In: Note: Flags indicate national team as defined under FIFA eligibility rules; some limited exceptions apply. Players may hold more than one non-FIFA nationality.

No.	Pos.	Nation	Player
—	MF	JPN	Yusuke Shimada (from Sagan Tosu)

Out: Note: Flags indicate national team as defined under FIFA eligibility rules; some limited exceptions apply. Players may hold more than one non-FIFA nationality.

No.	Pos.	Nation	Player
1	GK	JPN	Takahiro Takagi (Released, free agent)
4	DF	JPN	Yasuhiro Hato (Released, free agent)
5	DF	JPN	Daisuke Tomita (Released, free agent)
19	DF	JPN	Yusuke Murayama (Released, free agent)
—	MF	JPN	Takaya Kawanabe (Released, free agent)
—	GK	JPN	Nobuhisa Kobayashi (Released, free agent)
—	DF	JPN	Haruki Nishimura (Released, free agent)

=== Shonan Bellmare ===
In: Note: Flags indicate national team as defined under FIFA eligibility rules; some limited exceptions apply. Players may hold more than one non-FIFA nationality.

No.	Pos.	Nation	Player

Out: Note: Flags indicate national team as defined under FIFA eligibility rules; some limited exceptions apply. Players may hold more than one non-FIFA nationality.

No.	Pos.	Nation	Player
13	MF	JPN	Shota Suzuki (Released, free agent)
20	FW	JPN	Ryuta Hara (Released, free agent)
27	DF	JPN	Keisuke Takigawa (Released, free agent)
33	MF	JPN	Kai Harada (Released, free agent)
—	FW	JPN	Kohei Yamamoto (Released, free agent)
1	GK	JPN	Tomohiko Ito (Retired)

=== Cerezo Osaka ===
In: Note: Flags indicate national team as defined under FIFA eligibility rules; some limited exceptions apply. Players may hold more than one non-FIFA nationality.

No.	Pos.	Nation	Player
—	DF	JPN	Takahiro Ogihara (from Cerezo Osaka U-18)
—	FW	JPN	Ryo Nagai (from Cerezo Osaka U-18)
—	GK	JPN	Kenjiro Ogino (from Mineyama High School)
—	DF	JPN	Taikai Uemoto (from Oita Trinita)
—	FW	JPN	Daisuke Takahashi (from Oita Trinita)
—	GK	JPN	Kenya Matsui (from Júbilo Iwata)
—	DF	JPN	Teruyuki Moniwa (from FC Tokyo)
—	FW	JPN	Ryuji Bando (from Gamba Osaka)
—	MF	JPN	Hiroshi Kiyotake (from Oita Trinita)

Out: Note: Flags indicate national team as defined under FIFA eligibility rules; some limited exceptions apply. Players may hold more than one non-FIFA nationality.

No.	Pos.	Nation	Player
20	FW	JPN	Akinori Nishizawa (Retired)
22	GK	JPN	Masahito Suzuki (Retired)
14	DF	JPN	Kenjiro Ezoe (on loan to Kataller Toyama)
29	FW	JPN	Takuya Kokeguchi (to Kataller Toyama)
3	DF	BRA	Thiago Martinelli da Silva (Released, free agent)
11	MF	JPN	Yuji Funayama (loan return to Kashima Antlers)
1	GK	JPN	Daisuke Tada (on loan to Omiya Ardija)
24	FW	JPN	Kento Shiratani (on loan to Mito HollyHock)

=== Kawasaki Frontale ===
In: Note: Flags indicate national team as defined under FIFA eligibility rules; some limited exceptions apply. Players may hold more than one non-FIFA nationality.

No.	Pos.	Nation	Player
3	DF	JPN	Hideki Sahara (Loan return from FC Tokyo)
8	DF	JPN	Takanobu Komiyama (Transferred from Yokohama F. Marinos)
16	MF	JPN	Junpei Kusukami (Drafted from Doshisha University)
20	DF	JPN	Junichi Inamoto (Transferred from Stade Rennais F.C.)
24	FW	JPN	Yu Kobayashi (Drafted from Takushoku University)
26	FW	JPN	Hidenobu Takasu (Drafted from Osaka Tōin High School)

Out: Note: Flags indicate national team as defined under FIFA eligibility rules; some limited exceptions apply. Players may hold more than one non-FIFA nationality.

No.	Pos.	Nation	Player
—	GK	JPN	Shinya Yoshihara (Transferred to Kashiwa Reysol)
—	MF	JPN	Kazuhiro Murakami (Transferred to Omiya Ardija)
—	MF	JPN	Satoru Yamagishi (On loan to Sanfrecce Hiroshima)
—	FW	JPN	Satoshi Kukino (On loan to Yokohama FC)
—	MF	JPN	Yuji Yabu (On loan to Ventforet Kofu)
—	MF	JPN	Kyohei Sugiura (On loan to Ehime FC)

=== Gamba Osaka ===
In: Note: Flags indicate national team as defined under FIFA eligibility rules; some limited exceptions apply. Players may hold more than one non-FIFA nationality.

No.	Pos.	Nation	Player
—	GK	JPN	Kohei Kawata (from Fukuoka University)
—	MF	JPN	Shigeru Yokotani (loan return from Ehime FC)
—	FW	BRA	Zé Carlos (from Portuguesa)
—	FW	BRA	Dodo (from Ehime FC)

Out: Note: Flags indicate national team as defined under FIFA eligibility rules; some limited exceptions apply. Players may hold more than one non-FIFA nationality.

No.	Pos.	Nation	Player
—	DF	KOR	Park Dong-Hyuk (to Kashiwa Reysol)
—	GK	JPN	Masaki Kinoshita (to Roasso Kumamoto)
—	MF	JPN	Masafumi Maeda (to Thespa Kusatsu)
1	GK	JPN	Naoki Matsuyo (Retired)
11	FW	JPN	Ryuji Bando (to Cerezo Osaka)
20	MF	JPN	Shu Kurata (on loan to JEF United Ichihara Chiba)
30	FW	JPN	Masato Yamazaki (on loan to Sanfrecce Hiroshima)
—	FW	JPN	Hideya Okamoto (to Avispa Fukuoka)
8	MF	JPN	Shinichi Terada (on loan to Yokohama FC)
—	MF	JPN	Akihiro Ienaga (on loan to Cerezo Osaka)

=== Nagoya Grampus ===
In: Note: Flags indicate national team as defined under FIFA eligibility rules; some limited exceptions apply. Players may hold more than one non-FIFA nationality.

No.	Pos.	Nation	Player
—	DF	JPN	Tatsuya Arai (from Chuo University)
—	MF	JPN	Mu Kanazaki (from Oita Trinita)
—	DF	JPN	Marcus Tulio Tanaka (from Urawa Reds)

Out: Note: Flags indicate national team as defined under FIFA eligibility rules; some limited exceptions apply. Players may hold more than one non-FIFA nationality.

No.	Pos.	Nation	Player
13	MF	JPN	Kei Yamaguchi (Released, free agent)
25	FW	JPN	Oribe Niikawa (Released, free agent)
30	GK	JPN	Koichi Hirono (Retired)
—	DF	JPN	Kazuto Tsuyuki (Released (after loan to Tokushima Vortis), free agent)
3	DF	SRB	Miloš Bajalica (Released, free agent)
4	DF	JPN	Maya Yoshida (To VVV-Venlo)

=== Júbilo Iwata ===
In: Note: Flags indicate national team as defined under FIFA eligibility rules; some limited exceptions apply. Players may hold more than one non-FIFA nationality.

No.	Pos.	Nation	Player
—	DF	KOR	Lee Gang-Jin (from Busan I'Park)
—	MF	KOR	Park Joo-Ho (from Kashima Antlers)

Out: Note: Flags indicate national team as defined under FIFA eligibility rules; some limited exceptions apply. Players may hold more than one non-FIFA nationality.

No.	Pos.	Nation	Player

=== Montedio Yamagata ===
In: Note: Flags indicate national team as defined under FIFA eligibility rules; some limited exceptions apply. Players may hold more than one non-FIFA nationality.

No.	Pos.	Nation	Player

Out: Note: Flags indicate national team as defined under FIFA eligibility rules; some limited exceptions apply. Players may hold more than one non-FIFA nationality.

No.	Pos.	Nation	Player

=== Sanfrecce Hiroshima ===
In: Note: Flags indicate national team as defined under FIFA eligibility rules; some limited exceptions apply. Players may hold more than one non-FIFA nationality.

No.	Pos.	Nation	Player
—	DF	JPN	Hironori Ishikawa (from Ryutsu Keizai University FC)
38	FW	JPN	Junya Osaki (from Sanfrecce Hiroshima Youth)
—	MF	JPN	Satoru Yamagishi (on loan from Kawasaki Frontale)
—	GK	JPN	Shusaku Nishikawa (from Oita Trinita)
—	FW	JPN	Masato Yamazaki (on loan from Gamba Osaka)

Out: Note: Flags indicate national team as defined under FIFA eligibility rules; some limited exceptions apply. Players may hold more than one non-FIFA nationality.

No.	Pos.	Nation	Player
16	MF	PRK	Ri Han-Jae (to Consadole Sapporo)
33	MF	JPN	Takashi Rakuyama (Released, free agent)
10	MF	JPN	Yosuke Kashiwagi (to Urawa Reds)
3	DF	JPN	Shogo Nishikawa (to Montedio Yamagata)
18	FW	JPN	Ryuichi Hirashige (on loan to Tokushima Vortis)
26	DF	JPN	Yuya Hashiuchi (on loan to Tokushima Vortis)
39	FW	JPN	Tatsuhiko Kubo (to Zweigen Kanazawa)

=== Kyoto Sanga FC ===
In: Note: Flags indicate national team as defined under FIFA eligibility rules; some limited exceptions apply. Players may hold more than one non-FIFA nationality.

No.	Pos.	Nation	Player
—	GK	JPN	Tsuyoshi Kodama (from Kansai University)
—	DF	JPN	Takayuki Fukumura (from Osaka Toin High School)
—	DF	KOR	Kwak Tae-Hwi (from Chunnam Dragons)
—	MF	BRA	Sergio Dutra Junior (from Santo André)
—	DF	BRA	William Thiego de Jesus (On loan from Gremio)
—	MF	JPN	Shingo Suzuki (from Oita Trinita)
—	MF	JPN	Yosuke Kataoka (from Omiya Ardija)

Out: Note: Flags indicate national team as defined under FIFA eligibility rules; some limited exceptions apply. Players may hold more than one non-FIFA nationality.

No.	Pos.	Nation	Player
5	DF	JPN	Kazuki Teshima (retire)
—	DF	BRA	Sidiclei de Souza (Released, free agent)
—	FW	JPN	Takenori Hayashi (Released, free agent)
9	FW	JPN	Yohei Toyoda (on loan to Sagan Tosu)

=== Shimizu S-Pulse ===
In: Note: Flags indicate national team as defined under FIFA eligibility rules; some limited exceptions apply. Players may hold more than one non-FIFA nationality.

No.	Pos.	Nation	Player
—	MF	JPN	Shinji Ono (from VfL Bochum) (Note: "Maric kommt, Ono geht" (in German). DFL. 2010-01-09.)

Out: Note: Flags indicate national team as defined under FIFA eligibility rules; some limited exceptions apply. Players may hold more than one non-FIFA nationality.

No.	Pos.	Nation	Player

=== FC Tokyo ===
In: Note: Flags indicate national team as defined under FIFA eligibility rules; some limited exceptions apply. Players may hold more than one non-FIFA nationality.

No.	Pos.	Nation	Player
—	DF	JPN	Masato Morishige (from Oita Trinita)

Out: Note: Flags indicate national team as defined under FIFA eligibility rules; some limited exceptions apply. Players may hold more than one non-FIFA nationality.

No.	Pos.	Nation	Player
4	DF	BRA	Bruno Quadros (Released, free agent)
7	MF	JPN	Satoru Asari (retire)
8	DF	JPN	Ryuji Fujiyama (to Consadole Sapporo)

=== Urawa Red Diamonds ===
In: Note: Flags indicate national team as defined under FIFA eligibility rules; some limited exceptions apply. Players may hold more than one non-FIFA nationality.

No.	Pos.	Nation	Player
—	MF	JPN	Tomoya Ugajin (from Ryutsu Keizai University FC)
—	DF	AUS	Matthew Špiranović (on loan from 1. FC Nürnberg)

Out: Note: Flags indicate national team as defined under FIFA eligibility rules; some limited exceptions apply. Players may hold more than one non-FIFA nationality.

No.	Pos.	Nation	Player
31	DF	JPN	Masato Hashimoto (On loan to Tochigi SC)
—	MF	JPN	Takafumi Akahoshi (Released, free agent)

=== Vegalta Sendai ===
In: Note: Flags indicate national team as defined under FIFA eligibility rules; some limited exceptions apply. Players may hold more than one non-FIFA nationality.

No.	Pos.	Nation	Player

Out: Note: Flags indicate national team as defined under FIFA eligibility rules; some limited exceptions apply. Players may hold more than one non-FIFA nationality.

No.	Pos.	Nation	Player

=== Vissel Kobe ===
In: Note: Flags indicate national team as defined under FIFA eligibility rules; some limited exceptions apply. Players may hold more than one non-FIFA nationality.

No.	Pos.	Nation	Player
—	FW	JPN	Koki Arita (from Hokuetsu High School)
—	MF	KOR	Kim Tae-yeon (loan return from Mito HollyHock)

Out: Note: Flags indicate national team as defined under FIFA eligibility rules; some limited exceptions apply. Players may hold more than one non-FIFA nationality.

No.	Pos.	Nation	Player
8	MF	BRA	Alan Bahia (loan return to Atlético-PR)
9	FW	BRA	Marcel (loan return to Benfica)
11	FW	JPN	Shota Matsuhashi (Released, free agent)
15	DF	JPN	Toshihiko Uchiyama (Released, free agent)
16	MF	JPN	Seiji Koga (Released, free agent)
19	FW	JPN	Daisuke Sudo (Released, free agent)
27	FW	JPN	Hiroki Kishida (to Fagiano Okayama)
32	FW	JPN	Nobuhiro Uetani (Released, free agent)
33	DF	JPN	Ryuhei Niwa (Released, free agent)
—	DF	JPN	Noriaki Ishizawa (on loan to FC Mio Biwako)
—	GK	JPN	Kohei Doi (Released, free agent)
—	MF	KOR	Kim Tae-yeon (Released, free agent)

=== Yokohama F. Marinos ===
In: Note: Flags indicate national team as defined under FIFA eligibility rules; some limited exceptions apply. Players may hold more than one non-FIFA nationality.

No.	Pos.	Nation	Player

Out: Note: Flags indicate national team as defined under FIFA eligibility rules; some limited exceptions apply. Players may hold more than one non-FIFA nationality.

No.	Pos.	Nation	Player

== J.League Division 2 ==
=== Avispa Fukuoka ===
In: Note: Flags indicate national team as defined under FIFA eligibility rules; some limited exceptions apply. Players may hold more than one non-FIFA nationality.

No.	Pos.	Nation	Player
14	MF	JPN	Genki Nagasato (from Tokyo Verdy)
15	MF	JPN	Kosuke Nakamachi (from Keio University)
18	FW	JPN	Masato Yoshihara (from Avispa Fukuoka U-18)
20	DF	JPN	Yosuke Miyaji (from Fukuoka University)
22	MF	JPN	Toshiya Sueyoshi (from Fukuoka University)
24	DF	JPN	Kenta Hiraishi (from FC Ube Yahhh-man)
26	DF	PRK	Son Jeong-ryun (from Avispa Fukuoka U-18)

Out: Note: Flags indicate national team as defined under FIFA eligibility rules; some limited exceptions apply. Players may hold more than one non-FIFA nationality.

No.	Pos.	Nation	Player
2	DF	JPN	Toru Miyamoto (to Tochigi SC)
5	DF	JPN	Satoshi Nagano (to Giravanz Kitakyushu)
6	MF	JPN	Wellington (to Giravanz Kitakyushu)
9	FW	JPN	Teruaki Kurobe (to Kataller Toyama)
14	MF	JPN	Daisuke Nakaharai (Released, free agent)
15	FW	BRA	Alex (Released, free agent)
16	MF	JPN	Tatsunori Hisanaga (Released, free agent)
20	MF	JPN	Yuji Miyahara (Retired)
22	GK	JPN	Motohiro Yoshida (to FC Machida Zelvia)
24	DF	JPN	Yasuomi Kugisaki (to Honda Lock SC)

=== Consadole Sapporo ===
In: Note: Flags indicate national team as defined under FIFA eligibility rules; some limited exceptions apply. Players may hold more than one non-FIFA nationality.

No.	Pos.	Nation	Player
—	DF	JPN	Ryuji Fujiyama (from FC Tokyo)
—	FW	JPN	Yoshihiro Uchimura (from Ehime FC)
—	FW	JPN	Masashi Nakayama (from Júbilo Iwata)
—	FW	JPN	Yusuke Kondo (from FC Tokyo)

Out: Note: Flags indicate national team as defined under FIFA eligibility rules; some limited exceptions apply. Players may hold more than one non-FIFA nationality.

No.	Pos.	Nation	Player
4	DF	JPN	Yushi Soda (Retired)
16	GK	JPN	Hiroki Aratani (to Ventforet Kofu)
13	FW	JPN	Genki Nakayama (Released)
9	FW	JPN	Kengo Ishii (to Ehime FC)
3	DF	JPN	Shingo Shibata (Released)
22	MF	JPN	Daigo Nishi (on loan to Albirex Niigata)
—	GK	JPN	Takuto Hayashi (to Vegalta Sendai)

=== Ehime FC ===
In: Note: Flags indicate national team as defined under FIFA eligibility rules; some limited exceptions apply. Players may hold more than one non-FIFA nationality.

No.	Pos.	Nation	Player
—	FW	JPN	Kenji Fukuda (from Ionikos F.C.)
—	GK	JPN	Shinya Kato (On loan from Kashiwa Reysol)
—	MF	JPN	Shunta Nagai (On loan from Kashiwa Reysol)

Out: Note: Flags indicate national team as defined under FIFA eligibility rules; some limited exceptions apply. Players may hold more than one non-FIFA nationality.

No.	Pos.	Nation	Player
8	FW	JPN	Yoshihiro Uchimura (to Consadole Sapporo)
27	MF	JPN	Daisuke Aono (Retired)

=== Fagiano Okayama ===
In: Note: Flags indicate national team as defined under FIFA eligibility rules; some limited exceptions apply. Players may hold more than one non-FIFA nationality.

No.	Pos.	Nation	Player

Out: Note: Flags indicate national team as defined under FIFA eligibility rules; some limited exceptions apply. Players may hold more than one non-FIFA nationality.

No.	Pos.	Nation	Player
2	DF	JPN	Yuji Ozaki (Released, free agent)
3	DF	JPN	Mutsumi Tamabayashi (Released, free agent)
7	DF	JPN	Akira Marutani (Released, free agent)
8	MF	JPN	Kazunari Hosaka (Released, free agent)
9	FW	JPN	Yasutaka Kobayashi (Released, free agent)
13	DF	KOR	Kim Kwang-min (Released, free agent)
15	FW	JPN	Keisuke Sekiguchi (Released, free agent)
30	MF	JPN	Naota Yamaguchi (Released, free agent)
31	DF	JPN	Tsubasa Oshima (Released, free agent)
37	MF	JPN	Shunsuke Aoyama (Released, free agent)
38	DF	JPN	Naoki Mihara (Released, free agent)
39	FW	JPN	Daiki Iwata (Released, free agent)

=== FC Gifu ===
In: Note: Flags indicate national team as defined under FIFA eligibility rules; some limited exceptions apply. Players may hold more than one non-FIFA nationality.

No.	Pos.	Nation	Player
—	FW	JPN	Kazuto Sakamoto (from Kagoshima Jitsugyo High School)
—	DF	BRA	Flavio Augusto Pereira (from Shibuya Makuhari High School)
—	DF	JPN	Tomohiro Yamauchi (from Tokaigakuen University)
—	GK	JPN	Tatsuya Murao (from Miyazaki Sangyo-keiei University)

Out: Note: Flags indicate national team as defined under FIFA eligibility rules; some limited exceptions apply. Players may hold more than one non-FIFA nationality.

No.	Pos.	Nation	Player
3	DF	JPN	Kan Kikuchi (Transferred to Bontang FC)
8	MF	KOR	Seo Kwan-soo (Released, free agent)
13	MF	PHI	Satoshi Otomo (Transferred to Persib)
21	GK	JPN	Masatoshi Mizutani (Released, free agent)
24	FW	JPN	Masato Katayama (Released, free agent)

=== Mito HollyHock ===
In: Note: Flags indicate national team as defined under FIFA eligibility rules; some limited exceptions apply. Players may hold more than one non-FIFA nationality.

No.	Pos.	Nation	Player
—	GK	JPN	Hironobu Ono (from Chuo University)
—	FW	JPN	Satoshi Tokiwa (from Tokyo Agricultural University)

Out: Note: Flags indicate national team as defined under FIFA eligibility rules; some limited exceptions apply. Players may hold more than one non-FIFA nationality.

No.	Pos.	Nation	Player
4	DF	JPN	Kazuhiro Suzuki (Released, free agent)
6	MF	JPN	Kento Hori (Released, free agent)
7	MF	JPN	Jun Muramatsu (Released, free agent)
14	MF	KOR	Kim Tae-Yeon (loan return to Vissel Kobe)
17	MF	JPN	Hiromasa Kanazawa (Released, free agent)
20	FW	JPN	Kohei Yamamoto (loan return to Shonan Bellmare)
25	MF	JPN	Shunichi Nakajima (Released, free agent)
27	MF	JPN	Naoto Ishikawa (Released, free agent)
28	GK	JPN	Shinichi Shuto (Released, free agent)

=== JEF United Chiba ===
In: Note: Flags indicate national team as defined under FIFA eligibility rules; some limited exceptions apply. Players may hold more than one non-FIFA nationality.

No.	Pos.	Nation	Player
5	DF	AUS	Mark Milligan (From Shanghai Shenhua)

Out: Note: Flags indicate national team as defined under FIFA eligibility rules; some limited exceptions apply. Players may hold more than one non-FIFA nationality.

No.	Pos.	Nation	Player
4	DF	AUS	Eddy Bosnar (Released, free agent)
6	MF	JPN	Tomi Shimomura (Released, free agent)
11	FW	JPN	Tatsunori Arai (Released, free agent)
20	MF	JPN	Naoya Saeki (Released, free agent)
30	GK	JPN	Torashi Shimazu (Released, free agent)

=== Kataller Toyama ===
In: Note: Flags indicate national team as defined under FIFA eligibility rules; some limited exceptions apply. Players may hold more than one non-FIFA nationality.

No.	Pos.	Nation	Player
9	FW	JPN	Teruaki Kurobe (from Avispa Fukuoka)
16	DF	JPN	Yusuke Yada (from Sagan Tosu)
20	FW	JPN	Takuya Kokeguchi (from Cerezo Osaka)
21	GK	JPN	Keisuke Naito (from Kokushikan University)
22	DF	JPN	Kenjiro Ezoe (on loan from Cerezo Osaka)
23	FW	JPN	Kai Hirano (from Biwako Seikei Sport College)
24	DF	JPN	Naoto Yoshii (from Osaka Gakuin University)
28	FW	JPN	Ryoga Sekihara (from Yokohama F. Marinos youth team)
29	MF	JPN	Taijiro Mori (from Toyama Daiichi High School)

Out: Note: Flags indicate national team as defined under FIFA eligibility rules; some limited exceptions apply. Players may hold more than one non-FIFA nationality.

No.	Pos.	Nation	Player
16	MF	JPN	Kenji Kageyama (Retired)
20	MF	JPN	Daigo Imai (to Blaublitz Akita)
21	GK	JPN	Koji Fujikawa (Retired)
22	DF	JPN	Michiharu Otagiri (Retired)
24	MF	JPN	Hirotaku Hagiwara (Released, free agent)
28	DF	JPN	Kazuhito Esaki (to Blaublitz Akita)
29	MF	JPN	Shota Kanno (Retired)

=== Giravanz Kitakyushu ===
In: Note: Flags indicate national team as defined under FIFA eligibility rules; some limited exceptions apply. Players may hold more than one non-FIFA nationality.

No.	Pos.	Nation	Player
4	DF	JPN	Satoshi Nagano (from Avispa Fukuoka)
9	FW	JPN	Tomoki Ikemoto (on loan from Kashiwa Reysol)
13	DF	JPN	Kazuya Kawabata (from Roasso Kumamoto)
14	MF	JPN	Jun Muramatsu (from Mito Hollyhock)
15	MF	BRA	Wellington (from Avispa Fukuoka)
21	GK	JPN	Shogo Tokihisa (from Ventforet Kofu)
25	FW	JPN	Yasuaki Oshima (from Tokushima Vortis)

Out: Note: Flags indicate national team as defined under FIFA eligibility rules; some limited exceptions apply. Players may hold more than one non-FIFA nationality.

No.	Pos.	Nation	Player
4	DF	BRA	Douglas (Released, free agent)
9	FW	JPN	Shinji Fujiyoshi (Retired)
13	MF	JPN	Isao Kubota (Released, free agent)
14	MF	JPN	Korehito Morimoto (Released, free agent)
15	DF	JPN	Ryo Nagano (to FC Machida Zelvia)
18	MF	JPN	Shingi Ono (Retired)
19	FW	JPN	Kazuki Koga (Released, free agent)
21	GK	JPN	Keisuke Shimizu (loan return to Oita Trinita)
22	DF	JPN	Shun Ichimura (Released, free agent)
27	FW	BRA	Alan (Released, free agent)

=== Kashiwa Reysol ===
In: Note: Flags indicate national team as defined under FIFA eligibility rules; some limited exceptions apply. Players may hold more than one non-FIFA nationality.

No.	Pos.	Nation	Player
—	DF	KOR	Park Dong-Hyuk (from Gamba Osaka)

Out: Note: Flags indicate national team as defined under FIFA eligibility rules; some limited exceptions apply. Players may hold more than one non-FIFA nationality.

No.	Pos.	Nation	Player
2	DF	JPN	Jiro Kamata (Released, free agent)
11	MF	BRA	Popo (loan return to ADAP)
16	FW	BRA	Anselmo Ramon (loan return to Cruzeiro)
18	MF	JPN	Iwao Yamane (Released, free agent)
21	GK	JPN	Yuta Minami (Released, free agent)
24	MF	JPN	Jun Yanagisawa (Released, free agent)
—	GK	JPN	Shinya Kato (On loan to Ehime FC)
—	MF	JPN	Shunta Nagai (On loan to Ehime FC)

=== Roasso Kumamoto ===
In: Note: Flags indicate national team as defined under FIFA eligibility rules; some limited exceptions apply. Players may hold more than one non-FIFA nationality.

No.	Pos.	Nation	Player
—	GK	JPN	Masaki Kinoshita (from Gamba Osaka)

Out: Note: Flags indicate national team as defined under FIFA eligibility rules; some limited exceptions apply. Players may hold more than one non-FIFA nationality.

No.	Pos.	Nation	Player

=== Sagan Tosu ===
In: Note: Flags indicate national team as defined under FIFA eligibility rules; some limited exceptions apply. Players may hold more than one non-FIFA nationality.

No.	Pos.	Nation	Player

Out: Note: Flags indicate national team as defined under FIFA eligibility rules; some limited exceptions apply. Players may hold more than one non-FIFA nationality.

No.	Pos.	Nation	Player
—	MF	JPN	Yusuke Shimada (to Omiya Ardija)

=== Thespa Kusatsu ===
In: Note: Flags indicate national team as defined under FIFA eligibility rules; some limited exceptions apply. Players may hold more than one non-FIFA nationality.

No.	Pos.	Nation	Player
—	MF	JPN	Masafumi Maeda (from Gamba Osaka) (Note: 前田雅文選手 ガンバ大阪より完全移籍加入のお知らせ (in Japanese). thespa.co.jp. 2009-12-25.)

Out: Note: Flags indicate national team as defined under FIFA eligibility rules; some limited exceptions apply. Players may hold more than one non-FIFA nationality.

No.	Pos.	Nation	Player

=== Tochigi SC ===
In: Note: Flags indicate national team as defined under FIFA eligibility rules; some limited exceptions apply. Players may hold more than one non-FIFA nationality.

No.	Pos.	Nation	Player
—	DF	JPN	Masato Hashimoto (On loan from Urawa Red Diamonds)

Out: Note: Flags indicate national team as defined under FIFA eligibility rules; some limited exceptions apply. Players may hold more than one non-FIFA nationality.

No.	Pos.	Nation	Player
4	DF	JPN	Yuki Inoue (Released, free agent)
8	MF	JPN	Keisuke Kurihara (Released, free agent)
9	FW	JPN	Masatoshi Matsuda (Released, free agent)
10	MF	JPN	Ryosuke Takayasu (Released, free agent)
11	FW	JPN	Yasuki Ishidate (Released, free agent)
14	FW	JPN	Hisahito Inaba (Released, free agent)
16	DF	JPN	Masaya Saito (Released, free agent)
17	MF	JPN	Atsushi Ito (Released, free agent)
18	MF	JPN	Shinichi Mukai (Released, free agent)
22	DF	JPN	Masataka Tamura (Released, free agent)
24	DF	JPN	Norihiro Kawakami (Released, free agent)
25	DF	JPN	Yusei Kudo (Released, free agent)
27	MF	JPN	Daisuke Hoshi (Released, free agent)
29	GK	JPN	Kiyomitsu Kobari (Released, free agent)
33	MF	KOR	Lee Jong-min (Released, free agent)
36	FW	JPN	Manabu Wakabayashi (Released, free agent)

=== Oita Trinita ===
In: Note: Flags indicate national team as defined under FIFA eligibility rules; some limited exceptions apply. Players may hold more than one non-FIFA nationality.

No.	Pos.	Nation	Player

Out: Note: Flags indicate national team as defined under FIFA eligibility rules; some limited exceptions apply. Players may hold more than one non-FIFA nationality.

No.	Pos.	Nation	Player
6	DF	JPN	Masato Morishige (to FC Tokyo)
—	MF	JPN	Teppei Nishiyama (Released, free agent)
—	MF	JPN	Takashi Umeda (Released, free agent)
—	MF	JPN	Shingo Suzuki (Released, free agent)
—	DF	JPN	Yuichi Shibakoya (Released, free agent)

=== Ventforet Kofu ===
In: Note: Flags indicate national team as defined under FIFA eligibility rules; some limited exceptions apply. Players may hold more than one non-FIFA nationality.

No.	Pos.	Nation	Player

Out: Note: Flags indicate national team as defined under FIFA eligibility rules; some limited exceptions apply. Players may hold more than one non-FIFA nationality.

No.	Pos.	Nation	Player
—	DF	JPN	Naoki Wako (Released, free agent)
—	DF	JPN	Arata Sugiyama (Released, free agent)
—	GK	JPN	Kensaku Abe (Retired)
—	MF	JPN	Kentaro Hayashi (Retired)
—	MF	JPN	Atsushi Mio (Released, free agent)
—	FW	JPN	Masafumi Maeda (End of Loan)

=== Tokyo Verdy ===
In: Note: Flags indicate national team as defined under FIFA eligibility rules; some limited exceptions apply. Players may hold more than one non-FIFA nationality.

No.	Pos.	Nation	Player

Out: Note: Flags indicate national team as defined under FIFA eligibility rules; some limited exceptions apply. Players may hold more than one non-FIFA nationality.

No.	Pos.	Nation	Player
—	MF	JPN	Yuta Baba (Released, free agent)

=== Tokushima Vortis ===
In: Note: Flags indicate national team as defined under FIFA eligibility rules; some limited exceptions apply. Players may hold more than one non-FIFA nationality.

No.	Pos.	Nation	Player

Out: Note: Flags indicate national team as defined under FIFA eligibility rules; some limited exceptions apply. Players may hold more than one non-FIFA nationality.

No.	Pos.	Nation	Player

=== Yokohama FC ===
In: Note: Flags indicate national team as defined under FIFA eligibility rules; some limited exceptions apply. Players may hold more than one non-FIFA nationality.

No.	Pos.	Nation	Player

Out: Note: Flags indicate national team as defined under FIFA eligibility rules; some limited exceptions apply. Players may hold more than one non-FIFA nationality.

No.	Pos.	Nation	Player
—	GK	JPN	Kenji Koyama (Released, free agent)
—	DF	JPN	Kosuke Yatsuda (Released, free agent)
—	DF	JPN	Takafumi Yoshimoto (Released, free agent)
—	MF	JPN	Daishi Kato (Released, free agent)
—	FW	JPN	Sho Gokyu (Released, free agent)
—	MF	JPN	Yusuke Sudo (Released, free agent)
—	DF	JPN	Toshiki Suzuki (Released, free agent)
—	MF	KOR	Chung Yong-Dae (Released, free agent)
—	GK	JPN	Tatsumi Iida (Released, free agent)

== See also ==
- J.League
