= 2009 Mito HollyHock season =

Mito HollyHock
2009 season
- Manager: Takashi Kiyama
- Stadium: Kasamatsu Stadium
- J. League 2: 8th
- Emperor's Cup: 2nd Round
- Top goalscorer: Hiroyuki Takasaki (19)
Home colours	Away colours

2009 Mito HollyHock season

== Competitions ==
Competitions	Position
J. League 2	8th / 18 clubs
Emperor's Cup	2nd Round

== Player statistics ==
No.	Pos.	Player	D.o.B. (Age)	Height / Weight	J. League 2		Emperor's Cup		Total	
No.	Pos.	Player	D.o.B. (Age)	Height / Weight	Apps	Goals	Apps	Goals	Apps	Goals
1	GK	Koji Homma	April 27, 1977 (aged 31)	cm / kg	50	0				
2	DF	Yuki Ozawa	October 4, 1983 (aged 25)	cm / kg	48	1				
3	DF	Sunao Hozaki	March 14, 1987 (aged 21)	cm / kg	39	2				
4	DF	Kazuhiro Suzuki	November 16, 1976 (aged 32)	cm / kg	36	0				
5	DF	Hiroki Kato	July 31, 1986 (aged 22)	cm / kg	4	0				
6	MF	Kento Hori	June 13, 1982 (aged 26)	cm / kg	14	1				
7	MF	Jun Muramatsu	April 10, 1982 (aged 26)	cm / kg	36	0				
8	MF	Takuro Kikuoka	June 30, 1985 (aged 23)	cm / kg	40	4				
9	FW	Tomoyuki Arata	October 3, 1985 (aged 23)	cm / kg	34	14				
10	FW	Mitsuru Mansho	April 16, 1989 (aged 19)	cm / kg	0	0				
11	FW	Hiroyuki Takasaki	March 17, 1986 (aged 22)	cm / kg	46	19				
13	FW	Kota Yoshihara	February 2, 1978 (aged 31)	cm / kg	47	9				
14	MF	Kim Tae-Yeon	June 27, 1988 (aged 20)	cm / kg	47	2				
15	MF	Yuki Shimada	November 18, 1986 (aged 22)	cm / kg	13	0				
16	MF	Kohei Shimoda	April 8, 1989 (aged 19)	cm / kg	17	0				
17	DF	Hiromasa Kanazawa	December 1, 1983 (aged 25)	cm / kg	25	0				
18	MF	Taiki Tsuruno	September 4, 1990 (aged 18)	cm / kg	2	0				
19	MF	Kota Morimura	August 14, 1988 (aged 20)	cm / kg	46	5				
20	FW	Kohei Yamamoto	April 15, 1986 (aged 22)	cm / kg	13	0				
21	DF	Keisuke Hoshino	August 21, 1985 (aged 23)	cm / kg	11	0				
22	MF	Kenichi Mori	October 23, 1984 (aged 24)	cm / kg	22	0				
23	FW	Keisuke Endo	March 20, 1989 (aged 19)	cm / kg	46	7				
25	MF	Shunichi Nakajima	June 16, 1982 (aged 26)	cm / kg	1	0				
27	MF	Naoto Ishikawa	November 7, 1989 (aged 19)	cm / kg	1	0				
28	GK	Shinichi Shuto	June 8, 1983 (aged 25)	cm / kg	0	0				
30	DF	Hideyuki Nakamura	June 3, 1984 (aged 24)	cm / kg	27	3				
31	GK	Yoshinobu Harada	May 17, 1986 (aged 22)	cm / kg	1	0				
32	DF	Masashi Owada	July 28, 1981 (aged 27)	cm / kg	44	2				
33	GK	Kohei Doi	December 24, 1988 (aged 20)	cm / kg	0	0				

== Other pages ==
- (in Japanese) J. League official site
