= 2006 Yokohama FC season =

Yokohama FC
2006 season
- Manager: Yusuke Adachi; Takuya Takagi
- Stadium: Yokohama Mitsuzawa Stadium
- J.League 2: 1st
- Emperor's Cup: 3rd Round
- Top goalscorer: Alemão (18)

2006 Yokohama FC season

== Competitions ==
Competitions	Position
J.League 2	1st / 13 clubs
Emperor's Cup	3rd round

== Domestic results ==
=== J.League 2 ===
Match	Date	Venue	Opponents	Score
1	2006..			-
2	2006..			-
3	2006..			-
4	2006..			-
5	2006..			-
6	2006..			-
7	2006..			-
8	2006..			-
9	2006..			-
10	2006..			-
11	2006..			-
12	2006..			-
13	2006..			-
14	2006..			-
15	2006..			-
16	2006..			-
17	2006..			-
18	2006..			-
19	2006..			-
20	2006..			-
21	2006..			-
22	2006..			-
23	2006..			-
24	2006..			-
25	2006..			-
26	2006..			-
27	2006..			-
28	2006..			-
29	2006..			-
30	2006..			-
31	2006..			-
32	2006..			-
33	2006..			-
34	2006..			-
35	2006..			-
36	2006..			-
37	2006..			-
38	2006..			-
39	2006..			-
40	2006..			-
41	2006..			-
42	2006..			-
43	2006..			-
44	2006..			-
45	2006..			-
46	2006..			-
47	2006..			-
48	2006..			-

=== Emperor's Cup ===
Match	Date	Venue	Opponents	Score
3rd round	2006..			-

== Player statistics ==
No.	Pos.	Player	D.o.B. (Age)	Height / Weight	J.League 2		Emperor's Cup		Total	
No.	Pos.	Player	D.o.B. (Age)	Height / Weight	Apps	Goals	Apps	Goals	Apps	Goals
1	GK	Kenji Koyama	September 5, 1972 (aged 33)	cm / kg	0	0				
2	DF	Tomonobu Hayakawa	July 11, 1977 (aged 28)	cm / kg	39	3				
3	MF	Mitsuteru Watanabe	April 10, 1974 (aged 31)	cm / kg	0	0				
4	DF	Steven Tweed	August 8, 1972 (aged 33)	cm / kg	13	2				
4	DF	Choi Sung-Yong	December 25, 1975 (aged 30)	cm / kg	22	0				
5	DF	Ichiei Muroi	June 22, 1974 (aged 31)	cm / kg	8	0				
6	MF	Motohiro Yamaguchi	January 29, 1969 (aged 37)	cm / kg	46	0				
7	FW	Izaias	June 5, 1975 (aged 30)	cm / kg	2	0				
7	FW	Alemão	April 10, 1984 (aged 21)	cm / kg	24	18				
8	MF	Augusto	November 20, 1983 (aged 22)	cm / kg	34	6				
9	FW	Shoji Jo	June 17, 1975 (aged 30)	cm / kg	43	12				
10	MF	Tomoya Uchida	July 10, 1983 (aged 22)	cm / kg	46	3				
11	FW	Kazuyoshi Miura	February 26, 1967 (aged 39)	cm / kg	39	6				
12	GK	Koichi Hirono	April 16, 1980 (aged 25)	cm / kg	0	0				
13	MF	Chong Yong-De	February 4, 1978 (aged 28)	cm / kg	44	2				
14	MF	Tomoyuki Yoshino	July 9, 1980 (aged 25)	cm / kg	25	0				
15	MF	Yohei Sakai	April 10, 1986 (aged 19)	cm / kg	11	0				
16	MF	Tsuyoshi Yoshitake	September 8, 1981 (aged 24)	cm / kg	26	2				
17	FW	Tomotaka Kitamura	May 27, 1982 (aged 23)	cm / kg	32	2				
18	MF	Tomoyoshi Ono	August 12, 1979 (aged 26)	cm / kg	44	0				
19	DF	Hiroyuki Kobayashi	April 18, 1980 (aged 25)	cm / kg	16	0				
20	DF	Hideaki Tominaga	August 27, 1976 (aged 29)	cm / kg	15	0				
21	GK	Takanori Sugeno	May 3, 1984 (aged 21)	cm / kg	48	0				
22	MF	Shigeyoshi Mochizuki	July 9, 1973 (aged 32)	cm / kg	0	0				
23	DF	Kazuya Iwakura	April 26, 1985 (aged 20)	cm / kg	7	0				
24	DF	Yoichi Akiba	November 23, 1983 (aged 22)	cm / kg	4	0				
25	DF	Hiromasa Kanazawa	December 1, 1983 (aged 22)	cm / kg	1	0				
26	DF	Kosuke Ota	July 23, 1987 (aged 18)	cm / kg	1	0				
27	DF	Takanori Nakajima	February 9, 1984 (aged 22)	cm / kg	28	0				
28	MF	Satoshi Yoshioka	July 6, 1987 (aged 18)	cm / kg	0	0				
29	MF	Kunihiko Takizawa	April 20, 1978 (aged 27)	cm / kg	21	2				
30	DF	Norio Omura	September 6, 1969 (aged 36)	cm / kg	15	1				
31	FW	Hiroaki Namba	December 9, 1982 (aged 23)	cm / kg	1	1				

== Other pages ==
- (in Japanese) J. League official site
