= 2007 Yokohama FC season =

Yokohama FC
2007 season
- Manager: Takuya Takagi; Júlio Leal
- Stadium: Yokohama Mitsuzawa Stadium
- J.League 1: 18th
- Emperor's Cup: 5th Round
- J.League Cup: GL-C 2nd
- Top goalscorer: Kazuyoshi Miura (3); Hiroaki Namba (3); Shingo Nejime (3); Kazuki Hiramoto (3)

2007 Yokohama FC season

== Competitions ==
| Competitions | Position |
|---|---|
| J.League 1 | 18th / 18 clubs |
| Emperor's Cup | 5th round |
| J.League Cup | GL-C 2nd / 4 clubs |

== Domestic results ==
=== J.League 1 ===
| Match | Date | Venue | Opponents | Score |
|---|---|---|---|---|
| 1 | 2007.. | | | - |
| 2 | 2007.. | | | - |
| 3 | 2007.. | | | - |
| 4 | 2007.. | | | - |
| 5 | 2007.. | | | - |
| 6 | 2007.. | | | - |
| 7 | 2007.. | | | - |
| 8 | 2007.. | | | - |
| 9 | 2007.. | | | - |
| 10 | 2007.. | | | - |
| 11 | 2007.. | | | - |
| 12 | 2007.. | | | - |
| 13 | 2007.. | | | - |
| 14 | 2007.. | | | - |
| 15 | 2007.. | | | - |
| 16 | 2007.. | | | - |
| 17 | 2007.. | | | - |
| 18 | 2007.. | | | - |
| 19 | 2007.. | | | - |
| 20 | 2007.. | | | - |
| 21 | 2007.. | | | - |
| 22 | 2007.. | | | - |
| 23 | 2007.. | | | - |
| 24 | 2007.. | | | - |
| 25 | 2007.. | | | - |
| 26 | 2007.. | | | - |
| 27 | 2007.. | | | - |
| 28 | 2007.. | | | - |
| 29 | 2007.. | | | - |
| 30 | 2007.. | | | - |
| 31 | 2007.. | | | - |
| 32 | 2007.. | | | - |
| 33 | 2007.. | | | - |
| 34 | 2007.. | | | - |

=== Emperor's Cup ===
| Match | Date | Venue | Opponents | Score |
|---|---|---|---|---|
| 4th round | 2007.. | | | - |
| 5th round | 2007.. | | | - |

=== J.League Cup ===
| Match | Date | Venue | Opponents | Score |
|---|---|---|---|---|
| GL-C-1 | 2007.. | | | - |
| GL-C-2 | 2007.. | | | - |
| GL-C-3 | 2007.. | | | - |
| GL-C-4 | 2007.. | | | - |
| GL-C-5 | 2007.. | | | - |
| GL-C-6 | 2007.. | | | - |

== Player statistics ==
| No. | Pos. | Player | D.o.B. (Age) | Height / Weight | J.League 1 | | Emperor's Cup | | J.League Cup | | Total | |
| No. | Pos. | Player | D.o.B. (Age) | Height / Weight | Apps | Goals | Apps | Goals | Apps | Goals | Apps | Goals |
|---|---|---|---|---|---|---|---|---|---|---|---|---|
| 1 | GK | Kenji Koyama | September 5, 1972 (aged 34) | cm / kg | 0 | 0 | | | | | | |
| 2 | DF | Tomonobu Hayakawa | July 11, 1977 (aged 29) | cm / kg | 23 | 1 | | | | | | |
| 3 | DF | Anderson | December 14, 1981 (aged 25) | cm / kg | 0 | 0 | | | | | | |
| 3 | MF | Oh Beom-Seok | July 29, 1984 (aged 22) | cm / kg | 10 | 0 | | | | | | |
| 4 | DF | Takumi Wada | October 20, 1981 (aged 25) | cm / kg | 23 | 1 | | | | | | |
| 5 | DF | Ichiei Muroi | June 22, 1974 (aged 32) | cm / kg | 9 | 0 | | | | | | |
| 6 | MF | Motohiro Yamaguchi | January 29, 1969 (aged 38) | cm / kg | 20 | 0 | | | | | | |
| 7 | MF | Tomoyuki Yoshino | July 9, 1980 (aged 26) | cm / kg | 10 | 0 | | | | | | |
| 8 | MF | Adriano Pimenta | November 14, 1982 (aged 24) | cm / kg | 3 | 0 | | | | | | |
| 8 | MF | Marcos Paulo | May 11, 1977 (aged 29) | cm / kg | 11 | 0 | | | | | | |
| 9 | FW | Tatsuhiko Kubo | June 18, 1976 (aged 30) | cm / kg | 8 | 1 | | | | | | |
| 10 | MF | Tomoya Uchida | July 10, 1983 (aged 23) | cm / kg | 23 | 1 | | | | | | |
| 11 | FW | Kazuyoshi Miura | February 26, 1967 (aged 40) | cm / kg | 24 | 3 | | | | | | |
| 12 | MF | Kunihiko Takizawa | April 20, 1978 (aged 28) | cm / kg | 31 | 0 | | | | | | |
| 13 | MF | Chong Yong-De | February 4, 1978 (aged 29) | cm / kg | 12 | 0 | | | | | | |
| 14 | MF | Daisuke Oku | February 7, 1976 (aged 31) | cm / kg | 16 | 1 | | | | | | |
| 15 | MF | Yohei Sakai | April 10, 1986 (aged 20) | cm / kg | 2 | 0 | | | | | | |
| 16 | FW | Mitsunori Yabuta | May 2, 1976 (aged 30) | cm / kg | 11 | 0 | | | | | | |
| 17 | FW | Gilmar Silva | March 9, 1984 (aged 22) | cm / kg | 5 | 0 | | | | | | |
| 18 | MF | Tomoyoshi Ono | August 12, 1979 (aged 27) | cm / kg | 15 | 0 | | | | | | |
| 19 | FW | Hiroaki Namba | December 9, 1982 (aged 24) | cm / kg | 18 | 3 | | | | | | |
| 20 | MF | Jun Tamano | June 19, 1984 (aged 22) | cm / kg | 6 | 0 | | | | | | |
| 21 | GK | Takanori Sugeno | May 3, 1984 (aged 22) | cm / kg | 34 | 0 | | | | | | |
| 22 | DF | Yoichi Akiba | November 23, 1983 (aged 23) | cm / kg | 2 | 0 | | | | | | |
| 23 | DF | Kazuya Iwakura | April 26, 1985 (aged 21) | cm / kg | 5 | 0 | | | | | | |
| 24 | MF | Shingo Nejime | December 22, 1984 (aged 22) | cm / kg | 23 | 3 | | | | | | |
| 25 | FW | Kazuki Hiramoto | August 18, 1981 (aged 25) | cm / kg | 14 | 3 | | | | | | |
| 26 | DF | Kosuke Ota | July 23, 1987 (aged 19) | cm / kg | 17 | 0 | | | | | | |
| 27 | DF | Takanori Nakajima | February 9, 1984 (aged 23) | cm / kg | 20 | 0 | | | | | | |
| 28 | DF | Bae Seung-Jin | November 3, 1987 (aged 19) | cm / kg | 0 | 0 | | | | | | |
| 29 | FW | Cho Young-Cheol | May 31, 1989 (aged 17) | cm / kg | 9 | 0 | | | | | | |
| 30 | DF | Norio Omura | September 6, 1969 (aged 37) | cm / kg | 18 | 0 | | | | | | |
| 31 | GK | Fumiya Iwamaru | December 4, 1981 (aged 25) | cm / kg | 0 | 0 | | | | | | |
| 32 | DF | Takuya Yamada | August 24, 1974 (aged 32) | cm / kg | 19 | 1 | | | | | | |
| 34 | MF | Takahisa Nishiyama | July 11, 1985 (aged 21) | cm / kg | 10 | 0 | | | | | | |
| 35 | FW | Katatau | March 31, 1986 (aged 20) | cm / kg | 9 | 0 | | | | | | |
| 39 | MF | Atsuhiro Miura | July 24, 1974 (aged 32) | cm / kg | 9 | 0 | | | | | | |

== Other pages ==
- (in Japanese) J. League official site
