= 2009 Yokohama FC season =

Yokohama FC
2009 season
- Manager: Yasuhiro Higuchi
- Stadium: Nippatsu Mitsuzawa Stadium
- J.League 2: 16th
- Emperor's Cup: 3rd Round
- Top goalscorer: Hiroaki Namba (8)

2009 Yokohama FC season

== Competitions ==
Competitions	Position
J.League 2	16th / 18 clubs
Emperor's Cup	3rd round

== Player statistics ==
No.	Pos.	Player	D.o.B. (Age)	Height / Weight	J.League 2		Emperor's Cup		Total	
No.	Pos.	Player	D.o.B. (Age)	Height / Weight	Apps	Goals	Apps	Goals	Apps	Goals
1	GK	Kenji Koyama	September 5, 1972 (aged 36)	cm / kg	1	0				
2	DF	Tomonobu Hayakawa	July 11, 1977 (aged 31)	cm / kg	42	3				
3	DF	Kosuke Yatsuda	March 17, 1982 (aged 26)	cm / kg	26	2				
4	DF	Kenta Togawa	June 23, 1981 (aged 27)	cm / kg	28	2				
5	MF	Tsuyoshi Hakkaku	April 20, 1985 (aged 23)	cm / kg	40	3				
6	DF	Masaki Yoshida	April 10, 1984 (aged 24)	cm / kg	42	0				
7	DF	Takafumi Yoshimoto	May 13, 1978 (aged 30)	cm / kg	23	0				
8	MF	Tomoyoshi Ono	August 12, 1979 (aged 29)	cm / kg	22	2				
9	FW	Tomoki Ikemoto	March 27, 1985 (aged 23)	cm / kg	40	4				
10	MF	Yu Hyo-Jin	April 5, 1981 (aged 27)	cm / kg	1	0				
10	FW	An Hyo-Yeon	April 16, 1978 (aged 30)	cm / kg	18	3				
11	FW	Kazuyoshi Miura	February 26, 1967 (aged 42)	cm / kg	30	1				
13	DF	Shosuke Katayama	September 8, 1983 (aged 25)	cm / kg	46	0				
14	DF	Terukazu Tanaka	July 14, 1985 (aged 23)	cm / kg	41	0				
15	MF	Daishi Kato	July 26, 1983 (aged 25)	cm / kg	13	0				
16	GK	Fumiya Iwamaru	December 4, 1981 (aged 27)	cm / kg	17	0				
17	MF	Atsuhiro Miura	July 24, 1974 (aged 34)	cm / kg	24	3				
18	FW	Go Nishida	September 14, 1986 (aged 22)	cm / kg	44	4				
19	FW	Hiroaki Namba	December 9, 1982 (aged 26)	cm / kg	42	8				
20	FW	Sho Gokyu	June 11, 1983 (aged 25)	cm / kg	8	1				
21	GK	Takuo Ōkubo	September 18, 1989 (aged 19)	cm / kg	33	0				
22	DF	Kentaro Nakata	May 13, 1989 (aged 19)	cm / kg	2	0				
23	FW	Yuta Nakano	August 30, 1989 (aged 19)	cm / kg	9	1				
24	MF	Shingo Nejime	December 22, 1984 (aged 24)	cm / kg	22	1				
25	MF	Yusuke Sudo	May 7, 1986 (aged 22)	cm / kg	29	0				
26	DF	Ryuji Ito	July 23, 1990 (aged 18)	cm / kg	0	0				
27	MF	Ken Hisatomi	September 29, 1990 (aged 18)	cm / kg	6	0				
28	DF	Toshiki Suzuki	October 22, 1986 (aged 22)	cm / kg	0	0				
29	MF	Chong Yong-De	February 4, 1978 (aged 31)	cm / kg	39	1				
30	FW	Eder	August 21, 1989 (aged 19)	cm / kg	10	2				
31	GK	Tatsumi Iida	July 22, 1985 (aged 23)	cm / kg	0	0				

== Other pages ==
- (in Japanese) J. League official site
