= Hisahito =

- Gender: Male

Origin
- Origin: Japanese
- Meaning: Different meanings depending on the kanji used

Hisahito is a masculine Japanese given name. People named Hisahito include the following:

- Prince Hisahito (久仁), the later Emperor Go-Fukakusa
- Prince Hisahito of Akishino (悠仁親王, Hisahito shinnō) (born 2006), grandson of Emperor Akihito
- Hisahito Inaba (稲葉久人), J. League Division 1 football player
