= Kazuhito =

- Gender: Male

Origin
- Origin: Japanese
- Meaning: Different meanings depending on the kanji used

Kazuhito (written: 一仁, 和仁, 和人 or 数人) is a masculine Japanese given name. Notable people with the name include:

- Kazuhito Esaki (江崎 一仁; born 1986), Japanese footballer
- Kazuhito Kikuchi (菊池 一仁; born 1977), Japanese composer
- Kazuhito Kosaka (古坂 和仁; born 1973), Japanese comedian
- Kazuhito Mochizuki (望月 一仁; born 1957), Japanese footballer and manager
- Kazuhito Tadano (多田野 数人; born 1980), Japanese baseball player
- Kazuhito Tanaka (田中 和仁; born 1985), Japanese gymnast
- Kazuhito Watanabe (渡邊 一仁; born 1986), Japanese footballer
- Kazuhito Yamashita (山下 和仁; 1961–2026), Japanese classical guitarist

== Fictional characters ==
- Kazuhito Narita (成田 一仁), a character from the manga and anime Haikyu!! with the position of middle blocker from Karasuno High
