= Yūsei =

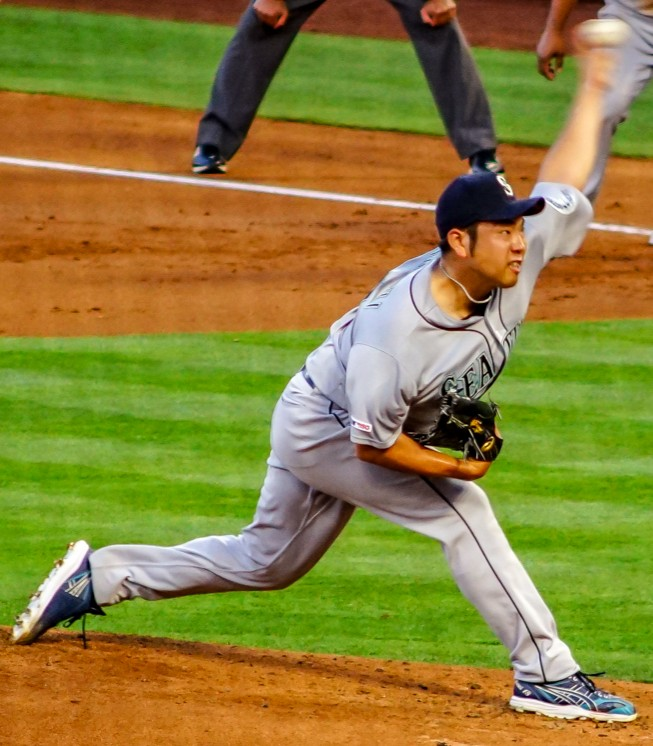
- Yusei Kikuchi, Japanese baseball player
- Pronunciation: jɯɯsei (IPA)
- Gender: Male

Origin
- Origin: Japanese
- Meaning: Different meanings depending on the kanji used

Other names
- Alternative spelling: Yusei (Kunrei-shiki) Yusei (Nihon-shiki) Yūsei, Yusei, Yuusei (Hepburn)

Yūsei, Yusei or Yuusei is a masculine Japanese given name.

== Written forms ==
Yūsei can be written using different combinations of kanji characters. Some examples:

- 勇星, "courage, star"
- 勇成, "courage, turn into"
- 勇盛, "courage, prosper"
- 勇誠, "courage, true"
- 勇正, "courage, righteous"
- 勇政, "courage, politics"
- 勇生, "courage, life"
- 勇精, "courage, vitality"
- 勇清, "courage, pure"
- 雄星, "masculine, star"
- 雄成, "masculine, turn into"
- 雄盛, "masculine, prosper"
- 雄誠, "masculine, true"
- 雄正, "masculine, righteous"
- 雄政, "masculine, politics"
- 雄生, "masculine, life"
- 雄精, "masculine, vitality"
- 雄清, "masculine, pure"
- 優星, "superiority, star"
- 優成, "superiority, turn into"
- 優生, "superiority, life"
- 優正, "superiority, righteous"
- 祐星, "to help, star"
- 祐誠, "to help, true"
- 友星, "friend, star"
- 友正, "friend, righteous"
- 有星, "to have, star"
- 有誠, "to have, true"
- 悠星, "long time, star"
- 悠正, "long time, righteous"

The name can also be written in hiragana ゆうせい or katakana ユウセイ.

== Notable people with the name ==
- Yusei Kikuchi (菊池 雄星; born 1991), Japanese baseball player
- Yusei Kudo (工藤 祐生; born 1986), Japanese footballer
- Yusei Matsui (松井 優征; born 1981), Japanese manga artist
- Yusei Nakahara (中原 優生; born 1993), Japanese footballer
- Yūsei Oda (織田 優成; born 1969), Japanese voice actor
- Yusei Ogasawara (小笠原 侑生; born 1988), Japanese footballer
- Yusei Ogawa (小川 雄勢; born 1996), Japanese judoka
- Yusei Sugiura (杉浦 佑成; born 1995), Japanese basketball player

== Fictional characters ==
- Yusei Fudo (不動 遊星), protagonist of the anime series Yu-Gi-Oh! 5D's
