= Takanori Nakajima =

Japanese footballer

Takanori Nakajima 中島 崇典
Personal information
- Full name: Takanori Nakajima
- Date of birth: February 9, 1984 (age 42)
- Place of birth: Chiba, Japan
- Height: 1.77 m (5 ft 10 in)
- Position: Defender

Youth career
- 1999–2001: Yachiyo High School

Senior career*
Years	Team	Apps	(Gls)
2002–2003	Shonan Bellmare	11	(0)
2004–2007	Yokohama FC	116	(1)
2008–2010	Avispa Fukuoka	90	(1)
2011–2012	Kashiwa Reysol	3	(0)
2012–2015	Yokohama FC	75	(0)
2016	Gainare Tottori	22	(0)
Total		317	(2)
Medal record
Kashiwa Reysol
Winner	J1 League	2011
Winner	Emperor's Cup	2012
- * Club domestic league appearances and goals

Takanori Nakajima (中島 崇典, Nakajima Takanori; born February 9, 1984) is a former Japanese football player.

== Playing career ==
Nakajima was born in Chiba Prefecture on February 9, 1984. After graduating from high school, he joined J2 League club Shonan Bellmare in 2002. He played many matches as left side back. Although he could hardly play in the match from summer 2002. In 2004, he moved to J2 club Yokohama FC. He became a regular left side back. Although the club results were sluggish every season, Yokohama won the champions in 2006 season and was promoted to J1 League first time in the club history. Although he played many matches, Yokohama finished at the bottom place in 2007 season and was relegated to J2 in a year. In 2008, he moved to J2 club Avispa Fukuoka. He played many matches in 3 seasons and Avispa was promoted to J1 end of 2010 season. In 2011, he moved to J1 club Kashiwa Reysol. However he could hardly play in the match. In August 2012, he moved to Yokohama FC for the first time in 5 years. He played many matches as left side back until 2015. In 2016, he moved to J3 League club Gainare Tottori. He retired end of 2016 season.

== Club statistics ==
Club performance			League		Cup		League Cup		Total	
Season	Club	League	Apps	Goals	Apps	Goals	Apps	Goals	Apps	Goals
Japan			League		Emperor's Cup		J.League Cup		Total	
2002	Shonan Bellmare	J2 League	11	0	0	0	-		11	0
2003	Shonan Bellmare	J2 League	0	0	0	0	-		0	0
Total			11	0	0	0	-		11	0
2004	Yokohama FC	J2 League	36	0	3	0	-		39	0
2005	Yokohama FC	J2 League	32	1	2	0	-		34	1
2006	Yokohama FC	J2 League	28	0	0	0	-		28	0
2007	Yokohama FC	J1 League	20	0	2	0	4	0	26	0
Total			116	1	7	0	4	0	127	1
2008	Avispa Fukuoka	J2 League	29	1	1	0	-		30	1
2009	Avispa Fukuoka	J2 League	31	0	2	0	-		33	0
2010	Avispa Fukuoka	J2 League	30	0	3	0	-		33	0
Total			90	1	6	0	-		96	1
2011	Kashiwa Reysol	J1 League	3	0	0	0	1	0	4	0
2012	Kashiwa Reysol	J1 League	0	0	0	0	0	0	0	0
Total			3	0	0	0	1	0	4	0
2012	Yokohama FC	J2 League	3	0	0	0	–		3	0
2013	Yokohama FC	J2 League	19	0	1	0	–		20	0
2014	Yokohama FC	J2 League	27	0	1	0	–		28	0
2015	Yokohama FC	J2 League	26	0	1	0	–		27	0
Total			75	0	3	0	–		78	0
2016	Gainare Tottori	J3 League	22	0	2	0	–		24	0
Total			22	0	2	0	–		24	0
Career total			317	2	18	0	5	0	340	2

== Honors ==
=== Kashiwa Reysol ===
- J1 League (1): 2011
- Japanese Super Cup (1): 2012

=== Yokohama FC ===
- J2 League (1): 2006
