= Tomoyoshi Ono =

Japanese footballer

Tomoyoshi Ono 小野 智吉
Personal information
- Full name: Tomoyoshi Ono
- Date of birth: August 12, 1979 (age 47)
- Place of birth: Yokohama, Japan
- Height: 1.71 m (5 ft 7 1/2 in)
- Position: Midfielder

Youth career
- 1995–1997: Toin Gakuen High School

Senior career*
Years	Team	Apps	(Gls)
1998–2000	Shonan Bellmare	17	(0)
2002–2010	Yokohama FC	218	(4)
Total		235	(4)
- * Club domestic league appearances and goals

Tomoyoshi Ono (小野 智吉, Ono Tomoyoshi; born August 12, 1979) is a former Japanese football player. he is the current assistant manager J1 League club of Yokohama FC.

== Playing career ==
Ono was born in Yokohama on August 12, 1979. After graduating from high school, he joined J1 League club Bellmare Hiratsuka (later Shonan Bellmare) in 1998. He debuted in 1998 and he played many matches as midfielder in 1999. However the club was relegated to J2 League from 2000. He could not play at all in the match in 2000 and left the club end of 2000 season. After 1 year blank, he joined his local club Yokohama FC. He also played as side back not only midfielder. The club won the champions in 2006 J2 League and was promoted to J1 from 2007. However his opportunity to play decreased and the club was relegated to J2 in a year. He retired end of 2010 season.

== Career statistics ==
Appearances and goals by club, season and competition
Club	Season	League			Emperor's Cup		J.League Cup		Total	
Club	Season	Division	Apps	Goals	Apps	Goals	Apps	Goals	Apps	Goals
Bellmare Hiratsuka	1998	J1 League	2	0	0	0	1	0	3	0
Bellmare Hiratsuka	1999	J1 League	15	0	0	0	2	0	17	0
Shonan Bellmare	2000	J2 League	0	0	0	0	0	0	0	0
Yokohama FC	2002	J2 League	14	0	1	0	—		15	0
Yokohama FC	2003	J2 League	41	0	3	0	—		44	0
Yokohama FC	2004	J2 League	16	1	2	0	—		18	1
Yokohama FC	2005	J2 League	37	1	2	0	—		39	1
Yokohama FC	2006	J2 League	44	0	0	0	—		44	0
Yokohama FC	2007	J1 League	15	0	0	0	4	0	19	0
Yokohama FC	2008	J2 League	18	0	0	0	—		18	0
Yokohama FC	2009	J2 League	22	2	0	0	—		22	2
Yokohama FC	2010	J2 League	11	0	2	0	—		13	0
Career total			235	4	10	0	7	0	252	4
