= Fumiya Iwamaru =

Japanese footballer (born 1981)

Fumiya Iwamaru 岩丸 史也
Personal information
- Full name: Fumiya Iwamaru
- Date of birth: December 4, 1981 (age 44)
- Place of birth: Fujioka, Gunma, Japan
- Height: 1.85 m (6 ft 1 in)
- Position: Goalkeeper

Youth career
- 1997–1999: Maebashi Ikuei High School

Senior career*
| Years | Team | Apps | (Gls) |
| 2000–2004 | Vissel Kobe | 7 | (0) |
| 2004 | Júbilo Iwata | 7 | (0) |
| 2005 | Thespa Kusatsu | 21 | (0) |
| 2006 | Avispa Fukuoka | 0 | (0) |
| 2007–2010 | Yokohama FC | 21 | (0) |
| 2011–2012 | Roasso Kumamoto | 4 | (0) |
| 2013 | V-Varen Nagasaki | 3 | (0) |
| 2014 | Thespakusatsu Gunma | 0 | (0) |
| Total | | 63 | (0) |
Medal record
Júbilo Iwata
| Runner-up | Emperor's Cup | 2004 |
Representing Japan
AFC U-19 Championship
| Silver medal – second place | 2000 Iran |
- * Club domestic league appearances and goals

Fumiya Iwamaru (岩丸 史也, Iwamaru Fumiya; born December 4, 1981) is a former Japanese football player.

== Playing career ==
Iwamaru was born in Fujioka on December 4, 1981. After graduating from high school, he joined the J1 League club Vissel Kobe in 2000. However he did not play as much as Makoto Kakegawa until 2003. In 2004, he played more often, after Kakegawa got hurt. In September 2004, he moved to Júbilo Iwata. In late 2004, he played often, after regular goalkeeper Yohei Sato got hurt. In 2005, he moved to the newly promoted J2 League club, Thespa Kusatsu (later Thespakusatsu Gunma), based in his home region. He competed with Nobuyuki Kojima for the position and played often.

In 2006, he moved to the newly promoted J1 club, Avispa Fukuoka. However he did not play as much as Yuichi Mizutani. In 2007, he moved to the newly promoted J1 club, Yokohama FC. However he did not play as much as Takanori Sugeno and the club was relegated to J2 within a year. Although he did not play as much as Kenji Koyama in 2008, he played often in 2009. He did not play at all in 2010.

In 2011, he moved to the J2 club Roasso Kumamoto. He did not play as much as Yuta Minami. In 2013, he moved to the newly promoted J2 club, V-Varen Nagasaki. Although he played in the first three matches, he did play at all after the fourth match, when Junki Kanayama played in his place. In 2014, he moved to the J2 club Thespakusatsu Gunma based in his local region. However he did not play at all, and retired at the end of the 2014 season.

== Career statistics ==
Appearances and goals by club, season and competition
| Club | Season | League | | | Emperor's Cup | | J.League Cup | | Total | |
| Club | Season | Division | Apps | Goals | Apps | Goals | Apps | Goals | Apps | Goals |
|---|---|---|---|---|---|---|---|---|---|---|
| Vissel Kobe | 2000 | J1 League | 0 | 0 | 0 | 0 | 0 | 0 | 0 | 0 |
| Vissel Kobe | 2001 | J1 League | 0 | 0 | 0 | 0 | 0 | 0 | 0 | 0] |
| Vissel Kobe | 2002 | J1 League | 0 | 0 | 0 | 0 | 1 | 0 | 1 | 0 |
| Vissel Kobe | 2003 | J1 League | 1 | 0 | 0 | 0 | 0 | 0 | 1 | 0 |
| Vissel Kobe | 2004 | J1 League | 6 | 0 | 0 | 0 | 2 | 0 | 8 | 0 |
| Júbilo Iwata | 2004 | J1 League | 7 | 0 | 3 | 0 | 0 | 0 | 10 | 0 |
| Thespa Kusatsu | 2005 | J2 League | 21 | 0 | 1 | 0 | — | | 22 | 0 |
| Avispa Fukuoka | 2006 | J1 League | 0 | 0 | 0 | 0 | 1 | 0 | 1 | 0 |
| Yokohama FC | 2007 | J1 League | 0 | 0 | 0 | 0 | 1 | 0 | 1 | 0 |
| Yokohama FC | 2008 | J2 League | 4 | 0 | 0 | 0 | — | | 4 | 0 |
| Yokohama FC | 2009 | J2 League | 17 | 0 | 0 | 0 | — | | 17 | 0 |
| Yokohama FC | 2010 | J2 League | 0 | 0 | 0 | 0 | — | | 0 | 0 |
| Roasso Kumamoto | 2011 | J2 League | 0 | 0 | 1 | 0 | — | | 1 | 0 |
| Roasso Kumamoto | 2012 | J2 League | 4 | 0 | 1 | 0 | — | | 5 | 0 |
| V-Varen Nagasaki | 2013 | J2 League | 3 | 0 | 0 | 0 | — | | 3 | 0 |
| Thespakusatsu Gunma | 2014 | J2 League | 0 | 0 | 0 | 0 | — | | 0 | 0 |
| Career total | | | 63 | 0 | 6 | 0 | 5 | 0 | 74 | 0 |
