= 2010 Yokohama FC season =

Yokohama FC
2010 season
- Manager: Yasuyuki Kishino
- Stadium: Nippatsu Mitsuzawa Stadium
- J.League 2: 6th
- Emperor's Cup: 3rd Round
- Top goalscorer: Masashi Oguro (12)

2010 Yokohama FC season

== Competitions ==
Competitions	Position
J.League 2	6th / 19 clubs
Emperor's Cup	3rd round

== Player statistics ==
No.	Pos.	Player	D.o.B. (Age)	Height / Weight	J.League 2		Emperor's Cup		Total	
No.	Pos.	Player	D.o.B. (Age)	Height / Weight	Apps	Goals	Apps	Goals	Apps	Goals
1	GK	Takuo Ōkubo	September 18, 1989 (aged 20)	cm / kg	7	0				
2	DF	Tomonobu Hayakawa	July 11, 1977 (aged 32)	cm / kg	17	1				
3	MF	Roberto	February 20, 1979 (aged 31)	cm / kg	20	1				
4	DF	Kenta Togawa	June 23, 1981 (aged 28)	cm / kg	15	1				
5	MF	Tsuyoshi Hakkaku	April 20, 1985 (aged 24)	cm / kg	24	0				
6	MF	Keiji Takachi	April 23, 1980 (aged 29)	cm / kg	32	8				
7	FW	Eder	August 21, 1989 (aged 20)	cm / kg	19	0				
8	MF	Tomoyoshi Ono	August 12, 1979 (aged 30)	cm / kg	11	0				
9	FW	Masashi Oguro	May 4, 1980 (aged 29)	cm / kg	16	12				
10	MF	Silvinho	January 17, 1977 (aged 33)	cm / kg	11	0				
10	FW	Kaio	July 6, 1987 (aged 22)	cm / kg	17	6				
11	FW	Kazuyoshi Miura	February 26, 1967 (aged 43)	cm / kg	10	3				
13	DF	Shosuke Katayama	September 8, 1983 (aged 26)	cm / kg	7	0				
13	MF	Yosuke Nozaki	February 16, 1985 (aged 25)	cm / kg	14	0				
14	DF	Terukazu Tanaka	July 14, 1985 (aged 24)	cm / kg	12	0				
15	DF	Kim Yoo-Jin	June 19, 1983 (aged 26)	cm / kg	19	0				
16	GK	Fumiya Iwamaru	December 4, 1981 (aged 28)	cm / kg	0	0				
17	MF	Atsuhiro Miura	July 24, 1974 (aged 35)	cm / kg	2	0				
18	FW	Go Nishida	September 14, 1986 (aged 23)	cm / kg	29	7				
19	FW	Hiroaki Namba	December 9, 1982 (aged 27)	cm / kg	30	5				
20	DF	Masaki Watanabe	December 2, 1986 (aged 23)	cm / kg	30	3				
21	GK	Junnosuke Schneider	May 22, 1977 (aged 32)	cm / kg	17	0				
22	DF	Kentaro Nakata	May 13, 1989 (aged 20)	cm / kg	0	0				
23	FW	Yuta Nakano	August 30, 1989 (aged 20)	cm / kg	0	0				
24	MF	Shingo Nejime	December 22, 1984 (aged 25)	cm / kg	10	0				
25	MF	Takahiro Nakazato	March 29, 1990 (aged 19)	cm / kg	2	0				
26	DF	Ryuji Ito	July 23, 1990 (aged 19)	cm / kg	0	0				
26	DF	Takumi Abe	May 26, 1991 (aged 18)	cm / kg	16	1				
27	MF	Ken Hisatomi	September 29, 1990 (aged 19)	cm / kg	2	0				
28	MF	Yuto Takeoka	June 24, 1986 (aged 23)	cm / kg	21	0				
29	MF	Yuta Hashimura	September 10, 1991 (aged 18)	cm / kg	0	0				
31	GK	Kentaro Seki	March 9, 1986 (aged 23)	cm / kg	13	0				
33	DF	Masayuki Yanagisawa	August 27, 1979 (aged 30)	cm / kg	31	0				
36	MF	Shinichi Terada	June 10, 1985 (aged 24)	cm / kg	28	4				
37	FW	Sales	June 9, 1986 (aged 23)	cm / kg	6	0				
38	FW	Satoshi Kukino	April 16, 1987 (aged 22)	cm / kg	15	2				

== Other pages ==
- (in Japanese) J. League official site
