= Amarildo (footballer, born 1986) =

Brazilian footballer

Personal information
- Full name: Amarildo de Jesus Santos
- Date of birth: July 6, 1986 (age 40)
- Place of birth: Brazil
- Height: 1.85 m (6 ft 1 in)
- Position: Defender

Senior career*
Years	Team	Apps	(Gls)
2006	Shonan Bellmare	3	(0)
- * Club domestic league appearances and goals

Amarildo de Jesus Santos (born July 6, 1986), known as just Amarildo, is a Brazilian football player.

== Club statistics ==
Club performance			League		Cup		Total	
Season	Club	League	Apps	Goals	Apps	Goals	Apps	Goals
Japan			League		Emperor's Cup		Total	
2006	Shonan Bellmare	J2 League	3	0				
Country	Japan		3	0				
Total			3	0				
