= Tomoyuki Yoshino =

Japanese footballer

Tomoyuki Yoshino 吉野 智行
Personal information
- Full name: Tomoyuki Yoshino
- Date of birth: July 9, 1980 (age 46)
- Place of birth: Kanagawa, Japan
- Height: 1.78 m (5 ft 10 in)
- Position: Midfielder

Youth career
- 1996–1998: Narashino High School

Senior career*
Years	Team	Apps	(Gls)
1999–2002	Urawa Reds	28	(3)
2002–2005	Shonan Bellmare	122	(1)
2006–2007	Yokohama FC	35	(0)
2008–2013	Gainare Tottori	127	(20)
Total		312	(24)
Medal record
Urawa Reds
Runner-up	J.League Cup	2002
- * Club domestic league appearances and goals

Tomoyuki Yoshino (吉野 智行, Yoshino Tomoyuki; born July 9, 1980) is a former Japanese soccer player. In 2023, he was appointed as the sporting director of Shonan Bellmare.

== Playing career ==
Yoshino was born in Kanagawa Prefecture on July 9, 1980. After graduating from high school, he joined J1 League club Urawa Reds in 1999. He played as offensive midfielder from first season. However he could hardly play in the match from 2001. In May 2002, he moved to J2 League club Shonan Bellmare. He became a regular player and played many matches. In 2006, he moved to Yokohama FC. He played many matches and the club won the champions in 2006 and was promoted to J1 from 2007. However his opportunity to play decreased in 2007. In 2008, he moved to Japan Football League club Gainare Tottori. He played many matches as regular player. In 2010, although he could not play many matches for injury, the club won the champions and was promoted to J2 from 2011. However he could not play many matches for injuries and retired end of 2013 season.

== Career statistics ==
Appearances and goals by club, season and competition
Club	Season	League			Emperor's Cup		J.League Cup		Total	
Club	Season	Division	Apps	Goals	Apps	Goals	Apps	Goals	Apps	Goals
Urawa Reds	1999	J1 League	7	0	0	0	0	0	7	0
Urawa Reds	2000	J2 League	20	3	3	1	2	0	25	4
Urawa Reds	2001	J1 League	1	0	0	0	0	0	1	0
Urawa Reds	2002	J1 League	0	0	0	0	0	0	0	0
Shonan Bellmare	2002	J2 League	27	1	4	0	—		31	1
Shonan Bellmare	2003	J2 League	40	0	0	0	—		40	0
Shonan Bellmare	2004	J2 League	23	0	3	0	—		26	0
Shonan Bellmare	2005	J2 League	32	0	1	0	—		33	0
Yokohama FC	2006	J2 League	25	0	1	0	—		26	0
Yokohama FC	2007	J1 League	10	0	2	0	3	0	15	0
Gainare Tottori	2008	Football League	31	7	1	0	—		32	7
Gainare Tottori	2009	Football League	33	8	1	0	—		34	8
Gainare Tottori	2010	Football League	16	3	0	0	—		16	3
Gainare Tottori	2011	J2 League	20	1	1	1	—		21	2
Gainare Tottori	2012	J2 League	20	1	1	0	—		21	1
Gainare Tottori	2013	J2 League	7	0	0	0	—		7	0
Career total			312	19	18	2	5	0	335	21
