= Hiroaki Namba =

Japanese footballer

Hiroaki Namba 難波 宏明
Personal information
- Full name: Hiroaki Namba
- Date of birth: December 9, 1982 (age 43)
- Place of birth: Okayama, Japan
- Height: 1.72 m (5 ft 7 1/2 in)
- Position: Forward

Youth career
- 1998–2000: Kasaoka Technical High School
- 2003–2006: Ryutsu Keizai University

Senior career*
Years	Team	Apps	(Gls)
2001	Vissel Kobe	0	(0)
2002	Tochigi SC	14	(2)
2006–2012	Yokohama FC	154	(30)
2013	Mito HollyHock	26	(1)
2014–2018	FC Gifu	159	(37)
Total		353	(70)
- * Club domestic league appearances and goals

Hiroaki Namba (難波 宏明, Namba Hiroaki; born December 9, 1982) is a former Japanese football player.

== Playing career ==
Namba was born in Okayama Prefecture on December 9, 1982. After graduating from high school, he joined J1 League club Vissel Kobe in 2001. However he could not play at all in the match. In 2002, he moved to Japan Football League club Tochigi SC. Although he played many matches in 2002 season, he left the club and went on to Ryutsu Keizai University in 2003. In 2006, he joined J2 League club Yokohama FC. On September 27, he debuted in J.League as substitute forward against Vegalta Sendai and scored a goal this match.

Although he could only play this match in 2006 season, Yokohama FC won the champions and was promoted to J1 first time in the club history. In 2007, although he played many matches from opening the season, he could hardly play in the match from summer. Yokohama FC also finished at the bottom place and was relegated to J2 in a year. From 2008, he became a regular player and played many matches until 2011. However he could not play many matches in 2012. In 2013, he moved to Mito HollyHock and played many matches. In 2014, he moved to FC Gifu. Although the club results were bad, he played many matches as forward for long time. He retired end of 2018 season.

== Club statistics ==
Updated to 19 February 2019.

Club performance			League		Cup		League Cup		Total	
Season	Club	League	Apps	Goals	Apps	Goals	Apps	Goals	Apps	Goals
Japan			League		Emperor's Cup		J.League Cup		Total	
2001	Vissel Kobe	J1 League	0	0	0	0	0	0	0	0
2002	Tochigi SC	JFL	14	2	0	0	-		14	2
2006	Yokohama FC	J2 League	1	1	0	0	-		1	1
2007	Yokohama FC	J1 League	18	3	1	0	5	0	24	3
2008	Yokohama FC	J2 League	25	7	1	0	-		26	7
2009	Yokohama FC	J2 League	42	8	2	2	-		44	10
2010	Yokohama FC	J2 League	30	5	2	1	-		32	6
2011	Yokohama FC	J2 League	29	6	1	0	-		30	6
2012	Yokohama FC	J2 League	9	0	2	0	-		11	0
2013	Mito HollyHock	J2 League	26	1	1	0	-		27	1
2014	FC Gifu	J2 League	34	12	1	0	-		35	12
2015	FC Gifu	J2 League	38	12	1	0	-		39	12
2016	FC Gifu	J2 League	20	3	0	0	-		20	3
2017	FC Gifu	J2 League	37	9	2	0	-		39	9
2018	FC Gifu	J2 League	30	1	1	0	-		31	1
Career total			353	70	15	3	5	0	373	73
