= Shingo Nejime =

Japanese footballer

Shingo Nejime 根占 真伍
Personal information
- Full name: Shingo Nejime
- Date of birth: December 22, 1984 (age 41)
- Place of birth: Tokyo, Japan
- Height: 1.73 m (5 ft 8 in)
- Position: Midfielder

Youth career
- 2000–2002: Tokyo Verdy

Senior career*
Years	Team	Apps	(Gls)
2003–2006	Tokyo Verdy	43	(1)
2007–2010	Yokohama FC	91	(8)
2011–2012	Roasso Kumamoto	41	(5)
2013–2014	Churchill Brothers		
Total		175	(14)

International career
2001	Japan U-17	3	(0)
Medal record
Tokyo Verdy
Winner	Emperor's Cup	2004
- * Club domestic league appearances and goals

Shingo Nejime (根占 真伍, Nejime Shingo; born December 22, 1984) is a former Japanese football player.

== Club career ==
Nejime was born in Tokyo on December 22, 1984. He joined Tokyo Verdy from youth team in 2003. Although he played many matches from first season, he could hardly play in the match in 2004 and 2005. The club was also relegated to J2 League end of 2005 season. In 2006, he played many matches and he moved to Yokohama FC in 2007. At Yokohama FC, although he played many matches, his opportunity to play decreased in 2010. He moved to Roasso Kumamoto in 2011 and played until 2012. He moved to India and joined Churchill Brothers in 2013. He retired in 2014.

== International career ==
In September 2001, Nejime was selected Japan U-17 national team for 2001 U-17 World Championship. He played all 3 matches.

== Career statistics ==
Appearances and goals by club, season and competition
Club	Season	League			Emperor's Cup		J.League Cup		Total	
Club	Season	Division	Apps	Goals	Apps	Goals	Apps	Goals	Apps	Goals
Tokyo Verdy	2003	J1 League	15	1	2	0	4	0	21	1
Tokyo Verdy	2004	J1 League	1	0	0	0	3	0	4	0
Tokyo Verdy	2005	J1 League	0	0	0	0	0	0	0	0
Tokyo Verdy	2006	J2 League	27	0	1	0	—		28	0
Yokohama FC	2007	J1 League	23	3	2	1	5	0	30	4
Yokohama FC	2008	J2 League	36	4	1	0	—		37	4
Yokohama FC	2009	J2 League	22	1	1	0	—		23	1
Yokohama FC	2010	J2 League	10	0	1	0	—		11	0
Roasso Kumamoto	2011	J2 League	27	4	0	0	—		27	4
Roasso Kumamoto	2012	J2 League	14	1	0	0	—		14	1
Career total			175	14	8	1	12	0	195	15
