= Tomonobu Hayakawa =

Japanese footballer

Tomonobu Hayakawa 早川 知伸
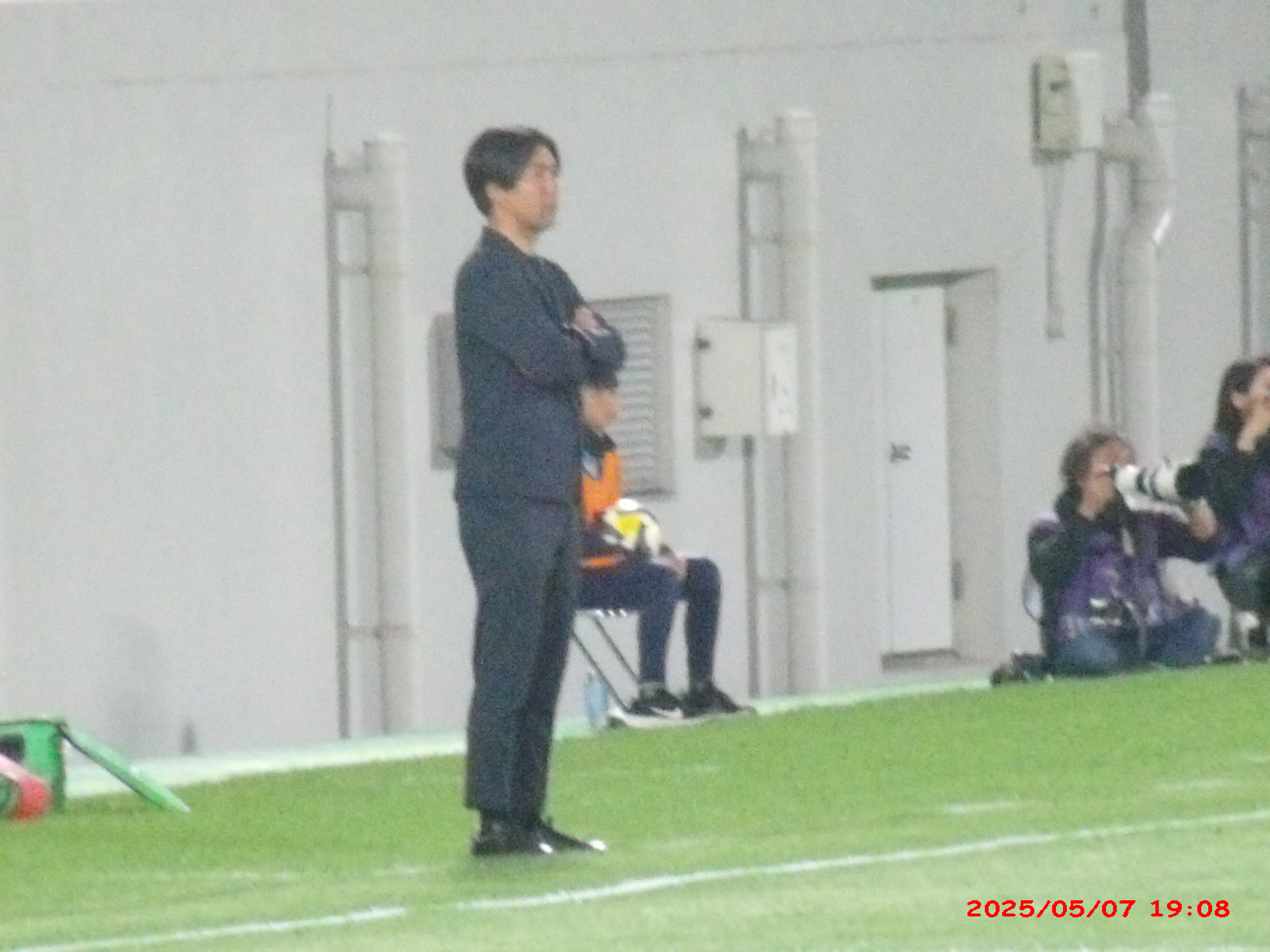

Personal information
- Full name: Tomonobu Hayakawa
- Date of birth: 11 July 1977 (age 49)
- Place of birth: Shizuoka, Japan
- Height: 1.83 m (6 ft 0 in)
- Position: Defender

Youth career
- 1993–1995: Shimizu Commercial High School
- 1996–1999: Juntendo University

Senior career*
Years	Team	Apps	(Gls)
2000–2002	Urawa Red Diamonds	1	(0)
2003–2010	Yokohama FC	218	(12)
2008	→ JEF United Chiba (loan)	5	(0)
Total		224	(12)

Managerial career
- 2021: Yokohama FC
- 2025: Matsumoto Yamaga
Medal record
Urawa Red Diamonds
Runner-up	J.League Cup	2002
- * Club domestic league appearances and goals

Tomonobu Hayakawa (早川 知伸, Hayakawa Tomonobu; born July 11, 1977) is a Japanese football manager and former player who is the manager of J3 League club Matsumoto Yamaga.

== Playing career ==
Hayakawa was born in Shizuoka on July 11, 1977. After graduating from Juntendo University, he joined J2 League club Urawa Red Diamonds in 2000. Although the club was promoted to J1 League from 2001, he could hardly play in the match in 3 seasons until 2002. In 2003, he moved to J2 club Yokohama FC. He played many matches as right side back and center back for a long time. In 2006, he played as center back and the club won the champions and was promoted to J1 from 2007. Although he played many matches in 2007, the club was relegated to J2 in a year and his opportunity to play decreased in 2008. In August 2008, he moved to the J1 club JEF United Chiba on loan. However he could not play many matches. In 2009, he returned to Yokohama FC. Although he played many matches as a regular player in 2009, his opportunity to play decreased in 2010 and he retired at the end of the 2010 season.

== Managerial career ==
On 8 April 2021, Hayakawa was appointed as the manager of Yokohama FC. On 10 December 2021, Hayakawa resigned as manager of Yokohama FC and became assistant manager.

On 20 December 2022, Hayakawa was appointed assistant manager of Matsumoto Yamaga for the upcoming 2023 season.

Following the departure of Masahiro Shimoda at the end of the 2024 season, on 19 December 2024 it was announced that Hayakawa would become manager of Matsumoto Yamaga.

== Career statistics ==
Appearances and goals by club, season and competition
Club	Season	League			Emperor's Cup		J.League Cup		Total	
Club	Season	Division	Apps	Goals	Apps	Goals	Apps	Goals	Apps	Goals
Urawa Red Diamonds	2000	J2 League	0	0	1	0	0	0	1	0
Urawa Red Diamonds	2001	J1 League	1	0	0	0	0	0	1	0
Urawa Red Diamonds	2002	J1 League	0	0	0	0	0	0	0	0
Yokohama FC	2003	J2 League	21	1	1	0	—		22	1
Yokohama FC	2004	J2 League	39	3	0	0	—		39	3
Yokohama FC	2005	J2 League	31	0	1	0	—		32	0
Yokohama FC	2006	J2 League	39	3	0	0	—		39	3
Yokohama FC	2007	J1 League	23	1	1	0	3	0	27	1
Yokohama FC	2008	J2 League	6	0	0	0	—		6	0
JEF United Chiba	2008	J1 League	5	0	1	0	0	0	6	0
Yokohama FC	2009	J2 League	42	3	1	0	—		43	3
Yokohama FC	2010	J2 League	17	1	2	0	—		19	1
Career total			224	12	8	0	3	0	235	12

== Managerial statistics ==
As of the start from 2025 season.

Team	From	To	Record				
Team	From	To	G	W	D	L	Win %
Yokohama FC	8 April 2021	10 December 2021	30	6	8	16	20.00
Matsumoto Yamaga	19 December 2024	present	0	0	0	0	—
