= Chong Yong-de =

Zainichi Korean footballer (born 1978)

Chong Yong-De
Personal information
- Full name: Chong Yong-De
- Date of birth: 4 February 1978 (age 48)
- Place of birth: Nagoya, Aichi, Japan
- Height: 5 ft 10 in (1.78 m)
- Position: Midfielder

Senior career*
Years	Team	Apps	(Gls)
2000	Ome FC		
2001	Pohang Steelers	4	(0)
2002–2004	Nagoya Grampus Eight	9	(0)
2002	→ Cerezo Osaka (Loan)	11	(0)
2005	Kawasaki Frontale	7	(0)
2006–2007	Yokohama FC	56	(2)
2007–2008	Consadole Sapporo	21	(0)
2009	Yokohama FC	33	(1)
Total		141	(3)
- * Club domestic league appearances and goals

Chong Yong-De (Korean: 정용대; Hanja: 鄭容臺; born 4 February 1978), is a former Japanese-born South Korean midfielder.

== Club statistics ==
Club performance			League		Cup		League Cup		Total	
Season	Club	League	Apps	Goals	Apps	Goals	Apps	Goals	Apps	Goals
Japan			League		Emperor's Cup		J.League Cup		Total	
2002	Nagoya Grampus Eight	J1 League	0	0	0	0	0	0	0	0
2002	Cerezo Osaka	J2 League	11	0	0	0	-		11	0
2003	Nagoya Grampus Eight	J1 League	6	0	1	0	1	0	8	0
2004	Nagoya Grampus Eight	J1 League	3	0	0	0	1	0	4	0
2005	Kawasaki Frontale	J1 League	7	0	1	0	0	0	8	0
2006	Yokohama FC	J2 League	44	2	0	0	-		44	2
2007	Yokohama FC	J1 League	12	0	0	0	5	0	17	0
2007	Consadole Sapporo	J2 League	10	0	0	0	-		10	0
2008	Consadole Sapporo	J1 League	11	0	0	0	2	1	13	1
2009	Yokohama FC	J2 League	39	1	1	0	-		40	1
Total			143	3	3	0	9	1	155	4
