= Masafumi Maeda =

Japanese footballer

Personal information
- Date of birth: January 25, 1983 (age 43)
- Place of birth: Yasu, Shiga, Japan
- Height: 1.73 m (5 ft 8 in)
- Position: Forward

Youth career
- 2001–2004: Kansai University

Senior career*
Years	Team	Apps	(Gls)
2005–2007	Gamba Osaka	38	(4)
2008–2009	Ventforet Kofu	16	(1)
2010–2011	Thespa Kusatsu	16	(1)
Total		70	(6)
Medal record
Gamba Osaka
Winner	J1 League	2005
Winner	J.League Cup	2007
Runner-up	J.League Cup	2005
Runner-up	Emperor's Cup	2006
- * Club domestic league appearances and goals

Masafumi Maeda (前田 雅文, Maeda Masafumi; born January 25, 1983) is a former Japanese football player.

== Club statistics ==
Club performance			League		Cup		League Cup		Continental		Total	
Season	Club	League	Apps	Goals	Apps	Goals	Apps	Goals	Apps	Goals	Apps	Goals
Japan			League		Emperor's Cup		J.League Cup		Asia		Total	
2005	Gamba Osaka	J1 League	6	1	0	0	4	1	-		10	2
2006	Gamba Osaka	J1 League	27	2	3	1	2	0	5	2	37	5
2007	Gamba Osaka	J1 League	5	1	1	0	5	0	-		11	1
2008	Ventforet Kofu	J2 League	16	1	0	0	-		-		16	1
2009	Ventforet Kofu	J2 League	0	0	0	0	-		-		0	0
2010	Thespa Kusatsu	J2 League	11	0	0	0	-		-		11	0
2011	Thespa Kusatsu	J2 League					-		-			
Total			65	5	4	1	11	1	5	2	85	9
