= Kenji Koyama =

Japanese footballer

Kenji Koyama 小山 健二
Personal information
- Full name: Kenji Koyama
- Date of birth: September 5, 1972 (age 54)
- Place of birth: Hiroshima, Japan
- Height: 1.85 m (6 ft 1 in)
- Position: Goalkeeper

Youth career
- 1988–1990: Itsukaichi High School
- 1991–1994: Fukuoka University

Senior career*
Years	Team	Apps	(Gls)
1995–2003	Oita Trinita		
2004–2009	Yokohama FC	46	(0)
- * Club domestic league appearances and goals

Kenji Koyama (小山 健二, Koyama Kenji; born September 5, 1972) is a former Japanese football player.

== Playing career ==
Koyama was born in Hiroshima Prefecture on September 5, 1972. After graduating from Fukuoka University, he joined the Regional Leagues club Oita Trinity (later Oita Trinita) in 1995. He played many matches as a regular goalkeeper and the club was promoted to the Japan Football League in 1996 and the J2 League in 1999. However he did not play as often as new members Kazuya Maekawa (2000-01) and Hayato Okanaka (2002-03) in 2000. Although the club won the championship in 2002 and was promoted to the J1 League in 2003, he did not play in any matches. In 2004, he moved to the J2 club Yokohama FC. However he was not played as often as Takanori Sugeno. The club won the championship in 2006 and was promoted to J1 in 2007. However he did not play at all in J1 matches and the club was relegated to J2 the next year. In 2008, Sugeno left the club wand Koyama became a regular goalkeeper. However he did not play as often as young goalkeeper Takuo Okubo in 2009 and retired at the end of the 2009 season.

== Club statistics ==
Club performance			League		Cup		League Cup		Total	
Season	Club	League	Apps	Goals	Apps	Goals	Apps	Goals	Apps	Goals
Japan			League		Emperor's Cup		J.League Cup		Total	
1995	Oita Trinity	Regional Leagues								
1996	Oita Trinity	Football League	23	0	3	0	-		26	0
1997	Oita Trinity	Football League	30	0	2	0	-		32	0
1998	Oita Trinity	Football League	30	0	3	0	-		33	0
1999	Oita Trinita	J2 League	36	0	3	0	4	0	43	0
2000	Oita Trinita	J2 League	4	0	3	0	2	0	9	0
2001	Oita Trinita	J2 League	7	0	0	0	2	0	9	0
2002	Oita Trinita	J2 League	3	0	0	0	-		3	0
2003	Oita Trinita	J1 League	0	0	1	0	1	0	2	0
2004	Yokohama FC	J2 League	0	0	0	0	-		0	0
2005	Yokohama FC	J2 League	7	0	1	0	-		8	0
2006	Yokohama FC	J2 League	0	0	1	0	-		1	0
2007	Yokohama FC	J1 League	0	0	0	0	0	0	0	0
2008	Yokohama FC	J2 League	38	0	2	0	-		40	0
2009	Yokohama FC	J2 League	1	0	0	0	-		1	0
Total			179	0	19	0	9	0	207	0
