= Sunao Hozaki =

Japanese footballer

Sunao Hozaki 保﨑 淳
Personal information
- Full name: Sunao Hozaki
- Date of birth: 14 March 1987 (age 39)
- Place of birth: Saitama, Japan
- Height: 1.71 m (5 ft 7 1/2 in)
- Position: Defender

Team information
- Current team: SC Sagamihara
- Number: 17

Youth career
- 2002–2004: Yokohama F. Marinos Youth
- 2005–2008: Ryutsu Keizai University

Senior career*
| Years | Team | Apps | (Gls) |
| 2009–2011 | Mito HollyHock | 86 | (4) |
| 2012–2013 | Thespakusatsu Gunma | 35 | (0) |
| 2014 | Zweigen Kanazawa | 29 | (1) |
| 2015 | Suzuka Unlimited FC | 12 | (0) |
| 2016–2018 | SC Sagamihara | 71 | (6) |
- * Club domestic league appearances and goals as of 23 February 2019

Sunao Hozaki (保﨑 淳, Hozaki Sunao; born 14 March 1987) is a Japanese footballer for SC Sagamihara.

== Career statistics ==
Updated to 23 February 2018.

| Club performance | | | League | | Cup | | Total | |
| Season | Club | League | Apps | Goals | Apps | Goals | Apps | Goals |
| Japan | | | League | | Emperor's Cup | | Total | |
|---|---|---|---|---|---|---|---|---|
| 2009 | Mito HollyHock | J2 League | 39 | 2 | 1 | 0 | 40 | 2 |
| 2010 | Mito HollyHock | J2 League | 23 | 1 | 2 | 1 | 25 | 2 |
| 2011 | Mito HollyHock | J2 League | 24 | 1 | 1 | 0 | 25 | 1 |
| 2012 | Thespa Kusatsu | J2 League | 10 | 0 | 0 | 0 | 10 | 0 |
| 2013 | Thespakusatsu Gunma | J2 League | 25 | 0 | 0 | 0 | 25 | 0 |
| 2014 | Zweigen Kanazawa | J3 League | 29 | 1 | 2 | 0 | 31 | 1 |
| 2015 | Suzuka Unlimited FC | JRL | 12 | 0 | - | | 12 | 0 |
| 2016 | SC Sagamihara | J3 League | 19 | 2 | – | | 19 | 2 |
| 2017 | SC Sagamihara | J3 League | 29 | 4 | – | | 29 | 4 |
| Career total | | | 210 | 11 | 6 | 1 | 216 | 12 |
