= Yuki Ozawa =

Japanese footballer

Personal information
- Full name: Yuki Ozawa
- Date of birth: October 4, 1983 (age 43)
- Place of birth: Shizuoka, Japan
- Height: 1.73 m (5 ft 8 in)
- Position: Defender

Team information
- Current team: Kamatamare Sanuki
- Number: 2

Youth career
- 1999–2001: Fujieda Meisei High School

Senior career*
Years	Team	Apps	(Gls)
2003–2007	VV SHO		
2008–2009	Mito HollyHock	78	(1)
2010–2011	Shonan Bellmare	11	(0)
2012–2013	SC Sagamihara	52	(1)
2014–	Kamatamare Sanuki	79	(0)
- * Club domestic league appearances and goals as of 23 February 2016

Yuki Ozawa (小澤 雄希, Ozawa Yūki; born October 4, 1983 in Shizuoka) is a Japanese football player currently playing for Kamatamare Sanuki. He previously played in the Netherlands.

== Career statistics ==
Updated to 23 February 2016.

Club performance			League		Cup		League Cup		Total	
Season	Club	League	Apps	Goals	Apps	Goals	Apps	Goals	Apps	Goals
Japan			League		Emperor's Cup		League Cup		Total	
2008	Mito HollyHock	J2 League	30	0	2	0	-		32	0
2009	Mito HollyHock	J2 League	48	1	0	0	-		48	1
2010	Shonan Bellmare	J1 League	11	0	1	0	5	0	17	0
2011	Shonan Bellmare	J2 League	0	0	1	0	-		1	0
2012	SC Sagamihara	JRL	18	0	-		-		18	0
2013	SC Sagamihara	JFL	34	1	-		-		34	1
2014	Kamatamare Sanuki	J2 League	41	0	1	0	-		42	0
2015	Kamatamare Sanuki	J2 League	38	0	1	0	-		39	0
Career total			220	2	6	0	5	0	231	2
