= Sho Gokyu =

Japanese footballer

Sho Gokyu 御給 匠
Personal information
- Full name: Sho Gokyu
- Date of birth: June 11, 1983 (age 43)
- Place of birth: Tsu, Mie, Japan
- Height: 1.87 m (6 ft 1 1/2 in)
- Position: Forward

Youth career
- 1999–2001: Tsu Technical High School

Senior career*
Years	Team	Apps	(Gls)
2002–2004	Cerezo Osaka	8	(1)
2005	Thespa Kusatsu	19	(1)
2006–2007	Sagawa Express	64	(51)
2008–2009	Yokohama FC	24	(4)
2009	FC Machida Zelvia	10	(4)
2010–2012	Sagawa Shiga	61	(37)
2013	SC Sagamihara	31	(12)
2014–2015	FC Osaka	15	(5)
Total		232	(115)
Medal record
Cerezo Osaka
Runner-up	Emperor's Cup	2003
- * Club domestic league appearances and goals

Sho Gokyu (御給 匠, Gokyū Shō; born June 11, 1983) is a former Japanese football player.

== Playing career ==
Gokyu was born in Tsu on June 11, 1983. After graduating from high school, he joined J2 League club Cerezo Osaka in 2002. Although he could not play at all in the match, Cerezo was promoted to J1 League end of 2002 season. Although he debuted in September 2003 and played several matches as forward, he could not play many matches until 2004. In 2005, he moved to newly was promoted to J2 club, Thespa Kusatsu. Although he played many matches, he could only score 1 goal. In 2006, he moved to Japan Football League (JFL) club Sagawa Express Osaka (later Sagawa Express, Sagawa Shiga). He became a regular forward and scored many goals. He also became a top scorer with 30 goals in 2007 season. In 2008, he moved to J2 club Yokohama FC. However he could not play many matches. In August 2009, he moved to JFL club FC Machida Zelvia and played many matches. In 2010, he re-joined Sagawa Shiga for the first time in 3 years. He played as regular forward and became a top scorer with 27 goals in 2010 season. However his opportunity to play decreased from 2011 and the club was disbanded end of 2012 season. In 2013, he moved to JFL club SC Sagamihara and played many matches as regular forward. In 2014, he moved to Regional Leagues club FC Osaka. The club was promoted to JFL from 2015. He retired end of 2015 season.

== Club statistics ==
Club performance			League		Cup		League Cup		Total	
Season	Club	League	Apps	Goals	Apps	Goals	Apps	Goals	Apps	Goals
Japan			League		Emperor's Cup		J.League Cup		Total	
2002	Cerezo Osaka	J2 League	0	0	0	0	-		0	0
2003	Cerezo Osaka	J1 League	4	1	0	0	0	0	4	1
2004	Cerezo Osaka	J1 League	4	0	0	0	1	0	5	0
2005	Thespa Kusatsu	J2 League	19	1	1	0	-		20	1
2006	Sagawa Express Osaka	Football League	30	21	-		-		30	21
2007	Sagawa Express	Football League	34	30	2	2	-		36	32
2008	Yokohama FC	J2 League	16	3	2	0	-		18	3
2009	Yokohama FC	J2 League	8	1	0	0	-		8	1
2009	FC Machida Zelvia	Football League	10	4	-		-		10	4
2010	Sagawa Shiga	Football League	30	27	1	1	-		31	28
2011	Sagawa Shiga	Football League	21	9	1	0	-		22	9
2012	Sagawa Shiga	Football League	10	1	3	2	-		13	3
2013	SC Sagamihara	Football League	31	12	-		-		31	12
2014	FC Osaka	Regional Leagues	9	5	1	0	-		10	5
2015	FC Osaka	Football League	6	0	0	0	-		6	0
Total			232	115	11	5	1	0	244	120
