= 2013 Gainare Tottori season =

Gainare Tottori
2013 season
- Manager: Norio Omura; Koji Maeda
- Stadium: Tottori Bank Bird Stadium
- J2 League: 22nd of 22 (Relegated)
- Emperor's Cup: 2nd round
| Home colours | Away colours |

2013 Gainare Tottori season.

== Competitions ==
=== Emperor's Cup ===
2nd round lost to Giravanz Kitakyushu

=== League table ===
| Pos | Team | Pld | W | D | L | GF | GA | GD | Pts | Promotion or relegation |
|---|---|---|---|---|---|---|---|---|---|---|
| 18 | Kataller Toyama | 42 | 11 | 11 | 20 | 45 | 59 | −14 | 44 | |
| 19 | Roasso Kumamoto | 42 | 10 | 13 | 19 | 40 | 70 | −30 | 43 | |
| 20 | Thespakusatsu Gunma | 42 | 9 | 13 | 20 | 43 | 61 | −18 | 40 | |
| 21 | FC Gifu | 42 | 9 | 10 | 23 | 37 | 80 | −43 | 37 | Ineligible for promotion |
| 22 | Gainare Tottori (R) | 42 | 5 | 16 | 21 | 38 | 74 | −36 | 31 | Qualification for Relegation Playoffs (Note: Promotion/relegation play-offs between J2 and JFL tooke place between Kamatamare Sanuki, 2nd-placed club of 2013 Japan Football League with J. League Associate Membership, and 22nd-ranked club of 2013 J2 season.) |

Updated to match(es) played on 8 December 2013. Source: J.League Division 2
Rules for classification: 1) points; 2) goal difference; 3) number of goals scored.
(R) Relegated

== J2 League ==
| Match | Date | Team | Score | Team | Venue | Attendance |
|---|---|---|---|---|---|---|
| 1 | 2013.03.03 | Roasso Kumamoto | 1-2 | Gainare Tottori | Umakana-Yokana Stadium | 11,116 |
| 2 | 2013.03.10 | Thespakusatsu Gunma | 0-0 | Gainare Tottori | Shoda Shoyu Stadium Gunma | 3,635 |
| 3 | 2013.03.17 | Gainare Tottori | 3-1 | Mito HollyHock | Tottori Bank Bird Stadium | 6,467 |
| 4 | 2013.03.20 | JEF United Chiba | 1-1 | Gainare Tottori | Fukuda Denshi Arena | 8,386 |
| 5 | 2013.03.24 | Gainare Tottori | 1-1 | Tochigi SC | Tottori Bank Bird Stadium | 2,900 |
| 6 | 2013.03.31 | V-Varen Nagasaki | 3-1 | Gainare Tottori | Nagasaki Stadium | 2,467 |
| 7 | 2013.04.07 | Gainare Tottori | 0-0 | Avispa Fukuoka | Tottori Bank Bird Stadium | 1,530 |
| 8 | 2013.04.14 | Tokyo Verdy | 3-0 | Gainare Tottori | Ajinomoto Stadium | 3,916 |
| 9 | 2013.04.17 | Gainare Tottori | 0-2 | Consadole Sapporo | Tottori Bank Bird Stadium | 1,711 |
| 10 | 2013.04.21 | Kyoto Sanga FC | 3-0 | Gainare Tottori | Kyoto Nishikyogoku Athletic Stadium | 4,692 |
| 11 | 2013.04.28 | Gamba Osaka | 1-1 | Gainare Tottori | Expo '70 Commemorative Stadium | 16,803 |
| 12 | 2013.05.03 | Gainare Tottori | 0-1 | Tokushima Vortis | Tottori Bank Bird Stadium | 6,123 |
| 13 | 2013.05.06 | Kataller Toyama | 1-1 | Gainare Tottori | Toyama Stadium | 2,820 |
| 14 | 2013.05.12 | Gainare Tottori | 0-0 | Fagiano Okayama | Tottori Bank Bird Stadium | 5,426 |
| 15 | 2013.05.19 | Gainare Tottori | 0-6 | Montedio Yamagata | Tottori Bank Bird Stadium | 1,677 |
| 16 | 2013.05.26 | Vissel Kobe | 0-1 | Gainare Tottori | Noevir Stadium Kobe | 12,654 |
| 17 | 2013.06.01 | Gainare Tottori | 1-0 | Matsumoto Yamaga FC | Tottori Bank Bird Stadium | 3,698 |
| 18 | 2013.06.08 | Yokohama FC | 2-1 | Gainare Tottori | NHK Spring Mitsuzawa Football Stadium | 11,482 |
| 19 | 2013.06.15 | Gainare Tottori | 3-4 | FC Gifu | Tottori Bank Bird Stadium | 3,941 |
| 20 | 2013.06.22 | Gainare Tottori | 2-3 | Giravanz Kitakyushu | Tottori Bank Bird Stadium | 3,793 |
| 21 | 2013.06.29 | Ehime FC | 1-0 | Gainare Tottori | Ningineer Stadium | 3,054 |
| 22 | 2013.07.03 | Montedio Yamagata | 2-3 | Gainare Tottori | ND Soft Stadium Yamagata | 5,128 |
| 23 | 2013.07.07 | Gainare Tottori | 1-1 | Tokyo Verdy | Tottori Bank Bird Stadium | 4,330 |
| 24 | 2013.07.14 | Gainare Tottori | 0-0 | Yokohama FC | Tottori Bank Bird Stadium | 6,536 |
| 25 | 2013.07.20 | Mito HollyHock | 2-2 | Gainare Tottori | K's denki Stadium Mito | 4,201 |
| 26 | 2013.07.27 | Consadole Sapporo | 3-0 | Gainare Tottori | Sapporo Dome | 12,696 |
| 27 | 2013.08.04 | Gainare Tottori | 0-0 | Roasso Kumamoto | Tottori Bank Bird Stadium | 3,890 |
| 28 | 2013.08.11 | Gainare Tottori | 2-3 | Kataller Toyama | Tottori Bank Bird Stadium | 3,537 |
| 29 | 2013.08.18 | Tochigi SC | 1-1 | Gainare Tottori | Tochigi Green Stadium | 5,579 |
| 30 | 2013.08.21 | Gainare Tottori | 1-7 | Gamba Osaka | Tottori Bank Bird Stadium | 10,096 |
| 31 | 2013.08.25 | Gainare Tottori | 0-3 | V-Varen Nagasaki | Tottori Bank Bird Stadium | 3,358 |
| 32 | 2013.09.01 | Matsumoto Yamaga FC | 2-1 | Gainare Tottori | Matsumotodaira Park Stadium | 10,993 |
| 33 | 2013.09.15 | Gainare Tottori | 1-1 | Ehime FC | Tottori Bank Bird Stadium | 2,223 |
| 34 | 2013.09.22 | FC Gifu | 2-1 | Gainare Tottori | Ogaki Asanaka Stadium | 3,369 |
| 35 | 2013.09.29 | Tokushima Vortis | 2-1 | Gainare Tottori | Pocarisweat Stadium | 4,508 |
| 36 | 2013.10.06 | Gainare Tottori | 0-1 | Kyoto Sanga FC | Tottori Bank Bird Stadium | 3,907 |
| 37 | 2013.10.20 | Avispa Fukuoka | 1-1 | Gainare Tottori | Level5 Stadium | 4,933 |
| 38 | 2013.10.27 | Gainare Tottori | 1-2 | Vissel Kobe | Tottori Bank Bird Stadium | 5,108 |
| 39 | 2013.11.03 | Fagiano Okayama | 2-0 | Gainare Tottori | Kanko Stadium | 6,782 |
| 40 | 2013.11.10 | Gainare Tottori | 1-1 | Thespakusatsu Gunma | Tottori Bank Bird Stadium | 2,222 |
| 41 | 2013.11.17 | Giravanz Kitakyushu | 2-1 | Gainare Tottori | Honjo Stadium | 4,205 |
| 42 | 2013.11.24 | Gainare Tottori | 2-2 | JEF United Chiba | Tottori Bank Bird Stadium | 3,560 |
