= Kenjiro Ezoe =

Japanese footballer

Personal information
- Full name: Kenjiro Ezoe
- Date of birth: August 25, 1982 (age 44)
- Place of birth: Okayama, Japan
- Height: 1.81 m (5 ft 11 1/2 in)
- Position: Defender

Youth career
- 2001–2004: Momoyama Gakuin University

Senior career*
Years	Team	Apps	(Gls)
2005–2009	Cerezo Osaka	115	(1)
2010–2011	Kataller Toyama	32	(2)
2012–2013	Sagawa Printing		
Total		147	(3)
- * Club domestic league appearances and goals

Kenjiro Ezoe (江添 建次郎, Ezoe Kenjirō; born August 25, 1982) is a former Japanese football player.

== Club statistics ==
Club performance			League		Cup		League Cup		Total	
Season	Club	League	Apps	Goals	Apps	Goals	Apps	Goals	Apps	Goals
Japan			League		Emperor's Cup		League Cup		Total	
2005	Cerezo Osaka	J1 League	3	0	0	0	2	0	5	0
2006	Cerezo Osaka	J1 League	12	0	1	0	0	0	13	0
2007	Cerezo Osaka	J2 League	40	0	0	0	-		40	0
2008	Cerezo Osaka	J2 League	28	0	0	0	-		28	0
2009	Cerezo Osaka	J2 League	32	1	1	0	-		33	1
2010	Kataller Toyama	J2 League	10	2	0	0	-		10	2
2011	Kataller Toyama	J2 League	22	0	1	0	-		23	0
2012	Sagawa Printing	Football League	13	0	-		-		13	0
2013	Sagawa Printing	Football League					-			
Career total			160	3	3	0	2	0	165	3
