= Alemão (footballer, born 1984) =

Brazilian footballer

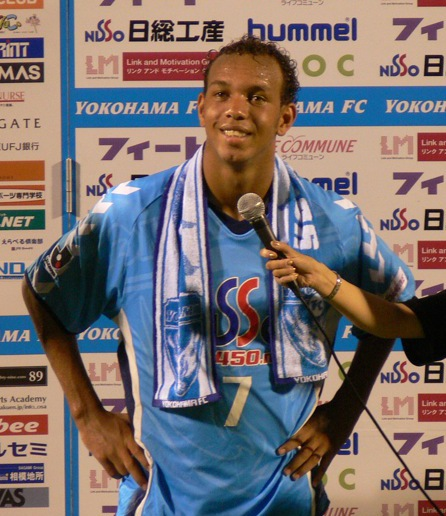

Personal information
- Full name: Carlos Adriano de Jesus Soares
- Date of birth: 10 April 1984
- Place of birth: Nova Iguaçu, Brazil
- Date of death: 8 July 2007 (aged 23)
- Height: 1.84 m (6 ft 1/2 in)
- Position: Striker

Senior career*
Years	Team	Apps	(Gls)
2004	Coritiba		
2005–2006	Kyoto Purple Sanga		
2006	Yokohama FC		
2007	Palmeiras		
- * Club domestic league appearances and goals

Carlos Adriano de Jesus Soares (10 April 1984 – 8 July 2007), better known as Alemão, was a Brazilian football player. He died in 2007 of injuries sustained in a car accident in Nova Iguaçu.

== Club statistics ==
Club performance			League		Cup		League Cup		Total	
Season	Club	League	Apps	Goals	Apps	Goals	Apps	Goals	Apps	Goals
Brazil			League		Copa do Brasil		League Cup		Total	
2004	Coritiba	Série A	28	7					28	7
Japan			League		Emperor's Cup		League Cup		Total	
2005	Kyoto Purple Sanga	J2 League	34	15	1	0	-		35	15
2006	Kyoto Purple Sanga	J1 League	10	2	0	0	5	2	15	4
2006	Yokohama FC	J2 League	24	18	0	0	-		24	18
Brazil			League		Copa do Brasil		League Cup		Total	
2007	Palmeiras	Série A	3	1					3	1
Total	Brazil		31	8					31	8
Total	Japan		68	35	1	0	5	2	74	37
Career total			99	43	1	0	5	2	105	45
