= Kazuya Iwakura =

Japanese footballer

Kazuya Iwakura 岩倉 一弥
Personal information
- Full name: Kazuya Iwakura
- Date of birth: April 26, 1985 (age 41)
- Place of birth: Toyama, Japan
- Height: 1.79 m (5 ft 10 1/2 in)
- Position: Defender

Senior career*
Years	Team	Apps	(Gls)
2004–2007	Yokohama FC	21	(0)
2008	New Wave Kitakyushu	23	(3)
2009	Tokyo Verdy	8	(0)
Total		52	(3)
- * Club domestic league appearances and goals

Kazuya Iwakura (岩倉 一弥, Iwakura Kazuya; born April 26, 1985) is a former Japanese football player.

== Career statistics ==
Appearances and goals by club, season and competition
Club	Season	League			Emperor's Cup		J.League Cup		Total	
Club	Season	Division	Apps	Goals	Apps	Goals	Apps	Goals	Apps	Goals
Yokohama FC	2004	J2 League	2	0	0	0	—		2	0
Yokohama FC	2005	J2 League	7	0	0	0	—		7	0
Yokohama FC	2006	J2 League	7	0	0	0	—		7	0
Yokohama FC	2007	J1 League	5	0	0	0	1	0	6	0
New Wave Kitakyushu	2008	Football League	23	3	1	0	—		24	3
Tokyo Verdy	2009	J2 League	8	0	0	0	—		8	0
Career total			52	3	1	0	1	0	54	3
