= Tatsumi Iida =

Japanese footballer

Personal information
- Full name: Tatsumi Iida
- Date of birth: July 22, 1985 (age 41)
- Place of birth: Zama, Kanagawa, Japan
- Height: 1.91 m (6 ft 3 in)
- Position: Goalkeeper

Youth career
- 2001–2003: Kojo High School
- 2004–2007: Jobu University

Senior career*
Years	Team	Apps	(Gls)
2008	Tochigi SC	0	(0)
2009	Yokohama FC	0	(0)
2010	Tochigi SC	0	(0)
2011–2017	Kataller Toyama	62	(0)
- * Club domestic league appearances and goals as of 2 February 2018

Tatsumi Iida (飯田 健巳, born July 22, 1985) is a former Japanese football player who last played for Kataller Toyama.

== Club statistics ==
Updated to 2 February 2018.

Appearances and goals by club, season and competition
Club	Season	League			Emperor's Cup		Total	
Club	Season	Division	Apps	Goals	Apps	Goals	Apps	Goals
Tochigi SC	2008	JFL	0	0	0	0	0	0
Yokohama FC	2009	J2 League	0	0	0	0	0	0
Tochigi SC	2010	J2 League	0	0	0	0	0	0
Kataller Toyama	2011	J2 League	17	0	1	0	18	0
Kataller Toyama	2012	J2 League	8	0	0	0	8	0
Kataller Toyama	2013	J2 League	3	0	0	0	3	0
Kataller Toyama	2014	J2 League	17	0	2	0	19	0
Kataller Toyama	2015	J3 League	13	0	-		13	0
Kataller Toyama	2016	J3 League	4	0	0	0	4	0
Kataller Toyama	2017	J3 League	0	0	0	0	0	0
Total			62	0	3	0	65	0
