= Yohei Sakai =

Japanese footballer

Yohei Sakai 坂井 洋平
Personal information
- Full name: Yohei Sakai
- Date of birth: April 10, 1986 (age 40)
- Place of birth: Yokohama, Kanagawa, Japan
- Height: 1.77 m (5 ft 9 1/2 in)
- Position: Midfielder

Youth career
- 2002–2004: Yokohama F. Marinos

Senior career*
Years	Team	Apps	(Gls)
2004	Yokohama F. Marinos	0	(0)
2005–2007	Yokohama FC	15	(0)
2008–2011	SC Sagamihara		
2012	Mito Hollyhock	6	(0)
2013–2015	Thespakusatsu Gunma	71	(1)
2016	SC Sagamihara	26	(1)
Total		118	(2)
Medal record
Yokohama F. Marinos
Winner	J1 League	2004
- * Club domestic league appearances and goals

Yohei Sakai (坂井 洋平, Sakai Yohei; born April 10, 1986) is a former Japanese football player.

== Club statistics ==
Club performance			League		Cup		League Cup		Continental		Total	
Season	Club	League	Apps	Goals	Apps	Goals	Apps	Goals	Apps	Goals	Apps	Goals
Japan			League		Emperor's Cup		J.League Cup		Asia		Total	
2004	Yokohama F. Marinos	J1 League	0	0	0	0	0	0	1	0	1	0
2005	Yokohama FC	J2 League	3	0	0	0	-		-		3	0
2006	Yokohama FC	J2 League	11	0	1	0	-		-		12	0
2007	Yokohama FC	J1 League	2	0	1	0	0	0	-		3	0
Total			16	0	2	0	0	0	1	0	19	0
