= Kazuhito Esaki =

Japanese footballer

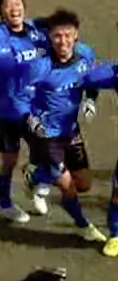

Personal information
- Full name: Kazuhito Esaki
- Date of birth: October 31, 1986 (age 40)
- Place of birth: Ibaraki, Japan
- Height: 1.80 m (5 ft 11 in)
- Position: Defender

Youth career
- 2005–2008: Hosei University

Senior career*
Years	Team	Apps	(Gls)
2009	Kataller Toyama	2	(0)
2010–2015	Blaublitz Akita	115	(4)
Total		117	(4)
- * Club domestic league appearances and goals

Kazuhito Esaki (江﨑 一仁, Esaki Kazuhito; born October 31, 1986) is a former Japanese football player.

== Club statistics ==
Club performance			League		Cup		Total	
Season	Club	League	Apps	Goals	Apps	Goals	Apps	Goals
Japan			League		Emperor's Cup		Total	
2009	Kataller Toyama	J2 League	2	0	0	0	2	0
2010	Blaublitz Akita	Football League	3	0	0	0	3	0
2011	Blaublitz Akita	Football League	15	1	0	0	15	1
2012	Blaublitz Akita	Football League	24	0	1	0	25	0
2013	Blaublitz Akita	Football League	23	1	2	0	25	1
2014	Blaublitz Akita	J3 League	24	1	2	0	26	1
2015	Blaublitz Akita	J3 League	26	1	0	0	26	1
Total			117	4	5	0	122	4
