= Yusei Kudo =

Japanese footballer

Yusei Kudo 工藤 祐生
Personal information
- Full name: Yusei Kudo
- Date of birth: April 5, 1986 (age 40)
- Place of birth: Sagamihara, Japan
- Height: 1.84 m (6 ft 1/2 in)
- Position: Defender

Team information
- Current team: Erbisa Fujisawa
- Number: 3

Youth career
- 2005–2008: Tokyo University of Agriculture

Senior career*
Years	Team	Apps	(Gls)
2009	Tochigi SC	1	(0)
2010–2018	SC Sagamihara	146	(8)
2019	Erbisa Fujisawa		
- * Club domestic league appearances and goals as of 23 February 2019

Yusei Kudo (工藤 祐生, Kudō Yūsei; born April 5, 1986) is a Japanese football player.

== Club statistics ==
Updated to 23 February 2019.

Club performance			League		Cup		Total	
Season	Club	League	Apps	Goals	Apps	Goals	Apps	Goals
Japan			League		Emperor's Cup		Total	
2009	Tochigi SC	J2 League	1	0	0	0	1	0
2010	SC Sagamihara	Kanagawa FA			-			
2011	SC Sagamihara	JRL	12	1	-		12	1
2012	SC Sagamihara	JRL	16	1	-		16	1
2013	SC Sagamihara	JFL	1	0	-		1	0
2014	SC Sagamihara	J3 League	19	2	-		19	2
2015	SC Sagamihara	J3 League	17	1	-		17	1
2016	SC Sagamihara	J3 League	28	0	-		28	0
2017	SC Sagamihara	J3 League	30	1	-		30	1
2018	SC Sagamihara	J3 League	23	2	-		23	2
Total			147	8	0	0	147	8
