= Hisahito Inaba =

Japanese footballer

Personal information
- Full name: Hisahito Inaba
- Date of birth: May 26, 1985 (age 41)
- Place of birth: Tochigi, Japan
- Height: 1.78 m (5 ft 10 in)
- Position: Forward

Youth career
- 2004–2007: Hosei University

Senior career*
Years	Team	Apps	(Gls)
2008–2009	Tochigi SC	46	(8)
2010	Tochigi Uva FC	0	(0)
Total		46	(8)
- * Club domestic league appearances and goals

Hisahito Inaba (稲葉 久人, Inaba Hisahito; born May 26, 1985) is a former Japanese football player.

== Career statistics ==
Appearances and goals by club, season and competition
Club	Season	League			Emperor's Cup		Total	
Club	Season	Division	Apps	Goals	Apps	Goals	Apps	Goals
Tochigi SC	2008	Football League	20	4	1	0	21	4
Tochigi SC	2009	J2 League	26	4	0	0	26	4
Tochigi Uva FC	2010	Football League	0	0	0	0	0	0
Career total			46	8	1	0	47	8
