= Kohei Doi =

Japanese footballer

Kohei Doi 土井 康平
Personal information
- Full name: Kohei Doi
- Date of birth: December 24, 1988 (age 37)
- Place of birth: Kobe, Japan
- Height: 1.82 m (5 ft 11 1/2 in)
- Position: Goalkeeper

Team information
- Current team: Iwate Grulla Morioka
- Number: 1

Youth career
- 2001–2006: Vissel Kobe

Senior career*
| Years | Team | Apps | (Gls) |
| 2007–2009 | Vissel Kobe | 0 | (0) |
| 2009 | → Mito Hollyhock (loan) | 0 | (0) |
| 2010–2011 | FC Imabari | 16 | (0) |
| 2012– | Iwate Grulla Morioka | 154 | (1) |
| 2015 | → Kyoto Sanga (loan) | 0 | (0) |
- * Club domestic league appearances and goals as of 23 February 2017

Kohei Doi (土井 康平, Doi Kōhei; born December 24, 1988) is a Japanese football player, who plays for Iwate Grulla Morioka as a goalkeeper.

== Career ==
Born and raised in Kobe, he never made an appearance for Vissel, despite growing in its youth ranks. After three seasons spent between Mito Hollyhock and FC Imabari, he signed for Grulla Morioka, where he played since 2012.

He made the news after scoring from his own net with a long-kick in a J3 match against Nagano Parceiro. He was sent on loan to Kyoto Sanga after little time spent on the field in 2015, but he came back to Grulla at the end of the season.

== Club statistics ==
Updated to 23 February 2020.

| Club performance | | | League | | Cup | | League Cup | | Total | |
| Season | Club | League | Apps | Goals | Apps | Goals | Apps | Goals | Apps | Goals |
| Japan | | | League | | Emperor's Cup | | J. League Cup | | Total | |
|---|---|---|---|---|---|---|---|---|---|---|
| 2007 | Vissel Kobe | J1 League | 0 | 0 | 0 | 0 | 0 | 0 | 0 | 0 |
| 2008 | Vissel Kobe | J1 League | 0 | 0 | 0 | 0 | 0 | 0 | 0 | 0 |
| 2009 | Mito Hollyhock | J2 League | 0 | 0 | – | | 0 | 0 | 0 | 0 |
| 2009 | Vissel Kobe | J1 League | 0 | 0 | 0 | 0 | 0 | 0 | 0 | 0 |
| 2010 | FC Imabari | JRL | 14 | 0 | 2 | 0 | – | | 16 | 0 |
| 2011 | FC Imabari | JRL | 12 | 0 | 1 | 0 | – | | 13 | 0 |
| 2012 | Grulla Morioka | JRL | 12 | 0 | 1 | 0 | – | | 13 | 0 |
| 2013 | Grulla Morioka | JRL | 11 | 0 | 1 | 0 | – | | 12 | 0 |
| 2014 | Grulla Morioka | J3 League | 25 | 1 | 1 | 0 | – | | 26 | 1 |
| 2015 | Grulla Morioka | J3 League | 1 | 0 | – | | – | | 1 | 0 |
| 2015 | Kyoto Sanga | J2 League | 0 | 0 | 0 | 0 | – | | 0 | 0 |
| 2016 | Grulla Morioka | J3 League | 30 | 0 | 3 | 0 | – | | 33 | 0 |
| 2017 | Grulla Morioka | J3 League | 30 | 0 | 2 | 0 | – | | 32 | 0 |
| 2018 | Grulla Morioka | J3 League | 12 | 0 | 0 | 0 | – | | 12 | 0 |
| 2019 | Grulla Morioka | J3 League | 33 | 0 | 2 | 0 | – | | 35 | 0 |
| Total | | | 233 | 11 | 14 | 2 | 2 | 0 | 249 | 13 |
