= Kento Hori =

Japanese footballer

Personal information
- Date of birth: June 13, 1982 (age 44)
- Place of birth: Hiroshima, Japan
- Height: 1.76 m (5 ft 9 1/2 in)
- Position: Midfielder

Youth career
- 2001–2004: Juntendo University

Senior career*
| Years | Team | Apps | (Gls) |
| 2005–2007 | Sagawa Express | 92 | (36) |
| 2008–2009 | Mito HollyHock | 49 | (6) |
| 2010–2013 | Hoyo Oita | 41 | (40) |
| Total | | 182 | (82) |
- * Club domestic league appearances and goals

Kento Hori (堀 健人, Hori Kento; born June 13, 1982) is a former Japanese football player.

== Career statistics ==
Appearances and goals by club, season and competition
| Club | Season | League | | | Emperor's Cup | | Total | |
| Club | Season | Division | Apps | Goals | Apps | Goals | Apps | Goals |
|---|---|---|---|---|---|---|---|---|
| Mito HollyHock | 2008 | J2 League | 35 | 5 | 2 | 0 | 37 | 5 |
| Mito HollyHock | 2009 | J2 League | 14 | 1 | 0 | 0 | 14 | 1 |
| Career total | | | 49 | 6 | 2 | 0 | 51 | 6 |
