= Hiromasa Kanazawa =

Japanese footballer (born 1983)

Personal information
- Date of birth: December 1, 1983 (age 42)
- Place of birth: Shizuoka, Japan
- Height: 1.70 m (5 ft 7 in)
- Position: Midfielder

Youth career
- 2002–2005: Tokyo Gakugei University

Senior career*
Years	Team	Apps	(Gls)
2006	Yokohama FC	1	(0)
2007–2009	Mito HollyHock	99	(2)
2010–2011	SC Sagamihara		
Total		100	(2)
- * Club domestic league appearances and goals

Hiromasa Kanazawa (金澤 大将, Kanazawa Hiromasa; born December 1, 1983) is a former Japanese football player.

== Club statistics ==
Club performance			League		Cup		Total	
Season	Club	League	Apps	Goals	Apps	Goals	Apps	Goals
Japan			League		Emperor's Cup		Total	
2006	Yokohama FC	J2 League	1	0	0	0	1	0
2007	Mito HollyHock	J2 League	46	2	2	0	48	2
2008	Mito HollyHock	J2 League	28	0	2	0	30	0
2009	Mito HollyHock	J2 League	25	0	0	0	25	0
Country	Japan		100	2	4	0	104	2
Total			100	2	4	0	104	2
