= Takuo Ōkubo =

Japanese footballer

Takuo Ōkubo 大久保 択生
Personal information
- Date of birth: 18 September 1989 (age 37)
- Place of birth: Koto, Tokyo, Japan
- Height: 1.90 m (6 ft 3 in)
- Position: Goalkeeper

Team information
- Current team: Kataller Toyama (on loan from Iwate Grulla Morioka)
- Number: 21

Youth career
- 2005–2007: Teikyo High School

Senior career*
Years	Team	Apps	(Gls)
2008–2010	Yokohama FC	40	(0)
2011–2013	JEF United Chiba	0	(0)
2014–2016	V-Varen Nagasaki	96	(0)
2017–2018	FC Tokyo	10	(0)
2017–2018	→ FC Tokyo U-23 (loan)	6	(0)
2019	Sagan Tosu	10	(0)
2019–2023	Shimizu S-Pulse	26	(0)
2024–	Iwate Grulla Morioka	34	(0)
2025–	→ Kataller Toyama (loan)	0	(0)
- * Club domestic league appearances and goals as of 8 February 2025, 23:22 (UTC)

Takuo Ōkubo (大久保 択生, Ōkubo Takuo; born September 18, 1989 in Tokyo) is a Japanese football player who play as a Goalkeeper and currently play for J2 League club, Kataller Toyama, on loan from Iwate Grulla Morioka.

== Career ==
On 3 January 2024, J3 club, Iwate Grulla Morioka announced the signing of Ōkubo.

On 29 December 2024, Ōkubo was announce official loan transfer to J2 promoted club, Kataller Toyama from 2025 season.

== Career statistics ==
=== Club ===
As of the start for 2025 season.

Club	Season	League			Emperor's Cup		J. League Cup		Total	
Club	Season	Division	Apps	Goals	Apps	Goals	Apps	Goals	Apps	Goals
Yokohama FC	2008	J.League Div 2	0	0	0	0	–		0	0
Yokohama FC	2009	J.League Div 2	33	0	2	0	–		35	0
Yokohama FC	2010	J.League Div 2	7	0	0	0	–		7	0
JEF United Chiba	2011	J.League Div 2	0	0	1	0	–		1	0
JEF United Chiba	2012	J.League Div 2	0	0	1	0	–		1	0
JEF United Chiba	2013	J.League Div 2	0	0	1	0	–		1	0
V-Varen Nagasaki	2014	J.League Div 2	23	0	2	0	–		25	0
V-Varen Nagasaki	2015	J2 League	31	0	1	0	–		32	0
V-Varen Nagasaki	2016	J2 League	42	0	1	0	–		43	0
FC Tokyo	2017	J1 League	7	0	1	0	2	0	10	0
FC Tokyo U-23	2017	J3 League	4	0	–		–		4	0
FC Tokyo	2018	J1 League	3	0	1	0	3	0	7	0
FC Tokyo U-23	2018	J3 League	6	0	–		–		6	0
Sagan Tosu	2019	J1 League	10	0	1	0	0	0	11	0
Shimizu S-Pulse	2019	J1 League	11	0	0	0	0	0	11	0
Shimizu S-Pulse	2020	J1 League	15	0	0	0	1	0	16	0
Shimizu S-Pulse	2021	J1 League	0	0	0	0	0	0	0	0
Shimizu S-Pulse	2022	J1 League	2	0	0	0	5	0	7	0
Shimizu S-Pulse	2023	J2 League	0	0	1	0	6	0	7	0
Iwate Grulla Morioka	2024	J3 League	34	0	0	0	1	0	35	0
Kataller Toyama (loan)	2025	J2 League	0	0	0	0	0	0	0	0
Career total			218	0	13	0	18	0	249	0
