= 2006 J.League Division 2 =

J.League Division 2
- Season: 2006
- Champions: Yokohama FC; 1st J2 title 1st D2 title
- Promoted: Yokohama FC; Kashiwa Reysol; Vissel Kobe
- Matches: 312
- Goals: 833 (2.67 per match)
- Top goalscorer: Borges (26 goals total)
- Highest attendance: 18,648 (Round 14, Vegalta vs. Bellmare)
- Lowest attendance: 1,019 (Round 23, HollyHock vs. Thespa)
- Average attendance: 6,406

The 2006 J. League Division 2 season was the 35th season of the second-tier club football in Japan and the 8th season since the establishment of J2 League.

In this season, number of participating clubs became thirteen, increased by one from the previous season. The clubs competed in the quadruple round-robin format for the top two promotion slots. Farther, the third-placed finisher participated in the Pro/Rele Series for the promotion. There were no relegation to the third-tier Japan Football League.

== General ==
=== Promotion and relegation ===
- At the end of the 2005 season, Kyoto Purple Sanga, Avispa Fukuoka, and Ventforet Kofu were promoted to J1
- At the end of the 2005 season, Kashiwa Reysol, Tokyo Verdy 1969, and Vissel Kobe were relegated to J2.
- At the end of the 2005 season, Ehime FC was promoted to J2.

=== Changes in competition format ===
- Number of participating clubs increased to 13 games
- Each clubs will play 48 games instead 44 games

=== Changes in clubs ===
none

== Clubs ==
Locations of the 2006 J.League 2 teams

Following thirteen clubs played in J. League Division 2 during 2006 season. Of these clubs, Kashiwa Reysol, Tokyo Verdy 1969, and Vissel Kobe relegated from J1 last year. Also, Ehime F.C. newly joined the J. League Division 2 from Japan Football League.

- Consadole Sapporo
- Vegalta Sendai
- Montedio Yamagata
- Mito HollyHocks
- Thespa Kusatsu
- Kashiwa Reysol
- Tokyo Verdy 1969
- Yokohama F.C.
- Shonan Bellmare
- Vissel Kobe
- Tokushima Vortis
- Ehime F.C.
- Sagan Tosu

== League format ==
Thirteen clubs played in quadruple round-robin format, a total of 48 games each. A club receives 3 points for a win, 1 point for a tie, and 0 points for a loss. The clubs are ranked by points, and tie breakers are, in the following order:

- Goal differential
- Goals scored
- Head-to-head results

A draw would be conducted, if necessary. However, if two clubs are tied at the first place, both clubs will be declared as the champions. The top two clubs will be promoted to J1, while the 3rd placed club plays a two-legged Promotion/relegation series.

== Schedule ==
The tournament ran from March 4 to December 2. With 13 teams, one team always had a bye each matchday, stretching the schedule over 52 weeks. Unlike J1, it continued uninterrupted during the World Cup in Germany.

== Final league table ==
Pos	Team	Pld	W	D	L	GF	GA	GD	Pts	Promotion
1	Yokohama FC (C, P)	48	26	15	7	61	32	+29	93	Promotion to 2007 J. League Division 1
2	Kashiwa Reysol (P)	48	27	7	14	84	60	+24	88	Promotion to 2007 J. League Division 1
3	Vissel Kobe (P)	48	25	11	12	78	53	+25	86	Promotion to 2007 J. League Division 1
4	Sagan Tosu	48	22	13	13	64	49	+15	79	
5	Vegalta Sendai	48	21	14	13	75	43	+32	77	
6	Consadole Sapporo	48	20	12	16	77	67	+10	72	
7	Tokyo Verdy 1969	48	21	8	19	69	75	−6	71	
8	Montedio Yamagata	48	17	14	17	68	57	+11	65	
9	Ehime FC	48	14	11	23	51	63	−12	53	
10	Mito HollyHock	48	14	9	25	48	69	−21	51	
11	Shonan Bellmare	48	13	10	25	61	87	−26	49	
12	Thespa Kusatsu	48	9	15	24	54	86	−32	42	
13	Tokushima Vortis	48	8	11	29	43	92	−49	35	

Updated to match(es) played on December 2, 2006. Source: J. League Division 2
Rules for classification: 1) points; 2) goal difference; 3) number of goals scored.
(C) Champions; (P) Promoted

== Final results ==
Rounds 1 & 2
Home \ Away	YFC	REY	VIS	SAG	VEG	CON	VER	MON	EHI	HOL	BEL	SPA	VOR
Yokohama FC		2–0	2–1	0–0	0–0	1–2	0–0	1–0	2–0	2–0	2–0	1–0	1–0
Kashiwa Reysol	2–1		0–1	2–0	2–1	2–1	4–1	1–3	1–0	1–1	1–1	2–1	4–0
Vissel Kobe	0–0	1–1		0–0	0–1	1–2	3–1	4–2	1–0	4–0	1–0	0–3	3–0
Sagan Tosu	0–0	2–2	1–3		1–5	0–1	1–2	2–0	4–1	0–0	2–0	2–1	2–1
Vegalta Sendai	0–0	0–1	0–0	3–0		0–2	3–0	1–1	3–1	4–1	2–2	5–1	1–0
Consadole Sapporo	0–1	1–2	1–6	2–2	1–1		4–0	2–2	3–1	0–1	4–1	3–0	4–2
Tokyo Verdy 1969	0–2	2–3	0–2	1–1	2–0	2–0		0–1	1–0	0–1	2–0	3–2	4–1
Montedio Yamagata	1–2	3–0	0–0	1–1	0–3	0–1	2–3		2–2	3–0	2–1	2–1	2–1
Ehime FC	1–0	0–1	0–2	1–2	1–2	2–1	0–0	0–2		1–1	1–2	0–0	1–0
Mito HollyHock	1–0	0–1	1–3	0–0	0–2	3–1	0–1	1–1	0–1		3–0	2–1	2–1
Shonan Bellmare	0–2	1–2	2–0	0–1	1–0	2–1	2–0	1–1	1–3	1–3		4–3	5–0
Thespa Kusatsu	0–0	0–4	3–2	3–4	0–0	2–2	0–4	3–1	2–1	1–0	2–2		0–2
Tokushima Vortis	1–1	1–0	3–0	0–0	0–4	0–0	2–0	1–4	0–2	0–0	1–1	2–1	

Updated to match(es) played on July 8, 2006. Source: J. League Division 2
Legend: Blue = home team win; Yellow = draw; Red = away team win.

Rounds 3 & 4
Home \ Away	YFC	REY	VIS	SAG	VEG	CON	VER	MON	EHI	HOL	BEL	SPA	VOR
Yokohama FC		1–0	0–1	1–0	3–1	3–0	1–2	2–1	2–0	3–2	1–1	0–2	0–0
Kashiwa Reysol	3–3		3–0	2–5	2–1	2–3	4–1	2–1	3–1	3–1	4–0	2–0	2–1
Vissel Kobe	1–2	3–4		2–0	1–0	1–1	2–1	1–0	1–0	2–0	2–2	3–2	4–1
Sagan Tosu	0–1	2–1	0–1		1–0	4–0	2–0	1–2	0–0	1–0	2–1	0–1	2–0
Vegalta Sendai	1–1	2–0	2–1	0–1		0–0	1–2	0–0	1–1	3–1	4–2	5–2	1–1
Consadole Sapporo	1–2	2–1	1–4	0–2	3–1		2–0	1–1	1–1	3–1	1–5	2–2	6–0
Tokyo Verdy 1969	1–1	4–1	5–2	3–2	1–1	1–2		1–0	1–4	1–4	3–1	1–1	4–2
Montedio Yamagata	2–3	1–0	1–1	1–3	1–0	0–0	0–1		2–0	5–1	1–1	3–0	2–1
Ehime FC	2–2	3–1	0–0	0–2	1–2	1–0	1–2	2–2		0–1	1–2	1–0	3–3
Mito HollyHock	1–2	0–1	1–2	2–2	0–0	0–1	1–2	2–0	0–1		3–2	1–1	2–0
Shonan Bellmare	0–1	0–3	2–2	1–2	0–3	1–6	3–0	1–0	0–2	1–0		2–1	2–4
Thespa Kusatsu	1–1	1–1	1–1	0–0	0–2	0–2	1–1	1–1	2–5	3–1	0–0		1–0
Tokushima Vortis	0–2	0–0	1–2	1–2	1–3	0–0	2–2	0–5	0–1	1–2	2–1	3–1	

Updated to match(es) played on December 2, 2006. Source: J. League Division 2
Legend: Blue = home team win; Yellow = draw; Red = away team win.

== Top scorers ==
Pos	Scorer	Club	Goals
1	(Brazil) Borges	Vegalta Sendai	26
2	(Brazil) Hulk	Consadole Sapporo	25
3	(Japan) Tatsunori Arai	Sagan Tosu	23
3	(Brazil) Leandro	Montedio Yamagata	23
5	(Brazil) Diego	Kashiwa Reysol	21
6	(Brazil) Alemão	Yokohama FC	18
7	(Brazil) Anderson	Mito HollyHock	17
8	(Japan) Kazuki Hiramoto	Tokyo Verdy 1969	15
8	(Japan) Atsuhiro Miura	Vissel Kobe	15
10	(Brazil) Lopes	Vegalta Sendai	14
10	(Japan) Toshiya Tanaka	Ehime FC	14

== Attendance ==
Pos	Team	Total	High	Low	Average	Change
1	Vegalta Sendai	346,868	18,648	10,529	14,453	−9.3%
2	Consadole Sapporo	251,476	18,547	3,896	10,478	−5.9%
3	Kashiwa Reysol	199,872	11,471	4,464	8,328	−33.3%^{†}
4	Sagan Tosu	179,151	18,231	4,121	7,465	−5.0%
5	Vissel Kobe	165,834	15,407	3,750	6,910	−53.7%^{†}
6	Tokyo Verdy 1969	136,926	11,176	2,982	5,705	−61.2%^{†}
7	Shonan Bellmare	128,766	10,723	2,551	5,365	−6.6%
8	Yokohama FC	122,852	11,472	2,690	5,119	−13.8%
9	Montedio Yamagata	122,042	13,043	2,236	5,085	−14.5%
10	Ehime FC	99,334	10,922	2,091	4,139	+45.5%^{‡}
11	Thespa Kusatsu	89,670	6,355	1,608	3,736	−5.6%
12	Tokushima Vortis	83,452	6,970	1,257	3,477	−20.4%
13	Mito HollyHock	72,405	9,482	1,019	3,017	−9.5%
	League total	1,998,648	18,648	1,019	6,406	−14.4%

Updated to games played on December 2, 2006
Source: J. League Division 2
Notes:
^{†} Team played previous season in J1.
^{‡} Team played previous season in JFL.
