= List of Japanese football transfers winter 2014–15 =

This is a list of Japanese football transfers in the winter transfer window 2014–2015 by club.

== J. League Division 1 ==
=== Gamba Osaka ===
In: Note: Flags indicate national team as defined under FIFA eligibility rules; some limited exceptions apply. Players may hold more than one non-FIFA nationality.

No.	Pos.	Nation	Player
19	GK	Japan	Yōsuke Fujigaya (from Jubilo Iwata)
24	FW	Japan	Shingo Akamine (from Vegalta Sendai)
26	MF	Japan	Naoya Seno (promoted from youth team)
28	MF	Japan	Shota Yomesaka (promoted from youth team)
30	FW	Japan	Sou Hirao (promoted from youth team)
31	GK	Japan	Mizuki Hayashi (promoted from youth team)
33	MF	Japan	Shohei Ogura (from Yokohama Marinos)

Out: Note: Flags indicate national team as defined under FIFA eligibility rules; some limited exceptions apply. Players may hold more than one non-FIFA nationality.

No.	Pos.	Nation	Player
—	GK	Japan	Atsushi Kimura (retired)
—	GK	Japan	Kohei Kawata (to Ventforet Kofu)
—	DF	Japan	Keigo Numata (to Kamatamare Sanuki)
—	DF	Japan	Yuto Uchida (loan to Tokushima Vortis)
—	DF	Japan	Katsuhisa Inamori (to Gainare Tottori)
—	MF	Japan	Kenya Okazaki (loan to Ehime FC)
—	MF	Japan	Naoki Ogawa (loan to Fujieda MYFC)
—	FW	Japan	Akihiro Sato (to Tokushima Vortis)
—	FW	Japan	Shota Kawanishi (to Montedio Yamagata, previously on loan)

=== Urawa Red Diamonds ===
In: Note: Flags indicate national team as defined under FIFA eligibility rules; some limited exceptions apply. Players may hold more than one non-FIFA nationality.

No.	Pos.	Nation	Player
2	DF	Japan	Kenichi Kaga (from FC Tokyo)
11	FW	Japan	Naoki Ishihara (from Sanfrecce Hiroshima)
15	GK	Japan	Koki Otani (end of loan, return from Giravanz Kitakyushu)
18	MF	Japan	Shuto Kojima (end of loan, return from Tokushima Vortis)
19	FW	Japan	Yuki Muto (from Vegalta Sendai)
21	FW	Slovenia	Zlatan Ljubijankić (from Omiya Ardija)
25	MF	Japan	Shota Saito (promoted from youth ranks)
27	DF	Japan	Rikiya Motegi (promoted from youth ranks)
31	FW	Japan	Toshiyuki Takagi (from Shimizu S-Pulse)
33	DF	Japan	Wataru Hashimoto (from Kashiwa Reysol)
36	DF	Japan	Takuya Okamoto (end of loan, return from V-Varen Nagasaki)

Out: Note: Flags indicate national team as defined under FIFA eligibility rules; some limited exceptions apply. Players may hold more than one non-FIFA nationality.

No.	Pos.	Nation	Player
—	GK	Japan	Nobuhiro Kato (to Omiya Ardija)
—	GK	Japan	Norihiro Yamagishi (to Montedio Yamagata, previously on loan)
—	DF	Japan	Keisuke Tsuboi (to Shonan Bellmare)
—	DF	Japan	Mizuki Hamada (to Avispa Fukuoka)
—	MF	Japan	Masaya Nozaki (to Gainare Tottori, previously on loan to Avispa Fukuoka)
—	MF	Japan	Kunimitsu Sekiguchi (to Cerezo Osaka)
—	MF	Brazil	Marcio Richardes (end of contract)
—	MF	Japan	Naoki Yamada (loan to Shonan Bellmare)
—	MF	Japan	Shinya Yajima (loan to Fagiano Okayama)
—	FW	Japan	Toyofumi Sakano (loan to Tochigi SC)
—	FW	Japan	Takahiro Kunimoto (to Avispa Fukuoka)

=== Kashima Antlers ===
In: Note: Flags indicate national team as defined under FIFA eligibility rules; some limited exceptions apply. Players may hold more than one non-FIFA nationality.

No.	Pos.	Nation	Player
14	DF	South Korea	Hwang Seok-ho (from Sanfrecce Hiroshima)
15	FW	Japan	Hiroyuki Takasaki (from Tokushima Vortis)
17	DF	Japan	Ryuga Suzuki (returned from loan to Tochigi SC)
26	MF	Japan	Kazune Kubota (from Osaka Toin High School)
30	MF	Japan	Hisashi Ohashi (promoted from youth team)
33	MF	Japan	Mu Kanazaki (on loan from Portimonense)
34	FW	Japan	Yuma Suzuki (promoted from youth team)

Out: Note: Flags indicate national team as defined under FIFA eligibility rules; some limited exceptions apply. Players may hold more than one non-FIFA nationality.

No.	Pos.	Nation	Player
—	DF	Japan	Koji Nakata (retired)
—	DF	Japan	Takanori Maeno (to Albirex Niigata)
—	MF	Brazil	Luiz Alberto (end of contract)
—	MF	Japan	Ryuta Miyauchi (end of contract)
—	MF	Brazil	Jorge Wagner (to Vitória)
—	FW	Japan	Dinei (end of contract)

=== Kashiwa Reysol ===
In: Note: Flags indicate national team as defined under FIFA eligibility rules; some limited exceptions apply. Players may hold more than one non-FIFA nationality.

No.	Pos.	Nation	Player
6	DF	Japan	Ryosuke Yamanaka (return from loan to JEF United Chiba)
10	MF	Japan	Yūki Ōtsu (from VVV Venlo)
15	MF	Japan	Kosuke Taketomi (return from loan to Shonan Bellmare)
19	MF	Japan	Hiroto Nakagawa (return from loan to Shonan Bellmare)
29	DF	Japan	Yuta Nakayama (promoted from youth team)
30	FW	Brazil	Cristiano (on loan from Ventforet Kofu)
31	FW	Japan	Koki Oshima (promoted from youth team)
—	GK	Japan	Ryuki Miura (from Meiji University)

Out: Note: Flags indicate national team as defined under FIFA eligibility rules; some limited exceptions apply. Players may hold more than one non-FIFA nationality.

No.	Pos.	Nation	Player
—	GK	Japan	Kosuke Nakamura (loan to Avispa Fukuoka)
—	DF	Japan	Wataru Hashimoto (to Urawa Red Diamonds)
—	DF	Japan	Hirofumi Watanabe (to Vegalta Sendai)
—	MF	Japan	Hiroyuki Taniguchi (to Sagan Tosu, previously on loan)
—	MF	Japan	Kaoru Takayama (to Shonan Bellmare)
—	MF	Brazil	Dudu (end of loan, return to Figueirense FC)
—	FW	Japan	Yu Kimura (loan to V-Varen Nagasaki)

=== Sagan Tosu ===
In: Note: Flags indicate national team as defined under FIFA eligibility rules; some limited exceptions apply. Players may hold more than one non-FIFA nationality.

No.	Pos.	Nation	Player
9	MF	South Korea	Baek Sung-Dong (from Jubilo Iwata)
19	FW	Japan	Ryogo Yamazaki (from Fukuoka University)
20	MF	Japan	Minoru Suganuma (from Jubilo Iwata)
23	DF	Japan	Yutaka Yoshida (from Shimizu S-Pulse)
24	MF	Japan	Daichi Kamata (from Higashiyama High School)
27	DF	Japan	Shuhei Sasahara (from Shugakukan High School)
29	MF	Japan	Hiroyuki Taniguchi (from Kashiwa Reysol, previously on loan)
30	MF	Japan	Akito Fukuta (from NIFS Kanoya)
31	FW	Japan	Ryosuke Tamura (on loan from Kyoto Sanga)

Out: Note: Flags indicate national team as defined under FIFA eligibility rules; some limited exceptions apply. Players may hold more than one non-FIFA nationality.

No.	Pos.	Nation	Player
—	DF	Japan	Michihiro Yasuda (to Vissel Kobe)
—	DF	Japan	Shohei Kishida (loan to V-Varen Nagasaki)
—	DF	Japan	Takashi Kanai (to JEF United Chiba)
—	DF	Japan	Tatsuya Sakai (loan to Matsumoto Yamaga)
—	MF	Colombia	Jonathan Restrepo (end of contract, previously on loan to Oita Trinita)
—	MF	Japan	Kohei Kuroki (to Roasso Kumamoto, previously on loan)
—	MF	Japan	Toshiya Sueyoshi (loan to Avispa Fukuoka, previously on loan to Oita Trinita)
—	FW	Japan	Ryuji Bando (to Omiya Ardija)

=== Kawasaki Frontale ===
In: Note: Flags indicate national team as defined under FIFA eligibility rules; some limited exceptions apply. Players may hold more than one non-FIFA nationality.

No.	Pos.	Nation	Player
1	GK	Japan	Kenya Matsui (on loan from Tokushima Vortis)
3	DF	Japan	Makoto Kakuda (from Vegalta Sendai)
7	DF	Japan	Koji Hashimoto (from Omiya Ardija)
9	FW	Japan	Kenyu Sugimoto (from Cerezo Osaka)
15	FW	Japan	Takayuki Funayama (from Matsumoto Yamaga)
18	DF	Brazil	Elsinho (on loan from Tombense)
20	DF	Japan	Shintaro Kurayama (from University of Tsukuba)
22	MF	Japan	Yoshihiro Nakano (from University of Tsukuba)
26	MF	Japan	Koji Miyoshi (promoted from youth ranks)
28	MF	Japan	Ko Itakura (promoted from youth ranks)

Out: Note: Flags indicate national team as defined under FIFA eligibility rules; some limited exceptions apply. Players may hold more than one non-FIFA nationality.

No.	Pos.	Nation	Player
—	GK	Japan	Rikihiro Sugiyama (to Shimizu S-Pulse)
—	DF	Japan	Akito Fukumori (loan to Consadole Sapporo)
—	DF	Japan	Yusuke Tanaka (to Western Sydney Wanderers)
—	DF	Brazil	Jeci (to Avai, previously on loan from Coritiba)
—	DF	Japan	Sota Nakazawa (loan to Cerezo Osaka)
—	MF	Japan	Junichi Inamoto (to Consadole Sapporo)
—	MF	Brazil	Paulinho (end of loan, return to Tochigi SC)
—	MF	Japan	Jun Kanakubo (end of loan, return to Omiya Ardija)
—	MF	Japan	Masataka Kani (loan to Shonan Bellmare)
—	FW	Japan	Yasuhito Morishima (loan to Jubilo Iwata)

=== Yokohama F. Marinos ===
In: Note: Flags indicate national team as defined under FIFA eligibility rules; some limited exceptions apply. Players may hold more than one non-FIFA nationality.

No.	Pos.	Nation	Player
2	DF	Japan	Takashi Amano (returned from loan to JEF United Chiba)
14	MF	Japan	Andrew Kumagai (returned from loan to Shonan Bellmare)
15	DF	Japan	Yusuke Higa (returned from loan to Kyoto Sanga)
19	FW	Japan	Teruhito Nakagawa (from Senshu University)
26	MF	Japan	Kensei Nakashima (from Higashi Fukuoka High School)
30	GK	Japan	Junto Taguchi (promoted from youth team)
39	FW	Brazil	Ademilson (on loan from São Paulo)

Out: Note: Flags indicate national team as defined under FIFA eligibility rules; some limited exceptions apply. Players may hold more than one non-FIFA nationality.

No.	Pos.	Nation	Player
—	GK	Japan	Yuji Rokutan (to Vegalta Sendai)
—	DF	Japan	Eijiro Takeda (to Shonan Bellmare, previously on loan to Avispa Fukuoka)
—	MF	Japan	Shohei Ogura (to Gamba Osaka)
—	MF	Japan	Rei Matsumoto (to Oita Trinita, previously on loan)
—	MF	Japan	Sho Matsumoto (loan to Renofa Yamaguchi)
—	FW	Japan	Yoshihiro Fujita (to Shonan Bellmare)

=== Sanfrecce Hiroshima ===
In: Note: Flags indicate national team as defined under FIFA eligibility rules; some limited exceptions apply. Players may hold more than one non-FIFA nationality.

No.	Pos.	Nation	Player
9	FW	Brazil	Douglas (on loan from Tokushima Vortis)
15	MF	Japan	Kohei Kudo (from Kyoto Sanga)
19	DF	Japan	Sho Sasaki (from Ventforet Kofu)
21	GK	Japan	Ryotaro Hironaga (from FC Tokyo, previously on loan to Kataller Toyama)
26	DF	Japan	Yasumasa Kawasaki (from Ryutsu Keizai University)
—	DF	Japan	Hironori Ishikawa (end of loan, return from Vegalta Sendai)

Out: Note: Flags indicate national team as defined under FIFA eligibility rules; some limited exceptions apply. Players may hold more than one non-FIFA nationality.

No.	Pos.	Nation	Player
—	GK	Japan	Yutaro Hara (to Roasso Kumamoto)
—	DF	Japan	Hironori Ishikawa (loan to Oita Trinita, previously loan to Vegalta Sendai)
—	DF	South Korea	Hwang Seok-ho (to Kashima Antlers)
—	DF	South Korea	Park Hyung-jin (loan to Tochigi SC)
—	DF	Japan	Naoki Otani (loan to Roasso Kumamoto)
—	MF	Japan	Hayao Kawabe (loan to Jubilo Iwata)
—	MF	South Korea	Kim Jeong-seok (loan to Renofa Yamaguchi, previously loan to Roasso Kumamoto)
—	MF	South Korea	Lee Dae-heon (loan to Tochigi SC, previously loan to V-Varen Nagasaki)
—	FW	Japan	Naoki Ishihara (to Urawa Red Diamonds)
—	FW	Japan	Sena Inami (loan to Jubilo Iwata, previously loan to V-Varen Nagasaki)

=== F.C. Tokyo ===
In: Note: Flags indicate national team as defined under FIFA eligibility rules; some limited exceptions apply. Players may hold more than one non-FIFA nationality.

No.	Pos.	Nation	Player
5	DF	Japan	Yuichi Maruyama (returned from loan to Shonan Bellmare)
13	GK	Japan	Tatsuya Enomoto (from Tochigi SC)
20	FW	Japan	Ryoichi Maeda (from Jubilo Iwata)
23	FW	Japan	Yohei Hayashi (returned from loan to Oita Trinita)
24	MF	Japan	Wataru Sasaki (promoted from youth team)
25	DF	Japan	Ryota Ogawa (from Ryutsu Keizai University)
27	MF	Japan	Shuto Kono (returned from loan to JEF United Chiba)
33	DF	Japan	Tatsuki Nara (in loan from Consadole Sapporo)
37	MF	Japan	Kento Hashimoto (returned from loan to Roasso Kumamoto)

Out: Note: Flags indicate national team as defined under FIFA eligibility rules; some limited exceptions apply. Players may hold more than one non-FIFA nationality.

No.	Pos.	Nation	Player
—	GK	Japan	Hitoshi Shiota (to Omiya Ardija)
—	GK	Japan	Ryotaro Hironaga (to Sanfrecce Hiroshima, previously on loan to Kataller Toyama)
—	DF	Japan	Kenta Mukuhara (to Cerezo Osaka)
—	DF	Japan	Kenichi Kaga (to Urawa Reds)
—	FW	Brazil	Edu (to Jeonbuk Hyundai Motors)
—	FW	Japan	Kazuma Watanabe (to Vissel Kobe)

=== Nagoya Grampus ===
In: Note: Flags indicate national team as defined under FIFA eligibility rules; some limited exceptions apply. Players may hold more than one non-FIFA nationality.

No.	Pos.	Nation	Player
2	DF	Japan	Akira Takeuchi (from JEF United Chiba)
5	DF	Japan	Shun Obu (from Fukuoka University)
11	FW	Japan	Kensuke Nagai (from Standard Liège, previously on loan)
18	FW	Slovenia	Milivoje Novakovič (from Shimizu S-Pulse)
35	MF	Japan	Teruki Tanaka (end of loan, return from Oita Trinita)

Out: Note: Flags indicate national team as defined under FIFA eligibility rules; some limited exceptions apply. Players may hold more than one non-FIFA nationality.

No.	Pos.	Nation	Player
—	MF	Japan	Naoshi Nakamura (retired)
—	MF	Japan	Régis (end of loan, return to Atlético Goianiense)
—	MF	Japan	Ryosuke Tone (loan to V-Varen Nagasaki)
—	MF	Japan	Taisuke Mizuno (to FC Gifu, previously on loan)
—	MF	Japan	Makito Yoshida (to Mito Hollyhock, previously on loan)
—	FW	Australia	Joshua Kennedy (to Melbourne City)
—	FW	Japan	Keiji Tamada (to Cerezo Osaka)
—	FW	Brazil	Tiago (end of contract, previously on loan to FC Gifu)

=== Vissel Kobe ===
In: Note: Flags indicate national team as defined under FIFA eligibility rules; some limited exceptions apply. Players may hold more than one non-FIFA nationality.

No.	Pos.	Nation	Player
8	DF	Japan	Shohei Takahashi (from Omiya Ardija)
17	FW	Japan	Hideo Tanaka (returned from loan to Kyoto Sanga)
19	FW	Japan	Kazuma Watanabe (from FC Tokyo)
21	GK	Japan	Koki Mizusawa (from Waseda University)
24	MF	Japan	Masatoshi Mihara (returned from loan to V-Varen Nagasaki)
26	DF	Japan	Shinji Yamaguchi (promoted from youth team)
27	MF	Brazil	Ferrugem (on loan from Ponte Preta, previously on loan to Corinthians)
31	DF	Japan	Michihiro Yasuda (from Sagan Tosu)
34	DF	Brazil	Bueno (on loan from Shimizu S-Pulse)

Out: Note: Flags indicate national team as defined under FIFA eligibility rules; some limited exceptions apply. Players may hold more than one non-FIFA nationality.

No.	Pos.	Nation	Player
—	GK	Japan	Yuki Uekusa (to V-Varen Nagasaki, previously on loan)
—	DF	South Korea	Gang Yoon-goo (loan to Ehime FC, previously on loan to Oita Trinita)
—	DF	Japan	Hiroto Mogi (to Fukushima United)
—	DF	Japan	Hiroyuki Komoto (to Omiya Ardija)
—	MF	Brazil	Fabio Simplicio (end of contract)
—	MF	Japan	Hideo Hashimoto (to Cerezo Osaka)
—	MF	Japan	Issei Takayanagi (to Roasso Kumamoto, previously on loan)
—	MF	Colombia	Estiven (to Tokushima Vortis, previously on loan)
—	MF	Japan	Tsubasa Oya (to Omiya Ardija)
—	MF	Japan	Kyohei Sugiura (to Vegalta Sendai)
—	MF	Japan	Takuma Edamura (loan terminated, returned to Shimizu S-Pulse)
—	FW	Japan	Koki Arita (to Kyoto Sanga, previously on loan)
—	FW	Japan	Ryo Matsumura (loan to Tochigi SC)
—	FW	Japan	Yuzo Tashiro (end of contract)

=== Albirex Niigata ===
In: Note: Flags indicate national team as defined under FIFA eligibility rules; some limited exceptions apply. Players may hold more than one non-FIFA nationality.

No.	Pos.	Nation	Player
5	DF	Japan	Takanori Maeno (from Kashima Antlers)
7	DF	Brazil	Bruno Cortes (loan from São Paulo)
9	FW	Japan	Ryohei Yamazaki (from Jubilo Iwata)
22	GK	Japan	Goro Kawanami (from Tokushima Vortis)
27	DF	Japan	Ken Matsubara (from Oita Trinita, previously on loan)
34	FW	Japan	Shu Hiramatsu (from Kokushikan University)

Out: Note: Flags indicate national team as defined under FIFA eligibility rules; some limited exceptions apply. Players may hold more than one non-FIFA nationality.

No.	Pos.	Nation	Player
—	GK	Japan	Yasuhiro Watanabe (transferred to Tokushima Vortis)
—	DF	South Korea	Lee Myung-jae (end of loan, returns to Ulsan Hyundai)
—	DF	Japan	Shusuke Tsubouchi (to Jùbilo Iwata)
—	MF	Japan	Shigeto Masuda (loan to Machida Zelvia, previously on loan to Oita Trinita)
—	MF	Japan	Isao Honma (to Tochigi S.C.)
—	MF	Japan	Atomu Tanaka (to HJK Helsinki)
—	MF	Japan	Fumiya Kogure (to Albirex Niigata Singapore, previously on loan to Azul Claro Numazu)
—	MF	Japan	Seiya Fujita (to Shonan Bellmare, previously on loan)
—	FW	Japan	Hideya Okamoto (to Oita Trinita)

=== Ventforet Kofu ===
In: Note: Flags indicate national team as defined under FIFA eligibility rules; some limited exceptions apply. Players may hold more than one non-FIFA nationality.

No.	Pos.	Nation	Player
—	GK	Japan	Kohei Kawata (from Gamba Osaka)
—	MF	Japan	Masaki Watanabe (from Giravanz Kitakyushu)
—	MF	Japan	Koji Noda (from V-Varen Nagasaki)

Out: Note: Flags indicate national team as defined under FIFA eligibility rules; some limited exceptions apply. Players may hold more than one non-FIFA nationality.

No.	Pos.	Nation	Player
—	GK	Japan	Hiroki Oka (on loan to JEF United Chiba)
—	DF	Japan	Sho Sasaki (to Sanfrecce Hiroshima)
—	MF	Japan	Masahiro Kaneko (to Zweigen Kanazawa, previously on loan)
—	MF	Japan	Koki Mizuno (to JEF United Chiba)
—	MF	Indonesia	Irfan Bachdim (to Consadole Sapporo)
—	FW	Brazil	Cristiano (loan to Kashiwa Reysol)
—	FW	Japan	Akito Kawamoto (loan to Yokohama FC)

=== Vegalta Sendai ===
In: Note: Flags indicate national team as defined under FIFA eligibility rules; some limited exceptions apply. Players may hold more than one non-FIFA nationality.

No.	Pos.	Nation	Player
1	GK	Japan	Yuji Rokutan (from Yokohama Marinos)
3	DF	Japan	Hirofumi Watanabe (from Kashiwa Reysol)
6	MF	South Korea	Kim Min-tae (from Kwangwoon University)
7	MF	Japan	Hiroaki Okuno (end of loan, return from V-Varen Nagasaki)
11	FW	Japan	Hidetaka Kanazono (from Jubilo Iwata)
14	MF	Japan	Jun Kanakubo (from Omiya Ardija, previously on loan to Kawasaki Frontale)
19	MF	Japan	Kyohei Sugiura (from Vissel Kobe)
22	GK	Japan	Kei Ishikawa (end of loan, return from Blaublitz Akita)
28	FW	Japan	Hiroki Yamamoto (on loan from Matsumoto Yamaga)
30	FW	Japan	Takuma Nishimura (from Toyama Daiichi High School)
31	MF	Japan	Shunsuke Motegi (promoted from youth ranks)
33	DF	Japan	Atsuto Tatara (from Matsumoto Yamaga)
36	DF	Japan	Kazuhiro Murakami (from Omiya Ardija, previously on loan)

Out: Note: Flags indicate national team as defined under FIFA eligibility rules; some limited exceptions apply. Players may hold more than one non-FIFA nationality.

No.	Pos.	Nation	Player
—	GK	Japan	Shigeru Sakurai (to Tochigi SC)
—	DF	Japan	Hironori Ishikawa (end of loan, return to Sanfrecce Hiroshima)
—	DF	Japan	Keisuke Harada (retired, previously on loan to Machida Zelvia)
—	DF	Japan	Norio Suzuki (end of contract)
—	DF	Brazil	Felipe Bortolucci Pires (on loan to Tochigi SC)
—	DF	Japan	Kodai Watanabe (to Montedio Yamagata)
—	DF	Japan	Makoto Kakuda (to Kawasaki Frontale)
—	MF	Japan	Hayato Sasaki (to Kyoto Sanga)
—	MF	Japan	Yoshiaki Ota (to Jubilo Iwata)
—	MF	Japan	Kohei Hattanda (end of loan, return to Shimizu S-Pulse)
—	FW	Japan	Atsushi Yanagisawa (retired)
—	FW	Japan	Takayuki Nakahara (to Avispa Fukuoka)
—	FW	Japan	Yuki Muto (to Urawa Red Diamonds)
—	FW	Japan	Shingo Akamine (to Gamba Osaka)

=== Shimizu S-Pulse ===
In: Note: Flags indicate national team as defined under FIFA eligibility rules; some limited exceptions apply. Players may hold more than one non-FIFA nationality.

No.	Pos.	Nation	Player
13	DF	Japan	Tomoya Inukai (end of loan, returned from Matsumoto Yamaga)
15	DF	Japan	Taisuke Muramatsu (end of loan, returned from Tokushima Vortis)
18	FW	Nigeria	Peter Utaka (from Beijing Guoan)
19	FW	Australia	Mitchell Duke (from Central Coast Mariners)
21	GK	Japan	Rikihiro Sugiyama (from Kawasaki Frontale)
22	MF	Japan	Takuma Edamura (end of loan, returned from Vissel Kobe)
26	DF	Japan	Shoma Kamata (from Shonan Bellmare)
27	GK	Japan	Kenta Uchida (end of loan, return from Kataller Toyama)
28	MF	Japan	Kohei Hattanda (end of loan, return from Vegalta Sendai)
31	GK	Japan	Kempei Usui (from JEF United Chiba)
32	DF	Japan	Ko Matsubara (from Hamamatsu Kaiseikan High School)
34	MF	Japan	Takuma Mizutani (promoted from youth ranks)
35	MF	Japan	Kota Miyamoto (promoted from youth ranks)
36	FW	Japan	Koya Kitagawa (promoted from youth ranks)
39	MF	Japan	Ryohei Shirasaki (end of loan, returned from Kataller Toyama)

Out: Note: Flags indicate national team as defined under FIFA eligibility rules; some limited exceptions apply. Players may hold more than one non-FIFA nationality.

No.	Pos.	Nation	Player
—	GK	Japan	Takashi Aizawa (to Tokushima Vortis)
—	GK	Japan	Yuya Miura (to V-Varen Nagasaki)
—	DF	South Korea	Lee Ki-Jae (end of contract)
—	DF	Japan	Yutaka Yoshida (to Sagan Tosu)
—	DF	Japan	Naoya Okane (to FC Gifu, previously on loan to Tochigi SC)
—	DF	Brazil	Wellington Daniel Bueno (end of loan, return to Vissel Kobe)
—	DF	Japan	Tomonobu Hiroi (to Zweigen Kanazawa)
—	MF	South Korea	Kang Sang-Ho (end of contract, previously on loan to Zweigen Kanazawa)
—	MF	South Korea	Lee Min-Soo (on loan to Machida Zelvia, previously on loan to Tochigi SC)
—	FW	Japan	Atomu Nabeta (end of contract, previously on loan to Avispa Fukuoka)
—	FW	Japan	Hiroki Higuchi (on loan to SC Sagamihara, previously on loan to Shonan Bellmare)
—	FW	Japan	Ibuki Fujita (on loan to Ehime FC)
—	FW	Japan	Yuji Senuma (on loan to Ehime FC)
—	FW	Japan	Toshiyuki Takagi (to Urawa Red Diamonds)
—	FW	Japan	Satoru Kashiwase (end of contract)
—	FW	Slovenia	Milivoje Novakovič (to Nagoya Grampus)

=== Shonan Bellmare ===
In: Note: Flags indicate national team as defined under FIFA eligibility rules; some limited exceptions apply. Players may hold more than one non-FIFA nationality.

No.	Pos.	Nation	Player
4	DF	Brazil	André Bahia (from Botafogo)
8	MF	Japan	Naoki Yamada (loan from Urawa Red Diamonds)
11	FW	Japan	Yoshihiro Fujita (from Yokohama Marinos)
14	MF	Japan	Seiya Fujita (from Albirex Niigata, previously on loan)
15	DF	South Korea	Kim Jong-pil (from Tokyo Verdy)
18	FW	Brazil	Allison (on loan from Mirassol)
20	DF	Japan	Keisuke Tsuboi (from Urawa Red Diamonds)
23	MF	Japan	Kaoru Takayama (from Kashiwa Reysol)
24	DF	Japan	Ryohei Okazaki (from Chuo University)
25	GK	South Korea	Lee Ho-seung (from Consadole Sapporo)
26	MF	Japan	Masataka Kani (loan from Kawasaki Frontale)
48	DF	Japan	Eijiro Takeda (from Yokohama Marinos, previously on loan to Avispa Fukuoka)
—	DF	Japan	Kenta Hirose (from Nippon Sport Science University)

Out: Note: Flags indicate national team as defined under FIFA eligibility rules; some limited exceptions apply. Players may hold more than one non-FIFA nationality.

No.	Pos.	Nation	Player
—	GK	Japan	Nobuyuki Abe (to Giravanz Kitakyushu)
—	GK	Japan	Yuta Suzuki (to Thespakusatsu Gunma)
—	DF	Japan	Hirokazu Usami (to Montedio Yamagata)
—	DF	Japan	Kenji Arabori (to Tochigi SC, previously on loan)
—	DF	Japan	Takahiro Yamaguchi (to Oita Trinita, previously on loan to V-Varen Nagasaki)
—	DF	Japan	Kohei Mihara (to Ehime FC, previously on loan)
—	DF	Japan	Masashi Kamekawa (on loan to Avispa Fukuoka)
—	DF	Japan	Yuichi Maruyama (end of loan, return loan to FC Tokyo)
—	DF	Japan	Shoma Kamata (to Shimizu S-Pulse)
—	DF	Japan	Shota Fukuoka (on loan to Fukushima United)
—	DF	Japan	Takuya Muraoka (to Fukushima United, previously on loan)
—	MF	Japan	Andrew Kumagai (end of loan, returned to Yokohama Marinos)
—	MF	Japan	Ken Iwao (on loan to Mito Hollyhock)
—	MF	Japan	Naoki Maeda (on loan to Fukushima United, promoted from youth ranks)
—	MF	Japan	Kosuke Taketomi (end of loan, return to Kashiwa Reysol)
—	MF	Japan	Hiroto Nakagawa (end of loan, return to Kashiwa Reysol)
—	MF	Japan	Ryohei Yoshihama (to Thespakusatsu Gunma)
—	MF	Japan	Yuki Igari (retired, previously on loan to Fukushima United)
—	FW	Japan	Hiroki Higuchi (end of loan, return to Shimizu S-Pulse)
—	FW	Brazil	Guima (contract ended)
—	FW	Japan	Ryosuke Kawano (on loan to Verspah Oita, previously on loan to Fukushima United)
—	FW	Japan	Tsuyoshi Miyaichi (on loan to Mito Hollyhock)
—	FW	Brazil	Wellington (to Ponte Preta)
—	FW	Japan	Kenji Baba (to Mito Hollyhock, previously on loan)

=== Matsumoto Yamaga ===
In: Note: Flags indicate national team as defined under FIFA eligibility rules; some limited exceptions apply. Players may hold more than one non-FIFA nationality.

No.	Pos.	Nation	Player
9	FW	Brazil	Obina (from América-MG)
13	DF	Japan	Keita Goto (from Fagiano Okayama)
14	FW	Japan	Tomoki Ikemoto (from Giravanz Kitakyushu)
15	DF	Japan	Tatsuya Sakai (on loan from Sagan Tosu)
19	MF	Brazil	Dorival (on loan from Tombense)
20	MF	Japan	Takayoshi Ishihara (from Fagiano Okayama)
21	GK	Japan	Tomoyuki Suzuki (from Tochigi SC)
22	MF	Japan	Naoki Maeda (on loan from Tokyo Verdy)
24	DF	Japan	Masahiro Nasukawa (from Tokushima Vortis)
27	MF	Japan	Ryutaro Shibata (from Takushoku University)
28	DF	Japan	Kenshiro Tanioku (from Juntendo University)
30	DF	Japan	Ryusuke Sakai (from Kyoto Sanga)
32	FW	Japan	Tomoyuki Arata (from Fagiano Okayama)
35	GK	Japan	Niall Killoran (from Tokyo Verdy)
39	FW	Japan	Yoshiro Abe (from Jubilo Iwata)

Out: Note: Flags indicate national team as defined under FIFA eligibility rules; some limited exceptions apply. Players may hold more than one non-FIFA nationality.

No.	Pos.	Nation	Player
—	GK	Japan	Kengo Nagai (on loan to Kataller Toyama)
—	GK	Japan	Yosuke Nozawa (to Albirex Niigata Singapore)
—	DF	Japan	Atsuto Tatara (to Vegalta Sendai)
—	DF	Japan	Mutsumi Tamabayashi (to Ehime FC)
—	DF	Japan	Kazuya Iio (retired)
—	DF	Japan	Tomoya Inukai (end of loan, returned to Shimizu S-Pulse)
—	DF	Japan	Shusaku Tokita (on loan to Azul Claro Numazu, previously on loan to Grulla Morioka)
—	MF	Japan	Ryota Iwabuchi (on loan to FC Ryukyu, previously on loan to Renofa Yamaguchi)
—	MF	South Korea	Yoon Sung-yeul (to Seoul E-Land FC)
—	MF	South Korea	Park Kwang-Il (on loan to Mito Hollyhock)
—	FW	Japan	Takayuki Funayama (to Kawasaki Frontale)
—	FW	Japan	Hiroki Yamamoto (to Vegalta Sendai)
—	FW	South Korea	Lee Jun-hyeob (end of contract)
—	FW	Brazil	Sabiá (end of contract)
—	FW	Japan	Yuki Kitai (to Kataller Toyama)

=== Montedio Yamagata ===
In: Note: Flags indicate national team as defined under FIFA eligibility rules; some limited exceptions apply. Players may hold more than one non-FIFA nationality.

No.	Pos.	Nation	Player
1	GK	Japan	Norihiro Yamagishi (from Urawa Red Diamonds, previously on loan)
3	DF	Japan	Kodai Watanabe (from Vegalta Sendai)
5	MF	Brazil	Alceu (from Marilia)
20	MF	Japan	Keita Hidaka (first released, then new contract)
21	GK	Japan	Hayato Nakamura (end of loan, return from V-Varen Nagasaki)
23	DF	Japan	Kazuki Segawa (from Thespakusatsu Gunma)
26	DF	Japan	Hirokazu Usami (from Shonan Bellmare)
27	DF	Japan	Toshiya Takagi (from Kanagawa University)
28	GK	Japan	Hayato Settsu (promoted from youth ranks)
29	FW	Japan	Shota Kawanishi (from Gamba Osaka, previously on loan)

Out: Note: Flags indicate national team as defined under FIFA eligibility rules; some limited exceptions apply. Players may hold more than one non-FIFA nationality.

No.	Pos.	Nation	Player
—	GK	Japan	Kenta Shimizu (to Kamatamare Sanuki)
—	GK	Japan	Satoshi Tokizawa (to FC Gifu)
—	DF	Japan	Ryo Kobayashi (to Thespakusatsu Gunma)
—	DF	Japan	Tsubasa Suzuki (to Arterivo Wakayama)
—	DF	Japan	Hidenori Ishii (to Tokushima Vortis)
—	DF	South Korea	Lee Joo-young (end of contract)
—	MF	Japan	Masaru Akiba (on loan to Zweigen Kanazawa)
—	MF	Japan	Tomoyasu Hirose (to Tokushima Vortis, previously on loan)

== J. League Division 2 ==
=== Omiya Ardija ===
In: Note: Flags indicate national team as defined under FIFA eligibility rules; some limited exceptions apply. Players may hold more than one non-FIFA nationality.

No.	Pos.	Nation	Player
1	GK	Japan	Nobuhiro Kato (from Urawa Red Diamonds)
3	DF	Japan	Hiroyuki Komoto (from Vissel Kobe)
11	FW	Japan	Ryuji Bando (from Sagan Tosu)
14	FW	Japan	Shintaro Shimizu (end of loan, return from Fagiano Okayama)
17	MF	Japan	Shigeru Yokotani (from Kyoto Sanga)
20	MF	Japan	Tsubasa Oya (from Vissel Kobe)
21	GK	Japan	Hitoshi Shiota (from FC Tokyo)
25	DF	Japan	Kazuma Takayama (promoted from youth ranks)
26	MF	Japan	Masato Kojima (promoted from youth ranks)

Out: Note: Flags indicate national team as defined under FIFA eligibility rules; some limited exceptions apply. Players may hold more than one non-FIFA nationality.

No.	Pos.	Nation	Player
—	GK	Japan	Koji Ezumi (to Kataller Toyama)
—	GK	Japan	Takashi Kitano (end of contract)
—	DF	Japan	Hokuto Nakamura (to Avispa Fukuoka)
—	DF	Japan	Kazuhiro Murakami (to Vegalta Sendai, previously on loan)
—	DF	Japan	Shohei Takahashi (to Vissel Kobe)
—	MF	Japan	Chikashi Masuda (end of loan, return to Ulsan Hyundai)
—	MF	Japan	Kota Ueda (to Jubilo Iwata, previously on loan to Fagiano Okayama)
—	MF	Japan	Koji Hashimoto (to Kawasaki Frontale)
—	MF	Japan	Jun Kanakubo (to Vegalta Sendai, previously on loan to Kawasaki Frontale)
—	MF	South Korea	Lee Keun-Ho (end of contract, previously on loan to Blaublitz Akita)
—	MF	Brazil	Mateus (end of loan, return to Bahia)
—	MF	Japan	Taisuke Miyazaki (to Machida Zelvia, previously on loan to Thespakusatsu Gunma)
—	FW	Slovenia	Zlatan Ljubijankić (to Urawa Red Diamonds)
—	FW	Japan	Yu Hasegawa (to Tokushima Vortis)

=== Cerezo Osaka ===
In: Note: Flags indicate national team as defined under FIFA eligibility rules; some limited exceptions apply. Players may hold more than one non-FIFA nationality.

No.	Pos.	Nation	Player
7	MF	Japan	Pablo (loan from Atlético Paranaense)
20	FW	Japan	Keiji Tamada (from Nagoya Grampus)
22	DF	Japan	Sota Nakazawa (loan from Kawasaki Frontale)
25	MF	Japan	Daiki Kogure (end of loan, return from Tokushima Vortis)
28	DF	Japan	Hayato Nukui (promoted from youth ranks)
29	MF	Japan	Taiga Maikawa (promoted from youth ranks)
30	DF	Japan	Kenta Mukuhara (from FC Tokyo)
31	MF	Japan	Hideo Hashimoto (from Vissel Kobe)
32	MF	Japan	Kunimitsu Sekiguchi (from Urawa Red Diamonds)
33	DF	Japan	Teruyuki Moniwa (from (Thailand) Bangkok Glass FC)
34	MF	Japan	Masaki Sakamoto (promoted from youth ranks)
35	MF	Japan	Masaki Okino (promoted from youth ranks)
36	MF	Japan	Rei Yonezawa (promoted from youth ranks of Vissel Kobe)
37	DF	Japan	Jurato Ikeda (promoted from youth ranks of Mitsubishi Yowa)
38	MF	Japan	Masataka Nishimoto (promoted from youth ranks)

Out: Note: Flags indicate national team as defined under FIFA eligibility rules; some limited exceptions apply. Players may hold more than one non-FIFA nationality.

No.	Pos.	Nation	Player
—	GK	South Korea	Go Sung-yun (to Consadole Sapporo)
—	DF	South Korea	Ko Jang-dae (end of contract, previously on loan to MIO Biwako Shiga)
—	DF	Japan	Toru Araiba (retired)
—	DF	Japan	Yuki Kotani (loan to SC Sagamihara)
—	MF	Japan	Masato Kurogi (to V-Varen Nagasaki, previously on loan)
—	MF	Japan	Kai Hirano (loan to Army United)
—	MF	South Korea	Kim Seong-jun (end of loan, return to Seongnam FC)
—	FW	Japan	Kenyu Sugimoto (to Kawasaki Frontale)
—	FW	Japan	Takumi Minamino (to RB Salzburg)

=== Tokushima Vortis ===
In: Note: Flags indicate national team as defined under FIFA eligibility rules; some limited exceptions apply. Players may hold more than one non-FIFA nationality.

No.	Pos.	Nation	Player
1	GK	Japan	Takashi Aizawa (from Shimizu S-Pulse)
5	DF	Japan	Hidenori Ishii (from Montedio Yamagata)
7	FW	Japan	Yuji Kimura (from Oita Trinita)
15	MF	Japan	Tomoyasu Hirose (from Montedio Yamagata, previously on loan)
19	DF	Japan	Yuto Uchida (loan from Gamba Osaka)
20	MF	Colombia	Estiven (from Vissel Kobe, previously on loan)
18	FW	Japan	Akihiro Sato (from Gamba Osaka)
21	GK	Japan	Yasuhiro Watanabe (from Albirex Niigata)
22	DF	Japan	Rikuto Hirose (from Mito Hollyhock)
23	FW	Japan	Yu Hasegawa (from Omiya Ardija)
24	FW	Japan	Yoji Sasaki (from Tokyo Gakugei University)
25	DF	Japan	Daisuke Tomita (from Mito Hollyhock)
28	MF	Japan	Atsushi Izawa (from Ventforet Kofu, previously on loan to Kataller Toyama)

Out: Note: Flags indicate national team as defined under FIFA eligibility rules; some limited exceptions apply. Players may hold more than one non-FIFA nationality.

No.	Pos.	Nation	Player
—	GK	Japan	Kenya Matsui (on loan to Kawasaki Frontale)
—	GK	Japan	Goro Kawanami (to Albirex Niigata)
—	GK	Japan	Kazuki Abe (retired)
—	DF	Japan	Taisuke Muramatsu (end of loan, returned to Shimizu S-Pulse)
—	DF	Japan	Yoshiaki Kinoshita (on loan to FC Osaka)
—	DF	Japan	Mitsuru Chiyotanda (retired)
—	DF	Japan	Masahiro Nasukawa (to Matsumoto Yamaga)
—	MF	Brazil	Cleiton Domingues (end of contract, previously on loan to FC Gifu)
—	MF	Japan	Kohei Miyazaki (retired)
—	MF	Japan	Sho Hanai (to V-Varen Nagasaki)
—	MF	North Korea	Ri Yong-jik (to V-Varen Nagasaki)
—	MF	Japan	Shuto Kojima (end of loan, return to Urawa Red Diamonds)
—	MF	Japan	Daiki Kogure (end of loan, return to Cerezo Osaka)
—	FW	Japan	Hiroyuki Takasaki (to Kashima Antlers)
—	FW	Brazil	Douglas (on loan to Sanfrecce Hiroshima)
—	FW	Brazil	Adriano (to Ventforet Kofu)

=== JEF United Chiba ===
In: Note: Flags indicate national team as defined under FIFA eligibility rules; some limited exceptions apply. Players may hold more than one non-FIFA nationality.

No.	Pos.	Nation	Player
4	DF	Japan	Kengo Kitazume (from Senshu University)
5	MF	Brazil	Paulinho (from Tochigi SC)
11	FW	Slovenia	Nejc Pečnik (from Red Star Belgrade)
13	DF	Japan	Takashi Kanai (from Sagan Tosu)
22	GK	Japan	Hiroki Oka (on loan from Ventforet Kofu)
24	DF	Japan	Naoki Kuriyama (end of loan, return from Machida Zelvia)
27	MF	Japan	Itsuki Urata (promoted from youth ranks)
28	DF	Japan	Takuya Inui (from Kiryu Daiichi High School)
29	MF	Japan	Koki Mizuno (from Ventforet Kofu)
30	MF	Japan	Kyoga Nakamura (promoted from youth ranks)
32	FW	Japan	Takayuki Suzuki (from Mito Hollyhock)
—	DF	Japan	Ryoichi Kawazu (from Senshu University)
—	DF	Japan	Masato Ito (from Komazawa University)

Out: Note: Flags indicate national team as defined under FIFA eligibility rules; some limited exceptions apply. Players may hold more than one non-FIFA nationality.

No.	Pos.	Nation	Player
—	GK	Japan	Kempei Usui (to Shimizu S-Pulse)
—	DF	Japan	Takashi Amano (end of loan, return to Yokohama Marinos)
—	DF	Japan	Akira Takeuchi (to Nagoya Grampus)
—	DF	Japan	Ryosuke Yamanaka (end of loan, return to Kashiwa Reysol)
—	DF	Japan	Satoshi Yamaguchi (to Kyoto Sanga)
—	MF	Japan	Akihiro Hyodo (to Oita Trinita)
—	MF	Japan	Kei Yamaguchi (retired)
—	MF	South Korea	Nam Seung-woo (on loan to Tubize)
—	MF	Brazil	Jair (on loan to Caxias)
—	MF	Japan	Shuto Kono (end of loan, return to FC Tokyo)
—	FW	Brazil	Kempes (to Joinville)
—	FW	Japan	Akira Toshima (on loan to Machida Zelvia)
—	FW	Japan	Shohei Otsuka (to Giravanz Kitakyushu)

=== Jùbilo Iwata ===
In: Note: Flags indicate national team as defined under FIFA eligibility rules; some limited exceptions apply. Players may hold more than one non-FIFA nationality.

No.	Pos.	Nation	Player
7	MF	Japan	Kota Ueda (from Omiya Ardija)
8	FW	England	Jay Bothroyd (from (Thailand) Muanghthong United)
9	MF	Japan	Yoshiaki Ota (from Vegalta Sendai)
13	DF	Japan	Shusuke Tsubouchi (from Albirex Niigata)
15	FW	Brazil	Adaílton (on loan from Paraná Clube)
17	MF	Japan	Takafumi Shimizu (promoted from Chuo University)
20	FW	Japan	Yasuhito Morishima (loan from Kawasaki Frontale)
21	GK	Poland	Krzysztof Kamiński (from Ruch Chorzow)
30	MF	Japan	Riyika Uehara (promoted from youth ranks)
31	GK	Japan	Ko Shimura (from Ichiritsu Funabashi High School)
32	FW	Japan	Olivier Ryu Iwamoto (from Kagoshima Josei High School)
34	FW	Japan	Yuki Nakamura (from FC Gifu)
40	MF	Japan	Hayao Kawabe (loan from Sanfrecce Hiroshima)
—	FW	Japan	Sena Inami (loan from Sanfrecce Hiroshima, previously loan to V-Varen Nagasaki)

Out: Note: Flags indicate national team as defined under FIFA eligibility rules; some limited exceptions apply. Players may hold more than one non-FIFA nationality.

No.	Pos.	Nation	Player
—	GK	Japan	Yōsuke Fujigaya (to Gamba Osaka)
—	GK	Japan	Akihiko Takeshige (to Tochigi SC)
—	DF	Japan	Ryoma Ishida (end of contract for bad behaviour)
—	DF	Japan	Shunya Suganuma (to Kyoto Sanga)
—	MF	Brazil	Ferdinando (to Portuguesa)
—	MF	Japan	Minoru Suganuma (to Sagan Tosu, previously on loan)
—	MF	South Korea	Baek Sung-Dong (from Jubilo Iwata)
—	MF	Brazil	Tinga (end of contract)
—	FW	Japan	Ryohei Yamazaki (to Albirex Niigata)
—	FW	Japan	Ryoichi Maeda (to FC Tokyo)
—	FW	Brazil	Popo (to Portuguesa)
—	FW	Japan	Hidetaka Kanazono (to Vegalta Sendai)
—	FW	Japan	Yoshiro Abe (to Matsumoto Yamaga)

=== Giravanz Kitakyushu ===
In: Note: Flags indicate national team as defined under FIFA eligibility rules; some limited exceptions apply. Players may hold more than one non-FIFA nationality.

No.	Pos.	Nation	Player
1	GK	Japan	Nobuyuki Abe (from Shonan Bellmare)
6	DF	Japan	Hiroyuki Nishijima (from Yokohama FC)
16	DF	Japan	Kyohei Yumizaki (from Fukuoka University)
17	MF	Japan	Koken Kato (from Thespakusatsu Gunma)
20	FW	Japan	Yusuke Kondo (from Tochigi SC)
25	FW	Japan	Rui Komatsu (from Oita Trinita, previously on loan to V-Varen Nagasaki)
26	DF	Japan	Yukiya Kajiwara (promoted from youth ranks)
27	GK	Japan	Kaiho Nakayama (from Kindai University)
28	FW	Japan	Shohei Otsuka (from JEF United Chiba)
29	MF	Japan	Kengo Kotani (from NIFS Kanoya)

Out: Note: Flags indicate national team as defined under FIFA eligibility rules; some limited exceptions apply. Players may hold more than one non-FIFA nationality.

No.	Pos.	Nation	Player
—	GK	Japan	Koki Otani (end of loan, return to Urawa Red Diamonds)
—	GK	Japan	Takuya Matsumoto (to Blaublitz Akita)
—	DF	Japan	Masaki Tanaka (to Matsue City FC)
—	DF	Japan	Yuki Fuji (to FC Gifu)
—	DF	Japan	Isao Taniguchi (to Kagoshima United, previously on loan)
—	MF	Japan	Masaki Watanabe (to Ventforet Kofu)
—	MF	Japan	Shuto Suzuki (retired)
—	MF	Japan	Tomi Shimomura (retired)
—	FW	Japan	Kenta Kakimoto (end of contract)
—	FW	Japan	Tomoki Ikemoto (to Matsumoto Yamaga)

=== Oita Trinita ===
In: Note: Flags indicate national team as defined under FIFA eligibility rules; some limited exceptions apply. Players may hold more than one non-FIFA nationality.

No.	Pos.	Nation	Player
2	DF	Japan	Takahiro Yamaguchi (from Shonan Bellmare, previously on loan to V-Varen Nagasaki)
6	DF	Japan	Naoya Fukumori (from Kwansei Gakuin University)
7	FW	Japan	Hideya Okamoto (from Albirex Niigata)
10	FW	Brazil	Evandro (from Anapolina-GO)
15	DF	Japan	Yoshinori Suzuki (from Miyazaki Sangyo-keiei University)
17	MF	Japan	Rei Matsumoto (from Yokohama Marinos, previously on loan)
20	FW	Timor-Leste	Murilo de Almeida (from Al-Ettifaq)
22	GK	Japan	Tomohito Syugyo (from Machida Zelvia)
23	DF	Japan	Hironori Ishikawa (on loan from Sanfrecce Hiroshima, previously on loan to Vegalta Sendai)
24	MF	Japan	Yuya Himeno (promoted from youth ranks)
25	DF	Japan	Koyo Sato (promoted from youth ranks)
27	FW	Japan	Kazushi Mitsuhira (from Kyoto Sanga)
28	MF	Japan	Daisuke Sakai (promoted from youth ranks)
29	MF	Japan	Tomoki Iwata (promoted from youth ranks)
30	FW	Japan	Tsubasa Yoshihira (promoted from youth ranks)
33	MF	Japan	Akihiro Hyodo (from JEF United Chiba)

Out: Note: Flags indicate national team as defined under FIFA eligibility rules; some limited exceptions apply. Players may hold more than one non-FIFA nationality.

No.	Pos.	Nation	Player
—	GK	Japan	Keisuke Shimizu (to Kyoto Sanga, previously on loan to Albirex Niigata)
—	GK	Japan	Takuya Muro (retired)
—	DF	South Korea	Gang Yoon-goo (end of loan, return to Vissel Kobe)
—	DF	Japan	Ken Matsubara (to Albirex Niigata, previously on loan)
—	DF	Japan	Kazumichi Takagi (to FC Gifu)
—	DF	Japan	Shigeto Masuda (end of loan, return to Albirex Niigata)
—	MF	Japan	Daisuke Ito (to Fagiano Okayama)
—	MF	Japan	Kohei Tokita (to Machida Zelvia)
—	MF	Japan	Teruki Tanaka (end of loan, return to Nagoya Grampus)
—	FW	Japan	Yuji Kimura (to Tokushima Vortis)
—	FW	Japan	Yohei Hayashi (end of loan, return to FC Tokyo)
—	FW	Japan	Rui Komatsu (to Giravanz Kitakyushu)

=== Fagiano Okayama ===
In: Note: Flags indicate national team as defined under FIFA eligibility rules; some limited exceptions apply. Players may hold more than one non-FIFA nationality.

No.	Pos.	Nation	Player
8	MF	Japan	Kazuhito Watanabe (from Ehime FC)
21	DF	Japan	Akira Kaji (from Chivas USA)
24	MF	Japan	Shinya Yajima (loan from Urawa Red Diamonds)
33	MF	Japan	Daisuke Ito (from Oita Trinita)
35	DF	Japan	Daiki Iwamasa (from BEC Tero Sasana)
39	DF	Japan	Kojiro Shinohara (end of loan, return from Roasso Kumamoto)
—	GK	Japan	Kota Nitadori (from JFA Academy Fukushima)
—	GK	Japan	Tadashi Kiwada (promoted from youth ranks)
—	DF	Japan	Naoki Nishibayashi (promoted from youth ranks)
—	MF	Japan	Mikiharu Miyamoto (promoted from youth ranks)

Out: Note: Flags indicate national team as defined under FIFA eligibility rules; some limited exceptions apply. Players may hold more than one non-FIFA nationality.

No.	Pos.	Nation	Player
—	GK	Japan	Hidenori Mago (retired)
—	DF	Japan	Takashi Nishihara (retired)
—	DF	Japan	Keita Goto (to Matsumoto Yamaga)
—	MF	Japan	Kazuya Okazaki (on loan to Verspah Oita)
—	MF	Japan	Ren Sengoku (on loan to Nagano Parceiro)
—	MF	Japan	Takayoshi Ishihara (to Matsumoto Yamaga)
—	MF	Japan	Kota Ueda (end of loan, return to Omiya Ardija)
—	MF	Japan	Takayoshi Ishihara (to Matsumoto Yamaga)
—	MF	Japan	Takafumi Suzuki (to Machida Zelvia, previously on loan)
—	FW	Brazil	Hugo (end of contract)
—	FW	Japan	Tomoyuki Arata (to Matsumoto Yamaga)
—	FW	Japan	Shintaro Shimizu (end of loan, return to Omiya Ardija)
—	FW	Japan	Tsuyoshi Shinchu (to Fukushima United, previously on loan)

=== Kyoto Sanga ===
In: Note: Flags indicate national team as defined under FIFA eligibility rules; some limited exceptions apply. Players may hold more than one non-FIFA nationality.

No.	Pos.	Nation	Player
2	DF	Japan	Shunya Suganuma (from Jubilo Iwata)
3	DF	Japan	Satoshi Yamaguchi (from JEF United Chiba)
5	MF	South Korea	Kim Nam-Il (from Jeonbuk Hyundai Motors)
8	MF	South Korea	Hwang Jin-Sung (from AFC Tubize)
9	FW	Brazil	Daniel Lovinho (from Thespakusatsu Gunma)
10	MF	Japan	Riki Harakawa (end of loan, return from Ehime FC)
13	FW	Japan	Takumi Miyayoshi (end of loan, return from Kataller Toyama)
17	FW	Japan	Koki Arita (from Vissel Kobe, previously on loan)
21	GK	Japan	Keisuke Shimizu (from Oita Trinita)
23	MF	Japan	Atsushi Wada (from Kansai University)
24	DF	Japan	Kyohei Uchida (from Kansai University)
25	DF	Japan	Yuki Onishi (promoted from youth ranks)
27	MF	Japan	Yushi Nagashima (promoted from youth ranks)
29	MF	Japan	Masaya Okugawa (promoted from youth ranks)
32	MF	Japan	Hayato Sasaki (from Vegalta Sendai)

Out: Note: Flags indicate national team as defined under FIFA eligibility rules; some limited exceptions apply. Players may hold more than one non-FIFA nationality.

No.	Pos.	Nation	Player
—	GK	South Korea	Oh Seung-Hoon (end of contract)
—	DF	Japan	Ippei Kokuryo (on loan to MIO Biwako Shiga)
—	DF	Japan	Ryusei Saito (on loan to FC Osaka)
—	DF	Japan	Yusuke Higa (loan terminated, returned to Yokohama Marinos)
—	DF	Japan	Ryusuke Sakai (to Matsumoto Yamaga)
—	DF	Japan	Takashi Uchino (to Nagano Parceiro)
—	DF	Japan	Yuji Takahashi (on loan to Kamatamare Sanuki)
—	MF	Japan	Shigeru Yokotani (to Omiya Ardija)
—	MF	Brazil	Jairo (end of contract)
—	MF	Japan	Kohei Kudo (to Sanfrecce Hiroshima)
—	FW	Japan	Hideo Tanaka (loan terminated, returned to Vissel Kobe)
—	FW	Japan	Kazushi Mitsuhira (to Oita Trinita)
—	FW	Japan	Ryosuke Tamura (on loan to Sagan Tosu)

=== Consadole Sapporo ===
In: Note: Flags indicate national team as defined under FIFA eligibility rules; some limited exceptions apply. Players may hold more than one non-FIFA nationality.

No.	Pos.	Nation	Player
15	FW	Japan	Hiroyuki Furuta (end of loan, return from Kamatamare Sanuki)
17	MF	Japan	Junichi Inamoto (from Kawasaki Frontale)
22	MF	Japan	Yumemi Kanda (end of loan, return from SC Sagamihara)
24	DF	Japan	Akito Fukumori (loan from Kawasaki Frontale)
25	GK	South Korea	Go Sung-yun (from Cerezo Osaka)
26	MF	Indonesia	Irfan Bachdim (from Ventforet Kofu)
35	DF	Japan	Ryosuke Shindo (promoted from youth ranks)
42	MF	Brazil	Nildo (on loan from Avai)
50	FW	Colombia	Cristian Nazarit (from FC Gifu)

Out: Note: Flags indicate national team as defined under FIFA eligibility rules; some limited exceptions apply. Players may hold more than one non-FIFA nationality.

No.	Pos.	Nation	Player
—	GK	South Korea	Lee Ho-seung (to Shonan Bellmare)
—	DF	Japan	Ryota Matsumoto (to Machida Zelvia)
—	DF	Japan	Takuma Hidaka (to Kataller Toyama)
—	DF	Japan	Takuro Uehara (to Roasso Kumamoto)
—	DF	Japan	Tatsuki Nara (loan to FC Tokyo)
—	DF	Japan	Yuki Uchiyama (to Hougang United)
—	MF	Brazil	Renan (end of loan, return to Roma Esporte Apucarana)
—	MF	Japan	Stefano Lilipaly (end of contract)
—	FW	South Korea	Jeong Shung-Hoon (end of contract)
—	FW	Japan	Junki Yokono (to Fukushima United)
—	FW	Japan	Mitsuteru Kudo (on loan to SC Sagamihara)

=== Yokohama F.C. ===
In: Note: Flags indicate national team as defined under FIFA eligibility rules; some limited exceptions apply. Players may hold more than one non-FIFA nationality.

No.	Pos.	Nation	Player
4	DF	South Korea	Park Tae-Hong (from Kataller Toyama)
20	MF	Japan	Takahiro Nakazato (end of loan, return from Mito Hollyhock)
21	GK	Japan	Taiki Murai (end of loan, return from Ehime FC)
22	DF	Japan	Masaaki Ideguchi (end of loan, return from Yokohama FC Hong Kong)
27	DF	Japan	Shuma Kusumoto (from Sanno Institute of Management)
28	DF	Japan	Tsukasa Morimoto (end of loan, return from SC Sagamihara)
29	MF	Japan	Yuki Ueda (from Seiritsu Gakuen High School)
31	MF	South Korea	Bae Hu-Min (from Azul Claro Numazu)
33	FW	Japan	Shota Aoki (end of loan, return from FC Ryukyu)
39	FW	Japan	Tetsuya Okubo (end of loan, return from Tochigi SC)

Out: Note: Flags indicate national team as defined under FIFA eligibility rules; some limited exceptions apply. Players may hold more than one non-FIFA nationality.

No.	Pos.	Nation	Player
—	DF	Japan	Hiroyuki Nishijima (to Giravanz Kitakyushu)
—	DF	Brazil	Douglas Marques (end of contract)
—	MF	Japan	Yuki Matsushita (to Thespakusatsu Gunma)
—	FW	South Korea	Park Sung-Ho (end of contract)
—	FW	Brazil	Ronaldo (end of loan, return to Ituano)

=== Tochigi S.C. ===
In: Note: Flags indicate national team as defined under FIFA eligibility rules; some limited exceptions apply. Players may hold more than one non-FIFA nationality.

No.	Pos.	Nation	Player
1	GK	Japan	Akihiko Takeshige (from Jubilo Iwata)
3	DF	South Korea	Park Hyung-jin (loan from Sanfrecce Hiroshima)
4	DF	Japan	Kenji Arabori (from Shonan Bellmare, previously on loan)
5	DF	Japan	Kei Omoto (from Mito Hollyhock)
6	DF	South Korea	Han Hee-Hoon (from Ehime FC)
9	DF	Japan	Yudai Nishikawa (from Kataller Toyama, previously on loan)
13	FW	Japan	Akito Kawamoto (loan from Ventforet Kofu)
14	FW	Japan	Toyofumi Sakano (loan from Urawa Red Diamonds)
16	GK	Japan	Shigeru Sakurai (from Vegalta Sendai)
20	MF	South Korea	Lee Dae-heon (loan from Sanfrecce Hiroshima, previously loan to V-Varen Nagasaki)
21	GK	Japan	Daisuke Yoshimitsu (from NIFS Kanoya)
24	DF	Brazil	Felipe Bortolucci Pires (on loan from Vegalta Sendai)
30	MF	Japan	Isao Honma (from Albirex Niigata)
31	FW	Japan	Ryo Matsumura (loan from Vissel Kobe)

Out: Note: Flags indicate national team as defined under FIFA eligibility rules; some limited exceptions apply. Players may hold more than one non-FIFA nationality.

No.	Pos.	Nation	Player
—	GK	Japan	Kunihiro Shibazaki (retired)
—	GK	Japan	Tatsuya Enomoto (to FC Tokyo)
—	GK	Japan	Tomoyuki Suzuki (to Matsumoto Yamaga)
—	DF	Japan	Ryuga Suzuki (end of loan, return to Kashima Antlers)
—	DF	South Korea	Cha Young-Hwan (to Zweigen Kanazawa)
—	MF	Brazil	Paulinho (end of loan, return to Kawasaki Frontale)
—	FW	Japan	Kentaro Shigematsu (end of contract)
—	FW	Japan	Satoshi Kukino (to Machida Zelvia, previously on loan)
—	FW	Japan	Yusuke Kondo (to Giravanz Kitakyushu)
—	FW	Japan	Tetsuya Okubo (end of loan, return to Yokohama FC)

=== Roasso Kumamoto ===
In: Note: Flags indicate national team as defined under FIFA eligibility rules; some limited exceptions apply. Players may hold more than one non-FIFA nationality.

No.	Pos.	Nation	Player
2	MF	Japan	Kohei Kuroki (from Sagan Tosu, previously on loan)
3	DF	Japan	Shoto Suzuki (from Ryutsu Keizai University)
6	DF	Japan	Dai Fujimoto (end of loan, return from Renofa Yamaguchi)
8	MF	Japan	Issei Takayanagi (from Vissel Kobe, previously on loan)
9	FW	Japan	Satoshi Tokiwa (from Tokyo Verdy)
11	FW	Japan	Ryuichi Hirashige (from Thespakusatsu Gunma)
13	MF	Japan	Daiki Sawamoto (from Ohzu High School)
15	DF	Japan	Naoki Otani (loan from Sanfrecce Hiroshima)
16	MF	Japan	Masanobu Komaki (from Komazawa University)
19	FW	Japan	Tatsuya Tanaka (from Kyushu Sangyo University)
31	GK	Japan	Yutaro Hara (from Sanfrecce Hiroshima)
32	DF	South Korea	Kweon Han-Jin (from Thespakusatsu Gunma)
33	DF	Japan	Takuro Uehara (from Consadole Sapporo)

Out: Note: Flags indicate national team as defined under FIFA eligibility rules; some limited exceptions apply. Players may hold more than one non-FIFA nationality.

No.	Pos.	Nation	Player
—	DF	Japan	Nozomi Osako (to Verspah Oita)
—	DF	Japan	Taishin Morikawa (on loan to Gainare Tottori)
—	DF	Japan	Daisuke Yano (retired)
—	DF	Japan	Kojiro Shinohara (end of loan, return to Fagiano Okayama)
—	DF	Japan	Kosuke Yoshii (retired)
—	MF	Japan	Kento Hashimoto (end of loan, return to FC Tokyo)
—	MF	Japan	Taku Harada (retired)
—	MF	Japan	Chikara Fujimoto (retired)
—	MF	Brazil	Fabio Henrique Pena (to Goias)
—	MF	Japan	Hayato Nakama (on loan to Kamatamare Sanuki)
—	MF	Japan	Junki Goryo (to Kagoshima United)
—	MF	Japan	Keisuke Kai (to Nara Club, previously on loan)
—	MF	Japan	Yuki Yamazaki (to Tochigi Uva, previously on loan to Renofa Yamaguchi)
—	FW	Japan	Takashi Sawada (to Shimizu S-Pulse)
—	FW	Japan	Yutaro Takahashi (to V-Varen Nagasaki)

=== V-Varen Nagasaki ===
In: Note: Flags indicate national team as defined under FIFA eligibility rules; some limited exceptions apply. Players may hold more than one non-FIFA nationality.

No.	Pos.	Nation	Player
3	DF	South Korea	Cho Min-Woo (on loan from FC Seoul)
7	MF	North Korea	Ri Yong-jik (from Tokushima Vortis)
8	FW	Japan	Yu Kimura (on loan from Kashiwa Reysol)
10	MF	Japan	Sho Hanai (from Tokushima Vortis)
15	DF	Japan	Shohei Kishida (on loan from Sagan Tosu)
20	MF	Japan	Masato Kurogi (from Cerezo Osaka, previously on loan)
21	MF	Japan	Ryosuke Tone (from Nagoya Grampus)
24	DF	Japan	Kai Miki (on loan from Machida Zelvia)
31	GK	Japan	Yuya Miura (from Shimizu S-Pulse)
39	FW	Japan	Yutaro Takahashi (from Roasso Kumamoto)
43	GK	Japan	Yuki Uekusa (from Vissel Kobe, previously on loan)
—	DF	Japan	Dai Takeuchi (from Fukuoka University)
—	FW	Japan	Yosuke Kamigata (from Waseda University)
—	FW	Japan	Kohei Kitagawa (from Momoyama Gakuin University)

Out: Note: Flags indicate national team as defined under FIFA eligibility rules; some limited exceptions apply. Players may hold more than one non-FIFA nationality.

No.	Pos.	Nation	Player
—	GK	Japan	Hayato Nakamura (end of loan, return to Montedio Yamagata)
—	GK	Japan	Koshiro Funakawa (end of contract)
—	DF	Japan	Kazuya Kawabata (to ReiiMeer Aomori)
—	DF	Japan	Takuya Sugiyama (retired)
—	DF	Japan	Daisuke Fujii (end of contract)
—	DF	Japan	Kohei Shimoda (end of contract)
—	DF	Japan	Takahiro Yamaguchi (end of loan, return to Shonan Bellmare)
—	DF	Japan	Takuya Okamoto (end of loan, return to Urawa Red Diamonds)
—	MF	Japan	Koji Noda (to Ventforet Kofu)
—	MF	Japan	Masatoshi Mihara (end of loan, return to Vissel Kobe)
—	MF	Japan	Hiroaki Okuno (end of loan, return to Vegalta Sendai)
—	MF	South Korea	Jung Hoon-Sung (on loan to Grulla Morioka)
—	MF	Japan	Masaaki Nishimori (retired)
—	MF	Japan	Yukihiko Sato (retired)
—	MF	Japan	Kohei Yamada (to Nagano Parceiro, previously on loan)
—	MF	Japan	Sai Kanakubo (to Nagano Parceiro)
—	MF	Japan	Yuya Nakamura (end of contract)
—	FW	Japan	Rui Komatsu (end of loan, return to Oita Trinita)
—	FW	Japan	Atsushi Matsuo (on loan to Azul Claro Numazu)
—	FW	Japan	Satoshi Nakayama (to FC Ryukyu, previously on loan)
—	FW	Japan	Shoma Mizunaga (to Zweigen Kanazawa, previously on loan)

=== Mito Hollyhock ===
In: Note: Flags indicate national team as defined under FIFA eligibility rules; some limited exceptions apply. Players may hold more than one non-FIFA nationality.

No.	Pos.	Nation	Player
4	DF	Japan	Takamasa Yamazaki (from FC Kariya)
13	DF	Japan	Natsuki Mugikura (from Kashiwa Reysol)
14	FW	Japan	Tsuyoshi Miyaichi (on loan from Shonan Bellmare)
15	FW	Japan	Taisei Kadoguchi (from Kanto Daiichi High School)
16	MF	South Korea	Park Kwang-Il (on loan from Matsumoto Yamaga)
34	MF	Japan	Makito Yoshida (from Nagoya Grampus, previously on loan)
39	FW	Japan	Kenji Baba (from Shonan Bellmare, previously on loan)
—	DF	Japan	Junya Imase (from Kokushikan University)

Out: Note: Flags indicate national team as defined under FIFA eligibility rules; some limited exceptions apply. Players may hold more than one non-FIFA nationality.

No.	Pos.	Nation	Player
—	DF	Japan	Rikuto Hirose (to Tokushima Vortis)
—	DF	Japan	Daisuke Tomita (to Tokushima Vortis)
—	DF	Japan	Kei Omoto (to Yokohama FC)
—	MF	Japan	Takahiro Nakazato (end of loan, return to Yokohama FC)
—	MF	Japan	Kenta Nishioka (to Ang Thong FC)
—	MF	Japan	Tsubasa Nihei (end of contract)
—	MF	Japan	Tsukasa Ozawa (end of contract)
—	MF	Japan	Yuki Shimada (to Vonds Ichihara)
—	FW	Brazil	Osmar (end of contract)
—	FW	Japan	Takayuki Suzuki (to JEF United Chiba)

=== Avispa Fukuoka ===
In: Note: Flags indicate national team as defined under FIFA eligibility rules; some limited exceptions apply. Players may hold more than one non-FIFA nationality.

No.	Pos.	Nation	Player
2	DF	Japan	Mizuki Hamada (from Urawa Red Diamonds)
9	FW	Japan	Takayuki Nakahara (from Vegalta Sendai)
15	MF	Japan	Toshiya Sueyoshi (on loan from Sagan Tosu, previously on loan to Oita Trinita)
18	DF	Japan	Masashi Kamekawa (from Shonan Bellmare)
21	DF	China	Gao Zhunyi (from Kataller Toyama)
22	DF	Japan	Hokuto Nakamura (from Omiya Ardija)
23	GK	Japan	Kosuke Nakamura (on loan from Kashiwa Reysol)
26	MF	Japan	Yu Tamura (from Fukuoka University)
27	FW	Japan	Takahiro Kunimoto (from Urawa Red Diamonds)
33	MF	Japan	Jun Suzuki (from Tokyo Verdy)

Out: Note: Flags indicate national team as defined under FIFA eligibility rules; some limited exceptions apply. Players may hold more than one non-FIFA nationality.

No.	Pos.	Nation	Player
—	GK	Japan	Keisuke Shimizu (end of loan, return to Oita Trinita)
—	DF	South Korea	Oh Chang-Hyun (to FC Seoul)
—	DF	Japan	Kazuki Yamaguchi (retired)
—	DF	Japan	Tokio Hatamoto (to Grulla Morioka, previously on loan to Zweigen Kanazawa)
—	MF	Japan	Cristopher Tatsuki Kinjo (to FC Ryukyu)
—	MF	South Korea	Jang Jung-Won (end of contract, previously on loan to Renofa Yamaguchi)
—	MF	Malaysia	Tam Sheang Tsung (to Kataller Toyama)
—	FW	Japan	Atomu Nabeta (end of loan, return to Shimizu S-Pulse)

=== FC Gifu ===
In: Note: Flags indicate national team as defined under FIFA eligibility rules; some limited exceptions apply. Players may hold more than one non-FIFA nationality.

No.	Pos.	Nation	Player
3	DF	Japan	Kazumichi Takagi (from Oita Trinita)
7	FW	Brazil	Rodrigo Tiuí (from Linense-SP)
18	DF	Japan	Yuki Fuji (from Giravanz Kitakyushu)
20	DF	Japan	Naoya Okane (from Shimizu S-Pulse, previously on loan to Tochigi SC)
22	GK	Japan	Satoshi Tokizawa (from Montedio Yamagata)
23	MF	Japan	Yuto Ono (from Atlético San Luis)
26	DF	Japan	Keigo Omi (from Osaka Gakuin University)
27	MF	Japan	Ryutaro Karube (from Meiji University)
28	MF	Japan	Taisuke Mizuno (from Nagoya Grampus, previously on loan)
30	MF	North Korea	Chang-Su Yun (from FC Gifu Second)
32	MF	Japan	Yudai Ogawa (from Yamanashi Gakuin High School)
33	FW	Brazil	Léo Mineiro (from Atlético-PR)

Out: Note: Flags indicate national team as defined under FIFA eligibility rules; some limited exceptions apply. Players may hold more than one non-FIFA nationality.

No.	Pos.	Nation	Player
—	GK	Japan	Shogo Tokihisa (retired)
—	GK	Japan	Takahiro Takagi (to SC Sagamihara)
—	DF	Brazil	Alex Santos (to Maringá)
—	DF	Japan	Arata Sugiyama (retired)
—	DF	Japan	Shuto Tanaka (to Kagoshima United)
—	DF	Japan	Kosuke Kitani (retired)
—	DF	Japan	Yusuke Mori (end of loan, return to Tokyo Verdy)
—	DF	Japan	Tatsuya Arai (end of contract)
—	MF	Japan	Hirofumi Moriyasu (end of contract)
—	MF	Japan	Yusuke Sudo (to SC Sagamihara)
—	MF	Brazil	Cleiton Domingues (end of loan, return to Tokushima Vortis)
—	MF	Japan	Atsushi Mio (retired)
—	FW	Japan	Yuki Nakamura (to Jubilo Iwata)
—	FW	Japan	Taira Inoue (to SC Sagamihara)
—	FW	Colombia	Cristian Nazarit (to Consadole Sapporo)
—	FW	Brazil	Tiago Henrique Pereira (end of loan, return to Nagoya Grampus)
—	FW	Japan	Tomohiro Tanaka (on loan to Gainare Tottori)

=== Thespakusatsu Gunma ===
In: Note: Flags indicate national team as defined under FIFA eligibility rules; some limited exceptions apply. Players may hold more than one non-FIFA nationality.

No.	Pos.	Nation	Player
1	GK	Japan	Yuta Suzuki (from Shonan Bellmare)
8	MF	Brazil	Acleisson (from Comercial-SP)
10	FW	Brazil	Douglas Tanque (on loan from Corinthians)
11	MF	Brazil	Leandro Oliveira (from Rio Claro-SP)
15	MF	Japan	Ryohei Yoshihama (from Shonan Bellmare)
20	FW	Japan	Yosuke Komuta (from Komazawa University)
24	DF	Japan	Yusuke Kawagishi (from Komazawa University)
26	MF	Japan	Ataru Esaka (from Ryutsu Keizai University)
27	FW	Japan	Ryota Oiwa (from Shugakukan High School)
27	DF	Japan	Makoto Kobayashi (from Thespa Kusatsu Challengers)
30	MF	Japan	Yuki Matsushita (from Yokohama FC)
33	DF	Japan	Ryo Kobayashi (from Montedio Yamagata)
36	FW	Japan	Yuichiro Nagai (from Arterivo Wakayama)

Out: Note: Flags indicate national team as defined under FIFA eligibility rules; some limited exceptions apply. Players may hold more than one non-FIFA nationality.

No.	Pos.	Nation	Player
—	GK	Japan	Fumiya Iwamaru (retired)
—	GK	Japan	Keisuke Naito (to Machida Zelvia)
—	DF	Japan	Jo Kanazawa (retired)
—	DF	Japan	Kazuki Segawa (to Montedio Yamagata)
—	DF	South Korea	Hwang Tae-Jun (retired)
—	DF	South Korea	Kweon Han-Jin (to Roasso Kumamoto)
—	MF	Japan	Koken Kato (to Giravanz Kitakyushu)
—	MF	Japan	Ryota Nagata (to Kamatamare Sanuki)
—	MF	Japan	Taisuke Miyazaki (end of loan, return to Omiya Ardija)
—	FW	Brazil	Eder (end of contract)
—	FW	Japan	Kota Aoki (end of contract)
—	FW	Brazil	Daniel Lovinho (to Kyoto Sanga)
—	FW	Japan	Ryuichi Hirashige (to Roasso Kumamoto)

=== Ehime FC ===
In: Note: Flags indicate national team as defined under FIFA eligibility rules; some limited exceptions apply. Players may hold more than one non-FIFA nationality.

No.	Pos.	Nation	Player
5	FW	Japan	Ibuki Fujita (on loan from Shimizu S-Pulse)
6	DF	Japan	Kohei Mihara (from Shonan Bellmare, previously on loan)
10	FW	Japan	Yuji Senuma (on loan from Shimizu S-Pulse)
14	DF	Japan	Mutsumi Tamabayashi (from Matsumoto Yamaga)
15	MF	Japan	Kenya Okazaki (loan from Gamba Osaka)
22	MF	Japan	Takashi Kondo (from Waseda University)
24	DF	South Korea	Gang Yoon-goo (on loan from Vissel Kobe, previously on loan to Oita Trinita)
32	GK	South Korea	Park Seung-Gu (from FC Hanam)
—	DF	South Korea	Park Chan-Yong (from Daegu University)

Out: Note: Flags indicate national team as defined under FIFA eligibility rules; some limited exceptions apply. Players may hold more than one non-FIFA nationality.

No.	Pos.	Nation	Player
—	GK	Japan	Taiki Murai (end of loan, return to Yokohama FC)
—	GK	Japan	Eigo Sekine (retired)
—	DF	South Korea	Han Hee-Hoon (to Yokohama FC)
—	DF	South Korea	Kim Min-Je (to FC Seoul E-Land)
—	MF	Japan	Yuki Horigome (end of loan, return to Ventforet Kofu)
—	MF	Japan	Kazuhito Watanabe (to Fagiano Okayama)
—	MF	Japan	Riki Harakawa (end of loan, return to Kyoto Sanga)
—	FW	South Korea	Mun Dong-Ju (end of loan, return to FC Seoul)
—	FW	Brazil	Ricardo Lobo (to Doxa Katokopias F.C.)

=== Tokyo Verdy ===
In: Note: Flags indicate national team as defined under FIFA eligibility rules; some limited exceptions apply. Players may hold more than one non-FIFA nationality.

No.	Pos.	Nation	Player
9	FW	Brazil	Alan Pinheiro (on loan from Vitoria)
10	MF	Brazil	Bruno Coutinho (on loan from Shenzhen Ruby)
15	DF	Brazil	Wesley (from SC Sagamihara)
16	FW	Japan	Masaomi Nakano (promoted from youth ranks)
17	MF	Japan	Ryo Shibuya (from Chuo University)
19	DF	Japan	Satoru Oki (from Komazawa University)
20	MF	Japan	Kento Misao (promoted from youth ranks)
22	MF	Japan	Kodai Yasuda (end of loan, return from Gainare Tottori)
37	DF	South Korea	Ko Kyung-Joon (from South China AA)

Out: Note: Flags indicate national team as defined under FIFA eligibility rules; some limited exceptions apply. Players may hold more than one non-FIFA nationality.

No.	Pos.	Nation	Player
—	GK	Japan	Niall Killoran (to Matsumoto Yamaga)
—	DF	Japan	Shunsuke Tachino (to Matsue City FC)
—	DF	Japan	Takahiro Tanaka (to Briobecca Urayasu)
—	DF	Japan	Yusuke Mori (to SC Sagamihara)
—	DF	South Korea	Kim Jong-pil (to Shonan Bellmare)
—	MF	Japan	Naoki Maeda (on loan to Matsumoto Yamaga)
—	MF	Japan	Jun Suzuki (to Avispa Fukuoka)
—	MF	Japan	Keishi Kusumi (on loan to Verspah Oita)
—	MF	Brazil	Nildo (end of loan, return to Avaì)
—	FW	Japan	Satoshi Tokiwa (to Roasso Kumamoto)
—	FW	Japan	Naohiro Takahara (to SC Sagamihara, previously on loan)

=== Kamatamare Sanuki ===
In: Note: Flags indicate national team as defined under FIFA eligibility rules; some limited exceptions apply. Players may hold more than one non-FIFA nationality.

No.	Pos.	Nation	Player
1	GK	Japan	Kenta Shimizu (from Montedio Yamagata)
4	DF	Japan	Keigo Numata (from Gamba Osaka)
5	DF	Japan	Yuji Takahashi (on loan from Kyoto Sanga)
7	MF	Japan	Ryota Nagata (from Thespakusatsu Gunma)
23	FW	Japan	Tetsuya Kijima (from Machida Zelvia)
28	MF	South Korea	Han Chang-Joo (from Gwangyang Jecheol High School)
29	MF	Japan	Yuki Morikawa (from Ritsumeikan University)
31	MF	South Korea	Jeong Jin-ho (from Segyeong High School)
—	MF	Japan	Hayato Nakama (on loan from Roasso Kumamoto)

Out: Note: Flags indicate national team as defined under FIFA eligibility rules; some limited exceptions apply. Players may hold more than one non-FIFA nationality.

No.	Pos.	Nation	Player
—	GK	Japan	Koichiro Morita (end of contract)
—	DF	Japan	Shinsaku Mochidome (end of contract)
—	DF	Japan	Daisuke Fujii (end of loan, return to V-Varen Nagasaki)
—	DF	South Korea	Song Han-Ki (end of contract)
—	DF	Japan	Masato Osugi (to MIO Biwako Shiga)
—	DF	Japan	Hiroshi Hatano (retired)
—	FW	Japan	Hiroyuki Furuta (end of loan, return to Consadole Sapporo)
—	FW	Japan	Yasumasa Nishino (retired)

=== Zweigen Kanazawa ===
In: Note: Flags indicate national team as defined under FIFA eligibility rules; some limited exceptions apply. Players may hold more than one non-FIFA nationality.

No.	Pos.	Nation	Player
4	DF	South Korea	Cha Young-Hwan (from Yokohama FC)
13	FW	Japan	Shoma Mizunaga (from V-Varen Nagasaki, previously on loan)
14	MF	Japan	Masahiro Kaneko (from Ventforet Kofu, previously on loan)
25	DF	Japan	Yusuke Hoshino (from Senshu University)
27	DF	Japan	Tomonobu Hiroi (from Shimizu S-Pulse)
30	MF	Japan	Masaru Akiba (on loan from Montedio Yamagata)
—	MF	Japan	Shungo Tamashiro (from University of Tsukuba)
—	FW	Brazil	Jean Moser (from Metropolitano-SC)

Out: Note: Flags indicate national team as defined under FIFA eligibility rules; some limited exceptions apply. Players may hold more than one non-FIFA nationality.

No.	Pos.	Nation	Player
—	DF	Japan	Sunao Hozaki (end of contract)
—	DF	South Korea	Choi Ji-Hoon (end of contract)
—	DF	Japan	Tokio Hatamoto (end of loan, return to Avispa Fukuoka)
—	DF	Japan	Haruki Yamauchi (on loan to Matsue City FC)
—	MF	South Korea	Kang Sang-Ho (end of loan, return to Shimizu S-Pulse)
—	MF	Japan	Kento Onodera (on loan to Honda FC)
—	MF	Japan	Ryosuke Ochi (on loan to Fujieda MYFC)
—	MF	Japan	Shingo Honda (to Honda FC, previously on loan)

== J. League Division 3 ==
=== Kataller Toyama ===
In: Note: Flags indicate national team as defined under FIFA eligibility rules; some limited exceptions apply. Players may hold more than one non-FIFA nationality.

No.	Pos.	Nation	Player
2	DF	Japan	Takuma Hidaka (from Consadole Sapporo)
6	FW	Japan	Hiroki Tanaka (from Niigata University of Health and Welfare)
15	FW	Japan	Tomoya Nakanishi (from Momoyama Gakuin University)
18	MF	Japan	Naoto Yoshii (end of loan, return from Machida Zelvia)
21	GK	Japan	Koji Ezumi (from Omiya Ardija)
22	MF	South Korea	Lee Jae-Won (from Chungju Hummel FC)
23	FW	Japan	Tomoki Muramatsu (end of loan, return from Honda FC)
24	FW	Japan	Yoshiki Yamamoto (end of loan, return from Verspah Oita)
26	FW	Japan	Junki Mawatari (promoted from youth ranks)
28	DF	Japan	Kenzo Nanbu (from Chukyo University)
29	DF	Japan	Seiji Shindo (from Kokushikan University)
31	GK	Japan	Kengo Nagai (on loan from Matsumoto Yamaga)
32	MF	Malaysia	Tam Sheang Tsung (from Avispa Fukuoka)
37	FW	Japan	Yuki Kitai (from Matsumoto Yamaga)
—	FW	Japan	Nobuhisa Furukawa (from Esperanza SC)

Out: Note: Flags indicate national team as defined under FIFA eligibility rules; some limited exceptions apply. Players may hold more than one non-FIFA nationality.

No.	Pos.	Nation	Player
—	GK	Japan	Daichi Shibata (to Suzuka Rampole)
—	GK	Japan	Yuichi Mizutani (retired)
—	DF	Japan	Kenta Uchida (end of loan, return to Shimizu S-Pulse)
—	DF	Japan	Shota Kimura (end of contract)
—	DF	South Korea	Park Tae-Hong (to Yokohama FC)
—	DF	Japan	Yudai Nishikawa (to Yokohama FC, previously on loan)
—	DF	Japan	Takayuki Mae (end of loan, return to Consadole Sapporo)
—	DF	China	Gao Zhunyi (to Avispa Fukuoka)
—	DF	Japan	Michitaka Akimoto (end of contract)
—	DF	Japan	Takafumi Mikuriya (end of contract)
—	MF	Japan	Yusuke Tanahashi (to Vonds Ishihara)
—	MF	South Korea	Kim Young-Keun (end of contract)
—	MF	Japan	Ryohei Shirasaki (end of loan, returned to Shimizu S-Pulse)
—	FW	Japan	Takumi Miyayoshi (end of loan, return to Kyoto Sanga)

=== Nagano Parceiro ===
In: Note: Flags indicate national team as defined under FIFA eligibility rules; some limited exceptions apply. Players may hold more than one non-FIFA nationality.

No.	Pos.	Nation	Player
4	DF	Japan	Takashi Uchino (from Kyoto Sanga)
6	MF	Japan	Ren Sengoku (on loan from Fagiano Okayama)
8	MF	Japan	Tetsuya Kanno (from SC Sagamihara)
14	MF	Japan	Sai Kanakubo (from V-Varen Nagasaki)
33	MF	Japan	Kohei Yamada (from V-Varen Nagasaki, previously on loan)

Out: Note: Flags indicate national team as defined under FIFA eligibility rules; some limited exceptions apply. Players may hold more than one non-FIFA nationality.

No.	Pos.	Nation	Player
—	DF	Japan	Kohei Takano (retired)
—	DF	Japan	Shinya Hatate (retired)
—	DF	Japan	Ryosuke Kawanabe (to Gainare Tottori)
—	DF	Japan	Yuki Kawabe (end of contract)
—	MF	Japan	Keita Tanaka (to FC Ryukyu)
—	MF	Japan	Kenichi Nozawa (retired)
—	MF	Japan	Naoki Hatada (to Gainare Tottori)
—	FW	Japan	Yuta Shimomura (to FC Maruyasu Okazaki)
—	FW	Japan	Shogo Matsuo (to FC Ryukyu)

=== Machida Zelvia ===
In: Note: Flags indicate national team as defined under FIFA eligibility rules; some limited exceptions apply. Players may hold more than one non-FIFA nationality.

No.	Pos.	Nation	Player
1	GK	Japan	Keisuke Naito (from Thespakusatsu Gunma)
10	MF	Japan	Kohei Tokita (from Oita Trinita)
17	MF	Japan	Takafumi Suzuki (from Fagiano Okayama, previously on loan)
18	MF	Japan	Taisuke Miyazaki (from Omiya Ardija, previously on loan to Thespakusatsu Gunma)
19	DF	Japan	Ryota Matsumoto (from Consadole Sapporo)
23	FW	Japan	Akira Toshima (on loan from JEF United Chiba)
24	MF	South Korea	Lee Min-Soo (on loan from Shimizu S-Pulse, previously on loan to Tochigi SC)
25	DF	Japan	Naoto Hiraishi (from Toyo University)
38	FW	Japan	Satoshi Kukino (from Yokohama FC, previously on loan)

Out: Note: Flags indicate national team as defined under FIFA eligibility rules; some limited exceptions apply. Players may hold more than one non-FIFA nationality.

No.	Pos.	Nation	Player
—	GK	Japan	Tomohito Syugyo (to Oita Trinita)
—	DF	Japan	Keisuke Harada (retired, previously on loan from Vegalta Sendai)
—	DF	Japan	Taisei Fujita (retired)
—	DF	Japan	Naoki Kuriyama (end of loan, return to JEF United Chiba)
—	DF	Japan	Kai Miki (on loan to V-Varen Nagasaki)
—	DF	Japan	Takao Ishikawa (on loan to Azul Claro Numazu)
—	DF	Japan	Masato Mochizuki (on loan to Azul Claro Numazu)
—	MF	Japan	Naoto Yoshii (end of loan, return to Kataller Toyama)
—	MF	Japan	Ryoji Mano (to Fujieda MYFC)
—	MF	Japan	Yoshihiro Shoji (to Renofa Yamaguchi)
—	FW	Japan	Kento Shiratani (retired)
—	FW	Japan	Kazuto Ishida (to Renofa Yamaguchi, previously on loan)
—	FW	Japan	Seiya Murakami (to MIO Biwako Shiga)
—	FW	Japan	Shota Saito (on loan to Azul Claro Numazu)
—	FW	Japan	Shohei Amano (retired)
—	FW	Japan	Tetsuya Kijima (to Kamatamare Sanuki)

=== Gainare Tottori ===
In: Note: Flags indicate national team as defined under FIFA eligibility rules; some limited exceptions apply. Players may hold more than one non-FIFA nationality.

No.	Pos.	Nation	Player
3	DF	Japan	Ryosuke Kawanabe (from Nagano Parceiro)
6	MF	Japan	Naoki Hatada (from Nagano Parceiro)
11	FW	Japan	Tomohiro Tanaka (on loan from FC Gifu)
15	MF	Japan	Ryu Miyamoto (from Doshisha University)
19	DF	Japan	Taishin Morikawa (on loan from Roasso Kumamoto)
21	DF	Japan	Katsuhisa Inamori (from Gamba Osaka)
23	MF	Japan	Masaya Nozaki (from Urawa Red Diamonds), previously on loan to Avispa Fukuoka}}
24	MF	Japan	Yoshiyuki Okumura (from Osaka Keizai University)
25	MF	Japan	Masamichi Hayashi (from Osaka Sangyo University High School)
28	DF	Japan	Takashi Akiyama (from Kansai University)
31	GK	Japan	Hironobu Yoshizaki (from International Pacific University)
32	MF	Japan	Kazuki Tachibana (from Kokushikan University)

Out: Note: Flags indicate national team as defined under FIFA eligibility rules; some limited exceptions apply. Players may hold more than one non-FIFA nationality.

No.	Pos.	Nation	Player
—	GK	Japan	Kiyomitsu Kobari (retired)
—	DF	Japan	Keisuke Hayashi (to Nara Club)
—	DF	Japan	Kenta Togawa (to Fukushima United)
—	DF	Japan	Masaki Yanagawa (to Global FC)
—	DF	Japan	Shogo Fujimaki (to Veertien Mie)
—	DF	Japan	Tadayo Fukuo (to Fujieda MYFC)
—	MF	Japan	Kazuki Kuranuki (retired)
—	MF	Japan	Tsubasa Yokotake (end of contract)
—	MF	Japan	Eijiro Mori (to Grulla Morioka)
—	MF	Japan	Yasuhiro Okuyama (to ReinMeer Aomori)
—	MF	Japan	Kodai Yasuda (end of loan, return to Tokyo Verdy)
—	FW	Japan	Koya Tanio (to Matsue City FC)
—	FW	Brazil	Rafael Ramazotti (end of contract)
—	FW	Japan	Takahiko Sumida (to Grulla Morioka)
—	FW	Japan	Tatsuya Okamoto (retired)

=== Grulla Morioka ===
In: Note: Flags indicate national team as defined under FIFA eligibility rules; some limited exceptions apply. Players may hold more than one non-FIFA nationality.

No.	Pos.	Nation	Player
13	MF	South Korea	Jung Hoon-Sung (on loan from V-Varen Nagasaki)
16	MF	Japan	Eijiro Mori (from Gainare Tottori)
17	FW	Japan	Takahiko Sumida (from Gainare Tottori)
28	DF	Japan	Tokio Hatamoto (from Avispa Fukuoka)

Out: Note: Flags indicate national team as defined under FIFA eligibility rules; some limited exceptions apply. Players may hold more than one non-FIFA nationality.

No.	Pos.	Nation	Player
—	GK	Japan	Yoshito Matsushita (end of contract)
—	DF	Japan	Hikaru Fujishima (to Vanraure Hachinohe)
—	DF	Japan	Koya Saito (end of contract)
—	DF	Japan	Shuhen Doen (to Verspah Oita)
—	DF	Japan	Shusaku Tokita (end of loan, return to Matsumoto Yamaga)
—	MF	Japan	Eiji Tomii (to Fujieda MYFC)
—	MF	Japan	Shinji Morita (retired)
—	MF	Japan	Tetsuya Nakanishi (to Ganju Iwate)
—	FW	Japan	Kodai Sato (to Vanraure Hachinohe)
—	FW	Japan	Taro Sugahara (end of contract)

=== SC Sagamihara ===
In: Note: Flags indicate national team as defined under FIFA eligibility rules; some limited exceptions apply. Players may hold more than one non-FIFA nationality.

No.	Pos.	Nation	Player
7	FW	Japan	Taira Inoue (from FC Gifu)
9	FW	Brazil	Leozinho (from Macaé-RJ)
10	FW	Japan	Naohiro Takahara (from Tokyo Verdy, previously on loan)
13	FW	Japan	Hiroki Higuchi (on loan from Shimizu S-Pulse, previously on loan to Shonan Bellmare)
19	DF	Japan	Yusuke Mori (from Tokyo Verdy)
20	MF	Japan	Yusuke Sudo (from FC Gifu)
22	MF	Japan	Kohen Kuroki (from Yokohama FC youth ranks)
23	GK	Japan	Takahiro Takagi (from FC Gifu)
26	FW	Japan	Mitsuteru Kudo (on loan from Consadole Sapporo)
28	DF	Japan	Kyosuke Narita (from Hannan University)
31	DF	Japan	Yuki Kotani (on loan from Cerezo Osaka)

Out: Note: Flags indicate national team as defined under FIFA eligibility rules; some limited exceptions apply. Players may hold more than one non-FIFA nationality.

No.	Pos.	Nation	Player
—	DF	Japan	Yutaro Masuda (to MIO Biwako Shiga)
—	DF	Japan	Tsukasa Morimoto (end of loan, return to Yokohama FC)
—	DF	Brazil	Wesley (to Tokyo Verdy)
—	MF	Japan	Yuya Sano (end of contract)
—	MF	Japan	Masaya Suzuki (to Azul Claro Numazu)
—	MF	Japan	Yumemi Kanda (end of loan, return to Consadole Sapporo)
—	MF	Japan	Tetsuya Kanno (to Nagano Parceiro)
—	FW	Japan	Jun Suzuki (to Azul Claro Numazu)
—	FW	Japan	Yuki Matsumoto (to MIO Biwako Shiga)

=== Fukushima United ===
In: Note: Flags indicate national team as defined under FIFA eligibility rules; some limited exceptions apply. Players may hold more than one non-FIFA nationality.

No.	Pos.	Nation	Player
4	DF	Japan	Kenta Togawa (from Gainare Tottori)
7	FW	Japan	Hiroto Mogi (from Vissel Kobe)
9	FW	Japan	Junki Yokono (from Consadole Sapporo)
11	FW	Japan	Tsuyoshi Shinchu (from Fagiano Okayama, previously on loan)
18	DF	Japan	Yuji Hoshi (from Hosei University)
20	MF	Japan	Naoki Maeda (on loan from Shonan Bellmare, promoted from youth ranks)
28	DF	Japan	Shota Fukuoka (on loan from Shonan Bellmare)
—	DF	Japan	Takuya Muraoka (from Shonan Bellmare, previously on loan)
—	MF	Japan	Kota Hoshi (from Kanagawa University)

Out: Note: Flags indicate national team as defined under FIFA eligibility rules; some limited exceptions apply. Players may hold more than one non-FIFA nationality.

No.	Pos.	Nation	Player
—	DF	Japan	Takuya Komine (end of contract)
—	DF	Japan	Takuya Sugiyama (retired)
—	DF	Japan	Rui Tokisaki (retired)
—	MF	Japan	Makoto Shibahara (end of contract)
—	MF	Japan	Yoshihiro Masuko (end of contract)
—	MF	Japan	Yuki Igari (retired, previously on loan from Shonan Bellmare)
—	MF	Japan	Yuki Yamaguchi (end of contract)
—	FW	Japan	Ryosuke Kawano (end of loan, return to Shonan Bellmare)
—	FW	Japan	Yasutaka Kobayashi (end of contract)

=== Blaublitz Akita ===
In: Note: Flags indicate national team as defined under FIFA eligibility rules; some limited exceptions apply. Players may hold more than one non-FIFA nationality.

No.	Pos.	Nation	Player
8	MF	Japan	Tatsuya Kumagai (from Sendai University)
16	MF	Japan	Hirochika Miyoshi (from Esperanza SC)
19	MF	Chile	Agustin Leonardo Ortega (from Esperanza SC)
21	GK	Japan	Takuya Matsumoto (from Giravanz Kitakyushu)
33	FW	Japan	Takunosuke Funakawa (from Akita Shogyo High School)

Out: Note: Flags indicate national team as defined under FIFA eligibility rules; some limited exceptions apply. Players may hold more than one non-FIFA nationality.

No.	Pos.	Nation	Player
—	GK	Japan	Kei Ishikawa (end of loan, return to Vegalta Sendai)
—	MF	South Korea	Lee Keun-Ho (end of loan, return to Omiya Ardija)
—	FW	Japan	Takashi Fujii (to FC Ryukyu)

=== F.C. Ryukyu ===
In: Note: Flags indicate national team as defined under FIFA eligibility rules; some limited exceptions apply. Players may hold more than one non-FIFA nationality.

No.	Pos.	Nation	Player
7	MF	Japan	Keita Tanaka (from Nagano Parceiro)
9	FW	Japan	Satoshi Nakayama (from V-Varen Nagasaki, previously on loan)
13	DF	Japan	Tsubasa Nishida (from Azul Claro Numazu)
14	MF	Japan	Ryota Iwabuchi (on loan from Matsumoto Yamaga, previously on loan to Renofa Yamaguchi)
17	FW	Japan	Shogo Matsuo (from Nagano Parceiro)
20	DF	Japan	Taiki Kikuno (from Takushoku University)
21	GK	Japan	Taisuke Konno (from Tokyo International University)
23	FW	Japan	Ryuji Sato (from Tokyo International University)
24	FW	Japan	Takashi Fujii (from Blaublitz Akita)
26	MF	Burkina Faso	Bertrand Mac Gildas Oubida (from City College of New York)
27	MF	Japan	Cristopher Tatsuki Kinjo (from Avispa Fukuoka)

Out: Note: Flags indicate national team as defined under FIFA eligibility rules; some limited exceptions apply. Players may hold more than one non-FIFA nationality.

No.	Pos.	Nation	Player
—	GK	Japan	Sunao Kasahara (end of contract)
—	DF	Japan	Taishi Sunakawa (end of contract)
—	DF	Japan	Kazuya Kawabata (end of loan, return to V-Varen Nagasaki)
—	DF	Japan	Yuki Osawa (to Vonds Ichihara)
—	DF	Japan	Keitaro Koga (end of contract)
—	MF	Japan	Hikaru Mizuno (to Albirex Niigata Singapore)
—	FW	Japan	Kenya Maeshiro (end of contract)
—	FW	Japan	Reino Shimamura (end of contract)
—	FW	Japan	Satoru Makino (end of contract)
—	FW	Japan	Shota Aoki (end of loan, return to Yokohama FC)

=== Fujieda MYFC ===
In: Note: Flags indicate national team as defined under FIFA eligibility rules; some limited exceptions apply. Players may hold more than one non-FIFA nationality.

No.	Pos.	Nation	Player
14	MF	Japan	Naoki Ogawa (loan from Gamba Osaka)
18	MF	Japan	Eiji Tomii (from Grulla Morioka)
19	MF	Japan	Ryosuke Ochi (on loan from Zweigen Kanazawa)
22	FW	Japan	Ryoji Mano (from Machida Zelvia)
26	GK	Japan	Shota Tajima (from Osaka University of Economics)
27	MF	Japan	Takuya Mihashi (from Biwako Seikei Sport College)
28	DF	Japan	Koki Nakamura (from Biwako Seikei Sport College)
31	DF	Japan	Tadayo Fukuo (from Gainare Tottori)

Out: Note: Flags indicate national team as defined under FIFA eligibility rules; some limited exceptions apply. Players may hold more than one non-FIFA nationality.

No.	Pos.	Nation	Player
—	GK	Japan	Hiroyuki Matsumoto (end of contract)
—	GK	Japan	Kenta Oishi (end of contract)
—	DF	Japan	Daisuke Ichikawa (end of contract)
—	DF	Japan	Shunya Ando (to FC Maruyasu Okazaki)
—	MF	Japan	Masato Mizuki (to Azul Claro Numazu)
—	MF	Japan	Yuhei Marumoto (end of contract)
—	FW	Japan	Yusuke Ishii (end of contract)

=== Y.S.S.C. ===
In: Note: Flags indicate national team as defined under FIFA eligibility rules; some limited exceptions apply. Players may hold more than one non-FIFA nationality.

No.	Pos.	Nation	Player
20	FW	Japan	Masato Sasaki (from Toyo University)
21	DF	Japan	Hayate Yoshida (from YSCC Yokohama Second)
26	FW	Japan	Kentaro Gunji (from Kanagawa University)
27	MF	Japan	Sotaro Izumi (from Kwansei Gakuin University)
34	DF	Japan	Kazuya Nakayama (from Sendai University)
35	GK	Japan	Suguru Asanuma (from Toyo University)
—	DF	Japan	Kei Munechika (from Hosei University)

Out: Note: Flags indicate national team as defined under FIFA eligibility rules; some limited exceptions apply. Players may hold more than one non-FIFA nationality.

No.	Pos.	Nation	Player
—	GK	Japan	Toshihide Hirata (to FC Kariya)
—	DF	Japan	Shun Yaginuma (end of contract)
—	MF	Japan	Hisao Mita (end of contract)
—	FW	Japan	Kazuki Ito (end of contract)
—	FW	Japan	Shogo Iike (end of contract)
—	FW	Japan	Shota Minagawa (end of contract)
—	FW	Japan	Toru Iwasawa (retired)

=== Renofa Yamaguchi ===
In: Note: Flags indicate national team as defined under FIFA eligibility rules; some limited exceptions apply. Players may hold more than one non-FIFA nationality.

No.	Pos.	Nation	Player
6	DF	Japan	Kyohei Kuroki (from Verspah Oita)
7	MF	Japan	Takaki Fujimitsu (from Verspah Oita)
9	FW	Japan	Kazuto Kishida (from Machida Zelvia, previously on loan)
13	MF	Japan	Sho Matsumoto (loan from Yokohama Marinos)
21	DF	Japan	Yuma Hiroki (from Tokyo Gakugei University)
24	MF	South Korea	Kim Jeong-seok (loan from Sanfrecce Hiroshima, previously loan to Roasso Kumamoto)
25	MF	South Korea	Choi Ju-Yong (from Suwon Bluewings)
27	DF	Japan	Hiroya Izumi (from Tokuyama University)
30	GK	Japan	Masaaki Murakami (from Osaka University of H&SS)
44	MF	Japan	Yoshihiro Shoji (from Machida Zelvia)

Out: Note: Flags indicate national team as defined under FIFA eligibility rules; some limited exceptions apply. Players may hold more than one non-FIFA nationality.

No.	Pos.	Nation	Player
—	GK	Japan	Kento Terada (end of contract)
—	DF	Japan	Kengo Takata (to MIO Biwako Shiga)
—	DF	Japan	Yuto Uchiyama (end of contract)
—	DF	Japan	Dai Fujimoto (end of loan, return to Roasso Kumamoto)
—	DF	Japan	Mitsuyuki Yoshihiro (to MIO Biwako Shiga)
—	MF	Japan	Hiroshi Sakamoto (end of contract)
—	MF	Japan	Ryo Izuka (to FC Kariya)
—	MF	Japan	Kota Fukuhara (to FC Baleini Shimonoseki, previously on loan)
—	MF	South Korea	Jang Jung-Won (end of loan, return to Avispa Fukuoka)
—	MF	Japan	Masaaki Nishimori (retired)
—	MF	Japan	Ryoji Matsumoto (end of contract)
—	MF	Japan	Ryusei Tamura (to Dezzolla Shimane, previously on loan)
