= Tomii =

Tomii (written: 富井 or 富居) is a Japanese surname. Notable people with the surname include:

- Akira Tomii (富井 周, 1890–1959), Japanese diplomat
- Daiki Tomii (富居 大樹, born 1989), Japanese footballer
- Eiji Tomii (富井 英司, born 1987), Japanese footballer
- Gen Tomii (富井 彦, born 1973), Japanese Nordic combined skier
- Hajime Tomii (富井 一, born 1940), Japanese alpine skier
- Shinichi Tomii (富井 慎一, born 1980), Japanese modern pentathlete
- Sumihiro Tomii (富井 澄博, 1949–2013), Japanese alpine skier
- Tsuyoshi Tomii (富井 剛志, born 1971), Japanese alpine skier
