= Takashi Uchino =

Takashi Uchino is the name of:

- Takashi Uchino (footballer, born 1988), Japanese footballer
- Takashi Uchino (footballer, born 2001), Japanese footballer
