= Keisuke Shimizu =

Japanese footballer

Keisuke Shimizu 清水 圭介
Personal information
- Full name: Keisuke Shimizu
- Date of birth: November 25, 1988 (age 37)
- Place of birth: Kakogawa, Hyōgo, Japan
- Height: 1.83 m (6 ft 0 in)
- Position: Goalkeeper

Team information
- Current team: FC Basaro Hyogo
- Number: 21

Youth career
- 2004–2006: Takigawa Daini High School

Senior career*
Years	Team	Apps	(Gls)
2007–2013	Oita Trinita	95	(0)
2009	→ New Wave Kitakyushu (loan)	0	(0)
2014	Avispa Fukuoka	5	(0)
2015–2021	Kyoto Sanga	114	(0)
2022–2024	Cerezo Osaka	5	(0)
2025–	FC Basara Hyogo	0	(0)
Medal record
Oita Trinita
Winner	J.League Cup	2008
- * Club domestic league appearances and goals as of 23:11, 24 March 2026 (UTC)

Keisuke Shimizu (清水 圭介, Shimizu Keisuke; born November 25, 1988) is a Japanese footballer who plays as a goalkeeper for Kansai Soccer League club FC Basara Hyogo.

== Club statistics ==
As of 24 March 2026

Appearances and goals by club, season and competition
Club	Season	League			National cup (Note: Includes Emperors Cup)		League cup (Note: Includes J.League Cup)		Other		Total	
Club	Season	Division	Apps	Goals	Apps	Goals	Apps	Goals	Apps	Goals	Apps	Goals
Oita Trinita	2007	J.League Division 1	0	0	0	0	0	0	–		0	0
Oita Trinita	2008	J.League Division 1	0	0	1	0	0	0	–		1	0
Oita Trinita	2009	J.League Division 1	0	0	0	0	0	0	–		0	0
Oita Trinita	2010	J.League Division 2	13	0	1	0	0	0	–		14	0
Oita Trinita	2011	J.League Division 2	32	0	1	0	0	0	–		33	0
Oita Trinita	2012	J.League Division 2	40	0	0	0	0	0	–		40	0
Oita Trinita	2013	J.League Division 1	10	0	4	0	2	0	–		16	0
Oita Trinita	Total		95	0	7	0	2	0	0	0	104	0
New Wave Kitakyushu (loan)	2009	JFL	0	0	0	0	–		–		0	0
Avispa Fukuoka (loan)	2014	J.League Division 2	5	0	1	0	–		–		6	0
Kyoto Sanga F.C.	2015	J2 League	22	0	2	0	–		–		24	0
Kyoto Sanga F.C.	2016	J2 League	2	0	2	0	–		–		4	0
Kyoto Sanga F.C.	2017	J2 League	10	0	1	0	–		–		11	0
Kyoto Sanga F.C.	2018	J2 League	30	0	1	0	–		–		31	0
Kyoto Sanga F.C.	2019	J2 League	26	0	0	0	–		–		26	0
Kyoto Sanga F.C.	2020	J2 League	15	0	0	0	–		–		15	0
Kyoto Sanga F.C.	2021	J2 League	9	0	3	0	–		–		12	0
Kyoto Sanga F.C.	Total		114	0	9	0	0	0	0	0	123	0
Cerezo Osaka	2022	J1 League	3	0	3	0	6	0	–		12	0
Cerezo Osaka	2023	J1 League	2	0	1	0	1	0	–		4	0
Cerezo Osaka	2024	J1 League	0	0	1	0	0	0	–		1	0
Cerezo Osaka	Total		5	0	5	0	7	0	0	0	17	0
FC Basara Hyogo	2025	Kansai Soccer League	0	0	1	0	–		3 (Note: Appearances in All Japan Senior Football Championship)	0	4	0
Career total			223	0	23	0	9	0	3	0	258	0

== Honours and awards ==
=== Team ===
- J. League Cup - 2008
