= Lee Ho-seung =

South Korean footballer

Lee Ho-Seung
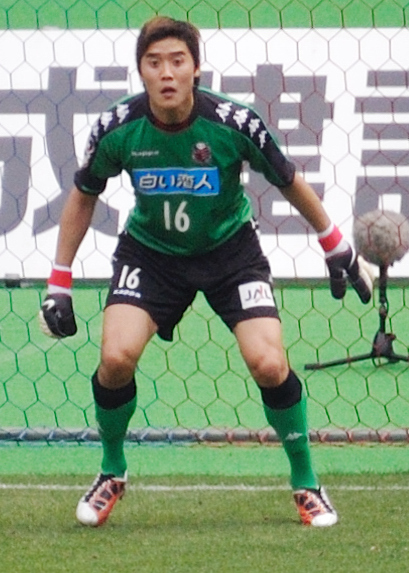

Personal information
- Date of birth: December 21, 1989 (age 36)
- Place of birth: South Korea
- Height: 1.88 m (6 ft 2 in)
- Position: Goalkeeper

Team information
- Current team: Jeonnam Dragons
- Number: 21

Senior career*
Years	Team	Apps	(Gls)
2011–2014	Consadole Sapporo	61	(0)
2015	Shonan Bellmare	1	(0)
2016–	Jeonnam Dragons	93	(0)
- * Club domestic league appearances and goals as of 26 November 2019

Lee Ho-Seung (Korean: 이호승; born December 21, 1989) is a South Korean football player who plays for Jeonnam Dragons.

== Club statistics ==
Club performance			League		Cup		Total	
Season	Club	League	Apps	Goals	Apps	Goals	Apps	Goals
Japan			League		Emperor's Cup		Total	
2011	Consadole Sapporo	J2 League	36	0				
Country	Japan		36	0				
Total			36	0				
