= Hideo Tanaka (footballer) =

Japanese footballer

Personal information
- Full name: Hideo Tanaka
- Date of birth: March 1, 1983 (age 43)
- Place of birth: Uki, Kumamoto, Japan
- Height: 1.72 m (5 ft 8 in)
- Position: Midfielder

Team information
- Current team: Tiamo Hirakata
- Number: 6

Youth career
- 2001–2004: NIFS

Senior career*
Years	Team	Apps	(Gls)
2005–2017	Vissel Kobe	264	(9)
2014	→ Kyoto Sanga FC (loan)	12	(0)
2018–2019	Tegevajaro Miyazaki	17	(0)
2018–2019	→ Kamatamare Sanuki (loan)	13	(0)
2019–	Tiamo Hirakata	26	(0)
- * Club domestic league appearances and goals as of 5 April 2022

Hideo Tanaka (田中 英雄, Tanaka Hideo; born March 1, 1983) is a Japanese professional footballer who plays as a midfielder for Japan Football League club Tiamo Hirakata.

== Career statistics ==
Updated to 8 March 2018.

Club performance			League		Cup		League Cup		Total	
Season	Club	League	Apps	Goals	Apps	Goals	Apps	Goals	Apps	Goals
Japan			League		Emperor's Cup		League Cup		Total	
2005	Vissel Kobe	J1 League	13	0	1	0	1	0	15	0
2006	Vissel Kobe	J2 League	37	7	0	0	-		37	7
2007	Vissel Kobe	J1 League	29	2	2	0	5	0	36	2
2008	Vissel Kobe	J1 League	27	2	2	0	5	0	34	2
2009	Vissel Kobe	J1 League	23	1	3	0	5	0	31	1
2010	Vissel Kobe	J1 League	15	0	0	0	6	0	21	0
2011	Vissel Kobe	J1 League	26	2	1	0	2	0	29	2
2012	Vissel Kobe	J1 League	27	1	1	0	5	0	33	1
2013	Vissel Kobe	J2 League	32	1	1	0	-		33	1
2014	Vissel Kobe	J1 League	4	0	0	0	1	0	5	0
2014	Kyoto Sanga	J2 League	12	0	0	0	-		12	0
2015	Vissel Kobe	J1 League	14	1	4	0	4	0	19	1
2016	Vissel Kobe	J1 League	15	0	0	0	6	0	21	0
2017	Vissel Kobe	J1 League	15	0	0	0	6	0	21	0
Career total			259	17	15	0	34	0	308	17
