= Taisuke Miyazaki =

Japanese footballer (born 1992)

Taisuke Miyazaki 宮崎 泰右
Personal information
- Full name: Taisuke Miyazaki
- Date of birth: May 5, 1992 (age 34)
- Place of birth: Kawagoe, Saitama, Japan
- Height: 1.68 m (5 ft 6 in)
- Position: Midfielder

Team information
- Current team: Shibuya City FC

Youth career
- 2005–2010: Omiya Ardija

Senior career*
Years	Team	Apps	(Gls)
2010–2013	Omiya Ardija	1	(0)
2012	→ Shonan Bellmare (loan)	16	(1)
2014	Thespakusatsu Gunma	36	(2)
2015–2016	Machida Zelvia	23	(4)
2016	→ Tochigi SC (loan)	16	(2)
2017–2019	Tochigi SC	24	(0)
2019	Vanraure Hachinohe	18	(0)
2020–	Shibuya City FC		
- * Club domestic league appearances and goals as of 22:05, 22 May 2019 (UTC)

Taisuke Miyazaki (宮崎 泰右, born May 5, 1992) is a Japanese football player who plays for Shibuya City FC.

== Career statistics ==
Updated to 23 February 2018.

Appearances and goals by club, season and competition
Club	Season	League			Emperor's Cup		J.League Cup		Total	
Club	Season	Division	Apps	Goals	Apps	Goals	Apps	Goals	Apps	Goals
Omiya Ardija	2010	J1 League	1	0	2	0	0	0	3	0
Omiya Ardija	2011	J1 League	0	0	0	0	0	0	0	0
Shonan Bellmare	2012	J2 League	16	1	1	0	—		17	1
Omiya Ardija	2013	J1 League	0	0	1	0	4	0	5	0
Thespakusatsu Gunma	2014	J2 League	36	2	3	0	—		39	2
Machida Zelvia	2015	J3 League	20	4	3	0	—		23	4
Machida Zelvia	2016	J2 League	3	0	–		–		3	0
Tochigi SC	2016	J3 League	16	2	–		–		16	2
Tochigi SC	2017	J3 League	20	0	–		–		20	0
Career total			112	9	10	0	4	0	126	2
