= Rui Komatsu =

Japanese footballer

Personal information
- Date of birth: August 29, 1983 (age 43)
- Place of birth: Aki, Kōchi, Japan
- Height: 1.91 m (6 ft 3 in)
- Position: Striker

Youth career
- 2002–2005: Kansei Gakuin University

Senior career*
Years	Team	Apps	(Gls)
2006–2011	Cerezo Osaka	146	(41)
2006	→ V-Varen Nagasaki (loan)	0	(0)
2012	Kawasaki Frontale	12	(0)
2013	Oita Trinita	5	(1)
2013–2014	V-Varen Nagasaki	42	(8)
2015–2017	Giravanz Kitakyushu	88	(22)
- * Club domestic league appearances and goals as of 26 February 2018

Rui Komatsu (小松 塁, Komatsu Rui; born August 29, 1983 in Kōchi) is a Japanese footballer who last played for Giravanz Kitakyushu as a striker.

== Career ==
Komatsu was chosen as one of the Designated Players for Development by J. League and JFA in 2005 when he was a student of Kwansei Gakuin University. Because of this status, he was able to register as a Cerezo Osaka player while he was still eligible to play for his university club. However, he did not play any official match for Cerezo.

After graduating from university in 2006, he officially signed with Cerezo. On 12 August 2006, he made his J. League debut in a 1–0 loss against Omiya Ardija. Two month later, he was loaned out to Kyu-League side V-Varen Nagasaki.

He returned to Cerezo for the 2007 season and his first goal for the club in a 3-1 win against Mito HollyHock, on May 23. During the 2007 season, he managed to form a strike partnership with fellow striker Tatsuya Furuhashi, as the pair scored a total of 30 goals between them.

Due to injuries, after three years with Giravanz Kitakyushu, Rui Komatsu opted to quit football and retired in January 2018 to become a coach at Cerezo Osaka.

== Career statistics ==
=== Club ===
Updated to 26 February 2018.

Club	Season	League		Emperor's Cup		J. League Cup		Asia		Total	
Club	Season	Apps	Goals	Apps	Goals	Apps	Goals	Apps	Goals	Apps	Goals
Cerezo Osaka	2006	1	0	0	0	0	0	-		1	0
V-Varen Nagasaki	2006	0	0	-		-		-		0	0
Cerezo Osaka	2007	32	12	2	0	-		-		34	12
Cerezo Osaka	2008	32	16	1	0	-		-		33	16
Cerezo Osaka	2009	35	6	1	0	-		-		36	6
Cerezo Osaka	2010	23	2	1	0	5	2	-		29	4
Cerezo Osaka	2011	23	5	3	1	1	0	6	1	33	7
Kawasaki Frontale	2012	12	0	1	0	2	0	-		15	0
Oita Trinita	2013	5	1	-		2	0	-		7	1
V-Varen Nagasaki	2013	12	4	1	0	-		-		13	4
V-Varen Nagasaki	2014	30	4	3	1	-		-		33	5
Giravanz Kitakyushu	2015	41	18	2	1	-		-		43	19
Giravanz Kitakyushu	2016	33	4	0	0	-		-		33	4
Giravanz Kitakyushu	2017	14	0	1	1	-		-		15	1
Career total		293	72	16	4	10	2	6	1	325	79
