= Jun Kanakubo =

Japanese footballer

Jun Kanakubo 金久保 順
Personal information
- Full name: Jun Kanakubo
- Date of birth: July 26, 1987 (age 39)
- Place of birth: Sakai, Ibaraki, Japan
- Height: 1.70 m (5 ft 7 in)
- Position: Midfielder

Youth career
- 2003–2005: Mito Keimei FC

Senior career*
Years	Team	Apps	(Gls)
2006–2009	Ryutsu Keizai University FC	35	(4)
2010–2012	Omiya Ardija	45	(4)
2013	Avispa Fukuoka	28	(3)
2014	Kawasaki Frontale	12	(1)
2015–2018	Vegalta Sendai	36	(3)
2018–2020	Kyoto Sanga	60	(3)
2021–2022	Mito HollyHock	14	(0)
Total		228	(18)
Medal record
Vegalta Sendai
Runner-up	Emperor's Cup	2018
- * Club domestic league appearances and goals

Jun Kanakubo (金久保 順, born July 26, 1987) is a Japanese former footballer player who played as a midfielder.

== Club statistics ==
Appearances and goals by club, season and competition
Club performance			League		Cup		League Cup		Continental		Total	
Season	Club	League	Apps	Goals	Apps	Goals	Apps	Goals	Apps	Goals	Apps	Goals
Japan			League		Emperor's Cup		J. League Cup		AFC		Total	
2006	Ryutsu Keizai; University FC	JFL	–		0	0	–		–		0	0
2007	Ryutsu Keizai; University FC	JFL	17	2	1	0	–		–		18	2
2008	Ryutsu Keizai; University FC	JFL	8	1	1	0	–		–		9	1
2009	Ryutsu Keizai; University FC	JFL	10	1	1	0	–		–		11	1
2010	Omiya Ardija	J1 League	19	2	3	0	6	0	–		28	2
2011	Omiya Ardija	J1 League	10	1	1	0	2	0	–		13	1
2012	Omiya Ardija	J1 League	16	1	0	0	6	0	–		22	1
2013	Avispa Fukuoka	J2 League	28	3	0	0	–		–		28	3
2014	Kawasaki Frontale	J1 League	12	1	2	0	3	0	2	0	19	1
2015	Vegalta Sendai	J1 League	20	1	4	0	1	0	–		25	1
2016	Vegalta Sendai	J1 League	14	2	0	0	2	0	–		16	2
2017	Vegalta Sendai	J1 League	2	0	0	0	1	0	–		3	0
2018	Vegalta Sendai	J1 League	0	0	0	0	1	0	–		1	0
2018	Kyoto Sanga	J2 League	16	0	0	0	–		–		16	0
2019	Kyoto Sanga	J2 League	22	2	0	0	–		–		22	2
2020	Kyoto Sanga	J2 League	22	1	–		–		–		22	1
2021	Mito HollyHock	J2 League	4	0	0	0	–		–		4	0
2022	Mito HollyHock	J2 League	10	0	0	0	–		–		10	0
Total			228	18	13	0	21	0	2	0	264	18
