= Daisuke Ito (footballer) =

Japanese footballer (born 1987)

Daisuke Ito 伊藤 大介
Personal information
- Full name: Daisuke Ito
- Date of birth: April 18, 1987 (age 39)
- Place of birth: Chiba, Japan
- Height: 1.69 m (5 ft 6 1/2 in)
- Position: Midfielder

Team information
- Current team: Criacao Shinjuku
- Number: 16

Youth career
- 1994–2005: JEF United Chiba Youth
- 2006–2009: Juntendo University

Senior career*
Years	Team	Apps	(Gls)
2010–2013	JEF United Chiba	83	(5)
2014	Oita Trinita	40	(5)
2015–2019	Fagiano Okayama	130	(12)
2019	SC Sagamihara	30	(1)
2020–	Criacao Shinjuku		
- * Club domestic league appearances and goals as of 16:35, 24 April 2021 (UTC)

Daisuke Ito (伊藤 大介, born April 18, 1987) is a Japanese footballer who plays as a central midfielder for Criacao Shinjuku. He is known as a free kick specialist.

== Club statistics ==
Updated to 23 February 2018.

Appearances and goals by club, season and competition
Club	Season	League			Emperor's Cup		Total	
Club	Season	Division	Apps	Goals	Apps	Goals	Apps	Goals
JEF United Chiba	2010	J2 League	11	0	2	0	13	0
JEF United Chiba	2011	J2 League	24	2	2	0	26	2
JEF United Chiba	2012	J2 League	25	2	4	0	29	2
JEF United Chiba	2013	J2 League	23	1	1	0	24	1
Oita Trinita	2014	J2 League	40	6	2	0	42	6
Fagiano Okayama	2015	J2 League	35	4	1	0	36	4
Fagiano Okayama	2016	J2 League	42	5	2	0	44	5
Fagiano Okayama	2017	J2 League	24	1	1	0	25	1
Total			224	20	15	0	239	20
