= Sena Inami =

Japanese retired footballer

Personal information
- Full name: Sena Inami
- Date of birth: June 25, 1992 (age 34)
- Place of birth: Ishikawa, Japan
- Height: 1.80 m (5 ft 11 in)
- Position: Midfielder

Youth career
- 2008–2010: Sanfrecce Hiroshima

Senior career*
Years	Team	Apps	(Gls)
2011–2013	Sanfrecce Hiroshima	5	(0)
2014	V-Varen Nagasaki	1	(0)
2015	Júbilo Iwata	0	(0)
Total		6	(0)
Medal record
Sanfrecce Hiroshima
Winner	J1 League	2012
Winner	J1 League	2013
Runner-up	Emperor's Cup	2013
- * Club domestic league appearances and goals

Sena Inami (井波 靖奈, Inami Sena; born June 25, 1992) is a Japanese retired football player from Kanazawa in Ishikawa, Japan. He played on the defense as a midfielder before joining the Sanfrecce Hiroshima Youth League as a forward. He later played for Sanfrecce Hiroshima as a winger. He retired as a player in 2016, joining the coaching staff of Júbilo Iwata.
