= Atomu Nabeta =

Japanese footballer

Personal information
- Full name: Atomu Nabeta
- Date of birth: May 1, 1991 (age 35)
- Place of birth: Shizuoka, Japan
- Height: 1.79 m (5 ft 10 1/2 in)
- Position: Forward

Youth career
- 2007–2009: Shimizu S-Pulse

Senior career*
Years	Team	Apps	(Gls)
2010–2014	Shimizu S-Pulse	13	(0)
2014	Avispa Fukuoka	8	(0)
Total		21	(0)
Medal record
Shimizu S-Pulse
Runner-up	J.League Cup	2012
Runner-up	Emperor's Cup	2010
- * Club domestic league appearances and goals

Atomu Nabeta (鍋田 亜人夢, Nabeta Atomu; born May 1, 1991) is a former Japanese football player.
