= Satoshi Tokizawa =

Japanese footballer (born 1985)

Satoshi Tokizawa 常澤 聡
Personal information
- Full name: Satoshi Tokizawa
- Date of birth: July 31, 1985 (age 41)
- Place of birth: Fujioka, Gunma, Japan
- Height: 1.86 m (6 ft 1 in)
- Position: Goalkeeper

Team information
- Current team: FC Maruyasu Okazaki
- Number: 21

Youth career
- 2001–2003: Maebashi Ikuei High School

Senior career*
Years	Team	Apps	(Gls)
2004–2006	Tokyo Verdy	0	(0)
2007–2010	Thespa Kusatsu	44	(0)
2011–2012	FC Tokyo	0	(0)
2013–2014	Montedio Yamagata	35	(0)
2015–2017	FC Gifu	25	(0)
2018	Thespakusatsu Gunma	0	(0)
2019–2023	FC Maruyasu Okazaki	0	(0)
Total		104	(0)
Medal record
Tokyo Verdy
Winner	Emperor's Cup	2004
FC Tokyo
Winner	Emperor's Cup	2011
Montedio Yamagata
Runner-up	Emperor's Cup	2014
- * Club domestic league appearances and goals as of 23 February 2020

Satoshi Tokizawa (常澤 聡, Tokizawa Satoshi; born July 31, 1985) is a Japanese football player.

== Club statistics ==
Updated to 23 February 2020.

Club performance			League		Cup		League Cup		Continental		Total	
Season	Club	League	Apps	Goals	Apps	Goals	Apps	Goals	Apps	Goals	Apps	Goals
Japan			League		Emperor's Cup		J.League Cup		AFC		Total	
2004	Tokyo Verdy	J1 League	0	0	0	0	0	0	-		0	0
2005	Tokyo Verdy	J1 League	0	0	0	0	0	0	-		0	0
2006	Tokyo Verdy	J2 League	0	0	0	0	-		0	0	0	0
2007	Thespa Kusatsu	J2 League	0	0	0	0	-		-		0	0
2008	Thespa Kusatsu	J2 League	1	0	0	0	-		-		1	0
2009	Thespa Kusatsu	J2 League	16	0	2	0	-		-		18	0
2010	Thespa Kusatsu	J2 League	27	0	1	0	-		-		28	0
2011	FC Tokyo	J2 League	0	0	0	0	-		-		0	0
2012	FC Tokyo	J1 League	0	0	0	0	0	0	-		0	0
2013	Montedio Yamagata	J2 League	35	0	0	0	-		-		38	0
2014	Montedio Yamagata	J2 League	0	0	0	0	-		-		0	0
2015	FC Gifu	J2 League	18	0	1	0	-		-		19	0
2016	FC Gifu	J2 League	7	0	0	0	-		-		7	0
2017	FC Gifu	J2 League	0	0	0	0	-		-		0	0
2018	Thespakusatsu Gunma	J3 League	0	0	0	0	-		-		0	0
2019	Montedio Yamagata	JFL	0	0	0	0	-		-		0	0
Career total			104	0	7	0	0	0	0	0	111	0
