= Tomoyasu Hirose =

Japanese footballer

Personal information
- Date of birth: 11 September 1989 (age 37)
- Place of birth: Saitama, Japan
- Height: 1.74 m (5 ft 8 1/2 in)
- Position: Midfielder

Senior career*
Years	Team	Apps	(Gls)
2008–2013	Montedio Yamagata	78	(3)
2014–2015	Tokushima Vortis	28	(1)
Total		106	(4)
- * Club domestic league appearances and goals

Tomoyasu Hirose (廣瀬 智靖, Hirose Tomoyasu; born 11 September 1989) is a former Japanese football player.

== Career statistics ==
Appearances and goals by club, season and competition
Club	Season	League			Emperor's Cup		J.League Cup		Total	
Club	Season	Division	Apps	Goals	Apps	Goals	Apps	Goals	!Apps	Goals
Montedio Yamagata	2008	J2 League	1	0	0	0	—		1	0
Montedio Yamagata	2009	J1 League	16	1	2	1	6	2	24	4
Montedio Yamagata	2010	J1 League	4	0	1	0	2	0	7	0
Montedio Yamagata	2011	J1 League								
Career total			21	1	3	1	8	2	32	4
