= Hirokazu Usami =

Japanese footballer (born 1987)

Hirokazu Usami 宇佐美 宏和
Personal information
- Full name: Hirokazu Usami
- Date of birth: June 18, 1987 (age 39)
- Place of birth: Moriguchi, Osaka, Japan
- Height: 1.71 m (5 ft 7 1/2 in)
- Position: Defender

Team information
- Current team: Fukushima United FC
- Number: 4

Youth career
- 1994–2005: Cerezo Osaka Youth
- 2006–2009: Kansai University

Senior career*
| Years | Team | Apps | (Gls) |
| 2010–2012 | Tochigi SC | 49 | (0) |
| 2013–2014 | Shonan Bellmare | 29 | (2) |
| 2015–2017 | Montedio Yamagata | 48 | (2) |
| 2018– | Fukushima United FC | | |
- * Club domestic league appearances and goals as of 23 February 2018

Hirokazu Usami (宇佐美 宏和, Usami Hirokazu; born June 18, 1987 in Osaka) is a Japanese football player who currently plays for Fukushima United FC.

== Career statistics ==
Updated to 23 February 2018.

| Club performance | | | League | | Cup | | League Cup | | Total | |
| Season | Club | League | Apps | Goals | Apps | Goals | Apps | Goals | Apps | Goals |
| Japan | | | League | | Emperor's Cup | | League Cup | | Total | |
|---|---|---|---|---|---|---|---|---|---|---|
| 2010 | Tochigi SC | J2 League | 9 | 0 | 0 | 0 | - | | 9 | 0 |
| 2011 | Tochigi SC | J2 League | 17 | 0 | 0 | 0 | - | | 17 | 0 |
| 2012 | Tochigi SC | J2 League | 23 | 0 | 1 | 0 | - | | 24 | 0 |
| 2013 | Shonan Bellmare | J1 League | 9 | 0 | 2 | 1 | 2 | 0 | 13 | 1 |
| 2014 | Shonan Bellmare | J2 League | 20 | 2 | 0 | 0 | - | | 20 | 2 |
| 2015 | Montedio Yamagata | J1 League | 15 | 0 | 2 | 0 | 0 | 0 | 17 | 0 |
| 2016 | Montedio Yamagata | J2 League | 31 | 2 | 2 | 0 | - | | 33 | 2 |
| 2017 | Montedio Yamagata | J2 League | 2 | 0 | 1 | 0 | - | | 3 | 0 |
| Career total | | | 126 | 4 | 8 | 1 | 2 | 0 | 135 | 5 |
