= Hironori Ishikawa =

Japanese footballer

Hironori Ishikawa 石川 大徳
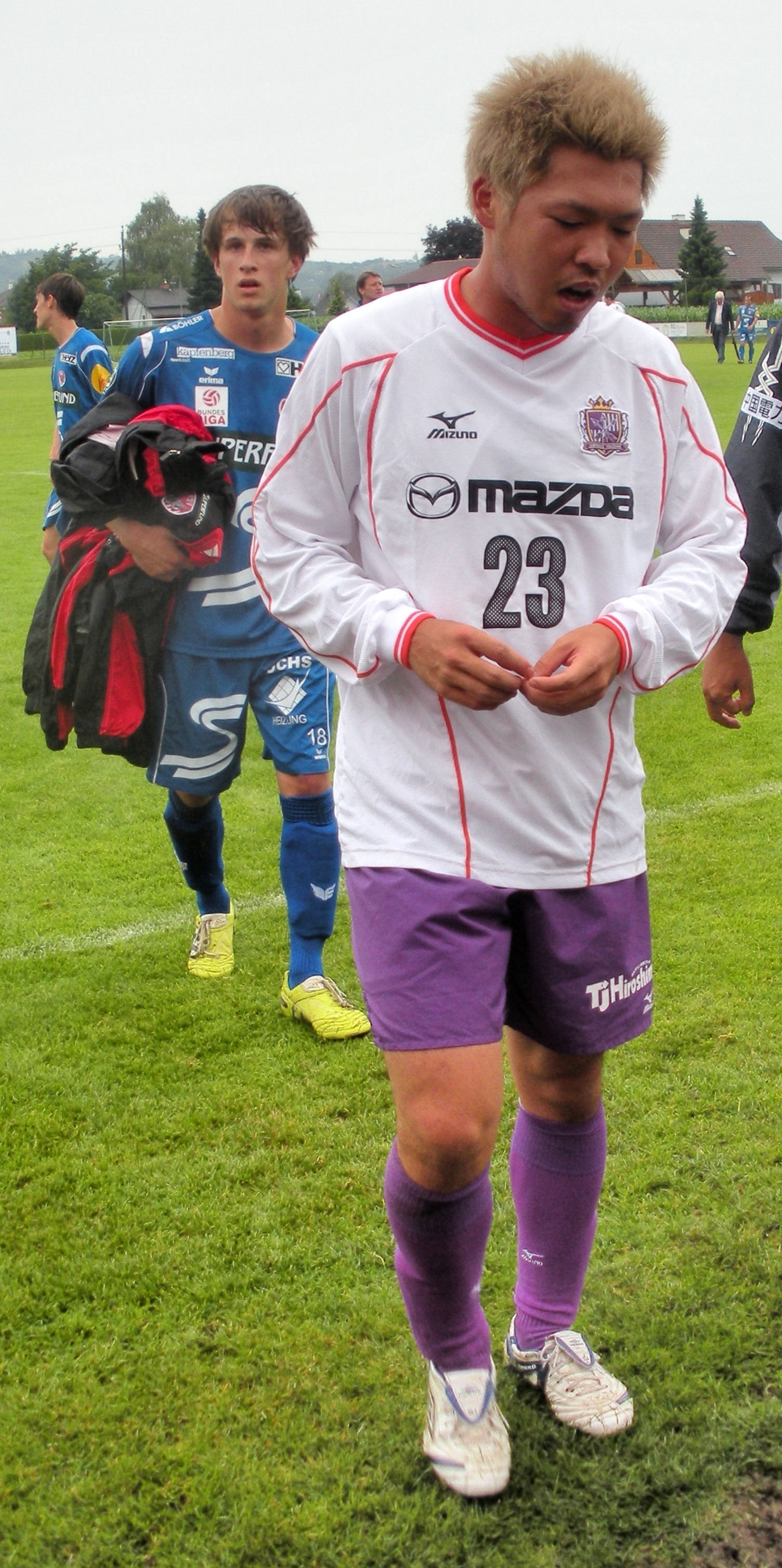
- Ishikawa with Sanfrecce Hiroshima in 2010

Personal information
- Full name: Hironori Ishikawa
- Date of birth: 6 January 1988 (age 38)
- Place of birth: Edogawa, Tokyo, Japan
- Height: 1.70 m (5 ft 7 in)
- Position: Midfielder

Youth career
- 2006–2009: Ryutsu Keizai University

Senior career*
Years	Team	Apps	(Gls)
2008	→ Mito HollyHock (loan)	1	(0)
2010–2015	Sanfrecce Hiroshima	35	(1)
2013–2014	→ Vegalta Sendai (loan)	10	(1)
2015	→ Oita Trinita (loan)	2	(0)
2015	→ Mito HollyHock (loan)	14	(0)
2016	Thespakusatsu Gunma	14	(0)
2016	→ SC Sagamihara (loan)	5	(0)
Medal record
Sanfrecce Hiroshima
Winner	J1 League	2012
Winner	J1 League	2013
Runner-up	J.League Cup	2010
Runner-up	Emperor's Cup	2013
- * Club domestic league appearances and goals as of 23 February 2017

Hironori Ishikawa (石川 大徳, Ishikawa Hironori; born 6 January 1988 in Edogawa, Tokyo) is a former Japanese footballer who last played for SC Sagamihara on loan from Thespakusatsu Gunma in the J3 League.

== Career statistics ==
Updated to 23 February 2017.

Club performance			League		Cup		League Cup		Continental		Other		Total	
Season	Club	League	Apps	Goals	Apps	Goals	Apps	Goals	Apps	Goals	Apps	Goals	Apps	Goals
Japan			League		Emperor's Cup		J. League Cup		AFC		Other^{1}		Total	
2006	Ryutsu Keizai University	JFL	20	0	0	0	-		-		–		20	0
2007	Ryutsu Keizai University	JFL	17	0	0	0	-		-		–		17	0
2008	Ryutsu Keizai University	JFL	17	1	0	0	-		-		–		17	1
2008	Mito HollyHock	J2 League	1	0	0	0	-		-		–		1	0
2009	Ryutsu Keizai University	JFL	10	1	2	0	-		-		–		12	1
2010	Sanfrecce Hiroshima	J1 League	1	0	1	0	0	0	2	0	–		2	0
2011	Sanfrecce Hiroshima	J1 League	11	0	1	0	2	0	–		–		14	0
2012	Sanfrecce Hiroshima	J1 League	20	1	1	0	6	0	–		1	0	28	1
2013	Sanfrecce Hiroshima	J1 League	3	0	–		0	0	4	0	1	0	8	0
2013	Vegalta Sendai	J1 League	8	1	1	0	–		–		–		9	1
2014	Vegalta Sendai	J1 League	2	0	0	0	1	0	–		–		3	0
2015	Oita Trinita	J2 League	2	0	–		–		–		–		2	0
2015	Mito Hollyhock	J2 League	14	0	2	0	–		–		–		16	0
2016	Thespakusatsu Gunma	J2 League	14	0	2	0	–		–		–		16	0
2016	SC Sagamihara	J3 League	5	0	–		–		–		–		5	0
Total			81	2	10	0	9	0	6	0	2	0	108	2

^{1}Includes Japanese Super Cup and FIFA Club World Cup.

== Honours ==
=== Club ===
Sanfrecce Hiroshima

- J. League Division 1 (2) : 2012, 2013
- Japanese Super Cup (1): 2013
