= Naoto Yoshii =

Japanese footballer

Personal information
- Date of birth: November 30, 1987 (age 38)
- Place of birth: Hyōgo, Japan
- Height: 1.80 m (5 ft 11 in)
- Position: Defender

Team information
- Current team: Kataller Toyama
- Number: 18

Youth career
- 2006–2009: Osaka Gakuin University

Senior career*
Years	Team	Apps	(Gls)
2010–	Kataller Toyama	67	(0)
2014	→ Machida Zelvia (loan)	8	(1)
- * Club domestic league appearances and goals as of 23 February 2016

Naoto Yoshii (吉井 直人, Yoshii Naoto; born 30 November 1987 in Hyōgo) is a Japanese former footballer who played as a defender. He retired from professional football on 1 February 2017, and as of 2024 he is the manager (監督, "kantoku") of the Chukyo University football club.

== Club statistics ==
Updated to 23 February 2016.

Club performance			League		Cup		Total	
Season	Club	League	Apps	Goals	Apps	Goals	Apps	Goals
Japan			League		Emperor's Cup		Total	
2010	Kataller Toyama	J2 League	6	0	0	0	6	0
2011	Kataller Toyama	J2 League	13	0	1	0	14	0
2012	Kataller Toyama	J2 League	18	0	1	0	19	0
2013	Kataller Toyama	J2 League	6	0	0	0	6	0
2014	Machida Zelvia	J3 League	8	1	–		8	1
2015	Kataller Toyama	J3 League	24	0	–		24	0
Total			75	1	2	0	77	1
