= Tokio Hatamoto =

Japanese footballer

Tokio Hatamoto 畑本時央
Personal information
- Full name: Tokio Hatamoto
- Date of birth: August 18, 1992 (age 34)
- Place of birth: Ōzu, Kumamoto, Japan
- Height: 1.79 m (5 ft 10 1/2 in)
- Position: Defender

Youth career
- 2008–2010: Urawa Red Diamonds Youth

Senior career*
Years	Team	Apps	(Gls)
2011–2014	Avispa Fukuoka	18	(0)
2014	→ Zweigen Kanazawa (loan)	6	(0)
2015–2018	Grulla Morioka	78	(6)
- * Club domestic league appearances and goals as of 23 February 2019

Tokio Hatamoto (畑本 時央, Hatamoto Tokio; born August 18, 1992) is a former Japanese football player.

== Career statistics ==
Updated to 23 February 2019.

Appearances and goals by club, season and competition
Club	Season	League			Emperor's Cup		J.League Cup		Total	
Club	Season	Division	Apps	Goals	Apps	Goals	Apps	Goals	Apps	Goals
Avispa Fukuoka	2011	J1 League	0	0	0	0	0	0	0	0
Avispa Fukuoka	2012	J2 League	16	0	0	0	—		16	0
Avispa Fukuoka	2013	J2 League	2	0	1	0	—		3	0
Zweigen Kanazawa	2014	J3 League	6	0	1	0	—		7	0
Grulla Morioka	2015	J3 League	12	0	1	0	—		13	0
Grulla Morioka	2016	J3 League	28	3	3	0	—		31	3
Grulla Morioka	2017	J3 League	28	3	2	0	—		30	3
Grulla Morioka	2018	J3 League	10	0	1	0	—		11	0
Career total			102	6	9	0	0	0	111	6
