= Hiroki Oka =

Japanese footballer

Hiroki Oka 岡 大生
Personal information
- Full name: Hiroki Oka
- Date of birth: April 18, 1988 (age 38)
- Place of birth: Aichi, Japan
- Height: 1.85 m (6 ft 1 in)
- Position: Goalkeeper

Team information
- Current team: Tochigi SC

Youth career
- 2004–2006: Shimizu Shogyo High School

College career
Years	Team	Apps	(Gls)
2007–2010	Komazawa University		

Senior career*
Years	Team	Apps	(Gls)
2011–2020	Ventforet Kofu	52	(0)
2015	→ JEF United Chiba (loan)	0	(0)
2020	→ Kataller Toyama (loan)	23	(0)
2021–	Tochigi SC	0	(0)
- * Club domestic league appearances and goals as of 21:48, 16 January 2021 (UTC)

Hiroki Oka (岡 大生, born April 18, 1988) is a Japanese football player who plays for Tochigi SC.

== Career statistics ==
Updated to 23 February 2018.

Appearances and goals by club, season and competition
Club	Season	League			Emperor's Cup		J.League Cup		Total	
Club	Season	Division	Apps	Goals	Apps	Goals	Apps	Goals	Apps	Goals
Ventforet Kofu	2011	J1 League	0	0	0	0	0	0	0	0
Ventforet Kofu	2012	J2 League	0	0	1	0	—		1	0
Ventforet Kofu	2013	J1 League	1	0	2	0	0	0	3	0
Ventforet Kofu	2014	J1 League	11	0	1	0	2	0	14	0
JEF United Chiba	2015	J2 League	0	0	0	0	—		0	0
Ventforet Kofu	2016	J1 League	0	0	0	0	1	0	1	0
Ventforet Kofu	2017	J1 League	23	0	0	0	1	0	24	0
Career total			35	0	4	0	4	0	43	0
