= Yuki Uekusa =

Japanese footballer

Yuki Uekusa 植草裕樹
Personal information
- Full name: Yuki Uekusa
- Date of birth: July 2, 1982 (age 44)
- Place of birth: Ichihara, Chiba, Japan
- Height: 1.86 m (6 ft 1 in)
- Position: Goalkeeper

Youth career
- 1998–2000: Municipal Funabashi High School
- 2001–2004: Waseda University

Senior career*
Years	Team	Apps	(Gls)
2005–2008	Kawasaki Frontale	0	(0)
2009–2011	Montedio Yamagata	18	(0)
2012–2014	Vissel Kobe	0	(0)
2014–2016	V-Varen Nagasaki	23	(0)
2016–2018	Shimizu S-Pulse	15	(0)
Medal record
Kawasaki Frontale
Runner-up	J1 League	2006
Runner-up	J1 League	2008
Runner-up	J.League Cup	2007
- * Club domestic league appearances and goals as of 17 December 2018

Yuki Uekusa (植草 裕樹, Uekusa Yūki; born July 2, 1982 in Ichihara, Chiba) is a Japanese football player currently playing for Shimizu S-Pulse.

== Club statistics ==
Updated to 23 February 2018.

Club performance			League		Cup		League Cup		Continental		Total	
Season	Club	League	Apps	Goals	Apps	Goals	Apps	Goals	Apps	Goals	Apps	Goals
Japan			League		Emperor's Cup		League Cup		Asia		Total	
2005	Kawasaki Frontale	J1 League	0	0	0	0	0	0	-		0	0
2006	Kawasaki Frontale	J1 League	0	0	0	0	0	0	-		0	0
2007	Kawasaki Frontale	J1 League	0	0	0	0	0	0	0	0	0	0
2008	Kawasaki Frontale	J1 League	0	0	1	0	4	0	-		5	0
2009	Montedio Yamagata	J1 League	0	0	2	0	1	0	-		3	0
2010	Montedio Yamagata	J1 League	2	0	1	0	6	0	-		9	0
2011	Montedio Yamagata	J1 League	16	0	2	0	1	0	-		19	0
2012	Vissel Kobe	J1 League	0	0	0	0	1	0	-		1	0
2013	Vissel Kobe	J2 League	0	0	2	0	-		-		1	0
2014	Vissel Kobe	J1 League	0	0	0	0	0	0	-		1	0
2014	V-Varen Nagasaki	J2 League	12	0	0	0	-		-		12	0
2015	V-Varen Nagasaki	J2 League	11	0	1	0	-		-		11	0
2016	V-Varen Nagasaki	J2 League	0	0	0	0	-		-		0	0
2016	Shimizu S-Pulse	J2 League	15	0	2	0	-		-		17	0
2017	Shimizu S-Pulse	J1 League	0	0	0	0	4	0	-		4	0
Career total			56	0	10	0	17	0	0	0	83	0
