= Tomohito Shugyo =

Japanese footballer

Tomohito Shugyo 修行 智仁
Personal information
- Full name: Tomohito Shugyo
- Date of birth: 29 June 1984 (age 42)
- Place of birth: Osaka City, Japan
- Height: 1.82 m (5 ft 11 1/2 in)
- Position: Goalkeeper

Youth career
- –1999: Vigore Tsurumi
- 2000–2002: Kindai University High School

College career
| Years | Team | Apps | (Gls) |
| 2003–2006 | Ritsumeikan University | | |

Senior career*
| Years | Team | Apps | (Gls) |
| 2007–2008 | Gainare Tottori | 3 | (0) |
| 2009–2014 | Machida Zelvia | 109 | (0) |
| 2015–2018 | Oita Trinita | 13 | (0) |
| 2019–2024 | FC Imabari | 89 | (0) |
- * Club domestic league appearances and goals as of 28 December 2022, 18:28 (UTC)

Tomohito Shugyo (修行 智仁, Shūgyō Tomohito, born June 29, 1984) is a Japanese football player who plays as a goalkeeper for FC Imabari.

== Career ==
=== FC Imabari ===
FC Imabari announced on 20 December 2018, that they had signed Shugyo.

== Career statistics ==
=== Club ===
Updated to the start of 2023 season.

| Club performance | | | League | | Cup | | Total | |
| Season | Club | League | Apps | Goals | Apps | Goals | Apps | Goals |
| Japan | | | League | | Emperor's Cup | | Total | |
|---|---|---|---|---|---|---|---|---|
| 2007 | Gainare Tottori | JFL | 0 | 0 | 0 | 0 | 0 | 0 |
| 2008 | Gainare Tottori | JFL | 3 | 0 | 0 | 0 | 3 | 0 |
| 2009 | Machida Zelvia | JFL | 30 | 0 | – | | 30 | 0 |
| 2010 | Machida Zelvia | JFL | 9 | 0 | 1 | 0 | 10 | 0 |
| 2011 | Machida Zelvia | JFL | 10 | 0 | 0 | 0 | 10 | 0 |
| 2012 | Machida Zelvia | J. League Div. 2 | 34 | 0 | 2 | 0 | 36 | 0 |
| 2013 | Machida Zelvia | JFL | 3 | 0 | – | | 3 | 0 |
| 2014 | Machida Zelvia | J3 League | 23 | 0 | – | | 23 | 0 |
| 2015 | Oita Trinita | J2 League | 1 | 0 | 2 | 0 | 3 | 0 |
| 2016 | Oita Trinita | J3 League | 12 | 0 | 1 | 0 | 13 | 0 |
| 2017 | Oita Trinita | J2 League | 0 | 0 | 2 | 0 | 2 | 0 |
| 2018 | Oita Trinita | J2 League | 0 | 0 | 0 | 0 | 0 | 0 |
| 2019 | FC Imabari | JFL | 27 | 0 | 0 | 0 | 27 | 0 |
| 2020 | FC Imabari | J3 League | 29 | 0 | 0 | 0 | 29 | 0 |
| 2021 | FC Imabari | J3 League | 25 | 0 | 1 | 0 | 26 | 0 |
| 2022 | FC Imabari | J3 League | 6 | 0 | 0 | 0 | 6 | 0 |
| 2023 | FC Imabari | J3 League | 0 | 0 | 0 | 0 | 0 | 0 |
| Total | | | 212 | 0 | 9 | 0 | 221 | 0 |
