= Eiji Tomii =

Japanese footballer

Personal information
- Full name: Eiji Tomii
- Date of birth: October 7, 1987 (age 39)
- Place of birth: Miyazaki, Japan
- Height: 1.71 m (5 ft 7 1/2 in)
- Position: Midfielder

Youth career
- 2003–2005: Yokohama F. Marinos
- 2006–2009: Hosei University

Senior career*
Years	Team	Apps	(Gls)
2010–2011	SC Sagamihara		
2012–2014	Grulla Morioka	53	(5)
2015	Fujieda MYFC	28	(1)
Total		81	(6)
- * Club domestic league appearances and goals

Eiji Tomii (富井 英司, Tomii Eiji; born October 7, 1987) is a former Japanese football player.

== Playing career ==
Eiji Tomii played for SC Sagamihara, Grulla Morioka and Fujieda MYFC from 2010 to 2015.
