= Takashi Uchino (footballer, born 1988) =

Japanese footballer

Takashi Uchino 内野 貴志
Personal information
- Full name: Takashi Uchino
- Date of birth: February 15, 1988 (age 38)
- Place of birth: Ōtsu, Shiga, Japan
- Height: 1.80 m (5 ft 11 in)
- Position: Defender

Team information
- Current team: MIO Biwako Shiga
- Number: 22

Youth career
- 2003–2005: Yasu High School

College career
Years	Team	Apps	(Gls)
2007–2010	Biwako Seikei Sport College		

Senior career*
Years	Team	Apps	(Gls)
2006	BSC Rosage		
2011–2014	Kyoto Sanga	34	(1)
2015–2019	Nagano Parceiro	84	(6)
2020–	MIO Biwako Shiga		
Medal record
Kyoto Sanga FC
Runner-up	Emperor's Cup	2011
- * Club domestic league appearances and goals as of 23 February 2020

Takashi Uchino (内野 貴志, born February 15, 1988) is a Japanese football player.

== Club statistics ==
Updated to 23 February 2020.

Club performance			League		Cup		Total	
Season	Club	League	Apps	Goals	Apps	Goals	Apps	Goals
Japan			League		Emperor's Cup		Total	
2011	Kyoto Sanga	J2 League	20	0	4	0	24	0
2012	Kyoto Sanga	J2 League	3	0	0	0	3	0
2013	Kyoto Sanga	J2 League	3	0	0	0	3	0
2014	Kyoto Sanga	J2 League	8	1	1	0	9	1
2015	Nagano Parceiro	J3 League	33	1	2	0	35	1
2016	Nagano Parceiro	J3 League	19	2	0	0	19	2
2017	Nagano Parceiro	J3 League	10	0	3	2	13	2
2018	Nagano Parceiro	J3 League	10	2	2	1	12	3
2019	Nagano Parceiro	J3 League	12	1	1	0	13	1
Total			118	7	13	3	131	10
