= 2013 FC Gifu season =

FC Gifu
2013 season
- Chairman: Kazuo Imanishi
- Manager: Koji Gyotoku
- J.League Division 2: 21st
- Emperor's Cup: Second round
Home colours	Away colours

The 2013 FC Gifu season sees FC Gifu compete in J. League Division 2 for the sixth consecutive season as well as competing in the 2013 Emperor's Cup.

== Players ==
As of August 8, 2013 Note: Flags indicate national team as defined under FIFA eligibility rules; some limited exceptions apply. Players may hold more than one non-FIFA nationality.

No.	Pos.	Nation	Player
1	GK	JPN	Takahiro Takagi
2	DF	JPN	Arata Sugiyama
3	DF	ITA	Desmond N'Ze (on loan from Fujieda MYFC)
4	DF	JPN	Shuto Tanaka
5	DF	JPN	Hiroshi Sekita
6	MF	JPN	Toshihiro Hattori (captain)
7	MF	JPN	Hidemi Jinushizono
8	MF	PRK	Ri Han-Jae
10	MF	JPN	Atsushi Mio
11	MF	JPN	Kazuki Someya
14	FW	JPN	Taira Inoue
15	MF	JPN	Masato Yamazaki
16	MF	JPN	Matazo Hirano
17	DF	JPN	Shun Nogaito
18	FW	JPN	Hiroyuki Sugimoto
19	MF	JPN	Tsukasa Masuyama

No.	Pos.	Nation	Player
20	DF	JPN	Tatsuya Arai
21	GK	JPN	Gakuji Ota
23	DF	JPN	Hirofumi Moriyasu
24	DF	JPN	Daiki Oizumi
25	MF	JPN	Takumi Kiyomoto
26	FW	JPN	Kohei Nakashima
27	FW	JPN	Hiroki Higuchi (on loan from Shimizu S-Pulse)
28	MF	JPN	Taisuke Mizuno (on loan from Nagoya Grampus)
29	MF	JPN	Makoto Shibahara (on loan from Shimizu S-Pulse)
30	FW	JPN	Yuki Nakamura
31	GK	JPN	Shogo Tokihisa
32	MF	KOR	Do Dong-Hyun
33	MF	NZL	Kayne Vincent
34	FW	MKD	Blazhe
35	DF	JPN	Kosuke Kitani (on loan from Sagan Tosu)
36	MF	CRO	Stipe Plazibat

=== Out on loan ===
Note: Flags indicate national team as defined under FIFA eligibility rules; some limited exceptions apply. Players may hold more than one non-FIFA nationality.

No.	Pos.	Nation	Player
—	GK	JPN	Tatsuya Murao (to Fujieda MYFC)
—	FW	BRA	Fábio (to Fukushima United)

== Competitions ==
=== J. League ===
==== League table ====
Pos	Team	Pld	W	D	L	GF	GA	GD	Pts	Promotion or relegation
18	Kataller Toyama	42	11	11	20	45	59	−14	44	
19	Roasso Kumamoto	42	10	13	19	40	70	−30	43	
20	Thespakusatsu Gunma	42	9	13	20	43	61	−18	40	
21	FC Gifu	42	9	10	23	37	80	−43	37	Ineligible for promotion
22	Gainare Tottori (R)	42	5	16	21	38	74	−36	31	Qualification for Relegation Playoffs (Note: Promotion/relegation play-offs between J2 and JFL tooke place between Kamatamare Sanuki, 2nd-placed club of 2013 Japan Football League with J. League Associate Membership, and 22nd-ranked club of 2013 J2 season.)

Updated to match(es) played on 8 December 2013. Source: J.League Division 2
Rules for classification: 1) points; 2) goal difference; 3) number of goals scored.
(R) Relegated

==== Matches ====
3 March 2013 1	FC Gifu	0–2	Yokohama FC	Gifu Nagaragawa Stadium
Sunday 15:05		Report	Okubo (yellow card) 18'; Nosaki 80'; Uchida 86'	Attendance: 5,006; Referee: Koya

10 March 2013 2	Vissel Kobe	4–0	FC Gifu	NOEVIR Stadium
Sunday 16:05	Tashiro 18' 63'; Kwang-Seon 22'; Popó 73'	Report	Sugiyama (yellow card) 21'	Attendance: 10,127; Referee: Ogiya

17 March 2013 3	FC Gifu	0–0	Gunma	Gifu Nagaragawa Stadium
Sunday 19:00		Report	Koyangi (yellow card) 14'; Yokoyama (yellow card) 55'; Endo (yellow card) 89'	Attendance: 2,510; Referee: Matsuo

20 March 2013 4	Ehime F.C.	0–0	FC Gifu	Ningineer Stadium
Wednesday 16:00	Shigematsu (penalty missed); Ishii (yellow card) 68'; Tomi (penalty missed)	Report	Tanaka (yellow card) 24'; Ri (yellow card) 36' (yellow-red card) 90+4'; Sekita (yellow card) 77'	Attendance: 2,159; Referee: Hidaka

24 March 2013 5	FC Gifu	0–1	Tokushima	Gifu Nagaragawa Stadium
Sunday 13:00	Fábio (yellow card) 8' (yellow-red card) 49'	Report	Kim 27'; Fukumoto (yellow card) 52'; Aoyama (yellow card) 55'	Attendance: 3,294; Referee: Tsukada

31 March 2013 6	Tokyo Verdy	3–0	FC Gifu	Ajinomoto Stadium
Sunday 16:00	Takahara 3'; Tokiwa 17'; Nishi 35'; Fukai (yellow card) 87'	Report	Someya (yellow card) 50'; Ri (yellow card) 56'; Desmond (yellow card) 84' (yellow-red card) 90+2'	Attendance: 3,068; Referee: Nakamura

7 April 2013 7	FC Gifu	0–3	Kyoto	Gifu Nagaragawa Stadium
Sunday 13:00		Report	Tamori (yellow card) 11'; Mitsuhira 61'; Someya (yellow card) 63'; Bajalica (yellow card) 66'; Hara 81' 90'	Attendance: 3,264; Referee: Ueda

14 April 2013 8	Matsumoto	1–2	FC Gifu	Matsumotodaira Football Stadium
Sunday 13:00	Tetsuto 41'; Iwabuchi (yellow card) 90+5'	Report	Desmond (yellow card) 32'; Arai 79' 84'	Attendance: 9,517; Referee: Maeda

17 April 2013 9	FC Gifu	2–3	Kataller Toyama	Gifu Nagaragawa Stadium
Wednesday 19:00	Nakashima 84'; Desmond 88'	Report	Nishikawa 41'; Seo 58'; Asuke (yellow card) 88'; Funatsu 90+2'	Attendance: 2,341; Referee: Yamamoto

21 April 2013 10	Tochigi	2–0	FC Gifu	Tochigi Green Stadium
Sunday 13:00	Kikuoka 45+3'; Cristiano 49'; Paulinho (yellow card) 89'; Santos (yellow card) 90+3'	Report	Moriyasu (yellow card) 43'; Mio (yellow card) 62'	Attendance: 2,103; Referee: Tsukada

28 April 2013 11	FC Gifu	1–1	Montedio Yamagata	Gifu Nagaragawa Stadium
Sunday 13:00	Someya (yellow card) 21'; Sugimoto 44'	Report	Akiba 42'; Kobayashi (yellow card) 77'	Attendance: 4,120; Referee: Kobota

3 May 2013 12	Gamba Osaka	2–0	FC Gifu	Osaka Expo '70 Stadium
Friday 19:00	Uchida (yellow card) 15'; Abe 23'; Hirai 89'	Report	Hattori (yellow card) 36'	Attendance: 12,729; Referee: Nishimura

6 May 2013 13	FC Gifu	0–1	JEF Chiba	Gifu Nagaragawa Stadium
Monday 19:00	Moriyasu (yellow card) 22'; Shibahara (yellow card) 43'; Desmond (yellow card) 86'	Report	Jair 86'	Attendance: 3,215; Referee: Mikami

12 May 2013 14	FC Gifu	0–0	Roasso Kumamoto	Gifu Nagaragawa Stadium
Sunday 19:00		Report	Hashimoto (yellow card) 90+4'	Attendance: 2,860; Referee: Noda

19 May 2013 15	Mito HollyHock	4–1	FC Gifu	K's denki Stadium Mito
Sunday 16:00	Suzuki 16' (yellow card) 78'; Yamamura 24'; Hashimoto 45+1'; Mishima (yellow card) 53'; Omoto 87'	Report	Sugiyama (yellow card) 45+1'; Someya 62'	Attendance: 2,851; Referee: Okabe

26 May 2013 16	Avispa Fukuoka	2–1	FC Gifu	Level-5 Stadium
Sunday 16:00	Tsutsumi (yellow card) 59'; Sakata 70'; Ishizu (yellow card) 73'; Nishida 86' (yellow card) 87'	Report	Hattori (yellow card) 54'; Moriyasu (yellow card) 46' (yellow-red card) 57'; Higuchi (yellow card) 69'; Tanaka 73'; Mio (yellow card) 88'	Attendance: 3,471; Referee: Araki

2 June 2013 17	FC Gifu	0–0	Fagiano Okayama	Gifu Nagaragawa Stadium
Sunday 19:00	Someya (yellow card) 80'	Report		Attendance: 2,665; Referee: Koya

8 June 2013 18	FC Gifu	2–1	V-Varen Nagasaki	Gifu Nagaragawa Stadium
Saturday 19:00	Masuyama (yellow card) 3'; Desmond (yellow card) 31' Someya 64' 90+4'; Hattori (yellow card) 69'	Report	Satō 5'	Attendance: 5,211; Referee: Kamimura

15 June 2013 19	Gainare Tottori	3–4	FC Gifu	Tottori Bank Bird Stadium
Saturday 18:30	Takeda 28'; Nagasato 42' 44'; Nagira (yellow card) 45+4'	Report	Tanaka 34'; Someya 45+5'; Sugiyama 79'; Higuchi 83'	Attendance: 3,941; Referee: Shinoto

22 June 2013 20	Consadole Sapporo	4–0	FC Gifu	Sapporo Dome
Saturday 14:00	Uchimura 19' 72'; Uesato (yellow card) 55'; Cho (yellow card) 71'; Yokono 69' 89'			Attendance: 5,464; Referee: Nakamura

29 June 2013 21	FC Gifu	3–1	Giravanz Kitakyushu	Gifu Nagaragawa Stadium
Saturday 19:00	Mizuno 4'; Desmond (yellow card) 36'; Someya 79' 88'	Report	Ikemoto 13' (yellow card) 87'; Kotegawa (yellow card) 38'; Fuji (yellow card) 73'; Arai (yellow card) 78'	Attendance: 4,801; Referee: Kubota

3 July 2013 22	FC Gifu	2–8	Gamba Osaka	Gifu Nagaragawa Stadium
Wednesday 19:00	Arai 35'; Higuchi (yellow card) 45+2' (goal) 77'	Report	Paulinho 2' 58'; Futagawa 8' 27'; Abe 45+2'; Konno 51' 63'; Kawanishi 69'	Attendance: 11,719; Referee: Yoshida

7 July 2013 23	Kyoto Sanga	2–0	FC Gifu	Nishikyogoku Athletic Stadium
Sunday 19:00	Yamase 22'; Sakai (yellow card) 68'; Mitsuhira 78'; Kudo (yellow card) 81'	Report	Hattori (yellow card) 10'	Attendance: 7,923; Referee: Kamimura

14 July 2013 24	Roasso Kumamoto	1–1	FC Gifu	Kumamoto Athletics Stadium
Sunday 19:00	Horigome 7' (yellow card) 23'; Nakama (yellow card) 25'; Goryo (yellow card) 69'; Yano (yellow card) 90+5'	Report	Moriyasu (yellow card) 69' (goal) 87'; Masuyama (yellow card) 89'	Attendance: 5,603; Referee: Oka

20 July 2013 25	FC Gifu	0–2	Avispa Fukuoka	Gifu Nagaragawa Stadium
Saturday 19:00	Hattori (yellow card) 48'; Vincent (yellow card) 60'; Someya (yellow card) 79'; Sugiyama (yellow card) 88'	Report	Sakata 13'; Ishizu (yellow card) 22'; Park Kun (yellow card) 31'; Kanakubo 63'	Attendance: 5,857; Referee: Noda

27 July 2013 26	Fagiano Okayama	1–2	FC Gifu	Kanko Stadium
Saturday 19:00	Kuwada 63'	Report	Nakamura 3'; Masuyama (yellow card) 38'; Higuchi (yellow card) 42' (goal) 67'; Nogaito (yellow card) 74'	Attendance: 7,807; Referee: Ikeuchi

4 August 2013 27	Tokushima Vortis	3–1	FC Gifu	Pocarisweat Stadium
Sunday 18:30	Kim 11'; Aoyama (yellow card) 27'; Tsuda (yellow card) 45+1'; Osaki 63'; Shibasaki 72'	Report	Hattori (yellow card) 4'; Tanaka (yellow card) 24'; Nakamura (yellow card) 34'; Sugiyama (yellow card) 64'; Desmond 90'	Attendance: 3,904; Referee: Hidaka

11 August 2013 28	FC Gifu	1–0	Vissel Kobe	Gifu Nagaragawa Stadium
Sunday 18:30	Kitani 42'; Blazhe (yellow card) 45'	Report	Lee (yellow card) 76'	Attendance: 5,118; Referee: Takayama

18 August 2013 29	FC Gifu	1–4	Mito HollyHock	Gifu Nagaragawa Stadium
Sunday 19:00	Arai (yellow card) 9'; Masuyama 46'; Sugiyama (yellow card) 54' (yellow-red card) 75'; Someya (yellow card) 90+2'; Nogaito (yellow card) 90+3'	Report	Hosokawa 24'; Suzuki 54'; Omoto 74'; Yamamura (red card) 76'; Mishima 90+4'	Attendance: 3,765; Referee: Ueda

21 August 2013 30	Giravanz Kitakyushu	2–0	FC Gifu	Honjō Athletic Stadium
Wednesday 19:00	Watari 21'; Ikemoto 90+4'; Kotegawa (yellow card) 90+4'	Report	Mizuno (yellow card) 32'; Blazhe (yellow card) 57'; Arai (yellow card) 59'; Kitani (yellow card) 81'	Attendance: 3,258; Referee: Koya

25 August 2013 31	JEF Chiba	1–1	FC Gifu	Fukuda Denshi Arena
Sunday 19:00	Yamaguchi 2' (yellow card) 78'; Yazawa (yellow card) 75'	Report	Someya (yellow card) 34'; Tanaka (yellow card) 57'; Masuyama 65'	Attendance: 10,065; Referee: Enomoto

1 September 2013 32	FC Gifu	1–2	Tokyo Verdy	Gifu Nagaragawa Stadium
Sunday 18:00	Tanaka (yellow card) 22'; Stipe 82'; Nogaito (yellow card) 90+1'		Maki 13'; Mori 16'Ishigami (yellow card) 85'; Tokiwa (yellow card) 87'	Attendance: 4,180

15 September 2013 33	Thespakusatsu Gunma	0–1	FC Gifu	Shikishima Stadium
Sunday 16:00	Hwang Song-Su (red card) 31'	Report	Blazhe 66'; Someya (yellow card) 76'; Higuchi (yellow card) 90+4'	Attendance: 2,310; Referee: Okabe

22 September 2013 34	FC Gifu	2–1	Gainare Tottori	Ogaki Asanaka Stadium
Sunday 13:00	Stipe Plazibat 21' 48'; Arai (yellow card) 23'; Someya (yellow card) 10' (yellow-red card) 63'	Report	Dudu 49'	Attendance: 3,369; Referee: Noda

6 October 2013 35	FC Gifu	1–2	Matsumoto Yamaga	Nagaragawa Stadium
Sunday 16:00	Blazhe 90+5'	Report	Shiozawa 58'; Murayama (yellow card) 74'; Iwakami 86'	Attendance: 8,036; Referee: Araki

20 October 2013 36	V-Varen Nagasaki	3–0	FC Gifu	Nagasaki Athletic Stadium
Sunday 13:00	Kanakubo 11'; Satō 61'; Kono 77'; Okuno (yellow card) 24' (yellow-red card) 85'	Report	Moriyasu (yellow card) 49'; Higuichi (yellow card) 66'	Attendance: 7,524; Referee: Imamura

23 October 2013 37	Yokohama FC	2–2	FC Gifu	Nippatsu Mitsuzawa Stadium
Wednesday 19:00	Kurotsu 37' 54'; Sato (yellow card) 69'; Nakajima (yellow card) 88'	Report	Mio (yellow card) 23'; Higuchi (yellow card) 42'; Someya 49'; Stipe 64'; Nakamura (yellow card) 27' (yellow-red card) 71'	Attendance: 2,139; Referee: Nagaya

27 October 2013 38	FC Gifu	0–1	Tochigi S.C.	Nagaragawa Stadium
Sunday 13:00	Arai (yellow card) 35'	Report	Kikuoka (yellow card) 37'; Cristiano 69'; Takagi (yellow card) 90+6'	Attendance: 3,830; Referee: Kawai

3 November 2013 39	Montedio Yamagata	2–2	FC Gifu	ND Soft Stadium Yamagata
Sunday 13:00	Yamazaki 40'; 50' (o.g.); Ito (yellow card) 57'	Report	Tanaka (yellow card) 14'; Someya 35'; Stipe 65'	Attendance: 5,869; Referee: Nakamura

10 November 2013 40	FC Gifu	1–1	Ehime	Nagaragawa Stadium
Sunday 16:00	Sugiyama (yellow card) 18'; Nogaito (yellow card) 29'; Nakamura (yellow card) 30'; Someya 54'; Blazhe (yellow card) 55' (yellow-red card) 62'	Report	Kato 40'	Attendance: 2,856; Referee: Inoue

17 November 2013 41	FC Gifu	0–3	Consadole Sapporo	Nagaragawa Stadium
Sunday 17:00	Arai (yellow card) 45'; Nakamura (yellow card) 85'	Report	Uehara 3'; Sunakawa (yellow card) 13'; Uchimura 17' 58'; Kawai (yellow card) 56'	Attendance: 7,015; Referee: Enomoto

24 November 2013 42	Kataller Toyama	1–2	FC Gifu	Toyama Athletic Stadium
Sunday 12:30	Seo Yong-Duk 6'; Funatsu (yellow card) 90+4'	Report	Blazhe (yellow card) 22'; 30' (o.g.); Tanaka (yellow card) 71'; Someya 85'	Attendance: 7,805; Referee: Ogiya

=== Emperor's Cup ===
8 September 2013 Second Round	Fagiano Okayama	2–1	FC Gifu	Kanko Stadium
14:00 JST (UTC+9)	Shimada 19'; Kondo 34'; Ishihara (yellow card) 56'	Report	Sekita (red card) 31'; Arai (yellow card) 88'

== Squad statistics ==
=== Appearances and goals ===
As of match played 24 November 2013

No.	Pos	Nat	Player	Total		J. League 2		Emperor's Cup	
No.	Pos	Nat	Player	Apps	Goals	Apps	Goals	Apps	Goals
1	GK	(Japan) JPN	Takahiro Takagi	13	0	13	0	0	0
2	DF	(Japan) JPN	Arata Sugiyama	34	1	31+2	1	1	0
3	DF	(Italy) ITA	Desmond	25	2	23+2	2	0	0
4	DF	(Japan) JPN	Shuto Tanaka	31	2	29+2	2	0	0
5	DF	(Japan) JPN	Hiroshi Sekita	11	0	9+1	0	1	0
6	MF	(Japan) JPN	Toshihiro Hattori	36	0	34+1	0	1	0
7	MF	(Japan) JPN	Hidemi Jinushizono	0	0	0	0	0	0
8	MF	(North Korea) PRK	Ri Han-Jae	12	0	9+3	0	0	0
10	MF	(Japan) JPN	Atsushi Mio	41	0	39+1	0	1	0
11	MF	(Japan) JPN	Kazuki Someya	38	11	36+1	10	1	1
14	FW	(Japan) JPN	Taira Inoue	3	0	3	0	0	0
15	MF	(Japan) JPN	Masato Yamazaki	7	0	5+2	0	0	0
16	MF	(Japan) JPN	Matazo Hirano	0	0	0	0	0	0
17	DF	(Japan) JPN	Shun Nogaito	34	0	28+5	0	1	0
18	FW	(Japan) JPN	Hiroyuki Sugimoto	5	0	2+3	0	0	0
19	MF	(Japan) JPN	Tsukasa Masuyama	41	2	38+3	2	0	0
20	DF	(Japan) JPN	Tatsuya Arai	29	3	19+9	3	0+1	0
21	GK	(Japan) JPN	Gakuji Ota	0	0	0	0	0	0
23	DF	(Japan) JPN	Hirofumi Moriyasu	30	1	24+5	1	1	0
24	DF	(Japan) JPN	Daiki Oizumi	6	0	5+1	0	0	0
25	MF	(Japan) JPN	Takumi Kiyomoto	9	0	0+9	0	0	0
26	FW	(Japan) JPN	Kohei Nakashima	10	1	1+9	1	0	0
27	FW	(Japan) JPN	Hiroki Higuchi	34	3	29+4	3	0+1	0
28	MF	(Japan) JPN	Taisuke Mizuno	10	1	7+3	1	0	0
29	MF	(Japan) JPN	Makoto Shibahara	16	0	9+6	0	1	0
30	FW	(Japan) JPN	Yuki Nakamura	9	1	9	1	0	0
31	GK	(Japan) JPN	Shogo Tokihisa	30	0	29	0	1	0
32	MF	(South Korea) KOR	Do Dong-Hyun	2	0	0+2	0	0	0
33	MF	(New Zealand) NZL	Kayne Vincent	6	0	1+5	0	0	0
34	FW	(North Macedonia) MKD	Blazhe	17	2	8+8	2	0+1	0
35	DF	(Japan) JPN	Kosuke Kitani	18	1	17	1	1	0
36	MF	(Croatia) CRO	Stipe Plazibat	14	5	7+6	5	1	0
Players who no longer play, or are out on loan, for FC Gifu but have made appearances this season:
9	FW	(Brazil) BRA	Fábio	5	0	1+4	0	0	0
22	MF	(Brazil) BRA	Daniel Lemos	3	0	0+3	0	0	0

=== Top scorers ===
Position	Nation	Number	Name	J. League Division 2	Emperor's Cup	Total
DF	(Japan)	20	Tatsuya Arai	3	0	3
DF	(Italy)	3	Desmond	2	0	2
FW	(Japan)	26	Kohei Nakashima	1	0	1
FW	(Japan)	18	Hiroyuki Sugimoto	1	0	1
MF	(Japan)	11	Kazuki Someya	10	1	11
DF	(Japan)	4	Shuto Tanaka	2	0	2
DF	(Japan)	2	Arata Sugiyama	1	0	1
FW	(Japan)	27	Hiroki Higuchi	3	0	3
MF	(Japan)	28	Taisuke Mizuno	1	0	1
MF	(Japan)	23	Hirofumi Moriyasu	1	0	1
FW	(Japan)	30	Yuki Nakamura	1	0	1
DF	(Japan)	35	Kosuke Kitani	1	0	1
MF	(Japan)	19	Tsukasa Masuyama	2	0	2
MF	(Croatia)	36	Stipe Plazibat	5	0	5
Fw	(North Macedonia)	34	Blazhe	2	0	2
			TOTALS	37	1	38

=== Disciplinary record ===
Number	Nation	Position	Name	J-League			Emperor's Cup			Total		
Number	Nation	Position	Name	Booked	(yellow card) (yellow-red card)	Sent off (straight red)	Booked	(yellow card) (yellow-red card)	Sent off (straight red)	Booked	(yellow card) (yellow-red card)	Sent off (straight red)
2	(Japan)	DF	Arata Sugiyama	5	1	0	0	0	0	5	1	0
3	(Italy)	DF	Desmond	4	1	0	0	0	0	4	1	0
4	(Japan)	DF	Shuto Tanaka	6	0	0	0	0	0	6	0	0
5	(Japan)	DF	Hiroshi Sekita	1	0	0	0	0	1	1	0	1
8	(North Korea)	MF	Ri Han-Jae	1	1	0	0	0	0	1	1	0
9	(Brazil)	FW	Fábio	0	1	0	0	0	0	0	1	0
11	(Japan)	MF	Kazuki Someya	7	1	0	0	0	0	7	1	0
23	(Japan)	DF	Hirofumi Moriyasu	4	1	0	0	0	0	4	1	0
10	(Japan)	MF	Atsushi Mio	3	0	0	0	0	0	3	0	0
29	(Japan)	MF	Makoto Shibahara	1	0	0	0	0	0	1	0	0
6	(Japan)	MF	Toshihiro Hattori	6	0	0	0	0	0	6	0	0
27	(Japan)	FW	Hiroki Higuchi	6	0	0	0	0	0	6	0	0
19	(Japan)	DF	Tsukasa Masuyama	3	0	0	0	0	0	3	0	0
33	(New Zealand)	FW	Kayne Vincent	1	0	0	0	0	0	1	0	0
17	(Japan)	DF	Shun Nogaito	5	0	0	0	0	0	5	0	0
30	(Japan)	FW	Yuki Nakamura	3	1	0	0	0	0	3	1	0
34	(North Macedonia)	FW	Blazhe	3	1	0	0	0	0	3	1	0
20	(Japan)	DF	Tatsuya Arai	5	0	0	1	0	0	6	0	0
28	(Japan)	MF	Taisuke Mizuno	1	0	0	0	0	0	1	0	0
35	(Japan)	DF	Kosuke Kitani	1	0	0	0	0	0	1	0	0
			TOTALS	62	8	0	1	0	1	63	8	1
