= List of Japanese football transfers summer 2013 =

This is a list of Japanese football transfers in the summer transfer window 2013 by club.

== J.League Division 1 ==
=== Albirex Niigata ===
In: Note: Flags indicate national team as defined under FIFA eligibility rules; some limited exceptions apply. Players may hold more than one non-FIFA nationality.

No.	Pos.	Nation	Player
11	MF	BRA	Roger Gaúcho (loan from (Brazil) Ponte Preta)
29	DF	JPN	Michael James Fitzgerald (loan return from V-Varen Nagasaki)

Out: Note: Flags indicate national team as defined under FIFA eligibility rules; some limited exceptions apply. Players may hold more than one non-FIFA nationality.

No.	Pos.	Nation	Player
11	FW	BRA	Bruno Lopes (loan return to (Brazil) Desportivo Brasil)
36	MF	JPN	Naoya Kikuchi (loan to Sagan Tosu)

=== Kashima Antlers ===
In: Note: Flags indicate national team as defined under FIFA eligibility rules; some limited exceptions apply. Players may hold more than one non-FIFA nationality.

No.	Pos.	Nation	Player

Out: Note: Flags indicate national team as defined under FIFA eligibility rules; some limited exceptions apply. Players may hold more than one non-FIFA nationality.

No.	Pos.	Nation	Player
16	MF	JPN	Takuya Honda (Transferred to Shimizu S-Pulse)
26	DF	JPN	Ryuga Suzuki (loan to JEF United Chiba)

=== Omiya Ardija ===
In: Note: Flags indicate national team as defined under FIFA eligibility rules; some limited exceptions apply. Players may hold more than one non-FIFA nationality.

No.	Pos.	Nation	Player
20	MF	JPN	Takuya Wada (Transferred from Vegalta Sendai)
22	DF	AUS	Lucas Neill (Transferred from Sydney FC)

Out: Note: Flags indicate national team as defined under FIFA eligibility rules; some limited exceptions apply. Players may hold more than one non-FIFA nationality.

No.	Pos.	Nation	Player
5	MF	BRA	Carlinhos (loan to Júbilo Iwata)
14	FW	JPN	Shintaro Shimizu (loan to Fagiano Okayama)

=== Shonan Bellmare ===
In Note: Flags indicate national team as defined under FIFA eligibility rules; some limited exceptions apply. Players may hold more than one non-FIFA nationality.

No.	Pos.	Nation	Player
16	FW	BRA	Wellington (Transferred from (Brazil) Esporte Clube Pelotas)
38	GK	BRA	Alex Santana (loan from (Brazil) Comercial)
40	MF	JPN	Yohei Otake (loan from FC Tokyo)
—	FW	MKD	Stevo (Transferred from (South Korea) Suwon Samsung Bluewings)

Out Note: Flags indicate national team as defined under FIFA eligibility rules; some limited exceptions apply. Players may hold more than one non-FIFA nationality.

No.	Pos.	Nation	Player
9	FW	BRA	Thiago Quirino (loan to (United Arab Emirates) Al-Shaab CSC)
15	MF	JPN	Yuzo Iwakami (loan to Matsumoto Yamaga)
16	FW	BOL	Edivaldo (loan return to (Thailand) Muangthong United F.C.)
29	FW	JPN	Ryohei Yoshihama (loan to Fukushima United)
32	DF	KOR	Kweon Han-Jin (loan return to Kashiwa Reysol)

=== Cerezo Osaka ===
In: Note: Flags indicate national team as defined under FIFA eligibility rules; some limited exceptions apply. Players may hold more than one non-FIFA nationality.

No.	Pos.	Nation	Player
22	GK	JPN	Daisuke Tada (Free Agent)

Out: Note: Flags indicate national team as defined under FIFA eligibility rules; some limited exceptions apply. Players may hold more than one non-FIFA nationality.

No.	Pos.	Nation	Player
11	FW	JPN	Ryūji Bando (loan to Sagan Tosu)
28	MF	JPN	Shota Inoue (loan to Giravanz Kitakyushu)
32	MF	JPN	Takeru Okada (loan to A.C. Nagano Parceiro)

=== Yokohama F. Marinos ===
In: Note: Flags indicate national team as defined under FIFA eligibility rules; some limited exceptions apply. Players may hold more than one non-FIFA nationality.

No.	Pos.	Nation	Player

Out: Note: Flags indicate national team as defined under FIFA eligibility rules; some limited exceptions apply. Players may hold more than one non-FIFA nationality.

No.	Pos.	Nation	Player

=== Kawasaki Frontale ===
In Note: Flags indicate national team as defined under FIFA eligibility rules; some limited exceptions apply. Players may hold more than one non-FIFA nationality.

No.	Pos.	Nation	Player
18	FW	BRA	Alan Pinheiro (loan from (Brazil) Vitória)
28	DF	BRA	Robson (loan from (Brazil) Bahia)

Out Note: Flags indicate national team as defined under FIFA eligibility rules; some limited exceptions apply. Players may hold more than one non-FIFA nationality.

No.	Pos.	Nation	Player
18	FW	BRA	Patric (loan return to (Brazil) Salgueiro)
26	FW	JPN	Koya Tanio (loan to Gainare Tottori)

=== Nagoya Grampus ===
In: Note: Flags indicate national team as defined under FIFA eligibility rules; some limited exceptions apply. Players may hold more than one non-FIFA nationality.

No.	Pos.	Nation	Player
18	FW	JPN	Kensuke Nagai (loan from (Belgium) Standard Liège)

Out: Note: Flags indicate national team as defined under FIFA eligibility rules; some limited exceptions apply. Players may hold more than one non-FIFA nationality.

No.	Pos.	Nation	Player
30	MF	JPN	Taisuke Mizuno (loan to FC Gifu)

=== Júbilo Iwata ===
In: Note: Flags indicate national team as defined under FIFA eligibility rules; some limited exceptions apply. Players may hold more than one non-FIFA nationality.

No.	Pos.	Nation	Player
50	MF	BRA	Carlinhos (loan from Omiya Ardija)

Out: Note: Flags indicate national team as defined under FIFA eligibility rules; some limited exceptions apply. Players may hold more than one non-FIFA nationality.

No.	Pos.	Nation	Player

=== Urawa Red Diamonds ===
In Note: Flags indicate national team as defined under FIFA eligibility rules; some limited exceptions apply. Players may hold more than one non-FIFA nationality.

No.	Pos.	Nation	Player

Out Note: Flags indicate national team as defined under FIFA eligibility rules; some limited exceptions apply. Players may hold more than one non-FIFA nationality.

No.	Pos.	Nation	Player
21	FW	SRB	Ranko Despotović (Released)
28	DF	JPN	Takuya Okamoto (loan to V-Varen Nagasaki)

=== Kashiwa Reysol ===
In Note: Flags indicate national team as defined under FIFA eligibility rules; some limited exceptions apply. Players may hold more than one non-FIFA nationality.

No.	Pos.	Nation	Player

Out Note: Flags indicate national team as defined under FIFA eligibility rules; some limited exceptions apply. Players may hold more than one non-FIFA nationality.

No.	Pos.	Nation	Player
—	DF	KOR	Kweon Han-Jin (loan to Thespa Kusatsu, previously on loan at Shonan Bellmare)

=== Shimizu S-Pulse ===
In: Note: Flags indicate national team as defined under FIFA eligibility rules; some limited exceptions apply. Players may hold more than one non-FIFA nationality.

No.	Pos.	Nation	Player
35	MF	JPN	Kazuya Murata (Free Agent)
38	MF	JPN	Takuya Honda (Transferred from Kashima Antlers)
39	FW	MNE	Dženan Radončić (loan from (South Korea) Suwon Samsung Bluewings)
50	FW	JPN	Genki Omae (loan from (Germany) Fortuna Düsseldorf)

Out: Note: Flags indicate national team as defined under FIFA eligibility rules; some limited exceptions apply. Players may hold more than one non-FIFA nationality.

No.	Pos.	Nation	Player
1	GK	JPN	Akihiro Hayashi (loan to Sagan Tosu)
9	FW	BRA	Baré (Transferred to (China) Tianjin Teda)
15	FW	JPN	Hiroki Higuchi (loan to FC Gifu)
23	FW	JPN	Ryohei Shirasaki (loan to Kataller Toyama)
24	MF	JPN	Makoto Shibahara (loan to FC Gifu)
25	DF	JPN	Tomoya Inukai (loan to Matsumoto Yamaga)
26	FW	JPN	Satoru Kashiwase (loan to (United States) New York Cosmos)

=== Sagan Tosu ===
In Note: Flags indicate national team as defined under FIFA eligibility rules; some limited exceptions apply. Players may hold more than one non-FIFA nationality.

No.	Pos.	Nation	Player
9	FW	JPN	Ryūji Bando (loan from Cerezo Osaka)
16	DF	BRA	Nilson (loan from (Brazil) Metropolitano)
33	GK	JPN	Akihiro Hayashi (loan from Shimizu S-Pulse)
36	MF	JPN	Naoya Kikuchi (loan from Albirex Niigata)

Out Note: Flags indicate national team as defined under FIFA eligibility rules; some limited exceptions apply. Players may hold more than one non-FIFA nationality.

No.	Pos.	Nation	Player
2	DF	JPN	Kosuke Kitani (loan to FC Gifu)
7	MF	JPN	Keisuke Funatani (loan to Mito HollyHock)
9	FW	BRA	Roni (Released)

=== Sanfrecce Hiroshima ===
In Note: Flags indicate national team as defined under FIFA eligibility rules; some limited exceptions apply. Players may hold more than one non-FIFA nationality.

No.	Pos.	Nation	Player

Out Note: Flags indicate national team as defined under FIFA eligibility rules; some limited exceptions apply. Players may hold more than one non-FIFA nationality.

No.	Pos.	Nation	Player
20	MF	JPN	Hironori Ishikawa (loan to Vegalta Sendai)
23	MF	JPN	Kota Sameshima (loan to Gainare Tottori)

=== Oita Trinita ===
In Note: Flags indicate national team as defined under FIFA eligibility rules; some limited exceptions apply. Players may hold more than one non-FIFA nationality.

No.	Pos.	Nation	Player
31	GK	JPN	Naoto Kamifukumoto (loan return from F.C. Machida Zelvia)
49	MF	JPN	Yohei Kajiyama (loan from FC Tokyo)

Out Note: Flags indicate national team as defined under FIFA eligibility rules; some limited exceptions apply. Players may hold more than one non-FIFA nationality.

No.	Pos.	Nation	Player
9	FW	JPN	Rui Komatsu (loan to V-Varen Nagasaki)
25	GK	KOR	Kim Yeong-Gi (loan to Avispa Fukuoka)

=== FC Tokyo ===
In Note: Flags indicate national team as defined under FIFA eligibility rules; some limited exceptions apply. Players may hold more than one non-FIFA nationality.

No.	Pos.	Nation	Player
10	MF	JPN	Yohei Kajiyama (loan return from (Greece) Panathinaikos F.C.)

Out Note: Flags indicate national team as defined under FIFA eligibility rules; some limited exceptions apply. Players may hold more than one non-FIFA nationality.

No.	Pos.	Nation	Player
11	FW	JPN	Tadanari Lee (loan return to (England) Southampton F.C.)
27	MF	JPN	Sotan Tanabe (loan to (Spain) CE Sabadell FC)
37	MF	JPN	Kento Hashimoto (loan to Roasso Kumamoto)

=== Ventforet Kofu ===
In Note: Flags indicate national team as defined under FIFA eligibility rules; some limited exceptions apply. Players may hold more than one non-FIFA nationality.

No.	Pos.	Nation	Player
9	FW	BRA	Gilsinho (Transferred from (Brazil) Sport Recife)
11	FW	BRA	Patric (loan from (Brazil) Salgueiro)

Out Note: Flags indicate national team as defined under FIFA eligibility rules; some limited exceptions apply. Players may hold more than one non-FIFA nationality.

No.	Pos.	Nation	Player
9	FW	PAR	José Ortigoza (Released)
11	FW	BRA	Hugo (Released)
23	DF	JPN	Makoto Rindo (loan to Gainare Tottori)
24	MF	JPN	Yuki Horigome (loan to Roasso Kumamoto)

=== Vegalta Sendai ===
In Note: Flags indicate national team as defined under FIFA eligibility rules; some limited exceptions apply. Players may hold more than one non-FIFA nationality.

No.	Pos.	Nation	Player

Out Note: Flags indicate national team as defined under FIFA eligibility rules; some limited exceptions apply. Players may hold more than one non-FIFA nationality.

No.	Pos.	Nation	Player
4	DF	JPN	Toshio Shimakawa (loan to Blaublitz Akita)
7	MF	JPN	Hiroaki Okuno (loan to V-Varen Nagasaki)

== J.League Division 2 ==
=== Avispa Fukuoka ===
In Note: Flags indicate national team as defined under FIFA eligibility rules; some limited exceptions apply. Players may hold more than one non-FIFA nationality.

No.	Pos.	Nation	Player
17	MF	JPN	Christopher Tatsuki Kinjo (Free Agent)

Out Note: Flags indicate national team as defined under FIFA eligibility rules; some limited exceptions apply. Players may hold more than one non-FIFA nationality.

No.	Pos.	Nation	Player

=== Consadole Sapporo ===
In Note: Flags indicate national team as defined under FIFA eligibility rules; some limited exceptions apply. Players may hold more than one non-FIFA nationality.

No.	Pos.	Nation	Player
19	FW	VIE	Lê Công Vinh (loan from (Vietnam) Sông Lam Nghệ An)
35	FW	BRA	Ferro (Free Agent)

Out Note: Flags indicate national team as defined under FIFA eligibility rules; some limited exceptions apply. Players may hold more than one non-FIFA nationality.

No.	Pos.	Nation	Player
19	FW	BRA	Tele (Released)
29	DF	JPN	Yuto Nagasaka (loan to (Thailand) Khonkaen F.C.)
32	MF	JPN	Shogo Nakahara (loan to (Thailand) Khonkaen F.C.)

=== Ehime FC ===
In Note: Flags indicate national team as defined under FIFA eligibility rules; some limited exceptions apply. Players may hold more than one non-FIFA nationality.

No.	Pos.	Nation	Player

Out Note: Flags indicate national team as defined under FIFA eligibility rules; some limited exceptions apply. Players may hold more than one non-FIFA nationality.

No.	Pos.	Nation	Player

=== Fagiano Okayama ===
In Note: Flags indicate national team as defined under FIFA eligibility rules; some limited exceptions apply. Players may hold more than one non-FIFA nationality.

No.	Pos.	Nation	Player

Out Note: Flags indicate national team as defined under FIFA eligibility rules; some limited exceptions apply. Players may hold more than one non-FIFA nationality.

No.	Pos.	Nation	Player
30	MF	KOR	Lee Jae-Gwan (Released)

=== Gainare Tottori ===
In: Note: Flags indicate national team as defined under FIFA eligibility rules; some limited exceptions apply. Players may hold more than one non-FIFA nationality.

No.	Pos.	Nation	Player
6	DF	BRA	Dudu (loan from Metropolitano)
28	DF	JPN	Makoto Rindo (loan from Ventforet Kofu)
31	MF	JPN	Kota Sameshima (loan from Sanfrecce Hiroshima)

Out: Note: Flags indicate national team as defined under FIFA eligibility rules; some limited exceptions apply. Players may hold more than one non-FIFA nationality.

No.	Pos.	Nation	Player
6	DF	BRA	Rafael (Released)
8	MF	BRA	Reginaldo (Released)

=== Gamba Osaka ===
In: Note: Flags indicate national team as defined under FIFA eligibility rules; some limited exceptions apply. Players may hold more than one non-FIFA nationality.

No.	Pos.	Nation	Player
9	FW	BRA	Rocha (Transferred from (Romania) Steaua București)
39	MF	JPN	Takashi Usami (loan return from (Germany) 1899 Hoffenheim)

Out: Note: Flags indicate national team as defined under FIFA eligibility rules; some limited exceptions apply. Players may hold more than one non-FIFA nationality.

No.	Pos.	Nation	Player
9	FW	BRA	Leandro (loan return to (Qatar) Al-Sadd)
41	MF	JPN	Akihiro Ienaga (loan return to (Spain) RCD Mallorca)

=== FC Gifu ===
In Note: Flags indicate national team as defined under FIFA eligibility rules; some limited exceptions apply. Players may hold more than one non-FIFA nationality.

No.	Pos.	Nation	Player
27	FW	JPN	Hiroki Higuchi (loan from Shimizu S-Pulse)
28	MF	JPN	Taisuke Mizuno (loan from Nagoya Grampus)
29	MF	JPN	Makoto Shibahara (loan from Shimizu S-Pulse)

Out Note: Flags indicate national team as defined under FIFA eligibility rules; some limited exceptions apply. Players may hold more than one non-FIFA nationality.

No.	Pos.	Nation	Player

=== Giravanz Kitakyushu ===
In Note: Flags indicate national team as defined under FIFA eligibility rules; some limited exceptions apply. Players may hold more than one non-FIFA nationality.

No.	Pos.	Nation	Player
29	MF	JPN	Shota Inoue (loan from Cerezo Osaka)

Out Note: Flags indicate national team as defined under FIFA eligibility rules; some limited exceptions apply. Players may hold more than one non-FIFA nationality.

No.	Pos.	Nation	Player

=== Mito HollyHock ===
In Note: Flags indicate national team as defined under FIFA eligibility rules; some limited exceptions apply. Players may hold more than one non-FIFA nationality.

No.	Pos.	Nation	Player

Out Note: Flags indicate national team as defined under FIFA eligibility rules; some limited exceptions apply. Players may hold more than one non-FIFA nationality.

No.	Pos.	Nation	Player

=== JEF United Chiba ===
In Note: Flags indicate national team as defined under FIFA eligibility rules; some limited exceptions apply. Players may hold more than one non-FIFA nationality.

No.	Pos.	Nation	Player
27	DF	JPN	Ryuga Suzuki (loan from Kashima Antlers)

Out Note: Flags indicate national team as defined under FIFA eligibility rules; some limited exceptions apply. Players may hold more than one non-FIFA nationality.

No.	Pos.	Nation	Player

=== Kataller Toyama ===
In Note: Flags indicate national team as defined under FIFA eligibility rules; some limited exceptions apply. Players may hold more than one non-FIFA nationality.

No.	Pos.	Nation	Player

Out Note: Flags indicate national team as defined under FIFA eligibility rules; some limited exceptions apply. Players may hold more than one non-FIFA nationality.

No.	Pos.	Nation	Player

=== Montedio Yamagata ===
In Note: Flags indicate national team as defined under FIFA eligibility rules; some limited exceptions apply. Players may hold more than one non-FIFA nationality.

No.	Pos.	Nation	Player

Out Note: Flags indicate national team as defined under FIFA eligibility rules; some limited exceptions apply. Players may hold more than one non-FIFA nationality.

No.	Pos.	Nation	Player

=== Roasso Kumamoto ===
In Note: Flags indicate national team as defined under FIFA eligibility rules; some limited exceptions apply. Players may hold more than one non-FIFA nationality.

No.	Pos.	Nation	Player
27	DF	KOR	Ro Hyung-Gu (Transferred from (South Korea) Suwon Samsung Bluewings)
28	MF	JPN	Yuki Horigome (loan from Ventforet Kofu)
38	MF	JPN	Kento Hashimoto (loan from FC Tokyo)

Out Note: Flags indicate national team as defined under FIFA eligibility rules; some limited exceptions apply. Players may hold more than one non-FIFA nationality.

No.	Pos.	Nation	Player

=== Kyoto Sanga FC ===
In Note: Flags indicate national team as defined under FIFA eligibility rules; some limited exceptions apply. Players may hold more than one non-FIFA nationality.

No.	Pos.	Nation	Player

Out Note: Flags indicate national team as defined under FIFA eligibility rules; some limited exceptions apply. Players may hold more than one non-FIFA nationality.

No.	Pos.	Nation	Player
31	FW	JPN	Yuya Kubo (Transferred to (Switzerland) BSC Young Boys)
32	DF	JPN	Ryusei Saito (loan to Sagawa Printing S.C.)

=== Thespa Kusatsu ===
In Note: Flags indicate national team as defined under FIFA eligibility rules; some limited exceptions apply. Players may hold more than one non-FIFA nationality.

No.	Pos.	Nation	Player
—	DF	KOR	Kweon Han-Jin (loan from Kashiwa Reysol)

Out Note: Flags indicate national team as defined under FIFA eligibility rules; some limited exceptions apply. Players may hold more than one non-FIFA nationality.

No.	Pos.	Nation	Player

=== Tochigi SC ===
In Note: Flags indicate national team as defined under FIFA eligibility rules; some limited exceptions apply. Players may hold more than one non-FIFA nationality.

No.	Pos.	Nation	Player

Out Note: Flags indicate national team as defined under FIFA eligibility rules; some limited exceptions apply. Players may hold more than one non-FIFA nationality.

No.	Pos.	Nation	Player

=== Tokyo Verdy ===
In Note: Flags indicate national team as defined under FIFA eligibility rules; some limited exceptions apply. Players may hold more than one non-FIFA nationality.

No.	Pos.	Nation	Player
21	FW	JPN	Daisuke Takagi (Promoted from youth team)

Out Note: Flags indicate national team as defined under FIFA eligibility rules; some limited exceptions apply. Players may hold more than one non-FIFA nationality.

No.	Pos.	Nation	Player
29	DF	BRA	Nicollas (loan return to (Brazil) Flamengo)

=== Tokushima Vortis ===
In Note: Flags indicate national team as defined under FIFA eligibility rules; some limited exceptions apply. Players may hold more than one non-FIFA nationality.

No.	Pos.	Nation	Player

Out Note: Flags indicate national team as defined under FIFA eligibility rules; some limited exceptions apply. Players may hold more than one non-FIFA nationality.

No.	Pos.	Nation	Player

=== Matsumoto Yamaga ===
In Note: Flags indicate national team as defined under FIFA eligibility rules; some limited exceptions apply. Players may hold more than one non-FIFA nationality.

No.	Pos.	Nation	Player
13	DF	JPN	Tomoya Inukai (loan from Shimizu S-Pulse)

Out Note: Flags indicate national team as defined under FIFA eligibility rules; some limited exceptions apply. Players may hold more than one non-FIFA nationality.

No.	Pos.	Nation	Player

=== Vissel Kobe ===
In: Note: Flags indicate national team as defined under FIFA eligibility rules; some limited exceptions apply. Players may hold more than one non-FIFA nationality.

No.	Pos.	Nation	Player
34	DF	KOR	Gang Yoon-Goo (Drafted from (South Korea) Dong-A University)

Out: Note: Flags indicate national team as defined under FIFA eligibility rules; some limited exceptions apply. Players may hold more than one non-FIFA nationality.

No.	Pos.	Nation	Player

=== V-Varen Nagasaki ===
In Note: Flags indicate national team as defined under FIFA eligibility rules; some limited exceptions apply. Players may hold more than one non-FIFA nationality.

No.	Pos.	Nation	Player
27	DF	KOR	Cho Min-Woo (loan from (South Korea) FC Seoul)

Out Note: Flags indicate national team as defined under FIFA eligibility rules; some limited exceptions apply. Players may hold more than one non-FIFA nationality.

No.	Pos.	Nation	Player

=== Yokohama FC ===
In Note: Flags indicate national team as defined under FIFA eligibility rules; some limited exceptions apply. Players may hold more than one non-FIFA nationality.

No.	Pos.	Nation	Player

Out Note: Flags indicate national team as defined under FIFA eligibility rules; some limited exceptions apply. Players may hold more than one non-FIFA nationality.

No.	Pos.	Nation	Player
10	FW	BRA	Kaio (Transferred to (United Arab Emirates) Al Wasl FC)
20	DF	KOR	Park Tae-Hong (loan to Yokohama FC Hong Kong)
