= Tsukasa Masuyama =

Japanese footballer (born 1990)

Tsukasa Masuyama 益山 司
Personal information
- Date of birth: January 25, 1990 (age 36)
- Place of birth: Minokamo, Gifu, Japan
- Height: 1.80 m (5 ft 11 in)
- Position: Midfielder

Senior career*
Years	Team	Apps	(Gls)
2008–2011	JEF United Chiba	7	(0)
2010	→Oita Trinita (loan)	11	(0)
2012	Matsumoto Yamaga FC	1	(0)
2013–2016	FC Gifu	114	(5)
Total		133	(5)
- * Club domestic league appearances and goals

Tsukasa Masuyama (益山 司, Masuyama Tsukasa; born January 25, 1990) is a former Japanese football player.

== Club career ==
Masuyama was born in Minokamo on January 25, 1990. After graduating from high school, he joined JEF United Chiba in 2008. However he could hardly play in the match, he moved to Oita Trinita in August 2010. He returned to JEF United in 2011 and he moved to Matsumoto Yamaga FC in 2012. He moved to his local club FC Gifu in 2013. He became a regular player as defensive midfielder. His opportunity to play decreased in 2016 and he retired end of 2016 season.

== National team career ==
In August 2007, Masuyama was elected Japan U-17 national team for 2007 U-17 World Cup, but he did not play in the match.

== Career statistics ==
Appearances and goals by club, season and competition
Club	Season	League			Emperor's Cup		J.League Cup		Total	
Club	Season	Division	Apps	Goals	Apps	Goals	Apps	Goals	Apps	Goals
JEF United Chiba	2008	J1 League	1	0	1	0	1	0	3	0
JEF United Chiba	2009	J1 League	5	0	0	0	1	0	6	0
JEF United Chiba	2010	J2 League	1	0	0	0	—		1	0
Oita Trinita	2010	J2 League	11	0	1	0	—		12	0
JEF United Chiba	2011	J2 League	0	0	1	0	—		1	0
Matsumoto Yamaga FC	2012	J2 League	1	0	0	0	—		1	0
FC Gifu	2013	J2 League	41	2	0	0	—		41	2
FC Gifu	2014	J2 League	29	3	1	0	—		30	3
FC Gifu	2015	J2 League	32	0	1	0	—		33	0
FC Gifu	2016	J2 League	12	0	1	0	—		13	0
Career total			134	5	6	0	2	0	142	2
