= Takahiro Takagi =

Japanese footballer

Takahiro Takagi 高木 貴弘
Personal information
- Full name: Takahiro Takagi
- Date of birth: July 1, 1982 (age 44)
- Place of birth: Kanazawa, Ishikawa, Japan
- Height: 1.85 m (6 ft 1 in)
- Position: Goalkeeper

Youth career
- 1998–2000: JEF United Ichihara

Senior career*
Years	Team	Apps	(Gls)
2001–2003	JEF United Ichihara	0	(0)
2003	Thespa Kusatsu	1	(0)
2004–2009	Omiya Ardija	0	(0)
2006	→Thespa Kusatsu (loan)	48	(0)
2007–2008	→Consadole Sapporo (loan)	67	(0)
2010	Albirex Niigata	0	(0)
2011–2012	Consadole Sapporo	5	(0)
2013–2014	FC Gifu	13	(0)
2015	SC Sagamihara	0	(0)
Total		133	(0)
- * Club domestic league appearances and goals

Takahiro Takagi (高木 貴弘, Takagi Takahiro; born July 1, 1982) is a former Japanese football player.

== Playing career ==
Takagi was born in Kanazawa on July 1, 1982. He joined J1 League club JEF United Ichihara from youth team in 2001. However he could not play at all in the match behind Ryo Kushino until 2003. In October 2003, he moved to Regional Leagues club Thespa Kusatsu. In 2004, he moved to J2 League club Omiya Ardija. However he could not play at all in the match behind Hiroki Aratani. In 2006, he moved to J2 club Thespa Kusatsu again on loan. He became a regular goalkeeper and played full time in all 48 matches. In 2007, he moved to J2 club Consadole Sapporo on loan. He player as regular goalkeeper and the club won the champions in 2007 and was promoted to J1 from 2008. In 2008, he battles with Yuya Sato for the position and played many matches. However the club finished at bottom place and was relegated to J2 in a year. In 2009, he returned to J1 club Omiya Ardija. However he could hardly play in the match behind Koji Ezumi. In 2010, he moved to J1 club Albirex Niigata. However he could not play at all in the match behind Masaaki Higashiguchi and Takaya Kurokawa. In 2011, he moved to J2 club Consadole Sapporo again. However he could hardly play in the match behind Lee Ho-seung in 2011. Although the club was promoted to J1 from 2012, he could hardly play in the match and the club was relegated to J2 in a year. In 2013, he moved to J2 club FC Gifu. Although he battles with Shogo Tokihisa for the position and played many matches in 2013, he could not play at all in the match behind new member Yoshikatsu Kawaguchi in 2014. In 2015, he moved to J3 League club SC Sagamihara. However he could not play at all in the match behind Tsuyoshi Sato and retired end of 2015 season.

== Club statistics ==
Club performance			League		Cup		League Cup		Total	
Season	Club	League	Apps	Goals	Apps	Goals	Apps	Goals	Apps	Goals
Japan			League		Emperor's Cup		J.League Cup		Total	
2001	JEF United Ichihara	J1 League	0	0	0	0	0	0	0	0
2002	JEF United Ichihara	J1 League	0	0	0	0	0	0	0	0
2003	JEF United Ichihara	J1 League	0	0	0	0	0	0	0	0
2003	Thespa Kusatsu	Regional Leagues	1	0	0	0	-		1	0
2004	Omiya Ardija	J2 League	0	0	0	0	-		0	0
2005	Omiya Ardija	J1 League	0	0	0	0	0	0	0	0
2006	Thespa Kusatsu	J2 League	48	0	2	0	-		50	0
2007	Consadole Sapporo	J2 League	47	0	0	0	-		47	0
2008	Consadole Sapporo	J1 League	20	0	0	0	1	0	21	0
2009	Omiya Ardija	J1 League	0	0	0	0	5	0	5	0
2010	Albirex Niigata	J1 League	0	0	0	0	0	0	0	0
2011	Consadole Sapporo	J2 League	2	0	1	0	-		3	0
2012	Consadole Sapporo	J1 League	3	0	0	0	3	0	6	0
2013	FC Gifu	J2 League	13	0	0	0	-		13	0
2014	FC Gifu	J2 League	0	0	0	0	-		0	0
2015	SC Sagamihara	J3 League	0	0	-		-		0	0
Career total			134	0	3	0	9	0	146	0
