= 2017 FC Gifu season =

FC Gifu
2017 season
- Manager: Takeshi Oki
- Stadium: Gifu Nagaragawa Stadium
- J2 League: 18th

2017 FC Gifu season.

== J2 League ==
=== League table ===
Pos	Team	Pld	W	D	L	GF	GA	GD	Pts
17	Zweigen Kanazawa	42	13	10	19	49	67	−18	49
18	FC Gifu	42	11	13	18	56	68	−12	46
19	Kamatamare Sanuki	42	8	14	20	41	61	−20	38

Updated to match(es) played on 28 November 2017. Source: 2017 MEIJI YASUDA J2 LEAGUE League table
Rules for classification: 1) Points; 2) Goal difference; 3) Goals scored

=== Match details ===
J2 League match details
Match	Date	Team	Score	Team	Venue	Attendance
1	2017.02.26	FC Gifu	2-2	Renofa Yamaguchi FC	Gifu Nagaragawa Stadium	6,587
2	2017.03.04	Nagoya Grampus	1-1	FC Gifu	Toyota Stadium	21,878
3	2017.03.12	FC Gifu	0-1	Matsumoto Yamaga FC	Gifu Nagaragawa Stadium	9,044
4	2017.03.19	FC Gifu	1-2	Yokohama FC	Gifu Nagaragawa Stadium	11,040
5	2017.03.25	Tokyo Verdy	1-0	FC Gifu	Ajinomoto Stadium	3,331
6	2017.04.01	FC Machida Zelvia	0-1	FC Gifu	Machida Stadium	2,819
7	2017.04.08	FC Gifu	2-1	Mito HollyHock	Gifu Nagaragawa Stadium	4,536
8	2017.04.15	Shonan Bellmare	3-3	FC Gifu	Shonan BMW Stadium Hiratsuka	7,375
9	2017.04.23	Kamatamare Sanuki	1-3	FC Gifu	Pikara Stadium	3,006
10	2017.04.29	FC Gifu	1-0	Zweigen Kanazawa	Gifu Nagaragawa Stadium	7,066
11	2017.05.03	Thespakusatsu Gunma	0-2	FC Gifu	Shoda Shoyu Stadium Gunma	3,058
12	2017.05.07	FC Gifu	1-2	Oita Trinita	Gifu Nagaragawa Stadium	7,008
13	2017.05.13	Tokushima Vortis	1-1	FC Gifu	Pocarisweat Stadium	3,762
14	2017.05.17	FC Gifu	1-2	Roasso Kumamoto	Gifu Nagaragawa Stadium	3,650
15	2017.05.21	FC Gifu	4-4	V-Varen Nagasaki	Gifu Nagaragawa Stadium	4,475
16	2017.05.27	Kyoto Sanga FC	1-1	FC Gifu	Kyoto Nishikyogoku Athletic Stadium	8,100
17	2017.06.03	FC Gifu	1-1	Montedio Yamagata	Gifu Nagaragawa Stadium	11,364
18	2017.06.11	Ehime FC	2-0	FC Gifu	Ningineer Stadium	2,885
19	2017.06.17	Fagiano Okayama	1-1	FC Gifu	City Light Stadium	8,855
20	2017.06.25	FC Gifu	4-6	JEF United Chiba	Gifu Nagaragawa Stadium	4,521
21	2017.07.01	Avispa Fukuoka	1-0	FC Gifu	Level5 Stadium	8,858
22	2017.07.09	FC Gifu	3-2	Kyoto Sanga FC	Gifu Nagaragawa Stadium	6,356
23	2017.07.15	Yokohama FC	1-0	FC Gifu	NHK Spring Mitsuzawa Football Stadium	4,455
24	2017.07.22	FC Gifu	0-2	FC Machida Zelvia	Gifu Nagaragawa Stadium	6,043
25	2017.07.30	FC Gifu	2-0	Thespakusatsu Gunma	Gifu Nagaragawa Stadium	4,629
26	2017.08.05	V-Varen Nagasaki	2-1	FC Gifu	Transcosmos Stadium Nagasaki	4,355
27	2017.08.11	FC Gifu	1-1	Fagiano Okayama	Gifu Nagaragawa Stadium	5,872
28	2017.08.16	Roasso Kumamoto	0-0	FC Gifu	Egao Kenko Stadium	4,188
29	2017.08.20	FC Gifu	0-1	Kamatamare Sanuki	Gifu Nagaragawa Stadium	5,301
30	2017.08.26	JEF United Chiba	1-3	FC Gifu	Fukuda Denshi Arena	7,900
31	2017.09.03	FC Gifu	2-1	Ehime FC	Gifu Nagaragawa Stadium	6,712
32	2017.09.09	Mito HollyHock	1-2	FC Gifu	K's denki Stadium Mito	4,595
33	2017.09.16	Renofa Yamaguchi FC	0-1	FC Gifu	Ishin Memorial Park Stadium	3,646
34	2017.09.24	FC Gifu	1-2	Avispa Fukuoka	Gifu Nagaragawa Stadium	7,348
35	2017.10.01	FC Gifu	2-6	Nagoya Grampus	Gifu Nagaragawa Stadium	17,027
36	2017.10.08	Oita Trinita	3-3	FC Gifu	Oita Bank Dome	7,121
37	2017.10.14	FC Gifu	0-2	Tokushima Vortis	Gifu Nagaragawa Stadium	5,359
38	2017.10.21	FC Gifu	1-2	Tokyo Verdy	Gifu Nagaragawa Stadium	4,330
39	2017.10.29	Matsumoto Yamaga FC	2-1	FC Gifu	Matsumotodaira Park Stadium	8,982
40	2017.11.05	Zweigen Kanazawa	1-1	FC Gifu	Ishikawa Athletics Stadium	5,567
41	2017.11.11	FC Gifu	1-1	Shonan Bellmare	Gifu Nagaragawa Stadium	8,250
42	2017.11.19	Montedio Yamagata	4-1	FC Gifu	ND Soft Stadium Yamagata	5,748
