= Kotegawa =

Kotegawa (written: 小手川 or 古手川) is a Japanese surname. Notable people with the surname include:

- Koki Kotegawa (小手川 宏基, born 1989), Japanese footballer
- Yūko Kotegawa (古手川 祐子, born 1959), Japanese actress

== Fictional characters ==
- Yui Kotegawa (古手川 唯), a character in the manga series To Love-Ru
