= Masato Yamazaki =

Masato Yamazaki may refer to:

- Masato Yamazaki (footballer, born 1981) (山﨑 雅人), Japanese footballer
- Masato Yamazaki (footballer, born 1990) (山﨑 正登), Japanese footballer
