= Arata Sugiyama =

Japanese footballer

Arata Sugiyama 杉山 新
Personal information
- Full name: Arata Sugiyama
- Date of birth: July 25, 1980 (age 46)
- Place of birth: Kasukabe, Saitama, Japan
- Height: 1.67 m (5 ft 5 1/2 in)
- Position: Defender

Youth career
- 1996–1998: Kashiwa Reysol

Senior career*
Years	Team	Apps	(Gls)
1999–2002	Kashiwa Reysol	6	(0)
2003–2009	Ventforet Kofu	217	(4)
2010–2011	Omiya Ardija	42	(0)
2012	Yokohama FC	27	(0)
2013–2014	FC Gifu	41	(1)
Total		333	(5)
Medal record
Kashiwa Reysol
Winner	J.League Cup	1999
- * Club domestic league appearances and goals

Arata Sugiyama (杉山 新, Sugiyama Arata; born July 25, 1980) is a former Japanese football player.

== Playing career ==
Sugiyama was born in Kasukabe on July 25, 1980. He joined J1 League club Kashiwa Reysol from youth team in 1999. However he could hardly play in the match until 2002. In 2003, he moved to J2 League club Ventforet Kofu. He played many matches as right side back for a long time. From 2005, he completely became a regular player and the club was promoted to J1 from 2006. However the club was relegated to J2 from 2008. In 2010, he moved to J1 club Omiya Ardija based in his local Saitama Prefecture. He played many matches as right side back in 2 seasons. In 2012, he moved to J2 club Yokohama FC. In 2013, he moved to J2 club FC Gifu. Although he played many matches as regular player in 2013, he could hardly play in the match in 2014 and retired end of 2014 season.

== Career statistics ==
Appearances and goals by club, season and competition
Club	Season	League			Emperor's Cup		J.League Cup		Total	
Club	Season	Division	Apps	Goals	Apps	Goals	Apps	Goals	Apps	Goals
Kashiwa Reysol	1999	J1 League	0	0	0	0	1	0	1	0
Kashiwa Reysol	2000	J1 League	0	0	0	0	0	0	0	0
Kashiwa Reysol	2001	J1 League	4	0	0	0	0	0	4	0
Kashiwa Reysol	2002	J1 League	2	0	0	0	1	0	3	0
Ventforet Kofu	2003	J2 League	16	0	0	0	—		16	0
Ventforet Kofu	2004	J2 League	22	0	1	0	—		23	0
Ventforet Kofu	2005	J2 League	43	1	2	0	—		45	1
Ventforet Kofu	2006	J1 League	30	0	2	0	3	0	35	0
Ventforet Kofu	2007	J1 League	23	0	2	0	3	0	28	0
Ventforet Kofu	2008	J2 League	38	1	2	0	—		40	1
Ventforet Kofu	2009	J2 League	45	2	3	0	—		48	2
Omiya Ardija	2010	J1 League	23	0	1	1	2	0	26	1
Omiya Ardija	2011	J1 League	19	0	1	0	1	0	21	0
Yokohama FC	2012	J2 League	27	0	0	0	—		27	0
FC Gifu	2013	J2 League	33	1	1	0	—		34	1
FC Gifu	2014	J2 League	8	0	0	0	—		8	0
Career total			333	5	15	1	11	0	359	6
