= Toin University of Yokohama FC =

Japanese football club

Toin University of Yokohama FC 桐蔭横浜大学FC
- Full name: Toin University of Yokohama Football Club
- Founded: 2013; 13 years ago
- Ground: Toin Gakuen Multipurpose Ground
- Manager: (Japan) Hiroshi Sekita
- League: Kantō League D1
- 2020: 1st (Kantō League D2)
- Website: http://soccer.toin.ac.jp/

Toin University of Yokohama FC (桐蔭横浜大学FC) are a Japanese football (soccer) club based in Aoba-ku, Yokohama. They play in Division 1 of Kantō Soccer League.

== History ==
=== Kantō Soccer League team ===
Having been established in 2013, the Toin University Football Club rose quickly through the Kanagawa Prefecture leagues, gaining successive promotions from the Third, Second and then First Divisions in 2014, 2015 and 2016 respectfully.

They are currently managed by former player Hiroshi Sekita.

=== University team ===
Established in 1998, the representative team of the Toin University of Yokohama compete in the Kantō University Soccer League and the Emperor's Cup.

They are currently managed by former player Toru Yasutake.

== Structure ==
The club consists of 2 top teams. One play in the university competitions, and the other participate in the semi-professional Kantō Soccer League. All the players are students of the university.

The two teams played against each other in the 2020 Emperor's Cup.

== Semi-professional team ==
=== Current squad ===
As of 15 July 2020

Note: Flags indicate national team as defined under FIFA eligibility rules; some limited exceptions apply. Players may hold more than one non-FIFA nationality.

No.	Pos.	Nation	Player
1	GK	JPN	Kai Chide Kitamura
2	MF	JPN	Kazumu Takahashi
3	DF	JPN	Yudai Maruyama
4	DF	JPN	Kazuki Yoshida
6	MF	JPN	Kota Nakamura
7	FW	JPN	Koki Kanda
8	FW	JPN	Kaisei Tasaki
9	FW	JPN	Jukya Watanabe
10	FW	JPN	Yusei Otake
11	FW	JPN	Keita Shirawachi
12	DF	JPN	Hiroto Okoshi
13	MF	JPN	Chota Nakatani
14	DF	JPN	Hidetoshi Igarashi
15	FW	JPN	Kyoei Miyagwa
16	MF	JPN	Takumi Wajima

No.	Pos.	Nation	Player
17	DF	JPN	Shunsuke Nishimura
18	FW	JPN	Hayate Sato
19	DF	JPN	Kanta Omori
20	MF	JPN	Kai Ushirono
21	GK	JPN	Yuto Kido
22	DF	JPN	Riku Nakashima
23	GK	JPN	Aito Sato
24	MF	JPN	Shuto Okumura
25	DF	JPN	Naoto Matsui
26	FW	JPN	Manato Kawano
27	MF	JPN	Yuto Furuya
28	FW	JPN	Ryuto Suzuki
29	DF	JPN	Daiki Tanaka
30	FW	JPN	Kaito Oikawa

=== Season to season ===
Season	Tier	Division	Place
2014	9	Kanagawa Prefecture Third Division	1st
2015	8	Kanagawa Prefecture Second Division	2nd
2016	7	Kanagawa Prefecture First Division	1st
2017	6	Kantō League D2	3rd
2018	6	Kantō League D2	1st
2019	5	Kantō League D1	9th
2020	6	Kantō League D2	1st
2021	5	Kantō League D1	TBA

=== Honors ===
- Kanagawa Prefecture Third Division

Champions (1): 2014

- Kanagawa Prefecture Second Division

Runners up (1): 2015

- Kanagawa Prefecture First Division

Champions (1): 2016

- Kantō League D2

Champions (2): 2018, 2020

== University team ==
Toin University of Yokohama 桐蔭横浜大学
- Full name: Toin University of Yokohama
- Founded: 1998; 28 years ago
- Manager: (Japan) Toru Yasutake
- League: Kantō University Soccer League
- 2020: 5th
- Website: http://soccer.toin.ac.jp/

=== Current squad ===
Note: Flags indicate national team as defined under FIFA eligibility rules; some limited exceptions apply. Players may hold more than one non-FIFA nationality.

No.	Pos.	Nation	Player
—	GK	JPN	Keisuke Furuya
—	GK	JPN	Yuki Hayasaka
—	GK	JPN	Junya Nitta
—	GK	JPN	Shunya Nitta
—	GK	JPN	Yuto Tomiyoshi
—	DF	JPN	Itsubei Hada
—	DF	JPN	Takeshi Hasebe
—	DF	JPN	Shoma Kawachi
—	DF	JPN	Shunya Kutagi
—	DF	JPN	Jun Nabeta
—	DF	JPN	Rokuro Nakamura
—	DF	JPN	Shuto Nakano
—	DF	JPN	Tomoya Suzuki
—	DF	JPN	Keita Takahashi
—	DF	JPN	Shoma Takayoshi
—	MF	JPN	Shuto Asano
—	MF	JPN	Hiroto Chibato
—	MF	JPN	Masayoshi Endo
—	MF	JPN	Shintaro Ide
—	MF	JPN	Shun Ito
—	MF	JPN	Takayuki Kimura

No.	Pos.	Nation	Player
—	MF	JPN	Yuki Komori
—	MF	JPN	Seiya Kumagai
—	MF	JPN	Atsushi Kunitani
—	MF	JPN	Daiki Kusunoki
—	MF	JPN	Yuto Miyadera
—	MF	JPN	Keita Miyamoto
—	MF	JPN	Hayata Mizuno
—	MF	JPN	Sota Mizuno
—	MF	JPN	Shogo Muraoka
—	MF	JPN	Chofuto Nakatani
—	MF	JPN	Yosei Ozeki
—	MF	JPN	Daiju Sasaki
—	MF	JPN	Tomoya Shinohara
—	MF	JPN	Toshiki Takagi
—	MF	JPN	Takumi Tanaka
—	MF	JPN	Shimon Teranuma
—	MF	JPN	Naoya Yamaguchi
—	FW	JPN	Asato Nomura
—	FW	JPN	Shunsuke Suzuki
—	FW	JPN	Kaito Satori
—	FW	JPN	Shin Yamada

=== Season to season ===
Season	Tier	Division	Place
2011	2	Kantō University Soccer League Second Division	8th
2012	2	Kantō University Soccer League Second Division	2nd
2013	1	Kantō University Soccer League First Division	9th
2014	1	Kantō University Soccer League First Division	9th
2015	1	Kantō University Soccer League First Division	9th
2016	1	Kantō University Soccer League First Division	10th
2017	1	Kantō University Soccer League First Division	7th
2018	1	Kantō University Soccer League First Division	10th
2019	1	Kantō University Soccer League First Division	2nd
2020	1	Kantō University Soccer League First Division	5th
2021	1	Kantō University Soccer League First Division	TBA

=== Honors ===
- Kantō University Soccer League Second Division

Runners up (1): 2012

- Kantō University Soccer League First Division

Runners up (1): 2019

- Amino Cup

Champions (1): 2016

- Kanagawa Soccer Championship

Champions (4): 2013, 2015, 2019, 2020
Runners up (2): 2002, 2017
