= 2016 FC Gifu season =

FC Gifu
2016 season
- Manager: Ruy Ramos; Megumu Yoshida
- Stadium: Gifu Nagaragawa Stadium
- J2 League: 20th

2016 FC Gifu season.

== J2 League ==
=== League table ===
Pos	Team	Pld	W	D	L	GF	GA	GD	Pts	Promotion, qualification or relegation
19	Kamatamare Sanuki	42	10	13	19	43	62	−19	43	
20	FC Gifu	42	12	7	23	47	71	−24	43	
21	Zweigen Kanazawa (X)	42	8	15	19	36	60	−24	39	Qualification for relegation playoffs (Note: The playoffs and direct exchange between J2 and J3 are subject to eligibility of J2-licensed teams in top 2 of 2016 J3 League.)

Updated to match(es) played on 20 November 2016. Source: 2016 MEIJI YASUDA J2 LEAGUE League table
Rules for classification: 1) Points; 2) Goal difference; 3) Goals scored
(X) Relegation play-off winner

=== Match details ===
J2 League match details
Match	Date	Team	Score	Team	Venue	Attendance
1	2016.02.28	Thespakusatsu Gunma	4-0	FC Gifu	Shoda Shoyu Stadium Gunma	8,418
2	2016.03.06	FC Gifu	0-4	Hokkaido Consadole Sapporo	Gifu Nagaragawa Stadium	4,898
3	2016.03.13	FC Gifu	1-0	Giravanz Kitakyushu	Gifu Nagaragawa Stadium	3,215
4	2016.03.20	Ehime FC	0-3	FC Gifu	Ningineer Stadium	3,549
5	2016.03.26	FC Gifu	1-0	Mito HollyHock	Gifu Nagaragawa Stadium	4,484
6	2016.04.03	Tokushima Vortis	1-3	FC Gifu	Pocarisweat Stadium	3,508
7	2016.04.09	Kamatamare Sanuki	3-2	FC Gifu	Pikara Stadium	2,350
8	2016.04.17	FC Gifu	0-2	Matsumoto Yamaga FC	Gifu Nagaragawa Stadium	6,295
9	2016.04.23	Zweigen Kanazawa	1-2	FC Gifu	Ishikawa Athletics Stadium	3,008
10	2016.04.29	FC Gifu	1-2	Renofa Yamaguchi FC	Gifu Nagaragawa Stadium	6,058
11	2016.05.03	FC Machida Zelvia	1-1	FC Gifu	Machida Stadium	6,034
12	2016.05.08	FC Gifu	1-1	Shimizu S-Pulse	Gifu Nagaragawa Stadium	6,124
13	2016.05.15	Fagiano Okayama	0-1	FC Gifu	City Light Stadium	9,464
14	2016.05.22	JEF United Chiba	3-2	FC Gifu	Fukuda Denshi Arena	10,147
15	2016.05.28	FC Gifu	0-1	Montedio Yamagata	Gifu Nagaragawa Stadium	8,248
16	2016.06.04	FC Gifu	2-4	V-Varen Nagasaki	Gifu Nagaragawa Stadium	4,074
17	2016.06.08	Tokyo Verdy	1-1	FC Gifu	Ajinomoto Field Nishigaoka	3,120
18	2016.06.12	FC Gifu	0-1	Cerezo Osaka	Gifu Nagaragawa Stadium	8,087
19	2016.06.19	Yokohama FC	1-2	FC Gifu	NHK Spring Mitsuzawa Football Stadium	3,017
20	2016.06.26	FC Gifu	2-3	Roasso Kumamoto	Gifu Nagaragawa Stadium	4,507
21	2016.07.03	FC Gifu	0-1	Kyoto Sanga FC	Gifu Nagaragawa Stadium	4,126
22	2016.07.10	V-Varen Nagasaki	2-1	FC Gifu	Nagasaki Stadium	7,901
23	2016.07.16	Mito HollyHock	1-0	FC Gifu	K's denki Stadium Mito	4,318
24	2016.07.20	FC Gifu	0-1	Zweigen Kanazawa	Gifu Nagaragawa Stadium	4,081
25	2016.07.25	Hokkaido Consadole Sapporo	5-0	FC Gifu	Sapporo Dome	11,301
26	2016.07.31	Shimizu S-Pulse	2-0	FC Gifu	IAI Stadium Nihondaira	11,143
27	2016.08.07	FC Gifu	1-1	Kamatamare Sanuki	Gifu Nagaragawa Stadium	4,431
28	2016.08.11	Matsumoto Yamaga FC	1-1	FC Gifu	Matsumotodaira Park Stadium	15,602
29	2016.08.14	FC Gifu	1-1	Tokushima Vortis	Gifu Nagaragawa Stadium	4,109
30	2016.08.21	Montedio Yamagata	1-1	FC Gifu	ND Soft Stadium Yamagata	6,005
31	2016.09.11	FC Gifu	0-2	JEF United Chiba	Gifu Nagaragawa Stadium	7,562
32	2016.09.18	FC Gifu	2-1	Ehime FC	Gifu Nagaragawa Stadium	3,549
33	2016.09.25	Renofa Yamaguchi FC	2-3	FC Gifu	Ishin Memorial Park Stadium	5,026
34	2016.10.02	FC Gifu	0-5	Fagiano Okayama	Gifu Nagaragawa Stadium	5,250
35	2016.10.08	Cerezo Osaka	3-2	FC Gifu	Kincho Stadium	9,391
36	2016.10.16	Kyoto Sanga FC	1-0	FC Gifu	Kyoto Nishikyogoku Athletic Stadium	7,299
37	2016.10.22	FC Gifu	1-2	FC Machida Zelvia	Gifu Nagaragawa Stadium	4,674
38	2016.10.30	Giravanz Kitakyushu	2-1	FC Gifu	Honjo Stadium	3,700
39	2016.11.03	FC Gifu	2-1	Thespakusatsu Gunma	Gifu Nagaragawa Stadium	3,920
40	2016.11.06	FC Gifu	2-0	Yokohama FC	Gifu Nagaragawa Stadium	9,060
41	2016.11.12	Roasso Kumamoto	1-0	FC Gifu	Umakana-Yokana Stadium	6,306
42	2016.11.20	FC Gifu	4-2	Tokyo Verdy	Gifu Nagaragawa Stadium	12,158
