= Tatsuya Arai =

Japanese footballer

Personal information
- Full name: Tatsuya Arai
- Date of birth: 14 January 1988 (age 38)
- Place of birth: Tokyo, Japan
- Height: 1.88 m (6 ft 2 in)
- Position: Defender

Youth career
- Hachioji Chuo SC
- Tokyo West FC
- 2003–2005: Hinodai High School

College career
| Years | Team | Apps | (Gls) |
| 2006–2009 | Chuo University | | |

Senior career*
| Years | Team | Apps | (Gls) |
| 2010–2012 | Nagoya Grampus | 0 | (0) |
| 2012–2014 | FC Gifu | 32 | (3) |
| Total | | 32 | (3) |
- * Club domestic league appearances and goals

Tatsuya Arai (新井 辰也, Arai Tatsuya; born 14 January 1988) is a former Japanese football player.

== Career statistics ==
Appearances and goals by club, season and competition
| Club | Season | League | | | Emperor's Cup | | J.League Cup | | Total | |
| Club | Season | Division | Apps | Goals | Apps | Goals | Apps | Goals | Apps | Goals |
|---|---|---|---|---|---|---|---|---|---|---|
| Nagoya Grampus | 2010 | J1 League | 0 | 0 | 1 | 0 | 0 | 0 | 1 | 0 |
| Nagoya Grampus | 2011 | J1 League | 0 | 0 | 1 | 1 | 0 | 0 | 1 | 1 |
| Nagoya Grampus | 2012 | J1 League | 0 | 0 | — | | 0 | 0 | 0 | 0 |
| Nagoya Grampus | Total | | 0 | 0 | 2 | 1 | 0 | 0 | 2 | 1 |
| FC Gifu | 2012 | J2 League | 3 | 0 | 0 | 0 | — | | 3 | 0 |
| FC Gifu | 2013 | J2 League | 29 | 3 | 1 | 0 | — | | 30 | 3 |
| FC Gifu | 2014 | J2 League | 0 | 0 | 0 | 0 | — | | 0 | 0 |
| FC Gifu | Total | | 32 | 3 | 1 | 0 | 0 | 0 | 33 | 3 |
| Total | | | 32 | 3 | 3 | 1 | 0 | 0 | 35 | 4 |
