= Shuto Tanaka =

Japanese footballer

Personal information
- Full name: Shuto Tanaka
- Date of birth: November 8, 1985 (age 41)
- Place of birth: Tokyo, Japan
- Height: 1.78 m (5 ft 10 in)
- Position: Centre back

Youth career
- 2005–2008: University of Tsukuba

Senior career*
| Years | Team | Apps | (Gls) |
| 2009–2014 | FC Gifu | 197 | (7) |
| 2015–2019 | Kagoshima United | 90 | (7) |
- * Club domestic league appearances and goals

Shuto Tanaka (田中 秀人, Tanaka Shuto; born November 8, 1985) is a Japanese retired football player.

== Career statistics ==
Appearances and goals by club, season and competition
| Club | Season | League | | | Emperor's Cup | | J.League Cup | | Total | |
| Club | Season | Division | Apps | Goals | Apps | Goals | Apps | Goals | Apps | Goals |
|---|---|---|---|---|---|---|---|---|---|---|
| FC Gifu | 2009 | J2 League | 47 | 1 | 4 | 0 | — | | 51 | 1 |
| FC Gifu | 2010 | J2 League | 29 | 2 | 0 | 0 | — | | 29 | 2 |
| FC Gifu | 2011 | J2 League | 36 | 2 | 1 | 0 | — | | 37 | 2 |
| FC Gifu | 2012 | J2 League | 37 | 0 | 1 | 0 | — | | 38 | 0 |
| FC Gifu | 2013 | J2 League | 29 | 2 | 0 | 0 | — | | 29 | 2 |
| FC Gifu | 2014 | J2 League | 19 | 0 | 0 | 0 | — | | 19 | 0 |
| FC Gifu | Total | | 197 | 7 | 6 | 0 | 0 | 0 | 205 | 7 |
| Kagoshima United FC | 2015 | JFL | 16 | 2 | 1 | 0 | — | | 17 | 2 |
| Kagoshima United FC | 2016 | J3 League | 28 | 1 | 1 | 0 | — | | 29 | 1 |
| Kagoshima United FC | 2017 | J3 League | 31 | 1 | 2 | 0 | — | | 33 | 1 |
| Kagoshima United FC | 2018 | J3 League | 15 | 3 | 1 | 0 | — | | 16 | 3 |
| Kagoshima United FC | 2019 | J2 League | 0 | 0 | 0 | 0 | — | | 0 | 0 |
| Kagoshima United FC | Total | | 90 | 7 | 5 | 0 | 0 | 0 | 95 | 7 |
| Career total | | | 287 | 14 | 11 | 0 | — | | 294 | 14 |
