= Ogaki Asanaka Stadium =

Athletic stadium in Ōgaki, Gifu, Japan

- 大垣市浅中公園総合グラウンド陸上競技場
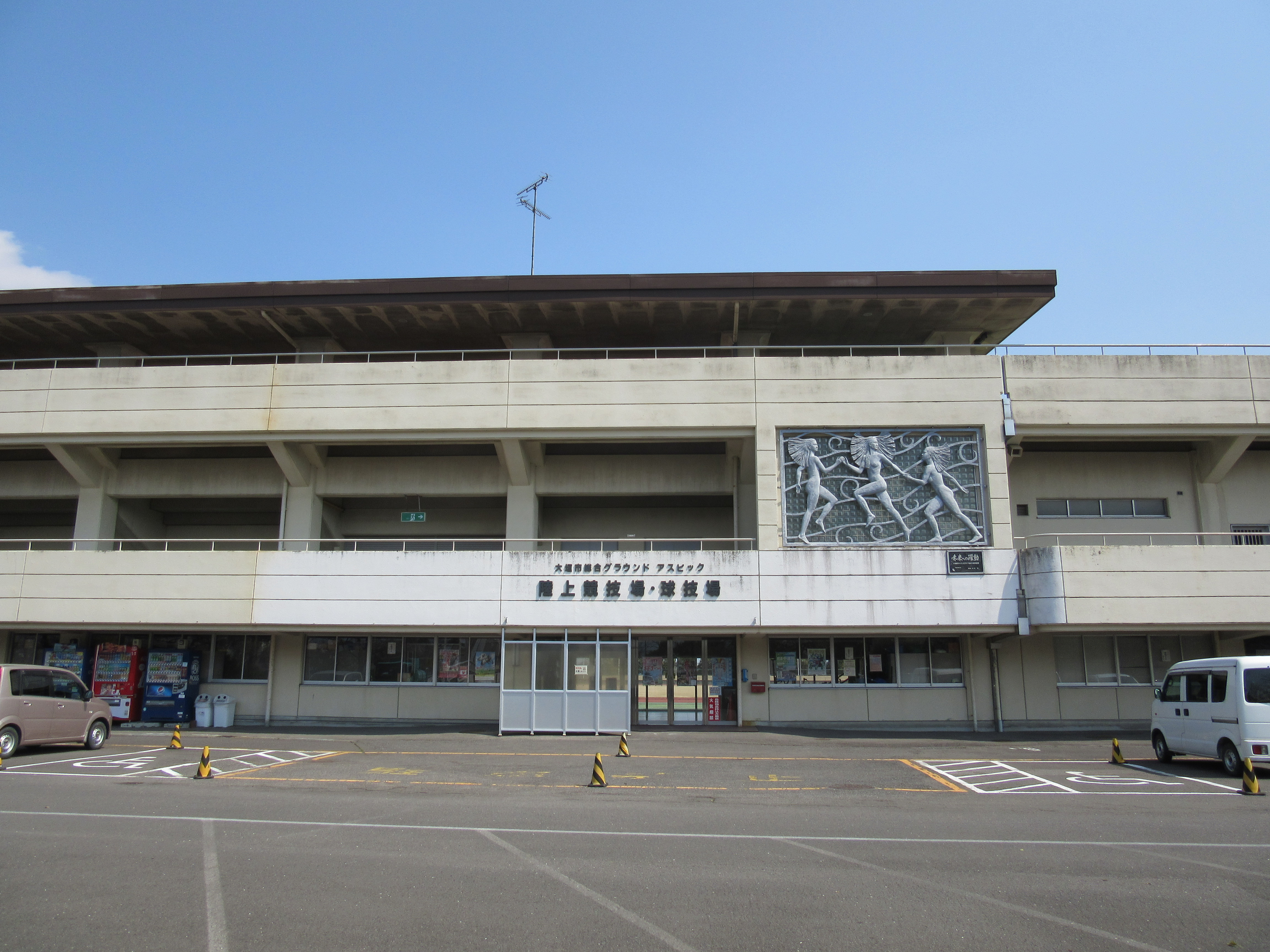
- Interactive map of Ogaki Asanaka Stadium
- Location: Ōgaki, Gifu, Japan
- Coordinates: 35.3153°N 136.6053°E
- Owner: Ōgaki City
- Capacity: 5,000

Construction
- Opened: 1987

Tenant
- Seino Transportation SC

Website
- Official site

Ogaki Asanaka Stadium (大垣市浅中公園総合グラウンド陸上競技場) is an athletic stadium in Ōgaki, Gifu, Japan.

It was used J2 League game between FC Gifu and Gainare Tottori on September 22, 2013.
