= Desmond N'Ze =

Footballer (born 1989)

Personal information
- Full name: Desmond N'Ze Kouassi
- Date of birth: 17 April 1989 (age 37)
- Place of birth: Sekondi, Ghana
- Height: 1.86 m (6 ft 1 in)
- Position: Centre-back

Youth career
- –2008: Verona

Senior career*
Years	Team	Apps	(Gls)
2006–2008	Verona	1	(0)
2008	Inter Milan	0	(0)
2008–2009	Avellino	10	(0)
2010	Valle del Giovenco	6	(0)
2011–2012	Milazzo	24	(0)
2012–2014	Fujieda MYFC	12	(1)
2013	→ FC Gifu (loan)	25	(2)
- * Club domestic league appearances and goals

Desmond N'Ze Kouassi (born 17 April 1989) known as Desmond N'Ze or just Desmond in Japan, is a former professional footballer who played as a centre-back. Born in Ghana, he is a naturalized Italian citizen.

== Career ==
=== Hellas Verona ===
N'Ze made his debut for Hellas Verona on 18 November 2006, coming on as a 27th-minute substitute in his side's 3–0 loss to Rimini. La Gazzetta dello Sport gave a 6 out of 10 score for his debut.

=== Inter Milan ===
After just one appearance for Hellas Verona first team, N'Ze signed for the reserve team of Inter Milan in January 2008 on an 18-month contract.

=== Avellino ===
After failing to make any appearances for the Inter Milan first team, Desmond signed for Serie B side Avellino in co-ownership deal. His debut was on 20 September 2008, coming on as an 85th-minute substitute is his side's 2–1 loss to AlbinoLeffe. N'Ze was an unused substitute in a 2008–09 Coppa Italia match on 20 August, where Avellino were eliminated by Reggiana. N'Ze made a total of ten appearances for the side in Serie B In June 2009 Inter gave up the remain 50% registration rights to Avellino. before they went bankrupt at the start of the following season and were reformed later in 2009.

=== Valle del Giovenco ===
In January 2010, Desmond joined Valle del Giovenco. He made his debut on 17 January 2010 in a 0–0 draw against Portosummaga, with La Gazzetta dello Sport rating his debut at 7 out of 10. However, he only played 5 more times for VdG before the team also went bankrupt at the start of the following season.

=== Milazzo ===
In March 2011 N'Ze joined Milazzo. He made his debut on 27 March 2011 against Vibonese. In the next season N'Ze played all 4 games in 2011–12 Coppa Italia Lega Pro and 19 games in 2011–12 Lega Pro Seconda Divisione. Much like N'Ze's previous teams, Milazzo folded in July 2012, before being reformed in 2014.

=== Fujieda MYCFC ===
In August 2012, N'Ze joined Japan Football League side Fujieda MYFC. He made his debut on 16 September 2012, playing the whole ninety minutes as Fujieda MYFC drew 0–0 with Zweigen Kanazawa. On 20 January 2014, he left the club.

=== FC Gifu ===
In January 2013, Desmond joined FC Gifu on loan to the end of 2013. He made his debut on 3 March 2013 against Yokohama FC, with Gifu losing the game 2–0. On 31 March 2013, he was sent off after receiving two yellow cards in Gifu's 3–0 loss to Tokyo Verdy. He scored his first goal for the club on 17 April 2013, in a 3–2 loss against Kataller Toyama.

=== Return to Fujieda MYFC ===
On 1 May 2014, Fujieda MYFC announced that they had re-signed N'Ze to play in their inaugural season in the J3 League, but on 4 August it was announced that he had left the club.

== Personal life ==
He also holds Italian nationality. His brother Marcus N'Ze is also a professional footballer.

In 2014, N'Ze began working for his friend Mario Balotelli as a personal assistant. He was notably his personal chauffeur at Liverpool, being frequently spotted sleeping in the passenger seat of Balotelli's Ferrari in Melwood's car park, waiting for his friend to finish training.

== Career statistics ==
As of 8 August 2014

Appearances and goals by club, season and competition
Club	Season	League		Cup		Other		Total	
Club	Season	Apps	Goals	Apps	Goals	Apps	Goals	Apps	Goals
Hellas Verona	2006–07	1	0	0	0	0	0	1	0
Hellas Verona	2007–08	0	0	0	0	0	0	0	0
Inter Milan	2007–08	0	0	0	0	0	0	0	0
Avellino	2008–09	10	0	0	0	0	0	0	0
Pescina	2009–10	6	0	0	0	0	0	6	0
Milazzo	2010–11	5	0	0	0	0	0	5	0
Milazzo	2011–12	19	0	4	0	0	0	23	0
Fujieda MYFC	2012	7	0	0	0	0	0	7	0
FC Gifu (loan)	2013	25	2	0	0	0	0	25	2
Fujieda MYFC	2014	5	1	0	0	0	0	5	1
Career total		73	3	4	0	0	0	77	3
