= Gakuji Ota =

Japanese footballer

Gakuji Ota 太田 岳志
Personal information
- Full name: Gakuji Ota
- Date of birth: 26 December 1990 (age 35)
- Place of birth: Kuwana, Mie, Japan
- Height: 1.90 m (6 ft 3 in)
- Position: Goalkeeper

Team information
- Current team: Kyoto Sanga FC
- Number: 1

Youth career
- Oyamada SS
- Ryosei Junior High School
- 2006–2008: Akatsuki High School

College career
Years	Team	Apps	(Gls)
2009–2012	Osaka Gakuin University		

Senior career*
Years	Team	Apps	(Gls)
2013–2015	FC Gifu	20	(0)
2016–2017	Tokyo Verdy	0	(0)
2018–2019	→ Kataller Toyama (loan)	7	(0)
2020-	Kyoto Sanga	74	(0)
- * Club domestic league appearances and goals as of 1 August 2026

Gakuji Ota (太田 岳志, Ota Gakuji; born 26 December 1990 in Kuwana, Mie) is a Japanese footballer. He currently plays for Kyoto Sanga FC.

== Club team career statistics ==
Updated to 12 November 2023.

Club	Season	League			Cup		League Cup		Total	
Club	Season	Division	Apps	Goals	Apps	Goals	Apps	Goals	Apps	Goals
Japan			League		Emperor's Cup		League Cup		Total	
FC Gifu	2013	J2 League	0	0	0	0	–		0	0
FC Gifu	2014	J2 League	2	0	1	0	–		3	0
FC Gifu	2015	J2 League	18	0	1	0	–		19	0
FC Gifu	Total		20	0	2	0	–		22	0
Tokyo Verdy	2016	J2 League	0	0	0	0	–		0	0
Tokyo Verdy	2017	J2 League	0	0	0	0	–		0	0
Tokyo Verdy	Total		0	0	0	0	–		0	0
Kataller Toyama (loan)	2018	J3 League	0	0	1	0	–		1	0
Kataller Toyama (loan)	2019	J3 League	7	0	3	0	–		10	0
Kataller Toyama (loan)	Total		7	0	4	0	–		11	0
Kyoto Sanga	2020	J2 League	0	0	–		–		0	0
Kyoto Sanga	2021	J2 League	0	0	0	0	–		0	0
Kyoto Sanga	2022	J1 League	0	0	0	0	1	0	1	0
Kyoto Sanga	2023	J1 League	12	0	1	0	3	0	16	0
Kyoto Sanga	Total		12	0	1	0	4	0	17	0
Career total			39	0	7	0	4	0	50	0
