= Lee Kwang-seon =

South Korean footballer

Lee Kwang-Seon
Personal information
- Full name: Lee Kwang-Seon
- Date of birth: September 6, 1989 (age 37)
- Place of birth: South Korea
- Height: 1.93 m (6 ft 4 in)
- Position: Defender

Team information
- Current team: Gyeongnam FC
- Number: 20

Senior career*
Years	Team	Apps	(Gls)
2012–2013	Vissel Kobe	37	(3)
2014–2015	Avispa Fukuoka	66	(2)
2016–2018	Jeju United	46	(7)
2017–2018	→ Sangju Sangmu (army)	29	(2)
2019–	Gyeongnam FC	87	(1)
- * Club domestic league appearances and goals as of 15 October 2022

- Lee Kwang-seon
- Hangul: 이광선
- Hanja: 李光善
- RR: I Gwangseon
- MR: I Kwangsŏn

Lee Kwang-Seon (Korean: 이광선; born September 6, 1989) is a South Korean football player who plays for Gyeongnam FC.

== Club statistics ==
As of match played 15 October 2022

Club performance			League		Cup		League Cup		Continental		Other		Total	
Season	Club	League	Apps	Goals	Apps	Goals	Apps	Goals	Apps	Goals	Apps	Goals	Apps	Goals
Japan			League		Emperor's Cup		J.League Cup		ACL		Other		Total	
2012	Vissel Kobe	J1 League	15	1	1	1	2	0	—		—		18	2
2013	Vissel Kobe	J2 League	22	2	0	0	—		—		—		22	2
2014	Avispa Fukuoka	J2 League	37	2	0	0	—		—		—		37	2
2015	Avispa Fukuoka	J2 League	29	0	2	1	—		—		0	0	31	1
South Korea			League		Korean FA Cup		Korean League Cup		ACL		Other		Total	
2016	Jeju United	K League 1	34	5	1	0	—		—		—		35	5
2017	Sangju Sangmu (Army)	K League 1	7	0	0	0	—		—		2	0	9	0
2018	Sangju Sangmu (Army)	K League 1	22	2	0	0	—		—		—		22	2
2018	Jeju United	K League 1	12	2	1	0	—		—		0	0	13	2
2019	Gyeongnam FC	K League 1	29	0	2	0	—		3	0	2	0	36	0
2020	Gyeongnam FC	K League 2	25	1	1	0	—		—		2	0	28	1
2021	Gyeongnam FC	K League 2	18	0	1	0	—		—		—		19	0
2022	Gyeongnam FC	K League 2	15	0	1	0	—		—		—		16	0
Country	Japan		103	5	5	2	0	0	0	0	0	0	108	7
Country	South Korea		162	10	7	0	0	0	3	0	6	0	178	10
Total			265	15	12	5	0	0	3	0	6	0	286	17
