= Daisuke Ishizu =

Japanese footballer (born 1990)

Daisuke Ishizu 石津 大介
Personal information
- Full name: Daisuke Ishizu
- Date of birth: January 15, 1990 (age 36)
- Place of birth: Fukuoka, Japan
- Height: 1.72 m (5 ft 7 1/2 in)
- Position: Forward

Team information
- Current team: FC Gifu
- Number: 51

Youth career
- 2008–2011: Fukuoka University

Senior career*
Years	Team	Apps	(Gls)
2010–2021	Avispa Fukuoka	299	(58)
2014–2016	→ Vissel Kobe (loan)	59	(6)
2022	FC Gifu	21	(2)
2023	Tegevajaro Miyazaki	33	(4)
Total		412	(70)
- * Club domestic league appearances and goals

Daisuke Ishizu (石津 大介, Ishizu Daisuke; born January 15, 1990) is a Japanese former football player.

== Career ==
=== Avispa Fukuoka ===
On 16 December 2016, it was announced that Ishizu would return from Vissel Kobe.

=== Loan to Vissel Kobe ===
On 9 August 2014, Ishizu was announced at Vissel Kobe. He made his league debut against Kashiwa Reysol on 16 August 2014. Ishizu scored his first league goal against Sagan Tosu on 2 November 2014, scoring in the 76th minute. His loan spell was extended on 12 January 2015. Ishizu's loan spell was further extended on 12 January 2016.

=== FC Gifu ===
After leaving Avispa Fukuoka, Ishizu joined FC Gifu's training camp. On 18 February 2022, he was announced at FC Gifu. On 17 November 2022, he left FC Gifu. After leaving, he took part in tryouts.

=== Tegevajaro Miyazaki ===
Ishizu made his league debut against FC Osaka on 12 March 2023. He scored his first league goal against Gifu on 30 April 2023, scoring in the 31st minute. On 12 December 2023, it was announced that Ishizu would be retiring at the end of the 2023 season.

== Career statistics ==
Updated to end of 2018 season.

Appearances and goals by club, season and competition
Club	Season	League			Emperor's Cup		J.League Cup		Total	
Club	Season	Division	Apps	Goals	Apps	Goals	Apps	Goals	Apps	Goals
Avispa Fukuoka	2012	J2 League	27	3	2	0	—		29	3
Avispa Fukuoka	2013	J2 League	39	11	0	0	—		39	11
Avispa Fukuoka	2014	J2 League	25	6	1	0	—		26	6
Vissel Kobe	2014	J1 League	13	1	—		2	0	15	1
Vissel Kobe	2015	J1 League	27	4	4	0	7	2	38	6
Vissel Kobe	2016	J1 League	19	1	3	1	6	1	28	3
Avispa Fukuoka	2017	J2 League	36	8	2	2	–		38	10
Avispa Fukuoka	2018	J2 League	39	8	2	0	–		41	8
Career total			225	42	14	3	15	3	254	48
