= Takumi Kiyomoto =

Japanese footballer

Takumi Kiyomoto 清本 拓己
Personal information
- Full name: Takumi Kiyomoto
- Date of birth: 7 June 1993 (age 33)
- Place of birth: Seki, Gifu, Japan
- Height: 1.68 m (5 ft 6 in)
- Position: Midfielder

Team information
- Current team: FC Osaka
- Number: 27

Youth career
- 2012–2013: Feyenoord

Senior career*
Years	Team	Apps	(Gls)
2013–2016	FC Gifu	47	(0)
2015	→ J. League U-22 (loan)	4	(0)
2016	→ Oita Trinita (loan)	29	(7)
2017–2018	Oita Trinita	29	(5)
2019	Gangwon FC	0	(0)
2019–2021	Fujieda MYFC	30	(6)
2022–	FC Osaka	11	(1)
- * Club domestic league appearances and goals as of 11 January 2023, 13:22 (UTC)

Takumi Kiyomoto (清本 拓己, Kiyomoto Takumi; born 7 June 1993) is a Japanese professional footballer who plays as a midfielder for J3 League newly promoted side, FC Osaka.

== Club career ==
On 1 January 2013, Kiyomoto joined FC Gifu from Feyenoord on a free transfer. He made his debut on 10 March 2013, coming on as a 46th-minute substitute in a 4–0 loss to Vissel Kobe.

On 13 July 2022, Kiyomoto announcement officially transfer to JFL club, FC Osaka for during mid 2022 season.

== Career statistics ==
=== Club ===
As of the start from 2023 season.

Appearances and goals by club, season and competition
Club	Season	League			Emperor's Cup		Total	
Club	Season	Division	Apps	Goals	Apps	Goals	Apps	Goals
FC Gifu	2013	J2 League	10	0	0	0	10	0
FC Gifu	2014	J2 League	22	0	1	0	23	0
FC Gifu	2015	J2 League	15	0	0	0	15	0
Oita Trinita	2016	J3 League	29	7	1	0	30	7
Oita Trinita	2017	J2 League	3	1	0	0	3	1
Oita Trinita	2018	J2 League	26	4	1	0	27	4
Gangwon FC	2019	K League 1	0	0	3	0	3	0
Fujieda MYFC	2019	J3 League	9	2	–		9	2
Fujieda MYFC	2020	J3 League	14	3	–		14	3
Fujieda MYFC	2021	J3 League	7	1	–		7	1
FC Osaka	2022	Japan Football League	11	1	–		11	1
FC Osaka	2023	J3 League	0	0	0	0	0	0
Career total			146	19	6	0	150	19
