= Fábio Martins (Brazilian footballer) =

Brazilian footballer (born 1989)

Personal information
- Full name: Fábio Freire Martins
- Date of birth: 27 March 1989 (age 37)
- Place of birth: Cornélio Procópio, Brazil
- Height: 1.86 m (6 ft 1 in)
- Position: Forward

Youth career
- 2005–2006: PSTC
- 2007–2008: Roma

Senior career*
Years	Team	Apps	(Gls)
2008	Roma		
2008–2009	Coritiba		
2009	Engenheiro Beltrão		
2009–2012	Roma	19	(6)
2012–2013	Arapongas		
2013	Gifu	5	(0)
2013	Fukushima United	5	(1)
2014	Maringá	3	(1)
2015–2016	Académico de Viseu	32	(2)
2016	Pedras Rubras	12	(1)
2016–2017	Farense	10	(2)
2017	Almancilense	19	(3)
2018	Castrense	12	(1)
2018–2019	Moncarapachense	14	(6)
2019	Almancilense	4	(1)
2020	Os 11 Esperanças	9	(4)
- * Club domestic league appearances and goals as of 1 August 2020

Fábio Freire Martins (born 27 March 1989), sometimes known as just Fábio, is a Brazilian professional footballer who played as a forward.

== Career ==
=== Roma ===
Fábio Martins joined Brazilian club Roma in July 2009. He went on to play 19 matches for the club in their state league, the Campeonato Paranaense.

=== FC Gifu ===
Fábio Martins signed for FC Gifu on 17 February 2013 from Arapongas on a free transfer. He made his debut 3 March 2013, coming on as 70th-minute substitute in FC Gifu's 2–0 loss to Yokohama FC. On 24 March 2013, on his first start for FC Gifu, Fábio was sent off for two bookable offences in his side's 2–1 loss to Tokushima Vortis. On 5 December 2013, he was released by FC Gifu.

=== Fukushima United ===
On 8 August 2013, it was announced that Fábio Martins had signed for Japan Football League club Fukushima United FC on loan. He made his debut on 15 September, coming on as a 67th-minute substitute in a 0–0 draw against Sony Sendai. In the next game on 22 September, Fábio scored his first goal for the club when he came on as an 89th-minute substitute in the 5–1 win over Tochigi Uva FC. On 5 December 2013, his loan with Fukushima expired.

== Career statistics ==
As of 21 February 2015

Appearances and goals by club, season and competition
Club	Season	League		Cup		Other		Total	
Club	Season	Apps	Goals	Apps	Goals	Apps	Goals	Apps	Goals
Roma	2011	0	0			2	0	2	0
Roma	2012	0	0			17	6	17	6
Roma	Total	0	0			19	6	19	6
Maringá	2014	3	1			14	2	17	3
FC Gifu	2013	5	0	0	0	0	0	5	0
Fukushima United FC	2013	6	1	2	0	0	0	8	1
Académico de Viseu	2014–15	15	1	0	0	0	0	15	1
Académico de Viseu	2015–16	17	1	1	0	0	0	18	1
Académico de Viseu	Total	32	2	1	0	0	0	33	2
Pedras Rubras	2015–16	12	1	0	0	0	0	12	1
Career total		58	5	36	8	0	0	94	13
