= Kohei Nakashima =

Japanese footballer

Personal information
- Date of birth: December 7, 1989 (age 36)
- Place of birth: Shimane, Japan
- Height: 1.75 m (5 ft 9 in)
- Position: Forward

Team information
- Current team: Verspah Oita
- Number: 11

Youth career
- 2008–2011: Fukuyama University

Senior career*
| Years | Team | Apps | (Gls) |
| 2012–2013 | FC Gifu | 26 | (1) |
| 2014 | FC Machida Zelvia | 5 | (0) |
| 2015 | Vonds Ichihara | 9 | (3) |
| 2016– | Verspah Oita | | |
| Total | | 40 | (4) |
- * Club domestic league appearances and goals as of December 31, 2015

Kohei Nakashima (中島 康平, Nakashima Kohei; born December 7, 1989) is a Japanese football player. He plays for Verspah Oita.

== Career statistics ==
Appearances and goals by club, season and competition
| Club | Season | League | | | Emperor's Cup | | Total | |
| Club | Season | Division | Apps | Goals | Apps | Goals | Apps | Goals |
|---|---|---|---|---|---|---|---|---|
| FC Gifu | 2012 | J2 League | 16 | 0 | 0 | 0 | 16 | 0 |
| FC Gifu | 2013 | J2 League | 10 | 1 | 0 | 0 | 10 | 1 |
| FC Machida Zelvia | 2014 | J3 League | | | | | | |
| Career total | | | 26 | 1 | 0 | 0 | 26 | 1 |
