= Park Kun =

South Korean footballer

Personal information
- Full name: Park Kun
- Date of birth: July 11, 1990 (age 36)
- Place of birth: Gunsan, South Korea
- Height: 1.85 m (6 ft 1 in)
- Position: Defender

Team information
- Current team: Pohang Steelers

Youth career
- 2009–2012: University of Suwon

Senior career*
Years	Team	Apps	(Gls)
2013–2015	Avispa Fukuoka	69	(1)
2015–2016	Nagano Parceiro	21	(1)
2016	→ Thespakusatsu Gunma (loan)	21	(1)
2017–	Thespakusatsu Gunma	36	(0)
2018–19	Bucheon FC 1995	51	(1)
2022 -	Pohang Steelers FC	1	(0)
- * Club domestic league appearances and goals as of 26 September 2021

Park Kun (パク・ゴン) is a South Korean football player. He currently plays for Pohang Steelers.

== Club statistics ==
Updated to 23 February 2017.

Club performance			League		Cup		Total	
Season	Club	League	Apps	Goals	Apps	Goals	Apps	Goals
Japan			League		Emperor's Cup		Total	
2013	Avispa Fukuoka	J2 League	31	0	0	0	31	0
2014	Avispa Fukuoka	J2 League	35	1	0	0	35	1
2015	Avispa Fukuoka	J2 League	3	0	–		3	0
2015	Nagano Parceiro	J3 League	19	1	2	0	21	1
2016	Nagano Parceiro	J3 League	2	0	–		2	0
2016	Thespakusatsu Gunma	J2 League	21	1	1	0	22	1
Total			111	3	3	0	114	3
