= Hiroyuki Sugimoto =

Japanese footballer

Personal information
- Date of birth: October 6, 1986 (age 40)
- Place of birth: Saitama, Japan
- Height: 1.80 m (5 ft 11 in)
- Position: Forward

Youth career
- 2005–2008: Meiji University

Senior career*
Years	Team	Apps	(Gls)
2009–2012	Thespa Kusatsu	46	(2)
2013	FC Gifu	5	(1)
2014–2015	TTM Customs		
2016–2018	Chamchuri United	71	(26)
- * Club domestic league appearances and goals

Hiroyuki Sugimoto (杉本 裕之, Sugimoto Hiroyuki; born October 6, 1986) is a Japanese football player.

== Career ==
Hiroyuki Sugimoto or "Sugi" started football career in Japan. He played for FC Gifu. He then continued his career in Thailand after departing FC Gifu. His first Thai club was TTM Customs, a Yamaha League 1 football club (second-tier league). In early 2016, He joined Chamchuri United, a team in AIS League Division 2 club (third-tier league). In the name of Pink Power, he played his first game against Army United. His debut was tremendous with a winning goal to the team.

At the end of 2017, he has played 45 games and scored 20 goals with 13 assists for the team, crowned with one of leading goal scorers for Chamchuri United. In season 2017, he was a club top goal scorer by 13 goals. In season 2018, he was used as a wide targetman or inside forward which he contributed both supporting and defensive roles to the team. He scored 6 goals and provided 1 assist in 2018. During his career with Chamchuri United, he has shown his skill as a shadow striker and deep-lying forward who helps linking between midfield and forward.

From season 2015 to 2018, Sugi has played 71 games, scored 26 goals and provided 14 assists for Chamchuri United.

== Club statistics ==
Club performance			League		Cup		Total	
Season	Club	League	Apps	Goals	Apps	Goals	Apps	Goals
Japan			League		Emperor's Cup		Total	
2009	Thespa Kusatsu	J2 League	0	0	0	0	0	0
2010	Thespa Kusatsu	J2 League	17	0	1	0	18	0
2011	Thespa Kusatsu	J2 League						
Country	Japan		17	0	1	0	18	0
2016	Chamchuri United	AIS League Division 2 (3rd-tier League)	21	7	0	0	0	0
2017	Chamchuri United	T3 League (3rd-tier League)	24	13				
2018	Chamchuri United	T3 League (3rd-tier League)	26	6				
Country	Thailand		71	26	0	0	0	0
Total			88	26	1	0	106	26

== Honours ==
=== Clubs ===
Chamchuri United

- Regional League Bangkok Area Division (1): 2016
