= Shota Inoue =

Japanese footballer

Shota Inoue 井上 翔太
Personal information
- Full name: Shota Inoue
- Date of birth: 24 April 1989 (age 37)
- Place of birth: Ehime, Japan
- Height: 1.70 m (5 ft 7 in)
- Position: Midfielder

Team information
- Current team: TIAMO Hirakata
- Number: 28

Youth career
- 2005–2007: Higashi Fukuoka High School
- 2008–2011: Hannan University

Senior career*
Years	Team	Apps	(Gls)
2012–2013	Cerezo Osaka	0	(0)
2013	→ Giravanz Kitakyushu (loan)	16	(3)
2014–2019	Giravanz Kitakyushu	144	(11)
2020–	TIAMO Hirakata	4	(1)
- * Club domestic league appearances and goals as of 16:30, 18 September 2020 (UTC)

Shota Inoue (井上 翔太, Inoue Shōta; born 24 April 1989 in Ehime) is a Japanese football player currently playing for FC TIAMO Hirakata.

== Club team career statistics ==
Updated to 23 February 2020.

Club performance			League		Cup		League Cup		Total	
Season	Club	League	Apps	Goals	Apps	Goals	Apps	Goals	Apps	Goals
Japan			League		Emperor's Cup		League Cup		Total	
2012	Cerezo Osaka	J1 League	0	0	0	0	0	0	0	0
2013	Cerezo Osaka	J1 League	0	0	–		0	0	0	0
2013	Giravanz Kitakyushu	J2 League	16	3	1	0	–		17	3
2014	Giravanz Kitakyushu	J2 League	27	2	3	0	–		30	2
2015	Giravanz Kitakyushu	J2 League	37	6	0	0	–		37	6
2016	Giravanz Kitakyushu	J2 League	34	1	2	1	–		36	2
2017	Giravanz Kitakyushu	J3 League	19	0	2	0	–		21	0
2018	Giravanz Kitakyushu	J3 League	23	2	0	0	–		23	2
2019	Giravanz Kitakyushu	J3 League	4	0	2	0	–		6	0
Career total			170	14	10	1	0	0	170	15
