= Tetsuya Funatsu =

Japanese footballer (born 1987)

Tetsuya Funatsu 舩津 徹也
Personal information
- Full name: Tetsuya Funatsu
- Date of birth: February 9, 1987 (age 39)
- Place of birth: Osaka, Japan
- Height: 1.78 m (5 ft 10 in)
- Positions: Defender; defensive midfielder

Team information
- Current team: Thespakusatsu Gunma
- Number: 2

Youth career
- 2005–2008: Biwako Seikei Sport College

Senior career*
Years	Team	Apps	(Gls)
2009–2013	Kataller Toyama	99	(6)
2012	→ Cerezo Osaka (loan)	5	(0)
2014–2015	Montedio Yamagata	59	(6)
2016–	Thespakusatsu Gunma	125	(4)
Medal record
Montedio Yamagata
Runner-up	Emperor's Cup	2014
- * Club domestic league appearances and goals as of 23 February 2020

Tetsuya Funatsu (舩津 徹也, Funatsu Tetsuya; born February 9, 1987, in Osaka) is a Japanese football player who plays for Thespakusatsu Gunma.

== Career statistics ==
Updated to 23 February 2020.

Appearances and goals by club, season and competition
Club	Season	League			Emperor's Cup		J.League Cup		Total	
Club	Season	Division	Apps	Goals	Apps	Goals	Apps	Goals	Apps	Goals
Kataller Toyama	2009	J2 League	37	2	1	0	—		38	2
Kataller Toyama	2010	J2 League	31	1	1	0	—		32	1
Kataller Toyama	2011	J2 League	31	3	2	1	—		33	4
Cerezo Osaka	2012	J1 League	5	0	0	0	3	0	8	0
Montedio Yamagata	2013	J2 League	37	6	0	0	—		37	6
Montedio Yamagata	2014	J2 League	15	0	5	0	—		20	0
Montedio Yamagata	2015	J1 League	7	0	1	0	5	0	13	0
Thespakusatsu Gunma	2016	J2 League	40	2	1	0	—		41	2
Thespakusatsu Gunma	2017	J2 League	27	1	2	0	—		29	1
Thespakusatsu Gunma	2018	J3 League	26	0	1	0	—		27	0
Thespakusatsu Gunma	2019	J3 League	32	1	0	0	—		32	1
Career total			288	16	14	1	8	0	310	17
