= Kazuki Someya =

Japanese footballer

Kazuki Someya 染矢 一樹
Personal information
- Full name: Kazuki Someya
- Date of birth: October 13, 1986 (age 40)
- Place of birth: Osaka, Japan
- Height: 1.65 m (5 ft 5 in)
- Position: Midfielder

Team information
- Current team: Azul Claro Numazu
- Number: 50

Youth career
- –2001: Higashiyodo Junior High School
- 2002–2004: Gonokawa High School

College career
Years	Team	Apps	(Gls)
2005–2008	Nara Shogyo University		

Senior career*
Years	Team	Apps	(Gls)
2009–2013	FC Gifu	165	(18)
2014–2015	Fagiano Okayama	27	(1)
2016	Oita Trinita	0	(0)
2016–	Azul Claro Numazu	26	(2)
- * Club domestic league appearances and goals as of 23 February 2018

Kazuki Someya (染矢 一樹, Someya Kazuki; born October 13, 1986) is a Japanese football player who plays as a midfielder for Azul Claro Numazu.

== Career statistics ==
Updated to 23 February 2018.

Appearances and goals by club, season and competition
Club	Season	League			Emperor's Cup		Total	
Club	Season	Division	Apps	Goals	Apps	Goals	Apps	Goals
FC Gifu	2009	J2 League	41	4	3	0	44	4
FC Gifu	2010	J2 League	21	1	1	0	22	1
FC Gifu	2011	J2 League	29	2	1	0	29	2
FC Gifu	2012	J2 League	36	1	1	0	36	1
FC Gifu	2013	J2 League	38	10	1	1	39	11
Fagiano Okayama	2014	J2 League	10	0	1	0	11	0
Fagiano Okayama	2015	J2 League	17	1	1	0	18	1
Oita Trinita	2016	J3 League	0	0	0	0	0	0
Azul Claro Numazu	2016	JFL	6	0	–		6	0
Azul Claro Numazu	2017	J3 League	20	2	1	0	21	2
Total			218	21	10	0	228	21
