= Yuki Nakamura =

Japanese footballer

Personal information
- Full name: Yuki Nakamura
- Date of birth: 4 June 1987 (age 39)
- Place of birth: Shizuoka, Japan
- Height: 1.83 m (6 ft 0 in)
- Position: Forward

Youth career
- ?–2006: Shimizu S-Pulse

Senior career*
Years	Team	Apps	(Gls)
2010–2011	Gaz Metan CFR Craiova	23	(2)
2011	→ Viktoria Žižkov (loan)	4	(0)
2012	Bodva Moldava nad Bodvou	4	(0)
2012	→ Rimavská Sobota (loan)	6	(0)
2013–2014	FC Gifu	10	(1)
2015–2016	Júbilo Iwata	15	(1)
Total		62	(4)
- * Club domestic league appearances and goals as of 21 February 2020

Yuki Nakamura (中村 祐輝, Nakamura Yūki; born 4 June 1987) is a former Japanese football forward.

== Career ==
In 2010 he started his professional career playing in the Romanian Second Division for Gaz Metan CFR Craiova. In August 2011, he joined Slovak club Bodva Moldava nad Bodvou.

In July 2013, Nakamura joined J. League Division 2 team FC Gifu on a free transfer.

On February 4, 2017, he announced the end of his professional career.

== Career statistics ==
As of 21 February 2020

Club performance			League		Cup		League Cup		Total	
Season	Club	League	Apps	Goals	Apps	Goals	Apps	Goals	Apps	Goals
Romania			League		Cupa României		Cupa Ligii		Total	
2009–10	Gaz Metan CFR Craiova	Liga II - Serie B	10	1	0	0	-		10	1
2010–11	Gaz Metan CFR Craiova	Liga II - Serie B	13	1	1	0	-		14	1
Czech Republic			League		Czech Cup		League CUp		Total	
2010–11	FK Viktoria Žižkov	2.Liga	4	0			-		4	0
Slovakia			League		Slovak Cup		League Cup		Total	
2011–12	Moldava	2.Liga	4	0			-		4	0
2011–12	Rimavská Sobota	2.Liga	6	0			-		6	0
Japan			League		Emperor's Cup		League Cup		Total	
2013	FC Gifu	J.League 2	9	1	0	0	-		9	1
2014	FC Gifu	J.League 2	1	0	1	0	-		2	0
2015	Júbilo Iwata	J.League 2	15	1	0	0	-		15	1
2016	Júbilo Iwata	J.League	0	0	2	0	-		2	0
Total	Romania		23	2	1	0			24	2
Total	Czech Republic		4	0					4	0
Total	Slovakia		10	0					10	0
Total	Japan		25	2	3	0	0	0	28	2
Career total			62	4	4	0	0	0	66	4
