= Hiroshi Sekita =

Japanese footballer

Personal information
- Date of birth: October 2, 1989 (age 37)
- Place of birth: Sagamihara, Japan
- Height: 1.85 m (6 ft 1 in)
- Positions: Centre back; left back

Senior career*
Years	Team	Apps	(Gls)
2012–2015	FC Gifu	60	(2)
2016–2017	AC Nagano Parceiro		

Managerial career
- 2019–: Toin University of Yokohama FC
- * Club domestic league appearances and goals as of 13 March 2021

Hiroshi Sekita (関田 寛士, born October 2, 1989) is a Japanese football former player.

== Club statistics ==
Updated to 23 February 2017.

Club performance			League		Cup		League Cup		Total	
Season	Club	League	Apps	Goals	Apps	Goals	Apps	Goals	Apps	Goals
Japan			League		Emperor's Cup		League Cup		Total	
2012	FC Gifu	J2 League	35	1	1	0	-		36	1
2013	FC Gifu	J2 League	10	0	1	0	-		11	0
2014	FC Gifu	J2 League	13	1	1	1	-		14	2
2015	FC Gifu	J2 League	2	0	0	0	-		2	0
2016	Nagano Parceiro	J3 League	0	0	0	0	-		2	0
Total			60	2	3	1	-		63	3
