= Yuki Horigome =

Japanese footballer (born 1992)

Personal information
- Full name: Yuki Horigome
- Date of birth: 13 December 1992 (age 33)
- Place of birth: Kōfu, Yamanashi, Japan
- Height: 1.68 m (5 ft 6 in)
- Positions: Attacking midfielder; winger

Team information
- Current team: Hokkaido Consadole Sapporo
- Number: 13

Youth career
- 1999–2004: Osato SSS
- 2005–2010: Ventforet Kofu

Senior career*
Years	Team	Apps	(Gls)
2010–2015	Ventforet Kofu	36	(1)
2013	→ Roasso Kumamoto (loan)	25	(4)
2014	→ Ehime FC (loan)	42	(8)
2016	Kyoto Sanga FC	37	(7)
2017–2018	Ventforet Kofu	48	(7)
2019–2022	JEF United Chiba	50	(3)
2021	→ Montedio Yamagata (loan)	8	(0)
2022–2026	Sagan Tosu	95	(6)
2025	→ Ehime FC (loan)	11	(0)
2026–	Hokkaido Consadole Sapporo	6	(0)

International career
2009	Japan U-17	3	(0)
- * Club domestic league appearances and goals as of 13 August 2026

Yuki Horigome (堀米 勇輝, Horigome Yūki; born 13 December 1992) is a Japanese football player for Hokkaido Consadole Sapporo.

== Club career ==
Horigome was born in Kofu on 13 December 1992. In August 2010, he joined his local club Ventforet Kofu from the youth team. He made his league debut for Ventforet against Júbilo Iwata on 5 March 2011. He scored his first goal for the club against Mito HollyHock on 12 August 2012, scoring in the 8th minute.

From 2013, he played for Roasso Kumamoto. He scored on his league debut for the club against Mito Hollyhock on 3 May 2013, scoring a penalty in the 43rd minute.

Yuki made his league debut for Ehime against Yokohama FC on 2 March 2014. He scored his first goal for the club against Matsumoto Yamaga on 3 May 2014, scoring in the 28th minute.

He returned to Ventforet in 2015.

In 2016, he moved to Kyoto Sanga FC. He made his league debut for the club against Hokkaido Consadole Sapporo on 26 March 2013. He scored his first goal for the club against Montedio Yamagata on 3 April 2016, scoring in the 48th minute.

In 2017, he returned to Ventforet. During his second spell with the club, he made his league debut for Ventforet against Kashima Antlers on 4 March 2017. He scored his first goal for the club against Vissel Kobe on 30 April 2017, scoring in the 38th minute.

Yuki made his league debut for JEF United against Ehime on 24 February 2019. He scored his first goal for the club against V-Varen Nagasaki on 12 October 2019, scoring in the 69th minute.

Yuki made his league debut for Montedio against Matsumoto Yamaga on 14 March 2021.

Yuki made his league debut for Sagan against Sanfrecce Hiroshima on 19 February 2022. He scored his first league goal for the club against FC Tokyo on 8 May 2022, scoring in the 81st minute.

== National team career ==
In October 2009, Horigome was elected for the Japan U-17 national team to play in the 2009 U-17 World Cup. He played all 3 matches.

== Club statistics ==
Updated to 19 July 2022.

Club	Season	League		Emperor's Cup		J. League Cup		Total	
Club	Season	Apps	Goals	Apps	Goals	Apps	Goals	Apps	Goals
Ventforet Kofu	2010	0	0	0	0	–		0	0
Ventforet Kofu	2011	3	0	2	0	0	0	5	0
Ventforet Kofu	2012	21	1	1	0	–		22	1
Ventforet Kofu	2013	0	0	–		3	0	3	0
Roasso Kumamoto	2013	25	4	1	0	–		26	4
Ehime FC	2014	42	8	3	0	–		45	8
Ventforet Kofu	2015	12	0	3	0	6	1	21	1
Kyoto Sanga	2016	37	7	2	0	–		39	7
Ventforet Kofu	2017	21	2	1	0	5	0	27	2
Ventforet Kofu	2018	27	5	0	0	4	0	31	5
JEF United Chiba	2019	27	1	1	0	–		28	1
JEF United Chiba	2020	23	2	–		–		23	2
Montedio Yamagata	2021	8	0	0	0	–		8	0
Sagan Tosu	2022	18	2	2	0	2	0	22	2
Total		264	32	16	0	20	1	300	33

== Awards and honours ==
=== Club ===
Ventforet Kofu

- J. League Division 2 (1) : 2012
