= Makoto Shibahara =

Japanese footballer

Personal information
- Date of birth: April 23, 1992 (age 34)
- Place of birth: Shizuoka, Japan
- Height: 1.66 m (5 ft 5 1/2 in)
- Position: Midfielder

Youth career
- 2008–2010: Shimizu S-Pulse

Senior career*
| Years | Team | Apps | (Gls) |
| 2011–2013 | Shimizu S-Pulse | 0 | (0) |
| 2013 | FC Gifu | 16 | (0) |
| 2014 | Fukushima United FC | 12 | (1) |
| Total | | 28 | (1) |
Medal record
Shimizu S-Pulse
| Runner-up | J.League Cup | 2012 |
- * Club domestic league appearances and goals

Makoto Shibahara (柴原 誠, Shibahara Makoto; born April 23, 1992) is a former Japanese football player.
