= 2014 FC Gifu season =

FC Gifu
2014 season
- Manager: Ruy Ramos
- Stadium: Gifu Nagaragawa Stadium
- J2 League: 17th

2014 FC Gifu season.

== J2 League ==
Match	Date	Team	Score	Team	Venue	Attendance
1	2014.03.02	FC Gifu	3-1	Kamatamare Sanuki	Gifu Nagaragawa Stadium	11,069
2	2014.03.09	FC Gifu	3-0	Kataller Toyama	Gifu Nagaragawa Stadium	7,879
3	2014.03.16	Montedio Yamagata	3-1	FC Gifu	ND Soft Stadium Yamagata	7,038
4	2014.03.22	FC Gifu	2-3	Shonan Bellmare	Gifu Nagaragawa Stadium	7,222
5	2014.03.30	Ehime FC	0-0	FC Gifu	Ningineer Stadium	3,532
6	2014.04.05	FC Gifu	1-2	Avispa Fukuoka	Gifu Nagaragawa Stadium	5,022
7	2014.04.13	Yokohama FC	0-1	FC Gifu	NHK Spring Mitsuzawa Football Stadium	5,658
8	2014.04.20	FC Gifu	1-3	Tochigi SC	Gifu Nagaragawa Stadium	5,460
9	2014.04.26	Matsumoto Yamaga FC	1-0	FC Gifu	Matsumotodaira Park Stadium	13,657
10	2014.04.29	FC Gifu	1-0	Thespakusatsu Gunma	Gifu Nagaragawa Stadium	3,870
11	2014.05.03	Tokyo Verdy	0-1	FC Gifu	Tokyo National Stadium	12,115
12	2014.05.06	FC Gifu	2-2	JEF United Chiba	Gifu Nagaragawa Stadium	6,524
13	2014.05.11	Mito HollyHock	3-2	FC Gifu	K's denki Stadium Mito	5,053
14	2014.05.18	Fagiano Okayama	2-1	FC Gifu	Kanko Stadium	10,756
15	2014.05.25	FC Gifu	1-1	Giravanz Kitakyushu	Gifu Nagaragawa Stadium	4,330
16	2014.06.01	FC Gifu	2-1	Kyoto Sanga FC	Gifu Nagaragawa Stadium	6,060
17	2014.06.07	Oita Trinita	1-0	FC Gifu	Oita Bank Dome	9,267
18	2014.06.14	FC Gifu	0-4	Júbilo Iwata	Gifu Nagaragawa Stadium	15,138
19	2014.06.21	FC Gifu	1-1	V-Varen Nagasaki	Gifu Nagaragawa Stadium	13,016
20	2014.06.28	Consadole Sapporo	3-2	FC Gifu	Sapporo Atsubetsu Stadium	7,293
21	2014.07.05	Roasso Kumamoto	0-3	FC Gifu	Umakana-Yokana Stadium	5,550
22	2014.07.20	FC Gifu	1-2	Yokohama FC	Gifu Nagaragawa Stadium	12,465
23	2014.07.26	Kamatamare Sanuki	1-2	FC Gifu	Kagawa Marugame Stadium	3,337
24	2014.07.30	FC Gifu	2-2	Fagiano Okayama	Gifu Nagaragawa Stadium	5,212
25	2014.08.03	V-Varen Nagasaki	0-2	FC Gifu	Nagasaki Stadium	5,880
26	2014.08.10	FC Gifu	4-3	Ehime FC	Gifu Nagaragawa Stadium	3,162
27	2014.08.17	Thespakusatsu Gunma	2-2	FC Gifu	Shoda Shoyu Stadium Gunma	4,309
28	2014.08.24	Avispa Fukuoka	1-0	FC Gifu	Level5 Stadium	4,095
29	2014.08.31	FC Gifu	3-0	Tokyo Verdy	Gifu Nagaragawa Stadium	7,178
30	2014.09.06	Kataller Toyama	0-0	FC Gifu	Toyama Stadium	4,571
31	2014.09.14	FC Gifu	1-1	Consadole Sapporo	Gifu Nagaragawa Stadium	10,580
32	2014.09.20	JEF United Chiba	1-0	FC Gifu	Fukuda Denshi Arena	7,276
33	2014.09.23	FC Gifu	2-3	Roasso Kumamoto	Gifu Nagaragawa Stadium	7,328
34	2014.09.28	Shonan Bellmare	0-0	FC Gifu	Shonan BMW Stadium Hiratsuka	8,047
35	2014.10.04	FC Gifu	1-0	Montedio Yamagata	Gifu Nagaragawa Stadium	5,512
36	2014.10.11	Júbilo Iwata	3-1	FC Gifu	Yamaha Stadium	8,630
37	2014.10.19	FC Gifu	0-2	Mito HollyHock	Gifu Nagaragawa Stadium	5,524
38	2014.10.26	Giravanz Kitakyushu	2-0	FC Gifu	Honjo Stadium	4,469
39	2014.11.01	FC Gifu	2-3	Oita Trinita	Gifu Nagaragawa Stadium	4,190
40	2014.11.09	Tochigi SC	3-0	FC Gifu	Tochigi Green Stadium	4,085
41	2014.11.15	FC Gifu	3-1	Matsumoto Yamaga FC	Gifu Nagaragawa Stadium	12,518
42	2014.11.23	Kyoto Sanga FC	0-0	FC Gifu	Kyoto Nishikyogoku Athletic Stadium	10,717
