= Shogo Tokihisa =

Japanese footballer

Personal information
- Date of birth: April 15, 1984 (age 42)
- Place of birth: Fukuoka, Japan
- Height: 1.87 m (6 ft 1 1/2 in)
- Position: Goalkeeper

Youth career
- 2003–2006: Waseda University

Senior career*
Years	Team	Apps	(Gls)
2007–2009	Ventforet Kofu	0	(0)
2010–2011	Giravanz Kitakyushu	3	(0)
2012–2014	FC Gifu	56	(0)
Total		59	(0)
- * Club domestic league appearances and goals

Shogo Tokihisa (時久 省吾, Tokihisa Shogo; born April 15, 1984) is a former Japanese football player.

== Career statistics ==
Appearances and goals by club, season and competition
Club	Season	League			Emperor's Cup		J.League Cup		Total	
Club	Season	Division	Apps	Goals	Apps	Goals	Apps	Goals	Apps	Goals
Ventforet Kofu	2007	J1 League	0	0	0	0	0	0	0	0
Ventforet Kofu	2008	J2 League	0	0	0	0	—		0	0
Ventforet Kofu	2009	J2 League	0	0	0	0	—		0	0
Giravanz Kitakyushu	2010	J2 League	2	0	0	0	—		2	0
Giravanz Kitakyushu	2011	J2 League	1	0	0	0	—		1	0
FC Gifu	2012	J2 League	24	0	0	0	—		24	0
FC Gifu	2013	J2 League	29	0	1	0	—		30	0
FC Gifu	2014	J2 League	3	0	0	0	—		3	0
Career total			59	0	1	0	0	0	60	0
