= Hiroki Higuchi =

Japanese footballer (born 1992)

Hiroki Higuchi 樋口 寛規
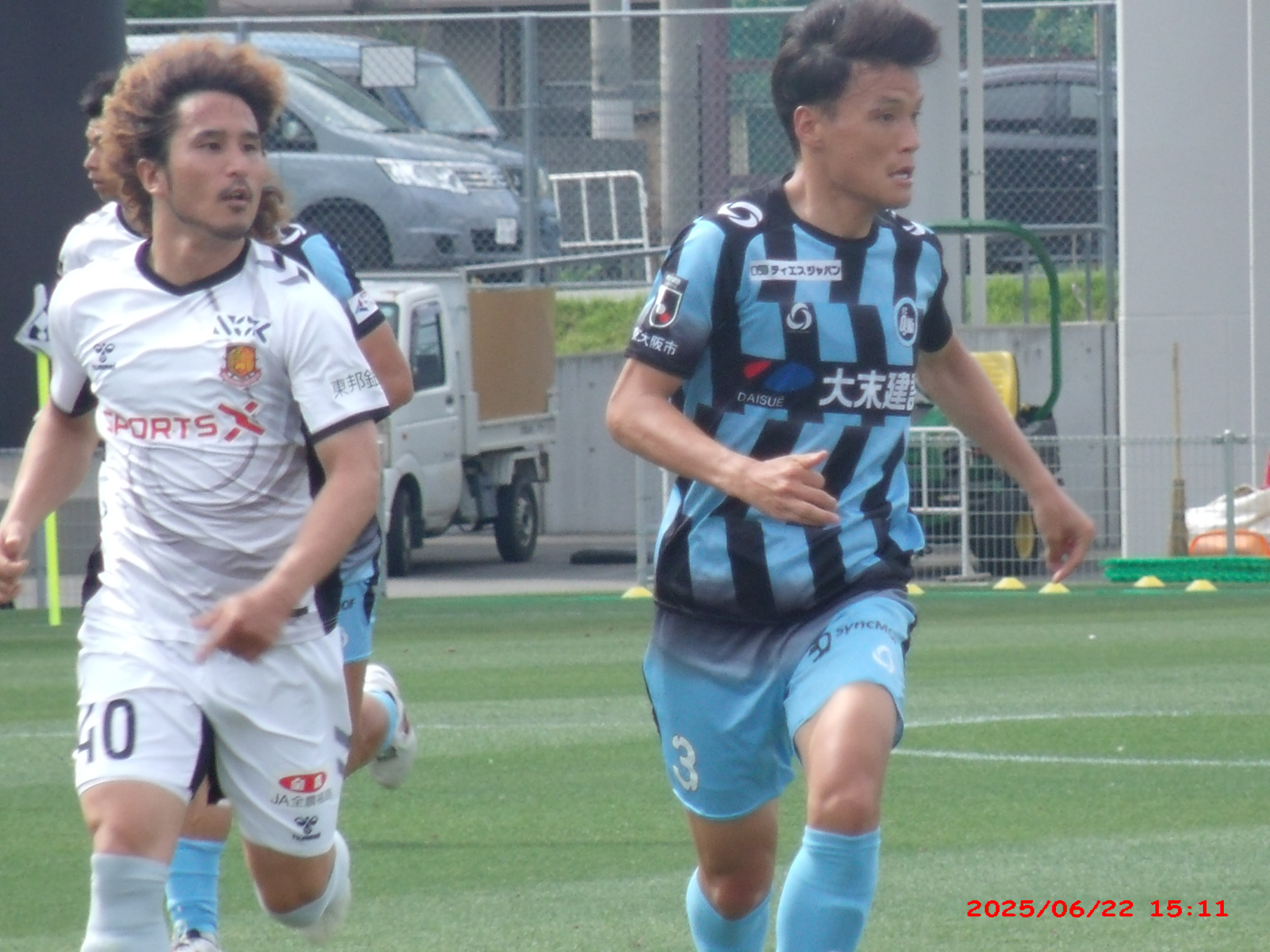

Personal information
- Full name: Hiroki Higuchi
- Date of birth: April 16, 1992 (age 34)
- Place of birth: Takarazuka, Hyōgo, Japan
- Height: 1.73 m (5 ft 8 in)
- Position: Forward

Team information
- Current team: Fukushima United FC
- Number: 40

Youth career
- –2004: Takarazuka Junior FC
- 2005–2007: Gakubun Junior High School
- 2008–2010: Takigawa Daini High School

Senior career*
Years	Team	Apps	(Gls)
2011–2015	Shimizu S-Pulse	0	(0)
2012	→ FC Gifu (loan)	34	(6)
2013	→ FC Gifu (loan)	33	(3)
2014	→ Shonan Bellmare (loan)	11	(1)
2015	→ SC Sagamihara (loan)	31	(11)
2016–	Fukushima United FC	294	(71)
Medal record
Shimizu S-Pulse
Runner-up	J.League Cup	2012
- * Club domestic league appearances and goals as of 25 August 2026

Hiroki Higuchi (樋口 寛規, born April 16, 1992) is a Japanese football player who plays as a forward for Fukushima United FC.

== Career ==
=== Shimizu S-Pulse ===
On 12 January 2011, Higuchi was announced at Shimizu S-Pulse. During this time, he appeared in the squad for the Düsseldorf International Youth Soccer Tournament.

=== First loan to FC Gifu ===
On 12 March 2012, Higuchi was announced at FC Gifu. He made his league debut against Thespa Gunma on 17 March 2012. Higuchi scored his first league goal against Shonan Bellmare on 20 March 2012, scoring in the 90th+3rd minute.

=== Second loan spell to FC Gifu ===
On 10 April 2013, Higuchi was announced at FC Gifu. He made his league debut against Matsumoto Yamaga on 14 April 2013. Higuchi scored his first league goal against Gainare Tottori on 15 June 2013, scoring in the 83rd minute.

=== Shonan Bellmare ===
On 23 July 2014, Higuchi was announced at Shonan Bellmare. He scored on his league debut against Kataller Toyama on 26 July 2014, scoring in the 86th minute.

=== Fukushima United ===
On 11 December 2023, Higuchi signed a new contract. He scored a brace against Iwate Grulla Morioka on 28 April 2024, scoring in the 28th and 45th minute.

== Club statistics ==
Updated to 23 February 2018.

Club performance			League		Cup		League Cup		Total	
Season	Club	League	Apps	Goals	Apps	Goals	Apps	Goals	Apps	Goals
Japan			League		Emperor's Cup		J. League Cup		Total	
2011	Shimizu S-Pulse	J1 League	0	0	0	0	0	0	0	0
2012	Shimizu S-Pulse	J1 League	0	0	0	0	0	0	0	0
2012	FC Gifu	J2 League	34	6	1	2	-		35	8
2013	Shimizu S-Pulse	J1 League	0	0	0	0	0	0	0	0
2013	FC Gifu	J2 League	33	3	1	0	-		34	3
2014	Shimizu S-Pulse	J1 League	0	0	0	0	0	0	0	0
2014	Shonan Bellmare	J2 League	11	1	0	0	-		11	1
2015	SC Sagamihara	J3 League	31	11	0	0	-		31	11
2016	Fukushima United FC	J3 League	30	9	2	1	-		32	10
2017	Fukushima United FC	J3 League	16	3	-		-		16	3
Total			155	33	4	3	0	0	159	36
