= Taisuke Mizuno =

Japanese footballer (born 1993)

Taisuke Mizuno 水野 泰輔
Personal information
- Full name: Taisuke Mizuno
- Date of birth: 4 May 1993 (age 33)
- Place of birth: Inuyama, Aichi, Japan
- Height: 1.70 m (5 ft 7 in)
- Position: Midfielder

Team information
- Current team: Vonds Ichihara
- Number: 15

Youth career
- Inuyama Club
- Nagoya Grampus U18

Senior career*
Years	Team	Apps	(Gls)
2012–2014	Nagoya Grampus	0	(0)
2013–2014	→ FC Gifu (loan)	41	(1)
2015–2016	FC Gifu	42	(0)
2015	→ J. League U-22 (loan)	1	(0)
2017–2021	Fujieda MYFC	115	(5)
2021–2022	Roasso Kumamoto	11	(0)
2022–2025	Fujieda MYFC	67	(6)
2024	→ FC Gifu (loan)	6	(0)
2025–	Vonds Ichihara	0	(0)
- * Club domestic league appearances and goals as of 18:46, 22 October 2024 (UTC)

Taisuke Mizuno (水野 泰輔, Mizuno Taisuke; born 4 May 1993) is a Japanese professional footballer who plays as a midfielder for Vonds Ichihara.

== Career ==
Mizuno moved up to Nagoya Grampus' first team from the youth team in January 2012. On 10 April 2013, Mizuno joined FC Gifu on loan. He made his debut on 28 April 2013, coming on as a 76th-minute substitute in his side's 1–1 draw with Montedio Yamagata. On 26 July 2024, Mizuno returned to former club FC Gifu on loan until January 2025. In January 2025, he dropped down three tiers to join Vonds Ichihara at the 5th tier playing in the Kanto Soccer League Division 1.

== Career statistics ==
Updated to 23 February 2018.

Appearances and goals by club, season and competition
Club	Season	League			Emperor's Cup		J.League Cup		Total	
Club	Season	Division	Apps	Goals	Apps	Goals	Apps	Goals	Apps	Goals
Nagoya Grampus	2012	J1 League	0	0	0	0	0	0	0	0
Nagoya Grampus	2013	J1 League	0	0	0	0	0	0	0	0
FC Gifu	2013	J2 League	10	1	0	0	—		10	1
FC Gifu	2014	J2 League	30	0	1	0	—		31	0
FC Gifu	2015	J2 League	15	0	0	0	—		15	0
FC Gifu	2016	J2 League	27	0	1	0	—		28	0
Fujieda MYFC	2017	J3 League	27	3	0	0	—		27	3
Career total			82	4	1	0	0	0	83	5
