= Masato Yamazaki (footballer, born 1990) =

Japanese footballer

Personal information
- Full name: Masato Yamazaki
- Date of birth: May 12, 1990 (age 36)
- Place of birth: Misato, Saitama, Japan
- Height: 1.71 m (5 ft 7 1/2 in)
- Position: Midfielder

Team information
- Current team: ReinMeer Aomori
- Number: 6

Youth career
- 2003–2008: Kashiwa Reysol

Senior career*
Years	Team	Apps	(Gls)
2009–2011	Kashiwa Reysol	9	(1)
2011	Fagiano Okayama	6	(1)
2012–2013	FC Gifu	13	(0)
2014–2017	YSCC Yokohama	71	(3)
2018–	ReinMeer Aomori		
Medal record
Kashiwa Reysol
Winner	J1 League	2011
Representing Japan
AFC U-16 Championship
Gold medal – first place	2006 Singapore
- * Club domestic league appearances and goals as of 8 March 2018

Masato Yamazaki (山﨑 正登, Yamazaki Masato; born May 12, 1990 in Misato, Saitama) is a Japanese football player.

== Club career statistics ==
Updated to 8 March 2018.

Club performance			League		Cup		League Cup		Total	
Season	Club	League	Apps	Goals	Apps	Goals	Apps	Goals	Apps	Goals
Japan			League		Emperor's Cup		J. League Cup		Total	
2009	Kashiwa Reysol	J1 League	1	0	1	0	4	0	6	0
2010	Kashiwa Reysol	J2 League	8	1	-		-		8	1
2011	Kashiwa Reysol	J1 League	0	0	-		0	0	0	0
2011	Fagiano Okayama	J2 League	6	1	0	0	-		6	1
2012	FC Gifu	J2 League	6	0	0	0	-		6	0
2013	FC Gifu	J2 League	7	0	0	0	-		7	0
2014	YSCC Yokohama	J3 League	24	1	2	0	-		26	1
2015	YSCC Yokohama	J3 League	16	1	-		-		16	1
2016	YSCC Yokohama	J3 League	23	1	-		-		23	1
2017	YSCC Yokohama	J3 League	8	0	1	0	-		9	0
Country	Japan		99	5	4	0	4	0	107	5
