= Koki Kotegawa =

Japanese footballer

Koki Kotegawa 小手川 宏基
Personal information
- Full name: Koki Kotegawa
- Date of birth: September 12, 1989 (age 37)
- Place of birth: Ōita, Japan
- Height: 1.73 m (5 ft 8 in)
- Position: Attacking midfielder

Team information
- Current team: Oita Trinita
- Number: 20

Youth career
- 2005–2007: Oita Trinita U-18

Senior career*
Years	Team	Apps	(Gls)
2007–2012	Oita Trinita	36	(1)
2013–2016	Giravanz Kitakyushu	166	(22)
2017–	Oita Trinita	63	(7)
Medal record
Oita Trinita
Winner	J.League Cup	2008
- * Club domestic league appearances and goals as of 7 December 2019

Koki Kotegawa (小手川 宏基, Kotegawa Kōki; born September 12, 1989 in Ōita, Ōita) is a Japanese football player currently playing for Oita Trinita.

== Club Team career statistics ==
Updated to 7 December 2019.

Club performance			League		Cup		League Cup		Other		Total	
Season	Club	League	Apps	Goals	Apps	Goals	Apps	Goals	Apps	Goals	Apps	Goals
Japan			League		Emperor's Cup		League Cup		Other^{1}		Total	
2005	Oita Trinita U-18	-	-		1	0	-		-		1	0
2007	Oita Trinita	J1 League	3	0	0	0	2	0	-		5	0
2008	Oita Trinita	J1 League	1	0	0	0	2	0	-		3	0
2009	Oita Trinita	J1 League	9	0	0	0	5	1	1	0	15	1
2010	Oita Trinita	J2 League	8	0	0	0	-		-		8	0
2011	Oita Trinita	J2 League	2	0	0	0	-		-		2	0
2012	Oita Trinita	J2 League	13	1	1	0	-		-		14	1
2013	Giravanz Kitakyushu	J2 League	41	8	2	0	-		-		43	8
2014	Giravanz Kitakyushu	J2 League	42	4	4	0	-		-		46	4
2015	Giravanz Kitakyushu	J2 League	41	8	1	0	–		–		42	8
2016	Giravanz Kitakyushu	J2 League	42	2	2	0	–		–		44	2
2017	Oita Trinita	J2 League	34	3	0	0	–		–		34	3
2018	Oita Trinita	J2 League	24	4	1	0	–		–		25	4
2019	Oita Trinita	J1 League	6	0	3	0	5	0	–		14	0
Career total			266	30	15	0	14	1	1	0	296	31

^{1}Includes Suruga Bank Championship.
