= Gifu Nagaragawa Stadium =

Multi-purpose stadium in Gifu, Japan

Coordinates: 35°26′29″N 136°45′58″E

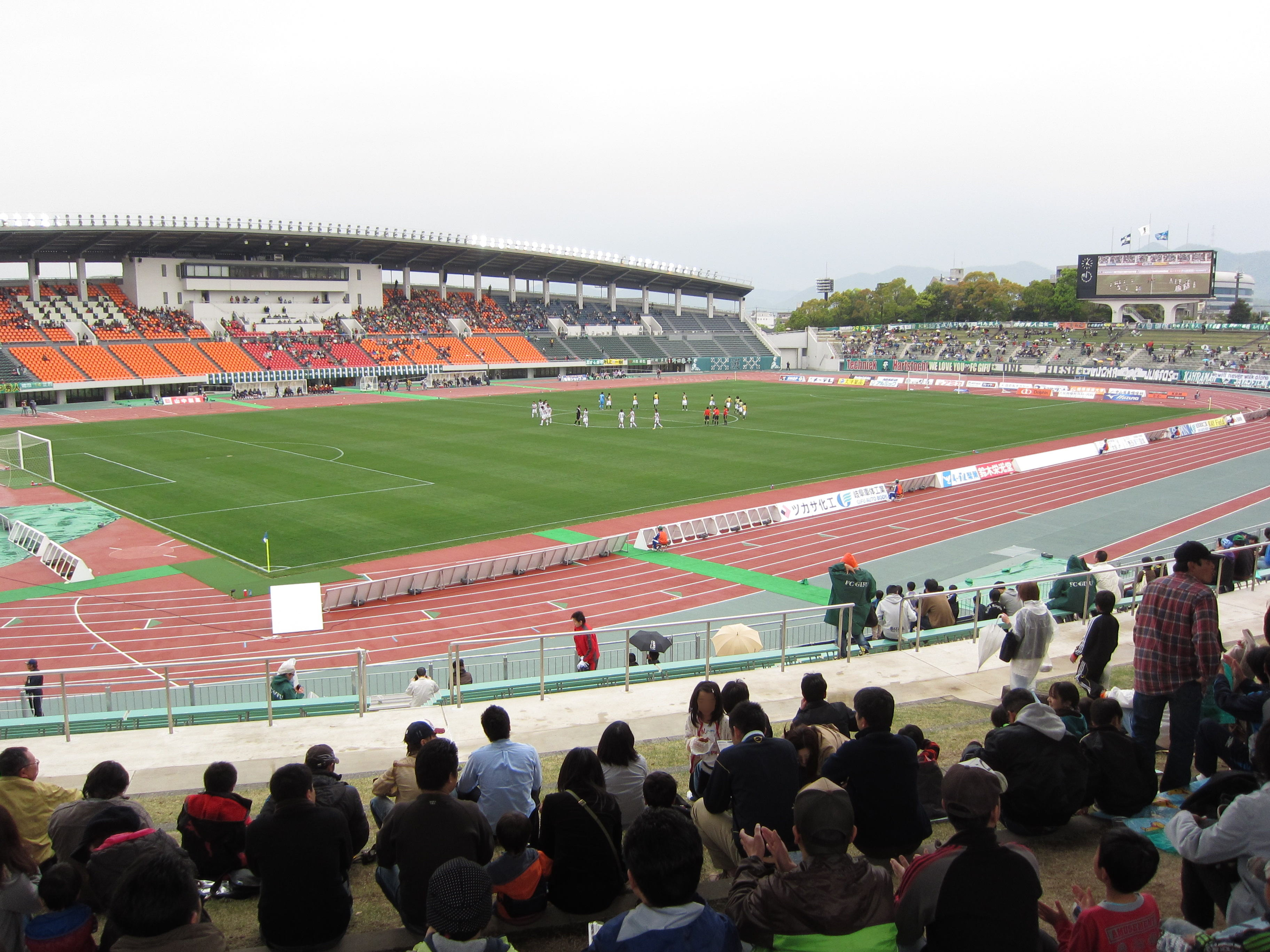
- Interactive map of Gifu Nagaragawa Stadium
- Location: Gifu, Japan
- Owner: Gifu Prefecture
- Capacity: 26,109 (since installation of new seats in 2015)

Construction
- Opened: 1991

Tenants
- FC Gifu; 2026 Asian Games

Gifu Nagaragawa Stadium (岐阜メモリアルセンター長良川競技場) is a multi-purpose stadium at the Gifu Memorial Center in Gifu, Japan. It is currently used mostly for football matches. It is the host of FC Gifu. The stadium was originally opened in 1991 and has a capacity of 26,109 which can hold up to 17,540 seating spectators.

It serves as the start and finish point for the annual Gifu Seiryu Half Marathon every May.
