= Takashi Kasahara (footballer, born 1988) =

Japanese footballer (born 1988)

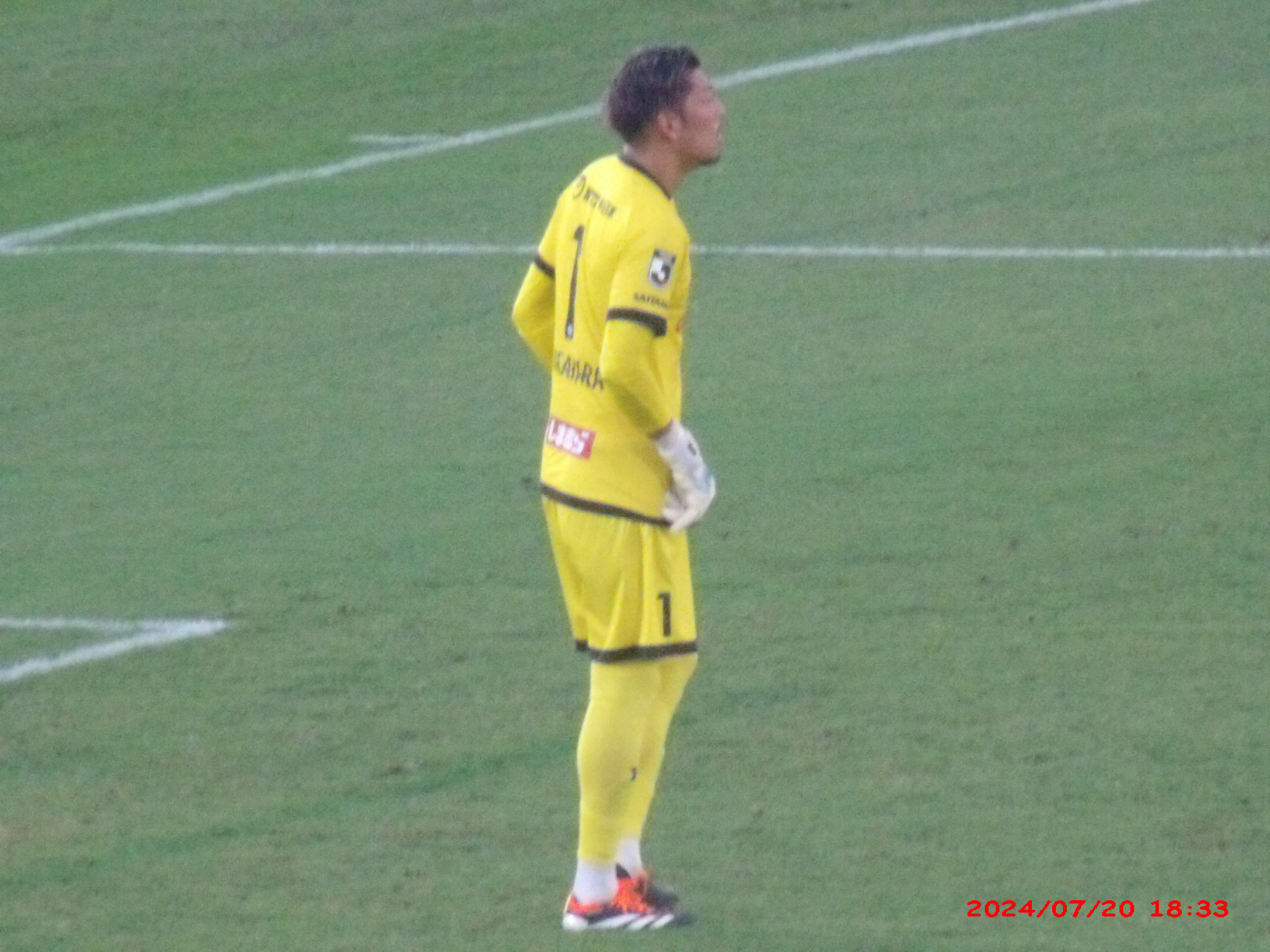
- Kasahara with Omiya Ardija in 2024

Personal information
- Full name: Takashi Kasahara
- Date of birth: 21 November 1988 (age 37)
- Place of birth: Saitama, Japan
- Height: 1.91 m (6 ft 3 in)
- Position: Goalkeeper

Team information
- Current team: RB Omiya Ardija
- Number: 1

Youth career
- Konan Minami SSS
- 2001–2003: Kumagaya SSC
- 2004–2006: Ichiritsu Funabashi High School

College career
Years	Team	Apps	(Gls)
2007–2010	Meiji University		

Senior career*
Years	Team	Apps	(Gls)
2011–2017	Mito HollyHock	98	(0)
2018–	Omiya Ardija / RB Omiya Ardija	192	(0)
2022	→ V-Varen Nagasaki (loan)	8	(0)
- * Club domestic league appearances and goals as of 20:54, 10 June 2026 (UTC)

Takashi Kasahara (笠原 昂史, Kasahara Takashi; born 21 November 1988) is a Japanese professional footballer who plays as a goalkeeper for J2 League club RB Omiya Ardija.

== Career ==
Kasahara made his debut for Mito HollyHock in the Emperor's Cup match against Oita Trinita on 9 September 2012.

== Career statistics ==
As of match played 9 May 2026

Appearances and goals by club, season and competition
Club	Season	League			Emperor's Cup		J.League Cup		Other		Total	
Club	Season	Division	Apps	Goals	Apps	Goals	Apps	Goals	Apps	Goals	Apps	Goals
Mito HollyHock	2011	J2 League	0	0	0	0	—		—		0	0
Mito HollyHock	2012	J2 League	0	0	1	0	—		—		1	0
Mito HollyHock	2013	J2 League	15	0	1	0	—		—		16	0
Mito HollyHock	2014	J2 League	11	0	2	0	—		—		13	0
Mito HollyHock	2015	J2 League	8	0	2	0	—		—		10	0
Mito HollyHock	2016	J2 League	22	0	0	0	—		—		22	0
Mito HollyHock	2017	J2 League	42	0	0	0	—		—		42	0
Mito HollyHock	Total		98	0	6	0	—		—		104	0
RB Omiya Ardija	2018	J2 League	32	0	0	0	—		0	0	32	0
RB Omiya Ardija	2019	J2 League	27	0	0	0	—		1 (Note: Appearance in J2 League promotion play-offs)	0	28	0
RB Omiya Ardija	2020	J2 League	20	0	0	0	—		—		20	0
RB Omiya Ardija	2021	J2 League	6	0	0	0	—		—		6	0
RB Omiya Ardija	2023	J2 League	33	0	0	0	—		—		33	0
RB Omiya Ardija	2024	J3 League	38	0	0	0	0	0	—		38	0
RB Omiya Ardija	2025	J2 League	33	0	0	0	0	0	0	0	33	0
RB Omiya Ardija	2026	J2/J3	3	0	—		—		—		3	0
RB Omiya Ardija	Total		192	0	0	0	0	0	1	0	193	0
V-Varen Nagasaki (loan)	2022	J2 League	8	0	0	0	—		—		8	0
Career total			298	0	6	0	—		1	0	305	0

== Honours ==
RB Omiya Ardija

- J3 League: 2024

Individual

- J3 League Best XI: 2024
