= 2012 Mito HollyHock season =

Mito HollyHock
2012 season
- Manager: Tetsuji Hashiratani
- J.League Division 2: -
- Emperor's Cup: -
Home colours	Away colours

The 2012 Mito HollyHock season sees Mito HollyHock compete in J.League Division 2 for the 13th consecutive season and 15th second-tier season overall. Mito HollyHock are also competing in the 2012 Emperor's Cup.

== Competitions ==
=== J. League ===
==== League table ====
Pos	Team	Pld	W	D	L	GF	GA	GD	Pts
11	Tochigi SC	42	17	9	16	50	49	+1	60
12	Matsumoto Yamaga	42	15	14	13	46	43	+3	59
13	Mito HollyHock	42	15	11	16	47	49	−2	56
14	Roasso Kumamoto	42	15	10	17	40	48	−8	55
15	Tokushima Vortis	42	13	12	17	45	49	−4	51

Updated to match(es) played on 11 November 2012. Source: J.League Division 2
Rules for classification: 1st points; 2nd goal differential; 3rd goals scored; 4th head-to-head results; 5th disciplinary points; 6th draw. If two clubs are tied for first place, both clubs will be declared champions.

==== Matches ====
4 March 2012 1	Mito HollyHock	2 - 1	Yokohama F.C.	K's denki Stadium Mito
Sunday 13:05	Ozawa 42'; Shimada 69'	Report	10' Okubo	Attendance: 5,817; Referee: Kawai

11 March 2012 2	Mito HollyHock	1 - 0	Kataller Toyama	K's denki Stadium Mito
Sunday 13:04	Ozawa 26'	Report		Attendance: 2,601; Referee: Mikami

17 March 2012 3	Fagiano Okayama	0 - 3	Mito HollyHock	Kanko Stadium
Saturday 18:33		Report	2', 33' Suzuki; 55' Hashimoto	Attendance: 5,576; Referee: Onishi

20 March 2012 4	Giravanz Kitakyushu	1 - 0	Mito HollyHock	Honjo Stadium
Tuesday 16:03	Watari 51'	Report		Attendance: 2,558; Referee: Ueda

24 March 2012 5	Mito HollyHock	0 - 0	Matsumoto Yamaga	K's denki Stadium Mito
Saturday 13:04		Report		Attendance: 2,952; Referee: Hidaka

1 April 2012 6	Montedio Yamagata	0 - 0	Mito HollyHock	NDsoft Stadium Yamagata
Sunday 13:04		Report		Attendance: 6,179; Referee: Hayakawa

8 April 2012 7	Mito HollyHock	0 - 1	JEF United Ichihara Chiba	K's denki Stadium Mito
Sunday 14:00	Wako (yellow card) 16'; Shimada (yellow card) 61'; Homma (yellow card) 64'; Suzuki (yellow card) 74'; Shiotani (yellow card) 90+1'	Report	Tanaka 71' (yellow card) 85'	Attendance: 5,373; Referee: (Japan) Eiji Kawai

15 April 2012 8	Avispa Fukuoka	1 - 1	Mito HollyHock	Level-5 Stadium
Sunday 17:00	Sakata 5'; Suzuki (yellow card) 11'; Naruoka (yellow card) 17'; Tokio Hatamoto (yellow card) 31'; Kim Min-Je (yellow card) 69' (yellow-red card) 90+2'	Report	Nishioka (yellow card) 48'; Ozawa 65'; Hashimoto (yellow card) 88'	Attendance: 4,878; Referee: (Japan) Naohito Ogawa

22 April 2012 9	Mito HollyHock	1 - 0	Thespa Kusatsu	K's denki Stadium Mito
Sunday 14:00	Shiotani 36'; Frank (yellow card) 54'; Suzuki (red card) 62'	Report	Matsushita (yellow card) 20'; Sakurada (yellow card) 27' (yellow-red card) 63'; Hozaki (yellow card) 34'; Kumabayashi (yellow card) 89'	Attendance: 3,999; Referee: (Japan) Akihiko Ikeuchi

27 April 2012 10	Shonan Bellmare	1 - 2	Mito HollyHock	Shonan BMW Stadium Hiratsuka
Friday 20:00	Kobayashi (yellow card) 22'; Baba 38' (yellow card) 64'; Furuhashi (yellow card) 54'; Ono (yellow card) 80'	Report	Frank 6'; Omoto (yellow card) 47'; Nishioka (yellow card) 62'; Shimada 87'	Attendance: 4,850; Referee: (Japan) Hiromichi Oka

30 April 2012 11	Mito HollyHock	2 - 1	Tokushima Vortis	K's denki Stadium Mito
Monday 14:00	Kato 37'; Suzuki (yellow card) 67'; Wako (yellow card) 76'; Nishioka (yellow card) 85' (goal) 89'; Homma (yellow card) 87'; Ichikawa (yellow card) 90+1'	Report	Eto (yellow card) 34'; Nishijima (yellow card) 36'; Tokushige 90+2'; Miki (yellow card) 90+5'	Attendance: 4,222; Referee: (Japan) Jumpei Iida

3 May 2012 12	F.C. Gifu	0 - 1	Mito HollyHock	Gifu Nagaragawa Stadium
Thursday 20:00	Koichi Sato (yellow card) 42'; Ri Han-Jae (yellow card) 73'	Report	Frank 16'; Omoto (yellow card) 86'	Attendance: 5,232; Referee: (Japan) Hiroshi Yamauchi

6 May 2012 13	Mito HollyHock	0 - 2	Tokyo Verdy	K's denki Stadium Mito
Sunday 20:00	Suzuki (yellow card) 29'; Kim Yong-Gi (yellow card) 40' (yellow-red card) 58'; Kanakubo (yellow card) 64'; Nishioka (yellow card) 66'; Wako (yellow card) 90+5'	Report	Iio (yellow card) 36'; Nishi 85'; Kajikawa 88'	Attendance: 4,170; Referee: (Japan) Haruki Hidaka

13 May 2012 14	Gainare Tottori	2 - 1	Mito HollyHock	Tottori Bank Bird Stadium
Sunday 17:00	Mio 42'; Mizumoto (yellow card) 50' (yellow-red card) 65'; Koide 52'; Okuyama (yellow card) 90+1'	Report	Frank (yellow card) 59'; Okamoto 71'; Yoshihara (yellow card) 90+2'	Attendance: 2,501; Referee: (Japan) Shoichiro Mikami

20 May 2012 15	Mito HollyHock	0 - 2	Ehime F.C.	K's denki Stadium Mito
Sunday 14:00	Wako (yellow card) 53'; Suzuki (yellow card) 85'; Nishioka (yellow card) 90+2'	Report	Ishii (yellow card) 33'; Maeno 39'; Urata (yellow card) 60'; Arita 77'	Attendance: 4,303; Referee: (Japan) Koji Morikawa

27 May 2012 16	Machida Zelvia	0 - 0	Mito HollyHock	Machida Athletic Stadium
Sunday 17:00	Tashiro (yellow card) 90+4'	Report	Omoto (yellow card) 58'	Attendance: 3,642; Referee: (Japan) Kazuyoshi Enomoto

2 June 2012 17	Mito HollyHock	3 - 1	Tochigi S.C.	K's denki Stadium Mito
Sunday 14:00	Shiotani 43'; Ozawa 50'; Shimada 73'; Frank (yellow card) 80'	Report	Kan (yellow card) 66'; Sugimoto 90+4'	Attendance: 4,413; Referee: (Japan) Yoshiro Imamura

7 June 2012 18	Roasso Kumamoto	2 - 1	Mito HollyHock	Kumamoto Athletics Stadium
Thursday 20:00	Takahashi 2' (yellow card) 4'; Taketomi 28'; Hiroi (yellow card) 62'; Kurakawa (yellow card) 76'	Report	Okamoto 88'	Attendance: 3,127; Referee: (Japan) Taku Nagaya

13 June 2012 19	Mito HollyHock	1 - 3	Ventforet Kofu	K's denki Stadium Mito
Wednesday 20:00	Omoto (yellow card) 4' (yellow-red card) 73'; Shiotani (yellow card) 51'; Hashimoto 72'	Report	Choi Sung-Kuen (yellow card) 48'; Homma 68' (o.g.); Tsuda (yellow card) 70'; Davi 74' (pen.) 90'; Horigome (yellow card) 82'	Attendance: 2,241; Referee: (Japan) Toshimitsu Yoshida

17 June 2012 20	Oita Trinita	1 - 0	Mito HollyHock	Ōita Bank Dome
Sunday 19:00	Miyazawa (yellow card) 26'; Lee Dong-Myung 90'	Report		Attendance: 6,459; Referee: (Japan) Naohito Ogawa
