= Koji Homma =

Japanese footballer

Koji Homma 本間 幸司
Personal information
- Full name: Koji Homma
- Date of birth: 27 April 1977 (age 49)
- Place of birth: Hitachi, Ibaraki, Japan
- Height: 1.85 m (6 ft 1 in)
- Position: Goalkeeper

Youth career
- 1993–1995: Mito Junior College High School

Senior career*
Years	Team	Apps	(Gls)
1996–1999	Urawa Red Diamonds	0	(0)
1999–2024	Mito HollyHock	581	(0)
Total		581	(0)
- * Club domestic league appearances and goals as of 3 November 2024, 11:27 (UTC)

Koji Homma (本間 幸司, Honma Kōji; born April 27, 1977) is a Japanese former football player. He last plays for J2 League club Mito HollyHock until he retirement in 2024. He holds the ongoing record for playing in the most games in J2.

== Playing career ==
Honma was born in Hitachi on April 27, 1977. After graduating from high school, he joined the J1 League club Urawa Reds in 1996. However he played less often than Yuki Takita and Hisashi Tsuchida. In the middle of 1999, Homma moved to the Japan Football League club Mito HollyHock based in his local Ibaraki Prefecture. He became a regular goalkeeper soon afterward. HollyHock won third place in the 1999 season and was promoted to the J2 League in 2000. Although the club results were sluggish in J2, he played as a regular goalkeeper for a long time. On August 14, 2014, he became the first player to have participated in 500 matches in the J2 League. However his opportunity to play decreased behind Takashi Kasahara in the summer of 2016.

On 25 September 2024, Homma announcement officially retirement from football at the end of 2024 season after 28 years as goalkeeper.

== Club statistics ==
As of 3 November 2024.

Club performance			League		Cup		League Cup		Total	
Season	Club	League	Apps	Goals	Apps	Goals	Apps	Goals	Apps	Goals
Japan			League		Emperor's Cup		J.League Cup		Total	
1996	Urawa Red Diamonds	J1 League	0	0	0	0	0	0	0	0
1997	Urawa Red Diamonds	J1 League	0	0	0	0	0	0	0	0
1998	Urawa Red Diamonds	J1 League	0	0	0	0	0	0	0	0
1999	Urawa Red Diamonds	J1 League	0	0	0	0	0	0	0	0
Total			0	0	0	0	0	0	0	0
1999	Mito HollyHock	JFL	24	0	3	0	-		27	0
2000	Mito HollyHock	J2 League	40	0	3	0	1	0	44	0
2001	Mito HollyHock	J2 League	31	0	1	0	2	0	34	0
2002	Mito HollyHock	J2 League	28	0	0	0	-		28	0
2003	Mito HollyHock	J2 League	31	0	3	0	-		34	0
2004	Mito HollyHock	J2 League	28	0	1	0	-		29	0
2005	Mito HollyHock	J2 League	41	0	2	0	-		43	0
2006	Mito HollyHock	J2 League	13	0	1	0	-		14	0
2007	Mito HollyHock	J2 League	35	0	0	0	-		35	0
2008	Mito HollyHock	J2 League	42	0	2	0	-		44	0
2009	Mito HollyHock	J2 League	50	0	0	0	-		50	0
2010	Mito HollyHock	J2 League	33	0	2	0	-		35	0
2011	Mito HollyHock	J2 League	35	0	3	0	-		38	0
2012	Mito HollyHock	J2 League	42	0	1	0	-		43	0
2013	Mito HollyHock	J2 League	28	0	1	0	-		29	0
2014	Mito HollyHock	J2 League	31	0	0	0	-		31	0
2015	Mito HollyHock	J2 League	35	0	1	0	-		36	0
2016	Mito HollyHock	J2 League	20	0	2	0	-		22	0
2017	Mito HollyHock	J2 League	0	0	1	0	-		1	0
2018	Mito HollyHock	J2 League	11	0	1	0	-		12	0
2019	Mito HollyHock	J2 League	0	0	0	0	-		0	0
2020	Mito HollyHock	J2 League	1	0	-		-		1	0
2021	Mito HollyHock	J2 League	-		-		-		0	0
2022	Mito HollyHock	J2 League	0	0	1	0	-		1	0
2023	Mito HollyHock	J2 League	1	0	-		-		1	0
2024	Mito HollyHock	J2 League	1	0	-		-		1	0
Total			581	0	19	0	3	0	603	0
Career total			581	0	19	0	3	0	603	0
