= 2018 Mito HollyHock season =

Mito HollyHock
2018 season
- Manager: Shigetoshi Hasebe
- Stadium: K's denki Stadium Mito
- J2 League: 10th
- Emperors's Cup: 3rd round
Home colours	Away colours

2018 Mito HollyHock season.

== Squad ==
As of 30 January 2018.

Note: Flags indicate national team as defined under FIFA eligibility rules; some limited exceptions apply. Players may hold more than one non-FIFA nationality.

No.	Pos.	Nation	Player
1	GK	JPN	Koji Homma
2	DF	JPN	Taiki Tamukai
3	DF	JPN	Takuma Hamasaki
4	DF	JPN	Uduka Boniface
5	DF	JPN	Makito Ito
6	DF	BRA	Diego
7	MF	JPN	Keisuke Funatani (captain)
8	MF	JPN	Hiroyuki Mae
9	FW	BRA	Jefferson Baiano
10	MF	JPN	Yuji Kimura
13	MF	JPN	Keita Tanaka
14	MF	JPN	Sho Sato
15	FW	JPN	Takuya Miyamoto
17	DF	JPN	Daisuke Tomita
18	MF	JPN	Eiji Shirai
19	MF	JPN	Yuichi Hirano

No.	Pos.	Nation	Player
21	GK	JPN	Kei Koizumi
22	MF	JPN	Yosuke Nakagawa
23	MF	JPN	Ryo Toyama
24	DF	JPN	Junya Hosokawa
26	MF	JPN	Masato Kojima
31	GK	JPN	Ryo Hasegawa
32	MF	JPN	Atsushi Kurokawa
33	DF	JPN	Ryoji Fukui
35	DF	JPN	Shoki Ohara
39	MF	JPN	Ryuya Motoda
40	FW	JPN	Takeru Kishimoto
44	DF	JPN	Yuto Nagasaka
46	MF	JPN	Ryotaro Ito
49	FW	JPN	Keita Saito
50	GK	JPN	Kenya Matsui

=== Out on loan ===
Note: Flags indicate national team as defined under FIFA eligibility rules; some limited exceptions apply. Players may hold more than one non-FIFA nationality.

No.	Pos.	Nation	Player
—	GK	JPN	Ryo Ishii (on loan to (Japan) Fukushima United FC)
—	DF	JPN	Junya Imase (on loan to (Japan) Kataller Toyama)
—	DF	JPN	Takaaki Kinoshita (on loan to (Japan) Fujieda MYFC)

== J2 League ==
Match	Date	Team	Score	Team	Venue	Attendance
1	2018.02.25	Mito HollyHock	3-0	Montedio Yamagata	K's denki Stadium Mito	7,858
2	2018.03.04	JEF United Chiba	0-0	Mito HollyHock	Fukuda Denshi Arena	11,285
3	2018.03.11	Kamatamare Sanuki	1-2	Mito HollyHock	Pikara Stadium	2,693
4	2018.03.17	Mito HollyHock	3-0	Renofa Yamaguchi FC	K's denki Stadium Mito	4,457
5	2018.03.21	Oita Trinita	3-1	Mito HollyHock	Oita Bank Dome	6,133
6	2018.03.25	Mito HollyHock	0-0	Yokohama FC	K's denki Stadium Mito	6,300
7	2018.04.01	Mito HollyHock	0-1	FC Machida Zelvia	K's denki Stadium Mito	4,717
8	2018.04.07	Ventforet Kofu	1-1	Mito HollyHock	Yamanashi Chuo Bank Stadium	6,741
9	2018.04.15	Mito HollyHock	1-0	Zweigen Kanazawa	K's denki Stadium Mito	2,736
10	2018.04.21	Tokyo Verdy	3-0	Mito HollyHock	Ajinomoto Field Nishigaoka	3,726
11	2018.04.28	Mito HollyHock	1-2	Kyoto Sanga FC	K's denki Stadium Mito	4,366
12	2018.05.03	Matsumoto Yamaga FC	2-0	Mito HollyHock	Matsumotodaira Park Stadium	15,110
13	2018.05.06	Mito HollyHock	0-1	Tokushima Vortis	K's denki Stadium Mito	3,605
14	2018.05.13	Mito HollyHock	3-0	Fagiano Okayama	K's denki Stadium Mito	3,502
15	2018.05.20	Roasso Kumamoto	2-1	Mito HollyHock	Kumamoto Suizenji Stadium	3,206
16	2018.05.27	Mito HollyHock	0-2	Avispa Fukuoka	K's denki Stadium Mito	4,592
17	2018.06.02	FC Gifu	4-0	Mito HollyHock	Gifu Nagaragawa Stadium	7,668
18	2018.06.10	Tochigi SC	1-2	Mito HollyHock	Tochigi Green Stadium	3,960
19	2018.06.16	Mito HollyHock	1-2	Omiya Ardija	K's denki Stadium Mito	5,468
20	2018.06.23	Ehime FC	0-1	Mito HollyHock	Ningineer Stadium	2,449
21	2018.06.30	Albirex Niigata	1-1	Mito HollyHock	Denka Big Swan Stadium	15,759
22	2018.07.07	Mito HollyHock	5-0	Kamatamare Sanuki	K's denki Stadium Mito	3,884
23	2018.07.16	Kyoto Sanga FC	0-1	Mito HollyHock	Kyoto Nishikyogoku Athletic Stadium	3,302
24	2018.07.21	Renofa Yamaguchi FC	2-2	Mito HollyHock	Ishin Me-Life Stadium	4,909
25	2018.07.25	Mito HollyHock	0-0	Tochigi SC	K's denki Stadium Mito	5,002
26	2018.07.29	Mito HollyHock	4-1	Ehime FC	K's denki Stadium Mito	3,615
27	2018.08.04	Tokushima Vortis	1-0	Mito HollyHock	Pocarisweat Stadium	4,457
28	2018.08.11	Avispa Fukuoka	2-0	Mito HollyHock	Level5 Stadium	9,012
29	2018.08.18	Mito HollyHock	1-0	JEF United Chiba	K's denki Stadium Mito	6,122
30	2018.08.26	Fagiano Okayama	0-1	Mito HollyHock	City Light Stadium	8,300
31	2018.09.01	Mito HollyHock	1-1	Matsumoto Yamaga FC	K's denki Stadium Mito	6,351
32	2018.09.09	FC Machida Zelvia	0-0	Mito HollyHock	Machida Stadium	3,737
33	2018.09.16	Yokohama FC	1-2	Mito HollyHock	NHK Spring Mitsuzawa Football Stadium	7,976
34	2018.09.23	Mito HollyHock	0-1	Albirex Niigata	K's denki Stadium Mito	7,110
35	2018.09.29	Mito HollyHock	1-2	Oita Trinita	K's denki Stadium Mito	4,001
36	2018.10.06	Omiya Ardija	2-1	Mito HollyHock	NACK5 Stadium Omiya	7,537
37	2018.10.14	Mito HollyHock	0-1	Tokyo Verdy	K's denki Stadium Mito	4,100
38	2018.10.21	Mito HollyHock	3-2	Roasso Kumamoto	K's denki Stadium Mito	4,055
39	2018.10.28	Montedio Yamagata	0-1	Mito HollyHock	ND Soft Stadium Yamagata	5,692
40	2018.11.04	Mito HollyHock	2-0	Ventforet Kofu	K's denki Stadium Mito	4,801
41	2018.11.11	Mito HollyHock	1-1	FC Gifu	K's denki Stadium Mito	7,056
42	2018.11.17	Zweigen Kanazawa	3-1	Mito HollyHock	Ishikawa Athletics Stadium	4,479
