= Takayuki Suzuki =

Japanese footballer

Takayuki Suzuki 鈴木 隆行
Personal information
- Date of birth: 5 June 1976 (age 50)
- Place of birth: Hitachi, Ibaraki, Japan
- Height: 1.82 m (6 ft 0 in)
- Position: Forward

Youth career
- 1992–1994: Hitachi Kogyo High School

Senior career*
Years	Team	Apps	(Gls)
1995–2005	Kashima Antlers	87	(17)
1997	→ CFZ (loan)	21	(7)
1998	→ JEF United Ichihara (loan)	7	(0)
1999	→ CFZ (loan)	5	(0)
2000	→ Kawasaki Frontale (loan)	11	(0)
2002–2003	→ Genk (loan)	19	(0)
2003–2004	→ Heusden-Zolder (loan)	30	(5)
2006	Red Star Belgrade	6	(0)
2007	Yokohama F. Marinos	3	(0)
2008–2010	Portland Timbers	77	(4)
2011–2014	Mito HollyHock	126	(24)
2015	JEF United Chiba	2	(0)
Total		394	(57)

International career
2001–2005	Japan	55	(11)
Medal record
Men's football
Representing Japan
AFC Asian Cup
Winner	2004 China
FIFA Confederations Cup
Runner-up	2001 Korea/Japan
- * Club domestic league appearances and goals

Takayuki Suzuki (鈴木 隆行, Suzuki Takayuki; born 5 June 1976) is a Japanese former professional footballer who played as a forward. He made over 50 appearances for the Japan national team and he played professionally for two decades in Japan, Brazil, Belgium, Serbia and the United States.

== Club career ==
Suzuki has spent the majority of his playing career with Kashima Antlers, playing six stints for the team over the course of ten years, in between short periods playing in Brazil and Belgium. Suzuki played 87 games in the J1 League for Kashima, scoring 17 goals, and helping the team win the J1 Championship in 1996, 1998, 2000 and 2001.

Takayuki Suzuki had not scored for 1790 minutes/46 games consecutive, until he scored a goal against RSC Anderlecht in September 2003.

On 28 January 2006, Suzuki signed with Red Star Belgrade during the 2005–06 season winter break at the period Toyota was the main sponsor of the club. However, Suzuki's time in Serbia was a disappointment and his move back to J1 League to join Yokohama F. Marinos was announced on 19 January 2007.

On 28 March 2008, it was revealed that he signed a one-year contract with Portland Timbers of the USL First Division, joining on a free transfer.

On 8 June 2011, Suzuki agreed to join J2 League side Mito HollyHock. With the club and city in financial difficult following the 2011 Tōhoku earthquake and tsunami, he promised to play for free in the 2011 season.

After one season with JEF United Chiba, he announced his retirement from football at the age of 39.

== International career ==
Suzuki made his international debut for Japan national team in 2001, and scored his first international goal on 2 June 2001, in a 2001 Confederations Cup game against Cameroon.

He played all four of Japan's games at the 2002 World Cup on home soil, starting the first three and scoring in the 2–2 tie against Belgium; Japan were eliminated in the round of 16 following a 1–0 defeat to Turkey.

He was also part of the Japanese team which won the 2004 Asian Cup. He played 55 games and scored 11 goals for Japan until 2005.

== Career statistics ==
=== Club ===
Appearances and goals by club, season and competition
Club	Season	League			National cup		League cup		Continental		Total	
Club	Season	Division	Apps	Goals	Apps	Goals	Apps	Goals	Apps	Goals	Apps	Goals
Kashima Antlers	1995	J1 League	0	0	0	0	–		–		0	0
Kashima Antlers	1996	J1 League	1	0	0	0	0	0	–		1	0
Kashima Antlers	1997	J1 League	0	0	0	0	0	0	–		0	0
Kashima Antlers	1998	J1 League	3	1	0	0	1	0	–		4	1
Kashima Antlers	1999	J1 League	1	0	0	0	3	0	–		4	0
Kashima Antlers	2000	J1 League	5	2	5	2	5	3	–		15	7
Kashima Antlers	2001	J1 League	26	6	3	4	6	1	–		35	11
Kashima Antlers	2002	J1 League	8	0	0	0	0	0	–		8	0
Kashima Antlers	2003	J1 League	4	0	0	0	0	0	0	0	4	0
Kashima Antlers	2004	J1 League	14	5	3	0	0	0	–		17	5
Kashima Antlers	2005	J1 League	25	3	3	0	0	0	–		28	3
Kashima Antlers	Total		87	17	14	6	15	4	0	0	116	27
Centro Futebol Zico (loan)	1997	Campeonato Carioca 3°	21	7	–		–		–		21	7
JEF United Ichihara (loan)	1998	J1 League	7	0	1	0	0	0	–		8	0
Centro Futebol Zico (loan)	1999	Campeonato Carioca 2°	5	0	–		–		–		5	0
Kawasaki Frontale (loan)	2000	J1 League	11	0	0	0	2	0	–		13	0
Genk (loan)	2002–03	Belgian First Division	19	0	2	0	–		6	0	27	0
Heusden-Zolder (loan)	2003–04	Belgian First Division	30	5	4	2	–		–		34	7
Red Star Belgrade	2005–06	Serbian SuperLiga	6	0	1	2	–		–		7	2
Red Star Belgrade	2006–07	Serbian SuperLiga	0	0	2	0	–		–		2	0
Red Star Belgrade	Total		6	0	3	2	0	0	0	0	9	2
Yokohama F. Marinos	2007	J1 League	3	0	0	0	1	0	–		4	0
Portland Timbers	2008	USL First Division	26	1	1	0	–		–		27	1
Portland Timbers	2009	USL First Division	27	2	2	0	–		–		29	2
Portland Timbers	2010	D2 Pro League	24	1	2	1	–		–		26	2
Portland Timbers	Total		77	4	5	1	–		–		82	5
Mito HollyHock	2011	J2 League	20	5	3	1	–		–		23	6
Mito HollyHock	2012	J2 League	36	4	2	0	–		–		38	4
Mito HollyHock	2013	J2 League	37	12	1	0	–		–		38	12
Mito HollyHock	2014	J2 League	33	3	2	0	–		–		35	3
Mito HollyHock	Total		126	24	8	1	0	0	0	0	134	25
JEF United Chiba	2015	J2 League	2	0	0	0	–		–		2	0
Career total			394	57	37	12	18	4	6	0	455	73

=== International ===
Appearances and goals by national team and year
National team	Year	Apps	Goals
Japan	2001	10	3
Japan	2002	13	1
Japan	2003	4	0
Japan	2004	18	6
Japan	2005	10	1
Total		55	11

Scores and results list Japan's goal tally first, score column indicates score after each Suzuki goal.

List of international goals scored by Takayuki Suzuki
No.	Date	Venue	Opponent	Score	Result	Competition	Ref.
1	2 June 2001	Niigata Stadium, Niigata, Japan	Cameroon	1–0	2–0	2001 FIFA Confederations Cup	
2	2 June 2001	Niigata Stadium, Niigata, Japan	Cameroon	2–0	2–0	2001 FIFA Confederations Cup	
3	7 October 2001	St Mary's Stadium, Southampton, England	Nigeria	2–1	2–2	Friendly	
4	4 June 2002	Saitama Stadium 2002, Saitama, Japan	Belgium	1–1	2–2	2002 FIFA World Cup	
5	9 June 2004	Saitama Stadium 2002, Saitama, Japan	India	4–0	7–0	2006 FIFA World Cup qualification	
6	9 July 2004	Hiroshima Big Stadium, Hiroshima, Japan	Slovakia	2–1	3–1	Friendly	
7	31 July 2004	Chongqing Olympic Sports Center, Chongqing, China	Jordan	1–1	1–1	2004 AFC Asian Cup	
8	18 August 2004	Shizuoka Stadium, Fukuroi, Japan	Argentina	1–2	1–2	Friendly	
9	8 September 2004	Salt Lake Stadium, Bidhannagar, India	India	1–0	4–0	2006 FIFA World Cup qualification	
10	13 October 2004	Sultan Qaboos Sports Complex, Muscat, Oman	Oman	1–0	1–0	2006 FIFA World Cup qualification	
11	2 February 2005	Saitama Stadium 2002, Saitama, Japan	Syria	1–0	3–0	Friendly	

== Honours ==
Kashima Antlers

- J1 League: 1996, 1998, 2000, 2001

CFZ

- Campeonato Carioca Série B1: 1997

Genk

- Belgian Supercup runner-up: 2002

Red Star Belgrade

- Serbian Superliga: 2005–06, 2006–07
- Serbian Cup: 2006–07

Portland Timbers

- USL First Division Commissioner's Cup: 2009

Japan

- AFC Asian Cup: 2004
- FIFA Confederations Cup runner-up: 2001

Individual

- FIFA Confederations Cup Silver Shoe: 2001

== Trivia ==
- Takayuki Suzuki is featured on the 2001 PlayStation 2 game cover Jikkyou J. League Perfect Striker 4 (whose engine served as the basis for International Superstar Soccer 2) together with Shunsuke Nakamura and Atsuhiro Miura.
