= 2017 Ehime FC season =

Ehime FC
2017 season
- Manager: Shuichi Mase
- Stadium: Ningineer Stadium
- J2 League: 15th

2017 Ehime FC season.

== J2 League ==
=== League table ===
Pos	Team	Pld	W	D	L	GF	GA	GD	Pts
14	Mito HollyHock	42	14	12	16	45	48	−3	54
15	Ehime FC	42	14	9	19	54	68	−14	51
16	Machida Zelvia	42	11	17	14	53	53	0	50

Updated to match(es) played on 28 November 2017. Source: 2017 MEIJI YASUDA J2 LEAGUE League table
Rules for classification: 1) Points; 2) Goal difference; 3) Goals scored

=== Match details ===
J2 League match details
Match	Date	Team	Score	Team	Venue	Attendance
1	2017.02.26	Ehime FC	1-0	Zweigen Kanazawa	Ningineer Stadium	5,715
2	2017.03.05	Ehime FC	0-0	Matsumoto Yamaga FC	Ningineer Stadium	3,645
3	2017.03.12	Kamatamare Sanuki	2-2	Ehime FC	Pikara Stadium	4,037
4	2017.03.19	Ehime FC	0-1	Shonan Bellmare	Ningineer Stadium	3,493
5	2017.03.25	Mito HollyHock	1-0	Ehime FC	K's denki Stadium Mito	4,011
6	2017.04.01	Oita Trinita	1-1	Ehime FC	Oita Bank Dome	6,788
7	2017.04.09	Ehime FC	1-0	Roasso Kumamoto	Ningineer Stadium	3,766
8	2017.04.15	Kyoto Sanga FC	3-2	Ehime FC	Kyoto Nishikyogoku Athletic Stadium	5,429
9	2017.04.22	Ehime FC	1-0	V-Varen Nagasaki	Ningineer Stadium	2,280
10	2017.04.29	Ehime FC	2-0	Montedio Yamagata	Ningineer Stadium	3,455
11	2017.05.03	Yokohama FC	4-0	Ehime FC	NHK Spring Mitsuzawa Football Stadium	5,182
12	2017.05.07	Ehime FC	2-1	Renofa Yamaguchi FC	Ningineer Stadium	3,858
13	2017.05.13	Thespakusatsu Gunma	0-3	Ehime FC	Shoda Shoyu Stadium Gunma	1,402
14	2017.05.17	Ehime FC	2-0	Fagiano Okayama	Ningineer Stadium	2,539
15	2017.05.21	Ehime FC	1-2	Nagoya Grampus	Ningineer Stadium	7,863
16	2017.05.27	JEF United Chiba	4-2	Ehime FC	Fukuda Denshi Arena	7,647
17	2017.06.04	FC Machida Zelvia	1-2	Ehime FC	Machida Stadium	3,105
18	2017.06.11	Ehime FC	2-0	FC Gifu	Ningineer Stadium	2,885
19	2017.06.17	Tokyo Verdy	3-3	Ehime FC	Ajinomoto Stadium	6,057
20	2017.06.25	Ehime FC	0-1	Avispa Fukuoka	Ningineer Stadium	7,117
21	2017.07.01	Tokushima Vortis	4-1	Ehime FC	Pocarisweat Stadium	7,583
22	2017.07.09	V-Varen Nagasaki	2-0	Ehime FC	Transcosmos Stadium Nagasaki	3,189
23	2017.07.16	Ehime FC	2-2	Oita Trinita	Ningineer Stadium	4,011
24	2017.07.22	Matsumoto Yamaga FC	2-1	Ehime FC	Matsumotodaira Park Stadium	11,222
25	2017.07.29	Ehime FC	1-0	JEF United Chiba	Ningineer Stadium	3,908
26	2017.08.06	Nagoya Grampus	7-4	Ehime FC	Paloma Mizuho Stadium	11,473
27	2017.08.11	Ehime FC	0-0	Mito HollyHock	Ningineer Stadium	3,149
28	2017.08.16	Fagiano Okayama	0-1	Ehime FC	City Light Stadium	9,948
29	2017.08.20	Ehime FC	1-1	FC Machida Zelvia	Ningineer Stadium	2,189
30	2017.08.27	Ehime FC	0-3	Tokyo Verdy	Ningineer Stadium	3,173
31	2017.09.03	FC Gifu	2-1	Ehime FC	Gifu Nagaragawa Stadium	6,712
32	2017.09.09	Avispa Fukuoka	0-1	Ehime FC	Level5 Stadium	7,194
34	2017.09.24	Ehime FC	2-3	Yokohama FC	Ningineer Stadium	4,130
35	2017.10.01	Roasso Kumamoto	2-1	Ehime FC	Egao Kenko Stadium	4,005
36	2017.10.07	Zweigen Kanazawa	4-1	Ehime FC	Ishikawa Athletics Stadium	3,157
37	2017.10.15	Ehime FC	2-1	Kamatamare Sanuki	Ningineer Stadium	3,658
38	2017.10.21	Shonan Bellmare	1-0	Ehime FC	Shonan BMW Stadium Hiratsuka	5,896
39	2017.10.29	Montedio Yamagata	2-2	Ehime FC	ND Soft Stadium Yamagata	3,707
40	2017.11.05	Ehime FC	1-3	Tokushima Vortis	Ningineer Stadium	5,203
33	2017.11.08	Ehime FC	0-2	Kyoto Sanga FC	Ningineer Stadium	1,958
41	2017.11.12	Ehime FC	4-2	Thespakusatsu Gunma	Ningineer Stadium	3,198
42	2017.11.19	Renofa Yamaguchi FC	1-1	Ehime FC	Ishin Memorial Park Stadium	9,397
