= 2016 Renofa Yamaguchi FC season =

Renofa Yamaguchi FC
2016 season
- Manager: Nobuhiro Ueno
- Stadium: Ishin Memorial Park Stadium
- J2 League: 12th

2016 Renofa Yamaguchi FC season.

== J2 League ==
=== League table ===
Pos	Team	Pld	W	D	L	GF	GA	GD	Pts
11	JEF United Chiba	42	13	14	15	52	53	−1	53
12	Renofa Yamaguchi	42	14	11	17	55	63	−8	53
13	Mito HollyHock	42	10	18	14	45	49	−4	48

Updated to match(es) played on 20 November 2016. Source: 2016 MEIJI YASUDA J2 LEAGUE League table
Rules for classification: 1) Points; 2) Goal difference; 3) Goals scored

=== Match details ===
J2 League match details
Match	Date	Team	Score	Team	Venue	Attendance
1	2016.02.28	Renofa Yamaguchi FC	1-1	Fagiano Okayama	Ishin Memorial Park Stadium	11,308
2	2016.03.06	Giravanz Kitakyushu	0-1	Renofa Yamaguchi FC	Honjo Stadium	3,812
3	2016.03.13	Renofa Yamaguchi FC	0-2	FC Machida Zelvia	Ishin Memorial Park Stadium	4,711
4	2016.03.20	Yokohama FC	2-0	Renofa Yamaguchi FC	NHK Spring Mitsuzawa Football Stadium	3,122
5	2016.03.26	Matsumoto Yamaga FC	3-3	Renofa Yamaguchi FC	Matsumotodaira Park Stadium	10,895
6	2016.04.03	Renofa Yamaguchi FC	1-0	Kamatamare Sanuki	Ishin Memorial Park Stadium	5,126
7	2016.04.09	Roasso Kumamoto	1-2	Renofa Yamaguchi FC	Umakana-Yokana Stadium	6,731
8	2016.04.17	Tokushima Vortis	1-1	Renofa Yamaguchi FC	Pocarisweat Stadium	3,380
9	2016.04.23	Renofa Yamaguchi FC	4-2	JEF United Chiba	Ishin Memorial Park Stadium	5,159
10	2016.04.29	FC Gifu	1-2	Renofa Yamaguchi FC	Gifu Nagaragawa Stadium	6,058
11	2016.05.03	Renofa Yamaguchi FC	2-0	Thespakusatsu Gunma	Ishin Memorial Park Stadium	4,332
12	2016.05.07	Renofa Yamaguchi FC	0-1	Zweigen Kanazawa	Ishin Memorial Park Stadium	6,339
13	2016.05.15	Cerezo Osaka	2-4	Renofa Yamaguchi FC	Kincho Stadium	10,857
14	2016.05.22	Renofa Yamaguchi FC	0-3	V-Varen Nagasaki	Ishin Memorial Park Stadium	6,609
15	2016.05.28	Hokkaido Consadole Sapporo	3-1	Renofa Yamaguchi FC	Sapporo Dome	10,920
16	2016.06.04	Renofa Yamaguchi FC	3-1	Tokyo Verdy	Ishin Memorial Park Stadium	4,909
17	2016.06.08	Renofa Yamaguchi FC	1-1	Ehime FC	Ishin Memorial Park Stadium	3,629
18	2016.06.12	Kyoto Sanga FC	3-0	Renofa Yamaguchi FC	Kyoto Nishikyogoku Athletic Stadium	5,925
19	2016.06.19	Renofa Yamaguchi FC	1-0	Mito HollyHock	Ishin Memorial Park Stadium	4,599
20	2016.06.26	Renofa Yamaguchi FC	0-4	Shimizu S-Pulse	Ishin Memorial Park Stadium	7,310
21	2016.07.03	Montedio Yamagata	2-1	Renofa Yamaguchi FC	ND Soft Stadium Yamagata	4,597
22	2016.07.10	Renofa Yamaguchi FC	5-1	Giravanz Kitakyushu	Ishin Memorial Park Stadium	6,232
23	2016.07.16	Kamatamare Sanuki	0-2	Renofa Yamaguchi FC	Pikara Stadium	3,212
24	2016.07.20	Ehime FC	1-1	Renofa Yamaguchi FC	Ningineer Stadium	2,835
25	2016.07.24	Renofa Yamaguchi FC	1-1	Kyoto Sanga FC	Ishin Memorial Park Stadium	5,226
26	2016.07.31	Renofa Yamaguchi FC	1-2	Hokkaido Consadole Sapporo	Ishin Memorial Park Stadium	7,510
27	2016.08.07	FC Machida Zelvia	2-3	Renofa Yamaguchi FC	Machida Stadium	4,107
28	2016.08.11	Renofa Yamaguchi FC	0-2	Cerezo Osaka	Ishin Memorial Park Stadium	14,532
29	2016.08.14	Shimizu S-Pulse	2-2	Renofa Yamaguchi FC	IAI Stadium Nihondaira	12,729
30	2016.08.21	Renofa Yamaguchi FC	0-0	Matsumoto Yamaga FC	Ishin Memorial Park Stadium	6,408
31	2016.09.11	Fagiano Okayama	1-0	Renofa Yamaguchi FC	City Light Stadium	11,225
32	2016.09.18	JEF United Chiba	1-1	Renofa Yamaguchi FC	Fukuda Denshi Arena	10,036
33	2016.09.25	Renofa Yamaguchi FC	2-3	FC Gifu	Ishin Memorial Park Stadium	5,026
34	2016.10.02	Renofa Yamaguchi FC	0-2	Roasso Kumamoto	Shimonoseki Stadium	7,609
35	2016.10.08	Zweigen Kanazawa	1-0	Renofa Yamaguchi FC	Ishikawa Athletics Stadium	2,333
36	2016.10.16	Renofa Yamaguchi FC	2-1	Tokushima Vortis	Ishin Memorial Park Stadium	4,008
37	2016.10.23	V-Varen Nagasaki	2-1	Renofa Yamaguchi FC	Transcosmos Stadium Nagasaki	4,536
38	2016.10.30	Renofa Yamaguchi FC	0-2	Yokohama FC	Ishin Memorial Park Stadium	13,311
39	2016.11.03	Tokyo Verdy	2-2	Renofa Yamaguchi FC	Ajinomoto Stadium	4,054
40	2016.11.06	Thespakusatsu Gunma	2-0	Renofa Yamaguchi FC	Shoda Shoyu Stadium Gunma	2,850
41	2016.11.12	Renofa Yamaguchi FC	2-2	Montedio Yamagata	Ishin Memorial Park Stadium	5,839
42	2016.11.20	Mito HollyHock	0-2	Renofa Yamaguchi FC	K's denki Stadium Mito	7,274
