= Masato Kojima =

Japanese footballer (born 1996)

Masato Kojima 小島 幹敏
Personal information
- Full name: Masato Kojima
- Date of birth: 17 September 1996 (age 30)
- Place of birth: Saitama, Japan
- Height: 1.77 m (5 ft 9 1/2 in)
- Position: Midfielder

Team information
- Current team: RB Omiya Ardija
- Number: 7

Youth career
- 2006: Omiya Onari SSS
- 2007–2014: Omiya Ardija

Senior career*
Years	Team	Apps	(Gls)
2015–	Omiya Ardija / RB Omiya Ardija	263	(13)
2015	→ J. League U-22 (loan)	1	(0)
2017–2018	→ Mito HollyHock (loan)	55	(4)
- * Club domestic league appearances and goals as of 21:03, 10 June 2026 (UTC)

Masato Kojima (小島 幹敏, Kojima Masato; born 17 September 1996) is a Japanese professional footballer who plays as a midfielder for J2 League club RB Omiya Ardija.

== Playing career ==
Masato Kojima joined Omiya Ardija in 2015.

== Career statistics ==
As of match played 6 June 2026

Appearances and goals by club, season and competition
Club	Season	League			Emperor's Cup		J.League Cup		Other		Total	
Club	Season	Division	Apps	Goals	Apps	Goals	Apps	Goals	Apps	Goals	Apps	Goals
RB Omiya Ardija	2016	J1 League	0	0	1	0	2	0	—		3	0
RB Omiya Ardija	2019	J2 League	28	1	1	0	—		—		29	1
RB Omiya Ardija	2020	J2 League	34	3	—		—		—		34	3
RB Omiya Ardija	2021	J2 League	38	1	1	0	—		—		39	1
RB Omiya Ardija	2022	J2 League	33	1	0	0	—		—		33	1
RB Omiya Ardija	2023	J2 League	38	0	2	0	—		—		40	0
RB Omiya Ardija	2024	J3 League	38	3	1	1	0	0	—		39	4
RB Omiya Ardija	2025	J2 League	37	2	1	0	1	0	1 (Note: Appearance in J2 League promotion play-offs)	0	40	2
RB Omiya Ardija	2026	J2/J3	17	2	—		—		—		17	2
RB Omiya Ardija	Total		263	13	7	1	3	0	1	0	274	14
J. League U-22 (loan)	2015	J3 League	1	0	—		—		—		1	0
Mito HollyHock (loan)	2017	J2 League	16	0	0	0	—		—		16	0
Mito HollyHock (loan)	2018	J2 League	39	4	0	0	—		—		39	4
Mito HollyHock (loan)	Total		55	4	0	0	—		—		55	4
Career total			319	17	7	1	3	0	1	0	330	18

== Honours ==
RB Omiya Ardija

- J3 League: 2024

Individual

- J3 League Monthly MVP: September 2024
- J3 League Best XI: 2024
