= Kiyohiro Hirabayashi =

Japanese footballer

Kiyohiro Hirabayashi 平林 輝良寛
Personal information
- Full name: Kiyohiro Hirabayashi
- Date of birth: June 4, 1984 (age 42)
- Place of birth: Inazawa, Aichi, Japan
- Height: 1.74 m (5 ft 8 1/2 in)
- Position: Midfielder

Youth career
- 2000–2002: Nagoya Grampus Eight

Senior career*
Years	Team	Apps	(Gls)
2003–2006	Nagoya Grampus Eight	14	(1)
2006	Sagan Tosu	2	(0)
2007–2008	FC Kariya	61	(19)
2011–2012	Zweigen Kanazawa	57	(15)
2013–2016	Renofa Yamaguchi	78	(16)
Total		212	(51)

International career
2001	Japan U-17	2	(0)
- * Club domestic league appearances and goals

Kiyohiro Hirabayashi (平林 輝良寛, Hirabayashi Kiyohiro; born June 4, 1984) is a former Japanese football player. He is also a former futsal player.

== Club career ==
Hirabayashi was born in Inazawa on June 4, 1984. He joined Nagoya Grampus Eight from youth team in 2003. However he could hardly play in the match and he moved to Sagan Tosu in September 2006. In 2007, he moved to Japan Football League (JFL) club FC Kariya. He became a regular player and played many matches. He left the club end of 2008 season.

He played futsal from 2009 to 2011 while he could not find a transfer destination club. He played for his local club Nagoya Oceans in F.League. He played in 2 seasons and the club won the champions both seasons.

In April 2011, he signed with JFL club Zweigen Kanazawa and came back as football player. He moved to Regional Leagues club Renofa Yamaguchi FC in 2013. The club was promoted to JFL, J3 League and J2 League every season until 2016. He retired end of 2016 season.

== National team career ==
In September 2001, Hirabayashi was selected Japan U-17 national team for 2001 U-17 World Championship. He played 2 matches.

== Career statistics ==
Appearances and goals by club, season and competition
Club	Season	League			Emperor's Cup		J.League Cup		Total	
Club	Season	Division	Apps	Goals	Apps	Goals	Apps	Goals	Apps	Goals
Nagoya Grampus Eight	2003	J1 League	0	0	0	0	0	0	0	0
Nagoya Grampus Eight	2004	J1 League	8	0	1	0	1	0	10	0
Nagoya Grampus Eight	2005	J1 League	5	1	0	0	4	0	9	1
Nagoya Grampus Eight	2006	J1 League	1	0	0	0	2	0	3	0
Sagan Tosu	2006	J2 League	2	0	0	0	—		2	0
FC Kariya	2007	Football League	30	7	1	0	—		31	7
FC Kariya	2008	Football League	31	12	—		—		31	12
Zweigen Kanazawa	2011	Football League	31	10	2	4	—		33	14
Zweigen Kanazawa	2012	Football League	26	5	1	0	—		27	5
Renofa Yamaguchi FC	2013	Regional Leagues	16	7	1	0	—		17	7
Renofa Yamaguchi FC	2014	Football League	26	5	—		—		26	5
Renofa Yamaguchi FC	2015	J3 League	30	4	1	0	—		31	4
Renofa Yamaguchi FC	2016	J2 League	6	0	0	0	—		6	0
Career total			212	51	7	4	7	0	236	55
