= 2014 Ehime FC season =

Ehime FC
2014 season
- Manager: Kiyotaka Ishimaru
- Stadium: Ningineer Stadium
- J2 League: 19th

2014 Ehime FC season.

== J2 League ==
Match	Date	Team	Score	Team	Venue	Attendance
1	2014.03.02	Yokohama FC	0-0	Ehime FC	NHK Spring Mitsuzawa Football Stadium	3,684
2	2014.03.09	Ehime FC	0-2	Mito HollyHock	Ningineer Stadium	4,327
3	2014.03.16	Avispa Fukuoka	1-1	Ehime FC	Level5 Stadium	3,742
4	2014.03.22	Ehime FC	2-1	Tokyo Verdy	Ningineer Stadium	2,554
5	2014.03.30	Ehime FC	0-0	FC Gifu	Ningineer Stadium	3,532
6	2014.04.05	Montedio Yamagata	2-0	Ehime FC	ND Soft Stadium Yamagata	4,371
7	2014.04.13	Ehime FC	4-0	Kataller Toyama	Ningineer Stadium	2,272
8	2014.04.20	V-Varen Nagasaki	2-1	Ehime FC	Nagasaki Stadium	3,340
9	2014.04.26	Kyoto Sanga FC	0-0	Ehime FC	Kyoto Nishikyogoku Athletic Stadium	6,163
10	2014.04.29	Ehime FC	0-1	Tochigi SC	Ningineer Stadium	2,935
11	2014.05.03	Matsumoto Yamaga FC	2-1	Ehime FC	Matsumotodaira Park Stadium	13,732
12	2014.05.06	Ehime FC	0-1	Júbilo Iwata	Ningineer Stadium	8,295
13	2014.05.12	Consadole Sapporo	0-1	Ehime FC	Sapporo Dome	6,646
14	2014.05.18	Ehime FC	2-0	Kamatamare Sanuki	Ningineer Stadium	7,166
15	2014.05.24	Ehime FC	1-0	Shonan Bellmare	Ningineer Stadium	2,851
16	2014.05.31	JEF United Chiba	1-0	Ehime FC	Fukuda Denshi Arena	8,083
17	2014.06.07	Ehime FC	0-2	Thespakusatsu Gunma	Ningineer Stadium	2,057
18	2014.06.14	Ehime FC	2-3	Fagiano Okayama	Ningineer Stadium	4,750
19	2014.06.21	Oita Trinita	2-2	Ehime FC	Oita Bank Dome	10,102
20	2014.06.28	Ehime FC	4-0	Roasso Kumamoto	Ningineer Stadium	2,821
21	2014.07.05	Giravanz Kitakyushu	0-3	Ehime FC	Honjo Stadium	3,027
22	2014.07.20	Ehime FC	0-0	Kyoto Sanga FC	Ningineer Stadium	3,865
23	2014.07.26	Ehime FC	2-3	Consadole Sapporo	Ningineer Stadium	5,017
24	2014.07.30	Kataller Toyama	1-3	Ehime FC	Toyama Stadium	3,756
25	2014.08.03	Ehime FC	0-0	Avispa Fukuoka	Ningineer Stadium	2,819
26	2014.08.10	FC Gifu	4-3	Ehime FC	Gifu Nagaragawa Stadium	3,162
27	2014.08.17	Ehime FC	1-4	Matsumoto Yamaga FC	Ningineer Stadium	3,211
28	2014.08.24	Mito HollyHock	0-0	Ehime FC	K's denki Stadium Mito	5,242
29	2014.08.31	Ehime FC	1-2	Oita Trinita	Ningineer Stadium	2,730
30	2014.09.06	Tochigi SC	3-3	Ehime FC	Tochigi Green Stadium	4,319
31	2014.09.14	Ehime FC	4-0	Montedio Yamagata	Ningineer Stadium	4,209
32	2014.09.20	Fagiano Okayama	1-1	Ehime FC	Kanko Stadium	8,599
33	2014.09.23	Ehime FC	2-2	JEF United Chiba	Ningineer Stadium	3,107
34	2014.09.28	Júbilo Iwata	2-0	Ehime FC	Yamaha Stadium	8,671
35	2014.10.04	Shonan Bellmare	3-0	Ehime FC	Shonan BMW Stadium Hiratsuka	8,156
36	2014.10.11	Ehime FC	2-1	Yokohama FC	Ningineer Stadium	3,258
37	2014.10.19	Kamatamare Sanuki	1-2	Ehime FC	Kagawa Marugame Stadium	4,265
38	2014.10.26	Tokyo Verdy	1-1	Ehime FC	Ajinomoto Stadium	3,984
39	2014.11.01	Ehime FC	0-3	V-Varen Nagasaki	Ningineer Stadium	4,869
40	2014.11.09	Roasso Kumamoto	3-1	Ehime FC	Kumamoto Suizenji Stadium	6,924
41	2014.11.15	Ehime FC	2-1	Giravanz Kitakyushu	Ningineer Stadium	3,583
42	2014.11.23	Thespakusatsu Gunma	3-2	Ehime FC	Shoda Shoyu Stadium Gunma	5,180
