= 2018 Omiya Ardija season =

Omiya Ardija
2018 season
- Manager: Masatada Ishii
- Stadium: NACK5 Stadium Omiya
- J2 League: 5th

2018 Omiya Ardija season.

== J2 League ==
=== League table ===
| Pos | Team | Pld | W | D | L | GF | GA | GD | Pts | Promotion, qualification or relegation |
|---|---|---|---|---|---|---|---|---|---|---|
| 3 | Yokohama FC | 42 | 21 | 13 | 8 | 63 | 44 | +19 | 76 | Qualification for promotion play-offs (Note: Only teams that meet J1 license criteria can participate in promotion play-offs. If one or more teams fail to meet the criteria, only eligible teams that finished 3rd to 6th will participate and no replacement teams will be added.) |
| 4 | Machida Zelvia | 42 | 21 | 13 | 8 | 62 | 44 | +18 | 76 | Ineligible for promotion play-offs |
| 5 | Omiya Ardija | 42 | 21 | 8 | 13 | 65 | 48 | +17 | 71 | Qualification for promotion play-offs |
| 6 | Tokyo Verdy | 42 | 19 | 14 | 9 | 56 | 41 | +15 | 71 | Qualification for promotion play-offs |
| 7 | Avispa Fukuoka | 42 | 19 | 13 | 10 | 58 | 42 | +16 | 70 | |

Source: 2018 MEIJI YASUDA J2 LEAGUE League table
Rules for classification: 1) Points; 2) Goal difference; 3) Goals scored

=== Match details ===
| Match | Date | Team | Score | Team | Venue | Attendance |
|---|---|---|---|---|---|---|
| 1 | 2018.02.25 | Omiya Ardija | 2-1 | Ventforet Kofu | NACK5 Stadium Omiya | 11,777 |
| 2 | 2018.03.04 | FC Machida Zelvia | 3-2 | Omiya Ardija | Machida Stadium | 8,839 |
| 3 | 2018.03.10 | Omiya Ardija | 0-1 | Tokushima Vortis | NACK5 Stadium Omiya | 6,989 |
| 4 | 2018.03.17 | Omiya Ardija | 1-1 | Zweigen Kanazawa | NACK5 Stadium Omiya | 7,298 |
| 5 | 2018.03.21 | Roasso Kumamoto | 2-1 | Omiya Ardija | Egao Kenko Stadium | 4,126 |
| 6 | 2018.03.25 | Omiya Ardija | 2-1 | Avispa Fukuoka | NACK5 Stadium Omiya | 9,106 |
| 7 | 2018.04.01 | Matsumoto Yamaga FC | 3-2 | Omiya Ardija | Matsumotodaira Park Stadium | 15,871 |
| 8 | 2018.04.07 | Renofa Yamaguchi FC | 2-1 | Omiya Ardija | Ishin Me-Life Stadium | 5,353 |
| 9 | 2018.04.14 | Omiya Ardija | 1-1 | Fagiano Okayama | NACK5 Stadium Omiya | 7,248 |
| 10 | 2018.04.22 | Albirex Niigata | 0-1 | Omiya Ardija | Denka Big Swan Stadium | 15,323 |
| 11 | 2018.04.28 | Omiya Ardija | 2-0 | Tokyo Verdy | NACK5 Stadium Omiya | 9,927 |
| 12 | 2018.05.03 | Oita Trinita | 1-2 | Omiya Ardija | Oita Bank Dome | 10,134 |
| 13 | 2018.05.06 | Omiya Ardija | 0-1 | JEF United Chiba | NACK5 Stadium Omiya | 12,400 |
| 14 | 2018.05.13 | Montedio Yamagata | 1-1 | Omiya Ardija | ND Soft Stadium Yamagata | 8,801 |
| 15 | 2018.05.19 | Omiya Ardija | 0-2 | FC Gifu | NACK5 Stadium Omiya | 7,133 |
| 16 | 2018.05.27 | Tochigi SC | 0-1 | Omiya Ardija | Tochigi Green Stadium | 8,354 |
| 17 | 2018.06.02 | Omiya Ardija | 2-2 | Kamatamare Sanuki | NACK5 Stadium Omiya | 8,085 |
| 18 | 2018.06.10 | Omiya Ardija | 4-0 | Yokohama FC | NACK5 Stadium Omiya | 6,506 |
| 19 | 2018.06.16 | Mito HollyHock | 1-2 | Omiya Ardija | K's denki Stadium Mito | 5,468 |
| 20 | 2018.06.23 | Kyoto Sanga FC | 0-3 | Omiya Ardija | Kyoto Nishikyogoku Athletic Stadium | 4,218 |
| 21 | 2018.06.30 | Omiya Ardija | 1-1 | Ehime FC | NACK5 Stadium Omiya | 9,886 |
| 22 | 2018.07.07 | JEF United Chiba | 1-3 | Omiya Ardija | Fukuda Denshi Arena | 11,069 |
| 23 | 2018.07.15 | Omiya Ardija | 1-0 | Oita Trinita | NACK5 Stadium Omiya | 9,272 |
| 24 | 2018.07.21 | Tokushima Vortis | 2-1 | Omiya Ardija | Pocarisweat Stadium | 5,801 |
| 25 | 2018.07.25 | Omiya Ardija | 1-2 | Matsumoto Yamaga FC | NACK5 Stadium Omiya | 9,329 |
| 26 | 2018.07.29 | Omiya Ardija | 2-1 | Roasso Kumamoto | NACK5 Stadium Omiya | 7,278 |
| 27 | 2018.08.04 | Tokyo Verdy | 2-1 | Omiya Ardija | Ajinomoto Stadium | 5,350 |
| 28 | 2018.08.12 | Ehime FC | 1-5 | Omiya Ardija | Ningineer Stadium | 3,597 |
| 29 | 2018.08.18 | Omiya Ardija | 2-1 | Albirex Niigata | NACK5 Stadium Omiya | 11,260 |
| 30 | 2018.08.26 | Omiya Ardija | 4-4 | Renofa Yamaguchi FC | NACK5 Stadium Omiya | 9,232 |
| 31 | 2018.09.01 | FC Gifu | 0-1 | Omiya Ardija | Gifu Nagaragawa Stadium | 5,247 |
| 33 | 2018.09.15 | Omiya Ardija | 1-0 | FC Machida Zelvia | Kumagaya Athletic Stadium | 9,628 |
| 32 | 2018.09.19 | Ventforet Kofu | 1-0 | Omiya Ardija | Yamanashi Chuo Bank Stadium | 5,631 |
| 34 | 2018.09.23 | Kamatamare Sanuki | 0-2 | Omiya Ardija | Pikara Stadium | 2,630 |
| 35 | 2018.09.29 | Avispa Fukuoka | 3-1 | Omiya Ardija | Level5 Stadium | 7,388 |
| 36 | 2018.10.06 | Omiya Ardija | 2-1 | Mito HollyHock | NACK5 Stadium Omiya | 7,537 |
| 37 | 2018.10.13 | Omiya Ardija | 1-0 | Tochigi SC | NACK5 Stadium Omiya | 12,053 |
| 38 | 2018.10.21 | Yokohama FC | 1-1 | Omiya Ardija | NHK Spring Mitsuzawa Football Stadium | 9,680 |
| 39 | 2018.10.28 | Omiya Ardija | 1-2 | Kyoto Sanga FC | NACK5 Stadium Omiya | 9,527 |
| 40 | 2018.11.04 | Zweigen Kanazawa | 1-1 | Omiya Ardija | Ishikawa Athletics Stadium | 5,807 |
| 41 | 2018.11.10 | Omiya Ardija | 2-1 | Montedio Yamagata | NACK5 Stadium Omiya | 12,240 |
| 42 | 2018.11.17 | Fagiano Okayama | 0-1 | Omiya Ardija | City Light Stadium | 8,861 |
