= 2017 Mito HollyHock season =

Mito HollyHock
2017 season
- Manager: Takayuki Nishigaya
- Stadium: K's denki Stadium Mito
- J2 League: 14th
Home colours	Away colours

2017 Mito HollyHock season.

== J2 League ==
=== League table ===
Pos	Team	Pld	W	D	L	GF	GA	GD	Pts
7	Tokushima Vortis	42	18	13	11	71	45	+26	67
8	Matsumoto Yamaga	42	19	9	14	61	45	+16	66
9	Oita Trinita	42	17	13	12	58	50	+8	64

Updated to match(es) played on 28 November 2017. Source: 2017 MEIJI YASUDA J2 LEAGUE League table
Rules for classification: 1) Points; 2) Goal difference; 3) Goals scored

=== Match details ===
J2 League match details
Match	Date	Team	Score	Team	Venue	Attendance
1	2017.02.26	Mito HollyHock	0-1	Shonan Bellmare	K's denki Stadium Mito	8,636
2	2017.03.04	Mito HollyHock	4-0	Zweigen Kanazawa	K's denki Stadium Mito	4,040
3	2017.03.11	Tokyo Verdy	4-0	Mito HollyHock	Ajinomoto Stadium	3,296
4	2017.03.18	Nagoya Grampus	2-1	Mito HollyHock	Paloma Mizuho Stadium	9,320
5	2017.03.25	Mito HollyHock	1-0	Ehime FC	K's denki Stadium Mito	4,011
6	2017.04.01	Mito HollyHock	1-1	Renofa Yamaguchi FC	K's denki Stadium Mito	3,072
7	2017.04.08	FC Gifu	2-1	Mito HollyHock	Gifu Nagaragawa Stadium	4,536
8	2017.04.15	Thespakusatsu Gunma	0-1	Mito HollyHock	Shoda Shoyu Stadium Gunma	5,802
9	2017.04.22	Mito HollyHock	1-1	Avispa Fukuoka	K's denki Stadium Mito	3,023
10	2017.04.29	Mito HollyHock	3-2	FC Machida Zelvia	K's denki Stadium Mito	4,119
11	2017.05.03	Montedio Yamagata	0-0	Mito HollyHock	ND Soft Stadium Yamagata	7,553
12	2017.05.07	V-Varen Nagasaki	0-0	Mito HollyHock	Transcosmos Stadium Nagasaki	4,428
13	2017.05.13	Mito HollyHock	0-0	Yokohama FC	K's denki Stadium Mito	3,028
14	2017.05.17	Kyoto Sanga FC	1-1	Mito HollyHock	Kyoto Nishikyogoku Athletic Stadium	4,918
15	2017.05.21	Mito HollyHock	1-1	Tokushima Vortis	K's denki Stadium Mito	4,307
16	2017.05.28	Roasso Kumamoto	2-3	Mito HollyHock	Egao Kenko Stadium	5,300
17	2017.06.03	Mito HollyHock	2-0	Oita Trinita	K's denki Stadium Mito	3,778
18	2017.06.11	Matsumoto Yamaga FC	0-1	Mito HollyHock	Matsumotodaira Park Stadium	11,004
19	2017.06.17	Mito HollyHock	3-1	JEF United Chiba	K's denki Stadium Mito	5,666
20	2017.06.25	Mito HollyHock	2-1	Kamatamare Sanuki	K's denki Stadium Mito	3,242
21	2017.07.01	Fagiano Okayama	3-0	Mito HollyHock	City Light Stadium	8,084
22	2017.07.08	Mito HollyHock	2-2	Roasso Kumamoto	K's denki Stadium Mito	4,306
23	2017.07.16	FC Machida Zelvia	2-0	Mito HollyHock	Machida Stadium	5,022
24	2017.07.22	Oita Trinita	0-0	Mito HollyHock	Oita Bank Dome	7,443
25	2017.07.29	Mito HollyHock	3-2	Tokyo Verdy	K's denki Stadium Mito	4,515
26	2017.08.05	Kamatamare Sanuki	2-0	Mito HollyHock	Pikara Stadium	2,000
27	2017.08.11	Ehime FC	0-0	Mito HollyHock	Ningineer Stadium	3,149
28	2017.08.16	Mito HollyHock	2-0	Kyoto Sanga FC	K's denki Stadium Mito	5,540
29	2017.08.20	Yokohama FC	1-0	Mito HollyHock	NHK Spring Mitsuzawa Football Stadium	3,483
30	2017.08.27	Avispa Fukuoka	0-0	Mito HollyHock	Level5 Stadium	8,075
31	2017.09.02	Mito HollyHock	1-1	Nagoya Grampus	K's denki Stadium Mito	9,240
32	2017.09.09	Mito HollyHock	1-2	FC Gifu	K's denki Stadium Mito	4,595
33	2017.09.16	JEF United Chiba	2-1	Mito HollyHock	Fukuda Denshi Arena	7,334
34	2017.09.24	Mito HollyHock	4-0	Thespakusatsu Gunma	K's denki Stadium Mito	4,887
35	2017.09.30	Mito HollyHock	0-1	Matsumoto Yamaga FC	K's denki Stadium Mito	7,602
36	2017.10.07	Shonan Bellmare	3-0	Mito HollyHock	Shonan BMW Stadium Hiratsuka	6,629
37	2017.10.14	Mito HollyHock	1-0	Fagiano Okayama	K's denki Stadium Mito	3,502
38	2017.10.21	Renofa Yamaguchi FC	1-0	Mito HollyHock	Shimonoseki Stadium	3,538
39	2017.10.28	Tokushima Vortis	2-3	Mito HollyHock	Pocarisweat Stadium	3,915
40	2017.11.05	Mito HollyHock	0-2	V-Varen Nagasaki	K's denki Stadium Mito	4,867
41	2017.11.12	Mito HollyHock	0-1	Montedio Yamagata	K's denki Stadium Mito	7,573
42	2017.11.19	Zweigen Kanazawa	2-1	Mito HollyHock	Ishikawa Athletics Stadium	3,134
