= 2015 Ehime FC season =

Ehime FC
2015 season
- Manager: Takashi Kiyama
- Stadium: Ningineer Stadium
- J2 League: 5th

2015 Ehime FC season.

== J2 League ==
=== League table ===
Pos	Team	Pld	W	D	L	GF	GA	GD	Pts	Promotion, qualification or relegation
4	Cerezo Osaka	42	18	13	11	57	40	+17	67	Qualification for promotion playoffs (Note: Only teams that meet J1 license criteria can participate in promotion playoffs. If one or more teams fail to meet the criteria, only eligible teams that finished 3rd to 6th will participate and no replacement teams will be added.)
5	Ehime FC	42	19	8	15	47	39	+8	65	Qualification for promotion playoffs
6	V-Varen Nagasaki	42	15	15	12	42	33	+9	60	Qualification for promotion playoffs

Source: Meiji Yasuda J2 League Standing
Rules for classification: 1) Points; 2) Goal difference; 3) Goals scored

=== Match details ===
J2 League match details
Match	Date	Team	Score	Team	Venue	Attendance
1	2015.03.08	Tokushima Vortis	0-0	Ehime FC	Pocarisweat Stadium	7,860
2	2015.03.15	Ehime FC	2-1	Avispa Fukuoka	Ningineer Stadium	2,489
3	2015.03.21	Ehime FC	0-1	Roasso Kumamoto	Ningineer Stadium	2,278
4	2015.03.29	Mito HollyHock	3-1	Ehime FC	Kasamatsu Stadium	4,730
5	2015.04.01	Zweigen Kanazawa	3-1	Ehime FC	Ishikawa Athletics Stadium	1,227
6	2015.04.05	Ehime FC	2-0	Oita Trinita	Ningineer Stadium	2,211
7	2015.04.11	Thespakusatsu Gunma	0-1	Ehime FC	Shoda Shoyu Stadium Gunma	3,228
8	2015.04.19	Ehime FC	1-0	JEF United Chiba	Ningineer Stadium	3,109
9	2015.04.26	Tochigi SC	0-1	Ehime FC	Tochigi Green Stadium	3,832
10	2015.04.29	Ehime FC	2-3	Giravanz Kitakyushu	Ningineer Stadium	2,602
11	2015.05.03	Omiya Ardija	1-0	Ehime FC	NACK5 Stadium Omiya	8,374
12	2015.05.06	Ehime FC	0-0	Consadole Sapporo	Ningineer Stadium	3,124
13	2015.05.10	FC Gifu	2-1	Ehime FC	Gifu Nagaragawa Stadium	3,539
14	2015.05.17	Ehime FC	3-2	Kyoto Sanga FC	Ningineer Stadium	3,291
15	2015.05.24	V-Varen Nagasaki	3-1	Ehime FC	Nagasaki Stadium	3,105
16	2015.05.31	Ehime FC	3-0	Yokohama FC	Ningineer Stadium	3,419
17	2015.06.06	Cerezo Osaka	1-0	Ehime FC	Yanmar Stadium Nagai	16,116
18	2015.06.14	Ehime FC	2-1	Tokyo Verdy	Ningineer Stadium	2,371
19	2015.06.21	Fagiano Okayama	1-2	Ehime FC	City Light Stadium	7,531
20	2015.06.28	Ehime FC	0-2	Júbilo Iwata	Ningineer Stadium	4,508
21	2015.07.04	Kamatamare Sanuki	0-0	Ehime FC	Kagawa Marugame Stadium	3,129
22	2015.07.08	Ehime FC	0-0	Tochigi SC	Ningineer Stadium	1,722
23	2015.07.12	Roasso Kumamoto	2-0	Ehime FC	Umakana-Yokana Stadium	3,978
24	2015.07.18	Ehime FC	0-2	Mito HollyHock	Ningineer Stadium	3,197
25	2015.07.22	Ehime FC	1-1	Zweigen Kanazawa	Ningineer Stadium	1,894
26	2015.07.26	Consadole Sapporo	0-1	Ehime FC	Sapporo Dome	17,767
27	2015.08.01	Ehime FC	2-1	Cerezo Osaka	Ningineer Stadium	7,177
28	2015.08.08	Oita Trinita	0-1	Ehime FC	Oita Bank Dome	7,086
29	2015.08.15	Ehime FC	3-1	Omiya Ardija	Ningineer Stadium	3,733
30	2015.08.23	Tokyo Verdy	0-1	Ehime FC	Ajinomoto Stadium	6,843
31	2015.09.13	Ehime FC	1-1	Fagiano Okayama	Ningineer Stadium	6,862
32	2015.09.20	Júbilo Iwata	0-0	Ehime FC	Yamaha Stadium	12,058
33	2015.09.23	Ehime FC	1-0	Kamatamare Sanuki	Ningineer Stadium	4,769
34	2015.09.27	Yokohama FC	2-1	Ehime FC	NHK Spring Mitsuzawa Football Stadium	4,510
35	2015.10.04	JEF United Chiba	1-0	Ehime FC	Fukuda Denshi Arena	9,904
36	2015.10.10	Ehime FC	0-0	V-Varen Nagasaki	Ningineer Stadium	3,337
37	2015.10.18	Giravanz Kitakyushu	3-2	Ehime FC	Honjo Stadium	2,719
38	2015.10.25	Ehime FC	3-0	Thespakusatsu Gunma	Ningineer Stadium	2,808
39	2015.11.01	Ehime FC	3-0	FC Gifu	Ningineer Stadium	5,134
40	2015.11.08	Kyoto Sanga FC	0-1	Ehime FC	Kyoto Nishikyogoku Athletic Stadium	3,681
41	2015.11.14	Avispa Fukuoka	1-0	Ehime FC	Level5 Stadium	15,750
42	2015.11.23	Ehime FC	3-0	Tokushima Vortis	Ningineer Stadium	9,158
