= 2015 J.League U-22 Selection season =

J.League U-22 Selection
2015 season
- Manager: Tsutomu Takahata
- J3 League: 12th

2015 J.League U-22 Selection season.

== J3 League ==
=== League table ===
Pos	Team	Pld	W	D	L	GF	GA	GD	Pts	Promotion or relegation
8	Blaublitz Akita	36	12	9	15	37	40	−3	45	
9	FC Ryukyu	36	12	9	15	45	51	−6	45	
10	Fujieda MYFC	36	11	4	21	37	61	−24	37	
11	Grulla Morioka	36	8	11	17	36	47	−11	35	
12	J.League U-22 Selection (W)	36	7	7	22	28	71	−43	28	Folded by JFA after the season.
13	YSCC Yokohama	36	7	6	23	24	58	−34	27	

Updated to match(es) played on 23 November 2015. Source: JLeague.jp
Rules for classification: 1) Points; 2) Goal difference; 3) Goals scored; 4th) head-to-head results; 5th) disciplinary points; 6th) draw
(W) Withdrawn

=== Match details ===
J3 League match details
Match	Date	Team	Score	Team	Venue	Attendance
1	2015.03.15	SC Sagamihara	3-0	J.League U-22 Selection	Sagamihara Gion Stadium	3,061
2	2015.03.21	Renofa Yamaguchi FC	8-0	J.League U-22 Selection	Ishin Memorial Park Stadium	3,348
3	2015.03.29	FC Ryukyu	2-1	J.League U-22 Selection	Okinawa Athletic Park Stadium	1,453
4	2015.04.05	Gainare Tottori	2-0	J.League U-22 Selection	Tottori Bank Bird Stadium	1,191
5	2015.04.12	Grulla Morioka	1-2	J.League U-22 Selection	Morioka Minami Park Stadium	1,417
6	2015.04.19	Fujieda MYFC	1-1	J.League U-22 Selection	Fujieda Soccer Stadium	723
7	2015.04.26	FC Machida Zelvia	6-0	J.League U-22 Selection	Machida Stadium	3,511
8	2015.04.29	YSCC Yokohama	0-0	J.League U-22 Selection	NHK Spring Mitsuzawa Football Stadium	1,162
10	2015.05.06	AC Nagano Parceiro	2-0	J.League U-22 Selection	Minami Nagano Sports Park Stadium	3,932
11	2015.05.10	Kataller Toyama	2-1	J.League U-22 Selection	Kataller Toyama	3,102
12	2015.05.17	Fukushima United FC	1-4	J.League U-22 Selection	Toho Stadium	820
13	2015.05.24	Blaublitz Akita	1-0	J.League U-22 Selection	Akigin Stadium	1,771
14	2015.05.31	Renofa Yamaguchi FC	3-0	J.League U-22 Selection	Shimonoseki Stadium	2,153
15	2015.06.07	Gainare Tottori	1-1	J.League U-22 Selection	Tottori Bank Bird Stadium	1,096
16	2015.06.14	FC Ryukyu	2-1	J.League U-22 Selection	Okinawa Athletic Park Stadium	701
17	2015.06.21	Kataller Toyama	0-0	J.League U-22 Selection	Kataller Toyama	2,375
18	2015.06.28	Fukushima United FC	1-1	J.League U-22 Selection	Toho Stadium	692
19	2015.07.05	Grulla Morioka	5-0	J.League U-22 Selection	Morioka Minami Park Stadium	1,053
20	2015.07.12	SC Sagamihara	1-2	J.League U-22 Selection	Sagamihara Gion Stadium	2,821
21	2015.07.19	FC Machida Zelvia	3-1	J.League U-22 Selection	Machida Stadium	2,848
22	2015.07.26	Fujieda MYFC	2-0	J.League U-22 Selection	Fujieda Soccer Stadium	1,144
24	2015.08.02	Blaublitz Akita	0-0	J.League U-22 Selection	Akigin Stadium	1,901
25	2015.08.09	YSCC Yokohama	0-3	J.League U-22 Selection	NHK Spring Mitsuzawa Football Stadium	1,079
26	2015.08.16	AC Nagano Parceiro	0-1	J.League U-22 Selection	Minami Nagano Sports Park Stadium	4,654
27	2015.09.06	FC Ryukyu	6-0	J.League U-22 Selection	Okinawa Athletic Park Stadium	673
28	2015.09.13	YSCC Yokohama	4-0	J.League U-22 Selection	NHK Spring Mitsuzawa Football Stadium	678
29	2015.09.20	SC Sagamihara	3-2	J.League U-22 Selection	Sagamihara Gion Stadium	2,062
30	2015.09.23	FC Machida Zelvia	1-0	J.League U-22 Selection	Machida Stadium	5,873
31	2015.09.27	Blaublitz Akita	1-0	J.League U-22 Selection	Akigin Stadium	1,692
32	2015.10.04	Grulla Morioka	1-0	J.League U-22 Selection	Morioka Minami Park Stadium	944
33	2015.10.11	Gainare Tottori	0-1	J.League U-22 Selection	Tottori Bank Bird Stadium	1,349
34	2015.10.18	Kataller Toyama	2-1	J.League U-22 Selection	Kataller Toyama	2,270
35	2015.10.25	Fujieda MYFC	1-4	J.League U-22 Selection	Shizuoka Stadium	858
36	2015.11.01	AC Nagano Parceiro	2-1	J.League U-22 Selection	Minami Nagano Sports Park Stadium	4,163
37	2015.11.08	Fukushima United FC	3-0	J.League U-22 Selection	Toho Stadium	791
38	2015.11.14	Renofa Yamaguchi FC	0-0	J.League U-22 Selection	Ishin Memorial Park Stadium	6,322
