= 2016 Mito HollyHock season =

Mito HollyHock
2016 season
- Manager: Takayuki Nishigaya
- Stadium: K's denki Stadium Mito
- J2 League: 13th
Home colours	Away colours

2016 Mito HollyHock season.

== J2 League ==
=== League table ===
Pos	Team	Pld	W	D	L	GF	GA	GD	Pts
12	Renofa Yamaguchi	42	14	11	17	55	63	−8	53
13	Mito HollyHock	42	10	18	14	45	49	−4	48
14	Montedio Yamagata	42	11	14	17	43	49	−6	47

Updated to match(es) played on 20 November 2016. Source: 2016 MEIJI YASUDA J2 LEAGUE League table
Rules for classification: 1) Points; 2) Goal difference; 3) Goals scored

=== Match details ===
J2 League match details
Match	Date	Team	Score	Team	Venue	Attendance
1	2016.02.28	Kyoto Sanga FC	1-1	Mito HollyHock	Kyoto Nishikyogoku Athletic Stadium	6,983
2	2016.03.06	Mito HollyHock	0-1	Cerezo Osaka	K's denki Stadium Mito	10,420
3	2016.03.13	Zweigen Kanazawa	0-0	Mito HollyHock	Ishikawa Athletics Stadium	2,929
4	2016.03.20	Mito HollyHock	2-3	Fagiano Okayama	K's denki Stadium Mito	5,193
5	2016.03.26	FC Gifu	1-0	Mito HollyHock	Gifu Nagaragawa Stadium	4,484
6	2016.04.03	Mito HollyHock	1-0	Thespakusatsu Gunma	K's denki Stadium Mito	4,657
7	2016.04.09	Mito HollyHock	1-2	Ehime FC	K's denki Stadium Mito	4,070
9	2016.04.23	Tokyo Verdy	0-3	Mito HollyHock	Komazawa Olympic Park Stadium	3,999
10	2016.04.29	Mito HollyHock	1-0	JEF United Chiba	K's denki Stadium Mito	6,042
11	2016.05.03	Tokushima Vortis	1-0	Mito HollyHock	Pocarisweat Stadium	3,698
12	2016.05.07	Mito HollyHock	1-1	Giravanz Kitakyushu	K's denki Stadium Mito	3,917
13	2016.05.15	Mito HollyHock	0-1	Hokkaido Consadole Sapporo	K's denki Stadium Mito	6,028
14	2016.05.22	Roasso Kumamoto	0-1	Mito HollyHock	Hitachi Kashiwa Stadium	8,201
15	2016.05.28	Kamatamare Sanuki	1-1	Mito HollyHock	Pikara Stadium	1,924
16	2016.06.04	Mito HollyHock	0-0	Shimizu S-Pulse	K's denki Stadium Mito	8,827
17	2016.06.08	Yokohama FC	1-1	Mito HollyHock	NHK Spring Mitsuzawa Football Stadium	2,077
18	2016.06.12	Mito HollyHock	2-2	FC Machida Zelvia	K's denki Stadium Mito	4,280
19	2016.06.19	Renofa Yamaguchi FC	1-0	Mito HollyHock	Ishin Memorial Park Stadium	4,599
20	2016.06.26	Montedio Yamagata	2-2	Mito HollyHock	ND Soft Stadium Yamagata	5,113
21	2016.07.03	Mito HollyHock	2-3	Matsumoto Yamaga FC	K's denki Stadium Mito	5,328
22	2016.07.10	JEF United Chiba	0-1	Mito HollyHock	Fukuda Denshi Arena	9,132
23	2016.07.16	Mito HollyHock	1-0	FC Gifu	K's denki Stadium Mito	4,318
24	2016.07.20	Mito HollyHock	0-2	V-Varen Nagasaki	K's denki Stadium Mito	3,815
25	2016.07.24	FC Machida Zelvia	3-3	Mito HollyHock	Machida Stadium	3,448
26	2016.07.31	Mito HollyHock	3-0	Zweigen Kanazawa	K's denki Stadium Mito	4,506
27	2016.08.07	Matsumoto Yamaga FC	0-0	Mito HollyHock	Matsumotodaira Park Stadium	13,379
28	2016.08.11	Mito HollyHock	1-1	Roasso Kumamoto	K's denki Stadium Mito	4,952
29	2016.08.15	Thespakusatsu Gunma	2-1	Mito HollyHock	Shoda Shoyu Stadium Gunma	4,002
30	2016.08.21	Mito HollyHock	3-2	Kamatamare Sanuki	K's denki Stadium Mito	4,105
8	2016.09.07	V-Varen Nagasaki	1-1	Mito HollyHock	Transcosmos Stadium Nagasaki	2,294
31	2016.09.11	Mito HollyHock	1-1	Tokyo Verdy	K's denki Stadium Mito	5,631
32	2016.09.18	Shimizu S-Pulse	2-1	Mito HollyHock	IAI Stadium Nihondaira	10,098
33	2016.09.25	Ehime FC	1-1	Mito HollyHock	Ningineer Stadium	2,342
34	2016.10.02	Mito HollyHock	1-0	Montedio Yamagata	K's denki Stadium Mito	4,773
35	2016.10.08	Hokkaido Consadole Sapporo	1-0	Mito HollyHock	Sapporo Atsubetsu Stadium	8,269
36	2016.10.16	Mito HollyHock	1-1	Yokohama FC	K's denki Stadium Mito	5,517
37	2016.10.23	Mito HollyHock	1-1	Kyoto Sanga FC	K's denki Stadium Mito	4,768
38	2016.10.30	Cerezo Osaka	2-2	Mito HollyHock	Kincho Stadium	9,445
39	2016.11.03	Mito HollyHock	0-3	Tokushima Vortis	K's denki Stadium Mito	4,247
40	2016.11.06	Fagiano Okayama	1-2	Mito HollyHock	City Light Stadium	9,216
41	2016.11.12	Giravanz Kitakyushu	2-2	Mito HollyHock	Honjo Stadium	5,689
42	2016.11.20	Mito HollyHock	0-2	Renofa Yamaguchi FC	K's denki Stadium Mito	7,274
