= 2015 Renofa Yamaguchi FC season =

Renofa Yamaguchi FC
2015 season
- Manager: Nobuhiro Ueno
- Stadium: Ishin Memorial Park Stadium
- J3 League: 1st

2015 Renofa Yamaguchi FC season.

== J3 League ==
=== League table ===
Pos	Team	Pld	W	D	L	GF	GA	GD	Pts	Promotion or relegation
1	Renofa Yamaguchi (C, P)	36	25	3	8	96	36	+60	78	Promotion to 2016 J2 League
2	Machida Zelvia (P)	36	23	9	4	52	18	+34	78	Qualification to J2 League promotion playoffs (Note: Only teams that hold a J2 license are eligible for promotion.)
3	Nagano Parceiro	36	21	7	8	46	28	+18	70	
4	SC Sagamihara	36	17	7	12	59	51	+8	58	
5	Kataller Toyama	36	14	10	12	37	36	+1	52	
6	Gainare Tottori	36	14	8	14	47	41	+6	50	

Updated to match(es) played on 23 November 2015. Source: JLeague.jp
Rules for classification: 1) Points; 2) Goal difference; 3) Goals scored; 4th) head-to-head results; 5th) disciplinary points; 6th) draw
(C) Champions; (P) Promoted

=== Match details ===
J3 League match details
Match	Date	Team	Score	Team	Venue	Attendance
1	2015.03.15	Renofa Yamaguchi FC	2-1	Gainare Tottori	Ishin Memorial Park Stadium	7,194
2	2015.03.21	Renofa Yamaguchi FC	8-0	J.League U-22 Selection	Ishin Memorial Park Stadium	3,348
4	2015.04.05	Renofa Yamaguchi FC	3-0	Fujieda MYFC	Ishin Memorial Park Stadium	1,697
5	2015.04.12	Blaublitz Akita	1-2	Renofa Yamaguchi FC	Akigin Stadium	2,281
6	2015.04.19	Renofa Yamaguchi FC	1-0	Kataller Toyama	Ishin Memorial Park Stadium	2,319
7	2015.04.26	AC Nagano Parceiro	2-1	Renofa Yamaguchi FC	Minami Nagano Sports Park Stadium	5,062
8	2015.04.29	Renofa Yamaguchi FC	4-3	FC Ryukyu	Ishin Memorial Park Stadium	3,108
9	2015.05.03	YSCC Yokohama	0-1	Renofa Yamaguchi FC	NHK Spring Mitsuzawa Football Stadium	1,153
10	2015.05.06	Renofa Yamaguchi FC	2-0	SC Sagamihara	Ishin Memorial Park Stadium	5,212
11	2015.05.10	Fukushima United FC	3-4	Renofa Yamaguchi FC	Toho Stadium	1,398
12	2015.05.17	Renofa Yamaguchi FC	4-0	Grulla Morioka	Ishin Memorial Park Stadium	4,021
13	2015.05.24	FC Machida Zelvia	1-0	Renofa Yamaguchi FC	Machida Stadium	3,132
14	2015.05.31	Renofa Yamaguchi FC	3-0	J.League U-22 Selection	Shimonoseki Stadium	2,153
15	2015.06.07	Fujieda MYFC	0-4	Renofa Yamaguchi FC	Fujieda Soccer Stadium	833
16	2015.06.14	Renofa Yamaguchi FC	1-2	FC Machida Zelvia	Shimonoseki Stadium	2,639
17	2015.06.20	Renofa Yamaguchi FC	6-1	YSCC Yokohama	Ishin Memorial Park Stadium	3,722
18	2015.06.28	Kataller Toyama	2-5	Renofa Yamaguchi FC	Toyama Stadium	1,958
19	2015.07.05	Renofa Yamaguchi FC	3-1	Blaublitz Akita	Ishin Memorial Park Stadium	3,514
20	2015.07.12	Renofa Yamaguchi FC	3-2	AC Nagano Parceiro	Ishin Memorial Park Stadium	4,225
22	2015.07.26	SC Sagamihara	0-3	Renofa Yamaguchi FC	Sagamihara Gion Stadium	3,517
23	2015.07.29	Renofa Yamaguchi FC	3-0	Fukushima United FC	Ishin Memorial Park Stadium	4,715
24	2015.08.02	Grulla Morioka	0-1	Renofa Yamaguchi FC	Morioka Minami Park Stadium	855
25	2015.08.09	Gainare Tottori	1-1	Renofa Yamaguchi FC	Tottori Bank Bird Stadium	2,381
26	2015.08.15	Renofa Yamaguchi FC	5-0	FC Ryukyu	Ishin Memorial Park Stadium	8,474
27	2015.09.06	Blaublitz Akita	3-1	Renofa Yamaguchi FC	Akigin Stadium	1,479
28	2015.09.13	Renofa Yamaguchi FC	1-2	Kataller Toyama	Ishin Memorial Park Stadium	4,630
29	2015.09.20	FC Machida Zelvia	1-3	Renofa Yamaguchi FC	Machida Stadium	5,191
30	2015.09.23	Fukushima United FC	2-1	Renofa Yamaguchi FC	Toho Stadium	1,208
31	2015.09.27	Renofa Yamaguchi FC	4-0	YSCC Yokohama	Ishin Memorial Park Stadium	4,510
32	2015.10.04	Renofa Yamaguchi FC	5-0	SC Sagamihara	Shimonoseki Stadium	3,315
33	2015.10.11	FC Ryukyu	0-2	Renofa Yamaguchi FC	Okinawa Athletic Park Stadium	1,018
35	2015.10.25	Renofa Yamaguchi FC	1-2	AC Nagano Parceiro	Ishin Memorial Park Stadium	5,644
36	2015.11.03	Renofa Yamaguchi FC	2-3	Fujieda MYFC	Ishin Memorial Park Stadium	6,586
37	2015.11.08	Grulla Morioka	1-4	Renofa Yamaguchi FC	Morioka Minami Park Stadium	635
38	2015.11.14	Renofa Yamaguchi FC	0-0	J.League U-22 Selection	Ishin Memorial Park Stadium	6,322
39	2015.11.23	Gainare Tottori	2-2	Renofa Yamaguchi FC	Tottori Bank Bird Stadium	4,013
