= 2015 Mito HollyHock season =

Mito HollyHock
2015 season
- Manager: Tetsuji Hashiratani; Takayuki Nishigaya
- Stadium: K's denki Stadium Mito
- J2 League: 19th
Home colours	Away colours

2015 Mito HollyHock season.

== J2 League ==
=== League table ===
Pos	Team	Pld	W	D	L	GF	GA	GD	Pts
18	Thespakusatsu Gunma	42	13	9	20	34	56	−22	48
19	Mito HollyHock	42	10	16	16	40	47	−7	46
20	FC Gifu	42	12	7	23	37	71	−34	43

Source: Meiji Yasuda J2 League Standing
Rules for classification: 1) Points; 2) Goal difference; 3) Goals scored

=== Match details ===
J2 League match details
Match	Date	Team	Score	Team	Venue	Attendance
1	2015.03.08	Mito HollyHock	0-0	Roasso Kumamoto	Kasamatsu Stadium	4,787
2	2015.03.15	JEF United Chiba	2-0	Mito HollyHock	Fukuda Denshi Arena	13,544
3	2015.03.21	Tokyo Verdy	2-0	Mito HollyHock	Ajinomoto Stadium	3,514
4	2015.03.29	Mito HollyHock	3-1	Ehime FC	Kasamatsu Stadium	4,730
5	2015.04.01	Kamatamare Sanuki	0-0	Mito HollyHock	Kagawa Marugame Stadium	2,152
6	2015.04.05	Avispa Fukuoka	1-0	Mito HollyHock	Level5 Stadium	4,553
7	2015.04.11	Mito HollyHock	3-0	Tokushima Vortis	Kasamatsu Stadium	2,290
8	2015.04.19	Consadole Sapporo	1-0	Mito HollyHock	Sapporo Dome	9,138
9	2015.04.26	Omiya Ardija	2-1	Mito HollyHock	NACK5 Stadium Omiya	7,564
10	2015.04.29	Mito HollyHock	1-0	Fagiano Okayama	Kasamatsu Stadium	4,471
11	2015.05.03	Zweigen Kanazawa	1-0	Mito HollyHock	Ishikawa Athletics Stadium	4,407
12	2015.05.06	Mito HollyHock	1-3	V-Varen Nagasaki	Kasamatsu Stadium	4,611
13	2015.05.09	Júbilo Iwata	2-1	Mito HollyHock	Yamaha Stadium	7,816
14	2015.05.17	Mito HollyHock	1-1	Oita Trinita	K's denki Stadium Mito	4,553
15	2015.05.24	Mito HollyHock	0-2	Kyoto Sanga FC	K's denki Stadium Mito	4,023
16	2015.05.31	FC Gifu	1-1	Mito HollyHock	Gifu Nagaragawa Stadium	4,584
17	2015.06.06	Mito HollyHock	1-2	Giravanz Kitakyushu	K's denki Stadium Mito	2,966
18	2015.06.14	Mito HollyHock	1-1	Cerezo Osaka	K's denki Stadium Mito	8,391
19	2015.06.21	Thespakusatsu Gunma	0-1	Mito HollyHock	Shoda Shoyu Stadium Gunma	2,398
20	2015.06.28	Mito HollyHock	0-1	Yokohama FC	K's denki Stadium Mito	5,486
21	2015.07.04	Mito HollyHock	2-1	Tochigi SC	K's denki Stadium Mito	3,744
22	2015.07.08	Oita Trinita	1-1	Mito HollyHock	Oita Bank Dome	4,103
23	2015.07.12	Mito HollyHock	2-2	Avispa Fukuoka	K's denki Stadium Mito	4,161
24	2015.07.18	Ehime FC	0-2	Mito HollyHock	Ningineer Stadium	3,197
25	2015.07.22	Mito HollyHock	1-1	JEF United Chiba	K's denki Stadium Mito	4,832
26	2015.07.26	Yokohama FC	0-2	Mito HollyHock	NHK Spring Mitsuzawa Football Stadium	3,229
27	2015.08.01	Mito HollyHock	1-1	Zweigen Kanazawa	K's denki Stadium Mito	5,431
28	2015.08.08	Tokushima Vortis	1-0	Mito HollyHock	Pocarisweat Stadium	3,958
29	2015.08.15	Mito HollyHock	0-1	Kamatamare Sanuki	K's denki Stadium Mito	4,262
30	2015.08.23	Giravanz Kitakyushu	2-2	Mito HollyHock	Honjo Stadium	3,021
31	2015.09.13	Mito HollyHock	1-0	Omiya Ardija	K's denki Stadium Mito	5,360
32	2015.09.20	Tochigi SC	2-2	Mito HollyHock	Tochigi Green Stadium	4,769
33	2015.09.23	Cerezo Osaka	2-2	Mito HollyHock	Yanmar Stadium Nagai	14,975
34	2015.09.27	Mito HollyHock	0-2	FC Gifu	K's denki Stadium Mito	4,677
35	2015.10.04	Fagiano Okayama	3-0	Mito HollyHock	Tsuyama Stadium	4,346
36	2015.10.10	Mito HollyHock	1-1	Júbilo Iwata	K's denki Stadium Mito	5,452
37	2015.10.18	Mito HollyHock	2-0	Tokyo Verdy	K's denki Stadium Mito	5,163
38	2015.10.25	V-Varen Nagasaki	0-0	Mito HollyHock	Nagasaki Stadium	5,042
39	2015.11.01	Mito HollyHock	0-0	Thespakusatsu Gunma	K's denki Stadium Mito	5,187
40	2015.11.08	Roasso Kumamoto	1-1	Mito HollyHock	Umakana-Yokana Stadium	8,781
41	2015.11.14	Mito HollyHock	2-1	Consadole Sapporo	K's denki Stadium Mito	6,555
42	2015.11.23	Kyoto Sanga FC	2-1	Mito HollyHock	Kyoto Nishikyogoku Athletic Stadium	7,541
