= Frank Romero (footballer) =

Peruvian footballer (born 1987)

Frank Romero ロメロ・フランク
Personal information
- Full name: Frank Lark Romero Berrocal
- Date of birth: 19 August 1987 (age 39)
- Place of birth: Lima, Peru
- Height: 1.77 m (5 ft 9 1/2 in)
- Position: Midfielder

Team information
- Current team: Reilac Shiga
- Number: 24

Youth career
- 2004–2006: Aomori Yamada High School

College career
Years	Team	Apps	(Gls)
2007–2010	Ryutsu Keizai University		

Senior career*
Years	Team	Apps	(Gls)
2011–2012	Mito HollyHock	72	(8)
2013–2015	Montedio Yamagata	96	(11)
2016–2017	Albirex Niigata	11	(0)
2016	→ Mito HollyHock (loan)	36	(3)
2018–2019	Machida Zelvia	56	(13)
2020–2021	Albirex Niigata	57	(11)
2022–2023	Kagoshima United	49	(9)
2024–	Reilac Shiga	56	(11)
Medal record
Montedio Yamagata
Runner-up	Emperor's Cup	2014
- * Club domestic league appearances and goals as of 23 August 2026

Frank Lark Romero Berrocal (Spanish pronunciation: [roˈmeɾo ˈfɾaŋk]; ロメロ・フランク; Romero Furanku; born August 19, 1987), also known as Frank Romero, is a Peruvian footballer who plays as a midfielder and currently play for J3 League club Reilac Shiga.

== Club career ==
Romero moved to Japan to pursue academics, but a football scout identified him and he began a professional football career with Mito HollyHock. He would also play for Montedio Yamagata and Albirex Niigata, debuting in the J1 League with the former.

On 28 December 2021, Romero joined to J3 League club, Kagoshima United from Albirex Niigata as free transfer for 2022 season.

On 2 December 2023, Romero was brought his club promotion to J2 after draw against Gainare Tottori 1–1 in final day at matchweek 38 in J3 and secure return to second tier after 4 years absence. 29 days later at same month, Romero announcement officially left from the club after two years at club.

On 31 January 2024, Romero announced that he would officially transfer to JFL club, Reilac Shiga ahead of the 2024 season.

== Personal life ==
Born in Lima, Peru. He moved to Japan at youth age.

He is third-generation Japanese Peruvian.

Romero obtained Japanese citizenship on 26 September 2019.

== Career statistics ==
=== Club ===
As of the start for 2025 season.

Appearances and goals by club, season and competition
Club performance			League		Cup		League Cup		Total	
Season	Club	League	Apps	Goals	Apps	Goals	Apps	Goals	Apps	Goals
Japan			League		Emperor's Cup		J.League Cup		Total	
2007	Ryutsu Keizai University	Japan Football League	4	1	0	0	–		4	1
2008	Ryutsu Keizai University	Japan Football League	16	1	0	0	–		16	1
2009	Ryutsu Keizai University	Japan Football League	17	7	2	1	–		19	8
2010	Ryutsu Keizai University	–			1	0	–		1	0
2011	Mito HollyHock	J.League Div 2	31	3	2	1	–		33	4
2012	Mito HollyHock	J.League Div 2	41	5	2	0	–		43	5
2013	Montedio Yamagata	J.League Div 2	37	7	3	1	–		40	8
2014	Montedio Yamagata	J.League Div 2	28	1	5	1	–		33	2
2015	Montedio Yamagata	J1 League	31	3	3	0	4	0	38	3
2016	Mito HollyHock (loan)	J2 League	36	3	1	0	–		37	3
2017	Albirex Niigata	J1 League	11	0	1	0	3	0	15	0
2018	Machida Zelvia	J2 League	23	4	0	0	–		23	4
2019	Machida Zelvia	J2 League	33	9	2	0	–		35	9
2020	Albirex Niigata	J2 League	29	5	0	0	–		29	5
2021	Albirex Niigata	J2 League	28	6	0	0	–		28	6
2022	Kagoshima United	J3 League	30	8	1	0	–		31	8
2023	Kagoshima United	J3 League	19	1	0	0	–		19	1
2024	Reilac Shiga	Japan Football League	26	8	0	0	–		26	8
2025	Reilac Shiga	Japan Football League	0	0	0	0	–		0	0
Career total			440	72	21	4	7	0	468	76

== Honours ==
Montedio Yamagata

- Emperor's Cup : 2014

Kagoshima United

- Promotion to J2 League: 2023
