= Naoki Wako =

Japanese footballer (born 1989)

Naoki Wako 輪湖 直樹
Personal information
- Full name: Naoki Wako
- Date of birth: 26 November 1989 (age 36)
- Place of birth: Fujishiro, Ibaraki, Japan
- Height: 1.71 m (5 ft 7 in)
- Positions: Left midfielder; left back

Youth career
- 1999–2007: Kashiwa Reysol Youth

Senior career*
Years	Team	Apps	(Gls)
2008–2009	Ventforet Kofu	33	(1)
2010–2011	Tokushima Vortis	20	(0)
2012–2013	Mito HollyHock	58	(1)
2014–2017	Kashiwa Reysol	89	(4)
2018–2022	Avispa Fukuoka	111	(0)
- * Club domestic league appearances and goals as of 13:20, 15 February 2023 (UTC)

Naoki Wako (輪湖 直樹, Wako Naoki; born 26 November 1989) is a Japanese footballer who last played for J1 League club Avispa Fukuoka.

== Career ==
Following five seasons and over 100 appearances for Avispa Fukuoka from 2018, he was released in December 2022.

== Club statistics ==
As of 15 February 2023.

Club performance			League		Cup		League Cup		Continental		Total	
Season	Club	League	Apps	Goals	Apps	Goals	Apps	Goals	Apps	Goals	Apps	Goals
Japan			League		Emperor's Cup		J. League Cup		AFC		Total	
2008	Ventforet Kofu	J2 League	28	1	2	0	–		–		30	1
2009	Ventforet Kofu	J2 League	10	0	0	0	–		–		10	0
2010	Tokushima Vortis	J2 League	19	0	1	0	–		–		20	0
2011	Tokushima Vortis	J2 League	1	0	0	0	–		–		1	0
2012	Mito HollyHock	J2 League	30	0	0	0	–		–		31	0
2013	Mito HollyHock	J2 League	28	1	2	0	–		–		30	1
2014	Kashiwa Reysol	J1 League	4	0	0	0	3	0	–		7	0
2015	Kashiwa Reysol	J1 League	29	2	3	0	0	0	6	1	38	3
2016	Kashiwa Reysol	J1 League	29	2	3	1	5	1	–		37	4
2017	Kashiwa Reysol	J1 League	27	0	3	0	3	0	–		33	0
2018	Avispa Fukuoka	J2 League	34	0	0	0	–		–		34	0
2019	Avispa Fukuoka	J2 League	29	0	1	0	–		–		30	0
2020	Avispa Fukuoka	J2 League	34	0	–		–		–		34	0
2021	Avispa Fukuoka	J1 League	12	0	2	0	5	0	–		19	0
2022	Avispa Fukuoka	J1 League	2	0	4	0	8	0	–		14	0
Total			316	6	21	1	24	1	6	1	361	9
