= Takuma Hamasaki =

Japanese footballer

Takuma Hamasaki 浜崎 拓磨
Personal information
- Full name: Takuma Hamasaki
- Date of birth: February 17, 1993 (age 33)
- Place of birth: Settsu, Osaka, Japan
- Height: 1.75 m (5 ft 9 in)
- Position: Defender

Team information
- Current team: Matsumoto Yamaga
- Number: 20

Youth career
- 2011–2014: Osaka Gakuin University

Senior career*
Years	Team	Apps	(Gls)
2015–2016	FC Osaka	43	(0)
2017–2019	Mito HollyHock	37	(1)
2020	Vegalta Sendai	24	(1)
2021–	Matsumoto Yamaga		
- * Club domestic league appearances and goals as of 2 January 2021

Takuma Hamasaki (浜崎 拓磨, Hamasaki Takuma; born February 17, 1993) is a Japanese football player. He plays for Vegalta Sendai.

== Career ==
Takuma Hamasaki joined Japan Football League club FC Osaka in 2015. In 2017, he moved to J2 League club Mito HollyHock.

== Club statistics ==
Updated to January 1, 2021.

Club performance			League		Cup		League Cup		Total	
Season	Club	League	Apps	Goals	Apps	Goals	Apps	Goals	Apps	Goals
Japan			League		Emperor's Cup		Total			
2015	FC Osaka	JFL	16	0	0	0	-		16	0
2016	FC Osaka	JFL	27	0	0	0	-		27	0
2017	Mito HollyHock	J2 League	19	0	0	0	-		19	0
2018	Mito HollyHock	J2 League	12	0	1	0	-		13	0
2019	Mito HollyHock	J2 League	6	1	2	0	-		8	1
2020	Vegalta Sendai	J1 League	24	1	-		1	0	25	1
Total			104	2	3	0	1	0	108	2
