= 2011 Mito HollyHock season =

Mito HollyHock
2011 season
- Manager: Tetsuji Hashiratani
- Stadium: K's denki Stadium Mito
- J2 League: 17 th
Home colours	Away colours

2011 Mito HollyHock season.

== J2 League ==
Match	Date	Team	Score	Team	Venue	Attendance
1	2011.03.05	Mito HollyHock	2-1	Kyoto Sanga FC	K's denki Stadium Mito	4,222
8	2011.04.23	Mito HollyHock	2-1	Tokushima Vortis	K's denki Stadium Mito	1,273
9	2011.04.30	FC Gifu	2-1	Mito HollyHock	Gifu Nagaragawa Stadium	5,832
10	2011.05.04	Mito HollyHock	0-0	Shonan Bellmare	K's denki Stadium Mito	4,086
11	2011.05.08	Giravanz Kitakyushu	1-0	Mito HollyHock	Honjo Stadium	3,199
12	2011.05.14	Mito HollyHock	0-0	Roasso Kumamoto	K's denki Stadium Mito	2,694
13	2011.05.22	Gainare Tottori	1-1	Mito HollyHock	Tottori Bank Bird Stadium	2,659
14	2011.05.28	Mito HollyHock	0-5	Sagan Tosu	K's denki Stadium Mito	1,794
15	2011.06.04	Tochigi SC	0-0	Mito HollyHock	Tochigi Green Stadium	3,931
16	2011.06.12	Mito HollyHock	3-0	Kataller Toyama	K's denki Stadium Mito	2,582
17	2011.06.19	Fagiano Okayama	0-1	Mito HollyHock	Kanko Stadium	7,031
18	2011.06.25	Mito HollyHock	2-3	FC Tokyo	K's denki Stadium Mito	5,021
2	2011.06.29	Tokyo Verdy	3-2	Mito HollyHock	Ajinomoto Stadium	2,164
19	2011.07.02	Thespa Kusatsu	1-2	Mito HollyHock	Shoda Shoyu Stadium Gunma	3,654
20	2011.07.09	Mito HollyHock	0-1	Yokohama FC	K's denki Stadium Mito	4,719
21	2011.07.16	Consadole Sapporo	2-1	Mito HollyHock	Sapporo Atsubetsu Stadium	4,609
22	2011.07.23	Kataller Toyama	2-0	Mito HollyHock	Kataller Toyama	3,310
23	2011.07.31	Mito HollyHock	3-1	Ehime FC	K's denki Stadium Mito	3,032
3	2011.08.07	Yokohama FC	1-0	Mito HollyHock	NHK Spring Mitsuzawa Football Stadium	3,934
24	2011.08.14	Tokushima Vortis	1-1	Mito HollyHock	Pocarisweat Stadium	5,252
25	2011.08.21	Mito HollyHock	1-2	FC Gifu	K's denki Stadium Mito	2,778
26	2011.08.28	Sagan Tosu	2-1	Mito HollyHock	Best Amenity Stadium	5,816
4	2011.09.03	Mito HollyHock	1-2	Consadole Sapporo	K's denki Stadium Mito	2,748
27	2011.09.11	Mito HollyHock	0-2	Oita Trinita	K's denki Stadium Mito	3,017
28	2011.09.18	Shonan Bellmare	3-2	Mito HollyHock	Hiratsuka Stadium	7,547
29	2011.09.25	Mito HollyHock	1-1	Fagiano Okayama	K's denki Stadium Mito	3,022
5	2011.09.28	Oita Trinita	0-0	Mito HollyHock	Oita Bank Dome	5,196
30	2011.10.02	Kyoto Sanga FC	0-2	Mito HollyHock	Kyoto Nishikyogoku Athletic Stadium	4,465
31	2011.10.16	Mito HollyHock	1-1	Tokyo Verdy	K's denki Stadium Mito	3,947
6	2011.10.19	Mito HollyHock	1-0	JEF United Chiba	K's denki Stadium Mito	2,155
32	2011.10.23	Roasso Kumamoto	2-1	Mito HollyHock	Roasso Kumamoto	9,461
7	2011.10.26	Ehime FC	0-1	Mito HollyHock	Ningineer Stadium	1,563
33	2011.10.30	Mito HollyHock	2-2	Thespa Kusatsu	K's denki Stadium Mito	4,050
34	2011.11.06	Mito HollyHock	1-0	Giravanz Kitakyushu	K's denki Stadium Mito	2,511
35	2011.11.12	FC Tokyo	2-0	Mito HollyHock	Ajinomoto Stadium	22,896
36	2011.11.20	Mito HollyHock	0-1	Tochigi SC	K's denki Stadium Mito	4,759
37	2011.11.27	Mito HollyHock	3-1	Gainare Tottori	K's denki Stadium Mito	5,227
38	2011.12.03	JEF United Chiba	2-1	Mito HollyHock	Fukuda Denshi Arena	7,463
