= 2013 Mito HollyHock season =

Mito HollyHock
2013 season
- Manager: Tetsuji Hashiratani
- Stadium: K's denki Stadium Mito
- J2 League: 15th
Home colours	Away colours

2013 Mito HollyHock season.

== J2 League ==
Match	Date	Team	Score	Team	Venue	Attendance
1	2013.03.03	Mito HollyHock	1-1	Thespakusatsu Gunma	K's denki Stadium Mito	5,537
2	2013.03.10	Mito HollyHock	1-0	Kataller Toyama	K's denki Stadium Mito	2,895
3	2013.03.17	Gainare Tottori	3-1	Mito HollyHock	Tottori Bank Bird Stadium	6,467
4	2013.03.20	Fagiano Okayama	1-1	Mito HollyHock	Kanko Stadium	6,279
5	2013.03.24	Mito HollyHock	0-1	Ehime FC	K's denki Stadium Mito	2,584
6	2013.03.31	Avispa Fukuoka	1-1	Mito HollyHock	Level5 Stadium	4,104
7	2013.04.07	Mito HollyHock	1-2	Matsumoto Yamaga FC	K's denki Stadium Mito	2,513
8	2013.04.14	Tochigi SC	0-1	Mito HollyHock	Tochigi Green Stadium	4,606
9	2013.04.17	Mito HollyHock	2-0	JEF United Chiba	K's denki Stadium Mito	2,648
10	2013.04.21	Giravanz Kitakyushu	0-2	Mito HollyHock	Honjo Stadium	2,311
11	2013.04.28	Mito HollyHock	2-2	Yokohama FC	K's denki Stadium Mito	6,175
12	2013.05.03	Roasso Kumamoto	3-2	Mito HollyHock	Umakana-Yokana Stadium	6,442
13	2013.05.06	Mito HollyHock	0-0	V-Varen Nagasaki	K's denki Stadium Mito	4,280
14	2013.05.12	Tokushima Vortis	3-1	Mito HollyHock	Pocarisweat Stadium	2,797
15	2013.05.19	Mito HollyHock	4-1	FC Gifu	K's denki Stadium Mito	2,851
16	2013.05.26	Consadole Sapporo	0-1	Mito HollyHock	Sapporo Atsubetsu Stadium	8,590
17	2013.06.01	Mito HollyHock	0-2	Vissel Kobe	K's denki Stadium Mito	6,516
18	2013.06.08	Tokyo Verdy	0-0	Mito HollyHock	Komazawa Olympic Park Stadium	5,840
19	2013.06.15	Mito HollyHock	0-2	Gamba Osaka	K's denki Stadium Mito	10,025
20	2013.06.22	Kyoto Sanga FC	0-1	Mito HollyHock	Kyoto Nishikyogoku Athletic Stadium	10,120
21	2013.06.29	Mito HollyHock	1-3	Montedio Yamagata	K's denki Stadium Mito	5,746
22	2013.07.03	Matsumoto Yamaga FC	2-0	Mito HollyHock	Matsumotodaira Park Stadium	7,153
23	2013.07.07	Thespakusatsu Gunma	0-1	Mito HollyHock	Shoda Shoyu Stadium Gunma	3,883
24	2013.07.14	Mito HollyHock	1-0	Fagiano Okayama	K's denki Stadium Mito	4,020
25	2013.07.20	Mito HollyHock	2-2	Gainare Tottori	K's denki Stadium Mito	4,201
26	2013.07.27	V-Varen Nagasaki	0-2	Mito HollyHock	Nagasaki Stadium	3,063
27	2013.08.04	JEF United Chiba	2-0	Mito HollyHock	Fukuda Denshi Arena	9,658
28	2013.08.11	Mito HollyHock	4-3	Tochigi SC	K's denki Stadium Mito	5,195
29	2013.08.18	FC Gifu	1-4	Mito HollyHock	Gifu Nagaragawa Stadium	3,765
30	2013.08.21	Mito HollyHock	0-0	Avispa Fukuoka	K's denki Stadium Mito	2,826
31	2013.08.25	Mito HollyHock	1-3	Consadole Sapporo	K's denki Stadium Mito	5,609
32	2013.09.01	Montedio Yamagata	2-1	Mito HollyHock	ND Soft Stadium Yamagata	6,428
33	2013.09.15	Gamba Osaka	5-0	Mito HollyHock	Expo '70 Commemorative Stadium	6,559
34	2013.09.22	Mito HollyHock	1-1	Roasso Kumamoto	K's denki Stadium Mito	4,601
35	2013.09.29	Vissel Kobe	1-1	Mito HollyHock	Noevir Stadium Kobe	9,878
36	2013.10.06	Mito HollyHock	0-0	Tokushima Vortis	K's denki Stadium Mito	3,715
37	2013.10.20	Mito HollyHock	2-2	Giravanz Kitakyushu	K's denki Stadium Mito	2,261
38	2013.10.27	Kataller Toyama	2-1	Mito HollyHock	Toyama Stadium	4,056
39	2013.11.03	Ehime FC	2-2	Mito HollyHock	Ningineer Stadium	2,934
40	2013.11.10	Mito HollyHock	1-0	Tokyo Verdy	K's denki Stadium Mito	4,773
41	2013.11.17	Mito HollyHock	2-1	Kyoto Sanga FC	K's denki Stadium Mito	8,266
42	2013.11.24	Yokohama FC	4-1	Mito HollyHock	NHK Spring Mitsuzawa Football Stadium	6,975
