= Tsukasa Ozawa =

Japanese footballer

Personal information
- Date of birth: May 8, 1988 (age 38)
- Place of birth: Odawara, Kanagawa, Japan
- Height: 1.62 m (5 ft 4 in)
- Position: Midfielder

Team information
- Current team: FC Imabari
- Number: 28

Youth career
- 2007–2010: University of Tsukuba

Senior career*
Years	Team	Apps	(Gls)
2011–2014	Mito HollyHock	127	(21)
2015–2016	Suzuka Unlimited FC		
2017–	FC Imabari		
- * Club domestic league appearances and goals as of 27 February 2017

Tsukasa Ozawa (小澤 司, Ozawa Tsukasa; born May 8, 1988) is a Japanese football player for FC Imabari.

== Club statistics ==
Updated to 20 February 2017.

Club performance			League		Cup		Total	
Season	Club	League	Apps	Goals	Apps	Goals	Apps	Goals
Japan			League		Emperor's Cup		Total	
2011	Mito HollyHock	J2 League	29	5	3	2	32	7
2012	Mito HollyHock	J2 League	39	7	1	0	40	7
2013	Mito HollyHock	J2 League	33	5	0	0	33	5
2014	Mito HollyHock	J2 League	26	4	2	0	28	4
2015	Suzuka; Unlimited FC	JRL (Tokai, Div. 1)	0	0	0	0	0	0
2016	Suzuka; Unlimited FC	JRL (Tokai, Div. 1)	0	0	0	0	0	0
Total			127	21	6	2	133	21
