= Yuki Shimada =

Japanese footballer

Personal information
- Full name: Yuki Shimada
- Date of birth: November 18, 1986 (age 39)
- Place of birth: Saitama, Japan
- Height: 1.67 m (5 ft 5 1/2 in)
- Position: Midfielder

Team information
- Current team: Vonds Ichihara
- Number: 20

Youth career
- 2005–2008: Komazawa University

Senior career*
Years	Team	Apps	(Gls)
2009–2014	Mito HollyHock	109	(8)
2014	ReinMeer Aomori		
2015–	Vonds Ichihara		
Total		109	(8)
- * Club domestic league appearances and goals as of December 31, 2015

Yuki Shimada (島田 祐輝, Shimada Yūki; born November 18, 1986) is a Japanese football player. He plays for Vonds Ichihara.

== Career statistics ==
Appearances and goals by club, season and competition
Club	Season	League			Emperor's Cup		J.League Cup		Total	
Club	Season	Division	Apps	Goals	Apps	Goals	Apps	Goals	Apps	Goals
Mito HollyHock	2009	J2 League	13	0	0	0	—		13	0
Mito HollyHock	2010	J2 League	17	0	2	1	—		19	1
Mito HollyHock	2011	J2 League					—			
Career total			30	0	2	1	0	0	32	1
