= 2014 Mito HollyHock season =

Mito HollyHock
2014 season
- Manager: Tetsuji Hashiratani
- Stadium: K's denki Stadium Mito
- J2 League: 15th
Home colours	Away colours

2014 Mito HollyHock season.

== J2 League ==
Match	Date	Team	Score	Team	Venue	Attendance
1	2014.03.02	Mito HollyHock	2-1	Oita Trinita	K's denki Stadium Mito	4,280
2	2014.03.09	Ehime FC	0-2	Mito HollyHock	Ningineer Stadium	4,327
3	2014.03.16	Giravanz Kitakyushu	1-0	Mito HollyHock	Honjo Stadium	2,903
4	2014.03.22	Mito HollyHock	0-1	Fagiano Okayama	K's denki Stadium Mito	4,695
5	2014.03.30	Montedio Yamagata	0-0	Mito HollyHock	ND Soft Stadium Yamagata	4,270
6	2014.04.05	Mito HollyHock	1-2	JEF United Chiba	K's denki Stadium Mito	4,140
7	2014.04.13	Thespakusatsu Gunma	0-1	Mito HollyHock	Shoda Shoyu Stadium Gunma	6,407
8	2014.04.20	Mito HollyHock	1-1	Tokyo Verdy	K's denki Stadium Mito	3,359
9	2014.04.26	Tochigi SC	0-1	Mito HollyHock	Tochigi Green Stadium	4,069
10	2014.04.29	Mito HollyHock	0-0	Roasso Kumamoto	K's denki Stadium Mito	3,431
11	2014.05.03	Mito HollyHock	0-1	Shonan Bellmare	K's denki Stadium Mito	5,504
12	2014.05.06	V-Varen Nagasaki	1-1	Mito HollyHock	Nagasaki Stadium	4,478
13	2014.05.11	Mito HollyHock	3-2	FC Gifu	K's denki Stadium Mito	5,053
14	2014.05.18	Mito HollyHock	5-1	Kyoto Sanga FC	K's denki Stadium Mito	4,423
15	2014.05.25	Consadole Sapporo	4-0	Mito HollyHock	Sapporo Dome	6,966
16	2014.05.31	Mito HollyHock	1-2	Matsumoto Yamaga FC	K's denki Stadium Mito	5,060
17	2014.06.07	Júbilo Iwata	1-0	Mito HollyHock	Yamaha Stadium	9,172
18	2014.06.14	Kataller Toyama	0-3	Mito HollyHock	Toyama Stadium	3,240
19	2014.06.21	Mito HollyHock	1-2	Avispa Fukuoka	K's denki Stadium Mito	6,065
20	2014.06.28	Kamatamare Sanuki	0-0	Mito HollyHock	Kagawa Marugame Stadium	2,328
21	2014.07.05	Yokohama FC	1-1	Mito HollyHock	NHK Spring Mitsuzawa Football Stadium	3,734
22	2014.07.20	Mito HollyHock	2-0	Thespakusatsu Gunma	K's denki Stadium Mito	5,776
23	2014.07.26	Roasso Kumamoto	2-1	Mito HollyHock	Umakana-Yokana Stadium	10,232
24	2014.07.30	Mito HollyHock	0-0	V-Varen Nagasaki	K's denki Stadium Mito	3,711
25	2014.08.03	Kyoto Sanga FC	1-1	Mito HollyHock	Kyoto Nishikyogoku Athletic Stadium	5,119
26	2014.08.10	Mito HollyHock	1-1	Giravanz Kitakyushu	K's denki Stadium Mito	3,501
27	2014.08.17	Tokyo Verdy	1-0	Mito HollyHock	Ajinomoto Field Nishigaoka	4,219
28	2014.08.24	Mito HollyHock	0-0	Ehime FC	K's denki Stadium Mito	5,242
29	2014.08.31	JEF United Chiba	1-0	Mito HollyHock	Fukuda Denshi Arena	7,734
30	2014.09.06	Mito HollyHock	0-1	Montedio Yamagata	K's denki Stadium Mito	4,449
31	2014.09.14	Avispa Fukuoka	0-1	Mito HollyHock	Level5 Stadium	4,651
32	2014.09.20	Shonan Bellmare	4-2	Mito HollyHock	Shonan BMW Stadium Hiratsuka	7,101
33	2014.09.23	Mito HollyHock	4-1	Júbilo Iwata	K's denki Stadium Mito	7,033
34	2014.09.28	Fagiano Okayama	1-1	Mito HollyHock	Kanko Stadium	7,980
35	2014.10.04	Mito HollyHock	0-0	Consadole Sapporo	K's denki Stadium Mito	5,297
36	2014.10.11	Mito HollyHock	2-3	Kataller Toyama	K's denki Stadium Mito	3,818
37	2014.10.19	FC Gifu	0-2	Mito HollyHock	Gifu Nagaragawa Stadium	5,524
38	2014.10.26	Mito HollyHock	0-0	Kamatamare Sanuki	K's denki Stadium Mito	3,444
39	2014.11.01	Mito HollyHock	2-2	Yokohama FC	K's denki Stadium Mito	4,121
40	2014.11.09	Oita Trinita	2-3	Mito HollyHock	Oita Bank Dome	7,678
41	2014.11.15	Mito HollyHock	1-2	Tochigi SC	K's denki Stadium Mito	7,020
42	2014.11.23	Matsumoto Yamaga FC	3-0	Mito HollyHock	Matsumotodaira Park Stadium	18,496
