= Kenta Nishioka =

Japanese footballer

Kenta Nishioka 西岡謙太
Personal information
- Full name: Kenta Nishioka
- Date of birth: April 15, 1987 (age 39)
- Place of birth: Matsuyama, Ehime, Japan
- Height: 1.73 m (5 ft 8 in)
- Position: Midfielder

Youth career
- 2003–2005: Kagoshima Jitsugyō High School
- 2006–2009: Kansai University

Senior career*
Years	Team	Apps	(Gls)
2010–2014	Mito HollyHock	149	(5)
2015–2016	Ang Thong		
2016–2019	Kagoshima United FC	36	(1)
- * Club domestic league appearances and goals as of 10 January 2020

Kenta Nishioka (西岡 謙太, Nishioka Kenta; born April 15, 1987 in Ehime) is a Japanese former football player who last played for Kagoshima United FC.

== Career ==
Nishioka was released by Kagoshima United at the end of the 2019 season. He later retired and was appointed as head coach of Kagoshima United's U-15 academy team.

== Career statistics ==
Updated to 10 January 2020.

Club performance			League		Cup		League Cup		Total	
Season	Club	League	Apps	Goals	Apps	Goals	Apps	Goals	Apps	Goals
Japan			League		Emperor's Cup		League Cup		Total	
2010	Mito HollyHock	J2 League	18	0	0	0	-		18	0
2011	Mito HollyHock	J2 League	38	0	3	0	-		41	0
2012	Mito HollyHock	J2 League	35	2	2	0	-		37	2
2013	Mito HollyHock	J2 League	37	2	1	0	-		38	2
2014	Mito HollyHock	J2 League	21	1	1	0	-		22	1
2016	Kagoshima United FC	J3 League	4	0	0	0	-		4	0
2017	Kagoshima United FC	J3 League	9	0	0	0	-		9	0
2018	Kagoshima United FC	J3 League	21	1	1	0	-		22	1
2019	Kagoshima United FC	J2 League	2	0	1	0	-		3	0
Career total			185	6	9	0	-		194	6
