= Saving Athletic Stadium =

Athletic stadium in Shimonoseki, Yamaguchi, Japan

Shimonoseki Stadium
- 下関市営下関陸上競技場
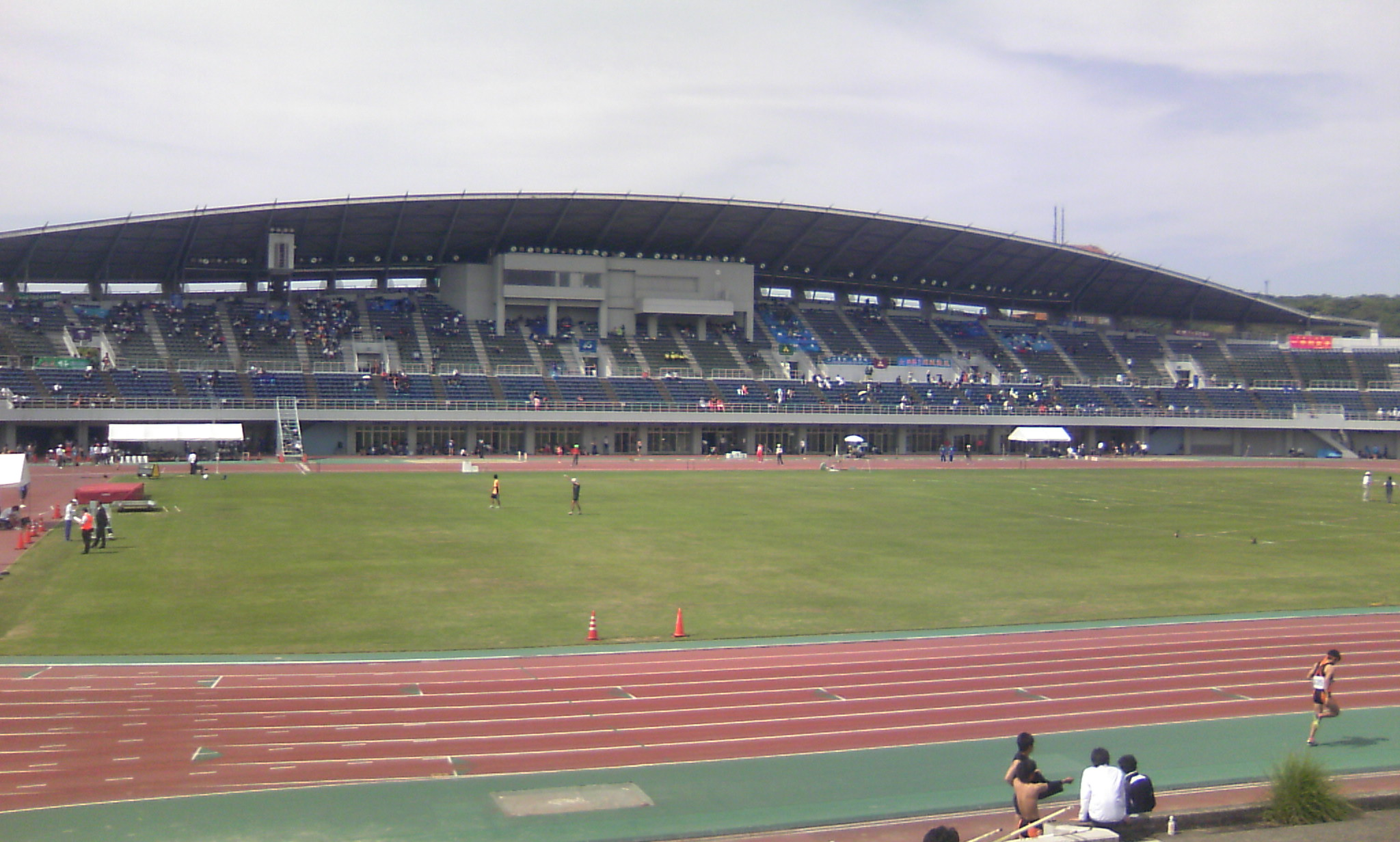
- Interactive map of Shimonoseki Stadium
- Location: Shimonoseki, Yamaguchi, Japan
- Coordinates: 33.9663°N 130.9333°E
- Owner: Shimonoseki City
- Capacity: 23,939

Construction
- Opened: 1958

Tenants
- Renofa Yamaguchi FC; FC Baleine Shimonoseki

Website
- Official site

Shimonoseki Stadium (下関市営下関陸上競技場) is an athletic stadium in Shimonoseki, Yamaguchi Prefecture, Japan.

It is the home stadium of football clubs Renofa Yamaguchi FC and FC Baleine Shimonoseki.
