= Ishin Me-Life Stadium =

Athletic stadium in Yamaguchi, Japan

Coordinates: 34°09′16″N 131°26′15″E

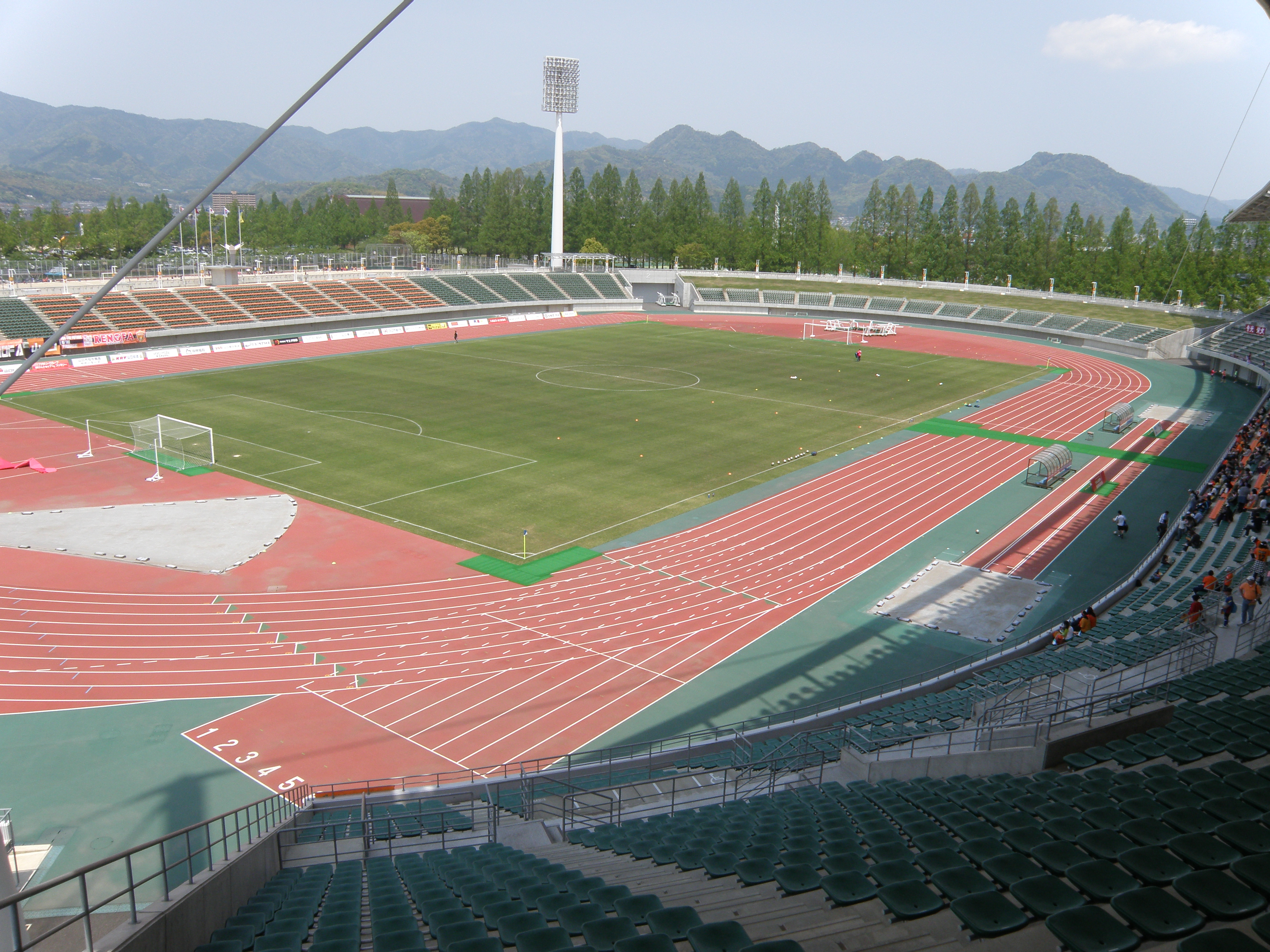
- Interactive map of Ishin Me-Life Stadium
- Former names: Ishin Memorial Park Stadium (1963–2017)
- Location: Yamaguchi, Yamaguchi, Japan
- Owner: Yamaguchi Prefecture
- Capacity: Approx. 20,000; J.League:15,115

Construction
- Opened: 1963
- Renovated: 2011

Tenants
- Renofa Yamaguchi FC; Chūgoku Soccer League

Ishin Me-Life Stadium (維新みらいふスタジアム) is an athletic stadium in Yamaguchi, Japan. It was formerly known as Ishin Memorial Park Stadium after the Ishin (Restoration, meaning the Meiji Restoration in which the Choshu Domain played a large part). Since January 2018 it has been called Ishin Me-Life Stadium for the naming rights.

The stadium is opened for 18th National Sports Festival of Japan in 1963, and renovated for 66th National Sports Festival of Japan in 2011.

The stadium is home to the professional football team Renofa Yamaguchi FC.

== Naming rights ==
Yamaguchi Prefecture decided to introduce naming rights for a prefectural facility for the first time as a way to fund its administrative and financial reforms. The naming rights holder had to pay at least 10 million yen per year for a 3-to-5-year contract and include the words “Athletics Stadium”, “Stadium” or “Restoration” in the nickname. The prefecture sought applications from October 10, 2017, to October 31, 2017. Two parties applied, and the prefecture chose a building material sales company based in Hofu City with a group company in Kurume City, Fukuoka Prefecture (Mita Industry). The nickname of the facility became “Ishin Me-Life Stadium”. The contract was for five years from January 12, 2018, with a yearly payment of twelve million yen (excluding tax). The contract was extended for another two years until January 11, 2025, in December 2022.
