= Ningineer Stadium =

Stadium in Matsuyama, Japan

- Ninsta
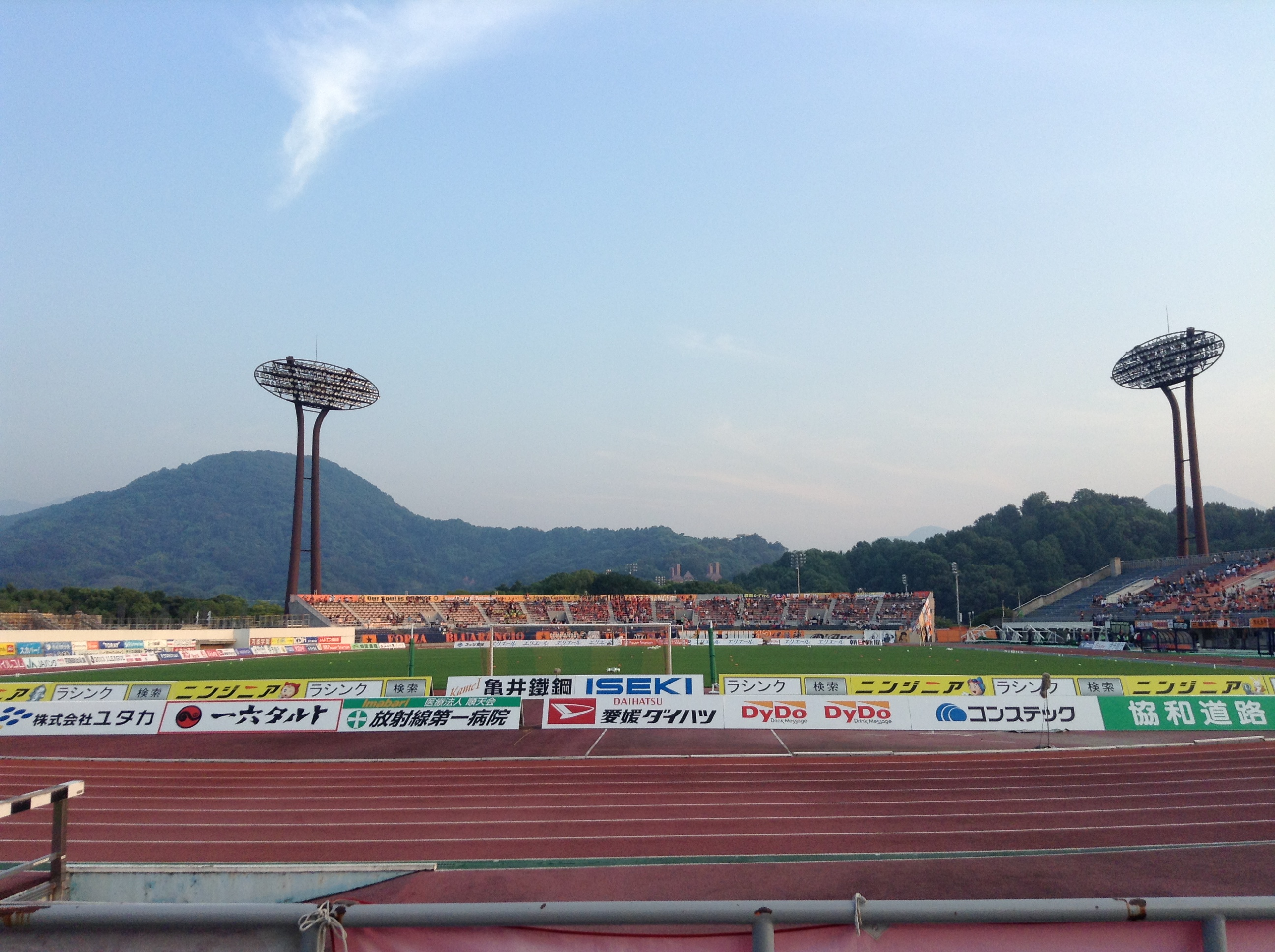

- Location within Ehime Prefecture Location within Japan
- Interactive map of Ningineer Stadium
- Former names: Ehime Matsuyama Athletic Stadium (1979–2008)
- Location: Matsuyama, Japan
- Coordinates: 33°46′5.44″N 132°47′51.34″E
- Owner: Ehime Prefecture
- Operator: NINGINEER Network Co.
- Capacity: 20,983
- Surface: Grass
- Scoreboard: Diamond Vision
- Field size: 106m × 69.5m

Construction
- Opened: 1979
- Renovated: 2005

Tenants
- Ehime FC; Ehime FC Ladies

Ningineer Stadium (ニンジニアスタジアム) a.k.a. Ehime Matsuyama Athletic Stadium or Ehime Prefectural Sports Park Stadium (愛媛県総合運動公園陸上競技場) is a multi-use stadium in Matsuyama, Ehime, Japan, home of Ehime FC. It is a stadium with four concrete stands around the 8-lane athletic track and the grass field. The stadium's capacity is 20,983 people. Since March 2008, Ehime Prefecture sold the naming rights of the stadium to Ningineer Network Co., Ltd., in order to increase revenue for a future renovation of the stadium.
