= K's denki Stadium Mito =

Multi-purpose stadium in Mito, Japan

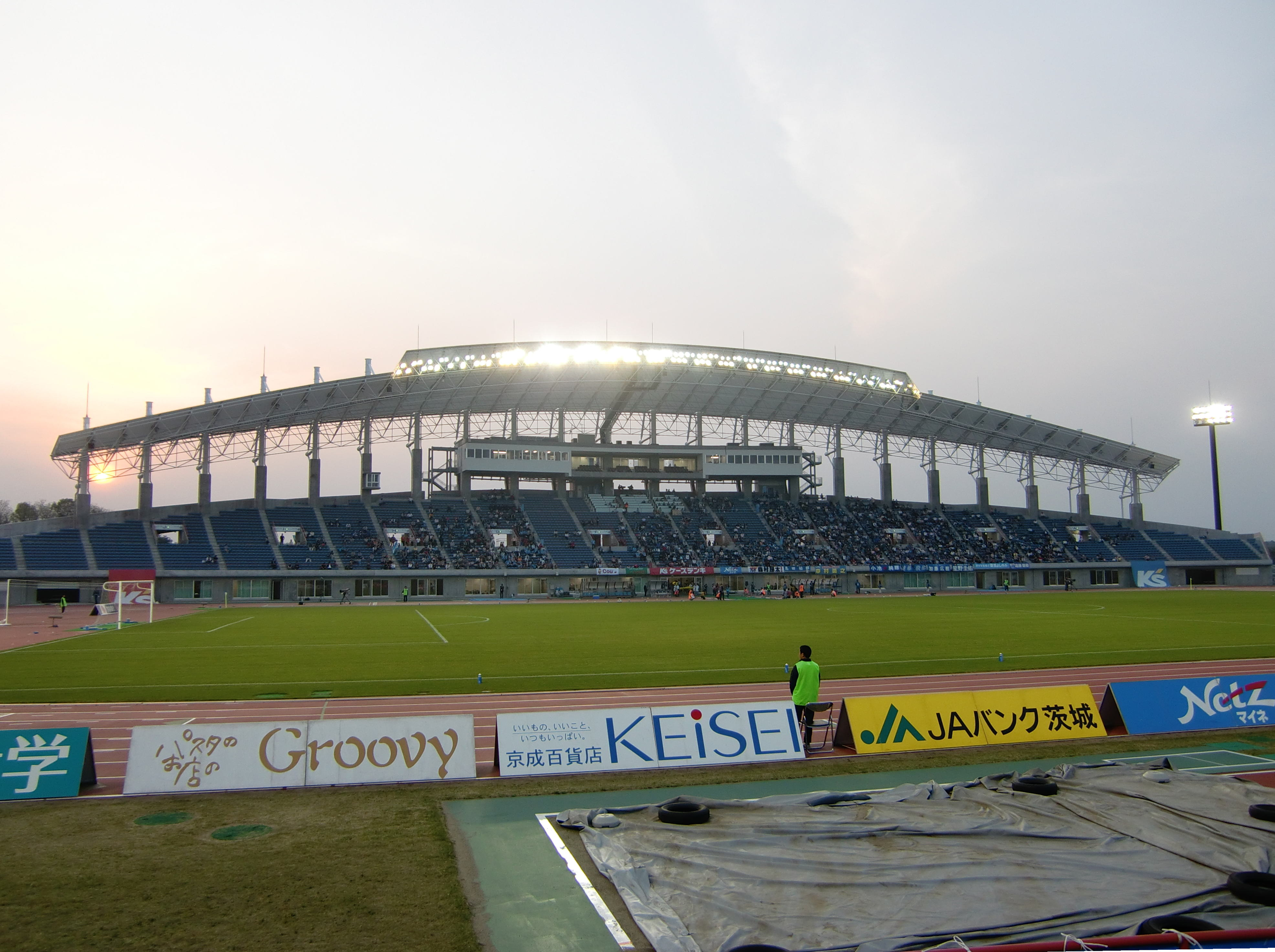

- Japan Ibaraki Prefecture
- Interactive map of K's denki Stadium Mito
- Former names: Mito Stadium (1987-2009)
- Location: Mito, Ibaraki, Japan
- Coordinates: 36.345278°N 140.412222°E
- Owner: Mito City
- Operator: Mito city Association for the Advancement of Sport
- Capacity: 10,152
- Scoreboard: Panasonic Astro Vision
- Field size: 105 m x 68 m

Construction
- Opened: 1987
- Renovated: 2009

Tenant
- Mito HollyHock

K's denki Stadium Mito (ケーズデンキスタジアム水戸) is a multi-purpose stadium in Mito, Japan. It is currently used mostly for football matches. It served as the main home ground of Mito HollyHock from 2010 to 2026. The stadium holds 12,000 people and was rebuilt in 2009.

It was formerly known as Mito Stadium. Since August 2009 it has been called K's denki Stadium Mito for the naming rights.

It was heavily damaged by the major earthquake hitting Eastern Japan in 2011, making more than half the stadium unusable for months afterward.
