= 2012 Roasso Kumamoto season =

Roasso Kumamoto
2012 season
- Manager: Takuya Takagi
- J.League Division 2: 14th
- Emperor's Cup: Fourth round
Home colours	Away colours

The 2012 Roasso Kumamoto season saw Roasso Kumamoto compete in J.League Division 2 for the fifth consecutive season, where they finished 14th. Roasso Kumamoto also competed in the 2012 Emperor's Cup, where they were eliminated in the fourth round.

== Competitions ==
=== J. League ===
==== League table ====
Pos	Team	Pld	W	D	L	GF	GA	GD	Pts
12	Matsumoto Yamaga	42	15	14	13	46	43	+3	59
13	Mito HollyHock	42	15	11	16	47	49	−2	56
14	Roasso Kumamoto	42	15	10	17	40	48	−8	55
15	Tokushima Vortis	42	13	12	17	45	49	−4	51
16	Ehime FC	42	12	14	16	47	46	+1	50

Updated to match(es) played on 11 November 2012. Source: J.League Division 2
Rules for classification: 1st points; 2nd goal differential; 3rd goals scored; 4th head-to-head results; 5th disciplinary points; 6th draw. If two clubs are tied for first place, both clubs will be declared champions.

==== Matches ====
4 March 2012 1	Avispa Fukuoka	2–1	Roasso Kumamoto	LEVEL-5 Stadium
Sunday 15:05	Sakata 21'; Jogo 25'	Report	56' Taketomi	Attendance: 7,379; Referee: Onishi

11 March 2012 2	Roasso Kumamoto	2–1	Gainare Tottori	Kumamoto Athletics Stadium
Sunday 16:04	Taketomi 46'; Fujimoto 52'	Report	10' Koide	Attendance: 5,817; Referee: Noda

17 March 2012 3	Kyoto Sanga	2–0	Roasso Kumamoto	Kyoto Nishikyogoku Athletic Stadium
Saturday 13:04	Miyayoshi 32'; Nakayama 60'	Report		Attendance: 2,901; Referee: Tsukada

20 March 2012 4	Machida Zelvia	1–0	Roasso Kumamoto	Machida Stadium
Tuesday 13:04	Kitai 59'	Report		Attendance: 4,351; Referee: Mikami

25 March 2012 5	Roasso Kumamoto	3–3	Shonan Bellmare	Kumamoto Athletics Stadium
Sunday 16:04	Hiroi 12'; Osako 34'; Taketomi 87'	Report	23' Baba; 55' Furuhashi; 79' Otsuki	Attendance: 4,687; Referee: Fukushima

1 April 2012 6	Roasso Kumamoto	3–0	F.C. Gifu	Kumamoto Athletics Stadium
14:00 (UTC+09)	Choi Kun-Sik 33' (yellow card) 45+4'; Goryo 47', 54'; Yabu (yellow card) 54'	Report	Hiroki Higuchi (yellow card) 51'	Attendance: 3,930; Referee: (Japan) Naohito Ogawa

8 April 2012 7	Tochigi S.C.	2–0	Roasso Kumamoto	Tochigi Green Stadium
14:00 (UTC+09)	Natsume 15'; Sabia (yellow card) 74'; Toma 83'	Report	Katayama (yellow card) 22'; Choi Kun-Sik (red card) 27'	Attendance: 2,999; Referee: (Japan) Haruki Hidaka

15 April 2012 8	Roasso Kumamoto	0–3	Matsumoto Yamaga	Kumamoto Athletics Stadium
14:00 (UTC+09)	Yoshii (yellow card) 38'	Report	Iida (yellow card) 12'; Shiozawa 39'; Tetsuto 72'; Atsuto Tatara 76'	Attendance: 5,472; Referee: (Japan) Yuki Noda

22 April 2012 9	Ehime	0–0	Roasso Kumamoto	Ningineer Stadium
14:00 (UTC+09)	Tomić (yellow card) 32'; Sekine (yellow card) 80'	Report	Katayama (yellow card) 36'; Yoshii (yellow card) 36'; Takahashi (yellow card) 85'; Fukuo (yellow card) 90+1'	Attendance: 1,950; Referee: (Japan) Masuya Ueda

27 April 2012 10	Roasso Kumamoto	0–0	Fagiano Okayama	Kumamoto Athletics Stadium
20:00 (UTC+09)	Saito (yellow card) 71'	Report	Ueda (yellow card) 37'	Attendance: 3,198; Referee: (Japan) Toshimitsu Yoshida

30 April 2012 11	Oita Trinita	0–0	Roasso Kumamoto	Ōita Bank Dome
14:00 (UTC+09)	Morishima (yellow card) 35'; Lee Dong-Myung (yellow card) 42'	Report	Hiroi (yellow card) 11'; Choi Kun-Sik (yellow card) 28'	Attendance: 12,595; Referee: (Japan) Itaru Hirose

3 May 2012 12	Roasso Kumamoto	0–2	Tokyo Verdy	Kumamoto Athletics Stadium
14:00 (UTC+09)	Katayama (yellow card) 27' (yellow-red card) 85'; Goryo (yellow card) 54'; Yoshii (yellow card) 65'; Shiratani (yellow card) 90'; Choi Kun-Sik (yellow card) 90+2'	Report	Fukatsu (yellow card) 24'; Iio 56'; Nakatani (yellow card) 76'; Kobayashi 90+4'	Attendance: 5,775; Referee: (Japan) Hiromichi Oka

6 May 2012 13	Tokushima Vortis	1–1	Roasso Kumamoto	Pocarisweat Stadium
14:00 (UTC+09)	Elizeu (yellow card) 77'; Tsuda 80'	Report	Ichimura 55'; Yoshii (yellow card) 90+2'	Attendance: 4,027; Referee: (Japan) Koichiro Fukushima

13 May 2012 14	Roasso Kumamoto	0–0	Ventforet Kofu	Kumamoto Athletics Stadium
17:00 (UTC+09)	Harada (yellow card) 26' (yellow-red card) 72'; Fukuo (yellow card) 42'; Saito (yellow card) 62'	Report	Izawa (yellow card) 90'; Matsuhashi (yellow card) 90+1'; Takasaki (yellow card) 90+4'; Douglas Santos (yellow card) 90+4'	Attendance: 4,128; Referee: (Japan) Tetsuro Yoshida

20 May 2012 15	JEF United Ichihara Chiba	4–0	Roasso Kumamoto	Fukuda Denshi Arena
17:00 (UTC+09)	Sato (yellow card) 4'; Fujita 10'; Ito 19'; Tanaka 20', 48'; Okamoto (yellow card) 90+5'	Report	Tsuyuki (yellow card) 80'; Yoshii (yellow card) 84'	Attendance: 10,584; Referee: (Japan) Akihiko Ikeuchi

27 May 2012 16	Roasso Kumamoto	2–1	Montedio Yamagata	Kumamoto Athletics Stadium
17:00 (UTC+09)	Taketomi 13', 45+1'; Iwamura (yellow card) 23'; Harada (yellow card) 62'	[uk.soccerway.com/matches/2012/05/27/japan/j2-league/roasso-kumamoto/montedio-yamagata/1257147/ Report]	Bandai 12'	Attendance: 3,248; Referee: (Japan) Ryuji Sato

2 June 2012 17	Yokohama	2–0	Roasso Kumamoto	Nippatsu Mitsuzawa Stadium
17:00 (UTC+09)	Fujita (yellow card) 29'; Takeoka 44'; Morimoto (yellow card) 75'; Kaio 90+2'	Report	Yabu (yellow card) 32'	Attendance: 5,509; Referee: (Japan) Hiroyuki Onishi

7 June 2012 18	Roasso Kumamoto	2–1	Mito HollyHock	Kumamoto Athletics Stadium
20:00 (UTC+09)	Takahashi 2' (yellow card) 4'; Taketomi 28'; Hiroi (yellow card) 62'; Kurakawa (yellow card) 76'	Report	Okamoto 88'	Attendance: 3,127; Referee: (Japan) Taku Nagaya

13 June 2012 19	Thespa Kusatsu	0–0	Roasso Kumamoto	Shoda Shoyu Stadium Gunma
20:00 (UTC+09)	Mikuriya (yellow card) 67'; Hayashi (yellow card) 78'; Arizono (yellow card) 90+3'	Report	Yoshii (yellow card) 41'; Takahashi (yellow card) 74'; Kurakawa (yellow card) 76'	Attendance: 1,333; Referee: (Japan) Hiroyuki Kimura

17 June 2012 20	Roasso Kumamoto	2–2	Giravanz Kitakyushu	Kumamoto Athletics Stadium
20:00 (UTC+09)	Saito 3' (yellow card) 27'; Taketomi (yellow card) 22' (goal) 79'	Report	Nagano (yellow card) 6'; Hanato 23', 29' (yellow card) 78'; Fuji (yellow card) 90+1'	Attendance: 4,572; Referee: (Japan) Akihiko Ikeuchi

24 June 2012 21	Kataller Toyama	0–2	Roasso Kumamoto	Toyama Athletic Stadium
19:00 (UTC+09)		Report	Saito 2'; Taketomi 37'; Hiroi (yellow card) 52'	Attendance: 3,750; Referee: (Japan) Eiji Kawai

1 July 2012 22	Roasso Kumamoto	1–0	JEF United Ichihara Chiba	Kumamoto Athletics Stadium
20:00 (UTC+09)	Harada (yellow card) 78'; Taketomi 85'	Report	Oiwa (yellow card) 31'; Satō (yellow card) 54'	Attendance: 4,326; Referee: (Japan) Ryoichi Imamura

8 July 2012 23	Gifu	0–2	Roasso Kumamoto	Gifu Nagaragawa Stadium
20:00 (UTC+09)	Hiroki Higuchi (yellow card) 40'	Report	Osako 26'; Taketomi 37'; Tsuyuki (yellow card) 90+3'	Attendance: 4,023; Referee: (Japan) Kazuyuki Hayakawa

15 July 2012 24	Roasso Kumamoto	0–1	Kyoto Sanga	Kumamoto Athletics Stadium
20:00 (UTC+09)	Saito (yellow card) 40'	Report	Someya (yellow card) 22'; Nakayama 81'	Attendance: 7,620

22 July 2012 25	Tokyo Verdy	2–0	Roasso Kumamoto	Ajinomoto Stadium
19:00 (UTC+09)	Maki (yellow card) 20'; Fukatsu 39'; Chugo (red card) 45'; Kobayashi (yellow card) 45+3'; Doi (yellow card) 79'; Takahashi 90'; Kajikawa (yellow card) 90+5'	Report	Kurakawa (yellow card) 53'	Attendance: 4,160; Referee: (Japan) Akihiko Ikeuchi

29 July 2012 26	Roasso Kumamoto	0–3	Tokushima Vortis	Kumamoto Athletics Stadium
20:00 (UTC+09)	Hiroi (yellow card) 35'; Ichimura (yellow card) 79'	Report	Aoyama 29'; Tsuda 36' (pen.); Hamada (yellow card) 80'; Eto 81'	Attendance: 6,940; Referee: (Japan) Ryuji Sato

5 August 2012 27	Fagiano Okayama	2–0	Roasso Kumamoto	Kanko Stadium
20:00 (UTC+09)	Ueda 40' (yellow card) 89'; Hiroaki Kamijo (yellow card) 45+1'; Kim Min-Kyun 70'	Report	Fukuo (yellow card) 34'; Fujimoto (yellow card) 48'; Harada (yellow card) 75'	Attendance: 7,306; Referee: (Japan) Masuya Ueda

12 August 2012 28	Roasso Kumamoto	3–0	Tochigi S.C.	Kumamoto Athletics Stadium
20:00 (UTC+09)	Taketomi 15'; Yano 72'; Katayama 90+6'	Summary	Toma (yellow card) 13'; Paulinho (yellow card) 68'	Attendance: 4,526; Referee: (Japan) Kazuyoshi Enomoto

19 August 2012 29	Matsumoto Yamaga	0–0	Roasso Kumamoto	Matsumotodaira Football Stadium
19:00 (UTC+09)	Tetsuto (yellow card) 77'		Yabu (yellow card) 77'	Attendance: 11,142; Referee: (Japan) Ryoichi Imamura

22 August 2012 30	Roasso Kumamoto	1–1	Thespa Kusatsu	Kumamoto Athletics Stadium
20:00 (UTC+09)	Nejime 35'; Saito (yellow card) 51'; Yano (yellow card) 90+1'	Summary	Nagata (yellow card) 11'; Shohei Yokoyama 77'; Tatsushi Koyanagi (yellow card) 83'	Attendance: 3,809; Referee: (Japan) Hiromichi Oka

26 August 2012 31	Roasso Kumamoto	3–0	Kataller Toyama	Kumamoto Athletics Stadium
20:00 (UTC+09)	Yabu 30'; Katayama 33'; Osako 90+3'	Summary	Sekihara (yellow card) 32'	Attendance: 10,530; Referee: (Japan) Yuki Noda

2 September 2012 32	Giravanz Kitakyushu	2–0	Roasso Kumamoto	Honjō Athletic Stadium
19:00 (UTC+09)	Ikemoto 35'; Killoran (yellow card) 58'; Hanato 79'	Summary	Fujimoto (yellow card) 8'; Hiroi (yellow card) 58'; Yano (yellow card) 90+2'	Attendance: 4,794; Referee: (Japan) Hiroyuki Onishi

14 September 2012 33	Mito HollyHock	2–0	Roasso Kumamoto	K's denki Stadium Mito
20:00	Yuto Suzuki 76'; Frank 87'	Summary		Attendance: 2,321; Referee: (Japan) Hiroyoshi Takayama

17 September 2012 34	Roasso Kumamoto	2–1	Oita Trinita	Kumamoto Athletics Stadium
17:00	Tsuyuki (yellow card) 11'; Yabu (yellow card) 30'; Yoshii 36'; Saito 53'	Summary	Morishima (yellow card) 19'; Nishi 49'	Attendance: 9,645; Referee: (Japan) Takuto Okabe

23 September 2012 35	Roasso Kumamoto	3–1	Avispa Fukuoka	Kumamoto Athletics Stadium
16:00	Takahashi 2'; Kitajima 45+1', 63'; Fujimoto (yellow card) 45+2'	Summary	Osmar Francisco 23'	Attendance: 8,152; Referee: (Japan) Tomoya Maeda

30 September 2012 36	Shonan Bellmare	–	Roasso Kumamoto	Shonan BMW Stadium Hiratsuka
20:00

7 October 2012 37	Montedio Yamagata	–	Roasso Kumamoto	ND Soft Stadium Yamagata
19:00

14 October 2012 38	Roasso Kumamoto	–	Machida Zelvia	Kumamoto Athletics Stadium
19:00

21 October 2012 39	Roasso Kumamoto	–	Yokohama	Kumamoto Athletics Stadium
14:00

28 October 2012 40	Gainare Tottori	–	Roasso Kumamoto	Tottori Bank Bird Stadium
16:00

4 November 2012 41	Ventforet Kofu	–	Roasso Kumamoto	Yamanashi Chuo Bank Stadium
13:00

11 November 2012 42	Roasso Kumamoto	–	Ehime	Kumamoto Athletics Stadium
13:00

=== Emperor's Cup ===
8 September 2012 Second round	Roasso Kumamoto	4–3 (a.e.t.)	F.C. Gifu	Kumamoto
13:00	Taketomi 11', 93'; Nakama 74'; Osako 112'	Report	Higuchi 48', 64'; Danilo 95'	Stadium: Kumamoto Athletics Stadium; Attendance: 1,823; Referee: Haruki Hidaka

10 October 2012 Third round	Vegalta Sendai	1–2 (a.e.t.)	Roasso Kumamoto	Yurtec Stadium Sendai, Sendai
19:00	Watanabe 64'	report	Saito 48'; Yabu 119'	Attendance: 4,269; Referee: Nishimura

15 December 2012 Fourth round	Nagoya Grampus	5–2	Roasso Kumamoto	Mizuho Athletic Stadium, Nagoya
15:00	H. Tanaka 15'; Kanazaki 43'; Ogawa 65'; Nagai 78'; Tamada 85'	Report	Saito 24', 44'	Attendance: 4,125; Referee: Matsuo
