= 2012 Tokushima Vortis season =

Tokushima Vortis
2012 season
- Manager: Naohiko Minobe
- J.League Division 2: 15th
- Emperor's Cup: Third round
Home colours	Away colours

The 2012 Tokushima Vortis season sees Tokushima Vortis compete in J.League Division 2 for the eighth consecutive season. This is their 17th season overall in the second tier. Tokushima Vortis are also competing in the 2012 Emperor's Cup.

== Competitions ==
=== J.League ===
==== League table ====
Pos	Team	Pld	W	D	L	GF	GA	GD	Pts
13	Mito HollyHock	42	15	11	16	47	49	−2	56
14	Roasso Kumamoto	42	15	10	17	40	48	−8	55
15	Tokushima Vortis	42	13	12	17	45	49	−4	51
16	Ehime FC	42	12	14	16	47	46	+1	50
17	Thespa Kusatsu	42	12	11	19	31	45	−14	47

Updated to match(es) played on 11 November 2012. Source: J.League Division 2
Rules for classification: 1st points; 2nd goal differential; 3rd goals scored; 4th head-to-head results; 5th disciplinary points; 6th draw. If two clubs are tied for first place, both clubs will be declared champions.

==== Matches ====
4 March 2012 1	Giravanz Kitakyushu	1–2	Tokushima Vortis	Honjo Stadium
Sunday 17:34	Hanato 70'	Report	64' Kim; 87' Tsuda	Attendance: 3,160; Referee: Ikeuchi

11 March 2012 2	Tokushima Vortis	3–0	FC Gifu	Pocarisweat Stadium
Sunday 13:06	Kim 10'; Tsuda 32'; Elizeu 46'	Report		Attendance: 6,016; Referee: Okabe

17 March 2012 3	Tokushima Vortis	0–1	Tochigi SC	Pocarisweat Stadium
Saturday 13:04		Report	15' Takagi	Attendance: 3,572; Referee: Yamamoto

20 March 2012 4	Thespa Kusatsu	0–0	Tokushima Vortis	Shoda Shoyu Stadium Gumma
Tuesday 13:04		Report		Attendance: 2,903; Referee: Noda

25 March 2012 5	JEF United Chiba	3–0	Tokushima Vortis	Fukuda Denshi Arena
Sunday 16:03	Fukai 16'; Oiwa 31', 85'	Report		Attendance: 8,337; Referee: Iida

1 April 2012 6	Tokushima Vortis	1–2	Fagiano Okayama	Pocarisweat Stadium
17:00 (UTC+09)	Suzuki 21' (pen.) (yellow card) 76' (yellow-red card) 89'; Hamada (yellow card) 44' (yellow-red card) 85'; Hanai (yellow card) 58'; Kim (yellow card) 70'; Saito (yellow card) 90+2'	Report	Nakano (yellow card) 21'; Kawamata (yellow card) 54' (goal) 82'; Kondo (yellow card) 55'; Kim Min-Kyun 75' (yellow card) 76'	Attendance: 5,121; Referee: (Japan) Akihiko Ikeuchi

8 April 2012 7	Tokyo Verdy	2–0	Tokushima Vortis	Ajinomoto Stadium
14:00 (UTC+09)	Sugimoto 61'; Abe (yellow card) 81'; Koike 88'	Report	Kim (yellow card) 90'	Attendance: 3,110; Referee: (Japan) Koichiro Fukushima

15 April 2012 8	Oita Trinita	0–0	Tokushima Vortis	Ōita Bank Dome
17:00 (UTC+09)	Kotegawa (yellow card) 73'	Report	Saito (yellow card) 4'; Miki (yellow card) 31'; Diogo (yellow card) 72'	Attendance: 7,607; Referee: (Japan) Tetsuro Yoshida

22 April 2012 9	Tokushima Vortis	0–4	Avispa Fukuoka	Pocarisweat Stadium
19:00 (UTC+09)		Report	Omata (yellow card) 31'; Jogo 45'; Naruoka 64', 66'; Kihara 80'	Attendance: 2,103; Referee: (Japan) Takuto Okabe

27 April 2012 10	Tokushima Vortis	0–2	Ventforet Kofu	Pocarisweat Stadium
20:00 (UTC+09)		Report	Nagasato 33'; Davi 45+1'; Takasaki (yellow card) 83'	Attendance: 2,710; Referee: (Japan) Masaaki Iemoto

30 April 2012 11	Mito HollyHock	2–1	Tokushima Vortis	K's denki Stadium Mito
14:00 (UTC+09)	Kato 37'; Suzuki (yellow card) 67'; Wako (yellow card) 76'; Nishioka (yellow card) 85' (goal) 89'; Homma (yellow card) 87'; Ichikawa (yellow card) 90+1'	Report	Eto (yellow card) 34'; Nishijima (yellow card) 36'; Tokushige 90+2'; Miki (yellow card) 90+5'	Attendance: 4,222; Referee: (Japan) Jumpei Iida

3 May 2012 12	Tokushima Vortis	1–0	Matsumoto Yamaga	Pocarisweat Stadium
16:00 (UTC+09)	Elizeu 71'	Report		Attendance: 5,272; Referee: (Japan) Yuichi Nishimura

6 May 2012 13	Tokushima Vortis	1–1	Roasso Kumamoto	Pocarisweat Stadium
14:00 (UTC+09)	Elizeu (yellow card) 77'; Tsuda 80'	Report	Ichimura 55'; Yoshii (yellow card) 90+2'	Attendance: 4,027; Referee: (Japan) Koichiro Fukushima

13 May 2012 14	Kyoto Sanga	2–1	Tokushima Vortis	Nishikyogoku Athletic Stadium
16:00 (UTC+09)	Nakamura 56'; Akimoto 71'	Report	Miyazaki (yellow card) 58'; Douglas 77'	Attendance: 5,881; Referee: (Japan) Toshimitsu Yoshida

20 May 2012 15	Tokushima Vortis	3–0	Gainare Tottori	Pocarisweat Stadium
14:00 (UTC+09)	Nasukawa (yellow card) 5'; Uesato (yellow card) 11'; Hanai 38'; Tsuda 61'; Douglas 87' (pen.)	Report	Nagira (yellow card) 23'; Kato (yellow card) 55'; Togawa (yellow card) 85'	Attendance: 3,933; Referee: (Japan) Yoshiro Imamura

27 May 2012 16	Shonan Bellmare	0–0	Tokushima Vortis	Shonan BMW Stadium Hiratsuka
16:00 (UTC+09)	Ono (yellow card) 55' (yellow-red card) 59'; Abe (yellow card) 65'	Report		Attendance: 5,862; Referee: (Japan) Hiroyuki Kimura

1 June 2012 17	Tokushima Vortis	1–0	Machida Zelvia	Pocarisweat Stadium
20:00 (UTC+09)	Uesato (yellow card) 66'; Eto (yellow card) 73' (goal) 81'	Report	Marshall (yellow card) 22'	Attendance: 2,960; Referee: (Japan) Akihiko Ikeuchi

9 June 2012 18	Tokushima Vortis	1–2	Yokohama	Pocarisweat Stadium
16:00 (UTC+09)	Miyazaki 10'; Tsuda (yellow card) 25'	Report	Fujita 21' (pen.); Kaio 80'	Attendance: 4,858; Referee: (Japan) Kazuyuki Hayakawa

13 June 2012 19	Kataller Toyama	0–1	Tokushima Vortis	Toyama Athletic Stadium
20:00 (UTC+09)	Nishino (yellow card) 41'	Report	Eto 57'	Attendance: 2,344; Referee: (Japan) Yuki Noda

17 June 2012 20	Tokushima Vortis	3–0	Ehime	Pocarisweat Stadium
19:30 (UTC+09)	Tsuda 20' (yellow card) 59'; Miyazaki 31'; Eto 72'	Report		Attendance: 7,526; Referee: (Japan) Toshimitsu Yoshida

24 June 2012 21	Montedio Yamagata	1–0	Tokushima Vortis	ND Soft Stadium Yamagata
20:00 (UTC+09)	Bandai (yellow card) 44'; Nishikawa (yellow card) 53'; Kobayashi 58'	Report		Attendance: 9,628; Referee: (Japan) Minoru Tojo

1 July 2012 22	Tokushima Vortis	0–0	Thespa Kusatsu	Pocarisweat Stadium
19:30 (UTC+09)		Report	Matsushita (yellow card) 50'	Attendance: 4,132; Referee: (Japan) Akihiko Ikeuchi

8 July 2012 23	Avispa Fukuoka	1–3	Tokushima Vortis	Level-5 Stadium
19:00 (UTC+09)	Sakata 35' (pen.); Kobara (yellow card) 73'	Report	Hashiuchi 15'; Douglas (yellow card) 16' (goal) 71'; Nishijima (yellow card) 34'; Diogo 52'; Oh Seung-Hoon (yellow card) 55'; Nasukawa (yellow card) 88'	Attendance: 5,061; Referee: (Japan) Kenji Ogiya

15 July 2012 24	Fagiano Okayama	0–0	Tokushima Vortis	Kanko Stadium
20:00 (UTC+09)	Tiago (yellow card) 28'; Ueda (yellow card) 63'	Report		Attendance: 9,457

22 July 2012 25	Tokushima Vortis	1–1	Giravanz Kitakyushu	Pocarisweat Stadium
19:30 (UTC+09)	Diogo 85'	Report	Hanato 53'; Miyamoto (yellow card) 90'	Attendance: 5,021; Referee: (Japan) Masuya Ueda

29 July 2012 26	Roasso Kumamoto	0–3	Tokushima Vortis	Suizenji Stadium
20:00 (UTC+09)	Hiroi (yellow card) 35'; Ichimura (yellow card) 79'	Report	Aoyama 29'; Tsuda 36' (pen.); Hamada (yellow card) 80'; Eto 81'	Attendance: 6,940; Referee: (Japan) Ryuji Sato

5 August 2012 27	Tokushima Vortis	0–4	Oita Trinita	Pocarisweat Stadium
19:30 (UTC+09)	Aoyama (red card) 19'; Diogo (yellow card) 37'	Summary	Murai 3', 73'; Yu Yasukawa (yellow card) 16'; Nishi 62'; Mitsuhira 69'	Attendance: 4,101; Referee: (Japan) Takuto Okabe

12 August 2012 28	Ehime	1–2	Tokushima Vortis	Ningineer Stadium
20:00 (UTC+09)	Arita 67' (pen.)	Summary	Tsuda 40'; Hamada (yellow card) 65'; Hashiuchi 72'; Uesato (yellow card) 88'	Attendance: 6,612; Referee: (Japan) Akihiko Ikeuchi

19 August 2012 29	Machida Zelvia	1–0	Tokushima Vortis	Machida Athletic Stadium
19:00 (UTC+09)	Suzuki 37'; Tashiro (yellow card) 63'; Ota (yellow card) 65'; Tomohito Shugyo (yellow card) 80'; Marshall (yellow card) 86'	Summary	Hashiuchi (yellow card) 89'	Attendance: 2,853; Referee: (Japan) Eiji Kawai

22 August 2012 30	Tokushima Vortis	0–0	Shonan Bellmare	Pocarisweat Stadium
20:00 (UTC+09)	Hamada (yellow card) 13'; Fukumoto (yellow card) 90+1'	Summary	Kamata (yellow card) 80'	Attendance: 3,158; Referee: (Japan) Yuki Noda

26 August 2012 31	Gainare Tottori	0–3	Tokushima Vortis	Tottori Bank Bird Stadium
19:00 (UTC+09)	Mori (yellow card) 21'; Mio (yellow card) 35'	Summary	Hirajima (yellow card) 12'; Aoyama (yellow card) 15'; Nishijima 45', 90+3'; Diogo 87'; Miyazaki (yellow card) 89'	Attendance: 2,842; Referee: (Japan) Hiromichi Oka

2 September 2012 32	Tokushima Vortis	2–2	Montedio Yamagata	Pocarisweat Stadium
19:30 (UTC+09)	Tsuda 21'; Eto 32'; Kim (red card) 84'	Summary	Branquinho (yellow card) 68' (goal) 85' (pen.); Hirose 75'	Attendance: 4,207; Referee: (Japan) Ryoichi Imamura

14 September 2012 33	Tochigi SC	1–1	Tokushima Vortis	Tochigi Green Stadium
20:00	Sugimoto 65'; Usami (yellow card) 86'	Summary	Nishijima (yellow card) 25'; Eto 47'; Fukimoto (yellow card) 71'	Attendance: 2,633; Referee: (Japan) Kazuyuki Hayakawa

17 September 2012 34	Tokushima Vortis	1–2	Mito HollyHock	Pocarisweat Stadium
19:30	Hamada 17'; Douglas (yellow card) 49'	Summary	Dai (yellow card) 4'; Okamoto 27'; Yoshihara 82'	Attendance: 1,933; Referee: (Japan) Haruki Hidaka

23 September 2012 35	Yokohama	1–0	Tokushima Vortis	Nippatsu Mitsuzawa Stadium
15:00	Kaio 41'; Horinouchi (yellow card) 42'	Summary	Fukumoto (yellow card) 77'; Nasukawa (yellow card) 86'	Attendance: 5,173; Referee: (Japan) Taku Nagaya

7 October 2012 37	Ventforet Kofu	3–2	Tokushima Vortis	Yamanashi Chuo Bank Stadium
15:00	Nagasato 32'; Fernandinho 39'; Davi 50'	Summary	Alex Santos (yellow card) 61' (goal) 88', 90'; Miki (yellow card) 75'; Hashiuchi (red card) 85'; Douglas (yellow card) 90' (yellow-red card) 90+3'	Attendance: 10,741; Referee: (Japan) Eiji Kawai

14 October 2012 38	Matsumoto Yamaga	1–1	Tokushima Vortis	Matsumotodaira Football Stadium
17:00	Iio 22'; Tamabayashi (yellow card) 30'	Summary	Hamada (yellow card) 13'; Alex Santos 54'	Attendance: 9,361; Referee: (Japan) Akihiko Ikeuchi

21 October 2012 39	Tokushima Vortis	3–0	Kataller Toyama	Pocarisweat Stadium
19:00	Nasukawa 22'; Alex Santos 63'; Kim 90+2'	Summary	Kato (yellow card) 53'; Asahi (yellow card) 89'	Attendance: 3,173; Referee: (Japan) Tetsuro Yoshida

25 October 2012 36	Tokushima Vortis	2–4	Kyoto Sanga	Pocarisweat Stadium
20:00	Fukumoto (yellow card) 39'; Douglas 67'; Hashiuchi 84'	Summary	Jung Woo-Young 11'; Nakamura 29' (pen.), 63'; Bajalica 73'	Attendance: 2,372; Referee: (Japan) Kazuyoshi Enomoto

28 October 2012 40	Tokushima Vortis	2–1	Tokyo Verdy	Pocarisweat Stadium
15:00	Kota Fukatsu 14' (o.g.); Tsuda 38'; Nishijima (yellow card) 90+1'	Summary	Kota Fukatsu 66'; Mori (yellow card) 76'	Attendance: 4,152; Referee: (Japan) Tomohiro Inoue

4 November 2012 41	Gifu	0–0	Tokushima Vortis	Gifu Nagaragawa Stadium
15:00	Nogaito (yellow card) 45'	Summary	Suzuki (yellow card) 31'; Diogo (yellow card) 65'; Hamada (yellow card) 72'	Attendance: 11,119; Referee: (Japan) Hiromichi Oka

11 November 2012 42	Tokushima Vortis	0–3	JEF United Ichihara Chiba	Pocarisweat Stadium
13:00	Hamada (yellow card) 34'; Alex Santos (yellow card) 38'	Summary	Yonekura 25'; Satō 29' (yellow card) 42'; Fujita 57'	Attendance: 3,461; Referee: (Japan) Ryuji Sato

=== Emperor's Cup ===
8 September 2012 Second round	Tokushima Vortis	5–1	Fagiano Okayama Next	Naruto, Tokushima
13:00	Douglas 33'; Tsuda 50'; Hamada 63'; Nasukawa 80'; Ota 90+1'	Report	Nakano 88'	Stadium: Pocarisweat Stadium; Attendance: 948; Referee: Tomohiro Tsukada

10 October 2012 Third round	Kawasaki Frontale	3–2 (a.e.t.)	Tokushima Vortis	Kawasaki, Kanagawa
19:00	Renatinho 26', 120+1'; Kusukami 78'	Report	Alex Santos 24'; Tsuda 90+1'	Stadium: Todoroki Athletics Stadium; Attendance: 3,710; Referee: Yudai Yamamoto
