= 2012 Tokyo Verdy season =

Tokyo Verdy
2012 season
- Manager: Ryoichi Kawakatsu
- J.League Division 2: -
- Emperor's Cup: -
Home colours	Away colours

The 2012 Tokyo Verdy season sees Tokyo Verdy compete in J.League Division 2 for the fourth consecutive season and 12th second-tier season overall since 1972. Tokyo Verdy are also competing in the 2012 Emperor's Cup.

== Competitions ==
=== J. League ===
==== League table ====
Pos	Team	Pld	W	D	L	GF	GA	GD	Pts	Promotion or relegation
5	JEF United Chiba	42	21	9	12	61	33	+28	72	Qualification for promotion playoffs
6	Oita Trinita (O, P)	42	21	8	13	59	40	+19	71	Qualification for promotion playoffs
7	Tokyo Verdy	42	20	6	16	65	46	+19	66	
8	Fagiano Okayama	42	17	14	11	41	34	+7	65	
9	Giravanz Kitakyushu	42	19	7	16	53	47	+6	64	

Updated to match(es) played on 11 November 2012. Source: J.League Division 2
Rules for classification: 1st points; 2nd goal differential; 3rd goals scored; 4th head-to-head results; 5th disciplinary points; 6th draw. If two clubs are tied for first place, both clubs will be declared champions.
(O) Play-off winners; (P) Promoted

==== Matches ====
4 March 2012 1	Tokyo Verdy	2 – 0	Matsumoto Yamaga	Tokyo
13:05 JST	Kobayashi 51'; Josimar 58'	(Report)	(yellow card) 14' Watanabe	Stadium: Ajinomoto Stadium; Attendance: 12,432; Referee: (Japan) Koichiro Fukushima

11 March 2012 2	Tokyo Verdy	1 – 3	Ventforet Kofu	Tokyo
16:05 JST	Kobayashi 14'; Kobayashi (yellow card) 57'; Fukatsu (yellow card) 90+1'	(Report)	17' Davi; 60' Sasaki; 80' Katagiri	Stadium: Ajinomoto Stadium; Attendance: 7,020; Referee: (Japan) Toshimitsu Yoshida

17 March 2012 3	Kataller Toyama	1 – 4	Tokyo Verdy	Toyama
16:06 JST	Kurobe 5'; Kato (yellow card) 58'	(Report)	(yellow card) 3' (yellow-red card) 50' Mori; 10' Abe; 24' Kajikawa; 55' Iio; 78' Koike	Stadium: Toyama Stadium; Attendance: 3,470; Referee: (Japan) Takuto Okabe

20 March 2012 4	Yokohama F.C.	0 – 0	Tokyo Verdy	Kanagawa
19:03 JST	Park (yellow card) 49'; Ōkubo (yellow card) 86'	(Report)	(yellow card) 10' Nishi; (yellow card) 29' Fukatsu; (yellow card) 75' Kajikawa	Stadium: NHK Spring Mitsuzawa Football Stadium; Attendance: 3,549; Referee: (Japan) Tetsuro Yoshida

25 March 2012 5	Tokyo Verdy	2 – 0	Thespa Kusatsu	Tokyo
16:03 JST	Nishi 23'; Abe (yellow card) 64'; Abe 90+4'	(Report)	(yellow card) 32' Nakamura	Stadium: Ajinomoto Stadium; Attendance: 3,008; Referee: (Japan) Yuichi Nishimura

1 April 2012 6	Machida Zelvia	1 – 2	Tokyo Verdy	Machida
16:04 JST	Kitai 65'; Ota (yellow card) 80'	(Report)	(yellow card) 41' Kobayashi; 46' Abe; 77' Sugimoto; (yellow card) 79' Sugimoto	Stadium: Machida Stadium; Attendance: 6,288; Referee: (Japan) Yuki Noda

8 April 2012 7	Tokyo Verdy	2 – 0	Tokushima Vortis	Tokyo
13:03 JST	Sugimoto 61'; Abe (yellow card) 81'; Koike 88'	(Report)	(yellow card) 90' Kim	Stadium: Ajinomoto Stadium; Attendance: 3,110; Referee: (Japan) Koichiro Fukushima

15 April 2012 8	Kyoto Sanga	1 – 0	Tokyo Verdy	Kyoto
14:05 JST	Nagasawa (yellow card) 24'; Jung (yellow card) 35'; Hara 81'	(Report)	(yellow card) 23' Nishi	Stadium: Kyoto Nishikyogoku Athletic Stadium; Attendance: 8,741; Referee: (Japan) Kazuyoshi Enomoto

22 April 2012 9	Tokyo Verdy	1 – 2	Shonan Bellmare	Tokyo
14:33 JST	Tsuchiya (yellow card) 17'; Wada (yellow card) 24'; Takahashi (yellow card) 38'; Fukatsu (yellow card) 59'; Mori (yellow card) 71'; Abe 87'	(Report)	(yellow card) 26' Furuhashi; (yellow card) 41' Nagaki; 70' Endo; 71' Shimamura; (yellow card) 90+2' Endo	Stadium: Komazawa Olympic Park Stadium; Attendance: 6,544; Referee: (Japan) Hiroyuki Kimura

27 April 2012 10	Avispa Fukuoka	1 – 3	Tokyo Verdy	Fukuoka
19:03 JST	Sakata 64'	(Report)	22' Abe; 53', 85', (yellow card) 90+7' Takahashi; (yellow card) 69' Mori; (yellow card) 90+1' Maki	Stadium: LEVEL-5 Stadium; Attendance: 3,262; Referee: (Japan) Nobutsugu Murakami

30 April 2012 11	Tokyo Verdy	0 – 2	Montedio Yamagata	Tokyo
17:04 JST	Kajikawa (yellow card) 23'	(Report)	(yellow card) 18' Miyasaka; (yellow card) 19' Yamazaki; 41' Bandai; 69' Nakashima	Stadium: Ajinomoto Stadium; Attendance: 6,114; Referee: (Japan) Hiroyoshi Takayama

3 May 2012 12	Roasso Kumamoto	0 – 2	Tokyo Verdy	Kumamoto
13:04 JST	Katayama (yellow card) 27' (yellow-red card) 85'; Goryo (yellow card) 54'; Yoshii (yellow card) 65'; Shiratani (yellow card) 90'; Choi (yellow card) 90+2'	(Report)	(yellow card) 24' Fukatsu; 56' Iio; (yellow card) 76' Nakatani; 90+4' Kobayashi	Stadium: Kumamoto Athletics Stadium; Attendance: 5,775; Referee: (Japan) Hiromichi Oka

6 May 2012 13	Mito HollyHock	0 – 2	Tokyo Verdy	Mito
19:04 JST	Suzuki (yellow card) 29'; Kim (yellow card) 40' (yellow-red card) 58'; Kanakubo (yellow card) 64'; Nishioka (yellow card) 66'; Wako (yellow card) 90+5'	(Report)	(yellow card) 36' Iio; 85' Nishi; 88' Kajikawa	Stadium: K's denki Stadium Mito; Attendance: 4,170; Referee: (Japan) Haruki Hidaka

13 May 2012 14	Tokyo Verdy	0 – 1	Fagiano Okayama	Tokyo
13:03 JST	Tsuchiya (yellow card) 65'	(Report)	(yellow card) 17' Sengoku; 81' Sekido	Stadium: Ajinomoto Stadium; Attendance: 3,515; Referee: (Japan) Kazuyoshi Enomoto

20 May 2012 15	Giravanz Kitakyushu	1 – 5	Tokyo Verdy	Kitakyushu
13:03 JST	Takano (yellow card) 17'; Kim (yellow card) 47'; Komorida 52', (yellow card) 58'	(Report)	(yellow card) 5' Fukatsu; 17', 79' Abe; 24' Nishi; 50' Fukatsu; (yellow card) 60' Takahashi; 82' Maki	Stadium: Honjo Stadium; Attendance: 3,491; Referee: (Japan) Masuya Ueda

27 May 2012 16	Tochigi S.C.	3 - 2	Tokyo Verdy	Utsunomiya
16:00 JST	Hirose 24'; Takagi 77' (yellow card) 79'; Onodera 84'	Report	Nishi 27'; Koike 88'	Stadium: Tochigi Green Stadium; Attendance: 4,473; Referee: Masaaki Iemoto

2 June 2012 17	Tokyo Verdy	3 - 1	Oita Trinita	Tokyo
17:00 JST	Sugimoto 10'; Takahashi (yellow card) 15'; Mori (yellow card) 18' (goal) 38'; Iio 48'	Report	Murai (yellow card) 12'; Morishima 16' (pen.) (yellow card) 86'; Ishigami (yellow card) 31'	Stadium: Ajinomoto Stadium; Attendance: 3,670; Referee: Takuto Okabe

9 June 2012 18	Gainare Tottori	0 - 2	Tokyo Verdy	Tottori
19:00 JST		Report	Abe 45', 68' (yellow card) 52'; Tsuchiya (yellow card) 58'	Stadium: Tottori Bank Bird Stadium; Attendance: 3,508; Referee: Yosuke Kubota

13 June 2012 19	Tokyo Verdy	4 - 1	F.C. Gifu	Tokyo
19:00 JST	Nishi 4'; Kobayashi 75' (pen.); Takahashi 82'; Abe 87'	Report	Hiroko Higuchi 12'; Nogaito (yellow card) 85'; Kohei Nakajima (yellow card) 90'	Stadium: National Stadium; Attendance: 3,187; Referee: Akihiro Ikeuchi

17 June 2012 20	Tokyo Verdy	2 - 1	JEF United Chiba	Tokyo
18:00 JST	Sugimoto 12'; Kajikawa (yellow card) 23'; Tsuchiya (yellow card) 45'; Abe 72'	Report	Sato (yellow card) 28'; Aarøy 88'	Stadium: Ajinomoto Stadium; Attendance: 6,933; Referee: Antonio Arias

24 June 2012 21	Ehime F.C.	3 - 1	Tokyo Verdy	Matsuyama
19:00 JST	Oyama 37'; Alair 51'; Urata (yellow card) 65'; Azuma 80'	Report	Fukatsu (yellow card) 18' (yellow-red card) 76'; Abe 32'	Stadium: Ningineer Stadium; Attendance: 3,653; Referee: (Japan) Taku Nagaya

1 July 2012 22	Tokyo Verdy	2 - 0	Mito HollyHock	Tokyo
18:00 JST	Abe 11', 31'	Report	Suzuki (yellow card) 23'	Stadium: Ajinomoto Stadium; Attendance: 3,128; Referee: (Japan) Hiroyoshi Takayama

8 July 2012 23	Matsumoto Yamaga	3 - 2	Tokyo Verdy	Matsumoto
19:00 JST	Tsurumaki 38' (yellow card) 42'; Mutsumi Tamabayashi 81'; Shiozawa 85'	Report	Mori 68'; Chugo 90'	Stadium: Matsumoto Stadium; Attendance: 10,092; Referee: (Japan) Takuto Okabe

15 July 2012 24	Tokyo Verdy	1 - 0	Gainare Tottori	Tokyo
19:00 JST	Mori (yellow card) 26'; Sugimoto 66'	Report		Stadium: Ajinomoto Stadium; Attendance: 4,151; Referee: (Japan) Tomohiro Tsukada

22 July 2012 25	Tokyo Verdy	2 - 0	Roasso Kumamoto	Tokyo
19:00 JST	Maki (yellow card) 20'; Fukatsu 39'; Chugo (red card) 45'; Kobayashi (yellow card) 45+3'; Doi (yellow card) 79'; Takahashi 90'; Kajikawa (yellow card) 90+5'	Report	Kurakawa (yellow card) 53'	Stadium: Ajinomoto Stadium; Attendance: 4,160; Referee: (Japan) Akihiko Ikeuchi

29 July 2012 26	Ventforet Kofu	3 - 1	Tokyo Verdy	Kofu
19:00 JST	Nagasato 1'; Hosaka (yellow card) 40' (yellow-red card) 45+1'; Tsuda (yellow card) 65'; Kashiwa 71'; Ishihara 88' (yellow card) 90+2'	Report	Fukatsu (yellow card) 6' (yellow-red card) 26'; Takahashi 52'; Tone (yellow card) 58'; Abe (yellow card) 72'; Koike (yellow card) 90+5'	Stadium: Yamanashi Chuo Bank Stadium; Attendance: 12,105; Referee: (England) Darren Deadman

5 August 2012 27	Tokyo Verdy	1 - 0	Kataller Toyama	Tokyo
19:00 JST	Iio 23'	Report	Fukuda (yellow card) 57'	Stadium: Ajinomoto Stadium; Attendance: 3,504; Referee: (Japan) Hiroyuki Kimura

12 August 2012 28	Tokyo Verdy	0 - 1	Kyoto Sanga	Tokyo
19:00 JST	Takahashi (yellow card) 16'; Tone (yellow card) 63'	Report	Bajalica (yellow card) 10'; Fukumura (red card) 48'; Mizutani (yellow card) 61'; Nakamura 65'	Stadium: Ajinomoto Stadium; Attendance: 4,824; Referee: (Japan) Toshimitsu Yoshida

19 August 2012 29	Shonan Bellmare	1 - 1	Tokyo Verdy	Hiratsuka
18:30 JST	Kobayashi (yellow card) 39'; Macena 56'	Summary	Iio (yellow card) 50'; Jymmy 76'	Stadium: Hiratsuka Athletics Stadium; Attendance: 9,370; Referee: (Japan) Nobutsugu Murakami

22 August 2012 30	Oita Trinita	2 - 1	Tokyo Verdy	Oita
19:00 JST	Mitsuhira 26'; Choi Jung-Han 80' (yellow card) 81'	Summary	Abe 57'	Stadium: Ōita Bank Dome; Attendance: 7,007; Referee: (Japan) Minoru Tojo

26 August 2012 31	Tokyo Verdy	0 - 2	Giravanz Kitakyushu	Kita
19:00 JST		Summary	Tokiwa 40'; Tada (yellow card) 58'; Hayashi 89'	Stadium: Nishigaoka Soccer Stadium; Attendance: 3,088; Referee: (Japan) Hiroyoshi Takayama

2 September 2012 32	F.C. Gifu	1 - 0	Tokyo Verdy	Gifu
19:00 JST	Danilo Pereira (yellow card) 55' (goal) 67'; Tanaka (yellow card) 62'	Summary		Stadium: Gifu Nagaragawa Stadium; Attendance: 4,849; Referee: (Japan) Yuki Noda

14 September 2012 33	Tokyo Verdy	1 - 1	Avispa Fukuoka	Kita
20:00 JST	Takahashi (yellow card) 22'; Mori (yellow card) 67'; Shoya Nakajima 83'	Summary	Kim Min-Je (yellow card) 8'; Koga 20'; Yamaguchi (yellow card) 29'	Stadium: Nishigaoka Soccer Stadium; Attendance: 2,875; Referee: (Japan) Takuto Okabe

17 September 2012 34	Tokyo Verdy	3 - 0	Ehime F.C.	Tokyo
16:00 JST	Abe 26' (pen.); Nishi 38'; Tsuchiya (yellow card) 42'; Alex Henrique 69'	Summary	Alair (yellow card) 24'; Akimoto (yellow card) 31'	Stadium: Komazawa Olympic Park Stadium; Attendance: 3,893; Referee: (Japan) Koji Morikawa

23 September 2012 35	JEF United Chiba	2 - 2	Tokyo Verdy	Chiba
JST	Yamaguchi (yellow card) 4'; Arata 26' (yellow card) 33'; Oiwa (yellow card) 60'; Ricardo Lobo (yellow card) 70'; Yazawa 86'	Summary	Takahashi (yellow card) 11'; Chugo 43'; Alex (yellow card) 65'; Abe 90+3'	Stadium: Fukuda Denshi Arena; Attendance: 8,514; Referee: (Japan) Futoshi Nakamura

30 September 2012 36	Montedio Yamagata	1 - 1	Tokyo Verdy	Yamagata
17:00 JST	Akiba 77'; Hirose (yellow card) 90+5'	Summary	Tsuchiya 90+5'	Stadium: NDsoft Stadium Yamagata; Attendance: 6,945; Referee: (Japan) Toshimitsu Yoshida

7 October 2012 37	Tokyo Verdy	1 - 1	Machida Zelvia	Tokyo
17:00 JST	Kajikawa 50'; Mori (yellow card) 70'; Tsuchiya (yellow card) 83'; Chugo (yellow card) 84'	Summary	Dimić 85' (pen.)	Stadium: Ajinomoto Stadium; Attendance: 8,645; Referee: (Japan) Nobutsugu Murakami

14 October 2012 38	Fagiano Okayama	2 - 0	Tokyo Verdy	Okayama
14:00 JST	Kim Min-Kyun (yellow card) 3' (yellow-red card) 48'; Kawamata 17'; Tadokoro 90+3'	Summary	Alex Henrique (yellow card) 52'; Kijima (yellow card) 72'; Shibasaki (yellow card) 85'	Stadium: Kanko Stadium; Attendance: 8,798; Referee: (Japan) Yosuke Kubota

21 October 2012 39	Tokyo Verdy	4 - 1	Tochigi S.C.	Tokyo
JST	Shoya Nakajima 16', 58', 62'; Kajikawa (yellow card) 40'; Nishi (yellow card) 51'; Tone (yellow card) 82'; Abe 90+1'	Summary	Sabia 46'	Stadium: Ajinomoto Stadium; Attendance: 5,264; Referee: (Japan) Hajime Matsuo

28 October 2012 40	Tokushima Vortis	2 - 1	Tokyo Verdy	Naruto
JST	Tsuda 38', 90'; Nishijima (yellow card) 90'	Summary	Fukatsu 66'; Mori (yellow card) 76'	Stadium: Pocarisweat Stadium; Attendance: 4,152; Referee: (Japan) Tomohiro Inoue

4 November 2012 41	Tokyo Verdy	0 - 1	Yokohama F.C.	Tokyo
16:00 JST		Summary	Nozaki (yellow card) 25'; Bae Seung-Jin (yellow card) 57'; Tahara 78'	Stadium: Ajinomoto Stadium; Attendance: 13,093; Referee: (Japan) Masuya Ueda

11 November 2012 42	Thespa Kusatsu	0 - 1	Tokyo Verdy	Maebashi
13:00 JST	Alex Rafael (yellow card) 90+5'	Summary	Takahashi 1'	Stadium: Shoda Stadium; Attendance: 5,765; Referee: (Japan) Tetsuro Yoshida

=== Emperor's Cup ===
8 September 2012 Round 2	Tokyo Verdy	3 - 0	Hoyo Oita	Kita, Tokyo
13:00	Kajikawa 18'; Iio 32'; França 90+4'	Report		Stadium: Nishigaoka Soccer Stadium; Attendance: 1,093; Referee: Kazuyuki Hayakawa

10 October 2012 Round 3	Shimizu S-Pulse	1 - 0	Tokyo Verdy	Shizuoka City
19:00	Shirasaki 54'	Report		Stadium: Outsourcing Stadium Nihondaira; Attendance: 3,223; Referee: Ryuji Sato
