= 2010 Roasso Kumamoto season =

Roasso Kumamoto
2010 season
- Manager: Takuya Takagi
- Stadium: Kumamoto Athletics Stadium
- J. League 2: 7th
- Emperor's Cup: 3rd Round
- Top goalscorer: Shota Matsuhashi (7)

2010 Roasso Kumamoto season

== Competitions ==
| Competitions | Position |
|---|---|
| J. League 2 | 7th / 19 clubs |
| Emperor's Cup | 3rd Round |

== Player statistics ==
| No. | Pos. | Player | D.o.B. (Age) | Height / Weight | J. League 2 | | Emperor's Cup | | Total | |
| No. | Pos. | Player | D.o.B. (Age) | Height / Weight | Apps | Goals | Apps | Goals | Apps | Goals |
|---|---|---|---|---|---|---|---|---|---|---|
| 1 | GK | Masaki Kinoshita | June 22, 1989 (aged 20) | cm / kg | 0 | 0 | | | | |
| 2 | DF | Cho Song-Jin | December 14, 1990 (aged 19) | cm / kg | 8 | 0 | | | | |
| 4 | DF | Kunihiro Yamashita | May 29, 1986 (aged 23) | cm / kg | 1 | 0 | | | | |
| 5 | MF | Kenta Kato | June 19, 1987 (aged 22) | cm / kg | 0 | 0 | | | | |
| 6 | DF | Tadayo Fukuo | May 6, 1984 (aged 25) | cm / kg | 33 | 1 | | | | |
| 7 | MF | Yasunobu Matsuoka | May 2, 1986 (aged 23) | cm / kg | 0 | 0 | | | | |
| 8 | MF | Taku Harada | October 27, 1982 (aged 27) | cm / kg | 27 | 0 | | | | |
| 9 | FW | Kazuya Okamura | December 15, 1987 (aged 22) | cm / kg | 0 | 0 | | | | |
| 10 | FW | Shota Matsuhashi | August 3, 1982 (aged 27) | cm / kg | 33 | 7 | | | | |
| 11 | FW | Jun Uruno | October 23, 1979 (aged 30) | cm / kg | 31 | 4 | | | | |
| 13 | MF | Nozomi Osako | November 27, 1990 (aged 19) | cm / kg | 4 | 0 | | | | |
| 14 | FW | Shotaro Ihata | February 12, 1987 (aged 23) | cm / kg | 16 | 2 | | | | |
| 15 | DF | Atsushi Ichimura | November 18, 1984 (aged 25) | cm / kg | 17 | 2 | | | | |
| 16 | DF | Daisuke Yano | October 26, 1984 (aged 25) | cm / kg | 32 | 2 | | | | |
| 17 | FW | Yuichi Yamauchi | October 26, 1984 (aged 25) | cm / kg | 9 | 0 | | | | |
| 18 | GK | Yuta Minami | September 30, 1979 (aged 30) | cm / kg | 36 | 0 | | | | |
| 19 | DF | Shunsuke Tsutsumi | June 8, 1987 (aged 22) | cm / kg | 18 | 0 | | | | |
| 20 | FW | Takuya Sasagaki | June 1, 1991 (aged 18) | cm / kg | 0 | 0 | | | | |
| 21 | GK | Koji Inada | June 19, 1985 (aged 24) | cm / kg | 0 | 0 | | | | |
| 22 | MF | Kosuke Yoshii | March 19, 1986 (aged 23) | cm / kg | 35 | 0 | | | | |
| 23 | MF | Hironori Nishi | February 25, 1987 (aged 23) | cm / kg | 35 | 4 | | | | |
| 24 | DF | Kazuto Tsuyuki | August 14, 1984 (aged 25) | cm / kg | 34 | 1 | | | | |
| 25 | MF | Masaaki Nishimori | March 12, 1985 (aged 24) | cm / kg | 19 | 0 | | | | |
| 26 | MF | Yoshiki Hiraki | October 17, 1986 (aged 23) | cm / kg | 11 | 1 | | | | |
| 27 | MF | Fabio | August 27, 1990 (aged 19) | cm / kg | 20 | 5 | | | | |
| 28 | MF | Toshiya Fujita | October 4, 1971 (aged 38) | cm / kg | 25 | 2 | | | | |
| 29 | FW | Thales | February 20, 1989 (aged 21) | cm / kg | 0 | 0 | | | | |
| 30 | MF | Takumi Watanabe | March 15, 1982 (aged 27) | cm / kg | 25 | 0 | | | | |
| 31 | GK | Tengo Miura | April 17, 1991 (aged 18) | cm / kg | 0 | 0 | | | | |
| 32 | FW | Robert Cullen | June 7, 1985 (aged 24) | cm / kg | 18 | 3 | | | | |
| 33 | DF | Shosuke Katayama | September 8, 1983 (aged 26) | cm / kg | 15 | 3 | | | | |

== Other pages ==
- (in Japanese) J. League official site
