= Kazuki Saito =

Kazuki Saito may refer to:

- Kazuki Saito (footballer, born 1988) (齊藤 和樹), Japanese footballer
- Kazuki Saito (footballer, born 1996) (齋藤 和希), Japanese footballer
