= Masahiro Nasukawa =

Japanese footballer

Masahiro Nasukawa 那須川将大
Personal information
- Full name: Masahiro Nasukawa
- Date of birth: December 29, 1986 (age 39)
- Place of birth: Noboribetsu, Hokkaido, Japan
- Height: 1.76 m (5 ft 9 1/2 in)
- Position: Left back

Team information
- Current team: Fujieda MYFC
- Number: 24

Youth career
- 2002–2004: Aomori Yamada High School
- 2005–2008: Chukyo University

Senior career*
Years	Team	Apps	(Gls)
2009	Tokyo Verdy	23	(0)
2010–2011	Tochigi SC	41	(4)
2012–2014	Tokushima Vortis	73	(2)
2015–2017	Matsumoto Yamaga	28	(1)
2018	Oita Trinita	8	(1)
2019	Matsumoto Yamaga	0	(0)
2019–	Fujieda MYFC	6	(0)
- * Club domestic league appearances and goals as of 7 January 2019

Masahiro Nasukawa (那須川 将大, Nasukawa Masahiro; born December 29, 1986 in Hokkaido) is a Japanese football player who currently plays for Fujieda MYFC.

== Career statistics ==
Updated to 24 February 2019.

Club performance			League		Cup		League Cup		Other		Total	
Season	Club	League	Apps	Goals	Apps	Goals	Apps	Goals	Apps	Goals	Apps	Goals
Japan			League		Emperor's Cup		League Cup		Other^{1}		Total	
2009	Tokyo Verdy	J2 League	23	0	0	0	-		-		23	0
2010	Tochigi SC	J2 League	14	1	2	0	-		-		16	1
2011	Tochigi SC	J2 League	27	3	1	0	-		-		28	3
2012	Tokushima Vortis	J2 League	36	1	2	1	-		-		38	2
2013	Tokushima Vortis	J2 League	17	1	0	0	-		1	0	17	1
2014	Tokushima Vortis	J1 League	20	0	2	0	4	0	-		26	0
2015	Matsumoto Yamaga	J1 League	2	0	1	0	3	0	-		6	0
2016	Matsumoto Yamaga	J2 League	20	1	0	0	-		0	0	20	1
2017	Matsumoto Yamaga	J2 League	6	0	0	0	-		-		6	0
2018	Oita Trinita	J2 League	8	1	0	0	-		-		8	1
Career total			173	8	8	1	7	0	1	0	188	9

^{1}Includes Promotion Playoffs to J1.
