= Taku Harada =

Japanese footballer

Taku Harada 原田 拓
Personal information
- Full name: Taku Harada
- Date of birth: October 27, 1982 (age 44)
- Place of birth: Kumamoto, Kumamoto, Japan
- Height: 1.79 m (5 ft 10 1/2 in)
- Position: Midfielder

Youth career
- 1998–2000: Ozu High School

Senior career*
Years	Team	Apps	(Gls)
2001–2003	Nagoya Grampus Eight	7	(0)
2004–2005	Oita Trinita	28	(2)
2005–2008	Kawasaki Frontale	36	(1)
2009–2014	Roasso Kumamoto	186	(4)
Total		257	(7)
Medal record
Kawasaki Frontale
Runner-up	J1 League	2006
Runner-up	J1 League	2008
Runner-up	J.League Cup	2007
- * Club domestic league appearances and goals

Taku Harada (原田 拓, Harada Taku; born October 27, 1982) is a former Japanese football player.

== Playing career ==
Harada was born in Kumamoto on October 27, 1982. After graduating from high school, he joined the J1 League club Nagoya Grampus Eight in 2001. Although he played several matches every season from the first season, he did not play in many matches. In 2004, he moved to the J1 club Oita Trinita. He became a regular player and played many matches under manager Han Berger, starting in May 2004. However his opportunity to play decreased in 2005. In June 2005, he moved to the J1 club Kawasaki Frontale. Although he played many in matches as a substitute midfielder until 2006, he did not play much in 2007. In 2009, he moved to the J2 League club Roasso Kumamoto. He became a regular player and played many matches as a defensive midfielder. However his opportunity to play decreased in 2014 and he retired at the end of the 2014 season.

== Club statistics ==
Club performance			League		Cup		League Cup		Continental		Total	
Season	Club	League	Apps	Goals	Apps	Goals	Apps	Goals	Apps	Goals	Apps	Goals
Japan			League		Emperor's Cup		J.League Cup		Asia		Total	
2001	Nagoya Grampus Eight	J1 League	3	0	1	0	0	0	-		4	0
2002	Nagoya Grampus Eight	J1 League	3	0	3	0	0	0	-		6	0
2003	Nagoya Grampus Eight	J1 League	1	0	0	0	1	0	-		2	0
2004	Oita Trinita	J1 League	20	2	2	0	6	0	-		28	2
2005	Oita Trinita	J1 League	8	0	0	0	2	0	-		10	0
2005	Kawasaki Frontale	J1 League	12	0	3	0	0	0	-		15	0
2006	Kawasaki Frontale	J1 League	15	1	1	0	4	0	-		20	1
2007	Kawasaki Frontale	J1 League	7	0	1	0	2	0	2	2	12	2
2008	Kawasaki Frontale	J1 League	2	0	0	0	0	0	-		2	0
2009	Roasso Kumamoto	J2 League	43	1	0	0	-		-		43	1
2010	Roasso Kumamoto	J2 League	27	0	1	0	-		-		28	0
2011	Roasso Kumamoto	J2 League	36	2	1	0	-		-		37	2
2012	Roasso Kumamoto	J2 League	35	0	3	0	-		-		38	0
2013	Roasso Kumamoto	J2 League	34	1	1	0	-		-		35	1
2014	Roasso Kumamoto	J2 League	11	0	1	0	-		-		12	0
Career total			257	7	18	0	15	0	2	2	292	9
