= Yui Minami =

Japanese gravure idol (born 1990)

- 南 結衣
- Born: Saaya Ogura; August 5, 1990 (age 36); Saitama Prefecture, Japan
- Other name: YuiYui
- Occupations: Gravure idol, actress
- Years active: 2001 -
- Agent: JMO
- Spouse: Nozomi Osako (2014 -)

Saaya Osako (大迫 沙綾, Ōsako Saaya; née Ogura (小倉), born August 5, 1990, in Saitama Prefecture, Japan), better known as Yui Minami (南 結衣, Minami Yui), is a Japanese gravure idol and former child actress who is represented by the talent agency JMO.

She is nicknamed YuiYui (ゆいゆい). She graduated from Ryutsu Keizai University's Department of Sociology.

== Biography ==
In 2007, Minami appeared in Sei Kore GP of Weekly Young Jump.

The same year on September 11, she officially joined the Minamikuzu Shooters' Geinōjin Joshi Futsal. Minami is the youngest in the team and her uniform number is 12. She is participated as a trainee in the team.

On August 18, 2010, Minami joined into a group called Shake and she had done singing activities.

She married professional footballer Nozomi Osako of Verspah Oita on November 1, 2014. They later moved to Oita Prefecture.

== Filmography ==
=== TV series ===
Year	Title	Network	Notes
2010	Six Hunter II: Saikyōdamashī e no Michinori	TV Aichi	
2010	Gu Tama	J:Com	
2011	Suteki+Life	J:Com	
2012	Jimotopi Suginami	J:Com	
