= Kosuke Taketomi =

Japanese footballer

Kosuke Taketomi 武富 孝介
Personal information
- Full name: Kosuke Taketomi
- Date of birth: September 23, 1990 (age 36)
- Place of birth: Saitama, Japan
- Height: 1.73 m (5 ft 8 in)
- Position: Midfielder

Team information
- Current team: Ventforet Kofu
- Number: 8

Youth career
- 2003–2008: Kashiwa Reysol Youth

Senior career*
Years	Team	Apps	(Gls)
2009–2017	Kashiwa Reysol	81	(15)
2011–2012	→ Roasso Kumamoto (loan)	70	(15)
2013–2014	→ Shonan Bellmare (loan)	60	(12)
2018–2020	Urawa Red Diamonds	16	(0)
2019	→ Shonan Bellmare (loan)	18	(5)
2021–2022	Kyoto Sanga	35	(4)
2023–	Ventforet Kofu	24	(4)
Medal record
Urawa Reds
Winner	Emperor's Cup	2018
- * Club domestic league appearances and goals as of 15:05, 24 October 2023 (UTC)

Kosuke Taketomi (武富 孝介, born September 23, 1990) is a Japanese footballer who plays as a midfielder for J2 League club Ventforet Kofu.

== Club statistics ==
As of 24 October 2023

Appearances and goals by club, season and competition
Club	Season	League			Emperor's Cup		J. League Cup		AFC		Other		Total	
Club	Season	Division	Apps	Goals	Apps	Goals	Apps	Goals	Apps	Goals	Apps	Goals	Apps	Goals
Kashiwa Reysol	2009	J1 League	0	0	0	0	0	0	–		–		0	0
Kashiwa Reysol	2010	J2 League	1	1	0	0	–		–		–		1	1
Roasso Kumamoto (loan)	2011	J2 League	33	1	1	0	–		–		–		34	1
Roasso Kumamoto (loan)	2012	J2 League	37	14	3	2	–		–		–		40	16
Shonan Bellmare (loan)	2013	J1 League	21	3	2	3	5	1	–		–		28	7
Shonan Bellmare (loan)	2014	J2 League	39	9	1	0	–		–		–		40	9
Kashiwa Reysol	2015	J1 League	28	2	2	0	2	0	9	4	–		41	6
Kashiwa Reysol	2016	J1 League	26	3	3	0	6	1	–		–		35	4
Kashiwa Reysol	2017	J1 League	26	9	3	0	3	0	–		–		32	9
Urawa Red Diamonds	2018	J1 League	8	0	0	0	8	2	–		–		16	2
Shonan Bellmare (loan)	2019	J1 League	18	5	1	0	2	0	–		–		21	5
Urawa Red Diamonds	2020	J1 League	8	0	–		0	0	–		–		8	0
Kyoto Sanga	2021	J2 League	10	1	0	0	–		–		–		10	1
Kyoto Sanga	2022	J1 League	25	3	1	0	2	0	–		–		28	3
Ventforet Kofu	2023	J2 League	24	4	1	0	–		2	0	1 (Note: Appearance in the Japanese Super Cup)	0	28	4
Career total			304	55	18	5	28	4	11	4	1	0	362	68

== Honours ==
- J. League Division 2 (2) : 2010, 2014
