= Hashiuchi =

Hashiuchi (written: 橋内) is a Japanese surname. Notable people with the surname include:

- Ryoma Hashiuchi (橋内 竜真, born 1989), Japanese footballer
- Yuya Hashiuchi (橋内 優也, born 1987), Japanese footballer
