= Yu Eto =

Japanese footballer

Personal information
- Full name: Yu Eto
- Date of birth: 17 October 1983 (age 43)
- Place of birth: Ōnojō, Fukuoka, Japan
- Height: 1.73 m (5 ft 8 in)
- Position: Midfielder

Youth career
- 2002–2005: Fukuoka University

Senior career*
Years	Team	Apps	(Gls)
2006–2010	Sagan Tosu	104	(7)
2011–2015	Tokushima Vortis	116	(15)
2016–2017	Kataller Toyama	46	(5)
Total		266	(27)
- * Club domestic league appearances and goals

Yu Eto (衛藤 裕, Eto Yū; born 17 October 1983 in Ōnojō, Fukuoka) is a former Japanese footballer who last played for Kataller Toyama.

== Career statistics ==
Appearances and goals by club, season and competition
Club	Season	League			Emperor's Cup		J. League Cup		Total	
Club	Season	Division	Apps	Goals	Apps	Goals	Apps	Goals	Apps	Goals
Sagan Tosu	2006	J2 League	29	2	2	0	-		31	2
Sagan Tosu	2007	J2 League	22	2	3	1	-		25	3
Sagan Tosu	2008	J2 League	23	0	0	0	-		23	0
Sagan Tosu	2009	J2 League	1	0	2	0	-		3	0
Sagan Tosu	2010	J2 League	29	3	2	1	-		31	4
Sagan Tosu	Total		104	7	9	2	0	0	113	9
Tokushima Vortis	2011	J2 League	37	4	1	0	-		38	4
Tokushima Vortis	2012	J2 League	35	6	1	0	-		36	6
Tokushima Vortis	2013	J2 League	7	0	0	0	-		7	0
Tokushima Vortis	2014	J1 League	25	4	1	0	4	0	30	4
Tokushima Vortis	2015	J2 League	12	1	3	1	-		15	2
Tokushima Vortis	Total		116	15	6	1	4	0	126	16
Kataller Toyama	2016	J3 League	25	2	2	1	-		27	3
Kataller Toyama	2017	J3 League	21	3	1	0	-		22	3
Kataller Toyama	Total		46	5	3	1	0	0	49	6
Total			266	27	18	4	4	0	288	31
