= Yuki Natsume =

Japanese footballer

Personal information
- Full name: Yuki Natsume
- Date of birth: November 18, 1988 (age 37)
- Place of birth: Fukui, Japan
- Height: 1.84 m (6 ft 1/2 in)
- Position: Forward

Youth career
- 2007–2010: Komazawa University

Senior career*
Years	Team	Apps	(Gls)
2011–2013	Kawasaki Frontale	4	(0)
2012	→Tochigi SC (loan)	34	(1)
2014–2015	Matsumoto Yamaga FC	5	(0)
Total		43	(1)
- * Club domestic league appearances and goals

Yuki Natsume (棗 佑喜, Natsume Yūki; born November 18, 1988) is a former Japanese football player.
