= Ryota Kajikawa =

Japanese footballer (born 1989)

Personal information
- Full name: Ryota Kajikawa
- Date of birth: April 17, 1989 (age 37)
- Place of birth: Takasago, Hyōgo, Japan
- Height: 1.64 m (5 ft 4 1/2 in)
- Position: Midfielder

Team information
- Current team: Fujieda MYFC
- Number: 23

Youth career
- 2005–2007: Kwansei Gakuin High School

College career
Years	Team	Apps	(Gls)
2008–2011	Kwansei Gakuin University		

Senior career*
Years	Team	Apps	(Gls)
2011–2012	Tokyo Verdy	38	(3)
2013–2015	Shonan Bellmare	29	(2)
2015	→ V-Varen Nagasaki (loan)	40	(6)
2016	V-Varen Nagasaki	40	(3)
2017–2019	Tokyo Verdy	109	(3)
2020–2021	Tokushima Vortis	15	(0)
2021	→ Tokyo Verdy (loan)	37	(3)
2021–2023	Tokyo Verdy	29	(1)
2024–	Fujieda MYFC	56	(1)
- * Club domestic league appearances and goals as of 13 August 2026

Ryota Kajikawa (梶川 諒太, born April 17, 1989) is a Japanese professional footballer who plays as a midfielder for Fujieda MYFC.

Kajikawa has made over 360 appearances in the J2 League. He has spent most of his career with Tokyo Verdy, starting his career with them and re-joining them three times.

== Career ==
On 3 December 2011, Kajikawa was promoted to the Tokyo Verdy first team from the 2012 season.

On 12 December 2012, Kajikawa was announced at Shonan Bellmare on a permanent transfer.

On 5 January 2015, Kajikawa was announced at V-Varen Nagasaki on a one year loan. On 28 December 2015, he joined the club on a permanent transfer.

During his time at V-Varen Nagasaki, Kajikawa was vice-captain, and also worked as president of the Nagasaki Player's Association.

On 16 December 2016, Kajikawa was announced at Tokyo Verdy on a permanent transfer.

On 6 January 2020, Kajikawa was announced at Tokushima Vortis on a permanent transfer.

On 13 January 2021, Kajikawa was announced at Tokyo Verdy on a one year loan. On 25 December 2021, he joined Tokyo Verdy on a permanent transfer. At the beginning of the 2022 season, Kajikawa was appointed vice-captain, along with Boniface Nduka and Rihito Yamamoto. In April 2023, he suffered an anterior cruciate ligament injury to his right knee and was expected to be out for 8 months. On 7 December 2023, the club announced it would not be renewing Kajikawa's contract for the 2024 season.

On 29 December 2023, Kajikawa was announced at Fujieda MYFC on a permanent transfer.

== Charity work ==
In 2015, he and his Tokyo Verdy teammate Junki Koike set up "F-connect", which supports children in orphanages.

== Career statistics ==
Updated to end of 2018 season.

Appearances and goals by club, season and competition
Club	Season	League			Emperor's Cup		J. League Cup		Total	
Club	Season	Division	Apps	Goals	Apps	Goals	Apps	Goals	Apps	Goals
Tokyo Verdy	2011	J2 League	3	0	0	0	-		3	0
Tokyo Verdy	2012	J2 League	35	3	2	1	-		37	4
Shonan Bellmare	2013	J1 League	23	2	1	0	4	0	28	2
Shonan Bellmare	2014	J2 League	6	0	0	0	-		6	0
V-Varen Nagasaki	2015	J2 League	40	6	1	0	-		41	6
V-Varen Nagasaki	2016	J2 League	40	3	1	0	-		41	3
Tokyo Verdy	2017	J2 League	41	1	0	0	-		41	1
Tokyo Verdy	2018	J2 League	34	0	2	0	-		36	0
Total			222	15	7	1	4	0	232	16
