= Shohei Takahashi =

Japanese footballer

Shohei Takahashi 高橋 祥平
Personal information
- Full name: Shohei Takahashi
- Date of birth: 27 October 1991 (age 35)
- Place of birth: Higashiyamato, Tokyo, Japan
- Height: 1.80 m (5 ft 11 in)
- Position: Centre back

Team information
- Current team: Matsumoto Yamaga
- Number: 4

Youth career
- 2000–2009: Tokyo Verdy

Senior career*
| Years | Team | Apps | (Gls) |
| 2009–2012 | Tokyo Verdy | 111 | (9) |
| 2013–2014 | Omiya Ardija | 66 | (7) |
| 2015–2016 | Vissel Kobe | 39 | (2) |
| 2017–2020 | Júbilo Iwata | 82 | (0) |
| 2020 | → Tokyo Verdy (loan) | 29 | (2) |
| 2021–2023 | Machida Zelvia | 74 | (2) |
| 2023 | → Vissel Kobe (loan) | 0 | (0) |
| 2024– | Matsumoto Yamaga | 30 | (2) |

International career
| 2012 | Japan U-23 | | |
- * Club domestic league appearances and goals as of 1 January 2026

Shohei Takahashi (高橋 祥平, Takahashi Shōhei; born 27 October 1991) is a Japanese footballer who plays as a centre-back for J3 League club Matsumoto Yamaga.

== Career ==
He is a versatile defender who can operate as a left full back or as a centre back. Takahashi began his professional career with Tokyo Verdy in March 2007 at the age of 17.

== Club career statistics ==
Updated to 19 February 2019.

| Club | Season | League | | Emperor's Cup | | J. League Cup | | Total | |
| Club | Season | Apps | Goals | Apps | Goals | Apps | Goals | Apps | Goals |
|---|---|---|---|---|---|---|---|---|---|
| Tokyo Verdy | 2009 | 25 | 1 | 0 | 0 | - | | 25 | 1 |
| Tokyo Verdy | 2010 | 20 | 1 | 1 | 0 | - | | 21 | 1 |
| Tokyo Verdy | 2011 | 28 | 1 | 2 | 0 | - | | 30 | 1 |
| Tokyo Verdy | 2012 | 38 | 6 | 2 | 0 | - | | 40 | 6 |
| Tokyo Verdy | Total | 111 | 9 | 5 | 0 | - | | 116 | 9 |
| Omiya Ardija | 2013 | 32 | 1 | 3 | 0 | 4 | 0 | 39 | 1 |
| Omiya Ardija | 2014 | 34 | 6 | 2 | 0 | 6 | 0 | 42 | 6 |
| Omiya Ardija | Total | 66 | 7 | 5 | 0 | 10 | 0 | 81 | 7 |
| Vissel Kobe | 2015 | 26 | 2 | 3 | 0 | 6 | 0 | 35 | 2 |
| Vissel Kobe | 2016 | 13 | 0 | 2 | 1 | 6 | 0 | 21 | 1 |
| Vissel Kobe | Total | 39 | 2 | 5 | 1 | 12 | 0 | 56 | 3 |
| Júbilo Iwata | 2017 | 28 | 0 | 3 | 1 | 4 | 1 | 35 | 2 |
| Júbilo Iwata | 2018 | 34 | 0 | 2 | 0 | 4 | 0 | 40 | 0 |
| Júbilo Iwata | Total | 62 | 0 | 5 | 1 | 8 | 1 | 75 | 2 |
| Career Total | | 268 | 18 | 20 | 2 | 30 | 1 | 328 | 21 |
