= Kazuto Tsuyuki =

Japanese footballer

Personal information
- Full name: Kazuto Tsuyuki
- Date of birth: August 14, 1984 (age 42)
- Place of birth: Shizuoka, Japan
- Height: 1.71 m (5 ft 7 1/2 in)
- Position: Defender

Youth career
- 2003–2006: Komazawa University

Senior career*
Years	Team	Apps	(Gls)
2007–2008	Nagoya Grampus	0	(0)
2009	Tokushima Vortis	19	(0)
2010–2013	Roasso Kumamoto	102	(1)
Total		121	(1)
- * Club domestic league appearances and goals

Kazuto Tsuyuki (筑城 和人, Tsuyuki Kazuto; born August 14, 1984) is a former Japanese football player.

Tsuyuki played two seasons for the Nagoya Grampus Eight in the Japanese J1, the top flight of professional football.

He decided to retire from football on December 15, 2013.

== Career statistics ==
Appearances and goals by club, season and competition
Club	Season	League			Emperor's Cup		J.League Cup		Total	
Club	Season	Division	Apps	Goals	Apps	Goals	Apps	Goals	Apps	Goals
Nagoya Grampus Eight	2007	J1 League	0	0	0	0	0	0	0	0
Nagoya Grampus Eight	2008	J1 League	0	0	0	0	0	0	0	0
Tokushima Vortis	2009	J2 League	19	0	0	0	—		19	0
Roasso Kumamoto	2010	J2 League	34	1	2	0	—		36	1
Roasso Kumamoto	2011	J2 League	19	0	1	0	—		20	0
Roasso Kumamoto	2012	J2 League	22	0	0	0	—		22	0
Roasso Kumamoto	2013	J2 League	27	0	1	0	—		28	0
Career total			121	1	4	0	0	0	125	1
