= Nozomi Osako =

Japanese footballer

Nozomi Osako 大迫 希
Personal information
- Full name: Nozomi Ōsako
- Date of birth: November 27, 1990 (age 35)
- Place of birth: Satsumasendai, Japan
- Height: 1.73 m (5 ft 8 in)
- Position: Winger

Team information
- Current team: Fujieda MYFC
- Number: 10

Youth career
- 2006–2008: Kagoshima Josei High School

Senior career*
Years	Team	Apps	(Gls)
2009–2014	Roasso Kumamoto	83	(11)
2015	Verspah Oita	19	(0)
2016–	Fujieda MYFC	51	(5)
- * Club domestic league appearances and goals as of 23 February 2018

Nozomi Osako (大迫 希, Ōsako Nozomi) (born November 27, 1990, in Satsumasendai, Kagoshima) is a Japanese football player who currently plays for Fujieda MYFC.

== Personal life ==
Osako married Japanese gravure idol Yui Minami on November 1, 2014. They later moved to Oita Prefecture.

== Club career stats ==
Updated to 23 February 2018.

Club performance			League		Cup		League Cup		Total	
Season	Club	League	Apps	Goals	Apps	Goals	Apps	Goals	Apps	Goals
Japan			League		Emperor's Cup		League Cup		Total	
2009	Roasso Kumamoto	J2 League	5	0	1	0	-		6	0
2010	Roasso Kumamoto	J2 League	4	0	1	0	-		5	0
2011	Roasso Kumamoto	J2 League	28	5	1	0	-		29	5
2012	Roasso Kumamoto	J2 League	24	3	3	1	-		27	4
2013	Roasso Kumamoto	J2 League	17	3	2	0	-		19	3
2014	Roasso Kumamoto	J2 League	5	0	1	0	-		6	0
2015	Verspah Oita	JFL	19	0	2	0	-		21	0
2016	Fujieda MYFC	J3 League	26	2	–		–		26	2
2017	Fujieda MYFC	J3 League	25	3	–		–		25	3
Career total			163	16	11	1	0	0	174	17
