= Yutaro Takahashi =

Japanese footballer

Personal information
- Full name: Yutaro Takahashi
- Date of birth: October 3, 1987 (age 39)
- Place of birth: Fukuoka, Japan
- Height: 1.82 m (5 ft 11 1/2 in)
- Position: Forward

Youth career
- 2006–2009: Fukuoka University

Senior career*
Years	Team	Apps	(Gls)
2010	Vissel Kobe	0	(0)
2011	Cerezo Osaka	0	(0)
2012–2014	Roasso Kumamoto	53	(5)
2015	V-Varen Nagasaki	25	(1)
Total		78	(6)
- * Club domestic league appearances and goals

Yutaro Takahashi (高橋 祐太郎, Takahashi Yūtarō; born October 3, 1987) is a former Japanese football player.

His elder brother Daisuke is also a former Japanese footballer.

== Career statistics ==
Appearances and goals by club, season and competition
Club	Season	League			Emperor's Cup		J.League Cup		Total	
Club	Season	Division	Apps	Goals	Apps	Goals	Apps	Goals	Apps	Goals
Vissel Kobe	2010	J1 League	0	0	0	0	1	0	1	0
Cerezo Osaka	2011	J1 League	0	0	0	0	0	0	0	0
Roasso Kumamoto	2012	J2 League	22	2	1	0	—		23	2
Roasso Kumamoto	2013	J2 League	29	3	1	0	—		30	3
Roasso Kumamoto	2014	J2 League					—			
Career total			51	5	2	0	1	0	54	5
