= Yuji Yabu =

Japanese footballer

Yuji Yabu 養父 雄仁
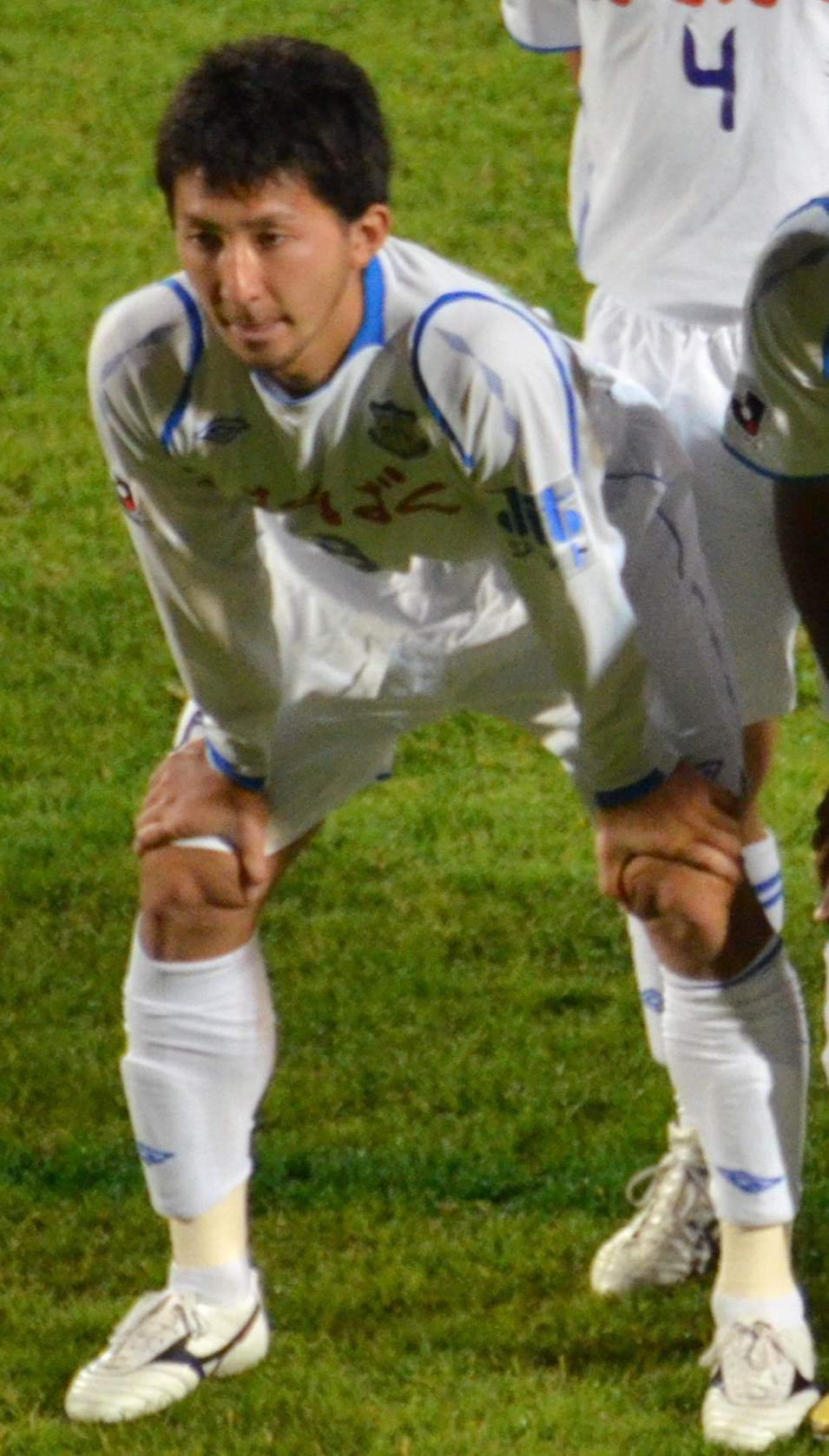
- Yuji Yabu's signature squat

Personal information
- Full name: Yuji Yabu
- Date of birth: May 24, 1984 (age 42)
- Place of birth: Isehara, Kanagawa, Japan
- Height: 1.76 m (5 ft 9 in)
- Position: Midfielder

Youth career
- 2003–2006: Kokushikan University

Senior career*
Years	Team	Apps	(Gls)
2007–2009	Kawasaki Frontale	17	(2)
2010–2011	Ventforet Kofu	41	(6)
2012–2015	Roasso Kumamoto	149	(27)
2016–2017	V-Varen Nagasaki	27	(0)
2018–2019	Fujieda MYFC	25	(3)
Medal record
Kawasaki Frontale
Runner-up	J1 League	2008
Runner-up	J1 League	2009
Runner-up	J.League Cup	2007
Runner-up	J.League Cup	2009
- * Club domestic league appearances and goals as of 14 January 2020

Yuji Yabu (養父 雄仁, Yabu Yuji; born May 24, 1984) is a Japanese former football player.

== Career ==
Yabu retired at the end of the 2019 season.

== Club statistics ==
Updated to 23 February 2020.

Club performance			League		Cup		League Cup		Continental		Total	
Season	Club	League	Apps	Goals	Apps	Goals	Apps	Goals	Apps	Goals	Apps	Goals
Japan			League		Emperor's Cup		J. League Cup		AFC		Total	
2003	Kokushikan University	JFL	3	1	-		-		-		3	1
2004	Kokushikan University	JFL	5	0	-		-		-		5	0
2007	Kawasaki Frontale	J1 League	5	1	0	0	0	0	1	0	6	1
2008	Kawasaki Frontale	J1 League	4	0	0	0	5	0	-		9	0
2009	Kawasaki Frontale	J1 League	8	1	0	0	3	0	1	0	12	1
2010	Ventforet Kofu	J2 League	29	5	2	0	-		-		31	5
2011	Ventforet Kofu	J1 League	12	1	1	1	1	0	-		14	2
2012	Roasso Kumamoto	J2 League	40	1	3	1	-		-		43	2
2013	Roasso Kumamoto	J2 League	29	2	2	1	-		-		31	3
2014	Roasso Kumamoto	J2 League	41	6	1	0	-		-		42	6
2015	Roasso Kumamoto	J2 League	39	3	1	0	-		-		40	3
2016	V-Varen Nagasaki	J2 League	13	0	1	0	-		-		14	0
2017	V-Varen Nagasaki	14	0	0	0	-		-		14	0	
2018	Fujieda MYFC	J3 League	25	3	-		-		-		25	3
2019	Fujieda MYFC	J3 League	0	0	-		-		-		0	0
Total			259	23	11	3	9	0	2	0	281	26
