= Tomonobu Hiroi =

Japanese footballer

Tomonobu Hiroi 廣井 友信
Personal information
- Full name: Tomonobu Hiroi
- Date of birth: 11 January 1985 (age 41)
- Place of birth: Hino, Tokyo, Japan
- Height: 1.80 m (5 ft 11 in)
- Position: Defender

Team information
- Current team: Zweigen Kanazawa
- Number: 27

Youth career
- 2000–2002: Maebashiikuei High School
- 2003–2006: Komazawa University

Senior career*
Years	Team	Apps	(Gls)
2007–2014	Shimizu S-Pulse	14	(0)
2009	→ Tokyo Verdy (loan)	7	(0)
2011–2012	→ Roasso Kumamoto (loan)	57	(1)
2015–	Zweigen Kanazawa	71	(1)
Medal record
Shimizu S-Pulse
Runner-up	J.League Cup	2008
Runner-up	Emperor's Cup	2010
- * Club domestic league appearances and goals as of 1 January 2019

Tomonobu Hiroi (廣井 友信 Hiroi Tomobu, born 11 January 1985 in Hino, Tokyo) is a Japanese football player currently playing for J2 League team Zweigen Kanazawa.

== Career ==
He graduated from Komazawa University in 2006, Hiori signed full professional terms with S-Pulse the following year, but is yet to break into the first team on a regular basis.

== Career statistics ==
Updated to end of 2018 season.

Appearances and goals by club, season and competition
Club	Season	League			Emperor's Cup		J.League Cup		Total	
Club	Season	Division	Apps	Goals	Apps	Goals	Apps	Goals	Apps	Goals
Shimizu S-Pulse	2007	J1 League	0	0	0	0	0	0	0	0
Shimizu S-Pulse	2008	J1 League	0	0	0	0	2	0	2	0
Shimizu S-Pulse	2009	J1 League	1	0	—		1	0	2	0
Tokyo Verdy	2009	J2 League	7	0	1	0	—		8	0
Shimizu S-Pulse	2010	J1 League	4	0	2	0	1	0	7	0
Roasso Kumamoto	2011	J2 League	21	0	0	0	—		21	0
Roasso Kumamoto	2012	J2 League	36	1	3	0	—		39	1
Shimizu S-Pulse	2013	J1 League	3	0	0	0	1	0	4	0
Shimizu S-Pulse	2014	J1 League	6	0	1	0	2	0	9	0
Zweigen Kanazawa	2015	J2 League	15	0	0	0	—		15	0
Zweigen Kanazawa	2016	J2 League	31	0	1	0	—		32	0
Zweigen Kanazawa	2017	J2 League	19	1	1	0	—		20	1
Zweigen Kanazawa	2018	J2 League	6	0	1	0	—		7	0
Career total			149	2	9	0	7	0	166	2
