= Kota Fukatsu =

Japanese footballer

Kota Fukatsu 深津 康太
Personal information
- Full name: Kota Fukatsu
- Date of birth: August 10, 1984 (age 42)
- Place of birth: Inzai, Chiba, Japan
- Height: 1.81 m (5 ft 11 1/2 in)
- Position: Defender

Team information
- Current team: Iwate Grulla Morioka
- Number: 51

Youth career
- 2000–2002: Ryutsu Keizai University Kashiwa High School

Senior career*
Years	Team	Apps	(Gls)
2003–2006	Nagoya Grampus Eight	4	(0)
2005	→ Mito HollyHock (loan)	39	(3)
2006	Kashiwa Reysol	0	(0)
2007–2008	Gifu	56	(4)
2009–2010	Machida Zelvia	56	(3)
2011–2012	Tokyo Verdy	49	(4)
2013–2023	Machida Zelvia	379	(17)
2023-	Iwate Grulla Morioka	5	(0)
Total		588	(31)
- * Club domestic league appearances and goals as of 18:59 8 January 2024 (AEST)

Kota Fukatsu (深津 康太, Fukatsu Kōta; born 10 August 1984) is a Japanese football player who plays for Iwate Grulla Morioka.

== Club statistics ==
As of end of 2018 season

Club performance			League		Cup		League Cup		Other		Total	
Season	Club	League	Apps	Goals	Apps	Goals	Apps	Goals	Apps	Goals	Apps	Goals
Japan			League		Emperor's Cup		J.League Cup		Other^{1}		Total	
2003	Nagoya Grampus Eight	J1 League	1	0	0	0	0	0	-		1	0
2004	Nagoya Grampus Eight	J1 League	0	0	0	0	0	0	-		0	0
2005	Mito HollyHock	J2 League	39	3	2	1	-		-		41	4
2006	Nagoya Grampus Eight	J1 League	3	0	0	0	3	0	-		6	0
2006	Kashiwa Reysol	J1 League	0	0	1	0	0	0	-		1	0
2007	FC Gifu	JFL	29	4	1	0	-		-		30	4
2008	FC Gifu	J2 League	27	0	1	0	-		-		28	0
2009	FC Machida Zelvia	JFL	29	1	-		-		-		29	1
2010	FC Machida Zelvia	JFL	27	2	0	0	-		-		29	2
2011	Tokyo Verdy	J2 League	17	1	0	0	-		-		17	1
2012	Tokyo Verdy	J2 League	32	3	0	0	-		-		32	3
2013	FC Machida Zelvia	JFL	29	3	-		-		-		29	3
2014	FC Machida Zelvia	J3 League	29	4	-		-		-		29	4
2015	FC Machida Zelvia	J3 League	34	1	0	0	-		2	0	36	1
2016	FC Machida Zelvia	J2 League	13	1	0	0	–		–		13	1
2017	FC Machida Zelvia	J2 League	31	0	0	0	–		–		31	0
2018	FC Machida Zelvia	J2 League	38	3	1	0	–		–		39	3
Total			378	26	6	1	3	0	2	0	389	27

^{1}Includes J2/J3 Playoffs.
