= Kazuki Saito (footballer, born 1988) =

Japanese footballer

Kazuki Saito 齊藤 和樹
Personal information
- Full name: Kazuki Saito
- Date of birth: 21 November 1988 (age 37)
- Place of birth: Shimizu-ku, Shizuoka, Japan
- Height: 1.78 m (5 ft 10 in)
- Position: Forward

Team information
- Current team: Criacao Shinjuku
- Number: 3

Youth career
- 2007–2010: Chukyo University

Senior career*
| Years | Team | Apps | (Gls) |
| 2011–2015 | Roasso Kumamoto | 156 | (31) |
| 2016–2017 | Júbilo Iwata | 24 | (0) |
| 2018–2022 | Fagiano Okayama | 112 | (7) |
| 2023– | Criacao Shinjuku | 0 | (0) |
- * Club domestic league appearances and goals as of 24 February 2023, 10:20 (UTC)

Kazuki Saito (齊藤 和樹, Saitō Kazuki; born November 21, 1988) is a Japanese football who play as Forward and currently play for Criacao Shinjuku.

== Career ==
Saito was member of the soccer club of Chukyo University. He uses dribbling with a unique rhythm as a weapon, and at the 59th All Japan University Football Championship, he won the Outstanding Player Award as the best FW that led Chukyo University to the second place.

At the beginning of his professional career, he was not able to leave a good track record, but as the quality of post-play improved, he blossomed at once and grew into a central player in Kumamoto's offensive line.

He performed well in the 2012 Emperor's Cup, scoring three goals, including two against the Nagoya Grampus Eight.

In 2013 and 2014, he participated in almost all games except for withdrawals due to accumulated warnings, leading the team's attack and recording his first double-digit score in the 2015 season.

On 20 December 2015, Saito transferred to Jubilo Iwata from 2016. He scored a hat-trick in the Emperor's Cup first round match against FC Gifu SECOND.

On 13 December 2017, Saito joined to Fagiano Okayama as a permanent transfer.

On 10 October 2022, Saito announcement expiration of the contract. On 29 November the same year, he participated in the J League joint tryout held at Kanseki Stadium Tochigi.

On 9 January 2023, Saito announcement officially transfer to Criacao Shinjuku for ahead of 2023 season.

== Career statistics ==
=== Club ===
Updated to the start of 2023 season.

Appearances and goals by club, season and competition
| Club | Season | League | | | Emperor's Cup | | J.League Cup | | Total | |
| Club | Season | Division | Apps | Goals | Apps | Goals | Apps | Goals | Apps | Goals |
|---|---|---|---|---|---|---|---|---|---|---|
| Roasso Kumamoto | 2011 | J2 League | 7 | 0 | 0 | 0 | — | | 7 | 0 |
| Roasso Kumamoto | 2012 | J2 League | 30 | 4 | 2 | 3 | — | | 32 | 7 |
| Roasso Kumamoto | 2013 | J2 League | 37 | 8 | 1 | 0 | — | | 38 | 8 |
| Roasso Kumamoto | 2014 | J2 League | 41 | 7 | 1 | 0 | — | | 42 | 7 |
| Roasso Kumamoto | 2015 | J2 League | 41 | 12 | 3 | 0 | — | | 44 | 12 |
| Júbilo Iwata | 2016 | J1 League | 17 | 0 | 3 | 3 | 6 | 1 | 26 | 4 |
| Júbilo Iwata | 2017 | J1 League | 7 | 0 | 3 | 1 | 6 | 0 | 16 | 1 |
| Fagiano Okayama | 2018 | J2 League | 38 | 3 | 0 | 0 | — | | 38 | 3 |
| Fagiano Okayama | 2019 | J2 League | 8 | 1 | 0 | 0 | - | | 8 | 1 |
| Fagiano Okayama | 2020 | J2 League | 36 | 3 | - | | - | | 36 | 3 |
| Fagiano Okayama | 2021 | J2 League | 19 | 0 | 0 | 0 | - | | 19 | 0 |
| Fagiano Okayama | 2022 | J2 League | 11 | 0 | 0 | 0 | - | | 11 | 0 |
| Criacao Shinjuku | 2023 | Japan Football League | 0 | 0 | 0 | 0 | — | | 0 | 0 |
| Career total | | | 292 | 38 | 13 | 7 | 12 | 1 | 318 | 46 |
