= Yuichi Yamauchi =

Japanese footballer (born 1984)

Personal information
- Date of birth: October 26, 1984 (age 42)
- Place of birth: Kumamoto, Kumamoto, Japan
- Height: 1.63 m (5 ft 4 in)
- Position: Forward

Youth career
- 2003–2006: Fukuoka University

Senior career*
Years	Team	Apps	(Gls)
2007–2010	Roasso Kumamoto	50	(6)
2011	V-Varen Nagasaki	17	(2)
2012	Blacktown City	25	(7)
2013	Sydney United	17	(2)
2014	TTM Customs		
Total		109	(17)
- * Club domestic league appearances and goals

Yuichi Yamauchi (山内 祐一, Yamauchi Yuichi; born October 26, 1984) is a former Japanese football player.

== Club statistics ==
Club performance			League		Cup		Total	
Season	Club	League	Apps	Goals	Apps	Goals	Apps	Goals
Japan			League		Emperor's Cup		Total	
2007	Rosso Kumamoto	Football League	9	0	0	0	9	0
2008	Roasso Kumamoto	J2 League	12	1	0	0	12	1
2009	Roasso Kumamoto	J2 League	20	5	1	0	21	5
2010	Roasso Kumamoto	J2 League						
Country	Japan		41	6	1	0	42	6
Total			41	6	1	0	42	6
