= Junki Koike =

Japanese football player (born 1987)

Junki Koike 小池 純輝
Personal information
- Full name: Junki Koike
- Date of birth: May 11, 1987 (age 39)
- Place of birth: Ranzan, Saitama, Japan
- Height: 1.79 m (5 ft 10 in)
- Position: Midfielder

Team information
- Current team: Codeo Kawagoe FC
- Number: 19

Youth career
- 2003–2005: Urawa Red Diamonds Youth

Senior career*
Years	Team	Apps	(Gls)
2006–2008	Urawa Red Diamonds	4	(0)
2009	Thespa Kusatsu	49	(6)
2010–2011	Mito HollyHock	67	(6)
2012–2013	Tokyo Verdy	59	(8)
2014–2015	Yokohama FC	77	(9)
2016–2017	JEF United Chiba	9	(0)
2017	→ Ehime FC (loan)	32	(0)
2018	Ehime FC	36	(3)
2019–2024	Tokyo Verdy	218	(51)
2024–2025	Criacao Shinjuku	26	(1)
2026–	Codeo Kawagoe FC		
Medal record
Urawa Reds
Winner	AFC Champions League	2007
Winner	J1 League	2006
Runner-up	J1 League	2007
Winner	Emperor's Cup	2006
- * Club domestic league appearances and goals as of 11:29, 20 April 2026 (UTC)

Junki Koike (小池 純輝, Koike Junki; born May 11, 1987) is a Japanese footballer who plays as a midfielder for Codeo Kawagoe FC.

Koike has over 400 J2 League appearances. He has served as vice-chairman of the Japan Professional Footballers' Association.

His all time favourite player is Kazuyoshi Miura - who he assisted to help Miura claim the record for oldest goalscorer in the J League.

== Career ==
On 9 January 2012, Koike was announced at Tokyo Verdy on a permanent transfer.

On 12 January 2014, Koike was announced at Yokohama FC on a permanent transfer.

On 30 December 2015, Koike was announced at JEF United Chiba on a permanent transfer.

On 29 December 2016, Koike was announced at Ehime FC on a one year loan deal.

On 19 December 2017, Koike was announced at Ehime FC on a permanent transfer.

On 27 December 2018, Koike was announced at Tokyo Verdy on a permanent transfer. On 7 November 2020, Koike played his 400th J2 League match against Tokushima Vortis. At the beginning of the 2021 season, he was appointed as one of five vice captains. On 25 December 2021, he renewed his contract with the club for the 2022 season. On 7 December 2023, the club announced it would not be renewing Koike's contract for the 2024 season.

On 5 January 2024, Koike was announced at Criacao Shinjuku on a permanent transfer.

== Charity work ==
In 2015, he and his Tokyo Verdy teammate Ryota Kajikawa set up "F-connect", which supports children in orphanages.

== Personal life ==
Koike's favourite football player is Kazuyoshi Miura. The two ended up playing together when Koike joined Yokohama FC. He later ended up assisting Miura against Júbilo Iwata to give Miura the record of oldest goalscorer in J League history.

== Club statistics ==
As of 20 April 2026

Appearances and goals by club, season and competition
Club	Season	League			National cup (Note: Includes Emperors Cup)		Total	
Club	Season	Division	Apps	Goals	Apps	Goals	Apps	Goals
Urawa Reds	2006	J.League Division 1	0	0	0	0	0	0
Urawa Reds	2007	J.League Division 1	4	0	1	0	5	0
Urawa Reds	Total		4	0	1	0	5	0
Thespa Kusatsu	2009	J.League Division 2	49	6	1	0	50	6
Mito HollyHock	2010	J.League Division 2	31	2	2	0	33	2
Mito HollyHock	2011	J.League Division 2	36	4	3	2	39	6
Mito HollyHock	Total		67	6	5	2	72	8
Tokyo Verdy	2012	J.League Division 2	23	3	2	0	25	3
Tokyo Verdy	2013	J.League Division 2	36	5	2	0	38	5
Tokyo Verdy	Total		59	8	4	0	63	8
Yokohama FC	2014	J.League Division 2	36	4	0	0	36	4
Yokohama FC	2015	J2 League	41	5	2	0	43	5
Yokohama FC	Total		77	9	2	0	79	9
JEF United Chiba	2016	J2 League	9	0	2	0	11	0
Ehime FC (loan)	2017	J2 League	32	0	0	0	32	0
Ehime FC	2018	J2 League	36	3	0	0	36	3
Tokyo Verdy	2019	J2 League	40	16	0	0	40	16
Tokyo Verdy	2020	J2 League	41	7	0	0	41	7
Tokyo Verdy	2021	J2 League	41	17	0	0	41	17
Tokyo Verdy	2022	J2 League	29	3	1	0	30	3
Tokyo Verdy	2023	J2 League	1	0	2	0	3	0
Tokyo Verdy	Total		152	43	3	0	155	43
Criacao Shinjuku	2024	JFL	16	1	–		16	1
Criacao Shinjuku	2025	JFL	10	0	–		10	0
Criacao Shinjuku	Total		26	1	0	0	26	1
Career total			511	76	18	2	529	78
