= Daisuke Yano =

Japanese footballer (born 1984)

Daisuke Yano 矢野 大輔
Personal information
- Full name: Daisuke Yano
- Date of birth: October 26, 1984 (age 42)
- Place of birth: Kikuyo, Kumamoto, Japan
- Height: 1.81 m (5 ft 11 1/2 in)
- Position: Defender

Youth career
- 2000–2002: Ozu High School

Senior career*
Years	Team	Apps	(Gls)
2003–2004	Gamba Osaka	0	(0)
2005–2006	Sagan Tosu	23	(1)
2006–2014	Roasso Kumamoto	250	(15)
Total		273	(16)
- * Club domestic league appearances and goals

Daisuke Yano (矢野 大輔, Yano Daisuke; born October 26, 1984) is a former Japanese football player.

== Career statistics ==
Appearances and goals by club, season and competition
Club	Season	League			Emperor's Cup		J.League Cup		Total	
Club	Season	Division	Apps	Goals	Apps	Goals	Apps	Goals	Apps	Goals
Gamba Osaka	2003	J1 League	0	0	0	0	0	0	0	0
Gamba Osaka	2004	J1 League	0	0	0	0	0	0	0	0
Sagan Tosu	2005	J2 League	20	1	2	0	-		22	1
Sagan Tosu	2006	J2 League	3	0	-		-		3	0
Rosso Kumamoto	2006	Football League	11	1	3	0	-		14	1
Rosso Kumamoto	2007	Football League	33	4	1	0	-		34	4
Roasso Kumamoto	2008	J2 League	36	1	1	0	-		37	1
Roasso Kumamoto	2009	J2 League	36	1	1	0	-		37	1
Roasso Kumamoto	2010	J2 League	32	2	1	0	-		33	3
Roasso Kumamoto	2011	J2 League	19	2	0	0	-		19	2
Roasso Kumamoto	2012	J2 League	28	2	2	0	-		30	2
Roasso Kumamoto	2013	J2 League	36	2	2	0	-		38	2
Roasso Kumamoto	2014	J2 League	19	0	0	0	-		19	0
Career total			273	16	13	0	0	0	286	16
