= Elizeu (footballer, born 1979) =

Brazilian footballer

Personal information
- Full name: Elizeu Ferreira Marciano
- Date of birth: 21 October 1979 (age 47)
- Place of birth: São Paulo, Brazil
- Height: 1.79 m (5 ft 10 in)
- Position: Defender

Senior career*
Years	Team	Apps	(Gls)
- Rio Branco
2002	Atlético Mineiro		
2003	Chongqing Lifan	7	(5)
2005	Comercial RP		
2005–2006	Joinville		
2007	Criciúma		
2008	Yokohama FC	37	(3)
2009–2010	Vegalta Sendai	70	(10)
2011–2012	Tokushima Vortis	36	(8)
2014	Linense	2	(0)
2014	Camboriú		
2015	Itumbiara	9	(0)
- * Club domestic league appearances and goals

Elizeu Ferreira Marciano (born 21 October 1979) is a Brazilian former football player.

== Club statistics ==
Club performance			League		Cup		League Cup		Total	
Season	Club	League	Apps	Goals	Apps	Goals	Apps	Goals	Apps	Goals
Japan			League		Emperor's Cup		J.League Cup		Total	
2008	Yokohama FC	J2 League	37	3	2	0	-		39	3
2009	Vegalta Sendai	J2 League	51	7	4	0	-		55	7
2010	Vegalta Sendai	J1 League	19	3	1	0	5	0	25	3
2011	Tokushima Vortis	J2 League								
Country	Japan		107	13	7	0	5	0	119	13
Total			107	13	7	0	5	0	119	13
