= Hironori Nishi =

Japanese footballer

Hironori Nishi 西 弘則
Personal information
- Full name: Hironori Nishi
- Date of birth: February 25, 1987 (age 39)
- Place of birth: Kumamoto, Japan
- Height: 1.68 m (5 ft 6 in)
- Position: Midfielder

Youth career
- 2005–2008: Ryutsu Keizai University FC

Senior career*
Years	Team	Apps	(Gls)
2009–2010	Roasso Kumamoto	78	(12)
2011–2015	Oita Trinita	150	(11)
2016–2019	Kamatamare Sanuki	110	(10)
- * Club domestic league appearances and goals as of 15 January 2020

Hironori Nishi (西 弘則, Nishi Hironori; born February 25, 1987) is a Japanese former football player.

== Career ==
After four seasons with Kamatamare Sanuki, Nishi retired at the end of the 2019 season.

== Career statistics ==
Updated to 5 January 2020.

Appearances and goals by club, season and competition
Club	Season	League			Emperor's Cup		League Cup		Other^{1}		Total	
Club	Season	Division	Apps	Goals	Apps	Goals	Apps	Goals	Apps	Goals	Apps	Goals
Roasso Kumamoto	2009	J2 League	43	8	1	0	-		-		44	8
Roasso Kumamoto	2010	J2 League	35	4	2	0	-		-		37	4
Oita Trinita	2011	J2 League	32	7	2	0	-		-		34	7
Oita Trinita	2012	J2 League	24	3	0	0	-		0	0	24	3
Oita Trinita	2013	J1 League	25	0	4	1	4	0	-		33	1
Oita Trinita	2014	J2 League	30	0	2	0	-		-		32	0
Oita Trinita	2015	J2 League	39	1	1	0	-		1	0	41	1
Kamatamare Sanuki	2016	J2 League	35	3	2	0	-		-		37	3
Kamatamare Sanuki	2017	J2 League	32	4	0	0	-		-		32	4
Kamatamare Sanuki	2018	J2 League	16	0	0	0	-		-		16	0
Kamatamare Sanuki	2019	J3 League	27	3	0	0	-		-		27	3
Career total			338	33	14	1	4	0	1	0	357	34

^{1}Includes Relegation Playoffs to J3.
