= Atsushi Ichimura =

Japanese footballer

Atsushi Ichimura 市村 篤司
Personal information
- Full name: Atsushi Ichimura
- Date of birth: November 18, 1984 (age 41)
- Place of birth: Eniwa, Hokkaido, Japan
- Height: 1.77 m (5 ft 9 1/2 in)
- Position: Defender

Youth career
- 2000–2002: Hokkai High School

Senior career*
Years	Team	Apps	(Gls)
2003–2004	Consadole Sapporo	39	(1)
2005–2012	Roasso Kumamoto	236	(11)
2013–2016	Yokohama FC	102	(3)
2017–2019	Kamatamare Sanuki	33	(0)
- * Club domestic league appearances and goals as of 10 January 2020

Atsushi Ichimura (市村 篤司, Ichimura Atsushi; born November 18, 1984) is a Japanese former football player who last played for Kamatamare Sanuki.

== Career ==
Ichimura retired at the end of the 2019 season.

== Club statistics ==
Updated to 23 February 2020.

Club performance			League		Cup		Total	
Season	Club	League	Apps	Goals	Apps	Goals	Apps	Goals
Japan			League		Emperor's Cup		Total	
2003	Consadole Sapporo	J2 League	5	0	3	1	8	1
2004	Consadole Sapporo	J2 League	34	1	0	0	34	1
2005	Rosso Kumamoto	JRL	10	1	1	0	11	1
2006	Rosso Kumamoto	JFL	32	2	3	0	35	2
2007	Rosso Kumamoto	JFL	31	1	1	0	32	1
2008	Roasso Kumamoto	J2 League	38	1	1	0	39	1
2009	Roasso Kumamoto	J2 League	48	2	1	0	49	2
2010	Roasso Kumamoto	J2 League	17	2	0	0	17	2
2011	Roasso Kumamoto	J2 League	35	1	1	0	36	1
2012	Roasso Kumamoto	J2 League	25	1	1	0	26	1
2013	Yokohama FC	J2 League	7	0	0	0	7	0
2014	Yokohama FC	J2 League	30	2	0	0	30	2
2015	Yokohama FC	J2 League	36	0	2	0	38	0
2016	Yokohama FC	J2 League	29	1	2	0	31	1
2017	Kamatamare Sanuki	J2 League	18	0	1	0	19	0
2018	Kamatamare Sanuki	J2 League	15	0	1	0	16	0
2019	Kamatamare Sanuki	J3 League	12	0	1	0	13	0
Total			422	15	19	1	441	16
