= Choi Kun-sik =

South Korean footballer (born 1981)

Choi Kun-Sik
Personal information
- Full name: Choi Kun-Sik
- Date of birth: 25 April 1981 (age 45)
- Place of birth: Gyeonggi-do, South Korea
- Height: 1.80 m (5 ft 11 in)
- Position: Forward

Youth career
- 2002–2005: Konkuk University

Senior career*
Years	Team	Apps	(Gls)
2006–2008	Daejeon Citizen	21	(0)
2009	Changwon City	7	(0)
2009–2011	Tochigi SC	58	(12)
2012	Roasso Kumamoto	17	(1)
2013	Rayong FC	-	(-)
- * Club domestic league appearances and goals as of 7 January 2013

- Choi Kun-sik
- Hangul: 최근식
- Hanja: 崔根植
- RR: Choe Geunsik
- MR: Ch'oe Kŭnsik

Choi Kun-Sik (Korean: 최근식; born 25 April 1981 in Gyeonggi-do) is a South Korean footballer. Position is forward.

== Club statistics ==
Club performance			League		Cup		League Cup		Total	
Season	Club	League	Apps	Goals	Apps	Goals	Apps	Goals	Apps	Goals
South Korea			League		KFA Cup		League Cup		Total	
2006	Daejeon Citizen	K-League	2	0	1	2	0	0	3	2
2007	Daejeon Citizen	K-League	7	0	0	0	2	0	9	0
2008	Daejeon Citizen	K-League	12	0	0	0	5	0	17	0
2009	Changwon City	Korea National League	7	0	0	0	-		7	0
Japan			League		Emperor's Cup		League Cup		Total	
2009	Tochigi SC	J2 League	17	0	0	0	-		17	0
2010	Tochigi SC	J2 League	30	8	1	1	-		31	9
2011	Tochigi SC	J2 League	27	4	2	1	-		29	5
2012	Roasso Kumamoto	J2 League	17	1	0	0	-		17	1
Total	South Korea		28	0	1	2	7	0	36	2
Total	Japan		91	13	3	2	-		94	15
Career total			119	13	4	4	7	0	130	17
