= Junki Goryo =

Japanese footballer

Junki Goryo 五領 淳樹
Personal information
- Full name: Junki Goryo
- Date of birth: December 13, 1989 (age 36)
- Place of birth: Kirishima, Kagoshima, Japan
- Height: 1.71 m (5 ft 7 1/2 in)
- Position: Midfielder

Team information
- Current team: Kagoshima United FC
- Number: 11

Youth career
- 2005–2007: Kamimura Gakuen High School

College career
| Years | Team | Apps | (Gls) |
| 2008–2011 | Miyazaki Sangyo-keiei University | | |

Senior career*
| Years | Team | Apps | (Gls) |
| 2012–2014 | Roasso Kumamoto | 37 | (2) |
| 2015– | Kagoshima United FC | 85 | (12) |
- * Club domestic league appearances and goals as of 5 January 2019

Junki Goryo (五領 淳樹, born December 13, 1989) is a Japanese football player for Kagoshima United FC.

== Club statistics ==
Updated to 23 February 2018.

| Club performance | | | League | | Cup | | Total | |
| Season | Club | League | Apps | Goals | Apps | Goals | Apps | Goals |
| Japan | | | League | | Emperor's Cup | | Total | |
|---|---|---|---|---|---|---|---|---|
| 2012 | Roasso Kumamoto | J2 League | 21 | 2 | 1 | 0 | 22 | 2 |
| 2013 | Roasso Kumamoto | J2 League | 7 | 0 | 1 | 0 | 8 | 0 |
| 2014 | Roasso Kumamoto | J2 League | 9 | 0 | 0 | 0 | 9 | 0 |
| 2015 | Kagoshima United FC | JFL | 27 | 4 | 0 | 0 | 27 | 4 |
| 2016 | Kagoshima United FC | J3 League | 24 | 2 | 0 | 0 | 24 | 2 |
| 2017 | Kagoshima United FC | J3 League | 21 | 4 | 0 | 0 | 21 | 4 |
| Total | | | 109 | 12 | 2 | 0 | 111 | 12 |
