= Takuma Abe =

Japanese footballer (born 1987)

Takuma Abe 阿部 拓馬
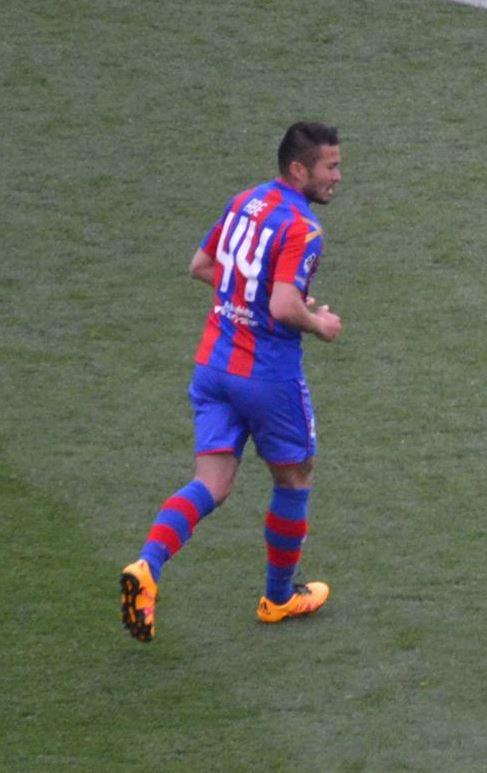
- Abe in 2016

Personal information
- Full name: Takuma Abe
- Date of birth: 5 December 1987 (age 38)
- Place of birth: Kodaira, Tokyo, Japan
- Height: 1.71 m (5 ft 7 in)
- Position: Striker

Youth career
- 2003–2005: Yokogawa Musashino

College career
Years	Team	Apps	(Gls)
2006–2010	Hosei University		

Senior career*
Years	Team	Apps	(Gls)
2010–2012	Tokyo Verdy	93	(37)
2013–2014	VfR Aalen	14	(2)
2014–2015	Ventforet Kofu	44	(6)
2016–2017	FC Tokyo	21	(1)
2017	Ulsan Hyundai	12	(1)
2018–2019	Vegalta Sendai	31	(2)
2020–2023	FC Ryukyu	105	(25)
2024	Yokogawa Musashino	16	(0)
Medal record
Vegalta Sendai
Runner-up	Emperor's Cup	2018
- * Club domestic league appearances and goals

Takuma Abe (阿部 拓馬, Abe Takuma; born on December 5, 1987) is a Japanese former footballer who played as a forward.

== Early life ==
Takuma was born in Kodaira.

== Career ==
=== Hosei ===
Abe played football for Hosei University after enrolling there in 2006.

=== Tokyo Verdy ===
Abe then joined J. League Division 2 side Tokyo Verdy on a free transfer in January 2010. He made his league debut on April 10, 2010 in Verdy's 1–0 loss to Ehime, coming on at half time.

=== VfR Aalen ===
After three seasons at Tokyo Verdy, Abe joined 2. Bundesliga side VfR Aalen in January 2013. He made his league debut on February 16, 2013 coming on as a 65th-minute substitute in Aalen's 1–0 loss to Hertha BSC. He scored his first goal for the club on March 17, 2013 in the 90th minute to draw the game 2–2 against SV Sandhausen.

=== Ventforet Kofu ===
Takuma made his debut for Ventforet on July 19, 2014. He scored his first goal for the club in the 26th minute against Kawasaki Frontale.

=== FC Tokyo ===
Takuma made his debut for Tokyo against Omiya Ardija on February 27, 2016. He scored his first goal for the club against Vissel Kobe on the March 11, 2016.

=== Ulsan Hyundai ===
Takuma made his debut for Ulsan against Gwangju FC on the July 15, 2017. He scored his first goal for the club in the 58th minute against Daegu FC.

=== Vegalta Sendai ===
Takuma made his debut for Vegalta against Kashiwa Reysol on February 25, 2018. He scored his first goal for the club against Shimizu S-Pulse on March 18, 2018.

=== Ryukyu ===
Takuma made his debut against JEF United on February 23, 2020. He scored his first goal for the club in the 32nd minute against Avispa Fukuoka.

== Career statistics ==
As of February 18, 2019

Appearances and goals by club, season and competition
Club	Season	League		National cup (Note: Includes Emperor's Cup and DFB-Pokal.)		League cup (Note: Includes J. League Cup..)		Continental (Note: Includes AFC Champions League..)		Total	
Club	Season	Apps	Goals	Apps	Goals	Apps	Goals	Apps	Goals	Apps	Goals
Tokyo Verdy	2010	20	3	1	0	–		–		21	3
Tokyo Verdy	2011	33	16	2	2	–		–		35	18
Tokyo Verdy	2012	40	18	1	0	–		–		41	18
VfR Aalen	2012–13	9	2	0	0	–		–		9	2
VfR Aalen	2013–14	4	0	1	0	–		–		5	0
Ventforet Kofu	2014	14	1	0	0	–		–		14	1
Ventforet Kofu	2015	30	5	2	2	2	1	–		34	8
FC Tokyo	2016	11	1	1	0	0	0	9	2	21	3
FC Tokyo	2017	10	0	1	0	7	3	–		18	3
Ulsan Hyundai FC	2017	12	1	3	0	–		–		15	1
Vegalta Sendai	2018	24	2	4	0	3	0	–		31	2
Career total		207	49	16	4	12	4	9	2	244	59
