= Kim Jong-min (footballer, born 1992) =

South Korean footballer

Personal information
- Date of birth: August 11, 1992 (age 34)
- Place of birth: South Korea
- Height: 1.88 m (6 ft 2 in)
- Position: Striker

Team information
- Current team: Chungnam Asan
- Number: 9

Senior career*
Years	Team	Apps	(Gls)
2011–2015	Tokushima Vortis	96	(12)
2016–2017	Suwon Samsung Bluewings	12	(1)
2017	Fagiano Okayama	2	(0)
2018	Suwon Samsung Bluewings	7	(1)
2019	FC Gangneung	14	(5)
2020–2021	Pocheon Citizen	33	(18)
2022	Iwate Grulla Morioka	8	(0)
2023	Cheonan City	25	(1)
2024	Jeonnam Dragons	23	(12)
2025–	Chungnam Asan	44	(13)
- * Club domestic league appearances and goals as of 6 August 2026

- Kim Jong-min
- Hangul: 김종민
- Hanja: 金宗旻
- RR: Gim Jongmin
- MR: Kim Chongmin

Kim Jong-min (Korean: 김종민; born August 11, 1992) is a South Korean footballer who plays for Chungnam Asan in the K League 2, as a striker.

== Career ==
Kim signed for Tokushima in January 2011. He made his J.League debut on 26 October 2011, against Consadole Sapporo at Pocarisweat Stadium, coming on as a second-half substitute. He scored his first J.League goal for Tokushima against Giravanz Kitakyushu on 4 March 2012.

== Career statistics ==
As of match played 24 August 2025.

Club	Season	League			Cup		League Cup		Continental		Other		Total	
Club	Season	Division	Apps	Goals	Apps	Goals	Apps	Goals	Apps	Goals	Apps	Goals	Apps	Goals
Tokushima Vortis	2011	J. League Division 2	1	0	1	0	—		—		—		2	0
Tokushima Vortis	2012	J. League Division 2	25	3	1	0	—		—		—		26	3
Tokushima Vortis	2013	J. League Division 2	30	4	1	0	—		—		0	0	31	4
Tokushima Vortis	2014	J. League Division 1	17	0	1	0	5	1	—		—		23	1
Tokushima Vortis	2015	J. League Division 2	23	5	4	0	—		—		—		27	5
Tokushima Vortis	Total		96	12	8	0	5	1	—		0	0	109	13
Suwon Samsung Bluewings	2016	K League Classic	11	1	0	0	—		2	0	—		13	1
Suwon Samsung Bluewings	2017	K League Classic	1	0	1	0	—		0	0	—		2	0
Suwon Samsung Bluewings	Total		12	1	1	0	—		2	0	—		15	1
Fagiano Okayama	2017	J2 League	2	0	0	0	—		—		—		2	0
Suwon Samsung Bluewings	2018	K League 1	7	1	0	0	—		1	0	—		8	1
FC Gangneung	2019	Korea National League	14	5	1	1	—		—		4	3	19	9
Pocheon Citizen	2020	K4 League	13	3	1	0	—		—		0	0	14	3
Pocheon Citizen	2021	K4 League	20	15	0	0	—		—		—		20	15
Pocheon Citizen	Total		33	18	1	0	—		—		0	0	34	18
Iwate Grulla Morioka	2022	J2 League	8	0	1	0	—		—		—		9	0
Cheonan City	2023	K League 2	25	1	1	2	—		—		—		26	3
Jeonnam Dragons	2024	K League 2	23	12	1	0	—		—		1	0	25	12
Chungnam Asan	2025	K League 2	25	7	0	0	—		—		—		25	7
Career total			245	57	14	3	5	1	3	0	5	3	272	64
