= Shosuke Katayama =

Japanese footballer

Shosuke Katayama 片山 奨典
Personal information
- Full name: Shosuke Katayama
- Date of birth: 8 September 1983 (age 43)
- Place of birth: Nara, Japan
- Height: 1.69 m (5 ft 7 in)
- Position: Defender

Youth career
- 2002–2005: Kokushikan University

Senior career*
Years	Team	Apps	(Gls)
2006–2008	Nagoya Grampus	25	(1)
2009–2010	Yokohama FC	53	(0)
2010–2019	Roasso Kumamoto	256	(9)
- * Club domestic league appearances and goals as of 10 January 2020

Shosuke Katayama (片山 奨典, Katayama Shosuke; born 8 September 1983) is a Japanese former footballer who last played for Roasso Kumamoto.

== Career ==
Katayama retired at the end of the 2019 season.

== Career statistics ==
Updated to 23 February 2017.

Appearances and goals by club, season and competition
Club	Season	League			Emperor's Cup		J.League Cup		Total	
Club	Season	Division	Apps	Goals	Apps	Goals	Apps	Goals	Apps	Goals
Kokushikan University SC	2002	JFL	4	0	1	0	—		5	0
Kokushikan University SC	2003	JFL	3	0	—		—		3	0
Kokushikan University SC	2004	JFL	5	0	—		—		5	0
Nagoya Grampus	2006	J1 League	9	0	0	0	3	0	12	0
Nagoya Grampus	2007	J1 League	15	1	1	0	5	1	21	2
Nagoya Grampus	2008	J1 League	1	0	0	0	1	0	2	0
Yokohama FC	2009	J2 League	46	0	2	0	—		48	0
Yokohama FC	2010	J2 League	7	0	0	0	—		7	0
Roasso Kumamoto	2010	J2 League	15	3	2	0	—		17	3
Roasso Kumamoto	2011	J2 League	31	1	1	0	—		32	1
Roasso Kumamoto	2012	J2 League	40	2	3	0	—		43	2
Roasso Kumamoto	2013	J2 League	40	2	1	0	—		41	2
Roasso Kumamoto	2014	J2 League	36	1	1	0	—		37	1
Roasso Kumamoto	2015	J2 League	11	0	0	0	—		11	0
Roasso Kumamoto	2016	J2 League	25	0	1	0	—		26	0
Career total			276	10	13	0	9	1	298	11
