= Diogo Oliveira (footballer, born 1983) =

Brazilian footballer (1983–2021)

Personal information
- Full name: Diogo Correa de Oliveira
- Date of birth: 8 April 1983
- Place of birth: São Bernardo do Campo, Brazil
- Date of death: 9 June 2021 (aged 38)
- Place of death: Maringá, Brazil
- Height: 1.87 m (6 ft 2 in)
- Position: Forward

Youth career
- 1998–2001: Santos

Senior career*
Years	Team	Apps	(Gls)
2002	Jabaquara		
2003	Rio Branco-SP		
2003	América-RN		
2004	Flamengo	24	(6)
2004–2005	Kalmar FF	9	(4)
2005	Juventude		
2005–2006	Al-Jazira		
2006–2007	IFK Norrköping		
2007	Adap Galo Maringá		
2007–2008	Boavista-RJ		
2008	Brasiliense FC		
2009	ABC		
2009	Brusque		
2009–2010	São Bernardo	2	(0)
2010	América T.O.	5	(1)
2011	Arapongas		
2011	Consadole Sapporo	15	(3)
2012	Tokushima Vortis	26	(3)
2013	Horizonte	8	(0)
2014	Boavista	7	(0)
2015	Nacional-PR	7	(1)
- * Club domestic league appearances and goals

Diogo Correa de Oliveira, or simply Diogo (8 April 1983 – 9 June 2021), was a Brazilian professional footballer who played as a forward for clubs in countries like Brazil, Sweden, Japan and Libya.

== Death ==
Diogo died on 9 June 2021, when his motorcycle collided with a lamppost in Maringá, Paraná state, Brazil. He died due to injuries sustained to his head.
