= Kosuke Yoshii =

Japanese footballer

Kosuke Yoshii 吉井 孝輔
Personal information
- Full name: Kosuke Yoshii
- Date of birth: March 19, 1986 (age 40)
- Place of birth: Aira, Kagoshima, Japan
- Height: 1.74 m (5 ft 8 1/2 in)
- Position: Midfielder

Youth career
- 2001–2003: Kagoshima Josei High School

Senior career*
Years	Team	Apps	(Gls)
2004–2006	Shonan Bellmare	7	(0)
2006–2014	Roasso Kumamoto	209	(11)
2016–2019	Kagoshima United	66	(7)
- * Club domestic league appearances and goals

Kosuke Yoshii (吉井 孝輔, Yoshii Kōsuke; born March 19, 1986) is a Japanese retired football player.

== Club statistics ==
Updated to 23 February 2019.

Club performance			League		Cup		Total	
Season	Club	League	Apps	Goals	Apps	Goals	Apps	Goals
Japan			League		Emperor's Cup		Total	
2004	Shonan Bellmare	J2 League	5	0	0	0	5	0
2005	Shonan Bellmare	J2 League	0	0	0	0	0	0
2006	Shonan Bellmare	J2 League	2	0	0	0	2	0
2006	Rosso Kumamoto	JFL	4	0	0	0	4	0
2007	Rosso Kumamoto	JFL	26	2	1	0	27	2
2008	Roasso Kumamoto	J2 League	29	1	0	0	29	1
2009	Roasso Kumamoto	J2 League	29	5	1	1	30	6
2010	Roasso Kumamoto	J2 League	35	0	1	0	36	0
2011	Roasso Kumamoto	J2 League	20	1	0	0	20	1
2012	Roasso Kumamoto	J2 League	29	1	2	0	31	1
2013	Roasso Kumamoto	J2 League	34	1	1	0	35	1
2014	Roasso Kumamoto	J2 League	3	0	0	0	3	0
2016	Kagoshima United FC	J3 League	15	1	0	0	15	1
2017	Kagoshima United FC	J3 League	17	1	1	0	18	1
2018	Kagoshima United FC	J3 League	30	5	0	0	30	5
Career total			278	18	7	1	285	19
