= 2011 J.League Division 2 =

J.League Division 2
- Season: 2011
- Champions: FC Tokyo; 1st J2 title 2nd D2 title
- Promoted: FC Tokyo; Sagan Tosu; Consadole Sapporo
- Matches: 380
- Goals: 939 (2.47 per match)
- Top goalscorer: Yohei Toyoda (23 goals)
- Highest attendance: 39,243; Consadole vs FC Tokyo
- Lowest attendance: 1,266; Thespa vs Vortis
- Average attendance: 6,423

The 2011 J.League Division 2 season was the 40th season of the second-tier club football in Japan and the 13th season since the establishment of J2 League. The season began on March 5 and finished on December 3. Due to the aftermath of the 2011 Tōhoku earthquake and tsunami, the season was put on hold from March 12 to April 23.

FC Tokyo won the tournament and returned to J1 immediately after being relegated the previous season. By virtue of winning the 2011 Emperor's Cup final, they earned a berth in the 2012 AFC Champions League as well. Sagan Tosu and Consadole Sapporo finished second and third, respectively, and also won the promotion. Consadole are returning to the top flight after three years of absence, while for Tosu this is the first promotion in their history.

Sagan became the last of original ten J2 teams to reach J1, passing the moniker of the longest-staying D2 dweller to Mito HollyHock.

== Teams ==
As in the previous seasons, the size of the league was increased by one team to twenty overall. Gainare Tottori as 2010 Japan Football League champions were promoted.

Kashiwa Reysol as champions of the 2010 season, runners-up Ventforet Kofu and third-placed team Avispa Fukuoka were promoted to the 2011 J.League Division 1. Kashiwa made their immediate return to the top division, while Kofu and Fukuoka ended three- and four-year tenures in the J2. The three teams were replaced by FC Tokyo, Kyoto Sanga FC and Shonan Bellmare, who were relegated at the end of the 2010 J.League Division 1 season after finishing in the bottom three places of the table. Shonan only made a cameo appearance at the D1, Kyoto re-entered the second level of the Japanese league pyramid after three years, and Tokyo eventually had to return to the J2 for the first time after eleven seasons.

Locations of the 2011 J.League 2 teams

Club name	Home town(s)	Note(s)
Consadole Sapporo	Sapporo, Hokkaidō	
Ehime FC	All cities/towns in Ehime	
Fagiano Okayama	All cities/towns in Okayama	
Gainare Tottori	All cities/towns in Tottori	Promoted from JFL in 2010
FC Gifu	All cities/towns in Gifu	
Giravanz Kitakyushu	Kitakyushu, Fukuoka	
JEF United Chiba	Chiba & Ichihara, Chiba	
Kataller Toyama	All cities/towns in Toyama	
Kyoto Sanga FC	Southwestern cities/towns in Kyoto	Relegated from J1 League in 2010
Mito HollyHock	Mito, Ibaraki	
Oita Trinita	All cities/towns in Ōita	
Roasso Kumamoto	Kumamoto	
Sagan Tosu	Tosu, Saga	
Shonan Bellmare	Southcentral cities/town in Kanagawa	Relegated from J1 League in 2010
Thespa Kusatsu	All cities/towns in Gunma	
Tochigi SC	Utsunomiya, Tochigi	
Tokushima Vortis	All cities/towns in Tokushima	
FC Tokyo	Tokyo	Relegated from J1 League in 2010
Tokyo Verdy	Tokyo	
Yokohama FC	Yokohama, Kanagawa	

== Foreign players ==
Club	Player 1	Player 2	Player 3	AFC player	Type-C contract	Non-visa foreign	Former players
Consadole Sapporo	(Brazil) Bruno Ferraz	(Brazil) Daniel Lemos	(Brazil) Diogo Oliveira	(South Korea) Lee Ho-seung			(Brazil) Andrezinho (Brazil) Tiago Prado
Ehime FC	(Brazil) Josimar			(South Korea) Kim Shin-young			
Fagiano Okayama	(Brazil) Tiago	(Bulgaria) Ilian Stoyanov		(South Korea) Kim Min-kyun		(South Korea) Lee Chang-gang	
FC Gifu	(Brazil) Bruno	(Brazil) Rafael Almeida				(Brazil) Efrain Rintaro (North Korea) Ri Han-jae	
FC Tokyo	(Brazil) Lucas Severino	(Brazil) Roberto	(Brazil) Roberto César	(Australia) Jade North			(Brazil) Pedro Júnior
Gainare Tottori	(Ivory Coast) Hamed Koné	(South Korea) Jeong Dong-ho		(South Korea) Kim Sun-min			(Brazil) Dodô
Giravanz Kitakyushu				(South Korea) Kim Jong-pil	(South Korea) Oh Seung-rok	(Brazil) Leonardo Moreira	(South Korea) Kim Soo-yeon
JEF United Chiba	(Canada) Matt Lam	(Netherlands) Sander van Gessel	(Norway) Tor Hogne Aarøy	(Australia) Mark Milligan		(South Korea) Ryu Myeong-gi	
Kataller Toyama	(South Korea) Seo Yong-duk						
Kyoto Sanga	(Brazil) Alair	(Brazil) Junior Dutra		(South Korea) Jung Woo-young		(North Korea) Kim Song-yong	(Brazil) Diego Souza
Mito HollyHock							(South Korea) Lee Kang
Oita Trinita	(South Korea) Choi Jung-han			(South Korea) Lee Dong-myung		(North Korea) Kang Song-ho	
Roasso Kumamoto	(Brazil) Edmilson Alves	(Brazil) Fábio Pena	(Brazil) Ivan Paraná	(South Korea) Jo Sung-jin	(South Korea) Song In-young		
Sagan Tosu	(South Korea) Kim Byung-suk	(South Korea) Kim Min-woo		(South Korea) Yeo Sung-hae		(South Korea) Kim Myung-hwi	
Shonan Bellmare	(Brazil) Adiel	(South Korea) Han Kook-young	(South Korea) Hwang Soon-min	(South Korea) Song Han-ki	(Brazil) Lucão do Break	(South Korea) Kim Yeong-gi	(South Korea) Choi Seung-in
Thespa Kusatsu	(Brazil) Alex Henrique	(Brazil) Lincoln					(Brazil) Rafinha
Tochigi SC	(Brazil) Paulinho	(Brazil) Ricardo Lobo	(Brazil) Sabia	(South Korea) Choi Kun-sik			(Argentina) Mariano Trípodi
Tokushima Vortis	(Brazil) Douglas	(Brazil) Elizeu	(South Korea) Bae Seung-jin	(South Korea) Oh Seung-hoon	(South Korea) Kim Jong-min		
Tokyo Verdy	(Brazil) Apodi	(Brazil) Maranhão					(South Korea) Kim Tae-yeon
Yokohama FC	(Brazil) Eder	(Brazil) França	(Brazil) Kaio	(South Korea) Park Tae-hong			(Brazil) Fabinho

== League table ==
Pos	Team	Pld	W	D	L	GF	GA	GD	Pts	Promotion or relegation
1	FC Tokyo (C, P)	38	23	8	7	67	22	+45	77	Promotion to 2012 J.League Division 1 and Qualification to 2012 Champions League (Note: FC Tokyo, as winners of the 2011 Emperor's Cup, also qualified for the group stage of the 2012 AFC Champions League)
2	Sagan Tosu (P)	38	19	12	7	68	34	+34	69	Promotion to 2012 J.League Division 1
3	Consadole Sapporo (P)	38	21	5	12	49	32	+17	68	Promotion to 2012 J.League Division 1
4	Tokushima Vortis	38	19	8	11	51	38	+13	65	
5	Tokyo Verdy	38	16	11	11	69	45	+24	59	
6	JEF United Chiba	38	16	10	12	46	39	+7	58	
7	Kyoto Sanga	38	17	7	14	50	45	+5	58	
8	Giravanz Kitakyushu	38	16	10	12	45	46	−1	58	
9	Thespa Kusatsu	38	16	9	13	51	51	0	57	
10	Tochigi SC	38	15	11	12	44	39	+5	56	
11	Roasso Kumamoto	38	13	12	13	33	44	−11	51	
12	Oita Trinita	38	12	14	12	42	45	−3	50	
13	Fagiano Okayama	38	13	9	16	43	58	−15	48	
14	Shonan Bellmare	38	12	10	16	46	48	−2	46	
15	Ehime FC	38	10	14	14	44	54	−10	44	
16	Kataller Toyama	38	11	10	17	36	53	−17	43	
17	Mito HollyHock	38	11	9	18	40	49	−9	42	
18	Yokohama FC	38	11	8	19	40	54	−14	41	
19	Gainare Tottori	38	8	7	23	36	60	−24	31	
20	FC Gifu	38	6	6	26	39	83	−44	24	

Updated to match(es) played on December 3, 2011. Source: J.League Division 2
Rules for classification: 1st points; 2nd goal differential; 3rd goals scored; 4th head-to-head results; 5th disciplinary points; 6th draw. If two clubs are tied for first place, both clubs will be declared champions.
(C) Champions; (P) Promoted

== Results ==
Home \ Away	BEL	CON	EHI	FAG	GAI	GIF	GIR	HOL	JEF	KAT	ROS	SAG	SAN	SPA	TOC	TOK	TRI	VER	VOR	YFC
Shonan Bellmare		0–2	1–1	5–0	0–1	7–1	1–1	3–2	2–0	2–0	1–0	1–0	0–1	2–0	0–2	1–2	2–2	1–3	1–2	0–1
Consadole Sapporo	0–1		3–1	2–1	2–0	1–0	0–0	2–1	4–0	0–0	3–0	0–1	2–1	1–0	1–0	2–1	2–0	4–2	0–0	0–2
Ehime FC	0–0	2–0		2–3	3–2	2–0	0–3	0–1	0–1	1–0	1–1	2–2	0–2	1–2	2–2	0–5	1–1	2–1	0–1	0–0
Fagiano Okayama	1–1	1–0	1–1		2–1	1–2	3–0	0–1	0–1	1–1	4–0	2–4	2–1	1–2	2–2	0–2	0–0	0–4	1–0	1–0
Gainare Tottori	4–0	1–0	2–4	1–1		1–1	0–1	1–1	0–1	0–0	0–1	3–6	2–1	1–1	0–5	1–5	0–0	0–1	0–2	0–1
FC Gifu	0–1	1–3	1–1	1–3	2–3		1–3	2–1	0–2	1–1	1–1	4–4	3–2	0–1	0–1	0–2	0–1	1–3	0–2	4–3
Giravanz Kitakyushu	0–0	0–3	2–2	1–2	0–2	3–2		1–0	0–3	2–1	2–0	0–0	1–0	2–1	2–1	1–0	3–1	1–2	1–1	2–2
Mito HollyHock	0–0	1–2	3–1	1–1	3–1	1–2	1–0		1–0	3–0	0–0	0–5	2–1	2–2	0–1	2–3	0–2	1–1	2–1	0–1
JEF United Chiba	2–0	2–0	2–1	2–1	1–0	3–1	1–0	2–1		0–0	1–1	3–3	0–1	2–3	2–2	3–0	3–2	1–1	0–1	1–1
Kataller Toyama	2–3	1–2	2–1	0–2	4–2	1–0	1–2	2–0	1–2		1–1	0–3	1–1	2–3	1–3	1–0	1–0	1–5	0–2	0–2
Roasso Kumamoto	1–1	1–0	2–1	1–0	2–0	2–1	0–0	2–1	1–1	1–1		0–0	1–2	1–0	0–1	0–1	2–1	1–0	0–1	0–1
Sagan Tosu	2–0	1–0	1–2	6–0	1–0	2–0	2–3	2–1	1–0	0–1	2–2		2–1	1–2	1–2	0–0	2–1	3–1	1–1	2–0
Kyoto Sanga	1–0	4–0	0–0	2–1	1–0	3–1	1–0	0–2	2–1	0–0	0–1	0–0		3–1	1–1	1–4	2–0	1–0	1–2	1–1
Thespa Kusatsu	1–0	2–1	0–0	1–2	0–5	4–2	2–2	1–2	3–1	0–0	1–0	0–0	2–4		4–0	2–1	1–1	0–0	2–0	1–1
Tochigi SC	0–3	1–1	1–2	0–0	1–0	0–1	2–1	0–0	0–0	1–2	0–1	0–0	1–0	2–1		2–1	2–1	2–4	0–1	2–1
FC Tokyo	1–1	0–0	1–1	3–0	3–0	4–0	2–0	2–0	1–0	1–0	5–0	1–0	6–1	1–0	0–0		1–2	1–1	1–0	3–0
Oita Trinita	3–1	0–1	2–1	1–0	2–1	2–1	2–2	0–0	1–1	1–2	2–2	0–0	1–3	1–2	1–0	0–0		0–0	2–2	1–0
Tokyo Verdy	2–2	2–1	1–2	4–0	0–0	3–0	4–0	3–2	1–0	1–2	5–2	0–2	1–1	1–3	0–0	0–0	1–2		1–0	7–2
Tokushima Vortis	4–0	0–2	2–2	2–2	1–0	4–1	0–1	1–1	1–0	3–1	1–0	0–3	2–1	3–0	0–4	0–2	1–2	2–2		4–1
Yokohama FC	3–2	1–2	0–1	0–1	0–1	1–1	1–2	1–0	1–1	1–2	1–2	1–2	1–2	2–0	2–0	0–1	2–2	2–1	0–1	

Updated to match(es) played on December 3, 2011. Source: J. League Division 2
Legend: Blue = home team win; Yellow = draw; Red = away team win.

== Top scorers ==
Rank	Scorer	Club	Goals
1	(Japan) Yohei Toyoda	Sagan Tosu	23
2	(Japan) Takuma Abe	Tokyo Verdy	16
3	(Japan) Masaki Fukai	JEF United Chiba	14
3	(Japan) Manabu Saitō	Ehime FC	14
5	(Brazil) Ricardo Lobo	Tochigi SC	12
5	(Japan) Yoshihiro Uchimura	Consadole Sapporo	12
7	(Japan) Yasuhito Morishima	Oita Trinita	11
8	(Brazil) Roberto César	FC Tokyo	10
8	(Japan) Ryota Hayasaka	Sagan Tosu	10
8	(Japan) Tomoki Ikemoto	Giravanz Kitakyushu	10
8	(Japan) Yuya Kubo	Kyoto Sanga	10

== Attendance ==
Pos	Team	Total	High	Low	Average	Change
1	FC Tokyo	333,680	35,911	6,795	17,562	−30.1%^{†}
2	Consadole Sapporo	199,162	39,243	4,609	10,482	−2.4%
3	JEF United Chiba	183,911	16,360	6,955	9,680	−17.2%
4	Oita Trinita	166,807	27,519	4,859	8,779	−16.1%
5	Sagan Tosu	146,893	22,532	3,724	7,731	+16.6%
6	Fagiano Okayama	137,911	10,490	4,111	7,258	+1.4%
7	Shonan Bellmare	131,918	10,425	3,680	6,943	−37.4%^{†}
8	Roasso Kumamoto	131,624	25,005	2,847	6,928	+0.3%
9	Kyoto Sanga	119,591	12,287	2,386	6,294	−40.1%^{†}
10	Yokohama FC	109,632	16,813	1,853	5,770	−0.4%
11	Tokyo Verdy	108,482	28,832	2,164	5,710	+1.3%
12	Tokushima Vortis	98,925	11,916	2,165	5,207	+12.9%
13	Tochigi SC	93,848	9,953	2,493	4,939	+18.8%
14	FC Gifu	78,273	6,684	2,150	4,120	+32.6%
15	Giravanz Kitakyushu	76,976	7,080	1,336	4,051	−3.3%
16	Gainare Tottori	70,152	8,212	1,787	3,692	+5.8%^{‡}
17	Ehime FC	66,022	7,634	1,563	3,475	−20.8%
18	Mito HollyHock	63,637	5,227	1,273	3,349	−7.2%
19	Kataller Toyama	62,233	8,663	1,716	3,275	−26.6%
20	Thespa Kusatsu	61,018	6,520	1,266	3,211	−27.4%
	League total	2,440,695	39,243	1,266	6,423	−4.1%

Updated to games played on December 3, 2011
Source: J. League Division 2
Notes:
^{†} Team played previous season in J1.
^{‡} Team played previous season in JFL.
