= 2009 Kyoto Sanga FC season =

Kyoto Sanga F.C.
2009 season
- Manager: Hisashi Kato
- Stadium: Nishikyogoku Athletic Stadium
- J. League 1: 12th
- Emperor's Cup: 3rd Round
- J. League Cup: GL-B 7th
- Top goalscorer: Diego (9)
Home colours	Away colours

2009 Kyoto Sanga F.C. season

== Competitions ==
Competitions	Position
J. League 1	12th / 18 clubs
Emperor's Cup	3rd Round
J. League Cup	GL-B 7th / 7 clubs

== Player statistics ==
No.	Pos.	Player	D.o.B. (Age)	Height / Weight	J. League 1		Emperor's Cup		J. League Cup		Total	
No.	Pos.	Player	D.o.B. (Age)	Height / Weight	Apps	Goals	Apps	Goals	Apps	Goals	Apps	Goals
1	GK	Naohito Hirai	July 16, 1978 (aged 30)	cm / kg	0	0						
2	DF	Yasumasa Nishino	September 14, 1982 (aged 26)	cm / kg	0	0						
3	DF	Sidiclei	May 13, 1972 (aged 36)	cm / kg	20	0						
4	DF	Hiroki Mizumoto	September 12, 1985 (aged 23)	cm / kg	33	2						
5	DF	Kazuki Teshima	June 7, 1979 (aged 29)	cm / kg	0	0						
6	DF	Yuta Someya	September 30, 1986 (aged 22)	cm / kg	19	1						
7	MF	Yūto Satō	March 12, 1982 (aged 26)	cm / kg	28	0						
8	DF	Yusuke Nakatani	September 22, 1978 (aged 30)	cm / kg	22	0						
9	FW	Yohei Toyoda	April 11, 1985 (aged 23)	cm / kg	21	1						
10	MF	Diego Souza	March 22, 1984 (aged 24)	cm / kg	33	9						
11	FW	Takenori Hayashi	October 14, 1980 (aged 28)	cm / kg	29	1						
13	FW	Atsushi Yanagisawa	May 27, 1977 (aged 31)	cm / kg	22	4						
14	DF	Lee Jung-Soo	January 8, 1980 (aged 29)	cm / kg	32	5						
15	MF	Hiroki Nakayama	December 13, 1985 (aged 23)	cm / kg	8	1						
16	MF	Jun Ando	October 8, 1984 (aged 24)	cm / kg	32	1						
17	MF	Taisuke Nakamura	July 19, 1989 (aged 19)	cm / kg	5	0						
18	MF	Koken Kato	April 3, 1989 (aged 19)	cm / kg	8	1						
19	DF	Shun Morishita	May 11, 1986 (aged 22)	cm / kg	9	0						
20	FW	Paulinho	July 16, 1982 (aged 26)	cm / kg	17	5						
21	GK	Yuichi Mizutani	May 26, 1980 (aged 28)	cm / kg	34	0						
22	MF	Daigo Watanabe	December 3, 1984 (aged 24)	cm / kg	20	2						
23	FW	Asutaka Nakamura	September 13, 1990 (aged 18)	cm / kg	3	0						
24	DF	Tatsuya Masushima	April 22, 1985 (aged 23)	cm / kg	21	0						
26	DF	Makoto Kakuda	July 10, 1983 (aged 25)	cm / kg	29	0						
27	FW	Takumi Uesato	April 29, 1990 (aged 18)	cm / kg	2	0						
28	FW	Kim Seong-Yong	February 26, 1987 (aged 22)	cm / kg	16	2						
29	GK	Tatsuya Morita	August 3, 1990 (aged 18)	cm / kg	0	0						
30	GK	Kenya Matsui	September 10, 1985 (aged 23)	cm / kg	1	0						
31	FW	Takumi Miyayoshi	August 7, 1992 (aged 16)	cm / kg	2	0						

== Other pages ==
- (in Japanese) J. League official site
