= 2010 Kyoto Sanga FC season =

Kyoto Sanga F.C.
2010 season
- Manager: Hisashi Kato; Yutaka Akita
- Stadium: Nishikyogoku Athletic Stadium
- J. League 1: 17th
- Emperor's Cup: 3rd Round
- J. League Cup: GL-A 3rd
- Top goalscorer: Diego (6)
Home colours	Away colours

The 2010 Kyoto Sanga F.C. season was the 11th season of the club in J. League Division 1.

== Competitions ==
Competitions	Position
J. League 1	17th / 18 clubs
Emperor's Cup	3rd Round
J. League Cup	GL-A 3rd / 7 clubs

=== J. League 1 ===
Pos	Team	Pld	W	D	L	GF	GA	GD	Pts	Qualification or relegation
14	Vegalta Sendai	34	10	9	15	40	46	−6	39	
15	Vissel Kobe	34	9	11	14	37	45	−8	38	
16	FC Tokyo (R)	34	8	12	14	36	41	−5	36	Relegation to 2011 J.League Division 2
17	Kyoto Sanga (R)	34	4	7	23	30	60	−30	19	Relegation to 2011 J.League Division 2
18	Shonan Bellmare (R)	34	3	7	24	31	82	−51	16	Relegation to 2011 J.League Division 2

Updated to match(es) played on December 4, 2010. Source: J.League Division 1
Rules for classification: 1) points; 2) goal difference; 3) number of goals scored.
(R) Relegated

== Player statistics ==
No.	Pos.	Player	D.o.B. (Age)	Height / Weight	J. League 1		Emperor's Cup		J. League Cup		Total	
No.	Pos.	Player	D.o.B. (Age)	Height / Weight	Apps	Goals	Apps	Goals	Apps	Goals	Apps	Goals
1	GK	Naohito Hirai	July 16, 1978 (aged 31)	cm / kg	5	0						
2	DF	Yasumasa Nishino	September 14, 1982 (aged 27)	cm / kg	10	0						
3	DF	Thiego	July 22, 1986 (aged 23)	cm / kg	10	0						
4	DF	Hiroki Mizumoto	September 12, 1985 (aged 24)	cm / kg	34	0						
5	DF	Kwak Tae-Hwi	July 8, 1981 (aged 28)	cm / kg	24	2						
6	DF	Yuta Someya	September 30, 1986 (aged 23)	cm / kg	10	0						
7	MF	Yosuke Kataoka	May 26, 1982 (aged 27)	cm / kg	9	0						
8	DF	Yusuke Nakatani	September 22, 1978 (aged 31)	cm / kg	5	0						
9	FW	Dutra	April 25, 1988 (aged 21)	cm / kg	26	5						
10	MF	Diego Souza	March 22, 1984 (aged 25)	cm / kg	33	6						
11	MF	Shingo Suzuki	March 20, 1978 (aged 31)	cm / kg	3	0						
13	FW	Atsushi Yanagisawa	May 27, 1977 (aged 32)	cm / kg	31	3						
14	FW	Dan Howbert	July 29, 1987 (aged 22)	cm / kg	4	0						
15	MF	Hiroki Nakayama	December 13, 1985 (aged 24)	cm / kg	29	1						
16	MF	Jun Ando	October 8, 1984 (aged 25)	cm / kg	26	1						
17	MF	Taisuke Nakamura	July 19, 1989 (aged 20)	cm / kg	26	1						
18	MF	Koken Kato	April 3, 1989 (aged 20)	cm / kg	10	0						
19	DF	Shun Morishita	May 11, 1986 (aged 23)	cm / kg	28	0						
20	DF	Takayuki Fukumura	December 22, 1991 (aged 18)	cm / kg	0	0						
21	GK	Yuichi Mizutani	May 26, 1980 (aged 29)	cm / kg	17	0						
22	MF	Daigo Watanabe	December 3, 1984 (aged 25)	cm / kg	28	1						
23	FW	Asutaka Nakamura	September 13, 1990 (aged 19)	cm / kg	18	1						
24	DF	Tatsuya Masushima	April 22, 1985 (aged 24)	cm / kg	25	0						
26	DF	Makoto Kakuda	July 10, 1983 (aged 26)	cm / kg	24	4						
27	FW	Takumi Uesato	April 29, 1990 (aged 19)	cm / kg	0	0						
28	FW	Kim Seong-Yong	February 26, 1987 (aged 23)	cm / kg	9	2						
29	GK	Tatsuya Morita	August 3, 1990 (aged 19)	cm / kg	13	0						
30	GK	Tsuyoshi Kodama	December 28, 1987 (aged 22)	cm / kg	0	0						
31	FW	Takumi Miyayoshi	August 7, 1992 (aged 17)	cm / kg	14	3						

== Other pages ==
- (in Japanese) J. League official site
