= 2012 Kyoto Sanga FC season =

Kyoto Sanga
2012 season
- Manager: Takeshi Oki
- J.League Division 2: -
- Emperor's Cup: -
Home colours	Away colours

The 2012 Kyoto Sanga FC season sees Kyoto Sanga compete in J.League Division 2 for the second year in a row. This is their 19th nonconsecutive season in the second tier. Kyoto Sanga are also competing in the 2012 Emperor's Cup.

== Competitions ==
=== J. League ===
==== League table ====
Pos	Team	Pld	W	D	L	GF	GA	GD	Pts	Promotion or relegation
1	Ventforet Kofu (C, P)	42	24	14	4	63	35	+28	86	Promotion to 2013 J.League Division 1
2	Shonan Bellmare (P)	42	20	15	7	66	43	+23	75	Promotion to 2013 J.League Division 1
3	Kyoto Sanga	42	23	5	14	61	45	+16	74	Qualification for promotion playoffs
4	Yokohama FC	42	22	7	13	62	45	+17	73	Qualification for promotion playoffs
5	JEF United Chiba	42	21	9	12	61	33	+28	72	Qualification for promotion playoffs

Updated to match(es) played on 11 November 2012. Source: J.League Division 2
Rules for classification: 1st points; 2nd goal differential; 3rd goals scored; 4th head-to-head results; 5th disciplinary points; 6th draw. If two clubs are tied for first place, both clubs will be declared champions.
(C) Champions; (P) Promoted

==== Matches ====
4 March 2012 1	Shonan Bellmare	2 - 1	Kyoto Sanga	Shonan BMW Stadium Hiratsuka
Sunday 17:34	Iwakami 37'; Kikuchi 90+1'	Report	31' Nakayama	Attendance: 9,065; Referee: Okabe

11 March 2012 2	Kyoto Sanga	2 - 0	JEF United Chiba	Kyoto Nishikyogoku Athletic Stadium
Sunday 17:35	Nakamura 60'; Hara 90'	Report		Attendance: 8,003; Referee: Tojo

17 March 2012 3	Kyoto Sanga	2 - 0	Roasso Kumamoto	Kyoto Nishikyogoku Athletic Stadium
Saturday 13:04	Miyayoshi 32'; Nakayama 60'	Report		Attendance: 2,901; Referee: Tsukada

20 March 2012 4	Gainare Tottori	2 - 1	Kyoto Sanga	THE TOTTORI BANK Bird Stadium
Tuesday 19:03	Togawa 26'; Fukui 55'	Report	86' Miyayoshi	Attendance: 2,781; Referee: Ikeuchi

25 March 2012 5	Kyoto Sanga	2 - 1	Machida Zelvia	Kyoto Nishikyogoku Athletic Stadium
Sunday 13:00	Nakamura 61'; Hara 83'	Report	89' Hiramoto	Attendance: 4,795; Referee: Sato

1 April 2012 6	Kyoto Sanga	3 - 2	Avispa Fukuoka	Kyoto Nishikyogoku Athletic Stadium
Sunday 14:00	Kudo 6'; Someya (yellow card) 19'; Ando (yellow card) 34'; Fukumura (yellow card) 37'; Nagasawa 50'; Miyayoshi 58'	Report	Tsutsumi 20'; Takahashi 45'; Sueyoshi (yellow card) 72'; Oh Chang-Hyun (yellow card) 76'	Attendance: 7,224; Referee: (Japan) Yoshiro Imamura

8 April 2012 7	F.C. Gifu	0 - 1	Kyoto Sanga	Gifu Nagaragawa Stadium
Sunday 17:00	Jinushizono (yellow card) 17'	Report	Mizutani (yellow card) 27'; Someya (yellow card) 46'; Miyayoshi (yellow card) 62'; Hara 90+1'	Attendance: 3,408; Referee: (Japan) Ryoichi Imamura

15 April 2012 8	Kyoto Sanga	1 - 0	Tokyo Verdy	Kyoto Nishikyogoku Athletic Stadium
Sunday 15:00	Nagasawa (yellow card) 24'; Jung Woo-Young (yellow card) 35'; Hara 81'	Report	Nishi (yellow card) 23'	Attendance: 8,741; Referee: (Japan) Kazuyoshi Enomoto

22 April 2012 9	Yokohama	2 - 1	Kyoto Sanga	Nippatsu Mitsuzawa Stadium
Sunday 15:00	Hakkaku (yellow card) 16'; Ōkubo 31', 49'	Report	Someya (yellow card) 42'; Fukumura (yellow card) 67'; Hwang Te-Song (yellow card) 71'; Hara 90+5'	Attendance: 7,329; Referee: (Japan) Koichiro Fukushima

27 April 2012 10	Kyoto Sanga	1 - 2	Oita Trinita	Kyoto Nishikyogoku Athletic Stadium
Friday 20:00	Nakamura (yellow card) 9'; Hara 64'	Report	Takamatsu 10'; Mitsuhira 12'	Attendance: 5,021; Referee: (Japan) Yosuke Kubota

30 April 2012 11	Matsumoto Yamaga	0 - 0	Kyoto Sanga	Matsumotodaira Football Stadium
Monday 16:00		Report	Nakayama (yellow card) 81'; Akimoto (yellow card) 90+4'	Attendance: 12,154; Referee: (Japan) Akihiko Ikeuchi

3 May 2012 12	Kyoto Sanga	1 - 0	Tochigi S.C.	Kyoto Nishikyogoku Athletic Stadium
Thursday 14:00	Bajalica (yellow card) 32'; Akimoto (yellow card) 39'; Kuranuki (yellow card) 64'; Komai (yellow card) 65'; Ito 90'	Report		Attendance: 6,403; Referee: (Japan) Tetsuro Yoshida

6 May 2012 13	Ventforet Kofu	0 - 3	Kyoto Sanga	Yamanashi Chuo Bank Stadium
Sunday 14:00	Davi (yellow card) 19'; Sasaki (yellow card) 75'; Yamamoto (yellow card) 82'	Report	Sanou 5'; Mizutani (yellow card) 33'; Miyayoshi (yellow card) 40' (goal) 68'; Nakayama 49'; Bajalica (yellow card) 66'	Attendance: 9,563; Referee: (Japan) Hiroyuki Kimura

13 May 2012 14	Kyoto Sanga	2 - 1	Tokushima Vortis	Kyoto Nishikyogoku Athletic Stadium
Sunday 17:00	Nakamura 56'; Akimoto 71'	Report	Miyazaki (yellow card) 58'; Douglas 77'	Attendance: 5,881; Referee: (Japan) Toshimitsu Yoshida

20 May 2012 15	Fagiano Okayama	1 - 2	Kyoto Sanga	Kanko Stadium
Sunday 17:00	Tadokoro 18'	Report	Sanou 31'; Kudo 69'	Attendance: 11,088; Referee: (Japan) Hiroyuki Onishi
