= 2008 Kyoto Sanga FC season =

Kyoto Sanga FC
2008 season
- Manager: Hisashi Kato
- Stadium: Nishikyogoku Athletic Stadium
- J. League 1: 14th
- Emperor's Cup: 5th Round
- J. League Cup: GL-A 3rd
- Top goalscorer: Atsushi Yanagisawa (14)
| Home colours | Away colours | Third colours |

2008 Kyoto Sanga F.C. season

== Competitions ==
| Competitions | Position |
|---|---|
| J. League 1 | 14th / 18 clubs |
| Emperor's Cup | 5th Round |
| J. League Cup | GL-A 3rd / 4 clubs |

== Domestic results ==
=== J. League 1 ===
| Match | Date | Venue | Opponents | Score |
|---|---|---|---|---|
| 1 | 2008.. | | | - |
| 2 | 2008.. | | | - |
| 3 | 2008.. | | | - |
| 4 | 2008.. | | | - |
| 5 | 2008.. | | | - |
| 6 | 2008.. | | | - |
| 7 | 2008.. | | | - |
| 8 | 2008.. | | | - |
| 9 | 2008.. | | | - |
| 10 | 2008.. | | | - |
| 11 | 2008.. | | | - |
| 12 | 2008.. | | | - |
| 13 | 2008.. | | | - |
| 14 | 2008.. | | | - |
| 15 | 2008.. | | | - |
| 16 | 2008.. | | | - |
| 17 | 2008.. | | | - |
| 18 | 2008.. | | | - |
| 19 | 2008.. | | | - |
| 20 | 2008.. | | | - |
| 21 | 2008.. | | | - |
| 22 | 2008.. | | | - |
| 23 | 2008.. | | | - |
| 24 | 2008.. | | | - |
| 25 | 2008.. | | | - |
| 26 | 2008.. | | | - |
| 27 | 2008.. | | | - |
| 28 | 2008.. | | | - |
| 29 | 2008.. | | | - |
| 30 | 2008.. | | | - |
| 31 | 2008.. | | | - |
| 32 | 2008.. | | | - |
| 33 | 2008.. | | | - |
| 34 | 2008.. | | | - |

=== Emperor's Cup ===
| Match | Date | Venue | Opponents | Score |
|---|---|---|---|---|
| 4th Round | 2008.. | | | - |
| 5th Round | 2008.. | | | - |

=== J. League Cup ===
| Match | Date | Venue | Opponents | Score |
|---|---|---|---|---|
| GL-A-1 | 2008.. | | | - |
| GL-A-2 | 2008.. | | | - |
| GL-A-3 | 2008.. | | | - |
| GL-A-4 | 2008.. | | | - |
| GL-A-5 | 2008.. | | | - |
| GL-A-6 | 2008.. | | | - |

== Player statistics ==
| No. | Pos. | Player | D.o.B. (Age) | Height / Weight | J. League 1 | | Emperor's Cup | | J. League Cup | | Total | |
| No. | Pos. | Player | D.o.B. (Age) | Height / Weight | Apps | Goals | Apps | Goals | Apps | Goals | Apps | Goals |
|---|---|---|---|---|---|---|---|---|---|---|---|---|
| 1 | GK | Naohito Hirai | July 16, 1978 (aged 29) | cm / kg | 8 | 0 | | | | | | |
| 2 | MF | Ataliba | March 2, 1979 (aged 29) | cm / kg | 17 | 1 | | | | | | |
| 3 | DF | Sidiclei | May 13, 1972 (aged 35) | cm / kg | 33 | 1 | | | | | | |
| 4 | DF | Yusuke Nakatani | September 22, 1978 (aged 29) | cm / kg | 25 | 1 | | | | | | |
| 5 | DF | Kazuki Teshima | June 7, 1979 (aged 28) | cm / kg | 24 | 0 | | | | | | |
| 6 | DF | Ryuzo Morioka | October 7, 1975 (aged 32) | cm / kg | 7 | 0 | | | | | | |
| 7 | FW | Takaaki Tokushige | February 18, 1975 (aged 33) | cm / kg | 15 | 0 | | | | | | |
| 8 | MF | Kazuki Kuranuki | November 10, 1978 (aged 29) | cm / kg | 0 | 0 | | | | | | |
| 8 | DF | Hiroki Mizumoto | September 12, 1985 (aged 22) | cm / kg | 18 | 1 | | | | | | |
| 9 | FW | Yutaka Tahara | April 27, 1982 (aged 25) | cm / kg | 24 | 5 | | | | | | |
| 10 | FW | Paulinho | July 16, 1982 (aged 25) | cm / kg | 4 | 1 | | | | | | |
| 10 | MF | Fernandinho | January 13, 1981 (aged 27) | cm / kg | 16 | 3 | | | | | | |
| 11 | FW | Takenori Hayashi | October 14, 1980 (aged 27) | cm / kg | 19 | 1 | | | | | | |
| 13 | FW | Atsushi Yanagisawa | May 27, 1977 (aged 30) | cm / kg | 32 | 14 | | | | | | |
| 14 | MF | Yūto Satō | March 12, 1982 (aged 25) | cm / kg | 34 | 3 | | | | | | |
| 15 | MF | Hiroki Nakayama | December 13, 1985 (aged 22) | cm / kg | 14 | 0 | | | | | | |
| 16 | MF | Daisuke Saito | August 29, 1980 (aged 27) | cm / kg | 2 | 0 | | | | | | |
| 17 | MF | Toshiya Ishii | January 19, 1978 (aged 30) | cm / kg | 0 | 0 | | | | | | |
| 18 | MF | Jun Ando | October 8, 1984 (aged 23) | cm / kg | 15 | 1 | | | | | | |
| 19 | DF | Kentoku Noborio | November 30, 1983 (aged 24) | cm / kg | 0 | 0 | | | | | | |
| 20 | DF | Takashi Hirajima | February 3, 1982 (aged 26) | cm / kg | 12 | 0 | | | | | | |
| 21 | GK | Yuichi Mizutani | May 26, 1980 (aged 27) | cm / kg | 26 | 0 | | | | | | |
| 22 | MF | Daigo Watanabe | December 3, 1984 (aged 23) | cm / kg | 34 | 3 | | | | | | |
| 23 | DF | Yuki Okubo | April 17, 1984 (aged 23) | cm / kg | 13 | 0 | | | | | | |
| 24 | DF | Tatsuya Masushima | April 22, 1985 (aged 22) | cm / kg | 32 | 0 | | | | | | |
| 25 | DF | Yasumasa Nishino | September 14, 1982 (aged 25) | cm / kg | 12 | 0 | | | | | | |
| 26 | DF | Makoto Kakuda | July 10, 1983 (aged 24) | cm / kg | 24 | 1 | | | | | | |
| 27 | MF | Daishi Kato | July 26, 1983 (aged 24) | cm / kg | 0 | 0 | | | | | | |
| 28 | MF | William | January 10, 1989 (aged 19) | cm / kg | 0 | 0 | | | | | | |
| 29 | MF | Taisuke Nakamura | July 19, 1989 (aged 18) | cm / kg | 1 | 0 | | | | | | |
| 30 | MF | Koken Kato | April 3, 1989 (aged 18) | cm / kg | 2 | 0 | | | | | | |
| 31 | FW | Takumi Miyayoshi | August 7, 1992 (aged 15) | cm / kg | 2 | 0 | | | | | | |
| 33 | GK | Hideaki Ueno | May 31, 1981 (aged 26) | cm / kg | 0 | 0 | | | | | | |

== Other pages ==
- (in Japanese) J. League official site
