= 2000 JEF United Ichihara season =

JEF United Ichihara
2000 season
- Manager: Nicolae Zamfir; Zdenko Verdenik
- Stadium: Ichihara Seaside Stadium
- J.League 1: 14th
- Emperor's Cup: Quarterfinals
- J.League Cup: 2nd Round
- Top goalscorer: Baron (13)
Home colours	Away colours

2000 JEF United Ichihara season

== Competitions ==
Competitions	Position
J.League 1	14th / 16 clubs
Emperor's Cup	Quarterfinals
J.League Cup	2nd Round

== Domestic results ==
=== J.League 1 ===
11 March 2000 1-1	JEF United Ichihara	6-1	Kyoto Purple Sanga	Ichihara Seaside Stadium
JST (UTC+09)

18 March 2000 1-2	Sanfrecce Hiroshima	1-1 (GG) (a.e.t.)	JEF United Ichihara	Hiroshima Big Arch
JST (UTC+09)

25 March 2000 1-3	JEF United Ichihara	1-6	Vissel Kobe	Ichihara Seaside Stadium
JST (UTC+09)

1 April 2000 1-4	Verdy Kawasaki	0-1	JEF United Ichihara	Todoroki Athletics Stadium
JST (UTC+09)

5 April 2000 1-5	Cerezo Osaka	2-1 (GG) (a.e.t.)	JEF United Ichihara	Osaka Nagai Stadium
JST (UTC+09)

8 April 2000 1-6	JEF United Ichihara	1-0	Kawasaki Frontale	Ichihara Seaside Stadium
JST (UTC+09)

15 April 2000 1-7	JEF United Ichihara	2-3	Júbilo Iwata	Ichihara Seaside Stadium
JST (UTC+09)

22 April 2000 1-8	Kashima Antlers	0-1	JEF United Ichihara	Technoport Fukui Stadium
JST (UTC+09)

29 April 2000 1-9	JEF United Ichihara	0-1 (GG) (a.e.t.)	Nagoya Grampus Eight	Sendai Stadium
JST (UTC+09)

3 May 2000 1-10	Kashiwa Reysol	2-1	JEF United Ichihara	Hitachi Kashiwa Soccer Stadium
JST (UTC+09)

6 May 2000 1-11	JEF United Ichihara	3-0	Gamba Osaka	Ichihara Seaside Stadium
JST (UTC+09)

13 May 2000 1-12	Shimizu S-Pulse	1-0	JEF United Ichihara	Nihondaira Sports Stadium
JST (UTC+09)

17 May 2000 1-13	JEF United Ichihara	1-3	F.C. Tokyo	Ichihara Seaside Stadium
JST (UTC+09)

20 May 2000 1-14	Avispa Fukuoka	0-3	JEF United Ichihara	Hakatanomori Football Stadium
JST (UTC+09)

27 May 2000 1-15	JEF United Ichihara	0-2	Yokohama F. Marinos	Tokyo National Stadium
JST (UTC+09)

24 June 2000 2-1	Kyoto Purple Sanga	3-2	JEF United Ichihara	Nishikyogoku Athletic Stadium
JST (UTC+09)

1 July 2000 2-2	JEF United Ichihara	2-2 (GG) (a.e.t.)	Sanfrecce Hiroshima	Ichihara Seaside Stadium
JST (UTC+09)

8 July 2000 2-3	Gamba Osaka	1-0	JEF United Ichihara	Osaka Expo '70 Stadium
JST (UTC+09)

15 July 2000 2-4	JEF United Ichihara	1-0	Kashiwa Reysol	Ichihara Seaside Stadium
JST (UTC+09)

22 July 2000 2-5	Nagoya Grampus Eight	2-0	JEF United Ichihara	Mizuho Rugby Stadium
JST (UTC+09)

26 July 2000 2-6	JEF United Ichihara	1-2	Kashima Antlers	Ichihara Seaside Stadium
JST (UTC+09)

29 July 2000 2-7	Júbilo Iwata	3-1	JEF United Ichihara	Júbilo Iwata Stadium
JST (UTC+09)

5 August 2000 2-8	JEF United Ichihara	1-4	Verdy Kawasaki	Yamagata Park Stadium
JST (UTC+09)

12 August 2000 2-9	Vissel Kobe	2-1	JEF United Ichihara	Kobe Universiade Memorial Stadium
JST (UTC+09)

19 August 2000 2-10	Kawasaki Frontale	0-1	JEF United Ichihara	Todoroki Athletics Stadium
JST (UTC+09)

8 November 2000 2-11	JEF United Ichihara	0-1 (GG) (a.e.t.)	Cerezo Osaka	Ichihara Seaside Stadium
JST (UTC+09)

11 November 2000 2-12	Yokohama F. Marinos	1-0	JEF United Ichihara	International Stadium Yokohama
JST (UTC+09)

18 November 2000 2-13	JEF United Ichihara	4-3 (GG) (a.e.t.)	Avispa Fukuoka	Ichihara Seaside Stadium
JST (UTC+09)

23 November 2000 2-14	F.C. Tokyo	1-0 (GG) (a.e.t.)	JEF United Ichihara	Tokyo National Stadium
JST (UTC+09)

26 November 2000 2-15	JEF United Ichihara	1-2 (GG) (a.e.t.)	Shimizu S-Pulse	Ichihara Seaside Stadium
JST (UTC+09)

=== Emperor's Cup ===
1st Round	bye

2nd Round	bye

10 December 2000 3rd Round	JEF United Ichihara	1-0	Tochigi S.C.	Ichihara Seaside Stadium
JST (UTC+09)

17 December 2000 4th Round	JEF United Ichihara	3-1	Ventforet Kofu	Kochi Haruno Athletic Stadium
JST (UTC+09)

23 December 2000 Quarterfinals	Shimizu S-Pulse	3-1	JEF United Ichihara	Kagawa Marugame Stadium
JST (UTC+09)

=== J.League Cup ===
12 April 2000 1st Round-1	Ōita Trinita	2-2	JEF United Ichihara	Ōita Athletic Stadium
JST (UTC+09)

19 April 2000 1st Round-2	JEF United Ichihara	3-1 (5-3 agg.)	Ōita Trinita	Ichihara Seaside Stadium
JST (UTC+09)

5 July 2000 2nd Round-1	JEF United Ichihara	1-1	Nagoya Grampus Eight	Ichihara Seaside Stadium
JST (UTC+09)

12 July 2000 2nd Round-2	Nagoya Grampus Eight	2-1 (3-2 agg.)	JEF United Ichihara	Mizuho Athletic Stadium
JST (UTC+09)

== Player statistics ==
No.	Pos.	Nat.	Player	D.o.B. (Age)	Height / Weight	J.League 1		Emperor's Cup		J.League Cup		Total	
No.	Pos.	Nat.	Player	D.o.B. (Age)	Height / Weight	Apps	Goals	Apps	Goals	Apps	Goals	Apps	Goals
1	GK	(Japan)	Kenichi Shimokawa	May 14, 1970 (aged 29)	cm / kg	13	0						
2	DF	(Japan)	Eisuke Nakanishi	June 23, 1973 (aged 26)	cm / kg	27	3						
3	DF	(Japan)	Ichizo Nakata	April 19, 1973 (aged 26)	cm / kg	26	1						
4	DF	(Japan)	Takayuki Chano	November 23, 1976 (aged 23)	cm / kg	28	2						
5	DF	(Japan)	Satoshi Yamaguchi	April 17, 1978 (aged 21)	cm / kg	29	2						
6	MF	(Japan)	Tomoyuki Sakai	June 29, 1979 (aged 20)	cm / kg	27	1						
7	MF	(Japan)	Shinichi Muto	April 2, 1973 (aged 26)	cm / kg	25	2						
8	MF	(Japan)	Yuki Abe	September 6, 1981 (aged 18)	cm / kg	25	0						
9	FW	(Japan)	Katsutomo Oshiba	May 10, 1973 (aged 26)	cm / kg	22	2						
10	FW	(Brazil)	Baron	January 19, 1974 (aged 26)	cm / kg	30	13						
11	MF	(Japan)	Nozomi Hiroyama	May 6, 1977 (aged 22)	cm / kg	9	1						
12	GK	(Japan)	Tomonori Tateishi	April 22, 1974 (aged 25)	cm / kg	5	0						
13	FW	(Japan)	Takenori Hayashi	October 14, 1980 (aged 19)	cm / kg	16	2						
14	DF	(Japan)	Kazuhiro Suzuki	November 16, 1976 (aged 23)	cm / kg	8	0						
15	MF	(Japan)	Hiroyasu Ibata	June 25, 1974 (aged 25)	cm / kg	15	3						
16	MF	(Ghana)	Owusu Benson	March 22, 1977 (aged 22)	cm / kg	23	2						
17	GK	(Japan)	Ryo Kushino	March 3, 1979 (aged 21)	cm / kg	14	0						
18	DF	(Japan)	Tetsumasa Kimura	January 24, 1972 (aged 28)	cm / kg	0	0						
19	MF	(Japan)	Shinji Murai	December 1, 1979 (aged 20)	cm / kg	2	0						
20	FW	(Japan)	Ryohei Nishiwaki	August 1, 1979 (aged 20)	cm / kg	5	0						
21	MF	(Romania)	Ovidiu Burcă	March 16, 1980 (aged 19)	cm / kg	4	0						
22	DF	(Japan)	Yuki Inoue	October 31, 1977 (aged 22)	cm / kg	3	0						
23	MF	(Japan)	Masataka Sakamoto	February 24, 1978 (aged 22)	cm / kg	0	0						
24	FW	(Japan)	Takuma Sugano	April 5, 1980 (aged 19)	cm / kg	0	0						
24	DF	(Romania)	Cosmin Olăroiu	June 10, 1969 (aged 30)	cm / kg	10	0						
25	FW	(Japan)	Hisato Satō	March 12, 1982 (aged 17)	cm / kg	8	0						
26	MF	(Japan)	Kohei Uchida	April 15, 1980 (aged 19)	cm / kg	0	0						
27	DF	(Japan)	Hideomi Yamamoto	June 26, 1980 (aged 19)	cm / kg	0	0						
28	MF	(Japan)	Hirotaka Kobayashi	July 18, 1981 (aged 18)	cm / kg	0	0						
29	MF	(Japan)	Yūto Satō	March 12, 1982 (aged 17)	cm / kg	1	0						
30	DF		Kim Myung-Hwi	May 8, 1981 (aged 18)	cm / kg	0	0						
31	FW	(Japan)	Takafumi Ogura	July 6, 1973 (aged 26)	cm / kg	24	3						
32	DF	(Japan)	Takayuki Nishigaya	May 12, 1973 (aged 26)	cm / kg	0	0						
33	DF	(Japan)	Yasushi Kita	April 25, 1978 (aged 21)	cm / kg	7	0						
