= 2001 JEF United Ichihara season =

JEF United Ichihara
2001 season
- Manager: Zdenko Verdenik
- Stadium: Ichihara Seaside Stadium
- J.League 1: 3rd
- Emperor's Cup: Quarterfinals
- J.League Cup: Quarterfinals
- Top goalscorer: Choi Yong-Soo (21)
Home colours	Away colours

2001 JEF United Ichihara season

== Competitions ==
Competitions	Position
J.League 1	3rd / 16 clubs
Emperor's Cup	Quarterfinals
J.League Cup	Quarterfinals

== Domestic results ==
=== J.League 1 ===
10 March 2001 1-1	Júbilo Iwata	4-1	JEF United Ichihara	Júbilo Iwata Stadium
JST (UTC+09)

17 March 2001 1-2	JEF United Ichihara	1-2 (GG) (a.e.t.)	Nagoya Grampus Eight	Ichihara Seaside Stadium
JST (UTC+09)

31 March 2001 1-3	JEF United Ichihara	2-3 (GG) (a.e.t.)	Kashiwa Reysol	Ichihara Seaside Stadium
JST (UTC+09)

7 April 2001 1-4	Avispa Fukuoka	2-3 (GG) (a.e.t.)	JEF United Ichihara	Hakatanomori Football Stadium
JST (UTC+09)

14 April 2001 1-5	JEF United Ichihara	2-0	Yokohama F. Marinos	Akita Yabase Stadium
JST (UTC+09)

29 April 2001 1-6	FC Tokyo	0-3	JEF United Ichihara	Tokyo Stadium
JST (UTC+09)

3 May 2001 1-7	JEF United Ichihara	2-0	Kashima Antlers	Ichihara Seaside Stadium
JST (UTC+09)

6 May 2001 1-8	JEF United Ichihara	1-3	Sanfrecce Hiroshima	Ichihara Seaside Stadium
JST (UTC+09)

12 May 2001 1-9	Tokyo Verdy 1969	1-2	JEF United Ichihara	Tokyo Stadium
JST (UTC+09)

19 May 2001 1-10	JEF United Ichihara	4-1	Vissel Kobe	Ichihara Seaside Stadium
JST (UTC+09)

16 June 2001 1-11	Gamba Osaka	3-4 (GG) (a.e.t.)	JEF United Ichihara	Osaka Expo '70 Stadium
JST (UTC+09)

23 June 2001 1-12	JEF United Ichihara	2-0	Shimizu S-Pulse	Ichihara Seaside Stadium
JST (UTC+09)

7 July 2001 1-13	Consadole Sapporo	2-3 (GG) (a.e.t.)	JEF United Ichihara	Sapporo Atsubetsu Park Stadium
JST (UTC+09)

14 July 2001 1-14	Urawa Red Diamonds	3-1	JEF United Ichihara	Urawa Komaba Stadium
JST (UTC+09)

21 July 2001 1-15	JEF United Ichihara	4-2	Cerezo Osaka	Ichihara Seaside Stadium
JST (UTC+09)

11 August 2001 2-1	JEF United Ichihara	3-1	Tokyo Verdy 1969	Ichihara Seaside Stadium
JST (UTC+09)

18 August 2001 2-2	Sanfrecce Hiroshima	2-0	JEF United Ichihara	Hiroshima Stadium
JST (UTC+09)

25 August 2001 2-3	Cerezo Osaka	1-2	JEF United Ichihara	Osaka Nagai Stadium
JST (UTC+09)

8 September 2001 2-4	JEF United Ichihara	2-1	Urawa Red Diamonds	Tokyo National Stadium
JST (UTC+09)

15 September 2001 2-5	Kashima Antlers	3-1	JEF United Ichihara	Kashima Soccer Stadium
JST (UTC+09)

22 September 2001 2-6	JEF United Ichihara	2-2 (GG) (a.e.t.)	FC Tokyo	Matsumotodaira Football Stadium
JST (UTC+09)

29 September 2001 2-7	Yokohama F. Marinos	1-1 (GG) (a.e.t.)	JEF United Ichihara	International Stadium Yokohama
JST (UTC+09)

13 October 2001 2-8	JEF United Ichihara	3-0	Avispa Fukuoka	Ichihara Seaside Stadium
JST (UTC+09)

17 October 2001 2-9	Kashiwa Reysol	3-4	JEF United Ichihara	Hitachi Kashiwa Soccer Stadium
JST (UTC+09)

20 October 2001 2-10	Vissel Kobe	3-0	JEF United Ichihara	Kobe Universiade Memorial Stadium
JST (UTC+09)

31 October 2001 2-11	JEF United Ichihara	0-1	Gamba Osaka	Ichihara Seaside Stadium
JST (UTC+09)

3 November 2001 2-12	Shimizu S-Pulse	1-2	JEF United Ichihara	Nihondaira Sports Stadium
JST (UTC+09)

10 November 2001 2-13	JEF United Ichihara	2-0	Consadole Sapporo	Ichihara Seaside Stadium
JST (UTC+09)

17 November 2001 2-14	Nagoya Grampus Eight	5-1	JEF United Ichihara	Mizuho Athletic Stadium
JST (UTC+09)

24 November 2001 2-15	JEF United Ichihara	2-4	Júbilo Iwata	Ichihara Seaside Stadium
JST (UTC+09)

=== Emperor's Cup ===
1st Round	bye

2nd Round	bye

9 December 2001 3rd Round	JEF United Ichihara	5-0	Otsuka Pharmaceutical	Ichihara Seaside Stadium
JST (UTC+09)

16 December 2001 4th Round	Kyoto Purple Sanga	0-4	JEF United Ichihara	Nagasaki Athletic Stadium
JST (UTC+09)

24 December 2001 Quarterfinals	Urawa Red Diamonds	2-1	JEF United Ichihara	Sendai Stadium
JST (UTC+09)

=== J.League Cup ===
4 April 2001 1st Round-1	Omiya Ardija	1-1	JEF United Ichihara	Omiya Football Stadium
JST (UTC+09)

18 April 2001 1st Round-2	JEF United Ichihara	1-0 (2-1 agg.)	Omiya Ardija	Ichihara Seaside Stadium
JST (UTC+09)

13 June 2001 2nd Round-1	JEF United Ichihara	1-0	Shimizu S-Pulse	Ichihara Seaside Stadium
JST (UTC+09)

20 June 2001 2nd Round-2	Shimizu S-Pulse	2-1 (GG) (a.e.t.) (2-2 agg.) (4-5 p)	JEF United Ichihara	Kusanagi Athletic Stadium
JST (UTC+09)

8 August 2001 Quarterfinals-1	Júbilo Iwata	2-2	JEF United Ichihara	Kagoshima Kamoike Stadium
JST (UTC+09)

28 August 2001 Quarterfinals-2	JEF United Ichihara	0-2 (2-4 agg.)	Júbilo Iwata	Ichihara Seaside Stadium
JST (UTC+09)

== Player statistics ==
No.	Pos.	Nat.	Player	D.o.B. (Age)	Height / Weight	J.League 1		Emperor's Cup		J.League Cup		Total	
No.	Pos.	Nat.	Player	D.o.B. (Age)	Height / Weight	Apps	Goals	Apps	Goals	Apps	Goals	Apps	Goals
1	GK	(Japan)	Riki Takasaki	July 11, 1970 (aged 30)	cm / kg	1	0						
2	DF	(Japan)	Eisuke Nakanishi	June 23, 1973 (aged 27)	cm / kg	29	3						
3	DF	(Japan)	Yasushi Kita	April 25, 1978 (aged 22)	cm / kg	7	0						
4	DF	(Japan)	Takayuki Chano	November 23, 1976 (aged 24)	cm / kg	22	1						
5	DF	(Slovenia)	Željko Milinovič	October 12, 1969 (aged 31)	cm / kg	26	3						
6	MF	(Japan)	Yuki Abe	September 6, 1981 (aged 19)	cm / kg	17	3						
7	MF	(Japan)	Shinichi Muto	April 2, 1973 (aged 27)	cm / kg	28	3						
8	MF	(Japan)	Shigetoshi Hasebe	April 23, 1971 (aged 29)	cm / kg	24	1						
9	FW	(Japan)	Katsutomo Oshiba	May 10, 1973 (aged 27)	cm / kg	30	9						
10	FW	(South Korea)	Choi Yong-Soo	September 10, 1973 (aged 27)	cm / kg	26	21						
11	MF	(Bosnia and Herzegovina)	Edin Mujčin	January 14, 1970 (aged 31)	cm / kg	27	3						
12	GK	(Japan)	Tomonori Tateishi	April 22, 1974 (aged 26)	cm / kg	8	0						
13	DF	(Japan)	Megumu Yoshida	April 13, 1973 (aged 27)	cm / kg	22	1						
14	FW	(Japan)	Hisato Satō	March 12, 1982 (aged 18)	cm / kg	14	2						
15	MF	(Japan)	Hiroyasu Ibata	June 25, 1974 (aged 26)	cm / kg	5	1						
16	FW	(Japan)	Takenori Hayashi	October 14, 1980 (aged 20)	cm / kg	23	4						
17	GK	(Japan)	Ryo Kushino	March 3, 1979 (aged 22)	cm / kg	21	0						
18	FW	(Japan)	Takashi Uemura	December 2, 1973 (aged 27)	cm / kg	4	0						
19	MF	(Japan)	Shinji Murai	December 1, 1979 (aged 21)	cm / kg	25	1						
20	DF	(Japan)	Hideomi Yamamoto	June 26, 1980 (aged 20)	cm / kg	4	0						
21	GK	(Japan)	Takahiro Takagi	July 1, 1982 (aged 18)	cm / kg	0	0						
22	DF	(Japan)	Yuki Inoue	October 31, 1977 (aged 23)	cm / kg	0	0						
23	MF	(Japan)	Masataka Sakamoto	February 24, 1978 (aged 23)	cm / kg	19	3						
24	FW	(Japan)	Takuma Sugano	April 5, 1980 (aged 20)	cm / kg	3	1						
25	DF		Kim Myung-Hwi	May 8, 1981 (aged 19)	cm / kg	0	0						
26	MF	(Japan)	Yūto Satō	March 12, 1982 (aged 18)	cm / kg	0	0						
27	FW	(Japan)	Takuto Koyama	December 27, 1982 (aged 18)	cm / kg	0	0						
28	MF	(Japan)	Hirotaka Kobayashi	July 18, 1981 (aged 19)	cm / kg	0	0						
29	DF	(Japan)	Akihiro Tabata	May 15, 1978 (aged 22)	cm / kg	5	0						
31	DF	(Japan)	Kazuyoshi Mikami	August 29, 1975 (aged 25)	cm / kg	7	0						
