= 2004 JEF United Ichihara season =

JEF United Ichihara
2004 season
- Manager: Ivica Osim
- Stadium: Ichihara Seaside Stadium
- J. League 1: 4th
- Emperor's Cup: 4th Round
- J. League Cup: GL-C 3rd
- Top goalscorer: Marquinhos (12)
Home colours	Away colours

During the 2004 season, JEF United Ichihara competed in the J. League 1, the top tier of Japanese football, in which they finished 4th.

== Competitions ==
Competitions	Position
J. League 1	4th / 16 clubs
Emperor's Cup	4th Round
J. League Cup	GL-C 3rd / 4 clubs

== Domestic results ==
=== J. League 1 ===
Match	Date	Venue	Opponents	Score
1-1	2004.3.13	Kobe Wing Stadium	Vissel Kobe	2-1
1-2	2004.3.20	Ichihara Seaside Stadium	Yokohama F. Marinos	3-0
1-3	2004.4.3	Hiroshima Big Arch	Sanfrecce Hiroshima	1-3
1-4	2004.4.10	Ichihara Seaside Stadium	Kashima Antlers	2-1
1-5	2004.4.14	Osaka Expo '70 Stadium	Gamba Osaka	2-2
1-6	2004.4.18	National Stadium	Albirex Niigata	2-1
1-7	2004.5.2	Ichihara Seaside Stadium	Kashiwa Reysol	1-1
1-8	2004.5.5	Ajinomoto Stadium	Tokyo Verdy 1969	2-1
1-9	2004.5.9	Ichihara Seaside Stadium	Nagoya Grampus Eight	1-1
1-10	2004.5.15	Urawa Komaba Stadium	Urawa Red Diamonds	3-3
1-11	2004.5.22	Ichihara Seaside Stadium	Cerezo Osaka	1-1
1-12	2004.6.12	Yamaha Stadium	Júbilo Iwata	3-2
1-13	2004.6.16	Ichihara Seaside Stadium	FC Tokyo	2-2
1-14	2004.6.20	Oita Stadium	Oita Trinita	2-3
1-15	2004.6.26	Ichihara Seaside Stadium	Shimizu S-Pulse	1-1
2-1	2004.8.14	Ichihara Seaside Stadium	Sanfrecce Hiroshima	2-1
2-2	2004.8.21	Niigata Stadium	Albirex Niigata	3-3
2-3	2004.8.29	Kashima Soccer Stadium	Kashima Antlers	0-1
2-4	2004.9.11	Ichihara Seaside Stadium	Tokyo Verdy 1969	2-1
2-5	2004.9.19	Nagai Stadium	Cerezo Osaka	3-0
2-6	2004.9.23	Ichihara Seaside Stadium	Oita Trinita	2-0
2-7	2004.9.26	Hitachi Kashiwa Soccer Stadium	Kashiwa Reysol	0-0
2-8	2004.10.2	National Stadium	Urawa Red Diamonds	0-4
2-9	2004.10.17	Nihondaira Sports Stadium	Shimizu S-Pulse	1-2
2-10	2004.10.23	Mizuho Athletic Stadium	Nagoya Grampus Eight	0-2
2-11	2004.10.31	Ichihara Seaside Stadium	Gamba Osaka	2-2
2-12	2004.11.6	International Stadium Yokohama	Yokohama F. Marinos	2-1
2-13	2004.11.20	Ichihara Seaside Stadium	Vissel Kobe	5-1
2-14	2004.11.23	Ajinomoto Stadium	FC Tokyo	3-3
2-15	2004.11.28	Ichihara Seaside Stadium	Júbilo Iwata	2-1

=== Emperor's Cup ===
Match	Date	Venue	Opponents	Score
4th Round	2004.11.14	Muroran Irie Stadium	Consadole Sapporo	2-1 a.e.t. (sudden death)

=== J. League Cup ===
Match	Date	Venue	Opponents	Score
GL-C-1	2004.3.27	Ichihara Seaside Stadium	Shimizu S-Pulse	4-0
GL-C-2	2004.4.29	Oita Stadium	Oita Trinita	1-4
GL-C-3	2004.5.29	Nihondaira Sports Stadium	Shimizu S-Pulse	3-2
GL-C-4	2004.6.5	Akita Yabase Stadium	Oita Trinita	2-0
GL-C-5	2004.7.17	Urawa Komaba Stadium	Urawa Red Diamonds	2-1
GL-C-6	2004.7.24	Matsumotodaira Park Stadium	Urawa Red Diamonds	1-2

== Player statistics ==
No.	Pos.	Player	D.o.B. (Age)	Height / Weight	J. League 1		Emperor's Cup		J. League Cup		Total	
No.	Pos.	Player	D.o.B. (Age)	Height / Weight	Apps	Goals	Apps	Goals	Apps	Goals	Apps	Goals
1	GK	Tomonori Tateishi	April 22, 1974 (aged 29)	cm / kg	1	0						
2	MF	Masataka Sakamoto	February 24, 1978 (aged 26)	cm / kg	29	1						
3	DF	Daisuke Saito	November 19, 1974 (aged 29)	cm / kg	25	1						
4	DF	Takayuki Chano	November 23, 1976 (aged 27)	cm / kg	26	1						
5	DF	Željko Milinovič	October 12, 1969 (aged 34)	cm / kg	26	0						
6	MF	Yuki Abe	September 6, 1981 (aged 22)	cm / kg	24	5						
7	MF	Yūto Satō	March 12, 1982 (aged 22)	cm / kg	29	7						
8	FW	Marquinhos	March 23, 1976 (aged 27)	cm / kg	14	12						
9	FW	Takenori Hayashi	October 14, 1980 (aged 23)	cm / kg	20	2						
10	MF	Shigeyoshi Mochizuki	July 9, 1973 (aged 30)	cm / kg	0	0						
11	MF	Shinji Murai	December 1, 1979 (aged 24)	cm / kg	29	1						
13	FW	Sandro	March 22, 1980 (aged 23)	cm / kg	22	9						
14	DF	Masakazu Washida	November 15, 1978 (aged 25)	cm / kg	0	0						
15	MF	Koji Nakajima	August 20, 1977 (aged 26)	cm / kg	16	0						
16	MF	Satoru Yamagishi	May 3, 1983 (aged 20)	cm / kg	12	4						
17	GK	Ryo Kushino	March 3, 1979 (aged 25)	cm / kg	29	0						
18	FW	Seiichiro Maki	August 7, 1980 (aged 23)	cm / kg	30	6						
19	FW	Toshiaki Haji	August 28, 1978 (aged 25)	cm / kg	0	0						
20	MF	Kohei Kudo	August 28, 1984 (aged 19)	cm / kg	12	1						
22	MF	Naotake Hanyu	December 22, 1979 (aged 24)	cm / kg	25	1						
23	MF	Takashi Rakuyama	August 11, 1980 (aged 23)	cm / kg	8	0						
24	DF	Kozo Yuki	January 23, 1979 (aged 25)	cm / kg	11	0						
25	DF	Kim Wi-Man	June 23, 1979 (aged 24)	cm / kg	0	0						
26	MF	Takuya Shiihara	July 9, 1980 (aged 23)	cm / kg	0	0						
27	DF	Hiroki Mizumoto	September 12, 1985 (aged 18)	cm / kg	5	0						
28	DF	Yasuhiro Nomoto	June 25, 1983 (aged 20)	cm / kg	0	0						
29	MF	Koki Mizuno	September 6, 1985 (aged 18)	cm / kg	7	1						
30	GK	Masahiro Okamoto	May 17, 1983 (aged 20)	cm / kg	0	0						
31	DF	Mitsuki Ichihara	January 31, 1986 (aged 18)	cm / kg	3	0						
32	FW	Kim Dong-Soo	September 8, 1986 (aged 17)	cm / kg	0	0						
35	MF	Hironobu Haga	December 21, 1982 (aged 21)	cm / kg	1	0						
36	FW	Masaki Saito	November 4, 1978 (aged 25)	cm / kg	0	0						
37	FW	Yuichi Yoda	June 25, 1977 (aged 26)	cm / kg	5	2						

== Other pages ==
- (in Japanese) J. League official site
