= 2003 JEF United Ichihara season =

JEF United Ichihara
2003 season
- Manager: Ivica Osim
- Stadium: Ichihara Seaside Stadium
- J.League 1: 3rd
- Emperor's Cup: Quarterfinals
- J.League Cup: GL-C 3rd
- Top goalscorer: Choi Yong-Soo (17)
| Home colours | Away colours |

2003 JEF United Ichihara season

== Competitions ==
| Competitions | Position |
|---|---|
| J.League 1 | 3rd / 16 clubs |
| Emperor's Cup | Quarterfinals |
| J.League Cup | GL-C 3rd / 3 clubs |

== Domestic results ==
=== J.League 1 ===
| Match | Date | Venue | Opponents | Score |
|---|---|---|---|---|
| 1-1 | 2003.3.22 | Ichihara Seaside Stadium | Tokyo Verdy 1969 | 2-1 |
| 1-2 | 2003.4.5 | Ōita Stadium | Oita Trinita | 4-0 |
| 1-3 | 2003.4.12 | Ichihara Seaside Stadium | Vissel Kobe | 0-3 |
| 1-4 | 2003.4.19 | Osaka Expo '70 Stadium | Gamba Osaka | 3-3 |
| 1-5 | 2003.4.26 | Ichihara Seaside Stadium | Yokohama F. Marinos | 3-1 |
| 1-6 | 2003.4.29 | Ichihara Seaside Stadium | Kyoto Purple Sanga | 5-1 |
| 1-7 | 2003.5.5 | Nagai Stadium | Cerezo Osaka | 3-1 |
| 1-8 | 2003.5.10 | Matsumoto Stadium | Nagoya Grampus Eight | 1-2 |
| 1-9 | 2003.5.17 | Kashima Soccer Stadium | Kashima Antlers | 2-0 |
| 1-10 | 2003.5.24 | Ichihara Seaside Stadium | FC Tokyo | 0-0 |
| 1-11 | 2003.7.5 | Hitachi Kashiwa Soccer Stadium | Kashiwa Reysol | 2-0 |
| 1-12 | 2003.7.12 | Ichihara Seaside Stadium | Vegalta Sendai | 5-1 |
| 1-13 | 2003.7.20 | Yamaha Stadium | Júbilo Iwata | 2-2 |
| 1-14 | 2003.7.26 | Nihondaira Sports Stadium | Shimizu S-Pulse | 0-3 |
| 1-15 | 2003.8.2 | National Olympic Stadium (Tokyo) | Urawa Red Diamonds | 1-2 |
| 2-1 | 2003.8.17 | Kobe Wing Stadium | Vissel Kobe | 1-0 |
| 2-2 | 2003.8.23 | Ichihara Seaside Stadium | Gamba Osaka | 2-1 |
| 2-3 | 2003.8.30 | Mizuho Athletic Stadium | Nagoya Grampus Eight | 3-1 |
| 2-4 | 2003.9.7 | National Olympic Stadium (Tokyo) | Kashima Antlers | 2-3 |
| 2-5 | 2003.9.13 | Ajinomoto Stadium | FC Tokyo | 2-2 |
| 2-6 | 2003.9.20 | Ichihara Seaside Stadium | Kashiwa Reysol | 1-1 |
| 2-7 | 2003.9.23 | Urawa Komaba Stadium | Urawa Red Diamonds | 2-2 |
| 2-8 | 2003.9.27 | Ichihara Seaside Stadium | Shimizu S-Pulse | 2-1 |
| 2-9 | 2003.10.4 | International Stadium Yokohama | Yokohama F. Marinos | 0-1 |
| 2-10 | 2003.10.18 | Sendai Stadium | Vegalta Sendai | 2-1 |
| 2-11 | 2003.10.25 | Ichihara Seaside Stadium | Júbilo Iwata | 1-1 |
| 2-12 | 2003.11.8 | Nishikyogoku Athletic Stadium | Kyoto Purple Sanga | 2-3 |
| 2-13 | 2003.11.15 | Ichihara Seaside Stadium | Cerezo Osaka | 1-0 |
| 2-14 | 2003.11.23 | Ichihara Seaside Stadium | Oita Trinita | 1-1 |
| 2-15 | 2003.11.29 | Ajinomoto Stadium | Tokyo Verdy 1969 | 2-0 |

=== Emperor's Cup ===
| Match | Date | Venue | Opponents | Score |
|---|---|---|---|---|
| 3rd round | 2003.. | | | - |
| 4th round | 2003.. | | | - |
| Quarterfinals | 2003.. | | | - |

=== J.League Cup ===
| Match | Date | Venue | Opponents | Score |
|---|---|---|---|---|
| GL-C-1 | 2003.. | | | - |
| GL-C-2 | 2003.. | | | - |
| GL-C-3 | 2003.. | | | - |
| GL-C-4 | 2003.. | | | - |

== Player statistics ==
| No. | Pos. | Player | D.o.B. (Age) | Height / Weight | J.League 1 | | Emperor's Cup | | J.League Cup | | Total | |
| No. | Pos. | Player | D.o.B. (Age) | Height / Weight | Apps | Goals | Apps | Goals | Apps | Goals | Apps | Goals |
|---|---|---|---|---|---|---|---|---|---|---|---|---|
| 1 | GK | Ken Ishikawa | February 6, 1970 (aged 33) | cm / kg | 0 | 0 | | | | | | |
| 2 | DF | Eisuke Nakanishi | June 23, 1973 (aged 29) | cm / kg | 22 | 0 | | | | | | |
| 3 | DF | Megumu Yoshida | April 13, 1973 (aged 29) | cm / kg | 0 | 0 | | | | | | |
| 4 | DF | Takayuki Chano | November 23, 1976 (aged 26) | cm / kg | 25 | 0 | | | | | | |
| 5 | DF | Željko Milinovič | October 12, 1969 (aged 33) | cm / kg | 26 | 2 | | | | | | |
| 6 | MF | Yuki Abe | September 6, 1981 (aged 21) | cm / kg | 27 | 3 | | | | | | |
| 7 | MF | Shinichi Muto | April 2, 1973 (aged 29) | cm / kg | 3 | 0 | | | | | | |
| 8 | MF | Shigetoshi Hasebe | April 23, 1971 (aged 31) | cm / kg | 0 | 0 | | | | | | |
| 9 | FW | Katsutomo Oshiba | May 10, 1973 (aged 29) | cm / kg | 13 | 0 | | | | | | |
| 10 | FW | Choi Yong-Soo | September 10, 1973 (aged 29) | cm / kg | 24 | 17 | | | | | | |
| 11 | MF | Shigeyoshi Mochizuki | July 9, 1973 (aged 29) | cm / kg | 7 | 0 | | | | | | |
| 12 | GK | Tomonori Tateishi | April 22, 1974 (aged 28) | cm / kg | 0 | 0 | | | | | | |
| 13 | FW | Sandro | March 22, 1980 (aged 22) | cm / kg | 23 | 8 | | | | | | |
| 14 | MF | Yūto Satō | March 12, 1982 (aged 20) | cm / kg | 28 | 4 | | | | | | |
| 15 | MF | Koji Nakajima | August 20, 1977 (aged 25) | cm / kg | 3 | 0 | | | | | | |
| 16 | FW | Takenori Hayashi | October 14, 1980 (aged 22) | cm / kg | 23 | 7 | | | | | | |
| 17 | GK | Ryo Kushino | March 3, 1979 (aged 24) | cm / kg | 30 | 0 | | | | | | |
| 18 | FW | Seiichiro Maki | August 7, 1980 (aged 22) | cm / kg | 17 | 2 | | | | | | |
| 19 | MF | Shinji Murai | December 1, 1979 (aged 23) | cm / kg | 29 | 2 | | | | | | |
| 20 | MF | Kohei Kudo | August 28, 1984 (aged 18) | cm / kg | 2 | 0 | | | | | | |
| 21 | GK | Takahiro Takagi | July 1, 1982 (aged 20) | cm / kg | 0 | 0 | | | | | | |
| 22 | MF | Naotake Hanyu | December 22, 1979 (aged 23) | cm / kg | 25 | 6 | | | | | | |
| 23 | MF | Masataka Sakamoto | February 24, 1978 (aged 25) | cm / kg | 30 | 1 | | | | | | |
| 24 | DF | Teruaki Kobayashi | June 20, 1979 (aged 23) | cm / kg | 0 | 0 | | | | | | |
| 25 | DF | Kim Wi-Man | June 23, 1979 (aged 23) | cm / kg | 0 | 0 | | | | | | |
| 26 | MF | Satoru Yamagishi | May 3, 1983 (aged 19) | cm / kg | 20 | 2 | | | | | | |
| 27 | FW | Takuto Koyama | December 27, 1982 (aged 20) | cm / kg | 0 | 0 | | | | | | |
| 28 | DF | Yasuhiro Nomoto | June 25, 1983 (aged 19) | cm / kg | 0 | 0 | | | | | | |
| 29 | MF | Takashi Rakuyama | August 11, 1980 (aged 22) | cm / kg | 1 | 0 | | | | | | |
| 30 | GK | Masahiro Okamoto | May 17, 1983 (aged 19) | cm / kg | 0 | 0 | | | | | | |
| 31 | DF | Kozo Yuki | January 23, 1979 (aged 24) | cm / kg | 4 | 0 | | | | | | |
| 32 | DF | Daisuke Saito | November 19, 1974 (aged 28) | cm / kg | 28 | 1 | | | | | | |

== Other pages ==
- (in Japanese) J. League official site
