= Yūto Satō =

Japanese footballer

Yuto Sato 佐藤 勇人
Personal information
- Full name: Yuto Sato
- Date of birth: March 12, 1982 (age 44)
- Place of birth: Kasukabe, Saitama, Japan
- Height: 1.70 m (5 ft 7 in)
- Position: Midfielder

Youth career
- 1994–1999: JEF United Ichihara

Senior career*
Years	Team	Apps	(Gls)
2000–2007	JEF United Chiba	158	(26)
2008–2009	Kyoto Sanga FC	62	(3)
2010–2019	JEF United Chiba	356	(10)
Total		441	(37)

International career
2006	Japan	1	(0)
Medal record
JEF United Chiba
Winner	J.League Cup	2005
Winner	J.League Cup	2006
- * Club domestic league appearances and goals as of 1 January 2020

Yuto Sato (佐藤 勇人, Satō Yūto; born March 12, 1982) is a Japanese retired football player. He played as a midfielder for the Japan national team. His brother Hisato Sato is also footballer.

== Club career ==
Sato was born in Kasukabe on March 12, 1982. He joined J1 League club JEF United Ichihara (later JEF United Chiba) from youth team in 2000. He debuted in 2000 and played many matches as defensive midfielder from 2002. In 2003, he completely became a regular player and JEF United finished at the 3rd place under new manager Ivica Osim. After that, JEF United won the championship in 2005 and 2006 J.League Cup.

In 2008, Sato moved to Kyoto Sanga FC. He played as regular player in 2 seasons.

In 2010, Sato re-joined JEF United Chiba which club was relegated to J2 League from 2010 season. He played as regular player and JEF United qualified for Promotion Playoffs to J1 for 3 years in a row (2012-2014). However the club missed promotion for J1.

In October 2019, he announced he would play the last season for the club. In January 2020, he became "Club Officer", representing the club in several occasions.

== National team career ==
In August 2006, when Sato played for JEF United Chiba, he was selected Japan national team under new manager Ivica Osim who is manager for JEF United until July 2006. On August 16, Sato debuted for Japan against Yemen.

== Club statistics ==
As of 1 January 2020.

Club performance			League		Cup		League Cup		Total	
Season	Club	League	Apps	Goals	Apps	Goals	Apps	Goals	Apps	Goals
Japan			League		Emperor's Cup		J.League Cup		Total	
2000	JEF United Ichihara	J1 League	1	0	0	0	2	0	3	0
2001	JEF United Ichihara	J1 League	0	0	3	0	0	0	3	0
2002	JEF United Ichihara	J1 League	13	0	3	0	6	0	22	0
2003	JEF United Ichihara	J1 League	28	4	3	1	3	0	34	5
2004	JEF United Ichihara	J1 League	29	7	1	0	5	1	35	8
2005	JEF United Chiba	J1 League	34	8	1	0	11	0	46	8
2006	JEF United Chiba	J1 League	26	4	1	0	10	2	37	6
2007	JEF United Chiba	J1 League	27	3	0	0	5	1	32	4
Total			158	26	12	1	42	4	212	31
2008	Kyoto Sanga FC	J1 League	34	3	1	0	6	1	41	4
2009	Kyoto Sanga FC	J1 League	28	0	0	0	5	1	33	1
Total			62	3	1	0	11	1	74	4
2010	JEF United Chiba	J2 League	36	5	1	0	–		37	5
2011	JEF United Chiba	J2 League	36	1	2	0	–		38	1
2012	JEF United Chiba	J2 League	31	2	1	0	–		32	2
2013	JEF United Chiba	J2 League	30	0	1	2	–		31	2
2014	JEF United Chiba	J2 League	24	0	2	0	–		26	0
2015	JEF United Chiba	J2 League	26	0	1	0	–		27	0
2016	JEF United Chiba	J2 League	11	0	2	0	–		13	0
2017	JEF United Chiba	J2 League	19	0	1	0	–		20	0
2018	JEF United Chiba	J2 League	8	0	2	0	–		10	0
2019	JEF United Chiba	J2 League	18	0	0	0	–		18	0
Total			229	8	13	2	–		252	10
Career total			459	37	26	3	53	6	538	46

== National team statistics ==
Japan national team
Year	Apps	Goals
2006	1	0
Total	1	0
