= Hiroki Mizumoto =

Japanese footballer (born 1985)

Hiroki Mizumoto 水本 裕貴
Personal information
- Full name: Hiroki Mizumoto
- Date of birth: 12 September 1985 (age 41)
- Place of birth: Ise, Mie, Japan
- Height: 1.83 m (6 ft 0 in)
- Position: Centre back

Youth career
- 2001–2003: Mie High School

Senior career*
Years	Team	Apps	(Gls)
2004–2007	JEF United Chiba	76	(2)
2008	Gamba Osaka	7	(0)
2008–2010	Kyoto Sanga FC	85	(3)
2011–2020	Sanfrecce Hiroshima	235	(11)
2019	→ Matsumoto Yamaga (loan)	13	(1)
2020	→ Machida Zelvia (loan)	41	(1)
2021	Machida Zelvia	24	(0)
2022	SC Sagamihara	22	(0)

International career
2003–2005	Japan U-20	10	(0)
2006–2008	Japan U-23	19	(0)
2006–2015	Japan	7	(0)
Medal record
JEF United Chiba
Winner	J.League Cup	2005
Winner	J.League Cup	2006
Gamba Osaka
Winner	AFC Champions League	2008
Winner	Emperor's Cup	2008
Sanfrecce Hiroshima
Winner	J1 League	2012
Winner	J1 League	2013
Winner	J1 League	2015
Runner-up	J1 League	2018
Runner-up	J.League Cup	2014
Runner-up	Emperor's Cup	2013
Representing Japan
AFC U-19 Championship
Bronze medal – third place	2004 Malaysia
- * Club domestic league appearances and goals as of 19:48, 15 January 2023 (UTC)

Hiroki Mizumoto (水本 裕貴, Mizumoto Hiroki; born 12 September 1985) is a former Japanese football player who plays as a centre back.

== Club career ==
Mizumoto was born in Ise. After graduating from Mie High School, he joined J1 League side JEF United Ichihara (later JEF United Chiba). His first appearance in J1 League came on 20 May 2004 against Oita Trinita. He scored his first professional goal on 22 July 2006 against Sanfrecce Hiroshima.

He moved to Gamba Osaka in 2008 but he failed to claim a regular place there. On 23 June 2008 he transferred to Kyoto Sanga FC.

== National team career ==
In June 2005, Mizumoto was selected Japan U-20 national team for 2005 World Youth Championship. At this tournament, he played full-time in all 4 matches. In August 2008, he was selected Japan U-23 national team for 2008 Summer Olympics. At this tournament, he played full-time in all matches as captain.

Mizumoto made his senior national team debut on 4 October 2006, in a friendly match against Ghana.

== Club statistics ==
As of 14 February 2020.

Appearances and goals by club, season and competition
Club	Season	League		Emperor's Cup		J.League Cup		ACL		Other^{1}		Total	
Club	Season	Apps	Goals	Apps	Goals	Apps	Goals	Apps	Goals	Apps	Goals	Apps	Goals
JEF United Chiba	2004	5	0	1	0	1	0	—		—		7	0
JEF United Chiba	2005	15	0	2	0	3	0	—		—		20	0
JEF United Chiba	2006	25	1	1	0	11	0	—		3	0	40	1
JEF United Chiba	2007	31	1	1	0	5	0	—		—		37	1
Gamba Osaka	2008	7	0	0	0	0	0	4	0	—		11	0
Kyoto Sanga	2008	18	1	1	0	0	0	—		—		19	1
Kyoto Sanga	2009	33	2	2	0	5	0	—		—		40	2
Kyoto Sanga	2010	34	0	2	1	6	1	—		—		42	2
Sanfrecce Hiroshima	2011	18	1	2	1	0	0	—		—		20	2
Sanfrecce Hiroshima	2012	34	2	0	0	6	0	—		—		40	2
Sanfrecce Hiroshima	2013	34	3	5	0	2	0	6	0	4	0	51	3
Sanfrecce Hiroshima	2014	34	1	1	0	2	0	7	0	1	0	45	1
Sanfrecce Hiroshima	2015	33	1	1	0	1	0	—		1	0	36	1
Sanfrecce Hiroshima	2016	17	0	2	0	2	0	5	0	0	0	26	0
Sanfrecce Hiroshima	2017	34	3	1	0	2	0	—		—		37	3
Sanfrecce Hiroshima	2018	31	0	0	0	3	0	—		—		34	0
Sanfrecce Hiroshima	2019	0	0	1	0	0	0	—		—		1	0
Matsumoto Yamaga	2019	13	1	—		—		—		—		13	1
Career total		416	17	23	2	49	1	22	0	9	0	519	20

^{1}Includes A3 Champions Cup, Japanese Super Cup, FIFA Club World Cup and J.League Championship.

== National team statistics ==
Japan national team
Year	Apps	Goals
2006	2	0
2007	0	0
2008	1	0
2009	0	0
2010	0	0
2011	0	0
2012	2	0
2013	0	0
2014	1	0
2015	1	0
Total	7	0

=== Appearances in Major Competitions ===
Year	Competition	Category	Appearances		Goals	Team Record
Year	Competition	Category	Start	Sub	Goals	Team Record
2005	2005 FIFA World Youth Championship	U-20	4	0	0	Round of 16
2006	2007 AFC Asian Cup qualification	Senior	1	0	0	Qualified
2008	2008 Summer Olympics	U-23	3	0	0	Round 1

== Honours ==
=== Club ===
JEF United Chiba

- J.League Cup: 2005, 2006

Sanfrecce Hiroshima

- J1 League: 2012, 2013, 2015
- Japanese Super Cup: 2013, 2014, 2016

=== Individual ===
- J.League Best XI: 2012
