= 2002 JEF United Ichihara season =

JEF United Ichihara
2002 season
- Manager: Jozef Vengloš
- Stadium: Ichihara Seaside Stadium
- J.League 1: 7th
- Emperor's Cup: Semifinals
- J.League Cup: Quarterfinals
- Top goalscorer: Choi Yong-Soo (16)
Home colours	Away colours

2002 JEF United Ichihara season

== Competitions ==
Competitions	Position
J.League 1	7th / 16 clubs
Emperor's Cup	Semifinals
J.League Cup	Quarterfinals

== Domestic results ==
=== J.League 1 ===
Match	Date	Venue	Opponents	Score
1-1	2002.3.3	Ichihara Seaside Stadium	Kyoto Purple Sanga	2-1
1-2	2002.3.9	Kobe Universiade Memorial Stadium	Vissel Kobe	1-0
1-3	2002.3.16	National Olympic Stadium (Tokyo)	Kashima Antlers	0-2
1-4	2002.3.31	Ichihara Seaside Stadium	Yokohama F. Marinos	0-3
1-5	2002.4.6	National Olympic Stadium (Tokyo)	FC Tokyo	1-1 a.e.t.
1-6	2002.4.14	Ichihara Seaside Stadium	Shimizu S-Pulse	1-1 a.e.t.
1-7	2002.4.20	Osaka Expo '70 Stadium	Gamba Osaka	0-3
1-8	2002.7.13	Matsumoto Stadium	Nagoya Grampus Eight	3-4 a.e.t. (sudden death)
1-9	2002.7.20	Ichihara Seaside Stadium	Sanfrecce Hiroshima	0-1
1-10	2002.7.24	Sendai Stadium	Vegalta Sendai	3-2 a.e.t. (sudden death)
1-11	2002.7.27	Ichihara Seaside Stadium	Júbilo Iwata	2-2 a.e.t.
1-12	2002.8.3	Tokyo Stadium	Tokyo Verdy 1969	2-1
1-13	2002.8.7	Ichihara Seaside Stadium	Consadole Sapporo	2-0
1-14	2002.8.11	Hitachi Kashiwa Soccer Stadium	Kashiwa Reysol	3-1
1-15	2002.8.17	Urawa Komaba Stadium	Urawa Red Diamonds	2-1
2-1	2002.9.1	Ichihara Seaside Stadium	FC Tokyo	0-1
2-2	2002.9.7	Nihondaira Sports Stadium	Shimizu S-Pulse	0-1
2-3	2002.9.14	Mizuho Athletic Stadium	Nagoya Grampus Eight	1-3
2-4	2002.9.18	Ichihara Seaside Stadium	Vegalta Sendai	3-1
2-5	2002.9.22	Hiroshima Stadium	Sanfrecce Hiroshima	0-1
2-6	2002.9.28	Kashima Soccer Stadium	Kashima Antlers	2-3
2-7	2002.10.5	Ichihara Seaside Stadium	Tokyo Verdy 1969	0-2
2-8	2002.10.12	Yamaha Stadium	Júbilo Iwata	2-1
2-9	2002.10.20	Ichihara Seaside Stadium	Kashiwa Reysol	2-1
2-10	2002.10.23	Sapporo Dome	Consadole Sapporo	0-1
2-11	2002.10.26	Ichihara Seaside Stadium	Gamba Osaka	0-1 a.e.t. (sudden death)
2-12	2002.11.9	National Olympic Stadium (Tokyo)	Urawa Red Diamonds	1-0
2-13	2002.11.16	International Stadium Yokohama	Yokohama F. Marinos	1-0
2-14	2002.11.23	Ichihara Seaside Stadium	Vissel Kobe	2-0
2-15	2002.11.30	Nishikyogoku Athletic Stadium	Kyoto Purple Sanga	2-3

=== Emperor's Cup ===
Match	Date	Venue	Opponents	Score
3rd round	2002..			-
4th round	2002..			-
Quarterfinals	2002..			-
Semifinals	2002..			-

=== J.League Cup ===
Match	Date	Venue	Opponents	Score
GL-C-1	2002..			-
GL-C-2	2002..			-
GL-C-3	2002..			-
GL-C-4	2002..			-
GL-C-5	2002..			-
GL-C-6	2002..			-
Quarterfinals	2002..			-

== Player statistics ==
No.	Pos.	Player	D.o.B. (Age)	Height / Weight	J.League 1		Emperor's Cup		J.League Cup		Total	
No.	Pos.	Player	D.o.B. (Age)	Height / Weight	Apps	Goals	Apps	Goals	Apps	Goals	Apps	Goals
1	GK	Shinya Kato	September 19, 1980 (aged 21)	cm / kg	0	0						
2	DF	Eisuke Nakanishi	June 23, 1973 (aged 28)	cm / kg	24	0						
3	DF	Megumu Yoshida	April 13, 1973 (aged 28)	cm / kg	8	0						
4	DF	Takayuki Chano	November 23, 1976 (aged 25)	cm / kg	25	1						
5	DF	Željko Milinovič	October 12, 1969 (aged 32)	cm / kg	25	3						
6	MF	Yuki Abe	September 6, 1981 (aged 20)	cm / kg	24	1						
7	MF	Shinichi Muto	April 2, 1973 (aged 28)	cm / kg	25	0						
8	MF	Shigetoshi Hasebe	April 23, 1971 (aged 30)	cm / kg	17	0						
9	FW	Katsutomo Oshiba	May 10, 1973 (aged 28)	cm / kg	27	4						
10	FW	Choi Yong-Soo	September 10, 1973 (aged 28)	cm / kg	23	16						
11	MF	Edin Mujčin	January 14, 1970 (aged 32)	cm / kg	6	0						
11	MF	Ľubomír Moravčík	June 22, 1965 (aged 36)	cm / kg	2	0						
12	GK	Tomonori Tateishi	April 22, 1974 (aged 27)	cm / kg	8	0						
13	FW	Mitsutoshi Watada	March 26, 1976 (aged 25)	cm / kg	12	2						
14	MF	Yūto Satō	March 12, 1982 (aged 19)	cm / kg	13	0						
15	MF	Tadatoshi Masuda	December 25, 1973 (aged 28)	cm / kg	14	2						
16	FW	Takenori Hayashi	October 14, 1980 (aged 21)	cm / kg	22	2						
17	GK	Ryo Kushino	March 3, 1979 (aged 22)	cm / kg	23	0						
18	FW	Takashi Uemura	December 2, 1973 (aged 28)	cm / kg	0	0						
19	MF	Shinji Murai	December 1, 1979 (aged 22)	cm / kg	26	2						
20	DF	Hideomi Yamamoto	June 26, 1980 (aged 21)	cm / kg	0	0						
21	GK	Takahiro Takagi	July 1, 1982 (aged 19)	cm / kg	0	0						
22	MF	Naotake Hanyu	December 22, 1979 (aged 22)	cm / kg	23	2						
23	MF	Masataka Sakamoto	February 24, 1978 (aged 24)	cm / kg	30	1						
24	DF	Teruaki Kobayashi	June 20, 1979 (aged 22)	cm / kg	0	0						
25	DF	Kim Wi-Man	June 23, 1979 (aged 22)	cm / kg	0	0						
26	MF	Satoru Yamagishi	May 3, 1983 (aged 18)	cm / kg	0	0						
27	FW	Takuto Koyama	December 27, 1982 (aged 19)	cm / kg	0	0						
28	DF	Yasuhiro Nomoto	June 25, 1983 (aged 18)	cm / kg	0	0						
29	DF	Akihiro Tabata	May 15, 1978 (aged 23)	cm / kg	3	0						
30	GK	Masahiro Okamoto	May 17, 1983 (aged 18)	cm / kg	0	0						
31	DF	Kozo Yuki	January 23, 1979 (aged 23)	cm / kg	0	0						
32	DF	Daisuke Saito	November 19, 1974 (aged 27)	cm / kg	18	2						

== Other pages ==
- (in Japanese) J. League official site
