= Takuto Koyama =

Japanese footballer (born 1982)

Takuto Koyama 小山 拓土
Personal information
- Full name: Takuto Koyama
- Date of birth: December 27, 1982 (age 43)
- Place of birth: Tamba-Sasayama, Japan
- Height: 1.69 m (5 ft 6 1/2 in)
- Position: Midfielder

Youth career
- 1998–2000: Takigawa Daini High School

Senior career*
Years	Team	Apps	(Gls)
2001–2003	JEF United Ichihara	0	(0)
2004–2008	Tokushima Vortis	64	(5)
2009–2011	Banditonce Kakogawa	34	(1)
Total		98	(6)
- * Club domestic league appearances and goals

Takuto Koyama (小山 拓土, Koyama Takuto; born December 27, 1982) is a former Japanese football player.

== Playing career ==
Koyama was born in Tamba-Sasayama on December 27, 1982. After graduating from high school, he joined the J1 League club JEF United Ichihara in 2001. However he could hardly play in the match until 2003. In 2004, he moved to the Japan Football League club Otsuka Pharmaceutical (later Tokushima Vortis). Although he did not play at all, the club won the championship in 2004 and was promoted to the J2 League in 2005. He played many matches from 2005 and became a regular player as a left side midfielder in 2007. However he did not play as much summer 2007 and played less in 2008. In 2009, he moved to his local club, the Banditonce Kakogawa in the Regional Leagues. He played often over three seasons and retired at the end of the 2011 season.

== Club statistics ==
Club performance			League		Cup		League Cup		Total	
Season	Club	League	Apps	Goals	Apps	Goals	Apps	Goals	Apps	Goals
Japan			League		Emperor's Cup		J.League Cup		Total	
2001	JEF United Ichihara	J1 League	0	0	0	0	0	0	0	0
2002	JEF United Ichihara	J1 League	0	0	1	0	0	0	1	0
2003	JEF United Ichihara	J1 League	0	0	0	0	1	0	1	0
2004	Otsuka Pharmaceutical	Football League	0	0	0	0	-		0	0
2005	Tokushima Vortis	J2 League	15	2	1	3	-		16	5
2006	Tokushima Vortis	J2 League	14	0	1	0	-		15	0
2007	Tokushima Vortis	J2 League	33	3	1	0	-		34	3
2008	Tokushima Vortis	J2 League	2	0	0	0	-		2	0
2009	Banditonce Kakogawa	Regional Leagues	12	1	-		-		12	1
2010	Banditonce Kakogawa	Regional Leagues	10	0	-		-		10	0
2011	Banditonce Kakogawa	Regional Leagues	12	0	-		-		12	0
Total			98	6	4	3	1	0	103	9
