= Katsutomo Oshiba =

Japanese footballer

Katsutomo Oshiba 大柴 克友
Personal information
- Full name: Katsutomo Oshiba
- Date of birth: May 10, 1973 (age 53)
- Place of birth: Yamanashi, Japan
- Height: 1.72 m (5 ft 7 1/2 in)
- Position: Forward

Youth career
- 1989–1991: Nirasaki High School
- 1992–1995: Meiji University

Senior career*
Years	Team	Apps	(Gls)
1996–1999	Ventforet Kofu	92	(20)
2000–2003	JEF United Ichihara	92	(15)
2004–2006	Vegalta Sendai	93	(20)
Total		277	(55)
- * Club domestic league appearances and goals

Katsutomo Oshiba (大柴 克友, Oshiba Katsutomo; born May 10, 1973) is a former Japanese football player.

== Playing career ==
Oshiba was born in Yamanashi Prefecture on May 10, 1973. After graduating from Meiji University, he joined the Japan Football League club Ventforet Kofu, based in his local area in 1996. He played many matches as a forward from first season and the club was promoted to new league J2 League from 1999. In 2000, he moved to J1 League club JEF United Ichihara. He played many matches as an offensive midfielder and a forward. His opportunity to play decreased in 2003. In 2004, he moved to J2 club Vegalta Sendai. He played many matches as a forward until 2005. However, his opportunity to play decreased in 2006 and he retired at the end of the 2006 season.

== Career statistics ==
Appearances and goals by club, season and competition
Club	Season	League			Emperor's Cup		J.League Cup		Total	
Club	Season	Division	Apps	Goals	Apps	Goals	Apps	Goals	Apps	Goals
Ventforet Kofu	1996	Football League	15	2	2	0	—		17	2
Ventforet Kofu	1997	Football League	24	9	3	0	—		27	9
Ventforet Kofu	1998	Football League	17	2	4	3	—		21	5
Ventforet Kofu	1999	J2 League	36	7	0	0	2	0	38	7
JEF United Ichihara	2000	J1 League	22	2	3	0	3	0	28	2
JEF United Ichihara	2001	J1 League	30	9	3	1	6	1	39	11
JEF United Ichihara	2002	J1 League	27	4	4	1	1	0	32	5
JEF United Ichihara	2003	J1 League	13	0	0	0	1	0	14	0
Vegalta Sendai	2004	J2 League	39	9	2	0	—		41	9
Vegalta Sendai	2005	J2 League	40	10	1	0	—		41	10
Vegalta Sendai	2006	J2 League	14	1	2	0	—		16	1
Career total			277	55	24	5	13	1	314	61
