= Takenori Hayashi =

Japanese footballer (born 1980)

Takenori Hayashi 林 丈統
Personal information
- Full name: Takenori Hayashi
- Date of birth: October 14, 1980 (age 46)
- Place of birth: Nara, Japan
- Height: 1.68 m (5 ft 6 in)
- Position: Forward

Youth career
- 1996–1998: Takigawa Daini High School

Senior career*
Years	Team	Apps	(Gls)
1999–2005	JEF United Chiba	151	(22)
2006–2009	Kyoto Sanga FC	71	(4)
2007	→Júbilo Iwata (loan)	13	(2)
2010–2011	JEF United Chiba	23	(0)
2012	BEC Tero Sasana	4	(0)
2012–2013	Oita Trinita	13	(0)
Total		275	(28)
Medal record
JEF United Chiba
Winner	J.League Cup	2005
- * Club domestic league appearances and goals

Takenori Hayashi (林 丈統, Hayashi Takenori; born October 14, 1980) is a former Japanese football player.

== Playing career ==
Hayashi was born in Nara on October 14, 1980. After graduating from high school, he joined J1 League club JEF United Ichihara (later JEF United Chiba) in 1999. He played many matches as substitute forward for a long time from first season. The club won the 3rd place in 2001 and 2003 J1 League and the champions in 2005 J.League Cup. In 2006, he moved to Kyoto Purple Sanga (later Kyoto Sanga FC). Although he played many matches as substitute forward, the club finished at the bottom place. In 2007, he move to Júbilo Iwata on loan. However he could not play many matches. In 2008, he returned to Kyoto Sanga FC. He played many matches over two seasons. In 2010, he moved to his first club, JEF United Chiba. However he could not play many matches. In 2012, he moved to Thai club BEC Tero Sasana. In July 2012, he returned to Japan and joined J2 club Oita Trinita. The club finished in sixth place and qualified for the promotion playoff. In the promotion playoff final, he scored a winning goal in the 86th minute and the club was promoted to J1 in 2013. He retired at the end of the 2013 season.

== Club statistics ==
Club performance			League		Cup		League Cup		Total	
Season	Club	League	Apps	Goals	Apps	Goals	Apps	Goals	Apps	Goals
Japan			League		Emperor's Cup		J.League Cup		Total	
1999	JEF United Ichihara	J1 League	17	1	1	0	1	1	19	2
2000	JEF United Ichihara	J1 League	16	2	2	1	4	2	22	5
2001	JEF United Ichihara	J1 League	23	4	2	1	3	0	28	5
2002	JEF United Ichihara	J1 League	22	2	4	2	6	2	32	6
2003	JEF United Ichihara	J1 League	23	7	3	1	2	0	28	8
2004	JEF United Ichihara	J1 League	20	2	0	0	5	2	25	4
2005	JEF United Chiba	J1 League	30	4	2	1	11	4	43	9
2006	Kyoto Purple Sanga	J1 League	23	2	1	0	2	1	26	3
2007	Júbilo Iwata	J1 League	13	2	1	0	4	0	16	2
2008	Kyoto Sanga FC	J1 League	19	1	2	1	3	1	24	3
2009	Kyoto Sanga FC	J1 League	29	1	1	1	3	0	33	2
2010	JEF United Chiba	J2 League	7	0	1	0	-		8	0
2011	JEF United Chiba	J2 League	16	0	3	0	-		19	0
Thailand			League		Queen's Cup		League Cup		Total	
2012	BEC Tero Sasana	Premier League	4	0					4	0
Japan			League		Emperor's Cup		J.League Cup		Total	
2012	Oita Trinita	J2 League	5	0	0	0	-		5	0
2013	Oita Trinita	J1 League	8	0	0	0	3	0	11	0
Country	Japan		271	28	23	8	47	13	341	49
Country	Thailand		4	0					4	0
Total			275	28	23	8	47	13	345	49

== Honors and awards ==
Topscorer in All Japan High School Soccer Tournament: 1998
