= Takayuki Chano =

Japanese footballer (born 1976)

Takayuki Chano 茶野 隆行
Personal information
- Full name: Takayuki Chano
- Date of birth: 23 November 1976 (age 49)
- Place of birth: Ichikawa, Chiba, Japan
- Height: 1.78 m (5 ft 10 in)
- Position: Defender

Youth career
- 1992–1994: Ichiritsu Funabashi High School

Senior career*
Years	Team	Apps	(Gls)
1995–2004	JEF United Ichihara	228	(5)
2005–2009	Júbilo Iwata	122	(5)
2010–2011	JEF United Chiba	27	(2)
Total		377	(12)

International career
2004–2005	Japan	7	(0)
Medal record
JEF United Ichihara
Runner-up	J.League Cup	1998
Representing Japan
AFC Asian Cup
Gold medal – first place	2004 China
- * Club domestic league appearances and goals

Takayuki Chano (茶野 隆行, Chano Takayuki; born 23 November 1976) is a former Japanese football player. He played for Japan national team.

== Club career ==
Chano was born in Ichikawa on 23 November 1976. After graduating from high school, he joined his local club JEF United Ichihara (later JEF United Chiba) in 1995. He played many matches as center back from 1998. The club won second place in the 1998 Emperor's Cup. The club also won third place in the 2001 and 2003 J1 League. He moved to Júbilo Iwata with teammate Shinji Murai in 2005. He played many matches as center back with Japan national team player Makoto Tanaka. He left the club with Murai at the end of the 2009 season for a generational change and he returned to JEF United Chiba with Murai in 2010. He retired at the end of the 2011 season.

== National team career ==
On 25 April 2004, Chano debuted for Japan national team against Hungary. In July, he was elected Japan for 2004 Asian Cup. At this tournament, although he did not play in the match, Japan won the champions. He also played at 2005 Confederations Cup. He played 7 games for Japan until 2005.

== Club statistics ==
Club performance			League		Cup		League Cup		Continental		Total	
Season	Club	League	Apps	Goals	Apps	Goals	Apps	Goals	Apps	Goals	Apps	Goals
Japan			League		Emperor's Cup		J.League Cup		Asia		Total	
1995	JEF United Ichihara	J1 League	26	0	0	0	-		-		26	0
1996	JEF United Ichihara	J1 League	16	0	1	0	7	0	-		24	0
1997	JEF United Ichihara	J1 League	8	0	1	0	4	0	-		13	0
1998	JEF United Ichihara	J1 League	25	0	1	0	5	0	-		31	0
1999	JEF United Ichihara	J1 League	27	0	1	0	2	0	-		30	0
2000	JEF United Ichihara	J1 League	28	2	3	0	1	0	-		32	2
2001	JEF United Ichihara	J1 League	22	1	3	0	3	0	-		28	1
2002	JEF United Ichihara	J1 League	25	1	0	0	4	1	-		29	2
2003	JEF United Ichihara	J1 League	25	0	2	0	3	0	-		30	0
2004	JEF United Ichihara	J1 League	26	1	0	0	1	0	-		27	1
2005	Júbilo Iwata	J1 League	28	1	3	0	1	0	5	0	37	1
2006	Júbilo Iwata	J1 League	20	1	0	0	7	1	-		27	2
2007	Júbilo Iwata	J1 League	18	2	2	1	2	1	-		22	4
2008	Júbilo Iwata	J1 League	27	1	1	0	4	0	-		32	1
2009	Júbilo Iwata	J1 League	29	0	3	0	4	0	-		36	0
2010	JEF United Chiba	J2 League	24	2	1	0	-		-		25	2
2011	JEF United Chiba	J2 League	3	0	1	0	-		-		4	0
Total			377	12	23	1	48	3	5	0	453	16

== National team statistics ==
Japan national team
Year	Apps	Goals
2004	3	0
2005	4	0
Total	7	0

== National team career statistics ==
=== Appearances in major competitions ===
Team	Competition	Category	Appearances		Goals	Team record
Team	Competition	Category	Start	Sub	Goals	Team record
Japan	2004 AFC Asian Cup	Senior	0	0	0	Champions
Japan	2005 FIFA Confederations Cup	Senior	1	0	0	Round 1
Japan	East Asian Football Championship 2005	Senior	2	0	0	2nd place

=== Squads ===
- 2004 Asian Cup

== Honors and awards ==
=== Team honors ===
- AFC Asian Cup Champions: 2004
