= Edin Mujčin =

Bosnian footballer (born 1970)

Personal information
- Full name: Edin Mujčin
- Date of birth: 14 January 1970 (age 56)
- Place of birth: Bosanski Brod, SR Bosnia and Herzegovina, Yugoslavia
- Height: 1.74 m (5 ft 9 in)
- Position: Midfielder

Senior career*
Years	Team	Apps	(Gls)
1986–1991	Polet Bosanski Brod		
1991–1995	Marsonia	43	(6)
1995–2001	Croatia Zagreb	128	(28)
2001–2002	JEF United Ichihara	33	(3)
2002–2005	Dinamo Zagreb	76	(4)
2005–2007	Kamen Ingrad	45	(4)
2007–2008	Lokomotiva	30	(3)
2008–2009	Lučko	27	(1)
2009–2010	Savski Marof		
2010–2011	Zelina	29	(4)

International career
1997–2002	Bosnia and Herzegovina	24	(1)
- * Club domestic league appearances and goals

Edin Mujčin (born 14 January 1970) is a Bosnian retired footballer.

Mujčin moved to Croatia during the Bosnian War. He holds the Croatian citizenship.

== Club career ==
Mujčin spent most of his career with Croatian team Dinamo Zagreb, winning several national titles and appearing in both UEFA Champions League and UEFA Cup. He spent his last two seasons at NK Kamen Ingrad in the Croatian first division, before retiring from professional football following their relegation in 2007.

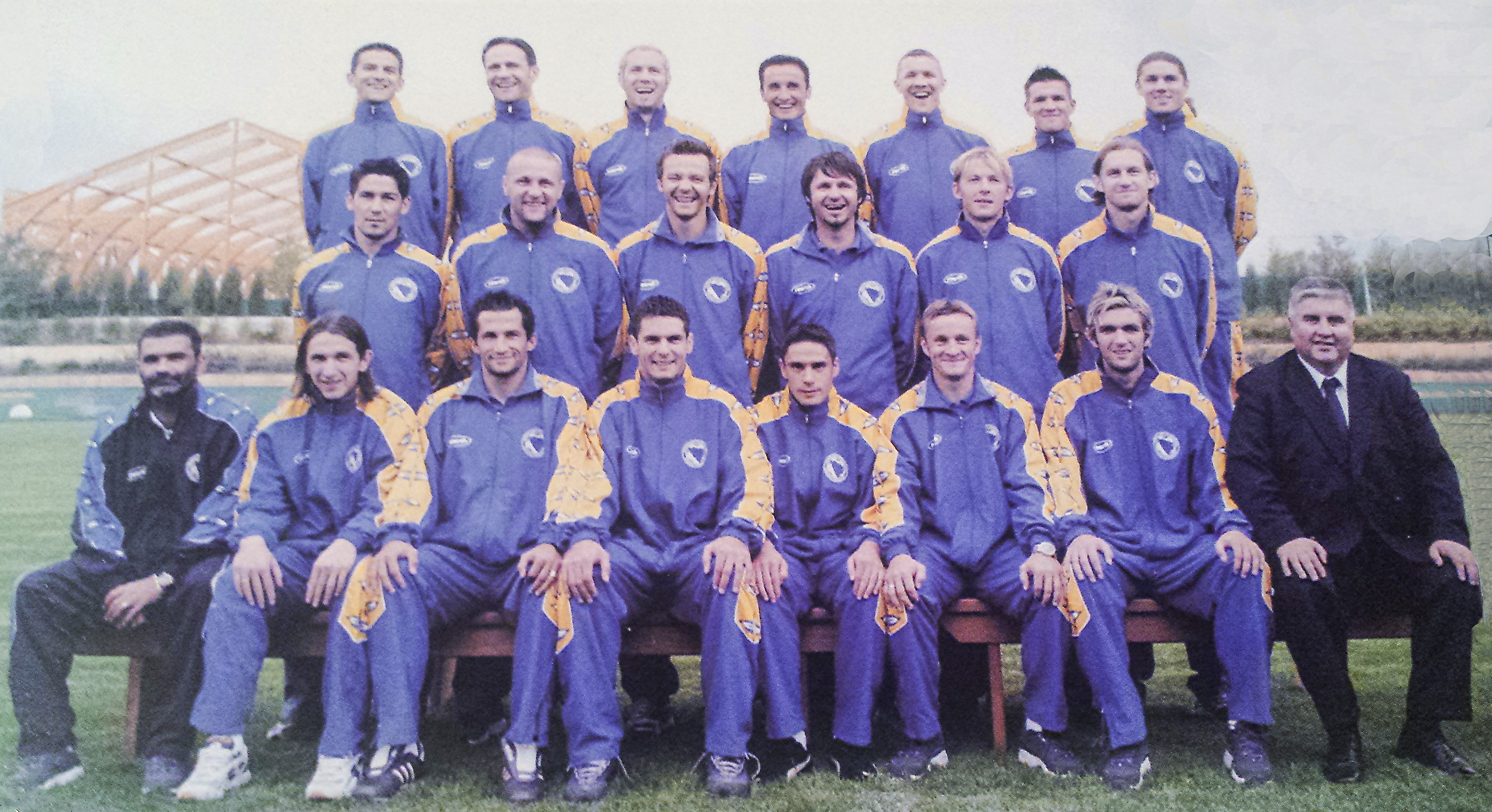
Bosnia-Herzegovina squad during UEFA Euro 2004 qualifying.

=== Club statistics ===
Club performance			League		Cup		League Cup		Total	
Season	Club	League	Apps	Goals	Apps	Goals	Apps	Goals	Apps	Goals
Croatia			League		Croatian Cup		League Cup		Total	
1994/95	Marsonia Slavonski Brod	Prva HNL	26	6					26	6
1995/96	Marsonia Slavonski Brod	Prva HNL	17	0					17	0
1995/96	Croatia Zagreb	Prva HNL	10	1					10	1
1996/97	Croatia Zagreb	Prva HNL	21	5					21	5
1997/98	Croatia Zagreb	Prva HNL	27	6					27	6
1998/99	Croatia Zagreb	Prva HNL	27	10					27	10
1999/00	Croatia Zagreb	Prva HNL	25	3					25	3
2000/01	Dinamo Zagreb	Prva HNL	18	3					18	3
Japan			League		Emperor's Cup		J.League Cup		Total	
2001	JEF United Ichihara	J1 League	27	3	1	1	5	0	33	4
2002	JEF United Ichihara	J1 League	6	0	0	0	3	0	9	0
Croatia			League		Croatian Cup		League Cup		Total	
2002/03	Dinamo Zagreb	Prva HNL	28	2					28	2
2003/04	Dinamo Zagreb	Prva HNL	26	2					26	2
2004/05	Dinamo Zagreb	Prva HNL	22	0					22	0
2005/06	Kamen Ingrad	Prva HNL	25	2					25	2
2006/07	Kamen Ingrad	Prva HNL	20	2					20	2
2007/08	Lokomotiva Zagreb	Treća HNL	30	3						
2008/09	Lučko	Treća HNL	27	1						
2009/10	Savski Marof	Zagreb county First league								
2010/11	Zelina	Treća HNL	29	4						
Country	Croatia		292	42					292	42
Country	Japan		33	3	1	1	8	0	42	4
Total			325	45	1	1	8	0	334	46

== International career ==
He made his debut for Bosnia and Herzegovina in a June 1997 World Cup qualification match away against Denmark and has earned a total of 24 caps, scoring 1 goal. His final international was an October 2002 European Championship qualification match away against Norway.

=== National team statistics ===
Bosnia and Herzegovina national team
Year	Apps	Goals
1997	4	1
1998	4	0
1999	6	0
2000	3	0
2001	4	0
2002	2	0
Total	23	1

=== International goals ===
Scores and results list Bosnia and Herzegovina's goal tally first.

#	Date	Venue	Opponent	Score	Result	Competition
1.	20 August 1997	Koševo Stadium, Sarajevo	Denmark	1–0	3–0	1998 FIFA World Cup qualification
