= Shinji Murai =

Japanese footballer (born 1979)

Shinji Murai 村井 慎二
Personal information
- Full name: Shinji Murai
- Date of birth: December 1, 1979 (age 46)
- Place of birth: Chiba, Japan
- Height: 1.75 m (5 ft 9 in)
- Position: Midfielder

Youth career
- 1995–1997: JEF United Ichihara

Senior career*
Years	Team	Apps	(Gls)
1998–2004	JEF United Ichihara	116	(7)
2005–2009	Júbilo Iwata	112	(4)
2010–2011	JEF United Chiba	22	(3)
2012–2013	Oita Trinita	44	(5)
Total		294	(19)

International career
2005–2006	Japan	5	(0)
Medal record
JEF United Chiba
Runner-up	J.League Cup	1998
- * Club domestic league appearances and goals

Shinji Murai (村井 慎二, Murai Shinji; born December 1, 1979) is a former Japanese football player. He played for Japan national team.

== Club career ==
Murai was born in Chiba on December 1, 1979. He joined his local club JEF United Ichihara (later JEF United Chiba) from youth team in 1998. He became a regular player as left midfielder from 2001. The club won the 3rd place 2001 and 2003 J1 League. He moved to Júbilo Iwata with team mate Takayuki Chano in 2005. He played many matches until 2009 except when he injured in 2006. He left the club with Chano end of 2009 season for generational change and he returned to JEF United Chiba with Chano in 2010. He moved to Oita Trinita in 2012 and played until 2013.

== National team career ==
In July 2005, Murai was selected Japan national team for 2005 East Asian Football Championship, where Japan finished second. At this tournament, on August 3, he debuted against China. He played 5 games for Japan until 2006.

== Club statistics ==
Club performance			League		Cup		League Cup		Continental		Total	
Season	Club	League	Apps	Goals	Apps	Goals	Apps	Goals	Apps	Goals	Apps	Goals
Japan			League		Emperor's Cup		J.League Cup		Asia		Total	
1998	JEF United Ichihara	J1 League	4	1	0	0	0	0	-		4	1
1999	JEF United Ichihara	J1 League	1	0	0	0	2	0	-		3	0
2000	JEF United Ichihara	J1 League	2	0	0	0	2	0	-		4	0
2001	JEF United Ichihara	J1 League	25	1	3	0	5	0	-		33	1
2002	JEF United Ichihara	J1 League	26	2	0	0	5	2	-		31	4
2003	JEF United Ichihara	J1 League	29	2	3	3	3	0	-		35	5
2004	JEF United Ichihara	J1 League	29	1	1	0	5	0	-		35	1
2005	Júbilo Iwata	J1 League	30	0	3	0	1	0	4	0	38	0
2006	Júbilo Iwata	J1 League	11	1	0	0	2	1	-		13	2
2007	Júbilo Iwata	J1 League	23	2	0	0	5	0	-		28	2
2008	Júbilo Iwata	J1 League	24	0	0	0	2	0	-		26	0
2009	Júbilo Iwata	J1 League	24	1	1	0	4	0	-		29	0
2010	JEF United Chiba	J2 League	4	1	2	0	-		-		6	1
2011	JEF United Chiba	J2 League	18	2	2	0	-		-		20	2
2012	Oita Trinita	J2 League	37	5	0	0	-		-		37	5
2013	Oita Trinita	J1 League	7	0	0	0	3	0	-		10	0
Career total			294	19	15	3	39	3	4	0	352	25

== National team statistics ==
Japan national team
Year	Apps	Goals
2005	3	0
2006	2	0
Total	5	0
