= Željko Milinovič =

Slovenian footballer (born 1969)

Personal information
- Date of birth: 12 October 1969 (age 57)
- Place of birth: Ljubljana, SFR Yugoslavia
- Height: 1.88 m (6 ft 2 in)
- Position: Defender

Youth career
- Slovan

Senior career*
Years	Team	Apps	(Gls)
1991	Slovan	17	(0)
1992–1994	Olimpija	50	(4)
1994–1995	Ljubljana	25	(1)
1995–1998	Maribor	99	(3)
1998–2000	LASK	65	(6)
2000–2001	Grazer AK	19	(1)
2001–2004	JEF United	103	(8)
2004–2006	LASK	46	(0)
2006–2007	Olimpija Bežigrad	15	(2)
Total		439	(25)

International career
1997–2002	Slovenia	38	(3)
- * Club domestic league appearances and goals

Željko Milinovič (born 12 October 1969) is a Slovenian former professional footballer who played as a defender. He represented his country at the two major tournaments for which they qualified, the Euro 2000 and the World Cup 2002.

== Club career ==
Born in Ljubljana, Milinovič began his football career with local side Slovan. After half of the 1991–92 season he moved to Olimpija Ljubljana, where he won three consecutive Slovenian Championships and one Slovenian Cup. After a season at Ljubljana, he moved to Maribor. There, he won two consecutive Slovenian Championships and one Slovenian Cup. He had a few successful spells abroad, namely in Austria (LASK Linz and Grazer AK) and Japan (JEF United Ichihara).

== International career ==
Milinovič was capped 38 times and scored three goals for Slovenia. He was a participant at the Euro 2000 and World Cup 2002. His final international was at the latter tournament, against Paraguay.

== Career statistics ==
=== Club ===
Appearances and goals by club, season and competition
Club	Season	League			National Cup		League Cup		Total	
Club	Season	Division	Apps	Goals	Apps	Goals	Apps	Goals	Apps	Goals
Slovan	1991–92	PrvaLiga	17	0					17	0
Olimpija	1991–92	PrvaLiga	10	2					10	2
Olimpija	1992–93	PrvaLiga	20	2					20	2
Olimpija	1993–94	PrvaLiga	20	0					20	0
Olimpija	Total		50	4					50	4
Ljubljana	1994–95	PrvaLiga	25	1					25	1
Maribor	1995–96	PrvaLiga	33	1					33	1
Maribor	1996–97	PrvaLiga	32	1					32	1
Maribor	1997–98	PrvaLiga	34	1					34	1
Maribor	Total		99	3					99	3
LASK	1998–99	Austrian Bundesliga	33	4					33	4
LASK	1999–2000	Austrian Bundesliga	32	2					32	2
LASK	Total		65	6					65	6
Grazer AK	2000–01	Austrian Bundesliga	19	1					19	1
JEF United Ichihara	2001	J1 League	26	3	3	0	5	1	34	4
JEF United Ichihara	2002	J1 League	25	3	4	0	4	2	33	5
JEF United Ichihara	2003	J1 League	26	2	3	0	2	0	31	2
JEF United Ichihara	2004	J1 League	26	0	1	0	5	0	32	0
JEF United Ichihara	Total		103	8	11	0	16	3	130	11
LASK	2004–05	First League	15	0					15	0
LASK	2005–06	First League	31	0					31	0
LASK	Total		46	0					46	0
Olimpija	2006–07		15	2					15	2
Career total			439	25	11	0	16	3	466	28

=== International ===
Slovenia national team
Year	Apps	Goals
1997	1	0
1998	2	0
1999	9	0
2000	11	2
2001	8	1
2002	7	0
Total	38	3

=== International goals ===
Scores and results list Slovenia's goal tally first.

#	Date	Venue	Opponent	Score	Result	Competition
1	26 April 2000	Stade de France, Paris	France	1–0	2–3	Friendly match
2	7 October 2000	Stade Josy Barthel, Luxembourg	Luxembourg	2–0	2–1	FIFA World Cup 2002 qualification
3	5 September 2001	Marakana, Belgrade	FR Yugoslavia	1–0	1–1	FIFA World Cup 2002 qualification

== Honours ==
Olimpija

- Slovenian PrvaLiga: 1991–92, 1992–93, 1993–94
- Slovenian Cup: 1992–93

Maribor

- Slovenian PrvaLiga: 1996–97, 1997–98
- Slovenian Cup: 1996–97

LASK

- Austrian Cup: runner-up 1999–2000

== See also ==
- Slovenian international players
- NK Maribor players
