= Akihiro Tabata =

Japanese footballer

Akihiro Tabata 田畑 昭宏
Personal information
- Full name: Akihiro Tabata
- Date of birth: May 15, 1978 (age 48)
- Place of birth: Saitama, Japan
- Height: 1.85 m (6 ft 1 in)
- Positions: Defender; midfielder

Youth career
- 1994–1996: Seibudai High School

Senior career*
Years	Team	Apps	(Gls)
1997–2001	Urawa Reds	24	(0)
2001–2002	JEF United Ichihara	8	(0)
2003–2005	Consadole Sapporo	77	(5)
Total		109	(5)
- * Club domestic league appearances and goals

Akihiro Tabata (田畑 昭宏, Tabata Akihiro; born May 15, 1978) is a former Japanese football player.

== Playing career ==
Tabata was born in Saitama Prefecture on May 15, 1978. After graduating from high school, he joined his local club Urawa Reds in 1997. He played many matches as a center back from his first season. However, his opportunity to play decreased since 1998. In June 2001, he moved to JEF United Ichihara. However, he could hardly play in the matches. In 2003, he moved to J2 League club Consadole Sapporo. Although he could hardly play in the matches in 2003, he became a regular player as a defensive midfielder in 2004. His opportunity to play decreased in late 2005 and he retired at the end of the 2005 season.

== Career statistics ==
Appearances and goals by club, season and competition
Club	Season	League			Emperor's Cup		J.League Cup		Total	
Club	Season	Division	Apps	Goals	Apps	Goals	Apps	Goals	Apps	Goals
Urawa Reds	1997	J1 League	19	0	0	0	6	1	25	1
Urawa Reds	1998	J1 League	5	0	1	0	0	0	6	0
Urawa Reds	1999	J1 League	0	0	0	0	6	0	0	0
Urawa Reds	2000	J2 League	0	0	0	0	0	0	0	0
Urawa Reds	2001	J1 League	0	0	0	0	0	0	0	0
JEF United Ichihara	2001	J1 League	5	0	0	0	1	0	6	0
JEF United Ichihara	2002	J1 League	3	0	0	0	1	0	4	0
Consadole Sapporo	2003	J2 League	7	0	2	0	—		9	0
Consadole Sapporo	2004	J2 League	38	3	2	0	—		40	3
Consadole Sapporo	2005	J2 League	32	2	0	0	—		32	2
Career total			109	5	5	0	14	1	128	6
