= Yuichi Mizutani =

Japanese footballer

Yuichi Mizutani 水谷 雄一
Personal information
- Full name: Yuichi Mizutani
- Date of birth: May 26, 1980 (age 46)
- Place of birth: Tokyo, Japan
- Height: 1.87 m (6 ft 1 1/2 in)
- Position: Goalkeeper

Youth career
- 1996–1998: Shimizu Commercial High School
- 1999: Kanto Gakuin University

Senior career*
Years	Team	Apps	(Gls)
1999–2000	Shonan Bellmare	22	(0)
2001–2006	Avispa Fukuoka	144	(0)
2002	→Cerezo Osaka (loan)	0	(0)
2007	Kashiwa Reysol	1	(0)
2008–2012	Kyoto Sanga FC	157	(0)
2013	Avispa Fukuoka	13	(0)
2014	Kataller Toyama	12	(0)
Total		349	(0)
Medal record
Kyoto Sanga FC
Runner-up	Emperor's Cup	2011
- * Club domestic league appearances and goals

Yuichi Mizutani (水谷 雄一, Mizutani Yuichi; born May 26, 1980) is a former Japanese football player.

== Playing career ==
Mizutani was born in Tokyo on May 26, 1980.

After dropping out from Kanto Gakuin University, he joined J1 League club Bellmare Hiratsuka (later Shonan Bellmare) in August 1999. Although he debuted in October 1999, the club was relegated to J2 League from 2000. In 2000, he battled with new member Yuji Ito to be regular goalkeeper and he played many matches. In 2001, he moved to Avispa Fukuoka. However, he could not play at all, and the club was relegated to J2 from 2002. In 2002, he moved to J2 club Cerezo Osaka on loan, and again could not play at all. In 2003, he returned to Avispa Fukuoka. In 2003, he battled with Hideki Tsukamoto for the position and played many matches. From 2004, he became a regular goalkeeper and the club was promoted to J1 from 2006.

In 2007, he moved to Kashiwa Reysol. However he could hardly play matches behind Yuta Minami. In 2008, he moved to Kyoto Sanga FC. He played many matches as regular goalkeeper. In late 2010, he could not play matches at all behind Tatsuya Morita and the club was relegated to J2 from 2011. From 2011, he became a regular goalkeeper again. In 2013, he moved to J2 club Avispa Fukuoka for the first time in 7 years. Although he played as regular goalkeeper, he got hurt in June and could hardly play after that. In 2014, he moved to J2 club Kataller Toyama. Although he played as regular goalkeeper initially, he could not play at all behind Tatsumi Iida and Ryotaro Hironaga from June and he retired at the end of the 2014 season.

== Career statistics ==
Appearances and goals by club, season and competition
Club	Season	League			Emperor's Cup		J.League Cup		Total	
Club	Season	Division	Apps	Goals	Apps	Goals	Apps	Goals	Apps	Goals
Bellmare Hiratsuka	1999	J1 League	3	0	0	0	0	0	3	0
Shonan Bellmare	2000	J2 League	19	0	0	0	2	0	21	0
Avispa Fukuoka	2001	J1 League	0	0	0	0	0	0	0	0
Cerezo Osaka	2002	J2 League	0	0	0	0	—		0	0
Avispa Fukuoka	2003	J2 League	24	0	3	0	—		27	0
Avispa Fukuoka	2004	J2 League	43	0	1	0	—		44	0
Avispa Fukuoka	2005	J2 League	44	0	0	0	—		44	0
Avispa Fukuoka	2006	J1 League	33	0	0	0	0	0	33	0
Kashiwa Reysol	2007	J1 League	1	0	1	0	1	0	3	0
Kyoto Sanga FC	2008	J1 League	26	0	2	0	3	0	31	0
Kyoto Sanga FC	2009	J1 League	34	0	2	0	6	0	42	0
Kyoto Sanga FC	2010	J1 League	17	0	1	0	1	0	19	0
Kyoto Sanga FC	2011	J2 League	38	0	6	0	—		44	0
Kyoto Sanga FC	2012	J2 League	42	0	2	0	—		44	0
Avispa Fukuoka	2013	J2 League	13	0	0	0	—		13	0
Kataller Toyama	2014	J2 League	12	0	0	0	—		12	0
Career total			349	0	18	0	13	0	380	0
