= 2005 J.League Cup =

J.League Yamazaki Nabisco Cup

Tournament details
- Country: Japan
- Dates: 19 March and 5 November 2005

Final positions
- Champions: JEF United Chiba (1st title)
- Runners-up: Gamba Osaka
- Semifinalists: Yokohama F. Marinos; Urawa Red Diamonds

The 2005 J.League Cup, officially the 2005 J.League Yamazaki Nabisco Cup, was the 3rd edition of Japan association football league cup tournament and the 13th edition under the current J.League Cup format. The competition started on March 19, and finished on November 5, 2005.

Teams from the J1 took part in the tournament. Yokohama F. Marinos and Júbilo Iwata were given a bye to the quarter-final due to their qualification for the AFC Champions League. The rest of 16 teams started from the group stage, where they're divided into four groups. The group winners of each group qualifies for the quarter-final along with the 2 best runners-up, and the two teams which qualified for the AFC Champions League.

== Group stage ==
=== Group A ===
Team	Pld	W	D	L	GF	GA	GD	Pts
Urawa Red Diamonds	6	5	0	1	10	7	+3	15
Omiya Ardija	6	3	1	2	9	6	+3	10
Albirex Niigata	6	3	1	2	7	5	+2	10
Vissel Kobe	6	0	0	6	1	9	−8	0

2005-03-19
Vissel Kobe	1–2	Urawa Red Diamonds
Omiya Ardija	2–0	Albirex Niigata
2005-03-26
Albirex Niigata	1–0	Vissel Kobe
Urawa Red Diamonds	2–1	Omiya Ardija
2005-05-21
Urawa Red Diamonds	2–1	Albirex Niigata
Vissel Kobe	0–1	Omiya Ardija
2005-05-28
Albirex Niigata	1–1	Omiya Ardija
Urawa Red Diamonds	1–0	Vissel Kobe
2005-06-04
Omiya Ardija	1–3	Urawa Red Diamonds
Vissel Kobe	0–1	Albirex Niigata
2005-06-11
Omiya Ardija	3–0	Vissel Kobe
Albirex Niigata	3–0	Urawa Red Diamonds

=== Group B ===
Team	Pld	W	D	L	GF	GA	GD	Pts
Gamba Osaka	6	4	1	1	17	12	+5	13
Kawasaki Frontale	6	2	3	1	16	12	+4	9
Tokyo Verdy 1969	6	1	3	2	12	14	−2	6
Sanfrecce Hiroshima	6	1	1	4	8	15	−7	4

2005-03-19
Gamba Osaka	4–2	Sanfrecce Hiroshima
Tokyo Verdy 1969	4–4	Kawasaki Frontale
2005-03-26
Kawasaki Frontale	2–2	Gamba Osaka
Sanfrecce Hiroshima	0–1	Tokyo Verdy 1969
2005-05-21
Gamba Osaka	5–3	Tokyo Verdy 1969
Sanfrecce Hiroshima	1–4	Kawasaki Frontale
2005-05-28
Gamba Osaka	3–2	Kawasaki Frontale
Tokyo Verdy 1969	2–2	Sanfrecce Hiroshima
2005-06-04
Sanfrecce Hiroshima	2–1	Gamba Osaka
Kawasaki Frontale	1–1	Tokyo Verdy 1969
2005-06-11
Tokyo Verdy 1969	1–2	Gamba Osaka
Kawasaki Frontale	3–1	Sanfrecce Hiroshima

=== Group C ===
Team	Pld	W	D	L	GF	GA	GD	Pts
JEF United Chiba	6	4	1	1	14	7	+7	13
Kashiwa Reysol	6	2	2	2	6	8	−2	8
Ōita Trinita	6	1	3	2	3	6	−3	6
FC Tokyo	6	1	2	3	5	7	−2	5

2005-03-19
Kashiwa Reysol	3–1	FC Tokyo
Ōita Trinita	1–3	JEF United Chiba
2005-03-26
FC Tokyo	0–0	Ōita Trinita
JEF United Chiba	1–2	Kashiwa Reysol
2005-05-21
Kashiwa Reysol	0–1	Ōita Trinita
FC Tokyo	0–1	JEF United Chiba
2005-05-28
Kashiwa Reysol	1–5	JEF United Chiba
Ōita Trinita	0–2	FC Tokyo
2005-06-04
JEF United Chiba	1–1	Ōita Trinita
FC Tokyo	0–0	Kashiwa Reysol
2005-06-11
JEF United Chiba	3–2	FC Tokyo
Ōita Trinita	0–0	Kashiwa Reysol

=== Group D ===
Team	Pld	W	D	L	GF	GA	GD	Pts
Shimizu S-Pulse	6	3	2	1	12	7	+5	11
Cerezo Osaka	6	3	1	2	10	8	+2	10
Nagoya Grampus Eight	6	2	1	3	5	8	−3	7
Kashima Antlers	6	1	2	3	7	11	−4	5

2005-03-19
Shimizu S-Pulse	1–1	Kashima Antlers
Nagoya Grampus Eight	1–2	Cerezo Osaka
2005-03-26
Kashima Antlers	2–1	Nagoya Grampus Eight
Cerezo Osaka	0–2	Shimizu S-Pulse
2005-05-21
Kashima Antlers	1–3	Cerezo Osaka
Nagoya Grampus Eight	0–3	Shimizu S-Pulse
2005-05-28
Nagoya Grampus Eight	1–0	Kashima Antlers
Shimizu S-Pulse	3–2	Cerezo Osaka
2005-06-04
Kashima Antlers	3–3	Shimizu S-Pulse
Cerezo Osaka	1–1	Nagoya Grampus Eight
2005-06-11
Shimizu S-Pulse	0–1	Nagoya Grampus Eight
Cerezo Osaka	2–0	Kashima Antlers

== Knockout stage ==
=== Quarter finals ===
==== First leg ====
2005-08-06
18:30

JEF United Chiba	3–2	Júbilo Iwata
Hanyu 6'; Nakajima 30'; Yoda 84'		Maeda 44'; Kikuchi 88'

Tokyo National Stadium
Attendance: 10,522
Referee: Hajime Matsuo

2005-08-06
19:00

Cerezo Osaka	0–3	Gamba Osaka
		Sidiclei 18'; Hashimoto 54'; Ienaga 86'

Nagai Stadium
Attendance: 12,863
Referee: Tsutomu Anazawa

2005-08-06
19:00

Shimizu S-Pulse	0–1	Urawa Red Diamonds
		Hasebe 36'

Nihondaira Sports Stadium
Attendance: 12,572
Referee: Yoshitsugu Katayama

2005-08-06
19:05

Omiya Ardija	0–1	Yokohama F. Marinos
		Kurihara 85'

Kumagaya Athletic Stadium
Attendance: 9,525
Referee: Joji Kashihara

==== Second leg ====
2005-08-13
19:00

Gamba Osaka	2–2	Cerezo Osaka
Fernandinho 17'; Araújo 89'		Ze Carlos 7'; Furuhashi 62'

Osaka Expo '70 Stadium
Attendance: 11,155
Referee: Toru Kamikawa

2005-08-13
19:05

Júbilo Iwata	2–2	JEF United Chiba
Maeda 60'; Kim Jin-Kyu 68'		Maki 35'; Abe 65'

Yamaha Stadium
Attendance: 9,574
Referee: Masayoshi Okada

2005-08-14
18:05

Urawa Red Diamonds	1–0	Shimizu S-Pulse
Hasebe 88'

Saitama Stadium
Attendance: 31,754
Referee: Kazuhiko Matsumura

2005-08-14
19:00

Yokohama F. Marinos	3–1	Omiya Ardija
Sakata 15'; Matsuda 60'; Shimizu 85'		Nishimura 29'

Mitsuzawa Stadium
Attendance: 10,165
Referee: Kiyoshi Ota

=== Semi finals ===
==== First leg ====
2005-08-31
19:05

Gamba Osaka	1–0	Yokohama F. Marinos
Araújo 82'

Osaka Expo '70 Stadium
Attendance: 7,049
Referee: Hiroyoshi Takayama

2005-08-31
19:00

Urawa Red Diamonds	1–3	JEF United Chiba
Ponte 44'		Maki 1', 17'; Popescu 55'

Urawa Komaba Stadium
Attendance: 17,265
Referee: Kazuhisa Osada

==== Second leg ====
2005-10-05
19:05

JEF United Chiba	2–2	Urawa Red Diamonds
Abe 47', 86'		Tulio 19'; Tanaka 27'

Ichihara Seaside Stadium
Attendance: 11,286
Referee: Toru Kamikawa

2005-10-05
19:00

Yokohama F. Marinos	1–0 (a.e.t.)	Gamba Osaka
Nasu 30'
Penalties
Yamase (penalty missed); Ohashi (penalty missed); Dutra (penalty scored)	1–4	(penalty scored) Endo; (penalty scored) Araújo; (penalty scored) Matsunami; (penalty scored) Oguro

Nissan Stadium
Attendance: 11,370
Referee: Toshimitsu Yoshida

=== Final ===
2005-11-05
13:07

JEF United Chiba	0–0 (a.e.t.)	Gamba Osaka
Penalties
Abe (penalty scored); Mizuno (penalty scored); Kudo (penalty scored); Hayashi (penalty scored); Maki (penalty scored)	5–4	(penalty missed) Endo; (penalty scored) Araújo; (penalty scored) Sidiclei; (penalty scored) Oguro; (penalty scored) Yamaguchi

Tokyo National Stadium
Attendance: 45,039
Referee: Kazuhiko Matsumura

== Top goalscorers ==
Goalscorers	Goals	Team
(Brazil) Araújo	6	Gamba Osaka
(Brazil) Emerson	5	Urawa Red Diamonds
(Japan) Yuki Abe	5	JEF United Chiba
(Romania) Popescu	5	JEF United Chiba
(Brazil) Washington	5	Tokyo Verdy 1969

== Awards ==
- MVP: (Japan) Tomonori Tateishi (JEF United Chiba)
- New Hero Prize: (Japan) Yuki Abe (JEF United Chiba)
