= Takuya Shiihara =

Japanese footballer (born 1980)

Takuya Shiihara 椎原 拓也
Personal information
- Full name: Takuya Shiihara
- Date of birth: July 9, 1980 (age 46)
- Place of birth: Kagoshima, Kagoshima, Japan
- Height: 1.78 m (5 ft 10 in)
- Position: Midfielder

Youth career
- 1996–1998: Kagoshima Jitsugyo High School

Senior career*
Years	Team	Apps	(Gls)
1999–2003	Osaka Gas		
2004	JEF United Ichihara	0	(0)
2006–2008	Mito HollyHock	88	(2)
Total		88	(2)
- * Club domestic league appearances and goals

Takuya Shiihara (椎原 拓也, Shiihara Takuya; born July 9, 1980) is a Japanese former football player.

== Career statistics ==
Appearances and goals by club, season and competition
Club	Season	League			Emperor's Cup		J.League Cup		Total	
Club	Season	Division	Apps	Goals	Apps	Goals	Apps	Goals	Apps	Goals
JEF United Ichihara	2004	J1 League	0	0	0	0	0	0	0	0
Mito HollyHock	2006	J2 League	41	2	1	0	—		42	2
Mito HollyHock	2007	J2 League	36	0	0	0	—		36	0
Mito HollyHock	2008	J2 League	11	0	0	0	—		11	0
Career total			88	2	1	0	0	0	89	2
