= Diego Souza (footballer, born 1984) =

Brazilian footballer

Personal information
- Full name: Diego de Souza Gama Silva
- Date of birth: 22 March 1984 (age 42)
- Place of birth: São Paulo, Brazil
- Height: 1.84 m (6 ft 0 in)
- Position: Midfielder

Team information
- Current team: Operário-MS (head coach)

Youth career
- 1997–1998: Corinthians
- 1999–2001: Palmeiras

Senior career*
Years	Team	Apps	(Gls)
2002–2007	Palmeiras	86	(10)
2002	→ Joinville (loan)	0	(0)
2005	→ Vissel Kobe (loan)	0	(0)
2006	→ Kashiwa Reysol (loan)	43	(21)
2007	→ Tokyo Verdy (loan)	47	(13)
2008	Tokyo Verdy	29	(11)
2009–2011	Kyoto Sanga	74	(15)
2011	Vegalta Sendai	5	(0)
2012	Portuguesa	7	(1)
2012–2013	Lobos BUAP	29	(5)
2013	América de Natal		
2014–2016	Montedio Yamagata	114	(32)
2017	Volta Redonda	11	(1)
2017–2019	Taboão da Serra	33	(9)
2018	→ Vitória da Conquista (loan)	6	(0)

International career
2003	Brazil U20	5	(1)

Managerial career
- 2019–2020: Taboão da Serra U20
- 2024: Nacional-SP (assistant)
- 2024: Nacional-SP
- 2024: Tupã
- 2025: Taquaritinga
- 2025–2026: Bataguassu
- 2026–: Operário-MS
- * Club domestic league appearances and goals

Diego de Souza Gama Silva (born 22 March 1984), known as Diego Souza, is a Brazilian football coach and former player who played as a midfielder. He is the current head coach of Operário-MS.

== Career statistics ==
As of 23 February 2016

Appearances and goals by club, season and competition
Club	Season	League		National cup (Note: Includes Emperor's Cup.)		League cup (Note: Includes J. League Cup.)		AFC		Other		Total	
Club	Season	Apps	Goals	Apps	Goals	Apps	Goals	Apps	Goals	Apps	Goals	Apps	Goals
Vissel Kobe	2005	0	0	0	0	0	0	–		–		0	0
Kashiwa Reysol	2006	43	21	0	0	–		–		–		43	21
Tokyo Verdy	2007	47	13	0	0	–		–		–		47	13
Tokyo Verdy	2008	29	11	1	0	4	0	–		–		34	11
Kyoto Sanga	2009	33	9	2	1	6	0	–		–		41	10
Kyoto Sanga	2010	33	6	2	1	6	3	–		–		41	10
Kyoto Sanga	2011	8	0	0	0	–		–		–		8	0
Vegalta Sendai	2011	5	0	2	0	0	0	–		–		7	0
Montedio Yamagata	2014	40	14	4	0	–		–		–		44	14
Montedio Yamagata	2015	34	10	3	3	2	0	–		–		39	13
Montedio Yamagata	2016	40	8	3	3	–		–		–		43	11
Career total		312	92	17	8	18	3	0	0	0	0	347	103

== Honours ==
Palmeiras

- Brazilian Série B: 2003
