= Zdenko Verdenik =

Slovenian football manager (born 1949)

Personal information
- Date of birth: 2 May 1949 (age 77)
- Place of birth: Ptuj, FPR Yugoslavia
- Position: Winger

Senior career*
Years	Team	Apps	(Gls)
- Svoboda Ljubljana
- Železničar Maribor
- Slovan

Managerial career
- 1984–1985: Olimpija
- 1993–1994: Slovenia U21
- 1994–1997: Slovenia
- 1995: Olimpija
- 1998–1999: Austria Wien
- 2000–2001: JEF United Ichihara
- 2002–2003: Nagoya Grampus Eight
- 2003–2004: Vegalta Sendai
- 2010–2011: Interblock
- 2012–2013: Omiya Ardija
- * Club domestic league appearances and goals

Zdenko Verdenik (born 2 May 1949) is a Slovenian football manager and former player who played as a winger.

He coached NK Olimpija, Slovenia under-21 team, Slovenia senior team, FK Austria Wien, JEF United Ichihara, Nagoya Grampus Eight, Vegalta Sendai, and Omiya Ardija.

== Managerial statistics ==
Team	From	To	Record				
Team	From	To	G	W	D	L	Win %
JEF United Ichihara	2000	2001	35	18	2	15	51.43
Nagoya Grampus Eight	2002	2003	45	20	9	16	44.44
Vegalta Sendai	2003	2004	53	17	16	20	32.08
Omiya Ardija	2012	2013	42	18	11	13	42.86
Total			175	73	38	64	41.71
