= Atsutaka Nakamura =

Japanese footballer (born 1990)

Atsutaka Nakamura 中村 充孝
Personal information
- Full name: Atsutaka Nakamura
- Date of birth: 13 September 1990 (age 36)
- Place of birth: Sakai, Osaka, Japan
- Height: 1.73 m (5 ft 8 in)
- Position: Forward

Team information
- Current team: Iwate Grulla Morioka
- Number: 46

Youth career
- 2005–2008: Funabashi Municipal; High School

Senior career*
| Years | Team | Apps | (Gls) |
| 2009–2012 | Kyoto Sanga | 87 | (18) |
| 2013–2019 | Kashima Antlers | 101 | (13) |
| 2020–2021 | Montedio Yamagata | 25 | (3) |
| 2022– | Iwate Grulla Morioka | 54 | (2) |
Medal record
Kyoto Sanga FC
| Runner-up | Emperor's Cup | 2011 |
Kashima Antlers
| Winner | AFC Champions League | 2018 |
| Winner | J1 League | 2016 |
| Runner-up | J1 League | 2017 |
| Winner | J.League Cup | 2015 |
| Winner | Emperor's Cup | 2016 |
- * Club domestic league appearances and goals as of 23:33, 5 September 2024 (UTC)

Atsutaka Nakamura (中村 充孝, Nakamura Atsutaka; born 13 September 1990 in Osaka Prefecture) is a Japanese footballer who plays for Iwate Grulla Morioka.

== Career ==
=== Kyoto Sanga ===
Nakamura made his league debut against Júbilo Iwata on 25 April 2009. He scored his first league goal against Fagiano Okayama on 24 April 2011, scoring in the 3rd minute.

=== Kashima Antlers ===
Nakamura made his league debut against Sagan Tosu on 2 March 2013. He scored his first league goal against Nagoya Grampus on 18 May 2013, scoring in the 66th minute. On 25 September 2019, Nakamura scored his first career hattrick against Yokohama F. Marinos in the Emperor's Cup.

=== Montedio Yamagata ===
On 1 March 2020, Nakamura was announced at Montedio Yamagata. He made his league debut against Machida Zelvia on 4 July 2020. Nakamura scored his first league goal against Thespa Gunma on 15 July 2020, scoring in the 35th minute. On 8 December 2021, it was announced that Montedio Yamagata would not be renewing his contract for the 2022 season.

=== Iwate Grulla Morioka ===
Nakamura made his league debut against JEF United on 19 February 2022. He scored his first league goal against Tokyo Verdy on 12 June 2022, scoring in the 89th minute. On 4 December 2023, it was initially announced that Grulla Morioka would not be renewing Nakamura's contract. However, on 18 January 2024, he resigned with the club.

== Style of play ==
Nakamura has been noted for his defensive work, such as pressing quickly and switching between offense and defence.

== Career statistics ==
=== Club ===
Updated to 23 February 2019.

| Club | Season | League | | Emperor's Cup | | J. League Cup | | AFC | | Other^{1} | | Total | |
| Club | Season | Apps | Goals | Apps | Goals | Apps | Goals | Apps | Goals | Apps | Goals | Apps | Goals |
|---|---|---|---|---|---|---|---|---|---|---|---|---|---|
| Kyoto Sanga | 2009 | 3 | 0 | 0 | 0 | 1 | 0 | – | | – | | 4 | 0 |
| Kyoto Sanga | 2010 | 18 | 1 | 1 | 0 | 0 | 0 | – | | – | | 19 | 1 |
| Kyoto Sanga | 2011 | 25 | 3 | 6 | 1 | – | | – | | – | | 31 | 4 |
| Kyoto Sanga | 2012 | 41 | 14 | 2 | 1 | – | | – | | 1 | 0 | 44 | 15 |
| Kashima Antlers | 2013 | 16 | 3 | 2 | 0 | 6 | 0 | – | | 1 | 0 | 25 | 3 |
| Kashima Antlers | 2014 | 14 | 2 | 1 | 0 | 1 | 0 | – | | – | | 16 | 2 |
| Kashima Antlers | 2015 | 17 | 2 | 0 | 0 | 4 | 1 | 3 | 0 | – | | 24 | 3 |
| Kashima Antlers | 2016 | 17 | 3 | 2 | 0 | 3 | 0 | – | | 5 | 0 | 27 | 3 |
| Kashima Antlers | 2017 | 20 | 1 | 3 | 1 | 2 | 0 | 4 | 0 | – | | 29 | 2 |
| Kashima Antlers | 2018 | 11 | 1 | 1 | 0 | 1 | 0 | 4 | 0 | – | | 17 | 1 |
| Career total | | 162 | 30 | 18 | 3 | 18 | 1 | 11 | 0 | 7 | 0 | 216 | 34 |

^{1}Includes Promotion Playoffs, Suruga Bank Championship, J. League Championship and FIFA Club World Cup.

== Honours ==
=== Club ===
Kyoto Sanga

- Emperor's Cup Runner-up : 2011

Kashima Antlers

- J1 League (1): 2016
- Emperor's Cup (1): 2016
- J. League Cup (1): 2015
- Japanese Super Cup (1): 2017
- Suruga Bank Championship (1): 2013
- AFC Champions League (1): 2018
