= Yuta Someya =

Japanese footballer

Yuta Someya 染谷 悠太
Personal information
- Full name: Yuta Someya
- Date of birth: September 30, 1986 (age 40)
- Place of birth: Tokyo, Japan
- Height: 1.84 m (6 ft 1/2 in)
- Position: Centre back

Youth career
- 1999–2004: FC Tokyo Youth
- 2005–2008: Ryutsu Keizai University

Senior career*
Years	Team	Apps	(Gls)
2009–2013	Kyoto Sanga	93	(2)
2014–2015	Cerezo Osaka	50	(0)
2016–2018	Kyoto Sanga	88	(1)
2019–2022	Kashiwa Reysol	55	(2)
Medal record
Kyoto Sanga FC
Runner-up	Emperor's Cup	2011
Kashiwa Reysol
Winner	J2 League	2019
- * Club domestic league appearances and goals as of 22:21, 1 March 2023 (UTC)

Yuta Someya (染谷 悠太, Someya Yūta; born September 30, 1986 in Tokyo) is a Japanese former professional footballer, He is the currently coach for J1 League club Kashiwa Reysol. who played as a centre-back. Someya came up through the youth teams of FC Tokyo and represented Ryutsu Keizai University in the Japan Football League. He then went on to play over 300 games throughout his professional career, playing for Kyoto Sanga, Cerezo Osaka and Kashiwa Reysol. He retired from playing at the end of the 2022 season and took up a role as a coach in Kashiwa Reysol's academy.

== Career statistics ==
Appearances and goals by club, season and competition
Club performance			League		Cup		League Cup		Continental		Other (Note: Appearances in J1/J2 play-offs)		Total	
Season	Club	League	Apps	Goals	Apps	Goals	Apps	Goals	Apps	Goals	Apps	Goals	Apps	Goals
Japan			League		Emperor's Cup		J. League Cup		AFC		Other		Total	
2005	Ryutsu Keizai University	JFL	11	0	0	0	-		-		-		11	0
2006	Ryutsu Keizai University	JFL	13	0	0	0	-		-		-		13	0
2007	Ryutsu Keizai University	JFL	23	0	0	0	-		-		-		23	0
2008	Ryutsu Keizai University	JFL	5	0	0	0	-		-		-		5	0
2009	Kyoto Sanga	J1 League	19	1	1	0	4	0	-	-	-		24	1
2010	Kyoto Sanga	J1 League	10	0	1	0	1	0	-	-	-		12	0
2011	Kyoto Sanga	J2 League	8	0	0	0	0	0	-	-	-		8	0
2012	Kyoto Sanga	J2 League	27	0	1	0	-	-	-	-	1	0	29	0
2013	Kyoto Sanga	J2 League	27	1	1	0	-	-	-	-	1	0	29	1
2014	Cerezo Osaka	J1 League	14	0	0	0	0	0	5	0	-		19	0
2015	Cerezo Osaka	J2 League	36	0	1	0	-		-		-		37	0
2016	Kyoto Sanga	J2 League	17	0	1	0	-		-		-		18	0
2017	Kyoto Sanga	J2 League	31	0	1	0	-		-		-		32	0
2018	Kyoto Sanga	J2 League	40	1	0	0	-		-		-		40	1
2019	Kashiwa Reysol	J2 League	37	2	1	0	2	0	-		-		40	2
2020	Kashiwa Reysol	J1 League	6	0	0	0	1	0	-		-		7	0
2021	Kashiwa Reysol	J1 League	10	0	0	0	2	0	-		-		12	0
2022	Kashiwa Reysol	J1 League	2	0	1	0	2	0	-		-		5	0
Career total			336	5	9	0	12	0	5	0	2	0	364	5

== Honours ==
Kashiwa Reysol

- J2 League: 2019
