= Hiroki Nakayama =

Japanese footballer

Hiroki Nakayama 中山 博貴
Personal information
- Full name: Hiroki Nakayama
- Date of birth: December 13, 1985 (age 40)
- Place of birth: Kagoshima, Japan
- Height: 1.77 m (5 ft 9 1/2 in)
- Position: Midfielder

Youth career
- 2001–2003: Kagoshima Josei High School

Senior career*
Years	Team	Apps	(Gls)
2004–2015	Kyoto Sanga FC	221	(21)
Total		221	(21)
Medal record
Kyoto Sanga FC
Runner-up	Emperor's Cup	2011
Representing Japan
AFC U-19 Championship
Bronze medal – third place	2004 Malaysia
- * Club domestic league appearances and goals

Hiroki Nakayama (中山 博貴, Nakayama Hiroki; born December 13, 1986) is a former Japanese football player.

== Career statistics ==
Appearances and goals by club, season and competition
Club	Season	League			Emperor's Cup		J.League Cup		Total	
Club	Season	Division	Apps	Goals	Apps	Goals	Apps	Goals	Apps	Goals
Kyoto Purple Sanga	2004	J2 League	19	3	0	0	—		19	3
Kyoto Purple Sanga	2005	J2 League	2	0	1	0	—		3	0
Kyoto Purple Sanga	2006	J1 League	11	2	1	0	2	0	14	2
Kyoto Sanga FC	2007	J2 League	19	3	1	0	—		20	3
Kyoto Sanga FC	2008	J1 League	14	0	1	0	6	0	21	0
Kyoto Sanga FC	2009	J1 League	8	1	2	0	1	0	11	1
Kyoto Sanga FC	2010	J1 League	29	1	2	0	5	0	36	1
Kyoto Sanga FC	2011	J2 League	35	5	5	1	—		40	6
Kyoto Sanga FC	2012	J2 League	39	6	2	1	—		41	7
Kyoto Sanga FC	2013	J2 League	16	0	0	0	—		16	0
Kyoto Sanga FC	2014	J2 League	28	0	2	1	—		30	1
Kyoto Sanga FC	2015	J2 League	1	0	0	0	—		1	0
Career total			221	21	17	3	14	0	252	24
