= Takumi Miyayoshi =

Japanese footballer

Takumi Miyayoshi 宮吉 拓実
Personal information
- Full name: Takumi Miyayoshi
- Date of birth: 7 August 1992 (age 34)
- Place of birth: Shiga, Japan
- Height: 1.73 m (5 ft 8 in)
- Position: Forward

Team information
- Current team: Renofa Yamaguchi
- Number: 13

Youth career
- Shoan SS
- –2004: FC Lago
- 2005–2008: Kyoto Sanga

Senior career*
Years	Team	Apps	(Gls)
2008–2015	Kyoto Sanga	139	(28)
2014	→ Kataller Toyama (loan)	16	(3)
2016–2017	Sanfrecce Hiroshima	21	(4)
2018	Hokkaido Consadole Sapporo	11	(1)
2019–2024	Kyoto Sanga	102	(18)
2025–	Renofa Yamaguchi	11	(0)

International career^{‡}
2008–2009	Japan U-17	6	(6)
Medal record
Kyoto Sanga FC
Runner-up	Emperor's Cup	2011
- * Club domestic league appearances and goals as of 1 January 2026 ‡ National team caps and goals as of 30 October 2009

Takumi Miyayoshi (宮吉 拓実, Miyayoshi Takumi; born 7 August 1992 in Shiga) is a Japanese football player currently playing for Renofa Yamaguchi.

== National team career ==
In October 2009, Miyayoshi was elected Japan U-17 national team for 2009 U-17 World Cup. He played 2 matches and scored 2 goals against Switzerland.

== Career statistics ==
=== Club ===
Updated to 21 July 2022.

Club	Season	League			Cup^{1}		League Cup^{2}		Asia^{3}		Total	
Club	Season	Division	Apps	Goals	Apps	Goals	Apps	Goals	Apps	Goals	Apps	Goals
Kyoto Sanga FC	2008	J1 League	2	0	1	0	0	0	–		3	0
Kyoto Sanga FC	2009	J1 League	2	0	1	1	0	0	–		3	1
Kyoto Sanga FC	2010	J1 League	14	3	0	0	5	1	–		19	4
Kyoto Sanga FC	2011	J2 League	27	7	6	5	–		–		33	12
Kyoto Sanga FC	2012	J2 League	39	11	2	0	–		–		41	11
Kyoto Sanga FC	2013	J2 League	18	3	0	0	–		–		18	3
Kyoto Sanga FC	2014	J2 League	4	0	0	0	–		–		4	0
Kataller Toyama	2014	J2 League	16	3	–		–		–		16	3
Kyoto Sanga FC	2015	J2 League	33	4	2	2	–		–		35	6
Sanfrecce Hiroshima	2016	J1 League	13	4	1	0	0	0	5	1	19	5
Sanfrecce Hiroshima	2017	J1 League	8	0	1	1	3	1	–		12	2
Hokkaido Consadole Sapporo	2018	J1 League	11	1	2	0	6	1	–		19	2
Kyoto Sanga FC	2019	J2 League	26	4	1	0	–		–		27	4
Kyoto Sanga FC	2020	J2 League	22	1	–		–		–		22	1
Kyoto Sanga FC	2021	J2 League	30	10	0	0	–		–		30	10
Kyoto Sanga FC	2022	J1 League	13	2	3	0	2	0	–		18	2
Career total			278	53	20	9	16	3	5	1	319	66

^{1}Includes Emperor's Cup.

^{2}Includes J. League Cup.

^{3}Includes AFC Champions League.

=== International goals ===
Scores and results list Japan's goal tally first.

==== Under-17 ====
#	Date	Venue	Opponent	Score	Result	Competition
1.	5 October 2008	MHSK Stadium, Tashkent, Uzbekistan	Malaysia	4–0	4–0	2008 AFC U-17 Championship
2.	7 October 2008	MHSK Stadium, Tashkent, Uzbekistan	United Arab Emirates	1–0	6–1	2008 AFC U-17 Championship
3.	7 October 2008	MHSK Stadium, Tashkent, Uzbekistan	United Arab Emirates	2–0	6–1	2008 AFC U-17 Championship
4.	7 October 2008	MHSK Stadium, Tashkent, Uzbekistan	United Arab Emirates	3–0	6–1	2008 AFC U-17 Championship
5.	27 October 2009	Teslim Balogun Stadium, Lagos, Nigeria	Switzerland	1–0	3–4	2009 FIFA U-17 World Cup
6.	27 October 2009	Teslim Balogun Stadium, Lagos, Nigeria	Switzerland	2–0	3–4	2009 FIFA U-17 World Cup

=== Appearances in major competitions ===
Team	Competition	Category	Appearances		Goals	Team record
Team	Competition	Category	Start	Sub	Goals	Team record
Japan U-17	2008 AFC U-17 Championship	U-16	2	2	4	Semifinals
Japan U-17	2009 FIFA U-17 World Cup	U-17	1	1	2	Round 1
