= Jun Ando =

Japanese footballer

Jun Ando 安藤淳
Personal information
- Full name: Jun Ando
- Date of birth: 8 October 1984 (age 42)
- Place of birth: Yasu, Shiga, Japan
- Height: 1.78 m (5 ft 10 in)
- Positions: Centre back; defensive midfielder

Youth career
- 2000–2002: Shizuoka Gakuen High School
- 2003–2006: Kansai University

Senior career*
Years	Team	Apps	(Gls)
2007–2013	Kyoto Sanga	179	(11)
2014–2015	Cerezo Osaka	15	(1)
2015–2017	Matsumoto Yamaga	42	(1)
2018	Ehime FC	30	(0)
2019–2020	Kyoto Sanga	57	(2)
Medal record
Kyoto Sanga FC
Runner-up	Emperor's Cup	2011
- * Club domestic league appearances and goals as of 1 January 2022

Jun Ando (安藤 淳, Andō Jun; born 8 October 1984 in Shiga) is a retired Japanese footballer who last played for Kyoto Sanga FC.

== Career ==
After more than a decade in J. League, he opted to retire at the end of the 2020 season.

== Career statistics ==
Updated to January 1, 2022.

Club performance			League		Cup		League Cup		Continental		Total	
Season	Club	League	Apps	Goals	Apps	Goals	Apps	Goals	Apps	Goals	Apps	Goals
Japan			League		Emperor's Cup		League Cup		Asia		Total	
2007	Kyoto Sanga FC	J2 League	5	0	1	0	–		–		6	0
2008	Kyoto Sanga FC	J1 League	15	1	2	1	0	0	–		17	2
2009	Kyoto Sanga FC	J1 League	32	1	1	0	3	0	–		36	1
2010	Kyoto Sanga FC	J1 League	26	1	0	0	5	0	–		31	1
2011	Kyoto Sanga FC	J2 League	22	1	5	0	–		–		27	1
2012	Kyoto Sanga FC	J2 League	42	3	2	0	–		–		44	3
2013	Kyoto Sanga FC	J2 League	36	4	1	0	–		–		37	4
2014	Cerezo Osaka	J1 League	11	1	2	0	0	0	3	0	16	1
2015	Cerezo Osaka	J2 League	4	0	0	0	-		-		4	0
2015	Matsumoto Yamaga	J1 League	15	1	3	2	–		–		18	3
2016	Matsumoto Yamaga	J2 League	16	0	0	0	–		–		16	0
2017	Matsumoto Yamaga	J2 League	11	0	1	0	–		–		12	0
2018	Ehime FC	J2 League	30	0	0	0	–		–		30	0
2019	Kyoto Sanga	J2 League	30	1	0	0	–		–		30	1
2020	Kyoto Sanga	J2 League	27	1	0	0	–		–		27	1
Career total			322	15	18	3	8	0	3	0	359	18
