= ZA Oripri Stadium =

Football stadium in Ichihara, Japan

Coordinates: 35°31′41″N 140°04′18″E

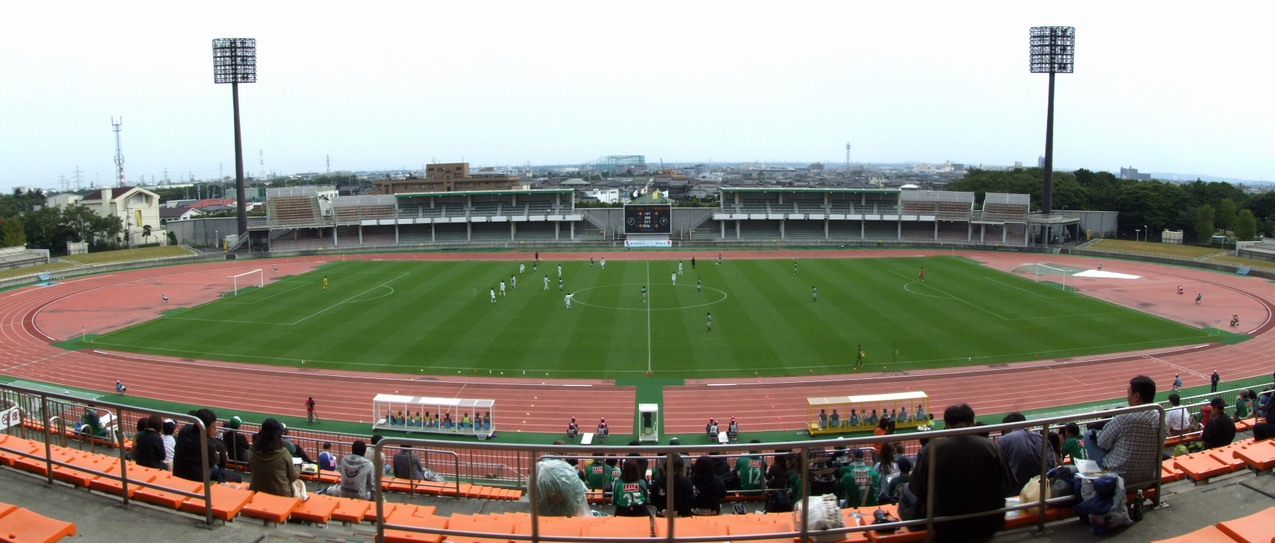
- Interactive map of ZA Oripri Stadium
- Former names: Ichihara Stadium (1993-2013)
- Location: Ichihara, Japan
- Owner: Ichihara City
- Capacity: 14,051
- Surface: Grass
- Field size: 105m × 68m

Construction
- Opened: 1993
- Expanded: 2003

ZA Oripri Stadium (ゼットエーオリプリスタジアム) is a multi-purpose stadium located in Ichihara, Japan. It is the only athletic stadium in Ichihara. Completed in 1987, the stadium consists of a large main stand and several smaller stands in a ring. Approximately 500 seats are covered; the cold Ichihara winds tend to create an uncomfortable experience for most patrons.

It was formerly known as Ichihara Stadium. Since April 2013 it has been called ZA Oripri Stadium for the naming rights.

From 1993 until 2005 the stadium was home to J.League side JEF United Chiba until the club moved to its new home at the Fukuda Denshi Arena in Chiba, it remains to be seen if the club will still use Seaside Stadium as an alternate venue though it is currently used by JEF Reserves, which play football in a regional league.

== See also ==
- JEF United Chiba
- Fukuda Denshi Arena
