= Kohei Kudo (footballer) =

Japanese footballer (born 1984)

Kohei Kudo 工藤 浩平
Personal information
- Full name: Kohei Kudo
- Date of birth: 28 August 1984 (age 42)
- Place of birth: Ichihara, Chiba, Japan
- Height: 1.66 m (5 ft 5 1/2 in)
- Position: Midfielder

Team information
- Current team: Tochigi City FC
- Number: 8

Youth career
- 1995–2002: JEF United Ichihara

Senior career*
Years	Team	Apps	(Gls)
2003–2010	JEF United Chiba	180	(12)
2011–2014	Kyoto Sanga	130	(9)
2015	Sanfrecce Hiroshima	1	(0)
2015–2018	Matsumoto Yamaga	110	(20)
2018–2020	JEF United Chiba	42	(1)
2021–	Tochigi City FC	39	(4)
Total		502	(46)

International career
2001	Japan U-17	3	(0)
Medal record
JEF United Chiba
Winner	J.League Cup	2005
Winner	J.League Cup	2006
Kyoto Sanga
Runner-up	Emperor's Cup	2011
Sanfrecce Hiroshima
Winner	J1 League	2015
Representing Japan
AFC U-19 Championship
Silver medal – second place	2002 Qatar
- * Club domestic league appearances and goals as of start of 2023 season

Kohei Kudo (工藤 浩平, Kudō Kōhei; born August 28, 1984) is a Japanese football player who play as Midfielder. He currently play for Tochigi City FC.

== Club career ==
Kudo was born in Ichihara on August 28, 1984. He joined J1 League club JEF United Ichihara (later JEF United Chiba) from youth team in 2003. He debuted in first season and played many matches as mainly substitute midfielder from 2004 season. JEF United won the champions in 2005 and 2006 J.League Cup. He became a regular as offensive midfielder in 2007. However the club results were sluggish and was relegated to J2 League end of 2009 season first time in the club history.

In 2011, he moved to J2 club Kyoto Sanga FC. Although he could not play at all in the match for injury until August, he came back in September and won the 2nd place in 2011 Emperor's Cup. He played many matches as regular from 2012.

In 2015, he moved to J1 club Sanfrecce Hiroshima. However he could hardly play in the match.

In June 2015, he moved to newly was promoted to J1 League club, Matsumoto Yamaga FC. Although he played many matches, Yamaga finished at the bottom place in 2015 season and was relegated to J2 in a year.

In July 2018, he re-joined J2 club JEF United Chiba for the first time in 7 years.

On 13 January 2021, Kudo announcement officially transfer to Kanto club, Tochigi City FC for ahead of 2021 season.

== National team career ==
In September 2001, Kudo was selected Japan U-17 national team for 2001 U-17 World Championship. He played all 3 matches.

== Career statistics ==
=== Club ===
As of the start of 2023 season.

Club performance			League		Cup		League Cup		Other		Total	
Season	Club	League	Apps	Goals	Apps	Goals	Apps	Goals	Apps	Goals	Apps	Goals
Japan			League		Emperor's Cup		J.League Cup		Other^{1}		Total	
2003	JEF United Ichihara	J. League Div 1	2	0	0	0	1	0	-		3	0
2004	JEF United Ichihara	J. League Div 1	12	1	0	0	5	1	-		17	2
2005	JEF United Chiba	J. League Div 1	24	0	1	1	8	1	-		33	2
2006	JEF United Chiba	J. League Div 1	10	0	1	0	6	0	2	0	19	0
2007	JEF United Chiba	J. League Div 1	33	4	1	0	5	3	-		39	7
2008	JEF United Chiba	J. League Div 1	32	2	1	0	7	0	-		40	2
2009	JEF United Chiba	J. League Div 1	32	3	3	1	6	0	-		41	4
2010	JEF United Chiba	J. League Div 2	35	2	2	0	-		-		37	2
2010	Total		180	12	9	2	38	5	2	0	229	19
2011	Kyoto Sanga	J. League Div 2	11	3	6	1	-		-		17	4
2012	Kyoto Sanga	J. League Div 2	42	4	2	1	-		1	0	45	5
2013	Kyoto Sanga	J. League Div 2	38	2	2	2	-		2	0	42	4
2014	Kyoto Sanga	J. League Div 2	39	0	2	0	-		-		41	0
2014	Total		130	9	12	4	-		3	0	145	13
2015	Sanfrecce Hiroshima	J1 League	1	0	0	0	5	0	-		6	0
2015	Total		1	0	0	0	5	0	-		6	0
2015	Matsumoto Yamaga	J1 League	15	1	4	0	0	0	-		19	1
2016	Matsumoto Yamaga	J2 League	42	11	1	0	–		–		43	11
2017	Matsumoto Yamaga	J2 League	41	8	0	0	–		–		41	8
2018	Matsumoto Yamaga	J2 League	12	0	1	0	–		–		13	0
2018	Total		110	20	6	0	0	0	–		116	20
2018	JEF United Chiba	J2 League	12	0	–						12	0
2019	JEF United Chiba	J2 League	24	1	1	0	–				25	1
2020	JEF United Chiba	J2 League	6	0	–						6	0
2020	Total		36	1	1	0	–				37	1
2021	Tochigi City FC	Kantō Soccer League	22	4	1	0	–				23	4
2022	Tochigi City FC	Kantō Soccer League	17	0	–						17	0
2023	Tochigi City FC	Kantō Soccer League	0	0	0	0	–				0	0
2023	Total		39	4	1	0	–				40	4
Career total			502	46	29	6	43	5	5	0	579	57

^{1}Includes A3 Champions Cup and Promotion Playoffs to J1.

== Honours and awards ==
=== Club ===
JEF United Chiba

- J.League Cup Champions : 2005, 2006

Kyoto Sanga

- Emperor's Cup Runner-up : 2011

Sanfrecce Hiroshima

- J1 League Champions : 2015

=== Youth national team ===
- AFC U-16 Championship : 2000
- FIFA U-17 World Cup : 2001
- AFC Youth Championship : 2002
