= Koji Yamase =

Japanese footballer

Koji Yamase 山瀬 功治
Personal information
- Full name: Koji Yamase
- Date of birth: 22 September 1981 (age 45)
- Place of birth: Sapporo, Hokkaido, Japan
- Height: 1.75 m (5 ft 9 in)
- Position: Midfielder

Youth career
- 1997–1999: Hokkai High School

Senior career*
| Years | Team | Apps | (Gls) |
| 2000–2002 | Consadole Sapporo | 52 | (9) |
| 2003–2004 | Urawa Red Diamonds | 42 | (11) |
| 2005–2010 | Yokohama F. Marinos | 157 | (32) |
| 2011–2012 | Kawasaki Frontale | 33 | (8) |
| 2013–2016 | Kyoto Sanga FC | 128 | (19) |
| 2017–2018 | Avispa Fukuoka | 69 | (7) |
| 2019–2021 | Ehime FC | 97 | (6) |
| 2022–2024 | Renofa Yamaguchi FC | 49 | (3) |

International career
| 2000–2001 | Japan U-20 | 10 | (5) |
| 2004 | Japan U-23 | 2 | (0) |
| 2006–2010 | Japan | 13 | (5) |
Medal record
Urawa Red Diamonds
| Runner-up | J1 League | 2004 |
| Winner | J.League Cup | 2003 |
| Runner-up | J.League Cup | 2004 |
Representing Japan
AFC U-19 Championship
| Silver medal – second place | 2000 Iran |
- * Club domestic league appearances and goals as of 7 January 2022

Koji Yamase (山瀬 功治, Yamase Kōji; born 22 September 1981) is a Japanese football player who plays for Renofa Yamaguchi FC. His father Isao Yamase participated in the 1984 Winter Olympics as a biathlete. His brother Yukihiro Yamase is also a footballer.

== Club career ==
Yamase was born in Sapporo on 22 September 1981. After graduating from high school, he joined J2 League club Consadole Sapporo in his hometown, in 2000. He played many matches as a midfielder from first season under manager Takeshi Okada. Consadole also were the champions in the 2000 season and was promoted to the J1 League. In 2000, he played as a regular player and was selected Rookie of the Year award. Although he was given number a no.10 shirt, he could not play at all in the season because of injuries from summer 2002. Consadole also finished at the bottom place in 2002 season and was relegated to J2.

In 2003, Yamase moved to J1 club Urawa Red Diamonds. Reds won the champions 2003 J.League Cup. In 2004, Reds won the 2nd place in J1 League and J.League Cup.

In 2005, Yamase moved to Yokohama F. Marinos which club won the J1 champions for 2 years in a row until 2004. He was given number 10 shirt and played many matches as offensive midfielder. He spent in this club the longest season in his career.

In 2011, Yamase moved to Kawasaki Frontale. He played all 34 matches in 2011 season. However his opportunity to play decreased in 2012 season.

In 2013, Yamase moved to J2 club Kyoto Sanga FC. He played many matches as regular player until 2016. In 2017, he moved to Avispa Fukuoka and played in 2 seasons. In 2019, he moved to Ehime FC.

== National team career ==
In June 2001, Yamase was selected Japan U-20 national team for 2001 World Youth Championship. At this tournament, he played all 3 matches and scored 2 goals.

Japan's coach Ivica Osim handed him his first senior cap on 9 August 2006, in a friendly match against Trinidad and Tobago. His first goal for Japan came on 22 August 2007 in a friendly match against Cameroon. He played 13 games and scored 5 goals for Japan until 2013.

== Club statistics ==
As of end of 2018 season

| Club | Season | League | | Emperor's Cup | | J.League Cup | | Other (Note: Includes J2 Play-offs) | | Total | |
| Club | Season | Apps | Goals | Apps | Goals | Apps | Goals | Apps | Goals | Apps | Goals |
|---|---|---|---|---|---|---|---|---|---|---|---|
| Consadole Sapporo | 2000 | 14 | 2 | 3 | 0 | 1 | 0 | – | | 18 | 2 |
| Consadole Sapporo | 2001 | 24 | 3 | 1 | 0 | 0 | 0 | – | | 25 | 3 |
| Consadole Sapporo | 2002 | 14 | 4 | 0 | 0 | 2 | 0 | – | | 16 | 4 |
| Urawa Red Diamonds | 2003 | 24 | 6 | 1 | 0 | 6 | 2 | – | | 31 | 8 |
| Urawa Red Diamonds | 2004 | 18 | 5 | 0 | 0 | 7 | 2 | – | | 25 | 7 |
| Yokohama F. Marinos | 2005 | 19 | 1 | 0 | 0 | 4 | 0 | – | | 23 | 1 |
| Yokohama F. Marinos | 2006 | 20 | 6 | 3 | 0 | 1 | 0 | – | | 24 | 6 |
| Yokohama F. Marinos | 2007 | 32 | 11 | 2 | 0 | 10 | 3 | – | | 44 | 14 |
| Yokohama F. Marinos | 2008 | 25 | 4 | 1 | 0 | 3 | 0 | – | | 29 | 4 |
| Yokohama F. Marinos | 2009 | 28 | 5 | 2 | 1 | 9 | 5 | – | | 39 | 11 |
| Yokohama F. Marinos | 2010 | 33 | 5 | 3 | 2 | 6 | 1 | – | | 42 | 8 |
| Kawasaki Frontale | 2011 | 34 | 6 | 3 | 0 | 4 | 2 | – | | 41 | 8 |
| Kawasaki Frontale | 2012 | 17 | 2 | 2 | 2 | 2 | 0 | – | | 21 | 4 |
| Kyoto Sanga FC | 2013 | 33 | 8 | 2 | 0 | – | | 2 | 0 | 37 | 8 |
| Kyoto Sanga FC | 2014 | 38 | 3 | 2 | 1 | – | | – | | 40 | 4 |
| Kyoto Sanga FC | 2015 | 23 | 1 | 0 | 0 | – | | – | | 23 | 1 |
| Kyoto Sanga FC | 2016 | 34 | 7 | 1 | 1 | – | | 1 | 0 | 36 | 8 |
| Avispa Fukuoka | 2017 | 40 | 6 | 0 | 0 | – | | 2 | 1 | 42 | 7 |
| Avispa Fukuoka | 2018 | 29 | 1 | 2 | 0 | – | | – | | 31 | 1 |
| Ehime FC | 2019 | | | | | – | | – | | | |
| Career total | | 499 | 86 | 28 | 7 | 55 | 15 | 5 | 1 | 587 | 109 |

== National team statistics ==
Japan national team
| Year | Apps | Goals |
|---|---|---|
| 2006 | 1 | 0 |
| 2007 | 1 | 1 |
| 2008 | 10 | 4 |
| 2009 | 0 | 0 |
| 2010 | 1 | 0 |
| Total | 13 | 5 |

International goals
| # | Date | Venue | Opponent | Score | Result | Competition |
|---|---|---|---|---|---|---|
| 1. | 22 August 2007 | Oita, Japan | Cameroon | 2–0 | Won | Friendly |
| 2. | 30 January 2008 | Tokyo, Japan | Bosnia and Herzegovina | 3–0 | Won | Friendly |
| 3. | 30 January 2008 | Tokyo, Japan | Bosnia and Herzegovina | 3–0 | Won | Friendly |
| 4. | 20 February 2008 | Chongqing, China PR | China | 1–0 | Won | East Asian Football Championship 2008 |
| 5. | 23 February 2008 | Chongqing, China PR | South Korea | 1–1 | Draw | East Asian Football Championship 2008 |

== Honors and awards ==
=== Individual honors ===
- J.League Rookie of the Year: 2001
- East Asian Football Championship Top Scorer: 2008

=== Team honors ===
- J1 League 2nd Stage Winner: 2004
- J.League Cup Winner: 2003
