= 2018 Tochigi SC season =

Tochigi SC
2018 season
- Manager: Yuji Yokoyama
- Stadium: Tochigi Green Stadium
- J2 League: 17th of 22
- Emperor's Cup: 2nd round
- Top goalscorer: Masashi Oguro (12)
- Highest home attendance: 11,562
- Lowest home attendance: 3,203
- Average home league attendance: 5,657
Home colours	Away colours

2018 Tochigi SC season.

== Squad ==
As of 1 July 2019. Note: Flags indicate national team as defined under FIFA eligibility rules; some limited exceptions apply. Players may hold more than one non-FIFA nationality.

No.	Pos.	Nation	Player
1	GK	(Japan) JPN	Kei Ishikawa
2	DF	(Japan) JPN	Ryuji Ito
3	DF	(Brazil) BRA	Jonas
4	DF	(Japan) JPN	Kotaro Fujiwara
5	DF	(Brazil) BRA	Henik
6	MF	(Japan) JPN	Tatsuki Kohatsu
7	DF	(Japan) JPN	Kazunori Kan
8	FW	(Japan) JPN	Koji Hirose (captain)
9	FW	(Japan) JPN	Masashi Oguro
10	MF	(Japan) JPN	Kazuki Nishiya
11	MF	(Japan) JPN	Tasuku Hiraoka
13	FW	(Brazil) BRA	Vinicius
14	MF	(Japan) JPN	Yuki Nishiya
15	DF	(Japan) JPN	Reiya Morishita (on loan from Cerezo Osaka)
16	FW	(Japan) JPN	Shota Sakaki
18	DF	(Japan) JPN	Ryota Sakata
19	FW	(Japan) JPN	Koki Oshima
20	MF	(Japan) JPN	Yudai Iwama

No.	Pos.	Nation	Player
21	MF	(Japan) JPN	Junya Osaki
22	DF	(Brazil) BRA	Mendes
23	GK	(Japan) JPN	Shuhei Kawata
24	MF	(Japan) JPN	Tatsuya Wada
26	MF	(Japan) JPN	Takuma Edamura
27	DF	(Japan) JPN	Ryosuke Hisadomi
28	DF	(Japan) JPN	Hayato Nukui
29	MF	(Japan) JPN	Kento Kawata (on loan from Omiya Ardija)
30	DF	(Japan) JPN	Masaya Tashiro
31	MF	(Japan) JPN	Kaito Miyake
32	MF	(Japan) JPN	Shuga Arai
33	DF	(Japan) JPN	Hayato Kurosaki
37	MF	(Japan) JPN	Akira Hamashita
40	MF	(Japan) JPN	Shinichi Terada
44	DF	(Japan) JPN	Kensuke Fukuda
41	FW	(Japan) JPN	Ryuta Honjo
47	FW	(South Korea) KOR	Kim Hyun (on loan from Jeju United)
50	GK	(South Korea) KOR	Yoo Hyun

=== Out on loan ===
Note: Flags indicate national team as defined under FIFA eligibility rules; some limited exceptions apply. Players may hold more than one non-FIFA nationality.

No.	Pos.	Nation	Player
17	MF	(Japan) JPN	Ren Yamamoto (at Arterivo Wakayama)
34	FW	(Japan) JPN	Tatsumi Sotome (at Blancdieu Hirosaki FC)

== J2 League ==
Data source: J.League

Match	Date	Team	Score	Team	Venue	Attendance
1	2018.02.25	Tochigi SC	2-4	Oita Trinita	Tochigi Green Stadium	8,526
2	2018.03.04	Fagiano Okayama	3-0	Tochigi SC	City Light Stadium	9,291
3	2018.03.11	Tochigi SC	2-5	Renofa Yamaguchi FC	Tochigi Green Stadium	4,681
4	2018.03.17	Tochigi SC	1-0	Kamatamare Sanuki	Tochigi Green Stadium	3,203
5	2018.03.21	FC Gifu	1-1	Tochigi SC	Gifu Nagaragawa Stadium	3,819
6	2018.03.25	Tochigi SC	1-0	Roasso Kumamoto	Tochigi Green Stadium	4,623
7	2018.04.01	Avispa Fukuoka	2-1	Tochigi SC	Level5 Stadium	7,775
8	2018.04.08	Tochigi SC	1-1	Tokushima Vortis	Tochigi Green Stadium	4,087
9	2018.04.15	Tochigi SC	2-1	Albirex Niigata	Tochigi Green Stadium	6,630
10	2018.04.22	Yokohama FC	0-0	Tochigi SC	NHK Spring Mitsuzawa Football Stadium	3,989
11	2018.04.28	Montedio Yamagata	0-1	Tochigi SC	ND Soft Stadium Yamagata	8,046
12	2018.05.03	Tochigi SC	3-1	Kyoto Sanga FC	Tochigi Green Stadium	4,643
13	2018.05.06	Ehime FC	1-1	Tochigi SC	Ningineer Stadium	2,196
14	2018.05.12	Ventforet Kofu	2-1	Tochigi SC	Yamanashi Chuo Bank Stadium	6,430
15	2018.05.20	Tochigi SC	0-0	FC Machida Zelvia	Tochigi Green Stadium	5,668
16	2018.05.27	Tochigi SC	0-1	Omiya Ardija	Tochigi Green Stadium	8,354
17	2018.06.03	Matsumoto Yamaga FC	1-0	Tochigi SC	Matsumotodaira Park Stadium	12,334
18	2018.06.10	Tochigi SC	1-2	Mito HollyHock	Tochigi Green Stadium	3,960
19	2018.06.16	Zweigen Kanazawa	2-0	Tochigi SC	Ishikawa Athletics Stadium	5,512
20	2018.06.23	Tokyo Verdy	3-0	Tochigi SC	Ajinomoto Stadium	4,446
21	2018.06.30	Tochigi SC	0-1	JEF United Chiba	Tochigi Green Stadium	5,894
22	2018.07.07	FC Machida Zelvia	0-1	Tochigi SC	Machida Stadium	3,627
23	2018.07.15	Tochigi SC	1-0	Montedio Yamagata	Tochigi Green Stadium	6,051
24	2018.07.21	Oita Trinita	0-0	Tochigi SC	Oita Bank Dome	7,080
25	2018.07.25	Mito HollyHock	0-0	Tochigi SC	K's denki Stadium Mito	5,002
26	2018.07.29	Tochigi SC	1-1	Zweigen Kanazawa	Tochigi Green Stadium	3,794
27	2018.08.04	Tochigi SC	4-1	FC Gifu	Tochigi Green Stadium	3,763
28	2018.08.11	Albirex Niigata	0-3	Tochigi SC	Denka Big Swan Stadium	15,103
29	2018.08.18	Tochigi SC	1-0	Avispa Fukuoka	Tochigi Green Stadium	5,048
30	2018.08.26	Roasso Kumamoto	0-1	Tochigi SC	Egao Kenko Stadium	5,012
31	2018.09.01	Tochigi SC	0-1	Fagiano Okayama	Tochigi Green Stadium	3,890
32	2018.09.08	Tokushima Vortis	4-1	Tochigi SC	Pocarisweat Stadium	3,917
33	2018.09.15	Tochigi SC	1-3	Ehime FC	Tochigi Green Stadium	9,459
34	2018.09.22	Kyoto Sanga FC	0-2	Tochigi SC	Kyoto Nishikyogoku Athletic Stadium	5,299
35	2018.09.30	Tochigi SC	0-1	Tokyo Verdy	Tochigi Green Stadium	3,950
36	2018.10.07	Tochigi SC	0-0	Yokohama FC	Tochigi Green Stadium	5,683
37	2018.10.13	Omiya Ardija	1-0	Tochigi SC	NACK5 Stadium Omiya	12,053
38	2018.10.21	Tochigi SC	2-2	Ventforet Kofu	Tochigi Green Stadium	5,336
39	2018.10.28	Renofa Yamaguchi FC	1-0	Tochigi SC	Ishin Me-Life Stadium	6,333
40	2018.11.04	Kamatamare Sanuki	1-2	Tochigi SC	Pikara Stadium	2,883
41	2018.11.11	Tochigi SC	0-1	Matsumoto Yamaga FC	Tochigi Green Stadium	11,562
42	2018.11.17	JEF United Chiba	0-0	Tochigi SC	Fukuda Denshi Arena	9,722
Emperors Cup
Match	Date	Team	Score	Team	Venue	Attendance
Round 2	2018.06.06	Tokushima Vortis	1-0	Tochigi SC	Pocarisweat Stadium	1,309
