= Tomoyuki Arata =

Japanese footballer (born 1985)

Personal information
- Full name: Tomoyuki Arata
- Date of birth: October 3, 1985 (age 41)
- Place of birth: Shizuoka, Shizuoka, Japan
- Height: 1.78 m (5 ft 10 in)
- Position: Striker

Youth career
- 1998–2000: Shimizu S-Pulse Junior Youth
- 2001–2003: Shimizu Higashi High School
- 2004–2007: Senshu University

Senior career*
Years	Team	Apps	(Gls)
2008–2009	Mito HollyHock	76	(31)
2010–2011	Júbilo Iwata	26	(1)
2012	JEF United Chiba	20	(6)
2013–2014	Fagiano Okayama	51	(15)
2015	Matsumoto Yamaga	0	(0)
2015	Oita Trinita	10	(1)
2016–2017	Nagano Parceiro	24	(1)
Medal record
Júbilo Iwata
Winner	J.League Cup	2010
- * Club domestic league appearances and goals as of 2 February 2018

Tomoyuki Arata (荒田 智之, Arata Tomoyuki; born October 3, 1985 in Shizuoka) is a former Japanese footballer who last played for Japanese club Nagano Parceiro. He was named J2's Rookie of the Year for 2008.

== Career statistics ==
Appearances and goals by club, season and competition
Club	Season	League			Emperor's Cup		J.League Cup		Total	
Club	Season	Division	Apps	Goals	Apps	Goals	Apps	Goals	Apps	Goals
Mito HollyHock	2008	J2 League	42	17	2	0	—		44	17
Mito HollyHock	2009	J2 League	34	14	1	2	—		35	16
Mito HollyHock	Total		76	31	3	2	0	0	79	33
Júbilo Iwata	2010	J1 League	13	0	3	1	6	1	22	2
Júbilo Iwata	2011	J1 League	13	1	2	3	2	1	17	5
Júbilo Iwata	Total		26	1	5	4	8	2	39	7
JEF United Chiba	2012	J2 League	20	6	2	0	—		22	6
Fagiano Okayama	2013	J2 League	31	9	1	0	—		32	9
Fagiano Okayama	2014	J2 League	13	3	0	0	—		13	3
Fagiano Okayama	Total		44	12	1	0	0	0	45	12
Matsumoto Yamaga	2015	J1 League	0	0	—		3	0	3	0
Oita Trinita	2015	J2 League	10	1	1	0	—		11	1
Nagano Parceiro	2016	J3 League	16	1	0	0	—		16	1
Nagano Parceiro	2017	J3 League	8	0	1	0	—		9	0
Nagano Parceiro	Total		24	1	1	0	0	0	25	1
Career total			200	53	13	6	11	2	215	60
