= 2017 Matsumoto Yamaga FC season =

Matsumoto Yamaga
2017 season
- Chairman: Hiroshi Otsuki
- Manager: Yasuharu Sorimachi
Home colours	Away colours

The 2017 Matsumoto Yamaga FC season was Matsumoto Yamaga' 2nd consecutive season in the J2 League after losing at the promotion playoffs at the end of the 2016 season.

== Squad ==
As of February 11, 2017.

Note: Flags indicate national team as defined under FIFA eligibility rules; some limited exceptions apply. Players may hold more than one non-FIFA nationality.

No.	Pos.	Nation	Player
1	GK	JPN	Eisuke Fujishima
2	DF	KOR	Yeo Sung-hye
3	DF	JPN	Hayuma Tanaka
4	DF	JPN	Masaki Iida
5	MF	JPN	Yudai Iwama
6	DF	JPN	Jun Ando
7	MF	JPN	Takuya Takei
8	MF	BRA	Serginho
9	FW	JPN	Hiroyuki Takasaki
10	MF	JPN	Kohei Kudo
11	FW	JPN	Kohei Mishima
13	DF	JPN	Keita Goto
14	MF	BRA	Paulinho
15	MF	JPN	Masaki Miyasaka
17	DF	BRA	Diego

No.	Pos.	Nation	Player
18	DF	JPN	Takefumi Toma
19	FW	JPN	Hiroki Yamamoto
20	MF	JPN	Takayoshi Ishihara
21	GK	JPN	Tomoyuki Suzuki
22	DF	JPN	Kenta Hoshihara
23	MF	JPN	Tomotaka Okamoto
24	DF	JPN	Masahiro Nasukawa
25	MF	JPN	Takaaki Shichi
26	FW	JPN	Yoshiki Oka
27	MF	JPN	Ryutaro Shibata
28	DF	JPN	Kenshiro Tanioku
30	GK	KOR	Goh Dong-min
31	DF	JPN	Yuya Hashiuchi
33	DF	JPN	Yu Yasukawa

== Transfers ==
=== Trial ===
Position	Player	From	Ref
MF	(Singapore) Gabriel Quak	(Singapore) Geylang International	
MF	(Singapore) Shawal Anuar	(Singapore) Geylang International	
