= Hayuma Tanaka =

Japanese footballer (born 1982)

Hayuma Tanaka 田中 隼磨
Personal information
- Full name: Hayuma Tanaka
- Date of birth: 31 July 1982 (age 44)
- Place of birth: Matsumoto, Nagano, Japan
- Height: 1.74 m (5 ft 8 1/2 in)
- Position: Defender

Team information
- Current team: Matsumoto Yamaga FC
- Number: 3

Youth career
- 1997–1999: Yokohama Flügels
- 1999–2000: Yokohama F. Marinos

Senior career*
Years	Team	Apps	(Gls)
2001–2008	Yokohama F. Marinos	168	(10)
2002–2003	→Tokyo Verdy (loan)	26	(2)
2009–2013	Nagoya Grampus	161	(3)
2014–2022	Matsumoto Yamaga FC	214	(4)

International career
2006	Japan	1	(0)
Medal record
Yokohama F. Marinos
Winner	J1 League	2004
Runner-up	J1 League	2000
Runner-up	J1 League	2002
Winner	J.League Cup	2001
Nagoya Grampus
Winner	J1 League	2010
Runner-up	J1 League	2011
Runner-up	Emperor's Cup	2009
Representing Japan
Asian Games
Silver medal – second place	2002 Busan	Team
AFC U-19 Championship
Silver medal – second place	2000 Iran
- * Club domestic league appearances and goals as of 22 December 2021

Hayuma Tanaka (田中 隼磨, Tanaka Hayuma; born 31 July 1982) is a Japanese football player who plays as a defender for Matsumoto Yamaga FC. He formerly played for the Japan national team.

== Club career ==
Tanaka was born in Matsumoto on 31 July 1982. He played for Yokohama Flügels youth team. However Flügels was merged with cross-town Yokohama Marinos (later Yokohama F. Marinos) and Flügels was dissolved end of 1998 season. So, he moved to Yokohama F. Marinos youth team.

Tanaka was promoted to Yokohama F. Marinos top team in 2000. He debuted in 2000 Emperor's Cup. He played many matches as defensive midfielder in 2001 season and Marinos won the champions in 2001 J.League Cup. However he could hardly play in the match in 2002.

In June 2002, Tanaka moved to Tokyo Verdy on loan. He was converted to right side back and became a regular player. However his opportunity to play decreased behind Masayuki Yanagisawa in 2003.

In 2004, Tanaka returned to Yokohama F. Marinos. He became a regular player as right side midfielder from summer and Marinos won the champions J1 League. From 2005, he played more than 30 games every season until 2008.

In 2009, Tanaka moved to Nagoya Grampus. He became a regular player as right side-back soon under manager Dragan Stojković. In 2010, Grampus won the champions in J1 League first time in the club history. In 2011, Grampus also won the 2nd place in J1 League.

In 2014, Tanaka moved to his local club Matsumoto Yamaga FC in J2 League. He was given number "3" shirt, which Tanaka's teammate at Marinos, Naoki Matsuda wore. Tanaka played as regular player and won the 2nd place and was promoted to J1 first time in the club history. In 2015 season, although he played all 34 matches, the club finished at the 16th place of 18 clubs and was relegated to J2 in a year. In 2018, the club won the champions in J2 and was promoted to J1 again.

== International career ==
On August 9, 2006, Tanaka debuted for Japan national team against Trinidad and Tobago.

== Career statistics ==
=== Club ===
As of end of 2018 season

Club performance			League		Cup		League Cup		Continental		Total	
Season	Club	League	Apps	Goals	Apps	Goals	Apps	Goals	Apps	Goals	Apps	Goals
Japan			League		Emperor's Cup		J.League Cup		AFC		Total	
2000	Yokohama F. Marinos	J1 League	0	0	3	0	0	0	-		3	0
2001	Yokohama F. Marinos	J1 League	16	0	0	0	5	0	-		21	0
2002	Yokohama F. Marinos	J1 League	0	0	0	0	2	0	-		2	0
Total			16	0	7	0	3	0	-		26	0
2002	Tokyo Verdy	J1 League	16	2	0	0	0	0	-		16	2
2003	Tokyo Verdy	J1 League	10	0	2	0	3	0	-		15	0
Total			26	2	3	0	2	0	-		31	2
2004	Yokohama F. Marinos	J1 League	23	1	2	0	5	0	2	0	32	1
2005	Yokohama F. Marinos	J1 League	31	1	1	0	4	0	6	0	42	1
2006	Yokohama F. Marinos	J1 League	34	5	1	0	9	2	-		44	7
2007	Yokohama F. Marinos	J1 League	32	2	2	0	9	0	-		43	2
2008	Yokohama F. Marinos	J1 League	32	1	4	1	8	1	-		44	3
Total			152	10	35	3	10	1	8	0	205	14
2009	Nagoya Grampus	J1 League	29	0	6	0	2	0	9	0	46	0
2010	Nagoya Grampus	J1 League	33	0	3	0	5	0	-		41	0
2011	Nagoya Grampus	J1 League	34	1	5	0	2	0	6	0	47	1
2012	Nagoya Grampus	J1 League	31	1	3	0	1	0	6	0	41	1
2013	Nagoya Grampus	J1 League	34	1	0	0	5	0	-		39	1
Total			161	3	15	0	17	1	21	0	214	4
2014	Matsumoto Yamaga FC	J2 League	39	0	1	0	-		-		40	0
2015	Matsumoto Yamaga FC	J1 League	34	0	4	0	2	0	–		40	0
2016	Matsumoto Yamaga FC	J2 League	28	1	0	0	–		–		28	1
2017	Matsumoto Yamaga FC	J2 League	40	1	1	0	–		–		41	1
2018	Matsumoto Yamaga FC	J2 League	23	2	2	0	–		–		25	2
2019	Matsumoto Yamaga FC	J1 League					–		–			
Total			164	4	8	0	2	0	-		174	0
Career total			519	19	40	1	62	3	29	0	650	23

== =International ==
Japan national team
Year	Apps	Goals
2006	1	0
Total	1	0

== Honors and awards ==
=== Club ===
Yokohama F. Marinos

- J1 League: 2004

Nagoya Grampus

- J1 League: 2010
- Japanese Super Cup: 2011
