= 2008 in Japanese football =

2008 season

Japanese football in 2008

== National team (Men) ==
=== Results ===
| 2008.01.26 | Japan | 0–0 | Chile | Tokyo, Japan |
| | | JFA | | Stadium: Tokyo National Stadium; Attendance: 32,261 |

| 2008.01.30 | Japan | 3–0 | Bosnia and Herzegovina | Tokyo, Japan |
| | Nakazawa 68'; Yamase 83', 88' | JFA | | Stadium: Tokyo National Stadium; Attendance: 26,971 |

| 2008.02.06 | Japan | 4–1 | Thailand | Saitama, Japan |
| | Endō 21'; Ōkubo 54'; Nakazawa 66'; Maki 90' | JFA | ? (?) | Stadium: Saitama Stadium 2002; Attendance: 35,130 |

| 2008.02.17 | Japan | 1–1 | North Korea | Chongqing, China PR |
| | Maeda 69' | JFA | ? (?) | Attendance: 15,000 |

| 2008.02.20 | Japan | 1–0 | China PR | Chongqing, China PR |
| | Yamase 17' | JFA | | Attendance: 38,000 |

| 2008.02.23 | Japan | 1–1 | South Korea | Chongqing, China PR |
| | Yamase 68' | JFA | ? (?) | Attendance: 29,000 |

| 2008.03.26 | Japan | 0–1 | Bahrain | Manama, Bahrain |
| | | JFA | ? (?) | Attendance: 26,000 |

| 2008.05.24 | Japan | 1–0 | Ivory Coast | Aichi, Japan |
| | Tamada 21' | JFA | | Stadium: Toyota Stadium; Attendance: 40,710 |

| 2008.05.27 | Japan | 0–0 | Paraguay | Saitama, Japan |
| | | JFA | | Stadium: Saitama Stadium 2002; Attendance: 27,998 |

| 2008.06.02 | Japan | 3–0 | Oman | Kanagawa, Japan |
| | Nakazawa 10'; Ōkubo 22'; S. Nakamura 49' | JFA | | Stadium: International Stadium Yokohama; Attendance: 46,764 |

| 2008.06.07 | Japan | 1–1 | Oman | Muscat, Oman |
| | Endō 53' | JFA | ? (?) | Attendance: 6,500 |

| 2008.06.14 | Japan | 3–0 | Thailand | Bangkok, Thailand |
| | Tulio 23'; Nakazawa 39'; K. Nakamura 88' | JFA | | Attendance: 25,000 |

| 2008.06.22 | Japan | 1–0 | Bahrain | Saitama, Japan |
| | Uchida 90' | JFA | | Stadium: Saitama Stadium 2002; Attendance: 51,180 |

| 2008.08.20 | Japan | 1–3 | Uruguay | Hokkaido, Japan |
| | 48' (o.g.) | JFA | ? (?) ? (?) ? (?) | Stadium: Sapporo Dome; Attendance: 31,133 |

| 2008.09.06 | Japan | 3–2 | Bahrain | Manama, Bahrain |
| | S. Nakamura 18'; Endō 44'; K. Nakamura 85' | JFA | ? (?) ? (?) | Attendance: 20,000 |

| 2008.10.09 | Japan | 1–1 | United Arab Emirates | Niigata, Japan |
| | Kagawa 72' | JFA | ? (?) | Stadium: Niigata Stadium; Attendance: 31,853 |

| 2008.10.15 | Japan | 1–1 | Uzbekistan | Saitama, Japan |
| | Tamada 40' | JFA | ? (?) | Stadium: Saitama Stadium 2002; Attendance: 55,142 |

| 2008.11.13 | Japan | 3–1 | Syria | Hyōgo, Japan |
| | Nagatomo 3'; Tamada 26'; Ōkubo 62' | JFA | ? (?) | Stadium: Kobe Wing Stadium; Attendance: 25,004 |

| 2008.11.19 | Japan | 3–0 | Qatar | Doha, Qatar |
| | Tanaka 19'; Tamada 47'; Tulio 68' | JFA | | Attendance: 13,000 |

=== Players statistics ===
| Player | -2007 | 01.26 | 01.30 | 02.06 | 02.17 | 02.20 | 02.23 | 03.26 | 05.24 | 05.27 | 06.02 | 06.07 | 06.14 | 06.22 | 08.20 | 09.06 | 10.09 | 10.15 | 11.13 | 11.19 | 2008 | Total |
| Yoshikatsu Kawaguchi | 110(0) | O | - | O | - | - | O | O | - | - | - | - | - | - | - | - | - | - | O | O | 6(0) | 116(0) |
| Shunsuke Nakamura | 73(20) | - | - | - | - | - | - | - | - | O | O(1) | O | O | O | - | O(1) | O | O | - | O | 9(2) | 82(22) |
| Junichi Inamoto | 68(4) | - | - | - | - | - | - | - | - | - | - | - | - | - | - | - | O | O | - | - | 2(0) | 70(4) |
| Yuji Nakazawa | 66(11) | O | O(1) | O(1) | O | O | O | O | O | - | O(1) | O | O(1) | O | O | O | O | O | - | - | 16(4) | 82(15) |
| Akira Kaji | 60(2) | O | - | - | O | O | O | - | - | - | - | - | - | - | - | - | - | - | - | - | 4(0) | 64(2) |
| Yasuhito Endō | 57(4) | O | O | O(1) | O | O | O | O | O | O | O | O(1) | O | O | - | O(1) | - | O | - | O | 16(3) | 73(7) |
| Shinji Ono | 55(6) | - | - | - | - | - | - | - | - | - | - | - | - | - | O | - | - | - | - | - | 1(0) | 56(6) |
| Naohiro Takahara | 53(23) | O | O | O | - | - | - | - | - | O | - | - | - | - | - | - | - | - | - | - | 4(0) | 57(23) |
| Seigo Narazaki | 51(0) | - | O | - | - | O | - | - | O | O | O | O | O | O | O | O | O | O | - | - | 12(0) | 63(0) |
| Keiji Tamada | 41(9) | - | - | - | - | - | - | O | O(1) | - | O | O | O | O | O | O | O | O(1) | O(1) | O(1) | 12(4) | 53(13) |
| Yūichi Komano | 27(0) | O | O | O | O | O | - | O | O | O | O | O | O | - | O | - | - | - | O | - | 13(0) | 40(0) |
| Seiichiro Maki | 26(7) | O | O | O(1) | - | - | - | O | - | O | O | - | - | O | - | - | O | - | O | - | 9(1) | 35(8) |
| Yuki Abe | 24(2) | O | O | O | - | - | - | O | - | O | - | - | - | - | O | O | - | O | O | - | 9(0) | 33(2) |
| Masashi Oguro | 21(5) | - | - | - | - | - | - | - | - | - | - | - | - | - | O | - | - | - | - | - | 1(0) | 22(5) |
| Yoshito Ōkubo | 21(2) | O | O | O(1) | - | - | - | O | O | O | O(1) | O | - | - | - | - | O | O | O(1) | O | 12(3) | 33(5) |
| Keita Suzuki | 20(0) | O | O | O | O | O | O | O | - | O | - | - | - | - | - | - | - | - | - | - | 8(0) | 28(0) |
| Hisato Satō | 19(3) | - | - | - | - | - | - | - | - | - | - | - | - | O | O | O | O | - | O | O | 6(0) | 25(3) |
| Kengo Nakamura | 16(1) | O | O | O | - | O | O | O | - | O | - | - | O(1) | O | O | O(1) | O | - | O | - | 13(2) | 29(3) |
| Yasuyuki Konno | 14(0) | - | O | - | - | O | O | O | O | O | O | O | O | O | - | O | - | - | O | - | 12(0) | 26(0) |
| Naotake Hanyu | 12(0) | O | O | O | O | O | - | - | - | - | - | - | - | - | - | - | - | - | - | - | 5(0) | 17(0) |
| Marcus Tulio Tanaka | 9(2) | - | - | - | - | - | - | - | O | O | O | O | O(1) | O | - | O | - | O | O | O(1) | 10(2) | 19(4) |
| Tatsuya Tanaka | 8(1) | - | - | - | - | - | - | - | - | - | - | - | - | - | O | O | - | - | O | O(1) | 4(1) | 12(2) |
| Satoru Yamagishi | 8(0) | O | - | - | O | - | - | O | - | - | - | - | - | - | - | - | - | - | - | - | 3(0) | 11(0) |
| Kisho Yano | 7(1) | O | - | - | - | - | O | - | O | - | - | O | O | - | - | - | - | - | - | - | 5(0) | 12(1) |
| Daisuke Matsui | 6(1) | - | - | - | - | - | - | - | O | O | O | O | O | - | - | O | - | - | - | O | 7(0) | 13(1) |
| Makoto Hasebe | 6(0) | - | - | - | - | - | - | - | O | O | O | O | O | - | O | O | O | O | - | O | 10(0) | 16(0) |
| Hideo Hashimoto | 4(0) | - | - | - | - | O | O | - | - | - | - | - | - | - | - | - | - | - | - | - | 2(0) | 6(0) |
| Ryūji Bando | 3(2) | - | O | O | O | - | O | - | - | - | - | - | - | - | - | - | - | - | - | - | 4(0) | 7(2) |
| Koji Yamase | 2(1) | O | O(2) | O | - | O(1) | O(1) | O | - | O | - | O | - | O | O | - | - | - | - | - | 10(4) | 12(5) |
| Ryoichi Maeda | 2(1) | - | - | - | O(1) | - | - | - | - | - | - | - | - | - | - | - | - | - | - | - | 1(1) | 3(2) |
| Hiroki Mizumoto | 2(0) | - | - | - | O | - | - | - | - | - | - | - | - | - | - | - | - | - | - | - | 1(0) | 3(0) |
| Atsuto Uchida | 0(0) | O | O | O | O | O | O | - | - | - | - | O | O | O(1) | - | O | O | O | O | O | 14(1) | 14(1) |
| Yuto Nagatomo | 0(0) | - | - | - | - | - | - | - | O | O | O | - | - | - | O | - | O | - | O(1) | O | 7(1) | 7(1) |
| Shinji Kagawa | 0(0) | - | - | - | - | - | - | - | O | - | O | - | O | - | - | - | O(1) | O | O | - | 6(1) | 6(1) |
| Michihiro Yasuda | 0(0) | - | - | - | O | O | O | O | - | - | - | - | - | O | - | - | - | - | - | - | 5(0) | 5(0) |
| Shuhei Terada | 0(0) | - | - | - | - | - | - | - | - | O | - | - | - | - | - | - | O | - | O | O | 4(0) | 4(0) |
| Shinji Okazaki | 0(0) | - | - | - | - | - | - | - | - | - | - | - | - | - | - | - | O | O | O | O | 4(0) | 4(0) |
| Yuzo Tashiro | 0(0) | - | - | - | O | O | O | - | - | - | - | - | - | - | - | - | - | - | - | - | 3(0) | 3(0) |
| Kazumichi Takagi | 0(0) | - | - | - | - | - | - | - | - | - | - | - | - | - | O | - | O | - | O | - | 3(0) | 3(0) |
| Shinzo Koroki | 0(0) | - | - | - | - | - | - | - | - | - | - | - | - | - | - | - | O | O | - | - | 2(0) | 2(0) |
| Eiji Kawashima | 0(0) | - | - | - | O | - | - | - | - | - | - | - | - | - | - | - | - | - | - | - | 1(0) | 1(0) |
| Keisuke Honda | 0(0) | - | - | - | - | - | - | - | - | - | - | - | - | O | - | - | - | - | - | - | 1(0) | 1(0) |
| Takeshi Aoki | 0(0) | - | - | - | - | - | - | - | - | - | - | - | - | - | O | - | - | - | - | - | 1(0) | 1(0) |

== National team (Women) ==
=== Results ===
| 2008.02.18 | Japan | 3–2 | North Korea | China |
| | Ando (?); Miyama (?); Sawa (?) | | ? (?) ? (?) |

| 2008.02.21 | Japan | 2–1 | South Korea | China |
| | Arakawa (?); Ono (?) | | ? (?) |

| 2008.02.24 | Japan | 3–0 | China | China |
| | Ono (?); Nagasato (?) |

| 2008.03.07 | Japan | 0–3 | Canada | Cyprus |
| | | | ? (?) ? (?) ? (?) |

| 2008.03.10 | Japan | 3–1 | Russia | Cyprus |
| | Sakaguchi (?); Ono (?); Utsugi (?) | | ? (?) |

| 2008.03.12 | Japan | 2–1 | Netherlands | Cyprus |
| | Nagasato (?); Utsugi (?) | | ? (?) |

| 2008.05.29 | Japan | 1–3 | South Korea | Vietnam |
| | Nagasato (?) | | ? (?) ? (?) ? (?) |

| 2008.05.31 | Japan | 11–0 | Chinese Taipei | Vietnam |
| | Sameshima (?); Utsugi (?); Ando (?); Arakawa (?); Maruyama (?); Goto (?); Kato (?); Nagasato (?) |

| 2008.06.02 | Japan | 3–1 | Australia | Vietnam |
| | Ando (?); Nagasato (?); Miyama (?) | | ? (?) |

| 2008.06.05 | Japan | 1–3 | China | Vietnam |
| | Sawa (?) | | ? (?) ? (?) ? (?) |

| 2008.06.08 | Japan | 3–0 | Australia | Vietnam |
| | Nagasato (?); Miyama (?); Sawa (?) |

| 2008.07.24 | Japan | 3–0 | Australia | Hyogo, Japan |
| | Sawa (?); Nagasato (?); Maruyama (?) | | | Stadium: Kobe Wing Stadium |

| 2008.07.29 | Japan | 2–0 | Argentina | Tokyo, Japan |
| | Ono (?); Nagasato (?) | | | Stadium: National Stadium |

| 2008.08.06 | Japan | 2–2 | New Zealand | China |
| | Miyama (?); Sawa (?) | | ? (?) ? (?) |

| 2008.08.09 | Japan | 0–1 | United States | China |
| | | | ? (?) |

| 2008.08.12 | Japan | 5–1 | Norway | China |
| | Kinga (?) (?); Ono (?); Sawa (?); Hara (?) | | ? (?) |

| 2008.08.15 | Japan | 2–0 | China | China |
| | Sawa (?); Nagasato (?) |

| 2008.08.18 | Japan | 2–4 | United States | China |
| | Ono (?); Arakawa (?) | | ? (?) ? (?) ? (?) ? (?) |

| 2008.08.21 | Japan | 0–2 | Germany | China |
| | | | ? (?) ? (?) |

=== Players statistics ===
| Player | -2007 | 02.18 | 02.21 | 02.24 | 03.07 | 03.10 | 03.12 | 05.29 | 05.31 | 06.02 | 06.05 | 06.08 | 07.24 | 07.29 | 08.06 | 08.09 | 08.12 | 08.15 | 08.18 | 08.21 | 2008 | Total |
| Homare Sawa | 130(65) | O(1) | O | O | - | - | - | O | - | O | O(1) | O(1) | O(1) | O | O(1) | O | O(1) | O(1) | O | O | 15(7) | 145(72) |
| Tomoe Kato | 110(7) | - | O | - | - | - | - | - | O(1) | - | - | - | - | O | - | - | O | - | - | - | 4(1) | 114(8) |
| Hiromi Ikeda | 107(4) | - | - | O | - | - | - | O | - | O | O | O | O | O | - | O | O | O | O | O | 12(0) | 119(4) |
| Nozomi Yamago | 83(0) | - | O | O | - | - | - | O | - | - | - | - | - | - | - | - | - | - | - | - | 3(0) | 86(0) |
| Miyuki Yanagita | 76(11) | O | O | O | O | O | O | O | - | O | O | O | O | O | O | O | - | O | - | - | 15(0) | 91(11) |
| Eriko Arakawa | 54(17) | O | O(1) | O | - | - | - | O | O(1) | O | O | O | - | O | O | O | - | O | O(1) | O | 14(3) | 68(20) |
| Kozue Ando | 52(7) | O(1) | O | O | O | - | O | O | O(1) | O(1) | - | O | O | O | O | O | O | O | O | - | 16(3) | 68(10) |
| Aya Miyama | 50(15) | O(1) | O | O | O | O | O | O | - | O(1) | O | O(1) | O | O | O(1) | O | O | O | O | O | 18(4) | 68(19) |
| Shinobu Ono | 46(18) | O | O(1) | O(2) | O | O(1) | O | O | O | O | O | O | O | O(1) | O | O | O(1) | O | O(1) | O | 19(7) | 65(25) |
| Karina Maruyama | 41(10) | O | O | O | - | O | O | O | O(2) | - | O | O | O(1) | O | O | O | O | O | O | O | 17(3) | 58(13) |
| Kyoko Yano | 41(1) | - | O | - | - | O | O | - | - | - | - | - | O | O | O | - | O | O | O | O | 10(0) | 51(1) |
| Yuki Nagasato | 35(19) | O | - | O(1) | - | O | O(1) | O(1) | O(1) | O(1) | O | O(1) | O(1) | O(1) | O | O | O | O(1) | O | O | 17(9) | 52(28) |
| Ayumi Hara | 34(1) | - | - | - | O | O | - | - | - | - | - | - | O | O | - | O | O(1) | - | O | O | 8(1) | 42(2) |
| Miho Fukumoto | 33(0) | O | - | - | O | O | O | - | - | O | O | - | O | O | O | O | O | O | O | O | 14(0) | 47(0) |
| Mai Nakachi | 29(0) | - | O | - | - | - | - | - | - | - | - | - | - | - | - | - | - | - | - | - | 1(0) | 30(0) |
| Aya Shimokozuru | 27(0) | - | - | - | - | - | - | - | O | - | - | - | - | - | - | - | - | - | - | - | 1(0) | 28(0) |
| Azusa Iwashimizu | 23(5) | O | O | O | O | O | O | O | - | O | O | O | O | O | O | O | O | O | O | O | 18(0) | 41(5) |
| Yukari Kinga | 19(0) | O | O | O | O | O | O | O | - | O | O | O | O | O | O | O | O(1) | O | O | O | 18(1) | 37(1) |
| Rumi Utsugi | 16(0) | - | - | O | O | O(1) | O(1) | - | O(2) | O | O | - | O | O | - | - | - | - | - | O | 10(4) | 26(4) |
| Mizuho Sakaguchi | 12(13) | O | - | O | O | O(1) | O | O | - | O | O | O | O | O | O | O | O | O | O | O | 17(1) | 29(14) |
| Nayuha Toyoda | 13(0) | O | O | - | O | - | O | - | - | - | - | - | - | - | - | - | - | - | - | - | 4(0) | 17(0) |
| Ayako Kitamoto | 7(3) | - | - | - | - | - | - | - | O | - | O | - | - | - | - | - | - | - | - | - | 2(0) | 9(3) |
| Eriko Sato | 1(0) | - | - | - | - | O | - | - | - | - | - | - | - | - | - | - | - | - | - | - | 1(0) | 2(0) |
| Ayumi Kaihori | 0(0) | - | - | - | - | - | - | - | O | - | - | O | O | - | - | - | - | - | - | - | 3(0) | 3(0) |
| Michi Goto | 0(0) | - | - | - | O | - | - | - | O(2) | - | - | - | - | - | - | - | - | - | - | - | 2(2) | 2(2) |
| Aya Sameshima | 0(0) | - | - | - | - | O | - | - | O(1) | - | - | - | - | - | - | - | - | - | - | - | 2(1) | 2(1) |
| Saki Kumagai | 0(0) | - | - | - | O | - | - | - | O | - | - | - | - | - | - | - | - | - | - | - | 2(0) | 2(0) |
| Nahomi Kawasumi | 0(0) | - | - | - | - | - | - | - | O | - | - | - | - | - | - | - | - | - | - | - | 1(0) | 1(0) |

== Deaths ==
- 2 June: Ken Naganuma (born 1930)
