= Masashi Oguro =

Japanese footballer (born 1980)

Masashi Oguro 大黒 将志
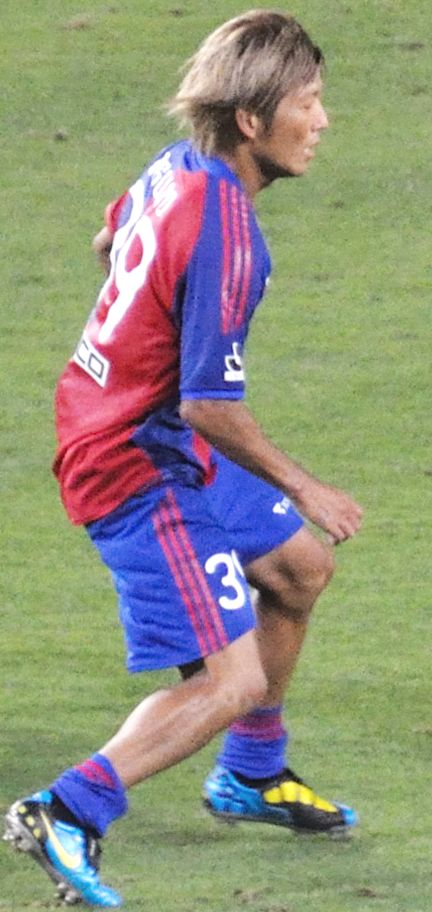
- Oguro in 2010

Personal information
- Full name: Masashi Oguro
- Date of birth: 4 May 1980 (age 46)
- Place of birth: Toyonaka, Osaka, Japan
- Height: 1.78 m (5 ft 10 in)
- Position: Forward

Team information
- Current team: Nara Club (manager)

Youth career
- 1993–1998: Gamba Osaka

Senior career*
Years	Team	Apps	(Gls)
1999–2005	Gamba Osaka	111	(48)
2001	→ Consadole Sapporo (loan)	4	(0)
2006	Grenoble	19	(6)
2006–2008	Torino	10	(0)
2008–2009	Tokyo Verdy	53	(23)
2010	Yokohama FC	16	(12)
2010	FC Tokyo	22	(7)
2011–2013	Yokohama F. Marinos	53	(12)
2013	Hangzhou Greentown	24	(3)
2014–2017	Kyoto Sanga	110	(49)
2016	→ Montedio Yamagata (loan)	26	(9)
2018	→ Tochigi SC (loan)	40	(12)
2019–2020	Tochigi SC	29	(6)
Total		517	(181)

International career
2005–2008	Japan	22	(5)

Managerial career
- 2026–: Nara Club
Medal record
Gamba Osaka
Winner	J1 League	2005
Runner-up	J.League Cup	2005
Yokohama F. Marinos
Runner-up	J1 League	2013
Winner	Emperor's Cup	2013
- * Club domestic league appearances and goals

Masashi Oguro (大黒 将志, Ōguro Masashi; born 4 May 1980) is a Japanese former professional footballer who played as a forward. He made 22 appearances scoring 5 goals for Japan national team between 2005 and 2008.

== Club career ==
Oguro joined the J1 League in 1999, with Gamba Osaka. He was loaned to Consadole Sapporo for the 2001 season, and returned to Gamba having impressed many in Osaka. In 2004, Oguro scored the second-highest number of goals in the J1 League, and the highest number of all Japanese-born players. In Chinese characters, Oguro's name resembles that of the god Daikokuten, giving him that nickname. Gamba Osaka's official merchandise store has come to be called the Shrine of Daikokuten. In 2005, Oguro was the sixth top J1 League scorer, and helped lead Gamba Osaka to the J1 League championship.

In December 2005, Oguro was signed by French club Grenoble, where he appeared in 17 Ligue 2 matches.

In August 2006, Oguro was transferred to Italian club Torino.

In June 2008, Oguro returned to Japan and moved to J1 League side Tokyo Verdy. However he could scored only two goals and Verdy was relegated to J2 League. In 2009, he played in J2 League first time and scored 21 goals. However the club finished at 7th place and could not return to J1. In 2010, Oguro moved to J2 club Yokohama FC and scored 12 goals in 16 matches until June. In June 2010, Oguro moved to J1 club FC Tokyo. In 2011, Oguro transferred to J1 club Yokohama F. Marinos. He scored ten goals in 2011 season. However he could scored only two goals in 2012 season.

In 2013, initially Oguro was registered in Yokohama F. Marinos (His registration was deleted in March). However on 4 February, Oguro moved to Chinese Super League side Hangzhou Greentown for the 2013 season, and rejoined manager Takeshi Okada, whom he played under at Consadole Sapporo and Japan national team.

In January 2014, Oguro returned to Japan and signed with J2 club Kyoto Sanga FC. he scored 42 goals in two seasons. In 2016, he moved to Montedio Yamagata on loan. In 2017, he returned to Sanga. In 2018, he moved to Tochigi SC.

== International career ==
Oguro was chosen for the Japan national team in 2005 for the 2006 World Cup qualifying games. During his second game for the team on 9 February, Oguro scored the second goal in injury time to help Japan to a 2–0 win over North Korea in the final game of Asian qualification. In 2005, Oguro was the fifth top scorer for the Japan national team. In May 2006, Oguro was called up to play for Japan in the 2006 World Cup in Germany. He played 22 games and scored 5 goals for Japan until 2008.

== Career statistics ==
=== Club ===
As of end of 2018 season

Appearances and goals by club, season and competition
Club	Season	League		National cup		League cup		Total	
Club	Season	Apps	Goals	Apps	Goals	Apps	Goals	Apps	Goals
Gamba Osaka	1999	11	0	0	0	2	0	13	0
Gamba Osaka	2000	7	1	1	0	2	0	10	1
Gamba Osaka	2002	6	1	0	0	2	1	8	2
Gamba Osaka	2003	26	10	2	0	5	3	33	13
Gamba Osaka	2004	30	20	2	6	7	4	39	30
Gamba Osaka	2005	31	16	2	2	4	0	37	18
Gamba Osaka	Total	111	48	7	8	22	8	140	64
Consadole Sapporo (loan)	2001	4	0	0	0	2	0	6	0
Grenoble	2005–06	17	5	0	0	0	0	17	5
Grenoble	2006–07	2	1	0	0	1	0	3	1
Grenoble	Total	19	6	0	0	1	0	20	6
Torino	2006–07	7	0	0	0	–		7	0
Torino	2007–08	3	0	1	0	–		4	0
Torino	Total	10	0	1	0	0	0	11	0
Tokyo Verdy	2008	14	2	0	0	0	0	14	2
Tokyo Verdy	2009	39	21	0	0	–		39	21
Tokyo Verdy	Total	53	23	0	0	0	0	53	23
Yokohama FC	2010	16	12	0	0	–		16	12
FC Tokyo	2010	22	7	2	0	2	0	26	7
Yokohama F. Marinos	2011	28	10	3	4	5	3	36	17
Yokohama F. Marinos	2012	25	2	1	0	3	1	29	3
Yokohama F. Marinos	2013	0	0	0	0	0	0	0	0
Yokohama F. Marinos	Total	53	12	4	4	8	4	65	20
Hangzhou Greentown	2013	24	3	2	3	–		26	6
Kyoto Sanga FC	2014	42	26	2	1	–		44	27
Kyoto Sanga FC	2015	40	16	3	0	–		43	16
Kyoto Sanga FC	2017	28	6	1	0	–		29	6
Kyoto Sanga FC	Total	110	48	6	1	0	0	116	49
Montedio Yamagata (loan)	2016	26	9	1	1	–		27	10
Tochigi SC	2018	40	12	0	0	–		40	12
Tochigi SC	2019					–			
Tochigi SC	Total								
Career total		488	180	22	17	35	12	545	209

=== International ===
Appearances and goals by national team and year
National team	Year	Apps	Goals
Japan	2005	15	5
Japan	2006	6	0
Japan	2007	0	0
Japan	2008	1	0
Total		22	5

Scores and results list Japan's goal tally first, score column indicates score after each Oguro goal.

List of international goals scored by Masashi Oguro
No.	Date	Venue	Opponent	Score	Result	Competition
1	9 February 2005	Saitama Stadium, Saitama, Japan	North Korea	2–1	2–1	2006 FIFA World Cup Qualification
2	8 June 2005	Suphachalasai Stadium, Bangkok, Thailand	North Korea	2–0	2–0	2006 FIFA World Cup Qualification
3	19 June 2005	Waldstadion, Frankfurt, Germany	Greece	1–0	1–0	2005 FIFA Confederations Cup
4	22 June 2005	RheinEnergieStadion, Cologne, Germany	Brazil	2–2	2–2	2005 FIFA Confederations Cup
5	17 August 2005	International Stadium Yokohama, Yokohama, Japan	Iran	2–0	2–1	2006 FIFA World Cup Qualification

== Honors ==
Gamba Osaka

- J1 League: 2005

FC Tokyo

- Suruga Bank Championship: 2010

Individual

- J.League Best Eleven: 2004
