= Serginho (footballer, born 1990) =

Brazilian footballer

Personal information
- Full name: Sérgio Ricardo dos Santos Júnior
- Date of birth: 3 December 1990 (age 35)
- Place of birth: Santos, Brazil
- Height: 1.66 m (5 ft 5 in)
- Positions: Attacking midfielder; forward

Team information
- Current team: Maringá (on loan from Brasiliense)
- Number: 37

Youth career
- 2001–2009: Santos

Senior career*
Years	Team	Apps	(Gls)
2010–2011	Santos	1	(0)
2010	→ Red Bull Brasil (loan)	8	(1)
2011	→ Oeste (loan)	5	(1)
2011–2015	Oeste	88	(29)
2013–2014	→ Palmeiras (loan)	26	(5)
2015	Kairat	14	(3)
2016	Ceará	25	(3)
2017–2020	Matsumoto Yamaga	108	(25)
2021	Daegu FC	13	(0)
2021	Matsumoto Yamaga	14	(1)
2022	Paysandu	24	(4)
2023–2024	Maringá	41	(8)
2023	→ Portuguesa (loan)	0	(0)
2024	→ Santos (loan)	19	(2)
2025–2026	Ponte Preta	26	(1)
2026	→ North (loan)	8	(0)
2026–	Brasiliense	9	(0)
2026–	→ Maringá (loan)	10	(0)
- * Club domestic league appearances and goals as of 19:34, 5 November 2024 (UTC)

Sérgio Ricardo dos Santos Júnior, commonly known as Serginho (born 3 December 1990 in Santos, São Paulo), is a Brazilian footballer who plays as either an attacking midfielder or a forward for Maringá, on loan from Brasiliense.

== Career ==
=== Santos ===
Born in Santos, São Paulo, Serginho joined the youth categories of hometown side Santos FC in 2001, aged ten. During his period in the youth sides, he was a defensive midfielder or a right-back, and also played with Neymar.

After being an unused substitute in a 4–0 Campeonato Paulista away win over Rio Branco-SP, Serginho made his senior debut on 20 January 2010, replacing injured George Lucas but being himself replaced by Madson in a 1–1 home draw against Ponte Preta for the same competition. It was his maiden appearance at the club.

==== Red Bull Brasil (loan) ====
In April 2010, Serginho moved on loan to Red Bull Brasil in the Campeonato Paulista Série A3. He scored on his debut, netting the opener in a 2–1 home win over Penapolense, and helped the side to win the state championship before returning to Peixe, where he was assigned to the under-23 team.

=== Oeste ===
After starting the 2011 season on loan at Oeste, Serginho subsequently rescinded his contract with Santos in the middle of the year and joined Oeste on a permanent deal afterwards. After moving to a forward position, he was the top scorer of the club in the 2012 Série C, netting six goals as the Rubrão achieved promotion as champions.

Serginho continued with his goalscoring form in the 2013 Campeonato Paulista, being again Oeste's top scorer as they avoided relegation.

==== Loan to Palmeiras ====
On 24 April 2013, Serginho moved to fellow Série B side Palmeiras on a one-year loan deal, with a buyout clause. He made his club debut on 4 June, replacing Vinícius in a 2–1 home win over Avaí, and scored his first goal on 12 July, netting the fourth in a 4–1 home routing of ABC.

A backup option, Serginho scored five goals in 20 league appearances for Verdão in the 2013 Série B, as they returned to the top tier at first attempt. He made his Série A debut on 26 April 2014, replacing Josimar in a 1–0 home loss to Fluminense.

In May 2014, however, Serginho returned to Oeste after an agreement for a loan extension was not reached.

=== Kairat ===
On 18 March 2015, Serginho signed a three-year contract with Kazakhstan Premier League side FC Kairat. He made his debut abroad on 5 April, in a 4–0 home routing of FC Okzhetpes, and scored his first goal on 5 July, in a 5–0 away thrashing of FC Shakhter Karagandy.

=== Ceará ===
In January 2016, Serginho returned to Brazil, signing a one-year contract with Ceará in the second division. He failed to establish himself as a first-choice, only starting in five matches during the 2016 Série B.

=== Matsumoto Yamaga ===
On 11 January 2017, J2 League side Matsumoto Yamaga announced the signing of Serginho. Regularly used, he scored a career-best 11 goals in the 2018 season, as the club achieved promotion to the J1 League.

On 7 February 2021, Yamaga announced that Serginho had left the club at the end of the 2020 season, as his contract expired.

=== Daegu FC ===
On 26 February 2021, Matsumoto Yamaga announced that Serginho had joined K League 1 side Daegu FC. He featured in 13 league matches before departing the club on 18 June, due to "family reasons".

=== Matsumoto Yamaga return ===
On 29 July 2021, Serginho returned to Matsumoto Yamaga. In his second spell at the club, he only managed to score once before leaving again on 21 December.

=== Paysandu ===
On 25 February 2022, Serginho returned to his home country after more than five years abroad, and signed for Paysandu in the Série C. Despite featuring regularly, he agreed to leave the club on 3 October.

=== Maringá ===
On 30 December 2022, Serginho agreed to a short-term deal with Maringá. On 2 June 2023, he renewed his contract with the club until 2025.

==== Portuguesa (loan) ====
On 15 August 2023, Serginho was announced at Portuguesa on loan until the end of the year's Copa Paulista. He featured in five matches, and left after the club's elimination from the competition.

==== Santos return (loan) ====
On 23 April 2024, Serginho was announced back at Santos, on loan for the 2024 Série B. He made his first appearance for the club after more than 14 years on 19 May, replacing Weslley Patati in a 4–0 home routing of Brusque.

Serginho scored his first goal for Peixe on 28 July 2024, netting the opener in a 1–1 away draw against CRB.

=== Ponte Preta ===
After his loan with Santos ended, Serginho rescinded his contract with Maringá on 2 January 2025, signing with Ponte Preta shortly after.

== Career statistics ==
As of 5 November 2024

Club	Season	League			State league		National cup		Continental		Other		Total	
Club	Season	Division	Apps	Goals	Apps	Goals	Apps	Goals	Apps	Goals	Apps	Goals	Apps	Goals
Santos	2010	Série A	0	0	1	0	0	0	0	0	—		1	0
Red Bull Brasil (loan)	2010	Paulista A3	—		8	1	—		—		—		8	1
Oeste	2011	Série D	10	4	5	1	—		—		—		15	5
Oeste	2012	Série C	18	6	14	4	—		—		—		32	10
Oeste	2013	Série B	0	0	17	7	—		—		—		17	7
Oeste	2014	Série B	21	6	—		—		—		—		21	6
Oeste	2015	Série B	0	0	8	2	—		—		—		8	2
Oeste	Total		49	16	44	14	—		—		—		93	30
Palmeiras (loan)	2013	Série B	20	5	—		1	0	0	0	—		21	5
Palmeiras (loan)	2014	Série A	2	0	4	0	2	0	—		—		8	0
Palmeiras (loan)	Total		22	5	4	0	3	0	0	0	—		29	5
Kairat	2015	Kazakhstan Premier League	14	3	—		3	0	5 (Note: Appearance(s) in UEFA Europa League)	0	—		22	3
Ceará	2016	Série B	17	1	8	2	6	0	—		7 (Note: Appearance(s) in Copa do Nordeste)	0	38	3
Matsumoto Yamaga	2017	J2 League	27	3	—		2	2	—		—		29	5
Matsumoto Yamaga	2018	J2 League	33	11	—		1	0	—		—		34	11
Matsumoto Yamaga	2019	J1 League	15	2	—		0	0	—		2 (Note: Appearance(s) in J.League Cup)	0	17	2
Matsumoto Yamaga	2020	J2 League	33	9	—		0	0	—		0	0	33	9
Matsumoto Yamaga	Total		108	25	—		3	2	—		2	0	113	27
Daegu FC	2021	K League 1	13	0	—		1	1	0	0	—		14	1
Matsumoto Yamaga	2021	J2 League	14	1	—		0	0	—		—		14	1
Paysandu	2022	Série C	18	3	6	1	1	0	—		—		25	4
Maringá	2023	Série D	14	2	12	3	4	3	—		—		30	8
Maringá	2024	Série D	0	0	15	3	1	0	—		—		16	3
Maringá	Total		14	2	27	6	5	3	—		—		46	11
Portuguesa (loan)	2023	Paulista	—		0	0	—		—		5 (Note: Appearance(s) in Copa Paulista)	0	5	0
Santos (loan)	2024	Série B	19	2	—		—		—		—		19	2
Ponte Preta	2025	Série C	0	0	0	0	—		—		—		0	0
Career total			289	58	98	24	22	7	5	0	14	0	428	88

== Honours ==
Santos

- Campeonato Paulista: 2010
- Campeonato Brasileiro Série B: 2024

Red Bull Brasil

- Campeonato Paulista Série A3: 2010

Oeste

- Campeonato Brasileiro Série C: 2012

Palmeiras

- Campeonato Brasileiro Série B: 2013

Kairat

- Kazakhstan Cup: 2015

Matsumoto Yamaga

- J2 League: 2018

Ponte Preta

- Campeonato Brasileiro Série C: 2025

Maringá

- Campeonato Brasileiro Série C: 2026
