= 2018 JEF United Chiba season =

JEF United Chiba
2018 season
- Manager: Juan Esnáider
- Stadium: Fukuda Denshi Arena
- J2 League: 14th

2018 JEF United Chiba season.

== J2 League ==
Match	Date	Team	Score	Team	Venue	Attendance
1	2018.02.25	Tokyo Verdy	2-1	JEF United Chiba	Ajinomoto Stadium	9,400
2	2018.03.04	JEF United Chiba	0-0	Mito HollyHock	Fukuda Denshi Arena	11,285
3	2018.03.11	JEF United Chiba	2-3	FC Gifu	Fukuda Denshi Arena	8,845
4	2018.03.17	Tokushima Vortis	4-1	JEF United Chiba	Pocarisweat Stadium	5,074
5	2018.03.21	JEF United Chiba	6-1	Kamatamare Sanuki	Fukuda Denshi Arena	6,152
6	2018.03.25	JEF United Chiba	2-0	Kyoto Sanga FC	Fukuda Denshi Arena	9,737
7	2018.04.01	Oita Trinita	4-0	JEF United Chiba	Oita Bank Dome	6,797
8	2018.04.08	Zweigen Kanazawa	3-1	JEF United Chiba	Ishikawa Athletics Stadium	3,028
9	2018.04.15	JEF United Chiba	3-2	FC Machida Zelvia	Fukuda Denshi Arena	7,779
10	2018.04.22	Avispa Fukuoka	3-1	JEF United Chiba	Level5 Stadium	7,984
11	2018.04.28	Ventforet Kofu	1-1	JEF United Chiba	Yamanashi Chuo Bank Stadium	8,814
12	2018.05.03	JEF United Chiba	1-0	Fagiano Okayama	Fukuda Denshi Arena	10,514
13	2018.05.06	Omiya Ardija	0-1	JEF United Chiba	NACK5 Stadium Omiya	12,400
14	2018.05.12	JEF United Chiba	1-2	Albirex Niigata	Fukuda Denshi Arena	12,078
15	2018.05.20	Yokohama FC	3-3	JEF United Chiba	NHK Spring Mitsuzawa Football Stadium	6,772
16	2018.05.27	JEF United Chiba	3-1	Roasso Kumamoto	Fukuda Denshi Arena	12,440
17	2018.06.02	JEF United Chiba	2-2	Renofa Yamaguchi FC	Fukuda Denshi Arena	9,787
18	2018.06.10	Montedio Yamagata	2-1	JEF United Chiba	ND Soft Stadium Yamagata	6,606
19	2018.06.16	JEF United Chiba	2-1	Ehime FC	Fukuda Denshi Arena	9,020
20	2018.06.23	Matsumoto Yamaga FC	4-2	JEF United Chiba	Matsumotodaira Park Stadium	11,475
21	2018.06.30	Tochigi SC	0-1	JEF United Chiba	Tochigi Green Stadium	5,894
22	2018.07.07	JEF United Chiba	1-3	Omiya Ardija	Fukuda Denshi Arena	11,069
23	2018.07.15	JEF United Chiba	3-4	Zweigen Kanazawa	Fukuda Denshi Arena	10,003
24	2018.07.21	Kamatamare Sanuki	2-1	JEF United Chiba	Pikara Stadium	2,340
25	2018.07.25	JEF United Chiba	2-1	Ventforet Kofu	Fukuda Denshi Arena	8,983
26	2018.07.29	Albirex Niigata	1-2	JEF United Chiba	Denka Big Swan Stadium	13,375
27	2018.08.04	JEF United Chiba	2-3	Matsumoto Yamaga FC	Fukuda Denshi Arena	12,336
28	2018.08.12	FC Machida Zelvia	3-3	JEF United Chiba	Machida Stadium	5,075
29	2018.08.18	Mito HollyHock	1-0	JEF United Chiba	K's denki Stadium Mito	6,122
30	2018.08.25	JEF United Chiba	2-3	Tokyo Verdy	Fukuda Denshi Arena	11,287
31	2018.09.01	Renofa Yamaguchi FC	0-4	JEF United Chiba	Ishin Me-Life Stadium	4,499
32	2018.09.09	Fagiano Okayama	0-2	JEF United Chiba	City Light Stadium	5,470
33	2018.09.16	JEF United Chiba	3-3	Avispa Fukuoka	Fukuda Denshi Arena	10,588
34	2018.09.23	JEF United Chiba	0-1	Yokohama FC	Fukuda Denshi Arena	10,233
35	2018.09.29	Ehime FC	1-0	JEF United Chiba	Ningineer Stadium	2,515
36	2018.10.07	Roasso Kumamoto	1-3	JEF United Chiba	Egao Kenko Stadium	3,936
37	2018.10.14	JEF United Chiba	2-1	Montedio Yamagata	Fukuda Denshi Arena	8,992
38	2018.10.21	JEF United Chiba	2-4	Oita Trinita	Fukuda Denshi Arena	8,973
39	2018.10.28	FC Gifu	2-0	JEF United Chiba	Gifu Nagaragawa Stadium	6,406
40	2018.11.04	JEF United Chiba	2-0	Tokushima Vortis	Fukuda Denshi Arena	7,202
41	2018.11.10	Kyoto Sanga FC	0-3	JEF United Chiba	Kyoto Nishikyogoku Athletic Stadium	7,498
42	2018.11.17	JEF United Chiba	0-0	Tochigi SC	Fukuda Denshi Arena	9,722
