= 2018 Avispa Fukuoka season =

Avispa Fukuoka
2018 season
- Manager: Masami Ihara
- Stadium: Level5 Stadium
- J2 League: 7th
Home colours	Away colours

2018 Avispa Fukuoka season.

== J2 League ==
Match	Date	Team	Score	Team	Venue	Attendance
1	2018.02.25	Avispa Fukuoka	2-0	FC Gifu	Level5 Stadium	12,856
2	2018.03.03	Avispa Fukuoka	2-2	Kyoto Sanga FC	Level5 Stadium	6,816
3	2018.03.11	Zweigen Kanazawa	0-1	Avispa Fukuoka	Ishikawa Athletics Stadium	3,032
4	2018.03.17	Avispa Fukuoka	0-2	Ventforet Kofu	Level5 Stadium	7,189
5	2018.03.21	Tokyo Verdy	1-1	Avispa Fukuoka	Ajinomoto Stadium	3,048
6	2018.03.25	Omiya Ardija	2-1	Avispa Fukuoka	NACK5 Stadium Omiya	9,106
7	2018.04.01	Avispa Fukuoka	2-1	Tochigi SC	Level5 Stadium	7,775
8	2018.04.08	Yokohama FC	2-2	Avispa Fukuoka	NHK Spring Mitsuzawa Football Stadium	4,088
9	2018.04.14	Avispa Fukuoka	2-0	Renofa Yamaguchi FC	Level5 Stadium	6,837
10	2018.04.22	Avispa Fukuoka	3-1	JEF United Chiba	Level5 Stadium	7,984
11	2018.04.28	Kamatamare Sanuki	1-1	Avispa Fukuoka	Pikara Stadium	2,745
12	2018.05.03	Avispa Fukuoka	2-1	Montedio Yamagata	Level5 Stadium	9,620
13	2018.05.06	Fagiano Okayama	2-2	Avispa Fukuoka	City Light Stadium	9,021
14	2018.05.12	Avispa Fukuoka	2-0	Ehime FC	Level5 Stadium	6,684
15	2018.05.20	Matsumoto Yamaga FC	1-0	Avispa Fukuoka	Matsumotodaira Park Stadium	12,659
16	2018.05.27	Mito HollyHock	0-2	Avispa Fukuoka	K's denki Stadium Mito	4,592
17	2018.06.02	Avispa Fukuoka	1-0	Tokushima Vortis	Level5 Stadium	8,598
18	2018.06.10	Roasso Kumamoto	0-1	Avispa Fukuoka	Kumamoto Suizenji Stadium	5,118
19	2018.06.16	Avispa Fukuoka	0-2	Albirex Niigata	Level5 Stadium	9,467
20	2018.06.23	Oita Trinita	1-0	Avispa Fukuoka	Oita Bank Dome	12,056
21	2018.06.30	Avispa Fukuoka	2-2	FC Machida Zelvia	Level5 Stadium	8,492
23	2018.07.15	Avispa Fukuoka	3-1	Kamatamare Sanuki	Level5 Stadium	8,011
24	2018.07.21	Avispa Fukuoka	0-0	Tokyo Verdy	Level5 Stadium	7,294
25	2018.07.25	Tokushima Vortis	3-1	Avispa Fukuoka	Pocarisweat Stadium	3,787
27	2018.08.04	Ventforet Kofu	1-2	Avispa Fukuoka	Yamanashi Chuo Bank Stadium	7,064
28	2018.08.11	Avispa Fukuoka	2-0	Mito HollyHock	Level5 Stadium	9,012
29	2018.08.18	Tochigi SC	1-0	Avispa Fukuoka	Tochigi Green Stadium	5,048
30	2018.08.26	Albirex Niigata	0-3	Avispa Fukuoka	Denka Big Swan Stadium	10,463
31	2018.09.01	Avispa Fukuoka	1-0	Oita Trinita	Level5 Stadium	10,120
32	2018.09.08	Avispa Fukuoka	0-1	Matsumoto Yamaga FC	Level5 Stadium	9,090
26	2018.09.12	Avispa Fukuoka	0-0	Yokohama FC	Level5 Stadium	7,307
33	2018.09.16	JEF United Chiba	3-3	Avispa Fukuoka	Fukuda Denshi Arena	10,588
34	2018.09.22	Ehime FC	2-3	Avispa Fukuoka	Ningineer Stadium	2,826
22	2018.09.26	Kyoto Sanga FC	1-0	Avispa Fukuoka	Kyoto Nishikyogoku Athletic Stadium	2,624
35	2018.09.29	Avispa Fukuoka	3-1	Omiya Ardija	Level5 Stadium	7,388
36	2018.10.06	Avispa Fukuoka	1-1	Fagiano Okayama	Level5 Stadium	7,444
37	2018.10.13	Renofa Yamaguchi FC	0-1	Avispa Fukuoka	Ishin Me-Life Stadium	7,015
38	2018.10.21	Montedio Yamagata	2-2	Avispa Fukuoka	ND Soft Stadium Yamagata	5,851
39	2018.10.28	Avispa Fukuoka	2-2	Zweigen Kanazawa	Level5 Stadium	13,008
40	2018.11.04	FC Machida Zelvia	2-1	Avispa Fukuoka	Machida Stadium	6,216
41	2018.11.11	Avispa Fukuoka	1-0	Roasso Kumamoto	Level5 Stadium	15,331
42	2018.11.17	FC Gifu	0-0	Avispa Fukuoka	Gifu Nagaragawa Stadium	8,870
