= 2013 Fagiano Okayama season =

Fagiano Okayama
2013 season
- Manager: Masanaga Kageyama
- Stadium: Kanko Stadium
- J2 League: 12th

2013 Fagiano Okayama season.

== League table ==
Pos	Team	Pld	W	D	L	GF	GA	GD	Pts
10	Montedio Yamagata	42	16	11	15	74	61	+13	59
11	Yokohama FC	42	15	13	14	49	46	+3	58
12	Fagiano Okayama	42	13	17	12	52	48	+4	56
13	Tokyo Verdy	42	14	14	14	52	58	−6	56
14	Avispa Fukuoka	42	15	11	16	47	54	−7	56

Updated to match(es) played on 8 December 2013. Source: J.League Division 2
Rules for classification: 1) points; 2) goal difference; 3) number of goals scored.

== J2 League ==
Match	Date	Team	Score	Team	Venue	Attendance
1	2013.03.03	Fagiano Okayama	1-1	V-Varen Nagasaki	Kanko Stadium	9,687
2	2013.03.10	Fagiano Okayama	0-0	Giravanz Kitakyushu	Kanko Stadium	6,356
3	2013.03.17	Tokyo Verdy	1-1	Fagiano Okayama	Ajinomoto Stadium	3,951
4	2013.03.20	Fagiano Okayama	1-1	Mito HollyHock	Kanko Stadium	6,279
5	2013.03.24	Yokohama FC	0-1	Fagiano Okayama	NHK Spring Mitsuzawa Football Stadium	4,271
6	2013.03.31	Ehime FC	0-1	Fagiano Okayama	Ningineer Stadium	3,776
7	2013.04.07	Fagiano Okayama	3-2	Consadole Sapporo	Kanko Stadium	6,310
8	2013.04.14	JEF United Chiba	0-0	Fagiano Okayama	Fukuda Denshi Arena	8,406
9	2013.04.17	Fagiano Okayama	1-1	Kyoto Sanga FC	Kanko Stadium	6,234
10	2013.04.21	Fagiano Okayama	2-0	Thespakusatsu Gunma	Kanko Stadium	6,983
11	2013.04.28	Vissel Kobe	3-3	Fagiano Okayama	Noevir Stadium Kobe	14,249
12	2013.05.03	Tochigi SC	1-0	Fagiano Okayama	Tochigi Green Stadium	4,702
13	2013.05.06	Fagiano Okayama	4-3	Montedio Yamagata	Kanko Stadium	11,117
14	2013.05.12	Gainare Tottori	0-0	Fagiano Okayama	Tottori Bank Bird Stadium	5,426
15	2013.05.19	Fagiano Okayama	2-0	Tokushima Vortis	Kanko Stadium	8,510
16	2013.05.26	Fagiano Okayama	2-3	Roasso Kumamoto	Kanko Stadium	8,356
17	2013.06.02	FC Gifu	0-0	Fagiano Okayama	Gifu Nagaragawa Stadium	2,665
18	2013.06.08	Matsumoto Yamaga FC	1-0	Fagiano Okayama	Matsumotodaira Park Stadium	10,015
19	2013.06.15	Fagiano Okayama	1-1	Avispa Fukuoka	Kanko Stadium	8,123
20	2013.06.22	Gamba Osaka	1-1	Fagiano Okayama	Expo '70 Commemorative Stadium	15,151
21	2013.06.29	Kataller Toyama	0-0	Fagiano Okayama	Toyama Stadium	3,632
22	2013.07.03	Fagiano Okayama	1-0	Vissel Kobe	Kanko Stadium	7,652
23	2013.07.07	Fagiano Okayama	0-0	Yokohama FC	Kanko Stadium	11,485
24	2013.07.14	Mito HollyHock	1-0	Fagiano Okayama	K's denki Stadium Mito	4,020
25	2013.07.20	Montedio Yamagata	1-2	Fagiano Okayama	ND Soft Stadium Yamagata	5,142
26	2013.07.27	Fagiano Okayama	1-2	FC Gifu	Kanko Stadium	7,807
27	2013.08.04	Fagiano Okayama	2-3	Gamba Osaka	Kanko Stadium	18,269
28	2013.08.12	Roasso Kumamoto	1-1	Fagiano Okayama	Umakana-Yokana Stadium	5,513
29	2013.08.18	Fagiano Okayama	2-0	Tokyo Verdy	Kanko Stadium	9,762
30	2013.08.21	Kyoto Sanga FC	2-4	Fagiano Okayama	Kyoto Nishikyogoku Athletic Stadium	6,267
31	2013.08.25	Fagiano Okayama	1-3	Tochigi SC	Kanko Stadium	8,046
32	2013.09.01	Consadole Sapporo	2-2	Fagiano Okayama	Sapporo Atsubetsu Stadium	6,792
33	2013.09.15	Fagiano Okayama	2-1	Matsumoto Yamaga FC	Kanko Stadium	7,289
34	2013.09.22	Giravanz Kitakyushu	2-1	Fagiano Okayama	Honjo Stadium	3,143
35	2013.09.29	Fagiano Okayama	3-0	JEF United Chiba	Kanko Stadium	9,550
36	2013.10.06	V-Varen Nagasaki	1-1	Fagiano Okayama	Nagasaki Stadium	4,304
37	2013.10.20	Fagiano Okayama	1-1	Ehime FC	Kanko Stadium	6,705
38	2013.10.27	Thespakusatsu Gunma	2-1	Fagiano Okayama	Shoda Shoyu Stadium Gunma	2,763
39	2013.11.03	Fagiano Okayama	2-0	Gainare Tottori	Kanko Stadium	6,782
40	2013.11.10	Tokushima Vortis	2-0	Fagiano Okayama	Pocarisweat Stadium	6,880
41	2013.11.17	Fagiano Okayama	1-3	Kataller Toyama	Kanko Stadium	8,754
42	2013.11.24	Avispa Fukuoka	2-0	Fagiano Okayama	Level5 Stadium	9,605
