= 2016 Kyoto Sanga FC season =

Kyoto Sanga FC
2016 season
- Manager: Kiyotaka Ishimaru
- Stadium: Kyoto Nishikyogoku Athletic Stadium
- J2 League: 5th
Home colours	Away colours

2016 Kyoto Sanga FC season.

== J2 League ==
=== League table ===
Pos	Team	Pld	W	D	L	GF	GA	GD	Pts	Promotion, qualification or relegation
4	Cerezo Osaka (O, P)	42	23	9	10	62	46	+16	78	Qualification for promotion playoffs (Note: Only teams that meet J1 license criteria can participate in promotion playoffs. If one or more teams fail to meet the criteria, only eligible teams that finished 3rd to 6th will participate and no replacement teams will be added.)
5	Kyoto Sanga	42	18	15	9	50	37	+13	69	Qualification for promotion playoffs
6	Fagiano Okayama	42	17	14	11	58	44	+14	65	Qualification for promotion playoffs

Updated to match(es) played on 20 November 2016. Source: 2016 MEIJI YASUDA J2 LEAGUE League table
Rules for classification: 1) Points; 2) Goal difference; 3) Goals scored
(O) Play-off winners; (P) Promoted

=== Match details ===
J2 League match details
Match	Date	Team	Score	Team	Venue	Attendance
1	2016.02.28	Kyoto Sanga FC	1-1	Mito HollyHock	Kyoto Nishikyogoku Athletic Stadium	6,983
2	2016.03.06	FC Machida Zelvia	1-1	Kyoto Sanga FC	Machida Stadium	3,805
3	2016.03.13	Fagiano Okayama	2-2	Kyoto Sanga FC	City Light Stadium	9,098
4	2016.03.20	Kyoto Sanga FC	0-0	V-Varen Nagasaki	Kyoto Nishikyogoku Athletic Stadium	5,658
5	2016.03.26	Hokkaido Consadole Sapporo	3-1	Kyoto Sanga FC	Sapporo Dome	9,341
6	2016.04.03	Kyoto Sanga FC	3-2	Montedio Yamagata	Kyoto Nishikyogoku Athletic Stadium	3,676
7	2016.04.09	Thespakusatsu Gunma	0-1	Kyoto Sanga FC	Shoda Shoyu Stadium Gunma	4,160
9	2016.04.23	Kyoto Sanga FC	0-1	Tokushima Vortis	Kyoto Nishikyogoku Athletic Stadium	4,731
10	2016.04.29	Cerezo Osaka	0-2	Kyoto Sanga FC	Kincho Stadium	14,883
11	2016.05.03	Kyoto Sanga FC	2-1	Shimizu S-Pulse	Kyoto Nishikyogoku Athletic Stadium	8,140
12	2016.05.07	Kyoto Sanga FC	1-1	JEF United Chiba	Kyoto Nishikyogoku Athletic Stadium	5,529
13	2016.05.15	Ehime FC	0-1	Kyoto Sanga FC	Ningineer Stadium	3,841
14	2016.05.22	Giravanz Kitakyushu	1-2	Kyoto Sanga FC	Honjo Stadium	3,682
15	2016.05.28	Kyoto Sanga FC	1-0	Yokohama FC	Kyoto Nishikyogoku Athletic Stadium	9,903
16	2016.06.04	Zweigen Kanazawa	1-1	Kyoto Sanga FC	Ishikawa Athletics Stadium	3,069
17	2016.06.08	Kamatamare Sanuki	1-3	Kyoto Sanga FC	Pikara Stadium	2,153
18	2016.06.12	Kyoto Sanga FC	3-0	Renofa Yamaguchi FC	Kyoto Nishikyogoku Athletic Stadium	5,925
19	2016.06.19	Tokyo Verdy	2-1	Kyoto Sanga FC	Ajinomoto Stadium	4,209
20	2016.06.26	Kyoto Sanga FC	1-2	Matsumoto Yamaga FC	Kyoto Nishikyogoku Athletic Stadium	5,970
8	2016.06.29	Kyoto Sanga FC	1-1	Roasso Kumamoto	Kyoto Nishikyogoku Athletic Stadium	2,884
21	2016.07.03	FC Gifu	0-1	Kyoto Sanga FC	Gifu Nagaragawa Stadium	4,126
22	2016.07.10	Kyoto Sanga FC	0-0	Thespakusatsu Gunma	Kyoto Nishikyogoku Athletic Stadium	4,545
23	2016.07.16	Tokushima Vortis	2-1	Kyoto Sanga FC	Pocarisweat Stadium	4,191
24	2016.07.20	Kyoto Sanga FC	1-0	Kamatamare Sanuki	Kyoto Nishikyogoku Athletic Stadium	4,458
25	2016.07.24	Renofa Yamaguchi FC	1-1	Kyoto Sanga FC	Ishin Memorial Park Stadium	5,226
26	2016.07.31	Kyoto Sanga FC	3-3	Cerezo Osaka	Kyoto Nishikyogoku Athletic Stadium	12,042
27	2016.08.07	Kyoto Sanga FC	2-0	Tokyo Verdy	Kyoto Nishikyogoku Athletic Stadium	6,030
28	2016.08.11	Montedio Yamagata	0-0	Kyoto Sanga FC	ND Soft Stadium Yamagata	14,450
29	2016.08.14	Kyoto Sanga FC	1-0	FC Machida Zelvia	Kyoto Nishikyogoku Athletic Stadium	4,622
30	2016.08.21	Kyoto Sanga FC	0-0	Hokkaido Consadole Sapporo	Kyoto Nishikyogoku Athletic Stadium	7,464
31	2016.09.11	Matsumoto Yamaga FC	2-0	Kyoto Sanga FC	Matsumotodaira Park Stadium	12,614
32	2016.09.18	Yokohama FC	2-0	Kyoto Sanga FC	NHK Spring Mitsuzawa Football Stadium	4,040
33	2016.09.25	Kyoto Sanga FC	0-0	Giravanz Kitakyushu	Kyoto Nishikyogoku Athletic Stadium	6,919
34	2016.10.02	Kyoto Sanga FC	0-0	Zweigen Kanazawa	Kyoto Nishikyogoku Athletic Stadium	8,320
35	2016.10.08	JEF United Chiba	0-3	Kyoto Sanga FC	Fukuda Denshi Arena	8,385
36	2016.10.16	Kyoto Sanga FC	1-0	FC Gifu	Kyoto Nishikyogoku Athletic Stadium	7,299
37	2016.10.23	Mito HollyHock	1-1	Kyoto Sanga FC	K's denki Stadium Mito	4,768
38	2016.10.30	Kyoto Sanga FC	2-0	Fagiano Okayama	Kyoto Nishikyogoku Athletic Stadium	8,714
39	2016.11.03	Shimizu S-Pulse	4-1	Kyoto Sanga FC	IAI Stadium Nihondaira	13,632
40	2016.11.06	Roasso Kumamoto	1-2	Kyoto Sanga FC	Umakana-Yokana Stadium	5,686
41	2016.11.12	Kyoto Sanga FC	0-1	Ehime FC	Kyoto Nishikyogoku Athletic Stadium	7,193
42	2016.11.20	V-Varen Nagasaki	0-2	Kyoto Sanga FC	Transcosmos Stadium Nagasaki	5,041
