= 2014 Fagiano Okayama season =

Fagiano Okayama
2014 season
- Manager: Masanaga Kageyama
- Stadium: Kanko Stadium
- J2 League: 8th

2014 Fagiano Okayama season.

== League table ==
Pos	Team	Pld	W	D	L	GF	GA	GD	Pts	Promotion or relegation
6	Montedio Yamagata (P)	42	18	10	14	57	44	+13	64	Qualification for Promotion Playoffs (Note: Only teams that meet J1 license criteria can participate in promotion playoffs. If one or more teams fail to meet the criteria, only eligible teams that finished 3rd to 6th will participate and no replacement teams will be added.)
7	Oita Trinita	42	17	12	13	52	55	−3	63	
8	Fagiano Okayama	42	15	16	11	52	48	+4	61	
9	Kyoto Sanga	42	14	18	10	57	52	+5	60	
10	Consadole Sapporo	42	15	14	13	48	44	+4	59	

Updated to match(es) played on 23 November 2014. Source: J.League data
Rules for classification: 1) points; 2) goal difference; 3) number of goals scored.
(P) Promoted

== J2 League ==
Match	Date	Team	Score	Team	Venue	Attendance
1	2014.03.02	Fagiano Okayama	0-0	Kataller Toyama	Kanko Stadium	9,577
2	2014.03.09	JEF United Chiba	1-0	Fagiano Okayama	Fukuda Denshi Arena	7,412
3	2014.03.16	Fagiano Okayama	1-2	Thespakusatsu Gunma	Kanko Stadium	6,312
4	2014.03.22	Mito HollyHock	0-1	Fagiano Okayama	K's denki Stadium Mito	4,695
5	2014.03.30	Fagiano Okayama	1-1	Oita Trinita	Kanko Stadium	6,401
6	2014.04.05	Shonan Bellmare	2-0	Fagiano Okayama	Shonan BMW Stadium Hiratsuka	7,117
7	2014.04.13	Tokyo Verdy	0-1	Fagiano Okayama	Tokyo National Stadium	5,473
8	2014.04.20	Fagiano Okayama	0-3	Giravanz Kitakyushu	Kanko Stadium	6,117
9	2014.04.26	Fagiano Okayama	2-0	Consadole Sapporo	Kanko Stadium	6,381
10	2014.04.29	Montedio Yamagata	0-2	Fagiano Okayama	ND Soft Stadium Yamagata	5,283
11	2014.05.03	Roasso Kumamoto	0-0	Fagiano Okayama	Umakana-Yokana Stadium	7,581
12	2014.05.06	Fagiano Okayama	1-1	Avispa Fukuoka	Kanko Stadium	10,743
13	2014.05.11	Tochigi SC	0-1	Fagiano Okayama	Tochigi Green Stadium	4,200
14	2014.05.18	Fagiano Okayama	2-1	FC Gifu	Kanko Stadium	10,756
15	2014.05.24	Fagiano Okayama	2-1	V-Varen Nagasaki	Kanko Stadium	7,290
16	2014.05.31	Júbilo Iwata	1-1	Fagiano Okayama	Yamaha Stadium	8,016
17	2014.06.07	Fagiano Okayama	0-0	Matsumoto Yamaga FC	Kanko Stadium	7,484
18	2014.06.14	Ehime FC	2-3	Fagiano Okayama	Ningineer Stadium	4,750
19	2014.06.21	Fagiano Okayama	0-0	Yokohama FC	Kanko Stadium	8,287
20	2014.06.28	Kyoto Sanga FC	1-1	Fagiano Okayama	Kyoto Nishikyogoku Athletic Stadium	12,452
21	2014.07.05	Fagiano Okayama	2-2	Kamatamare Sanuki	Kanko Stadium	12,359
22	2014.07.20	Avispa Fukuoka	2-3	Fagiano Okayama	Level5 Stadium	5,482
23	2014.07.26	Fagiano Okayama	3-1	Tochigi SC	Kanko Stadium	7,528
24	2014.07.30	FC Gifu	2-2	Fagiano Okayama	Gifu Nagaragawa Stadium	5,212
25	2014.08.03	Fagiano Okayama	2-1	Tokyo Verdy	Kanko Stadium	8,123
26	2014.08.10	Fagiano Okayama	0-0	Shonan Bellmare	Kanko Stadium	9,811
27	2014.08.17	Giravanz Kitakyushu	2-1	Fagiano Okayama	Honjo Stadium	4,223
28	2014.08.24	Fagiano Okayama	1-0	JEF United Chiba	Kanko Stadium	7,548
29	2014.08.31	Kamatamare Sanuki	2-1	Fagiano Okayama	Kagawa Marugame Stadium	7,722
30	2014.09.06	Fagiano Okayama	1-1	Júbilo Iwata	Kanko Stadium	12,033
31	2014.09.14	Matsumoto Yamaga FC	1-2	Fagiano Okayama	Matsumotodaira Park Stadium	17,044
32	2014.09.20	Fagiano Okayama	1-1	Ehime FC	Kanko Stadium	8,599
33	2014.09.23	Consadole Sapporo	3-1	Fagiano Okayama	Sapporo Dome	12,804
34	2014.09.28	Fagiano Okayama	1-1	Mito HollyHock	Kanko Stadium	7,980
35	2014.10.04	V-Varen Nagasaki	1-1	Fagiano Okayama	Nagasaki City Kakidomari Stadium	3,017
36	2014.10.11	Thespakusatsu Gunma	3-2	Fagiano Okayama	Shoda Shoyu Stadium Gunma	2,960
37	2014.10.19	Fagiano Okayama	1-4	Montedio Yamagata	Kanko Stadium	7,826
38	2014.10.26	Oita Trinita	1-0	Fagiano Okayama	Oita Bank Dome	7,267
39	2014.11.01	Fagiano Okayama	2-3	Kyoto Sanga FC	Kanko Stadium	7,032
40	2014.11.09	Yokohama FC	0-2	Fagiano Okayama	NHK Spring Mitsuzawa Football Stadium	8,702
41	2014.11.15	Fagiano Okayama	1-1	Roasso Kumamoto	Kanko Stadium	8,290
42	2014.11.23	Kataller Toyama	0-3	Fagiano Okayama	Toyama Stadium	4,842
