= Hayato Kurosaki =

Japanese footballer

Personal information
- Full name: Hayato Kurosaki
- Date of birth: 5 September 1996 (age 30)
- Place of birth: Utsunomiya, Tochigi, Japan
- Height: 1.82 m (6 ft 0 in)
- Position: Defender

Team information
- Current team: FC Osaka
- Number: 15

Youth career
- Okamoto FC
- –2014: Tochigi SC

College career
Years	Team	Apps	(Gls)
2015–2018	Hosei University		

Senior career*
Years	Team	Apps	(Gls)
2019–2024	Tochigi SC	108	(4)
2021	→ Oita Trinita (loan)	5	(0)
2025–	FC Osaka	5	(0)
- * Club domestic league appearances and goals as of 1 January 2026

Hayato Kurosaki (黒﨑 隼人, Kurosaki Hayato; born 5 September 1996) is a Japanese footballer currently playing as a defender for FC Osaka.

== Early life ==
Hayato was born in Utsunomiya. He played for Tochigi's youth team before going to Hosei University.

== Career ==
Hayato made his debut for Tochigi on the 19th of August 2020.

== Career statistics ==
=== Club ===
As of 10 November 2020.

Club	Season	League			National Cup		League Cup		Other		Total	
Club	Season	Division	Apps	Goals	Apps	Goals	Apps	Goals	Apps	Goals	Apps	Goals
Tochigi SC	2019	J2 League	0	0	0	0	0	0	0	0	0	0
Tochigi SC	2020	J2 League	16	0	0	0	0	0	0	0	16	0
Career total			16	0	0	0	0	0	0	0	16	0
