= Yu Yasukawa =

Japanese football player (born 1988)

Yu Yasukawa 安川 有
Personal information
- Full name: Yu Yasukawa
- Date of birth: May 24, 1988 (age 38)
- Place of birth: Fukuoka, Japan
- Height: 1.83 m (6 ft 0 in)
- Position: Defender

Youth career
- 2007–2010: Doshisha University

Senior career*
Years	Team	Apps	(Gls)
2011–2015	Oita Trinita	136	(4)
2016–2018	Matsumoto Yamaga	31	(4)
- * Club domestic league appearances and goals as of 29 December 2018

Yu Yasukawa (安川 有, Yasukawa Yū; born May 24, 1988) is a Japanese footballer.

== Club statistics ==
Updated to 23 February 2018.

Club performance			League		Cup		League Cup		Other		Total	
Season	Club	League	Apps	Goals	Apps	Goals	Apps	Goals	Apps	Goals	Apps	Goals
Japan			League		Emperor's Cup		J. League Cup		Other^{1}		Total	
2011	Oita Trinita	J2 League	19	0	0	0	-		-		19	0
2012	Oita Trinita	J2 League	26	0	1	0	-		2	0	29	0
2013	Oita Trinita	J1 League	24	2	1	0	4	0	-		29	2
2014	Oita Trinita	J2 League	31	2	1	0	-		-		32	2
2015	Oita Trinita	J2 League	36	0	1	0	-		2	0	39	0
2016	Matsumoto Yamaga	J2 League	5	0	1	0	–		–		6	0
2017	Matsumoto Yamaga	J2 League	21	4	0	0	–		–		21	4
Total			162	8	5	0	4	0	4	0	175	8

^{1}Includes Promotion and Relegation Playoffs.
