= Goh Dong-min =

South Korean footballer (born 1999)

Personal information
- Date of birth: 12 January 1999 (age 27)
- Place of birth: South Korea
- Height: 1.90 m (6 ft 3 in)
- Position: Goalkeeper

Team information
- Current team: Daegu FC
- Number: 1

Youth career
- 2010: Ganggu Elementary School
- 2012–2013: Ganggu Middle School
- 2014–2016: Daeryun High School
- 2017–2020: Matsumoto Yamaga

Senior career*
| Years | Team | Apps | (Gls) |
| 2020–2022 | Matsumoto Yamaga | 0 | (0) |
| 2020 | → Vanraure Hachinohe (loan) | 19 | (0) |
| 2022 | → Gyeongnam FC (loan) | 6 | (0) |
| 2022–2025 | Gyeongnam FC | 72 | (0) |
| 2026– | Daegu FC | 1 | (0) |

International career^{‡}
| 2019 | South Korea U20 | 1 | (0) |
| 2022– | South Korea U23 | 3 | (0) |
- * Club domestic league appearances and goals as of 16 May 2026 ‡ National team caps and goals as of 17:04, 8 June 2022 (UTC)

- Goh Dong-min
- Hangul: 고동민
- RR: Go Dongmin
- MR: Ko Tongmin

Goh Dong-min (Korean: 고동민; born 12 January 1999) is a South Korean footballer who currently plays as a goalkeeper for K League 2 club Daegu FC.

== Career statistics ==
=== Club ===
As of 7 July 2022.

| Club | Season | League | | | National Cup | | League Cup | | Other | | Total | |
| Club | Season | Division | Apps | Goals | Apps | Goals | Apps | Goals | Apps | Goals | Apps | Goals |
|---|---|---|---|---|---|---|---|---|---|---|---|---|
| Matsumoto Yamaga | 2020 | J2 League | 0 | 0 | 0 | 0 | 0 | 0 | 0 | 0 | 0 | 0 |
| Matsumoto Yamaga | 2021 | J2 League | 0 | 0 | 0 | 0 | 0 | 0 | 0 | 0 | 0 | 0 |
| Matsumoto Yamaga | Total | | 0 | 0 | 0 | 0 | 0 | 0 | 0 | 0 | 0 | 0 |
| Vanraure Hachinohe (loan) | 2020 | J3 League | 19 | 0 | 0 | 0 | – | | 0 | 0 | 19 | 0 |
| Gyeongnam FC (loan) | 2022 | K League 2 | 6 | 0 | 1 (Note: Appearances at the Korean FA Cup) | 0 | – | | 0 | 0 | 7 | 0 |
| Gyeongnam FC | 2022 | K League 2 | 0 | 0 | 0 | 0 | – | | 0 | 0 | 0 | 0 |
| Career total | | | 25 | 0 | 1 | 0 | 0 | 0 | 0 | 0 | 26 | 0 |
