= Tatsuki Kohatsu =

Japanese footballer

Tatsuki Kohatsu 古波津 辰希
Personal information
- Full name: Tatsuki Kohatsu
- Date of birth: September 11, 1993 (age 33)
- Place of birth: Okinawa, Japan
- Height: 1.74 m (5 ft 8 1/2 in)
- Position: Midfielder

Team information
- Current team: Tochigi City
- Number: 16

Youth career
- 2012–2015: Ryutsu Keizai University

Senior career*
Years	Team	Apps	(Gls)
2016–2019	Tochigi SC	38	(0)
2020–	Tochigi City	1	(0)
- * Club domestic league appearances and goals as of 12:45, 12 July 2020 (UTC)

Tatsuki Kohatsu (古波津 辰希, Kohatsu Tatsuki; born September 11, 1993) is a Japanese football player. He plays for Tochigi City FC.

== Career ==
Tatsuki Kohatsu joined J3 League club Tochigi SC in 2016.

== Club statistics ==
Updated to 22 February 2020.

Club performance			League		Cup		Total	
Season	Club	League	Apps	Goals	Apps	Goals	Apps	Goals
Japan			League		Emperor's Cup		Total	
2016	Tochigi SC	J3 League	11	0	–		11	0
2017	Tochigi SC	J3 League	5	0	–		5	0
2018	Tochigi SC	J2 League	9	0	0	0	9	0
2019	Tochigi SC	J2 League	13	0	2	0	15	0
Total			38	0	2	0	40	0
