= 2013 Kyoto Sanga FC season =

Kyoto Sanga FC
2013 season
- Manager: Takeshi Oki
- Stadium: Kyoto Nishikyogoku Athletic Stadium
- J2 League: 3rd
Home colours	Away colours

2013 Kyoto Sanga FC season.

== J2 League ==
Match	Date	Team	Score	Team	Venue	Attendance
1	2013.03.03	Gamba Osaka	3-3	Kyoto Sanga FC	Expo '70 Commemorative Stadium	18,041
2	2013.03.10	Kyoto Sanga FC	0-0	Tokyo Verdy	Kyoto Nishikyogoku Athletic Stadium	7,293
3	2013.03.17	Avispa Fukuoka	1-2	Kyoto Sanga FC	Level5 Stadium	4,614
4	2013.03.20	Kyoto Sanga FC	4-1	Vissel Kobe	Kyoto Nishikyogoku Athletic Stadium	9,485
5	2013.03.24	Kataller Toyama	1-0	Kyoto Sanga FC	Toyama Stadium	4,353
6	2013.03.31	Kyoto Sanga FC	1-2	Tokushima Vortis	Kyoto Nishikyogoku Athletic Stadium	6,128
7	2013.04.07	FC Gifu	0-3	Kyoto Sanga FC	Gifu Nagaragawa Stadium	3,264
8	2013.04.14	Kyoto Sanga FC	0-1	Yokohama FC	Kyoto Nishikyogoku Athletic Stadium	7,860
9	2013.04.17	Fagiano Okayama	1-1	Kyoto Sanga FC	Kanko Stadium	6,234
10	2013.04.21	Kyoto Sanga FC	3-0	Gainare Tottori	Kyoto Nishikyogoku Athletic Stadium	4,692
11	2013.04.28	Kyoto Sanga FC	3-3	JEF United Chiba	Kyoto Nishikyogoku Athletic Stadium	8,594
12	2013.05.03	Consadole Sapporo	0-1	Kyoto Sanga FC	Sapporo Dome	11,981
13	2013.05.06	Kyoto Sanga FC	0-1	Matsumoto Yamaga FC	Kyoto Nishikyogoku Athletic Stadium	6,424
14	2013.05.12	Kyoto Sanga FC	2-1	Thespakusatsu Gunma	Kyoto Nishikyogoku Athletic Stadium	7,078
15	2013.05.19	V-Varen Nagasaki	0-1	Kyoto Sanga FC	Nagasaki City Kakidomari Stadium	3,940
16	2013.05.26	Montedio Yamagata	1-2	Kyoto Sanga FC	ND Soft Stadium Yamagata	6,811
17	2013.06.03	Kyoto Sanga FC	1-2	Giravanz Kitakyushu	Kyoto Nishikyogoku Athletic Stadium	5,297
18	2013.06.09	Roasso Kumamoto	1-3	Kyoto Sanga FC	Umakana-Yokana Stadium	5,460
19	2013.06.15	Kyoto Sanga FC	4-1	Ehime FC	Kyoto Nishikyogoku Athletic Stadium	10,643
20	2013.06.22	Kyoto Sanga FC	0-1	Mito HollyHock	Kyoto Nishikyogoku Athletic Stadium	10,120
21	2013.06.29	Tochigi SC	2-2	Kyoto Sanga FC	Tochigi Green Stadium	4,784
22	2013.07.03	Tokyo Verdy	0-5	Kyoto Sanga FC	Ajinomoto Stadium	2,539
23	2013.07.07	Kyoto Sanga FC	2-0	FC Gifu	Kyoto Nishikyogoku Athletic Stadium	7,923
24	2013.07.14	Matsumoto Yamaga FC	1-1	Kyoto Sanga FC	Matsumotodaira Park Stadium	12,151
25	2013.07.20	Giravanz Kitakyushu	1-1	Kyoto Sanga FC	Honjo Stadium	2,555
26	2013.07.27	Kyoto Sanga FC	2-1	Avispa Fukuoka	Kyoto Nishikyogoku Athletic Stadium	7,885
27	2013.08.04	Kyoto Sanga FC	1-1	Montedio Yamagata	Kyoto Nishikyogoku Athletic Stadium	6,424
28	2013.08.11	Ehime FC	2-0	Kyoto Sanga FC	Ningineer Stadium	4,048
29	2013.08.18	Yokohama FC	1-0	Kyoto Sanga FC	NHK Spring Mitsuzawa Football Stadium	5,309
30	2013.08.21	Kyoto Sanga FC	2-4	Fagiano Okayama	Kyoto Nishikyogoku Athletic Stadium	6,267
31	2013.08.25	Tokushima Vortis	1-1	Kyoto Sanga FC	Pocarisweat Stadium	5,129
32	2013.09.01	Kyoto Sanga FC	2-0	Roasso Kumamoto	Kyoto Nishikyogoku Athletic Stadium	4,314
33	2013.09.15	JEF United Chiba	1-2	Kyoto Sanga FC	Fukuda Denshi Arena	10,187
34	2013.09.22	Kyoto Sanga FC	3-2	Kataller Toyama	Kagoshima Kamoike Stadium	5,594
35	2013.09.29	Kyoto Sanga FC	2-0	V-Varen Nagasaki	Kyoto Nishikyogoku Athletic Stadium	9,226
36	2013.10.06	Gainare Tottori	0-1	Kyoto Sanga FC	Tottori Bank Bird Stadium	3,907
37	2013.10.20	Thespakusatsu Gunma	2-3	Kyoto Sanga FC	Shoda Shoyu Stadium Gunma	2,781
38	2013.10.27	Kyoto Sanga FC	2-0	Consadole Sapporo	Kyoto Nishikyogoku Athletic Stadium	8,590
39	2013.11.03	Vissel Kobe	0-0	Kyoto Sanga FC	Noevir Stadium Kobe	22,468
40	2013.11.10	Kyoto Sanga FC	0-2	Gamba Osaka	Kyoto Nishikyogoku Athletic Stadium	15,380
41	2013.11.17	Mito HollyHock	2-1	Kyoto Sanga FC	K's denki Stadium Mito	8,266
42	2013.11.24	Kyoto Sanga FC	1-2	Tochigi SC	Kyoto Nishikyogoku Athletic Stadium	10,500
