= 2015 Kyoto Sanga FC season =

Kyoto Sanga FC
2015 season
- Manager: Masahiro Wada; Kiyotaka Ishimaru
- Stadium: Kyoto Nishikyogoku Athletic Stadium
- J2 League: 17th
Home colours	Away colours

2015 Kyoto Sanga FC season.

== J2 League ==
=== League table ===
Pos	Team	Pld	W	D	L	GF	GA	GD	Pts
16	Kamatamare Sanuki	42	12	15	15	30	33	−3	51
17	Kyoto Sanga	42	12	14	16	45	51	−6	50
18	Thespakusatsu Gunma	42	13	9	20	34	56	−22	48

Source: Meiji Yasuda J2 League Standing
Rules for classification: 1) Points; 2) Goal difference; 3) Goals scored

=== Match details ===
J2 League match details
Match	Date	Team	Score	Team	Venue	Attendance
1	2015.03.08	Avispa Fukuoka	1-3	Kyoto Sanga FC	Level5 Stadium	13,804
2	2015.03.15	Kyoto Sanga FC	0-2	Júbilo Iwata	Kyoto Nishikyogoku Athletic Stadium	16,920
3	2015.03.21	Omiya Ardija	2-1	Kyoto Sanga FC	NACK5 Stadium Omiya	7,173
4	2015.03.29	Kyoto Sanga FC	1-1	Kamatamare Sanuki	Kyoto Nishikyogoku Athletic Stadium	4,420
5	2015.04.01	Consadole Sapporo	1-2	Kyoto Sanga FC	Sapporo Dome	8,193
6	2015.04.05	Kyoto Sanga FC	0-2	JEF United Chiba	Kyoto Nishikyogoku Athletic Stadium	4,206
7	2015.04.11	Kyoto Sanga FC	1-4	V-Varen Nagasaki	Kyoto Nishikyogoku Athletic Stadium	6,095
8	2015.04.19	Tokushima Vortis	1-0	Kyoto Sanga FC	Pocarisweat Stadium	4,552
9	2015.04.26	Kyoto Sanga FC	2-0	Giravanz Kitakyushu	Kyoto Nishikyogoku Athletic Stadium	7,712
10	2015.04.29	Cerezo Osaka	3-0	Kyoto Sanga FC	Kincho Stadium	14,631
11	2015.05.03	Kyoto Sanga FC	0-1	Thespakusatsu Gunma	Kyoto Nishikyogoku Athletic Stadium	6,289
12	2015.05.06	FC Gifu	1-1	Kyoto Sanga FC	Gifu Nagaragawa Stadium	8,463
13	2015.05.09	Kyoto Sanga FC	1-1	Tokyo Verdy	Kyoto Nishikyogoku Athletic Stadium	6,146
14	2015.05.17	Ehime FC	3-2	Kyoto Sanga FC	Ningineer Stadium	3,291
15	2015.05.24	Mito HollyHock	0-2	Kyoto Sanga FC	K's denki Stadium Mito	4,023
16	2015.05.31	Kyoto Sanga FC	2-1	Roasso Kumamoto	Kyoto Nishikyogoku Athletic Stadium	7,827
17	2015.06.06	Oita Trinita	2-2	Kyoto Sanga FC	Oita Bank Dome	5,355
18	2015.06.14	Kyoto Sanga FC	1-2	Yokohama FC	Kyoto Nishikyogoku Athletic Stadium	14,811
19	2015.06.21	Kyoto Sanga FC	1-2	Tochigi SC	Kyoto Nishikyogoku Athletic Stadium	3,904
20	2015.06.28	Zweigen Kanazawa	1-3	Kyoto Sanga FC	Ishikawa Athletics Stadium	6,590
21	2015.07.04	Fagiano Okayama	2-0	Kyoto Sanga FC	City Light Stadium	7,329
22	2015.07.08	Kyoto Sanga FC	0-1	Tokushima Vortis	Kyoto Nishikyogoku Athletic Stadium	3,793
23	2015.07.12	V-Varen Nagasaki	1-0	Kyoto Sanga FC	Nagasaki Stadium	2,893
24	2015.07.18	Kyoto Sanga FC	1-0	Cerezo Osaka	Kyoto Nishikyogoku Athletic Stadium	13,998
25	2015.07.22	Kyoto Sanga FC	1-2	Avispa Fukuoka	Kyoto Nishikyogoku Athletic Stadium	3,206
26	2015.07.26	Tokyo Verdy	1-0	Kyoto Sanga FC	Ajinomoto Stadium	4,908
27	2015.08.01	Kyoto Sanga FC	2-0	Consadole Sapporo	Kyoto Nishikyogoku Athletic Stadium	7,096
28	2015.08.08	Júbilo Iwata	3-3	Kyoto Sanga FC	Yamaha Stadium	10,391
29	2015.08.15	Kyoto Sanga FC	2-1	Oita Trinita	Kyoto Nishikyogoku Athletic Stadium	6,166
30	2015.08.23	Kyoto Sanga FC	1-1	Zweigen Kanazawa	Kyoto Nishikyogoku Athletic Stadium	5,887
31	2015.09.13	JEF United Chiba	1-1	Kyoto Sanga FC	Fukuda Denshi Arena	8,956
32	2015.09.20	Roasso Kumamoto	0-0	Kyoto Sanga FC	Umakana-Yokana Stadium	7,051
33	2015.09.23	Kyoto Sanga FC	0-0	Fagiano Okayama	Kyoto Nishikyogoku Athletic Stadium	7,349
34	2015.09.27	Kamatamare Sanuki	1-1	Kyoto Sanga FC	Pikara Stadium	2,585
35	2015.10.04	Thespakusatsu Gunma	1-1	Kyoto Sanga FC	Shoda Shoyu Stadium Gunma	3,914
36	2015.10.10	Kyoto Sanga FC	0-0	FC Gifu	Kyoto Nishikyogoku Athletic Stadium	10,879
37	2015.10.18	Yokohama FC	0-0	Kyoto Sanga FC	NHK Spring Mitsuzawa Football Stadium	7,464
38	2015.10.25	Kyoto Sanga FC	2-2	Omiya Ardija	Kyoto Nishikyogoku Athletic Stadium	9,380
39	2015.11.01	Giravanz Kitakyushu	1-2	Kyoto Sanga FC	Honjo Stadium	2,688
40	2015.11.08	Kyoto Sanga FC	0-1	Ehime FC	Kyoto Nishikyogoku Athletic Stadium	3,681
41	2015.11.14	Tochigi SC	0-1	Kyoto Sanga FC	Tochigi Green Stadium	4,143
42	2015.11.23	Kyoto Sanga FC	2-1	Mito HollyHock	Kyoto Nishikyogoku Athletic Stadium	7,541
