= 2016 Matsumoto Yamaga FC season =

Matsumoto Yamaga FC
2016 season
- Manager: Yasuharu Sorimachi
- Stadium: Matsumotodaira Park Stadium
- J2 League: 3rd

2016 Matsumoto Yamaga FC season.

== J2 League ==
=== League table ===
Pos	Team	Pld	W	D	L	GF	GA	GD	Pts	Promotion, qualification or relegation
2	Shimizu S-Pulse (P)	42	25	9	8	85	37	+48	84	Promotion to 2017 J1 League
3	Matsumoto Yamaga	42	24	12	6	62	32	+30	84	Qualification for promotion playoffs (Note: Only teams that meet J1 license criteria can participate in promotion playoffs. If one or more teams fail to meet the criteria, only eligible teams that finished 3rd to 6th will participate and no replacement teams will be added.)
4	Cerezo Osaka (O, P)	42	23	9	10	62	46	+16	78	Qualification for promotion playoffs

Updated to match(es) played on 20 November 2016. Source: 2016 MEIJI YASUDA J2 LEAGUE League table
Rules for classification: 1) Points; 2) Goal difference; 3) Goals scored
(O) Play-off winners; (P) Promoted

=== Match details ===
J2 League match details
Match	Date	Team	Score	Team	Venue	Attendance
1	2016.02.28	Roasso Kumamoto	1-0	Matsumoto Yamaga FC	Umakana-Yokana Stadium	8,253
2	2016.03.06	Yokohama FC	0-2	Matsumoto Yamaga FC	NHK Spring Mitsuzawa Football Stadium	4,669
3	2016.03.13	Shimizu S-Pulse	0-0	Matsumoto Yamaga FC	IAI Stadium Nihondaira	13,078
4	2016.03.20	Matsumoto Yamaga FC	0-1	JEF United Chiba	Matsumotodaira Park Stadium	17,284
5	2016.03.26	Matsumoto Yamaga FC	3-3	Renofa Yamaguchi FC	Matsumotodaira Park Stadium	10,895
6	2016.04.03	V-Varen Nagasaki	1-1	Matsumoto Yamaga FC	Nagasaki Stadium	3,702
7	2016.04.09	Matsumoto Yamaga FC	1-0	Tokushima Vortis	Matsumotodaira Park Stadium	10,976
8	2016.04.17	FC Gifu	0-2	Matsumoto Yamaga FC	Gifu Nagaragawa Stadium	6,295
9	2016.04.23	Matsumoto Yamaga FC	2-1	Thespakusatsu Gunma	Matsumotodaira Park Stadium	12,034
10	2016.04.29	Ehime FC	0-0	Matsumoto Yamaga FC	Ningineer Stadium	4,235
11	2016.05.03	Matsumoto Yamaga FC	0-1	Cerezo Osaka	Matsumotodaira Park Stadium	17,302
12	2016.05.07	Tokyo Verdy	0-4	Matsumoto Yamaga FC	Ajinomoto Stadium	8,664
13	2016.05.15	Matsumoto Yamaga FC	0-0	Kamatamare Sanuki	Matsumotodaira Park Stadium	11,402
14	2016.05.22	Matsumoto Yamaga FC	1-0	FC Machida Zelvia	Matsumotodaira Park Stadium	12,462
15	2016.05.29	Zweigen Kanazawa	0-2	Matsumoto Yamaga FC	Ishikawa Athletics Stadium	7,636
16	2016.06.04	Matsumoto Yamaga FC	2-1	Giravanz Kitakyushu	Matsumotodaira Park Stadium	11,140
17	2016.06.08	Matsumoto Yamaga FC	3-2	Hokkaido Consadole Sapporo	Matsumotodaira Park Stadium	10,796
18	2016.06.12	Fagiano Okayama	2-1	Matsumoto Yamaga FC	City Light Stadium	8,193
19	2016.06.19	Matsumoto Yamaga FC	1-0	Montedio Yamagata	Matsumotodaira Park Stadium	12,141
20	2016.06.26	Kyoto Sanga FC	1-2	Matsumoto Yamaga FC	Kyoto Nishikyogoku Athletic Stadium	5,970
21	2016.07.03	Mito HollyHock	2-3	Matsumoto Yamaga FC	K's denki Stadium Mito	5,328
22	2016.07.10	Matsumoto Yamaga FC	4-2	Zweigen Kanazawa	Matsumotodaira Park Stadium	13,323
23	2016.07.16	Giravanz Kitakyushu	1-2	Matsumoto Yamaga FC	Honjo Stadium	3,125
24	2016.07.20	Hokkaido Consadole Sapporo	1-0	Matsumoto Yamaga FC	Sapporo Dome	12,901
25	2016.07.24	Matsumoto Yamaga FC	1-0	V-Varen Nagasaki	Matsumotodaira Park Stadium	12,547
26	2016.07.31	Tokushima Vortis	2-2	Matsumoto Yamaga FC	Pocarisweat Stadium	4,642
27	2016.08.07	Matsumoto Yamaga FC	0-0	Mito HollyHock	Matsumotodaira Park Stadium	13,379
28	2016.08.11	Matsumoto Yamaga FC	1-1	FC Gifu	Matsumotodaira Park Stadium	15,602
29	2016.08.14	Cerezo Osaka	0-1	Matsumoto Yamaga FC	Kincho Stadium	13,593
30	2016.08.21	Renofa Yamaguchi FC	0-0	Matsumoto Yamaga FC	Ishin Memorial Park Stadium	6,408
31	2016.09.11	Matsumoto Yamaga FC	2-0	Kyoto Sanga FC	Matsumotodaira Park Stadium	12,614
32	2016.09.18	Thespakusatsu Gunma	1-1	Matsumoto Yamaga FC	Shoda Shoyu Stadium Gunma	9,804
33	2016.09.25	Matsumoto Yamaga FC	1-0	Shimizu S-Pulse	Matsumotodaira Park Stadium	17,880
34	2016.10.02	Kamatamare Sanuki	2-4	Matsumoto Yamaga FC	Pikara Stadium	3,082
35	2016.10.08	Matsumoto Yamaga FC	1-1	Fagiano Okayama	Matsumotodaira Park Stadium	12,648
36	2016.10.16	JEF United Chiba	0-3	Matsumoto Yamaga FC	Fukuda Denshi Arena	12,732
37	2016.10.23	Matsumoto Yamaga FC	1-1	Ehime FC	Matsumotodaira Park Stadium	13,605
38	2016.10.30	Montedio Yamagata	0-1	Matsumoto Yamaga FC	ND Soft Stadium Yamagata	7,257
39	2016.11.03	Matsumoto Yamaga FC	1-0	Roasso Kumamoto	Matsumotodaira Park Stadium	13,241
40	2016.11.06	Matsumoto Yamaga FC	2-0	Tokyo Verdy	Matsumotodaira Park Stadium	15,343
41	2016.11.12	FC Machida Zelvia	2-1	Matsumoto Yamaga FC	Machida Stadium	9,519
42	2016.11.20	Matsumoto Yamaga FC	3-2	Yokohama FC	Matsumotodaira Park Stadium	19,632
