= 2018 Matsumoto Yamaga FC season =

Matsumoto Yamaga FC
2018 season
- Manager: Yasuharu Sorimachi
- Stadium: Sunpro Alwin
- J2 League: 1st

2018 Matsumoto Yamaga FC season.

== J2 League ==
| Match | Date | Team | Score | Team | Venue | Attendance |
|---|---|---|---|---|---|---|
| 1 | 2018.02.25 | Yokohama FC | 0-0 | Matsumoto Yamaga FC | NHK Spring Mitsuzawa Football Stadium | 10,779 |
| 2 | 2018.03.03 | Albirex Niigata | 1-1 | Matsumoto Yamaga FC | Denka Big Swan Stadium | 22,465 |
| 3 | 2018.03.11 | Tokyo Verdy | 2-1 | Matsumoto Yamaga FC | Ajinomoto Stadium | 8,812 |
| 4 | 2018.03.17 | Matsumoto Yamaga FC | 1-1 | Fagiano Okayama | Yamanashi Chuo Bank Stadium | 9,540 |
| 5 | 2018.03.21 | FC Machida Zelvia | 2-1 | Matsumoto Yamaga FC | Machida Stadium | 3,037 |
| 6 | 2018.03.25 | Renofa Yamaguchi FC | 2-2 | Matsumoto Yamaga FC | Ishin Me-Life Stadium | 6,318 |
| 7 | 2018.04.01 | Matsumoto Yamaga FC | 3-2 | Omiya Ardija | Matsumotodaira Park Stadium | 15,871 |
| 8 | 2018.04.08 | Matsumoto Yamaga FC | 1-1 | Kamatamare Sanuki | Matsumotodaira Park Stadium | 12,110 |
| 9 | 2018.04.14 | Ventforet Kofu | 0-1 | Matsumoto Yamaga FC | Yamanashi Chuo Bank Stadium | 9,659 |
| 10 | 2018.04.22 | Matsumoto Yamaga FC | 1-0 | Montedio Yamagata | Matsumotodaira Park Stadium | 12,038 |
| 11 | 2018.04.28 | Ehime FC | 1-1 | Matsumoto Yamaga FC | Ningineer Stadium | 3,207 |
| 12 | 2018.05.03 | Matsumoto Yamaga FC | 2-0 | Mito HollyHock | Matsumotodaira Park Stadium | 15,110 |
| 13 | 2018.05.06 | FC Gifu | 2-0 | Matsumoto Yamaga FC | Gifu Nagaragawa Stadium | 7,018 |
| 14 | 2018.05.12 | Matsumoto Yamaga FC | 5-0 | Zweigen Kanazawa | Matsumotodaira Park Stadium | 11,333 |
| 15 | 2018.05.20 | Matsumoto Yamaga FC | 1-0 | Avispa Fukuoka | Matsumotodaira Park Stadium | 12,659 |
| 16 | 2018.05.26 | Tokushima Vortis | 1-1 | Matsumoto Yamaga FC | Pocarisweat Stadium | 5,312 |
| 17 | 2018.06.03 | Matsumoto Yamaga FC | 1-0 | Tochigi SC | Matsumotodaira Park Stadium | 12,334 |
| 18 | 2018.06.09 | Kyoto Sanga FC | 0-1 | Matsumoto Yamaga FC | Kyoto Nishikyogoku Athletic Stadium | 8,149 |
| 19 | 2018.06.16 | Matsumoto Yamaga FC | 1-4 | Oita Trinita | Matsumotodaira Park Stadium | 11,942 |
| 20 | 2018.06.23 | Matsumoto Yamaga FC | 4-2 | JEF United Chiba | Matsumotodaira Park Stadium | 11,475 |
| 21 | 2018.06.30 | Roasso Kumamoto | 1-3 | Matsumoto Yamaga FC | Egao Kenko Stadium | 10,194 |
| 22 | 2018.07.07 | Matsumoto Yamaga FC | 2-0 | Albirex Niigata | Matsumotodaira Park Stadium | 14,166 |
| 23 | 2018.07.16 | Fagiano Okayama | 0-0 | Matsumoto Yamaga FC | City Light Stadium | 7,780 |
| 24 | 2018.07.21 | Matsumoto Yamaga FC | 1-0 | Kyoto Sanga FC | Matsumotodaira Park Stadium | 12,003 |
| 25 | 2018.07.25 | Omiya Ardija | 1-2 | Matsumoto Yamaga FC | NACK5 Stadium Omiya | 9,329 |
| 26 | 2018.07.29 | Matsumoto Yamaga FC | 1-0 | Ventforet Kofu | Matsumotodaira Park Stadium | 14,197 |
| 27 | 2018.08.04 | JEF United Chiba | 2-3 | Matsumoto Yamaga FC | Fukuda Denshi Arena | 12,336 |
| 28 | 2018.08.11 | Kamatamare Sanuki | 0-1 | Matsumoto Yamaga FC | Pikara Stadium | 2,981 |
| 29 | 2018.08.18 | Matsumoto Yamaga FC | 0-1 | FC Machida Zelvia | Matsumotodaira Park Stadium | 15,841 |
| 30 | 2018.08.25 | Matsumoto Yamaga FC | 1-3 | Yokohama FC | Matsumotodaira Park Stadium | 13,905 |
| 31 | 2018.09.01 | Mito HollyHock | 1-1 | Matsumoto Yamaga FC | K's denki Stadium Mito | 6,351 |
| 32 | 2018.09.08 | Avispa Fukuoka | 0-1 | Matsumoto Yamaga FC | Level5 Stadium | 9,090 |
| 33 | 2018.09.15 | Matsumoto Yamaga FC | 0-0 | Renofa Yamaguchi FC | Matsumotodaira Park Stadium | 9,490 |
| 34 | 2018.09.23 | Matsumoto Yamaga FC | 2-0 | Roasso Kumamoto | Matsumotodaira Park Stadium | 12,478 |
| 35 | 2018.09.30 | Montedio Yamagata | 3-3 | Matsumoto Yamaga FC | ND Soft Stadium Yamagata | 6,694 |
| 36 | 2018.10.06 | Matsumoto Yamaga FC | 0-0 | Ehime FC | Sunpro Alwin | 11,906 |
| 37 | 2018.10.14 | Zweigen Kanazawa | 0-2 | Matsumoto Yamaga FC | Ishikawa Athletics Stadium | 9,645 |
| 38 | 2018.10.21 | Matsumoto Yamaga FC | 0-0 | FC Gifu | Sunpro Alwin | 14,709 |
| 39 | 2018.10.28 | Oita Trinita | 1-0 | Matsumoto Yamaga FC | Oita Bank Dome | 15,125 |
| 40 | 2018.11.04 | Matsumoto Yamaga FC | 1-0 | Tokyo Verdy | Sunpro Alwin | 16,775 |
| 41 | 2018.11.11 | Tochigi SC | 0-1 | Matsumoto Yamaga FC | Tochigi Green Stadium | 11,562 |
| 42 | 2018.11.17 | Matsumoto Yamaga FC | 0-0 | Tokushima Vortis | Sunpro Alwin | 19,066 |
