= 2015 Matsumoto Yamaga FC season =

Matsumoto Yamaga FC
2015 season
- Manager: Yasuharu Sorimachi
- Stadium: Matsumotodaira Park Stadium
- J1 League: 16th

2015 Matsumoto Yamaga FC season.

== J1 League ==
=== League table ===
Pos	Team	Pld	W	D	L	GF	GA	GD	Pts	Qualification or relegation
15	Albirex Niigata	34	8	10	16	41	58	−17	34	
16	Matsumoto Yamaga (R)	34	7	7	20	30	54	−24	28	Relegation to 2016 J2 League
17	Shimizu S-Pulse (R)	34	5	10	19	37	65	−28	25	Relegation to 2016 J2 League

Updated to match(es) played on 28 November 2015. Source: Meiji Yasuda J1 League Standings
Rules for classification: 1) Points; 2) Goal difference; 3) Goals scored
(R) Relegated

=== Match details ===
J1 League match details
Match	Date	Team	Score	Team	Venue	Attendance
1-1	2015.03.07	Nagoya Grampus	3-3	Matsumoto Yamaga FC	Toyota Stadium	33,558
1-2	2015.03.14	Matsumoto Yamaga FC	1-2	Sanfrecce Hiroshima	Matsumotodaira Park Stadium	17,091
1-3	2015.03.22	Shimizu S-Pulse	0-1	Matsumoto Yamaga FC	IAI Stadium Nihondaira	19,103
1-4	2015.04.04	Urawa Reds	1-0	Matsumoto Yamaga FC	Saitama Stadium 2002	37,154
1-5	2015.04.12	Matsumoto Yamaga FC	1-3	Kashiwa Reysol	Matsumotodaira Park Stadium	18,514
1-6	2015.04.18	Montedio Yamagata	0-0	Matsumoto Yamaga FC	ND Soft Stadium Yamagata	7,067
1-7	2015.04.25	Matsumoto Yamaga FC	1-0	Vegalta Sendai	Matsumotodaira Park Stadium	13,772
1-8	2015.04.29	Gamba Osaka	1-0	Matsumoto Yamaga FC	Expo '70 Commemorative Stadium	17,173
1-9	2015.05.02	Matsumoto Yamaga FC	1-2	Albirex Niigata	Matsumotodaira Park Stadium	18,398
1-10	2015.05.06	Matsumoto Yamaga FC	2-0	Ventforet Kofu	Matsumotodaira Park Stadium	16,916
1-11	2015.05.10	Sagan Tosu	1-1	Matsumoto Yamaga FC	Best Amenity Stadium	10,648
1-12	2015.05.16	Matsumoto Yamaga FC	2-0	Vissel Kobe	Matsumotodaira Park Stadium	11,743
1-13	2015.05.23	Matsumoto Yamaga FC	0-3	Yokohama F. Marinos	Matsumotodaira Park Stadium	18,906
1-14	2015.05.30	Kashima Antlers	3-1	Matsumoto Yamaga FC	Kashima Soccer Stadium	17,155
1-15	2015.06.07	Matsumoto Yamaga FC	1-2	FC Tokyo	Matsumotodaira Park Stadium	17,617
1-16	2015.06.20	Kawasaki Frontale	2-0	Matsumoto Yamaga FC	Kawasaki Todoroki Stadium	21,490
1-17	2015.06.27	Matsumoto Yamaga FC	2-3	Shonan Bellmare	Matsumotodaira Park Stadium	15,456
2-1	2015.07.11	Matsumoto Yamaga FC	1-2	Urawa Reds	Matsumotodaira Park Stadium	18,605
2-2	2015.07.15	Sanfrecce Hiroshima	6-0	Matsumoto Yamaga FC	Edion Stadium Hiroshima	7,966
2-3	2015.07.19	Matsumoto Yamaga FC	2-0	Kashima Antlers	Matsumotodaira Park Stadium	17,625
2-4	2015.07.25	Ventforet Kofu	0-1	Matsumoto Yamaga FC	Yamanashi Chuo Bank Stadium	14,176
2-5	2015.07.29	Matsumoto Yamaga FC	1-3	Kawasaki Frontale	Matsumotodaira Park Stadium	15,610
2-6	2015.08.12	Vegalta Sendai	3-1	Matsumoto Yamaga FC	Yurtec Stadium Sendai	15,757
2-7	2015.08.16	Matsumoto Yamaga FC	0-1	Nagoya Grampus	Matsumotodaira Park Stadium	17,442
2-8	2015.08.20	Kashiwa Reysol	2-0	Matsumoto Yamaga FC	Hitachi Kashiwa Stadium	7,385
2-10	2015.09.12	Shonan Bellmare	1-1	Matsumoto Yamaga FC	Shonan BMW Stadium Hiratsuka	12,230
2-11	2015.09.20	Matsumoto Yamaga FC	1-1	Gamba Osaka	Matsumotodaira Park Stadium	18,052
2-9	2015.09.23	Matsumoto Yamaga FC	2-2	Montedio Yamagata	Matsumotodaira Park Stadium	15,412
2-12	2015.09.26	FC Tokyo	1-0	Matsumoto Yamaga FC	Ajinomoto Stadium	36,671
2-13	2015.10.03	Matsumoto Yamaga FC	1-0	Shimizu S-Pulse	Matsumotodaira Park Stadium	17,371
2-14	2015.10.17	Albirex Niigata	2-0	Matsumoto Yamaga FC	Denka Big Swan Stadium	31,324
2-15	2015.10.24	Matsumoto Yamaga FC	1-2	Sagan Tosu	Matsumotodaira Park Stadium	17,462
2-16	2015.11.07	Vissel Kobe	2-1	Matsumoto Yamaga FC	Noevir Stadium Kobe	18,092
2-17	2015.11.22	Yokohama F. Marinos	0-0	Matsumoto Yamaga FC	Nissan Stadium	44,226
