= 2014 Kyoto Sanga FC season =

Kyoto Sanga FC
2014 season
- Manager: Badu; Hitoshi Morishita; Ryoichi Kawakatsu
- Stadium: Kyoto Nishikyogoku Athletic Stadium
- J2 League: 9th
Home colours	Away colours

2014 Kyoto Sanga FC season.

== J2 League ==
Match	Date	Team	Score	Team	Venue	Attendance
1	2014.03.02	Giravanz Kitakyushu	1-3	Kyoto Sanga FC	Honjo Stadium	3,355
2	2014.03.09	Avispa Fukuoka	1-0	Kyoto Sanga FC	Level5 Stadium	5,499
3	2014.03.16	Kyoto Sanga FC	0-0	Tochigi SC	Kyoto Nishikyogoku Athletic Stadium	8,290
4	2014.03.22	Kataller Toyama	1-2	Kyoto Sanga FC	Toyama Stadium	3,761
5	2014.03.30	Kyoto Sanga FC	1-1	Consadole Sapporo	Kyoto Nishikyogoku Athletic Stadium	4,703
6	2014.04.05	Oita Trinita	0-3	Kyoto Sanga FC	Oita Bank Dome	6,108
7	2014.04.13	Kyoto Sanga FC	2-2	Montedio Yamagata	Kyoto Nishikyogoku Athletic Stadium	6,565
8	2014.04.20	Matsumoto Yamaga FC	2-2	Kyoto Sanga FC	Matsumotodaira Park Stadium	11,989
9	2014.04.26	Kyoto Sanga FC	0-0	Ehime FC	Kyoto Nishikyogoku Athletic Stadium	6,163
10	2014.04.29	Shonan Bellmare	3-0	Kyoto Sanga FC	Shonan BMW Stadium Hiratsuka	7,923
11	2014.05.03	Kyoto Sanga FC	4-1	Kamatamare Sanuki	Kyoto Nishikyogoku Athletic Stadium	7,340
12	2014.05.06	Yokohama FC	0-2	Kyoto Sanga FC	NHK Spring Mitsuzawa Football Stadium	7,153
13	2014.05.11	Kyoto Sanga FC	2-0	V-Varen Nagasaki	Kagoshima Kamoike Stadium	5,417
14	2014.05.18	Mito HollyHock	5-1	Kyoto Sanga FC	K's denki Stadium Mito	4,423
15	2014.05.24	Kyoto Sanga FC	0-3	Thespakusatsu Gunma	Kyoto Nishikyogoku Athletic Stadium	9,085
16	2014.06.01	FC Gifu	2-1	Kyoto Sanga FC	Gifu Nagaragawa Stadium	6,060
17	2014.06.07	Kyoto Sanga FC	1-0	Tokyo Verdy	Kyoto Nishikyogoku Athletic Stadium	6,942
18	2014.06.14	JEF United Chiba	3-0	Kyoto Sanga FC	Fukuda Denshi Arena	9,336
19	2014.06.21	Roasso Kumamoto	1-4	Kyoto Sanga FC	Umakana-Yokana Stadium	7,031
20	2014.06.28	Kyoto Sanga FC	1-1	Fagiano Okayama	Kyoto Nishikyogoku Athletic Stadium	12,452
21	2014.07.05	Kyoto Sanga FC	2-3	Júbilo Iwata	Kyoto Nishikyogoku Athletic Stadium	10,573
22	2014.07.20	Ehime FC	0-0	Kyoto Sanga FC	Ningineer Stadium	3,865
23	2014.07.26	Kyoto Sanga FC	3-1	Avispa Fukuoka	Kyoto Nishikyogoku Athletic Stadium	5,810
24	2014.07.30	Tokyo Verdy	1-0	Kyoto Sanga FC	Ajinomoto Field Nishigaoka	3,333
25	2014.08.03	Kyoto Sanga FC	1-1	Mito HollyHock	Kyoto Nishikyogoku Athletic Stadium	5,119
26	2014.08.10	Consadole Sapporo	0-1	Kyoto Sanga FC	Sapporo Dome	12,212
27	2014.08.17	Kyoto Sanga FC	2-2	Oita Trinita	Kyoto Nishikyogoku Athletic Stadium	5,266
28	2014.08.24	Kamatamare Sanuki	2-2	Kyoto Sanga FC	Kagawa Marugame Stadium	2,718
29	2014.08.31	Kyoto Sanga FC	1-1	Giravanz Kitakyushu	Kyoto Nishikyogoku Athletic Stadium	10,737
30	2014.09.06	Kyoto Sanga FC	3-3	JEF United Chiba	Kyoto Nishikyogoku Athletic Stadium	6,833
31	2014.09.14	Thespakusatsu Gunma	0-1	Kyoto Sanga FC	Shoda Shoyu Stadium Gunma	4,029
32	2014.09.20	Montedio Yamagata	1-0	Kyoto Sanga FC	ND Soft Stadium Yamagata	4,675
33	2014.09.23	Kyoto Sanga FC	2-2	Shonan Bellmare	Kyoto Nishikyogoku Athletic Stadium	7,976
34	2014.09.28	Kyoto Sanga FC	2-1	Yokohama FC	Kyoto Nishikyogoku Athletic Stadium	8,533
35	2014.10.04	Tochigi SC	2-1	Kyoto Sanga FC	Tochigi Green Stadium	3,155
36	2014.10.11	Kyoto Sanga FC	0-0	Roasso Kumamoto	Kyoto Nishikyogoku Athletic Stadium	5,906
37	2014.10.19	Kyoto Sanga FC	0-0	Matsumoto Yamaga FC	Kyoto Nishikyogoku Athletic Stadium	9,804
38	2014.10.26	Júbilo Iwata	2-2	Kyoto Sanga FC	Yamaha Stadium	8,218
39	2014.11.01	Fagiano Okayama	2-3	Kyoto Sanga FC	Kanko Stadium	7,032
40	2014.11.09	Kyoto Sanga FC	1-1	Kataller Toyama	Kyoto Nishikyogoku Athletic Stadium	3,680
41	2014.11.15	V-Varen Nagasaki	0-1	Kyoto Sanga FC	Nagasaki Stadium	6,341
42	2014.11.23	Kyoto Sanga FC	0-0	FC Gifu	Kyoto Nishikyogoku Athletic Stadium	10,717
