= Sunpro Alwin =

Sports venue in Matsumoto, Nagano, Japan

Coordinates: 36°10′47″N 137°55′02″E

- サンプロ・アルウィン
- Alwin
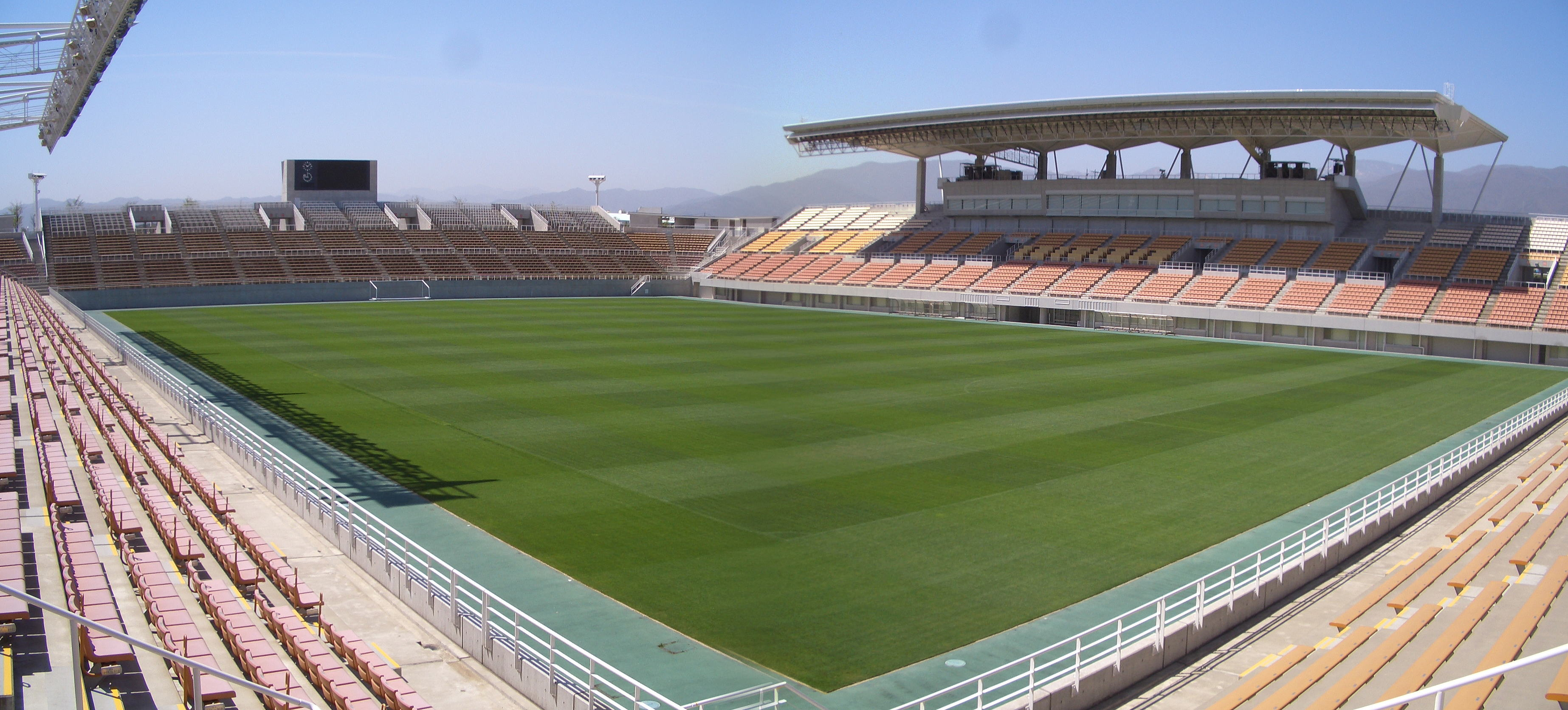
- Interior of the stadium in May 2005
- Interactive map of Sunpro Alwin
- Full name: Sunpro Alwin
- Former names: Matsumotodaira Park Stadium (2001–2018)
- Location: Matsumoto, Japan
- Owner: Nagano Prefecture
- Operator: TOY BOX
- Capacity: 20,396
- Scoreboard: Diamond Vision

Construction
- Opened: May, 2001
- Cost: JPY 6 billion

Tenant
- Matsumoto Yamaga FC

The Sunpro Alwin (サンプロ・アルウィン) is a multi-use stadium in Matsumoto, Japan. It is currently used mostly for football matches and is the home ground of Matsumoto Yamaga FC. The stadium has a capacity of 20,396 spectators. Its nickname, Alwin, is a blend of the words "Alps" (as in the Japanese Alps) and "wind".

It was formerly known as Matsumotodaira Park Stadium. Since October 2018 it has been called Sunpro Alwin for the naming rights.
