= 2006 J.League Cup final =

JEF United Chiba	Kashima Antlers
2	0
- Date: 3 November 2006
- Venue: National Stadium, Tokyo

The 2006 J.League Cup final was the 14th final of the J.League Cup competition. The final was played at National Stadium in Tokyo on 3 November 2006. JEF United Chiba won the championship.

== Match details ==
3 November 2006

JEF United Chiba	2–0	Kashima Antlers
Koki Mizuno 80'; Yuki Abe 82'	Report

National Stadium

JEF United Chiba
GK	30	(Japan) Masahiro Okamoto
DF	4	(Japan) Hiroki Mizumoto
DF	15	(Japan) Koji Nakajima
DF	3	(Japan) Daisuke Saito
MF	8	(Japan) Koki Mizuno
MF	6	(Japan) Yuki Abe
MF	7	(Japan) Yuto Sato
MF	16	(Japan) Satoru Yamagishi
MF	22	(Japan) Naotake Hanyu	(substituted off) 83'
FW	10	(Austria) Haas	(substituted off) 28'
FW	18	(Japan) Seiichiro Maki
Substitutes:
GK	1	(Japan) Tomonori Tateishi
DF	14	(Japan) Junya Tanaka
MF	2	(Japan) Masataka Sakamoto	(substituted on) 28'
MF	19	(Japan) Atsushi Ito
MF	20	(Japan) Kohei Kudo	(substituted on) 83'
MF	23	(Japan) Takashi Rakuyama
FW	11	(Japan) Yuichi Yoda
Manager:
(Bosnia and Herzegovina) Amar Osim

Kashima Antlers
GK	21	(Japan) Hitoshi Sogahata
DF	7	(Japan) Toru Araiba
DF	3	(Japan) Daiki Iwamasa
DF	4	(Japan) Go Oiwa	(substituted off) 85'
DF	18	(Brazil) Fabio Santos
MF	24	(Japan) Takeshi Aoki
MF	26	(Japan) Chikashi Masuda
MF	25	(Japan) Takuya Nozawa
MF	11	(Japan) Masaki Fukai	(substituted off) 85'
FW	13	(Japan) Atsushi Yanagisawa
FW	9	(Brazil) Alex Mineiro	(substituted off) 85'
Substitutes:
GK	1	(Japan) Hideaki Ozawa
DF	14	(Japan) Kenji Haneda
MF	22	(Japan) Masaki Chugo
MF	10	(Japan) Masashi Motoyama	(substituted on) 85'
MF	23	(Japan) Shinzo Koroki	(substituted on) 85'
MF	17	(Brazil) Da Silva
FW	19	(Japan) Yuzo Tashiro	(substituted on) 85'
Manager:
(Brazil) Paulo Autuori

== See also ==
- 2006 J.League Cup
