= Masaki Fukai =

Japanese footballer (born 1980)

Masaki Fukai 深井 正樹
Personal information
- Full name: Masaki Fukai
- Date of birth: September 13, 1980 (age 46)
- Place of birth: Fujikawa, Yamanashi, Japan
- Height: 1.61 m (5 ft 3 1/2 in)
- Position: Forward

Youth career
- 1996–1998: Nirasaki High School
- 1999–2002: Komazawa University

Senior career*
Years	Team	Apps	(Gls)
2003–2006	Kashima Antlers	92	(13)
2007	Albirex Niigata	18	(2)
2008	Nagoya Grampus	5	(0)
2008–2013	JEF United Chiba	148	(29)
2014–2015	V-Varen Nagasaki	27	(1)
2016	SC Sagamihara	28	(5)
Total		318	(50)
Medal record
Kashima Antlers
Runner-up	J.League Cup	2003
Runner-up	J.League Cup	2006
- * Club domestic league appearances and goals

Masaki Fukai (深井 正樹, Fukai Masaki; born September 13, 1980) is a former Japanese football player.

== Playing career ==
Fukai was born in Fujikawa, Yamanashi on September 13, 1980. After graduating from Komazawa University, he joined the J1 League club Kashima Antlers in 2003. He played many matches every season. The Antlers won second place in 2003 and in the 2006 J.League Cup. In 2007, he moved to Albirex Niigata. In 2008, he moved to Nagoya Grampus. However he did not play much. In August 2008, he moved to JEF United Chiba. He played many matches as forward with Seiichiro Maki who was a teammate at Komazawa University. However JEF United finished in last place in the 2009 season and was relegated to the J2 League for the first time in the club's history. Although he played often in 2012, he could not play much in 2013 due to an injury. He resigned at the end of the 2013 season. In July 2014, he joined the J2 club V-Varen Nagasaki and played two seasons. In 2016, he moved to the J3 League club SC Sagamihara and played many matches. He retired at the end of the 2016 season.

== Club statistics ==
Club	Season	League		Emperor's Cup		J.League Cup		Asia		Other^{1}		Total	
Club	Season	Apps	Goals	Apps	Goals	Apps	Goals	Apps	Goals	Apps	Goals	Apps	Goals
Kashima Antlers	2003	22	2	4	2	5	0	2	0	-		33	4
Kashima Antlers	2004	20	3	3	0	6	2	-		-		29	5
Kashima Antlers	2005	27	4	2	0	6	0	-		-		35	4
Kashima Antlers	2006	23	4	3	1	11	1	-		-		37	6
Total		92	13	12	3	28	3	2	0	-		134	19
Albirex Niigata	2007	18	2	1	0	5	1	-		-		24	3
Total		18	2	1	0	5	1	-		-		24	3
Nagoya Grampus	2008	5	0	0	0	6	0	-		-		11	0
Total		5	0	0	0	6	0	-		-		11	0
JEF United Chiba	2008	11	4	0	0	-		-		-		11	4
JEF United Chiba	2009	32	6	2	0	6	2	-		-		40	8
JEF United Chiba	2010	19	1	2	1	-		-		-		21	2
JEF United Chiba	2011	36	14	1	0	-		-		-		37	14
JEF United Chiba	2012	36	4	2	0	-		-		-		38	4
JEF United Chiba	2013	14	0	1	1	-		-		1	0	16	1
Total		148	29	8	2	6	2	-		1	0	163	33
V-Varen Nagasaki	2014	20	1	2	0	-		-		-		22	1
V-Varen Nagasaki	2015	7	0	1	1	-		-		-		8	1
Total		27	1	3	1	-		-		-		30	2
SC Sagamihara	2016	28	5	0	0	-		-		-		28	5
Total		28	5	0	0	-		-		-		28	5
Career total		318	50	24	6	45	6	2	0	1	0	390	62

^{1}Includes Promotion Playoffs to J1.
