= 2006 JEF United Chiba season =

JEF United Ichihara Chiba
2006 season
- Manager: Ivica Osim; Amar Osim
- Stadium: Fukuda Denshi Arena
- J. League 1: 11th
- Emperor's Cup: 4th Round
- J. League Cup: Champions
- Top goalscorer: Seiichiro Maki (12)

2006 JEF United Ichihara Chiba season

== Competitions ==
Competitions	Position
J. League 1	11th / 18 clubs
Emperor's Cup	4th Round
J. League Cup	Champions

== Domestic results ==
=== J. League 1 ===
Match	Date	Venue	Opponents	Score
1	2006..			-
2	2006..			-
3	2006..			-
4	2006..			-
5	2006..			-
6	2006..			-
7	2006..			-
8	2006..			-
9	2006..			-
10	2006..			-
11	2006..			-
12	2006..			-
13	2006..			-
14	2006..			-
15	2006..			-
16	2006..			-
17	2006..			-
18	2006..			-
19	2006..			-
20	2006..			-
21	2006..			-
22	2006..			-
23	2006..			-
24	2006..			-
25	2006..			-
26	2006..			-
27	2006..			-
28	2006..			-
29	2006..			-
30	2006..			-
31	2006..			-
32	2006..			-
33	2006..			-
34	2006..			-

=== Emperor's Cup ===
Match	Date	Venue	Opponents	Score
4th Round	2006..			-

=== J. League Cup ===
Match	Date	Venue	Opponents	Score
GL-C-1	2006..			-
GL-C-2	2006..			-
GL-C-3	2006..			-
GL-C-4	2006..			-
GL-C-5	2006..			-
GL-C-6	2006..			-
Quarterfinals-1	2006..			-
Quarterfinals-2	2006..			-
Semifinals-1	2006..			-
Semifinals-2	2006..			-
Final	2006..			-

== Player statistics ==
No.	Pos.	Player	D.o.B. (Age)	Height / Weight	J. League 1		Emperor's Cup		J. League Cup		Total	
No.	Pos.	Player	D.o.B. (Age)	Height / Weight	Apps	Goals	Apps	Goals	Apps	Goals	Apps	Goals
1	GK	Tomonori Tateishi	April 22, 1974 (aged 31)	cm / kg	21	0						
2	MF	Masataka Sakamoto	February 24, 1978 (aged 28)	cm / kg	34	1						
3	DF	Daisuke Saito	November 19, 1974 (aged 31)	cm / kg	28	1						
4	DF	Hiroki Mizumoto	September 12, 1985 (aged 20)	cm / kg	25	1						
5	DF	Ilian Stoyanov	January 20, 1977 (aged 29)	cm / kg	26	0						
6	MF	Yuki Abe	September 6, 1981 (aged 24)	cm / kg	33	11						
7	MF	Yūto Satō	March 12, 1982 (aged 23)	cm / kg	26	4						
8	MF	Koki Mizuno	September 6, 1985 (aged 20)	cm / kg	25	0						
9	MF	Nebojša Krupniković	August 15, 1973 (aged 32)	cm / kg	25	5						
10	FW	Mario Haas	September 16, 1974 (aged 31)	cm / kg	23	5						
11	FW	Yuichi Yoda	June 25, 1977 (aged 28)	cm / kg	13	1						
14	DF	Junya Tanaka	April 24, 1983 (aged 22)	cm / kg	0	0						
15	MF	Koji Nakajima	August 20, 1977 (aged 28)	cm / kg	26	1						
16	MF	Satoru Yamagishi	May 3, 1983 (aged 22)	cm / kg	34	6						
17	GK	Ryo Kushino	March 3, 1979 (aged 27)	cm / kg	0	0						
18	FW	Seiichiro Maki	August 7, 1980 (aged 25)	cm / kg	32	12						
19	MF	Atsushi Ito	September 24, 1983 (aged 22)	cm / kg	1	0						
20	MF	Kohei Kudo	August 28, 1984 (aged 21)	cm / kg	10	0						
21	GK	Daisuke Nakamaki	May 27, 1986 (aged 19)	cm / kg	0	0						
22	MF	Naotake Hanyu	December 22, 1979 (aged 26)	cm / kg	32	7						
23	MF	Takashi Rakuyama	August 11, 1980 (aged 25)	cm / kg	13	0						
24	DF	Kozo Yuki	January 23, 1979 (aged 27)	cm / kg	9	1						
25	FW	Hibiki Kato	November 14, 1987 (aged 18)	cm / kg	0	0						
26	DF	Yoshiaki Fujita	January 12, 1983 (aged 23)	cm / kg	0	0						
27	FW	Tomoya Kumagai	March 25, 1988 (aged 17)	cm / kg	0	0						
28	FW	Kyohei Horikawa	September 18, 1986 (aged 19)	cm / kg	0	0						
29	FW	Kota Aoki	April 27, 1987 (aged 18)	cm / kg	3	1						
30	GK	Masahiro Okamoto	May 17, 1983 (aged 22)	cm / kg	13	0						
31	DF	Mitsuki Ichihara	January 31, 1986 (aged 20)	cm / kg	0	0						
32	FW	Kim Dong-Soo	September 8, 1986 (aged 19)	cm / kg	0	0						
33	FW	Yusuke Kawabuchi	April 21, 1986 (aged 19)	cm / kg	0	0						
34	MF	Kosuke Nakahara	March 17, 1987 (aged 18)	cm / kg	0	0						
35	MF	Koji Asato	October 14, 1987 (aged 18)	cm / kg	0	0						
36	MF	Tadashi Takeda	July 27, 1986 (aged 19)	cm / kg	0	0						
37	MF	Taisuke Matsugae	December 15, 1982 (aged 23)	cm / kg	0	0						
38	DF	Norihiro Kawakami	April 4, 1987 (aged 18)	cm / kg	0	0						
39	MF	Ken Matsumoto	August 28, 1987 (aged 18)	cm / kg	0	0						
40	GK	Takaya Kurokawa	April 7, 1981 (aged 24)	cm / kg	0	0						

== Other pages ==
- (in Japanese) J. League official site
