= 2005 J.League Cup final =

JEF United Chiba	Gamba Osaka
0	0
- JEF United Chiba won 5–4 on penalties
- Date: 5 November 2005
- Venue: National Stadium, Tokyo

2005 J.League Cup final was the 13th final of the J.League Cup competition. The final was played at National Stadium in Tokyo on 5 November 2005. JEF United Chiba won the championship.

== Match details ==
5 November 2005

JEF United Chiba	0–0	Gamba Osaka
	Report
Penalties
	5–4

National Stadium

JEF United Chiba
GK	1	(Japan) Tomonori Tateishi
DF	24	(Japan) Kozo Yuki
DF	5	(Bulgaria) Stoyanov
DF	3	(Japan) Daisuke Saito
MF	16	(Japan) Satoru Yamagishi	(substituted off) 64'
MF	6	(Japan) Yuki Abe
MF	7	(Japan) Yuto Sato
MF	2	(Japan) Masataka Sakamoto
MF	22	(Japan) Naotake Hanyu	(substituted off) 45'
MF	8	(Romania) Popescu	(substituted off) 72'
FW	18	(Japan) Seiichiro Maki
Substitutes:
GK	17	(Japan) Ryo Kushino
DF	27	(Japan) Hiroki Mizumoto
MF	20	(Japan) Kohei Kudo	(substituted on) 45'
MF	29	(Japan) Koki Mizuno	(substituted on) 64'
FW	9	(Japan) Takenori Hayashi	(substituted on) 72'
Manager:
(Bosnia and Herzegovina) Ivica Osim

Gamba Osaka
GK	22	(Japan) Yosuke Fujigaya
DF	4	(Japan) Noritada Saneyoshi
DF	2	(Brazil) Sidiclei
DF	6	(Japan) Satoshi Yamaguchi
MF	24	(Japan) Toshihiro Matsushita	(substituted off) 67'
MF	27	(Japan) Hideo Hashimoto	(substituted off) 109'
MF	7	(Japan) Yasuhito Endo
MF	10	(Japan) Takahiro Futagawa	(substituted off) 89'
MF	8	(Brazil) Fernandinho
FW	16	(Japan) Masashi Oguro
FW	9	(Brazil) Araujo
Substitutes:
GK	1	(Japan) Naoki Matsuyo
DF	3	(Japan) Toru Irie	(substituted on) 67'
DF	5	(Japan) Tsuneyasu Miyamoto	(substituted on) 89'
FW	11	(Japan) Masanobu Matsunami
FW	18	(Japan) Kota Yoshihara	(substituted on) 109'
Manager:
(Japan) Akira Nishino

== See also ==
- 2005 J.League Cup
