= 2013 Avispa Fukuoka season =

Avispa Fukuoka
2013 season
- Manager: Marijan Pušnik
- Stadium: Level5 Stadium
- J2 League: 14th

2013 Avispa Fukuoka season.

== J2 League ==
Match	Date	Team	Score	Team	Venue	Attendance
1	2013.03.03	Tokyo Verdy	0-1	Avispa Fukuoka	Ajinomoto Stadium	10,447
2	2013.03.10	Avispa Fukuoka	2-1	Montedio Yamagata	Level5 Stadium	7,204
3	2013.03.17	Avispa Fukuoka	1-2	Kyoto Sanga FC	Level5 Stadium	4,614
4	2013.03.20	Tokushima Vortis	2-1	Avispa Fukuoka	Pocarisweat Stadium	2,921
5	2013.03.24	Avispa Fukuoka	0-1	Consadole Sapporo	Level5 Stadium	5,188
6	2013.03.31	Avispa Fukuoka	1-1	Mito HollyHock	Level5 Stadium	4,104
7	2013.04.07	Gainare Tottori	0-0	Avispa Fukuoka	Tottori Bank Bird Stadium	1,530
8	2013.04.14	Avispa Fukuoka	2-1	Giravanz Kitakyushu	Level5 Stadium	5,936
9	2013.04.17	Thespakusatsu Gunma	0-1	Avispa Fukuoka	Shoda Shoyu Stadium Gunma	1,472
10	2013.04.21	JEF United Chiba	1-1	Avispa Fukuoka	Fukuda Denshi Arena	6,511
11	2013.04.28	Avispa Fukuoka	0-1	Matsumoto Yamaga FC	Level5 Stadium	4,507
12	2013.05.03	Avispa Fukuoka	0-0	Vissel Kobe	Level5 Stadium	5,710
13	2013.05.06	Yokohama FC	0-1	Avispa Fukuoka	NHK Spring Mitsuzawa Football Stadium	6,387
14	2013.05.12	Avispa Fukuoka	2-3	Gamba Osaka	Level5 Stadium	14,526
15	2013.05.19	Kataller Toyama	1-2	Avispa Fukuoka	Toyama Stadium	3,107
16	2013.05.26	Avispa Fukuoka	2-1	FC Gifu	Level5 Stadium	3,471
17	2013.06.01	Avispa Fukuoka	1-1	Roasso Kumamoto	Level5 Stadium	7,253
18	2013.06.08	Tochigi SC	2-0	Avispa Fukuoka	Tochigi Green Stadium	3,429
19	2013.06.15	Fagiano Okayama	1-1	Avispa Fukuoka	Kanko Stadium	8,123
20	2013.06.22	Avispa Fukuoka	2-0	Ehime FC	Level5 Stadium	5,318
21	2013.06.29	V-Varen Nagasaki	0-0	Avispa Fukuoka	Nagasaki Stadium	6,971
22	2013.07.03	Avispa Fukuoka	1-0	Thespakusatsu Gunma	Level5 Stadium	2,640
23	2013.07.07	Consadole Sapporo	3-0	Avispa Fukuoka	Sapporo Atsubetsu Stadium	6,257
24	2013.07.14	Avispa Fukuoka	2-0	Tochigi SC	Level5 Stadium	4,892
25	2013.07.20	FC Gifu	0-2	Avispa Fukuoka	Gifu Nagaragawa Stadium	5,857
26	2013.07.27	Kyoto Sanga FC	2-1	Avispa Fukuoka	Kyoto Nishikyogoku Athletic Stadium	7,885
27	2013.08.04	Avispa Fukuoka	2-3	Tokyo Verdy	Level5 Stadium	5,218
28	2013.08.11	Gamba Osaka	1-0	Avispa Fukuoka	Expo '70 Commemorative Stadium	13,440
29	2013.08.18	Avispa Fukuoka	2-1	V-Varen Nagasaki	Level5 Stadium	6,090
30	2013.08.21	Mito HollyHock	0-0	Avispa Fukuoka	K's denki Stadium Mito	2,826
31	2013.08.25	Vissel Kobe	4-0	Avispa Fukuoka	Kobe Universiade Memorial Stadium	10,802
32	2013.09.01	Avispa Fukuoka	3-4	JEF United Chiba	Level5 Stadium	4,552
33	2013.09.15	Avispa Fukuoka	1-5	Yokohama FC	Level5 Stadium	6,288
34	2013.09.22	Montedio Yamagata	2-1	Avispa Fukuoka	ND Soft Stadium Yamagata	6,147
35	2013.09.29	Avispa Fukuoka	1-4	Kataller Toyama	Level5 Stadium	3,968
36	2013.10.06	Giravanz Kitakyushu	0-2	Avispa Fukuoka	Honjo Stadium	7,058
37	2013.10.20	Avispa Fukuoka	1-1	Gainare Tottori	Level5 Stadium	4,933
38	2013.10.27	Matsumoto Yamaga FC	2-1	Avispa Fukuoka	Matsumotodaira Park Stadium	9,754
39	2013.11.03	Avispa Fukuoka	1-0	Tokushima Vortis	Level5 Stadium	4,253
40	2013.11.10	Roasso Kumamoto	1-1	Avispa Fukuoka	Umakana-Yokana Stadium	6,561
41	2013.11.17	Ehime FC	2-2	Avispa Fukuoka	Ningineer Stadium	4,129
42	2013.11.24	Avispa Fukuoka	2-0	Fagiano Okayama	Level5 Stadium	9,605
