= 2016 JEF United Chiba season =

JEF United Chiba
2016 season
- Manager: Takashi Sekizuka; Shigetoshi Hasebe
- Stadium: Fukuda Denshi Arena
- J2 League: 11th

2016 JEF United Chiba season.

== J2 League ==
=== League table ===
Pos	Team	Pld	W	D	L	GF	GA	GD	Pts
10	Ehime FC	42	12	20	10	41	40	+1	56
11	JEF United Chiba	42	13	14	15	52	53	−1	53
12	Renofa Yamaguchi	42	14	11	17	55	63	−8	53

Updated to match(es) played on 20 November 2016. Source: 2016 MEIJI YASUDA J2 LEAGUE League table
Rules for classification: 1) Points; 2) Goal difference; 3) Goals scored

=== Match details ===
J2 League match details
Match	Date	Team	Score	Team	Venue	Attendance
1	2016.02.28	JEF United Chiba	2-1	Tokushima Vortis	Fukuda Denshi Arena	12,063
2	2016.03.06	Fagiano Okayama	2-1	JEF United Chiba	City Light Stadium	9,288
3	2016.03.13	JEF United Chiba	1-0	Yokohama FC	Fukuda Denshi Arena	9,419
4	2016.03.20	Matsumoto Yamaga FC	0-1	JEF United Chiba	Matsumotodaira Park Stadium	17,284
5	2016.03.26	JEF United Chiba	0-0	Thespakusatsu Gunma	Fukuda Denshi Arena	8,555
6	2016.04.03	Cerezo Osaka	2-1	JEF United Chiba	Kincho Stadium	10,719
7	2016.04.09	JEF United Chiba	1-0	Zweigen Kanazawa	Fukuda Denshi Arena	9,280
8	2016.04.17	JEF United Chiba	1-1	FC Machida Zelvia	Fukuda Denshi Arena	7,986
9	2016.04.23	Renofa Yamaguchi FC	4-2	JEF United Chiba	Ishin Memorial Park Stadium	5,159
10	2016.04.29	Mito HollyHock	1-0	JEF United Chiba	K's denki Stadium Mito	6,042
11	2016.05.03	JEF United Chiba	1-1	Kamatamare Sanuki	Fukuda Denshi Arena	11,439
12	2016.05.07	Kyoto Sanga FC	1-1	JEF United Chiba	Kyoto Nishikyogoku Athletic Stadium	5,529
13	2016.05.15	JEF United Chiba	2-0	Roasso Kumamoto	Fukuda Denshi Arena	14,163
14	2016.05.22	JEF United Chiba	3-2	FC Gifu	Fukuda Denshi Arena	10,147
15	2016.05.28	V-Varen Nagasaki	1-1	JEF United Chiba	Nagasaki Stadium	4,826
16	2016.06.04	Hokkaido Consadole Sapporo	2-2	JEF United Chiba	Sapporo Dome	11,937
17	2016.06.08	JEF United Chiba	3-0	Montedio Yamagata	Fukuda Denshi Arena	7,684
18	2016.06.12	JEF United Chiba	2-2	Tokyo Verdy	Fukuda Denshi Arena	11,196
19	2016.06.19	Shimizu S-Pulse	1-1	JEF United Chiba	IAI Stadium Nihondaira	8,730
20	2016.06.26	JEF United Chiba	1-2	Giravanz Kitakyushu	Fukuda Denshi Arena	10,344
21	2016.07.03	Ehime FC	2-1	JEF United Chiba	Ningineer Stadium	2,829
22	2016.07.10	JEF United Chiba	0-1	Mito HollyHock	Fukuda Denshi Arena	9,132
23	2016.07.16	FC Machida Zelvia	2-3	JEF United Chiba	Machida Stadium	6,412
24	2016.07.20	Montedio Yamagata	1-1	JEF United Chiba	ND Soft Stadium Yamagata	4,410
25	2016.07.24	JEF United Chiba	3-4	Shimizu S-Pulse	Fukuda Denshi Arena	12,400
26	2016.07.31	Yokohama FC	2-1	JEF United Chiba	NHK Spring Mitsuzawa Football Stadium	7,396
27	2016.08.07	JEF United Chiba	0-0	Ehime FC	Fukuda Denshi Arena	8,295
28	2016.08.11	Giravanz Kitakyushu	0-2	JEF United Chiba	Honjo Stadium	3,981
29	2016.08.14	Roasso Kumamoto	3-0	JEF United Chiba	Umakana-Yokana Stadium	4,538
30	2016.08.21	JEF United Chiba	2-0	Fagiano Okayama	Fukuda Denshi Arena	10,109
31	2016.09.11	FC Gifu	0-2	JEF United Chiba	Gifu Nagaragawa Stadium	7,562
32	2016.09.18	JEF United Chiba	1-1	Renofa Yamaguchi FC	Fukuda Denshi Arena	10,036
33	2016.09.25	Tokyo Verdy	1-1	JEF United Chiba	Ajinomoto Stadium	6,121
34	2016.10.02	Thespakusatsu Gunma	2-1	JEF United Chiba	Shoda Shoyu Stadium Gunma	6,956
35	2016.10.08	JEF United Chiba	0-3	Kyoto Sanga FC	Fukuda Denshi Arena	8,385
36	2016.10.16	JEF United Chiba	0-3	Matsumoto Yamaga FC	Fukuda Denshi Arena	12,732
37	2016.10.23	Tokushima Vortis	1-0	JEF United Chiba	Pocarisweat Stadium	3,946
38	2016.10.30	JEF United Chiba	0-0	V-Varen Nagasaki	Fukuda Denshi Arena	9,088
39	2016.11.03	JEF United Chiba	3-0	Cerezo Osaka	Fukuda Denshi Arena	10,948
40	2016.11.06	Zweigen Kanazawa	1-2	JEF United Chiba	Ishikawa Athletics Stadium	6,352
41	2016.11.12	JEF United Chiba	1-2	Hokkaido Consadole Sapporo	Fukuda Denshi Arena	12,726
42	2016.11.20	Kamatamare Sanuki	1-1	JEF United Chiba	Pikara Stadium	4,461
