= 2010 JEF United Chiba season =

JEF United Ichihara Chiba
2010 season
- Manager: Atsuhiko Ejiri
- Stadium: Fukuda Denshi Arena
- J. League 2: 4th
- Emperor's Cup: 4th Round
- Top goalscorer: Neto Baiano (10)

2010 JEF United Chiba season

== Competitions ==
Competitions	Position
J. League 2	4th / 19 clubs
Emperor's Cup	4th Round

== Player statistics ==
No.	Pos.	Player	D.o.B. (Age)	Height / Weight	J. League 2		Emperor's Cup		Total	
No.	Pos.	Player	D.o.B. (Age)	Height / Weight	Apps	Goals	Apps	Goals	Apps	Goals
1	GK	Masahiro Okamoto	May 17, 1983 (aged 26)	cm / kg	14	0				
2	MF	Masataka Sakamoto	February 24, 1978 (aged 32)	cm / kg	21	0				
3	DF	Alex	April 16, 1983 (aged 26)	cm / kg	33	7				
4	DF	Shohei Ikeda	April 27, 1981 (aged 28)	cm / kg	0	0				
5	DF	Mark Milligan	August 4, 1985 (aged 24)	cm / kg	15	0				
6	MF	Kei Yamaguchi	June 11, 1983 (aged 26)	cm / kg	27	1				
7	MF	Yūto Satō	March 12, 1982 (aged 27)	cm / kg	36	5				
8	MF	Masaki Chugo	May 16, 1982 (aged 27)	cm / kg	8	0				
9	FW	Masaki Fukai	September 13, 1980 (aged 29)	cm / kg	19	1				
10	MF	Kohei Kudo	August 28, 1984 (aged 25)	cm / kg	35	2				
11	FW	Takenori Hayashi	October 14, 1980 (aged 29)	cm / kg	7	0				
13	DF	Takumi Wada	October 20, 1981 (aged 28)	cm / kg	8	0				
14	MF	Shu Kurata	November 26, 1988 (aged 21)	cm / kg	29	8				
15	DF	Yohei Fukumoto	April 12, 1987 (aged 22)	cm / kg	19	0				
16	MF	Tatsuya Yazawa	October 3, 1984 (aged 25)	cm / kg	28	5				
17	GK	Ryo Kushino	March 3, 1979 (aged 31)	cm / kg	22	0				
18	FW	Seiichiro Maki	August 7, 1980 (aged 29)	cm / kg	13	0				
19	MF	Shinji Murai	December 1, 1979 (aged 30)	cm / kg	4	1				
20	FW	Neto Baiano	September 17, 1982 (aged 27)	cm / kg	29	10				
21	GK	Daisuke Nakamaki	May 27, 1986 (aged 23)	cm / kg	0	0				
22	MF	Koki Yonekura	May 17, 1988 (aged 21)	cm / kg	12	5				
23	MF	Tsukasa Masuyama	January 25, 1990 (aged 20)	cm / kg	1	0				
24	MF	Keisuke Ota	July 23, 1981 (aged 28)	cm / kg	18	0				
25	DF	Shoma Kamata	June 15, 1989 (aged 20)	cm / kg	15	0				
26	FW	Ryo Kanazawa	October 19, 1988 (aged 21)	cm / kg	0	0				
27	DF	Keiji Watanabe	January 28, 1985 (aged 25)	cm / kg	8	0				
28	MF	Daisuke Ito	April 18, 1987 (aged 22)	cm / kg	11	0				
29	FW	Kota Aoki	April 27, 1987 (aged 22)	cm / kg	23	6				
30	GK	Shinnosuke Sato	May 9, 1991 (aged 18)	cm / kg	0	0				
31	DF	Ryota Aoki	August 19, 1984 (aged 25)	cm / kg	23	2				
32	FW	Akira Toshima	October 4, 1991 (aged 18)	cm / kg	0	0				
33	DF	Takayuki Chano	November 23, 1976 (aged 33)	cm / kg	24	2				
34	FW	Yuichi Kubo	September 26, 1988 (aged 21)	cm / kg	1	0				

== Other pages ==
- (in Japanese) J. League official site
