= Ryo Kushino =

Japanese footballer (born 1979)

Ryo Kushino 櫛野 亮
Personal information
- Full name: Ryo Kushino
- Date of birth: March 3, 1979 (age 47)
- Place of birth: Kumamoto, Japan
- Height: 1.85 m (6 ft 1 in)
- Position: Goalkeeper

Youth career
- 1994–1996: Ozu High School

Senior career*
| Years | Team | Apps | (Gls) |
| 1997–2013 | JEF United Chiba | 182 | (0) |
| 2007 | →Nagoya Grampus Eight (loan) | 6 | (0) |
| Total | | 188 | (0) |
Medal record
JEF United Chiba
| Winner | J.League Cup | 2005 |
| Winner | J.League Cup | 2006 |
| Runner-up | J.League Cup | 1998 |
Representing Japan
AFC U-19 Championship
| Silver medal – second place | 1998 Thailand |
- * Club domestic league appearances and goals

Ryo Kushino (櫛野 亮, Kushino Ryo; born March 3, 1979) is a former Japanese football player.

== Playing career ==
Kushino was born in Kumamoto on March 3, 1979. After graduating from high school, he joined the J1 League club JEF United Ichihara (later JEF United Chiba) in 1997. However he did not play in any matches, as all play time was assigned to Japan national team goalkeeper Kenichi Shimokawa until 1999. From 2000, he became a regular goalkeeper. However he was injured in August 2005 and he lost his regular position to Tomonori Tateishi. Although he did not play much in any league competition, he played in many matches in the J.League Cup and the club won the championships in 2005 and 2006 J.League Cup. In 2007, he moved to Nagoya Grampus Eight on loan. However he did not play much, as he was second to Japan national team goalkeeper Seigo Narazaki. In 2008, he returned to JEF United. However he was second string to the young goalkeeper Masahiro Okamoto and the club was relegated to the J2 League in 2010. He played often as a regular goalkeeper in 2010, but did not play much in 2011. He retired at the end of the 2013 season.

== Career statistics ==
Appearances and goals by club, season and competition
| Club | Season | League | | | Emperor's Cup | | J.League Cup | | Total | |
| Club | Season | Division | Apps | Goals | Apps | Goals | Apps | Goals | Apps | Goals |
|---|---|---|---|---|---|---|---|---|---|---|
| JEF United Ichihara | 1997 | J1 League | 0 | 0 | 0 | 0 | 0 | 0 | 0 | 0 |
| JEF United Ichihara | 1998 | J1 League | 0 | 0 | 0 | 0 | 0 | 0 | 0 | 0 |
| JEF United Ichihara | 1999 | J1 League | 0 | 0 | 0 | 0 | 0 | 0 | 0 | 0 |
| JEF United Ichihara | 2000 | J1 League | 14 | 0 | 3 | 0 | 1 | 0 | 18 | 0 |
| JEF United Ichihara | 2001 | J1 League | 21 | 0 | 0 | 0 | 6 | 0 | 27 | 0 |
| JEF United Ichihara | 2002 | J1 League | 23 | 0 | 3 | 0 | 5 | 0 | 31 | 0 |
| JEF United Ichihara | 2003 | J1 League | 30 | 0 | 3 | 0 | 3 | 0 | 36 | 0 |
| JEF United Ichihara | 2004 | J1 League | 29 | 0 | 1 | 0 | 6 | 0 | 36 | 0 |
| JEF United Chiba | 2005 | J1 League | 22 | 0 | 1 | 0 | 5 | 0 | 28 | 0 |
| JEF United Chiba | 2006 | J1 League | 0 | 0 | 0 | 0 | 8 | 0 | 8 | 0 |
| Nagoya Grampus Eight | 2007 | J1 League | 6 | 0 | 0 | 0 | 0 | 0 | 6 | 0 |
| JEF United Chiba | 2008 | J1 League | 1 | 0 | 1 | 0 | 0 | 0 | 2 | 0 |
| JEF United Chiba | 2009 | J1 League | 11 | 0 | 0 | 0 | 2 | 0 | 13 | 0 |
| JEF United Chiba | 2010 | J2 League | 22 | 0 | 1 | 0 | — | | 23 | 0 |
| JEF United Chiba | 2011 | J2 League | 0 | 0 | 0 | 0 | — | | 0 | 0 |
| JEF United Chiba | 2012 | J2 League | 9 | 0 | 0 | 0 | — | | 9 | 0 |
| JEF United Chiba | 2013 | J2 League | 0 | 0 | 0 | 0 | — | | 0 | 0 |
| Career total | | | 188 | 0 | 13 | 0 | 36 | 0 | 237 | 0 |
