= 2017 V-Varen Nagasaki season =

V-Varen Nagasaki
2017 season
- Manager: Takuya Takagi
- Stadium: Transcosmos Stadium Nagasaki
- J2 League: 2nd

2017 V-Varen Nagasaki season.

== J2 League ==
=== League table ===
Pos	Team	Pld	W	D	L	GF	GA	GD	Pts	Promotion, qualification or relegation
1	Shonan Bellmare (C, P)	42	24	11	7	58	36	+22	83	Promotion to 2018 J1 League
2	V-Varen Nagasaki (P)	42	24	8	10	59	41	+18	80	Promotion to 2018 J1 League
3	Nagoya Grampus (O, P)	42	23	6	13	85	65	+20	75	Qualification for promotion playoffs (Note: Only teams that meet J1 license criteria can participate in promotion playoffs. If one or more teams fail to meet the criteria, only eligible teams that finished 3rd to 6th will participate and no replacement teams will be added.)

Updated to match(es) played on 28 November 2017. Source: 2017 MEIJI YASUDA J2 LEAGUE League table
Rules for classification: 1) Points; 2) Goal difference; 3) Goals scored
(C) Champions; (O) Play-off winners; (P) Promoted

=== Match details ===
J2 League match details
Match	Date	Team	Score	Team	Venue	Attendance
1	2017.02.26	V-Varen Nagasaki	4-0	Thespakusatsu Gunma	Transcosmos Stadium Nagasaki	4,394
2	2017.03.05	V-Varen Nagasaki	1-1	Yokohama FC	Transcosmos Stadium Nagasaki	5,551
3	2017.03.12	Tokushima Vortis	3-1	V-Varen Nagasaki	Pocarisweat Stadium	4,777
4	2017.03.18	V-Varen Nagasaki	2-1	Zweigen Kanazawa	Transcosmos Stadium Nagasaki	3,193
5	2017.03.25	Kyoto Sanga FC	0-1	V-Varen Nagasaki	Kyoto Nishikyogoku Athletic Stadium	5,854
6	2017.04.02	V-Varen Nagasaki	2-0	Montedio Yamagata	Transcosmos Stadium Nagasaki	3,718
7	2017.04.08	Matsumoto Yamaga FC	3-0	V-Varen Nagasaki	Matsumotodaira Park Stadium	11,215
8	2017.04.15	V-Varen Nagasaki	0-1	Avispa Fukuoka	Transcosmos Stadium Nagasaki	5,340
9	2017.04.22	Ehime FC	1-0	V-Varen Nagasaki	Ningineer Stadium	2,280
10	2017.04.29	Renofa Yamaguchi FC	0-3	V-Varen Nagasaki	Ishin Memorial Park Stadium	5,503
11	2017.05.03	V-Varen Nagasaki	3-0	Fagiano Okayama	Transcosmos Stadium Nagasaki	4,511
12	2017.05.07	V-Varen Nagasaki	0-0	Mito HollyHock	Transcosmos Stadium Nagasaki	4,428
13	2017.05.13	JEF United Chiba	5-0	V-Varen Nagasaki	Fukuda Denshi Arena	6,230
14	2017.05.17	V-Varen Nagasaki	2-1	Oita Trinita	Transcosmos Stadium Nagasaki	3,307
15	2017.05.21	FC Gifu	4-4	V-Varen Nagasaki	Gifu Nagaragawa Stadium	4,475
16	2017.05.27	V-Varen Nagasaki	1-0	Tokyo Verdy	Transcosmos Stadium Nagasaki	4,478
17	2017.06.03	Shonan Bellmare	1-1	V-Varen Nagasaki	Shonan BMW Stadium Hiratsuka	7,670
18	2017.06.11	V-Varen Nagasaki	1-0	Roasso Kumamoto	Transcosmos Stadium Nagasaki	4,618
19	2017.06.17	V-Varen Nagasaki	0-0	FC Machida Zelvia	Transcosmos Stadium Nagasaki	5,687
20	2017.06.25	Nagoya Grampus	2-0	V-Varen Nagasaki	Paloma Mizuho Stadium	10,175
21	2017.07.01	Kamatamare Sanuki	0-1	V-Varen Nagasaki	Pikara Stadium	2,994
22	2017.07.09	V-Varen Nagasaki	2-0	Ehime FC	Transcosmos Stadium Nagasaki	3,189
23	2017.07.15	V-Varen Nagasaki	1-0	Matsumoto Yamaga FC	Transcosmos Stadium Nagasaki	5,662
24	2017.07.22	Yokohama FC	2-1	V-Varen Nagasaki	NHK Spring Mitsuzawa Football Stadium	4,523
25	2017.07.30	Fagiano Okayama	2-0	V-Varen Nagasaki	City Light Stadium	10,938
26	2017.08.05	V-Varen Nagasaki	2-1	FC Gifu	Transcosmos Stadium Nagasaki	4,355
27	2017.08.11	V-Varen Nagasaki	0-2	Shonan Bellmare	Transcosmos Stadium Nagasaki	6,072
28	2017.08.16	Avispa Fukuoka	0-1	V-Varen Nagasaki	Level5 Stadium	13,481
29	2017.08.20	Tokyo Verdy	2-1	V-Varen Nagasaki	Ajinomoto Stadium	5,025
30	2017.08.27	V-Varen Nagasaki	1-0	Kyoto Sanga FC	Transcosmos Stadium Nagasaki	5,032
31	2017.09.02	Zweigen Kanazawa	1-2	V-Varen Nagasaki	Ishikawa Athletics Stadium	3,000
32	2017.09.10	V-Varen Nagasaki	2-1	Tokushima Vortis	Transcosmos Stadium Nagasaki	4,744
33	2017.09.16	Oita Trinita	1-2	V-Varen Nagasaki	Oita Bank Dome	6,265
34	2017.09.24	V-Varen Nagasaki	2-1	JEF United Chiba	Transcosmos Stadium Nagasaki	5,602
35	2017.09.30	Montedio Yamagata	0-0	V-Varen Nagasaki	ND Soft Stadium Yamagata	4,785
36	2017.10.07	FC Machida Zelvia	1-1	V-Varen Nagasaki	Machida Stadium	3,131
37	2017.10.15	V-Varen Nagasaki	2-1	Renofa Yamaguchi FC	Transcosmos Stadium Nagasaki	5,545
38	2017.10.21	V-Varen Nagasaki	1-1	Nagoya Grampus	Transcosmos Stadium Nagasaki	12,923
39	2017.10.28	Roasso Kumamoto	0-2	V-Varen Nagasaki	Egao Kenko Stadium	7,635
40	2017.11.05	Mito HollyHock	0-2	V-Varen Nagasaki	K's denki Stadium Mito	4,867
41	2017.11.11	V-Varen Nagasaki	3-1	Kamatamare Sanuki	Transcosmos Stadium Nagasaki	22,407
42	2017.11.19	Thespakusatsu Gunma	1-4	V-Varen Nagasaki	Shoda Shoyu Stadium Gunma	5,712
