= 2009 JEF United Chiba season =

JEF United Ichihara Chiba
2009 season
- Manager: Alex Miller; Atsuhiko Ejiri
- Stadium: Fukuda Denshi Arena
- J. League 1: 18th
- Emperor's Cup: 4th Round
- J. League Cup: GL-B 4th
- Top goalscorer: Masaki Fukai (6)

2009 JEF United Ichihara Chiba season

== Competitions ==
Competitions	Position
J. League 1	18th / 18 clubs
Emperor's Cup	4th Round
J. League Cup	GL-B 4th / 7 clubs

== Player statistics ==
No.	Pos.	Player	D.o.B. (Age)	Height / Weight	J. League 1		Emperor's Cup		J. League Cup		Total	
No.	Pos.	Player	D.o.B. (Age)	Height / Weight	Apps	Goals	Apps	Goals	Apps	Goals	Apps	Goals
1	GK	Masahiro Okamoto	May 17, 1983 (aged 25)	cm / kg	23	0						
2	MF	Masataka Sakamoto	February 24, 1978 (aged 31)	cm / kg	33	1						
3	DF	Daisuke Saito	November 19, 1974 (aged 34)	cm / kg	14	2						
4	DF	Eddy Bosnar	April 29, 1980 (aged 28)	cm / kg	25	1						
5	DF	Alex	April 16, 1983 (aged 25)	cm / kg	22	0						
6	MF	Tomi Shimomura	December 18, 1980 (aged 28)	cm / kg	25	1						
7	FW	Neto Baiano	September 17, 1982 (aged 26)	cm / kg	14	4						
8	MF	Masaki Chugo	May 16, 1982 (aged 26)	cm / kg	19	0						
9	FW	Masaki Fukai	September 13, 1980 (aged 28)	cm / kg	32	6						
10	MF	Kohei Kudo	August 28, 1984 (aged 24)	cm / kg	32	3						
11	FW	Tatsunori Arai	December 22, 1983 (aged 25)	cm / kg	24	2						
13	DF	Takumi Wada	October 20, 1981 (aged 27)	cm / kg	19	1						
14	DF	Shohei Ikeda	April 27, 1981 (aged 27)	cm / kg	19	0						
15	DF	Yohei Fukumoto	April 12, 1987 (aged 21)	cm / kg	17	0						
16	MF	Tatsuya Yazawa	October 3, 1984 (aged 24)	cm / kg	32	3						
17	GK	Ryo Kushino	March 3, 1979 (aged 30)	cm / kg	11	0						
18	FW	Seiichiro Maki	August 7, 1980 (aged 28)	cm / kg	31	5						
19	MF	Michael	January 21, 1982 (aged 27)	cm / kg	12	2						
20	MF	Naoya Saeki	December 18, 1977 (aged 31)	cm / kg	1	0						
21	GK	Daisuke Nakamaki	May 27, 1986 (aged 22)	cm / kg	0	0						
22	MF	Koki Yonekura	May 17, 1988 (aged 20)	cm / kg	16	0						
23	MF	Tsukasa Masuyama	January 25, 1990 (aged 19)	cm / kg	5	0						
24	MF	Keisuke Ota	July 23, 1981 (aged 27)	cm / kg	11	0						
26	FW	Ryo Kanazawa	October 19, 1988 (aged 20)	cm / kg	2	0						
29	FW	Kota Aoki	April 27, 1987 (aged 21)	cm / kg	0	0						
30	GK	Torashi Shimazu	August 20, 1978 (aged 30)	cm / kg	0	0						
31	DF	Ryota Aoki	August 19, 1984 (aged 24)	cm / kg	26	0						

== Other pages ==
- (in Japanese) J. League official site
