= 2005 JEF United Chiba season =

JEF United Ichihara Chiba
2005 season
- Manager: Ivica Osim
- Stadium: Ichihara Seaside Stadium
- J. League 1: 4th
- Emperor's Cup: 5th Round
- J. League Cup: Champions
- Top goalscorer: Yuki Abe (12); Seiichiro Maki (12)

During the 2005 season, JEF United Ichihara Chiba competed in the J. League 1, the top tier of Japanese football, in which they finished 4th.

== Competitions ==
Competitions	Position
J. League 1	4th / 18 clubs
Emperor's Cup	5th Round
J. League Cup	Champions

== Domestic results ==
=== J. League 1 ===
Match	Date	Venue	Opponents	Score
1	2005..	[[]]	[[]]	-
2	2005..	[[]]	[[]]	-
3	2005..	[[]]	[[]]	-
4	2005..	[[]]	[[]]	-
5	2005..	[[]]	[[]]	-
6	2005..	[[]]	[[]]	-
7	2005..	[[]]	[[]]	-
8	2005..	[[]]	[[]]	-
9	2005..	[[]]	[[]]	-
10	2005..	[[]]	[[]]	-
11	2005..	[[]]	[[]]	-
12	2005..	[[]]	[[]]	-
13	2005..	[[]]	[[]]	-
14	2005..	[[]]	[[]]	-
15	2005..	[[]]	[[]]	-
16	2005..	[[]]	[[]]	-
17	2005..	[[]]	[[]]	-
18	2005..	[[]]	[[]]	-
19	2005..	[[]]	[[]]	-
20	2005..	[[]]	[[]]	-
21	2005..	[[]]	[[]]	-
22	2005..	[[]]	[[]]	-
23	2005..	[[]]	[[]]	-
24	2005..	[[]]	[[]]	-
25	2005..	[[]]	[[]]	-
26	2005..	[[]]	[[]]	-
27	2005..	[[]]	[[]]	-
28	2005..	[[]]	[[]]	-
29	2005..	[[]]	[[]]	-
30	2005..	[[]]	[[]]	-
31	2005..	[[]]	[[]]	-
32	2005..	[[]]	[[]]	-
33	2005..	[[]]	[[]]	-
34	2005..	[[]]	[[]]	-

=== Emperor's Cup ===
Match	Date	Venue	Opponents	Score
4th Round	2005..	[[]]	[[]]	-
5th Round	2005..	[[]]	[[]]	-

=== J. League Cup ===
Match	Date	Venue	Opponents	Score
GL-C-1	2005..	[[]]	[[]]	-
GL-C-2	2005..	[[]]	[[]]	-
GL-C-3	2005..	[[]]	[[]]	-
GL-C-4	2005..	[[]]	[[]]	-
GL-C-5	2005..	[[]]	[[]]	-
GL-C-6	2005..	[[]]	[[]]	-
Quarterfinals-1	2005..	[[]]	[[]]	-
Quarterfinals-2	2005..	[[]]	[[]]	-
Semifinals-1	2005..	[[]]	[[]]	-
Semifinals-2	2005..	[[]]	[[]]	-
Final	2005..	[[]]	[[]]	-

== Player statistics ==
No.	Pos.	Player	D.o.B. (Age)	Height / Weight	J. League 1		Emperor's Cup		J. League Cup		Total	
No.	Pos.	Player	D.o.B. (Age)	Height / Weight	Apps	Goals	Apps	Goals	Apps	Goals	Apps	Goals
1	GK	Tomonori Tateishi	April 22, 1974 (aged 30)	cm / kg	12	0						
2	MF	Masataka Sakamoto	February 24, 1978 (aged 27)	cm / kg	34	2						
3	DF	Daisuke Saito	November 19, 1974 (aged 30)	cm / kg	33	1						
5	DF	Ilian Stoyanov	January 20, 1977 (aged 28)	cm / kg	30	1						
6	MF	Yuki Abe	September 6, 1981 (aged 23)	cm / kg	33	12						
7	MF	Yūto Satō	March 12, 1982 (aged 22)	cm / kg	34	8						
8	MF	Gabriel Popescu	December 25, 1973 (aged 31)	cm / kg	7	1						
9	FW	Takenori Hayashi	October 14, 1980 (aged 24)	cm / kg	30	4						
10	FW	Mario Haas	September 16, 1974 (aged 30)	cm / kg	25	6						
13	MF	Kunihiko Takizawa	April 20, 1978 (aged 26)	cm / kg	5	0						
14	MF	Haruki Seto	March 14, 1978 (aged 26)	cm / kg	0	0						
15	MF	Koji Nakajima	August 20, 1977 (aged 27)	cm / kg	11	1						
16	MF	Satoru Yamagishi	May 3, 1983 (aged 21)	cm / kg	30	2						
17	GK	Ryo Kushino	March 3, 1979 (aged 26)	cm / kg	22	0						
18	FW	Seiichiro Maki	August 7, 1980 (aged 24)	cm / kg	33	12						
19	FW	Yutaka Takahashi	September 29, 1980 (aged 24)	cm / kg	1	0						
20	MF	Kohei Kudo	August 28, 1984 (aged 20)	cm / kg	24	0						
21	GK	Daisuke Nakamaki	May 27, 1986 (aged 18)	cm / kg	0	0						
22	MF	Naotake Hanyu	December 22, 1979 (aged 25)	cm / kg	31	2						
23	MF	Takashi Rakuyama	August 11, 1980 (aged 24)	cm / kg	1	0						
24	DF	Kozo Yuki	January 23, 1979 (aged 26)	cm / kg	20	0						
25	FW	Yuichi Yoda	June 25, 1977 (aged 27)	cm / kg	5	1						
26	DF	Yoshiaki Fujita	January 12, 1983 (aged 22)	cm / kg	1	0						
27	DF	Hiroki Mizumoto	September 12, 1985 (aged 19)	cm / kg	15	0						
28	FW	Kyohei Horikawa	September 18, 1986 (aged 18)	cm / kg	0	0						
29	MF	Koki Mizuno	September 6, 1985 (aged 19)	cm / kg	25	3						
30	GK	Masahiro Okamoto	May 17, 1983 (aged 21)	cm / kg	0	0						
31	DF	Mitsuki Ichihara	January 31, 1986 (aged 19)	cm / kg	0	0						
32	FW	Kim Dong-Soo	September 8, 1986 (aged 18)	cm / kg	0	0						
33	FW	Yusuke Kawabuchi	April 21, 1986 (aged 18)	cm / kg	0	0						
34	MF	Kosuke Nakahara	March 17, 1987 (aged 17)	cm / kg	0	0						
35	MF	Hironobu Haga	December 21, 1982 (aged 22)	cm / kg	0	0						
36	MF	Tadashi Takeda	July 27, 1986 (aged 18)	cm / kg	0	0						
37	MF	Taisuke Matsugae	December 15, 1982 (aged 22)	cm / kg	0	0						

== Other pages ==
- (in Japanese) J. League official site
