= 2007 JEF United Chiba season =

JEF United Ichihara Chiba
2007 season
- Manager: Amar Osim
- Stadium: Fukuda Denshi Arena
- J. League 1: 13th
- Emperor's Cup: Fourth round
- J. League Cup: GL-A 3rd
- Top goalscorer: Koki Mizuno (9)

During the 2007 season, JEF United Ichihara Chiba competed in the J. League 1, where they finished 13th. The club also competed in the Emperor's Cup and the J. League Cup.

== Competitions ==
Competitions	Position
J. League 1	13th / 18 clubs
Emperor's Cup	4th Round
J. League Cup	GL-A 3rd / 4 clubs

=== J. League 1 ===
==== League table ====
Pos	Team	Pld	W	D	L	GF	GA	GD	Pts
11	Nagoya Grampus Eight	34	13	6	15	43	45	−2	45
12	FC Tokyo	34	14	3	17	49	58	−9	45
13	JEF United Chiba	34	12	6	16	51	56	−5	42
14	Oita Trinita	34	12	5	17	42	60	−18	41
15	Omiya Ardija	34	8	11	15	24	40	−16	35

Updated to match(es) played on December 1, 2007. Source: J. League Division 1
Rules for classification: 1) points; 2) goal difference; 3) number of goals scored.

==== Results ====
J.League Division 1 results
Date	Opponent	Venue	Result F–A
4 March 2007	Nagoya Grampus Eight	A	0–2
10 March 2007	Shimizu S-Pulse	H	1–3
17 March 2007	Kashima Antlers	H	3–3
31 March 2007	Júbilo Iwata	A	0–1
8 April 2007	Yokohama FC	H	4–0
14 April 2007	Vissel Kobe	A	1–2
21 April 2007	Omiya Ardija	H	1–0
29 April 2007	Kawasaki Frontale	A	1–1
3 May 2007	Urawa Red Diamonds	A	1–1
6 May 2007	Kashiwa Reysol	H	1–1
12 May 2007	FC Tokyo	A	1–4
19 May 2007	Sanfrecce Hiroshima	H	1–3
26 May 2007	Gamba Osaka	H	1–2
9 June 2007	Yokohama F. Marinos	A	0–1
17 June 2007	Ventforet Kofu	H	3–2
20 June 2007	Oita Trinita	A	1–0
23 June 2007	Albirex Niigata	H	1–2
30 June 2007	Yokohama FC	A	1–0
11 August 2007	Kawasaki Frontale	H	1–3
15 August 2007	Kashima Antlers	A	1–3
18 August 2007	Júbilo Iwata	H	3–2
25 August 2007	Kashiwa Reysol	A	0–1
29 August 2007	Oita Trinita	H	6–0
1 September 2007	Albirex Niigata	A	1–0
15 September 2007	Vissel Kobe	H	4–2
22 September 2007	Omiya Ardija	A	1–0
30 September 2007	FC Tokyo	H	3–2
6 October 2007	Ventforet Kofu	A	1–0
20 October 2007	Urawa Red Diamonds	H	2–4
27 October 2007	Sanfrecce Hiroshima	A	2–2
10 November 2007	Gamba Osaka	A	0–2
18 November 2007	Yokohama F. Marinos	H	2–3
24 November 2007	Shimizu S-Pulse	A	2–2
1 December 2007	Nagoya Grampus Eight	H	0–2

== Player statistics ==
No.	Pos.	Player	D.o.B. (Age)	Height / Weight	J. League 1		Emperor's Cup		J. League Cup		Total	
No.	Pos.	Player	D.o.B. (Age)	Height / Weight	Apps	Goals	Apps	Goals	Apps	Goals	Apps	Goals
1	GK	Tomonori Tateishi	22 April 1974 (aged 32)	cm / kg	26	0						
3	DF	Daisuke Saito	19 November 1974 (aged 32)	cm / kg	27	1						
4	DF	Hiroki Mizumoto	12 September 1985 (aged 21)	cm / kg	31	1						
5	DF	Ilian Stoyanov	20 January 1977 (aged 30)	cm / kg	9	1						
6	MF	Tomi Shimomura	18 December 1980 (aged 26)	cm / kg	26	0						
7	MF	Yūto Satō	12 March 1982 (aged 24)	cm / kg	27	3						
8	MF	Koki Mizuno	6 September 1985 (aged 21)	cm / kg	29	9						
9	FW	Teruaki Kurobe	6 March 1978 (aged 28)	cm / kg	11	0						
10	FW	Reinaldo	14 March 1979 (aged 27)	cm / kg	14	2						
11	FW	Tatsunori Arai	22 December 1983 (aged 23)	cm / kg	25	5						
13	DF	Mitsuki Ichihara	31 January 1986 (aged 21)	cm / kg	1	0						
14	DF	Shohei Ikeda	27 April 1981 (aged 25)	cm / kg	13	0						
15	MF	Koji Nakajima	20 August 1977 (aged 29)	cm / kg	27	0						
16	MF	Satoru Yamagishi	3 May 1983 (aged 23)	cm / kg	34	6						
18	FW	Seiichiro Maki	7 August 1980 (aged 26)	cm / kg	34	5						
19	MF	Atsushi Ito	24 September 1983 (aged 23)	cm / kg	7	0						
20	MF	Kohei Kudo	28 August 1984 (aged 22)	cm / kg	33	4						
21	GK	Daisuke Nakamaki	27 May 1986 (aged 20)	cm / kg	0	0						
22	MF	Naotake Hanyu	22 December 1979 (aged 27)	cm / kg	29	6						
23	MF	Takashi Rakuyama	11 August 1980 (aged 26)	cm / kg	15	0						
24	DF	Kozo Yuki	23 January 1979 (aged 28)	cm / kg	1	0						
25	FW	Hibiki Kato	14 November 1987 (aged 19)	cm / kg	0	0						
26	FW	Ryo Kanazawa	19 October 1988 (aged 18)	cm / kg	0	0						
27	FW	Tomoya Kumagai	25 March 1988 (aged 18)	cm / kg	0	0						
28	FW	Kyohei Horikawa	18 September 1986 (aged 20)	cm / kg	0	0						
29	FW	Kota Aoki	27 April 1987 (aged 19)	cm / kg	19	3						
30	GK	Masahiro Okamoto	17 May 1983 (aged 23)	cm / kg	8	0						
31	MF	Koki Yonekura	17 May 1988 (aged 18)	cm / kg	3	0						
32	FW	Kim Dong-Soo	8 September 1986 (aged 20)	cm / kg	0	0						
33	DF	Seiko Yamanaka	22 January 1989 (aged 18)	cm / kg	0	0						
34	MF	Kosuke Nakahara	17 March 1987 (aged 19)	cm / kg	0	0						
35	MF	Koji Asato	14 October 1987 (aged 19)	cm / kg	0	0						
36	MF	Tadashi Takeda	27 July 1986 (aged 20)	cm / kg	0	0						
37	MF	Park Jong-Jin	24 June 1987 (aged 19)	cm / kg	10	0						
38	DF	Norihiro Kawakami	4 April 1987 (aged 19)	cm / kg	0	0						
39	MF	Ken Matsumoto	28 August 1987 (aged 19)	cm / kg	0	0						
40	DF	Nenad Đorđević	7 August 1979 (aged 27)	cm / kg	13	3						

== Other pages ==
- (in Japanese) J. League official site
