= 2015 V-Varen Nagasaki season =

V-Varen Nagasaki
2015 season
- Manager: Takuya Takagi
- Stadium: Nagasaki Stadium
- J2 League: 6th

2015 V-Varen Nagasaki season.

== J2 League ==
=== League table ===
Pos	Team	Pld	W	D	L	GF	GA	GD	Pts	Promotion, qualification or relegation
5	Ehime FC	42	19	8	15	47	39	+8	65	Qualification for promotion playoffs (Note: Only teams that meet J1 license criteria can participate in promotion playoffs. If one or more teams fail to meet the criteria, only eligible teams that finished 3rd to 6th will participate and no replacement teams will be added.)
6	V-Varen Nagasaki	42	15	15	12	42	33	+9	60	Qualification for promotion playoffs
7	Giravanz Kitakyushu	42	18	5	19	59	58	+1	59	

Source: Meiji Yasuda J2 League Standing
Rules for classification: 1) Points; 2) Goal difference; 3) Goals scored

=== Match details ===
J2 League match details
Match	Date	Team	Score	Team	Venue	Attendance
1	2015.03.08	V-Varen Nagasaki	0-1	JEF United Chiba	Nagasaki Stadium	5,404
2	2015.03.15	Consadole Sapporo	0-1	V-Varen Nagasaki	Sapporo Dome	18,086
3	2015.03.21	V-Varen Nagasaki	2-0	Giravanz Kitakyushu	Nagasaki Stadium	3,754
4	2015.03.29	V-Varen Nagasaki	1-1	Tokyo Verdy	Nagasaki Stadium	3,446
5	2015.04.01	Thespakusatsu Gunma	0-1	V-Varen Nagasaki	Shoda Shoyu Stadium Gunma	1,767
6	2015.04.05	V-Varen Nagasaki	1-0	Tochigi SC	Nagasaki Stadium	2,858
7	2015.04.11	Kyoto Sanga FC	1-4	V-Varen Nagasaki	Kyoto Nishikyogoku Athletic Stadium	6,095
8	2015.04.19	Yokohama FC	2-2	V-Varen Nagasaki	NHK Spring Mitsuzawa Football Stadium	3,849
9	2015.04.26	V-Varen Nagasaki	0-1	Oita Trinita	Nagasaki Stadium	5,560
10	2015.04.29	FC Gifu	1-0	V-Varen Nagasaki	Gifu Nagaragawa Stadium	5,003
11	2015.05.03	V-Varen Nagasaki	2-2	Fagiano Okayama	Nagasaki Stadium	3,389
12	2015.05.06	Mito HollyHock	1-3	V-Varen Nagasaki	Kasamatsu Stadium	4,611
13	2015.05.09	V-Varen Nagasaki	1-1	Tokushima Vortis	Nagasaki Stadium	3,130
14	2015.05.17	Cerezo Osaka	1-2	V-Varen Nagasaki	Kincho Stadium	10,900
15	2015.05.24	V-Varen Nagasaki	3-1	Ehime FC	Nagasaki Stadium	3,105
16	2015.05.31	Zweigen Kanazawa	1-0	V-Varen Nagasaki	Ishikawa Athletics Stadium	5,514
17	2015.06.06	Roasso Kumamoto	1-0	V-Varen Nagasaki	Kumamoto Suizenji Stadium	4,560
18	2015.06.14	V-Varen Nagasaki	0-1	Júbilo Iwata	Nagasaki Stadium	5,720
19	2015.06.21	Kamatamare Sanuki	0-0	V-Varen Nagasaki	Kagawa Marugame Stadium	2,729
20	2015.06.28	V-Varen Nagasaki	0-0	Avispa Fukuoka	Nagasaki Stadium	4,841
21	2015.07.04	V-Varen Nagasaki	0-1	Omiya Ardija	Nagasaki Stadium	4,629
22	2015.07.08	Fagiano Okayama	1-1	V-Varen Nagasaki	City Light Stadium	6,408
23	2015.07.12	V-Varen Nagasaki	1-0	Kyoto Sanga FC	Nagasaki Stadium	2,893
24	2015.07.18	Oita Trinita	2-1	V-Varen Nagasaki	Oita Bank Dome	7,866
25	2015.07.22	V-Varen Nagasaki	1-0	Thespakusatsu Gunma	Nagasaki Stadium	2,289
26	2015.07.26	Avispa Fukuoka	0-0	V-Varen Nagasaki	Level5 Stadium	5,757
27	2015.08.01	V-Varen Nagasaki	2-0	Yokohama FC	Nagasaki Stadium	6,496
28	2015.08.08	V-Varen Nagasaki	0-0	Consadole Sapporo	Nagasaki Stadium	8,854
29	2015.08.15	JEF United Chiba	1-1	V-Varen Nagasaki	Fukuda Denshi Arena	10,284
30	2015.08.23	V-Varen Nagasaki	0-0	Kamatamare Sanuki	Nagasaki Stadium	3,630
31	2015.09.13	Tokushima Vortis	0-0	V-Varen Nagasaki	Pocarisweat Stadium	8,684
32	2015.09.20	Tokyo Verdy	0-1	V-Varen Nagasaki	Ajinomoto Field Nishigaoka	3,822
33	2015.09.23	V-Varen Nagasaki	1-1	Zweigen Kanazawa	Nagasaki Stadium	3,727
34	2015.09.27	Tochigi SC	0-1	V-Varen Nagasaki	Tochigi Green Stadium	3,812
35	2015.10.04	V-Varen Nagasaki	1-2	Roasso Kumamoto	Nagasaki Stadium	5,250
36	2015.10.10	Ehime FC	0-0	V-Varen Nagasaki	Ningineer Stadium	3,337
37	2015.10.18	V-Varen Nagasaki	2-1	FC Gifu	Nagasaki Stadium	5,325
38	2015.10.25	V-Varen Nagasaki	0-0	Mito HollyHock	Nagasaki Stadium	5,042
39	2015.11.01	Omiya Ardija	2-1	V-Varen Nagasaki	NACK5 Stadium Omiya	10,600
40	2015.11.08	Júbilo Iwata	4-2	V-Varen Nagasaki	Yamaha Stadium	10,764
41	2015.11.14	V-Varen Nagasaki	2-0	Cerezo Osaka	Nagasaki Stadium	7,962
42	2015.11.23	Giravanz Kitakyushu	2-1	V-Varen Nagasaki	Honjo Stadium	8,501
