= Kota Aoki =

Japanese footballer (born 1987)

Kota Aoki 青木 孝太
Personal information
- Full name: Kota Aoki
- Date of birth: April 27, 1987 (age 39)
- Place of birth: Omihachiman, Japan
- Height: 1.76 m (5 ft 9 1/2 in)
- Position: Forward

Youth career
- 2003–2005: Yasu High School

Senior career*
Years	Team	Apps	(Gls)
2006–2011	JEF United Chiba	80	(11)
2009	→ Fagiano Okayama (loan)	31	(6)
2012	Ventforet Kofu	13	(0)
2013–2014	Thespakusatsu Gunma	81	(9)
Total		205	(26)

International career
2006–2007	Japan U-20	9	(2)
Medal record
JEF United Chiba
Winner	J.League Cup	2006
Representing Japan
AFC U-19 Championship
Silver medal – second place	2006 India
- * Club domestic league appearances and goals

Kota Aoki (青木 孝太, Aoki Kōta; born April 27, 1987) is a former Japanese football player.

== Club career ==
Aoki was born in Omihachiman on April 27, 1987. After graduating from high school, he joined JEF United Chiba in 2006. From 2007, he played many matches. However he lost his opportunity to play in 2009 and he moved to Fagiano Okayama in June 2009. At Okayama, he became a regular player. He returned to JEF United in 2010 and played until 2011. Through Ventforet Kofu in 2012, he moved to Thespakusatsu Gunma in 2013. Although he played many matches in 2 seasons, he retired at the end of the 2014 season.

== National team career ==
In July 2007, Aoki was elected Japan U-20 national team for the 2007 U-20 World Cup. At this tournament, he played all 4 matches.

== Career statistics ==
Appearances and goals by club, season and competition
Club	Season	League			Emperor's Cup		J.League Cup		Total	
Club	Season	Division	Apps	Goals	Apps	Goals	Apps	Goals	Apps	Goals
JEF United Chiba	2006	J1 League	3	1	0	0	0	0	3	1
JEF United Chiba	2007	J1 League	19	3	1	0	3	0	23	3
JEF United Chiba	2008	J1 League	13	0	0	0	2	0	15	0
JEF United Chiba	2009	J1 League	0	0	0	0	0	0	0	0
Fagiano Okayama	2009	J2 League	31	6	1	0	—		32	6
JEF United Chiba	2010	J2 League								
Career total			66	10	2	0	5	0	73	10

== National team statistics ==
=== Appearances in major competitions ===
Team	Competition	Category	Appearances		Goals	Team record
Team	Competition	Category	Start	Sub	Goals	Team record
Japan	AFC Youth Championship 2006	U-19	2	3	2	2nd place
Japan	2007 FIFA U-20 World Cup	U-20	0	4	0	Round of 16
