= Masataka Sakamoto =

Japanese footballer

Masataka Sakamoto 坂本 將貴
Personal information
- Full name: Masataka Sakamoto
- Date of birth: February 24, 1978 (age 48)
- Place of birth: Saitama, Japan
- Height: 1.71 m (5 ft 7 1/2 in)
- Position: Midfielder

Youth career
- 1993–1995: Urawa Higashi High School
- 1996–1999: Nippon Sport Science University

Senior career*
Years	Team	Apps	(Gls)
2000–2006	JEF United Chiba	176	(9)
2007	Albirex Niigata	34	(2)
2008–2012	JEF United Chiba	117	(2)
Total		327	(13)

Managerial career
- 2019–2023: JEF United Chiba (assistant coach)
- 2024—: Japan national team (individual coach)
Medal record
JEF United Chiba
Winner	J.League Cup	2005
Winner	J.League Cup	2006
- * Club domestic league appearances and goals

Masataka Sakamoto (坂本 將貴, Sakamoto Masataka; born February 24, 1978) is a former Japanese football player.He currently works as an individual coach for the Japan national team.

== Playing career ==
Sakamoto was born in Saitama on February 24, 1978. After graduating from Nippon Sport Science University, he joined J1 League club JEF United Ichihara (later JEF United Chiba) in 2000. He became a regular player as right side midfielder from summer 2001. He also played as defensive midfielder not only right side midfielder. He played all matches in league competition except for one game for suspension in 2004 until 2006. The club won the champions J.League Cup for 2 years in a row (2005-2006). In 2007, he moved to Albirex Niigata. He played in all 34 matches as left side back and left midfielder. In 2008, he returned to JEF United Chiba. He played many matches as right side back. However the club results were bad and was relegated to J2 League first time in the club history from 2010. His opportunity to play also decreased from 2010 and he retired end of 2012 season.

== Career statistics ==
Appearances and goals by club, season and competition
Club	Season	League			Emperor's Cup		J.League Cup		Total	
Club	Season	Division	Apps	Goals	Apps	Goals	Apps	Goals	Apps	Goals
JEF United Ichihara	2000	J1 League	0	0	0	0	0	0	0	0
JEF United Ichihara	2001	J1 League	19	3	3	0	4	0	26	3
JEF United Ichihara	2002	J1 League	30	1	4	0	7	0	41	1
JEF United Ichihara	2003	J1 League	30	1	3	1	2	0	35	2
JEF United Ichihara	2004	J1 League	29	1	1	0	4	0	34	1
JEF United Chiba	2005	J1 League	34	2	2	0	11	0	47	2
JEF United Chiba	2006	J1 League	34	1	1	0	11	3	46	4
Albirex Niigata	2007	J1 League	34	2	1	1	6	0	41	3
JEF United Chiba	2008	J1 League	32	1	0	0	8	0	40	1
JEF United Chiba	2009	J1 League	33	1	2	0	6	0	41	1
JEF United Chiba	2010	J2 League	21	0	1	0	—		22	0
JEF United Chiba	2011	J2 League	22	0	2	0	—		24	0
JEF United Chiba	2012	J2 League	9	0	1	0	—		10	0
Career total			327	13	21	2	59	3	407	18

== Honors ==
Team

- J.League Cup Champion: 2005, 2006
