= 2008 JEF United Chiba season =

JEF United Ichihara Chiba
2008 season
- Manager: Josip Kuže; Alex Miller
- Stadium: Fukuda Denshi Arena
- J. League 1: 15th
- Emperor's Cup: 4th Round
- J. League Cup: Quarterfinals
- Top goalscorer: Seiichiro Maki (11)

2008 JEF United Ichihara Chiba season

== Competitions ==
Competitions	Position
J. League 1	15th / 18 clubs
Emperor's Cup	4th Round
J. League Cup	Quarterfinals

== Domestic results ==
=== J. League 1 ===
Match	Date	Venue	Opponents	Score
1	2008..			-
2	2008..			-
3	2008..			-
4	2008..			-
5	2008..			-
6	2008..			-
7	2008..			-
8	2008..			-
9	2008..			-
10	2008..			-
11	2008..			-
12	2008..			-
13	2008..			-
14	2008..			-
15	2008..			-
16	2008..			-
17	2008..			-
18	2008..			-
19	2008..			-
20	2008..			-
21	2008..			-
22	2008..			-
23	2008..			-
24	2008..			-
25	2008..			-
26	2008..			-
27	2008..			-
28	2008..			-
29	2008..			-
30	2008..			-
31	2008..			-
32	2008..			-
33	2008..			-
34	2008..			-

=== Emperor's Cup ===
Match	Date	Venue	Opponents	Score
4th Round	2008..			-

=== J. League Cup ===
Match	Date	Venue	Opponents	Score
GL-C-1	2008..			-
GL-C-2	2008..			-
GL-C-3	2008..			-
GL-C-4	2008..			-
GL-C-5	2008..			-
GL-C-6	2008..			-
Quarterfinals-1	2008..			-
Quarterfinals-2	2008..			-

== Player statistics ==
No.	Pos.	Player	D.o.B. (Age)	Height / Weight	J. League 1		Emperor's Cup		J. League Cup		Total	
No.	Pos.	Player	D.o.B. (Age)	Height / Weight	Apps	Goals	Apps	Goals	Apps	Goals	Apps	Goals
1	GK	Tomonori Tateishi	April 22, 1974 (aged 33)	cm / kg	12	0						
2	MF	Masataka Sakamoto	February 24, 1978 (aged 30)	cm / kg	32	1						
3	DF	Daisuke Saito	November 19, 1974 (aged 33)	cm / kg	24	1						
4	DF	Eddy Bosnar	April 29, 1980 (aged 27)	cm / kg	30	2						
5	DF	Kozo Yuki	January 23, 1979 (aged 29)	cm / kg	2	0						
6	MF	Tomi Shimomura	December 18, 1980 (aged 27)	cm / kg	33	0						
7	MF	Kohei Kudo	August 28, 1984 (aged 23)	cm / kg	32	2						
8	MF	Yuta Baba	January 22, 1984 (aged 24)	cm / kg	6	0						
9	FW	Kota Aoki	April 27, 1987 (aged 20)	cm / kg	13	0						
10	FW	Reinaldo	March 14, 1979 (aged 28)	cm / kg	23	2						
11	FW	Tatsunori Arai	December 22, 1983 (aged 24)	cm / kg	23	3						
13	DF	Mitsuki Ichihara	January 31, 1986 (aged 22)	cm / kg	3	0						
14	DF	Shohei Ikeda	April 27, 1981 (aged 26)	cm / kg	27	0						
15	MF	Koji Nakajima	August 20, 1977 (aged 30)	cm / kg	13	0						
16	MF	Tatsuya Yazawa	October 3, 1984 (aged 23)	cm / kg	28	7						
17	GK	Ryo Kushino	March 3, 1979 (aged 29)	cm / kg	1	0						
18	FW	Seiichiro Maki	August 7, 1980 (aged 27)	cm / kg	30	11						
19	MF	Atsushi Ito	September 24, 1983 (aged 24)	cm / kg	2	1						
20	FW	Takuya Kokeguchi	July 13, 1985 (aged 22)	cm / kg	9	0						
21	GK	Daisuke Nakamaki	May 27, 1986 (aged 21)	cm / kg	0	0						
22	MF	Koki Yonekura	May 17, 1988 (aged 19)	cm / kg	8	0						
23	MF	Takashi Rakuyama	August 11, 1980 (aged 27)	cm / kg	3	0						
24	DF	Junya Tanaka	April 24, 1983 (aged 24)	cm / kg	0	0						
25	FW	Hibiki Kato	November 14, 1987 (aged 20)	cm / kg	0	0						
26	FW	Ryo Kanazawa	October 19, 1988 (aged 19)	cm / kg	1	0						
27	FW	Tomoya Kumagai	March 25, 1988 (aged 19)	cm / kg	0	0						
28	FW	Kyohei Horikawa	September 18, 1986 (aged 21)	cm / kg	0	0						
29	MF	Tsukasa Masuyama	January 25, 1990 (aged 18)	cm / kg	1	0						
30	GK	Masahiro Okamoto	May 17, 1983 (aged 24)	cm / kg	21	0						
31	DF	Ryota Aoki	August 19, 1984 (aged 23)	cm / kg	29	1						
32	FW	Kim Dong-Soo	September 8, 1986 (aged 21)	cm / kg	0	0						
33	DF	Seiko Yamanaka	January 22, 1989 (aged 19)	cm / kg	0	0						
34	MF	Kosuke Nakahara	March 17, 1987 (aged 20)	cm / kg	0	0						
35	DF	Kengo Takada	August 24, 1989 (aged 18)	cm / kg	0	0						
36	MF	Tadashi Takeda	July 27, 1986 (aged 21)	cm / kg	0	0						
36	FW	Masaki Fukai	September 13, 1980 (aged 27)	cm / kg	11	4						
38	DF	Norihiro Kawakami	April 4, 1987 (aged 20)	cm / kg	0	0						
39	MF	Ken Matsumoto	August 28, 1987 (aged 20)	cm / kg	8	0						
40	MF	Mirko Hrgović	February 5, 1979 (aged 29)	cm / kg	7	0						
41	MF	Tatsuro Inui	January 30, 1990 (aged 18)	cm / kg	0	0						
41	MF	Kazuyuki Toda	December 30, 1977 (aged 30)	cm / kg	12	0						
42/41	FW	Yasuhiro Okuyama	November 21, 1985 (aged 22)	cm / kg	0	0						
43	DF	Yuichi Nemoto	July 21, 1981 (aged 26)	cm / kg	7	0						
44	MF	Michael	January 21, 1982 (aged 26)	cm / kg	10	1						
45	DF	Tomonobu Hayakawa	July 11, 1977 (aged 30)	cm / kg	5	0						

== Other pages ==
- (in Japanese) J. League official site
