= 2014 V-Varen Nagasaki season =

V-Varen Nagasaki
2014 season
- Manager: Takuya Takagi
- Stadium: Nagasaki Stadium
- J2 League: 14th

2014 V-Varen Nagasaki season.

== J2 League ==
Match	Date	Team	Score	Team	Venue	Attendance
1	2014.03.02	V-Varen Nagasaki	2-0	Thespakusatsu Gunma	Nagasaki Stadium	5,248
2	2014.03.09	V-Varen Nagasaki	0-3	Shonan Bellmare	Nagasaki Stadium	4,294
3	2014.03.16	Matsumoto Yamaga FC	0-0	V-Varen Nagasaki	Matsumotodaira Park Stadium	14,048
4	2014.03.22	V-Varen Nagasaki	2-1	JEF United Chiba	Nagasaki Stadium	3,757
5	2014.03.30	Tokyo Verdy	1-5	V-Varen Nagasaki	Ajinomoto Stadium	2,529
6	2014.04.05	V-Varen Nagasaki	1-1	Giravanz Kitakyushu	Nagasaki Stadium	3,048
7	2014.04.13	Avispa Fukuoka	2-5	V-Varen Nagasaki	Level5 Stadium	4,833
8	2014.04.20	V-Varen Nagasaki	2-1	Ehime FC	Nagasaki Stadium	3,340
9	2014.04.26	Roasso Kumamoto	1-1	V-Varen Nagasaki	Umakana-Yokana Stadium	7,355
10	2014.04.29	V-Varen Nagasaki	0-0	Oita Trinita	Nagasaki Stadium	6,121
11	2014.05.03	Júbilo Iwata	1-0	V-Varen Nagasaki	Yamaha Stadium	9,257
12	2014.05.06	V-Varen Nagasaki	1-1	Mito HollyHock	Nagasaki Stadium	4,478
13	2014.05.11	Kyoto Sanga FC	2-0	V-Varen Nagasaki	Kagoshima Kamoike Stadium	5,417
14	2014.05.18	V-Varen Nagasaki	1-1	Tochigi SC	Nagasaki Stadium	4,016
15	2014.05.24	Fagiano Okayama	2-1	V-Varen Nagasaki	Kanko Stadium	7,290
16	2014.05.31	V-Varen Nagasaki	1-1	Kamatamare Sanuki	Nagasaki Stadium	3,031
17	2014.06.07	Yokohama FC	1-2	V-Varen Nagasaki	NHK Spring Mitsuzawa Football Stadium	2,577
18	2014.06.14	V-Varen Nagasaki	0-0	Montedio Yamagata	Nagasaki Stadium	3,819
19	2014.06.21	FC Gifu	1-1	V-Varen Nagasaki	Gifu Nagaragawa Stadium	13,016
20	2014.06.28	Kataller Toyama	1-0	V-Varen Nagasaki	Toyama Stadium	2,622
21	2014.07.05	V-Varen Nagasaki	0-1	Consadole Sapporo	Nagasaki Stadium	4,290
22	2014.07.20	V-Varen Nagasaki	0-2	Matsumoto Yamaga FC	Nagasaki Stadium	4,801
23	2014.07.26	JEF United Chiba	1-1	V-Varen Nagasaki	Fukuda Denshi Arena	11,458
24	2014.07.30	Mito HollyHock	0-0	V-Varen Nagasaki	K's denki Stadium Mito	3,711
25	2014.08.03	V-Varen Nagasaki	0-2	FC Gifu	Nagasaki Stadium	5,880
26	2014.08.10	Thespakusatsu Gunma	2-4	V-Varen Nagasaki	Kumagaya Athletic Stadium	1,509
27	2014.08.17	V-Varen Nagasaki	0-0	Avispa Fukuoka	Nagasaki Stadium	5,231
28	2014.08.24	Giravanz Kitakyushu	2-1	V-Varen Nagasaki	Honjo Stadium	3,658
29	2014.08.31	V-Varen Nagasaki	2-0	Kataller Toyama	Nagasaki Stadium	3,502
30	2014.09.06	Consadole Sapporo	2-1	V-Varen Nagasaki	Sapporo Dome	9,123
31	2014.09.14	V-Varen Nagasaki	1-1	Júbilo Iwata	Nagasaki Stadium	12,638
32	2014.09.19	V-Varen Nagasaki	1-0	Yokohama FC	Nagasaki Stadium	3,905
33	2014.09.23	Kamatamare Sanuki	0-1	V-Varen Nagasaki	Kagawa Marugame Stadium	2,501
34	2014.09.28	Oita Trinita	1-1	V-Varen Nagasaki	Oita Bank Dome	8,212
35	2014.10.04	V-Varen Nagasaki	1-1	Fagiano Okayama	Nagasaki City Kakidomari Stadium	3,017
36	2014.10.11	Montedio Yamagata	2-1	V-Varen Nagasaki	ND Soft Stadium Yamagata	5,406
37	2014.10.19	Shonan Bellmare	1-2	V-Varen Nagasaki	Shonan BMW Stadium Hiratsuka	8,691
38	2014.10.26	V-Varen Nagasaki	0-1	Roasso Kumamoto	Nagasaki City Kakidomari Stadium	4,262
39	2014.11.01	Ehime FC	0-3	V-Varen Nagasaki	Ningineer Stadium	4,869
40	2014.11.09	V-Varen Nagasaki	0-0	Tokyo Verdy	Nagasaki Stadium	6,592
41	2014.11.15	V-Varen Nagasaki	0-1	Kyoto Sanga FC	Nagasaki Stadium	6,341
42	2014.11.23	Tochigi SC	1-0	V-Varen Nagasaki	Tochigi Green Stadium	5,943
