= Takashi Rakuyama =

Japanese footballer

Takashi Rakuyama 楽山 孝志
Personal information
- Full name: Takashi Rakuyama
- Date of birth: August 11, 1980 (age 46)
- Place of birth: Uozu, Toyama, Japan
- Height: 1.77 m (5 ft 9 1/2 in)
- Position: Midfielder

Youth career
- 1996–1998: Shimizu Shogyo High School

College career
Years	Team	Apps	(Gls)
1999–2002	Chukyo University		

Senior career*
Years	Team	Apps	(Gls)
2003–2008	JEF United Chiba	41	(0)
2008–2009	Sanfrecce Hiroshima	24	(0)
2010	Khimki	12	(0)
2011–2013	Shenzhen Ruby	85	(4)
Total		162	(4)
Medal record
JEF United Chiba
Winner	J.League Cup	2005
Winner	J.League Cup	2006
- * Club domestic league appearances and goals

Takashi Rakuyama (楽山 孝志, Rakuyama Takashi; born August 11, 1980) is a former Japanese football player.

== Early life ==
Rakuyama was born in Uozu on August 11, 1980. Rakuyama graduated from Chukyo University.

== Playing career ==
Rakuyama joined J1 League club JEF United Chiba in 2003. He got opportunities to play from first season and played many matches as midfielder from 2006. JEF United won the champions in 2005 and 2006 J.League Cup. In July 2008, he moved to J2 League club Sanfrecce Hiroshima. He played as substitute midfielder. Sanfrecce also won the champions in 2008 season and was promoted to J1. In 2010, he moved to Russian First Division club FC Khimki. In 2011, he moved to Chinese Super League club Shenzhen Ruby. Although the club was relegated to League One, he played many matches until 2013. He retired end of 2013 season.

== Club statistics ==
Club performance			League		Cup		League Cup		Total	
Season	Club	League	Apps	Goals	Apps	Goals	Apps	Goals	Apps	Goals
Japan			League		Emperor's Cup		J.League Cup		Total	
2003	JEF United Ichihara	J1 League	1	0	2	0	2	0	5	0
2004	JEF United Ichihara	J1 League	8	0	1	0	3	1	12	1
2005	JEF United Chiba	J1 League	1	0	2	0	5	0	8	0
2006	JEF United Chiba	J1 League	13	0	1	0	8	0	22	0
2007	JEF United Chiba	J1 League	15	0	1	0	3	0	19	0
2008	JEF United Chiba	J1 League	3	0	-		2	0	5	0
2008	Sanfrecce Hiroshima	J2 League	10	0	3	0	-		13	0
2009	Sanfrecce Hiroshima	J1 League	14	0	1	0	2	0	17	0
Russia			League		Russian Cup		League Cup		Total	
2010	Khimki	First Division	12	0	0	0	-		12	0
China PR			League		FA Cup		CSL Cup		Total	
2011	Shenzhen Ruby	Super League	29	1	0	0	-		29	1
2012	Shenzhen Ruby	League One	28	0	2	0	-		30	0
2013	Shenzhen Ruby	League One	28	3	1	0	-		29	3
Career total			162	4	14	0	25	1	201	5
