= Koji Nakajima =

Japanese footballer

Koji Nakajima 中島 浩司
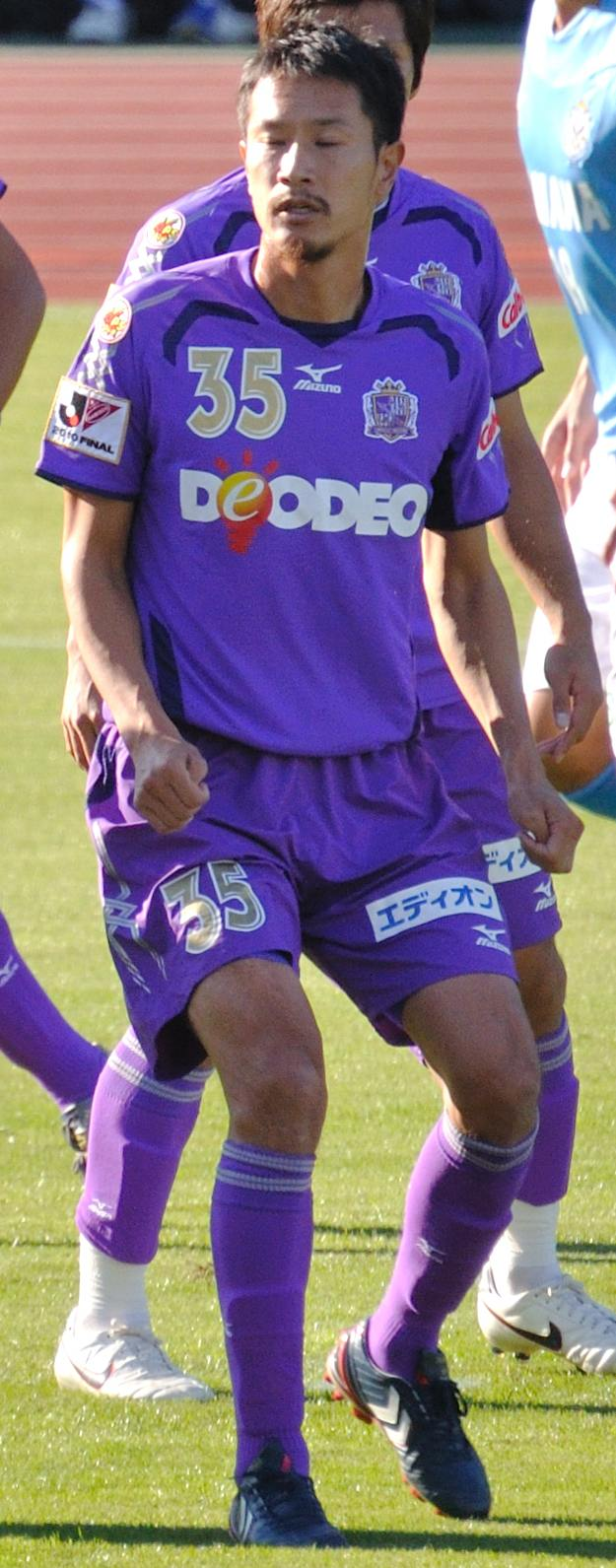
- Nakajima with Sanfrecce Hiroshima in 2010

Personal information
- Full name: Koji Nakajima
- Date of birth: August 20, 1977 (age 49)
- Place of birth: Sakai, Japan
- Height: 1.82 m (6 ft 0 in)
- Position: Midfielder

Youth career
- 1993–1995: Sendai Ikuei High School

Senior career*
Years	Team	Apps	(Gls)
1996–2002	Vegalta Sendai	83	(4)
2003–2008	JEF United Chiba	96	(2)
2009–2013	Sanfrecce Hiroshima	99	(5)
Total		278	(11)
Medal record
JEF United Chiba
Winner	J.League Cup	2005
Winner	J.League Cup	2006
Sanfrecce Hiroshima
Winner	J1 League	2012
Winner	J1 League	2013
Runner-up	J.League Cup	2010
Runner-up	Emperor's Cup	2013
- * Club domestic league appearances and goals

Koji Nakajima (中島 浩司, Nakajima Koji; born August 20, 1977) is a former Japanese football player.

== Playing career ==
Nakajima was born in Sakai on August 20, 1977. After graduating from high school, he joined Japan Football League club Brummel Sendai (later Vegalta Sendai) in 1996. He played many matches as defensive midfielder from 1997 and the club was promoted to J2 League from 1999. However his opportunity to play decreased and he could not play at all in the match from 2001. Although the club was promoted to J1 League from 2002, he could not play at all in the match and he was released from the club end of 2002 season. In 2003, he moved to J1 club JEF United Ichihara (later JEF United Chiba). He was appreciated by manager Ivica Osim and also played many matches as center back not only defensive midfielder. The club also won the champions 2005 and 2006 J.League Cup. Although he played many matches after Osim left the club in 2006, he could hardly play in the match since Alex Miller became new manager in May 2008. In 2009, he moved to Sanfrecce Hiroshima. He became a regular player as defensive midfielder and center back. The club also won the 2nd place 2010 J.League Cup. From 2012, although he could not play many matches, the club won the champions 2012 and 2013 J1 League. He retired end of 2013 season.

== Club statistics ==
Club performance			League		Cup		League Cup		Continental		Total	
Season	Club	League	Apps	Goals	Apps	Goals	Apps	Goals	Apps	Goals	Apps	Goals
Japan			League		Emperor's Cup		J.League Cup		Asia		Total	
1996	Brummel Sendai	Football League	0	0	0	0	-		-		0	0
1997	Brummel Sendai	Football League	17	1	1	0	0	0	-		18	1
1998	Brummel Sendai	Football League	21	1	4	1	4	0	-		29	2
1999	Vegalta Sendai	J2 League	26	2	2	1	2	1	-		30	4
2000	Vegalta Sendai	J2 League	19	0	0	0	1	0	-		20	0
2001	Vegalta Sendai	J2 League	0	0	0	0	0	0	-		0	0
2002	Vegalta Sendai	J1 League	0	0	0	0	0	0	-		0	0
Total			83	4	7	2	7	1	-		97	7
2003	JEF United Ichihara	J1 League	3	0	3	0	3	1	-		9	1
2004	JEF United Ichihara	J1 League	16	0	1	0	5	0	-		22	0
2005	JEF United Chiba	J1 League	11	1	2	0	5	1	-		18	2
2006	JEF United Chiba	J1 League	26	1	1	0	7	1	-		34	2
2007	JEF United Chiba	J1 League	27	0	1	0	2	0	-		30	0
2008	JEF United Chiba	J1 League	13	0	1	0	3	1	-		17	1
Total			96	2	9	0	25	4	-		130	6
2009	Sanfrecce Hiroshima	J1 League	30	0	2	0	6	1	-		38	1
2010	Sanfrecce Hiroshima	J1 League	32	2	2	0	5	0	6	0	45	2
2011	Sanfrecce Hiroshima	J1 League	33	2	2	0	2	0	-		37	2
2012	Sanfrecce Hiroshima	J1 League	2	1	0	0	5	0	-		7	1
2013	Sanfrecce Hiroshima	J1 League	2	0	0	0	0	0	4	0	6	0
Total			99	5	6	0	18	1	10	0	133	6
Career total			278	11	22	2	50	6	10	0	360	19
