= Yuichi Yoda =

Japanese footballer

Yuichi Yoda 要田 勇一
Personal information
- Full name: Yuichi Yoda
- Date of birth: June 25, 1977 (age 49)
- Place of birth: Hyogo, Japan
- Height: 1.75 m (5 ft 9 in)
- Position: Forward

Youth career
- 1993–1995: Kobe International University High School

Senior career*
Years	Team	Apps	(Gls)
1996–1998	Vissel Kobe	2	(0)
2000–2001	Yokohama FC	22	(5)
2001–2002	Shizuoka FC		
2003–2004	Central Kobe		
2004	Fernando la Mora		
2004–2006	JEF United Chiba	23	(4)
2007–2010	AC Nagano Parceiro	41	(32)
Total		88	(41)
Medal record
JEF United Chiba
Winner	J.League Cup	2005
Winner	J.League Cup	2006
- * Club domestic league appearances and goals

Yuichi Yoda (要田 勇一, Yoda Yuichi; born June 25, 1977) is a Japanese former football player. and current manager Nadeshiko League Div.1 club of NHK Spring Yokohama FC Seagulls.

== Playing career ==
Yoda was born in Hyogo Prefecture on June 25, 1977. After graduating from high school, he joined Japan Football League club Vissel Kobe based in his local in 1996. The club won the 2nd place in 1996 and was promoted to J1 League from 1997. However he could hardly play in the match and left the club end of 1998 season. After 1 year blank, he joined Japan Football League club Yokohama FC in 2000. The club won the champions in 2000 and was promoted to J2 League from 2001. From late 2001, he played for Regional Leagues club Shizuoka FC and Central Kobe. In 2004, he moved to Paraguayan club Fernando la Mora. In October 2004, he returned to Japan and joined JEF United Ichihara (later JEF United Chiba). He played as substitute forward. In 2007, he moved to Regional Leagues club AC Nagano Parceiro. He played as regular player and retired end of 2010 season.

== Career statistics ==
Appearances and goals by club, season and competition
Club	Season	League			Emperor's Cup		J.League Cup		Total	
Club	Season	Division	Apps	Goals	Apps	Goals	Apps	Goals	Apps	Goals
Vissel Kobe	1996	Football League	0	0	0	0	0	0	0	0
Vissel Kobe	1997	J1 League	0	0	0	0	0	0	0	0
Vissel Kobe	1998	J1 League	2	0	0	0	1	0	3	0
Yokohama FC	2000	Football League	10	3	2	0	—		12	3
Yokohama FC	2001	J2 League	12	2	0	0	1	0	13	2
Shizuoka FC	2001	Regional Leagues								
Shizuoka FC	2002	Regional Leagues								
Central Kobe	2003	Regional Leagues								
Central Kobe	2004	Regional Leagues								
JEF United Ichihara	2004	J1 League	5	2	0	0	0	0	5	2
JEF United Chiba	2005	J1 League	5	1	0	0	2	1	7	2
JEF United Chiba	2006	J1 League	13	1	1	0	6	0	20	1
AC Nagano Parceiro	2007	Regional Leagues	13	9	—		—		13	9
AC Nagano Parceiro	2008	Regional Leagues	14	13	—		—		14	13
AC Nagano Parceiro	2009	Regional Leagues	0	0	—		—		0	0
AC Nagano Parceiro	2010	Regional Leagues	14	10	—		—		14	10
Career total			88	41	3	0	10	1	101	42
