= Tomonori Tateishi =

Japanese footballer

Tomonori Tateishi 立石 智紀
Personal information
- Full name: Tomonori Tateishi
- Date of birth: April 22, 1974 (age 52)
- Place of birth: Chiba, Japan
- Height: 1.84 m (6 ft 1/2 in)
- Position: Goalkeeper

Youth career
- 1990–1992: Horikoshi High School

Senior career*
Years	Team	Apps	(Gls)
1993–2008	JEF United Chiba	103	(0)
1998	→ Avispa Fukuoka (loan)	3	(0)
Total		106	(0)
Medal record
JEF United Chiba
Winner	J.League Cup	2005
Winner	J.League Cup	2006
- * Club domestic league appearances and goals

Tomonori Tateishi (立石 智紀, Tateishi Tomonori; born April 22, 1974) is a former Japanese football player.

== Playing career ==
Tateishi was born in Chiba Prefecture on April 22, 1974. After graduating from Horikoshi High School, he joined JEF United Ichihara (later JEF United Chiba) in 1993. However he could hardly play in the match behind Kenichi Shimokawa. In 1998, he moved to Avispa Fukuoka on loan. However he could hardly play in the match behind Hideki Tsukamoto. In 1999, he returned to JEF United. Although Shimokawa left the club in 2001, he could not become a regular goalkeeper behind Ryo Kushino. In August 2005, he became a regular goalkeeper. At 2005 J.League Cup Final, the club won the penalty shootout 5–4, defeating Gamba Osaka. He saved Yasuhito Endo penalty shootout shot and was elected MVP award. Although he played as regular goalkeeper until 2007, his opportunity to play decreased behind Masahiro Okamoto in 2008 and he retired end of 2008 season.

== Career statistics ==
Appearances and goals by club, season and competition
Club	Season	League			Emperor's Cup		J.League Cup		Total	
Club	Season	Division	Apps	Goals	Apps	Goals	Apps	Goals	Apps	Goals
JEF United Ichihara	1993	J1 League	0	0	0	0	0	0	0	0
JEF United Ichihara	1994	J1 League	0	0	0	0	0	0	0	0
JEF United Ichihara	1995	J1 League	10	0	0	0	—		10	0
JEF United Ichihara	1996	J1 League	0	0	0	0	0	0	0	0
JEF United Ichihara	1997	J1 League	0	0	0	0	0	0	0	0
Avispa Fukuoka	1998	J1 League	3	0	0	0	0	0	3	0
JEF United Ichihara	1999	J1 League	0	0	0	0	2	0	2	0
JEF United Ichihara	2000	J1 League	5	0	0	0	1	0	6	0
JEF United Ichihara	2001	J1 League	8	0	3	0	0	0	11	0
JEF United Ichihara	2002	J1 League	8	0	1	0	2	0	11	0
JEF United Ichihara	2003	J1 League	0	0	0	0	0	0	0	0
JEF United Ichihara	2004	J1 League	1	0	0	0	1	0	2	0
JEF United Chiba	2005	J1 League	12	0	1	0	6	0	19	0
JEF United Chiba	2006	J1 League	21	0	0	0	1	0	22	0
JEF United Chiba	2007	J1 League	26	0	0	0	2	0	28	0
JEF United Chiba	2008	J1 League	12	0	0	0	3	0	15	0
Career total			106	0	5	0	18	0	129	0
