= 2016 SC Sagamihara season =

SC Sagamihara
2016 season
- Manager: Norihiro Satsukawa; Sotaro Yasunaga
- Stadium: Sagamihara Gion Stadium
- J3 League: 11th

2016 SC Sagamihara season.

== J3 League ==
=== League table ===
Pos	Team	Pld	W	D	L	GF	GA	GD	Pts
8	FC Ryukyu	30	12	8	10	46	46	0	44
9	Gamba Osaka U-23	30	10	8	12	42	41	+1	38
10	FC Tokyo U-23	30	9	9	12	32	31	+1	36
11	SC Sagamihara	30	9	8	13	29	46	−17	35
12	Cerezo Osaka U-23	30	8	8	14	38	47	−9	32
13	Grulla Morioka	30	6	12	12	43	47	−4	30
14	Fukushima United	30	7	9	14	35	44	−9	30

Updated to match(es) played on 20 November 2016. Source: 2016 MEIJI YASUDA J3 LEAGUE League table
Rules for classification: 1) Points; 2) Goal difference; 3) Goals scored; 4th) head-to-head results; 5th) disciplinary points; 6th) draw

=== Match details ===
J3 League match details
Match	Date	Team	Score	Team	Venue	Attendance
1	2016.03.13	SC Sagamihara	1-0	FC Tokyo U-23	Sagamihara Gion Stadium	7,280
2	2016.03.20	SC Sagamihara	0-1	YSCC Yokohama	Sagamihara Gion Stadium	2,912
3	2016.04.03	Fukushima United FC	0-1	SC Sagamihara	Toho Stadium	1,230
4	2016.04.10	SC Sagamihara	0-0	Grulla Morioka	Sagamihara Gion Stadium	2,940
6	2016.04.24	SC Sagamihara	3-1	Cerezo Osaka U-23	Sagamihara Gion Stadium	3,369
7	2016.05.01	FC Ryukyu	2-2	SC Sagamihara	Okinawa Athletic Park Stadium	1,382
8	2016.05.08	SC Sagamihara	2-2	Blaublitz Akita	Sagamihara Gion Stadium	4,873
9	2016.05.15	Fujieda MYFC	0-1	SC Sagamihara	Fujieda Soccer Stadium	1,673
10	2016.05.22	Gamba Osaka U-23	0-1	SC Sagamihara	Expo '70 Commemorative Stadium	1,515
11	2016.05.29	SC Sagamihara	1-0	Gainare Tottori	Sagamihara Gion Stadium	4,543
12	2016.06.12	Oita Trinita	3-0	SC Sagamihara	Oita Bank Dome	7,314
13	2016.06.19	SC Sagamihara	0-1	Kataller Toyama	Sagamihara Gion Stadium	5,668
14	2016.06.26	AC Nagano Parceiro	2-1	SC Sagamihara	Minami Nagano Sports Park Stadium	4,468
15	2016.07.03	SC Sagamihara	0-2	Tochigi SC	Sagamihara Gion Stadium	3,579
16	2016.07.10	Gainare Tottori	0-1	SC Sagamihara	Tottori Bank Bird Stadium	1,321
17	2016.07.16	SC Sagamihara	1-2	Gamba Osaka U-23	Sagamihara Gion Stadium	3,487
18	2016.07.24	Cerezo Osaka U-23	2-2	SC Sagamihara	Kincho Stadium	894
19	2016.07.31	SC Sagamihara	1-0	Fukushima United FC	Sagamihara Gion Stadium	3,110
20	2016.08.07	YSCC Yokohama	1-1	SC Sagamihara	NHK Spring Mitsuzawa Football Stadium	1,015
5	2016.08.13	Kagoshima United FC	1-1	SC Sagamihara	Kagoshima Kamoike Stadium	3,202
21	2016.09.11	SC Sagamihara	0-3	Oita Trinita	Sagamihara Gion Stadium	7,582
22	2016.09.18	Tochigi SC	1-1	SC Sagamihara	Tochigi Green Stadium	3,454
23	2016.09.25	SC Sagamihara	1-3	FC Ryukyu	Sagamihara Gion Stadium	2,536
24	2016.10.02	SC Sagamihara	1-2	AC Nagano Parceiro	Sagamihara Gion Stadium	3,448
25	2016.10.16	Grulla Morioka	5-0	SC Sagamihara	Iwagin Stadium	1,006
26	2016.10.23	SC Sagamihara	0-4	Kagoshima United FC	Sagamihara Gion Stadium	4,312
27	2016.10.30	FC Tokyo U-23	4-1	SC Sagamihara	Ajinomoto Field Nishigaoka	2,813
28	2016.11.06	Blaublitz Akita	2-1	SC Sagamihara	Akita Yabase Athletic Field	5,371
29	2016.11.13	SC Sagamihara	3-1	Fujieda MYFC	Sagamihara Gion Stadium	5,522
30	2016.11.20	Kataller Toyama	1-1	SC Sagamihara	Toyama Stadium	3,354
