= Daisuke Saito (footballer, born 1974) =

Japanese footballer

Daisuke Saito 斎藤 大輔
Personal information
- Full name: Daisuke Saito
- Date of birth: November 19, 1974 (age 51)
- Place of birth: Nagoya, Aichi, Japan
- Height: 1.82 m (5 ft 11 1/2 in)
- Position: Defender

Youth career
- 1993–1996: Chuo University

Senior career*
Years	Team	Apps	(Gls)
1997–1999	Gamba Osaka	63	(0)
2000–2002	Cerezo Osaka	61	(5)
2002–2009	JEF United Chiba	197	(10)
Total		321	(15)
Medal record
Cerezo Osaka
Runner-up	Emperor's Cup	2001
JEF United Chiba
Winner	J.League Cup	2005
Winner	J.League Cup	2006
- * Club domestic league appearances and goals

Daisuke Saito (斎藤 大輔, Saitō Daisuke; born November 19, 1974) is a former Japanese football player.

== Playing career ==
Saito was born in Nagoya on November 19, 1974. After graduating from Chuo University, he joined J1 League club Gamba Osaka in 1997. He became a regular player as center back from first season. However his opportunity to play decreased for injury from 1998. In 2000, he moved to across town to the Gamba Osaka rivals, Cerezo Osaka. Although he played as regular player, the club was relegated to J2 League from 2002. In May 2002, he moved to JEF United Ichihara (later JEF United Chiba). He played as center back for the club for a long time. The club won the champions 2005 and 2006 J.League Cup. His opportunity to play decreased and he also played as defensive midfielder not only center back from 2008. He retired at the end of the 2009 season.

== Career statistics ==
Appearances and goals by club, season and competition
Club	Season	League			Emperor's Cup		J.League Cup		Total	
Club	Season	Division	Apps	Goals	Apps	Goals	Apps	Goals	Apps	Goals
Gamba Osaka	1997	J1 League	31	0	3	0	3	0	37	0
Gamba Osaka	1998	J1 League	18	0	1	0	4	0	23	0
Gamba Osaka	1999	J1 League	14	0	1	0	4	0	19	0
Cerezo Osaka	2000	J1 League	27	3	2	0	3	0	32	3
Cerezo Osaka	2001	J1 League	28	2	5	0	2	0	35	2
Cerezo Osaka	2002	J2 League	6	0	0	0	—		6	0
JEF United Ichihara	2002	J1 League	18	2	4	0	0	0	22	2
JEF United Ichihara	2003	J1 League	28	1	3	0	4	0	35	1
JEF United Ichihara	2004	J1 League	25	1	1	1	5	1	31	3
JEF United Chiba	2005	J1 League	33	1	1	0	8	1	42	2
JEF United Chiba	2006	J1 League	28	1	0	0	9	0	32	1
JEF United Chiba	2007	J1 League	27	1	1	0	3	0	29	1
JEF United Chiba	2008	J1 League	24	1	1	0	8	1	33	2
JEF United Chiba	2009	J1 League	14	2	0	0	5	0	19	2
Career total			321	15	23	1	58	3	402	19

== Honors ==
JEF United Chiba

- J.League Cup : 2005, 2006
