= Masahiro Okamoto =

Japanese footballer

Masahiro Okamoto 岡本 昌弘
Personal information
- Full name: Masahiro Okamoto
- Date of birth: May 17, 1983 (age 43)
- Place of birth: Chiba, Japan
- Height: 1.88 m (6 ft 2 in)
- Position: Goalkeeper

Youth career
- 1990–1995: FC Libereo
- 1996–2001: JEF United Ichihara

Senior career*
Years	Team	Apps	(Gls)
2002–2017	JEF United Chiba	242	(0)
2007	→ JEF Reserves (loan)	8	(0)
2018–2019	→ Ehime FC (loan)	84	(0)
2020–2021	Ehime FC	37	(0)
2022–2024	Sagan Tosu	1	(0)
Medal record
JEF United Chiba
Winner	J.League Cup	2005
Winner	J.League Cup	2006
Representing Japan
AFC U-19 Championship
Silver medal – second place	2002 Qatar
- * Club domestic league appearances and goals as of 17:59, 6 January 2021 (UTC)

Masahiro Okamoto (岡本 昌弘, Okamoto Masahiro; born May 17, 1983) is a Japanese football player who plays as a goalkeeper for Sagan Tosu.

== Playing career ==
Okamoto was born in Chiba on May 17, 1983. He joined J1 League club JEF United Ichihara (later JEF United Chiba) from youth team in 2002. However he could hardly play in the match behind Ryo Kushino and Tomonori Tateishi. He got an opportunity to play from 2006 and played many matches from 2008. However the club results were sluggish and finished at the bottom place in 2009 season. JEF United was relegated to J2 League from 2010 season. Although his opportunity to play decreased behind Kushino in 2010, Okamoto became a regular goalkeeper from 2011. However he lost his position in late 2014 and his opportunity to play decreased from 2015. In 2018, he moved to Ehime FC.

== National team career ==
In November 2003, Okamoto was selected Japan U-20 national team for 2003 World Youth Championship. But he did not play in the match, as he was the team's reserve goalkeeper behind Eiji Kawashima.

== Club statistics ==
As of 1 January 2020.

Club performance			League		Cup		League Cup		Other		Total	
Season	Club	League	Apps	Goals	Apps	Goals	Apps	Goals	Apps	Goals	Apps	Goals
Japan			League		Emperor's Cup		J.League Cup		Other^{1}		Total	
2002	JEF United Ichihara	J1 League	0	0	0	0	0	0	-		0	0
2003	JEF United Ichihara	J1 League	0	0	0	0	1	0	-		1	0
2004	JEF United Ichihara	J1 League	0	0	0	0	0	0	-		0	0
2005	JEF United Chiba	J1 League	0	0	0	0	0	0	-		0	0
2006	JEF United Chiba	J1 League	13	0	1	0	2	0	1	0	17	0
2007	JEF United Chiba	J1 League	8	0	1	0	4	0	-		13	0
2008	JEF United Chiba	J1 League	21	0	0	0	4	0	-		25	0
2009	JEF United Chiba	J1 League	23	0	3	0	4	0	-		30	0
2010	JEF United Chiba	J2 League	14	0	2	0	-		-		16	0
2011	JEF United Chiba	J2 League	38	0	2	0	-		-		40	0
2012	JEF United Chiba	J2 League	34	0	3	0	-		2	0	39	0
2013	JEF United Chiba	J2 League	42	0	1	0	-		1	0	44	0
2014	JEF United Chiba	J2 League	33	0	1	0	-		-		34	0
2015	JEF United Chiba	J2 League	11	0	3	0	-		-		14	0
2016	JEF United Chiba	J2 League	5	0	2	0	-		-		7	0
2017	JEF United Chiba	J2 League	0	0	0	0	-		-		0	0
Total			242	0	19	0	15	0	4	0	280	0
2018	Ehime FC	J2 League	42	0	0	0	-		-		42	0
2019	Ehime FC	J2 League	42	0	0	0	-		-		42	0
Total			84	0	0	0	-		-		84	0
Career total			326	0	19	0	15	0	4	0	364	0

^{1}Includes A3 Champions Cup and Promotion Playoffs to J1.

== Honors and awards ==
Team

- J.League Cup Champion: 2005, 2006
