= Taisuke Matsugae =

Japanese footballer (born 1982)

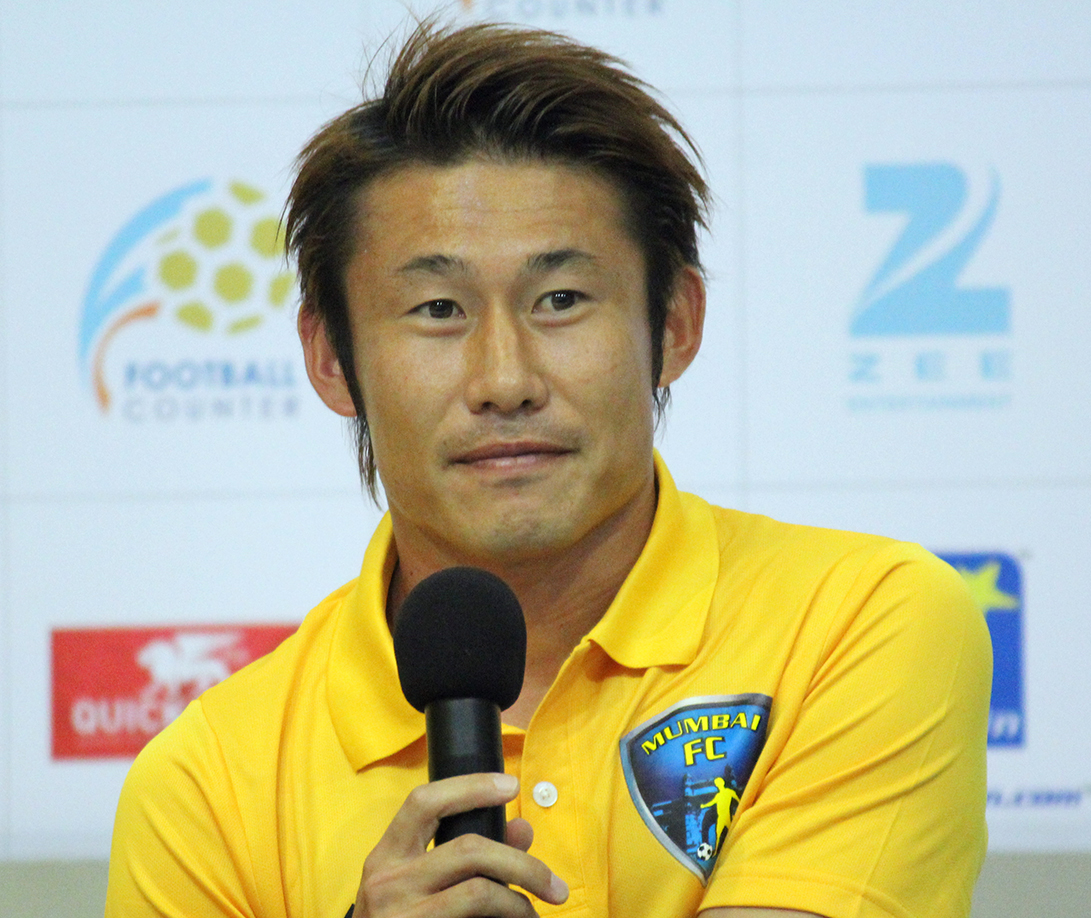
- Matsugae with Mumbai at a press conference in 2016

Personal information
- Full name: Taisuke Matsugae
- Date of birth: 15 December 1982 (age 43)
- Place of birth: Kagawa, Japan
- Height: 1.73 m (5 ft 8 in)
- Position: Midfielder

Youth career
- 2001–2004: Meiji University

Senior career*
Years	Team	Apps	(Gls)
2005–2006	JEF United Chiba	0	(0)
2006	JEF Reserves	3	(0)
2007–2012	TDK/Blaublitz Akita	150	(20)
2013–2014	Shillong Lajong	31	(4)
2014–2016	Mumbai	26	(3)
2018	Shinagawa CC Yokohama		
Total		210	(27)

Managerial career
- 2019-: Shinagawa CC Yokohama
Medal record
JEF United Chiba
Winner	J.League Cup	2005
Winner	J.League Cup	2006
- * Club domestic league appearances and goals

Taisuke Matsugae (松ヶ枝 泰介, Matsugae Taisuke; born 15 December 1982) is a Japanese football player. He played as a midfielder, most recently for Mumbai in the Indian I-League.

== Career ==
=== JEF United Chiba ===
From 2005 to 2006 Matsugae was a squad player for JEF United Chiba in the J1 League but could not see any playing time during his time at the club.

=== TDK/Blaublitz Akita ===
In 2007 Matsugae joined TDK/Blaublitz Akita who played in the Japan Football League. He stayed at the club from 2007 to 2012 in which he played in 150 league matches and scored 20 goals in his time at the club.

=== Shillong Lajong ===
On 17 January 2013 it was announced that Matsugae had joined Shillong Lajong F.C. on trial for two weeks. Despite him being only on trial and not signing a contract yet Matsugae made his debut for Shillong Lajong in the I-League on 20 January 2013 coming on as a substitute for Pailan Arrows in which Shillong Lajong lost the match 1–0. On 2 February he scored debut his goal for Shillong Lajong against United Sikkim F.C. in I-League

=== Mumbai FC ===
Taisuke will represent Mumbai FC for the 2014–15 I-League
