= 2012 JEF United Chiba season =

JEF United Chiba
2012 season
- Manager: Takashi Kiyama
- Stadium: Fukuda Denshi Arena
- J2 League: 5 th

2012 JEF United Chiba season.

== J2 League ==
Match	Date	Team	Score	Team	Venue	Attendance
1	2012.03.04	JEF United Chiba	2-0	Montedio Yamagata	Fukuda Denshi Arena	11,479
2	2012.03.11	Kyoto Sanga FC	2-0	JEF United Chiba	Kyoto Nishikyogoku Athletic Stadium	8,003
3	2012.03.17	JEF United Chiba	3-0	Yokohama FC	Fukuda Denshi Arena	6,959
4	2012.03.20	Avispa Fukuoka	0-0	JEF United Chiba	Level5 Stadium	5,069
5	2012.03.25	JEF United Chiba	3-0	Tokushima Vortis	Fukuda Denshi Arena	8,337
6	2012.04.01	Tochigi SC	2-1	JEF United Chiba	Tochigi Green Stadium	4,769
7	2012.04.08	Mito HollyHock	0-1	JEF United Chiba	K's denki Stadium Mito	5,373
8	2012.04.15	JEF United Chiba	0-0	Fagiano Okayama	Fukuda Denshi Arena	9,056
9	2012.04.22	Matsumoto Yamaga FC	1-0	JEF United Chiba	Matsumotodaira Park Stadium	6,740
10	2012.04.27	JEF United Chiba	1-1	Kataller Toyama	Fukuda Denshi Arena	6,235
11	2012.04.30	Giravanz Kitakyushu	1-2	JEF United Chiba	Honjo Stadium	2,112
12	2012.05.03	Thespa Kusatsu	0-2	JEF United Chiba	Shoda Shoyu Stadium Gunma	3,260
13	2012.05.06	JEF United Chiba	1-0	Ehime FC	Fukuda Denshi Arena	10,967
14	2012.05.13	FC Machida Zelvia	1-6	JEF United Chiba	Machida Stadium	6,173
15	2012.05.20	JEF United Chiba	4-0	Roasso Kumamoto	Fukuda Denshi Arena	10,584
16	2012.05.27	Oita Trinita	0-2	JEF United Chiba	Oita Bank Dome	10,747
17	2012.06.02	JEF United Chiba	0-1	FC Gifu	Fukuda Denshi Arena	10,377
18	2012.06.09	Ventforet Kofu	0-2	JEF United Chiba	Yamanashi Chuo Bank Stadium	10,773
19	2012.06.13	JEF United Chiba	3-1	Gainare Tottori	Fukuda Denshi Arena	7,309
20	2012.06.17	Tokyo Verdy	2-1	JEF United Chiba	Ajinomoto Stadium	6,933
21	2012.06.24	JEF United Chiba	1-1	Shonan Bellmare	Fukuda Denshi Arena	9,549
22	2012.07.01	Roasso Kumamoto	1-0	JEF United Chiba	Kumamoto Athletics Stadium	4,326
23	2012.07.08	JEF United Chiba	3-2	Kyoto Sanga FC	Fukuda Denshi Arena	8,657
24	2012.07.15	Yokohama FC	0-1	JEF United Chiba	NHK Spring Mitsuzawa Football Stadium	8,547
25	2012.07.22	JEF United Chiba	0-1	Ventforet Kofu	Fukuda Denshi Arena	11,508
26	2012.07.29	Fagiano Okayama	0-1	JEF United Chiba	Kanko Stadium	7,970
27	2012.08.05	JEF United Chiba	0-0	Tochigi SC	Fukuda Denshi Arena	8,607
28	2012.08.12	JEF United Chiba	0-1	FC Machida Zelvia	Fukuda Denshi Arena	9,071
29	2012.08.19	Gainare Tottori	2-1	JEF United Chiba	Tottori Bank Bird Stadium	3,263
30	2012.08.22	FC Gifu	0-0	JEF United Chiba	Gifu Nagaragawa Stadium	3,932
31	2012.08.26	JEF United Chiba	3-0	Mito HollyHock	Fukuda Denshi Arena	7,811
32	2012.09.02	JEF United Chiba	2-1	Avispa Fukuoka	Fukuda Denshi Arena	7,194
33	2012.09.14	Kataller Toyama	2-0	JEF United Chiba	Toyama Stadium	3,161
34	2012.09.17	JEF United Chiba	0-3	Giravanz Kitakyushu	Fukuda Denshi Arena	7,845
35	2012.09.23	JEF United Chiba	2-2	Tokyo Verdy	Fukuda Denshi Arena	8,514
36	2012.09.30	Ehime FC	2-2	JEF United Chiba	Ningineer Stadium	2,792
37	2012.10.07	JEF United Chiba	2-0	Thespa Kusatsu	Fukuda Denshi Arena	8,381
38	2012.10.14	JEF United Chiba	1-2	Oita Trinita	Fukuda Denshi Arena	11,966
39	2012.10.21	Shonan Bellmare	1-1	JEF United Chiba	Shonan BMW Stadium Hiratsuka	10,918
40	2012.10.28	Montedio Yamagata	0-2	JEF United Chiba	ND Soft Stadium Yamagata	7,143
41	2012.11.04	JEF United Chiba	2-0	Matsumoto Yamaga FC	Fukuda Denshi Arena	14,487
42	2012.11.11	Tokushima Vortis	0-3	JEF United Chiba	Pocarisweat Stadium	3,461
