= 2011 JEF United Chiba season =

JEF United Chiba
2011 season
- Manager: Dwight Lodeweges; Sugao Kambe
- Stadium: Fukuda Denshi Arena
- J2 League: 6 th

2011 JEF United Chiba season.

== J2 League ==
Match	Date	Team	Score	Team	Venue	Attendance
1	2011.03.06	Giravanz Kitakyushu	0-3	JEF United Chiba	Honjo Stadium	3,359
8	2011.04.24	JEF United Chiba	3-0	FC Tokyo	Fukuda Denshi Arena	16,360
9	2011.04.30	Tokushima Vortis	1-0	JEF United Chiba	Pocarisweat Stadium	4,462
10	2011.05.04	JEF United Chiba	2-1	Ehime FC	Fukuda Denshi Arena	11,834
11	2011.05.08	Gainare Tottori	0-1	JEF United Chiba	Tottori Bank Bird Stadium	3,560
12	2011.05.15	JEF United Chiba	2-1	Fagiano Okayama	Fukuda Denshi Arena	10,330
13	2011.05.21	Roasso Kumamoto	1-1	JEF United Chiba	Kumamoto Suizenji Stadium	4,349
14	2011.05.29	JEF United Chiba	3-2	Oita Trinita	Fukuda Denshi Arena	7,216
15	2011.06.04	Thespa Kusatsu	3-1	JEF United Chiba	Shoda Shoyu Stadium Gunma	6,054
16	2011.06.12	JEF United Chiba	3-1	FC Gifu	Fukuda Denshi Arena	8,802
17	2011.06.19	Yokohama FC	1-1	JEF United Chiba	NHK Spring Mitsuzawa Football Stadium	7,012
18	2011.06.26	JEF United Chiba	2-2	Tochigi SC	Fukuda Denshi Arena	9,611
2	2011.06.29	JEF United Chiba	2-0	Shonan Bellmare	Fukuda Denshi Arena	9,228
19	2011.07.03	Kataller Toyama	1-2	JEF United Chiba	Kataller Toyama	3,529
20	2011.07.09	JEF United Chiba	1-1	Roasso Kumamoto	Fukuda Denshi Arena	9,646
21	2011.07.17	Shonan Bellmare	2-0	JEF United Chiba	Hiratsuka Stadium	9,340
22	2011.07.23	JEF United Chiba	2-0	Consadole Sapporo	Fukuda Denshi Arena	10,989
23	2011.07.31	JEF United Chiba	1-1	Yokohama FC	Fukuda Denshi Arena	13,602
24	2011.08.13	FC Gifu	0-2	JEF United Chiba	Gifu Nagaragawa Stadium	4,842
3	2011.08.17	Consadole Sapporo	4-0	JEF United Chiba	Sapporo Dome	11,765
25	2011.08.21	JEF United Chiba	0-0	Kataller Toyama	Fukuda Denshi Arena	8,445
26	2011.08.27	Kyoto Sanga FC	2-1	JEF United Chiba	Kyoto Nishikyogoku Athletic Stadium	8,765
4	2011.09.04	JEF United Chiba	1-1	Tokyo Verdy	Fukuda Denshi Arena	8,826
27	2011.09.10	JEF United Chiba	3-3	Sagan Tosu	Fukuda Denshi Arena	8,680
28	2011.09.17	Fagiano Okayama	0-1	JEF United Chiba	Kanko Stadium	6,305
29	2011.09.25	JEF United Chiba	1-0	Giravanz Kitakyushu	Fukuda Denshi Arena	8,969
5	2011.09.28	JEF United Chiba	0-1	Kyoto Sanga FC	Fukuda Denshi Arena	6,955
30	2011.10.02	Ehime FC	0-1	JEF United Chiba	Ningineer Stadium	3,246
31	2011.10.16	JEF United Chiba	2-3	Thespa Kusatsu	Fukuda Denshi Arena	8,902
6	2011.10.19	Mito HollyHock	1-0	JEF United Chiba	K's denki Stadium Mito	2,155
32	2011.10.23	Tochigi SC	0-0	JEF United Chiba	Tochigi Green Stadium	5,998
7	2011.10.26	Sagan Tosu	1-0	JEF United Chiba	Best Amenity Stadium	6,924
33	2011.10.30	JEF United Chiba	0-1	Tokushima Vortis	Fukuda Denshi Arena	10,015
34	2011.11.06	Oita Trinita	1-1	JEF United Chiba	Oita Bank Dome	9,589
35	2011.11.12	JEF United Chiba	1-0	Gainare Tottori	Fukuda Denshi Arena	8,038
36	2011.11.20	Tokyo Verdy	1-0	JEF United Chiba	Ajinomoto Stadium	11,641
37	2011.11.26	FC Tokyo	1-0	JEF United Chiba	Ajinomoto Stadium	24,241
38	2011.12.03	JEF United Chiba	2-1	Mito HollyHock	Fukuda Denshi Arena	7,463
