= Transcosmos Stadium Nagasaki =

Japanese sports stadium

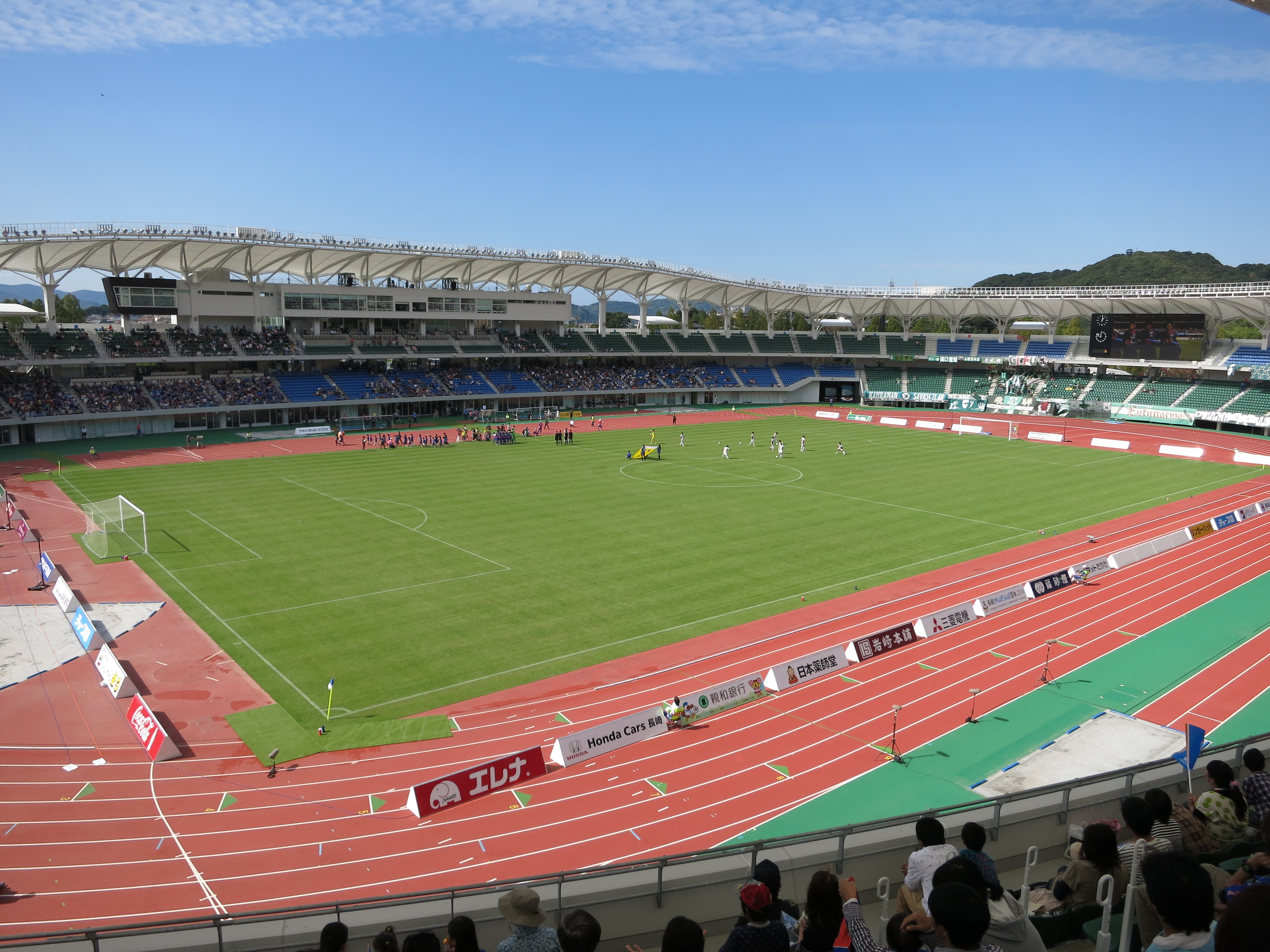
- Interactive map of Transcosmos Stadium Nagasaki
- Former names: Nagasaki Stadium (1969–2016)
- Location: Isahaya, Nagasaki, Japan
- Coordinates: 32°50′19″N 130°02′22″E
- Owner: Nagasaki Prefecture
- Capacity: 20,246
- Surface: Grass
- Scoreboard: Diamond Vision
- Field size: 105 x 68 m

Construction
- Opened: 1969
- Renovated: 2013

Tenant
- V-Varen Nagasaki (2013–2024)

Transcosmos Stadium Nagasaki (トランスコスモススタジアム長崎) is an athletic stadium in Isahaya, Nagasaki, Japan, a.k.a. Nagasaki Athletic Stadium, it received its current name in August 2016 due to naming rights.

The stadium is primarily used for football, and was the former home stadium of the J. League football club V-Varen Nagasaki until September 2024.

== Access ==
- JR Kyushu Nagasaki Main Line: 20 minutes walk from Isahaya Station.
