= 2006 J.League Cup =

J.League Yamazaki Nabisco Cup

Tournament details
- Country: Japan
- Dates: March 29 and November 3

Final positions
- Champions: JEF United Chiba (2nd title)
- Runners-up: Kashima Antlers
- Semifinalists: Yokohama F. Marinos; Kawasaki Frontale

The 2006 edition of the J.League Cup, officially the 2006 J.League Yamazaki Nabisco Cup was sponsored by Nabisco. First-round matches were held from March 29 through May 21. Gamba Osaka were exempt from competing in the group stage, due to their entry into the Asian Champions League. They were therefore entered into the quarter-final stage.

The final was on November 3 at the Tokyo National Stadium. The winners were JEF United Ichihara Chiba, beating Kashima Antlers in the final 2–0 to claim its second J.League Cup.

== Group stage ==
=== Group A ===
Team	Pld	W	D	L	GF	GA	GD	Pts
Urawa Red Diamonds	6	5	1	0	14	5	+9	16
Yokohama F. Marinos	6	3	1	2	9	8	+1	10
Avispa Fukuoka	6	1	2	3	5	8	−3	5
F.C. Tokyo	6	0	2	4	1	7	−6	2

2006-03-29
Urawa Red Diamonds	2–0	F.C. Tokyo
Yokohama F. Marinos	1–0	Avispa Fukuoka
2006-04-12
Urawa Red Diamonds	3–1	Avispa Fukuoka
Yokohama F. Marinos	2–0	F.C. Tokyo
2006-04-26
F.C. Tokyo	1–2	Yokohama F. Marinos
Avispa Fukuoka	1–3	Urawa Red Diamonds
2006-05-14
F.C. Tokyo	0–1	Avispa Fukuoka
Yokohama F. Marinos	1–2	Urawa Red Diamonds
2006-05-17
F.C. Tokyo	0–0	Urawa Red Diamonds
Avispa Fukuoka	1–1	Yokohama F. Marinos
2006-05-21
Urawa Red Diamonds	4–2	Yokohama F. Marinos
Avispa Fukuoka	0–0	F.C. Tokyo

=== Group B ===
Team	Pld	W	D	L	GF	GA	GD	Pts
Kawasaki Frontale	6	5	0	1	14	8	+6	15
Kashima Antlers	6	3	0	3	12	9	+3	9
Ōita Trinita	6	3	0	3	6	9	−3	9
Kyoto Purple Sanga	6	1	0	5	10	16	−6	3

2009-03-29
Kashima Antlers	4–1	Ōita Trinita
Kyoto Purple Sanga	3–4	Kawasaki Frontale
2009-04-12
Kashima Antlers	3–1	Kawasaki Frontale
Ōita Trinita	2–1	Kyoto Purple Sanga
2009-04-26
Kawasaki Frontale	4–1	Kyoto Purple Sanga
Ōita Trinita	1–0	Kashima Antlers
2009-05-14
Kashima Antlers	3–2	Kyoto Purple Sanga
Ōita Trinita	0–2	Kawasaki Frontale
2009-05-17
Kawasaki Frontale	1–0	Ōita Trinita
Kyoto Purple Sanga	2–1	Kashima Antlers
2009-05-21
Kawasaki Frontale	2–1	Kashima Antlers
Kyoto Purple Sanga	1–2	Ōita Trinita

=== Group C ===
Team	Pld	W	D	L	GF	GA	GD	Pts
JEF United Chiba	6	4	1	1	10	7	+3	13
Shimizu S-Pulse	6	2	2	2	8	8	0	8
Albirex Niigata	6	1	3	2	7	8	−1	6
Sanfrecce Hiroshima	6	1	2	3	7	9	−2	5

2006-03-29
JEF United Chiba	2–1	Sanfrecce Hiroshima
Albirex Niigata	3–3	Shimizu S-Pulse
2006-04-12
JEF United Chiba	3–2	Albirex Niigata
Shimizu S-Pulse	2–2	Sanfrecce Hiroshima
2006-04-26
Shimizu S-Pulse	1–2	Albirex Niigata
Sanfrecce Hiroshima	3–4	JEF United Chiba
2006-05-14
Shimizu S-Pulse	1–0	JEF United Chiba
Sanfrecce Hiroshima	0–0	Albirex Niigata
2006-05-17
Sanfrecce Hiroshima	0–1	Shimizu S-Pulse
2006-05-18
Albirex Niigata	0–0	JEF United Chiba
2006-05-21
JEF United Chiba	1–0	Shimizu S-Pulse
Albirex Niigata	0–1	Sanfrecce Hiroshima

=== Group D ===
Team	Pld	W	D	L	GF	GA	GD	Pts
Cerezo Osaka	6	3	3	0	8	5	+3	12
Júbilo Iwata	6	3	1	2	10	9	+1	10
Ventforet Kofu	6	2	2	2	8	7	+1	8
Omiya Ardija	6	2	1	3	9	10	−1	7
Nagoya Grampus Eight	6	0	3	3	6	10	−4	3

2006-03-29
Nagoya Grampus Eight	1–3	Ventforet Kofu
Cerezo Osaka	1–0	Júbilo Iwata
2006-04-05
Júbilo Iwata	2–1	Omiya Ardija
2006-04-12
Ventforet Kofu	2–2	Júbilo Iwata
Cerezo Osaka	1–1	Nagoya Grampus Eight
2006-04-26
Omiya Ardija	2–3	Júbilo Iwata
Ventforet Kofu	1–1	Nagoya Grampus Eight
2006-05-10
Ventforet Kofu	0–1	Cerezo Osaka
Nagoya Grampus Eight	1–2	Omiya Ardija
2006-05-14
Omiya Ardija	1–0	Ventforet Kofu
Nagoya Grampus Eight	1–1	Cerezo Osaka
2006-05-17
Omiya Ardija	1–1	Cerezo Osaka
2006-05-18
Júbilo Iwata	1–2	Ventforet Kofu
2006-05-21
Júbilo Iwata	2–1	Nagoya Grampus Eight
Cerezo Osaka	3–2	Omiya Ardija

=== Runner-up qualifiers ===
Team	Pld	W	D	L	GF	GA	GD	Pts
Júbilo Iwata	6	3	1	2	10	9	+1	10
Yokohama F. Marinos	6	3	1	2	9	8	+1	10
Kashima Antlers	6	3	0	3	12	9	+3	9
Shimizu S-Pulse	6	2	2	2	8	8	0	8

== Knockout stage ==
Quarterfinals
Urawa Red Diamonds	4	1	5
Kawasaki Frontale	3	2	5
Cerezo Osaka	2	2	4
JEF United Chiba	5	3	8
Yokohama F. Marinos	2	2	4
Júbilo Iwata	1	0	1
Kashima Antlers	0	2	2
Gamba Osaka	0	0	0

Semifinals
Kawasaki Frontale	2	2	4
JEF United Chiba	2	3	5
Yokohama F. Marinos	0	2	2
Kashima Antlers	1	1	2

Finals
JEF United Chiba
Kashima Antlers

=== Quarter finals ===
==== First leg ====
2006-06-03

Urawa Red Diamonds	4–3	Kawasaki Frontale

Urawa Komaba Stadium, Saitama

2006-06-03

Yokohama F. Marinos	2–1	Júbilo Iwata

Nissan Stadium, Yokohama

2006-06-04

Cerezo Osaka	2–5	JEF United Chiba

Nagai Stadium, Osaka

2006-06-04

Kashima Antlers	0–0	Gamba Osaka

Kashima Soccer Stadium, Kashima

==== Second leg ====
2006-06-07

Kawasaki Frontale	2–1	Urawa Red Diamonds

Todoroki Athletics Stadium, Kawasaki

Kawasaki Frontale advances to the semi-finals on Away goals rule.

2006-06-08

Júbilo Iwata	0–2	Yokohama F. Marinos

Yamaha Stadium, Iwata

2006-06-08

JEF United Chiba	3–2	Cerezo Osaka

Fukuda Denshi Arena, Chiba

2006-06-08

Gamba Osaka	0–2	Kashima Antlers

Osaka Expo '70 Stadium, Suita

=== Semi finals ===
==== First leg ====
2006-09-02

Kashima Antlers	1–0	Yokohama F. Marinos

Kashima Soccer Stadium, Kashima

2006-09-03

Kawasaki Frontale	2–2	JEF United Chiba

Todoroki Athletics Stadium, Kawasaki

==== Second leg ====
2006-09-20

Yokohama F. Marinos	2–1	Kashima Antlers

Nissan Stadium, Yokohama

Kashima Antlers advances to the finals on Away goals rule.

2006-09-20

JEF United Chiba	3–2 (a.e.t.)	Kawasaki Frontale

Fukuda Denshi Arena, Chiba

=== Final ===
2006-11-03
14:09

Kashima Antlers	0–2	JEF United Chiba
		Mizuno 80'; Abe 82'

National Stadium, Tokyo
Attendance: 44,704

== Awards ==
- MVP: (Japan) Koki Mizuno (JEF United Chiba)
- Top Scorer: (Brazil) Washington (Urawa Red Diamonds), 9 goals
- New Hero Prize: (Japan) Hiroyuki Taniguchi (Kawasaki Frontale)

== See also ==
- 2006 J.League Division 1
- 2006 J.League Division 2
- 2006 Emperor's Cup
