= Fukuda Denshi Arena =

Football stadium in Chiba, Japan

- Fukuari
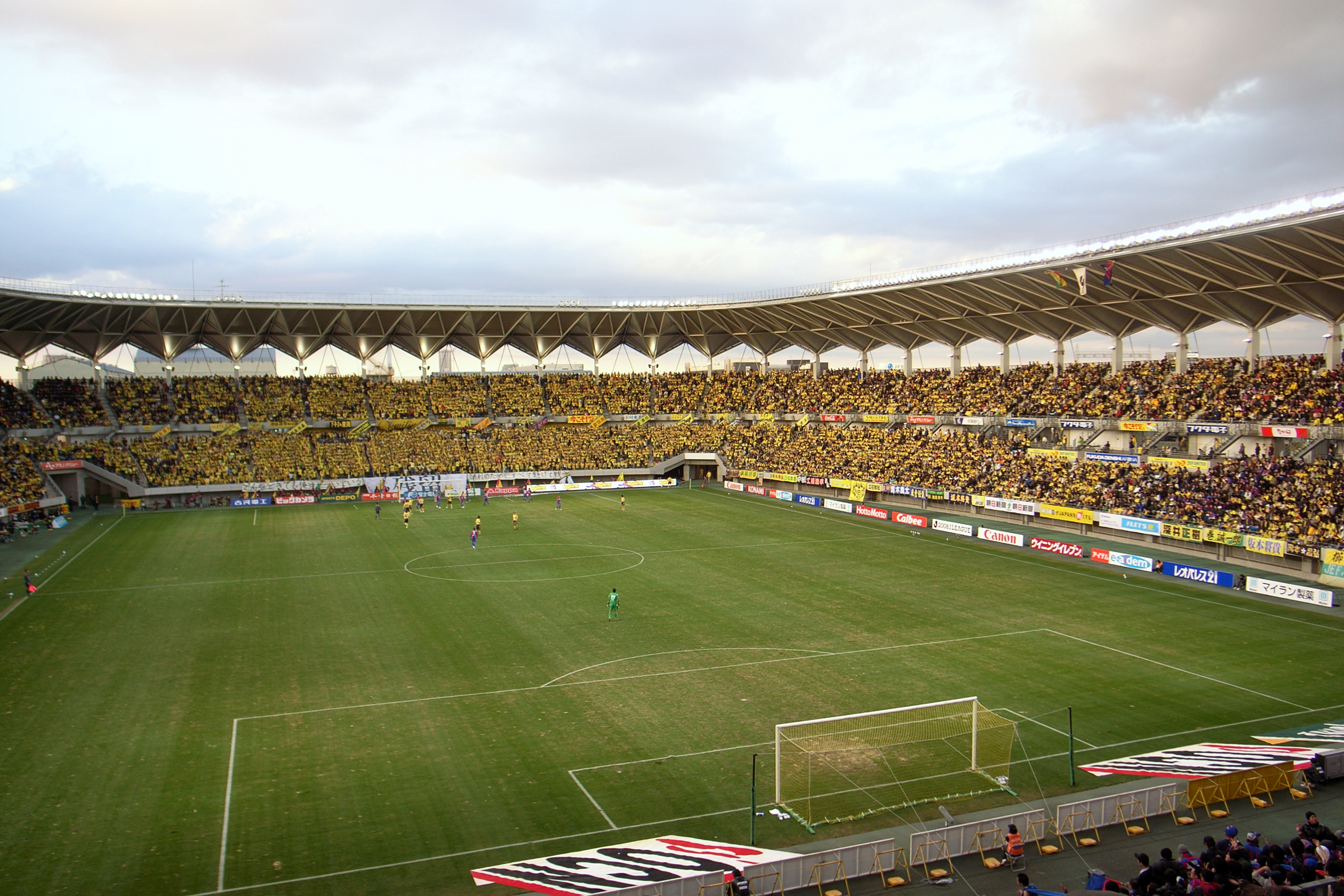
- Interactive map of Fukuda Denshi Arena
- Location: 1-20 Kawasaki-cho, Chūō-ku, Chiba, Chiba, Japan
- Coordinates: 35°34′39″N 140°07′22″E
- Owner: Chiba City
- Operator: Shimizu-group & Toyo Gleen
- Capacity: 19,781 (football)
- Surface: Grass
- Scoreboard: Diamond Vision
- Field size: 105 x 68 m
- Public transit: JR East: Sotobō Line, Uchibō Line and Keiyō Line at Soga

Construction
- Groundbreaking: 2005; 21 years ago
- Opened: 2005; 21 years ago
- Cost: 8,000 million yen (JPY) $ 68.7 million £ 36.4 million € 54 million
- Architect: Nihonsekkei

Tenant
- JEF United Ichihara Chiba

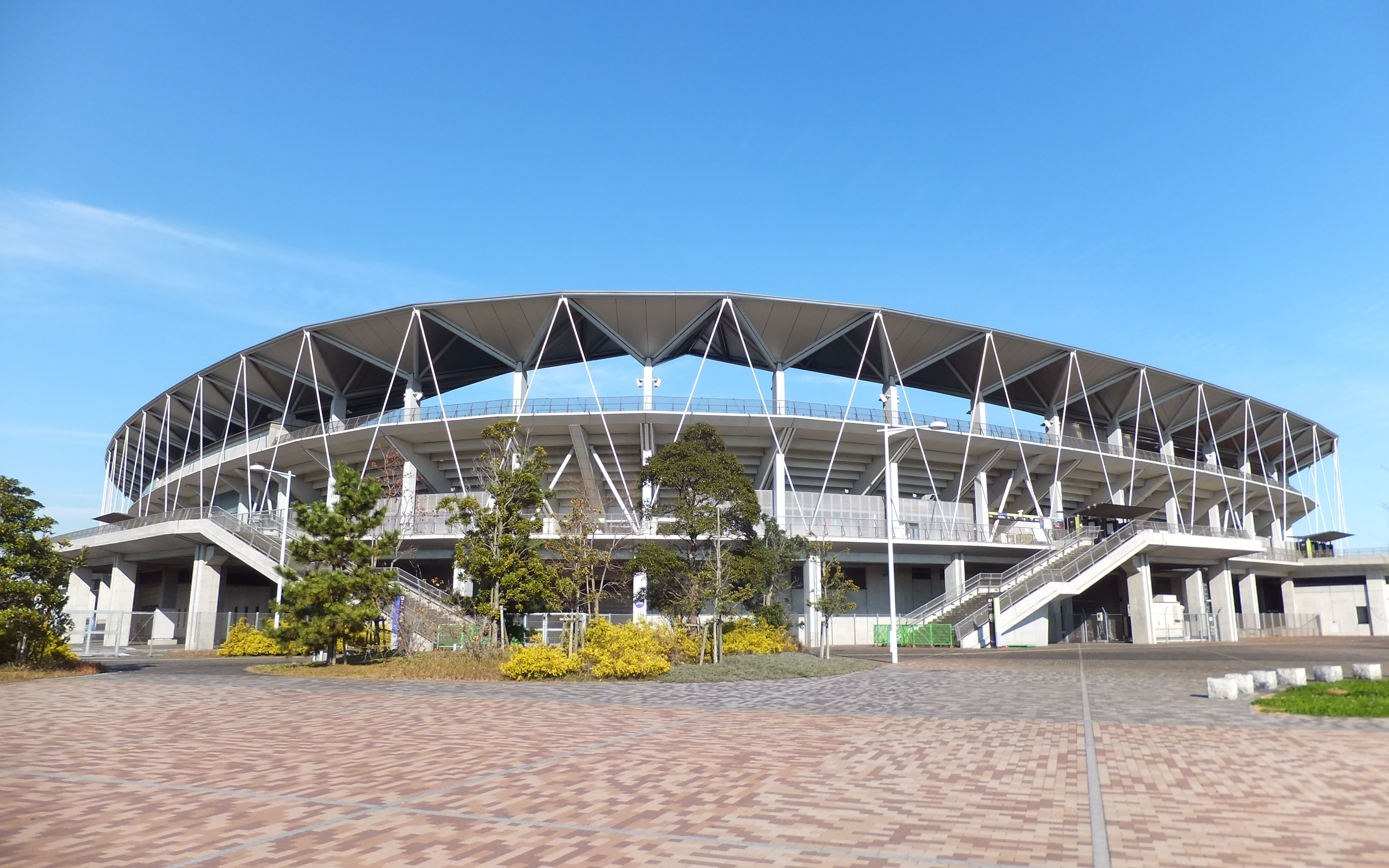
exterior of Fukuda Denshi Arena (Dec 10, 2011)

Fukuda Denshi Arena (フクダ電子アリーナ, Fukuda Denshi Ariina), a.k.a. the Fuku-Ari (フクアリ), is a football stadium in Chiba, Japan. It was completed in 2005 and is home to the J. League club JEF United Ichihara Chiba following their move from the Ichihara Seaside Stadium. The stadium has a capacity for 19,781 spectators, with 18,500 seats.

Originally named Chiba Soga Football Stadium (千葉市蘇我球技場, Chiba-shi Soga Kyūgijō), Fukuda Denshi, a medical electric instrument manufacturer, won the naming rights after outbidding several other candidates.

The location is a former Kawasaki Steel factory site.

The first international match was held on 29 May 2009, when the men's national teams of Belgium and Chile played out a 1–1 draw.
