= Seiichiro Maki =

Japanese footballer (born 1980)

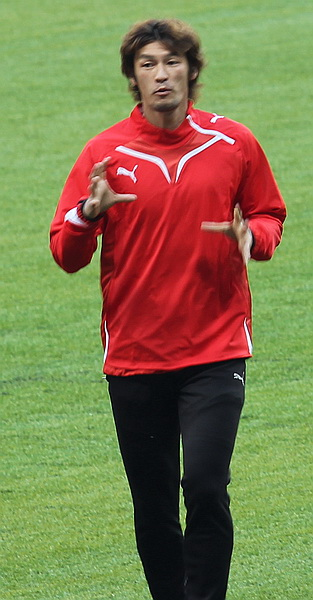

Personal information
- Full name: Seiichiro Maki
- Date of birth: 7 August 1980 (age 46)
- Place of birth: Uki, Kumamoto, Japan
- Height: 1.84 m (6 ft 0 in)
- Position: Forward

Youth career
- 1996–1998: Ohzu High School

College career
Years	Team	Apps	(Gls)
1999–2002	Komazawa University		

Senior career*
Years	Team	Apps	(Gls)
2003–2010	JEF United Chiba	220	(53)
2010	Amkar Perm	9	(0)
2011	Shenzhen Ruby	4	(0)
2011–2013	Tokyo Verdy	51	(7)
2014–2018	Roasso Kumamoto	167	(9)
Total		451	(69)

International career
2005–2009	Japan	38	(8)
Medal record
JEF United Chiba
Winner	J.League Cup	2005
Winner	J.League Cup	2006
- * Club domestic league appearances and goals

Seiichiro Maki (巻 誠一郎, Maki Seiichirō; born 7 August 1980) is a Japanese former professional footballer who played as a forward. He played for the Japan national team.

== Club career ==
Maki was a key player for Komazawa University in Tokyo along with Masaki Fukai. After graduating from Komazawa University in 2003, Maki joined JEF United Ichihara (later JEF United Chiba). He made his first professional appearance on 22 March 2003 against Tokyo Verdy. He scored his first professional goal on 2 August 2003 against Urawa Reds. For his first year at JEF, he was often used as a second-half substitute. However, in 2005 he became a starting forward for the team. JEF won the champions in 2005 and 2006 J.League Cup. However many players left the club and the club results were sluggish late 2000s. JEF finished at the bottom place in 2009 season and was relegated to J2 League first time in the club history. His opportunity to play decreased for generational change in 2010.

In July 2010, Maki moved to Russian Premier League club FC Amkar Perm. In March 2011, he moved to Chinese Super League club Shenzhen Ruby. However he could not play many matches in both clubs. In August 2011, he returned to Japan and signed with J2 League club Tokyo Verdy. He played many matches as mainly substitute forward in three seasons. In 2014, he moved to his local club Roasso Kumamoto. He played more than 30 matches as mainly substitute forward every season. However his opportunity to play decreased in 2018 and Roasso was relegated to J3 League end of 2018 season. He retired end of 2018 season.

== International career ==
Maki represented Japan in the 2001 Summer Universiade in Beijing, contributing to their championship win by scoring 3 goals in the tournament.

In July 2005, Maki was selected Japan national team for 2005 East Asian Football Championship. At this tournament, he debuted against North Korea on 31 July. In 2006, he was selected for Japan's World Cup squad and started a match against Brazil. He was a member of the Japan team for the 2007 Asian Cup finals and played four games. He scored two goals in the tournament, both against Vietnam. He played 38 games and scored 8 goals for Japan until 2009.

== Personal life ==
Maki married former actress Tomoko Kitagawa (ja) in June 2007. His younger brother Yuki is also a former footballer. His younger sister Karina is a former handball player.

== Career statistics ==
=== Club ===
Appearances and goals by club, season and competition
Club	Season	League		Cup		League Cup		Continental (Note: Includes A3 Champions Cup)		Total	
Club	Season	Apps	Goals	Apps	Goals	Apps	Goals	Apps	Goals	Apps	Goals
Ozu High School	1998	–		1	0	–		–		1	0
Komazawa University	2001	–		2	0	–		–		2	0
Komazawa University	2002	–		2	1	–		–		2	1
JEF United Ichihara	2003	17	2	3	1	4	0	–		24	3
JEF United Ichihara	2004	30	6	1	0	5	4	–		36	10
JEF United Chiba	2005	33	12	2	1	10	4	–		45	17
JEF United Chiba	2006	32	12	1	0	5	3	3	2	41	17
JEF United Chiba	2007	34	5	1	0	6	0	–		41	5
JEF United Chiba	2008	30	11	0	0	3	0	–		33	11
JEF United Chiba	2009	31	5	3	1	5	1	–		39	7
JEF United Chiba	2010	13	0	0	0	–		–		13	0
Amkar Perm	2010	9	0	0	0	–		–		9	0
Shenzhen Ruby	2011	4	0	0	0	–		–		4	0
Tokyo Verdy	2011	14	3	2	0	–		–		16	3
Tokyo Verdy	2012	18	1	0	0	–		–		18	1
Tokyo Verdy	2013	19	3	2	2	–"|–		–		21	5
Roasso Kumamoto	2014	38	2	1	0	–		–		39	2
Roasso Kumamoto	2015	39	3	2	0	–		–		41	3
Roasso Kumamoto	2016	35	0	0	0	–		–		35	0
Roasso Kumamoto	2017	30	3	2	0	–		–		32	3
Roasso Kumamoto	2018	25	1	1	0	–		–		26	1
Career total		451	69	26	6	38	12	3	2	518	89

=== International ===
Appearances and goals by national team and year
National team	Year	Apps	Goals
Japan	2005	3	0
Japan	2006	14	3
Japan	2007	9	4
Japan	2008	9	1
Japan	2009	3	0
Total		38	8

Scores and results list Japan's goal tally first, score column indicates score after each Maki goal.

List of international goals scored by Seiichiro Maki
No.	Date	Venue	Opponent	Score	Result	Competition
1	10 February 2006	SBC Park, San Francisco, USA	United States	1–3	2–3	Friendly
2	22 February 2006	International Stadium Yokohama, Japan	India	2–0	6–0	2007 AFC Asian Cup qualification
3	9 May 2006	Nagai Stadium, Osaka, Japan	Bulgaria	1–1	1–2	2006 Kirin Cup
4	24 March 2007	International Stadium Yokohama, Japan	Peru	1–0	2–0	Friendly (2007 Kirin Challenge Cup)
5	16 July 2007	Mỹ Đình National Stadium, Hanoi, Vietnam	Vietnam	1–1	4–1	2007 AFC Asian Cup
6	16 July 2007	Mỹ Đình National Stadium, Hanoi, Vietnam	Vietnam	4–1	4–1	2007 AFC Asian Cup
7	11 November 2007	Hypo-Arena, Klagenfurt, Austria	Switzerland	2–2	4–3	Friendly
8	6 February 2008	Saitama Stadium 2002, Saitama, Japan	Thailand	4–1	4–1	2010 FIFA World Cup qualification
