= Minoru Suganuma =

Japanese footballer

Minoru Suganuma 菅沼 実
Personal information
- Full name: Minoru Suganuma
- Date of birth: May 16, 1985 (age 41)
- Place of birth: Saitama, Japan
- Height: 1.73 m (5 ft 8 in)
- Position: Midfielder

Youth career
- 1998–2002: Kashiwa Reysol

Senior career*
Years	Team	Apps	(Gls)
2002–2010	Kashiwa Reysol	104	(21)
2005	→ Vitória (loan)	0	(0)
2006	→ Ehime FC (loan)	45	(11)
2010–2013	Júbilo Iwata	49	(2)
2014–2015	Sagan Tosu	2	(0)
2016–2017	Roasso Kumamoto	15	(3)
Total		215	(37)
Medal record
Kashiwa Reysol
Runner-up	Emperor's Cup	2008
Júbilo Iwata
Winner	J.League Cup	2010
- * Club domestic league appearances and goals

Minoru Suganuma (菅沼 実, Suganuma Minoru; born May 16, 1985) is a former Japanese football player.

== Playing career ==
Suganuma was born in Saitama on May 16, 1985. He joined J1 League club Kashiwa Reysol from youth team in 2002. He debuted in October and played several matches as forward every season. He was loaned to Brazilian club Vitória in 2005 and J2 League club Ehime FC in 2006. At Ehime, he became a regular player as offensive midfielder and scored 11 goals. In 2007, he returned to Reysol. He played as regular offensive midfielder. However Reysol was relegated to J2 end of 2009 season and his opportunity to play decreased in 2010. In July 2010, he moved to J1 club Júbilo Iwata. He played many matches as substitute midfielder and won the champions in 2010 J.League Cup. However he could hardly play in the match in 2013. In 2014, he moved to Sagan Tosu. However he could hardly play in the match and left the club end of 2015 season. After half year blank, he joined J2 club Roasso Kumamoto in August 2016. Although he played many matches in 2016, he could hardly play in the match in 2017 and retired end of 2017 season.

== Club statistics ==
Club performance			League		Cup		League Cup		Total	
Season	Club	League	Apps	Goals	Apps	Goals	Apps	Goals	Apps	Goals
Japan			League		Emperor's Cup		J.League Cup		Total	
2002	Kashiwa Reysol	J1 League	2	0	0	0	0	0	2	0
2003	Kashiwa Reysol	J1 League	4	1	1	0	0	0	5	1
2004	Kashiwa Reysol	J1 League	3	0	0	0	1	0	4	0
Total			9	1	1	0	1	0	11	0
2006	Ehime FC	J2 League	45	11	2	0	-		47	11
Total			45	11	2	0	-		47	11
2007	Kashiwa Reysol	J1 League	29	6	0	0	6	0	35	6
2008	Kashiwa Reysol	J1 League	30	10	5	2	6	1	41	13
2009	Kashiwa Reysol	J1 League	30	4	2	0	6	2	38	6
2010	Kashiwa Reysol	J2 League	6	0	0	0	-		6	0
Total			95	20	7	2	18	4	120	26
2010	Júbilo Iwata	J1 League	18	0	3	2	4	1	25	3
2011	Júbilo Iwata	J1 League	11	0	1	0	2	0	14	0
2012	Júbilo Iwata	J1 League	18	2	0	0	2	0	20	2
2013	Júbilo Iwata	J1 League	2	0	1	0	0	0	3	0
Total			49	2	5	2	8	1	62	5
2014	Sagan Tosu	J1 League	0	0	0	0	2	0	2	0
2015	Sagan Tosu	J1 League	2	0	0	0	1	0	3	0
Total			2	0	0	0	3	0	5	0
2016	Roasso Kumamoto	J2 League	11	2	0	0	–		11	2
2017	Roasso Kumamoto	J2 League	4	1	1	1	–		5	2
Total			15	3	1	1	–		16	4
Career total			215	37	15	4	30	4	260	45
