= 2011 Roasso Kumamoto season =

Roasso Kumamoto
2011 season
- Manager: Takuya Takagi
- Stadium: Kumamoto Athletics Stadium
- J2 League: 11 th

The 2011 Roasso Kumamoto season was a football season held in the Kumamoto Athletics Stadium.

== J2 League ==
Match	Date	Team	Score	Team	Venue	Attendance
1	2011.03.06	Roasso Kumamoto	1-0	Tokyo Verdy	Kumamoto Athletics Stadium	6,611
8	2011.04.23	Roasso Kumamoto	2-1	FC Gifu	Kumamoto Athletics Stadium	5,381
9	2011.04.30	Thespa Kusatsu	1-0	Roasso Kumamoto	Shoda Shoyu Stadium Gunma	3,258
10	2011.05.04	Roasso Kumamoto	0-0	Giravanz Kitakyushu	Kumamoto Athletics Stadium	6,948
11	2011.05.08	Roasso Kumamoto	1-0	Consadole Sapporo	Kumamoto Athletics Stadium	5,709
12	2011.05.14	Mito HollyHock	0-0	Roasso Kumamoto	K's denki Stadium Mito	2,694
13	2011.05.21	Roasso Kumamoto	1-1	JEF United Chiba	Kumamoto Suizenji Stadium	4,349
14	2011.05.28	Yokohama FC	1-2	Roasso Kumamoto	NHK Spring Mitsuzawa Football Stadium	1,853
15	2011.06.04	Kataller Toyama	1-1	Roasso Kumamoto	Toyama Stadium	2,390
16	2011.06.12	Roasso Kumamoto	0-1	FC Tokyo	Kumamoto Athletics Stadium	5,204
17	2011.06.19	Oita Trinita	2-2	Roasso Kumamoto	Oita Bank Dome	6,637
18	2011.06.25	Roasso Kumamoto	2-1	Ehime FC	Kumamoto Athletics Stadium	3,877
2	2011.06.29	Kyoto Sanga FC	0-1	Roasso Kumamoto	Kyoto Nishikyogoku Athletic Stadium	4,015
19	2011.07.02	Roasso Kumamoto	0-0	Sagan Tosu	Kumamoto Athletics Stadium	6,795
20	2011.07.09	JEF United Chiba	1-1	Roasso Kumamoto	Fukuda Denshi Arena	9,646
21	2011.07.17	Roasso Kumamoto	1-1	Kataller Toyama	Kumamoto Athletics Stadium	25,005
22	2011.07.24	FC Tokyo	5-0	Roasso Kumamoto	Tokyo National Stadium	18,195
23	2011.07.31	Shonan Bellmare	1-0	Roasso Kumamoto	Hiratsuka Stadium	7,751
3	2011.08.06	Fagiano Okayama	4-0	Roasso Kumamoto	Kanko Stadium	5,455
24	2011.08.13	Roasso Kumamoto	2-1	Oita Trinita	Kumamoto Athletics Stadium	8,935
25	2011.08.21	Roasso Kumamoto	0-1	Tokushima Vortis	Kumamoto Athletics Stadium	5,345
26	2011.08.27	Tokyo Verdy	5-2	Roasso Kumamoto	Tokyo National Stadium	4,602
4	2011.09.04	Roasso Kumamoto	1-1	Shonan Bellmare	Kumamoto Athletics Stadium	4,238
27	2011.09.11	FC Gifu	1-1	Roasso Kumamoto	Gifu Nagaragawa Stadium	3,145
28	2011.09.18	Roasso Kumamoto	2-0	Gainare Tottori	Kumamoto Athletics Stadium	5,200
29	2011.09.25	Tochigi SC	0-1	Roasso Kumamoto	Tochigi Green Stadium	4,411
5	2011.09.28	Tokushima Vortis	1-0	Roasso Kumamoto	Pocarisweat Stadium	2,424
30	2011.10.01	Roasso Kumamoto	1-0	Thespa Kusatsu	Kumamoto Athletics Stadium	6,797
31	2011.10.16	Ehime FC	1-1	Roasso Kumamoto	Ningineer Stadium	2,869
6	2011.10.19	Roasso Kumamoto	0-1	Tochigi SC	Kumamoto Athletics Stadium	3,189
32	2011.10.23	Roasso Kumamoto	2-1	Mito HollyHock	Kumamoto Athletics Stadium	9,461
7	2011.10.26	Gainare Tottori	0-1	Roasso Kumamoto	Tottori Bank Bird Stadium	1,994
33	2011.10.30	Consadole Sapporo	3-0	Roasso Kumamoto	Sapporo Atsubetsu Stadium	9,337
34	2011.11.06	Roasso Kumamoto	1-2	Kyoto Sanga FC	Kumamoto Suizenji Stadium	2,847
35	2011.11.12	Giravanz Kitakyushu	2-0	Roasso Kumamoto	Honjo Stadium	5,307
36	2011.11.20	Roasso Kumamoto	0-1	Yokohama FC	Kumamoto Athletics Stadium	7,752
37	2011.11.27	Roasso Kumamoto	1-0	Fagiano Okayama	Kumamoto Athletics Stadium	7,981
38	2011.12.03	Sagan Tosu	2-2	Roasso Kumamoto	Best Amenity Stadium	22,532
