= 2018 Roasso Kumamoto season =

Roasso Kumamoto
2018 season
- Manager: Hiroki Shibuya
- Stadium: Egao Kenko Stadium
- J2 League: 21st

2018 Roasso Kumamoto season.

== J2 League ==
Match	Date	Team	Score	Team	Venue	Attendance
1	2018.02.25	Renofa Yamaguchi FC	4-1	Roasso Kumamoto	Ishin Me-Life Stadium	7,456
2	2018.03.04	Roasso Kumamoto	2-1	Tokushima Vortis	Egao Kenko Stadium	5,197
3	2018.03.11	Roasso Kumamoto	1-2	Montedio Yamagata	Egao Kenko Stadium	4,094
4	2018.03.17	Ehime FC	1-2	Roasso Kumamoto	Ningineer Stadium	2,436
5	2018.03.21	Roasso Kumamoto	2-1	Omiya Ardija	Egao Kenko Stadium	4,126
6	2018.03.25	Tochigi SC	1-0	Roasso Kumamoto	Tochigi Green Stadium	4,623
7	2018.04.01	Roasso Kumamoto	3-1	Albirex Niigata	Egao Kenko Stadium	4,691
8	2018.04.08	FC Machida Zelvia	2-2	Roasso Kumamoto	Machida Stadium	3,727
9	2018.04.15	Roasso Kumamoto	0-0	Tokyo Verdy	Egao Kenko Stadium	10,011
10	2018.04.21	Kyoto Sanga FC	1-2	Roasso Kumamoto	Kyoto Nishikyogoku Athletic Stadium	4,405
11	2018.04.28	Fagiano Okayama	3-1	Roasso Kumamoto	City Light Stadium	9,280
12	2018.05.03	Roasso Kumamoto	1-2	FC Gifu	Egao Kenko Stadium	5,247
13	2018.05.06	Roasso Kumamoto	1-4	Ventforet Kofu	Egao Kenko Stadium	4,094
14	2018.05.12	Yokohama FC	4-2	Roasso Kumamoto	NHK Spring Mitsuzawa Football Stadium	3,157
15	2018.05.20	Roasso Kumamoto	2-1	Mito HollyHock	Kumamoto Suizenji Stadium	3,206
16	2018.05.27	JEF United Chiba	3-1	Roasso Kumamoto	Fukuda Denshi Arena	12,440
17	2018.06.03	Oita Trinita	2-0	Roasso Kumamoto	Oita Bank Dome	8,371
18	2018.06.10	Roasso Kumamoto	0-1	Avispa Fukuoka	Kumamoto Suizenji Stadium	5,118
19	2018.06.16	Roasso Kumamoto	1-1	Kamatamare Sanuki	Egao Kenko Stadium	3,740
20	2018.06.23	Zweigen Kanazawa	0-0	Roasso Kumamoto	Ishikawa Athletics Stadium	4,290
21	2018.06.30	Roasso Kumamoto	1-3	Matsumoto Yamaga FC	Egao Kenko Stadium	10,194
22	2018.07.07	Tokushima Vortis	1-0	Roasso Kumamoto	Pocarisweat Stadium	2,974
23	2018.07.16	Roasso Kumamoto	2-3	FC Machida Zelvia	Egao Kenko Stadium	3,571
24	2018.07.21	Ventforet Kofu	3-2	Roasso Kumamoto	Yamanashi Chuo Bank Stadium	6,530
25	2018.07.25	Roasso Kumamoto	2-2	Renofa Yamaguchi FC	Egao Kenko Stadium	3,576
26	2018.07.29	Omiya Ardija	2-1	Roasso Kumamoto	NACK5 Stadium Omiya	7,278
27	2018.08.05	Roasso Kumamoto	0-1	Zweigen Kanazawa	Egao Kenko Stadium	3,894
28	2018.08.11	Roasso Kumamoto	3-5	Yokohama FC	Egao Kenko Stadium	5,423
29	2018.08.19	FC Gifu	0-2	Roasso Kumamoto	Gifu Nagaragawa Stadium	5,093
30	2018.08.26	Roasso Kumamoto	0-1	Tochigi SC	Egao Kenko Stadium	5,012
31	2018.09.01	Montedio Yamagata	2-1	Roasso Kumamoto	ND Soft Stadium Yamagata	4,866
32	2018.09.08	Roasso Kumamoto	1-3	Oita Trinita	Egao Kenko Stadium	10,226
33	2018.09.16	Tokyo Verdy	2-2	Roasso Kumamoto	Ajinomoto Stadium	5,560
34	2018.09.23	Matsumoto Yamaga FC	2-0	Roasso Kumamoto	Matsumotodaira Park Stadium	12,478
35	2018.09.30	Roasso Kumamoto	0-4	Kyoto Sanga FC	Egao Kenko Stadium	3,429
36	2018.10.07	Roasso Kumamoto	1-3	JEF United Chiba	Egao Kenko Stadium	3,936
37	2018.10.14	Kamatamare Sanuki	1-0	Roasso Kumamoto	Pikara Stadium	3,850
38	2018.10.21	Mito HollyHock	3-2	Roasso Kumamoto	K's denki Stadium Mito	4,055
39	2018.10.28	Roasso Kumamoto	0-0	Fagiano Okayama	Egao Kenko Stadium	6,211
40	2018.11.03	Albirex Niigata	2-3	Roasso Kumamoto	Denka Big Swan Stadium	16,479
41	2018.11.11	Avispa Fukuoka	1-0	Roasso Kumamoto	Level5 Stadium	15,331
42	2018.11.17	Roasso Kumamoto	3-0	Ehime FC	Egao Kenko Stadium	5,647
