= Takuya Mikami =

Japanese footballer

Takuya Mikami 三上 卓哉
Personal information
- Full name: Takuya Mikami
- Date of birth: February 13, 1980 (age 46)
- Place of birth: Saitama, Saitama, Japan
- Height: 1.77 m (5 ft 9 1/2 in)
- Position: Defender

Youth career
- 1995–1997: Bunan High School
- 1998–2001: Komazawa University

Senior career*
| Years | Team | Apps | (Gls) |
| 2002–2004 | Urawa Reds | 5 | (0) |
| 2004–2007 | Kyoto Sanga FC | 93 | (2) |
| 2008–2011 | Ehime FC | 80 | (0) |
| Total | | 178 | (2) |
Medal record
Urawa Reds
| Runner-up | J1 League | 2004 |
| Winner | J.League Cup | 2003 |
| Runner-up | J.League Cup | 2002 |
| Runner-up | J.League Cup | 2004 |
- * Club domestic league appearances and goals

Takuya Mikami (三上 卓哉, Mikami Takuya; born February 13, 1980) is a former Japanese football player. His older brother Kazuyoshi is also a former football player.

== Playing career ==
Mikami was born in Saitama on February 13, 1980. After graduating from Komazawa University, he joined his local club Urawa Reds in J1 League in 2002. Although he played several matches as left side midfielder, he hardly played in matches until 2004. In June 2004, he moved to J2 League club Kyoto Purple Sanga (later Kyoto Sanga FC). He soon became a regular player as left side back. Sanga won the champions in 2005 season and was promoted to J1. However his opportunity to play decreased from 2006 and Sanga was relegated to J2 a year later. In 2008, he moved to J2 club Ehime FC. He played as regular left side back. However his opportunity to play decreased from 2010 and he retired at the end of the 2011 season.

== Career statistics ==
Appearances and goals by club, season and competition
| Club | Season | League | | | Emperor's Cup | | J.League Cup | | Total | |
| Club | Season | Division | Apps | Goals | Apps | Goals | Apps | Goals | Apps | Goals |
|---|---|---|---|---|---|---|---|---|---|---|
| Urawa Reds | 2002 | J1 League | 0 | 0 | 1 | 0 | 0 | 0 | 1 | 0 |
| Urawa Reds | 2003 | J1 League | 4 | 0 | 0 | 0 | 4 | 0 | 8 | 0 |
| Urawa Reds | 2004 | J1 League | 1 | 0 | 0 | 0 | 1 | 0 | 2 | 0 |
| Kyoto Purple Sanga | 2004 | J2 League | 19 | 0 | 2 | 0 | — | | 21 | 0 |
| Kyoto Purple Sanga | 2005 | J2 League | 38 | 1 | 1 | 0 | — | | 39 | 1 |
| Kyoto Purple Sanga | 2006 | J1 League | 11 | 0 | 1 | 0 | 5 | 0 | 17 | 0 |
| Kyoto Sanga FC | 2007 | J2 League | 25 | 1 | 1 | 0 | — | | 26 | 1 |
| Ehime FC | 2008 | J2 League | 35 | 0 | 1 | 0 | — | | 36 | 0 |
| Ehime FC | 2009 | J2 League | 29 | 0 | 1 | 0 | — | | 30 | 0 |
| Ehime FC | 2010 | J2 League | 12 | 0 | 1 | 0 | — | | 13 | 0 |
| Ehime FC | 2011 | J2 League | 4 | 0 | 1 | 0 | — | | 5 | 0 |
| Career total | | | 178 | 2 | 10 | 0 | 10 | 0 | 198 | 2 |
