= 2004 Oita Trinita season =

Oita Trinita
2004 season
- Manager: Han Berger
- Stadium: Oita Stadium
- J. League 1: 13th
- Emperor's Cup: 5th Round
- J. League Cup: GL-C 4th
- Top goalscorer: Magno Alves (11)
Home colours	Away colours

During the 2004 season, Oita Trinita competed in the J. League 1, in which they finished 13th.

== Competitions ==
Competitions	Position
J. League 1	13th / 16 clubs
Emperor's Cup	5th Round
J. League Cup	GL-C 4th / 4 clubs

== Domestic results ==
=== J. League 1 ===
Match	Date	Venue	Opponents	Score
1-1	2004.3.13	Hitachi Kashiwa Soccer Stadium	Kashiwa Reysol	2-1
1-2	2004.3.20	Oita Stadium	FC Tokyo	2-1
1-3	2004.4.3	Kobe Wing Stadium	Vissel Kobe	0-0
1-4	2004.4.10	Oita Stadium	Sanfrecce Hiroshima	2-1
1-5	2004.4.14	Oita Stadium	Yokohama F. Marinos	1-1
1-6	2004.4.18	Urawa Komaba Stadium	Urawa Red Diamonds	4-1
1-7	2004.5.2	Oita Stadium	Cerezo Osaka	3-0
1-8	2004.5.5	Yamaha Stadium	Júbilo Iwata	2-1
1-9	2004.5.9	Kashima Soccer Stadium	Kashima Antlers	3-0
1-10	2004.5.15	Oita Stadium	Gamba Osaka	4-3
1-11	2004.5.22	Nihondaira Sports Stadium	Shimizu S-Pulse	1-2
1-12	2004.6.12	Oita Stadium	Albirex Niigata	0-1
1-13	2004.6.16	Mizuho Athletic Stadium	Nagoya Grampus Eight	2-1
1-14	2004.6.20	Oita Stadium	JEF United Ichihara	2-3
1-15	2004.6.26	Ajinomoto Stadium	Tokyo Verdy 1969	3-1
2-1	2004.8.14	Oita Stadium	Júbilo Iwata	1-1
2-2	2004.8.21	International Stadium Yokohama	Yokohama F. Marinos	2-1
2-3	2004.8.29	Osaka Nagai Stadium	Cerezo Osaka	1-2
2-4	2004.9.12	Oita Stadium	Urawa Red Diamonds	1-4
2-5	2004.9.18	Oita Stadium	Shimizu S-Pulse	1-0
2-6	2004.9.23	Ichihara Seaside Stadium	JEF United Ichihara	2-0
2-8	2004.10.2	Niigata Stadium	Albirex Niigata	3-0
2-9	2004.10.17	Oita Stadium	Tokyo Verdy 1969	2-3
2-10	2004.10.24	Osaka Expo '70 Stadium	Gamba Osaka	3-1
2-11	2004.10.30	Oita Stadium	Vissel Kobe	2-0
2-12	2004.11.6	Ajinomoto Stadium	FC Tokyo	1-1
2-7	2004.11.10	Oita Stadium	Nagoya Grampus Eight	0-4
2-13	2004.11.20	Oita Stadium	Kashima Antlers	0-3
2-14	2004.11.23	Hiroshima Big Arch	Sanfrecce Hiroshima	0-0
2-15	2004.11.28	Oita Stadium	Kashiwa Reysol	2-2

=== Emperor's Cup ===
Match	Date	Venue	Opponents	Score
4th Round	2004.11.14	Kose Sports Park Stadium	Ventforet Kofu	1-2
5th Round	2004.12.12	Kumamoto Athletics Stadium	Consadole Sapporo	1-0

=== J. League Cup ===
Match	Date	Venue	Opponents	Score
GL-C-1	2004.3.27	Urawa Komaba Stadium	Urawa Red Diamonds	2-3
GL-C-2	2004.4.29	Oita Stadium	JEF United Ichihara	1-4
GL-C-3	2004.5.29	Oita Stadium	Urawa Red Diamonds	0-3
GL-C-4	2004.6.5	Akita Yabase Stadium	JEF United Ichihara	2-0
GL-C-5	2004.7.17	Nihondaira Sports Stadium	Shimizu S-Pulse	1-0
GL-C-6	2004.7.24	Oita Stadium	Shimizu S-Pulse	0-2

== Player statistics ==
No.	Pos.	Player	D.o.B. (Age)	Height / Weight	J. League 1		Emperor's Cup		J. League Cup		Total	
No.	Pos.	Player	D.o.B. (Age)	Height / Weight	Apps	Goals	Apps	Goals	Apps	Goals	Apps	Goals
1	GK	Hayato Okanaka	September 26, 1968 (aged 35)	cm / kg	11	0						
2	DF	Takashi Miki	July 23, 1978 (aged 25)	cm / kg	23	1						
3	DF	Sandro	May 19, 1973 (aged 30)	cm / kg	25	1						
4	DF	Tetsuya Ito	October 1, 1970 (aged 33)	cm / kg	0	0						
5	MF	Richard Witschge	September 20, 1969 (aged 34)	cm / kg	9	0						
5	DF	Patrick Zwaanswijk	January 17, 1975 (aged 29)	cm / kg	11	0						
6	DF	Kazuyoshi Mikami	August 29, 1975 (aged 28)	cm / kg	19	0						
7	MF	Teppei Nishiyama	February 22, 1975 (aged 29)	cm / kg	14	1						
8	MF	Tomoaki Komorida	July 10, 1981 (aged 22)	cm / kg	24	0						
9	FW	Takayuki Yoshida	March 14, 1977 (aged 26)	cm / kg	30	5						
10	FW	Magno Alves	January 13, 1976 (aged 28)	cm / kg	29	11						
11	FW	Ryosuke Kijima	May 29, 1979 (aged 24)	cm / kg	18	3						
13	FW	Daiki Takamatsu	September 8, 1981 (aged 22)	cm / kg	24	8						
14	MF	Haruki Seto	March 14, 1978 (aged 25)	cm / kg	17	0						
15	MF	Takashi Umeda	May 30, 1976 (aged 27)	cm / kg	25	0						
16	GK	Riki Takasaki	July 11, 1970 (aged 33)	cm / kg	20	0						
17	DF	Yuichi Nemoto	July 21, 1981 (aged 22)	cm / kg	18	2						
18	DF	Takashi Kuramoto	August 8, 1984 (aged 19)	cm / kg	1	0						
19	MF	Taku Harada	October 27, 1982 (aged 21)	cm / kg	20	2						
20	FW	Shota Matsuhashi	August 3, 1982 (aged 21)	cm / kg	16	1						
22	MF	Kentaro Uramoto	November 13, 1982 (aged 21)	cm / kg	1	0						
23	DF	Koji Arimura	August 25, 1976 (aged 27)	cm / kg	25	0						
24	DF	Tomoya Kanamori	April 2, 1982 (aged 21)	cm / kg	0	0						
25	DF	Tetsuya Yamazaki	July 25, 1978 (aged 25)	cm / kg	13	0						
26	FW	Yoshihiro Uchimura	August 24, 1984 (aged 19)	cm / kg	1	0						
27	MF	Tomohisa Yoshida	May 27, 1984 (aged 19)	cm / kg	0	0						
28	GK	Koji Ezumi	December 18, 1978 (aged 25)	cm / kg	0	0						
29	MF	Koji Yoshimura	April 13, 1976 (aged 27)	cm / kg	13	0						
33	MF	Hideki Nagai	January 26, 1971 (aged 33)	cm / kg	2	0						

== Other pages ==
- (in Japanese) J. League official site
