= 2015 Roasso Kumamoto season =

Roasso Kumamoto
2015 season
- Manager: Takeshi Ono
- Stadium: Umakana-Yokana Stadium
- J2 League: 13th

2015 Roasso Kumamoto season.

== J2 League ==
=== League table ===
Pos	Team	Pld	W	D	L	GF	GA	GD	Pts
12	Zweigen Kanazawa	42	12	18	12	46	43	+3	54
13	Roasso Kumamoto	42	13	14	15	42	45	−3	53
14	Tokushima Vortis	42	13	14	15	35	44	−9	53

Source: Meiji Yasuda J2 League Standing
Rules for classification: 1) Points; 2) Goal difference; 3) Goals scored

=== Match details ===
J2 League match details
Match	Date	Team	Score	Team	Venue	Attendance
1	2015.03.08	Mito HollyHock	0-0	Roasso Kumamoto	Kasamatsu Stadium	4,787
2	2015.03.15	Roasso Kumamoto	2-2	Thespakusatsu Gunma	Kumamoto Suizenji Stadium	5,075
3	2015.03.21	Ehime FC	0-1	Roasso Kumamoto	Ningineer Stadium	2,278
4	2015.03.29	Avispa Fukuoka	1-0	Roasso Kumamoto	Level5 Stadium	8,361
5	2015.04.01	Roasso Kumamoto	2-2	Tokushima Vortis	Umakana-Yokana Stadium	4,072
6	2015.04.05	Omiya Ardija	2-0	Roasso Kumamoto	NACK5 Stadium Omiya	5,428
7	2015.04.11	Roasso Kumamoto	0-1	Yokohama FC	Umakana-Yokana Stadium	7,040
8	2015.04.19	Fagiano Okayama	3-0	Roasso Kumamoto	City Light Stadium	7,060
9	2015.04.26	Roasso Kumamoto	0-2	Zweigen Kanazawa	Umakana-Yokana Stadium	4,790
10	2015.04.29	Roasso Kumamoto	0-4	JEF United Chiba	Umakana-Yokana Stadium	6,038
11	2015.05.03	Tochigi SC	2-2	Roasso Kumamoto	Tochigi Green Stadium	3,761
12	2015.05.06	Roasso Kumamoto	0-0	Oita Trinita	Umakana-Yokana Stadium	12,770
13	2015.05.09	Consadole Sapporo	2-3	Roasso Kumamoto	Sapporo Dome	10,405
14	2015.05.17	Roasso Kumamoto	1-2	FC Gifu	Kumamoto Suizenji Stadium	4,164
15	2015.05.24	Roasso Kumamoto	0-0	Cerezo Osaka	Umakana-Yokana Stadium	13,132
16	2015.05.31	Kyoto Sanga FC	2-1	Roasso Kumamoto	Kyoto Nishikyogoku Athletic Stadium	7,827
17	2015.06.06	Roasso Kumamoto	1-0	V-Varen Nagasaki	Kumamoto Suizenji Stadium	4,560
18	2015.06.14	Giravanz Kitakyushu	2-0	Roasso Kumamoto	Honjo Stadium	3,498
19	2015.06.21	Tokyo Verdy	0-2	Roasso Kumamoto	Komazawa Olympic Park Stadium	2,691
20	2015.06.28	Roasso Kumamoto	0-1	Kamatamare Sanuki	Umakana-Yokana Stadium	8,309
21	2015.07.04	Júbilo Iwata	1-1	Roasso Kumamoto	Yamaha Stadium	8,114
22	2015.07.08	Thespakusatsu Gunma	1-1	Roasso Kumamoto	Shoda Shoyu Stadium Gunma	1,618
23	2015.07.12	Roasso Kumamoto	2-0	Ehime FC	Umakana-Yokana Stadium	3,978
24	2015.07.18	Yokohama FC	0-3	Roasso Kumamoto	NHK Spring Mitsuzawa Football Stadium	7,506
25	2015.07.22	Roasso Kumamoto	0-1	Tokyo Verdy	Umakana-Yokana Stadium	3,956
26	2015.07.26	JEF United Chiba	2-3	Roasso Kumamoto	Fukuda Denshi Arena	8,499
27	2015.08.01	Roasso Kumamoto	2-0	Tochigi SC	Umakana-Yokana Stadium	5,116
28	2015.08.08	FC Gifu	0-1	Roasso Kumamoto	Gifu Nagaragawa Stadium	7,272
29	2015.08.15	Roasso Kumamoto	0-1	Giravanz Kitakyushu	Umakana-Yokana Stadium	7,680
30	2015.08.23	Roasso Kumamoto	1-1	Consadole Sapporo	Umakana-Yokana Stadium	6,532
31	2015.09.13	Oita Trinita	0-1	Roasso Kumamoto	Oita Bank Dome	6,890
32	2015.09.20	Roasso Kumamoto	0-0	Kyoto Sanga FC	Umakana-Yokana Stadium	7,051
33	2015.09.23	Roasso Kumamoto	0-1	Avispa Fukuoka	Umakana-Yokana Stadium	10,142
34	2015.09.27	Zweigen Kanazawa	1-1	Roasso Kumamoto	Ishikawa Athletics Stadium	3,163
35	2015.10.04	V-Varen Nagasaki	1-2	Roasso Kumamoto	Nagasaki Stadium	5,250
36	2015.10.10	Roasso Kumamoto	3-0	Omiya Ardija	Kumamoto Suizenji Stadium	4,002
37	2015.10.18	Kamatamare Sanuki	0-2	Roasso Kumamoto	Pikara Stadium	2,380
38	2015.10.25	Roasso Kumamoto	0-2	Júbilo Iwata	Umakana-Yokana Stadium	12,404
39	2015.11.01	Cerezo Osaka	1-1	Roasso Kumamoto	Kincho Stadium	10,194
40	2015.11.08	Roasso Kumamoto	1-1	Mito HollyHock	Umakana-Yokana Stadium	8,781
41	2015.11.14	Tokushima Vortis	2-1	Roasso Kumamoto	Pocarisweat Stadium	4,124
42	2015.11.23	Roasso Kumamoto	1-1	Fagiano Okayama	Umakana-Yokana Stadium	8,193
