= 2014 Roasso Kumamoto season =

Roasso Kumamoto
2014 season
- Manager: Takeshi Ono
- Stadium: Umakana-Yokana Stadium
- J2 League: 13th

2014 Roasso Kumamoto season.

== J2 League ==
Match	Date	Team	Score	Team	Venue	Attendance
1	2014.03.02	Roasso Kumamoto	2-1	Avispa Fukuoka	Umakana-Yokana Stadium	9,679
2	2014.03.09	Roasso Kumamoto	0-1	Matsumoto Yamaga FC	Umakana-Yokana Stadium	5,521
3	2014.03.16	Júbilo Iwata	3-1	Roasso Kumamoto	Yamaha Stadium	7,998
4	2014.03.22	Roasso Kumamoto	1-1	Oita Trinita	Umakana-Yokana Stadium	9,492
5	2014.03.30	JEF United Chiba	3-0	Roasso Kumamoto	Fukuda Denshi Arena	5,957
6	2014.04.05	Yokohama FC	0-1	Roasso Kumamoto	NHK Spring Mitsuzawa Football Stadium	3,719
7	2014.04.13	Roasso Kumamoto	4-1	Kamatamare Sanuki	Umakana-Yokana Stadium	6,574
8	2014.04.20	Montedio Yamagata	1-2	Roasso Kumamoto	ND Soft Stadium Yamagata	5,766
9	2014.04.26	Roasso Kumamoto	1-1	V-Varen Nagasaki	Umakana-Yokana Stadium	7,355
10	2014.04.29	Mito HollyHock	0-0	Roasso Kumamoto	K's denki Stadium Mito	3,431
11	2014.05.03	Roasso Kumamoto	0-0	Fagiano Okayama	Umakana-Yokana Stadium	7,581
12	2014.05.06	Consadole Sapporo	2-2	Roasso Kumamoto	Sapporo Dome	12,302
13	2014.05.11	Roasso Kumamoto	1-3	Shonan Bellmare	Umakana-Yokana Stadium	6,517
14	2014.05.18	Roasso Kumamoto	0-0	Tokyo Verdy	Kumamoto Suizenji Stadium	4,268
15	2014.05.24	Tochigi SC	1-1	Roasso Kumamoto	Tochigi Green Stadium	3,536
16	2014.05.31	Roasso Kumamoto	2-0	Kataller Toyama	Kumamoto Suizenji Stadium	3,580
17	2014.06.07	Giravanz Kitakyushu	1-1	Roasso Kumamoto	Honjo Stadium	3,702
18	2014.06.14	Thespakusatsu Gunma	1-1	Roasso Kumamoto	Shoda Shoyu Stadium Gunma	2,461
19	2014.06.21	Roasso Kumamoto	1-4	Kyoto Sanga FC	Umakana-Yokana Stadium	7,031
20	2014.06.28	Ehime FC	4-0	Roasso Kumamoto	Ningineer Stadium	2,821
21	2014.07.05	Roasso Kumamoto	0-3	FC Gifu	Umakana-Yokana Stadium	5,550
22	2014.07.20	Shonan Bellmare	2-1	Roasso Kumamoto	Shonan BMW Stadium Hiratsuka	7,519
23	2014.07.26	Roasso Kumamoto	2-1	Mito HollyHock	Umakana-Yokana Stadium	10,232
24	2014.07.30	Matsumoto Yamaga FC	2-1	Roasso Kumamoto	Matsumotodaira Park Stadium	11,265
25	2014.08.03	Roasso Kumamoto	0-1	Thespakusatsu Gunma	Umakana-Yokana Stadium	4,870
26	2014.08.10	Kamatamare Sanuki	1-1	Roasso Kumamoto	Kagawa Marugame Stadium	2,066
27	2014.08.17	Roasso Kumamoto	0-0	JEF United Chiba	Umakana-Yokana Stadium	5,357
28	2014.08.24	Kataller Toyama	0-2	Roasso Kumamoto	Toyama Stadium	3,371
29	2014.08.31	Roasso Kumamoto	0-2	Consadole Sapporo	Umakana-Yokana Stadium	5,625
30	2014.09.06	Oita Trinita	0-1	Roasso Kumamoto	Oita Bank Dome	20,636
31	2014.09.14	Roasso Kumamoto	2-2	Yokohama FC	Umakana-Yokana Stadium	8,234
32	2014.09.20	Roasso Kumamoto	2-1	Tochigi SC	Umakana-Yokana Stadium	5,218
33	2014.09.23	FC Gifu	2-3	Roasso Kumamoto	Gifu Nagaragawa Stadium	7,328
34	2014.09.28	Roasso Kumamoto	0-1	Giravanz Kitakyushu	Umakana-Yokana Stadium	7,026
35	2014.10.04	Tokyo Verdy	1-0	Roasso Kumamoto	Komazawa Olympic Park Stadium	2,924
36	2014.10.11	Kyoto Sanga FC	0-0	Roasso Kumamoto	Kyoto Nishikyogoku Athletic Stadium	5,906
37	2014.10.19	Roasso Kumamoto	0-0	Júbilo Iwata	Umakana-Yokana Stadium	12,661
38	2014.10.26	V-Varen Nagasaki	0-1	Roasso Kumamoto	Nagasaki City Kakidomari Stadium	4,262
39	2014.11.01	Roasso Kumamoto	1-3	Montedio Yamagata	Umakana-Yokana Stadium	7,751
40	2014.11.09	Roasso Kumamoto	3-1	Ehime FC	Kumamoto Suizenji Stadium	6,924
41	2014.11.15	Fagiano Okayama	1-1	Roasso Kumamoto	Kanko Stadium	8,290
42	2014.11.23	Avispa Fukuoka	1-3	Roasso Kumamoto	Level5 Stadium	7,799
