= Tomoya Kanamori =

Japanese footballer (born 1982)

Tomoya Kanamori 金守 智哉
Personal information
- Full name: Tomoya Kanamori
- Date of birth: April 2, 1982 (age 44)
- Place of birth: Ise, Mie, Japan
- Height: 1.78 m (5 ft 10 in)
- Position: Defender

Youth career
- 1998–2000: Yokkaichi Chuo Technical High School

Senior career*
Years	Team	Apps	(Gls)
2001–2004	Oita Trinita	0	(0)
2003	→ Okinawa Kariyushi FC (loan)	0	(0)
2004–2011	Ehime FC	196	(6)
Total		196	(6)
- * Club domestic league appearances and goals

Tomoya Kanamori (金守 智哉, Kanamori Tomoya; born April 2, 1982) is a former Japanese football player.

== Playing career ==
Kanamori was born in Ise on April 2, 1982. After graduating from high school, he joined J2 League club Oita Trinita in 2001. However he could not play at all in the match until 2002. Trinita won the champions in 2002 season and was promoted to J1 League from 2003. On April 23, he debuted as substitute defender against Kyoto Purple Sanga in 2003 J.League Cup. However he could only play this match. In October 2003, he moved to Regional Leagues club Okinawa Kariyushi FC on loan. In 2004, he returned to Trinita. However he could only play 2 matches in J.League Cup. In October 2004, he moved to Japan Football League club Ehime FC. He became a regular player as center back soon. Ehime won the champions in 2005 season and was promoted to J2. Although he played many matches until 2009, his opportunity to play decreased from 2010. He could not play at all in the match in 2011 and retired end of 2011 season.

== Club statistics ==
Club performance			League		Cup		League Cup		Total	
Season	Club	League	Apps	Goals	Apps	Goals	Apps	Goals	Apps	Goals
Japan			League		Emperor's Cup		J.League Cup		Total	
2001	Oita Trinita	J2 League	0	0	0	0	0	0	0	0
2002	Oita Trinita	J2 League	0	0	0	0	-		0	0
2003	Oita Trinita	J1 League	0	0	0	0	1	0	1	0
2003	Okinawa Kariyushi FC	Regional Leagues	0	0			-		0	0
2004	Oita Trinita	J1 League	0	0	0	0	2	0	2	0
2004	Ehime FC	Football League	7	0			-		7	0
2005	Ehime FC	Football League	29	4	2	0	-		31	4
2006	Ehime FC	J2 League	46	0	2	0	-		48	0
2007	Ehime FC	J2 League	33	0	4	0	-		37	0
2008	Ehime FC	J2 League	35	2	1	0	-		36	2
2009	Ehime FC	J2 League	36	0	1	0	-		37	0
2010	Ehime FC	J2 League	10	0	0	0	-		10	0
2011	Ehime FC	J2 League	0	0	0	0	-		0	0
Total			196	6	10	0	3	0	209	6
