= Hiromasa Yamamoto =

Japanese footballer (born 1979)

Hiromasa Yamamoto 山本 浩正
Personal information
- Full name: Hiromasa Yamamoto
- Date of birth: June 5, 1979 (age 47)
- Place of birth: Okazaki, Aichi, Japan
- Height: 1.87 m (6 ft 1 1/2 in)
- Position: Goalkeeper

Youth career
- 1995–1997: Shimizu Higashi High School

Senior career*
| Years | Team | Apps | (Gls) |
| 1998–2006 | Júbilo Iwata | 28 | (0) |
| 2004 | →Vissel Kobe (loan) | 1 | (0) |
| 2007–2008 | Cerezo Osaka | 16 | (0) |
| 2009–2010 | Ehime FC | 68 | (0) |
| 2011 | SC Sagamihara | 3 | (0) |
| Total | | 116 | (0) |
Medal record
Júbilo Iwata
| Winner | J1 League | 1999 |
| Winner | J1 League | 2002 |
| Runner-up | J1 League | 1998 |
| Runner-up | J1 League | 2001 |
| Runner-up | J1 League | 2003 |
| Winner | J.League Cup | 1998 |
| Runner-up | J.League Cup | 2001 |
| Winner | Emperor's Cup | 2003 |
| Runner-up | Emperor's Cup | 2004 |
- * Club domestic league appearances and goals

Hiromasa Yamamoto (山本 浩正, Yamamoto Hiromasa; born June 5, 1979) is a former Japanese football player.

== Playing career ==
Yamamoto was born in Okazaki on June 5, 1979. After graduating from Shimizu Higashi High School, he joined J1 League club Júbilo Iwata in 1998. However he could hardly play in the match behind Tomoaki Ogami and Arno van Zwam until early 2002. In September 2002, he became a regular goalkeeper instead van Zwam. However he could hardly play in the match in 2003. In September 2003, van Zwam left the club and Yamamoto became a regular goalkeeper again. However he could hardly play in the match behind new member Yohei Sato in 2004. In September 2004, he moved to Vissel Kobe on loan. However he could hardly play in the match behind Seiji Honda and Makoto Kakegawa. In 2005, he returned to Júbilo Iwata. However the club gained Japan national team goalkeeper Yoshikatsu Kawaguchi and Yamamoto could not play at all in the match behind Kawaguchi. In 2007, he moved to J2 League club Cerezo Osaka. Although he could not play at all in the match behind Motohiro Yoshida in 2007, he battles with Takashi Aizawa for the position and played many matches. In 2009, he moved to J2 club Ehime FC. He played as regular goalkeeper until late 2010 because regular goalkeeper Yusuke Kawakita got hurt. However Kawakita came back in late 2010 and Yamamoto could hardly play in the match. In 2011, he moved to Regional Leagues club SC Sagamihara. He retired end of 2011 season.

== Club statistics ==
| Club performance | | | League | | Cup | | League Cup | | Continental | | Total | |
| Season | Club | League | Apps | Goals | Apps | Goals | Apps | Goals | Apps | Goals | Apps | Goals |
| Japan | | | League | | Emperor's Cup | | J.League Cup | | Asia | | Total | |
|---|---|---|---|---|---|---|---|---|---|---|---|---|
| 1998 | Júbilo Iwata | J1 League | 0 | 0 | 0 | 0 | 0 | 0 | - | | 0 | 0 |
| 1999 | Júbilo Iwata | J1 League | 0 | 0 | 0 | 0 | 0 | 0 | - | | 0 | 0 |
| 2000 | Júbilo Iwata | J1 League | 0 | 0 | 0 | 0 | 0 | 0 | - | | 0 | 0 |
| 2001 | Júbilo Iwata | J1 League | 2 | 0 | 0 | 0 | 0 | 0 | - | | 2 | 0 |
| 2002 | Júbilo Iwata | J1 League | 14 | 0 | 3 | 0 | 2 | 0 | - | | 19 | 0 |
| 2003 | Júbilo Iwata | J1 League | 12 | 0 | 0 | 0 | 4 | 0 | - | | 16 | 0 |
| 2004 | Júbilo Iwata | J1 League | 0 | 0 | 0 | 0 | 1 | 0 | 1 | 0 | 2 | 0 |
| 2004 | Vissel Kobe | J1 League | 1 | 0 | 0 | 0 | 0 | 0 | - | | 1 | 0 |
| 2005 | Júbilo Iwata | J1 League | 0 | 0 | 0 | 0 | 0 | 0 | - | | 0 | 0 |
| 2006 | Júbilo Iwata | J1 League | 0 | 0 | 0 | 0 | 0 | 0 | - | | 0 | 0 |
| 2007 | Cerezo Osaka | J2 League | 0 | 0 | 0 | 0 | - | | - | | 0 | 0 |
| 2008 | Cerezo Osaka | J2 League | 16 | 0 | 2 | 0 | - | | - | | 18 | 0 |
| 2009 | Ehime FC | J2 League | 45 | 0 | 1 | 0 | - | | - | | 46 | 0 |
| 2010 | Ehime FC | J2 League | 23 | 0 | 1 | 0 | - | | - | | 24 | 0 |
| 2011 | SC Sagamihara | Regional Leagues | 3 | 0 | - | | - | | - | | 3 | 0 |
| Total | | | 116 | 0 | 7 | 0 | 7 | 0 | 1 | 0 | 131 | 0 |
