= Susumu Oki =

Japanese footballer

Susumu Oki 大木 勉
Personal information
- Full name: Susumu Oki
- Date of birth: February 23, 1976 (age 50)
- Place of birth: Matsuyama, Ehime, Japan
- Height: 1.77 m (5 ft 9 1/2 in)
- Position: Forward

Youth career
- 1991–1993: Minamiuwa High School
- 1994: Aoyama Gakuin University

Senior career*
Years	Team	Apps	(Gls)
1995–2006	Sanfrecce Hiroshima	190	(36)
2000	→ Oita Trinita (loan)	6	(0)
2007–2012	Ehime FC	79	(9)
Total		275	(45)

International career
1995	Japan U-20	4	(1)
Medal record
Sanfrecce Hiroshima
Runner-up	Emperor's Cup	1995
Runner-up	Emperor's Cup	1996
Runner-up	Emperor's Cup	1999
- * Club domestic league appearances and goals

Susumu Oki (大木 勉, Ōki Susumu; born February 23, 1976) is a former Japanese football player.

== Club career ==
Oki was born in Matsuyama on February 23, 1976. After dropped out from Aoyama Gakuin University, he joined Sanfrecce Hiroshima in 1995. However he could not play in many matches, he moved to J2 League club Oita Trinita in 2000. He returned to Sanfrecce in 2001. From 2001, he played many matches. In 2006, he could hardly play in the match for injury and moved to his local club Ehime FC in 2007. He played many matches in young team. From 2010, his opportunity to play decreased and retired end of 2012 season.

== National team career ==
In April 1995, Oki was selected Japan U-20 national team for 1995 World Youth Championship. He played all 4 matches and scored a goal against Chile in first match.

== Career statistics ==
Appearances and goals by club, season and competition
Club	Season	League			Emperor's Cup		J.League Cup		Total	
Club	Season	Division	Apps	Goals	Apps	Goals	Apps	Goals	Apps	Goals
Sanfrecce Hiroshima	1995	J1 League	14	2	1	0	—		15	2
Sanfrecce Hiroshima	1996	J1 League	7	0	0	0	4	1	11	1
Sanfrecce Hiroshima	1997	J1 League	11	1	1	0	0	0	12	1
Sanfrecce Hiroshima	1998	J1 League	20	4	3	0	4	0	27	4
Sanfrecce Hiroshima	1999	J1 League	6	1	0	0	2	0	8	1
Oita Trinita	2000	J2 League	6	0	0	0	2	0	8	0
Sanfrecce Hiroshima	2001	J1 League	20	8	1	0	3	3	24	11
Sanfrecce Hiroshima	2002	J1 League	18	4	3	1	5	0	26	5
Sanfrecce Hiroshima	2003	J2 League	36	8	3	1	—		39	9
Sanfrecce Hiroshima	2004	J1 League	21	5	0	0	4	0	25	5
Sanfrecce Hiroshima	2005	J1 League	32	3	2	1	5	2	39	6
Sanfrecce Hiroshima	2006	J1 League	5	0	0	0	0	0	5	0
Ehime FC	2007	J2 League	15	2	2	0	—		17	2
Ehime FC	2008	J2 League	23	3	2	1	—		25	4
Ehime FC	2009	J2 League	27	2	0	0	—		27	2
Ehime FC	2010	J2 League	8	1	0	0	—		8	1
Ehime FC	2011	J2 League	5	1	1	0	—		6	1
Ehime FC	2012	J2 League	1	0	0	0	—		1	0
Career total			275	39	19	4	29	6	323	49
