= Yohei Kurakawa =

Japanese footballer (born 1977)

Yohei Kurakawa 藏川 洋平
Personal information
- Full name: Yohei Kurakawa
- Date of birth: August 10, 1977 (age 49)
- Place of birth: Sanyo-Onoda, Yamaguchi, Japan
- Height: 1.73 m (5 ft 8 in)
- Position: Defender

Youth career
- 1993–1995: Tatara Gakuen High School
- 1996–1999: Aichi Gakuin University

Senior career*
Years	Team	Apps	(Gls)
2000	Yokohama F. Marinos	0	(0)
2001–2005	FC Horikoshi		
2006–2011	Kashiwa Reysol	107	(5)
2012–2016	Roasso Kumamoto	132	(5)
2017–2018	Suzuka Unlimited FC	10	(0)
Total		257	(10)

Managerial career
- 2017: Suzuka Unlimited FC
Medal record
Yokohama F. Marinos
Runner-up	J1 League	2000
Kashiwa Reysol
Winner	J1 League	2011
Runner-up	Emperor's Cup	2008
- * Club domestic league appearances and goals as of 1 January 2019

Yohei Kurakawa (藏川 洋平, Kurakawa Yohei; born August 10, 1977) is a Japanese football player.

== Playing career ==
Kurakawa was born in Sanyo-Onoda on August 10, 1977. After graduating from Aichi Gakuin University, he joined the J1 League club Yokohama F. Marinos in 2000. However he did not play at all. In 2001, he moved to the Prefectural Leagues club Gunma FC Horikoshi (later FC Horikoshi). The club was promoted to the Regional Leagues in 2002 and the Japan Football League in 2004. He played many matches as a regular player until 2005. In 2006, he moved to the J2 League club Kashiwa Reysol. He became a regular player as a right side back in late 2006 and the club was promoted to J1 in 2007. In 2008, the club won second place in the Emperor's Cup.

However his opportunity to play decreased from 2009 and the club was relegated to J2 in 2010. Although the club returned to J1 in a year and won the championship in 2011, he did not play much. In 2012, he moved to the J2 club Roasso Kumamoto. He became a regular player as a right side back in 2012. Although his opportunity to play decreased a little in 2013, he played many matches until 2016. In 2017, he moved to the Regional Leagues club Suzuka Unlimited FC. He retired at the end of the 2018 season.

== Coaching career ==
In September 2017, when Kurakawa played for Regional Leagues club Suzuka Unlimited FC, he became a playing manager. He managed the club until end of 2017 season.

== Club statistics ==
Updated to 1 January 2019.

Club performance			League		Cup		League Cup		Total	
Season	Club	League	Apps	Goals	Apps	Goals	Apps	Goals	Apps	Goals
Japan			League		Emperor's Cup		J.League Cup		Total	
2000	Yokohama F. Marinos	J1 League	0	0	0	0	0	0	0	0
2001	Gunma FC Horikoshi	Gunma PL (Div. 1)			2	3	-		2	3
2002	Gunma FC Horikoshi	JRL (Kantō)			2	0	-		2	0
2003	Gunma FC Horikoshi	JRL (Kantō)			-		-			
2004	Gunma FC Horikoshi	JFL	29	4	4	1	-		33	5
2005	FC Horikoshi	JFL	25	6	3	0	-		28	6
2006	Kashiwa Reysol	J2 League	16	2	1	0	-		17	2
2007	Kashiwa Reysol	J1 League	28	1	1	0	3	1	32	2
2008	Kashiwa Reysol	J1 League	32	1	2	0	5	0	39	1
2009	Kashiwa Reysol	J1 League	15	0	1	0	3	0	19	0
2010	Kashiwa Reysol	J2 League	15	1	1	0	-		16	1
2011	Kashiwa Reysol	J1 League	1	0	1	0	0	0	2	0
2012	Roasso Kumamoto	J2 League	34	1	3	0	-		37	1
2013	Roasso Kumamoto	J2 League	25	0	1	0	-		26	0
2014	Roasso Kumamoto	J2 League	26	2	0	0	-		26	2
2015	Roasso Kumamoto	J2 League	25	1	0	0	-		25	1
2016	Roasso Kumamoto	J2 League	22	1	0	0	-		22	1
2017	Suzuka Unlimited FC	JRL (Tōkai, Div. 1)	10	0	1	0	-		11	0
2018	Suzuka Unlimited FC	JRL (Tōkai, Div. 1)	8	0	0	0	-		8	0
Total			311	20	23	4	11	1	345	25
