= 2008 Kashiwa Reysol season =

Kashiwa Reysol
2008 season
- Manager: Nobuhiro Ishizaki
- Stadium: Hitachi Kashiwa Soccer Stadium
- J. League 1: 11th
- Emperor's Cup: Runners-up
- J. League Cup: GL-C 2nd
- Top goalscorer: Minoru Suganuma (10)

2008 Kashiwa Reysol season

== Competitions ==
Competitions	Position
J. League 1	11th / 18 clubs
Emperor's Cup	Runners-up
J. League Cup	GL-C 2nd / 4 clubs

== Domestic results ==
=== J. League 1 ===
Match	Date	Venue	Opponents	Score
1	2008..			-
2	2008..			-
3	2008..			-
4	2008..			-
5	2008..			-
6	2008..			-
7	2008..			-
8	2008..			-
9	2008..			-
10	2008..			-
11	2008..			-
12	2008..			-
13	2008..			-
14	2008..			-
15	2008..			-
16	2008..			-
17	2008..			-
18	2008..			-
19	2008..			-
20	2008..			-
21	2008..			-
22	2008..			-
23	2008..			-
24	2008..			-
25	2008..			-
26	2008..			-
27	2008..			-
28	2008..			-
29	2008..			-
30	2008..			-
31	2008..			-
32	2008..			-
33	2008..			-
34	2008..			-

=== Emperor's Cup ===
Match	Date	Venue	Opponents	Score
4th Round	2008..			-
5th Round	2008..			-
Quarterfinals	2008..			-
Semifinals	2008..			-
Final	2008..			-

=== J. League Cup ===
Match	Date	Venue	Opponents	Score
GL-C-1	2008..			-
GL-C-2	2008..			-
GL-C-3	2008..			-
GL-C-4	2008..			-
GL-C-5	2008..			-
GL-C-6	2008..			-

== Player statistics ==
No.	Pos.	Player	D.o.B. (Age)	Height / Weight	J. League 1		Emperor's Cup		J. League Cup		Total	
No.	Pos.	Player	D.o.B. (Age)	Height / Weight	Apps	Goals	Apps	Goals	Apps	Goals	Apps	Goals
1	GK	Kazushige Kirihata	June 30, 1987 (aged 20)	cm / kg	0	0						
2	DF	Jiro Kamata	July 28, 1985 (aged 22)	cm / kg	26	1						
3	DF	Naoya Kondo	October 3, 1983 (aged 24)	cm / kg	5	0						
4	DF	Naoki Ishikawa	September 13, 1985 (aged 22)	cm / kg	17	1						
5	DF	Masahiro Koga	September 8, 1978 (aged 29)	cm / kg	29	1						
6	DF	Alex	April 16, 1983 (aged 24)	cm / kg	28	5						
7	MF	Hidekazu Otani	November 6, 1984 (aged 23)	cm / kg	33	3						
8	MF	Takehito Shigehara	October 6, 1981 (aged 26)	cm / kg	6	0						
8	FW	Masakatsu Sawa	January 12, 1983 (aged 25)	cm / kg	0	0						
9	FW	Hideaki Kitajima	May 23, 1978 (aged 29)	cm / kg	12	1						
10	FW	França	March 2, 1976 (aged 32)	cm / kg	19	4						
11	FW	Popó	September 1, 1978 (aged 29)	cm / kg	29	4						
13	DF	Yuzo Kobayashi	November 15, 1985 (aged 22)	cm / kg	31	1						
14	MF	Keisuke Ota	July 23, 1981 (aged 26)	cm / kg	34	6						
15	MF	Minoru Suganuma	May 16, 1985 (aged 22)	cm / kg	30	10						
17	MF	Shunta Nagai	July 12, 1982 (aged 25)	cm / kg	7	0						
18	MF	Iwao Yamane	July 31, 1976 (aged 31)	cm / kg	15	0						
19	MF	Shu Abe	June 7, 1984 (aged 23)	cm / kg	1	0						
20	FW	Tadanari Lee	December 19, 1985 (aged 22)	cm / kg	19	4						
21	GK	Yuta Minami	September 30, 1979 (aged 28)	cm / kg	10	0						
22	FW	Tatsuya Suzuki	August 1, 1982 (aged 25)	cm / kg	15	0						
23	DF	Yohei Kurakawa	August 10, 1977 (aged 30)	cm / kg	32	1						
24	MF	Jun Yanagisawa	June 27, 1987 (aged 20)	cm / kg	0	0						
25	DF	Yusuke Murakami	April 27, 1984 (aged 23)	cm / kg	6	3						
26	DF	Takahiro Oshima	April 14, 1988 (aged 19)	cm / kg	1	0						
27	MF	Yuki Otsu	March 24, 1990 (aged 17)	cm / kg	14	0						
28	MF	Ryoichi Kurisawa	September 5, 1982 (aged 25)	cm / kg	11	1						
31	GK	Shinya Kato	September 19, 1980 (aged 27)	cm / kg	0	0						
33	GK	Takanori Sugeno	May 3, 1984 (aged 23)	cm / kg	24	0						
34	MF	Kota Sugiyama	January 24, 1985 (aged 23)	cm / kg	12	1						

== Other pages ==
- (in Japanese) J. League official site
