= 2017 Roasso Kumamoto season =

Roasso Kumamoto
2017 season
- Manager: Hiroyuki Kiyokawa; Tomoyoshi Ikeya
- Stadium: Egao Kenko Stadium
- J2 League: 21st

2017 Roasso Kumamoto season.

== J2 League ==
=== League table ===
Pos	Team	Pld	W	D	L	GF	GA	GD	Pts	Promotion, qualification or relegation
20	Renofa Yamaguchi	42	11	5	26	48	69	−21	38	
21	Roasso Kumamoto	42	9	10	23	36	59	−23	37	
22	Thespakusatsu Gunma (R)	42	5	5	32	32	88	−56	20	Relegation to 2018 J3 League (Note: Direct exchange between J2 and J3 is subject to eligibility of J2-licensed teams in top 2 of 2017 J3 League.)

Updated to match(es) played on 28 November 2017. Source: 2017 MEIJI YASUDA J2 LEAGUE League table
Rules for classification: 1) Points; 2) Goal difference; 3) Goals scored
(R) Relegated

=== Match details ===
J2 League match details
Match	Date	Team	Score	Team	Venue	Attendance
1	2017.02.26	Roasso Kumamoto	2-1	Kamatamare Sanuki	Egao Kenko Stadium	7,027
2	2017.03.05	Fagiano Okayama	1-1	Roasso Kumamoto	City Light Stadium	10,286
3	2017.03.12	Roasso Kumamoto	1-1	Montedio Yamagata	Egao Kenko Stadium	6,628
4	2017.03.19	Avispa Fukuoka	2-1	Roasso Kumamoto	Level5 Stadium	9,008
5	2017.03.26	Roasso Kumamoto	0-1	Oita Trinita	Egao Kenko Stadium	10,056
6	2017.04.01	Nagoya Grampus	5-1	Roasso Kumamoto	Toyota Stadium	11,554
7	2017.04.09	Ehime FC	1-0	Roasso Kumamoto	Ningineer Stadium	3,766
8	2017.04.16	Roasso Kumamoto	2-0	Matsumoto Yamaga FC	Egao Kenko Stadium	13,990
9	2017.04.23	Zweigen Kanazawa	0-2	Roasso Kumamoto	Ishikawa Athletics Stadium	3,322
10	2017.04.29	Roasso Kumamoto	1-4	Yokohama FC	Egao Kenko Stadium	7,816
11	2017.05.03	FC Machida Zelvia	2-1	Roasso Kumamoto	Machida Stadium	3,853
12	2017.05.07	Roasso Kumamoto	1-2	Thespakusatsu Gunma	Egao Kenko Stadium	4,777
13	2017.05.13	Roasso Kumamoto	0-1	Shonan Bellmare	Egao Kenko Stadium	4,579
14	2017.05.17	FC Gifu	1-2	Roasso Kumamoto	Gifu Nagaragawa Stadium	3,650
15	2017.05.21	JEF United Chiba	1-1	Roasso Kumamoto	Fukuda Denshi Arena	10,068
16	2017.05.28	Roasso Kumamoto	2-3	Mito HollyHock	Egao Kenko Stadium	5,300
17	2017.06.05	Roasso Kumamoto	0-3	Kyoto Sanga FC	Egao Kenko Stadium	4,533
18	2017.06.11	V-Varen Nagasaki	1-0	Roasso Kumamoto	Transcosmos Stadium Nagasaki	4,618
19	2017.06.17	Tokushima Vortis	3-0	Roasso Kumamoto	Pocarisweat Stadium	3,873
20	2017.06.25	Roasso Kumamoto	0-2	Renofa Yamaguchi FC	Egao Kenko Stadium	4,568
21	2017.07.01	Roasso Kumamoto	4-0	Tokyo Verdy	Egao Kenko Stadium	10,208
22	2017.07.08	Mito HollyHock	2-2	Roasso Kumamoto	K's denki Stadium Mito	4,306
23	2017.07.16	Roasso Kumamoto	1-0	JEF United Chiba	Egao Kenko Stadium	5,692
24	2017.07.22	Thespakusatsu Gunma	1-1	Roasso Kumamoto	Shoda Shoyu Stadium Gunma	3,179
25	2017.07.30	Roasso Kumamoto	0-1	Nagoya Grampus	Egao Kenko Stadium	6,296
26	2017.08.05	Renofa Yamaguchi FC	1-2	Roasso Kumamoto	Ishin Memorial Park Stadium	4,999
27	2017.08.11	Tokyo Verdy	1-0	Roasso Kumamoto	Ajinomoto Stadium	4,372
28	2017.08.16	Roasso Kumamoto	0-0	FC Gifu	Egao Kenko Stadium	4,188
29	2017.08.20	Shonan Bellmare	0-0	Roasso Kumamoto	Shonan BMW Stadium Hiratsuka	8,027
30	2017.08.27	Roasso Kumamoto	0-1	Fagiano Okayama	Egao Kenko Stadium	4,517
31	2017.09.02	Roasso Kumamoto	0-1	FC Machida Zelvia	Egao Kenko Stadium	3,944
32	2017.09.10	Kamatamare Sanuki	0-0	Roasso Kumamoto	Pikara Stadium	3,208
33	2017.09.18	Roasso Kumamoto	1-1	Avispa Fukuoka	Egao Kenko Stadium	5,202
34	2017.09.24	Montedio Yamagata	0-1	Roasso Kumamoto	ND Soft Stadium Yamagata	5,877
35	2017.10.01	Roasso Kumamoto	2-1	Ehime FC	Egao Kenko Stadium	4,005
36	2017.10.07	Matsumoto Yamaga FC	1-0	Roasso Kumamoto	Matsumotodaira Park Stadium	11,026
37	2017.10.14	Kyoto Sanga FC	2-1	Roasso Kumamoto	Kyoto Nishikyogoku Athletic Stadium	7,483
38	2017.10.22	Roasso Kumamoto	1-1	Tokushima Vortis	Egao Kenko Stadium	7,153
39	2017.10.28	Roasso Kumamoto	0-2	V-Varen Nagasaki	Egao Kenko Stadium	7,635
40	2017.11.05	Yokohama FC	2-0	Roasso Kumamoto	NHK Spring Mitsuzawa Football Stadium	8,955
41	2017.11.11	Roasso Kumamoto	1-4	Zweigen Kanazawa	Egao Kenko Stadium	9,584
42	2017.11.19	Oita Trinita	2-1	Roasso Kumamoto	Oita Bank Dome	10,146
