= 2009 Ehime FC season =

Ehime F.C.
2009 season
- Manager: Kazuhito Mochizuki; Barbarić
- Stadium: Ningineer Stadium
- J. League 2: 15th
- Emperor's Cup: 2nd Round
- Top goalscorer: Yoshihiro Uchimura (18)

2009 Ehime F.C. season

== Competitions ==
Competitions	Position
J. League 2	15th / 18 clubs
Emperor's Cup	2nd Round

== Player statistics ==
No.	Pos.	Player	D.o.B. (Age)	Height / Weight	J. League 2		Emperor's Cup		Total	
No.	Pos.	Player	D.o.B. (Age)	Height / Weight	Apps	Goals	Apps	Goals	Apps	Goals
1	GK	Yusuke Kawakita	May 13, 1978 (aged 30)	cm / kg	0	0				
2	DF	Yuichi Shibakoya	June 16, 1983 (aged 25)	cm / kg	31	1				
3	DF	Tomoya Kanamori	April 2, 1982 (aged 26)	cm / kg	36	0				
4	DF	Thiago	February 28, 1983 (aged 26)	cm / kg	13	0				
5	DF	Alair	January 27, 1982 (aged 27)	cm / kg	18	1				
6	MF	Daiki Tamori	August 5, 1983 (aged 25)	cm / kg	24	1				
7	MF	Toru Chishima	May 11, 1981 (aged 27)	cm / kg	15	1				
8	FW	Yoshihiro Uchimura	August 24, 1984 (aged 24)	cm / kg	47	18				
9	FW	Josimar	August 16, 1987 (aged 21)	cm / kg	33	7				
11	FW	Toshiya Tanaka	November 12, 1984 (aged 24)	cm / kg	41	3				
13	DF	Eigo Sekine	September 11, 1981 (aged 27)	cm / kg	30	0				
14	DF	Takuya Mikami	February 13, 1980 (aged 29)	cm / kg	29	0				
15	DF	Kohei Matsushita	July 24, 1985 (aged 23)	cm / kg	18	0				
16	MF	Shuichi Akai	September 2, 1981 (aged 27)	cm / kg	50	10				
17	MF	Shunsuke Oyama	April 6, 1986 (aged 22)	cm / kg	46	2				
18	MF	Kenichi Ego	June 7, 1979 (aged 29)	cm / kg	5	0				
19	MF	Ryosuke Ochi	April 7, 1990 (aged 18)	cm / kg	6	0				
20	FW	Susumu Oki	February 23, 1976 (aged 33)	cm / kg	27	2				
21	GK	Hiromasa Yamamoto	June 5, 1979 (aged 29)	cm / kg	45	0				
22	MF	Shigeru Yokotani	May 3, 1987 (aged 21)	cm / kg	45	6				
23	DF	Kenta Yoshikawa	May 16, 1986 (aged 22)	cm / kg	19	0				
24	MF	Shunta Nagai	July 12, 1982 (aged 26)	cm / kg	26	0				
25	MF	Shinsaku Mochidome	April 29, 1988 (aged 20)	cm / kg	7	0				
27	MF	Daisuke Aono	September 19, 1979 (aged 29)	cm / kg	20	1				
28	DF	Ryota Takasugi	January 10, 1984 (aged 25)	cm / kg	22	0				
29	FW	Takeshi Okamoto	May 27, 1991 (aged 17)	cm / kg	1	0				
31	GK	Shinya Kato	September 19, 1980 (aged 28)	cm / kg	7	0				
33	FW	Dodô	June 28, 1990 (aged 18)	cm / kg	7	1				
34	MF	Kazuhito Watanabe	September 1, 1986 (aged 22)	cm / kg	14	0				
35	GK	Akishige Kaneda	February 26, 1990 (aged 19)	cm / kg	0	0				
39	MF	Kenta Uchida	October 2, 1989 (aged 19)	cm / kg	12	0				

== Other pages ==
- (in Japanese) J. League official site
