= 2010 Ehime FC season =

Ehime F.C.
2010 season
- Manager: Barbarić
- Stadium: Ningineer Stadium
- J. League 2: 11th
- Emperor's Cup: 2nd Round
- Top goalscorer: Kenji Fukuda (7)

2010 Ehime F.C. season

== Competitions ==
Competitions	Position
J. League 2	11th / 19 clubs
Emperor's Cup	2nd Round

== Player statistics ==
No.	Pos.	Player	D.o.B. (Age)	Height / Weight	J. League 2		Emperor's Cup		Total	
No.	Pos.	Player	D.o.B. (Age)	Height / Weight	Apps	Goals	Apps	Goals	Apps	Goals
1	GK	Yusuke Kawakita	May 13, 1978 (aged 31)	cm / kg	13	0				
2	DF	Kenta Yoshikawa	May 16, 1986 (aged 23)	cm / kg	4	0				
3	DF	Tomoya Kanamori	April 2, 1982 (aged 27)	cm / kg	10	0				
4	MF	Kazuhito Watanabe	September 1, 1986 (aged 23)	cm / kg	28	0				
5	DF	Alair	January 27, 1982 (aged 28)	cm / kg	31	3				
6	MF	Daiki Tamori	August 5, 1983 (aged 26)	cm / kg	22	0				
7	MF	Shinsaku Mochidome	April 29, 1988 (aged 21)	cm / kg	22	0				
8	MF	Kenta Uchida	October 2, 1989 (aged 20)	cm / kg	20	4				
9	FW	Josimar	August 16, 1987 (aged 22)	cm / kg	27	4				
10	MF	Douglas Rinaldi	August 29, 1979 (aged 30)	cm / kg	0	0				
11	FW	Kengo Ishii	April 2, 1986 (aged 23)	cm / kg	28	3				
13	DF	Eigo Sekine	September 11, 1981 (aged 28)	cm / kg	35	0				
14	DF	Takuya Mikami	February 13, 1980 (aged 30)	cm / kg	12	0				
15	DF	Kohei Matsushita	July 24, 1985 (aged 24)	cm / kg	11	0				
16	MF	Shuichi Akai	September 2, 1981 (aged 28)	cm / kg	35	4				
17	MF	Shunsuke Oyama	April 6, 1986 (aged 23)	cm / kg	18	0				
18	MF	Kenichi Ego	June 7, 1979 (aged 30)	cm / kg	7	0				
19	MF	Ryosuke Ochi	April 7, 1990 (aged 19)	cm / kg	31	1				
20	FW	Susumu Oki	February 23, 1976 (aged 34)	cm / kg	8	1				
21	GK	Hiromasa Yamamoto	June 5, 1979 (aged 30)	cm / kg	23	0				
22	DF	Shogo Kobara	November 2, 1982 (aged 27)	cm / kg	26	2				
23	MF	Kyohei Sugiura	January 11, 1989 (aged 21)	cm / kg	35	3				
24	FW	Kenji Fukuda	October 21, 1977 (aged 32)	cm / kg	29	7				
25	MF	Hiroshi Azuma	May 15, 1987 (aged 22)	cm / kg	0	0				
28	DF	Ryota Takasugi	January 10, 1984 (aged 26)	cm / kg	22	1				
29	FW	Takeshi Okamoto	May 27, 1991 (aged 18)	cm / kg	0	0				
30	MF	Shohei Matsunaga	January 7, 1989 (aged 21)	cm / kg	2	0				
31	GK	Tatsuya Tsuruta	September 9, 1982 (aged 27)	cm / kg	0	0				
35	GK	Akishige Kaneda	February 26, 1990 (aged 20)	cm / kg	0	0				

== Other pages ==
- (in Japanese) J. League official site
