= 2003 Gamba Osaka season =

Gamba Osaka
2003 season
- Manager: Akira Nishino
- Stadium: Osaka Expo '70 Stadium
- J.League 1: 10th
- Emperor's Cup: 4th Round
- J.League Cup: Quarterfinals
- Top goalscorer: Magrão (15)
Home colours	Away colours	Third colours

2003 Gamba Osaka season

== Competitions ==
Competitions	Position
J.League 1	10th / 16 clubs
Emperor's Cup	4th round
J.League Cup	Quarterfinals

== Domestic results ==
=== J.League 1 ===
Match	Date	Venue	Opponents	Score
1-1	2003/3/23	Nishikyogoku Athletic Stadium	Kyoto Purple Sanga	2-1
1-2	2003/4/5	Osaka Expo '70 Stadium	Júbilo Iwata	1-1
1-3	2003/4/12	Ōita Stadium	Oita Trinita	2-3
1-4	2003/4/19	Osaka Expo '70 Stadium	JEF United Ichihara	3-3
1-5	2003/4/26	Sendai Stadium	Vegalta Sendai	2-0
1-6	2003/4/29	Osaka Expo '70 Stadium	Kashima Antlers	1-2
1-7	2003/5/5	Ajinomoto Stadium	FC Tokyo	0-1
1-8	2003/5/10	Osaka Expo '70 Stadium	Kashiwa Reysol	2-3
1-9	2003/5/17	Urawa Komaba Stadium	Urawa Red Diamonds	4-4
1-10	2003/5/25	Osaka Expo '70 Stadium	Shimizu S-Pulse	1-0
1-11	2003/7/5	Kobe Wing Stadium	Vissel Kobe	3-4
1-12	2003/7/13	Osaka Expo '70 Stadium	Cerezo Osaka	0-2
1-13	2003/7/19	Mizuho Athletic Stadium	Nagoya Grampus Eight	1-1
1-14	2003/7/26	Osaka Expo '70 Stadium	Yokohama F. Marinos	1-2
1-15	2003/8/2	Ajinomoto Stadium	Tokyo Verdy 1969	3-2
2-1	2003/8/17	Osaka Expo '70 Stadium	Oita Trinita	1-0
2-2	2003/8/23	Ichihara Seaside Stadium	JEF United Ichihara	1-2
2-3	2003/8/30	Hitachi Kashiwa Soccer Stadium	Kashiwa Reysol	1-1
2-4	2003/9/6	Osaka Expo '70 Stadium	Urawa Red Diamonds	2-1
2-5	2003/9/14	Kusanagi (ja:Shizuoka Stadium県草薙総合運動場陸上競技場)	Shimizu S-Pulse	1-1
2-6	2003/9/20	Osaka Expo '70 Stadium	Vissel Kobe	2-2
2-7	2003/9/23	Osaka Expo '70 Stadium	Tokyo Verdy 1969	2-2
2-8	2003/9/27	International Stadium Yokohama	Yokohama F. Marinos	0-1
2-9	2003/10/4	Kanazawa (ja:石川県西部緑地公園陸上競技場)	Vegalta Sendai	0-1
2-10	2003/10/19	Nagai Stadium	Cerezo Osaka	2-0
2-11	2003/10/25	Osaka Expo '70 Stadium	Nagoya Grampus Eight	3-1
2-12	2003/11/8	Kashima Soccer Stadium	Kashima Antlers	2-2
2-13	2003/11/15	Osaka Expo '70 Stadium	FC Tokyo	1-0
2-14	2003/11/22	Yamaha Stadium	Júbilo Iwata	1-2
2-15	2003/11/29	Osaka Expo '70 Stadium	Kyoto Purple Sanga	5-1

=== Emperor's Cup ===
Match	Date	Venue	Opponents	Score
3rd round	2003..			-
4th round	2003..			-
Quarterfinals	2003..			-

=== J.League Cup ===
Match	Date	Venue	Opponents	Score
GL-C-1	2003..			-
GL-C-2	2003..			-
GL-C-3	2003..			-
GL-C-4	2003..			-
Quarterfinals-1	2003..			-
Quarterfinals-2	2003..			-

== Player statistics ==
No.	Pos.	Player	D.o.B. (Age)	Height / Weight	J.League 1		Emperor's Cup		J.League Cup		Total	
No.	Pos.	Player	D.o.B. (Age)	Height / Weight	Apps	Goals	Apps	Goals	Apps	Goals	Apps	Goals
1	GK	Naoki Matsuyo	April 9, 1974 (aged 28)	cm / kg	30	0						
2	DF	Chiquiarce	April 2, 1971 (aged 31)	cm / kg	16	1						
3	DF	Masao Kiba	September 6, 1974 (aged 28)	cm / kg	28	0						
4	DF	Noritada Saneyoshi	October 19, 1972 (aged 30)	cm / kg	15	0						
5	DF	Tsuneyasu Miyamoto	February 7, 1977 (aged 26)	cm / kg	26	1						
6	DF	Satoshi Yamaguchi	April 17, 1978 (aged 24)	cm / kg	29	2						
7	MF	Yasuhito Endō	January 28, 1980 (aged 23)	cm / kg	30	4						
8	MF	Galeano	March 28, 1972 (aged 30)	cm / kg	5	0						
8	MF	Harison	January 2, 1980 (aged 23)	cm / kg	11	0						
9	FW	Magrão	February 21, 1974 (aged 29)	cm / kg	24	15						
10	MF	Takahiro Futagawa	June 27, 1980 (aged 22)	cm / kg	29	5						
11	FW	Masanobu Matsunami	November 21, 1974 (aged 28)	cm / kg	17	0						
13	MF	Shigeru Morioka	August 12, 1973 (aged 29)	cm / kg	10	0						
14	DF	Toru Irie	July 8, 1977 (aged 25)	cm / kg	13	0						
15	MF	Shinsuke Sakimoto	April 14, 1982 (aged 20)	cm / kg	0	0						
16	FW	Masashi Oguro	May 4, 1980 (aged 22)	cm / kg	26	10						
17	DF	Toru Araiba	July 12, 1979 (aged 23)	cm / kg	25	2						
18	FW	Kota Yoshihara	February 2, 1978 (aged 25)	cm / kg	20	6						
19	MF	Daisuke Aono	September 19, 1979 (aged 23)	cm / kg	0	0						
20	FW	Koki Habata	July 22, 1983 (aged 19)	cm / kg	0	0						
21	MF	Hirotaka Uchibayashi	June 27, 1983 (aged 19)	cm / kg	0	0						
22	GK	Motohiro Yoshida	August 25, 1974 (aged 28)	cm / kg	0	0						
23	GK	Suguru Hino	July 29, 1982 (aged 20)	cm / kg	0	0						
24	MF	Toshihiro Matsushita	October 17, 1983 (aged 19)	cm / kg	5	0						
25	DF	Yusuke Igawa	October 30, 1982 (aged 20)	cm / kg	0	0						
26	FW	Satoshi Nakayama	November 7, 1981 (aged 21)	cm / kg	22	3						
27	MF	Hideo Hashimoto	May 21, 1979 (aged 23)	cm / kg	23	1						
28	DF	Arata Kodama	October 8, 1982 (aged 20)	cm / kg	9	0						
30	DF	Ryota Aoki	August 19, 1984 (aged 18)	cm / kg	0	0						
31	GK	Atsushi Kimura	May 1, 1984 (aged 18)	cm / kg	0	0						
32	DF	Daisuke Yano	October 26, 1984 (aged 18)	cm / kg	0	0						
33	MF	Ryunosuke Okamoto	October 9, 1984 (aged 18)	cm / kg	0	0						
34	DF	Naoki Kogure	June 14, 1984 (aged 18)	cm / kg	0	0						

== Other pages ==
- (in Japanese) J. League official site
