= Toru Chishima =

Japanese footballer

Toru Chishima 千島 徹
Personal information
- Full name: Toru Chishima
- Date of birth: May 11, 1981 (age 45)
- Place of birth: Kawagoe, Saitama, Japan
- Height: 1.70 m (5 ft 7 in)
- Position: Midfielder

Youth career
- 1997–1999: Urawa Reds

Senior career*
Years	Team	Apps	(Gls)
2000–2006	Urawa Reds	11	(0)
2006–2009	Ehime FC	43	(2)
Total		54	(2)
Medal record
Urawa Reds
Winner	J1 League	2006
Runner-up	J1 League	2004
Runner-up	J1 League	2005
Winner	J.League Cup	2003
Runner-up	J.League Cup	2002
Runner-up	J.League Cup	2004
Winner	Emperor's Cup	2005
Winner	Emperor's Cup	2006
- * Club domestic league appearances and goals

Toru Chishima (千島 徹, Chishima Tōru; born May 11, 1981) is a former Japanese football player.

== Playing career ==
Chishima was born in Kawagoe on May 11, 1981. He joined J2 League club Urawa Reds from youth team in 2000. On April 12, he debuted as substitute midfielder from the 55th minute against Kawasaki Frontale in J.League Cup. Although the club was promoted to J1 League from 2001, he could hardly play in the match until 2001. From 2002, he played several matches every season until 2004. However he could not play at all in the match from 2005. In June 2006, he moved to newly was promoted to J2 club, Ehime FC and played many matches as substitute midfielder. However he injured his left knee in May 2007 and he could not play until late 2008. He played as substitute midfielder in 2009 and retired end of 2009 season.

== Club statistics ==
Club performance			League		Cup		League Cup		Total	
Season	Club	League	Apps	Goals	Apps	Goals	Apps	Goals	Apps	Goals
Japan			League		Emperor's Cup		J.League Cup		Total	
2000	Urawa Reds	J2 League	0	0	1	0	1	0	2	0
2001	Urawa Reds	J1 League	0	0	0	0	0	0	0	0
2002	Urawa Reds	J1 League	2	0	0	0	1	0	3	0
2003	Urawa Reds	J1 League	8	0	1	0	2	1	11	1
2004	Urawa Reds	J1 League	1	0	0	0	4	0	5	0
2005	Urawa Reds	J1 League	0	0	0	0	0	0	0	0
2006	Urawa Reds	J1 League	0	0	0	0	0	0	0	0
2006	Ehime FC	J2 League	18	1	2	0	-		20	1
2007	Ehime FC	J2 League	8	0	0	0	-		8	0
2008	Ehime FC	J2 League	2	0	0	0	-		2	0
2009	Ehime FC	J2 League	15	1	0	0	-		15	1
Total			54	2	4	0	8	1	66	3
