= 2016 Roasso Kumamoto season =

Roasso Kumamoto
2016 season
- Manager: Hiroyuki Kiyokawa
- Stadium: Umakana-Yokana Stadium
- J2 League: 16th

2016 Roasso Kumamoto season.

== J2 League ==
=== League table ===
Pos	Team	Pld	W	D	L	GF	GA	GD	Pts
15	V-Varen Nagasaki	42	10	17	15	39	51	−12	47
16	Roasso Kumamoto	42	12	10	20	38	53	−15	46
17	Thespakusatsu Gunma	42	11	12	19	52	66	−14	45

Updated to match(es) played on 20 November 2016. Source: 2016 MEIJI YASUDA J2 LEAGUE League table
Rules for classification: 1) Points; 2) Goal difference; 3) Goals scored

=== Match details ===
J2 League match details
Match	Date	Team	Score	Team	Venue	Attendance
1	2016.02.28	Roasso Kumamoto	1-0	Matsumoto Yamaga FC	Umakana-Yokana Stadium	8,253
2	2016.03.06	Tokushima Vortis	0-1	Roasso Kumamoto	Pocarisweat Stadium	4,413
3	2016.03.13	Roasso Kumamoto	1-0	Tokyo Verdy	Umakana-Yokana Stadium	5,902
4	2016.03.20	Giravanz Kitakyushu	1-1	Roasso Kumamoto	Honjo Stadium	3,951
5	2016.03.26	V-Varen Nagasaki	0-2	Roasso Kumamoto	Nagasaki Stadium	4,146
6	2016.04.03	Roasso Kumamoto	0-2	Shimizu S-Pulse	Umakana-Yokana Stadium	9,727
7	2016.04.09	Roasso Kumamoto	1-2	Renofa Yamaguchi FC	Umakana-Yokana Stadium	6,731
13	2016.05.15	JEF United Chiba	2-0	Roasso Kumamoto	Fukuda Denshi Arena	14,163
14	2016.05.22	Roasso Kumamoto	0-1	Mito HollyHock	Hitachi Kashiwa Stadium	8,201
15	2016.05.28	Roasso Kumamoto	0-2	FC Machida Zelvia	Noevir Stadium Kobe	2,509
16	2016.06.04	Fagiano Okayama	2-1	Roasso Kumamoto	City Light Stadium	7,308
17	2016.06.08	Roasso Kumamoto	5-2	Zweigen Kanazawa	Best Amenity Stadium	2,638
18	2016.06.12	Thespakusatsu Gunma	1-1	Roasso Kumamoto	Shoda Shoyu Stadium Gunma	4,710
19	2016.06.19	Roasso Kumamoto	2-0	Kamatamare Sanuki	Best Amenity Stadium	5,191
20	2016.06.26	FC Gifu	2-3	Roasso Kumamoto	Gifu Nagaragawa Stadium	4,507
8	2016.06.29	Kyoto Sanga FC	1-1	Roasso Kumamoto	Kyoto Nishikyogoku Athletic Stadium	2,884
21	2016.07.03	Roasso Kumamoto	1-5	Cerezo Osaka	Umakana-Yokana Stadium	9,322
10	2016.07.06	Montedio Yamagata	4-1	Roasso Kumamoto	ND Soft Stadium Yamagata	3,303
22	2016.07.10	Shimizu S-Pulse	4-0	Roasso Kumamoto	IAI Stadium Nihondaira	10,553
23	2016.07.16	Yokohama FC	1-1	Roasso Kumamoto	NHK Spring Mitsuzawa Football Stadium	3,296
24	2016.07.20	Roasso Kumamoto	1-0	Tokushima Vortis	Umakana-Yokana Stadium	3,701
25	2016.07.24	Zweigen Kanazawa	0-0	Roasso Kumamoto	Ishikawa Athletics Stadium	3,304
26	2016.07.31	Tokyo Verdy	1-0	Roasso Kumamoto	Ajinomoto Stadium	5,723
27	2016.08.07	Roasso Kumamoto	1-2	V-Varen Nagasaki	Umakana-Yokana Stadium	6,572
28	2016.08.11	Mito HollyHock	1-1	Roasso Kumamoto	K's denki Stadium Mito	4,952
29	2016.08.14	Roasso Kumamoto	3-0	JEF United Chiba	Umakana-Yokana Stadium	4,538
30	2016.08.21	Roasso Kumamoto	1-6	Giravanz Kitakyushu	Umakana-Yokana Stadium	4,549
12	2016.08.25	Hokkaido Consadole Sapporo	1-0	Roasso Kumamoto	Sapporo Dome	9,834
11	2016.08.31	Roasso Kumamoto	1-2	Ehime FC	Umakana-Yokana Stadium	2,562
9	2016.09.07	Roasso Kumamoto	0-1	Yokohama FC	Umakana-Yokana Stadium	3,108
31	2016.09.11	Ehime FC	1-0	Roasso Kumamoto	Ningineer Stadium	2,955
32	2016.09.18	Roasso Kumamoto	0-0	Fagiano Okayama	Umakana-Yokana Stadium	4,404
33	2016.09.25	Roasso Kumamoto	0-0	Montedio Yamagata	Umakana-Yokana Stadium	4,341
34	2016.10.02	Renofa Yamaguchi FC	0-2	Roasso Kumamoto	Shimonoseki Stadium	7,609
35	2016.10.08	Roasso Kumamoto	1-1	Thespakusatsu Gunma	Umakana-Yokana Stadium	4,281
36	2016.10.16	FC Machida Zelvia	1-0	Roasso Kumamoto	Machida Stadium	4,218
37	2016.10.23	Kamatamare Sanuki	0-0	Roasso Kumamoto	Pikara Stadium	2,524
38	2016.10.30	Roasso Kumamoto	2-0	Hokkaido Consadole Sapporo	Umakana-Yokana Stadium	7,880
39	2016.11.03	Matsumoto Yamaga FC	1-0	Roasso Kumamoto	Matsumotodaira Park Stadium	13,241
40	2016.11.06	Roasso Kumamoto	1-2	Kyoto Sanga FC	Umakana-Yokana Stadium	5,686
41	2016.11.12	Roasso Kumamoto	1-0	FC Gifu	Umakana-Yokana Stadium	6,306
42	2016.11.20	Cerezo Osaka	1-0	Roasso Kumamoto	Kincho Stadium	11,452
