= Yusuke Kawakita =

Japanese footballer

Yusuke Kawakita 川北 裕介
Personal information
- Full name: Yusuke Kawakita
- Date of birth: May 13, 1978 (age 48)
- Place of birth: Osaka, Japan
- Height: 1.84 m (6 ft 1/2 in)
- Position: Goalkeeper

Team information
- Current team: Thailand U23 (goalkeeper coach)

Youth career
- 1994–1996: Seifu High School
- 1997–2000: Kansai University

Senior career*
Years	Team	Apps	(Gls)
2001–2002	Ventforet Kofu	22	(0)
2003–2005	Tokushima Vortis	39	(0)
2006–2012	Ehime FC	109	(0)
Total		170	(0)

Managerial career
- 2023–: Thailand U23 (goalkeeper coach)
- * Club domestic league appearances and goals

Yusuke Kawakita (川北 裕介, Kawakita Yusuke; born May 13, 1978) is a Japanese football coach and former football player, who is the goalkeeper coach of Thailand U23.

== Playing career ==
Kawakita was born in Osaka Prefecture on May 13, 1978. After graduating from Kansai University, he joined J2 League club Ventforet Kofu in 2001. Although he played many matches from first season, he could not become a regular goalkeeper behind Hiromasa Azuma (2001) and Tatsuya Tsuruta (2002). In 2003, he moved to Japan Football League club Otsuka Pharmaceutical (later Tokushima Vortis). He became a regular goalkeeper in 2003. However his opportunity to play decreased from 2004. Although the club won the champions in 2004 season and was promoted to J2, he could not play at all in the match in 2005. In 2006, Kawakita moved to newly was promoted to J2 League club, Ehime FC. He battles with many goalkeeper for the position and played many matches every season and became a regular goalkeeper in 2011. However he could not play at all in the match behind new goalkeeper Yota Akimoto in 2012 and retired end of 2012 season.

== Career statistics ==
Appearances and goals by club, season and competition
Club	Season	League			Emperor's Cup		J.League Cup		Total	
Club	Season	Division	Apps	Goals	Apps	Goals	Apps	Goals	Apps	Goals
Ventforet Kofu	2001	J2 League	13	0	3	0	0	0	16	0
Ventforet Kofu	2002	J2 League	9	0	0	0	—		9	0
Otsuka Pharmaceutical	2003	Football League	29	0	3	0	—		32	0
Otsuka Pharmaceutical	2004	Football League	10	0	0	0	—		10	0
Tokushima Vortis	2005	J2 League	0	0	0	0	—		0	0
Ehime FC	2006	J2 League	24	0	2	0	—		26	0
Ehime FC	2007	J2 League	19	0	4	0	—		23	0
Ehime FC	2008	J2 League	21	0	2	0	—		23	0
Ehime FC	2009	J2 League	0	0	0	0	—		0	0
Ehime FC	2010	J2 League	13	0	0	0	—		13	0
Ehime FC	2011	J2 League	32	0	2	0	—		34	0
Ehime FC	2012	J2 League	0	0	0	0	—		0	0
Career total			170	0	16	0	0	0	186	0
