= 2009 Kashiwa Reysol season =

Kashiwa Reysol
2009 season
- Manager: Shinichiro Takahashi; Nelsinho
- Stadium: Hitachi Kashiwa Soccer Stadium
- J. League 1: 16th
- Emperor's Cup: 3rd Round
- J. League Cup: GL-B 3rd
- Top goalscorer: França (10)

2009 Kashiwa Reysol season

== Competitions ==
Competitions	Position
J. League 1	16th / 18 clubs
Emperor's Cup	3rd Round
J. League Cup	GL-B 3rd / 7 clubs

== Player statistics ==
No.	Pos.	Player	D.o.B. (Age)	Height / Weight	J. League 1		Emperor's Cup		J. League Cup		Total	
No.	Pos.	Player	D.o.B. (Age)	Height / Weight	Apps	Goals	Apps	Goals	Apps	Goals	Apps	Goals
1	GK	Kazushige Kirihata	June 30, 1987 (aged 21)	cm / kg	0	0						
2	DF	Jiro Kamata	July 28, 1985 (aged 23)	cm / kg	11	0						
3	DF	Naoya Kondo	October 3, 1983 (aged 25)	cm / kg	22	0						
4	DF	Naoki Ishikawa	September 13, 1985 (aged 23)	cm / kg	12	1						
5	DF	Masahiro Koga	September 8, 1978 (aged 30)	cm / kg	20	2						
6	MF	Alceu	May 7, 1984 (aged 24)	cm / kg	0	0						
6	DF	Park Dong-Hyuk	April 18, 1979 (aged 29)	cm / kg	14	0						
7	MF	Hidekazu Otani	November 6, 1984 (aged 24)	cm / kg	20	1						
8	FW	Masakatsu Sawa	January 12, 1983 (aged 26)	cm / kg	9	0						
9	FW	Hideaki Kitajima	May 23, 1978 (aged 30)	cm / kg	22	4						
10	FW	França	March 2, 1976 (aged 33)	cm / kg	23	10						
11	FW	Popó	September 1, 1978 (aged 30)	cm / kg	25	4						
13	DF	Yuzo Kobayashi	November 15, 1985 (aged 23)	cm / kg	29	0						
14	MF	Keisuke Ota	July 23, 1981 (aged 27)	cm / kg	7	0						
15	MF	Minoru Suganuma	May 16, 1985 (aged 23)	cm / kg	30	4						
16	FW	Anselmo Ramon	June 23, 1988 (aged 20)	cm / kg	5	0						
17	MF	Shunta Nagai	July 12, 1982 (aged 26)	cm / kg	1	0						
18	MF	Iwao Yamane	July 31, 1976 (aged 32)	cm / kg	12	0						
19	MF	Shu Abe	June 7, 1984 (aged 24)	cm / kg	1	0						
20	FW	Tadanari Lee	December 19, 1985 (aged 23)	cm / kg	20	2						
21	GK	Yuta Minami	September 30, 1979 (aged 29)	cm / kg	0	0						
22	DF	Wataru Hashimoto	September 14, 1986 (aged 22)	cm / kg	4	0						
23	DF	Yohei Kurakawa	August 10, 1977 (aged 31)	cm / kg	15	0						
24	MF	Jun Yanagisawa	June 27, 1987 (aged 21)	cm / kg	1	0						
25	DF	Yusuke Murakami	April 27, 1984 (aged 24)	cm / kg	22	4						
26	DF	Takahiro Oshima	April 14, 1988 (aged 20)	cm / kg	0	0						
27	MF	Yuki Otsu	March 24, 1990 (aged 18)	cm / kg	33	6						
28	MF	Ryoichi Kurisawa	September 5, 1982 (aged 26)	cm / kg	32	0						
29	MF	Kohei Higa	April 30, 1990 (aged 18)	cm / kg	1	0						
30	DF	Hiroki Sakai	April 12, 1990 (aged 18)	cm / kg	0	0						
31	GK	Shinya Kato	September 19, 1980 (aged 28)	cm / kg	0	0						
32	MF	Kosuke Taketomi	September 23, 1990 (aged 18)	cm / kg	0	0						
33	GK	Takanori Sugeno	May 3, 1984 (aged 24)	cm / kg	34	0						
34	MF	Kota Sugiyama	January 24, 1985 (aged 24)	cm / kg	22	1						
35	MF	Ren Sengoku	October 2, 1990 (aged 18)	cm / kg	0	0						
36	FW	Masato Kudo	May 6, 1990 (aged 18)	cm / kg	3	0						
37	MF	Masato Yamazaki	May 12, 1990 (aged 18)	cm / kg	1	0						
38	MF	Adebayo Adigun	November 15, 1990 (aged 18)	cm / kg	0	0						
39	MF	Akimi Barada	May 30, 1991 (aged 17)	cm / kg	0	0						
40	MF	Yoshiyuki Kobayashi	January 27, 1978 (aged 31)	cm / kg	10	0						
41	FW	Junya Tanaka	July 15, 1987 (aged 21)	cm / kg	9	0						

== Other pages ==
- (in Japanese) J. League official site
