= Kenichi Ego =

Japanese footballer

Kenichi Ego 江後 賢一
Personal information
- Full name: Kenichi Ego
- Date of birth: June 7, 1979 (age 47)
- Place of birth: Hyogo, Japan
- Height: 1.72 m (5 ft 7 1/2 in)
- Position: Midfielder

Youth career
- 1995–1997: Nagoya Grampus Eight
- 1998–2001: Juntendo University

Senior career*
Years	Team	Apps	(Gls)
2002	Ventforet Kofu	1	(0)
2003–2005	SC Tottori	80	(18)
2006–2010	Ehime FC	123	(6)
Total		204	(24)
- * Club domestic league appearances and goals

Kenichi Ego (江後 賢一, Ego Kenichi; born June 7, 1979) is a former Japanese football player.

== Playing career ==
Ego was born in Hyogo Prefecture on June 7, 1979. After graduating from Juntendo University, he joined the J2 League club Ventforet Kofu in 2002. On July 10, he debuted as a substitute midfielder against Sagan Tosu, which was the only match he played in 2002. In 2003, he moved to the Japan Football League club SC Tottori. He became a regular player and played often during the next three seasons. In 2006, he moved to the newly promoted J2 League club, Ehime FC. He played often as a regular player. However, he did not play as much in 2009 and retired at the end of the 2010 season.

== Club statistics ==
Club performance			League		Cup		Total	
Season	Club	League	Apps	Goals	Apps	Goals	Apps	Goals
Japan			League		Emperor's Cup		Total	
2002	Ventforet Kofu	J2 League	1	0	0	0	1	0
2003	SC Tottori	Football League	25	8	2	0	27	8
2004	SC Tottori	Football League	28	5	2	0	30	5
2005	SC Tottori	Football League	27	5	1	1	28	6
2006	Ehime FC	J2 League	31	2	1	0	32	2
2007	Ehime FC	J2 League	45	1	4	0	49	1
2008	Ehime FC	J2 League	35	3	2	0	37	3
2009	Ehime FC	J2 League	5	0	0	0	5	0
2010	Ehime FC	J2 League	7	0	0	0	7	0
Total			204	24	12	1	216	25
