= Daisuke Aono =

Japanese footballer

Daisuke Aono 青野 大介
Personal information
- Full name: Daisuke Aono
- Date of birth: September 19, 1979 (age 47)
- Place of birth: Saijo, Ehime, Japan
- Height: 1.75 m (5 ft 9 in)
- Position: Midfielder

Youth career
- 1995–1997: Ehime FC
- 1998–2001: Kwansei Gakuin University

Senior career*
Years	Team	Apps	(Gls)
2002–2003	Gamba Osaka	0	(0)
2004	Vissel Kobe	0	(0)
2005–2006	Albirex Niigata	16	(0)
2007–2009	Ehime FC	70	(6)
Total		86	(6)
- * Club domestic league appearances and goals

Daisuke Aono (青野 大介, Aono Daisuke; born September 19, 1979) is a former Japanese football player. He is the head coach of the Ehime FC Junior Youth.

== Playing career ==
Aono was born in Saijo on September 19, 1979. After graduating from Kwansei Gakuin University, he joined the J1 League club Gamba Osaka in 2002. However he did not play in any games over two seasons. Although he moved to Vissel Kobe in 2004, he still did not play. In 2005, he moved to Albirex Niigata. He played often in 2005. However he did not play as much in 2006. In 2007, he moved to the J2 League club Ehime FC, the counterpart to the youth team he played for. He played often over three seasons. He retired at the end of the 2009 season.

== Career statistics ==
Appearances and goals by club, season and competition
Club	Season	League			Emperor's Cup		J.League Cup		Total	
Club	Season	Division	Apps	Goals	Apps	Goals	Apps	Goals	Apps	Goals
Gamba Osaka	2002	J1 League	0	0	1	0	0	0	1	0
Gamba Osaka	2003	J1 League	0	0	0	0	0	0	0	0
Vissel Kobe	2004	J1 League	0	0	0	0	0	0	0	0
Albirex Niigata	2005	J1 League	16	0	0	0	0	0	16	0
Albirex Niigata	2006	J1 League	0	0	0	0	1	0	1	0
Ehime FC	2007	J2 League	24	2	4	0	—		28	2
Ehime FC	2008	J2 League	26	3	2	0	—		28	3
Ehime FC	2009	J2 League	20	1	1	0	—		21	1
Career total			86	6	8	0	1	0	95	6
