= Kazuyoshi Mikami =

Japanese footballer (born 1975)

Kazuyoshi Mikami 三上 和良
Personal information
- Full name: Kazuyoshi Mikami
- Date of birth: 29 August 1975 (age 51)
- Place of birth: Saitama, Saitama, Japan
- Height: 1.80 m (5 ft 11 in)
- Position: Defender

Youth career
- 1991–1993: Toin Gakuen High School
- 1994–1997: Komazawa University

Senior career*
Years	Team	Apps	(Gls)
1998–2001	Vissel Kobe	45	(0)
2000	→Verdy Kawasaki (loan)	26	(1)
2001	JEF United Ichihara	7	(0)
2002–2003	Yokohama F. Marinos	18	(0)
2004	Oita Trinita	19	(0)
2005–2006	Omiya Ardija	22	(0)
Total		137	(1)
Medal record
Yokohama F. Marinos
Winner	J1 League	2003
Runner-up	J1 League	2002
- * Club domestic league appearances and goals

Kazuyoshi Mikami (三上 和良, Mikami Kazuyoshi; born 29 August 1975) is a former Japanese football player. His younger brother Takuya Mikami is also a football player.

== Playing career ==
Mikami was born in Saitama on 29 August 1975. After graduating from Komazawa University, he joined J1 League club Vissel Kobe in 1998. He played many matches as left side back from first season. In 2000, he moved to Verdy Kawasaki on loan. He battles with Koichi Sugiyama for the position and played many matches. In 2001, he returned to Vissel Kobe. However he could not play at all in the match. In July 2001, he moved to JEF United Ichihara. He played many matches as substitute. In 2002, he moved to Yokohama F. Marinos. Although he played in 2 seasons, he could not play many matches. In 2004, he moved to Oita Trinita. Although he played as regular player, his opportunity to play decreased in late 2004. In 2005, he moved to newly was promoted to J1 League club, Omiya Ardija based in his local. Although he played as regular player, his opportunity to play decreased from late 2005 and he retired at the end of the 2006 season.

== Career statistics ==
Appearances and goals by club, season and competition
Club	Season	League			Emperor's Cup		J.League Cup		Total	
Club	Season	Division	Apps	Goals	Apps	Goals	Apps	Goals	Apps	Goals
Vissel Kobe	1998	J1 League	21	0	1	0	4	0	26	0
Vissel Kobe	1999	J1 League	24	0	1	0	1	0	26	0
Verdy Kawasaki	2000	J1 League	26	1	2	0	6	0	34	1
Vissel Kobe	2001	J1 League	0	0	0	0	0	0	0	0
JEF United Ichihara	2001	J1 League	7	0	0	0	2	0	9	0
Yokohama F. Marinos	2002	J1 League	12	0	0	0	4	0	16	0
Yokohama F. Marinos	2003	J1 League	6	0	0	0	4	0	10	0
Oita Trinita	2004	J1 League	19	0	0	0	6	0	25	0
Omiya Ardija	2005	J1 League	20	0	2	0	7	0	29	0
Omiya Ardija	2006	J1 League	2	0	0	0	2	0	4	0
Career total			137	1	6	0	36	0	179	1
