= Shunta Nagai =

Japanese footballer

Shunta Nagai 永井 俊太
Personal information
- Full name: Shunta Nagai
- Date of birth: July 12, 1982 (age 44)
- Place of birth: Tokyo, Japan
- Height: 1.75 m (5 ft 9 in)
- Position: Midfielder

Youth career
- 1998–2000: Funabashi High School

Senior career*
Years	Team	Apps	(Gls)
2001–2009	Kashiwa Reysol	59	(0)
2004–2005	→Mito HollyHock (loan)	57	(4)
2009	Ehime FC	26	(0)
Total		142	(4)
Medal record
Kashiwa Reysol
Runner-up	Emperor's Cup	2008
Representing Japan
AFC U-19 Championship
Silver medal – second place	2000 Iran
- * Club domestic league appearances and goals

Shunta Nagai (永井 俊太, Nagai Shunta; born July 12, 1982) is a former Japanese football player. His father Yoshikazu is also a footballer.

== Club career ==
Nagai was born in Tokyo on July 12, 1982. After graduating from high school, he joined Kashiwa Reysol in 2001. However, he did not play many matches and he moved to Mito HollyHock in August 2004. He became a regular player. He returned to Reysol in 2006. Although he played many matches until 2007, his opportunity to play decreased from 2008. He moved to Ehime FC in June 2009. He retired end of 2009 season.

== National team career ==
In June 2001, Nagai was selected Japan U-20 national team for 2001 World Youth Championship. But he did not play in the match.

== Career statistics ==
Appearances and goals by club, season and competition
Club	Season	League			Emperor's Cup		J.League Cup		Total	
Club	Season	Division	Apps	Goals	Apps	Goals	Apps	Goals	Apps	Goals
Kashiwa Reysol	2001	J1 League	0	0	0	0	0	0	0	0
Kashiwa Reysol	2002	J1 League	2	0	0	0	4	0	6	0
Kashiwa Reysol	2003	J1 League	10	0	1	0	6	0	17	0
Kashiwa Reysol	2004	J1 League	2	0	0	0	2	0	4	0
Mito HollyHock	2004	J2 League	15	0	2	0	—		17	0
Mito HollyHock	2005	J2 League	42	4	2	0	—		44	4
Kashiwa Reysol	2006	J2 League	19	0	2	0	—		21	0
Kashiwa Reysol	2007	J1 League	18	0	0	0	5	0	23	0
Kashiwa Reysol	2008	J1 League	7	0	0	0	2	0	9	0
Kashiwa Reysol	2009	J1 League	1	0	0	0	0	0	1	0
Ehime FC	2009	J2 League	26	0	1	0	—		27	0
Career total			142	4	8	0	19	0	169	4
