= 2013 Tokyo Verdy season =

Tokyo Verdy
2013 season
- Manager: Yasutoshi Miura
- Stadium: Ajinomoto Stadium
- J2 League: 13th

2013 Tokyo Verdy season.

== J2 League ==
Match	Date	Team	Score	Team	Venue	Attendance
1	2013.03.03	Tokyo Verdy	0-1	Avispa Fukuoka	Ajinomoto Stadium	10,447
2	2013.03.10	Kyoto Sanga FC	0-0	Tokyo Verdy	Kyoto Nishikyogoku Athletic Stadium	7,293
3	2013.03.17	Tokyo Verdy	1-1	Fagiano Okayama	Ajinomoto Stadium	3,951
4	2013.03.20	Giravanz Kitakyushu	1-1	Tokyo Verdy	Honjo Stadium	4,509
5	2013.03.24	Tokyo Verdy	1-1	Roasso Kumamoto	Ajinomoto Stadium	3,291
6	2013.03.31	Tokyo Verdy	3-0	FC Gifu	Ajinomoto Stadium	3,068
7	2013.04.07	Gamba Osaka	0-0	Tokyo Verdy	Expo '70 Commemorative Stadium	10,010
8	2013.04.14	Tokyo Verdy	3-0	Gainare Tottori	Ajinomoto Stadium	3,916
9	2013.04.17	Tokyo Verdy	2-0	Montedio Yamagata	Ajinomoto Stadium	3,057
11	2013.04.28	Kataller Toyama	1-1	Tokyo Verdy	Toyama Stadium	4,883
12	2013.05.03	Tokyo Verdy	1-3	Yokohama FC	Ajinomoto Stadium	15,022
13	2013.05.06	Thespakusatsu Gunma	0-1	Tokyo Verdy	Shoda Shoyu Stadium Gunma	3,856
14	2013.05.12	Tokyo Verdy	2-1	Vissel Kobe	Tokyo National Stadium	7,464
10	2013.05.15	Matsumoto Yamaga FC	0-0	Tokyo Verdy	Matsumotodaira Park Stadium	8,855
15	2013.05.19	Consadole Sapporo	1-1	Tokyo Verdy	Sapporo Atsubetsu Stadium	7,171
16	2013.05.26	Tokushima Vortis	2-1	Tokyo Verdy	Pocarisweat Stadium	3,312
17	2013.06.01	Tokyo Verdy	2-1	Ehime FC	Ajinomoto Stadium	4,268
18	2013.06.08	Tokyo Verdy	0-0	Mito HollyHock	Komazawa Olympic Park Stadium	5,840
19	2013.06.15	V-Varen Nagasaki	2-1	Tokyo Verdy	Nagasaki Stadium	5,678
20	2013.06.22	Tokyo Verdy	3-3	Tochigi SC	Ajinomoto Stadium	4,210
21	2013.06.29	JEF United Chiba	2-1	Tokyo Verdy	Fukuda Denshi Arena	11,425
22	2013.07.03	Tokyo Verdy	0-5	Kyoto Sanga FC	Ajinomoto Stadium	2,539
23	2013.07.07	Gainare Tottori	1-1	Tokyo Verdy	Tottori Bank Bird Stadium	4,330
24	2013.07.14	Tokyo Verdy	2-1	Consadole Sapporo	Ajinomoto Stadium	5,753
25	2013.07.20	Yokohama FC	2-3	Tokyo Verdy	NHK Spring Mitsuzawa Football Stadium	7,324
26	2013.07.27	Tokyo Verdy	3-3	Gamba Osaka	Ajinomoto Stadium	18,705
27	2013.08.04	Avispa Fukuoka	2-3	Tokyo Verdy	Level5 Stadium	5,218
28	2013.08.11	Tokyo Verdy	2-1	V-Varen Nagasaki	Ajinomoto Stadium	3,537
29	2013.08.18	Fagiano Okayama	2-0	Tokyo Verdy	Kanko Stadium	9,762
30	2013.08.21	Vissel Kobe	2-1	Tokyo Verdy	Noevir Stadium Kobe	6,916
31	2013.08.25	Tokyo Verdy	1-3	Matsumoto Yamaga FC	Ajinomoto Stadium	6,544
32	2013.09.01	FC Gifu	1-2	Tokyo Verdy	Gifu Nagaragawa Stadium	4,180
33	2013.09.16	Roasso Kumamoto	2-1	Tokyo Verdy	Umakana-Yokana Stadium	6,102
34	2013.09.23	Tokyo Verdy	1-0	JEF United Chiba	Komazawa Olympic Park Stadium	10,061
35	2013.09.29	Tokyo Verdy	2-1	Thespakusatsu Gunma	Tokyo National Stadium	9,002
36	2013.10.06	Ehime FC	4-0	Tokyo Verdy	Ningineer Stadium	6,060
37	2013.10.20	Tochigi SC	4-2	Tokyo Verdy	Tochigi Green Stadium	4,278
38	2013.10.27	Tokyo Verdy	1-0	Giravanz Kitakyushu	Ajinomoto Stadium	3,761
39	2013.11.03	Tokyo Verdy	1-2	Kataller Toyama	Ajinomoto Stadium	3,988
40	2013.11.10	Mito HollyHock	1-0	Tokyo Verdy	K's denki Stadium Mito	4,773
41	2013.11.17	Tokyo Verdy	1-1	Tokushima Vortis	Ajinomoto Stadium	4,777
42	2013.11.24	Montedio Yamagata	0-0	Tokyo Verdy	ND Soft Stadium Yamagata	7,118
