= Hiroyuki Kiyokawa =

Japanese footballer and manager

Hiroyuki Kiyokawa 清川 浩行
Personal information
- Full name: Hiroyuki Kiyokawa
- Date of birth: June 3, 1967 (age 59)
- Place of birth: Hokkaido, Japan
- Height: 1.80 m (5 ft 11 in)
- Position: Forward

Youth career
- 1983–1985: Hakodate University Yuto High School

Senior career*
Years	Team	Apps	(Gls)
1986–1994	Kashiwa Reysol		

Managerial career
- 2016–2017: Roasso Kumamoto
- * Club domestic league appearances and goals

Hiroyuki Kiyokawa (清川 浩行, Kiyokawa Hiroyuki; born June 3, 1967) is a former Japanese football player and manager.

== Playing career ==
Kiyokawa was born in Hokkaido on June 3, 1967. After graduating from high school, he had a long-time bond with Kashiwa Reysol, for which he played during pre-J1 League era as Hitachi.

== Coaching career ==
After retiring, Kiyokawa became a youth team coach at Kashiwa Reysol. He then moved to Kumamoto, where he has been a coach for Roasso Kumamoto for six seasons before being appointed as head coach in 2016 season. He resigned in June 2017 when the club was at the 19th place of 22 clubs.

== Managerial statistics ==
Team	From	To	Record				
Team	From	To	G	W	D	L	Win %
Roasso Kumamoto	2016	2017	60	16	13	31	26.67
Total			60	16	13	31	26.67
