= 2011 Ehime FC season =

Ehime FC
2011 season
- Manager: Barbaric
- Stadium: Ningineer Stadium
- J2 League: 15 th

The following are the results of Ehime Football Club of Japan's 2011 season.

== J2 League ==
Match	Date	Team	Score	Team	Venue	Attendance
1	2011.03.05	Ehime FC	2-0	Consadole Sapporo	Ningineer Stadium	6,230
8	2011.04.24	Tokyo Verdy	1-2	Ehime FC	Komazawa Olympic Park Stadium	4,516
9	2011.04.30	Ehime FC	0-3	Giravanz Kitakyushu	Ningineer Stadium	3,456
10	2011.05.04	JEF United Chiba	2-1	Ehime FC	Fukuda Denshi Arena	11,834
11	2011.05.08	Shonan Bellmare	1-1	Ehime FC	Hiratsuka Stadium	7,159
12	2011.05.14	Ehime FC	0-1	Tokushima Vortis	Ningineer Stadium	5,622
13	2011.05.22	Tochigi SC	1-2	Ehime FC	Tochigi Green Stadium	3,140
14	2011.05.27	Ehime FC	2-0	FC Gifu	Ningineer Stadium	1,982
15	2011.06.05	FC Tokyo	1-1	Ehime FC	Komazawa Olympic Park Stadium	13,105
16	2011.06.12	Ehime FC	3-2	Gainare Tottori	Ningineer Stadium	2,775
17	2011.06.19	Sagan Tosu	1-2	Ehime FC	Best Amenity Stadium	3,837
18	2011.06.25	Roasso Kumamoto	2-1	Ehime FC	Kumamoto Athletics Stadium	3,877
2	2011.06.29	Thespa Kusatsu	0-0	Ehime FC	Shoda Shoyu Stadium Gunma	1,458
19	2011.07.03	Ehime FC	2-3	Fagiano Okayama	Ningineer Stadium	3,855
20	2011.07.09	Consadole Sapporo	3-1	Ehime FC	Sapporo Atsubetsu Stadium	5,350
21	2011.07.18	Ehime FC	0-2	Kyoto Sanga FC	Ningineer Stadium	2,213
22	2011.07.24	Ehime FC	2-1	Tokyo Verdy	Ningineer Stadium	7,634
23	2011.07.31	Mito HollyHock	3-1	Ehime FC	K's denki Stadium Mito	3,032
3	2011.08.06	Ehime FC	1-0	Kataller Toyama	Ningineer Stadium	2,679
24	2011.08.14	Ehime FC	0-0	Shonan Bellmare	Ningineer Stadium	3,517
25	2011.08.21	Giravanz Kitakyushu	2-2	Ehime FC	Honjo Stadium	5,022
26	2011.08.28	Ehime FC	2-2	Tochigi SC	Ningineer Stadium	2,737
4	2011.09.01	Kyoto Sanga FC	0-0	Ehime FC	Kyoto Nishikyogoku Athletic Stadium	2,386
27	2011.09.11	Yokohama FC	0-1	Ehime FC	Nishigaoka Soccer Stadium	2,731
28	2011.09.17	Ehime FC	0-5	FC Tokyo	Ningineer Stadium	4,269
29	2011.09.24	FC Gifu	1-1	Ehime FC	Gifu Nagaragawa Stadium	2,595
5	2011.09.28	Ehime FC	0-0	Yokohama FC	Ningineer Stadium	2,168
30	2011.10.02	Ehime FC	0-1	JEF United Chiba	Ningineer Stadium	3,246
31	2011.10.16	Ehime FC	1-1	Roasso Kumamoto	Ningineer Stadium	2,869
6	2011.10.19	Oita Trinita	2-1	Ehime FC	Oita Bank Dome	4,859
32	2011.10.23	Fagiano Okayama	1-1	Ehime FC	Kanko Stadium	7,283
7	2011.10.26	Ehime FC	0-1	Mito HollyHock	Ningineer Stadium	1,563
33	2011.10.30	Ehime FC	1-1	Oita Trinita	Ningineer Stadium	2,316
34	2011.11.06	Tokushima Vortis	2-2	Ehime FC	Pocarisweat Stadium	8,421
35	2011.11.12	Ehime FC	2-2	Sagan Tosu	Ningineer Stadium	2,928
36	2011.11.19	Kataller Toyama	2-1	Ehime FC	Toyama Stadium	2,087
37	2011.11.27	Ehime FC	1-2	Thespa Kusatsu	Ningineer Stadium	3,963
38	2011.12.03	Gainare Tottori	2-4	Ehime FC	Tottori Bank Bird Stadium	2,504
