= Kumamoto Suizenji Stadium =

Sports venue in Kumamoto, Japan

Coordinates: 32°47′38″N 130°44′29″E

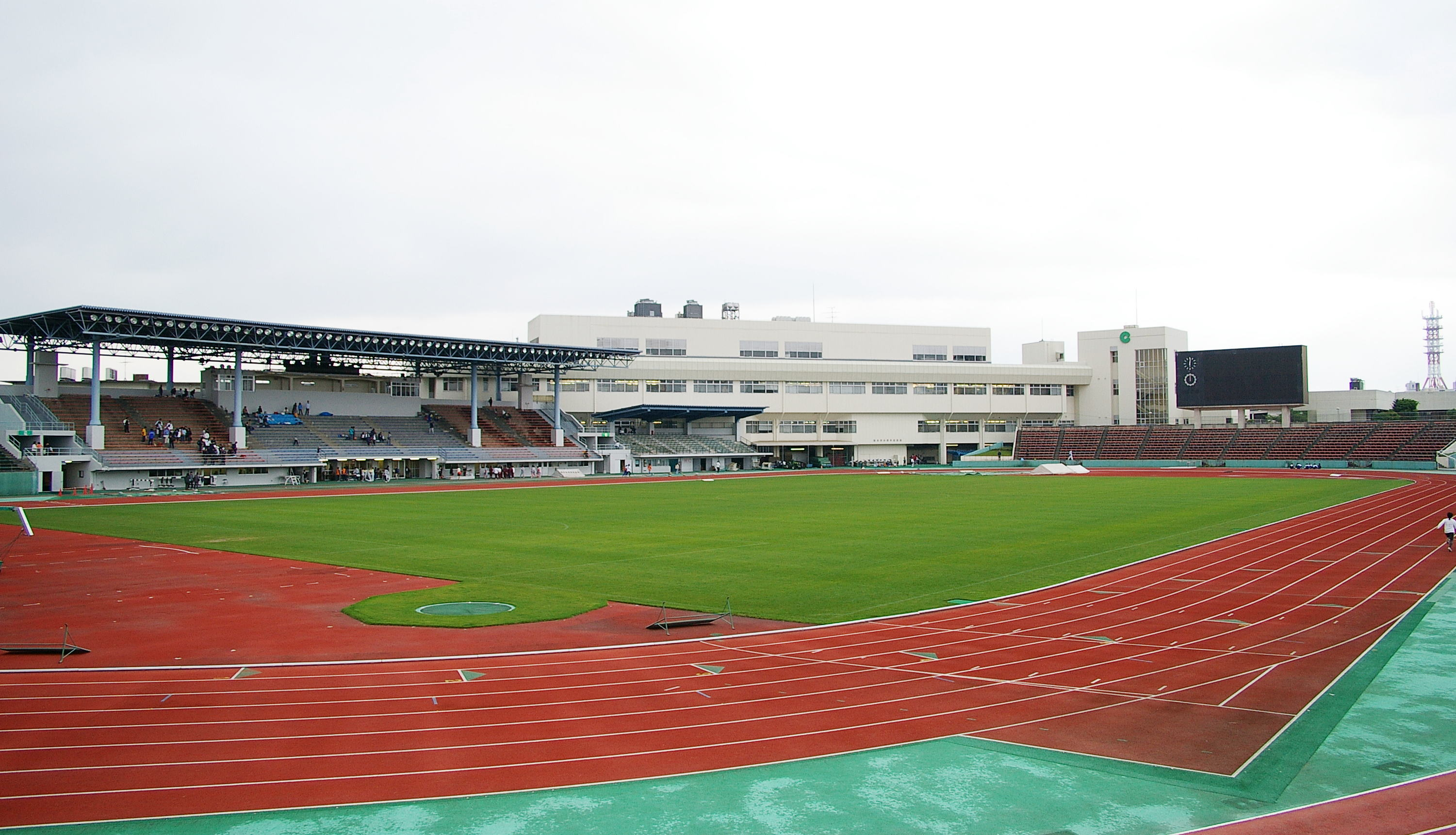
- Interactive map of Kumamoto Suizenji Stadium
- Location: Kumamoto, Kumamoto, Japan
- Owner: Kumamoto City
- Capacity: 15,000

Construction
- Opened: 1960

Kumamoto Suizenji Stadium (熊本市水前寺競技場) is an athletic stadium in Kumamoto, Kumamoto, Japan.
