= Egao Kenko Stadium =

Sports venue in Kumamoto, Japan

- Egao Sta
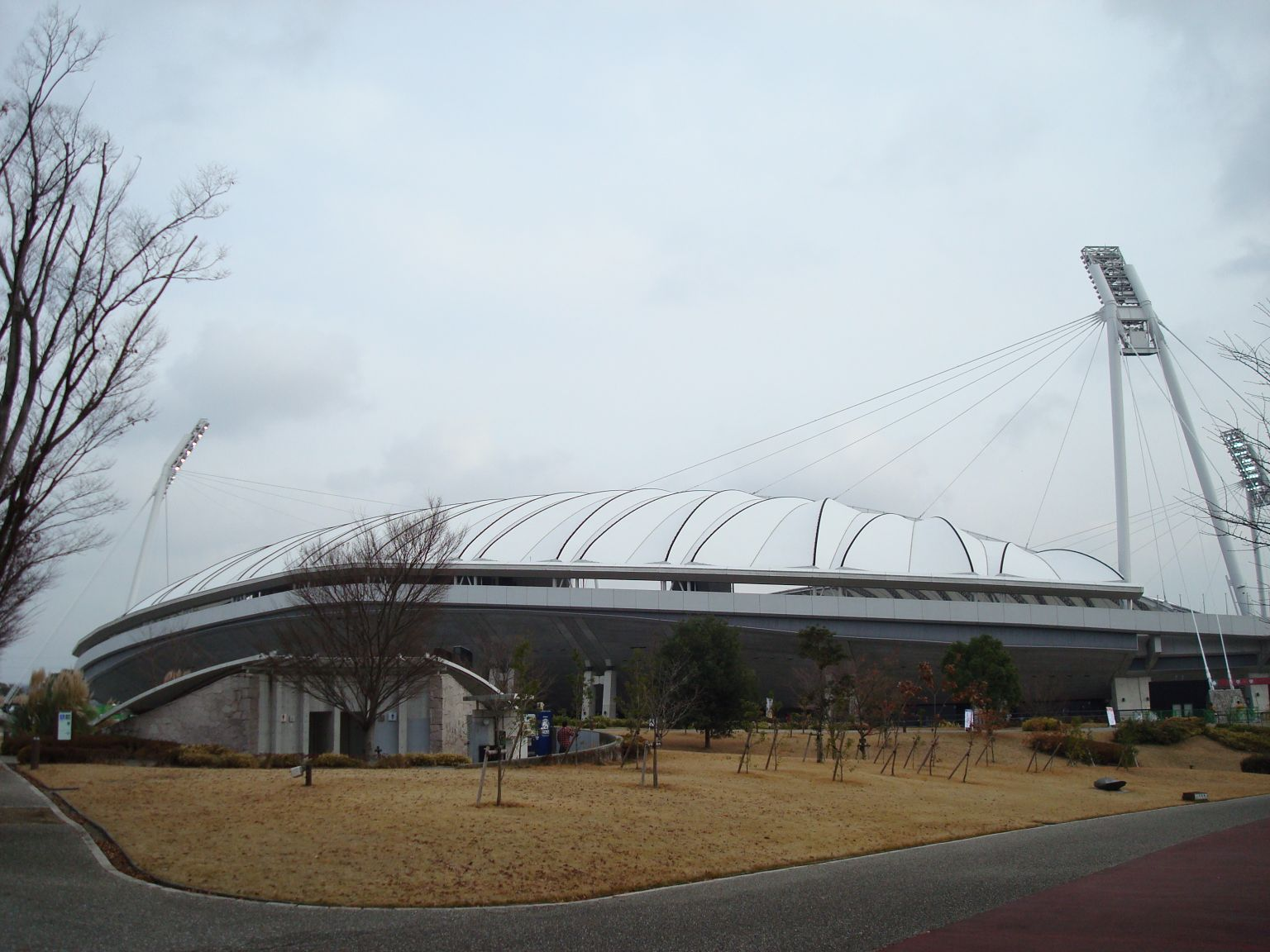
- Interactive map of Egao Kenko Stadium
- Former names: Kumamoto Athletics Stadium (1998–2013); Umakana-Yokana Stadium (2013–2017)
- Location: 2776 Hirayama-cho, Higashi-ku, Kumamoto, Japan 861-8012
- Coordinates: 32°50′13″N 130°48′0″E
- Owner: Kumamoto Sports Promotion Agency
- Capacity: 32,000
- Surface: Grass
- Scoreboard: Diamond Vision
- Field size: 107 x 70 m
- Public transit: JR Kyushu: Hohi Main Line at Hikarinomori

Construction
- Built: 1998
- Opened: March 1998

Tenant
- Roasso Kumamoto

Website
- www.kspa.or.jp/rikujo_english/

Egao Kenko Stadium (えがお健康スタジアム) is a multi-purpose stadium in Higashi-ku, Kumamoto, Japan. It is currently used mostly for association football matches – it is home to J3 League club Roasso Kumamoto – and sometimes for Top League rugby games. The stadium holds 32,000 people.

With Rosso's promotion from the Japan Football League to the J. League Division 2 in 2007, KKWing is expected to play a role in Rosso's ascendancy.

The stadium was used for the 2019 Rugby World Cup, the first Rugby World Cup to be held in Asia.

From 1 February 2017, the stadium adopted a new name as Egao Kenko Stadium (えがお健康スタジアム) (Egao Sta (えがおスタ) in abbreviation) due to naming rights contract.

== 2019 Rugby World Cup ==
| Date | Time | Team #1 | Result | Team #2 | Round |
|---|---|---|---|---|---|
| 6 October 2019 | 16:45 JST | France | 23–21 | Tonga | Pool C |
| 13 October 2019 | 17:15 JST | Wales | 35–13 | Uruguay | Pool D |

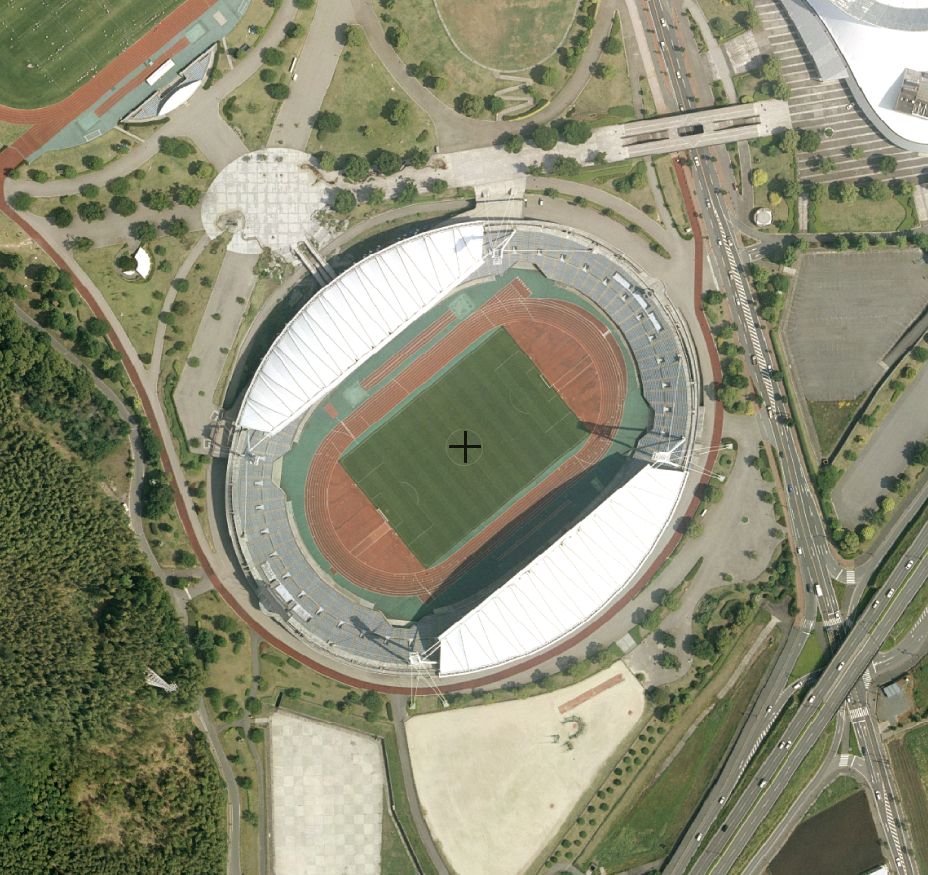
Satellite view

== See also ==
- Park Dome Kumamoto
