= 2012 Ventforet Kofu season =

Ventforet Kofu
2012 season
- Manager: Toshiya Miura
- J.League Division 2: -
- Emperor's Cup: -
Home colours	Away colours

The 2012 Ventforet Kofu season sees Ventforet Kofu return to J.League Division 2 after being relegated from Division 1. This is their 36th non-consecutive season in the second tier of Japanese football, the longest number of seasons for a club in the division. Ventforet Kofu are also competing in the 2012 Emperor's Cup.

After 36 seasons of tries, Ventforet Kofu won their first second-tier title.

== Competitions ==
=== J.League ===
==== League table ====
Pos	Team	Pld	W	D	L	GF	GA	GD	Pts	Promotion or relegation
1	Ventforet Kofu (C, P)	42	24	14	4	63	35	+28	86	Promotion to 2013 J.League Division 1
2	Shonan Bellmare (P)	42	20	15	7	66	43	+23	75	Promotion to 2013 J.League Division 1
3	Kyoto Sanga	42	23	5	14	61	45	+16	74	Qualification for promotion playoffs
4	Yokohama FC	42	22	7	13	62	45	+17	73	Qualification for promotion playoffs
5	JEF United Chiba	42	21	9	12	61	33	+28	72	Qualification for promotion playoffs

Updated to match(es) played on 11 November 2012. Source: J.League Division 2
Rules for classification: 1st points; 2nd goal differential; 3rd goals scored; 4th head-to-head results; 5th disciplinary points; 6th draw. If two clubs are tied for first place, both clubs will be declared champions.
(C) Champions; (P) Promoted

==== Matches ====
4 March 2012 1	Ventforet Kofu	2 – 1	Tochigi SC	Yamanashi Chuo Bank Stadium
Sunday 15:04	Davi 25', 73'	Report	60' Hirose	Attendance: 10,169; Referee: Hayakawa

11 March 2012 2	Tokyo Verdy	1 – 3	Ventforet Kofu	Ajinomoto Stadium
Sunday 16:05	Kobayashi 14'	Report	17' Davi; 60' Sasaki; 80' Katagiri	Attendance: 7,020; Referee: Yoshida

17 March 2012 3	Ventforet Kofu	2 – 1	Ehime FC	Yamanashi Chuo Bank Stadium
Saturday 19:04	Davi 45', 46'	Report	48' Oyama	Attendance: 6,161; Referee: Kawai

20 March 2012 4	Montedio Yamagata	2 – 1	Ventforet Kofu	NDsoft Stadium Yamagata
Tuesday	Nakashima 59'; Miyasaka 84'	Report	47' Kashiwa	Attendance: 5,736; Referee: Inoue

25 March 2012 5	Yokohama FC	0 – 2	Ventforet Kofu	NHK Spring Mitsuzawa Football Stadium
Sunday 14:03		Report	43' Takasaki; 67' Davi	Attendance: 6,071; Referee: Kimura

1 April 2012 6	Ventforet Kofu	1 – 2	Giravanz Kitakyushu	Yamanashi Chuo Bank Stadium
Sunday 16:03	Yamamoto 78'	Report	65' Noborio; 86' Takeuchi	Attendance: 9,486; Referee: Enomoto

8 April 2012 7	Ventforet Kofu	1 – 0	Oita Trinita	Yamanashi Chuo Bank Stadium
17:00	Davi 66' (yellow card) 90+4'; Aoki (yellow card) 72'	Report	Ishigami (yellow card) 24'; Kim Chang-Hun (yellow card) 40'; Miyazawa (yellow card) 79'	Attendance: 9,651; Referee: (Japan) Minoru Tojo

15 April 2012 8	Gainare Tottori	0 – 0	Ventforet Kofu	Tottori Bank Bird Stadium
17:00	Miura (yellow card) 57' (yellow-red card) 85'; Mizumoto (yellow card) 64'; Koide (yellow card) 90'	Report	Sasaki (yellow card) 53' (yellow-red card) 83'; Yamamoto (yellow card) 56'; Takasaki (yellow card) 63'; Fukuda (yellow card) 70'	Attendance: 2,526; Referee: (Japan) Ryuji Sato

22 April 2012 9	Ventforet Kofu	1 – 1	Machida Zelvia	Yamanashi Chuo Bank Stadium
14:00	Ishihara (yellow card) 19'; Davi 21' (pen.); Aoki (yellow card) 90'	Report	Tashiro (yellow card) 9'; Shimoda 11' (yellow card) 39'	Attendance: 7,451; Referee: (Japan) Yudai Yamamoto

27 April 2012 10	Tokushima Vortis	0 – 2	Ventforet Kofu	Pocarisweat Stadium
20:00		Report	Nagasato 33'; Davi 45+1'; Takasaki (yellow card) 83'	Attendance: 2,710; Referee: (Japan) Masaaki Iemoto

30 April 2012 11	Ventforet Kofu	1 – 1	Avispa Fukuoka	Yamanashi Chuo Bank Stadium
17:00	Choi Sung-Kuen (yellow card) 39'; Davi (yellow card) 43' (goal) 47'; Yamamoto (yellow card) 82'	Report	Sakata 34'; Kihara (yellow card) 85'; Suzuki (yellow card) 88'	Attendance: 10,070; Referee: (Japan) Koichiro Fukushima

3 May 2012 12	Shonan Bellmare	1 – 1	Ventforet Kofu	Shonan BMW Stadium Hiratsuka
19:30	Ono (yellow card) 36' (yellow-red card) 67'; Baba 39'; Kobayashi (yellow card) 75'	Report	Ito (yellow card) 27'; Douglas Santos (yellow card) 36'; Kashiwa (yellow card) 36'; Takasaki 52'	Attendance: 8,114; Referee: (Japan) Tomoya Maeda

6 May 2012 13	Ventforet Kofu	0 – 3	Kyoto Sanga	Yamanashi Chuo Bank Stadium
19:30	Davi (yellow card) 19'; Sasaki (yellow card) 75'; Yamamoto (yellow card) 82'	Report	Sanou 5'; Mizutani (yellow card) 33'; Miyayoshi (yellow card) 40' (goal) 68'; Nakayama 49'; Bajalica (yellow card) 66'	Attendance: 9,563; Referee: (Japan) Hiroyuki Kimura

13 May 2012 14	Roasso Kumamoto	0 – 0	Ventforet Kofu	Kumamoto Athletics Stadium
19:30	Harada (yellow card) 26' (yellow-red card) 72'; Fukuo (yellow card) 42'; Saito (yellow card) 62'	Report	Izawa (yellow card) 90'; Matsuhashi (yellow card) 90+1'; Takasaki (yellow card) 90+4'; Douglas Santos (yellow card) 90+4'	Attendance: 4,182; Referee: (Japan) Tetsuro Yoshida

20 May 2012 15	Ventforet Kofu	2 – 0	Thespa Kusatsu	Yamanashi Chuo Bank Stadium
15:00	Douglas Santos 45'; Davi 56'; Morita (yellow card) 59'	Report	Goto (yellow card) 49'	Attendance: 8,739; Referee: (Japan) Tomohiro Inoue

27 May 2012 16	FC Gifu	0 – 3	Ventforet Kofu	Gifu Nagaragawa Stadium
20:00	Someya (yellow card) 38'; Nogaito (yellow card) 48'	Report	Takasaki 2'; Davi (yellow card) 55' (goal) 59'; Matsuhashi (yellow card) 66'; Fukuda 76'	Attendance: 6,151; Referee: (Japan) Haruki Hidaka

2 June 2012 17	Matsumoto Yamaga	1 – 1	Ventforet Kofu	Matsumotodaira Football Stadium
15:00	Tetsuto 22'; Mutsumi Tamabayashi (yellow card) 80'	Report	Sasaki (yellow card) 17'; Davi 37'; Douglas Santos (yellow card) 74'; Yamamoto (yellow card) 90+3'	Attendance: 12,341; Referee: (Japan) Tomoya Maeda

9 June 2012 18	Ventforet Kofu	0 – 2	JEF United Ichihara Chiba	Yamanashi Chuo Bank Stadium
17:00	Douglas Santos (yellow card) 45'; Davi (yellow card) 45+3'	Report	Yonekura 30'; Yamaguchi 34'	Attendance: 10,773; Referee: (Japan) Masaaki Iemoto

13 June 2012 19	Mito HollyHock	1 – 3	Ventforet Kofu	K's denki Stadium Mito
20:00	Omoto (yellow card) 4' (yellow-red card) 73'; Shiotani (yellow card) 51'; Hashimoto 72'	Report	Choi Sung-Kuen (yellow card) 48'; Homma 68' (o.g.); Tsuda (yellow card) 70'; Davi 74' (pen.) 90'; Horigome (yellow card) 82'	Attendance: 2,241; Referee: (Japan) Toshimitsu Yoshida

17 June 2012 20	Ventforet Kofu	4 – 1	Kataller Toyama	Yamanashi Chuo Bank Stadium
19:00	Davi 18'; Tsuda 67'; Takasaki 70', 78'; Sasaki (yellow card) 74'	Report	Fukuda (yellow card) 39' (yellow-red card) 90'; Kimura 57'; Yoshikawa (yellow card) 66'; Onishi (yellow card) 84'	Attendance: 9,562; Referee: (Japan) Kazuyoshi Enomoto

24 June 2012 21	Fagiano Okayama	1 – 1	Ventforet Kofu	Kanko Stadium
19:00	Goto (yellow card) 79'; Kawamata 87'	Report	Sasaki 79'	Attendance: 7,623; Referee: (Japan) Yudai Yamamoto

1 July 2012 22	Ventforet Kofu	0 – 0	FC Gifu	Yamanashi Chuo Bank Stadium
19:00	Choi Sung-Kuen (yellow card) 19'; Renato Luís de Sá Filho (yellow card) 90+1'	Report	Hashimoto (yellow card) 70'; Ri Han-Jae (yellow card) 84'	Attendance: 7,630; Referee: (Japan) Yuki Noda

8 July 2012 23	Machida Zelvia	0 – 1	Ventforet Kofu	Machida Athletic Stadium
19:00		Report	Davi 16'; Yamamoto (yellow card) 38'; Izawa (yellow card) 44'	Attendance: 4,525; Referee: (Japan) Masuya Ueda

15 July 2012 24	Ventforet Kofu	2 – 1	Matsumoto Yamaga	Yamanashi Chuo Bank Stadium
19:00	Kashiwa (yellow card) 23' (yellow-red card) 83'; Davi 25'; Hosaka 60'	Report	Kiyama (yellow card) 24'; Tetsuto 51'; Kusunose (yellow card) 73'	Attendance: 14,150; Referee: (Japan) Yosuke Kubota

22 July 2012 25	JEF United Ichihara Chiba	0 – 1	Ventforet Kofu	Fukuda Denshi Arena
20:00		Report	Davi 18' (yellow card) 75'	Attendance: 11,508; Referee: (Japan) Hiroyoshi Takayama

29 July 2012 26	Ventforet Kofu	3 – 1	Tokyo Verdy	Yamanashi Chuo Bank Stadium
19:00	Nagasato 1'; Hosaka (yellow card) 40' (yellow-red card) 45+1'; Tsuda (yellow card) 65'; Kashiwa 71'; Ishihara 88' (yellow card) 90+2'	Report	Fukatsu (yellow card) 6' (yellow-red card) 26'; Takahashi 52'; Tone (yellow card) 58'; Abe (yellow card) 72'; Koike (yellow card) 90+5'	Attendance: 12,105; Referee: (England) Darren Deadman

5 August 2012 27	Thespa Kusatsu	1 – 2	Ventforet Kofu	Shoda Shoyu Stadium Gunma
20:00	Matsushita 78'	Report	Davi 45', 90' (yellow card) 45+2'	Attendance: 3,622; Referee: (Japan) Hiroyuki Onishi

12 August 2012 28	Ventforet Kofu	1 – 0	Mito HollyHock	Yamanashi Chuo Bank Stadium
19:00	Horigome 8'; Gabriel Pimba (yellow card) 60'; Sasaki (yellow card) 90+2'	Report	Dai (yellow card) 3'	Attendance: 11,342

19 August 2012 29	Kataller Toyama	1 – 1	Ventforet Kofu	Toyama Athletic Stadium
20:30	Kuniyoshi (yellow card) 4' (goal) 16'; Ikehata (yellow card) 13'	Summary	Yamamoto (red card) 27'; Kashiwa 50'	Attendance: 3,034; Referee: (Japan) Yudai Yamamoto

22 August 2012 30	Ventforet Kofu	0 – 0	Montedio Yamagata	Yamanashi Chuo Bank Stadium
20:00		Summary		Attendance: 10,092; Referee: (Japan) Ryuji Sato

26 August 2012 31	Ventforet Kofu	2 – 1	Yokohama FC	Yamanashi Chuo Bank Stadium
19:00	Davi 52', 73' (yellow card) 87'; Izawa (yellow card) 57'; Tsuda (yellow card) 58'	Summary	Horinouchi 28'; Sato (yellow card) 29'	Attendance: 11,875; Referee: (Japan) Jumpei Iida

2 September 2012 32	Oita Trinita	1 – 2	Ventforet Kofu	Ōita Bank Dome
19:00	Mitsuhira 89'	Summary	Hosaka (yellow card) 22'; Davi 28', 90+3'	Attendance: 23,617; Referee: (Japan) Masaaki Iemoto

14 September 2012 33	Ventforet Kofu	1 – 0	Fagiano Okayama	Yamanashi Chuo Bank Stadium
20:00	Davi 60' (yellow card) 82'; Aoki (yellow card) 90+2'	Summary		Attendance: 9,045; Referee: (Japan) Ryoichi Imamura

17 September 2012 34	Ventforet Kofu	1 – 1	Gainare Tottori	Yamanashi Chuo Bank Stadium
17:00	Yamamoto 43'	Summary	Koide 25'; Mori (yellow card) 62'	Attendance: 10,241; Referee: (Japan) Akihiko Ikeuchi

23 September 2012 35	Giravanz Kitakyushu	2 – 3	Ventforet Kofu	Honjō Athletic Stadium
14:00	Arai (yellow card) 14'; Kim Jong-pil 48' (yellow card) 65'; Miyamoto (yellow card) 59'; Yasuda (yellow card) 70'; Tokiwa 77'	Summary	Kashiwa 6' (yellow card) 36'; Davi (yellow card) 82' (goal) 85'; Hatada 90+3'	Attendance: 3,254; Referee: (Japan) Ryuji Sato

30 September 2012 36	Tochigi SC	1 – 2	Ventforet Kofu	Tochigi Green Stadium
14:00	Paulinho (yellow card) 39'; Cha Young-Hwan (yellow card) 45'; Owada 55'; Toma (yellow card) 90'	Summary	Davi 24', 90+2'; Izawa (yellow card) 28'; Yamamoto (yellow card) 45+1'; Kashiwa (yellow card) 48'; Hatada (yellow card) 72'	Attendance: 5,156; Referee: (Japan) Kenji Ogiya

7 October 2012 37	Ventforet Kofu	3 – 2	Tokushima Vortis	Yamanashi Chuo Bank Stadium
15:00	Nagasato 32'; Fernandinho 39'; Davi 50'	Summary	Alex Santos (yellow card) 61' (goal) 88', 90'; Miki (yellow card) 75'; Hashiuchi (red card) 85'; Douglas (yellow card) 90' (yellow-red card) 90+3'	Attendance: 10,741; Referee: (Japan) Eiji Kawai

14 October 2012 38	Ventforet Kofu	2 – 2	Shonan Bellmare	Yamanashi Chuo Bank Stadium
16:00	Fernandinho (yellow card) 37'; Izawa 50'; Davi 62' (pen.); Matsuhashi (yellow card) 85'	Summary	Syuhei Otsuki 28'; Macena (yellow card) 30' (goal) 51'; Shimamura (yellow card) 90+3'	Attendance: 16,643; Referee: (Japan) Nobutsugu Murakami

21 October 2012 39	Avispa Fukuoka	2 – 3	Ventforet Kofu	Level-5 Stadium
14:00	Suzuki (yellow card) 12'; Osmar 27'; Sueyoshi (yellow card) 30'; Koga (yellow card) 34'; Morita 59' (o.g.); Kim Min-Je (yellow card) 67'; Yamaguchi (yellow card) 71'; Tsutsumi (yellow card) 86'	Summary	Davi 22', 29'; Nagasato 44'; Fukuda (yellow card) 77'; Fernandinho (yellow card) 87'	Attendance: 6,144; Referee: (Japan) Yoshiro Imamura

28 October 2012 40	Ehime FC	0 – 0	Ventforet Kofu	Ningineer Stadium
19:00	Arita (yellow card) 19'; Maeno (yellow card) 38'; Urata (yellow card) 55'; Takumi Murakami (yellow card) 59'; Watanabe (yellow card) 60'; Ishii (yellow card) 77'	Summary		Attendance: 3,380; Referee: (Japan) Kazuyuki Hayakawa

4 November 2012 41	Ventforet Kofu	2 – 0	Roasso Kumamoto	Yamanashi Chuo Bank Stadium
13:00	Davi (yellow card) 40'; Izawa 74', 90'	Summary	Ichimura (yellow card) 24'; Fukuo (yellow card) 52' (yellow-red card); Taketomi (yellow card) 77'	Attendance: 13,050; Referee: (Japan) Koei Koya

11 November 2012 42	Kyoto Sanga	0 – 0	Ventforet Kofu	Nishikyogoku Athletic Stadium
13:00	Bajalica (yellow card) 7'	Summary	Yamamoto (yellow card) 16'	Attendance: 12,296; Referee: (Japan) Hiroyoshi Takayama

=== Emperor's Cup ===
8 September 2012 Round 2	Ventforet Kofu	0 – 0 (a.e.t.) (3 – 4 p)	Fukushima United F.C.	Kōfu, Yamanashi
13:00		Report		Stadium: Yamanashi Chuo Bank Stadium; Attendance: 2,004; Referee: Yuki Noda
