= 2009 Ventforet Kofu season =

Ventforet Kofu
2009 season
- Manager: Takayoshi Amma
- Stadium: Kose Sports Park Stadium
- J. League 2: 4th
- Emperor's Cup: 4th Round
- Top goalscorer: Maranhão (19)

2009 Ventforet Kofu season

== Competitions ==
Competitions	Position
J. League 2	4th / 18 clubs
Emperor's Cup	4th Round

== Player statistics ==
No.	Pos.	Player	D.o.B. (Age)	Height / Weight	J. League 2		Emperor's Cup		Total	
No.	Pos.	Player	D.o.B. (Age)	Height / Weight	Apps	Goals	Apps	Goals	Apps	Goals
1	GK	Kota Ogi	May 5, 1983 (aged 25)	cm / kg	44	0				
2	DF	Michitaka Akimoto	September 24, 1982 (aged 26)	cm / kg	31	3				
3	DF	Takafumi Mikuriya	May 11, 1984 (aged 24)	cm / kg	13	0				
4	DF	Hideomi Yamamoto	June 26, 1980 (aged 28)	cm / kg	48	1				
5	DF	Daniel	May 30, 1982 (aged 26)	cm / kg	44	2				
6	DF	Naoki Wako	November 26, 1989 (aged 19)	cm / kg	10	0				
7	MF	Katsuya Ishihara	October 2, 1978 (aged 30)	cm / kg	46	0				
8	MF	Atsushi Mio	January 26, 1983 (aged 26)	cm / kg	20	0				
9	FW	Yohei Onishi	October 30, 1982 (aged 26)	cm / kg	46	8				
10	MF	Ken Fujita	August 27, 1979 (aged 29)	cm / kg	50	2				
11	FW	Maranhão	June 19, 1984 (aged 24)	cm / kg	48	19				
13	MF	Masafumi Maeda	January 25, 1983 (aged 26)	cm / kg	0	0				
14	FW	Hiroshi Morita	May 18, 1978 (aged 30)	cm / kg	41	7				
15	MF	Marcelo Labarthe	August 12, 1984 (aged 24)	cm / kg	0	0				
15	FW	Galvão	July 8, 1982 (aged 26)	cm / kg	10	2				
16	FW	Masaru Matsuhashi	March 22, 1985 (aged 23)	cm / kg	26	4				
17	DF	Takuma Tsuda	October 4, 1980 (aged 28)	cm / kg	8	0				
18	FW	Kim Shin-young	June 16, 1983 (aged 25)	cm / kg	45	14				
19	DF	Yosuke Ikehata	June 7, 1979 (aged 29)	cm / kg	29	3				
20	DF	Yutaka Yoshida	February 17, 1990 (aged 19)	cm / kg	23	0				
21	GK	Tatsuya Tsuruta	September 9, 1982 (aged 26)	cm / kg	0	0				
22	GK	Shogo Tokihisa	April 15, 1984 (aged 24)	cm / kg	0	0				
23	DF	Yuki Toma	March 29, 1987 (aged 21)	cm / kg	0	0				
24	MF	Takahiro Kuniyoshi	May 28, 1988 (aged 20)	cm / kg	16	5				
25	FW	Yuki Koike	April 18, 1986 (aged 22)	cm / kg	0	0				
26	MF	Naoki Hatada	September 11, 1990 (aged 18)	cm / kg	0	0				
27	FW	Junya Kuno	August 16, 1988 (aged 20)	cm / kg	0	0				
28	MF	Hiromu Karasawa	August 24, 1990 (aged 18)	cm / kg	0	0				
29	MF	Atsushi Izawa	July 23, 1989 (aged 19)	cm / kg	8	2				
30	FW	Bruno	February 6, 1989 (aged 20)	cm / kg	2	0				
31	MF	Kentaro Hayashi	August 29, 1972 (aged 36)	cm / kg	27	0				
32	DF	Arata Sugiyama	July 25, 1980 (aged 28)	cm / kg	45	2				
33	FW	Atsushi Katagiri	August 1, 1983 (aged 25)	cm / kg	17	0				
34	GK	Kensaku Abe	May 13, 1980 (aged 28)	cm / kg	7	0				
35	DF	Weberton	July 26, 1990 (aged 18)	cm / kg	0	0				

== Other pages ==
- (in Japanese) J. League official site

Statistical information for the 2009

league.
