= 2010 Ventforet Kofu season =

Ventforet Kofu
2010 season
- Manager: Kazuo Uchida
- Stadium: Kose Sports Park Stadium
- J. League 2: 2nd
- Emperor's Cup: 3rd Round
- Top goalscorer: Mike Havenaar (20)

2010 Ventforet Kofu season

== Competitions ==
| Competitions | Position |
|---|---|
| J. League 2 | 2nd / 19 clubs |
| Emperor's Cup | 3rd Round |

== Player statistics ==
| No. | Pos. | Player | D.o.B. (Age) | Height / Weight | J. League 2 | | Emperor's Cup | | Total | |
| No. | Pos. | Player | D.o.B. (Age) | Height / Weight | Apps | Goals | Apps | Goals | Apps | Goals |
|---|---|---|---|---|---|---|---|---|---|---|
| 1 | GK | Kota Ogi | May 5, 1983 (aged 34) | 184 cm / 76 kg | 28 | 0 | | | | |
| 2 | DF | Michitaka Akimoto | September 24, 1982 (aged 35) | 180 cm / 77 kg | 32 | 7 | | | | |
| 3 | DF | Masaki Yanagawa | May 1, 1987 (aged 30) | 184 cm / 78 kg | 6 | 0 | | | | |
| 4 | DF | Hideomi Yamamoto | June 26, 1980 (aged 37) | 175 cm / 69 kg | 28 | 2 | | | | |
| 5 | DF | Daniel | May 30, 1982 (aged 35) | 186 cm / 79 kg | 32 | 1 | | | | |
| 6 | DF | Yutaka Yoshida | February 17, 1990 (aged 27) | 168 cm / 66 kg | 27 | 0 | | | | |
| 7 | MF | Katsuya Ishihara | October 2, 1978 (aged 39) | 176 cm / 64 kg | 26 | 0 | | | | |
| 8 | MF | Yuji Yabu | May 24, 1984 (aged 33) | 176 cm / 69 kg | 29 | 5 | | | | |
| 9 | FW | Yohei Onishi | October 30, 1982 (aged 35) | 170 cm / 63 kg | 16 | 0 | | | | |
| 10 | MF | Ken Fujita | August 27, 1979 (aged 38) | 167 cm / 58 kg | 32 | 2 | | | | |
| 11 | FW | Maranhão | June 19, 1984 (aged 33) | 175 cm / 74 kg | 26 | 9 | | | | |
| 13 | DF | Toshihiko Uchiyama | October 21, 1978 (aged 39) | 175 cm / 74 kg | 33 | 4 | | | | |
| 14 | FW | Mike Havenaar | May 20, 1987 (aged 30) | 194 cm / 86 kg | 31 | 20 | | | | |
| 15 | FW | Paulinho | July 16, 1982 (aged 35) | 168 cm / kg | 33 | 14 | | | | |
| 16 | FW | Masaru Matsuhashi | March 22, 1985 (aged 32) | 173 cm / 69 kg | 16 | 1 | | | | |
| 17 | DF | Takuma Tsuda | October 4, 1980 (aged 37) | 179 cm / 71 kg | 13 | 0 | | | | |
| 18 | FW | Kim Shin-young | June 16, 1983 (aged 34) | 186 cm / kg | 20 | 1 | | | | |
| 19 | DF | Yosuke Ikehata | June 7, 1979 (aged 38) | 181 cm / 70 kg | 2 | 0 | | | | |
| 20 | FW | Atsushi Katagiri | August 1, 1983 (aged 34) | 177 cm / 68 kg | 15 | 3 | | | | |
| 21 | GK | Hiroki Aratani | August 6, 1975 (aged 42) | 192 cm / 83 kg | 9 | 0 | | | | |
| 22 | GK | Shinya Kato | September 19, 1980 (aged 37) | 187 cm / 78 kg | 0 | 0 | | | | |
| 23 | DF | Yuki Toma | March 29, 1987 (aged 30) | 184 cm / 78 kg | 0 | 0 | | | | |
| 24 | MF | Takahiro Kuniyoshi | May 28, 1988 (aged 29) | 170 cm / 64 kg | 2 | 0 | | | | |
| 25 | FW | Yuki Koike | April 18, 1986 (aged 31) | 178 cm / 75 kg | 5 | 1 | | | | |
| 26 | MF | Naoki Hatada | September 11, 1990 (aged 27) | 172 cm / 66 kg | 1 | 0 | | | | |
| 27 | MF | Yoshifumi Kashiwa | July 28, 1987 (aged 30) | 168 cm / 60 kg | 16 | 1 | | | | |
| 28 | MF | Hiromu Karasawa | August 24, 1990 (aged 27) | 175 cm / 72 kg | 0 | 0 | | | | |
| 29 | MF | Atsushi Izawa | July 23, 1989 (aged 28) | 170 cm / 60 kg | 0 | 0 | | | | |
| 30 | MF | Kazunari Hosaka | March 24, 1983 (aged 34) | 172 cm / 63 kg | 25 | 0 | | | | |
| 31 | GK | Daisuke Matsushita | October 31, 1981 (aged 36) | 180 cm / 75 kg | 0 | 0 | | | | |

== Other pages ==
- (in Japanese) J. League official site
