= Katsuya Ishihara =

Japanese footballer

Katsuya Ishihara 石原 克哉
Personal information
- Full name: Katsuya Ishihara
- Date of birth: 2 October 1978 (age 48)
- Place of birth: Nirasaki, Yamanashi, Japan
- Height: 1.76 m (5 ft 9 1/2 in)
- Position: Midfielder

Youth career
- 1994–1996: Nirasaki High School
- 1997–2000: Juntendo University

Senior career*
Years	Team	Apps	(Gls)
2001–2017	Ventforet Kofu	467	(30)
Total		467	(30)
- * Club domestic league appearances and goals

Katsuya Ishihara (石原 克哉, Ishihara Katsuya; born 2 October 1978) is a former Japanese football player.

== Playing career ==
Ishihara was born in Nirasaki on 2 October 1978. After graduating from Juntendo University, he joined his local J2 League club Ventforet Kofu in 2001. He became a regular player as midfielder from first season and played many matches for a long time. Although Ventforet was at the bottom place in 2001 season, the club results moved up from 2002. In 2005, he played all 44 matches and Ventforet won the 3rd place and was promoted to J1 League first time in the club history. In J1 from 2006 season, he played all matches except 1 match for suspension in 2 seasons. However the club results were bad and was relegated to J2 end of 2007 season. After that, Ventforet repeated relegation to J2 and promotion to J1. Although he played as regular player until 2009, his opportunity to play decreased from 2010. Although Ventforet stayed in J1 from 2013, he could not play many matches except 2014 season. Ventforet was relegated to J2 end of 2017 season. Ishihara also could hardly play in the match in 2017 and retired end of 2017 season.

== Career statistics ==
Appearances and goals by club, season and competition
Club	Season	League			Emperor's Cup		J.League Cup		Total	
Club	Season	Division	Apps	Goals	Apps	Goals	Apps	Goals	Apps	Goals
Ventforet Kofu	2001	J2 League	30	2	3	0	1	0	34	2
Ventforet Kofu	2002	J2 League	40	4	3	1	—		43	5
Ventforet Kofu	2003	J2 League	42	4	1	0	—		43	4
Ventforet Kofu	2004	J2 League	36	3	1	0	—		37	3
Ventforet Kofu	2005	J2 League	44	3	2	0	—		46	3
Ventforet Kofu	2006	J1 League	33	2	3	0	5	1	41	3
Ventforet Kofu	2007	J1 League	34	5	2	1	8	1	44	7
Ventforet Kofu	2008	J2 League	38	2	2	0	—		40	2
Ventforet Kofu	2009	J2 League	46	0	1	0	—		47	0
Ventforet Kofu	2010	J2 League	26	0	0	0	–		26	0
Ventforet Kofu	2011	J1 League	16	1	1	0	0	0	17	1
Ventforet Kofu	2012	J2 League	23	1	0	0	–		23	1
Ventforet Kofu	2013	J1 League	10	0	1	0	1	0	12	0
Ventforet Kofu	2014	J1 League	28	3	3	0	4	0	35	3
Ventforet Kofu	2015	J1 League	13	0	3	0	0	0	16	0
Ventforet Kofu	2016	J1 League	8	0	0	0	0	0	8	0
Ventforet Kofu	2017	J1 League	0	0	0	0	2	0	2	0
Career total			467	30	26	2	21	2	514	34
