= 2003 Ventforet Kofu season =

Ventforet Kofu
2003 season
- Manager: Hideki Matsunaga
- Stadium: Kose Sports Park Stadium
- J. League 2: 5th of 22
- Emperor's Cup: 3rd Round
- Top goalscorer: Takafumi Ogura (10)
Home colours	Away colours

2003 Ventforet Kofu season

== Competitions ==
Competitions	Position
J. League 2	5th / 12 clubs
Emperor's Cup	3rd Round

== League table ==
Pos	Team	Pld	W	D	L	GF	GA	GD	Pts
3	Kawasaki Frontale	44	24	13	7	88	47	+41	85
4	Avispa Fukuoka	44	21	8	15	67	62	+5	71
5	Ventforet Kofu	44	19	12	13	58	46	+12	69
6	Omiya Ardija	44	18	7	19	52	61	−9	61
7	Mito HollyHock	44	15	11	18	37	41	−4	56

Updated to match(es) played on November 23, 2003. Source: J. League Division 2
Rules for classification: 1) points; 2) goal difference; 3) number of goals scored.

== Domestic results ==
=== J. League 2 ===
Match	Date	Venue	Opponents	Score
1	2003.3.15	Kose Sports Stadium	Sagan Tosu	1-1
2	2003.3.21	Mito City Athletic Stadium	Mito HollyHock	0-1
3	2003.3.29	Kose Sports Stadium	Shonan Bellmare	1-0
4	2003.4.5	Todoroki Athletics Stadium	Kawasaki Frontale	1-1
5	2003.4.9	Kose Sports Stadium	Albirex Niigata	1-3
6	2003.4.12	Mitsuzawa Stadium	Yokohama F.C.	5-1
7	2003.4.19	Kose Sports Stadium	Consadole Sapporo	2-1
8	2003.4.26	Ōmiya Park Soccer Stadium	Omiya Ardija	3-0
9	2003.4.29	Hiroshima Stadium	Sanfrecce Hiroshima	0-1
10	2003.5.5	Kose Sports Stadium	Montedio Yamagata	1-2
11	2003.5.10	Kose Sports Stadium	Avispa Fukuoka	2-1
12	2003.5.14	Tosu Stadium	Sagan Tosu	1-1
13	2003.5.17	Kose Sports Stadium	Mito HollyHock	0-2
14	2003.5.24	Hiratsuka Athletics Stadium	Shonan Bellmare	3-0
15	2003.5.31	Kose Sports Stadium	Kawasaki Frontale	0-2
16	2003.6.7	Yamagata Park Stadium	Montedio Yamagata	0-1
17	2003.6.14	Hakata no mori stadium	Avispa Fukuoka	2-1
18	2003.6.18	Kose Sports Stadium	Omiya Ardija	1-2
19	2003.6.21	Sapporo Dome	Consadole Sapporo	3-3
20	2003.6.28	Kose Sports Stadium	Yokohama F.C.	1-1
21	2003.7.2	Niigata Stadium	Albirex Niigata	0-0
22	2003.7.5	Kose Sports Stadium	Sanfrecce Hiroshima	1-0
23	2003.7.19	Kose Sports Stadium	Avispa Fukuoka	0-0
24	2003.7.26	Kasamatsu Stadium	Mito HollyHock	2-1
25	2003.7.30	Kose Sports Stadium	Sagan Tosu	2-0
26	2003.8.3	Todoroki Athletics Stadium	Kawasaki Frontale	1-4
27	2003.8.10	Kose Sports Stadium	Montedio Yamagata	2-1
28	2003.8.16	Kose Sports Stadium	Consadole Sapporo	1-1
29	2003.8.23	Mitsuzawa Stadium	Yokohama F.C.	2-1
30	2003.8.30	Matsumoto Stadium	Albirex Niigata	2-1
31	2003.9.3	Ōmiya Park Soccer Stadium	Omiya Ardija	0-0
32	2003.9.6	Hiroshima Big Arch	Sanfrecce Hiroshima	0-2
33	2003.9.13	Kose Sports Stadium	Shonan Bellmare	2-0
34	2003.9.20	Sapporo Atsubetsu Park Stadium	Consadole Sapporo	2-0
35	2003.9.23	Kose Sports Stadium	Yokohama F.C.	3-0
36	2003.9.27	Hakata no mori stadium	Avispa Fukuoka	0-3
37	2003.10.4	Kose Sports Stadium	Omiya Ardija	3-0
38	2003.10.11	Kose Sports Stadium	Sanfrecce Hiroshima	0-0
39	2003.10.18	Yamagata Park Stadium	Montedio Yamagata	1-2
40	2003.10.26	Niigata Stadium	Albirex Niigata	0-2
41	2003.11.1	Kose Sports Stadium	Kawasaki Frontale	2-0
42	2003.11.8	Hiratsuka Athletics Stadium	Shonan Bellmare	2-2
43	2003.11.15	Kose Sports Stadium	Mito HollyHock	1-0
44	2003.11.23	Tosu Stadium	Sagan Tosu	1-1

=== Emperor's Cup ===
Match	Date	Venue	Opponents	Score
1st Round	2003..	[[]]	[[]]	-
2nd Round	2003..	[[]]	[[]]	-
3rd Round	2003..	[[]]	[[]]	-

== Player statistics ==
No.	Pos.	Player	D.o.B. (Age)	Height / Weight	J. League 2		Emperor's Cup		Total	
No.	Pos.	Player	D.o.B. (Age)	Height / Weight	Apps	Goals	Apps	Goals	Apps	Goals
1	GK	Kensaku Abe	May 13, 1980 (aged 22)	cm / kg	30	0				
2	DF	Masaharu Nishi	May 29, 1977 (aged 25)	cm / kg	1	0				
3	DF	Takuma Tsuda	October 4, 1980 (aged 22)	cm / kg	7	0				
4	DF	Hideomi Yamamoto	June 26, 1980 (aged 22)	cm / kg	34	3				
5	DF	Yukihiro Aoba	July 26, 1979 (aged 23)	cm / kg	38	0				
6	DF	Kenji Nakada	October 4, 1973 (aged 29)	cm / kg	20	0				
7	MF	Hiroyuki Dobashi	November 27, 1977 (aged 25)	cm / kg	11	0				
8	MF	Kazuki Kuranuki	November 10, 1978 (aged 24)	cm / kg	44	0				
9	FW	Jorginho	September 5, 1979 (aged 23)	cm / kg	8	2				
10	MF	Ken Fujita	August 27, 1979 (aged 23)	cm / kg	39	9				
11	FW	Yoshitaka Kageyama	March 31, 1978 (aged 24)	cm / kg	6	0				
13	MF	Tetsuya Oishi	November 26, 1979 (aged 23)	cm / kg	3	0				
14	MF	Katsuya Ishihara	October 2, 1978 (aged 24)	cm / kg	42	4				
15	DF	Alair	January 27, 1982 (aged 21)	cm / kg	35	2				
16	MF	Juninho	July 7, 1982 (aged 20)	cm / kg	4	0				
16	FW	Takafumi Ogura	July 6, 1973 (aged 29)	cm / kg	27	10				
17	MF	Daisuke Tonoike	January 29, 1975 (aged 28)	cm / kg	43	7				
18	FW	Daisuke Sudo	April 25, 1977 (aged 25)	cm / kg	36	7				
19	DF	Yosuke Ikehata	June 7, 1979 (aged 23)	cm / kg	37	2				
20	MF	Jun Mizukoshi	January 15, 1975 (aged 28)	cm / kg	44	5				
21	GK	Torashi Shimazu	August 20, 1978 (aged 24)	cm / kg	0	0				
22	GK	Tatsuya Tsuruta	September 9, 1982 (aged 20)	cm / kg	14	0				
23	FW	Kotaro Yamazaki	October 19, 1978 (aged 24)	cm / kg	13	2				
24	MF	Takashi Ono	July 4, 1979 (aged 23)	cm / kg	0	0				
24	FW	Michiharu Sugimoto	June 17, 1981 (aged 21)	cm / kg	3	0				
25	DF	Yuzo Wada	May 2, 1980 (aged 22)	cm / kg	0	0				
26	FW	Taro Hasegawa	August 17, 1979 (aged 23)	cm / kg	4	0				
27	FW	Hidehito Shirao	September 30, 1980 (aged 22)	cm / kg	12	1				
28	MF	Shinya Nasu	December 29, 1978 (aged 24)	cm / kg	37	1				
29	DF	Arata Sugiyama	July 25, 1980 (aged 22)	cm / kg	16	0				
30	MF	Kyosuke Ota	October 9, 1984 (aged 18)	cm / kg	0	0				
31	MF	Makoto Watanabe	September 25, 1980 (aged 22)	cm / kg	1	0				
32	MF	Takeshi Honda	May 20, 1981 (aged 21)	cm / kg	2	0				

== Other pages ==
- (in Japanese) J. League official site
