= Kota Ogi =

Japanese footballer

Kota Ogi 荻 晃太
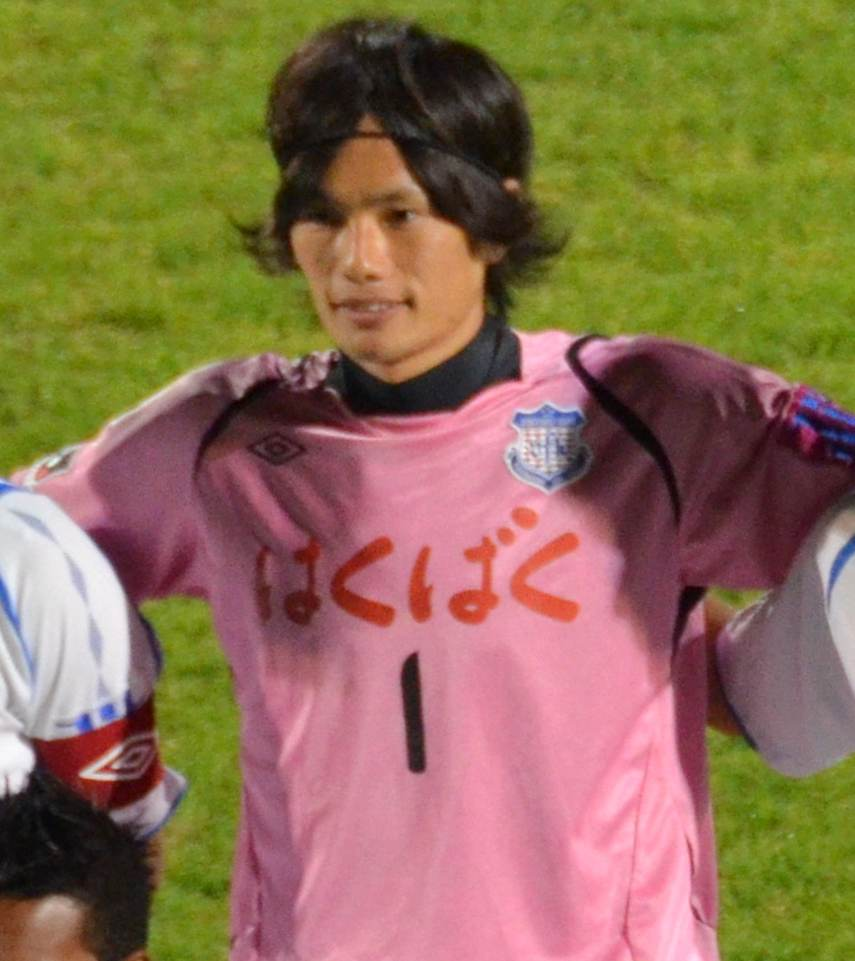

Personal information
- Full name: Kota Ogi
- Date of birth: May 5, 1983 (age 43)
- Place of birth: Mino, Gifu, Japan
- Height: 1.83 m (6 ft 0 in)
- Position: Goalkeeper

Youth career
- 1999–2001: Gifu Technical; High School

Senior career*
Years	Team	Apps	(Gls)
2002–2007	Vissel Kobe	46	(0)
2007	Omiya Ardija	0	(0)
2008	FC Tokyo	0	(0)
2009–2015	Ventforet Kofu	188	(0)
2016–2017	Nagoya Grampus	0	(0)
2018–2019	Vissel Kobe	0	(0)
Total		234	(0)
- * Club domestic league appearances and goals as of 14 April 2020

Kota Ogi (荻 晃太, Ogi Kota; born May 5, 1983) is a former Japanese football player who last played for Vissel Kobe.

== Playing career ==
Ogi was born in Mino on May 5, 1983. After graduating from high school, he joined J1 League club Vissel Kobe in 2002. However he could hardly play in the match behind Makoto Kakegawa and Vissel was relegated to J2 League end of 2005 season. Kakegawa left the club end of 2005 season and Ogi became a regular goalkeeper in 2006. Vissel won the 3rd place in 2006 season and was promoted to J1 in a year. However Ogi lost his position behind new goalkeeper Tatsuya Enomoto in 2007.

Ogi moved to Omiya Ardija in September 2007 and FC Tokyo in 2008. However he could hardly play in the match in both clubs. In 2009, he moved to J2 club Ventforet Kofu and became a regular goalkeeper soon. From 2010, he played many matches for a long time while battling with Hiroki Aratani, Kohei Kawata and Hiroki Oka for the position. In 2016, Ogi moved to Nagoya Grampus. However he could hardly play in the match behind Seigo Narazaki. In 2018, he moved to his first club Vissel Kobe for the first time in 11 years.

His career ended in December 2019, entering Vissel Kobe's technical staff only one month later as a goalkeeper coach.

== Club statistics ==
As of 14 April 2020.

Club performance			League		Cup		League Cup		Total	
Season	Club	League	Apps	Goals	Apps	Goals	Apps	Goals	Apps	Goals
Japan			League		Emperor's Cup		J.League Cup		Total	
2002	Vissel Kobe	J1 League	0	0	1	0	0	0	1	0
2003	Vissel Kobe	J1 League	0	0	0	0	0	0	0	0
2004	Vissel Kobe	J1 League	0	0	0	0	0	0	0	0
2005	Vissel Kobe	J1 League	1	0	0	0	0	0	1	0
2006	Vissel Kobe	J2 League	45	0	0	0	-		45	0
2007	Vissel Kobe	J1 League	0	0	0	0	1	0	1	0
2007	Omiya Ardija	J1 League	0	0	1	0	0	0	1	0
2008	FC Tokyo	J1 League	0	0	0	0	1	0	1	0
2009	Ventforet Kofu	J2 League	44	0	0	0	-		44	0
2010	Ventforet Kofu	J2 League	28	0	0	0	-		28	0
2011	Ventforet Kofu	J1 League	23	0	1	0	1	0	25	0
2012	Ventforet Kofu	J2 League	42	0	0	0	-		42	0
2013	Ventforet Kofu	J1 League	17	0	2	0	2	0	21	0
2014	Ventforet Kofu	J1 League	23	0	2	0	4	0	29	0
2015	Ventforet Kofu	J1 League	11	0	1	0	4	0	16	0
2016	Nagoya Grampus	J1 League	0	0	0	0	1	0	1	0
2017	Nagoya Grampus	J2 League	0	0	0	0	-		0	0
2018	Vissel Kobe	J1 League	0	0	0	0	0	0	0	0
2019	Vissel Kobe	J1 League	0	0	0	0	0	0	0	0
Career total			234	0	8	0	14	0	256	0
