= Tatsuya Tsuruta =

Japanese footballer

Tatsuya Tsuruta 鶴田 達也
Personal information
- Full name: Tatsuya Tsuruta
- Date of birth: September 9, 1982 (age 44)
- Place of birth: Fuji, Shizuoka, Japan
- Height: 1.90 m (6 ft 3 in)
- Position: Goalkeeper

Youth career
- 1998–2000: Shimizu S-Pulse

Senior career*
Years	Team	Apps	(Gls)
2001–2004	Shimizu S-Pulse	0	(0)
2002–2003	→Ventforet Kofu (loan)	50	(0)
2005–2009	Ventforet Kofu	37	(0)
2010	Ehime FC	0	(0)
2011–2012	Kataller Toyama	21	(0)
Total		108	(0)
Medal record
Shimizu S-Pulse
Winner	Emperor's Cup	2001
- * Club domestic league appearances and goals

Tatsuya Tsuruta (鶴田 達也, Tsuruta Tatsuya; born September 9, 1982) is a former Japanese football player.

== Playing career ==
Tsuruta was born in Fuji on September 9, 1982. He joined J1 League club Shimizu S-Pulse from youth team in 2001. However he could not play at all in the match behind Masanori Sanada. In 2002, he moved to J2 League club Ventforet Kofu on loan. He played many matches as regular goalkeeper in 2002. However his opportunity to play decreased behind newcomer Kensaku Abe in 2003. In 2004, he returned to Shimizu S-Pulse. However he could not play at all in the match behind Yohei Nishibe. In 2005, he moved to J2 club Ventforet Kofu again. Although he played as regular goalkeeper initially, he could hardly play in the match from summer in 2005. Although the club was promoted to J1 from 2006, he could not play many matches in 2006. Although he became a regular goalkeeper again in June 2007, the club was relegated to J2 end of 2007 season. From 2008, he could hardly play in the match behind Shigeru Sakurai and Kota Ogi. In 2010, he moved to J2 club Ehime FC. However he could not play at all in the match behind Hiromasa Yamamoto and Yusuke Kawakita. In 2011, he moved to J2 club Kataller Toyama. However he injured his right knee before opening 2011 season. He came back in October and became a regular goalkeeper. He played many matches as regular goalkeeper until June 2012. However the club gained new goalkeeper Tatsuya Morita in June and Tsuruta could hardly play in the match behind Morita from June. He retired end of 2012 season.

== Club statistics ==
Club performance			League		Cup		League Cup		Total	
Season	Club	League	Apps	Goals	Apps	Goals	Apps	Goals	Apps	Goals
Japan			League		Emperor's Cup		J.League Cup		Total	
2001	Shimizu S-Pulse	J1 League	0	0	0	0	0	0	0	0
2002	Ventforet Kofu	J2 League	36	0	3	0	-		39	0
2003	Ventforet Kofu	J2 League	14	0	3	0	-		17	0
2004	Shimizu S-Pulse	J1 League	0	0	0	0	0	0	0	0
2005	Ventforet Kofu	J2 League	16	0	0	0	-		16	0
2006	Ventforet Kofu	J1 League	4	0	0	0	0	0	4	0
2007	Ventforet Kofu	J1 League	16	0	1	0	3	0	20	0
2008	Ventforet Kofu	J2 League	1	0	0	0	-		1	0
2009	Ventforet Kofu	J2 League	0	0	0	0	-		0	0
2010	Ehime FC	J2 League	0	0	0	0	-		0	0
2011	Kataller Toyama	J2 League	7	0	1	0	-		8	0
2012	Kataller Toyama	J2 League	14	0	0	0	-		014	0
Total			108	0	8	0	3	0	119	0
