= 2016 Ventforet Kofu season =

Ventforet Kofu
2016 season
- Manager: Satoru Sakuma
- Stadium: Yamanashi Chuo Bank Stadium
- J1 League: 14th

2016 Ventforet Kofu season.

== J1 League ==
=== League table ===
Pos	Team	Pld	W	D	L	GF	GA	GD	Pts
13	Júbilo Iwata	34	8	12	14	37	50	−13	36
14	Ventforet Kofu	34	7	10	17	32	58	−26	31
15	Albirex Niigata	34	8	6	20	33	49	−16	30

Source: Meiji Yasuda J1 League
Rules for classification: 1) Points; 2) Goal difference; 3) Goals scored.

=== Match details ===
J1 League match details
Match	Date	Team	Score	Team	Venue	Attendance
1-1	2016.02.27	Vissel Kobe	0-2	Ventforet Kofu	Noevir Stadium Kobe	23,862
1-2	2016.03.06	Ventforet Kofu	0-1	Gamba Osaka	Yamanashi Chuo Bank Stadium	14,103
1-3	2016.03.12	Sagan Tosu	1-1	Ventforet Kofu	Best Amenity Stadium	8,697
1-4	2016.03.19	Ventforet Kofu	0-4	Kawasaki Frontale	Yamanashi Chuo Bank Stadium	9,567
1-5	2016.04.01	Urawa Reds	2-1	Ventforet Kofu	Saitama Stadium 2002	22,766
1-6	2016.04.10	Ventforet Kofu	3-1	Shonan Bellmare	Yamanashi Chuo Bank Stadium	10,027
1-7	2016.04.16	Omiya Ardija	1-1	Ventforet Kofu	NACK5 Stadium Omiya	9,659
1-8	2016.04.24	Ventforet Kofu	1-1	FC Tokyo	Yamanashi Chuo Bank Stadium	12,123
1-9	2016.04.30	Albirex Niigata	2-2	Ventforet Kofu	Denka Big Swan Stadium	17,607
1-10	2016.05.04	Ventforet Kofu	0-2	Kashiwa Reysol	Yamanashi Chuo Bank Stadium	11,338
1-11	2016.05.08	Yokohama F. Marinos	2-2	Ventforet Kofu	Nissan Stadium	18,021
1-12	2016.05.14	Ventforet Kofu	2-2	Nagoya Grampus	Yamanashi Chuo Bank Stadium	10,184
1-13	2016.05.21	Júbilo Iwata	3-1	Ventforet Kofu	Yamaha Stadium	13,616
1-14	2016.05.29	Kashima Antlers	4-0	Ventforet Kofu	Kashima Soccer Stadium	14,289
1-15	2016.06.11	Ventforet Kofu	1-0	Avispa Fukuoka	Yamanashi Chuo Bank Stadium	8,133
1-16	2016.06.18	Vegalta Sendai	2-1	Ventforet Kofu	Yurtec Stadium Sendai	15,166
1-17	2016.06.25	Ventforet Kofu	0-3	Sanfrecce Hiroshima	Yamanashi Chuo Bank Stadium	11,816
2-1	2016.07.02	Ventforet Kofu	0-3	Vissel Kobe	Yamanashi Chuo Bank Stadium	7,011
2-2	2016.07.09	FC Tokyo	1-0	Ventforet Kofu	Ajinomoto Stadium	17,978
2-3	2016.07.13	Ventforet Kofu	0-0	Júbilo Iwata	Yamanashi Chuo Bank Stadium	7,064
2-4	2016.07.17	Ventforet Kofu	3-3	Kashima Antlers	Yamanashi Chuo Bank Stadium	14,095
2-5	2016.07.23	Nagoya Grampus	1-3	Ventforet Kofu	Paloma Mizuho Stadium	12,072
2-6	2016.07.30	Ventforet Kofu	0-2	Urawa Reds	Yamanashi Chuo Bank Stadium	15,508
2-7	2016.08.06	Kawasaki Frontale	4-0	Ventforet Kofu	Kawasaki Todoroki Stadium	20,016
2-8	2016.08.13	Ventforet Kofu	1-0	Albirex Niigata	Yamanashi Chuo Bank Stadium	10,135
2-9	2016.08.20	Sanfrecce Hiroshima	0-1	Ventforet Kofu	Edion Stadium Hiroshima	11,853
2-10	2016.08.27	Ventforet Kofu	2-2	Omiya Ardija	Yamanashi Chuo Bank Stadium	7,960
2-11	2016.09.10	Gamba Osaka	2-1	Ventforet Kofu	Suita City Football Stadium	17,921
2-12	2016.09.17	Ventforet Kofu	1-1	Vegalta Sendai	Yamanashi Chuo Bank Stadium	8,771
2-13	2016.09.25	Kashiwa Reysol	1-0	Ventforet Kofu	Hitachi Kashiwa Stadium	9,043
2-14	2016.10.01	Ventforet Kofu	0-4	Yokohama F. Marinos	Yamanashi Chuo Bank Stadium	11,650
2-15	2016.10.22	Avispa Fukuoka	1-2	Ventforet Kofu	Level5 Stadium	10,536
2-16	2016.10.29	Shonan Bellmare	1-0	Ventforet Kofu	Shonan BMW Stadium Hiratsuka	11,883
2-17	2016.11.03	Ventforet Kofu	0-1	Sagan Tosu	Yamanashi Chuo Bank Stadium	14,676
