= Atsushi Katagiri =

Japanese footballer

Atsushi Katagiri 片桐 淳至
Personal information
- Full name: Atsushi Katagiri
- Date of birth: August 1, 1983 (age 43)
- Place of birth: Gifu, Japan
- Height: 1.77 m (5 ft 9 1/2 in)
- Position: Forward

Youth career
- 1999–2001: Gifu Technical High School

Senior career*
Years	Team	Apps	(Gls)
2002–2005	Nagoya Grampus Eight	5	(0)
2004	→Rosario Central (loan)		
2004	→Quilmes (loan)		
2005	FC Horikoshi	10	(4)
2006–2009	FC Gifu	104	(32)
2009–2012	Ventforet Kofu	73	(5)
2013	MIO Biwako Shiga	10	(2)
Total		202	(43)
- * Club domestic league appearances and goals

Atsushi Katagiri (片桐 淳至, Katagiri Atsushi; born August 1, 1983) is a former Japanese football player.

== Playing career ==
Katagiri was born in Gifu on August 1, 1983. After graduating from high school, he joined J1 League club Nagoya Grampus Eight in 2002. Although he debuted in first season, he could hardly play in the match. In 2004, he was loaned to Argentine club Rosario Central and Quilmes. Although he returned to Grampus in 2005, he could not play at all in the match. In July 2005, he moved to Japan Football League (JFL) club FC Horikoshi and played many matches. In 2006, he moved to his local club FC Gifu in Regional Leagues. He became a regular player and scored many goals. FC Gifu was promoted to JFL in 2007 and J2 League in 2008. In June 2009, he moved to J2 club Ventforet Kofu. He played many matches as substitute forward in 2009 and became a regular forward in 2010. Although he could hardly play in the match in late 2010, Ventforet was promoted to J1 end of 2010 season. Although he played many matches in 2011, Ventforet was relegated to J2 in a year. He could not play many matches in 2012 and left the club end of 2012 season. After half year blank, he joined JFL club MIO Biwako Shiga in August 2013. He retired end of 2013 season.

== Club statistics ==
Club performance			League		Cup		League Cup		Total	
Season	Club	League	Apps	Goals	Apps	Goals	Apps	Goals	Apps	Goals
Japan			League		Emperor's Cup		J.League Cup		Total	
2002	Nagoya Grampus Eight	J1 League	5	0	0	0	5	1	10	1
2003	Nagoya Grampus Eight	J1 League	0	0	0	0	0	0	0	0
2005	Nagoya Grampus Eight	J1 League	0	0	0	0	0	0	0	0
2005	FC Horikoshi	Football League	10	4	3	2	-		13	6
2006	FC Gifu	Regional Leagues	14	14	3	1	-		17	5
2007	FC Gifu	Football League	32	7	2	0	-		34	7
2008	FC Gifu	J2 League	39	9	2	0	-		41	9
2009	FC Gifu	J2 League	19	2	0	0	-		19	2
2009	Ventforet Kofu	J2 League	17	0	3	1	-		20	1
2010	Ventforet Kofu	J2 League	15	3	0	0	-		15	3
2011	Ventforet Kofu	J1 League	29	1	1	0	2	0	32	1
2012	Ventforet Kofu	J2 League	12	1	0	0	-		12	1
Total			202	43	14	4	7	1	223	48
