= Hideomi =

- Gender: Male

Origin
- Origin: Japanese
- Meaning: Different meanings depending on the kanji used

Hideomi (written: 英臣) is a masculine Japanese given name. Notable people with the name include:

- Hideomi Fukatsu (深津 英臣; born 1990), Japanese volleyball player
- Hideomi Yamamoto (山本 英臣; born 1980), Japanese footballer
