= 2015 Ventforet Kofu season =

Ventforet Kofu
2015 season
- Manager: Yasuhiro Higuchi; Satoru Sakuma
- Stadium: Yamanashi Chuo Bank Stadium
- J1 League: 13th

2015 Ventforet Kofu season.

== J1 League ==
=== League table ===
Pos	Team	Pld	W	D	L	GF	GA	GD	Pts
12	Vissel Kobe	34	10	8	16	44	49	−5	38
13	Ventforet Kofu	34	10	7	17	26	43	−17	37
14	Vegalta Sendai	34	9	8	17	44	48	−4	35

Updated to match(es) played on 28 November 2015. Source: Meiji Yasuda J1 League Standings
Rules for classification: 1) Points; 2) Goal difference; 3) Goals scored

=== Match details ===
J1 League match details
Match	Date	Team	Score	Team	Venue	Attendance
1-1	2015.03.07	Sanfrecce Hiroshima	2-0	Ventforet Kofu	Edion Stadium Hiroshima	14,671
1-2	2015.03.14	Ventforet Kofu	1-0	Nagoya Grampus	Yamanashi Chuo Bank Stadium	11,851
1-3	2015.03.22	Ventforet Kofu	0-2	Gamba Osaka	Yamanashi Chuo Bank Stadium	13,047
1-4	2015.04.04	FC Tokyo	1-0	Ventforet Kofu	Ajinomoto Stadium	20,743
1-5	2015.04.12	Vissel Kobe	4-1	Ventforet Kofu	Noevir Stadium Kobe	15,494
1-6	2015.04.18	Ventforet Kofu	0-3	Sagan Tosu	Yamanashi Chuo Bank Stadium	8,033
1-7	2015.04.25	Kawasaki Frontale	3-0	Ventforet Kofu	Kawasaki Todoroki Stadium	16,953
1-8	2015.04.29	Ventforet Kofu	0-2	Urawa Reds	Yamanashi Chuo Bank Stadium	13,708
1-9	2015.05.02	Kashima Antlers	0-1	Ventforet Kofu	Kashima Soccer Stadium	15,340
1-10	2015.05.06	Matsumoto Yamaga FC	2-0	Ventforet Kofu	Matsumotodaira Park Stadium	16,916
1-11	2015.05.10	Ventforet Kofu	0-1	Shonan Bellmare	Yamanashi Chuo Bank Stadium	10,350
1-12	2015.05.16	Ventforet Kofu	2-0	Montedio Yamagata	Yamanashi Chuo Bank Stadium	9,159
1-13	2015.05.23	Vegalta Sendai	0-1	Ventforet Kofu	Yurtec Stadium Sendai	13,165
1-14	2015.05.30	Albirex Niigata	0-2	Ventforet Kofu	Denka Big Swan Stadium	23,197
1-15	2015.06.07	Ventforet Kofu	1-1	Yokohama F. Marinos	Yamanashi Chuo Bank Stadium	13,007
1-16	2015.06.20	Shimizu S-Pulse	0-2	Ventforet Kofu	IAI Stadium Nihondaira	13,288
1-17	2015.06.27	Ventforet Kofu	1-1	Kashiwa Reysol	Yamanashi Chuo Bank Stadium	11,019
2-1	2015.07.11	Gamba Osaka	2-1	Ventforet Kofu	Expo '70 Commemorative Stadium	14,364
2-2	2015.07.15	Ventforet Kofu	0-0	Vegalta Sendai	Yamanashi Chuo Bank Stadium	7,015
2-3	2015.07.19	Shonan Bellmare	0-2	Ventforet Kofu	Shonan BMW Stadium Hiratsuka	12,144
2-4	2015.07.25	Ventforet Kofu	0-1	Matsumoto Yamaga FC	Yamanashi Chuo Bank Stadium	14,176
2-5	2015.07.29	Urawa Reds	1-1	Ventforet Kofu	Saitama Stadium 2002	22,363
2-6	2015.08.12	Ventforet Kofu	0-1	FC Tokyo	Yamanashi Chuo Bank Stadium	12,164
2-7	2015.08.16	Yokohama F. Marinos	2-0	Ventforet Kofu	Nissan Stadium	19,207
2-8	2015.08.22	Ventforet Kofu	1-0	Vissel Kobe	Yamanashi Chuo Bank Stadium	9,113
2-9	2015.08.30	Kashiwa Reysol	2-2	Ventforet Kofu	Hitachi Kashiwa Stadium	8,002
2-10	2015.09.12	Ventforet Kofu	1-3	Kawasaki Frontale	Yamanashi Chuo Bank Stadium	11,069
2-11	2015.09.19	Ventforet Kofu	0-1	Kashima Antlers	Yamanashi Chuo Bank Stadium	12,131
2-12	2015.09.26	Sagan Tosu	0-1	Ventforet Kofu	Best Amenity Stadium	9,672
2-13	2015.10.03	Ventforet Kofu	0-0	Albirex Niigata	Yamanashi Chuo Bank Stadium	11,102
2-14	2015.10.17	Montedio Yamagata	0-1	Ventforet Kofu	ND Soft Stadium Yamagata	8,191
2-15	2015.10.24	Ventforet Kofu	0-2	Sanfrecce Hiroshima	Yamanashi Chuo Bank Stadium	11,062
2-16	2015.11.07	Nagoya Grampus	4-2	Ventforet Kofu	Toyota Stadium	16,970
2-17	2015.11.22	Ventforet Kofu	2-2	Shimizu S-Pulse	Yamanashi Chuo Bank Stadium	14,036
