= Ken Fujita =

Japanese footballer

Ken Fujita 藤田 健
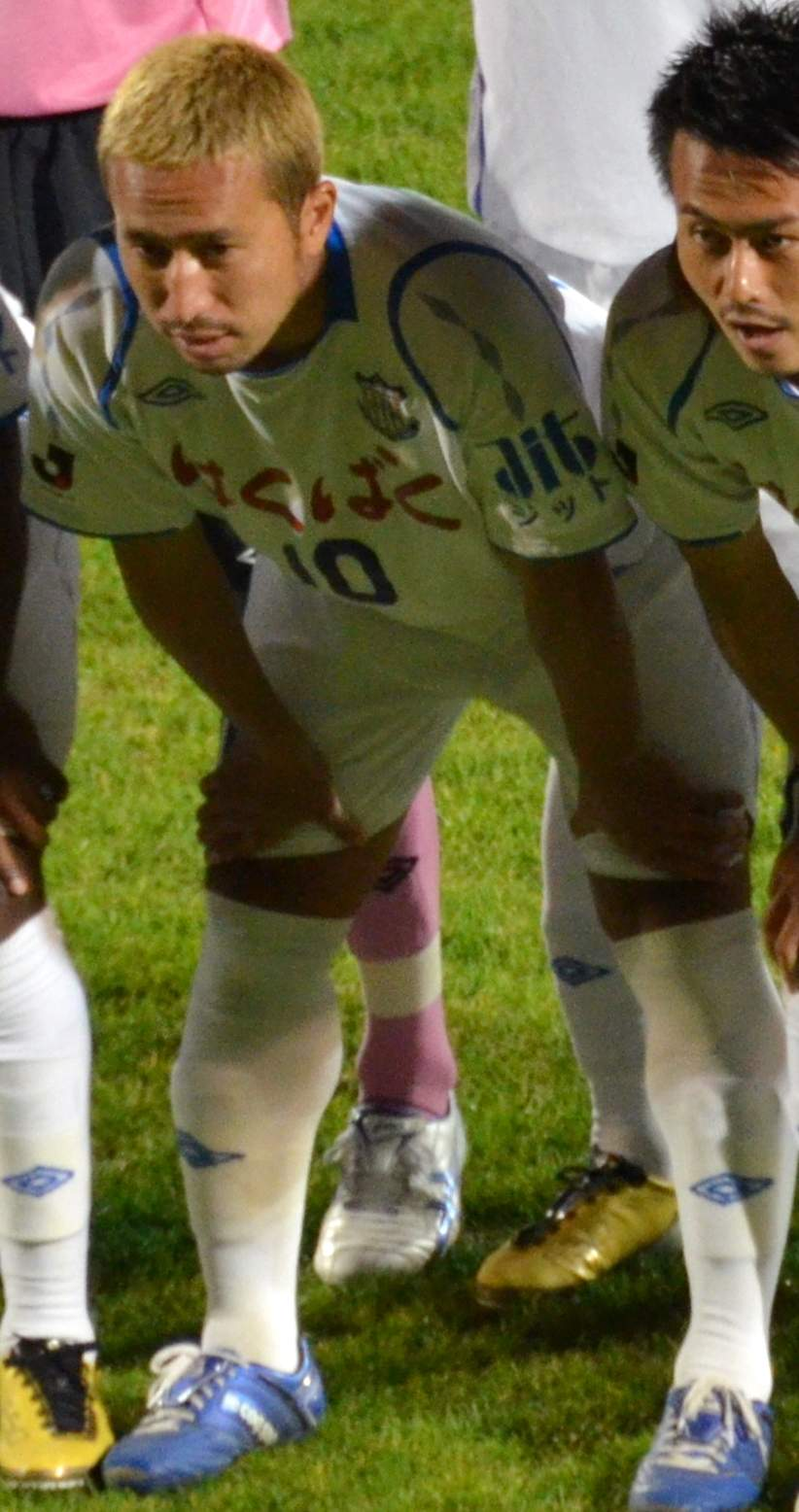

Personal information
- Full name: Ken Fujita
- Date of birth: August 27, 1979 (age 47)
- Place of birth: Hamamatsu, Shizuoka, Japan
- Height: 1.67 m (5 ft 5 1/2 in)
- Position: Midfielder

Youth career
- 1995–1997: Júbilo Iwata

Senior career*
Years	Team	Apps	(Gls)
1998	Júbilo Iwata	0	(0)
2001–2010	Ventforet Kofu	354	(41)
2012	Tallinna Kalev		
Total		354	(41)
Medal record
Júbilo Iwata
Runner-up	J1 League	1998
Winner	J.League Cup	1998
- * Club domestic league appearances and goals

Ken Fujita (藤田 健, Fujita Ken; born August 27, 1979) (former name; Ken Ota, 太田 健) is a former Japanese football player.

== Playing career ==
Fujita was born in Hamamatsu on August 27, 1979. He joined J1 League club Júbilo Iwata from a youth team in 1998. However he did not play in any matches and left the club end of 1998 season. After two years, he joined the J2 League club Ventforet Kofu in 2001. He became a regular player during the first season and played many matches as offensive midfielder for a long time. He wore the number 10 shirt for the club from 2002 to 2010. The club finished in last place in 2001, at middle place from 2002 to 2004, the club won the third place in 2005 and was promoted to J1 in 2006. Although the club was relegated to J2 in 2008, the club was promoted to J1 from 2011. However he was released from the club at the end of the 2010 season. After a year, he joined the Estonian club Tallinna Kalev in 2012. He retired at the end of the 2012 season.

== Career statistics ==
Appearances and goals by club, season and competition
Club	Season	League			Emperor's Cup		J.League Cup		Total	
Club	Season	Division	Apps	Goals	Apps	Goals	Apps	Goals	Apps	Goals
Júbilo Iwata	1998	J1 League	0	0	0	0	0	0	0	0
Ventforet Kofu	2001	J2 League	35	4	3	0	2	0	40	4
Ventforet Kofu	2002	J2 League	33	5	2	0	—		35	5
Ventforet Kofu	2003	J2 League	39	9	1	0	—		40	9
Ventforet Kofu	2004	J2 League	28	2	1	0	—		29	2
Ventforet Kofu	2005	J2 League	41	10	2	0	—		43	10
Ventforet Kofu	2006	J1 League	26	2	3	1	1	0	30	3
Ventforet Kofu	2007	J1 League	32	2	1	0	7	0	40	2
Ventforet Kofu	2008	J2 League	38	3	1	0	—		39	3
Ventforet Kofu	2009	J2 League	50	2	2	0	—		52	2
Ventforet Kofu	2010	J2 League	32	2	1	0	—		33	2
Career total			354	41	15	1	10	0	379	42
