= Ryo Goto =

Japanese footballer

Personal information
- Full name: Ryo Goto
- Date of birth: 25 August 1986 (age 40)
- Place of birth: Saitama, Japan
- Height: 1.71 m (5 ft 7 1/2 in)
- Position: Forward

Senior career*
Years	Team	Apps	(Gls)
2005–2013	Thespakusatsu Gunma	204	(30)
Total		204	(30)
- * Club domestic league appearances and goals

Ryo Goto (後藤 涼, Gotō Ryō; born 25 August 1986) is a former Japanese football player.

== Career ==
On 22 October 2013, Goto was arrested by the Gunma prefectural police for shoplifting two vintage boots worth ¥150,000 from clothes store in Takasaki. Although he was released from regional prosecutors office on 1 November 2013, Thespakusatsu Gunma made an announcement on 12 November 2013 that they would terminate the contract with him retroactively as of 22 October, on the date he was arrested.

== Club statistics ==
Club	Season	J2 League		Emperor's Cup		Total	
Club	Season	Apps	Goals	Apps	Goals	Apps	Goals
Thespa Kusatsu	2005	16	0	2	0	18	0
Thespa Kusatsu	2006	19	1	0	0	19	1
Thespa Kusatsu	2007	12	0	0	0	12	0
Thespa Kusatsu	2008	41	12	2	1	43	13
Thespa Kusatsu	2009	45	9	1	1	46	10
Thespa Kusatsu	2010	20	3	0	0	20	3
Thespa Kusatsu	2011	26	5	1	0	27	5
Thespa Kusatsu	2012	21	0	1	0	22	0
Thespakusatsu Gunma	2013	4	0	0	0	4	0
Total		204	30	7	2	211	32
