= Junya Kuno =

Japanese footballer

Personal information
- Date of birth: August 16, 1988 (age 38)
- Place of birth: Fukuroi, Shizuoka, Japan
- Height: 1.70 m (5 ft 7 in)
- Position: Forward

Youth career
- 2004–2006: Tokohagakuen Tachibana; Junior High School

Senior career*
Years	Team	Apps	(Gls)
2007–2009	Ventforet Kofu	23	(4)
2010–2017	Fukushima United FC	94	(27)
2015–2017	→ Honda FC (loan)	45	(9)
- * Club domestic league appearances and goals as of 2 February 2018

Junya Kuno (久野 純弥, Kuno Junya; born August 16, 1988) is a former Japanese football player. He last played for Honda FC.

== Club statistics ==
Updated to 2 February 2018.

Club performance			League		Cup		League Cup		Total	
Season	Club	League	Apps	Goals	Apps	Goals	Apps	Goals	Apps	Goals
Japan			League		Emperor's Cup		J.League Cup		Total	
2007	Ventforet Kofu	J1 League	6	1	1	1	1	0	8	2
2008	Ventforet Kofu	J2 League	17	3	0	0	-		17	3
2009	Ventforet Kofu	J2 League	0	0	0	0	-		0	0
2010	Fukushima United FC	JRL (Tohoku)	14	11	1	0	-		15	11
2011	Fukushima United FC	JRL (Tohoku)	12	8	2	1	-		14	9
2012	Fukushima United FC	JRL (Tohoku)	10	3	3	2	-		13	5
2013	Fukushima United FC	JFL	29	1	1	0	-		30	1
2014	Fukushima United FC	J3 League	29	4	1	1	-		30	5
2015	Honda FC	JFL	13	4	-		-		13	4
2016	Honda FC	JFL	18	2	4	1	-		22	3
2017	Honda FC	JFL	14	3	1	0	-		15	3
Total			162	40	14	6	1	0	177	46
