= 2013 Ventforet Kofu season =

Ventforet Kofu
2013 season
- Manager: Hiroshi Jofuku
- Stadium: Yamanashi Chuo Bank Stadium
- J.League Division 1: 15th
- Emperor's Cup: Quarter-final
- J.League Cup: Group stage

During the 2013 season, Ventforet Kofu competed in the J.League Division 1, in which they finished 15th.

== J1 League ==
=== League table ===
| Pos | Team | Pld | W | D | L | GF | GA | GD | Pts | Qualification or relegation |
|---|---|---|---|---|---|---|---|---|---|---|
| 13 | Vegalta Sendai | 34 | 11 | 12 | 11 | 41 | 38 | +3 | 45 | |
| 14 | Omiya Ardija | 34 | 14 | 3 | 17 | 45 | 48 | −3 | 45 | |
| 15 | Ventforet Kofu | 34 | 8 | 13 | 13 | 30 | 41 | −11 | 37 | |
| 16 | Shonan Bellmare (R) | 34 | 6 | 7 | 21 | 34 | 62 | −28 | 25 | Relegation to 2014 J.League Division 2 |
| 17 | Júbilo Iwata (R) | 34 | 4 | 11 | 19 | 40 | 56 | −16 | 23 | Relegation to 2014 J.League Division 2 |

Updated to match(es) played on 7 December 2013. Source: J.League Division 1
Rules for classification: 1) points; 2) goal difference; 3) number of goals scored.
(R) Relegated

=== Results ===
| Match | Date | Team | Score | Team | Venue | Attendance |
|---|---|---|---|---|---|---|
| 1 | 2013.03.02 | Vegalta Sendai | 1–1 | Ventforet Kofu | Yurtec Stadium Sendai | 16,353 |
| 2 | 2013.03.09 | Ventforet Kofu | 1–2 | Cerezo Osaka | Yamanashi Chuo Bank Stadium | 12,116 |
| 3 | 2013.03.16 | Ventforet Kofu | 0–1 | Nagoya Grampus | Yamanashi Chuo Bank Stadium | 11,230 |
| 4 | 2013.03.30 | Kawasaki Frontale | 1–1 | Ventforet Kofu | Kawasaki Todoroki Stadium | 14,108 |
| 5 | 2013.04.06 | Oita Trinita | 0–1 | Ventforet Kofu | Oita Bank Dome | 7,913 |
| 6 | 2013.04.13 | Ventforet Kofu | 3–1 | Kashiwa Reysol | Yamanashi Chuo Bank Stadium | 10,569 |
| 7 | 2013.04.20 | Kashima Antlers | 0–0 | Ventforet Kofu | Kashima Soccer Stadium | 9,898 |
| 8 | 2013.04.27 | Yokohama F. Marinos | 1–1 | Ventforet Kofu | Nissan Stadium | 24,149 |
| 9 | 2013.05.03 | Ventforet Kofu | 2–1 | Júbilo Iwata | Yamanashi Chuo Bank Stadium | 14,062 |
| 10 | 2013.05.06 | Albirex Niigata | 1–1 | Ventforet Kofu | Tohoku Denryoku Big Swan Stadium | 27,720 |
| 11 | 2013.05.11 | Ventforet Kofu | 0–2 | Shimizu S-Pulse | Yamanashi Chuo Bank Stadium | 7,754 |
| 12 | 2013.05.18 | Sanfrecce Hiroshima | 5–1 | Ventforet Kofu | Edion Stadium Hiroshima | 10,550 |
| 13 | 2013.05.25 | Ventforet Kofu | 0–3 | Omiya Ardija | Yamanashi Chuo Bank Stadium | 11,063 |
| 14 | 2013.07.06 | Ventforet Kofu | 0–1 | Urawa Reds | Tokyo National Stadium | 28,906 |
| 15 | 2013.07.10 | Sagan Tosu | 2–1 | Ventforet Kofu | Best Amenity Stadium | 6,292 |
| 16 | 2013.07.13 | Ventforet Kofu | 0–1 | Shonan Bellmare | Yamanashi Chuo Bank Stadium | 10,175 |
| 17 | 2013.07.17 | FC Tokyo | 4–1 | Ventforet Kofu | Ajinomoto Stadium | 12,905 |
| 18 | 2013.07.31 | Ventforet Kofu | 0–1 | Vegalta Sendai | Yamanashi Chuo Bank Stadium | 8,773 |
| 19 | 2013.08.03 | Cerezo Osaka | 0–1 | Ventforet Kofu | Kincho Stadium | 13,633 |
| 20 | 2013.08.10 | Ventforet Kofu | 1–1 | Albirex Niigata | Yamanashi Chuo Bank Stadium | 12,749 |
| 21 | 2013.08.17 | Ventforet Kofu | 1–3 | Kawasaki Frontale | Yamanashi Chuo Bank Stadium | 12,657 |
| 22 | 2013.08.24 | Shonan Bellmare | 1–2 | Ventforet Kofu | Shonan BMW Stadium Hiratsuka | 10,165 |
| 23 | 2013.08.28 | Ventforet Kofu | 2–0 | Sanfrecce Hiroshima | Yamanashi Chuo Bank Stadium | 9,033 |
| 24 | 2013.08.31 | Júbilo Iwata | 1–1 | Ventforet Kofu | Yamaha Stadium | 9,307 |
| 25 | 2013.09.14 | Ventforet Kofu | 3–0 | Kashima Antlers | Yamanashi Chuo Bank Stadium | 15,137 |
| 26 | 2013.09.21 | Urawa Reds | 1–1 | Ventforet Kofu | Saitama Stadium 2002 | 31,077 |
| 27 | 2013.09.28 | Shimizu S-Pulse | 2–1 | Ventforet Kofu | IAI Stadium Nihondaira | 15,088 |
| 28 | 2013.10.05 | Ventforet Kofu | 0–0 | Yokohama F. Marinos | Yamanashi Chuo Bank Stadium | 12,547 |
| 29 | 2013.10.19 | Kashiwa Reysol | 2–0 | Ventforet Kofu | Hitachi Kashiwa Stadium | 9,011 |
| 30 | 2013.10.27 | Ventforet Kofu | 1–1 | FC Tokyo | Yamanashi Chuo Bank Stadium | 14,414 |
| 31 | 2013.11.10 | Omiya Ardija | 1–2 | Ventforet Kofu | NACK5 Stadium Omiya | 9,059 |
| 32 | 2013.11.23 | Ventforet Kofu | 0–0 | Oita Trinita | Yamanashi Chuo Bank Stadium | 11,514 |
| 33 | 2013.11.30 | Nagoya Grampus | 0–0 | Ventforet Kofu | Toyota Stadium | 26,369 |
| 34 | 2013.12.07 | Ventforet Kofu | 0–0 | Sagan Tosu | Yamanashi Chuo Bank Stadium | 11,742 |

== Emperor's Cup ==
| 7 September 2013 Second round | Ventforet Kofu | 1–0 | Fukushima United FC | Kōfu |
| 13:00 | Pottker 90+1' | Report | | Stadium: Yamanashi Chuo Bank Stadium; Attendance: 2,267; Referee: Minoru Tojo |

| 13 October 2013 Third round | Shonan Bellmare | 0–1 (a.e.t.) | Ventforet Kofu | Hiratsuka |
| 13:00 | | Report | Miyuki 104' | Stadium: Shonan BMW Stadium Hiratsuka; Attendance: 3,209; Referee: Ikkei Enomoto |

| 20 November 2013 Fourth round | Ventforet Kofu | 1–0 (a.e.t.) | Consadole Sapporo | Higashi-ku |
| 19:00 | Patric 113' | Report | | Stadium: Kumamoto Athletics Stadium; Attendance: 523; Referee: Shinji Murakami |

| 22 December 2013 Quarter-final | Sanfrecce Hiroshima | 1–1 (a.e.t.) (3–2 p) | Ventforet Kofu | Hiroshima |
| | Satō 23' | Report | Chiba 45' (o.g.) | Stadium: Hiroshima Big Arch; Attendance: 11,181; Referee: Jumpei Iida |
| | Penalties |
| | Aoyama (penalty scored); Mizumoto (penalty scored); Park Hyung-Jin (penalty scored); Mikić (penalty missed) | | (penalty scored) Gilsinho; (penalty missed) Fukuda; (penalty scored) Miyuki; (penalty missed) Mizuno; (penalty missed) Marquinhos Paraná |

== J.League Cup ==
=== Group stage ===
| Team | Pld | W | D | L | GF | GA | GD | Pts |
|---|---|---|---|---|---|---|---|---|
| Yokohama F. Marinos | 6 | 5 | 0 | 1 | 9 | 2 | +7 | 15 |
| Kawasaki Frontale | 6 | 3 | 2 | 1 | 8 | 4 | +4 | 11 |
| Júbilo Iwata | 6 | 3 | 1 | 2 | 10 | 7 | +3 | 10 |
| Shonan Bellmare | 6 | 2 | 1 | 3 | 4 | 6 | −2 | 7 |
| Omiya Ardija | 6 | 2 | 0 | 4 | 7 | 11 | −4 | 6 |
| Ventforet Kofu | 6 | 1 | 2 | 3 | 6 | 9 | −3 | 5 |
| Shimizu S-Pulse | 6 | 1 | 2 | 3 | 6 | 11 | −5 | 5 |

| 20 March 2013 | Shimizu S-Pulse | 1–1 | Ventforet Kofu | OUTSOURCING Stadium Nihondaira |
| 13:04 | Hattanda 9' | Report | 32' Hugo | Attendance: 9,411; Referee: Ryuji Sato |

| 23 March 2013 | Ventforet Kofu | 0–2 | Yokohama F. Marinos | Yamanashi Chuo Bank Stadium |
| 13:03 | | Report | 23' Hyodo; 52' Nakamachi | Attendance: 8,558; Referee: Hajime Matsuo |

| 3 April 2013 | Ventforet Kofu | 0–1 | Shonan Bellmare | Yamanashi Chuo Bank Stadium |
| 19:00 | | Report | 10' Taketomi | Attendance: 5,923; Referee: Hiroyuki Kimura |

| 10 April 2013 | Omiya Ardija | 1–3 | Ventforet Kofu | NACK5 Stadium |
| 19:00 | Ljubijankič 51' | Report | 24', 29' Kawamoto; 56' (pen.) Ortigoza | Attendance: 3,958; Referee: Ryuji Sato |

| 24 April 2013 | Ventforet Kofu | 1–3 | Kawasaki Frontale | Yamanashi Chuo Bank Stadium |
| 19:00 | Ortigoza 43' | Report | 33' Yajima; 50' Saneto; 81' Ōkubo | Attendance: 4,436; Referee: Stephen Martin |

| 22 May 2013 | Júbilo Iwata | 1–1 | Ventforet Kofu | Yamaha Stadium |
| 19:00 | Komano 6' | | 30' Ortigoza | Attendance: 5,367; Referee: Yamamoto |
