= Kensuke Fukuda =

Japanese footballer

Personal information
- Date of birth: 24 July 1984 (age 42)
- Place of birth: Shizuoka, Japan
- Height: 1.74 m (5 ft 9 in)
- Positions: Right midfielder; left midfielder

Team information
- Current team: Ococias Kyoto
- Number: 29

Youth career
- 1997–2002: Yokohama F. Marinos Youth
- 2003–2006: Meiji University

Senior career*
Years	Team	Apps	(Gls)
2007–2011	Tokyo Verdy	109	(2)
2012–2016	Ventforet Kofu	101	(2)
2017–2018	V-Varen Nagasaki	7	(0)
2019	Tochigi SC	6	(0)
2020–	Ococias Kyoto		
- * Club domestic league appearances and goals as of 00:44, 1 June 2019 (UTC)

Kensuke Fukuda (福田 健介, born 24 July 1984 in Shizuoka) is a Japanese football player who plays for Ococias Kyoto AC.

== Career statistics ==
Updated to 23 February 2017.

Appearances and goals by club, season and competition
Club	Season	League			Emperor's Cup		J.League Cup		Total	
Club	Season	Division	Apps	Goals	Apps	Goals	Apps	Goals	Apps	Goals
Tokyo Verdy	2007	J2 League	15	0	1	0	—		16	0
Tokyo Verdy	2008	J1 League	17	0	1	0	4	0	22	0
Tokyo Verdy	2009	J2 League	18	0	0	0	—		18	0
Tokyo Verdy	2010	J2 League	35	1	1	0	—		36	1
Tokyo Verdy	2011	J2 League	24	1	1	0	—		25	1
Ventforet Kofu	2012	J2 League	41	1	0	0	—		0	0
Ventforet Kofu	2013	J1 League	32	2	2	0	2	0	0	0
Ventforet Kofu	2014	J1 League	17	0	1	0	6	1	0	0
Ventforet Kofu	2015	J1 League	1	0	0	0	0	0	0	0
Ventforet Kofu	2016	J1 League	10	0	1	0	4	0	15	0
Career total			210	4	8	0	16	1	234	5
