= 2014 Ventforet Kofu season =

Ventforet Kofu
2014 season
- Manager: Hiroshi Jofuku
- Stadium: Yamanashi Chuo Bank Stadium
- J1 League: 13th

2014 Ventforet Kofu season.

== J1 League ==
| Match | Date | Team | Score | Team | Venue | Attendance |
|---|---|---|---|---|---|---|
| 1 | 2014.03.01 | Ventforet Kofu | 0-4 | Kashima Antlers | Tokyo National Stadium | 13,809 |
| 2 | 2014.03.08 | FC Tokyo | 1-1 | Ventforet Kofu | Ajinomoto Stadium | 22,398 |
| 3 | 2014.03.15 | Ventforet Kofu | 1-1 | Albirex Niigata | Yamanashi Chuo Bank Stadium | 9,106 |
| 4 | 2014.03.23 | Ventforet Kofu | 1-0 | Yokohama F. Marinos | Yamanashi Chuo Bank Stadium | 12,281 |
| 5 | 2014.03.29 | Vegalta Sendai | 1-1 | Ventforet Kofu | Yurtec Stadium Sendai | 11,144 |
| 6 | 2014.04.06 | Ventforet Kofu | 0-1 | Shimizu S-Pulse | Yamanashi Chuo Bank Stadium | 10,144 |
| 7 | 2014.04.12 | Sagan Tosu | 2-0 | Ventforet Kofu | Best Amenity Stadium | 8,276 |
| 8 | 2014.04.19 | Ventforet Kofu | 2-0 | Nagoya Grampus | Yamanashi Chuo Bank Stadium | 8,197 |
| 9 | 2014.04.26 | Omiya Ardija | 0-2 | Ventforet Kofu | NACK5 Stadium Omiya | 9,882 |
| 10 | 2014.04.29 | Ventforet Kofu | 0-1 | Tokushima Vortis | Yamanashi Chuo Bank Stadium | 8,665 |
| 11 | 2014.05.03 | Kawasaki Frontale | 2-0 | Ventforet Kofu | Kawasaki Todoroki Stadium | 18,261 |
| 12 | 2014.05.06 | Ventforet Kofu | 0-0 | Urawa Reds | Tokyo National Stadium | 36,505 |
| 13 | 2014.05.10 | Vissel Kobe | 1-0 | Ventforet Kofu | Noevir Stadium Kobe | 12,224 |
| 14 | 2014.05.17 | Ventforet Kofu | 3-0 | Kashiwa Reysol | Yamanashi Chuo Bank Stadium | 10,073 |
| 15 | 2014.07.19 | Gamba Osaka | 2-0 | Ventforet Kofu | Expo '70 Commemorative Stadium | 11,373 |
| 16 | 2014.07.23 | Ventforet Kofu | 0-0 | Cerezo Osaka | Yamanashi Chuo Bank Stadium | 12,052 |
| 17 | 2014.07.27 | Sanfrecce Hiroshima | 1-1 | Ventforet Kofu | Edion Stadium Hiroshima | 15,101 |
| 18 | 2014.08.02 | Tokushima Vortis | 2-2 | Ventforet Kofu | Pocarisweat Stadium | 3,594 |
| 19 | 2014.08.09 | Ventforet Kofu | 0-0 | Vegalta Sendai | Yamanashi Chuo Bank Stadium | 8,523 |
| 20 | 2014.08.16 | Kashima Antlers | 1-0 | Ventforet Kofu | Kashima Soccer Stadium | 16,724 |
| 21 | 2014.08.23 | Ventforet Kofu | 3-3 | Gamba Osaka | Yamanashi Chuo Bank Stadium | 12,191 |
| 22 | 2014.08.30 | Kashiwa Reysol | 3-0 | Ventforet Kofu | Hitachi Kashiwa Stadium | 9,022 |
| 23 | 2014.09.13 | Ventforet Kofu | 1-0 | Sagan Tosu | Yamanashi Chuo Bank Stadium | 10,352 |
| 24 | 2014.09.20 | Nagoya Grampus | 2-0 | Ventforet Kofu | Nagoya Mizuho Athletic Stadium | 9,919 |
| 25 | 2014.09.23 | Ventforet Kofu | 2-0 | Vissel Kobe | Yamanashi Chuo Bank Stadium | 9,916 |
| 26 | 2014.09.27 | Yokohama F. Marinos | 0-0 | Ventforet Kofu | NHK Spring Mitsuzawa Football Stadium | 12,953 |
| 27 | 2014.10.05 | Ventforet Kofu | 0-1 | Omiya Ardija | Yamanashi Chuo Bank Stadium | 5,416 |
| 28 | 2014.10.18 | Albirex Niigata | 0-0 | Ventforet Kofu | Denka Big Swan Stadium | 21,964 |
| 29 | 2014.10.22 | Urawa Reds | 0-0 | Ventforet Kofu | Saitama Stadium 2002 | 19,977 |
| 30 | 2014.10.26 | Ventforet Kofu | 2-1 | Kawasaki Frontale | Yamanashi Chuo Bank Stadium | 10,536 |
| 31 | 2014.11.02 | Cerezo Osaka | 1-3 | Ventforet Kofu | Yanmar Stadium Nagai | 23,378 |
| 32 | 2014.11.22 | Ventforet Kofu | 2-0 | Sanfrecce Hiroshima | Yamanashi Chuo Bank Stadium | 14,067 |
| 33 | 2014.11.29 | Ventforet Kofu | 0-0 | FC Tokyo | Yamanashi Chuo Bank Stadium | 15,071 |
| 34 | 2014.12.06 | Shimizu S-Pulse | 0-0 | Ventforet Kofu | IAI Stadium Nihondaira | 19,824 |
