= Kazunari Hosaka =

Japanese footballer

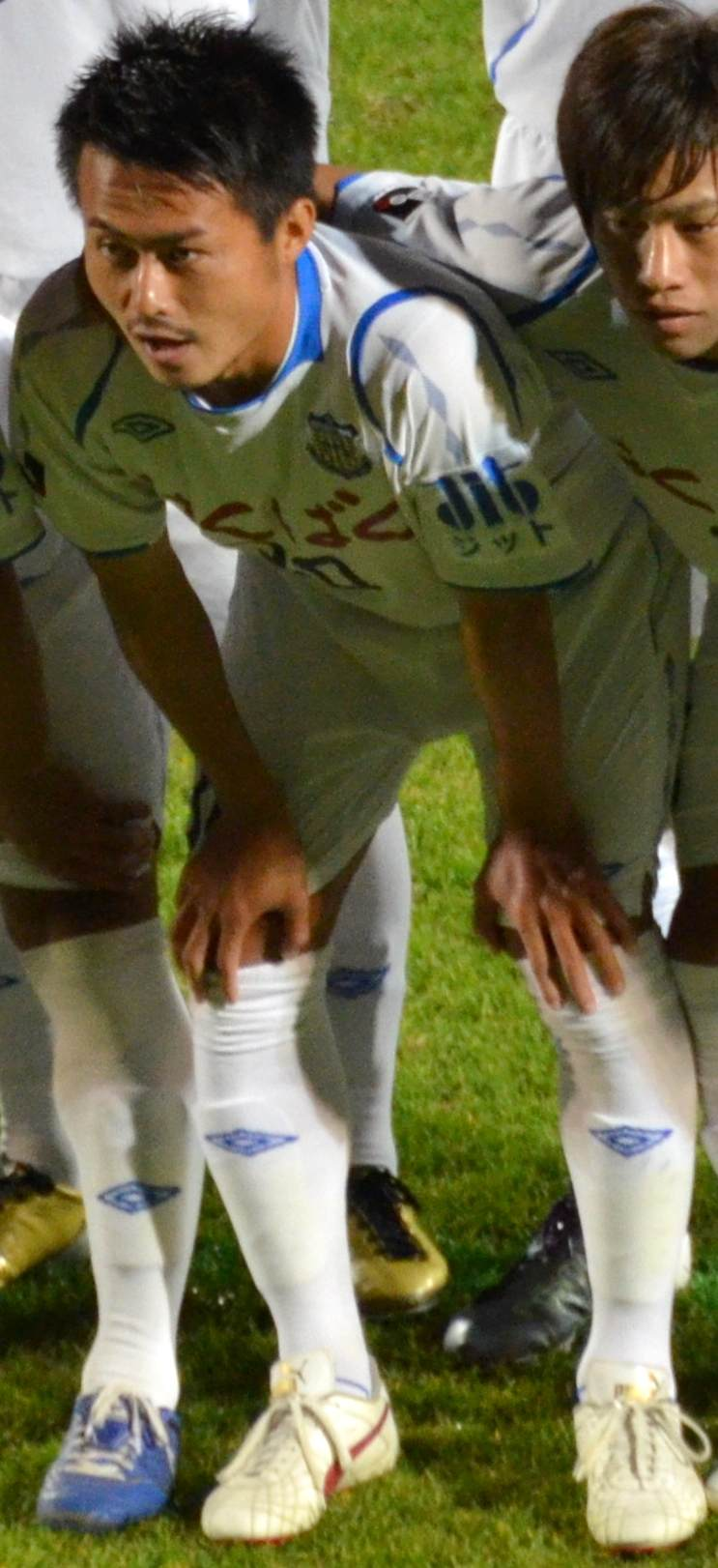

Personal information
- Date of birth: 24 March 1983 (age 43)
- Place of birth: Fuchū, Tokyo, Japan
- Height: 1.72 m (5 ft 8 in)
- Position: Midfielder

Youth career
- 1998–2000: Yomiuri Nippon SC
- 2001–2004: Tokyo Gakugei University

Senior career*
Years	Team	Apps	(Gls)
2005–2008	Ventforet Kofu	26	(4)
2009	Fagiano Okayama	44	(3)
2010–2017	Ventforet Kofu	117	(5)
2018–2020	Tokyo United FC	28	(0)
- * Club domestic league appearances and goals as of 21:14, 4 August 2022 (UTC)

Kazunari Hosaka (保坂 一成, Hosaka Kazunari; born 24 March 1983 in Fuchū, Tokyo) is a Japanese former professional footballer who played as a midfielder.

== Club career statistics ==
As of 4 October 2020.

Appearances and goals by club, season and competition
Club performance			League		Cup		League Cup		Total	
Season	Club	League	Apps	Goals	Apps	Goals	Apps	Goals	Apps	Goals
Japan			League		Emperor's Cup		J. League Cup		Total	
2005	Ventforet Kofu	J2 League	1	0	0	0	-		1	0
2006	Ventforet Kofu	J1 League	8	1	1	0	4	0	13	1
2007	Ventforet Kofu	J1 League	6	3	1	0	5	0	12	3
2008	Ventforet Kofu	J2 League	11	0	1	0	-		12	0
2009	Fagiano Okayama	J2 League	44	3	0	0	-		44	3
2010	Ventforet Kofu	J2 League	25	0	1	0	-		26	0
2011	Ventforet Kofu	J1 League	8	0	1	0	1	0	10	0
2012	Ventforet Kofu	J2 League	24	1	0	0	-		24	1
2013	Ventforet Kofu	J1 League	22	1	2	0	4	0	28	1
2014	Ventforet Kofu	J1 League	8	1	2	0	2	0	12	1
2015	Ventforet Kofu	J1 League	8	1	2	1	5	0	15	2
2016	Ventforet Kofu	J1 League	21	1	0	0	1	0	22	1
2017	Ventforet Kofu	J1 League	1	0	1	0	6	1	8	1
2018	Tokyo United FC	KSL	15	0	-		-		15	0
2019	Tokyo United FC	KSL	10	0	-		-		10	0
2020	Tokyo United FC	KSL	3	0	-		-		3	0
Total			215	12	12	1	28	1	255	14
