= Davi (footballer, born March 1984) =

Brazilian footballer

Personal information
- Full name: Davi José Silva do Nascimento
- Date of birth: 10 March 1984 (age 42)
- Place of birth: Fortaleza, Brazil
- Height: 1.83 m (6 ft 0 in)
- Position: Forward

Youth career
- 2000–2001: Ceará
- 2002: Maranguape

Senior career*
Years	Team	Apps	(Gls)
2003–2004	Ipitanga		
2005–2007	Vitória		(8)
2006	→ CSA (loan)		
2007	→ Consadole Sapporo (loan)	39	(17)
2008	Consadole Sapporo	26	(16)
2009	Nagoya Grampus	17	(10)
2009–2012	Umm-Salal		
2011	→ Beijing Guoan (loan)	0	(0)
2011–2012	→ Ventforet Kofu (loan)	46	(32)
2013–2015	Kashima Antlers	61	(20)
2016	Ventforet Kofu	10	(1)
2017	Matsumoto Yamaga	3	(0)
2018	Giravanz Kitakyushu	18	(4)
- * Club domestic league appearances and goals

Davi José Silva do Nascimento, or simply Davi (born 10 March 1984), is a Brazilian former professional footballer who played as a forward.

== Club career ==
Davi was born in Fortaleza. Only three seasons after his arrive in Ibaraki, he was released by the club on 26 November.

Davi left Giravanz Kitakyushu at the end of 2018.

== Career statistics ==
Appearances and goals by club, season and competition
Club	Season	League			National cup (Note: Includes Emperor's Cup.)		League cup (Note: Includes J. League Cup.)		Continental		Total	
Club	Season	Division	Apps	Goals	Apps	Goals	Apps	Goals	Apps	Goals	Apps	Goals
Consadole Sapporo	2007	J2 League	39	17	0	0	–		–		39	17
Consadole Sapporo	2008	J1 League	26	16	1	0	5	0	–		32	16
Consadole Sapporo	Total		65	33	1	0	5	0	0	0	71	33
Nagoya Grampus	2009	J1 League	17	10	–		1	0	6	2	24	12
Ventforet Kofu	2011	J1 League	10	0	1	0	0	0	–		11	0
Ventforet Kofu	2012	J2 League	36	32	0	0	0	0	–		36	32
Ventforet Kofu	Total		46	32	1	0	0	0	0	0	47	32
Kashima Antlers	2013	J1 League	26	10	2	1	8	5	–		36	16
Kashima Antlers	2014	J1 League	25	10	1	1	5	2	–		31	13
Kashima Antlers	2015	J1 League	10	0	1	0	2	0	0	0	13	0
Kashima Antlers	Total		61	20	4	2	15	7	0	0	90	29
Ventforet Kofu	2016	J1 League	10	1	1	0	0	0	–		11	1
Matsumoto Yamaga	2017	J2 League	3	0	0	0	–		–		3	0
Giravanz Kitakyushu	2018	J3 League	18	4	–		–		–		18	4

== Honours ==
- Bahia State League: 2005
- J2 League: 2007, 2012
