= Hideomi Yamamoto =

Japanese footballer (born 1980)

Hideomi Yamamoto 山本 英臣
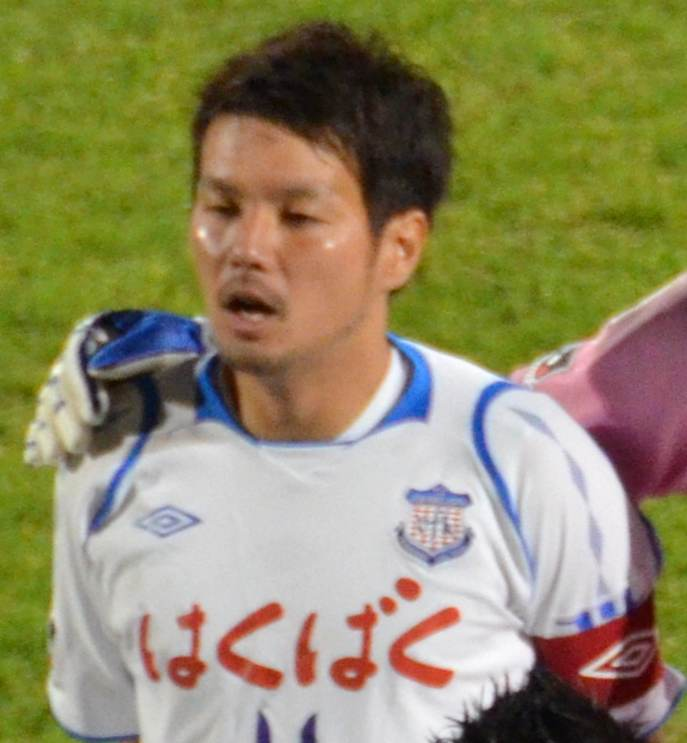

Personal information
- Full name: Hideomi Yamamoto
- Date of birth: June 26, 1980 (age 46)
- Place of birth: Ichikawa, Chiba, Japan
- Height: 1.75 m (5 ft 9 in)
- Position: Defender

Team information
- Current team: Ventforet Kofu
- Number: 4

Youth career
- 1993–1998: JEF United Ichihara

Senior career*
Years	Team	Apps	(Gls)
1999–2002	JEF United Ichihara	4	(0)
2003–	Ventforet Kofu	593	(14)
- * Club domestic league appearances and goals as of 17 August 2026

Hideomi Yamamoto (山本 英臣, Yamamoto Hideomi; born June 26, 1980) is a Japanese football player who plays for Ventforet Kofu.

== Playing career ==
Yamamoto was born in Ichikawa on June 26, 1980. He joined J1 League club JEF United Ichihara from youth team in 1999. He debuted against Nagoya Grampus Eight on March 17, 2001 and played several matches in 2001 season. However he could hardly play in the match in 2002. In 2003, he moved to J2 League club Ventforet Kofu. He played many matches as substitute from 2003. In 2005, Ventforet finished at the 3rd place and was promoted to J1 first time in the club history. He also became a regular player as left side-back from 2006. After that, Ventforet repeated relegation to J2 and promotion to J1. From 2010, he played mainly as center back and defensive midfielder for a long time.

He scored the winning penalty in the 2022 Emperor's Cup Final, helping Ventforet Kofu to win the title at the penalty shoot-outs by 5–4.

== Club statistics ==
As of 5 December 2021

Club performance			League		Cup		League Cup		Total	
Season	Club	League	Apps	Goals	Apps	Goals	Apps	Goals	Apps	Goals
Japan			League		Emperor's Cup		J.League Cup		Total	
1999	JEF United Ichihara	J1 League	0	0	0	0	0	0	0	0
2000	JEF United Ichihara	J1 League	0	0	0	0	0	0	0	0
2001	JEF United Ichihara	J1 League	4	0	1	0	4	0	9	0
2002	JEF United Ichihara	J1 League	0	0	0	0	2	0	2	0
2003	Ventforet Kofu	J2 League	34	3	2	0	-		36	3
2004	Ventforet Kofu	J2 League	18	1	0	0	-		18	1
2005	Ventforet Kofu	J2 League	20	0	2	0	-		24	0
2006	Ventforet Kofu	J1 League	32	0	3	0	4	0	39	0
2007	Ventforet Kofu	J1 League	29	0	1	0	8	0	38	0
2008	Ventforet Kofu	J2 League	39	0	2	0	-		41	0
2009	Ventforet Kofu	J2 League	48	1	3	0	-		51	1
2010	Ventforet Kofu	J2 League	28	2	1	0	-		29	2
2011	Ventforet Kofu	J1 League	30	0	1	0	1	0	32	0
2012	Ventforet Kofu	J2 League	40	2	1	0	-		41	2
2013	Ventforet Kofu	J1 League	29	0	3	0	1	0	33	0
2014	Ventforet Kofu	J1 League	33	3	2	0	4	0	39	3
2015	Ventforet Kofu	J1 League	28	0	0	0	2	0	30	0
2016	Ventforet Kofu	J1 League	24	1	0	0	1	0	25	1
2017	Ventforet Kofu	J1 League	14	0	0	0	0	0	14	0
2018	Ventforet Kofu	J2 League	21	0	2	0	2	0	25	0
2019	Ventforet Kofu	J2 League	16	1	1	0	-		17	1
2020	Ventforet Kofu	J2 League	34	0	-		-		34	0
2021	Ventforet Kofu	J2 League	23	0	1	0	-		24	0
2022	Ventforet Kofu	J2 League								
Total			544	14	26	0	29	0	601	14

== Honours ==
=== Club ===
Ventforet Kofu

- Emperor's Cup: 2022
