= Douglas (footballer, born 1985) =

Brazilian footballer

Douglas Marques
Personal information
- Full name: Douglas Marques dos Santos
- Date of birth: May 18, 1985 (age 41)
- Place of birth: São Paulo, Brazil
- Height: 1.85 m (6 ft 1 in)
- Position: Central defender

Team information
- Current team: XV de Novembro

Youth career
- 2003–2005: Atlético Paranaense

Senior career*
Years	Team	Apps	(Gls)
2005–2010	Atlético Paranaense	13	(0)
2006	→ Paulista (loan)	-	(-)
2007	→ Joinville (loan)	-	(-)
2007–2008	→ Santo André (loan)	28	(1)
2009	→ Flamengo (loan)	0	(0)
2009	→ São Caetano (loan)	2	(0)
2010	→ Mirassol (loan)	16	(0)
2010	→ Santo André (loan)	25	(0)
2011	Grêmio Prudente	9	(0)
2012–2013	Ventforet Kofu	30	(1)
2013–2014	Figueirense	17	(0)
2014	Yokohama FC	38	(2)
2015	Capivariano	0	(0)
2015	Oeste	4	(0)
2015–2016	CSA	12	(1)
2016	Ceará	5	(0)
2017	CSA		(0)
2018	Santo André		(0)
2019–	XV de Novembro		(0)
- * Club domestic league appearances and goals

Douglas Marques dos Santos (born May 18, 1985, in São Paulo), commonly known as Douglas or Douglas Santos, is a Brazilian central defender. He currently plays for XV de Novembro.

== Career ==
He made his professional debut for Atlético-PR in a 1–2 defeat against Paysandu in the Campeonato Brasileiro on August 13, 2005.

In December 2008 transferred on loan to Flamengo for 2009 season.

=== Flamengo career statistics ===
(Correct as of July 11, 2009)

Club	Season	Carioca League			Brazilian Série A			Brazilian Cup			Copa Libertadores			Copa Sudamericana			Total		
Club	Season	Apps	Goals	Assists	Apps	Goals	Assists	Apps	Goals	Assists	Apps	Goals	Assists	Apps	Goals	Assists	Apps	Goals	Assists
Flamengo	2009	2	1	0	0	0	0	-	-	-	-	-	-	-	-	-	2	1	0

according to combined sources on the.

== Honours ==
Flamengo

- Taça Rio: 2009
- Rio de Janeiro State League: 2009

== Contract ==
- Atlético-PR 1 January 2009 to 30 April 2012.
