= Hiroyuki Takasaki =

Japanese footballer

Hiroyuki Takasaki 高崎 寛之
Personal information
- Full name: Hiroyuki Takasaki
- Date of birth: March 17, 1986 (age 40)
- Place of birth: Yachiyo, Ibaraki, Japan
- Height: 1.88 m (6 ft 2 in)
- Position: Striker

Team information
- Current team: Antelope Shiojiri
- Number: 9

Youth career
- 2004–2007: Komazawa University

Senior career*
Years	Team	Apps	(Gls)
2008–2011	Urawa Red Diamonds	22	(3)
2009	→ Mito HollyHock (loan)	46	(19)
2012	Ventforet Kofu	27	(5)
2013–2014	Tokushima Vortis	55	(9)
2015–2016	Kashima Antlers	13	(0)
2015	→ Montedio Yamagata (loan)	9	(0)
2016	→ Matsumoto Yamaga (loan)	38	(16)
2017–2019	Matsumoto Yamaga	99	(26)
2020	FC Gifu	15	(5)
2021	Saigon	5	(0)
2021	Ventforet Kofu	3	(0)
2022–	Antelope Shiojiri	27	(8)
Medal record
Urawa Red Diamonds
Runner-up	J.League Cup	2011
Kashima Antlers
Winner	J1 League	2016
Winner	J.League Cup	2015
Winner	Emperor's Cup	2016
- * Club domestic league appearances and goals as of 22 September 2024

Hiroyuki Takasaki (高崎 寛之, Takasaki Hiroyuki; born March 17, 1986) is a Japanese football player who plays for sixth-tier club Antelope Shiojiri.

== Club statistics ==
Updated to 24 February 2019.

Club	Season	League		Emperor's Cup		J. League Cup		AFC		Other^{1}		Total	
Club	Season	Apps	Goals	Apps	Goals	Apps	Goals	Apps	Goals	Apps	Goals	Apps	Goals
Urawa Red Diamonds	2008	2	0	0	0	3	0	0	0	–		5	0
Mito HollyHock	2009	46	19	0	0	–		–		–		46	19
Urawa Red Diamonds	2010	5	1	2	1	3	0	–		–		10	2
Urawa Red Diamonds	2011	15	2	3	1	3	0	–		–		21	3
Ventforet Kofu	2012	27	5	1	0	–		–		–		28	5
Tokushima Vortis	2013	25	2	1	0	–		–		2	0	28	2
Tokushima Vortis	2014	30	7	0	0	3	0	–		–		33	7
Kashima Antlers	2015	13	0	–		–		6	2	–		19	2
Montedio Yamagata	2015	9	0	2	2	–		–		–		11	2
Kashima Antlers	2016	0	0	0	0	0	0	–		–		0	0
Matsumoto Yamaga	2016	37	16	1	1	–		–		1	0	39	17
Matsumoto Yamaga	2017	41	19	1	0	–		–		–		42	19
Matsumoto Yamaga	2018	41	7	1	0	–		–		–		42	8
Career total		291	78	12	5	12	0	6	2	3	0	324	84

^{1}Includes J2 Playoffs.
