= Makoto Watanabe (footballer) =

Japanese footballer

Makoto Watanabe 渡辺 誠
Personal information
- Full name: Makoto Watanabe
- Date of birth: September 25, 1980 (age 46)
- Place of birth: Shizuoka, Japan
- Height: 1.70 m (5 ft 7 in)
- Position: Midfielder

Youth career
- 1996–1998: Shizuoka Gakuen High School

College career
Years	Team	Apps	(Gls)
1999–2002	Kokushikan University		

Senior career*
Years	Team	Apps	(Gls)
2003–2004	Ventforet Kofu	3	(0)
2005–2010	Kataller Toyama	159	(16)
Total		162	(16)
- * Club domestic league appearances and goals

Makoto Watanabe (渡辺 誠, Watanabe Makoto; born September 25, 1980) is a former Japanese football player.

== Club statistics ==
Club performance			League		Cup		Total	
Season	Club	League	Apps	Goals	Apps	Goals	Apps	Goals
Japan			League		Emperor's Cup		Total	
1999	Kokushikan University	Football League	2	0	2	0	4	0
2000	Kokushikan University	Football League	13	0	-		13	0
2001	Kokushikan University	Football League	13	1	-		13	1
2002	Kokushikan University	Football League	5	1			5	1
2003	Ventforet Kofu	J2 League	1	0	0	0	1	0
2004	Ventforet Kofu	J2 League	2	0	1	0	3	0
2005	ALO's Hokuriku	Football League	22	1	4	0	26	1
2006	ALO's Hokuriku	Football League	30	7	-		30	7
2007	ALO's Hokuriku	Football League	32	1	2	0	34	1
2008	Kataller Toyama	Football League	29	4	2	0	31	4
2009	Kataller Toyama	J2 League	26	1	0	0	26	1
2010	Kataller Toyama	J2 League						
Total			175	16	11	0	186	16
