= Satoru Sakuma =

Japanese footballer and manager

Satoru Sakuma 佐久間 悟
Personal information
- Full name: Satoru Sakuma
- Date of birth: July 7, 1963 (age 63)
- Place of birth: Tokyo, Japan
- Height: 1.77 m (5 ft 9 1/2 in)
- Position: Defender

Youth career
- Josai University Kawagoe High School
- Komazawa University

Senior career*
Years	Team	Apps	(Gls)
????–1991	NTT Kanto	25	(0)
Total		25	(0)

Managerial career
- 2007: Omiya Ardija
- 2011: Ventforet Kofu
- 2015–2016: Ventforet Kofu
- * Club domestic league appearances and goals

Satoru Sakuma (佐久間 悟, Sakuma Satoru; born July 7, 1963) is a former Japanese football player and manager.

== Playing career ==
Sakuma was born in Tokyo on July 7, 1963. After graduating from Komazawa University, he played for NTT Kanto until 1991.

== Coaching career ==
After retirement, Sakuma became coach at NTT Kanto (later Omiya Ardija) in 1991. In August 2007, manager Robert Verbeek was sacked for poor performance when Ardija was at the 16th place of 18 clubs. Sakuma became a new manager as Verbeek successor. He managed until end of the season and Ardija finished at 15th place and remaining in J1 League. In October 2008, he moved to Ventforet Kofu and became a general manager. In August 2011, manager Toshiya Miura was sacked for poor performance. Sakuma became a new manager as Miura's successor. However, Ventforet results were bad and was relegated to J2. Sakuma returned to general manager from 2012. In May 2015, manager Yasuhiro Higuchi was sacked and Sakuma became a manager again. He managed until the end of the 2016 season.

== Managerial statistics ==
Team	From	To	Record				
Team	From	To	G	W	D	L	Win %
Omiya Ardija	2007	2007	16	5	4	7	31.25
Ventforet Kofu	2011	2011	14	5	1	8	35.71
Ventforet Kofu	2015	2016	57	15	17	25	26.32
Total			87	25	22	40	28.74
