= Naoki Hatada =

Japanese footballer

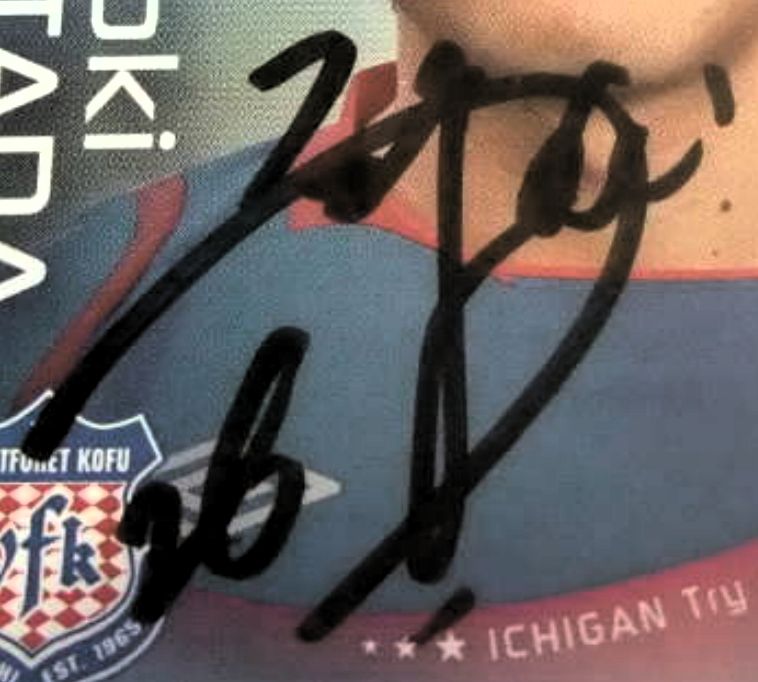
- Autograph in 2010

Personal information
- Full name: Naoki Hatada
- Date of birth: September 11, 1990 (age 36)
- Place of birth: Matsudo, Japan
- Height: 1.72 m (5 ft 7 1/2 in)
- Position: Midfielder

Youth career
- 2000–2008: Kashiwa Reysol

Senior career*
Years	Team	Apps	(Gls)
2009–2012	Ventforet Kofu	6	(1)
2011	→ Blaublitz Akita (loan)	32	(4)
2013–2014	Nagano Parceiro	44	(12)
2015	Gainare Tottori	34	(7)
2016	Blaublitz Akita	4	(0)
- * Club domestic league appearances and goals as of 20 July 2020

Naoki Hatada (畑田 真輝, Hatada Naoki; born September 11, 1990) is a Japanese former football player who last played for Blaublitz Akita.

== Career statistics ==
Updated to 23 February 2016.

Appearances and goals by club, season and competition
Club	Season	League			Emperor's Cup		Total	
Club	Season	Division	Apps	Goals	Apps	Goals	Apps	Goals
Ventforet Kofu	2009	J2 League	0	0	1	0	1	0
Ventforet Kofu	2010	J2 League	1	0	1	1	2	1
Blaublitz Akita	2011	JFL	32	4	2	0	34	4
Ventforet Kofu	2012	J2 League	5	1	1	0	6	1
Nagano Parceiro	2013	JFL	29	6	3	1	32	7
Nagano Parceiro	2014	J3 League	15	6	1	0	16	6
Gainare Tottori	2015	J3 League	34	7	1	0	35	7
Career total			116	24	10	2	126	26
