= Masaru Matsuhashi =

Japanese footballer

Masaru Matsuhashi 松橋 優
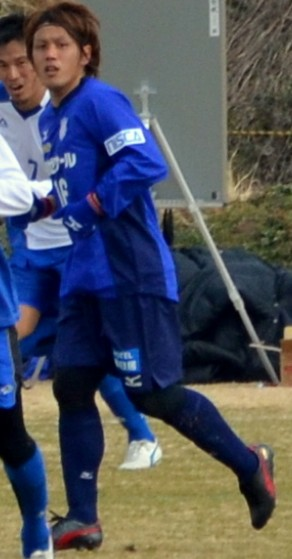

Personal information
- Full name: Masaru Matsuhashi
- Date of birth: March 22, 1985 (age 41)
- Place of birth: Isahaya, Nagasaki, Japan
- Height: 1.73 m (5 ft 8 in)
- Positions: Striker; defender

Youth career
- 2000–2002: Kunimi High School
- 2003–2006: Waseda University

Senior career*
Years	Team	Apps	(Gls)
2007–2008	Oita Trinita	20	(2)
2009–2019	Ventforet Kofu	185	(8)
Medal record
Oita Trinita
Winner	J.League Cup	2008
- * Club domestic league appearances and goals as of 31 December 2019

Masaru Matsuhashi (松橋 優, Matsuhashi Masaru; born March 22, 1985, in Isahaya, Nagasaki) is a former Japanese football player who mostly played for Ventforet Kofu.

His older brother Shota is also a professional football player.

== Career statistics ==
Updated to 23 February 2020.

Appearances and goals by club, season and competition
Club	Season	League			Emperor's Cup		J.League Cup		Total	
Club	Season	Division	Apps	Goals	Apps	Goals	Apps	Goals	Apps	Goals
Oita Trinita	2007	J1 League	7	1	0	0	2	0	9	1
Oita Trinita	2008	J1 League	13	1	1	0	7	0	21	1
Ventforet Kofu	2009	J2 League	26	4	2	0	—		28	4
Ventforet Kofu	2010	J2 League	16	1	1	0	—		17	1
Ventforet Kofu	2011	J1 League	12	1	1	0	2	0	15	1
Ventforet Kofu	2012	J2 League	14	0	1	0	—		15	0
Ventforet Kofu	2013	J1 League	19	0	2	0	1	0	22	0
Ventforet Kofu	2014	J1 League	12	0	2	0	4	0	18	0
Ventforet Kofu	2015	J1 League	19	0	2	0	3	0	24	0
Ventforet Kofu	2016	J1 League	29	1	1	0	3	0	33	1
Ventforet Kofu	2017	J1 League	29	1	0	0	0	0	29	1
Ventforet Kofu	2018	J2 League	15	0	2	0	3	0	20	0
Ventforet Kofu	2019	J2 League	4	0	3	0	—		7	0
Career total			205	10	18	0	25	0	248	10
