= Atsushi Izawa =

Japanese footballer

Personal information
- Date of birth: 23 July 1989 (age 37)
- Place of birth: Nerima, Tokyo, Japan
- Height: 1.70 m (5 ft 7 in)
- Position: Midfielder

Team information
- Current team: Tochigi Uva FC
- Number: 10

Youth career
- 2002–2007: F.C. Tokyo Youth

Senior career*
Years	Team	Apps	(Gls)
2008–2014	Ventforet Kofu	64	(6)
2014	→ Kataller Toyama (loan)	14	(0)
2015–2017	Tokushima Vortis	16	(0)
2018–	Tochigi Uva FC		
- * Club domestic league appearances and goals as of 23 February 2018

Atsushi Izawa (井澤 惇, Izawa Atsushi; born 23 July 1989 in Nerima, Tokyo) is a Japanese footballer who plays for Tochigi Uva FC.

== Career statistics ==
Updated to 23 February 2018.

Appearances and goals by club, season and competition
Club	Season	League			Emperor's Cup		J.League Cup		Total	
Club	Season	Division	Apps	Goals	Apps	Goals	Apps	Goals	Apps	Goals
Ventforet Kofu	2008	J2 League	1	0	0	0	—		1	0
Ventforet Kofu	2009	J2 League	8	2	2	0	—		10	2
Ventforet Kofu	2010	J2 League	0	0	1	0	—		1	0
Ventforet Kofu	2011	J1 League	14	2	1	0	0	0	15	2
Ventforet Kofu	2012	J2 League	31	2	1	0	–		32	2
Ventforet Kofu	2013	J1 League	10	0	0	0	5	0	15	0
Ventforet Kofu	2014	J1 League	0	0	0	0	0	0	0	0
Kataller Toyama	2014	J2 League	14	0	0	0	–		14	0
Tokushima Vortis	2015	J2 League	7	0	0	0	–		7	0
Tokushima Vortis	2016	J2 League	4	0	3	0	–		7	0
Tokushima Vortis	2017	J2 League	5	0	1	0	–		6	0
Career total			94	6	9	0	5	0	108	6
