= Takahiro Kuniyoshi =

Japanese footballer

Takahiro Kuniyoshi 國吉 貴博
Personal information
- Full name: Takahiro Kuniyoshi
- Date of birth: May 28, 1988 (age 38)
- Place of birth: Kawagoe, Saitama, Japan
- Height: 1.70 m (5 ft 7 in)
- Position: Midfielder

Youth career
- 2004–2006: Shizuoka Gakuen; High School

Senior career*
Years	Team	Apps	(Gls)
2007–2011	Ventforet Kofu	19	(5)
2011	→ Sagan Tosu (loan)	24	(1)
2012	Sagan Tosu	0	(0)
2012	→ Kataller Toyama (loan)	9	(2)
2013–2017	Kataller Toyama	144	(3)
- * Club domestic league appearances and goals as of 23 February 2018

Takahiro Kuniyoshi (國吉 貴博, Kuniyoshi Takahiro; born May 28, 1988 in Kawagoe, Saitama) is a Japanese football player who last featured for Kataller Toyama.

== Club career statistics ==
Updated to 23 February 2018.

Club performance			League		Cup		League Cup		Total	
Season	Club	League	Apps	Goals	Apps	Goals	Apps	Goals	Apps	Goals
Japan			League		Emperor's Cup		J. League Cup		Total	
2007	Ventforet Kofu	J1 League	1	0	1	0	1	0	3	0
2008	Ventforet Kofu	J2 League	0	0	0	0	-		0	0
2009	Ventforet Kofu	J2 League	16	5	1	0	-		17	5
2010	Ventforet Kofu	J2 League	2	0	1	0	-		3	0
2011	Sagan Tosu	J2 League	24	1	1	0	-		25	1
2012	Sagan Tosu	J1 League	0	0	-		6	0	6	0
2012	Kataller Toyama	J2 League	9	2	1	0	-		10	2
2013	Kataller Toyama	J2 League	38	1	1	0	-		39	1
2014	Kataller Toyama	J2 League	22	0	1	0	-		23	0
2015	Kataller Toyama	J3 League	35	2	-		-		35	2
2016	Kataller Toyama	J3 League	25	0	0	0	-		25	0
2017	Kataller Toyama	J3 League	24	0	1	1	-		25	1
Total			196	11	8	1	7	0	211	12
