= 2011 Ventforet Kofu season =

Ventforet Kofu
2011 season
- Manager: Kazuo Uchida
- J. League Division 1: 16th (Relegated to J2)
- Emperor's Cup: Third round
- J. League Cup: First round
Home colours	Away colours

The 2011 Ventforet Kofu season was Ventforet Kofu's first season in J. League Division 1 since 2007, making it the third overall in J1. Ventforet finished 15th and were relegated to Division 2. Ventforet got knocked out in the first round of the 2011 J. League Cup and third round of the 2011 Emperor's Cup.

== Competitions ==
=== J. League ===
==== League table ====
Pos	Team	Pld	W	D	L	GF	GA	GD	Pts	Qualification or relegation
14	Albirex Niigata	34	10	9	15	38	46	−8	39	
15	Urawa Red Diamonds	34	8	12	14	36	43	−7	36	
16	Ventforet Kofu (R)	34	9	6	19	42	63	−21	33	Relegation to 2012 J. League Division 2
17	Avispa Fukuoka (R)	34	6	4	24	34	75	−41	22	Relegation to 2012 J. League Division 2
18	Montedio Yamagata (R)	34	5	6	23	23	64	−41	21	Relegation to 2012 J. League Division 2

Updated to match(es) played on December 3, 2011. Source: J.League Division 1
Rules for classification: 1st points; 2nd goal differential; 3rd goals scored; 4th head-to-head results; 5th disciplinary points; 6th draw. If two clubs are tied for first place, both clubs will be declared.
(R) Relegated

==== Matches ====
5 March 2011 Round 1	Ventforet Kofu	0 - 1	Jubilo Iwata	Yamanashi Chuo Bank Stadium
Saturday 14:03		Report	81' Yamamoto	Attendance: 15,040; Referee: Matsumura

=== Emperor's Cup ===
2011-10-08 Second round	Ventforet Kofu	2 – 1	Machida Zelvia	Yamanashi Chuo Bank Stadium, Kōfu
15:00	Uchiyama 6'; Paulinho 36'	Report	Suzuki 51'	Attendance: 3,421; Referee: Koichiro Fukushima

2011-11-16 Third round	Kashiwa Reysol	6 – 1	Ventforet Kofu	Hitachi Kashiwa Soccer Stadium, Kashiwa
19:00	Jorge Wagner 10'; Kudo 26'; Kitajima 29'; Hashimoto 37'; Tanaka 67', 80'	Report	Yabu 13'	Attendance: 3,950; Referee: Takuya Maeda
