= Yohei Onishi =

Japanese footballer

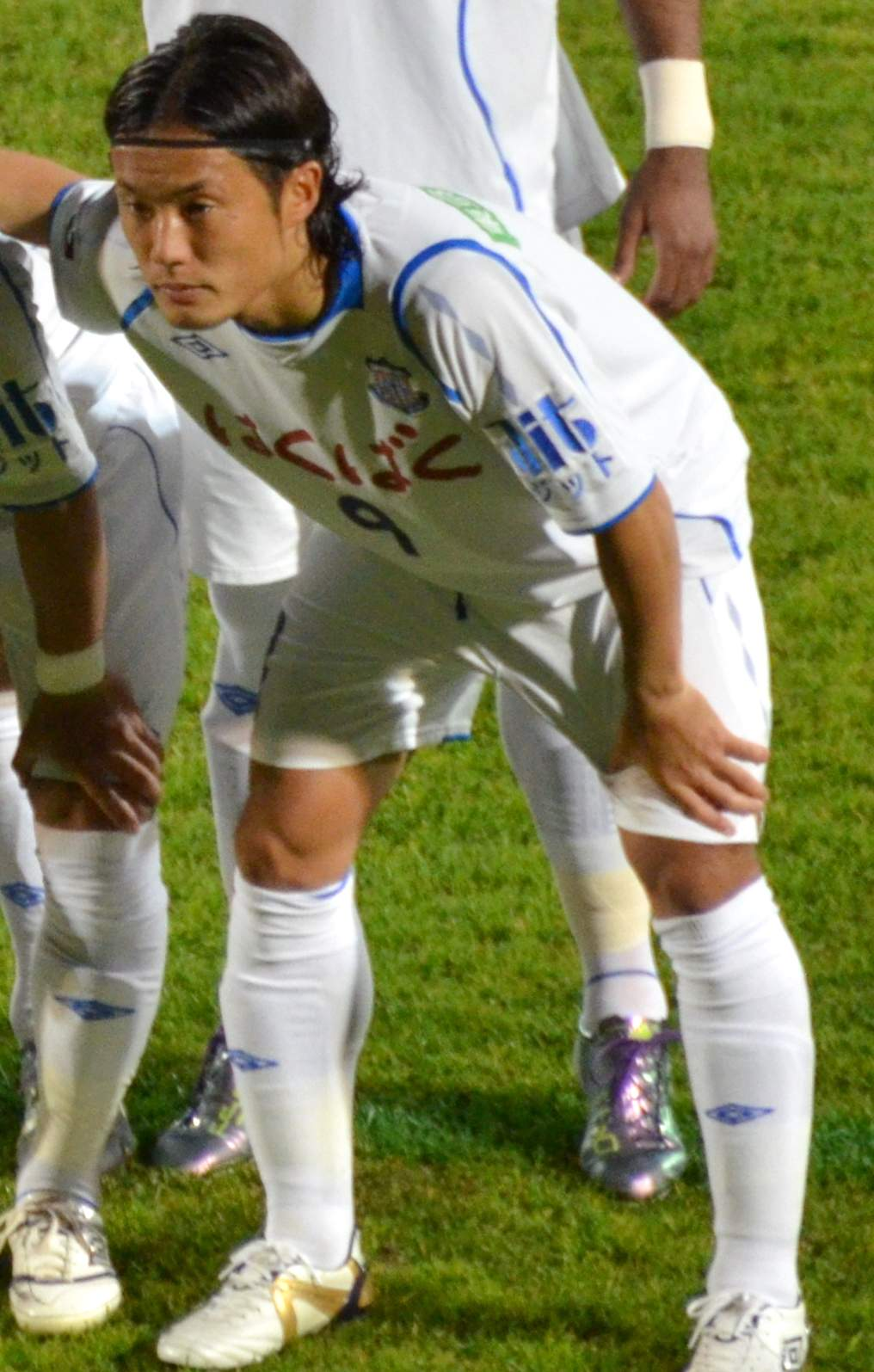

Personal information
- Full name: Yohei Onishi
- Date of birth: October 30, 1982 (age 44)
- Place of birth: Okayama, Japan
- Height: 1.70 m (5 ft 7 in)
- Position: Midfielder

Youth career
- 2001–2004: Hannan University

Senior career*
Years	Team	Apps	(Gls)
2005–2010	Ventforet Kofu	134	(14)
2011–2015	Kataller Toyama	161	(6)
Total		295	(20)
- * Club domestic league appearances and goals

Yohei Onishi (大西 容平, Ōnishi Yōhei; born October 30, 1982) is a former Japanese soccer player.

== Career statistics ==
Appearances and goals by club, season and competition
Club	Season	League			Emperor's Cup		J.League Cup		Total	
Club	Season	Division	Apps	Goals	Apps	Goals	Apps	Goals	Apps	Goals
Ventforet Kofu	2005	J2 League	4	0	1	0	-		5	0
Ventforet Kofu	2006	J1 League	16	0	0	0	3	0	19	0
Ventforet Kofu	2007	J1 League	18	0	2	0	3	0	23	0
Ventforet Kofu	2008	J2 League	34	6	2	1	-		36	7
Ventforet Kofu	2009	J2 League	46	8	3	0	-		49	8
Ventforet Kofu	2010	J2 League	16	0	0	0	-		16	0
Kataller Toyama	2011	J2 League	37	1	2	0	-		39	1
Kataller Toyama	2012	J2 League	39	1	1	0	-		40	1
Kataller Toyama	2013	J2 League	34	1	1	0	-		35	1
Kataller Toyama	2014	J2 League					-			
Career total			244	17	12	1	6	0	262	18
