= Kensaku Abe =

Japanese footballer

Kensaku Abe 阿部 謙作
Personal information
- Full name: Kensaku Abe
- Date of birth: May 13, 1980 (age 46)
- Place of birth: Kanagawa, Japan
- Height: 1.81 m (5 ft 11 1/2 in)
- Position: Goalkeeper

Youth career
- 1996–1998: Tokai University Daiichi High School

College career
Years	Team	Apps	(Gls)
1999–2002	University of Tsukuba		

Senior career*
Years	Team	Apps	(Gls)
2003–2009	Ventforet Kofu	155	(0)
2005	→ Vissel Kobe (loan)	0	(0)
Total		155	(0)
- * Club domestic league appearances and goals

Kensaku Abe (阿部 謙作, Kensaku Abe; born May 13, 1980) is a former Japanese football player.

== Career statistics ==
Appearances and goals by club, season and competition
Club	Season	League			Emperor's Cup		J.League Cup		Total	
Club	Season	Division	Apps	Goals	Apps	Goals	Apps	Goals	Apps	Goals
Ventforet Kofu	2003	J2 League	30	0	0	0	—		30	0
Ventforet Kofu	2004	J2 League	39	0	2	0	—		41	0
Vissel Kobe	2005	J1 League	0	0	0	0	1	0	1	0
Ventforet Kofu	2005	J2 League	18	0	2	0	—		20	0
Ventforet Kofu	2006	J1 League	30	0	3	0	6	0	39	0
Ventforet Kofu	2007	J1 League	19	0	0	0	5	0	24	0
Ventforet Kofu	2008	J2 League	12	0	2	0	—		14	0
Ventforet Kofu	2009	J2 League	7	0	3	0	—		10	0
Career total			155	0	12	0	12	0	179	0
