= Takuma Tsuda =

Japanese footballer

Takuma Tsuda 津田 琢磨
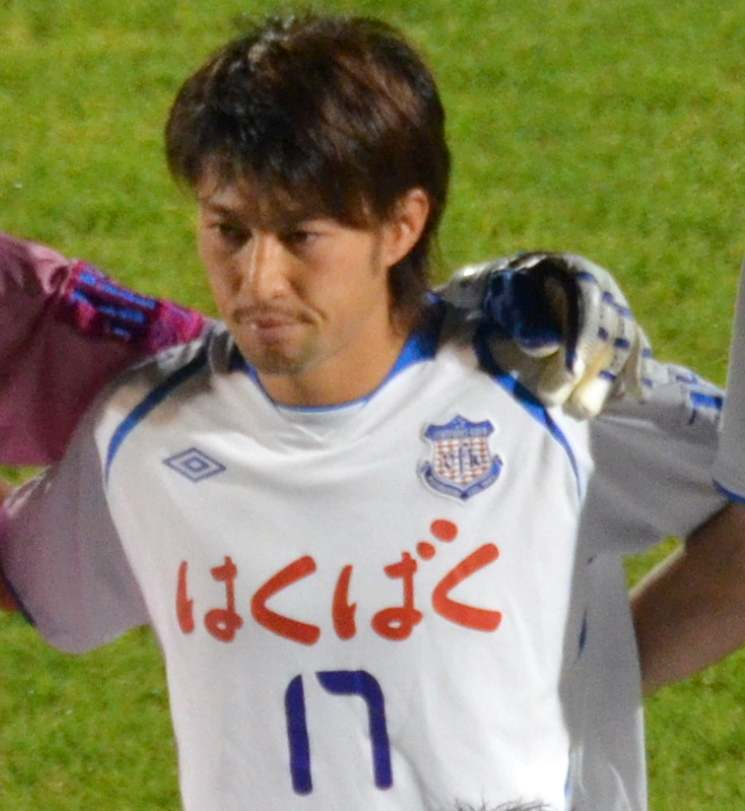

Personal information
- Full name: Takuma Tsuda
- Date of birth: October 4, 1980 (age 46)
- Place of birth: Kuki, Saitama, Japan
- Height: 1.79 m (5 ft 10 1/2 in)
- Position: Defender

Youth career
- 1996–1998: Hanasaki Tokuharu High School
- 1999–2002: Teikyo University

Senior career*
Years	Team	Apps	(Gls)
2003–2007	Ventforet Kofu	72	(5)
2008	Ehime FC	13	(0)
2008–2017	Ventforet Kofu	107	(3)
2018	Tochigi Uva FC	18	(0)
Total		210	(8)
- * Club domestic league appearances and goals

Takuma Tsuda (津田 琢磨, Tsuda Takuma; born October 4, 1980) is a former Japanese football player.

== Career statistics ==
Appearances and goals by club, season and competition
Club	Season	League			Emperor's Cup		J.League Cup		Total	
Club	Season	Division	Apps	Goals	Apps	Goals	Apps	Goals	Apps	Goals
Ventforet Kofu	2003	J2 League	7	0	3	0	—		10	0
Ventforet Kofu	2004	J2 League	29	4	1	0	—		30	4
Ventforet Kofu	2005	J2 League	25	1	0	0	—		25	1
Ventforet Kofu	2006	J1 League	5	0	2	0	3	0	10	0
Ventforet Kofu	2007	J1 League	6	0	0	0	1	0	7	0
Ehime FC	2008	J2 League	13	0	0	0	—		13	0
Ventforet Kofu	2008	J2 League	0	0	0	0	—		0	0
Ventforet Kofu	2009	J2 League	8	0	1	0	—		9	0
Ventforet Kofu	2010	J2 League	13	0	1	0	—		14	0
Ventforet Kofu	2011	J1 League	6	0	1	0	2	0	9	0
Ventforet Kofu	2012	J2 League	23	1	0	0	—		23	1
Ventforet Kofu	2013	J1 League	3	0	0	0	4	0	7	0
Ventforet Kofu	2014	J1 League	2	0	2	0	1	0	5	0
Ventforet Kofu	2015	J1 League	27	0	2	0	1	0	30	0
Ventforet Kofu	2016	J1 League	25	2	1	0	1	0	27	2
Ventforet Kofu	2017	J1 League	0	0	1	0	3	0	4	0
Career total			200	8	15	0	16	0	231	8
