= 2009 J.League Division 2 =

Club football season in Japan

J.League Division 2
- Season: 2009
- Champions: Vegalta Sendai; 1st J2 title 1st D2 title
- Promoted: Vegalta Sendai; Cerezo Osaka; Shonan Bellmare
- Matches: 459
- Goals: 1,164 (2.54 per match)
- Top goalscorer: Shinji Kagawa (27 goals total)
- Highest attendance: 22,707 (Round 25, Consadole vs. HollyHock)
- Lowest attendance: 615 (Round 44, Fagiano vs. Tochigi)
- Average attendance: 6,326

The 2009 J. League Division 2 season was the 38th season of the second-tier club football in Japan and the 11th season since the establishment of J2 League. The season started on March 7 and ended on December 5.

In this season, the number of participating clubs was increased by three, making the total number, eighteen. The clubs played in triple round-robin format. Starting this season, all top three clubs were promoted by default and Pro/Rele Series was eliminated accordingly. There were no relegation to the third-tier Japan Football League.

== General ==
=== Promotion and relegation ===
- Consadole Sapporo and Tokyo Verdy were relegated to J2
- Fagiano Okayama, Kataller Toyama and Tochigi SC were promoted from the JFL.

=== Changes in competition format ===
- Fourth foreign slot (AFC slot) has been created to each club's roster.
- Promotion/relegation Series had been eliminated to accommodate the 18-club J2; Division 2 club which finishes third place at the end of the season will receive automatic promotion to J1.

=== Changes in clubs ===
none

== Clubs ==
Locations of the 2009 J.League 2 teams

Eighteen clubs played in J. League Division 2 during the 2009 season. Of these clubs, Consadole Sapporo and Tokyo Verdy were relegated from Division 1 last year. Tochigi S.C., Kataller Toyama, and Fagiano Okayama newly joined from Japan Football League.

- Consadole Sapporo
- Vegalta Sendai
- Mito HollyHock
- Tochigi S.C.
- Thespa Kusatsu
- Tokyo Verdy
- Yokohama F.C.
- Shonan Bellmare
- Ventforet Kofu
- Kataller Toyama
- F.C. Gifu
- Cerezo Osaka
- Fagiano Okayama
- Tokushima Vortis
- Ehime F.C.
- Avispa Fukuoka
- Sagan Tosu
- Roasso Kumamoto

== League format ==
Eighteen clubs will play in triple round-robin format, a total of 51 games each. A club receives 3 points for a win, 1 point for a tie, and 0 points for a loss. The clubs are ranked by points, and tie breakers are, in the following order:

- Goal differential
- Goals scored
- Head-to-head results
- Disciplinary points

A draw would be conducted, if necessary. However, if two clubs are tied at the first place, both clubs will be declared as the champions. The top three clubs will be promoted to J1.

Changes from Previous Year

- Eighteen participating clubs, increased by three from last year
- Number of games per club increased to 51, up from 42.
- The fourth foreign player slot (AFC player slot) is introduced
- Top three clubs now receives promotion by default; during 2004–2008 seasons, the third place club needed to win playoffs for the promotion.

== Final league table ==
Pos	Team	Pld	W	D	L	GF	GA	GD	Pts	Promotion
1	Vegalta Sendai (C, P)	51	32	10	9	87	39	+48	106	Promotion to 2010 J. League Division 1
2	Cerezo Osaka (P)	51	31	11	9	100	53	+47	104	Promotion to 2010 J. League Division 1
3	Shonan Bellmare (P)	51	29	11	11	84	52	+32	98	Promotion to 2010 J. League Division 1
4	Ventforet Kofu	51	28	13	10	76	46	+30	97	
5	Sagan Tosu	51	25	13	13	71	51	+20	88	
6	Consadole Sapporo	51	21	16	14	74	61	+13	79	
7	Tokyo Verdy	51	21	11	19	68	61	+7	74	
8	Mito HollyHock	51	21	10	20	70	79	−9	73	
9	Tokushima Vortis	51	19	15	17	67	52	+15	72	
10	Thespa Kusatsu	51	18	11	22	64	76	−12	65	
11	Avispa Fukuoka	51	17	14	20	52	71	−19	65	
12	FC Gifu	51	16	14	21	62	72	−10	62	
13	Kataller Toyama	51	15	16	20	48	58	−10	61	
14	Roasso Kumamoto	51	16	10	25	66	82	−16	58	
15	Ehime FC	51	12	11	28	54	80	−26	47	
16	Yokohama FC	51	11	11	29	43	70	−27	44	
17	Tochigi SC	51	8	13	30	38	77	−39	37	
18	Fagiano Okayama	51	8	12	31	40	84	−44	36	

Updated to match(es) played on December 5, 2009. Source: J.League Division 2
Rules for classification: 1) points; 2) goal difference; 3) number of goals scored.
(C) Champions; (P) Promoted

== Final results ==
Rounds 1 and 2
Home \ Away	VEG	CER	BEL	VEN	SAG	CON	VER	HOL	VOR	SPA	AVI	GIF	KAT	ROS	EHI	YFC	TOC	FAG
Vegalta Sendai		1–2	2–1	0–1	1–0	1–1	2–2	2–1	2–2	1–1	3–1	2–0	3–1	3–2	3–1	2–1	1–0	1–0
Cerezo Osaka	0–0		3–4	0–0	4–1	3–0	2–2	5–3	2–1	1–0	4–1	1–0	2–3	4–1	4–2	2–0	1–0	4–1
Shonan Bellmare	1–0	1–0		2–1	1–0	3–2	2–0	1–0	1–2	1–1	2–3	2–2	5–0	3–3	1–0	2–1	1–1	2–1
Ventforet Kofu	2–1	1–1	1–0		0–1	2–1	2–1	1–1	3–1	1–0	6–0	2–2	1–2	4–1	3–0	2–0	1–1	0–2
Sagan Tosu	2–1	2–0	4–3	1–1		1–2	0–0	1–3	0–2	4–2	3–1	1–1	0–0	0–1	0–2	1–0	2–2	0–0
Consadole Sapporo	0–1	4–1	0–1	0–0	1–2		1–1	0–1	1–1	1–2	3–0	3–0	1–1	0–1	3–2	1–1	3–2	4–2
Tokyo Verdy	1–3	1–2	2–1	1–2	2–0	1–2		0–0	4–0	0–3	0–0	3–0	1–0	2–4	2–0	2–1	1–0	3–0
Mito HollyHock	0–5	2–3	1–5	0–1	2–0	0–0	2–0		1–0	2–1	5–0	3–3	1–1	1–0	1–0	0–1	3–1	4–3
Tokushima Vortis	0–1	2–2	0–0	2–1	1–1	3–3	0–0	0–2		1–3	2–1	3–1	1–2	3–0	6–0	2–0	2–1	1–0
Thespa Kusatsu	0–3	2–4	2–0	1–2	1–3	1–2	0–2	2–2	1–1		3–2	0–1	0–0	1–1	2–2	3–2	0–1	1–1
Avispa Fukuoka	1–0	2–2	0–3	2–4	0–0	0–0	1–2	1–2	1–1	1–2		0–1	0–0	1–1	1–0	1–0	1–0	0–0
FC Gifu	0–2	2–1	2–2	0–1	0–1	0–2	0–0	1–1	3–0	1–0	0–2		0–0	1–0	2–1	2–0	1–1	4–0
Kataller Toyama	0–3	0–0	1–0	1–1	0–0	0–0	0–3	1–2	0–1	1–0	1–1	3–0		1–0	1–2	2–0	0–1	1–2
Roasso Kumamoto	0–3	0–3	0–2	0–1	1–2	4–0	0–2	1–3	0–3	1–2	2–3	5–2	2–3		1–1	1–1	2–0	1–1
Ehime FC	2–1	0–1	2–4	2–0	2–3	1–2	0–1	3–1	0–2	1–3	3–0	3–0	1–3	0–2		0–3	0–0	0–0
Yokohama FC	1–0	2–2	0–2	1–3	0–3	0–1	3–1	0–0	1–2	0–2	0–1	1–1	0–0	1–2	0–0		1–2	1–0
Tochigi SC	1–2	1–3	0–1	3–3	0–5	0–1	0–3	2–3	0–0	0–0	0–2	0–1	0–4	1–1	1–2	1–0		1–0
Fagiano Okayama	0–0	0–2	0–1	0–0	0–3	1–1	3–2	0–1	1–0	0–3	1–0	0–0	1–2	2–3	1–3	1–1	2–0	

Updated to match(es) played on August 16, 2009. Source: J. League Division 2
Legend: Blue = home team win; Yellow = draw; Red = away team win.

Round 3
Home \ Away	VEG	CER	BEL	VEN	SAG	CON	VER	HOL	VOR	SPA	AVI	GIF	KAT	ROS	EHI	YFC	TOC	FAG
Vegalta Sendai		1–0				1–0				2–0		2–1		1–0	1–1	1–0	2–0	4–2
Cerezo Osaka			2–1	1–1				0–1		5–0	0–0	2–1			3–1		1–0	
Shonan Bellmare	1–1				1–0		2–2		1–0	0–0					1–0	1–0	1–1	3–1
Ventforet Kofu	1–1		2–3			2–1		2–0					1–0	2–1	1–1	0–1		
Sagan Tosu	1–1	2–1		1–2			2–1				3–1	1–0	1–0			2–1		0–0
Consadole Sapporo		0–1	2–0		3–3			1–1			1–0		1–1		3–2	3–1	1–0	
Tokyo Verdy	0–2	2–4		0–1		2–2		2–0		2–1	1–0		0–1	0–2				
Mito HollyHock	0–4		2–3		1–3				0–3					0–1	1–0		0–2	4–2
Tokushima Vortis	0–4	0–0		0–1	0–1	3–0	0–1			1–1				6–0				4–1
Thespa Kusatsu				1–0	0–1	2–5		2–0			1–2	1–0		0–6			3–2	2–1
Avispa Fukuoka	2–0		0–1	2–1				3–1	0–0			1–0	1–1				3–1	
FC Gifu			1–1	1–2		2–4	1–1	3–1	2–1						3–3	3–2		
Kataller Toyama	2–3	0–1	0–3					2–3	0–0	0–2		0–2						2–0
Roasso Kumamoto		0–2	1–0		2–1	0–0					0–1	2–5	2–0			1–1		
Ehime FC					0–0		3–1		0–1	2–1	0–1		1–0	1–1		0–2		0–1
Yokohama FC		0–3					2–0	1–1	1–0	1–2	2–2		1–3				1–0	2–1
Tochigi SC				1–2	0–2		2–3		0–0			2–1	1–1	0–2	1–1			
Fagiano Okayama		1–3		0–1		0–1	0–2				2–2	0–2		2–1			0–1	

Updated to match(es) played on December 5, 2009. Source: J. League Division 2
Legend: Blue = home team win; Yellow = draw; Red = away team win.

== Top scorers ==
Rank	Scorer	Club	Goals
1	(Japan) Shinji Kagawa	Cerezo Osaka	27
2	(Japan) Ken Tokura	Thespa Kusatsu	23
3	(Japan) Masashi Oguro	Tokyo Verdy	21
4	(Japan) Takashi Inui	Cerezo Osaka	20
5	(Brazil) Maranhão	Ventforet Kofu	19
5	(Japan) Hiroyuki Takasaki	Mito HollyHock	19
5	(Brazil) Thiago Quirino	Consadole Sapporo	19
8	(Japan) Yoshihiro Uchimura	Ehime FC	18
9	(Japan) Tetsuya Okubo	Avispa Fukuoka	16
9	(Japan) Koichi Sato	FC Gifu	16
9	(Brazil) Marcelo Soares	Vegalta Sendai	16

== Attendance ==
Pos	Team	Total	High	Low	Average	Change
1	Vegalta Sendai	336,719	19,063	7,154	12,951	−8.0%
2	Ventforet Kofu	276,463	16,844	5,582	11,059	+6.8%
3	Consadole Sapporo	265,376	22,707	5,112	10,207	−29.8%^{†}
4	Cerezo Osaka	247,796	20,727	4,837	9,912	−6.1%
5	Avispa Fukuoka	194,071	16,531	2,869	7,763	−23.0%
6	Shonan Bellmare	189,088	14,080	3,301	7,273	+21.3%
7	Fagiano Okayama	154,039	13,228	615	6,162	+68.1%^{‡}
8	Roasso Kumamoto	150,150	19,321	2,337	6,006	+13.8%
9	Sagan Tosu	154,408	13,211	3,103	5,939	−18.2%
10	Tokyo Verdy	143,539	9,378	2,564	5,521	−62.8%^{†}
11	Tochigi SC	117,643	15,857	1,819	4,706	−6.8%^{‡}
12	Thespa Kusatsu	112,584	8,276	1,579	4,330	+2.7%
13	FC Gifu	107,557	9,113	1,492	4,302	+14.9%
14	Tokushima Vortis	105,897	13,473	1,842	4,073	+5.5%
15	Kataller Toyama	93,507	5,520	1,862	3,740	−13.1%^{‡}
16	Ehime FC	96,054	12,851	1,633	3,694	−0.3%
17	Yokohama FC	91,898	5,489	1,541	3,535	−48.0%
18	Mito HollyHock	66,818	8,463	1,206	2,673	−12.2%
	League total	2,903,607	20,727	615	6,326	−10.5%

Updated to games played on December 5, 2009
Source: J. League Division 2
Notes:
^{†} Team played previous season in J1.
^{‡} Team played previous season in JFL.
