= JIT Recycle Ink Stadium =

Building in Kofu, Yamanashi Prefecture, Japan

JIT Recycle Ink Stadium JIT リサイクルインク スタジアム
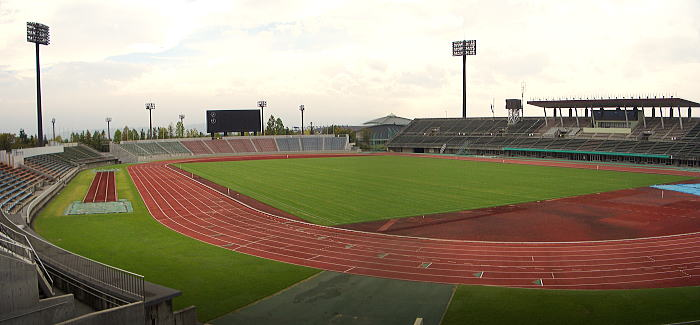
- Interactive map of JIT Recycle Ink Stadium; JIT リサイクルインク スタジアム
- Former names: Kose Sports Park Stadium; Yamanashi Chuo Bank Stadium
- Location: Kofu, Japan
- Coordinates: 35°37′21″N 138°35′23″E
- Owner: Yamanashi Prefecture
- Operator: Yamanashi Prefectural Sports Association
- Capacity: 15,853
- Surface: Grass
- Field size: 106 x 69 m

Construction
- Opened: 1985
- Renovated: 1997
- Expanded: 2005

Tenant
- Ventforet Kōfu

JIT Recycle Ink Stadium (JIT リサイクルインク スタジアム) is a multi-purpose stadium in Kōfu, Yamanashi Prefecture, Japan. It is currently used mostly for football matches. It serves as a home ground of Ventforet Kōfu. The stadium holds 15,853 people and was built in 1985.

It is also used sometimes for Top League rugby union games and frequently for high school athletics events.

It was formerly known as Kose Sports Park Stadium. Since March 2011 it has been called Yamanashi Chuo Bank Stadium for the naming rights.
