= 2012 Gainare Tottori season =

Gainare Tottori
2012 season
- Manager: Hideo Yoshizawa
- J.League Division 2: 20th of 22
- Emperor's Cup: 3rd round
Home colours	Away colours

The 2012 Gainare Tottori season sees Gainare Tottori compete in J.League Division 2 for the second consecutive season. Gainare Tottori are also competing in the 2012 Emperor's Cup.

== Competitions ==
=== J. League ===
==== League table ====
Pos	Team	Pld	W	D	L	GF	GA	GD	Pts	Promotion or relegation
18	Avispa Fukuoka	42	9	14	19	53	68	−15	41	
19	Kataller Toyama	42	9	11	22	38	59	−21	38	
20	Gainare Tottori	42	11	5	26	33	78	−45	38	
21	FC Gifu	42	7	14	21	27	55	−28	35	
22	Machida Zelvia (R)	42	7	11	24	34	67	−33	32	Relegation to 2013 Japan Football League (Note: The promotion and relegation between J2 and JFL will take place only if more than one promotion-eligible (i.e. having a J.League Associate Membership) JFL team finished above second place and playoff will be played only if a eligible JFL team finished in second place (See the corresponding section for further details). As only 2012 Japan Football League Champion V-Varen Nagasaki has the Associate Membership among the top 2 teams. Machida Zelvia was relegated immediately but no relegation/playoff was taken place for FC Gifu which finished 21st.)

Updated to match(es) played on 11 November 2012. Source: J.League Division 2
Rules for classification: 1st points; 2nd goal differential; 3rd goals scored; 4th head-to-head results; 5th disciplinary points; 6th draw. If two clubs are tied for first place, both clubs will be declared champions.
(R) Relegated

==== Matches ====
4 March 2012 1	F.C. Gifu	2 - 2	Gainare Tottori	Gifu Nagaragawa Stadium
Sunday 15:04	Satō 20'; Someya 45'	Report	9' Nagira; 61' Own-goal	Attendance: 3,321; Referee: Sato

11 March 2012 2	Roasso Kumamoto	2 - 1	Gainare Tottori	Kumamoto Athletics Stadium
Sunday 16:04	Taketomi 46'; Fujimoto 52'	Report	10' Koide	Attendance: 5,817; Referee: Noda

17 March 2012 3	Gainare Tottori	0 - 3	Machida Zelvia	THE TOTTORI BANK Bird Stadium
Saturday 13:04		Report	47' Hiramoto; 89', 90' Katsumata	Attendance: 2,477; Referee: Ueda

20 March 2012 4	Gainare Tottori	2 - 1	Kyoto Sanga	THE TOTTORI BANK Bird Stadium
Tuesday 19:03	Togawa 26'; Fukui 55'	Report	86' Miyayoshi	Attendance: 2,781; Referee: Ikeuchi

25 March 2012 5	Avispa Fukuoka	4 - 0	Gainare Tottori	LEVEL-5 Stadium
Sunday 13:03	Sakata 27', 41'; Sueyoshi 46'; Takahashi 51'	Report		Attendance: 4,017; Referee: Imamura

1 April 2012 6	Gainare Tottori	1 - 2	Shonan Bellmare	THE TOTTORI BANK Bird Stadium
14:00 JST	Mori (yellow card) 19'; Mizumoto (yellow card) 68'; Fukui 90+1'	Report	Shimamura 49'; Miyazaki 89'; Furuhashi (yellow card) 90'	Attendance: 2,086; Referee: (Japan) Shoichiro Mikami

8 April 2012 7	Giravanz Kitakyushu	1 - 0	Gainare Tottori	Honjō Athletic Stadium
14:00 JST	Watari 62'	Report	Kumazawa (yellow card) 26'	Attendance: 3,230; Referee: (Japan) Hiroyuki Onishi

15 April 2012 8	Gainare Tottori	0 - 0	Ventforet Kofu	THE TOTTORI BANK Bird Stadium
17:00 JST	Miura (yellow card) 57' (yellow-red card) 85'; Mizumoto (yellow card) 64'; Koide (yellow card) 90'	Report	Sasaki (yellow card) 53' (yellow-red card) 83'; Yamamoto (yellow card) 56'; Takasaki (yellow card) 63'; Fukuda (yellow card) 70'	Attendance: 2,526; Referee: (Japan) Ryuji Sato

22 April 2012 9	Fagiano Okayama	2 - 0	Gainare Tottori	Kanko Stadium
17:00 JST	Kawamata 39'; Ishihara (yellow card) 42'; Goto (yellow card) 62' (goal) 66'; Nakabayashi (yellow card) 86'	Report	Okuyama (yellow card) 28'; Fukui (yellow card) 50'	Attendance: 5,851; Referee: (Japan) Hiromichi Oka

27 April 2012 10	Gainare Tottori	1 - 4	Ehime	THE TOTTORI BANK Bird Stadium
20:30 JST	Miura (yellow card) 25'; Okano (yellow card) 82'; Cunningham (yellow card) 84' (goal) 90+2'	Report	Tomić (yellow card) 36' (goal) 46'; Arita 37'; Azuma 52'; Akai 70'; Tamori (yellow card) 90+3'	Attendance: 2,245; Referee: (Japan) Tetsuro Yoshida

30 April 2012 11	Tochigi S.C.	0 - 1	Gainare Tottori	Tochigi Green Stadium
14:00 JST	Cha Young-Hwan (yellow card) 15'	Report	Ozaki (yellow card) 48' (goal) 90+3'; Sumida (yellow card) 80'	Attendance: 3,827; Referee: (Japan) Masuya Ueda

3 May 2012 12	Gainare Tottori	1 - 0	Kataller Toyama	THE TOTTORI BANK Bird Stadium
18:00 JST	Mio 29'; Okano (yellow card) 44'; Mizumoto (yellow card) 45+2'	Report	Fukuda (yellow card) 73'	Attendance: 2,551; Referee: (Japan) Koei Koya

6 May 2012 13	Oita Trinita	3 - 0	Gainare Tottori	Ōita Bank Dome
15:00 JST	Murai 3'; Takamatsu 65', 74'; Miyazawa (yellow card) 69'; Ishigami (yellow card) 81'	Report	Okano (yellow card) 36'	Attendance: 8,085; Referee: (Japan) Eiji Kawai

13 May 2012 14	Gainare Tottori	2 - 1	Mito HollyHock	THE TOTTORI BANK Bird Stadium
17:00 JST	Mio 42'; Mizumoto (yellow card) 50' (yellow-red card) 65'; Koide 52'; Okuyama (yellow card) 90+1'	Report	Romero Berrocal Frank Lark (yellow card) 59'; Okamoto 71'; Yoshihara (yellow card) 90+2'	Attendance: 2,501; Referee: (Japan) Shoichiro Mikami

20 May 2012 15	Tokushima Vortis	3 - 0	Gainare Tottori	Pocarisweat Stadium
14:00 JST	Nasukawa (yellow card) 5'; Uesato (yellow card) 11'; Hanai 38'; Tsuda 61'; Douglas 87' (pen.)	Report	Nagira (yellow card) 23'; Kato (yellow card) 55'; Togawa (yellow card) 85'	Attendance: 3,933; Referee: (Japan) Yoshiro Imamura

27 May 2012 16	Gainare Tottori	2 - 5	Yokohama	THE TOTTORI BANK Bird Stadium
14:00 JST	Sumida 4', 69'; Okuyama (yellow card) 78'	Report	Takeoka 26', 48'; Tahara 39'; Fujita 45'; Miura 80'	Attendance: 5,016; Referee: (Japan) Yuki Noda

2 June 2012 17	Montedio Yamagata	5 - 1	Gainare Tottori	ND Soft Stadium Yamagata
17:00 JST	Ishii 39'; Miyasaka 48', 53'; Nakashima 65' (pen.), 85'; Maeda (yellow card) 90+2'	Report	Yoshino (yellow card) 21'; Sanenobu 56'; Mizumoto (yellow card) 63'; Ozaki (red card) 63'	Attendance: 6,703; Referee: (Japan) Futoshi Nakamura

9 June 2012 18	Gainare Tottori	0 - 2	Tokyo Verdy	THE TOTTORI BANK Bird Stadium
20:00 JST		Report	Abe 45', 68' (yellow card) 52'; Tsuchiya (yellow card) 58'	Attendance: 3,508; Referee: (Japan) Yosuke Kubota

13 June 2012 19	JEF United Ichihara Chiba	3 - 1	Gainare Tottori	Fukuda Denshi Arena
20:00 JST	Fujita 1'; Hyodo 27', 49'	Report	Okuyama (yellow card) 61'; Sanenobu 75' (pen.)	Attendance: 7,309; Referee: (Japan) Minoru Tojo

17 June 2012 20	Gainare Tottori	0 - 1	Matsumoto Yamaga	THE TOTTORI BANK Bird Stadium
19:00 JST	Sanenobu (yellow card) 50'; Miura (yellow card) 77'; Kato (yellow card) 87'	Report	Funayama 33'; Eydison (yellow card) 80'; Iida (yellow card) 82'	Attendance: 2,712; Referee: (Japan) Tetsuro Yoshida

24 June 2012 21	Thespa Kusatsu	1 - 2	Gainare Tottori	Shoda Shoyu Stadium Gunma
20:30 JST	Nagata (yellow card) 9'; Tatsushi Koyanagi (yellow card) 18'; Kobayashi (yellow card) 52'; Heberty 72'	Report	Sumida 15', 56' (yellow card) 52'	Attendance: 1,894; Referee: (Japan) Haruki Hidaka

1 July 2012 22	Gainare Tottori	1 - 2	Giravanz Kitakyushu	THE TOTTORI BANK Bird Stadium
19:00 JST	Togawa 4'; Fukui (yellow card) 6' (yellow-red card) 29'	Report	Leonardo 33', 43' (yellow card) 68'; Fuji (yellow card) 36' (yellow-red card) 68'; Ikemoto (yellow card) 49'; Tada (yellow card) 80'; Oshima (yellow card) 88'; Seki (yellow card) 90'	Attendance: 2,313; Referee: (Japan) Hiromichi Oka

8 July 2012 23	Gainare Tottori	0 - 2	Tochigi S.C.	THE TOTTORI BANK Bird Stadium
19:00 JST	Sumida (yellow card) 20'	Report	Sabia (yellow card) 28'; Akai (yellow card) 49'; Hirose 54'; Kikuoka 87'	Attendance: 2,478; Referee: (Japan) Yosuke Kubota

15 July 2012 24	Tokyo Verdy	1 - 0	Gainare Tottori	Ajinomoto Stadium
19:00 JST	Mori (yellow card) 26'; Sugimoto 66'	Report		Attendance: 4,151; Referee: (Japan) Tomohiro Tsukada

22 July 2012 25	Yokohama	3 - 1	Gainare Tottori	Nippatsu Mitsuzawa Stadium
19:00 JST	Takachi 31'; Sugiyama (yellow card) 53'; Abe 72'; Nozaki 77'	Report	Nagira (yellow card) 66'; Kubo 75'	Attendance: 9,687; Referee: (Japan) Koji Morikawa

29 July 2012 26	Gainare Tottori	1 - 0	Gifu	THE TOTTORI BANK Bird Stadium
19:00 JST	Fujimoto (yellow card) 8'; Mori 68'; Miura (yellow card) 69'	Report	Hirota (yellow card) 43'; Inoue (yellow card) 45+2'	Attendance: 5,125; Referee: (Japan) Shoichiro Mikami

5 August 2012 27	Kyoto Sanga	3 - 1	Gainare Tottori	Nishikyogoku Athletic Stadium
20:00 JST	Bajalica (yellow card) 18'; Someya (yellow card) 39'; Komai 54', 88'; Ando 64'; Nakayama (yellow card) 67'	Report	Okuyama (yellow card) 61'; Ozaki (yellow card) 66'; Mio 89'; Cunningham (yellow card) 90+2'	Attendance: 5,041; Referee: (Japan) Haruki Hidaka

12 August 2012 28	Gainare Tottori	0 - 2	Fagiano Okayama	THE TOTTORI BANK Bird Stadium
20:00 JST	Ozaki (yellow card) 59'	Report	Kawamata 29'; Ueda (yellow card) 36'; Takeda 79'; Hiroaki Kamijo (yellow card) 90+2'	Attendance: 6,629; Referee: (Japan) Naohito Ogawa

19 August 2012 29	Gainare Tottori	2 - 1	JEF United Ichihara Chiba	THE TOTTORI BANK Bird Stadium
19:00 JST	Kato (yellow card) 4'; Tsurumi 38' (yellow card) 86'; Mori 90+1'	Report	Fujita 19'	Attendance: 3,263; Referee: (Japan) Akihiko Ikeuchi

22 August 2012 30	Machida Zelvia	0 - 0	Gainare Tottori	Machida Athletic Stadium
20:00 JST	Suzuki (yellow card) 12'; Fujita (yellow card) 59'	Report		Attendance: 2,592; Referee: (Japan) Taku Nagaya

26 August 2012 31	Gainare Tottori	0 - 3	Tokushima Vortis	THE TOTTORI BANK Bird Stadium
19:00 JST	Mori (yellow card) 21'; Mio (yellow card) 35'	Summary	Hirajima (yellow card) 12'; Aoyama (yellow card) 15'; Nishijima 45', 90+3'; Diogo 87'; Miyazaki (yellow card) 89'	Attendance: 2,842; Referee: (Japan) Hiromichi Oka

2 September 2012 32	Mito HollyHock	2 - 0	Gainare Tottori	K's denki Stadium Mito
19:00 JST	Hashimoto 16' (yellow card) 45'; Homma (yellow card) 50'; Nishioka 88'	Summary	Kato (yellow card) 56'; Mio (yellow card) 66'	Attendance: 3,263; Referee: (Japan) Kazuyuki Hayakawa

14 September 2012 33	Gainare Tottori	2 - 1	Montedio Yamagata	THE TOTTORI BANK Bird Stadium
20:30	Okuyama 16'; Mio 77'	Summary	Ryohei Hayashi 30'	Attendance: 2,617; Referee: (Japan) Hiroyuki Onishi

17 September 2012 34	Ventforet Kofu	1 - 1	Gainare Tottori	Yamanashi Chuo Bank Stadium
17:00	Yamamoto 43'	Summary	Koide 25'; Mori (yellow card) 62'	Attendance: 10,241; Referee: (Japan) Akihiko Ikeuchi

23 September 2012 35	Matsumoto Yamaga	7 - 1	Gainare Tottori	Matsumotodaira Football Stadium
14:00	Fujikawa 9'; Shiozawa 23'; Funayama 30', 57', 69'; Tatara 39'; Iio 90'	Summary	Togawa (yellow card) 35'; Kubo (yellow card) 56'; Sanenobu 90+1'	Attendance: 6,466; Referee: (Japan) Shoichiro Mikami

30 September 2012 36	Gainare Tottori	2 - 0	Thespa Kusatsu	THE TOTTORI BANK Bird Stadium
14:00	Kubo (yellow card) 39'; Mori (yellow card) 45+1'; Koide 55', 80'	Summary	Matsushita (yellow card) 42'; Doi (yellow card) 48' (yellow-red card) 90+1'	Attendance: 1,363; Referee: (Japan) Yosuke Kubota

7 October 2012 37	Kataller Toyama	2 - 1	Gainare Tottori	Toyama Athletic Stadium
14:00	Asahi 38'; Kokeguchi 54'; Seo Yong-Duk (yellow card) 69'	Summary	Ozaki (yellow card) 28'; Kubo 51' (yellow card) 65'	Attendance: 4,434; Referee: (Japan) Yudai Yamamoto

14 October 2012 38	Ehime	0 - 0	Gainare Tottori	Ningineer Stadium
20:00	Tomić (yellow card) 18'; Urata (yellow card) 73'	Summary	Koide (yellow card) 49'; Sumida (yellow card) 78'; Nagira (yellow card) 85'; Miura (yellow card) 88'	Attendance: 3,865; Referee: (Japan) Ryuji Sato

21 October 2012 39	Gainare Tottori	1 - 0	Oita Trinita	THE TOTTORI BANK Bird Stadium
20:00	Tsurumi 31'; Mio (yellow card) 81'	Summary		Attendance: 3,564; Referee: (Japan) Kazuyuki Hayakawa

28 October 2012 40	Gainare Tottori	0 - 1	Roasso Kumamoto	THE TOTTORI BANK Bird Stadium
16:00	Tsurumi (yellow card) 59'	Summary	Katayama (yellow card) 44'; Kurakawa 51'; Yano (yellow card) 80'; Fujimoto (yellow card) 81'	Attendance: 3,120; Referee: (Japan) Masuya Ueda

4 November 2012 41	Shonan Bellmare	1 - 0	Gainare Tottori	Shonan BMW Stadium Hiratsuka
16:00	Kikuchi (yellow card) 6'; Kaoru Takayama (yellow card) 41'; Han Kook-Young (yellow card) 45+1'; Syuhei Otsuki (yellow card) 52'; Macena 88'	Summary	Fukui (yellow card) 40'; Nagira (yellow card) 90+1'	Attendance: 10,674; Referee: (Japan) Hajime Matsuo

11 November 2012 42	Gainare Tottori	-	Avispa Fukuoka	THE TOTTORI BANK Bird Stadium
13:00				Referee: (Japan)

=== Emperor's Cup ===
9 September 2012 Round 2	Gainare Tottori	2 - 1	Thespa Kusatsu	Tottori, Tottori
13:00	Ozaki 52'; Sumida 72'	Report	Hayashi 17'	Stadium: Tottori Bank Bird Stadium; Attendance: 2,031; Referee: Kazuyoshi Enomoto

10 October 2012 Round 3	Kashima Antlers	2 - 1 (a.e.t.)	Gainare Tottori	Kashima
19:00	Masuda 40'; Koroki 110'	Report	Mio 75'	Stadium: Kashima Soccer Stadium; Attendance: 2,606; Referee: Hiroyuki Kimura
