= 2012 Ehime FC season =

Ehime FC
2012 season
- Manager: Ivica Barbarić
- J.League Division 2: 16th
- Emperor's Cup: Second round
Home colours	Away colours

The 2012 Ehime FC season sees Ehime FC compete in J.League Division 2 for the seventh consecutive season. Ehime FC are also competing in the 2012 Emperor's Cup.

== Competitions ==
=== J. League ===
==== League table ====
Pos	Team	Pld	W	D	L	GF	GA	GD	Pts
14	Roasso Kumamoto	42	15	10	17	40	48	−8	55
15	Tokushima Vortis	42	13	12	17	45	49	−4	51
16	Ehime FC	42	12	14	16	47	46	+1	50
17	Thespa Kusatsu	42	12	11	19	31	45	−14	47
18	Avispa Fukuoka	42	9	14	19	53	68	−15	41

Updated to match(es) played on 11 November 2012. Source: J.League Division 2
Rules for classification: 1st points; 2nd goal differential; 3rd goals scored; 4th head-to-head results; 5th disciplinary points; 6th draw. If two clubs are tied for first place, both clubs will be declared champions.

==== Matches ====
4 March 2012 1	Ehime FC	2–0	Machida Zelvia	Ningineer Stadium
Sunday 16:05	Alair 6'; 62' (o.g.)	Report		Attendance: 3,926; Referee: Yamamoto

11 March 2012 2	Yokohama F.C.	0–0	Ehime FC	NHK Spring Mitsuzawa Football Stadium
Sunday 16:04		Report		Attendance: 7,026; Referee: Kubota

17 March 2012 3	Ventforet Kofu	2–1	Ehime FC	Yamanashi Chuo Bank Stadium
Saturday 19:04	Davi 45', 46'	Report	48' Oyama	Attendance: 6,161; Referee: Kawai

20 March 2012 4	Ehime FC	3–0	Matsumoto Yamaga	Ningineer Stadium
Tuesday 16:04	Ishii 14'; Akai 80', 86'	Report		Attendance: 3,598; Referee: Hayakawa

25 March 2012 5	Ehime FC	1–1	Tochigi S.C.	Ningineer Stadium
Sunday 14:04	Arita 60'	Report	34' Hirose	Attendance: 2,838; Referee: Ogawa

1 April 2012 6	Oita Trinita	1–0	Ehime FC	Ōita Bank Dome
Sunday 17:00	Mitsuhira 57'; Choi Jung-Han (yellow card) 62'	Report	Alair (yellow card) 90+1'	Attendance: 8,082; Referee: (Japan) Toshimitsu Yoshida

8 April 2012 7	Ehime FC	4–2	Avispa Fukuoka	Ningineer Stadium
Sunday 14:00	Arita 3', 46'; Urata 42' (yellow card) 49'; Sonoda (yellow card) 43'; Akai 61'	Report	Naruoka 8', 83'; Kobara (yellow card) 39'; Oh Chang-Hyun (yellow card) 45+1'	Attendance: 3,035; Referee: (Japan) Hajime Matsuo

15 April 2012 8	Thespa Kusatsu	1–0	Ehime FC	Shoda Shoyu Stadium Gunma
Sunday 14:00	Lincoln 35'; Hozaki (yellow card) 46'; Tatsushi Koyanagi (yellow card) 81'; Kobayashi (yellow card) 90+1'	Report	Urata (yellow card) 15'; Tomić (yellow card) 78'	Attendance: 2,488; Referee: (Japan) Shoichiro Mikami

22 April 2012 9	Ehime FC	0–0	Roasso Kumamoto	Ningineer Stadium
Sunday 14:00	Tomić (yellow card) 32'; Sekine (yellow card) 80'	Report	Katayama (yellow card) 36'; Yoshii (yellow card) 36'; Takahashi (yellow card) 85'; Fukuo (yellow card) 90+1'	Attendance: 1,950; Referee: (Japan) Masuya Ueda

27 April 2012 10	Gainare Tottori	1–4	Ehime FC	Tottori Bank Bird Stadium
Friday 20:30	Miura (yellow card) 25'; Okano (yellow card) 82'; Cunningham (yellow card) 84' (goal) 90+2'	Report	Tomić (yellow card) 36' (goal) 46'; Arita 37'; Azuma 52'; Akai 70'; Tamori (yellow card) 90+3'	Attendance: 2,245; Referee: (Japan) Tetsuro Yoshida

30 April 2012 11	Ehime FC	2–1	Shonan Bellmare	Ningineer Stadium
Monday 15:00	Arita 27'; Maeno 38'; Sonoda (yellow card) 62'	Report	Ono 83'	Attendance: 3,520; Referee: (Japan) Nobutsugu Murakami

3 May 2012 12	Montedio Yamagata	2–2	Ehime FC	ND Soft Stadium Yamagata
Thursday 14:00	Ishii 36'; Yamazaki 44'; Bandai (yellow card) 45+1'	Report	Uchida (yellow card) 26'; Maeno (yellow card) 38'; Arita 71'; Ishii 80'	Attendance: 7,002; Referee: (Japan) Kazuyoshi Enomoto

6 May 2012 13	JEF United Ichihara Chiba	1–0	Ehime FC	Fukuda Denshi Arena
Sunday 17:00	Tanaka 76'	Report	Sonoda (yellow card) 40'	Attendance: 10,967; Referee: (Japan) Takuto Okabe

12 May 2012 14	Ehime FC	2–2	Giravanz Kitakyushu	Ningineer Stadium
Saturday 15:00	Oyama 2'; Ogasawara (yellow card) 79'; Arita 87' (yellow card) 90+2'	Report	Nakahara 6'; Yasuda (yellow card) 31'; Hanato (yellow card) 32'; Ikemoto (yellow card) 34'; Komorida (yellow card) 54' (goal) 57'; Miyamoto (yellow card) 60'	Attendance: 3,724; Referee: (Japan) Minoru Tojo

20 May 2012 15	Mito HollyHock	0–2	Ehime FC	K's denki Stadium Mito
Sunday 15:00	Wako (yellow card) 53'; Suzuki (yellow card) 85'; Nishioka (yellow card) 90+2'	Report	Ishii (yellow card) 33'; Maeno 39'; Urata (yellow card) 60'; Arita 77'	Attendance: 4,303; Referee: (Japan) Koji Morikawa

27 May 2012 16	Ehime FC	0–1	Kataller Toyama	Ningineer Stadium
Sunday 20:00	Uchida (yellow card) 53'	Report	Onishi (yellow card) 26'; Kato 55'; Fukuda (yellow card) 77'; Kimura (yellow card) 87'	Attendance: 3,910; Referee: (Japan) Kazuyuki Hayakawa

2 June 2012 17	Fagiano Okayama	1–1	Ehime FC	Kanko Stadium
Saturday 17:00	Ueda (yellow card) 41'; Sengoku (yellow card) 50'; Kawamata 70'	Report	Murakami 7'; Tomić (yellow card) 23' (yellow-red card) 90'; Uchida (yellow card) 74'	Attendance: 9,045; Referee: (Japan) Koei Koya

9 June 2012 18	F.C. Gifu	1–1	Ehime FC	Gifu Nagaragawa Stadium
Saturday 20:00	Noda (yellow card) 16'; Inoue 69'	Report	Akai 18' (pen.) (yellow card) 29'; Alair (yellow card) 52'; Arita (yellow card) 70'; Sonoda (yellow card) 75'; Azuma (yellow card) 79'	Attendance: 3,205; Referee: (Japan) Tomohiro Inoue

13 June 2012 19	Ehime FC	2–1	Kyoto Sanga	Ningineer Stadium
Wednesday 20:00	Azuma 54'; Uchida 58'; Ishii (yellow card) 60'	Report	Akimoto (yellow card) 65'; Miyayoshi 81'	Attendance: 2,875; Referee: (Japan) Koichiro Fukushima

17 June 2012 20	Tokushima Vortis	3–0	Ehime FC	Pocarisweat Stadium
Sunday 19:30	Tsuda 20' (yellow card) 59'; Miyazaki 31'; Eto 72'	Report		Attendance: 7,526; Referee: (Japan) Toshimitsu Yoshida

24 June 2012 21	Ehime FC	3–1	Tokyo Verdy	Ningineer Stadium
Sunday 20:00	Oyama 37'; Alair 51'; Urata (yellow card) 65'; Azuma 80'	Report	Fukatsu (yellow card) 18' (yellow-red card) 76'; Abe 32'	Attendance: 3,653; Referee: (Japan) Taku Nagaya

1 July 2012 22	Avispa Fukuoka	1–0	Ehime FC	Level-5 Stadium
Sunday 19:00	Jogo 26'; Suzuki (yellow card) 30'; Koga (yellow card) 82'	Report	Tamori (yellow card) 68'; Ishii (yellow card) 85'	Attendance: 3,487; Referee: (Paraguay) Antonio Arias

8 July 2012 23	Giravanz Kitakyushu	2–0	Ehime FC	Honjō Athletic Stadium
Sunday 19:00	Hanato 15' (pen.) (yellow card) 41'; Killoran (yellow card) 27' (goal) 51'	Report	Alair (yellow card) 11'; Akimoto (yellow card) 15'; Tomić (yellow card) 19' (yellow-red card) 25'	Attendance: 2,389; Referee: (Japan) Hiroyuki Onishi

15 July 2012 24	Ehime FC	1–1	Mito HollyHock	Ningineer Stadium
Sunday 20:00	Tamori (yellow card) 15'; Uchida (yellow card) 32'; Ishii 83'; Alair (yellow card) 90+5'	Report	Okamoto 90+4'; Suzuki (yellow card) 90+5'	Attendance: 3,180; Referee: (Japan) Yuki Noda

22 July 2012 25	Kyoto Sanga	2–1	Ehime FC	Nishikyogoku Athletic Stadium
Sunday 20:00	Nakayama 41'; Akimoto 90+4'	Report	Ishii 53'

29 July 2012 26	Ehime FC	1–2	Oita Trinita	Ningineer Stadium
Sunday 19:00	Uchida (yellow card) 29'; Arita (yellow card) 57'; Oyama 68'	Report	Mitsuhira 25', 85'; Morishima (yellow card) 57'; Shimizu (yellow card) 90+1'	Attendance: 3,502; Referee: (Japan) Kazuyuki Hayakawa

5 August 2012 27	Matsumoto Yamaga	1–1	Ehime FC	Matsumotodaira Football Stadium
Sunday 19:00	Tamabayashi (yellow card) 24'; Funayama (yellow card) 75'; Ken Hisatomi 80'; Iio (yellow card) 90+6'	Report	Uchida 34'; Fukuda (yellow card) 45+1'; Akimoto (yellow card) 45+3'	Attendance: 10,642; Referee: (Japan) Kenji Ogiya

12 August 2012 28	Ehime FC	1–2	Tokushima Vortis	Ningineer Stadium
Sunday 20:00	Arita 67' (pen.)	Report	Tsuda 40'; Hamada (yellow card) 65'; Hashiuchi 72'; Uesato (yellow card) 88'	Attendance: 6,612; Referee: (Japan) Akihiko Ikeuchi

19 August 2012 29	Ehime FC	1–2	Montedio Yamagata	Ningineer Stadium
Sunday 20:00	Arita 37'; Akai (yellow card) 45+3'	Summary	Nishikawa (yellow card) 42'; Nagata (yellow card) 58'; Branquinho 66', 79'; Hirose (yellow card) 90+1'	Attendance: 3,457; Referee: (Japan) Hiroyuki Onishi

22 August 2012 30	Tochigi S.C.	1–0	Ehime FC	Tochigi Green Stadium
Wednesday 20:00	Hirose 50'; Usami (yellow card) 74'	Summary	Uchida (yellow card) 31' (yellow-red card) 65'	Attendance: 2,820; Referee: (Japan) Yosuke Kubota

26 August 2012 31	Ehime FC	0–0	F.C. Gifu	Ningineer Stadium
Sunday 19:00	Tamori (yellow card) 35'	Summary	Someya (yellow card) 45+1'	Attendance: 3,109; Referee: (Japan) Kazuyuki Hayakawa

2 September 2012 32	Kataller Toyama	1–0	Ehime FC	Toyama Athletic Stadium
Sunday 19:00	Hiraide (yellow card) 13'; Onishi (yellow card) 51'; Kokeguchi 80'	Summary	Sekine (yellow card) 67'; Kuba (yellow card) 72'	Attendance: 3,543; Referee: (Japan) Kenji Ogiya

14 September 2012 33	Ehime FC	0–1	Yokohama	Ningineer Stadium
20:00	Azuma (yellow card) 47'; Uchida (yellow card) 59'; Watanabe (yellow card) 82'; Sonoda (yellow card) 90+6'	Summary	Tetsuya Okubo 65'	Attendance: 3,015; Referee: (Japan) Yoshiro Imamura

17 September 2012 34	Tokyo Verdy	3–0	Ehime FC	Ajinomoto Stadium
Monday 16:00	Abe 26' (pen.); Nishi 38'; Tsuchiya (yellow card) 42'; Alex Henrique 69'	Summary	Alair (yellow card) 24'; Akimoto (yellow card) 31'	Attendance: 3,893; Referee: (Japan) Koji Morikawa

23 September 2012 35	Ehime FC	1–0	Fagiano Okayama	Ningineer Stadium
Sunday 20:00	Watanabe (yellow card) 10'; Ishii 40'; Akai (yellow card) 70'	Summary		Attendance: 3,769; Referee: (Japan) Hiroyuki Onishi

30 September 2012 36	Ehime FC	2–2	JEF United Ichihara Chiba	Ningineer Stadium
Sunday 17:00	Arita 64', 90+5'; Alair (yellow card) 72'	Summary	Arata 11' (yellow card) 37'; Takeda (yellow card) 34'; Hyodo 69'; Tanaka (yellow card) 90+3'	Attendance: 2,792; Referee: (Japan) Tomohiro Inoue

7 October 2012 37	Shonan Bellmare	0–0	Ehime FC	Shonan BMW Stadium Hiratsuka
Sunday 17:00	Kikuchi (yellow card) 57'; Han Kook-Young (yellow card) 58'	Summary	Ishii (yellow card) 71'	Attendance: 5,938; Referee: (Japan) Yuki Noda

14 October 2012 38	Ehime FC	0–0	Gainare Tottori	Ningineer Stadium
Sunday 20:00	Tomić (yellow card) 18'; Urata (yellow card) 73'	Summary	Koide (yellow card) 49'; Sumida (yellow card) 78'; Nagira (yellow card) 85'; Miura (yellow card) 88'	Attendance: 3,865; Referee: (Japan) Ryuji Sato

21 October 2012 39	Machida Zelvia	2–4	Ehime FC	Machida Athletic Stadium
Sunday 17:00	Ota 18', 75'; Hiramoto (yellow card) 86' (yellow-red card) 90+1'	Summary	Kato 4', 59'; Arita 13'; Ishii (yellow card) 74'; Shun Ito 85'	Attendance: 2,883; Referee: (Japan) Takuto Okabe

28 October 2012 40	Ehime FC	0–0	Ventforet Kofu	Ningineer Stadium
Sunday 19:00	Arita (yellow card) 19'; Maeno (yellow card) 38'; Urata (yellow card) 55'; Takumi Murakami (yellow card) 59'; Watanabe (yellow card) 60'; Ishii (yellow card) 77'	Summary		Attendance: 3,380; Referee: (Japan) Kazuyuki Hayakawa

4 November 2012 41	Ehime FC	3–1	Thespa Kusatsu	Ningineer Stadium
Sunday 16:00	Maeno 40'; Sekine (yellow card) 52'; Arita 56'; Ishii 75' (yellow card) 76'	Summary	Hayashi 49'; Kim Seng-Yong (yellow card) 66'; Matsushita (yellow card) 82'	Attendance: 6,491; Referee: (Japan) Haruki Hidaka

11 November 2012 42	Roasso Kumamoto	0–1	Ehime FC	Kumamoto Athletics Stadium
Sunday 13:00	Osako (yellow card) 21'; Saito (yellow card) 64'; Nakama (yellow card) 75'; Taketomi (yellow card) 83'	Summary	Kato (yellow card) 80'; Naoya Fuji 90'	Attendance: 9,688; Referee: (Japan) Koji Morikawa

=== Emperor's Cup ===
8 September 2012 Second round	Shonan Bellmare	1–0	Ehime FC	Hiratsuka, Kanagawa
13:00	Syuhei Otsuki 48'	Report		Stadium: Shonan BMW Stadium Hiratsuka; Attendance: 1,478; Referee: Masuya Ueda
