= 2012 FC Gifu season =

FC Gifu
2012 season
- Manager: Takahiro Kimura
- J.League Division 2: 21st
- Emperor's Cup: Second round
Home colours	Away colours

The 2012 FC Gifu season sees FC Gifu compete in J.League Division 2 for the fifth consecutive season. FC Gifu are also competing in the 2012 Emperor's Cup.

== Competitions ==
=== J. League ===
==== League table ====
Pos	Team	Pld	W	D	L	GF	GA	GD	Pts	Promotion or relegation
18	Avispa Fukuoka	42	9	14	19	53	68	−15	41	
19	Kataller Toyama	42	9	11	22	38	59	−21	38	
20	Gainare Tottori	42	11	5	26	33	78	−45	38	
21	FC Gifu	42	7	14	21	27	55	−28	35	
22	Machida Zelvia (R)	42	7	11	24	34	67	−33	32	Relegation to 2013 Japan Football League (Note: The promotion and relegation between J2 and JFL will take place only if more than one promotion-eligible (i.e. having a J.League Associate Membership) JFL team finished above second place and playoff will be played only if a eligible JFL team finished in second place (See the corresponding section for further details). As only 2012 Japan Football League Champion V-Varen Nagasaki has the Associate Membership among the top 2 teams. Machida Zelvia was relegated immediately but no relegation/playoff was taken place for FC Gifu which finished 21st.)

Updated to match(es) played on 11 November 2012. Source: J.League Division 2
Rules for classification: 1st points; 2nd goal differential; 3rd goals scored; 4th head-to-head results; 5th disciplinary points; 6th draw. If two clubs are tied for first place, both clubs will be declared champions.
(R) Relegated

==== Matches ====
4 March 2012 1	FC Gifu	2 - 2	Gainare Tottori	Gifu Nagaragawa Stadium
Sunday 15:04	Satō 20'; Someya 45'	Report	9' Nagira; 61' Own-goal	Attendance: 3,321; Referee: Sato

11 March 2012 2	Tokushima Vortis	3 - 0	FC Gifu	Pocarisweat Stadium
Sunday 13:06	Kim 10'; Tsuda 32'; Elizeu 46'	Report		Attendance: 6,016; Referee: Okabe

17 March 2012 3	FC Gifu	0 - 0	Thespa Kusatsu	Gifu Nagaragawa Stadium
Saturday 16:04		Report		Attendance: 1,836; Referee: Yamauchi

20 March 2012 4	Shonan Bellmare	2 - 1	FC Gifu	Shonan BMW Stadium Hiratsuka
Tuesday 16:04	Baba 13'; Ono 75'	Report	90+3' Higuchi	Attendance: 6,065; Referee: Onishi

25 March 2012 5	FC Gifu	0 - 2	Oita Trinita	Gifu Nagaragawa Stadium
Sunday 18:04		Report	68', 84' Sakata	Attendance: 2,539; Referee: Oka

1 April 2012 6	Roasso Kumamoto	3 - 0	FC Gifu	Kumamoto Athletics Stadium
13:00	Choi Kun-Sik 33' (yellow card) 45+4'; Junki Goryo 47', 54'; Yabu (yellow card) 54'	Report		Attendance: 3,930; Referee: Naohito Ogawa

8 April 2012 7	FC Gifu	0 - 1	Kyoto Sanga	Gifu Nagaragawa Stadium
16:00	Jinushizono (yellow card) 17'	Summary	Mizutani (yellow card) 27'; Someya (yellow card) 46'; Miyayoshi (yellow card) 62'; Hara 90+1'	Attendance: 3,408; Referee: Ryoichi Imamura

15 April 2012 8	FC Gifu	1 - 0	Giravanz Kitakyushu	Gifu Nagaragawa Stadium
16:00	Ryuji Hirota 55'; Kim Jung-Hyun (yellow card) 90+2'	Summary	Arai (yellow card) 39'; Kimura (yellow card) 70'; Miyamoto (yellow card) 77'	Attendance: 2,920; Referee: Kazuyucki Hayakawa

22 April 2012 9	Tochigi S.C.	1 - 1	FC Gifu	Tochigi Green Stadium
13:00	Paulinho (yellow card) 51' (yellow-red card) 90+1'; Sabia 68'	Report	Ryuji Hirota (yellow card) 35'; Inoue 44' (yellow card) 80'; Ri Han-Jae (yellow card) 66'	Attendance: 2,607; Referee: Eiji Kawai

27 April 2012 10	FC Gifu	0 - 2	Yokohama F.C.	Gifu Nagaragawa Stadium
19:00		Report	Tahara 33', 65' (yellow card) 86'	Attendance: 3,540; Referee: Koei Koya

30 April 2012 11	Kataller Toyama	1 - 0	FC Gifu	Toyama Athletic Stadium
16:00	Kokeguchi 68'; Yoshii (yellow card) 70'	Report	Noda (yellow card) 53'	Attendance: 3,466; Referee: Takuto Okabe

3 May 2012 12	FC Gifu	0 - 1	Mito HollyHock	Gifu Nagaragawa Stadium
19:00 (UTC+09)	Kōichi Satō (yellow card) 42'; Ri Han-Jae (yellow card) 73'	Report	Romero Berrocal Frank 16'; Omoto (yellow card) 86'	Attendance: 5,232; Referee: Hiroshi Yamauchi

6 May 2012 13	Fagiano Okayama	0 - 1	FC Gifu	Kanko Stadium
16:00 (UTC+09)	Takeda (yellow card) 65'	Report	Kohei Nakajima (yellow card) 57'; Nogaito (yellow card) 68'; Hiroki Higuchi 86'	Attendance: 9,534; Referee: Akihiko Ikeuchi

13 May 2012 14	FC Gifu	0 - 1	Matsumoto Yamaga F.C.	Gifu Nagaragawa Stadium
19:00 (UTC+09)	Kohei Nakajima (yellow card) 76'	Report	Tsurumaki 40'; Watanabe (yellow card) 69'	Attendance: 5,088; Referee: Yosuke Kubota

20 May 2012 15	Montedio Yamagata	2 - 1	FC Gifu	ND Soft Stadium Yamagata
13:00 (UTC+09)	Ishii (yellow card) 39'; Bandai (yellow card) 41' (goal) 56'; Yamazaki 66' (pen.)	Report	Kōichi Satō 41' (pen.); Nogaito (yellow card) 64'	Attendance: 8,070; Referee: Eiji Kawai

27 May 2012 16	FC Gifu	0 - 3	Ventforet Kofu	Gifu Nagaragawa Stadium
19:00 (UTC+09)	Someya (yellow card) 38'; Nogaito (yellow card) 48'	Report	Takasaki 2'; Davi (yellow card) 55' (goal) 59'; Matsuhashi (yellow card) 66'; Fukuda 76'	Attendance: 6,151; Referee: Haruki Hidaka

2 June 2012 17	JEF United Ichihara Chiba	0 - 1	FC Gifu	Fukuda Denshi Arena
16:00 (UTC+09)	Ito (yellow card) 64'; Yonekura (yellow card) 68'	Report	Kōichi Satō 35'	Attendance: 10,377; Referee: (Japan) Masuya Ueda

9 June 2012 18	FC Gifu	1 - 1	Ehime F.C.	Gifu Nagaragawa Stadium
19:00 (UTC+09)	Noda (yellow card) 16'; Inoue 69'	Report	Akai 18' (pen.) (yellow card) 29'; Alair (yellow card) 52'; Arita (yellow card) 70'; Sonoda (yellow card) 75'; Azuma (yellow card) 79'	Attendance: 3,205; Referee: (Japan) Tomohiro Inoue

13 June 2012 19	Tokyo Verdy	4 - 1	FC Gifu	Ajinomoto Stadium
19:00 (UTC+09)	Nishi 4'; Kobayashi 75' (pen.); Takahashi 82'; Abe 87'	Report	Hiroki Higuchi 12'; Nogaito (yellow card) 85'; Kohei Nakajima (yellow card) 90'	Attendance: 3,187; Referee: (Japan) Akihiko Ikeuchi

17 June 2012 20	Avispa Fukuoka	0 - 0	FC Gifu	Level-5 Stadium
18:00 (UTC+09)	Tsutsumi (yellow card) 51'; Koga (yellow card) 63'	Report	Kohei Nakajima (yellow card) 90+2'	Attendance: 3,509; Referee: (Japan) Yosuke Kubota

24 June 2012 21	FC Gifu	1 - 0	F.C. Machida Zelvia	Gifu Nagaragawa Stadium
18:00 (UTC+09)	Kōichi Satō 54'	Report	Shoji (yellow card) 2'; Kitai (yellow card) 47'; Kohei Kato (yellow card) 71'	Attendance: 3,670; Referee: (Japan) Hiromichi Oka

1 July 2012 22	Ventforet Kofu	0 - 0	FC Gifu	Yamanashi Chuo Bank Stadium
18:00 (UTC+09)	Choi Sung-Kuen (yellow card) 19'; Renato Luís de Sá Filho (yellow card) 90+1'	Report	Hashimoto (yellow card) 70'; Ri Han-Jae (yellow card) 84'	Attendance: 7,630; Referee: (Japan) Yuki Noda

8 July 2012 23	FC Gifu	0 - 2	Roasso Kumamoto	Gifu Nagaragawa Stadium
19:00 (UTC+09)	Hiroshi Sekita (yellow card) 21'; Hiroki Higuchi (yellow card) 40'	Report	Osako 26'; Taketomi 37'; Tsuyuki (yellow card) 90+3'	Attendance: 4,023; Referee: (Japan) Kazuyuki Hayakawa

15 July 2012 24	FC Gifu	2 - 2	Kataller Toyama	Gifu Nagaragawa Stadium
19:00 (UTC+09)	Kōichi Satō 45' (yellow card) 51'; Nogaito (yellow card) 61'; Hiroki Higuchi 63'; Mita (yellow card) 65'	Report	Kimura 9'; Seo Yong-Duk 48'	Attendance: 6,313; Referee: (Japan) Naohito Ogawa

22 July 2012 25	Oita Trinita	2 - 2	FC Gifu	Ōita Bank Dome
19:00 (UTC+09)	Murai 25' (pen.); Tameda (yellow card) 27'; Tokita (yellow card) 28'; Mitsuhira 82'	Report	Abuda 58'; Hattori 75'	Attendance: 8,871; Referee: (Japan) Haruki Hidaka

29 July 2012 26	Gainare Tottori	1 - 0	FC Gifu	Tottori Bank Bird Stadium
19:00 (UTC+09)	Fujimoto (yellow card) 8'; Mori 68'; Miura (yellow card) 69'	Report	Hirota (yellow card) 43'; Inoue (yellow card) 45+2'	Attendance: 5,125; Referee: (Japan) Shoichiro Mikami

5 August 2012 27	FC Gifu	0 - 3	Avispa Fukuoka	Gifu Nagaragawa Stadium
18:00 (UTC+09)	Someya (yellow card) 71'	Report	Nishida 28', 84'; Koga (yellow card) 56'; Suzuki 76'	Attendance: 8,492; Referee: (Japan) Itaru Hirose

12 August 2012 28	Thespa Kusatsu	1 - 1	FC Gifu	Shoda Shoyu Stadium Gunma
20:00 (UTC+09)	Satoru Hoshino (yellow card) 37'; Alex Rafael (yellow card) 90' (goal) 90+2'	Report	Jinushizono 78'; Someya (yellow card) 90'	Attendance: 2,272; Referee: (Japan) Tomohiro Tsukada

19 August 2012 29	FC Gifu	1 - 2	Fagiano Okayama	Gifu Nagaragawa Stadium
20:00 (UTC+09)	Ri Han-Jae (yellow card) 27'; Jinushizono 62'; Murakami (yellow card) 67'	Report	Kawamata 45+2', 71'; Tadokoro (yellow card) 60'; Goto (yellow card) 75'	Attendance: 2,434; Referee: (Japan) Kazuyoshi Enomoto

22 August 2012 30	FC Gifu	0 - 0	JEF United Ichihara Chiba	Gifu Nagaragawa Stadium
19:00 (UTC+09)	Nogaito (yellow card) 65'	Report	Sato (yellow card) 18'	Attendance: 3,932; Referee: (Japan) Hiroshi Yamauchi

26 August 2012 31	Ehime F.C.	0 - 0	FC Gifu	Ningineer Stadium
19:00 (UTC+09)	Tamori (yellow card) 35'	Summary	Someya (yellow card) 45+1'	Attendance: 3,109; Referee: (Japan) Kazuyuki Hayakawa

2 September 2012 32	FC Gifu	1 - 0	Tokyo Verdy	Gifu Nagaragawa Stadium
20:00 (UTC+09)	Danilo Pereira (yellow card) 55' (goal) 67'; Tanaka (yellow card) 62'	Summary		Attendance: 4,849; Referee: (Japan) Yuki Noda

14 September 2012 33	Giravanz Kitakyushu	2 - 1	FC Gifu	Honjō Athletic Stadium
20:00	Ikemoto 6'; Hanato 63'; Yasuda (yellow card) 74'; Arai (yellow card) 90+3'	Summary	Ri Han-Jae (yellow card) 44'; Abuda (yellow card) 76'; Hiroki Higuchi 78'	Attendance: 2,853; Referee: (Japan) Hiromichi Oka

17 September 2012 34	FC Gifu	1 - 0	Tochigi S.C.	Gifu Nagaragawa Stadium
20:00	Hiromichi Higuchi (yellow card) 20'; Danilo Pereira (yellow card) 43'; Hiroshi Sekita 84'	Summary	Toma (yellow card) 8'; Sugimoto (yellow card) 87'	Attendance: 1,791; Referee: (Japan) Yosuke Kubota

23 September 2012 35	FC Gifu	3 - 2	Shonan Bellmare	Gifu Nagaragawa Stadium
20:00	Kōichi Satō 18' (pen.), 54', 59'; Ri Han-Jae (yellow card) 41'; Someya (yellow card) 43'; Abuda (yellow card) 63'	Summary	Wataru Endo (red card) 16'; Syuhei Otsuki (yellow card) 23'; Kikuchi 53', 69'; Ono (yellow card) 82'; Shimamura (yellow card) 84'	Attendance: 3,016; Referee: (Japan) Kazuyuki Hayakawa

7 October 2012 37	Mito HollyHock	1 - 1	FC Gifu	K's denki Stadium Mito
20:00	Frank 6'; Kim Yong-Gi (yellow card) 24'; Suzuki (yellow card) 45'	Summary	Kōichi Satō (yellow card) 36'; Ri Han-Jae 42'	Attendance: 3,403; Referee: (Japan) Hiroyuki Onishi

14 October 2012 38	FC Gifu	0 - 0	Montedio Yamagata	Gifu Nagaragawa Stadium
20:00	Hiroki Higuchi (yellow card) 90'; Hattori (yellow card) 90+4'	Summary	Ryohei Hayashi (yellow card) 76'	Attendance: 2,797; Referee: (Japan) Hajime Matsuo

18 October 2012 36	Matsumoto Yamaga F.C.	1 - 0	FC Gifu	Matsumotodaira Football Stadium
20:00	Tetsuto (yellow card) 79'; Allisson Ricardo 87'	Summary		Attendance: 6,061; Referee: (Japan) Kenta Tsukada

21 October 2012 39	Kyoto Sanga F.C.	3 - 1	FC Gifu	Nishikyogoku Athletic Stadium
14:00	Komai 15', 28'; Ando 41'	Summary	Hattori (yellow card) 30'; Hiroki Higuchi 48'; Nogaito (yellow card) 63'	Attendance: 10,275; Referee: (Japan) Ryuji Sato

28 October 2012 40	F.C. Machida Zelvia	1 - 0	FC Gifu	Machida Athletic Stadium
15:00	Dimić (yellow card) 10' (goal) 46'; Kohei Shimoda (yellow card) 26'; Miki (yellow card) 43' (yellow-red card) 76'; Shuto Kono (yellow card) 64'; Tomohito Shugyo (yellow card) 87'	Summary	Kōichi Satō (yellow card) 33'; Hiroki Higuchi (yellow card) 55'; Hattori (yellow card) 90+2'	Attendance: 2,618; Referee: (Japan) Kenji Ogiya

4 November 2012 41	FC Gifu	0 - 0	Tokushima Vortis	Gifu Nagaragawa Stadium
15:00	Nogaito (yellow card) 45'	Summary	Suzuki (yellow card) 31'; Diogo (yellow card) 65'; Hamada (yellow card) 72'	Attendance: 11,119; Referee: (Japan) Hiromichi Oka

11 November 2012 42	Yokohama F.C.	3 - 2	FC Gifu	Nippatsu Mitsuzawa Stadium
13:00	Terada (yellow card) 21'; Kaio 43'; Morimoto 64'; K. Sato (yellow card) 68'; Nagai 84'	Summary	K. Satō 18' 82'; Someya (yellow card) 55'; Inoue (yellow card) 73'	Attendance: 8,034; Referee: (Japan) Yuki Noda

=== Emperor's Cup ===
8 September 2012 Round 2	Roasso Kumamoto	4 – 3 (a.e.t.)	FC Gifu	Kumamoto
13:00	Taketomi 11', 93'; Nakama 74'; Osako 112'	Report	Higuchi 48', 64'; Danilo 95'	Stadium: Kumamoto Athletics Stadium; Attendance: 1,823; Referee: Haruki Hidaka
