= 2007 Ventforet Kofu season =

Ventforet Kofu
2007 season
- Manager: Takeshi Oki
- Stadium: Kose Sports Park Stadium
- J. League 1: 17th
- Emperor's Cup: 5th Round
- J. League Cup: Quarterfinals
- Top goalscorer: Takehito Shigehara (6)

2007 Ventforet Kofu season

== Competitions ==
Competitions	Position
J. League 1	17th / 18 clubs
Emperor's Cup	5th Round
J. League Cup	Quarterfinals

== Domestic results ==
=== J. League 1 ===
Match	Date	Venue	Opponents	Score
1	2007..			-
2	2007..			-
3	2007..			-
4	2007..			-
5	2007..			-
6	2007..			-
7	2007..			-
8	2007..			-
9	2007..			-
10	2007..			-
11	2007..			-
12	2007..			-
13	2007..			-
14	2007..			-
15	2007..			-
16	2007..			-
17	2007..			-
18	2007..			-
19	2007..			-
20	2007..			-
21	2007..			-
22	2007..			-
23	2007..			-
24	2007..			-
25	2007..			-
26	2007..			-
27	2007..			-
28	2007..			-
29	2007..			-
30	2007..			-
31	2007..			-
32	2007..			-
33	2007..			-
34	2007..			-

=== Emperor's Cup ===
Match	Date	Venue	Opponents	Score
4th Round	2007..			-
5th Round	2007..			-

=== J. League Cup ===
Match	Date	Venue	Opponents	Score
GL-D-1	2007..			-
GL-D-2	2007..			-
GL-D-3	2007..			-
GL-D-4	2007..			-
GL-D-5	2007..			-
GL-D-6	2007..			-
Quarterfinals-1	2007..			-
Quarterfinals-2	2007..			-

== Player statistics ==
No.	Pos.	Player	D.o.B. (Age)	Height / Weight	J. League 1		Emperor's Cup		J. League Cup		Total	
No.	Pos.	Player	D.o.B. (Age)	Height / Weight	Apps	Goals	Apps	Goals	Apps	Goals	Apps	Goals
1	GK	Kensaku Abe	May 13, 1980 (aged 26)	cm / kg	19	0						
2	DF	Michitaka Akimoto	September 24, 1982 (aged 24)	cm / kg	27	3						
3	DF	Takuma Tsuda	October 4, 1980 (aged 26)	cm / kg	6	0						
4	DF	Hideomi Yamamoto	June 26, 1980 (aged 26)	cm / kg	29	0						
5	DF	Yuki Inoue	October 31, 1977 (aged 29)	cm / kg	25	0						
6	MF	Shinya Nasu	December 29, 1978 (aged 28)	cm / kg	0	0						
7	MF	Katsuya Ishihara	October 2, 1978 (aged 28)	cm / kg	34	5						
8	MF	Takehito Shigehara	October 6, 1981 (aged 25)	cm / kg	26	6						
9	FW	Daisuke Sudo	April 25, 1977 (aged 29)	cm / kg	23	4						
10	MF	Ken Fujita	August 27, 1979 (aged 27)	cm / kg	32	2						
11	FW	Jun Uruno	October 23, 1979 (aged 27)	cm / kg	22	0						
13	MF	Daiki Tamori	August 5, 1983 (aged 23)	cm / kg	9	0						
14	FW	Dženan Radončić	August 2, 1983 (aged 23)	cm / kg	9	1						
15	DF	Tatsuya Masushima	April 22, 1985 (aged 21)	cm / kg	25	4						
16	FW	Alberto	April 27, 1975 (aged 31)	cm / kg	15	3						
17	MF	Tomoyoshi Tsurumi	October 12, 1979 (aged 27)	cm / kg	2	0						
18	FW	Taro Hasegawa	August 17, 1979 (aged 27)	cm / kg	2	0						
18	FW	Toshiaki Haji	August 28, 1978 (aged 28)	cm / kg	6	0						
19	DF	Yosuke Ikehata	June 7, 1979 (aged 27)	cm / kg	19	0						
20	DF	Kentaro Suzuki	June 2, 1980 (aged 26)	cm / kg	2	0						
21	GK	Tatsuya Tsuruta	September 9, 1982 (aged 24)	cm / kg	16	0						
22	GK	Shigeru Sakurai	June 29, 1979 (aged 27)	cm / kg	1	0						
23	FW	Kotaro Yamazaki	October 19, 1978 (aged 28)	cm / kg	14	0						
24	FW	Yohei Onishi	October 30, 1982 (aged 24)	cm / kg	18	0						
25	MF	Kenta Suzuki	September 16, 1985 (aged 21)	cm / kg	15	0						
26	MF	Kazunari Hosaka	March 24, 1983 (aged 23)	cm / kg	6	3						
27	DF	Takafumi Mikuriya	May 11, 1984 (aged 22)	cm / kg	0	0						
28	FW	Shota Kimura	October 17, 1988 (aged 18)	cm / kg	7	0						
29	FW	Eisei Tomioka	July 1, 1984 (aged 22)	cm / kg	0	0						
30	GK	Shogo Tokihisa	April 15, 1984 (aged 22)	cm / kg	0	0						
31	MF	Kentaro Hayashi	August 29, 1972 (aged 34)	cm / kg	24	1						
32	DF	Arata Sugiyama	July 25, 1980 (aged 26)	cm / kg	23	0						
33	FW	Junya Kuno	August 16, 1988 (aged 18)	cm / kg	6	1						
34	FW	Josimar	August 16, 1987 (aged 19)	cm / kg	2	0						
35	DF	Tsubasa Oshima	December 9, 1983 (aged 23)	cm / kg	0	0						
36	DF	Ken Yorii	April 26, 1984 (aged 22)	cm / kg	0	0						
37	MF	Takahiro Kuniyoshi	May 28, 1988 (aged 18)	cm / kg	1	0						
38	MF	Daisuke Kanzaki	February 2, 1985 (aged 22)	cm / kg	0	0						

== Other pages ==
- (in Japanese) J. League official site
