= Toshitaka =

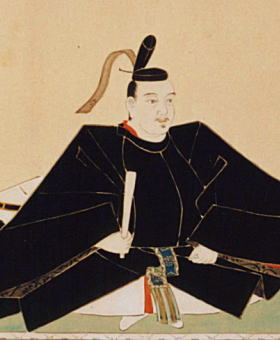
- Toshitaka Ikeda (1584–1616), Japanese feudal lord. Portrait at Hayashibara Museum.
- Pronunciation: toɕitaka (IPA)
- Gender: Male

Origin
- Origin: Japanese
- Meaning: Different meanings depending on the kanji used

Other names
- Alternative spelling: Tositaka (Kunrei-shiki) Tositaka (Nihon-shiki) Toshitaka (Hepburn)

Toshitaka is a masculine Japanese given name.

== Written forms ==
Toshitaka can be written using different combinations of kanji characters. Examples:

- 敏隆, "agile, noble"
- 敏孝, "agile, filial piety"
- 敏貴, "agile, precious"
- 敏高, "agile, tall"
- 俊隆, "talented, noble"
- 俊孝, "talented, filial piety"
- 俊貴, "talented, precious"
- 寿隆, "long life, noble"
- 寿孝, "long life, filial piety"
- 寿貴, "long life, precious"
- 寿喬, "long life, high"
- 利隆, "benefit, noble"
- 利孝, "benefit, filial piety"
- 年隆, "year, noble"
- 年貴, "year, precious"

The name can also be written in hiragana としたか or katakana トシタカ.

== Notable people with the name ==
- Toshitaka Ikeda (池田 利隆, 1584–1616), Japanese daimyō.
- Toshitaka Kimura (木村 敏隆, born 1963), Japanese rugby union player.
- Toshitaka Kajino (梶野 敏貴, born 1956), Japanese astronomer.
- Toshitaka Maeda (前田 利孝, 1594–1637), Japanese daimyō.
- Toshitaka Nanbu (南部 利敬, 1782–1820), Japanese daimyō.
- Toshitaka Shimizu (清水 敏孝, 1968–2003), Japanese voice actor.
- Toshitaka Tsurumi (鶴見 聡貴, born 1986), Japanese footballer.
