= 2006 Ventforet Kofu season =

Ventforet Kofu
2006 season
- Manager: Takeshi Oki
- Stadium: Kose Sports Park Stadium
- J. League 1: 15th
- Emperor's Cup: Quarterfinals
- J. League Cup: GL-D 3rd
- Top goalscorer: Baré (14)

During the 2006 season, Ventforet Kofu competed in the J. League Division 1, the top tier of Japanese football, in which they finished 15th.

== Competitions ==
Competitions	Position
J. League 1	15th / 18 clubs
Emperor's Cup	Quarterfinals
J. League Cup	GL-D 3rd / 5 clubs

=== J. League 1 ===
==== League table ====
Pos	Team	Pld	W	D	L	GF	GA	GD	Pts	Qualification or relegation
13	FC Tokyo	34	13	4	17	56	65	−9	43	
14	Albirex Niigata	34	12	6	16	46	65	−19	42	
15	Ventforet Kofu	34	12	6	16	42	64	−22	42	
16	Avispa Fukuoka (R)	34	5	12	17	32	56	−24	27	2006 promotion/relegation Series
17	Cerezo Osaka (R)	34	6	9	19	44	70	−26	27	Relegation to 2007 J.League Division 2

Updated to match(es) played on December 2, 2006. Source: J. League Division 1
Rules for classification: 1) points; 2) goal difference; 3) number of goals scored.
(R) Relegated

==== Results ====
J.League Division 1 results
Date	Opponent	Venue	Result F–A
5 March 2006	Shimizu S-Pulse	H	0–2
11 March 2006	JEF United Chiba	A	2–2
18 March 2006	Kawasaki Frontale	H	1–0
21 March 2006	Kashima Antlers	A	1–3
25 March 2006	Avispa Fukuoka	H	1–1
1 April 2006	Cerezo Osaka	A	3–2
8 April 2006	Albirex Niigata	H	0–4
15 April 2006	Oita Trinita	A	2–3
23 April 2006	Yokohama F. Marinos	H	1–0
30 April 2006	Júbilo Iwata	A	0–2
3 May 2006	FC Tokyo	H	1–3
6 May 2006	Gamba Osaka	A	0–2
19 July 2006	Kyoto Purple Sanga	H	3–1
22 July 2006	Omiya Ardija	A	1–3
26 July 2006	Sanfrecce Hiroshima	A	3–1
29 July 2006	Urawa Red Diamonds	H	1–1
12 August 2006	Nagoya Grampus Eight	A	1–5
19 August 2006	Shimizu S-Pulse	A	0–4
23 August 2006	Kashima Antlers	H	2–1
26 August 2006	Júbilo Iwata	H	1–1
30 August 2006	Yokohama F. Marinos	A	0–3
9 September 2006	FC Tokyo	A	3–1
17 September 2006	Omiya Ardija	H	3–2
24 September 2006	Albirex Niigata	A	0–3
1 October 2006	Gamba Osaka	H	3–2
7 October 2006	Sanfrecce Hiroshima	H	1–0
14 October 2006	Kawasaki Frontale	A	0–2
21 October 2006	Nagoya Grampus Eight	H	2–1
28 October 2006	Cerezo Osaka	H	0–1
11 November 2006	Kyoto Purple Sanga	A	1–1
18 November 2006	Oita Trinita	H	2–0
23 November 2006	Urawa Red Diamonds	A	0–3
26 November 2006	JEF United Chiba	H	2–3
2 December 2006	Avispa Fukuoka	A	1–1

== Player statistics ==
No.	Pos.	Player	D.o.B. (Age)	Height / Weight	J. League 1		Emperor's Cup		J. League Cup		Total	
No.	Pos.	Player	D.o.B. (Age)	Height / Weight	Apps	Goals	Apps	Goals	Apps	Goals	Apps	Goals
1	GK	Kensaku Abe	13 May 1980 (aged 25)	cm / kg	30	0						
2	DF	Michitaka Akimoto	24 September 1982 (aged 23)	cm / kg	18	1						
3	DF	Takuma Tsuda	4 October 1980 (aged 25)	cm / kg	5	0						
4	DF	Hideomi Yamamoto	26 June 1980 (aged 25)	cm / kg	32	0						
5	DF	Yuki Inoue	31 October 1977 (aged 28)	cm / kg	11	0						
6	MF	Shinya Nasu	29 December 1978 (aged 27)	cm / kg	4	0						
7	MF	Katsuya Ishihara	2 October 1978 (aged 27)	cm / kg	33	2						
8	MF	Kazuki Kuranuki	10 November 1978 (aged 27)	cm / kg	10	3						
9	FW	Daisuke Sudo	25 April 1977 (aged 28)	cm / kg	15	1						
10	MF	Ken Fujita	27 August 1979 (aged 26)	cm / kg	26	2						
11	FW	Jun Uruno	23 October 1979 (aged 26)	cm / kg	20	4						
13	MF	Daiki Tamori	5 August 1983 (aged 22)	cm / kg	0	0						
14	FW	Gakuya Horii	3 July 1975 (aged 30)	cm / kg	16	1						
15	DF	Alair	27 January 1982 (aged 24)	cm / kg	23	0						
16	FW	Baré	18 January 1982 (aged 24)	cm / kg	30	14						
17	MF	Tomoyoshi Tsurumi	12 October 1979 (aged 26)	cm / kg	14	0						
18	FW	Taro Hasegawa	17 August 1979 (aged 26)	cm / kg	17	3						
19	DF	Yosuke Ikehata	7 June 1979 (aged 26)	cm / kg	3	0						
20	MF	Biju	17 September 1974 (aged 31)	cm / kg	26	1						
21	GK	Tatsuya Tsuruta	9 September 1982 (aged 23)	cm / kg	4	0						
22	GK	Daisuke Matsushita	31 October 1981 (aged 24)	cm / kg	0	0						
23	FW	Kotaro Yamazaki	19 October 1978 (aged 27)	cm / kg	18	2						
24	FW	Yohei Onishi	30 October 1982 (aged 23)	cm / kg	16	0						
25	MF	Kenta Suzuki	16 September 1985 (aged 20)	cm / kg	6	0						
26	MF	Kazunari Hosaka	24 March 1983 (aged 22)	cm / kg	8	1						
27	DF	Tsutomu Matsuda	5 October 1983 (aged 22)	cm / kg	2	0						
28	DF	Shingo Morita	9 December 1978 (aged 27)	cm / kg	0	0						
29	MF	Toshiki Chino	19 July 1985 (aged 20)	cm / kg	0	0						
29	FW	Hiroyuki Ishida	31 August 1979 (aged 26)	cm / kg	0	0						
30	GK	Yuya Satō	10 February 1986 (aged 20)	cm / kg	0	0						
30	MF	Neto	25 March 1987 (aged 18)	cm / kg	0	0						
31	MF	Kentaro Hayashi	29 August 1972 (aged 33)	cm / kg	30	0						
32	DF	Arata Sugiyama	25 July 1980 (aged 25)	cm / kg	30	0						
33	MF	Takehito Shigehara	6 October 1981 (aged 24)	cm / kg	20	5						
34	FW	Josimar	16 August 1987 (aged 18)	cm / kg	0	0						

== Other pages ==
- (in Japanese) J. League official site
