= Shuichi Akai =

Shuichi Akai may refer to:

- Shuichi Akai (footballer) (born 1981), Japanese footballer
- Shuichi Akai (Case Closed), a fictional character in Japanese manga series Case Closed
