= Katsunari =

- Gender: Male

Origin
- Origin: Japanese
- Meaning: Different meanings depending on the kanji used

Katsunari (written: 勝成) is a masculine Japanese given name. Notable people with the name include:

- Katsunari Mizumoto (水本 勝成; born 1990), Japanese footballer
- Katsunari Takahashi (高橋 勝成; born 1950), Japanese golfer
- Katsunari Takayama (高山 勝成; born 1983), Japanese boxer
