= Shun Nogaito =

Japanese footballer

Shun Nogaito 野垣内俊
Personal information
- Full name: Shun Nogaito
- Date of birth: September 11, 1986 (age 40)
- Place of birth: Yokkaichi, Mie, Japan
- Height: 1.75 m (5 ft 9 in)
- Position: Defender

Team information
- Current team: Veertien Mie
- Number: 17

Youth career
- 2002–2004: Tsu Kogyo High School

College career
Years	Team	Apps	(Gls)
2005–2008	Yokkaichi University		

Senior career*
Years	Team	Apps	(Gls)
2009–2016	FC Gifu	206	(3)
2017	Vanraure Hachinohe	25	(0)
2018–	Veertien Mie	54	(3)
- * Club domestic league appearances and goals as of 20 February 2020

Shun Nogaito (野垣内俊, Nogaito Shun; born September 11, 1986) is a Japanese football player who plays as a defender for Veertien Mie.

As a student at Mie Prefectural Tsu Technical High School, he served as the captain of his team during the 83rd All Japan High School Soccer Championship.

He enrolled at Yokkaichi University and, while still a student, was registered as a special designated player with FC Gifu in August 2008.

Enrolling as a student at Yokkaichi University he played with FC Gifu team in August 2008.

In 2009, he joined Koichi Sato from Yokkaichi University. In 2010, he became a vice-captain of the team.

In 2017, he joined Vanraure Hachinohe and the following year, in 2018, he joined Viatin Mie.

== Career statistics ==
Updated to 20 February 2020.

Appearances and goals by club, season and competition
Club	Season	League			Emperor's Cup		Total	
Club	Season	Division	Apps	Goals	Apps	Goals	Apps	Goals
FC Gifu	2009	J2 League	14	0	1	0	15	0
FC Gifu	2010	J2 League	24	2	0	0	24	2
FC Gifu	2011	J2 League	33	1	0	0	33	1
FC Gifu	2012	J2 League	34	0	1	0	34	0
FC Gifu	2013	J2 League	33	0	1	0	34	0
FC Gifu	2014	J2 League	17	0	1	0	18	0
FC Gifu	2015	J2 League	27	0	1	0	28	0
FC Gifu	2016	J2 League	24	0	1	0	25	0
Vanraure Hachinohe	2017	JFL	25	0	2	0	27	0
Veertien Mie	2018	JFL	28	3	–		28	3
Veertien Mie	2019	JFL	26	0	3	0	29	0
Veertien Mie	2020	JFL	0	0	0	0	0	0
Veertien Mie	2021	JFL	0	0	0	0	0	0
Veertien Mie	2022	JFL	0	0	0	0	0	0
Veertien Mie	2023	JFL	0	0	0	0	0	0
Veertien Mie	2024	JFL	0	0	0	0	0	0
Career total			285	6	9	0	294	6
