= Alair (footballer) =

Brazilian footballer (born 1982)

Personal information
- Full name: Alair de Souza Camargo Júnior
- Date of birth: 27 January 1982 (age 44)
- Place of birth: Umuarama, Paraná, Brazil
- Height: 1.84 m (6 ft 0 in)
- Position: Defender

Youth career
- 1998–2000: PSTC

Senior career*
Years	Team	Apps	(Gls)
2001–2002	Shimizu S-Pulse	0	(0)
2002–2006	Ventforet Kofu	129	(4)
2007	Veranópolis	10	(0)
2008	Chapecoense	14	(0)
2009–2010	Ehime FC	49	(4)
2011	Kyoto Sanga FC	7	(0)
2012–2013	Ehime FC	32	(3)
- * Club domestic league appearances and goals

Alair de Souza Camargo Júnior (born 27 January 1982), or simply Alair, is a Brazilian former professional footballer who played as a defender.

== Career statistics ==
Appearances and goals by club, season and competition
Club	Season	League			National cup (Note: Includes Emperor's Cup)		League cup (Note: Includes J.League Cup)		Total	
Club	Season	Division	Apps	Goals	Apps	Goals	Apps	Goals	Apps	Goals
Shimizu S-Pulse	2001	J1 League	0	0	0	0	0	0	0	0
Shimizu S-Pulse	2002	J1 League	0	0	0	0	0	0	0	0
Ventforet Kofu	2002	J2 League	21	0	3	0	–		24	0
Ventforet Kofu	2003	J2 League	35	2	0	0	–		35	2
Ventforet Kofu	2004	J2 League	31	1	1	0	–		32	1
Ventforet Kofu	2005	J2 League	19	1	2	0	–		21	1
Ventforet Kofu	2006	J1 League	23	0	1	0	3	0	27	0
Ehime FC	2009	J2 League	18	1	1	0	–		19	1
Ehime FC	2010	J2 League	31	3	1	0	–		32	3
Kyoto Sanga FC	2011	J2 League	7	0	0	0	–		7	0
Ehime FC	2012	J2 League	24	2	1	0	–		25	2
Ehime FC	2013	J2 League	8	1	1	0	–		9	1
Career total			217	11	11	0	3	0	231	11
