= Kentaro Suzuki =

Japanese footballer

Kentaro Suzuki 鈴木 健太郎
Personal information
- Date of birth: June 2, 1980 (age 46)
- Place of birth: Shibetsu, Hokkaido, Japan
- Height: 1.77 m (5 ft 9 1/2 in)
- Position: Defender

Youth career
- 1996–1998: Asahikawa Jitsugyo High School

Senior career*
Years	Team	Apps	(Gls)
1999–2000	Shonan Bellmare	1	(0)
2001–2002	Montedio Yamagata	77	(1)
2003	Tokyo Verdy	6	(0)
2003–2006	Albirex Niigata	32	(1)
2007	Ventforet Kofu	2	(0)
Total		118	(2)
- * Club domestic league appearances and goals

Kentaro Suzuki (鈴木 健太郎, Suzuki Kentarō; born June 2, 1980) is a former Japanese football player.

== Playing career ==
Suzuki was born in Shibetsu on June 2, 1980. After graduating from high school, he joined J1 League club Bellmare Hiratsuka (later Shonan Bellmare) in 1999. However he could hardly play in the match and the club was relegated to J2 League from 2000. In 2001, he moved to J2 club Montedio Yamagata. He played as regular left side back in 2 seasons. In 2003, he moved to Tokyo Verdy. Although he played as regular player from May, he could not play at all in the match from June. In July, he moved to J2 club Albirex Niigata and became a regular player as left side back. The club also won the champions in 2003 and was promoted to J1 from 2004. However his opportunity to play decreased from 2004. In 2007, he moved to Ventforet Kofu. However he could hardly play in the match and retired end of 2007 season.

== Career statistics ==
Appearances and goals by club, season and competition
Club	Season	League			Emperor's Cup		J.League Cup		Total	
Club	Season	Division	Apps	Goals	Apps	Goals	Apps	Goals	Apps	Goals
Bellmare Hiratsuka	1999	J1 League	0	0	0	0	1	0	1	0
Shonan Bellmare	2000	J2 League	1	0	2	0	2	0	5	0
Montedio Yamagata	2001	J2 League	43	0	2	0	2	0	47	0
Montedio Yamagata	2002	J2 League	34	1	1	0	—		35	1
Tokyo Verdy	2003	J1 League	6	0	0	0	4	0	10	0
Albirex Niigata	2003	J2 League	17	1	2	0	—		19	1
Albirex Niigata	2004	J1 League	8	0	1	0	3	0	12	0
Albirex Niigata	2005	J1 League	7	0	0	0	2	0	9	0
Albirex Niigata	2006	J1 League	0	0	0	0	4	0	4	0
Ventforet Kofu	2007	J1 League	2	0	0	0	2	0	4	0
Career total			118	2	8	0	20	0	146	2
