= Takehito Shigehara =

Japanese footballer

Takehito Shigehara 茂原 岳人
Personal information
- Full name: Takehito Shigehara
- Date of birth: October 6, 1981 (age 45)
- Place of birth: Tatebayashi, Gunma, Japan
- Height: 1.80 m (5 ft 11 in)
- Position: Midfielder

Youth career
- 1997–1999: Maebashi Ikuei High School

Senior career*
Years	Team	Apps	(Gls)
2000–2001	Vissel Kobe	15	(1)
2002–2003	Kawasaki Frontale	69	(0)
2004	Kashiwa Reysol	15	(0)
2005	Sanfrecce Hiroshima	28	(0)
2006	Kawasaki Frontale	2	(0)
2006–2007	Ventforet Kofu	46	(11)
2008	Kashiwa Reysol	6	(0)
Total		181	(12)
Medal record
Kawasaki Frontale
Runner-up	J1 League	2006
Kashiwa Reysol
Runner-up	Emperor's Cup	2008
- * Club domestic league appearances and goals

Takehito Shigehara (茂原 岳人, Shigehara Takehito; born October 6, 1981) is a former Japanese football player.

== Playing career ==
Born and raised in Tatebayashi on October 6, 1981, Shigehara attended Maebashi Ikuei High School. After graduating from high school, he joined J1 League club Vissel Kobe in 2000. Shigehara got opportunity to play as midfielder from first season. In 2002, he moved to J2 League club Kawasaki Frontale. He became a regular player as defensive midfielder and played many matches in 2 seasons. In 2004, he moved to J1 club Kashiwa Reysol. Although he played many matches, he could not become a regular player. In 2005, he moved to J1 club Sanfrecce Hiroshima. He became a regular player as right midfielder. In 2006, he moved to J1 club Kawasaki Frontale again. Although he played as substitute midfielder in March, he was arrested on March 20 and he was sacked on March 31. In July 2006, he joined J1 club Ventforet Kofu. He played many matches as center forward and left wing. However the club was relegated to J2 end of 2007 season. In 2008, he moved to Kashiwa Reysol again. He played as regular left midfielder until April. However he was arrested in April in the case of 2001 and he was sacked in May.

== Club statistics ==
Club performance			League		Cup		League Cup		Total	
Season	Club	League	Apps	Goals	Apps	Goals	Apps	Goals	Apps	Goals
Japan			League		Emperor's Cup		J. League Cup		Total	
2000	Vissel Kobe	J1 League	6	1	4	1	0	0	10	2
2001	Vissel Kobe	J1 League	9	0	0	0	1	0	10	0
2002	Kawasaki Frontale	J2 League	30	0	4	1	-		34	1
2003	Kawasaki Frontale	J2 League	39	0	3	0	-		42	0
2004	Kashiwa Reysol	J1 League	15	0	0	0	4	1	19	1
2005	Sanfrecce Hiroshima	J1 League	28	0	1	0	5	0	34	0
2006	Kawasaki Frontale	J1 League	2	0	0	0	0	0	2	0
2006	Ventforet Kofu	J1 League	20	5	3	0	0	0	23	5
2007	Ventforet Kofu	J1 League	26	6	2	0	3	0	31	6
2008	Kashiwa Reysol	J1 League	6	0	0	0	1	0	7	0
Total			181	12	17	2	14	1	212	15
