= Hidenori Kato =

Japanese footballer

Hidenori Kato 加藤 秀典
Personal information
- Full name: Hidenori Kato
- Date of birth: May 13, 1981 (age 45)
- Place of birth: Yokkaichi, Mie, Japan
- Height: 1.79 m (5 ft 10 1/2 in)
- Position: Defender

Team information
- Current team: Matsue City FC
- Number: 39

Youth career
- 1997–1999: Yokkaichi Chuo Technical High School
- 2000–2003: Fukuoka University

Senior career*
Years	Team	Apps	(Gls)
2004–2008	Sagan Tosu	86	(2)
2008–2012	Gainare Tottori	108	(1)
2013–2019	Veertien Mie	101	(5)
2019–	Matsue City FC		
- * Club domestic league appearances and goals

Hidenori Kato (加藤 秀典, Kato Hidenori; born May 13, 1981) is a Japanese football player.

== Career statistics ==
Appearances and goals by club, season and competition
Club	Season	League			Emperor's Cup		Total	
Club	Season	Division	Apps	Goals	Apps	Goals	Apps	Goals
Sagan Tosu	2004	J2 League	16	0	2	0	18	0
Sagan Tosu	2005	J2 League	21	1	1	0	22	1
Sagan Tosu	2006	J2 League	27	0	1	0	28	0
Sagan Tosu	2007	J2 League	10	1	3	0	13	1
Sagan Tosu	2008	J2 League	12	0	0	0	12	0
Gainare Tottori	2008	JFL	12	1	0	0	12	1
Gainare Tottori	2009	JFL	25	0	0	0	25	0
Gainare Tottori	2010	JFL						
Career total			123	3	7	0	130	3
