= Noriaki Sanenobu =

Japanese footballer

Noriaki Sanenobu 実信憲明
Personal information
- Full name: Noriaki Sanenobu
- Date of birth: May 7, 1980 (age 46)
- Place of birth: Hiroshima, Japan
- Height: 1.65 m (5 ft 5 in)
- Position: Midfielder

Youth career
- 1999–2002: Tokyo University of Agriculture

Senior career*
Years	Team	Apps	(Gls)
2003–2013	Gainare Tottori	327	(45)
2014–2017	Matsue City FC		
- * Club domestic league appearances and goals as of 22 February 2014

Noriaki Sanenobu (実信 憲明, Sanenobu Noriaki; born May 7, 1980) is a former Japanese football player and is currently manager of FC Kagura Shimane

== Career statistics ==
Updated to 22 February 2014.

Appearances and goals by club, season and competition
Club	Season	League			Emperor's Cup		Total	
Club	Season	Division	Apps	Goals	Apps	Goals	Apps	Goals
SC Tottori	2003	JFL	22	3	2	0	24	3
SC Tottori	2004	JFL	25	3	2	0	27	3
SC Tottori	2005	JFL	25	2	2	0	27	2
SC Tottori	2006	JFL	33	9	2	0	35	9
Gainare Tottori	2007	JFL	29	2	2	0	31	2
Gainare Tottori	2008	JFL	30	4	1	0	31	4
Gainare Tottori	2009	JFL	31	5	1	0	32	5
Gainare Tottori	2010	JFL	32	5	1	0	33	5
Gainare Tottori	2011	J2 League	37	9	2	0	39	9
Gainare Tottori	2012	J2 League	28	3	1	0	29	3
Gainare Tottori	2013	J2 League	35	0	1	0	36	0
Career total			327	45	17	0	344	45
