= 2011 Kyoto Sanga FC season =

Kyoto Sanga FC
2011 season
- Manager: Takeshi Oki
- Stadium: Kyoto Nishikyogoku Athletic Stadium
- J2 League: 7 th

2011 Kyoto Sanga FC season.

== J2 League ==
Match	Date	Team	Score	Team	Venue	Attendance
1	2011.03.05	Mito HollyHock	2-1	Kyoto Sanga FC	K's denki Stadium Mito	4,222
8	2011.04.24	Kyoto Sanga FC	2-1	Fagiano Okayama	Kyoto Nishikyogoku Athletic Stadium	9,161
9	2011.04.30	Tochigi SC	1-0	Kyoto Sanga FC	Tochigi Green Stadium	4,473
10	2011.05.04	Kyoto Sanga FC	0-0	Sagan Tosu	Kyoto Nishikyogoku Athletic Stadium	8,924
11	2011.05.08	Tokushima Vortis	2-1	Kyoto Sanga FC	Pocarisweat Stadium	4,694
12	2011.05.15	Kyoto Sanga FC	0-0	Kataller Toyama	Kyoto Nishikyogoku Athletic Stadium	5,464
13	2011.05.22	Giravanz Kitakyushu	1-0	Kyoto Sanga FC	Honjo Stadium	2,911
14	2011.05.28	Kyoto Sanga FC	1-4	FC Tokyo	Kyoto Nishikyogoku Athletic Stadium	5,330
15	2011.06.05	Gainare Tottori	2-1	Kyoto Sanga FC	Tottori Bank Bird Stadium	3,406
16	2011.06.12	Kyoto Sanga FC	2-0	Oita Trinita	Kyoto Nishikyogoku Athletic Stadium	7,045
17	2011.06.19	Thespa Kusatsu	2-4	Kyoto Sanga FC	Shoda Shoyu Stadium Gunma	3,106
18	2011.06.26	Kyoto Sanga FC	1-1	Yokohama FC	Kyoto Nishikyogoku Athletic Stadium	8,075
2	2011.06.29	Kyoto Sanga FC	0-1	Roasso Kumamoto	Kyoto Nishikyogoku Athletic Stadium	4,015
19	2011.07.03	FC Gifu	3-2	Kyoto Sanga FC	Gifu Nagaragawa Stadium	3,337
20	2011.07.10	Kyoto Sanga FC	1-1	Tochigi SC	Kyoto Nishikyogoku Athletic Stadium	4,402
21	2011.07.18	Ehime FC	0-2	Kyoto Sanga FC	Ningineer Stadium	2,213
22	2011.07.24	Sagan Tosu	2-1	Kyoto Sanga FC	Best Amenity Stadium	4,825
23	2011.07.31	Kyoto Sanga FC	1-0	Gainare Tottori	Kyoto Nishikyogoku Athletic Stadium	5,204
3	2011.08.06	Tokyo Verdy	1-1	Kyoto Sanga FC	Ajinomoto Stadium	3,007
24	2011.08.14	Kyoto Sanga FC	1-0	Giravanz Kitakyushu	Kyoto Nishikyogoku Athletic Stadium	5,185
25	2011.08.21	Consadole Sapporo	2-1	Kyoto Sanga FC	Chiyogadai Park Athletic Studium	6,310
26	2011.08.27	Kyoto Sanga FC	2-1	JEF United Chiba	Kyoto Nishikyogoku Athletic Stadium	8,765
4	2011.09.01	Kyoto Sanga FC	0-0	Ehime FC	Kyoto Nishikyogoku Athletic Stadium	2,386
27	2011.09.10	FC Tokyo	6-1	Kyoto Sanga FC	Ajinomoto Stadium	15,517
28	2011.09.18	Kyoto Sanga FC	3-1	Thespa Kusatsu	Kyoto Nishikyogoku Athletic Stadium	5,787
29	2011.09.25	Kataller Toyama	1-1	Kyoto Sanga FC	Toyama Stadium	3,586
5	2011.09.28	JEF United Chiba	0-1	Kyoto Sanga FC	Fukuda Denshi Arena	6,955
30	2011.10.02	Kyoto Sanga FC	0-2	Mito HollyHock	Kyoto Nishikyogoku Athletic Stadium	4,465
31	2011.10.16	Kyoto Sanga FC	1-2	Tokushima Vortis	Kyoto Nishikyogoku Athletic Stadium	5,690
6	2011.10.19	Kyoto Sanga FC	4-0	Consadole Sapporo	Kyoto Nishikyogoku Athletic Stadium	3,601
32	2011.10.23	Oita Trinita	1-3	Kyoto Sanga FC	Oita Bank Dome	8,522
7	2011.10.26	Shonan Bellmare	0-1	Kyoto Sanga FC	Hiratsuka Stadium	6,104
33	2011.10.29	Kyoto Sanga FC	1-0	Shonan Bellmare	Kyoto Nishikyogoku Athletic Stadium	7,090
34	2011.11.06	Roasso Kumamoto	1-2	Kyoto Sanga FC	Kumamoto Suizenji Stadium	2,847
35	2011.11.12	Kyoto Sanga FC	1-0	Tokyo Verdy	Kyoto Nishikyogoku Athletic Stadium	12,287
36	2011.11.20	Fagiano Okayama	2-1	Kyoto Sanga FC	Kanko Stadium	7,150
37	2011.11.27	Yokohama FC	1-2	Kyoto Sanga FC	NHK Spring Mitsuzawa Football Stadium	5,350
38	2011.12.03	Kyoto Sanga FC	3-1	FC Gifu	Kyoto Nishikyogoku Athletic Stadium	6,715
