= Yota Akimoto =

Japanese footballer

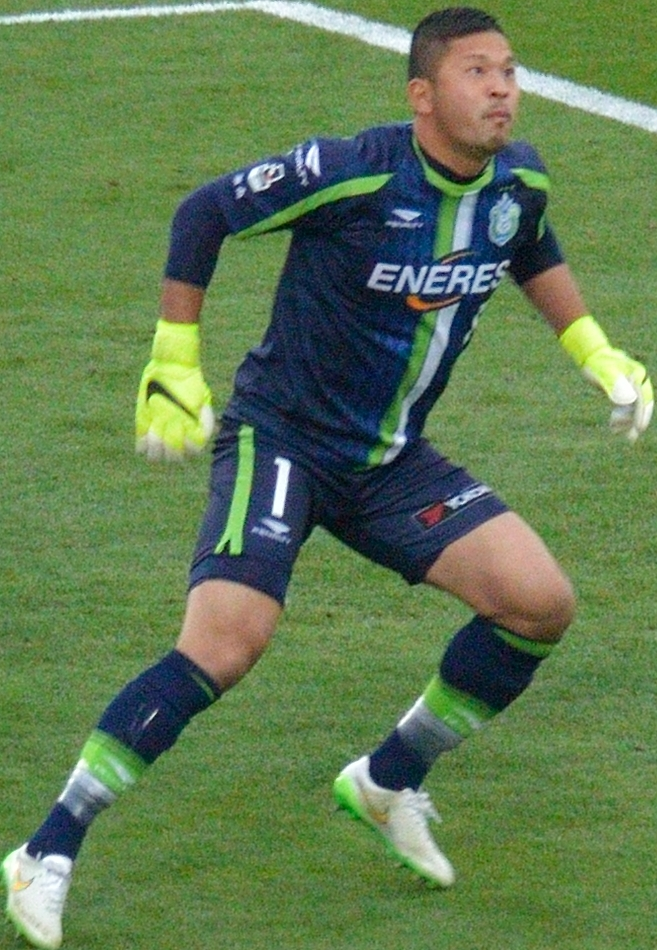

Personal information
- Full name: Yota Akimoto
- Date of birth: July 11, 1987 (age 39)
- Place of birth: Machida, Tokyo, Japan
- Height: 1.81 m (5 ft 11 in)
- Position: Goalkeeper

Team information
- Current team: Ehime FC (on loan from Shonan Bellmare)

Youth career
- CYD Football Club
- 2000–2005: Yokohama F. Marinos

Senior career*
Years	Team	Apps	(Gls)
2006–2011	Yokohama F. Marinos	5	(0)
2012–2013	Ehime FC	83	(0)
2014–2015	Shonan Bellmare	76	(0)
2016	FC Tokyo	34	(0)
2017–	Shonan Bellmare	106	(0)
2020	→ Machida Zelvia (loan)	29	(0)
2021–	→ Ehime FC (loan)	0	(0)
Medal record
Shonan Bellmare
Winner	J.League Cup	2018
- * Club domestic league appearances and goals as of 19:51, 16 January 2021 (UTC)

Yota Akimoto (秋元 陽太, Akimoto Yōta; born July 11, 1987 in Machida, Tokyo) is a Japanese footballer. He currently plays for Ehime FC on loan from Shonan Bellmare.

== Career statistics ==
=== Club ===
Updated to 18 January 2019.

Club	Season	League		Emperor's Cup		J. League Cup		AFC		Other^{1}		Total	
Club	Season	Apps	Goals	Apps	Goals	Apps	Goals	Apps	Goals	Apps	Goals	Apps	Goals
Yokohama F. Marinos	2006	0	0	0	0	0	0	-		-		0	0
Yokohama F. Marinos	2007	0	0	0	0	0	0	-		-		0	0
Yokohama F. Marinos	2008	3	0	0	0	0	0	-		-		3	0
Yokohama F. Marinos	2009	1	0	1	0	0	0	-		-		2	0
Yokohama F. Marinos	2010	0	0	1	0	0	0	-		-		1	0
Yokohama F. Marinos	2011	1	0	0	0	0	0	-		-		1	0
Ehime F.C.	2012	42	0	1	0	-		-		-		43	0
Ehime F.C.	2013	41	0	0	0	-		-		-		41	0
Shonan Bellmare	2014	42	0	1	0	-		-		-		43	0
Shonan Bellmare	2015	34	0	0	0	2	0	-		-		36	0
FC Tokyo	2016	34	0	2	0	4	0	8	0	-		48	0
Shonan Bellmare	2017	42	0	0	0	–		–		–		42	0
Shonan Bellmare	2018	34	0	1	0	8	0	–		–		43	0
Career total		274	0	7	0	14	0	8	0	0	0	303	0

^{1}Includes Japanese Super Cup.
