= Eiichiro Ozaki =

Japanese footballer

Eiichiro Ozaki 尾崎 瑛一郎
Personal information
- Full name: Eiichiro Ozaki
- Date of birth: December 7, 1984 (age 41)
- Place of birth: Shizuoka, Shizuoka, Japan
- Height: 1.72 m (5 ft 7 1/2 in)
- Position: Defender

Team information
- Current team: Azul Claro Numazu
- Number: 18

Youth career
- 2000–2002: Nissei Gakuen Daini High School

Senior career*
Years	Team	Apps	(Gls)
2003	Albirex Niigata	17	(0)
2004–2007	Albirex Niigata Singapore	87	(21)
2008–2013	Gainare Tottori	138	(6)
2014–	Azul Claro Numazu	114	(7)
- * Club domestic league appearances and goals

Eiichiro Ozaki (尾崎 瑛一郎, Ozaki Eiichiro; born December 7, 1984) is a Japanese football player who plays for Fukui United.

== Club statistics ==
Updated to 23 February 2018.

Club performance			League		Cup		Total	
Season	Club	League	Apps	Goals	Apps	Goals	Apps	Goals
Japan			League		Emperor's Cup		Total	
2003	Albirex Niigata	J2 League	17	0	0	0	17	0
Singapore			League		Singapore Cup		Total	
2004	Albirex Niigata; Singapore	S. League	20	2	1	0	21	2
2005	Albirex Niigata; Singapore	S. League	3	1	0	0	3	1
2006	Albirex Niigata; Singapore	S. League	32	14	3	1	35	15
2007	Albirex Niigata; Singapore	S. League	32	4	1	0	33	4
Japan			League		Emperor's Cup		Total	
2008	Gainare Tottori	JFL	20	2	0	0	20	2
2009	Gainare Tottori	JFL	20	1	1	0	21	1
2010	Gainare Tottori	JFL	24	2	0	0	24	2
2011	Gainare Tottori	J2 League	13	0	1	0	14	0
2012	Gainare Tottori	J2 League	29	1	2	1	31	2
2013	Gainare Tottori	J2 League	32	0	1	0	33	0
2014	Azul Claro Numazu	JFL	23	1	–		23	1
2015	Azul Claro Numazu	JFL	24	1	–		24	1
2016	Azul Claro Numazu	JFL	28	1	–		28	1
2017	Azul Claro Numazu	J3 League	31	3	0	0	31	3
Country	Japan		261	12	5	1	266	13
Country	Singapore		87	21	5	1	92	22
Total			348	33	10	2	358	35
