= Kengo Ishii =

Japanese footballer (born 1986)

Personal information
- Full name: Kengo Ishii
- Date of birth: 2 April 1986 (age 40)
- Place of birth: Ishikari, Hokkaidō, Japan
- Height: 1.78 m (5 ft 10 in)
- Position: Forward

Team information
- Current team: Nankatsu SC

Youth career
- 2002–2004: Consadole Sapporo

Senior career*
Years	Team	Apps	(Gls)
2005–2009	Consadole Sapporo	115	(17)
2010–2013	Ehime FC	126	(18)
2014–2017	Hokkaido Consadole Sapporo	81	(5)
2018	Samut Sakhon	23	(8)
2019–	Nankatsu SC		
- * Club domestic league appearances and goals as of 30 November 2017

Kengo Ishii (石井 謙伍, Ishii Kengo; born 2 April 1986 in Ishikari, Hokkaidō) is a Japanese footballer who currently plays for Nankatsu SC.

== Club statistics ==
Updated to 30 November 2017.

Club performance			League		Cup		League Cup		Total	
Season	Club	League	Apps	Goals	Apps	Goals	Apps	Goals	Apps	Goals
Japan			League		Emperor's Cup		J. League Cup		Total	
2005	Consadole Sapporo	J2 League	17	1	1	0	–		18	1
2006	Consadole Sapporo	J2 League	37	9	4	0	–		41	9
2007	Consadole Sapporo	J2 League	36	6	1	1	–		37	7
2008	Consadole Sapporo	J1 League	9	0	0	0	3	0	12	0
2009	Consadole Sapporo	J2 League	16	1	1	0	–		17	1
2010	Ehime FC	J2 League	28	3	1	0	–		29	3
2011	Ehime FC	J2 League	32	4	3	1	–		35	5
2012	Ehime FC	J2 League	37	6	1	0	–		38	6
2013	Ehime FC	J2 League	29	5	0	0	–		29	5
2014	Consadole Sapporo	J2 League	36	3	0	0	–		36	3
2015	Consadole Sapporo	J2 League	14	1	0	0	–		14	1
2016	Hokkaido Consadole Sapporo	27	1	1	0	–		28	1	
2017	Hokkaido Consadole Sapporo	J1 League	4	0	0	–				
Total			318	40	12	2	13	2	334	42
