= Yasuhiro Okuyama =

Japanese footballer

Yasuhiro Okuyama 奥山 泰裕
Personal information
- Full name: Yasuhiro Okuyama
- Date of birth: 21 November 1985 (age 40)
- Place of birth: Miyagi, Japan
- Height: 1.70 m (5 ft 7 in)
- Position: Midfielder

Team information
- Current team: Cobaltore Onagawa
- Number: 25

Youth career
- 2004–2007: Tohoku Gakuin University

Senior career*
Years	Team	Apps	(Gls)
2008	JEF United Chiba	0	(0)
2009–2014	Gainare Tottori	142	(8)
2015–2019	ReinMeer Aomori	108	(5)
2021–	Cobaltore Onagawa	20	(10)
- * Club domestic league appearances and goals as of 20 January 2023, 2:20 (UTC)

Yasuhiro Okuyama (奥山 泰裕, Okuyama Yasuhiro; born November 21, 1985) is a Japanese footballer who plays in the Tohoku Soccer League for Cobaltore Onagawa.

== Career statistics ==
=== Club ===
Updated to the start of the 2023 season.

Club performance			League		Cup		League Cup		Total	
Season	Club	League	Apps	Goals	Apps	Goals	Apps	Goals	Apps	Goals
Japan			League		Emperor's Cup		J.League Cup		Total	
2008	JEF United Chiba	J1 League	0	0	0	0	0	0	0	0
2009	Gainare Tottori	JFL	7	0	0	0	–		7	0
2010	Gainare Tottori	JFL	26	4	1	0	–		27	4
2011	Gainare Tottori	J2 League	34	0	0	0	–		34	0
2012	Gainare Tottori	J2 League	37	1	2	0	–		39	1
2013	Gainare Tottori	J2 League	25	3	1	0	–		26	3
2014	Gainare Tottori	J3 League	13	0	1	0	–		14	0
2015	ReinMeer Aomori	Tohoku Soccer League Div. 1	18	7	1	0	–		19	7
2016	ReinMeer Aomori	JFL	29	0	–		–		29	0
2017	ReinMeer Aomori	JFL	26	2	–		–		26	2
2018	ReinMeer Aomori	JFL	27	3	2	0	–		29	3
2019	ReinMeer Aomori	JFL	17	0	–		–		17	0
2021	Cobaltore Onagawa	Tohoku Soccer League Div. 1	8	6	0	0	–		8	6
2022	Cobaltore Onagawa	Tohoku Soccer League Div. 1	12	4	0	0	–		12	4
2023	Cobaltore Onagawa	Tohoku Soccer League Div. 1	0	0	0	0	–		0	0
Total			284	26	8	0	0	0	292	26
