= Toshitaka Kajino =

Japanese astronomer

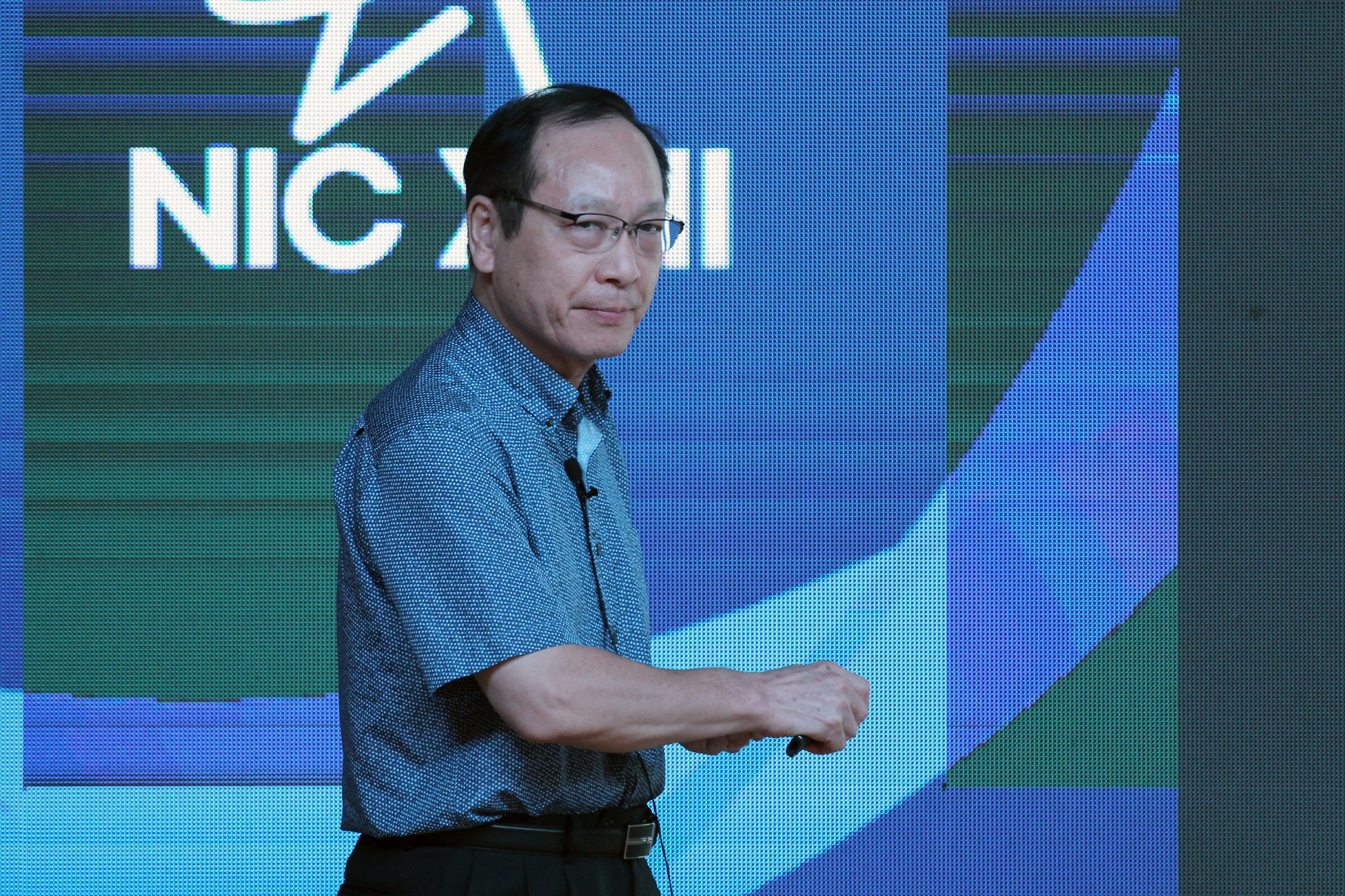

Toshitaka Kajino (梶野 敏貴) is a Japanese astronomer from Kashiwazaki, Niigata Prefecture, Japan. His specialty is theoretical astronomy, especially nuclear astrophysics and cosmology.

Organizer of Cosmology and Nuclear Astrophysics (COSNAP) group in the National Astronomical Observatory of Japan. Doctor of Science (Physics).

He was a student of Akito Arima who was a President of the University of Tokyo and a Minister of Education. Many cosmologists have been produced from Toshitaka Kajino's laboratory.

== History ==
- 1956 Born in Kashiwazaki, Niigata Prefecture.
- 1984 Completed the Doctoral Course, Graduate School of Science, University of Tokyo
- 1984 Assistant Professor in Tokyo Metropolitan University.
- 1993 Associate Professor, National Astronomical Observatory of Japan
- 1994 Associate Professor, Department of Astronomy, Graduate School of Science, The University of Tokyo (Concurrency).
- 1995 Associate Professor, Department of Astronomical Science, the Graduate University of Advanced Studies (Concurrency),
- 2004 Awarded the American Physical Society Fellowship (APS Fellow).

The reason for the award is "For significant contributions to nuclear astrophysics and theoretical nuclear physics and for the promotion of scientific exchange between Japan and the international community".

- 2016 One Thousand Talents (Foreign Expert) employed by the Chinese government.
- 2017 Distinguished Professor and Director of the International Research Center for Big Bang Cosmology and Elemental Genesis, Beihang University (Concurrency).
- 2019 Professor, National Astronomical Observatory of Japan
