= Shunsuke Oyama =

Japanese footballer (born 1986)

Shunsuke Oyama 大山 俊輔
Personal information
- Full name: Shunsuke Oyama
- Date of birth: April 6, 1986 (age 40)
- Place of birth: Saitama, Saitama, Japan
- Height: 1.79 m (5 ft 10 1/2 in)
- Position: Midfielder

Youth career
- 1999–2004: Urawa Reds

Senior career*
| Years | Team | Apps | (Gls) |
| 2004–2006 | Urawa Reds | 1 | (0) |
| 2007 | Ehime FC | 46 | (1) |
| 2008 | Shonan Bellmare | 16 | (0) |
| 2009–2012 | Ehime FC | 128 | (8) |
| 2013–2016 | Kataller Toyama | 42 | (0) |
| Total | | 233 | (9) |
Medal record
Urawa Reds
| Winner | J1 League | 2006 |
| Runner-up | J1 League | 2004 |
| Runner-up | J1 League | 2005 |
| Runner-up | J.League Cup | 2004 |
| Winner | Emperor's Cup | 2005 |
| Winner | Emperor's Cup | 2006 |
- * Club domestic league appearances and goals

Shunsuke Oyama (大山 俊輔, Ōyama Shunsuke; born April 6, 1986) is a former Japanese football player.

== Career statistics ==
Updated to 23 February 2016.

Appearances and goals by club, season and competition
| Club | Season | League | | | Emperor's Cup | | J.League Cup | | Total | |
| Club | Season | Division | Apps | Goals | Apps | Goals | Apps | Goals | Apps | Goals |
|---|---|---|---|---|---|---|---|---|---|---|
| Urawa Reds | 2004 | J1 League | 1 | 0 | 0 | 0 | 0 | 0 | 1 | 0 |
| Urawa Reds | 2005 | J1 League | 0 | 0 | 0 | 0 | 0 | 0 | 0 | 0 |
| Urawa Reds | 2006 | J1 League | 0 | 0 | 0 | 0 | 0 | 0 | 0 | 0 |
| Ehime FC | 2007 | J2 League | 46 | 1 | 4 | 0 | — | | 50 | 1 |
| Shonan Bellmare | 2008 | J2 League | 16 | 0 | 0 | 0 | — | | 16 | 0 |
| Ehime FC | 2009 | J2 League | 46 | 2 | 0 | 0 | — | | 46 | 2 |
| Ehime FC | 2010 | J2 League | 18 | 0 | 0 | 0 | — | | 18 | 0 |
| Ehime FC | 2011 | J2 League | 30 | 2 | 2 | 0 | — | | 32 | 2 |
| Ehime FC | 2012 | J2 League | 34 | 4 | 0 | 0 | — | | 34 | 4 |
| Kataller Toyama | 2013 | J2 League | 20 | 0 | 0 | 0 | — | | 20 | 0 |
| Kataller Toyama | 2014 | J2 League | 7 | 0 | 2 | 0 | — | | 9 | 0 |
| Kataller Toyama | 2015 | J2 League | 15 | 0 | — | | — | | 15 | 0 |
| Career total | | | 233 | 9 | 8 | 0 | 0 | 0 | 241 | 9 |
