= Eigo Sekine =

Japanese footballer

Personal information
- Full name: Eigo Sekine
- Date of birth: September 11, 1981 (age 45)
- Place of birth: Saitama, Japan
- Height: 1.76 m (5 ft 9 1/2 in)
- Position: Defender

Senior career*
Years	Team	Apps	(Gls)
2000–2004	Honda Luminozo Sayama		
2005–2014	Ehime FC	191	(3)
Total		191	(3)
- * Club domestic league appearances and goals

Eigo Sekine (関根 永悟, Sekine Eigo; born September 11, 1981) is a former Japanese football player.

== Club statistics ==
Club performance			League		Cup		Total	
Season	Club	League	Apps	Goals	Apps	Goals	Apps	Goals
Japan			League		Emperor's Cup		Total	
2005	Ehime FC	Football League	14	1	2	0	16	1
2006	Ehime FC	J2 League	15	1	1	0	16	1
2007	Ehime FC	J2 League	20	0	2	0	22	0
2008	Ehime FC	J2 League	18	0	2	0	20	0
2009	Ehime FC	J2 League	30	0	1	0	31	0
2010	Ehime FC	J2 League						
Country	Japan		97	2	8	0	105	2
Total			97	2	8	0	105	2
