= Yokkaichi University =

Coordinates: 35.0221°N 136.6073°E

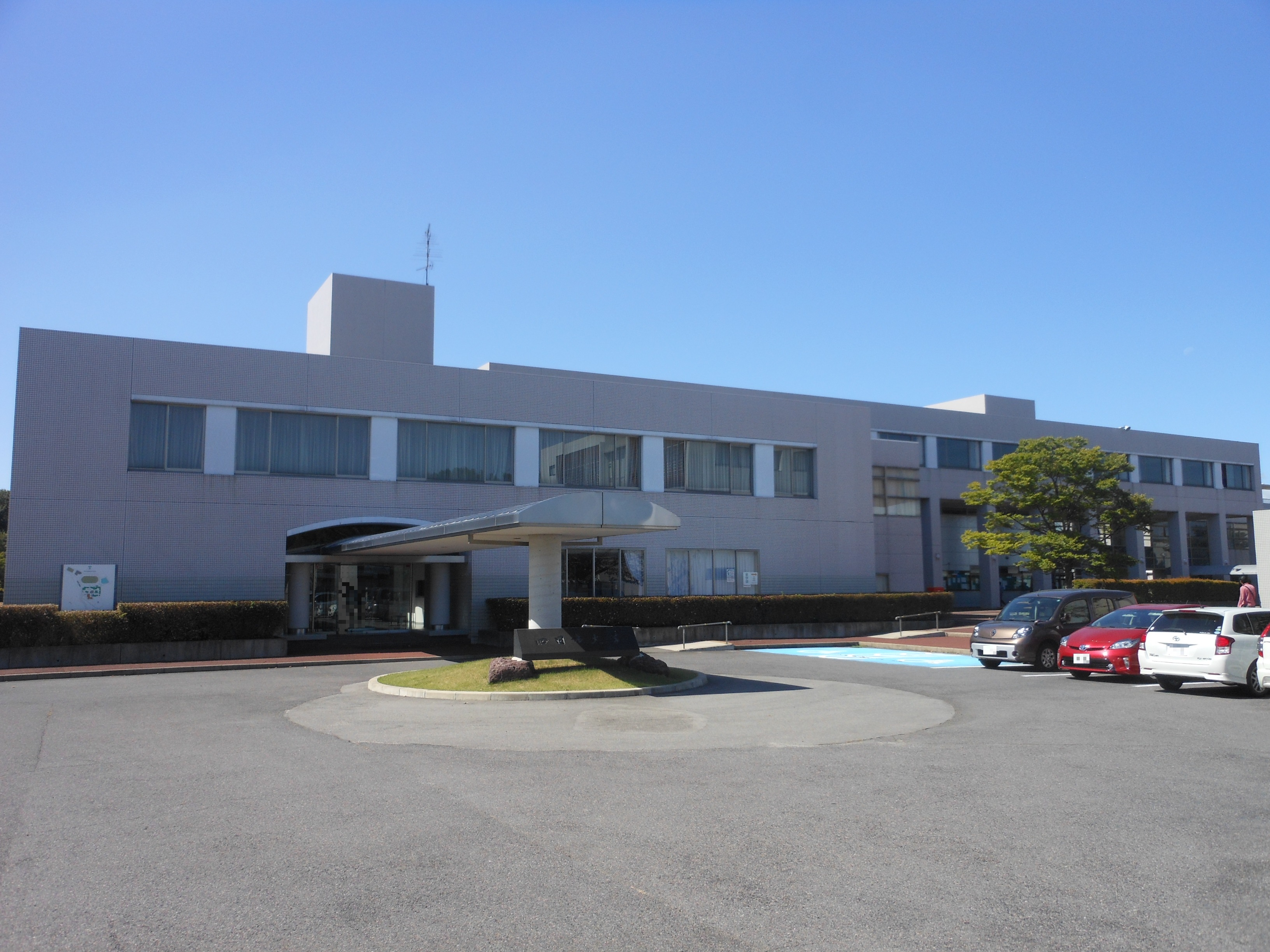
Main building of Yokkaichi University

Yokkaichi University (四日市大学, Yokkaichi daigaku) is a private university in Yokkaichi, Mie, Japan. The predecessor of the school, women's school, was founded in 1946, and it was chartered as a university in 1988.
