= Kenta Togawa =

Japanese footballer

Kenta Togawa 戸川 健太
Personal information
- Full name: Kenta Togawa
- Date of birth: June 23, 1981 (age 45)
- Place of birth: Itabashi, Tokyo, Japan
- Height: 1.80 m (5 ft 11 in)
- Position: Defender

Youth career
- 1997–1999: Verdy Kawasaki
- 2000–2003: Meiji University

Senior career*
Years	Team	Apps	(Gls)
2004–2007	Tokyo Verdy	97	(2)
2008–2010	Yokohama FC	52	(3)
2011–2014	Gainare Tottori	103	(6)
2015–2016	Fukushima United FC	29	(2)
Total		281	(13)
- * Club domestic league appearances and goals

Kenta Togawa (戸川 健太, Togawa Kenta; born June 23, 1981) is a former Japanese football player.

== Club statistics ==
Club performance			League		Cup		League Cup		Continental		Total	
Season	Club	League	Apps	Goals	Apps	Goals	Apps	Goals	Apps	Goals	Apps	Goals
Japan			League		Emperor's Cup		J.League Cup		Asia		Total	
2003	Tokyo Verdy	J1 League	0	0	1	0	0	0	-		1	0
2004	Tokyo Verdy	J1 League	15	0	0	0	7	0	-		22	0
2005	Tokyo Verdy	J1 League	19	0	1	0	6	0	-		26	0
2006	Tokyo Verdy	J2 League	31	1	1	0	-		2	0	34	1
2007	Tokyo Verdy	J2 League	32	1	1	0	-		-		33	1
2008	Yokohama FC	J2 League	9	0	0	0	-		-		9	0
2009	Yokohama FC	J2 League	28	2	1	0	-		-		29	2
2010	Yokohama FC	J2 League	15	1	1	0	-		-		16	1
2011	Gainare Tottori	J2 League	38	3	2	0	-		-		40	3
2012	Gainare Tottori	J2 League	34	2	1	0	-		-		35	2
2013	Gainare Tottori	J2 League	0	0	0	0	-		-		0	0
2014	Gainare Tottori	J3 League	31	1	2	0	-		-		33	1
2015	Fukushima United FC	J3 League	14	2	0	0	-		-		14	2
2016	Fukushima United FC	J3 League	0	0	0	0	-		-		0	0
Total			266	13	11	0	13	0	2	0	292	13
