= Hidemi Jinushizono =

Japanese footballer

Hidemi Jinushizono 地主園 秀美
Personal information
- Full name: Hidemi Jinushizono
- Date of birth: 14 April 1989 (age 37)
- Place of birth: Kagoshima, Japan
- Height: 1.68 m (5 ft 6 in)
- Position: Midfielder

Youth career
- 2008–2011: Tokai Gakuen University

Senior career*
| Years | Team | Apps | (Gls) |
| 2011–2014 | FC Gifu | 34 | (3) |
| 2011–2014 | Kagoshima United FC Second | 5 | (0) |
| 2015–2022 | FC Maruyasu Okazaki | 158 | (9) |
- * Club domestic league appearances and goals as of 14 January 2023, 13:32 (UTC)

Hidemi Jinushizono (地主園 秀美, Jinushizono Hidemi; born April 14, 1989) is a Japanese former football player.

== Career ==
On 4 January 2023, Jinushizono announcement officially retirement from football after 12 years career at professional.

== Career statistics ==
Updated to 20 February 2015.

Appearances and goals by club, season and competition
| Club | Season | League | | | Emperor's Cup | | Total | |
| Club | Season | Division | Apps | Goals | Apps | Goals | Apps | Goals |
|---|---|---|---|---|---|---|---|---|
| FC Gifu | 2011 | J2 League | 16 | 1 | 0 | 0 | 16 | 1 |
| FC Gifu | 2012 | J2 League | 18 | 2 | 1 | 0 | 19 | 2 |
| FC Gifu | 2013 | J2 League | 0 | 0 | 0 | 0 | 0 | 0 |
| FC Gifu | 2014 | J2 League | 0 | 0 | 0 | 0 | 0 | 0 |
| FC Maruyasu Okazaki | 2015 | JFL | 0 | 0 | 0 | 0 | 0 | 0 |
| Career total | | | 34 | 3 | 0 | 0 | 35 | 3 |
