= Takanori Maeno =

Japanese footballer (born 1988)

Takanori Maeno 前野 貴徳
Personal information
- Full name: Takanori Maeno
- Date of birth: 14 April 1988 (age 38)
- Place of birth: Matsuyama, Ehime, Japan
- Height: 1.72 m (5 ft 7 1/2 in)
- Position: Left back

Team information
- Current team: Ehime FC
- Number: 5

Youth career
- –2006: Ehime FC

College career
Years	Team	Apps	(Gls)
2007–2010	Ritsumeikan University		

Senior career*
Years	Team	Apps	(Gls)
2011–2012	Ehime FC	74	(5)
2013–2014	Kashima Antlers	22	(0)
2015–2017	Albirex Niigata	24	(0)
2018–2024	Ehime FC	145	(1)
- * Club domestic league appearances and goals as of 1 September 2023

Takanori Maeno (前野 貴徳, Maeno Takanori; born 14 April 1988) is a Japanese football player for Ehime FC.

== Career statistics ==
=== Club ===
Updated to end of 2018 season.

Club	Season	League		Emperor's Cup		J. League Cup		Other^{1}		Total	
Club	Season	Apps	Goals	Apps	Goals	Apps	Goals	Apps	Goals	Apps	Goals
Ehime FC	2011	33	2	3	0	-		-		36	2
Ehime FC	2012	41	3	1	0	-		-		42	3
Kashima Antlers	2013	20	0	0	0	4	0	1	0	25	0
Kashima Antlers	2014	2	0	0	0	1	0	0	0	3	0
Albirex Niigata	2015	14	0	1	0	7	0	-		22	0
Albirex Niigata	2016	10	0	1	0	2	0	-		13	0
Albirex Niigata	2017	0	0	0	0	0	0	-		0	0
Ehime FC	2018	39	1	0	0	-		-		39	1
Career total		159	6	6	0	14	0	1	0	180	6

^{1}Includes Suruga Bank Championship.

== Honours ==
=== Club ===
Kashima Antlers

- Suruga Bank Championship (1) : 2013
