= Kazuhito Watanabe =

Japanese footballer

Kazuhito Watanabe 渡邊 一仁
Personal information
- Full name: Kazuhito Watanabe
- Date of birth: September 1, 1986 (age 40)
- Place of birth: Matsuyama, Ehime, Japan
- Height: 1.76 m (5 ft 9 1/2 in)
- Position: Midfielder

Team information
- Current team: Ehime FC
- Number: 24

Youth career
- 2005–2008: Tokyo Gakugei University

Senior career*
Years	Team	Apps	(Gls)
2009–2014	Ehime FC	132	(0)
2015–2017	Fagiano Okayama	89	(0)
2018–2019	Yokohama FC	52	(1)
2020–	Ehime FC	2	(0)
- * Club domestic league appearances and goals as of 14 April 2020

Kazuhito Watanabe (渡邊 一仁, born September 1, 1986) is a Japanese football player for Ehime FC.

== Club statistics ==
Updated to 14 April 2020.

Club performance			League		Cup		Total	
Season	Club	League	Apps	Goals	Apps	Goals	Apps	Goals
Japan			League		Emperor's Cup		Total	
2009	Ehime FC	J2 League	14	0	1	0	15	0
2010	Ehime FC	J2 League	28	0	1	0	29	0
2011	Ehime FC	J2 League	30	0	2	0	32	0
2012	Ehime FC	J2 League	18	0	1	0	19	0
2013	Ehime FC	J2 League	15	0	1	0	16	0
2014	Ehime FC	J2 League	27	0	2	0	29	0
2015	Fagiano Okayama	J2 League	37	0	1	0	38	0
2016	Fagiano Okayama	J2 League	22	0	2	0	24	0
2017	Fagiano Okayama	J2 League	30	0	1	0	31	0
2018	Yokohama FC	J2 League	38	1	0	0	38	1
2019	Yokohama FC	J2 League	14	0	2	0	16	0
Total			273	1	14	0	287	1
