= Kim Yong-gi (footballer) =

South Korean footballer

Kim Yong-Gi
Personal information
- Full name: Kim Yong-Gi
- Date of birth: August 1, 1989 (age 37)
- Place of birth: South Korea
- Height: 1.87 m (6 ft 1 1/2 in)
- Position: Defender

Team information
- Current team: Pocheon FC

Senior career*
Years	Team	Apps	(Gls)
2012–2013	Mito HollyHock	28	(1)
2015–	Pocheon FC		
- * Club domestic league appearances and goals

Kim Yong-Gi (born August 1, 1989) is a South Korean football player.
