= Yuichi Kubo =

Japanese footballer (born 1988)

Yuichi Kubo 久保 裕一
Personal information
- Full name: Yuichi Kubo
- Date of birth: September 26, 1988 (age 38)
- Place of birth: Kinokawa, Japan
- Height: 1.81 m (5 ft 11 1/2 in)
- Position: Striker

Team information
- Current team: SC Sagamihara
- Number: 13

Youth career
- 2004–2006: Nagoya Grampus Youth
- 2007–2010: Meiji University

Senior career*
Years	Team	Apps	(Gls)
2010–2013	JEF United Chiba	30	(1)
2012–2013	→ Gainare Tottori (loan)	48	(10)
2014–2016	Fagiano Okayama	54	(6)
2016	→ Mito HollyHock (loan)	14	(0)
2017–	SC Sagamihara	28	(4)
- * Club domestic league appearances and goals as of 23 February 2018

Yuichi Kubo (久保 裕一, born September 26, 1988) is a Japanese footballer who plays for Fagiano Okayama, as a striker for SC Sagamihara.

== Club statistics ==
Updated to 23 February 2018.

Season	Club	League	League		Emperor's Cup		Total	
Season	Club	League	Apps	Goals	Apps	Goals	Apps	Goals
2010	JEF United Chiba	J2 League	1	0	0	0	1	0
2011	JEF United Chiba	J2 League	27	1	3	0	30	1
2012	JEF United Chiba	J2 League	2	0	–		2	0
2012	Gainare Tottori	J2 League	16	2	2	0	18	2
2013	Gainare Tottori	J2 League	32	8	1	0	33	8
2014	Fagiano Okayama	J2 League	28	4	0	0	28	4
2015	Fagiano Okayama	J2 League	21	2	1	0	22	2
2016	Fagiano Okayama	J2 League	5	0	–		5	0
2016	Mito HollyHock	J2 League	14	0	2	0	16	0
2017	SC Sagamihara	J3 League	28	4	0	0	28	4
Total			174	21	9	0	183	21
