= Danilo (footballer, born 1986) =

Brazilian footballer

Personal information
- Full name: Danilo Vitalino Pereira
- Date of birth: 20 June 1986 (age 40)
- Place of birth: Brazil
- Height: 1.84 m (6 ft 1/2 in)
- Position: Forward

Senior career*
Years	Team	Apps	(Gls)
2010	Linense	8	(2)
2011	RB Brasil	10	(3)
2011	Rio Branco	1	(0)
2012	Rio Verde	14	(5)
2012	Gifu	6	(1)
2014	Água Santa	8	(4)
2015	Inter de Limeira	6	(1)
2017	Flamengo SP	10	(7)
2018	Velo Clube	7	(1)
- * Club domestic league appearances and goals as of 13:28, 15 March 2021 (UTC)

Danilo Vitalino Pereira (born 20 June 1986), known as Danilo, is a Brazilian professional footballer who plays as a forward.

== Honours ==
Linense

- Campeonato Paulista Série A2: 2010

Rio Branco

- Campeonato Acreano: 2011
