= Hideo Yoshizawa (footballer) =

Japanese footballer

Hideo Yoshizawa 吉澤 英生
Personal information
- Full name: Hideo Yoshizawa
- Date of birth: April 10, 1972 (age 54)
- Place of birth: Maebashi, Gunma, Japan
- Position: Defender

Youth career
- 1988–1990: Maebashi Commercial High School

Senior career*
Years	Team	Apps	(Gls)
1991–2001	Honda		

Managerial career
- 2005–2006: Honda
- 2007: FC Ryukyu
- 2008–2011: Matsumoto Yamaga FC
- 2012: Gainare Tottori
- 2021: AC Nagano Parceiro
- * Club domestic league appearances and goals

Hideo Yoshizawa (吉澤 英生, Yoshizawa Hideo; born April 10, 1972) is a Japanese professional football manager and former player who was last the manager of J3 League club AC Nagano Parceiro.

== Playing career ==
Yoshizawa was born in Maebashi on April 10, 1972. After graduating from high school, he played for Honda as defender from 1991 to 2001.

== Coaching career ==
Since 2005, Yoshizawa managed for the Japan Football League clubs Honda and FC Ryukyu as well as the Japanese Regional Leagues club Matsumoto Yamaga FC. In 2012, he became manager for J2 League club Gainare Tottori. In January 2021, he became manager of AC Nagano Parceiro.

== Managerial statistics ==
Team	From	To	Record				
Team	From	To	G	W	D	L	Win %
Gainare Tottori	2012	2012	42	11	5	26	26.19
Total			42	11	5	26	26.19
