= Nobuhisa Urata =

Japanese footballer

Nobuhisa Urata 浦田 延尚
Personal information
- Full name: Nobuhisa Urata
- Date of birth: September 13, 1989 (age 37)
- Place of birth: Shinagawa, Japan
- Height: 1.78 m (5 ft 10 in)
- Position: Defender

Team information
- Current team: ReinMeer Aomori
- Number: 2

Youth career
- 2005–2007: Teikyo High School

Senior career*
Years	Team	Apps	(Gls)
2008–2010	Yokohama F. Marinos	0	(0)
2011	Sagan Tosu	12	(0)
2012–2017	Ehime FC	203	(10)
2018–2021	Matsumoto Yamaga	30	(2)
2021	Ehime FC	12	(0)
2023–	ReinMeer Aomori		
- * Club domestic league appearances and goals as of 28 August 2023

Nobuhisa Urata (浦田 延尚, Urata Nobuhisa; born September 13, 1989) is a Japanese football player who currently plays for ReinMeer Aomori.

== Career statistics ==
Updated to 24 February 2019.

Appearances and goals by club, season and competition
Club	Season	League			Emperor's Cup		J.League Cup		Total	
Club	Season	Division	Apps	Goals	Apps	Goals	Apps	Goals	Apps	Goals
Yokohama F. Marinos	2008	J1 League	0	0	0	0	0	0	0	0
Yokohama F. Marinos	2009	J1 League	0	0	0	0	0	0	0	0
Yokohama F. Marinos	2010	J1 League	0	0	0	0	0	0	0	0
Sagan Tosu	2011	J2 League	12	0	1	0	—		13	0
Ehime FC	2012	J2 League	32	1	0	0	—		32	1
Ehime FC	2013	J2 League	41	3	0	0	—		41	3
Ehime FC	2014	J2 League	23	2	1	0	—		24	2
Ehime FC	2015	J2 League	35	1	3	0	—		38	1
Ehime FC	2016	J2 League	33	0	2	0	—		35	0
Ehime FC	2017	J2 League	37	3	1	0	—		38	3
Matsumoto Yamaga	2018	J2 League	30	2	2	0	—		32	2
Career total			245	12	10	0	0	0	255	12
