= Akito Miura =

Japanese footballer

Akito Miura 三浦 旭人
Personal information
- Full name: Akito Miura
- Date of birth: August 11, 1987 (age 39)
- Place of birth: Osaka, Japan
- Height: 1.67 m (5 ft 5 1/2 in)
- Position: Midfielder

Youth career
- 2003–2005: Yokohama F. Marinos
- 2006–2009: Juntendo University

Senior career*
Years	Team	Apps	(Gls)
2004	Yokohama F. Marinos	0	(0)
2010–2012	Gainare Tottori	48	(0)
2013	FC Ryukyu	13	(0)
2014	Renofa Yamaguchi FC	11	(0)
Total		72	(0)
Medal record
Yokohama F. Marinos
Winner	J1 League	2004
- * Club domestic league appearances and goals

Akito Miura (三浦 旭人, Miura Akito; born August 11, 1987) is a former Japanese football player.

== Career statistics ==
Appearances and goals by club, season and competition
Club	Season	League			Emperor's Cup		J.League Cup		Asia		Total	
Club	Season	Division	Apps	Goals	Apps	Goals	Apps	Goals	Apps	Goals	Apps	Goals
Yokohama F. Marinos	2004	J1 League	0	0	0	0	0	0	1	0	1	0
Gainare Tottori	2010	Football League	9	0	0	0	—		—		9	0
Gainare Tottori	2011	J2 League	14	0	1	0	—		—		15	0
Gainare Tottori	2012	J2 League	25	0	1	0	—		—		26	0
FC Ryukyu	2013	Football League	13	0	1	0	—		—		14	0
Renofa Yamaguchi FC	2014	Football League	11	0	—		—		—		11	0
Career total			72	0	3	0	0	0	1	0	76	0
