= Katsunari Mizumoto =

Japanese footballer

Katsunari Mizumoto 水本勝成
Personal information
- Full name: Katsunari Mizumoto
- Date of birth: February 19, 1990 (age 36)
- Place of birth: Kumamoto, Japan
- Height: 1.80 m (5 ft 11 in)
- Position: Defender

Team information
- Current team: Kagoshima United FC
- Number: 23

Youth career
- 2005–2007: Luther Senior High School

Senior career*
| Years | Team | Apps | (Gls) |
| 2008–2012 | Gainare Tottori | 61 | (1) |
| 2013 | FC Kagoshima | 8 | (3) |
| 2014– | Kagoshima United FC | 118 | (6) |
- * Club domestic league appearances and goals as of 5 January 2019

Katsunari Mizumoto (水本勝成 | born February 19, 1990) is a Japanese football player for Kagoshima United FC.

== Club statistics ==
Updated to 23 February 2018.

| Club performance | | | League | | Cup | | Total | |
| Season | Club | League | Apps | Goals | Apps | Goals | Apps | Goals |
| Japan | | | League | | Emperor's Cup | | Total | |
|---|---|---|---|---|---|---|---|---|
| 2008 | Gainare Tottori | JFL | 7 | 0 | 1 | 0 | 8 | 0 |
| 2009 | Gainare Tottori | JFL | 7 | 0 | 1 | 0 | 8 | 0 |
| 2010 | Gainare Tottori | JFL | 12 | 0 | 1 | 0 | 13 | 0 |
| 2011 | Gainare Tottori | J2 League | 14 | 1 | 1 | 0 | 15 | 1 |
| 2012 | Gainare Tottori | J2 League | 21 | 0 | 0 | 0 | 21 | 0 |
| 2013 | FC Kagoshima | JRL (Kyushu) | 8 | 3 | – | | 8 | 3 |
| 2014 | Kagoshima United FC | JFL | 26 | 0 | 2 | 0 | 28 | 0 |
| 2015 | Kagoshima United FC | JFL | 28 | 2 | 1 | 0 | 29 | 2 |
| 2015 | Kagoshima United FC | J3 League | 26 | 0 | 1 | 0 | 27 | 0 |
| 2015 | Kagoshima United FC | J3 League | 30 | 4 | 2 | 0 | 32 | 4 |
| Total | | | 179 | 10 | 10 | 0 | 189 | 10 |
