= Eijiro Mori =

Japanese footballer

Personal information
- Full name: Eijiro Mori
- Date of birth: April 8, 1986 (age 40)
- Place of birth: Kanagawa, Japan
- Height: 1.73 m (5 ft 8 in)
- Position: Defender

Youth career
- 2005–2008: Juntendo University

Senior career*
Years	Team	Apps	(Gls)
2009–2014	Gainare Tottori	146	(9)
2015–2017	Grulla Morioka	63	(2)
- * Club domestic league appearances and goals as of 2 February 2018

Eijiro Mori (森 英次郎, Mori Eijirō; born April 8, 1986) is a former Japanese football player.

== Club statistics ==
Updated to 2 February 2018.

Club performance			League		Cup		Other		Total	
Season	Club	League	Apps	Goals	Apps	Goals	Apps	Goals	Apps	Goals
Japan			League		Emperor's Cup		Other^{1}		Total	
2009	Gainare Tottori	JFL	32	3	1	0	-		33	3
2010	Gainare Tottori	JFL	4	0	0	0	-		4	0
2011	Gainare Tottori	J2 League	6	1	0	0	-		6	1
2012	Gainare Tottori	J2 League	34	2	2	0	-		36	2
2013	Gainare Tottori	J2 League	37	0	1	0	2	1	40	1
2014	Gainare Tottori	J3 League	33	3	2	1	-		35	4
2015	Grulla Morioka	J3 League	35	0	0	0	-		35	0
2016	Grulla Morioka	J3 League	19	2	1	0	-		20	2
2017	Grulla Morioka	J3 League	9	0	1	0	-		10	0
Total			209	11	8	1	2	1	219	13

^{1}Includes JFL/J2 Playoff.
