= Toshitaka Tsurumi =

Japanese footballer

Personal information
- Full name: Toshitaka Tsurumi
- Date of birth: December 22, 1986 (age 39)
- Place of birth: Fujisawa, Kanagawa, Japan
- Height: 1.71 m (5 ft 7 1/2 in)
- Position: Midfielder

Team information
- Current team: Maruyasu Okazaki
- Number: 10

Youth career
- 2002–2004: Shonan Bellmare

Senior career*
Years	Team	Apps	(Gls)
2005–2007	Shonan Bellmare	5	(0)
2007–2013	Gainare Tottori	137	(26)
2014–2015	Nara Club	40	(8)
2016–	Maruyasu Okazaki		
Total		182	(34)
- * Club domestic league appearances and goals as of December 31, 2015

Toshitaka Tsurumi (鶴見 聡貴, Tsurumi Toshitaka; born December 22, 1986) is a Japanese football player. He plays for Maruyasu Okazaki.

Tsurumi previously played for Shonan Bellmare in the J2 League.

== Career statistics ==
Appearances and goals by club, season and competition
Club	Season	League			Emperor's Cup		Total	
Club	Season	Division	Apps	Goals	Apps	Goals	Apps	Goals
Shonan Bellmare	2005	J2 League	0	0	0	0	0	0
Shonan Bellmare	2006	J2 League	5	0	1	0	6	0
Shonan Bellmare	2007	J2 League	0	0	0	0	0	0
Gainare Tottori	2007	Football League	26	7	2	0	28	7
Gainare Tottori	2008	Football League	13	3	1	0	14	3
Gainare Tottori	2009	Football League	32	11	0	0	32	11
Gainare Tottori	2010	Football League	10	2	1	0	11	2
Gainare Tottori	2011	J2 League	16	0	0	0	16	0
Gainare Tottori	2012	J2 League	29	3	1	0	30	3
Gainare Tottori	2013	J2 League	11	0	0	0	11	0
Nara Club	2014	Regional Leagues	14	5	3	1	17	6
Nara Club	2015	Football League						
Career total			156	31	9	1	165	32
