= Shota Koide =

Japanese footballer

Shota Koide 小井手 翔太
Personal information
- Full name: Shota Koide
- Date of birth: September 29, 1981 (age 45)
- Place of birth: Fukuoka, Fukuoka, Japan
- Height: 1.73 m (5 ft 8 in)
- Position: Midfielder

Youth career
- 1997–1999: Tokai University Daigo High School
- 2000–2003: Fukuoka University

Senior career*
Years	Team	Apps	(Gls)
2004–2007	Sagan Tosu	50	(1)
2008–2012	Gainare Tottori	143	(19)
2013–2014	Nakhon Ratchasima		
2015	Grulla Morioka	17	(0)
2016–2017	Nara Club	33	(2)
Total		243	(22)
- * Club domestic league appearances and goals

Shota Koide (小井手 翔太, Koide Shota; born September 29, 1981) is a former Japanese football player.

== Club statistics ==
Updated to 20 February 2017.

Club performance			League		Cup		Total	
Season	Club	League	Apps	Goals	Apps	Goals	Apps	Goals
Japan			League		Emperor's Cup		Total	
2004	Sagan Tosu	J2 League	15	0	1	0	16	0
2005	Sagan Tosu	J2 League	12	1	0	0	12	1
2006	Sagan Tosu	J2 League	6	0	1	1	7	1
2007	Sagan Tosu	J2 League	17	0	0	0	17	0
2008	Gainare Tottori	JFL	24	3	1	0	25	3
2009	Gainare Tottori	JFL	21	2	0	0	21	2
2010	Gainare Tottori	JFL	27	8	1	0	28	8
2011	Gainare Tottori	J2 League	34	2	1	0	35	2
2012	Gainare Tottori	J2 League	37	4	1	0	38	4
2015	Grulla Morioka	J3 League	17	0	0	0	17	0
2016	Nara Club	JFL	23	1	1	0	24	1
Career total			233	21	7	1	240	22
