= Takuya Sonoda =

Japanese footballer

Takuya Sonoda 園田 拓也
Personal information
- Full name: Takuya Sonoda
- Date of birth: November 23, 1984 (age 41)
- Place of birth: Miyazaki, Japan
- Height: 1.80 m (5 ft 11 in)
- Position: Defender

Team information
- Current team: FC Imabari
- Number: 4

Youth career
- 2000–2002: Kunimi High School
- 2003–2006: Chuo University

Senior career*
Years	Team	Apps	(Gls)
2007–2011	Montedio Yamagata	57	(1)
2012–2013	Ehime FC	54	(1)
2014–2018	Roasso Kumamoto	164	(7)
2019–	FC Imabari	0	(0)
- * Club domestic league appearances and goals as of 24 January 2019

Takuya Sonoda (園田 拓也, Sonoda Takuya; born November 23, 1984 in Miyazaki) is a Japanese footballer who plays for FC Imabari, as a defender.

== Career ==
=== FC Imabari ===
On 16 December 2018, FC Imabari announced the signing of Sonoda.

== Career statistics ==
Updated to 23 December 2018.

Club performance			League		Cup		League Cup		Total	
Season	Club	League	Apps	Goals	Apps	Goals	Apps	Goals	Apps	Goals
Japan			League		Emperor's Cup		League Cup		Total	
2007	Montedio Yamagata	J2 League	11	0	1	0	-		12	0
2008	Montedio Yamagata	J2 League	9	1	1	0	-		10	1
2009	Montedio Yamagata	J1 League	8	0	0	0	3	0	11	0
2010	Montedio Yamagata	J1 League	13	0	2	0	3	0	18	0
2011	Montedio Yamagata	J1 League	16	0	2	0	2	0	20	0
2012	Ehime FC	J2 League	32	0	1	0	-		33	0
2013	Ehime FC	J2 League	22	1	1	0	-		23	1
2014	Roasso Kumamoto	J2 League	41	6	1	0	-		42	6
2015	Roasso Kumamoto	J2 League	36	0	1	0	-		37	0
2016	Roasso Kumamoto	J2 League	38	0	1	0	-		39	0
2017	Roasso Kumamoto	J2 League	32	0	0	0	-		32	0
2018	Roasso Kumamoto	J2 League	17	1	0	0	-		17	1
Career total			275	9	10	0	8	0	293	9
