= Takahiko Sumida =

Japanese footballer

Personal information
- Full name: Takahiko Sumida
- Date of birth: March 12, 1991 (age 35)
- Place of birth: Yonago, Tottori, Japan
- Height: 1.78 m (5 ft 10 in)
- Position: Forward

Senior career*
Years	Team	Apps	(Gls)
2009–2010	Oita Trinita	7	(0)
2010–2014	Gainare Tottori	100	(7)
2015	Grulla Morioka	17	(1)
Total		124	(8)
- * Club domestic league appearances and goals

Takahiko Sumida (住田 貴彦, Sumida Takahiko; born March 12, 1991) is a former Japanese football player.

== Career statistics ==
Appearances and goals by club, season and competition
Club	Season	League			Emperor's Cup		J.League Cup		Total	
Club	Season	Division	Apps	Goals	Apps	Goals	Apps	Goals	Apps	Goals
Oita Trinita	2009	J1 League	2	0	0	0	0	0	2	0
Oita Trinita	2010	J2 League	5	0	-		-		5	0
Gainare Tottori	2010	Football League	7	0	1	0	-		8	0
Gainare Tottori	2011	J2 League					-			
Career total			14	0	1	0	0	0	15	0
