= Akihiro Noda =

Japanese footballer

Akihiro Noda 野田 明弘
Personal information
- Full name: Akihiro Noda
- Date of birth: September 5, 1988 (age 38)
- Place of birth: Isahaya, Nagasaki, Japan
- Height: 1.71 m (5 ft 7 1/2 in)
- Position: Right back

Youth career
- 2007–2010: Waseda University

Senior career*
Years	Team	Apps	(Gls)
2011–2012	FC Gifu	63	(0)
2013–2016	Fukushima United FC	106	(0)
- * Club domestic league appearances and goals as of 14 February 2017

Akihiro Noda (野田 明弘, Noda Akihiro; born September 5, 1988) is a Japanese football player.

== Career statistics ==
Updated to 14 February 2017.

Appearances and goals by club, season and competition
Club	Season	League			Emperor's Cup		Total	
Club	Season	Division	Apps	Goals	Apps	Goals	Apps	Goals
FC Gifu	2011	J2 League	37	0	1	0	38	0
FC Gifu	2012	J2 League	26	0	0	0	26	0
Fukushima United FC	2013	JFL	30	0	2	0	32	0
Fukushima United FC	2014	J3 League	30	0	1	0	31	0
Fukushima United FC	2015	J3 League	27	0	1	0	28	0
Fukushima United FC	2016	J3 League	19	0	1	0	20	0
Career total			169	0	6	0	175	0
