= Hiroshi Azuma =

Japanese football player

Hiroshi Azuma 東 浩史
Personal information
- Full name: Hiroshi Azuma
- Date of birth: May 15, 1987 (age 39)
- Place of birth: Sendai, Japan
- Height: 1.68 m (5 ft 6 in)
- Position: Attacking midfielder

Team information
- Current team: Nagano Parceiro
- Number: 10

Youth career
- 2006–2009: Hannan University

Senior career*
Years	Team	Apps	(Gls)
2010–2013	Ehime FC	74	(11)
2014–2015	V-Varen Nagasaki	54	(7)
2016–	Nagano Parceiro	159	(19)
- * Club domestic league appearances and goals as of January 1st, 2022

Hiroshi Azuma (東 浩史, Azuma Hiroshi; born May 15, 1987) is a Japanese football player who plays for AC Nagano Parceiro in J3 League.

== Club statistics ==
Updated to January 1st, 2022.

Club performance			League		Cup		Total	
Season	Club	League	Apps	Goals	Apps	Goals	Apps	Goals
Japan			League		Emperor's Cup		Total	
2010	Ehime FC	J2 League	0	0	0	0	0	0
2011	Ehime FC	J2 League	17	3	3	0	20	3
2012	Ehime FC	J2 League	25	3	1	0	26	3
2013	Ehime FC	J2 League	32	5	0	0	32	5
2014	V-Varen Nagasaki	J2 League	32	5	2	1	34	6
2015	V-Varen Nagasaki	J2 League	22	2	1	0	23	2
2016	Nagano Parceiro	J3 League	29	1	1	0	30	1
2017	Nagano Parceiro	J3 League	30	4	1	0	31	4
2018	Nagano Parceiro	J3 League	29	4	0	0	29	4
2019	Nagano Parceiro	J3 League	26	4	1	0	27	4
2020	Nagano Parceiro	J3 League	24	4	–		24	4
2021	Nagano Parceiro	J3 League	21	2	2	0	23	2
Total			258	36	11	1	269	37
