= Michitaka Akimoto =

Japanese football player

Personal information
- Full name: Michitaka Akimoto
- Date of birth: September 24, 1982 (age 44)
- Place of birth: Shizuoka, Japan
- Height: 1.80 m (5 ft 11 in)
- Position: Defender

Team information
- Current team: Thai Honda Ladkrabang
- Number: 5

Youth career
- 1998–2000: Shimizu Shogyo High School

College career
Years	Team	Apps	(Gls)
2001–2004	Hosei University		

Senior career*
Years	Team	Apps	(Gls)
2005–2010	Ventforet Kofu	151	(19)
2011–2013	Kyoto Sanga FC	80	(6)
2014	Kataller Toyama	30	(3)
2015–2018	Thai Honda Ladkrabang	69	(8)
2019–	Fujieda MYFC	20	(2)
Medal record
Kyoto Sanga FC
Runner-up	Emperor's Cup	2011
- * Club domestic league appearances and goals as of 01:03, 5 February 2018 (UTC)

Michitaka Akimoto (秋本 倫孝, Akimoto Michitaka; born September 24, 1982) is a Japanese football player.

== Career statistics ==
Appearances and goals by club, season and competition
Club	Season	League			Emperor's Cup		J.League Cup		Total	
Club	Season	Division	Apps	Goals	Apps	Goals	Apps	Goals	Apps	Goals
Ventforet Kofu	2005	J2 League	13	1	1	0	—		14	1
Ventforet Kofu	2006	J1 League	18	1	2	0	4	0	24	1
Ventforet Kofu	2007	J1 League	27	3	2	0	7	1	36	4
Ventforet Kofu	2008	J2 League	30	4	2	0	—		32	4
Ventforet Kofu	2009	J2 League	31	3	2	0	—		33	3
Ventforet Kofu	2010	J2 League	32	7	2	0	—		34	7
Kyoto Sanga FC	2011	J2 League	25	3	4	0	—		29	3
Kyoto Sanga FC	2012	J2 League	22	2	0	0	—		22	2
Kyoto Sanga FC	2013	J2 League	33	1	1	0	—		34	1
Kataller Toyama	2014	J2 League					—			
Career total			231	25	16	0	11	1	258	26

== Honour ==
Thai Honda FC

Thai Division 1 League Champion; 2016
