= Taira Inoue =

Japanese footballer

Personal information
- Full name: Taira Inoue
- Date of birth: 11 April 1983 (age 43)
- Place of birth: Hachiōji, Tokyo, Japan
- Height: 1.75 m (5 ft 9 in)
- Positions: Striker; midfielder

Team information
- Current team: SC Sagamihara
- Number: 7

Youth career
- –2006: Hosei University

Senior career*
Years	Team	Apps	(Gls)
2007–2011	Tokyo Verdy	61	(8)
2012–2014	FC Gifu	48	(2)
2015–	SC Sagamihara	33	(8)
- * Club domestic league appearances and goals as of 14 February 2016

Taira Inoue (井上 平, Inoue Taira; born 11 April 1983, in Tokyo) is a Japanese footballer.

== Career statistics ==
Appearances and goals by club, season and competition
Club	Season	League			Emperor's Cup		J.League Cup		Total	
Club	Season	Division	Apps	Goals	Apps	Goals	Apps	Goals	Apps	Goals
Tokyo Verdy	2007	J.League 2	12	0	1	0	—		13	0
Tokyo Verdy	2008	J.League 1	3	0	0	0	3	0	6	0
Tokyo Verdy	2009	J.League 2	15	5	0	0	—		15	5
Tokyo Verdy	2010	J.League 2	21	0	1	0	—		22	0
Tokyo Verdy	2011	J.League 2	10	3	1	0	—		11	3
FC Gifu	2012	J.League 2	42	2	1	0	—		43	2
FC Gifu	2013	J.League 2	3	0	0	0	—		3	0
FC Gifu	2014	J.League 2	3	0	0	0	—		3	0
SC Sagamihara	2015	J3 League	33	8	0	0	—		33	8
SC Sagamihara	2016	J3 League	0	0	0	0	—		0	0
Career total			142	18	4	0	3	0	149	18
