= Koki Arita =

Japanese football player

Koki Arita 有田 光希
Personal information
- Full name: Koki Arita
- Date of birth: 23 September 1991 (age 35)
- Place of birth: Niigata, Japan
- Height: 1.80 m (5 ft 11 in)
- Position: Forward

Team information
- Current team: Kagoshima United
- Number: 9

Youth career
- 2007–2009: Hokuetsu High School

Senior career*
Years	Team	Apps	(Gls)
2010–2013	Vissel Kobe	20	(2)
2012	→ Ehime FC (loan)	37	(14)
2014–2016	Kyoto Sanga	83	(11)
2017–2021	Ehime FC	135	(20)
2021	Ventforet Kofu	16	(1)
2022–	Kagoshima United	51	(16)
- * Club domestic league appearances and goals as of 17:07, 5 January 2024

Koki Arita (有田 光希, born 23 September 1991) is a Japanese football player who currently plays for Kagoshima United.

== Early life ==
Koki was born in Niigata. He played youth football for Hokuetsu High School.

== Career ==
Koki made his debut for Vissel against Shimizu S-Pulse on the 20 March 2010. He scored a brace against Ehime on the 19 May 2013, scoring in the 70 and 74th minutes.

Koki made his debut for Ehime against FC Machida Zelvia on the 4 March 2012. He scored his first goal for the club against Tochigi SC on the 25 March 2012, scoring in the 60th minute.

Koki made his debut for Kyoto against Avispa Fukuoka on the 9 March 2014. He scored his first goal for the club against Gifu on the 1 June 2014, scoring in the 90th minute.

Koki made his debut for Ehime against Zweigen Kanazawa on the 26 February 2017. Koki scored his first goal for the club against Fagiano Okayama on the 17 May 2017, scoring in the 89th minute.

Koki made his debut for Ventforet against JEF United Chiba on the 28 February 2021. He scored his first goal for the club against Fagiano Okayama on the 3 July 2021, scoring a penalty in the 82nd minute.

Koki scored on his debut for Kagoshima, scoring against Iwaki FC in the 42nd minute on the 13 March 2022.

== Career statistics ==
=== Club ===
Updated to end of 2018 season.

Club	Season	League		Emperor's Cup		J. League Cup		Total	
Club	Season	Apps	Goals	Apps	Goals	Apps	Goals	Apps	Goals
Vissel Kobe	2010	1	0	0	0	0	0	1	0
Vissel Kobe	2011	10	0	0	0	1	0	11	0
Ehime FC	2012	37	14	0	0	-		37	14
Vissel Kobe	2013	9	2	1	0	-		10	2
Kyoto Sanga	2014	15	1	1	0	-		16	1
Kyoto Sanga	2015	37	5	2	1	-		38	6
Kyoto Sanga	2016	31	5	1	1	-		32	6
Ehime FC	2017	34	7	1	1	-		35	8
Ehime FC	2018	35	5	0	0	-		35	5
Career total		209	39	6	3	1	0	216	42

== Honours ==
Vissel Kobe

- J2 League 2013 (runners-up)

Kagoshima United

- J3 League 2023 (runners-up)
