= Shuichi Akai (footballer) =

Japanese footballer

Shuichi Akai 赤井 秀一
Personal information
- Full name: Shuichi Akai
- Date of birth: September 2, 1981 (age 45)
- Place of birth: Sapporo, Japan
- Height: 1.73 m (5 ft 8 in)
- Position: Midfielder

Youth career
- 2000–2003: Sendai University

Senior career*
Years	Team	Apps	(Gls)
2004–2013	Ehime FC	324	(35)
2014–2015	FC Imabari		
- * Club domestic league appearances and goals as of 23 February 2016

Shuichi Akai (赤井 秀一, Akai Shūichi; born September 2, 1981) is a former Japanese football player. he currently assistant manager J3 League club of Ehime FC

== Club statistics ==
Updated to 23 February 2016.

Club performance			League		Cup		Total	
Season	Club	League	Apps	Goals	Apps	Goals	Apps	Goals
Japan			League		Emperor's Cup		Total	
2004	Ehime FC	JFL	27	3	0	0	27	3
2005	Ehime FC	JFL	21	1	3	1	24	2
2006	Ehime FC	J2 League	29	2	2	0	31	2
2007	Ehime FC	J2 League	46	3	4	0	50	3
2008	Ehime FC	J2 League	41	4	2	0	43	4
2009	Ehime FC	J2 League	50	10	1	0	51	10
2010	Ehime FC	J2 League	35	4	0	0	35	4
2011	Ehime FC	J2 League	14	1	1	0	15	1
2012	Ehime FC	J2 League	36	5	1	0	37	5
2013	Ehime FC	J2 League	25	2	1	0	26	2
Total			324	35	15	1	339	36
