= Daiki Tamori =

Japanese footballer

Daiki Tamori 田森大己
Personal information
- Full name: Daiki Tamori
- Date of birth: 5 August 1983 (age 43)
- Place of birth: Shōbara, Hiroshima, Japan
- Height: 1.79 m (5 ft 10 in)
- Position: Midfielder

Youth career
- 1999–2001: Sanfrecce Hiroshima Youth
- 2002–2005: Hosei University

Senior career*
Years	Team	Apps	(Gls)
2006–2008	Ventforet Kofu	14	(0)
2009–2012	Ehime FC	98	(2)
2013–2015	Kyoto Sanga	61	(1)
2016–2018	FC Gifu	86	(2)
- * Club domestic league appearances and goals as of 31 December 2018

Daiki Tamori (田森 大己, Tamori Daiki; born 5 August 1983 in Shōbara, Hiroshima) is a Japanese football manager and former player.

== Career statistics ==
Updated to 31 December 2018.

Appearances and goals by club, season and competition
Club	Season	League			Emperor's Cup		J.League Cup		Total	
Club	Season	Division	Apps	Goals	Apps	Goals	Apps	Goals	Apps	Goals
Ventforet Kofu	2006	J1 League	0	0	0	0	0	0	0	0
Ventforet Kofu	2007	J1 League	9	0	1	0	2	0	12	0
Ventforet Kofu	2008	J2 League	5	0	0	0	—		5	0
Ehime FC	2009	J2 League	24	1	1	0	—		25	1
Ehime FC	2010	J2 League	22	0	0	0	—		0	0
Ehime FC	2011	J2 League	25	1	3	0	—		0	0
Ehime FC	2012	J2 League	27	0	1	0	—		0	0
Kyoto Sanga	2013	J2 League	18	0	1	0	—		0	0
Kyoto Sanga	2014	J2 League	26	1	1	0	—		0	0
Kyoto Sanga	2015	J2 League	17	0	2	0	—		0	0
FC Gifu	2016	J2 League	23	1	0	0	—		23	1
FC Gifu	2017	J2 League	32	1	2	0	—		34	1
FC Gifu	2018	J2 League	31	0	1	0	—		32	0
Career total			259	5	13	0	2	0	274	5
