= 2012 Giravanz Kitakyushu season =

Giravanz Kitakyushu
2012 season
- Manager: Yasutoshi Miura
- J.League Division 2: -
- Emperor's Cup: -
Home colours	Away colours

The 2012 Giravanz Kitakyushu season sees Giravanz Kitakyushu compete in J.League Division 2 for the fourth consecutive season. Giravanz Kitakyushu are also competing in the 2012 Emperor's Cup.

== Competitions ==
=== J. League ===
==== League table ====
Pos	Team	Pld	W	D	L	GF	GA	GD	Pts
7	Tokyo Verdy	42	20	6	16	65	46	+19	66
8	Fagiano Okayama	42	17	14	11	41	34	+7	65
9	Giravanz Kitakyushu	42	19	7	16	53	47	+6	64
10	Montedio Yamagata	42	16	13	13	51	49	+2	61
11	Tochigi SC	42	17	9	16	50	49	+1	60

Updated to match(es) played on 11 November 2012. Source: J.League Division 2
Rules for classification: 1st points; 2nd goal differential; 3rd goals scored; 4th head-to-head results; 5th disciplinary points; 6th draw. If two clubs are tied for first place, both clubs will be declared champions.

==== Matches ====
4 March 2012 1	Giravanz Kitakyushu	1 - 2	Tokushima Vortis	Honjo Stadium
Sunday 17:34	Hanato 70'	Report	64' Kim; 87' Tsuda	Attendance: 3,160; Referee: Ikeuchi

11 March 2012 2	Giravanz Kitakyushu	0 - 0	Fagiano Okayama	Honjo Stadium
Sunday 13:03		Report		Attendance: 4,009; Referee: Ogawa

17 March 2012 3	Matsumoto Yamaga	1 - 0	Giravanz Kitakyushu	Matsumotodaira Park Stadium Alwin
Saturday 14:04	Iida 19'	Report		Attendance: 4,471; Referee: Oka

20 March 2012 4	Giravanz Kitakyushu	1 - 0	Mito HollyHock	Honjo Stadium
Tuesday 16:03	Watari 51'	Report		Attendance: 2,558; Referee: Ueda

25 March 2012 5	Kataller Toyama	2 - 3	Giravanz Kitakyushu	Toyama Stadium
Sunday 13:04	Nishikawa 45+2'; Kurobe 50'	Report	48' Ikemoto; 66' Watari; 85' Hanato	Attendance: 1,692; Referee: Koya

1 April 2012 6	Ventforet Kofu	1 - 2	Giravanz Kitakyushu	Yamanashi Chuo Bank Stadium
Sunday 16:03	Yamamoto 78'	Report	65' Noborio; 86' Takeuchi	Attendance: 9,486; Referee: Enomoto

8 April 2012 7	Giravanz Kitakyushu	1 - 0	Gainare Tottori	Honjo Stadium
14:00 JST	Watari 62'	Report	Kumazawa (yellow card) 26'	Attendance: 3,230; Referee: (Japan) Hiroyuki Onishi

15 April 2012 8	Gifu	1 - 0	Giravanz Kitakyushu	Gifu Nagaragawa Stadium
16:00 JST	Hirota 55'; Kim Jung-Hyun (yellow card) 90+2'	Report	Arai (yellow card) 39'; Kimura (yellow card) 70'; Miyamoto (yellow card) 77'	Attendance: 2,920; Referee: (Japan) Kazuyuki Hayakawa

22 April 2012 9	Giravanz Kitakyushu	0 - 1	Montedio Yamagata	Honjo Stadium
14:00 JST	Miyamoto (yellow card) 15'	Report	Miyasaka 20'; Bandai (yellow card) 60'; Higa (yellow card) 80'	Attendance: 3,286; Referee: (Japan) Kenji Ogiya

27 April 2012 10	Thespa Kusatsu	0 - 2	Giravanz Kitakyushu	Shoda Shoyu Stadium Gunma
20:00 JST	Nagata (yellow card) 52'	Report	Watari 16'; Ikemoto (yellow card) 45+3'; Kimura 64'; Arai (yellow card) 71'; Hanato (yellow card) 90+1'	Attendance: 1,447; Referee: (Japan) Koji Murakami

30 April 2012 11	Giravanz Kitakyushu	1 - 2	JEF United Ichihara Chiba	Honjo Stadium
16:00 JST	Watari 9'	Report	Ito 34'; Milligan 63'	Attendance: 2,112; Referee: (Japan) Hiroshi Yamaguchi

3 May 2012 12	Machida Zelvia	0 - 1	Giravanz Kitakyushu	Machida Athletic Stadium
20:00 JST	Tsuda (yellow card) 76'	Report	Fuji (yellow card) 11'; Ikemoto 77' (pen.); Miyamoto (yellow card) 90+1'	Attendance: 3,021; Referee: (Japan) Yosuke Kubota

6 May 2012 13	Giravanz Kitakyushu	1 - 2	Yokohama	Honjo Stadium
20:00 JST	Tada (yellow card) 6'; Ikemoto 71'	Report	Nakazato (yellow card) 7'; Fujita 19', 47'; Abe (yellow card) 30'; Schneider (yellow card) 44'; Sugiyama (yellow card) 69'	Attendance: 3,702; Referee: (Japan) Hiromichi Oka

12 May 2012 14	Ehime	2 - 2	Giravanz Kitakyushu	Ningineer Stadium
15:00 JST	Oyama 2'; Takumi Murakami (yellow card) 9'; Ogasawara (yellow card) 79'; Arita 87' (yellow card) 90+2'	Report	Shuto Nakahara 6'; Yasuda (yellow card) 31'; Hanato (yellow card) 32'; Ikemoto (yellow card) 34'; Komorida (yellow card) 54' (goal) 57'; Miyamoto (yellow card) 60'	Attendance: 3,724; Referee: (Japan) Minoru Tojo

20 May 2012 15	Giravanz Kitakyushu	1 - 5	Tokyo Verdy	Honjo Stadium
14:00 JST	Takano (yellow card) 17'; Kim Jong-pil (yellow card) 47'; Komorida 52' (yellow card) 58'	Report	Fukatsu (yellow card) 5' (goal) 50'; Abe 19' (pen.), 79'; Nishi 25'; Takahashi (yellow card) 60'; Maki 82'	Attendance: 3,491; Referee: (Japan) Masuya Ueda

26 May 2012 16	Kyoto Sanga	1 - 0	Giravanz Kitakyushu	Nishikyogoku Athletic Stadium
14:00 JST	Nakamura 37'; Nakayama (yellow card) 81' (yellow-red card) 86'	Report	Kim Jong-pil (yellow card) 65'; Komorida (yellow card) 72'	Attendance: 6,540; Referee: (Japan) Yuichi Nishimura

2 June 2012 17	Giravanz Kitakyushu	3 - 2	Shonan Bellmare	Honjo Stadium
14:00 JST	Miyamoto (yellow card) 8'; Yasuda (yellow card) 42' (goal) 81'; Tokiwa 46'; Abe 60' (o.g.)	Report	Alex (yellow card) 24'; Kikuchi 53'; Han Kook-Young (yellow card) 63'; Yamaguchi (yellow card) 73'; Kamata (yellow card) 79'; Yoshihama 87'; Furuhashi (yellow card) 90+4'	Attendance: 2,677; Referee: (Japan) Tetsuro Yoshida

9 June 2012 18	Avispa Fukuoka	1 - 0	Giravanz Kitakyushu	Level-5 Stadium
14:00 JST	Omata (yellow card) 26'; Jogo 41'; Koga (yellow card) 57'; Suzuki (yellow card) 83'; Naruoka (yellow card) 90+3'	Report	Kimura (yellow card) 16'	Attendance: 8,741; Referee: (Japan) Shoichiro Mikami

13 June 2012 19	Giravanz Kitakyushu	1 - 1	Tochigi S.C.	Honjo Stadium
20:00 JST	Komorida (yellow card) 15'; Morimura (yellow card) 16'; Killoran 24'; Seki (yellow card) 45'; Tokiwa (yellow card) 68'; Kimura (yellow card) 78'; Leonardo (yellow card) 88'	Report	Onodera (yellow card) 11'; Takagi 39'; Usami (red card) 78'	Attendance: 2,391; Referee: (Japan) Nobutsugu Murakami

17 June 2012 20	Roasso Kumamoto	2 - 2	Giravanz Kitakyushu	Kumamoto Athletics Stadium
20:00 JST	Saito 3' (yellow card) 27'; Taketomi (yellow card) 22' (goal) 79'	Report	Nagano (yellow card) 6'; Hanato 23', 29' (yellow card) 78'; Fuji (yellow card) 90+1'	Attendance: 4,572; Referee: (Japan) Akihiko Ikeuchi

24 June 2012 21	Giravanz Kitakyushu	0 - 2	Oita Trinita	Honjo Stadium
19:00 JST	Ikemoto (yellow card) 42'; Tokiwa (yellow card) 52'; Komorida (yellow card) 82'	Report	Mitsuhira 11'; Morishima 35' (yellow card) 74'	Attendance: 2,129; Referee: (Japan) Hiroshi Yamauchi

1 July 2012 22	Gainare Tottori	1 - 2	Giravanz Kitakyushu	Tottori Bank Bird Stadium
19:00 JST	Togawa 4'; Fukui (yellow card) 6' (yellow-red card) 29'	Report	Leonardo 33', 43' (yellow card) 68'; Fuji (yellow card) 36' (yellow-red card) 68'; Ikemoto (yellow card) 49'; Tada (yellow card) 80'; Oshima (yellow card) 88'; Seki (yellow card) 90'	Attendance: 2,313; Referee: (Japan) Hiromichi Oka

8 July 2012 23	Giravanz Kitakyushu	2 - 0	Ehime	Honjo Stadium
19:00 JST	Hanato 15' (pen.) (yellow card) 41'; Killoran (yellow card) 27' (goal) 51'	Report	Alair (yellow card) 11'; Akimoto (yellow card) 15'; Tomić (yellow card) 19' (yellow-red card) 25'	Attendance: 2,389; Referee: (Japan) Hiroyuki Onishi

15 July 2012 24	Giravanz Kitakyushu	0 - 1	Thespa Kusatsu	Honjo Stadium
19:00 JST		Report	Tatsushi Koyanagi (yellow card) 19'; Matsushita (yellow card) 26'; Nakamura 90+5'	Attendance: 2,894; Referee: (Japan) Kazuyuki Hayakawa

22 July 2012 25	Tokushima Vortis	1 - 1	Giravanz Kitakyushu	Pocarisweat Stadium
19:30 JST	Diogo 85'	Report	Hanato 53'; Miyamoto (yellow card) 90'	Attendance: 5,021; Referee: (Japan) Masuya Ueda

29 July 2012 26	Shonan Bellmare	1 - 0	Giravanz Kitakyushu	Shonan BMW Stadium Hiratsuka
19:30 JST	Furuhashi 47'; Kaoru Takayama (yellow card) 53'; Abe (yellow card) 67'; Macena (yellow card) 90+3'	Report	Arai (yellow card) 87'	Attendance: 6,334; Referee: (Japan) Tomohiro Tsukada

5 August 2012 27	Giravanz Kitakyushu	1 - 1	Machida Zelvia	Honjo Stadium
19:00 JST	Komorida (yellow card) 29' (yellow-red card) 64'; Tada 83'	Report	Suzuki 2'; Fujita (yellow card) 90+2'	Attendance: 2,384; Referee: (Japan) Koichiro Fukushima

12 August 2012 28	Oita Trinita	0 - 1	Giravanz Kitakyushu	Ōita Bank Dome
19:00 JST		Summary	Tada (yellow card) 18'; Morimura (yellow card) 23' (yellow-red card) 41'; Kawanabe (yellow card) 64'; Ikemoto 83'; Satō (yellow card) 90+2'	Attendance: 8,941; Referee: (Japan) Tetsuro Yoshida

19 August 2012 29	Giravanz Kitakyushu	4 - 2	Avispa Fukuoka	Honjo Stadium
19:00 JST	Ikemoto 8'; Hanato 15', 56' (yellow card) 90+4'; Tokiwa 90+4'	Summary	Jogo (yellow card) 7' (goal) 45+1'; Wada (yellow card) 85'; Suzuki 90+2'	Attendance: 7,637; Referee: (Japan) Ryuji Sato

22 August 2012 30	Fagiano Okayama	1 - 1	Giravanz Kitakyushu	Kanko Stadium
20:00 JST	Sengoku 42'; Ueda (yellow card) 57'	Summary	Arai 19'; Oshima (yellow card) 40'; Satō (yellow card) 62'; Kimura (yellow card) 84'; Kim Jong-pil (yellow card) 90+2'	Attendance: 8,172; Referee: (Japan) Koei Koya

26 August 2012 31	Tokyo Verdy	0 - 2	Giravanz Kitakyushu	Ajinomoto Stadium
19:00 JST	Shibasaki (yellow card) 75'	Summary	Tokiwa 40'; Tada (yellow card) 58'; Hayashi 89'	Attendance: 3,088; Referee: (Japan) Hiroyoshi Takayama

2 September 2012 32	Giravanz Kitakyushu	2 - 0	Roasso Kumamoto	Honjo Stadium
19:00 JST	Ikemoto 35'; Killoran (yellow card) 58'; Hanato 79'	Summary	Fujimoto (yellow card) 8'; Hiroi (yellow card) 58'; Yano (yellow card) 90+2'	Attendance: 4,794; Referee: (Japan) Hiroyuki Onishi

14 September 2012 33	Giravanz Kitakyushu	2 - 1	Gifu	Honjo Stadium
20:00 JST	Ikemoto 6'; Hanato 63'; Yasuda (yellow card) 74'; Arai (yellow card) 90+3'	Summary	Ri Han-Jae (yellow card) 44'; Abuda (yellow card) 76'; Hiroki Higuchi	Attendance: 2,853; Referee: (Japan) Hiromichi Oka

17 September 2012 34	JEF United Ichihara Chiba	0 - 3	Giravanz Kitakyushu	Fukuda Denshi Arena
14:00 JST	Aoki (red card) 6'; Yazawa (yellow card) 51'	Summary	Hanato 3', 35'; Killoran 8'; Shingo Suzuki (yellow card) 59'; Kim Jong-pil (yellow card) 67'	Attendance: 7,845; Referee: (Japan) Kazuyoshi Enomoto

23 September 2012 35	Giravanz Kitakyushu	2 - 3	Ventforet Kofu	Honjo Stadium
14:00 JST	Arai (yellow card) 14'; Kim Jong-pil 48' (yellow card) 65'; Miyamoto (yellow card) 59'; Yasuda (yellow card) 70'; Tokiwa 77'	Summary	Kashiwa 6' (yellow card) 36'; Davi (yellow card) 82' (goal) 85'; Hatada 90+3'	Attendance: 3,254; Referee: (Japan) Ryuji Sato

30 September 2012 36	Mito HollyHock	3 - 1	Giravanz Kitakyushu	K's denki Stadium Mito
14:00 JST	Okamoto 3', 35'; Shimada 16'; Omoto (yellow card) 58'	Summary	Tokiwa 7'; Killoran (yellow card) 20'; Kim Jong-pil (yellow card) 77'	Attendance: 6,023; Referee: (Japan) Koji Morikawa

7 October 2012 37	Giravanz Kitakyushu	0 - 1	Matsumoto Yamaga	Honjo Stadium
14:00 JST	Kim Jong-pil (yellow card) 49'; Killoran (yellow card) 86'	Summary	Tamabayashi 42'; Kusunose (yellow card) 62'; Shirai (yellow card) 90+4'	Attendance: 3,292; Referee: (Japan) Naohito Ogawa

14 October 2012 38	Yokohama	1 - 2	Giravanz Kitakyushu	Nippatsu Mitsuzawa Stadium
14:00	Takachi (yellow card) 37'; Morimoto 53'	Summary	Arai (yellow card) 63'; Satō (yellow card) 66'; Fuji (yellow card) 66'; Hayashi 71'; Hanato 81'	Attendance: 5,543; Referee: (Japan) Minoru Tojo

21 October 2012 39	Montedio Yamagata	1 - 0	Giravanz Kitakyushu	ND Soft Stadium Yamagata
14:00 JST	Nakashima 7'; Yamazaki (yellow card) 90+4'	Summary	Kimura (yellow card) 45+1'; Hanato (yellow card) 45+1'	Attendance: 5,408; Referee: (Japan) Yuki Noda

28 October 2012 40	Giravanz Kitakyushu	2 - 0	Kyoto Sanga	Honjo Stadium
16:00 JST	Kimura (yellow card) 16'; Takeuchi 75', 90'	Summary	Hwang Te-Song (yellow card) 14'	Attendance: 3,916; Referee: (Japan) Takuto Okabe

4 November 2012 41	Giravanz Kitakyushu	-	Kataller Toyama	Honjo Stadium
13:00 JST				Referee: (Japan)

11 November 2012 42	Tochigi S.C.	-	Giravanz Kitakyushu	Tochigi Green Stadium
13:00 JST				Referee: (Japan)

=== Emperor's Cup ===
9 September 2012 Round 2	F.C. Machida Zelvia	1 - 1 (a.e.t.) (5 - 4 p)	Giravanz Kitakyushu	Setagaya, Tokyo
13:00 JST	Kitai 22'	Report	Tokiwa 51'	Stadium: Komazawa Olympic Park Stadium; Attendance: 1,653; Referee: Shoichiro Mikami
