= 2011 Giravanz Kitakyushu season =

Giravanz Kitakyushu
2011 season
- Manager: Yasutoshi Miura
- Stadium: Honjo Stadium
- J2 League: 8th
Home colours	Away colours

2011 Giravanz Kitakyushu season.

== Squad ==
As of 15 April 2011

Note: Flags indicate national team as defined under FIFA eligibility rules; some limited exceptions apply. Players may hold more than one non-FIFA nationality.

No.	Pos.	Nation	Player
1	GK	JPN	Hiroki Mizuhara
2	DF	JPN	Kazuya Kawabata
3	DF	KOR	Kim Soo-Yeon
4	DF	JPN	Satoshi Nagano
5	MF	JPN	Hiroyoshi Kuwabara
6	DF	JPN	Yuki Fuji
7	MF	JPN	Shinya Sato
8	MF	JPN	Tomoaki Komorida
9	FW	JPN	Yasuaki Oshima
10	MF	JPN	Yuya Sano
11	FW	JPN	Tomoki Ikemoto
13	MF	JPN	Mitsuhiro Seki
14	MF	JPN	Kota Morimura (on loan from FC Tokyo)
15	DF	JPN	Takaki Shigemitsu
16	DF	JPN	Ryoji Fukui

No.	Pos.	Nation	Player
17	MF	JPN	Yuji Kimura
18	FW	JPN	Daisuke Miyakawa
19	FW	JPN	Hiroyuki Hayashi
20	MF	BRA	Leonardo
21	MF	JPN	Kodai Yasuda
22	MF	JPN	Takayuki Tada
23	MF	JPN	Yuki Nagahata
24	FW	JPN	Yuta Kawachi
25	DF	JPN	Ryosuke Kawanabe
26	DF	JPN	Toru Miyamoto
27	MF	JPN	Yuta Hashimura
28	MF	KOR	Oh Seung-Rok
30	GK	JPN	Shogo Tokihisa
31	GK	JPN	Yuya Satō

== J2 League ==
Match	Date	Team	Score	Team	Venue	Attendance
1	2011.03.06	Giravanz Kitakyushu	0-3	JEF United Chiba	Honjo Stadium	3,359
8	2011.04.24	Giravanz Kitakyushu	0-2	Gainare Tottori	Honjo Stadium	3,101
9	2011.04.30	Ehime FC	0-3	Giravanz Kitakyushu	Ningineer Stadium	3,456
10	2011.05.04	Roasso Kumamoto	0-0	Giravanz Kitakyushu	Kumamoto Athletics Stadium	6,948
11	2011.05.08	Giravanz Kitakyushu	1-0	Mito HollyHock	Honjo Stadium	3,199
12	2011.05.14	Tokyo Verdy	4-0	Giravanz Kitakyushu	Ajinomoto Stadium	3,126
13	2011.05.22	Giravanz Kitakyushu	1-0	Kyoto Sanga FC	Honjo Stadium	2,911
14	2011.05.29	Giravanz Kitakyushu	2-1	Kataller Toyama	Honjo Stadium	1,336
15	2011.06.04	Fagiano Okayama	3-0	Giravanz Kitakyushu	Kanko Stadium	8,121
16	2011.06.12	Giravanz Kitakyushu	0-0	Sagan Tosu	Honjo Stadium	2,524
17	2011.06.19	Tochigi SC	2-1	Giravanz Kitakyushu	Tochigi Green Stadium	6,800
18	2011.06.26	Giravanz Kitakyushu	2-1	Thespa Kusatsu	Honjo Stadium	2,340
19	2011.07.02	Giravanz Kitakyushu	3-0	Oita Trinita	Honjo Stadium	6,670
2	2011.07.06	Consadole Sapporo	0-0	Giravanz Kitakyushu	Sapporo Dome	7,811
20	2011.07.10	Gainare Tottori	0-1	Giravanz Kitakyushu	Tottori Bank Bird Stadium	3,390
21	2011.07.17	Giravanz Kitakyushu	1-2	Fagiano Okayama	Honjo Stadium	4,686
22	2011.07.24	Yokohama FC	1-2	Giravanz Kitakyushu	NHK Spring Mitsuzawa Football Stadium	8,828
23	2011.07.30	Giravanz Kitakyushu	1-0	FC Tokyo	Honjo Stadium	6,909
3	2011.08.05	Tokushima Vortis	0-1	Giravanz Kitakyushu	Pocarisweat Stadium	3,262
24	2011.08.14	Kyoto Sanga FC	1-0	Giravanz Kitakyushu	Kyoto Nishikyogoku Athletic Stadium	5,185
25	2011.08.21	Giravanz Kitakyushu	2-2	Ehime FC	Honjo Stadium	5,022
26	2011.08.27	Shonan Bellmare	1-1	Giravanz Kitakyushu	Hiratsuka Stadium	6,728
4	2011.09.03	Giravanz Kitakyushu	2-2	Yokohama FC	Honjo Stadium	5,012
27	2011.09.10	Giravanz Kitakyushu	1-1	Tokushima Vortis	Honjo Stadium	4,021
28	2011.09.17	Giravanz Kitakyushu	0-3	Consadole Sapporo	Honjo Stadium	4,693
29	2011.09.25	JEF United Chiba	1-0	Giravanz Kitakyushu	Fukuda Denshi Arena	8,969
5	2011.09.28	FC Tokyo	2-0	Giravanz Kitakyushu	Ajinomoto Stadium	10,229
30	2011.10.01	Giravanz Kitakyushu	3-2	FC Gifu	Honjo Stadium	3,492
31	2011.10.16	Kataller Toyama	1-2	Giravanz Kitakyushu	Toyama Stadium	3,296
6	2011.10.19	Giravanz Kitakyushu	0-0	Shonan Bellmare	Honjo Stadium	3,011
32	2011.10.23	Thespa Kusatsu	2-2	Giravanz Kitakyushu	Shoda Shoyu Stadium Gunma	4,076
7	2011.10.26	FC Gifu	1-3	Giravanz Kitakyushu	Gifu Nagaragawa Stadium	2,150
33	2011.10.29	Giravanz Kitakyushu	2-1	Tochigi SC	Honjo Stadium	2,303
34	2011.11.06	Mito HollyHock	1-0	Giravanz Kitakyushu	K's denki Stadium Mito	2,511
35	2011.11.12	Giravanz Kitakyushu	2-0	Roasso Kumamoto	Honjo Stadium	5,307
36	2011.11.20	Sagan Tosu	2-3	Giravanz Kitakyushu	Best Amenity Stadium	12,884
37	2011.11.27	Giravanz Kitakyushu	1-2	Tokyo Verdy	Honjo Stadium	7,080
38	2011.12.03	Oita Trinita	2-2	Giravanz Kitakyushu	Oita Bank Dome	10,395
