= 2010 Giravanz Kitakyushu season =

Giravanz Kitakyushu
2010 season
- Manager: George Yonashiro
- Stadium: Honjo Stadium
- J. League 2: 19th
- Emperor's Cup: 3rd Round
- Top goalscorer: Yasuaki Oshima (7)

2010 Giravanz Kitakyushu season

== Competitions ==
Competitions	Position
J. League 2	19th / 19 clubs
Emperor's Cup	3rd Round

== Player statistics ==
No.	Pos.	Player	D.o.B. (Age)	Height / Weight	J. League 2		Emperor's Cup		Total	
No.	Pos.	Player	D.o.B. (Age)	Height / Weight	Apps	Goals	Apps	Goals	Apps	Goals
1	GK	Hiroki Mizuhara	January 15, 1975 (aged 35)	cm / kg	33	0				
2	DF	Tatico	January 10, 1981 (aged 29)	cm / kg	3	0				
3	DF	Takuya Ito	June 11, 1974 (aged 35)	cm / kg	1	0				
4	DF	Satoshi Nagano	August 2, 1982 (aged 27)	cm / kg	33	0				
5	MF	Hiroyoshi Kuwabara	October 2, 1971 (aged 38)	cm / kg	28	0				
6	MF	Shinya Sato	November 13, 1978 (aged 31)	cm / kg	23	1				
7	DF	Yuki Fuji	May 7, 1981 (aged 28)	cm / kg	9	1				
8	MF	Tomoki Hidaka	April 6, 1980 (aged 29)	cm / kg	24	0				
9	FW	Tomoki Ikemoto	March 27, 1985 (aged 24)	cm / kg	31	2				
10	MF	Yuya Sano	April 22, 1982 (aged 27)	cm / kg	31	2				
11	FW	Daisuke Miyakawa	October 6, 1979 (aged 30)	cm / kg	24	1				
13	DF	Kazuya Kawabata	October 22, 1981 (aged 28)	cm / kg	21	0				
14	MF	Jun Muramatsu	April 10, 1982 (aged 27)	cm / kg	12	0				
15	MF	Wellington	September 4, 1981 (aged 28)	cm / kg	28	0				
16	DF	Takaki Shigemitsu	July 31, 1983 (aged 26)	cm / kg	21	0				
17	FW	Yudai Nakashima	August 31, 1984 (aged 25)	cm / kg	17	2				
18	FW	Taro Hasegawa	August 17, 1979 (aged 30)	cm / kg	27	0				
19	FW	Yuta Kawachi	November 8, 1985 (aged 24)	cm / kg	0	0				
20	MF	Mitsuhiro Seki	May 8, 1982 (aged 27)	cm / kg	33	2				
21	GK	Shogo Tokihisa	April 15, 1984 (aged 25)	cm / kg	2	0				
22	FW	Leonardo	February 4, 1986 (aged 24)	cm / kg	16	2				
23	DF	Hiromichi Katano	April 6, 1982 (aged 27)	cm / kg	1	0				
24	DF	Ryosuke Kawanabe	February 26, 1986 (aged 24)	cm / kg	19	0				
25	FW	Yasuaki Oshima	September 1, 1981 (aged 28)	cm / kg	34	7				
26	MF	Tomoaki Komorida	July 10, 1981 (aged 28)	cm / kg	18	0				
27	MF	Takayuki Tada	April 7, 1988 (aged 21)	cm / kg	5	0				
31	GK	Yuya Funatsu	November 22, 1983 (aged 26)	cm / kg	1	0				

== Other pages ==
- (in Japanese) J. League official site
