= Killoran =

Killoran (Irish: Mac Giolla Luaighrinn) is a surname of Irish origin meaning son of a devotee of (Saint) Luaighreann. Spelling variations include Mac Killoran, Gilloran, Gilleran and O'Giollarain. It could also come from the toponymic Cill Luaighrinn, in this case meaning church of Luaighrinn.

== People with this surname ==
- Niall Killoran, (born 1992), Irish-Japanese footballer
- Colin Killoran (born 1992), Irish-Japanese footballer
- Paddy Killoran (1904–1965), Irish musician
- Patrick Killoran (died 2010), Australian public servant
