= James Latham =

James Latham may refer to:

- James Latham (painter) (c. 1696–1747), Irish portrait painter
- James Latham (criminal) (1942–1965), American serial killer
- James Latham (priest), Irish Anglican priest
