= James Latham (priest) =

James Latham was an Irish Anglican priest.

Latham was educated at Trinity College, Dublin. He was ordained in 1828. After curacies in Killoran and Dublin he was Rector of Wexford from 1878 to 1921. He was Archdeacon of Ferns from 1897 to 1934.
