= Tomoaki Komorida =

Japanese footballer

Tomoaki Komorida 小森田 友明
Personal information
- Full name: Tomoaki Komorida
- Date of birth: July 10, 1981 (age 45)
- Place of birth: Kumamoto, Japan
- Height: 1.86 m (6 ft 1 in)
- Positions: Defender; midfielder

Youth career
- 1997–1999: Kunimi High School

Senior career*
Years	Team	Apps	(Gls)
2000–2001	Avispa Fukuoka	2	(0)
2002–2005	Oita Trinita	79	(4)
2005	Montedio Yamagata	6	(0)
2006	Vissel Kobe	23	(0)
2007–2009	Roasso Kumamoto	76	(18)
2010	Persela Lamongan	10	(1)
2010–2012	Giravanz Kitakyushu	40	(2)
Total		236	(25)
- * Club domestic league appearances and goals

Tomoaki Komorida (小森田 友明, Komorida Tomoaki; born July 10, 1981) is a former Japanese football player.

== Playing career ==
Komorida was born in Kumamoto Prefecture on July 10, 1981. After graduating from high school, he joined the J1 League club Avispa Fukuoka in 2000. Although he debuted as a midfielder in 2001, he did not play much and the club was relegated to the J2 League at the end of the 2001 season. In 2002, he moved to the J2 club Oita Trinita. He became a regular player as a defensive midfielder and the club won the championship in 2002 and was promoted in 2003. He played many matches until 2005. In September 2005, he moved to the J2 club Montedio Yamagata. In 2006, he moved to the J2 club Vissel Kobe. Although he became a regular player as a defensive midfielder, he was gradually played less during that summer. In 2007, he moved to the Japan Football League club Rosso Kumamoto (later Roasso Kumamoto) based in his local region. He played as a regular player and the club was promoted to J2 in 2008. Although he did not play as much, he still played in many matches. In 2010, he moved to Indonesia and joined Persela Lamongan. In July 2010, he returned to Japan and joined the J2 club Giravanz Kitakyushu. He played often as a defensive midfielder and center back until 2012 when he retired.

== Club statistics ==
Club performance			League		Cup		League Cup		Total	
Season	Club	League	Apps	Goals	Apps	Goals	Apps	Goals	Apps	Goals
Japan			League		Emperor's Cup		J.League Cup		Total	
2000	Avispa Fukuoka	J1 League	0	0	0	0	0	0	0	0
2001	Avispa Fukuoka	J1 League	2	0	0	0	2	0	4	0
2002	Oita Trinita	J2 League	31	4	4	1	-		35	5
2003	Oita Trinita	J1 League	15	0	1	0	3	0	19	0
2004	Oita Trinita	J1 League	24	0	2	0	2	0	28	0
2005	Oita Trinita	J1 League	9	0	0	0	4	0	13	0
2005	Montedio Yamagata	J2 League	6	0	1	0	-		7	0
2006	Vissel Kobe	J2 League	23	0	1	0	-		24	0
2007	Rosso Kumamoto	Football League	28	8	1	1	-		29	9
2008	Roasso Kumamoto	J2 League	25	6	1	1	-		26	7
2009	Roasso Kumamoto	J2 League	23	4	0	0	-		23	4
Indonesia			League		Piala Indonesia		League Cup		Total	
2009-10	Persela Lamongan	Super League	10	1					10	1
Japan			League		Emperor's Cup		J.League Cup		Total	
2010	Giravanz Kitakyushu	J2 League	18	0	2	1	-		20	1
2011	Giravanz Kitakyushu	J2 League	4	0	2	0	-		6	0
2012	Giravanz Kitakyushu	J2 League	18	2	0	0	-		18	2
Total	Japan		226	24	15	4	11	0	252	28
Total	Indonesia		10	1					10	1
Career total			236	25	15	4	11	0	262	29
