= Satoshi Tokiwa =

Japanese footballer

Personal information
- Full name: Satoshi Tokiwa
- Date of birth: May 14, 1987 (age 39)
- Place of birth: Tokyo, Japan
- Height: 1.73 m (5 ft 8 in)
- Position: Striker

Youth career
- 2000–2001: Yokogawa Musashino
- 2003–2005: FC Tokyo
- 2006–2009: Tokyo University of Agriculture

Senior career*
Years	Team	Apps	(Gls)
2010–2011	Mito HollyHock	45	(8)
2012	Giravanz Kitakyushu	28	(5)
2013–2014	Tokyo Verdy	76	(14)
2015	Roasso Kumamoto	23	(0)
2016–	Thespakusatsu Gunma	23	(3)
Total		195	(30)
- * Club domestic league appearances and goals as of 03:28, 21 November 2023

Satoshi Tokiwa (常盤 聡, Tokiwa Satoshi; born May 14, 1987 in Tokyo) is a Japanese former footballer.

== Early life ==
Satoshi was born in Tokyo. He played youth football for Yokogawa Musashino. He went to the Tokyo University of Agriculture.

== Career ==
Tokiwa is a product of FC Tokyo's youth academy. At under-18 level, Tokiwa scored 15 goals in the 2005 J Youth Cup; the domestic league for under-18 youth players in Japan.

Upon graduating from Tokyo University of Agriculture, Tokiwa joined Mito HollyHock in 2010. He made his J. League debut on 4 April 2010 against Kashiwa Reysol, and scored his first goal in a 2–1 victory against Oita Trinita on 1 September.

On 13 December 2012, Tokiwa completed a permanent move to Tokyo Verdy.

== Career statistics ==
Updated to 23 February 2016.

Club performance			League		Cup		Total	
Season	Club	League	Apps	Goals	Apps	Goals	Apps	Goals
Japan			League		Emperor's Cup		Total	
2010	Mito HollyHock	J2 League	23	4	2	0	25	4
2011	Mito HollyHock	J2 League	22	4	0	0	22	4
2012	Giravanz Kitakyushu	J2 League	28	5	1	1	29	6
2013	Tokyo Verdy	J2 League	39	8	1	0	40	8
2014	Tokyo Verdy	J2 League	37	6	1	0	38	6
2015	Roasso Kumamoto	J2 League	23	0	0	0	23	0
Career total			172	27	5	1	177	28
