= Taro Hasegawa =

Japanese footballer

Taro Hasegawa 長谷川 太郎
Personal information
- Full name: Taro Hasegawa
- Date of birth: August 17, 1979 (age 47)
- Place of birth: Adachi, Tokyo, Japan
- Height: 1.67 m (5 ft 5 1/2 in)
- Position: Forward

Youth career
- 1995–1997: Kashiwa Reysol

Senior career*
Years	Team	Apps	(Gls)
1998–2001	Kashiwa Reysol	19	(1)
2002	Albirex Niigata	12	(0)
2003–2007	Ventforet Kofu	84	(23)
2007	Tokushima Vortis	23	(2)
2008	Yokohama FC	14	(0)
2009–2010	Giravanz Kitakyushu	52	(9)
2011–2013	Urayasu SC		
2014	Mohammedan	11	(3)
Total		215	(38)
Medal record
Kashiwa Reysol
Winner	J.League Cup	1999
- * Club domestic league appearances and goals

Taro Hasegawa (長谷川 太郎, Hasegawa Tarō; born August 17, 1979) is a former Japanese football player. He is the current senior striker coach Japan Football League club of Briobecca Urayasu.

== Playing career ==
Hasegawa was born in Adachi, Tokyo on August 17, 1979. He joined J1 League club Kashiwa Reysol from youth team in 1998. On March 28, he debuted against Consadole Sapporo. In 1999, he played often and the club won the championship in the J.League Cup. However he did not play much after 2000. In 2002, he moved to the J2 League club Albirex Niigata. However he did not play much there, either. In 2003, he moved to the J2 club Ventforet Kofu. Although he did not play much until 2004, he played all matches as left winger and scored 17 goals. The club also won third place and was promoted to J1 in 2006. However he did not play much in 2006. In August 2007, he moved to the J2 club Tokushima Vortis. He played all matches as regular player. In 2008, he moved to the J2 club Yokohama FC. However he did not play much. In 2009, he moved to the Japan Football League club New Wave Kitakyushu (later Giravanz Kitakyushu). He played as a regular player and the club was promoted to J2 in 2010. In 2011, he moved to Urayasu SC. In 2014, he move to the Indian club Mohammedan. He retired in December 2014.

== Club statistics ==
Club performance			League		Cup		League Cup		Total	
Season	Club	League	Apps	Goals	Apps	Goals	Apps	Goals	Apps	Goals
Japan			League		Emperor's Cup		J.League Cup		Total	
1998	Kashiwa Reysol	J1 League	1	0	1	0	0	0	2	0
1999	Kashiwa Reysol	J1 League	13	0	2	0	5	2	20	2
2000	Kashiwa Reysol	J1 League	3	0	0	0	1	0	4	0
2001	Kashiwa Reysol	J1 League	2	1	0	0	0	0	2	1
2002	Albirex Niigata	J2 League	12	0	1	0	-		13	0
2003	Ventforet Kofu	J2 League	4	0	0	0	-		4	0
2004	Ventforet Kofu	J2 League	17	3	2	1	-		19	4
2005	Ventforet Kofu	J2 League	44	17	2	1	-		46	18
2006	Ventforet Kofu	J1 League	17	3	1	1	2	1	20	5
2007	Ventforet Kofu	J1 League	2	0	0	0	1	0	3	0
2007	Tokushima Vortis	J2 League	23	2	2	1	-		25	3
2008	Yokohama FC	J2 League	14	0	0	0	-		14	0
2009	New Wave Kitakyushu	Football League	25	9	0	0	-		25	9
2010	Giravanz Kitakyushu	J2 League	27	0	1	0	-		28	0
Total			204	35	12	4	9	3	225	42
