= Daiki Watari =

Japanese footballer

Daiki Watari 渡 大生
Personal information
- Full name: Daiki Watari
- Date of birth: 25 June 1993 (age 33)
- Place of birth: Asakita-ku, Hiroshima, Japan
- Height: 1.76 m (5 ft 9 in)
- Position: Forward

Team information
- Current team: Tokushima Vortis
- Number: 16

Youth career
- 2009–2011: Hiroshima Minami High School

Senior career*
Years	Team	Apps	(Gls)
2012–2015	Giravanz Kitakyushu	120	(24)
2016–2017	Tokushima Vortis	83	(35)
2018–2019	Sanfrecce Hiroshima	40	(4)
2020	Oita Trinita	23	(2)
2021–2022	Avispa Fukuoka	31	(3)
2023–	Tokushima Vortis	103	(15)
Medal record
Sanfrecce Hiroshima
Runner-up	J1 League	2018
- * Club domestic league appearances and goals as of 14 August 2026

Daiki Watari (渡 大生, born 25 June 1993) is a Japanese footballer who plays as a forward for J2 League club Tokushima Vortis.

== Club statistics ==
As of 15 February 2023.

Club	Season	League			Emperor's Cup		J.League Cup		AFC		Total	
Club	Season	Division	Apps	Goals	Apps	Goals	Apps	Goals	Apps	Goals	Apps	Goals
Giravanz Kitakyushu	2012	J2 League	24	5	0	0	–		–		24	5
Giravanz Kitakyushu	2013	J2 League	34	8	2	1	–		–		36	9
Giravanz Kitakyushu	2014	J2 League	37	4	3	1	–		–		38	5
Giravanz Kitakyushu	2015	J2 League	35	7	2	0	–		–		37	7
Tokushima Vortis	2016	J2 League	41	12	3	0	–		–		44	12
Tokushima Vortis	2017	J2 League	42	23	1	0	–		–		43	23
Sanfrecce Hiroshima	2018	J1 League	17	1	2	0	6	3	–		25	4
Sanfrecce Hiroshima	2019	J1 League	23	3	3	1	1	1	6	2	33	7
Oita Trinita	2020	J1 League	23	2	–		2	1	–		25	3
Avispa Fukuoka	2021	J1 League	26	2	0	0	4	0	–		30	2
Avispa Fukuoka	2022	J1 League	11	1	3	2	4	0	–		18	3
Total			313	68	19	5	17	5	6	2	353	80
