= Kaique (footballer) =

Brazilian footballer

Personal information
- Full name: Kaique Vergilio da Silva
- Date of birth: 19 January 1996 (age 30)
- Place of birth: São Paulo, Brazil
- Height: 1.75 m (5 ft 9 in)
- Position: Forward

Team information
- Current team: Bagé

Youth career
- 2004–2013: Corinthians

Senior career*
| Years | Team | Apps | (Gls) |
| 2014–2016 | Corinthians | 0 | (0) |
| 2014–2015 | → Thespakusatsu Gunma (loan) | 19 | (0) |
| 2016 | → Santos (loan) | 0 | (0) |
| 2017 | Santos | 0 | (0) |
| 2018 | Paranavaí | 12 | (2) |
| 2018 | São Caetano | 0 | (0) |
| 2019 | Água Santa | 5 | (0) |
| 2019 | → São Caetano (loan) | 2 | (0) |
| 2020 | Votuporanguense | 3 | (0) |
| 2020–2021 | Fénix | 22 | (3) |
| 2022 | Caldense | 7 | (0) |
| 2022 | Avenida | | |
| 2023 | São José | 3 | (0) |
| 2023– | Bagé | | |
- * Club domestic league appearances and goals as of 4 February 2023

Kaique Vergilio da Silva (born 19 abril 1999), known as Gracha or simply Kaique, is a Brazilian professional footballer who plays as a forward for Campeonato Gaúcho Série A2 club Bagé.

== Club career ==
Kaique was born in São Paulo, and joined Corinthians' youth setup at the age of eight. After progressing through the youth setup, he was loaned to J2 League side Thespakusatsu Gunma on 13 August 2014.

Kaique made his senior debut on 31 August 2014, coming on as a late substitute for Yohei Sakai in a 3–1 away loss against Matsumoto Yamaga FC. After appearing rarely, he remained at the club for a further year, and started to feature more regularly.

On 18 May 2016, Kaique signed for Santos on loan until the end of the year, being initially assigned to the B-team. The following 6 January, he extended his contract for one further year.

In January 2018, Kaique went on trial with Azerbaijan Premier League club Gabala FK.

== Career statistics ==
As of 3 November 2020

| Club | Season | League | | | State League | | Cup | | Continental | | Other | | Total | |
| Club | Season | Division | Apps | Goals | Apps | Goals | Apps | Goals | Apps | Goals | Apps | Goals | Apps | Goals |
|---|---|---|---|---|---|---|---|---|---|---|---|---|---|---|
| Thespakusatsu Gunma | 2014 | J2 League | 4 | 0 | — | | 0 | 0 | — | | — | | 4 | 0 |
| Thespakusatsu Gunma | 2015 | J2 League | 15 | 0 | — | | 0 | 0 | — | | — | | 15 | 0 |
| Thespakusatsu Gunma | Total | | 19 | 0 | — | | 0 | 0 | — | | — | | 19 | 0 |
| Santos | 2016 | Série A | 0 | 0 | — | | 0 | 0 | — | | 11 (Note: Appearance(s) in Copa Paulista) | 0 | 11 | 0 |
| Santos | 2017 | Série A | 0 | 0 | — | | 0 | 0 | 0 | 0 | 1 | 0 | 1 | 0 |
| Santos | Total | | 0 | 0 | — | | 0 | 0 | 0 | 0 | 12 | 0 | 12 | 0 |
| Paranavaí | 2018 | Paranaense Série Prata | — | | 12 | 2 | — | | — | | — | | 12 | 2 |
| São Caetano | 2018 | Paulista A2 | — | | 0 | 0 | — | | — | | 17 | 0 | 17 | 0 |
| Água Santa | 2019 | Paulista A2 | — | | 5 | 0 | — | | — | | 5 | 0 | 10 | 0 |
| São Caetano (loan) | 2019 | Série D | 2 | 0 | — | | — | | — | | — | | 2 | 0 |
| Votuporanguense | 2020 | Paulista A2 | — | | 3 | 0 | — | | — | | — | | 3 | 0 |
| Fénix | 2020 | Primera División | 2 | 0 | — | | — | | — | | — | | 2 | 0 |
| Career total | | | 23 | 0 | 20 | 2 | 0 | 0 | 0 | 0 | 34 | 0 | 77 | 2 |
