= Daisuke Miyakawa =

Japanese footballer

Daisuke Miyakawa 宮川 大輔
Personal information
- Full name: Daisuke Miyakawa
- Date of birth: October 6, 1979 (age 47)
- Place of birth: Atsugi, Kanagawa, Japan
- Height: 1.81 m (5 ft 11 1/2 in)
- Position: Forward

Youth career
- 1995–1997: Teikyo Daisan High School

Senior career*
Years	Team	Apps	(Gls)
1998–2001	Cerezo Osaka	1	(1)
2002–2005	Thespa Kusatsu	43	(24)
2006–2011	Giravanz Kitakyushu	104	(27)
2012	SC Sagamihara		
Total		148	(52)
Medal record
Cerezo Osaka
Runner-up	Emperor's Cup	2001
- * Club domestic league appearances and goals

Daisuke Miyakawa (宮川 大輔, Miyakawa Daisuke; born October 6, 1979) is a former Japanese football player.

== Playing career ==
Miyakawa was born in Atsugi on October 6, 1979. After graduating from high school, he joined J1 League club Cerezo Osaka in 1998. On May 22, 1999, he debuted and scored a goal against JEF United Ichihara. However he could only play this match for the club until 2001. In 2002, he moved to Prefectural Leagues club Thespa Kusatsu and played many matches. The club was promoted to Regional Leagues in 2003, Japan Football League (JFL) in 2004 and J2 League in 2005. In 2006, he moved to Regional Leagues club New Wave Kitakyushu (later Giravanz Kitakyushu). He played as regular player and the club was promoted to JFL in 2008 and J2 in 2010. However his opportunity to play decreased from 2010. In 2012, he moved to Regional Leagues club SC Sagamihara. He retired end of 2012 season.

== Career statistics ==
Appearances and goals by club, season and competition
Club	Season	League			Emperor's Cup		J.League Cup		Total	
Club	Season	Division	Apps	Goals	Apps	Goals	Apps	Goals	Apps	Goals
Cerezo Osaka	1998	J1 League	0	0	0	0	0	0	0	0
Cerezo Osaka	1999	J1 League	1	1	0	0	0	0	1	1
Cerezo Osaka	2000	J1 League	0	0	0	0	0	0	0	0
Cerezo Osaka	2001	J1 League	0	0	0	0	0	0	0	0
Thespa Kusatsu	2002	Prefectural Leagues	10	13	—		—		10	13
Thespa Kusatsu	2003	Regional Leagues	13	9	0	0	—		13	9
Thespa Kusatsu	2004	Football League	8	0	4	2	—		12	2
Thespa Kusatsu	2005	J2 League	12	2	0	0	—		12	2
New Wave Kitakyushu	2006	Regional Leagues	16	7	—		—		16	7
New Wave Kitakyushu	2007	Regional Leagues	8	4	—		—		8	4
New Wave Kitakyushu	2008	Football League	32	9	3	1	—		35	10
New Wave Kitakyushu	2009	Football League	23	6	1	0	—		24	6
Giravanz Kitakyushu	2010	J2 League	24	1	2	0	—		26	1
Giravanz Kitakyushu	2011	J2 League	1	0	0	0	—		1	0
Career total			148	52	10	3	0	0	158	55
