= Niall Killoran =

Japanese-Irish footballer

Niall Killoran キローラン菜入
Personal information
- Full name: Niall Killoran
- Date of birth: 7 April 1992 (age 34)
- Place of birth: Shinjuku, Tokyo, Japan
- Height: 1.87 m (6 ft 2 in)
- Position: Goalkeeper

Youth career
- ?–2010: Tokyo Verdy

Senior career*
| Years | Team | Apps | (Gls) |
| 2011–2014 | Tokyo Verdy | 6 | (0) |
| 2012 | → Giravanz Kitakyushu (loan) | 0 | (0) |
| 2015–2016 | Matsumoto Yamaga | 0 | (0) |
| 2017 | Kagoshima United | 15 | (0) |
| 2018–2021 | Tiamo Hirakata | 38 | (0) |
- * Club domestic league appearances and goals as of 18 December 2021, 12:22 (UTC)

Niall Killoran (キローラン菜入, Kirōran Nairu; born 7 April 1992) is a Japanese former footballer who plays as a goalkeeper. He also holds Irish citizenship. He currently General manager of Velago Ikoma.

== Career ==
Killoran made his professional debut for Tokyo Verdy on 26 July 2014, playing the full ninety minutes in a 1–1 draw with Matsumoto Yamaga.

On 25 February 2017, Niall officially joined to J3 club, Kagoshima United for ahead of 2017 season.

On 8 February 2018, Niall joined to JFL club, Tiamo Hirakata.

On 18 December 2021, Niall announcement officially retirement from football after last play in Tiamo Hirakata.

== Personal life ==
Killoran was born in Tokyo to a Japanese mother and Irish father. His twin brother Colin is also a professional footballer.

== Career statistics ==
=== Club ===
As of 29 November 2014

Appearances and goals by club, season and competition
| Club | Season | League | | | Cup | | League Cup | | Other | | Total | |
| Club | Season | Division | Apps | Goals | Apps | Goals | Apps | Goals | Apps | Goals | Apps | Goals |
|---|---|---|---|---|---|---|---|---|---|---|---|---|
| Tokyo Verdy | 2011 | J. League Division 2 | 0 | 0 | 0 | 0 | 0 | 0 | 0 | 0 | 0 | 0 |
| Tokyo Verdy | 2013 | J. League Division 2 | 0 | 0 | 0 | 0 | 0 | 0 | 0 | 0 | 0 | 0 |
| Tokyo Verdy | 2014 | J. League Division 2 | 6 | 0 | 0 | 0 | 0 | 0 | 0 | 0 | 6 | 0 |
| Giravanz Kitakyushu | 2012 | J. League Division 2 | 0 | 0 | 0 | 0 | 0 | 0 | 0 | 0 | 0 | 0 |
| Career total | | | 6 | 0 | 0 | 0 | 0 | 0 | 0 | 0 | 6 | 0 |
