= Yasuaki Oshima =

Japanese footballer (born 1981)

Yasuaki Oshima 大島 康明
Personal information
- Full name: Yasuaki Oshima
- Date of birth: 1 September 1981 (age 45)
- Place of birth: Kobe, Hyogo, Japan
- Height: 1.77 m (5 ft 9 1/2 in)
- Position: Forward

Youth career
- 1997–1999: Vissel Kobe

Senior career*
Years	Team	Apps	(Gls)
2000–2001	Vissel Kobe	0	(0)
2001–2009	Tokushima Vortis	185	(69)
2009–2012	Giravanz Kitakyushu	65	(16)
Total		250	(85)

Managerial career
- 2021: Kagoshima United
- 2023–2024: Kagoshima United
- 2025: FC Gifu
- * Club domestic league appearances and goals

Yasuaki Oshima (大島 康明, Ōshima Yasuaki; born September 1, 1981) is a Japanese professional football manager and former player who most recently managed Kagoshima United.

== Playing career ==
Oshima was born in Kobe on September 1, 1981. He joined J1 League club Vissel Kobe based in his local from youth team in 2000. However he could not play at all in the match until 2001. In March 2001, he moved to Japan Football League (JFL) club Otsuka Pharmaceutical (later Tokushima Vortis). He became a regular player and scored many goals. He was 2nd place in goal scorer ranking in 2003 and 2004 season. The club also won the champions in 2003 and 2004 season and was promoted to J2 League from 2005. From 2005, although his opportunity to play decreased, he played many matches. However he could hardly play in the match in 2009. In September 2009, he moved to JFL club New Wave Kitakyushu (later Giravanz Kitakyushu). He played many matches and the club was promoted to J2 from 2010. Although he played many matches as regular player in 2010, his opportunity to play decreased from 2011 and he retired end of 2012 season.

== Managerial career ==
In 2021, Ōshima announcement officially caretaker manager of Kagoshima United.

On 22 August 2023, Ōshima return to Kagoshima United since two years ago as manager. On 2 December 2023, Ōshima brought his club promotion to J2 League after draw 1–1 against Gainare Tottori and finished 2nd position. On May 27th, 2024, he was fired after a string of bad results.

== Club statistics ==
Club performance			League		Cup		League Cup		Total	
Season	Club	League	Apps	Goals	Apps	Goals	Apps	Goals	Apps	Goals
Japan			League		Emperor's Cup		J.League Cup		Total	
2000	Vissel Kobe	J1 League	0	0	0	0	0	0	0	0
2001	Vissel Kobe	J1 League	0	0	0	0	0	0	0	0
2001	Otsuka Pharmaceutical	Football League	27	13	3	1	-		30	14
2002	Otsuka Pharmaceutical	Football League	17	4	3	2	-		20	6
2003	Otsuka Pharmaceutical	Football League	21	19	2	1	-		23	20
2004	Otsuka Pharmaceutical	Football League	29	20	1	2	-		30	22
2005	Tokushima Vortis	J2 League	20	5	0	0	-		20	5
2006	Tokushima Vortis	J2 League	23	2	1	0	-		24	2
2007	Tokushima Vortis	J2 League	20	1	1	1	-		21	2
2008	Tokushima Vortis	J2 League	26	5	1	0	-		27	5
2009	Tokushima Vortis	J2 League	2	0	-		-		2	0
2009	New Wave Kitakyushu	Football League	9	5	0	0	-		9	5
2010	Giravanz Kitakyushu	J2 League	34	7	2	0	-		36	7
2011	Giravanz Kitakyushu	J2 League	14	4	2	0	-		16	4
2012	Giravanz Kitakyushu	J2 League	8	0	0	0	-		8	0
Career total			250	85	16	7	0	0	266	92

== Managerial statistics ==
As of 26 May 2024.

Managerial record by club and tenure
Team	From	To	Record				
Team	From	To	G	W	D	L	Win %
Kagoshima United	28 May 2021	3 July 2021	7	3	1	3	42.86
Kagoshima United	22 August 2023	27 May 2024	34	12	9	13	35.29
Total			41	15	10	16	36.59

== Honours ==
=== Manager ===
Kagoshima United

- Promotion to J2 League: 2023
