= Jairo (footballer, born 1986) =

Brazilian footballer

Personal information
- Full name: Jairo Luis Blumer
- Date of birth: December 31, 1986 (age 39)
- Place of birth: Campinas, Brazil
- Height: 1.73 m (5 ft 8 in)
- Position: Defensive midfielder

Team information
- Current team: Votuporanguense

Youth career
- 2003: Atlético Paranaense

Senior career*
Years	Team	Apps	(Gls)
2004–2006	→ Paulista (Loan)		
2007–2009	Atlético Paranaense	1	(0)
2007–2008	→ Paulista (Loan)		
2008	→ Ponte Preta (Loan)		
2009–2010	São Caetano	44	(1)
2011	Mirassol		
2011	Vila Nova	18	(2)
2012	Grêmio Barueri		
2012	Guaratinguetá	13	(0)
2013	XV de Piracicaba		
2013	Mirassol		
2014	Kyoto Sanga	15	(0)
2015	Ferroviária	11	(0)
2016	Penapolense	17	(0)
2017	Desportivo Brasil	6	(0)
2018–	Votuporanguense	10	(0)
- * Club domestic league appearances and goals

Jairo Luis Blumer (born December 31, 1986, in Campinas), or simply Jairo, is a Brazilian defensive midfielder who plays for Votuporanguense.

== Honours ==
- Brazilian Cup: 2005

== Contract ==
- Paulista 1 January 2008 to 31 December 2008
- Atlético-PR 30 June 2007 to 30 June 2010
