= Colin Killoran =

Japanese-Irish footballer (born 1992)

Colin Killoran キローラン 木鈴
Personal information
- Date of birth: 7 April 1992 (age 34)
- Place of birth: Shinjuku, Tokyo, Japan
- Height: 1.85 m (6 ft 1 in)
- Position: Defender

Team information
- Current team: Vonds Ichihara
- Number: 22

Youth career
- 2008–2010: Tokyo Verdy Youth

Senior career*
Years	Team	Apps	(Gls)
2011–2015	Tokyo Verdy	4	(0)
2012	→ Giravanz Kitakyushu (loan)	29	(3)
2015	→ Blaublitz Akita (loan)	11	(0)
2016	Hilal Bergheim	12	(1)
2017–2020	Suzuka Unlimited	37	(1)
2021–	Vonds Ichihara	37	(1)
- * Club domestic league appearances and goals as of 20 November 2023, 12:00 (UTC)

Colin Killoran (キローラン 木鈴, Kirōran Korin; born 7 April 1992) is a Japanese footballer who plays as a defender for Vonds Ichihara.

== Club career ==
Killoran is a product of Tokyo Verdy's youth system, first entering the club as a ten-year-old.

He was a member of the All Japan club youth tournament winning team in 2010.

On 8 January 2012, Killoran joined Giravanz Kitakyushu on a season-long loan deal. His first league appearance came on 4 March 2012 against Tokushima Vortis.

On 15 June 2013, Killoran made his league debut for Tokyo Verdy, coming on as a 29th-minute substitute in the 2–1 loss to V-Varen Nagasaki.

Killoran spent the 2015–16 season in Germany with German club SC Kapellen-Erft.

In 2017, he joined to Suzuka Point Getters.

In 2021, he joined to Vonds Ichihara after left from Suzuka Point Getters.

== International career ==
In August 2010, Killoran was selected to Japan U-19 team for the SBS International Youth Tournament.

== Personal life ==
Killoran was born in Tokyo to a Japanese mother and Irish father. His twin brother Niall is also a former professional footballer. He also holds Irish citizenship.

== Career statistics ==
Updated to 20 February 2016.

Club	Season	League			Cup		Other		Total	
Club	Season	Division	Apps	Goals	Apps	Goals	Apps	Goals	Apps	Goals
Tokyo Verdy	2011	J2 League	0	0	0	0	0	0	0	0
Giravanz Kitakyushu	2012	J2 League	29	3	1	0	–		30	3
Tokyo Verdy	2013	J2 League	3	0	0	0	0	0	3	0
Tokyo Verdy	2014	J2 League	1	0	0	0	0	0	1	0
Tokyo Verdy	2015	J2 League	0	0	0	0	0	0	0	0
Blaublitz Akita	2015	J3 League	11	0	2	0	–		13	0
Career total			44	3	3	0	0	0	47	3
