= Tatico =

Brazilian footballer

Personal information
- Full name: Wilson Deodato da Silva
- Date of birth: January 10, 1981 (age 45)
- Place of birth: Brazil
- Height: 1.93 m (6 ft 4 in)
- Position: Defender

Senior career*
Years	Team	Apps	(Gls)
2001–2002	Juventude		
2003–2004	Okinawa Kariyushi FC		
2005	SEV		
2005–2006	FC Ryukyu	28	(4)
2007	Rio Preto		
2007–2010	Giravanz Kitakyushu	41	(8)
2011	Unsommet Iwate Hachimantai		
2012	Tonan Maebashi		
2013	ReinMeer Aomori		
2013	FC Osaka		
- * Club domestic league appearances and goals

Wilson Deodato da Silva (born January 10, 1981) is a Brazilian football player.

== Club statistics ==
Club performance			League		Cup		Total	
Season	Club	League	Apps	Goals	Apps	Goals	Apps	Goals
Japan			League		Emperor's Cup		Total	
2005	FC Ryukyu	Kyushu Soccer League			3	1		
2006	FC Ryukyu	JFL	28	4	2	0	30	4
2007	New Wave Kitakyushu	Kyushu Soccer League						
2008	New Wave Kitakyushu	JFL	15	7	2	0	17	7
2009	New Wave Kitakyushu	JFL	23	1	1	0	24	1
2010	Giravanz Kitakyushu	J2 League	3	0	1	0	4	0
Country	Japan		69	12	9	1	75	13
Total			69	12	9	1	75	13
