= Yuya Sato (footballer) =

Japanese footballer

Yuya Sato 佐藤 優也
Personal information
- Full name: Yuya Sato
- Date of birth: February 10, 1986 (age 40)
- Place of birth: Ichikawa, Chiba, Japan
- Height: 1.86 m (6 ft 1 in)
- Position: Goalkeeper

Team information
- Current team: Roasso Kumamoto
- Number: 23

Youth career
- 2001–2003: Ichiritsu Funabashi High School

Senior career*
Years	Team	Apps	(Gls)
2004–2006	Ventforet Kofu	5	(0)
2006–2010	Consadole Sapporo	30	(0)
2011–2012	Giravanz Kitakyushu	79	(0)
2013–2015	Tokyo Verdy	117	(0)
2016–2020	JEF United Chiba	85	(0)
2021–	Roasso Kumamoto	94	(0)
- * Club domestic league appearances and goals as of 23 August 2026

Yuya Sato (佐藤 優也, Satō Yūya; born February 10, 1986) is a Japanese football player who plays for Roasso Kumamoto.

== Career statistics ==
Updated to 10 December 2017.

Appearances and goals by club, season and competition
Club	Season	League			Emperor's Cup		J.League Cup		Total	
Club	Season	Division	Apps	Goals	Apps	Goals	Apps	Goals	Apps	Goals
Ventforet Kofu	2004	J2 League	3	0	0	0	—		3	0
Ventforet Kofu	2005	J2 League	2	0	0	0	—		2	0
Ventforet Kofu	2006	J1 League	0	0	—		0	0	0	0
Consadole Sapporo	2006	J2 League	6	0	4	0	—		10	0
Consadole Sapporo	2007	J2 League	1	0	1	0	—		2	0
Consadole Sapporo	2008	J1 League	15	0	1	0	5	0	21	0
Consadole Sapporo	2009	J2 League	5	0	0	0	—		5	0
Consadole Sapporo	2010	J2 League	3	0	1	0	—		4	0
Giravanz Kitakyushu	2011	J2 League	37	0	2	0	—		39	0
Giravanz Kitakyushu	2012	J2 League	42	0	1	0	—		43	0
Tokyo Verdy	2013	J2 League	42	0	2	0	—		44	0
Tokyo Verdy	2014	J2 League	34	0	0	0	—		34	0
Tokyo Verdy	2015	J2 League	41	0	1	0	—		42	0
JEF United Chiba	2016	J2 League	37	0	1	0	—		38	0
JEF United Chiba	2017	J2 League	35	0	1	0	—		36	0
Career total			303	0	15	0	5	0	323	0
