= Kodai Yasuda =

Japanese footballer

Personal information
- Date of birth: 8 August 1989 (age 37)
- Place of birth: Osaka, Japan
- Height: 1.65 m (5 ft 5 in)
- Position: Midfielder

Youth career
- 2002–2007: Gamba Osaka Youth

Senior career*
Years	Team	Apps	(Gls)
2008–2010	Gamba Osaka	0	(0)
2011–2012	Giravanz Kitakyushu	72	(4)
2013–2015	Tokyo Verdy	31	(1)
2014	→ Gainare Tottori (loan)	16	(1)
2015	→ Ehime FC (loan)	12	(0)
2016–2017	Ehime FC	32	(2)
2018–2022	Nankatsu SC		
Medal record
Gamba Osaka
Winner	AFC Champions League	2008
Runner-up	J1 League	2010
Winner	Emperor's Cup	2008
Winner	Emperor's Cup	2009
- * Club domestic league appearances and goals

Kodai Yasuda (安田 晃大, Yasuda Kōdai; born 8 August 1989 in Suita, Osaka) is a Japanese former footballer who played as a midfielder. His elder brother Michihiro was also a professional footballer.

== Club statistics ==
Appearances and goals by club, season and competition
Club	Season	League			National cup (Note: Includes Emperors Cup)		Other		Total	
Club	Season	Division	Apps	Goals	Apps	Goals	Apps	Goals	Apps	Goals
Gamba Osaka	2009	J.League Division 1	0	0	0	0	–		0	0
Gamba Osaka	2010	J.League Division 1	0	0	0	0	–		0	0
Gamba Osaka	Total		0	0	0	0	0	0	0	0
Giravanz Kitakyushu	2011	J.League Division 2	37	3	2	0	–		39	3
Giravanz Kitakyushu	2012	J.League Division 2	35	1	1	0	–		36	1
Giravanz Kitakyushu	Total		72	4	3	0	0	0	75	4
Tokyo Verdy	2013	J.League Division 2	18	1	1	0	–		19	1
Tokyo Verdy	2014	J.League Division 2	3	0	0	0	–		3	0
Tokyo Verdy	2015	J2 League	10	0	0	0	–		10	0
Tokyo Verdy	Total		31	1	1	0	0	0	32	1
Gainare Tottori (loan)	2014	J3 League	16	1	–		–		16	1
Ehime FC (loan)	2015	J2 League	12	0	0	0	1 (Note: Appearance in J1/J2 play-offs)	0	13	0
Ehime FC	2016	J2 League	20	2	2	0	0	0	22	2
Ehime FC	2017	J2 League	12	0	2	0	0	0	14	0
Ehime FC	Total		32	2	4	0	0	0	36	2
Career total			163	8	8	0	1	0	172	8
