= Kim Jong-pil (footballer, born 1992) =

South Korean footballer

Personal information
- Date of birth: March 9, 1992 (age 34)
- Place of birth: Seoul, South Korea
- Height: 1.82 m (5 ft 11 1/2 in)
- Position: Midfielder

Team information
- Current team: Gyeongnam FC
- Number: 50

Youth career
- 2008–2010: Janghoon High School
- 2008–2009: → Hamburger SV (KFA Youth Project)

Senior career*
Years	Team	Apps	(Gls)
2011–2012	Giravanz Kitakyushu	36	(1)
2013–2014	Tokyo Verdy	61	(2)
2015–2016	Shonan Bellmare	9	(0)
2016	→ Chonburi (loan)	25	(2)
2017–2018	Tokushima Vortis	26	(0)
2019–2023	Gyeongnam FC	31	(2)
2020–2021	→ Jinju Citizen (loan)	26	(0)
2024	Jeonnam Dragons	20	(0)
- * Club domestic league appearances and goals as of 9 November 2024

- Kim Jong-pil
- Hangul: 김종필
- Hanja: 金鐘必
- RR: Gim Jongpil
- MR: Kim Chongp'il

Kim Jong-pil (Korean: 김종필; born March 9, 1992) is a South Korean football player.

== Club statistics ==
As of 9 November 2024.

Appearances and goals by club, season and competition
Club	Season	League			Cup		League Cup		Continental		Other		Total	
Club	Season	Division	Apps	Goals	Apps	Goals	Apps	Goals	Apps	Goals	Apps	Goals	Apps	Goals
Giravanz Kitakyushu	2011	J2 League	18	0	2	0	—		—		—		20	0
Giravanz Kitakyushu	2012	J2 League	18	1	1	0	—		—		—		19	1
Giravanz Kitakyushu	Total		36	1	3	0	—		—		—		39	1
Tokyo Verdy	2013	J2 League	22	2	0	0	—		—		—		22	2
Tokyo Verdy	2014	J2 League	39	0	1	0	—		—		—		40	0
Tokyo Verdy	Total		61	2	1	0	—		—		—		62	2
Shonan Bellmare	2015	J1 League	9	0	1	0	3	0	—		—		13	0
Chonburi (loan)	2016	Thai League 1	25	2	0	0	0	0	—		—		25	2
Tokushima Vortis	2017	J2 League	14	0	0	0	—		—		—		14	0
Tokushima Vortis	2018	J2 League	13	0	0	0	—		—		—		13	0
Tokushima Vortis	Total		27	0	0	0	—		—		—		27	0
Gyeongnam FC	2019	K League 1	22	2	1	0	—		3	0	2	0	28	2
Gyeongnam FC	2021	K League 2	2	0	—		—		—		—		2	0
Gyeongnam FC	2022	K League 2	7	0	1	0	—		—		0	0	8	0
Gyeongnam FC	2023	K League 2	0	0	2	0	—		—		0	0	2	0
Gyeongnam FC	Total		31	2	4	0	—		3	0	0	0	38	2
Jinju Citizen (loan)	2020	K4 League	14	0	0	0	—		—		—		14	0
Jinju Citizen (loan)	2021	K4 League	12	0	1	0	—		—		—		13	0
Jinju Citizen (loan)	Total		26	0	1	0	—		—		—		27	0
Jeonnam Dragons	2024	K League 2	20	0	0	0	—		—		2	0	22	0
Total			235	7	10	0	3	0	3	0	2	0	253	7
