= Ryohei Arai (footballer) =

Japanese footballer (born 1990)

Ryohei Arai 新井涼平
Personal information
- Full name: Ryohei Arai
- Date of birth: 3 November 1990 (age 36)
- Place of birth: Ōi, Saitama, Japan
- Height: 1.83 m (6 ft 0 in)
- Position: Defensive midfielder

Youth career
- 2003–2008: Omiya Ardija

Senior career*
Years	Team	Apps	(Gls)
2009–2010	Omiya Ardija	5	(0)
2010–2011	FC Gifu	31	(0)
2012	Giravanz Kitakyushu	34	(1)
2013–2022	Ventforet Kofu	208	(4)
2022–2024	Sukhothai	48	(1)
- * Club domestic league appearances and goals as of 03:24, 19 January 2024

Ryohei Arai (新井 涼平, Arai Ryōhei; born 3 November 1990) is a Japanese footballer who plays as a defensive midfielder.

== Early life ==
Ryohei was born in Ōi. He played for Omiya Ardija in his youth.

== Career ==
Ryohei made his league debut for Omiya against Shimizu S-Pulse on 8 March 2009.

Ryohei made his league debut for Gifu against Roasso Kumamoto on 8 August 2010.

Ryohei made his league debut for Giravanz against Tokushima Vortis on 4 March 2012. He scored his first goal for the club against Fagiano Okayama on 22 August 2012, scoring in the 19th minute.

Ryohei made his league debut for Ventforet against Cerezo Osaka on 9 March 2013. He scored his first goal for the club against Sanfrecce Hiroshima on 22 November 2014, scoring in the 77th minute.

Ryohei made his league debut for Sukhothai against PT Prachuap on 14 August 2022.

== Career statistics ==
Updated to 2 July 2022.

Appearances and goals by club, season and competition
Club	Season	League			Emperor's Cup		J.League Cup		Total	
Club	Season	Division	Apps	Goals	Apps	Goals	Apps	Goals	Apps	Goals
Omiya Ardija	2009	J1 League	5	0	0	0	4	0	9	0
Omiya Ardija	2010	J1 League	0	0	-		0	0	0	0
FC Gifu	2010	J2 League	12	0	1	0	-		13	0
FC Gifu	2011	J2 League	19	0	0	0	-		19	0
Giravanz Kitakyushu	2012	J2 League	34	1	1	0	-		35	1
Ventforet Kofu	2013	J1 League	3	0	1	0	2	0	6	0
Ventforet Kofu	2014	J1 League	32	1	2	0	4	0	38	1
Ventforet Kofu	2015	J1 League	25	0	3	0	3	0	31	0
Ventforet Kofu	2016	J1 League	20	0	0	0	4	0	24	0
Ventforet Kofu	2017	J1 League	30	0	0	0	1	0	31	0
Ventforet Kofu	2018	J2 League	9	0	0	0	1	0	10	0
Ventforet Kofu	2019	J2 League	19	0	2	0	0	0	21	0
Ventforet Kofu	2020	J2 League	29	0	0	0	0	0	29	0
Ventforet Kofu	2021	J2 League	39	0	0	0	0	0	39	0
Ventforet Kofu	2022	J2 League	2	0	0	0	0	0	2	0
Career total			208	4	10	0	19	0	231	4
