= Felipe Barros =

Brazilian footballer (born 1994)

Personal information
- Full name: Felipe de Oliveira Barros
- Date of birth: 5 August 1994 (age 32)
- Place of birth: Recife, Brazil
- Height: 1.94 m (6 ft 4 in)
- Position: Centre-back

Youth career
- 2009–2013: São Paulo

Senior career*
Years	Team	Apps	(Gls)
2014–2017	Yokohama	3	(0)
2015–2016	→ Farense (loan)	23	(3)
2016–2017	→ Santa Clara (loan)	7	(1)
2017–2018	Penapolense		
2018	Grêmio Novorizontino	3	(0)
2019	Cascavel		
2019	Batatais	0	(0)
2020–2021	Ríver		
- * Club domestic league appearances and goals as of 12:23, 3 June 2019 (UTC)

Felipe de Oliveira Barros (born 5 August 1994) is a Brazilian former professional footballer who played as a centre-back.

== Career ==
Barros played for J2 League club; Yokohama FC from 2014 to 2015.
