= Jin Hanato =

Japanese footballer (born 1990)

Jin Hanato 端戸 仁
Personal information
- Full name: Jin Hanato
- Date of birth: 31 May 1990 (age 36)
- Place of birth: Asahi-ku, Kanagawa, Japan
- Height: 1.74 m (5 ft 8 1/2 in)
- Position: Forward

Team information
- Current team: Kagoshima United FC
- Number: 25

Youth career
- 2003–2009: Yokohama F. Marinos Youth

Senior career*
Years	Team	Apps	(Gls)
2009–2015	Yokohama F. Marinos	34	(2)
2012	→ Giravanz Kitakyushu (loan)	39	(14)
2016–2019	Shonan Bellmare	51	(5)
2019	→ Tokyo Verdy (loan)	20	(1)
2020–2022	Tokyo Verdy	59	(12)
2022	→ Kagoshima United (loan)	10	(1)
2023–2024	Kagoshima United	37	(8)

International career
2007	Japan U-17	3	(0)
Medal record
Yokohama F. Marinos
Runner-up	J1 League	2013
Winner	Emperor's Cup	2013
Shonan Bellmare
Winner	J.League Cup	2018
Representing Japan
AFC U-16 Championship
Gold medal – first place	2006 Singapore
- * Club domestic league appearances and goals as of 19:43, 19 July 2022 (UTC)

Jin Hanato (端戸 仁, Hanato Jin; born 31 May 1990) is a Japanese football former player who played as a forward.

Hanato started his career with Yokohama F. Marinos, and made 250 league appearances in the J League system, mainly in the J2 League.

== Career ==
Hanato started his career at Yokohama F.Marinos, making 34 league appearances and scoring two goals. He joined Giravanz Kitakyushu on loan in 2012, and scored 14 goals in 39 league appearances. He remained with Yokohama F.Marinos until 2016.

During his time at Yokohama F.Marinos, Hanato played in the AFC Champions League Elite. He scored against Guangzhou Evergrande on 12 March 2014, scoring in the 21st minute.

On 23 December 2015, Hanato was announced at Shonan Bellmare on a permanent transfer.

On 29 December 2018, Hanato was announced at Tokyo Verdy on a one year loan deal. On 9 January 2020, Hanato was announced at Tokyo Verdy on a permanent deal. During the 2020 season, he made 25 league appearances and scored 6 goals.

On 11 August 2022, Hanato was announced at Kagoshima United on a six month loan deal.

On 19 December 2022, Hanato was announced at Kagoshima United on a permanent transfer. On 4 November 2024, the club announced he would not be extending his contract for the 2025 season.

On 18 December 2024, Hanato announced his retirement from football.

== Personal life ==
During his time at Yokohama F. Marinos, Hanato owned a pet dog. His surname, Hanato, is an extremely uncommon surname in Japan, with only around 20 people sharing the surname.

== Career statistics ==
Updated to 19 July 2022.

Club performance			League		Cup		League Cup		Continental		Total	
Season	Club	League	Apps	Goals	Apps	Goals	Apps	Goals	Apps	Goals	Apps	Goals
Japan			League		Emperor's Cup		J. League Cup		AFC		Total	
2009	Yokohama F. Marinos	J1 League	0	0	0	0	0	0	–		0	0
2010	Yokohama F. Marinos	J1 League	10	1	2	0	0	0	–		12	1
2011	Yokohama F. Marinos	J1 League	0	0	0	0	0	0	–		0	0
2012	Giravanz Kitakyushu	J2 League	39	14	1	0	–		–		40	14
2013	Yokohama F. Marinos	J1 League	15	1	6	0	4	0	–		0	0
2014	Yokohama F. Marinos	J1 League	6	0	2	1	0	0	2	1	10	2
2015	Yokohama F. Marinos	J1 League	3	0	2	0	0	0	–		5	0
2016	Shonan Bellmare	J1 League	20	4	0	0	2	1	–		22	5
2017	Shonan Bellmare	J2 League	27	1	1	0	–		–		28	1
2018	Shonan Bellmare	J1 League	4	0	3	0	6	1	–		13	1
2019	Tokyo Verdy (loan)	J2 League	20	1	0	0	–		–		20	1
2020	Tokyo Verdy	J2 League	25	6	–		–		–		25	6
2021	Tokyo Verdy	J2 League	29	5	1	0	–		–		30	5
2022	Tokyo Verdy	J2 League	5	0	0	0	–		–		5	0
Total			206	33	18	1	12	2	2	1	238	37

== Awards and honours ==
Shonan Bellmare

- J2 League: 2017

Yokohama F. Marinos

- Emperor's Cup: 2013

=== Japan ===
- AFC U-17 Championship: 2006
