= Yuji Kimura =

Japanese footballer

Yuji Kimura 木村 祐志
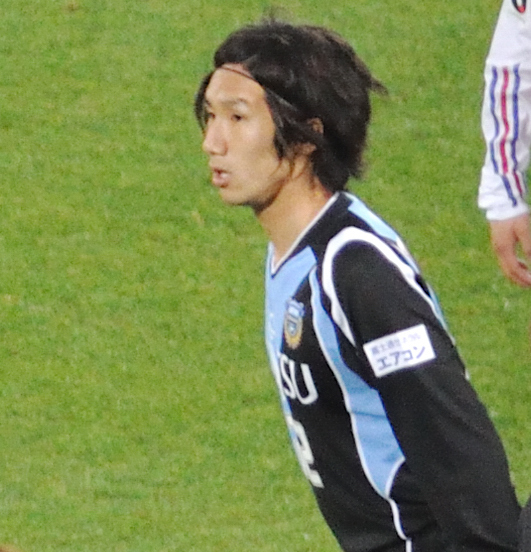

Personal information
- Full name: Yuji Kimura
- Date of birth: 5 October 1987 (age 39)
- Place of birth: Minato, Tokyo, Japan
- Height: 1.77 m (5 ft 10 in)
- Position: Midfielder

Team information
- Current team: Kagoshima United FC
- Number: 30

Youth career
- 2000–2005: Kawasaki Frontale Youth

Senior career*
| Years | Team | Apps | (Gls) |
| 2006–2010 | Kawasaki Frontale | 7 | (0) |
| 2011–2012 | Giravanz Kitakyushu | 79 | (3) |
| 2013–2014 | Oita Trinita | 45 | (1) |
| 2015–2017 | Tokushima Vortis | 75 | (8) |
| 2017 | → Roasso Kumamoto (loan) | 6 | (0) |
| 2018–2021 | Mito HollyHock | 119 | (8) |
| 2022– | Kagoshima United | 4 | (0) |
Medal record
Kawasaki Frontale
| Runner-up | J1 League | 2006 |
| Runner-up | J1 League | 2008 |
| Runner-up | J1 League | 2009 |
| Runner-up | J.League Cup | 2007 |
| Runner-up | J.League Cup | 2009 |
- * Club domestic league appearances and goals as of 17:35 @ 9 January 2024

Yuji Kimura (木村 祐志, Kimura Yūji; born 5 October 1987 in Minato, Tokyo) is a Japanese footballer who plays as a midfielder for J3 League club Kagoshima United FC.

== Career ==
Ahead of the 2024 J2 League season, Kimura was named captain of Kagoshima United.

== Career statistics ==
Updated to end of 2018 season.

| Club performance | | | League | | Cup | | League Cup | | Continental | | Total | |
| Season | Club | League | Apps | Goals | Apps | Goals | Apps | Goals | Apps | Goals | Apps | Goals |
| Japan | | | League | | Emperor's Cup | | League Cup | | AFC | | Total | |
|---|---|---|---|---|---|---|---|---|---|---|---|---|
| 2006 | Kawasaki Frontale | J1 League | 0 | 0 | 0 | 0 | 0 | 0 | - | | 0 | 0 |
| 2007 | Kawasaki Frontale | J1 League | 0 | 0 | 0 | 0 | 0 | 0 | 1 | 0 | 1 | 0 |
| 2008 | Kawasaki Frontale | J1 League | 0 | 0 | 0 | 0 | 2 | 0 | - | | 2 | 0 |
| 2009 | Kawasaki Frontale | J1 League | 2 | 0 | 4 | 1 | 0 | 0 | 1 | 0 | 7 | 1 |
| 2010 | Kawasaki Frontale | J1 League | 5 | 0 | 1 | 1 | 0 | 0 | 3 | 0 | 9 | 1 |
| 2011 | Giravanz Kitakyushu | J2 League | 38 | 2 | 2 | 0 | - | | - | | 40 | 2 |
| 2012 | Giravanz Kitakyushu | J2 League | 41 | 1 | 1 | 0 | - | | - | | 42 | 1 |
| 2013 | Oita Trinita | J1 League | 24 | 1 | 4 | 0 | 3 | 0 | - | | 31 | 1 |
| 2014 | Oita Trinita | J2 League | 21 | 0 | 1 | 0 | - | | - | | 22 | 0 |
| 2015 | Tokushima Vortis | J2 League | 30 | 5 | 0 | 0 | - | | - | | 30 | 5 |
| 2016 | Tokushima Vortis | J2 League | 41 | 3 | 2 | 0 | - | | - | | 43 | 3 |
| 2017 | Tokushima Vortis | J2 League | 4 | 0 | 1 | 0 | - | | - | | 5 | 0 |
| 2017 | Roasso Kumamoto | J2 League | 6 | 0 | - | | - | | - | | 6 | 0 |
| 2018 | Mito HollyHock | J2 League | 39 | 5 | 0 | 0 | - | | - | | 39 | 5 |
| Career total | | | 251 | 17 | 16 | 2 | 5 | 0 | 5 | 0 | 267 | 19 |
