= Shinya Sato (footballer) =

Japanese footballer

Personal information
- Full name: Shinya Sato
- Date of birth: November 13, 1978 (age 47)
- Place of birth: Kumamoto, Kumamoto, Japan
- Height: 1.77 m (5 ft 9 1/2 in)
- Position: Midfielder

Youth career
- 1997–2000: Saga University

Senior career*
Years	Team	Apps	(Gls)
2001–2002	Okinawa Kariyushi FC		
2003–2007	FC Ryukyu		
2008–2011	Giravanz Kitakyushu	82	(4)
- * Club domestic league appearances and goals

Shinya Sato (佐藤 真也, Satō Shin'ya; born November 13, 1978) is a former Japanese football player.

== Club statistics ==
Club performance			League		Cup		League Cup		Total	
Season	Club	League	Apps	Goals	Apps	Goals	Apps	Goals	Apps	Goals
Japan			League		Emperor's Cup		League Cup		Total	
2001	Okinawa Kariyushi FC	Prefectural Leagues					-			
2002	Okinawa Kariyushi FC	Regional Leagues					-			
2003	FC Ryukyu	Prefectural Leagues			-		-			
2004	FC Ryukyu	Prefectural Leagues					-			
2005	FC Ryukyu	Regional Leagues			3	0	-			
2006	FC Ryukyu	Football League	26	0	2	0	-		28	0
2007	FC Ryukyu	Football League	31	0	-		-		31	0
2008	New Wave Kitakyushu	Football League	33	3	1	0	-		34	3
2009	New Wave Kitakyushu	Football League	25	0	1	0	-		26	0
2010	Giravanz Kitakyushu	J2 League					-			
Career total							0	0		
