= Yuki Fuji =

Japanese footballer (born 1981)

Personal information
- Date of birth: May 7, 1981 (age 45)
- Place of birth: Fujimi, Saitama, Japan
- Height: 1.79 m (5 ft 10 1/2 in)
- Positions: Midfielder; left back

Team information
- Current team: Suzuka Unlimited FC
- Number: 5

Youth career
- 2000–2003: Kokushikan University

Senior career*
Years	Team	Apps	(Gls)
2004–2007	Otsuka Pharmaceuticals; Tokushima Vortis	52	(1)
2008–2014	New Wave Kitakyushu; Giravanz Kitakyushu	186	(16)
2015–2016	FC Gifu	31	(1)
2017–	Suzuka Unlimited FC		
- * Club domestic league appearances and goals as of 23 February 2017

Yuki Fuji (冨士 祐樹, Fuji Yūki; born May 7, 1981 in Fujimi, Saitama) is a Japanese football player for Suzuka Unlimited FC.

== Club career statistics ==
Updated to 23 February 2017.

Club performance			League		Cup		League Cup		Total	
Season	Club	League	Apps	Goals	Apps	Goals	Apps	Goals	Apps	Goals
Japan			League		Emperor's Cup		League Cup		Total	
2000	Kokushikan University	JFL	0	0			-		0	0
2001	Kokushikan University	JFL	24	0			-		24	0
2002	Kokushikan University	JFL	9	1			-		9	1
2003	Kokushikan University	JFL	9	0			-		9	0
2004	Otsuka Pharmaceuticals	JFL	13	0	1	0	-		14	0
2005	Tokushima Vortis	J.League 2	28	1	2	0	-		30	1
2006	Tokushima Vortis	J.League 2	3	0	0	0	-		3	0
2007	Tokushima Vortis	J.League 2	8	0	0	0	-		8	0
2008	New Wave Kitakyushu	JFL	33	6	3	0	-		36	6
2009	New Wave Kitakyushu	JFL	28	3	1	0	-		29	3
2010	Giravanz Kitakyushu	J2 League	9	1	0	0	-		9	1
2011	Giravanz Kitakyushu	J2 League	27	0	2	0	-		29	0
2012	Giravanz Kitakyushu	J2 League	18	0	0	0	-		18	0
2013	Giravanz Kitakyushu	J2 League	32	2	1	0	-		33	2
2014	Giravanz Kitakyushu	J2 League	39	4	3	0	-		42	4
2015	FC Gifu	J2 League	21	0	2	0	-		23	0
2016	FC Gifu	J2 League	10	1	1	0	-		11	1
Total			311	19	16	0	-		337	19
