= Hwang Te-song =

South Korean footballer

Hwang Te-Song
Personal information
- Full name: Hwang Te-Song
- Date of birth: December 20, 1989 (age 36)
- Place of birth: Gunma, Japan
- Height: 1.85 m (6 ft 1 in)
- Position: Defender

Senior career*
Years	Team	Apps	(Gls)
2012–2015	Kyoto Sanga FC	8	(0)
- * Club domestic league appearances and goals

Hwang Te-Song (born December 20, 1989) is a South Korean football player.
