= Takayuki Tada =

Japanese footballer

Personal information
- Date of birth: April 7, 1988 (age 38)
- Place of birth: Kagawa, Japan
- Height: 1.75 m (5 ft 9 in)
- Position: Midfielder

Youth career
- 2007–2010: National Institute of Fitness and Sports in Kanoya

Senior career*
Years	Team	Apps	(Gls)
2010–2016	Giravanz Kitakyushu	103	(1)
- * Club domestic league appearances and goals

Takayuki Tada (多田 高行, born April 7, 1988) is a Japanese football player.

== Club statistics ==
Updated to 23 February 2016.

Club performance			League		Cup		Total	
Season	Club	League	Apps	Goals	Apps	Goals	Apps	Goals
Japan			League		Emperor's Cup		Total	
2010	Giravanz Kitakyushu	J2 League	5	0	0	0	5	0
2011	Giravanz Kitakyushu	J2 League	27	0	2	0	29	0
2012	Giravanz Kitakyushu	J2 League	22	1	1	0	23	1
2013	Giravanz Kitakyushu	J2 League	13	0	0	0	13	0
2014	Giravanz Kitakyushu	J2 League	12	0	2	0	14	0
2015	Giravanz Kitakyushu	J2 League	15	0	1	0	16	0
Total			94	1	6	0	100	1
