= Tomoki Ikemoto =

Japanese footballer

Tomoki Ikemoto 池元 友樹
Personal information
- Full name: Tomoki Ikemoto
- Date of birth: 27 March 1985 (age 41)
- Place of birth: Kitakyūshū, Fukuoka, Japan
- Height: 1.70 m (5 ft 7 in)
- Position: Forward

Team information
- Current team: Giravanz Kitakyushu
- Number: 11

Youth career
- 2000–2002: Higashi Fukuoka High School
- 2003–2004: River Plate

Senior career*
Years	Team	Apps	(Gls)
2005–2006	New Wave Kitakyushu	26	(27)
2006	FC Gifu	0	(0)
2007	Kashiwa Reysol	1	(0)
2008–2009	Yokohama FC	72	(11)
2010–2014	Giravanz Kitakyushu	172	(41)
2015	Matsumoto Yamaga	8	(1)
2016–2020	Giravanz Kitakyushu	111	(34)
- * Club domestic league appearances and goals

Tomoki Ikemoto (池元 友樹, Ikemoto Tomoki; born 27 March 1985 in Kitakyūshū, Fukuoka) was a Japanese footballer who played for Giravanz Kitakyushu before his retirement at the end of the 2020 season.

== Club career statistics ==
Updated to 1 January 2026.

Club performance			League		Cup		League Cup		Total	
Season	Club	League	Apps	Goals	Apps	Goals	Apps	Goals	Apps	Goals
Japan			League		Emperor's Cup		League Cup		Total	
2005	New Wave; Kitakyushu	JRL (Kyushu)	10	15	-		-		10	15
2006	New Wave; Kitakyushu	JRL (Kyushu)	16	12	-		-		16	12
2006	F.C. Gifu	JRL (Tokai)	0	0	-		-		0	0
2007	Kashiwa Reysol	J1 League	1	0	0	0	1	0	2	0
2008	Yokohama FC	J2 League	32	7	2	1	-		34	8
2009	Yokohama FC	J2 League	40	4	0	0	-		40	4
2010	Giravanz Kitakyushu	J2 League	31	2	2	0	-		33	2
2011	Giravanz Kitakyushu	J2 League	36	10	1	1	-		37	11
2012	Giravanz Kitakyushu	J2 League	34	7	1	0	-		35	7
2013	Giravanz Kitakyushu	J2 League	29	7	2	0	-		31	7
2014	Giravanz Kitakyushu	J2 League	42	15	4	0	-		46	15
2015	Matsumoto Yamaga	J1 League	8	1	1	0	4	1	13	2
2016	Giravanz Kitakyushu	J2 League	25	6	0	0	-		25	6
2017	Giravanz Kitakyushu	J3 League	32	16	1	0	-		33	16
2018	Giravanz Kitakyushu	J3 League	20	5	-		-		20	5
2019	Giravanz Kitakyushu	J3 League	34	7	2	1	-		36	8
2020	Giravanz Kitakyushu	J2 League	16	1	-		-		16	1
Career total			390	114	16	3	5	1	411	118
