= Mitsuhiro Seki =

Japanese footballer

Mitsuhiro Seki 関 光博
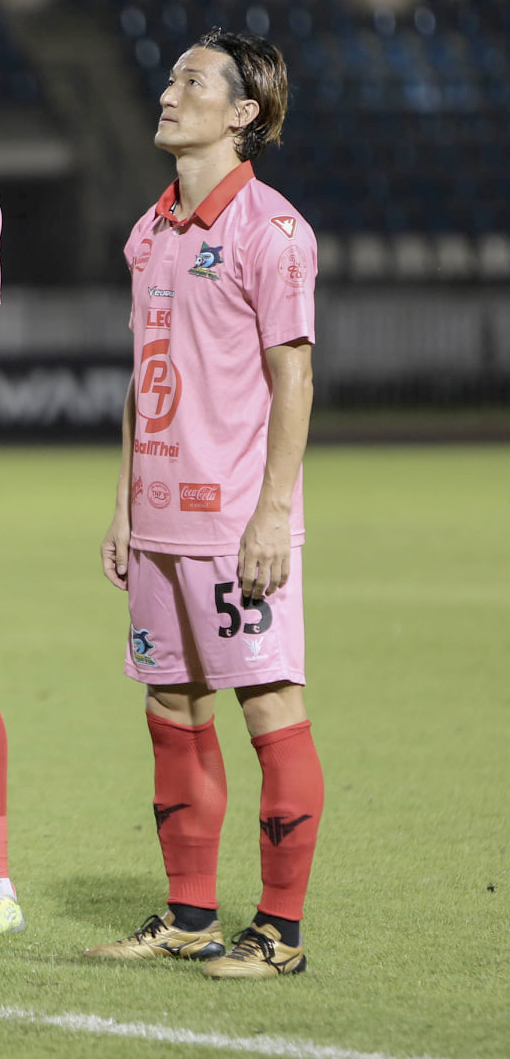
- Mitsuhiro Seki playing for Ranong United.

Personal information
- Full name: Mitsuhiro Seki
- Date of birth: May 8, 1982 (age 44)
- Place of birth: Machida, Tokyo, Japan
- Height: 1.72 m (5 ft 8 in)
- Position: Midfielder

Youth career
- 2001–2004: Komazawa University

Senior career*
Years	Team	Apps	(Gls)
2005–2008	Roasso Kumamoto	66	(11)
2009–2012	Giravanz Kitakyushu	124	(9)
2013	Tokyo Verdy	9	(1)
2014–2017	Kagoshima United FC	76	(1)
2018–2019	Fujieda MYFC	0	(0)
2020	Trang F.C.	2	(1)
2022	Ranong United	15	(0)
- * Club domestic league appearances and goals as of 4 May 2022

Mitsuhiro Seki (関 光博, Seki Mitsuhiro; born May 8, 1982) is a Japanese footballer. Seki previously played for Roasso Kumamoto in the J2 League.

== Career statistics ==
Updated to 23 February 2018.

Appearances and goals by club, season and competition
Club	Season	League			Emperor's Cup		Total	
Club	Season	Division	Apps	Goals	Apps	Goals	Apps	Goals
Rosso Kumamoto	2005	JRL	18	7	1	0	19	7
Rosso Kumamoto	2006	JFL	28	4	1	0	29	4
Rosso Kumamoto	2007	JFL	17	0	0	0	17	0
Roasso Kumamoto	2008	J2 League	3	0	0	0	3	0
New Wave Kitakyushu	2009	JFL	22	4	1	0	23	4
Giravanz Kitakyushu	2010	J2 League	33	2	1	0	34	2
Giravanz Kitakyushu	2011	J2 League	36	3	2	0	38	3
Giravanz Kitakyushu	2012	J2 League	33	0	0	0	33	0
Tokyo Verdy	2013	J2 League	9	1	2	1	11	2
Kagoshima United FC	2014	JFL	7	1	–		7	1
Kagoshima United FC	2015	JFL	14	0	1	0	15	0
Kagoshima United FC	2016	J3 League	29	0	1	0	30	0
Kagoshima United FC	2017	J3 League	26	0	1	2	27	2
Total			275	22	11	3	286	25
