= Satoshi Nagano =

Japanese footballer

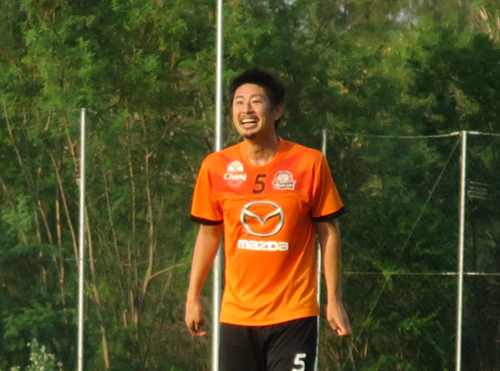

Personal information
- Full name: Satoshi Nagano
- Date of birth: August 2, 1982 (age 44)
- Place of birth: Saigawa, Fukuoka, Japan
- Height: 1.85 m (6 ft 1 in)
- Position: Defender

Youth career
- 1998–2000: Fukuoka Daiichi High School
- 2001–2004: Fukuoka University

Senior career*
| Years | Team | Apps | (Gls) |
| 2005–2009 | Avispa Fukuoka | 96 | (2) |
| 2006 | →Tokyo Verdy (loan) | 7 | (0) |
| 2010–2012 | Giravanz Kitakyushu | 66 | (2) |
| 2013–2016 | Nakhon Ratchasima | 114 | (6) |
| 2017 | Bangkok | 22 | (2) |
| Total | | 283 | (10) |
- * Club domestic league appearances and goals

Satoshi Nagano (長野 聡, Nagano Satoshi; born August 2, 1982) is a Japanese football player.

== Club statistics ==
| Club performance | | | League | | Cup | | League Cup | | Total | |
| Season | Club | League | Apps | Goals | Apps | Goals | Apps | Goals | Apps | Goals |
| Japan | | | League | | Emperor's Cup | | League Cup | | Total | |
|---|---|---|---|---|---|---|---|---|---|---|
| 2005 | Avispa Fukuoka | J2 League | 18 | 1 | 2 | 0 | - | | 20 | 1 |
| 2006 | Avispa Fukuoka | J1 League | 3 | 0 | - | | 4 | 0 | 7 | 0 |
| 2006 | Tokyo Verdy | J2 League | 7 | 0 | 0 | 0 | - | | 7 | 0 |
| 2007 | Avispa Fukuoka | J2 League | 29 | 0 | 1 | 0 | - | | 30 | 0 |
| 2008 | Avispa Fukuoka | J2 League | 27 | 1 | 0 | 0 | - | | 27 | 1 |
| 2009 | Avispa Fukuoka | J2 League | 19 | 0 | 2 | 0 | - | | 21 | 0 |
| 2010 | Giravanz Kitakyushu | J2 League | 33 | 0 | 1 | 0 | - | | 34 | 0 |
| 2011 | Giravanz Kitakyushu | J2 League | 28 | 2 | 1 | 0 | - | | 29 | 2 |
| 2012 | Giravanz Kitakyushu | J2 League | 5 | 0 | 0 | 0 | - | | 5 | 0 |
| Career total | | | 169 | 4 | 7 | 0 | 4 | 0 | 180 | 4 |
