= Ryosuke Kawanabe =

Japanese footballer

Personal information
- Full name: Ryosuke Kawanabe
- Date of birth: February 26, 1986 (age 40)
- Place of birth: Kasukabe, Saitama, Japan
- Height: 1.83 m (6 ft 0 in)
- Position: Centre back

Team information
- Current team: Gainare Tottori
- Number: 3

Youth career
- 1998–2003: Urawa Red Diamonds
- 2004–2007: Aoyama Gakuin University

Senior career*
Years	Team	Apps	(Gls)
2008	Tochigi SC	24	(1)
2009–2012	Giravanz Kitakyushu	73	(2)
2013	Matsumoto Yamaga	18	(0)
2014	Nagano Parceiro	23	(1)
2015–	Gainare Tottori	27	(1)
- * Club domestic league appearances and goals as of 23 February 2016

Ryosuke Kawanabe (川鍋 良祐, Kawanabe Ryōsuke; born February 26, 1986 in Kasukabe, Saitama) is a Japanese football player currently playing for Gainare Tottori.

== Club career stats ==
Updated to 23 February 2016.

Appearances and goals by club, season and competition
Club	Season	League			Emperor's Cup		J.League Cup		Total	
Club	Season	Division	Apps	Goals	Apps	Goals	Apps	Goals	!Apps	Goals
Tochigi SC	2008	JFL	24	1	0	0	—		24	1
New Wave Kitakyushu	2009	JFL	28	2	1	0	—		29	2
Giravanz Kitakyushu	2010	J2 League	19	0	1	0	—		20	0
Giravanz Kitakyushu	2011	J2 League	10	0	0	0	—		10	0
Giravanz Kitakyushu	2012	J2 League	16	0	1	0	—		17	0
Matsumoto Yamaga	2013	J2 League	18	0	1	0	—		19	0
Nagano Parceiro	2014	J3 League	23	1	1	0	—		24	1
Gainare Tottori	2015	J3 League	27	1	2	0	—		29	1
Career total			165	5	7	0	0	0	172	5
