= Leonardo Moreira =

Brazilian footballer

Leonardo Moreira 盛礼良 レオナルド
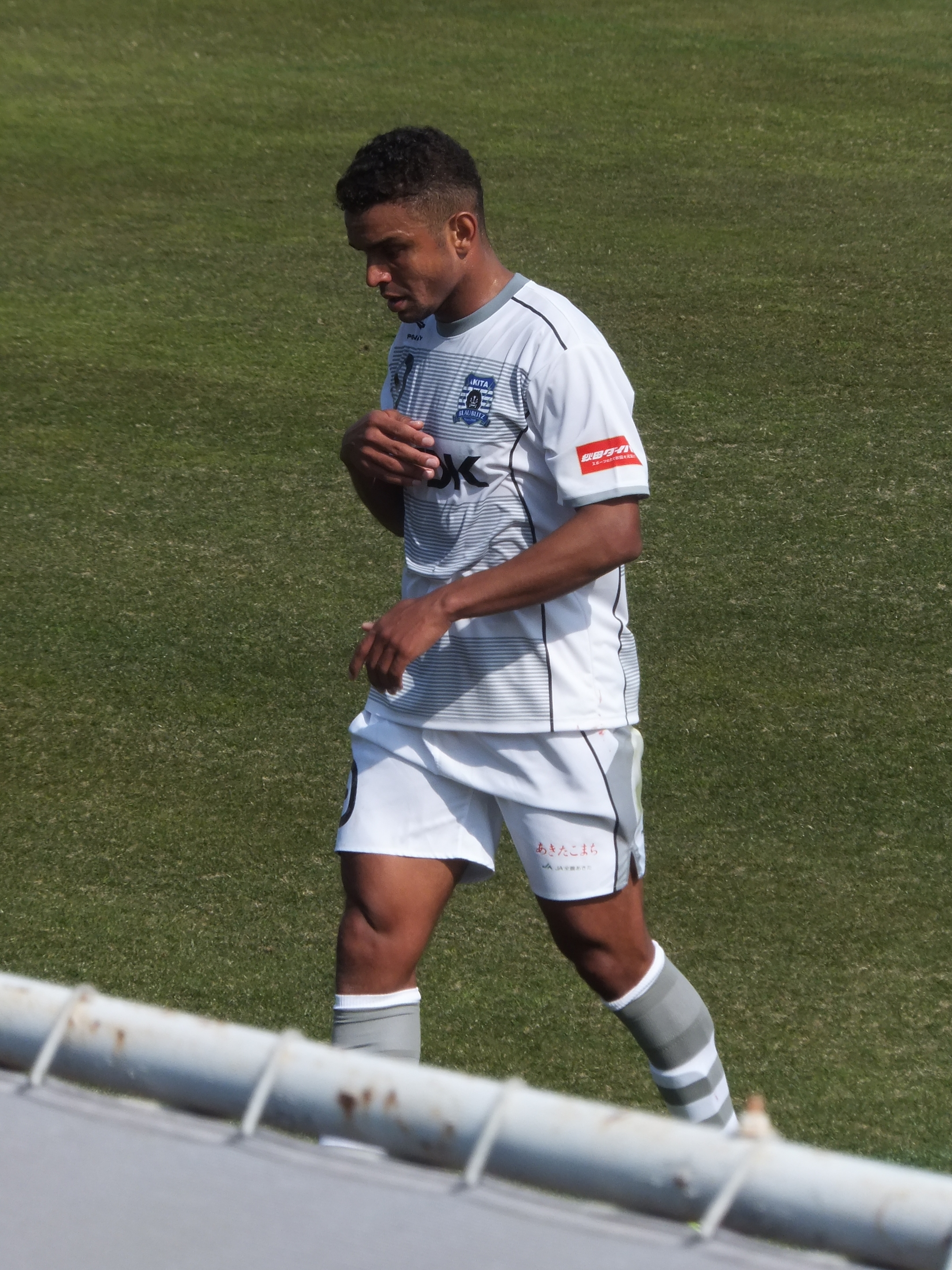

Personal information
- Full name: Leonardo Moreira
- Date of birth: 4 February 1986 (age 40)
- Place of birth: Minas Gerais, Brazil
- Height: 1.75 m (5 ft 9 in)
- Position: Forward

Team information
- Current team: Machida Zelvia (interpreter and first team coach)

Youth career
- 2002–2004: Aomori Yamada High School

Senior career*
Years	Team	Apps	(Gls)
2005–2006	Japan Soccer College	13	(13)
2007–2008	Sagan Tosu	54	(9)
2009	Tokyo Verdy	3	(0)
2009–2010	Tochigi SC	24	(1)
2010–2012	Giravanz Kitakyushu	71	(10)
2013	Japan Soccer College	14	(23)
2014–2015	Blaublitz Akita	42	(10)
2016	ReinMeer Aomori	24	(2)
2017–2020	Maruyasu Okazaki	57	(14)
2021–2023	Veertien Mie	0	(0)
- * Club domestic league appearances and goals as of 12 December 2023, 14:22 (UTC)

Leonardo Moreira (盛礼良 レオナルド, Moreira Reonarudo; born 4 February 1986) is a Brazilian football coach and former player who played as a forward. He is the Interpreter and first team coach of J1 League club Machida Zelvia.

== Club career ==
In 2020, Moreira left Maruyasu Okazaki after four years at the club.

In 2023, Moreira announcement officially retirement from football.

== Coaching career ==
On 4 January 2024, Moreira was appointed as interpreter and first team coach of Machida Zelvia.

== Personal life ==
On 17 July 2015, Moreira was obtained a Japanese citizenship.

His former name when he was a Brazilian was Leonardo Augusto Vieira Moreira (レオナルド・アウグスト・ヴィエイラ・モレイラ).

== Club statistics ==
As of 2 February 2021.

Club	Season	League		Emperor's Cup		J.League Cup		Total	
Club	Season	Apps	Goals	Apps	Goals	Apps	Goals	Apps	Goals
Japan Soccer College	2005	0	0	1	0	-		1	0
Japan Soccer College	2006	13	13	1	0	-		14	13
Sagan Tosu	2007	27	5	3	0	-		30	5
Sagan Tosu	2008	27	4	2	0	-		29	4
Tokyo Verdy	2009	3	0	-		-		3	0
Tochigi SC	2009	14	1	1	0	-		15	1
Tochigi SC	2010	10	0	-		-		10	0
Giravanz Kitakyushu	2010	16	2	2	0	-		18	2
Giravanz Kitakyushu	2011	32	5	1	0	-		33	5
Giravanz Kitakyushu	2012	13	3	0	0	-		13	3
Japan Soccer College	2013	14	23	-		-		14	23
Blaublitz Akita	2014	26	8	2	2	-		28	10
Blaublitz Akita	2015	16	2	2	0	-		18	2
ReinMeer Aomori	2016	24	2	–		–		24	2
FC Maruyasu Okazaki	2017	28	8	1	2	–		29	10
FC Maruyasu Okazaki	2018	19	6	0	0	–		19	6
FC Maruyasu Okazaki	2019	6	0	0	0	–		6	0
FC Maruyasu Okazaki	2020	4	0	0	0	–		4	0
Career total		292	82	17	4	-		309	86
