= 2014 J.League Division 2 =

J.League Division 2
- Season: 2014
- Champions: Shonan Bellmare; 1st J2 title 3rd D2 title
- Promoted: Shonan Bellmare; Matsumoto Yamaga; Montedio Yamagata
- Relegated: Kataller Toyama
- Matches: 462
- Goals: 1,124 (2.43 per match)
- Top goalscorer: Masashi Oguro (26 goals)
- Highest attendance: 20,636; Trinita vs Roasso
- Lowest attendance: 1,450; Kamatamare vs Tochigi SC
- Average attendance: 6,589

The 2014 J.League Division 2 season was the 43rd season of the second-tier club football in Japan and the 16th season since the establishment of J2 League. The season commenced on 2 March and ended on 23 November. Post-season promotion and relegation playoffs were played until 7 December.

== Clubs ==
Gamba Osaka and Vissel Kobe have stayed in the second division for just a year, winning a promotion as champions and runners-up respectively. Fourth-placed Tokushima Vortis won the promotion playoffs and become the very first Shikoku club to play in the top flight since the establishment of Japan Soccer League, the first amateur nationwide football league in Japan. Shonan Bellmare and Oita Trinita were relegated from the first division immediately after promotion, and Júbilo Iwata have suffered their debut relegation after 20 years in the first division.

On the other end of the table, Kamatamare Sanuki have been promoted from 2013 Japan Football League, replacing Gainare Tottori whom they defeated in the J2–JFL playoffs.

On 29 September the J.League licensing board issued J1 licenses to all J2 clubs except Mito HollyHock, FC Gifu, and Giravanz Kitakyushu. This means these three clubs are not eligible to play in J1 for 2015 season and therefore cannot be promoted directly or via playoffs.

Locations of the 2014 J.League 2 teams

The participating clubs are listed in the following table:

Club name	Home town(s)	Note(s)
Avispa Fukuoka	Fukuoka	
Shonan Bellmare	Hiratsuka, Kanagawa	Relegated from J1 League in 2013
Consadole Sapporo	Sapporo, Hokkaidō	
Ehime FC	All cities/towns in Ehime	
Fagiano Okayama	All cities/towns in Okayama	
FC Gifu	All cities/towns in Gifu	Not eligible for J1 promotion
Giravanz Kitakyushu	Kitakyushu, Fukuoka	Not eligible for J1 promotion
Mito HollyHock	Mito, Ibaraki	Not eligible for J1 promotion
JEF United Chiba	Chiba & Ichihara, Chiba	
Júbilo Iwata	Iwata, Shizuoka	Relegated from J1 League in 2013
Kamatamare Sanuki	Takamatsu, Kagawa	Promoted from JFL in 2013
Kataller Toyama	All cities/towns in Toyama	
Montedio Yamagata	All cities/towns in Yamagata	
Roasso Kumamoto	Kumamoto	
Kyoto Sanga	Southwestern cities/towns in Kyoto	
Thespakusatsu Gunma	All cities/towns in Gunma	
Tochigi SC	Utsunomiya, Tochigi	
Oita Trinita	Ōita	Relegated from J1 League in 2013
Tokyo Verdy	All cities/towns in Tokyo	
V-Varen Nagasaki	All cities/towns in Nagasaki	
Matsumoto Yamaga	Matsumoto, Nagano	
Yokohama FC	Yokohama, Kanagawa	

=== Foreign players ===
Club	Player 1	Player 2	Player 3	Asian player	Non-visa foreign	Type-C contract
Avispa Fukuoka	(South Korea) Lee Kwang-seon	(South Korea) Oh Chang-hyun		(South Korea) Park Kun		(Malaysia) Tam Sheang Tsung
Shonan Bellmare	(Brazil) Wellington					
Consadole Sapporo	(Brazil) Paulão	(Brazil) Renan	(South Korea) Jeong Shung-hoon	(South Korea) Lee Ho-seung	(Indonesia) Stefano Lilipaly	
Ehime FC	(Brazil) Ricardo Lobo	(South Korea) Kim Min-je	(South Korea) Moon Dong-ju	(South Korea) Han Hee-hoon		
Fagiano Okayama	(Brazil) Hugo					(United States) Piakai Henkel
FC Gifu	(Brazil) Henik	(Brazil) Kleiton Domingues	(Colombia) Cristian Nazarit		(Brazil) Tiago Pereira	
Giravanz Kitakyushu						
Mito HollyHock	(Brazil) Osmar			(South Korea) Yun Yeong-seung	(North Korea) Kim Song-gi	
JEF United Chiba	(Brazil) Jair	(Brazil) Kempes	(South Korea) Kim Hyun-hun	(South Korea) Nam Seung-woo		
Júbilo Iwata	(Brazil) Ferdinando	(Brazil) Popó	(Brazil) Tinga	(South Korea) Baek Sung-dong		
Kamatamare Sanuki	(Brazil) Allan	(Brazil) Evson	(France) Andrea Blede	(South Korea) Song Han-Ki		
Kataller Toyama	(South Korea) Park Tae-Hong			(South Korea) Kim Young-keun		(China) Gao Zhunyi
Montedio Yamagata	(Brazil) Diego Souza	(South Korea) Kim Byeom-yong		(South Korea) Lee Joo-young	(Peru) Romero Frank	
Roasso Kumamoto	(Brazil) Anderson	(Brazil) Fábio	(South Korea) Kim Byeong-yeon	(South Korea) Kim Jeong-seok	(Brazil) Pablo	
Kyoto Sanga	(Brazil) Douglas	(Brazil) Jairo	(Serbia) Miloš Bajalica	(South Korea) Oh Seung-hoon	(South Korea) Hwang Te-song	
Thespakusatsu Gunma	(Brazil) Daniel Lovinho	(Brazil) Eder	(South Korea) Kweon Han-jin	(North Korea) Hwang Song-su	(South Korea) Hwang Tae-jun	(Brazil) Kaique
Tochigi SC	(South Korea) Lee Min-soo			(South Korea) Cha Young-hwan		
Oita Trinita	(Brazil) Daniel	(Montenegro) Dzenan Radoncic	(South Korea) Gang Yoon-goo	(South Korea) Kim Jeong-hyun		(Colombia) Jonathan
Tokyo Verdy	(Brazil) Abuda	(Brazil) Nildo		(South Korea) Kim Jong-pil		
V-Varen Nagasaki	(Croatia) Stipe	(Serbia) Knez	(South Korea) Lee Yong-Jae	(South Korea) Lee Dae-heon		(South Korea) Jung Hoon-sung
Matsumoto Yamaga	(Brazil) Sabia	(South Korea) Lee Jun-Hyeob		(South Korea) Yoon Sung-yeul		
Yokohama FC	(Brazil) Douglas	(Brazil) Ronaldo	(South Korea) Park Sung-ho	(South Korea) Na Sung-soo	(North Korea) An Yong-hak	(Brazil) Felipe

== League table ==
Pos	Team	Pld	W	D	L	GF	GA	GD	Pts	Promotion or relegation
1	Shonan Bellmare (C, P)	42	31	8	3	86	25	+61	101	Qualification for 2015 J1 League
2	Matsumoto Yamaga (P)	42	24	11	7	65	35	+30	83	Qualification for 2015 J1 League
3	JEF United Chiba	42	18	14	10	55	44	+11	68	Qualification for Promotion Playoffs (Note: Only teams that meet J1 license criteria can participate in promotion playoffs. If one or more teams fail to meet the criteria, only eligible teams that finished 3rd to 6th will participate and no replacement teams will be added.)
4	Júbilo Iwata	42	18	13	11	67	55	+12	67	Qualification for Promotion Playoffs
5	Giravanz Kitakyushu	42	18	11	13	50	50	0	65	Ineligible for promotion
6	Montedio Yamagata (P)	42	18	10	14	57	44	+13	64	Qualification for Promotion Playoffs
7	Oita Trinita	42	17	12	13	52	55	−3	63	
8	Fagiano Okayama	42	15	16	11	52	48	+4	61	
9	Kyoto Sanga	42	14	18	10	57	52	+5	60	
10	Consadole Sapporo	42	15	14	13	48	44	+4	59	
11	Yokohama FC	42	14	13	15	49	47	+2	55	
12	Tochigi SC	42	15	10	17	52	58	−6	55	
13	Roasso Kumamoto	42	13	15	14	45	53	−8	54	
14	V-Varen Nagasaki	42	12	16	14	45	42	+3	52	
15	Mito HollyHock	42	12	14	16	46	46	0	50	Ineligible for promotion
16	Avispa Fukuoka	42	13	11	18	52	60	−8	50	
17	FC Gifu	42	13	10	19	54	61	−7	49	Ineligible for promotion
18	Thespakusatsu Gunma	42	14	7	21	45	54	−9	49	
19	Ehime FC	42	12	12	18	54	58	−4	48	
20	Tokyo Verdy	42	9	15	18	31	48	−17	42	
21	Kamatamare Sanuki	42	7	12	23	34	71	−37	33	Qualification for Relegation Playoffs (Note: The playoffs and direct exchange between J2 and J3 are subject to eligibility of J2-licensed teams in top 2 of 2014 J3 League)
22	Kataller Toyama (R)	42	5	8	29	28	74	−46	23	Relegation to 2015 J3 League

Updated to match(es) played on 23 November 2014. Source: J.League data
Rules for classification: 1) points; 2) goal difference; 3) number of goals scored.
(C) Champions; (P) Promoted; (R) Relegated

== Results ==
Home \ Away	AVI	BEL	CON	EHI	FAG	GIF	GIR	HOL	JEF	JÚB	KAM	KAT	MON	ROS	SAN	SPA	TOC	TRI	VVN	VER	YAM	YFC
Avispa Fukuoka		0–0	2–2	1–1	2–3	1–0	0–1	0–1	1–0	3–1	1–2	2–1	0–1	1–3	1–0	1–1	2–0	1–2	2–5	0–1	1–2	1–0
Shonan Bellmare	2–0		2–0	3–0	2–0	0–0	2–0	4–2	1–1	1–1	3–1	2–0	1–0	2–1	3–0	1–0	2–1	4–0	1–2	1–0	1–1	4–1
Consadole Sapporo	1–1	2–0		0–1	3–1	3–2	3–0	4–0	0–2	1–1	1–1	2–1	1–1	2–2	0–1	1–0	1–1	1–1	2–1	0–0	1–0	0–1
Ehime FC	0–0	1–0	2–3		2–3	0–0	2–1	0–2	2–2	0–1	2–0	4–0	4–0	4–0	0–0	0–2	0–1	1–2	0–3	2–1	1–4	2–1
Fagiano Okayama	1–1	0–0	2–0	1–1		2–1	0–3	1–1	1–0	1–1	2–2	0–0	1–4	1–1	2–3	1–2	3–1	1–1	2–1	2–1	0–0	0–0
FC Gifu	1–2	2–3	1–1	4–3	2–2		1–1	0–2	2–2	0–4	3–1	3–0	1–0	2–3	2–1	1–0	1–3	2–3	1–1	3–0	3–1	1–2
Giravanz Kitakyushu	3–5	0–4	2–0	0–3	2–1	2–0		1–0	1–0	3–2	2–1	2–2	0–1	1–1	1–3	2–1	0–1	1–1	2–1	2–1	0–0	2–1
Mito HollyHock	1–2	0–1	0–0	0–0	0–1	3–2	1–1		1–2	4–1	0–0	2–3	0–1	0–0	5–1	2–0	1–2	2–1	0–0	1–1	1–2	2–2
JEF United Chiba	3–0	0–6	2–0	1–0	1–0	1–0	1–3	1–0		2–2	1–1	2–1	2–0	3–0	3–0	3–2	0–2	2–1	1–1	0–0	0–1	0–0
Júbilo Iwata	3–3	1–2	0–1	2–0	1–1	3–1	3–1	1–0	2–0		4–2	3–2	0–2	3–1	2–2	2–0	2–3	1–1	1–0	1–2	1–1	2–2
Kamatamare Sanuki	1–1	0–2	1–0	1–2	2–1	1–2	1–1	0–0	0–1	1–4		2–1	0–3	1–1	2–2	1–0	0–1	0–1	0–1	0–1	0–5	0–1
Kataller Toyama	1–2	0–1	0–2	1–3	0–3	0–0	0–2	0–3	1–1	0–1	1–1		1–1	0–2	1–2	0–1	1–0	1–1	1–0	0–3	3–2	1–2
Montedio Yamagata	2–1	1–3	2–1	2–0	0–2	3–1	1–2	0–0	1–1	0–1	4–0	1–0		1–2	1–0	1–2	6–1	2–0	2–1	1–2	0–0	2–4
Roasso Kumamoto	2–1	1–3	0–2	3–1	0–0	0–3	0–1	2–1	0–0	0–0	4–1	2–0	1–3		1–4	0–1	2–1	1–1	1–1	0–0	0–1	2–2
Kyoto Sanga	3–1	2–2	1–1	0–0	1–1	0–0	1–1	1–1	3–3	2–3	4–1	1–1	2–2	0–0		0–3	0–0	2–2	2–0	1–0	0–0	2–1
Thespakusatsu Gunma	1–2	0–1	3–0	3–2	3–2	2–2	0–0	0–1	1–2	1–1	1–0	2–0	1–1	1–1	0–1		2–0	2–1	2–4	1–0	1–3	0–2
Tochigi SC	1–1	0–3	2–1	3–3	0–1	3–0	1–1	0–1	0–2	0–2	1–2	2–1	1–1	1–1	2–1	3–0		4–0	1–0	3–2	1–2	1–1
Oita Trinita	3–0	2–3	1–0	2–2	1–0	1–0	1–0	2–3	2–4	2–0	1–0	3–0	1–0	0–1	0–3	2–1	2–1		1–1	3–2	0–2	1–0
V-Varen Nagasaki	0–0	0–3	0–1	2–1	1–1	0–2	1–1	1–1	2–1	1–1	1–1	2–0	0–0	0–1	0–1	2–0	1–1	0–0		0–0	0–2	1–0
Tokyo Verdy	0–5	0–0	0–0	1–1	0–1	0–1	1–0	1–0	1–1	0–1	0–1	0–1	1–2	1–0	1–0	1–1	1–1	1–1	1–5		1–3	1–1
Matsumoto Yamaga	2–1	1–4	1–2	2–1	1–2	1–0	0–1	3–0	2–1	2–1	0–0	2–1	0–0	2–1	2–2	3–1	2–1	2–0	0–0	1–1		2–0
Yokohama FC	2–0	1–3	2–2	0–0	0–2	0–1	1–0	1–1	0–0	4–0	4–2	2–0	2–1	0–1	0–2	1–0	3–0	1–1	1–2	0–0	0–2	

Updated to match(es) played on 23 November 2014. Source: J. League data
Legend: Blue = home team win; Yellow = draw; Red = away team win.

== Play-offs ==
=== Promotion Playoffs to Division 1 ===
2014 J.League Road To J1 Play-Offs (2014 J1昇格プレーオフ)
Because Giravanz Kitakyushu did not obtain J1 license for 2015 season, they were ineligible to participate in the playoffs. Thus, JEF United Chiba who finished third in the season received a bye into the final.

Semifinal			Final
			3	JEF United Chiba	0
4	Júbilo Iwata	1	6	Montedio Yamagata	1
6	Montedio Yamagata	2

==== Semifinal ====
30 November 2014
13:00

Júbilo Iwata	1–2	Montedio Yamagata
Yamazaki 45+3'	Report	Diego 26'; Yamagishi 90+2'

Yamaha Stadium, Iwata, Shizuoka
Attendance: 11,239
Referee: Jumpei Iida

==== Final ====
7 December 2014
15:30

JEF United Chiba	0–1	Montedio Yamagata
		Yamazaki 37'

Ajinomoto Stadium, Chōfu, Tokyo
Attendance: 35,504
Referee: Hajime Matsuo

Montedio Yamagata were promoted to J1 League.

=== J3 Relegation Playoffs ===
2014 J2/J3 Play-Offs (2014 J2・J3入れ替え戦)

Team 1	Agg.	Team 2	1st leg	2nd leg
Kamatamare Sanuki	1–0	Nagano Parceiro	0–0	1-0

30 November 2014
12:30

Nagano Parceiro	0–0	Kamatamare Sanuki
	Report

Nagano Athletic Stadium, Nagano
Attendance: 8,944
Referee: Itaru Hirose

7 December 2014
12:30

Kamatamare Sanuki	1–0	Nagano Parceiro
Kijima 71'

Kagawa Marugame Stadium, Marugame, Kagawa
Attendance: 6,170

Kamatamare Sanuki remains in J2 League.
Nagano Parceiro remains in J3 League.

== Top scorers ==
Rank	Scorer	Club	Goals
1	(Japan) Masashi Oguro	Kyoto Sanga	26
2	(Brazil) Wellington	Shonan Bellmare	20
3	(Japan) Takayuki Funayama	Matsumoto Yamaga	19
4	(Japan) Ryoichi Maeda	Júbilo Iwata	17
4	(Colombia) Cristian Nazarit	FC Gifu	17
6	(Japan) Tomoki Ikemoto	Giravanz Kitakyushu	15
7	(Brazil) Diego	Montedio Yamagata	14
7	(Brazil) Daniel Lovinho	Thespakusatsu Gunma	14
7	(Japan) Shohei Okada	Shonan Bellmare	14
7	(Japan) Ken Tokura	Consadole Sapporo	14

Updated to games played on 23 November 2014
Source: J. League data

== Attendances ==
Pos	Team	Total	High	Low	Average	Change
1	Matsumoto Yamaga	267,402	18,496	8,608	12,733	+15.3%
2	Consadole Sapporo	232,255	20,633	6,646	11,060	+9.8%
3	JEF United Chiba	195,999	14,575	5,957	9,333	−6.7%
4	Júbilo Iwata	184,261	13,177	6,108	8,774	−19.5%^{†}
5	Shonan Bellmare	178,041	14,155	5,963	8,478	−14.5%^{†}
6	Oita Trinita	176,859	20,636	5,028	8,422	−29.3%^{†}
7	Fagiano Okayama	176,477	12,359	6,117	8,404	−2.0%
8	FC Gifu	159,259	15,138	3,162	7,584	+67.6%
9	Kyoto Sanga	157,911	12,452	3,680	7,520	−4.7%
10	Roasso Kumamoto	147,046	12,661	3,580	7,002	+12.4%
11	Montedio Yamagata	133,316	13,344	4,270	6,348	−9.6%
12	Tokyo Verdy	114,023	12,658	2,434	5,430	−14.4%
13	Tochigi SC	111,178	9,131	3,155	5,294	+7.6%
14	Yokohama FC	108,064	8,702	2,577	5,146	−15.1%
15	Avispa Fukuoka	106,303	7,875	3,444	5,062	−11.6%
16	V-Varen Nagasaki	101,611	12,638	3,017	4,839	−21.5%
17	Mito HollyHock	99,422	7,033	3,359	4,734	+2.2%
18	Kataller Toyama	89,596	8,018	2,622	4,266	−4.6%
19	Ehime FC	80,228	8,295	2,057	3,820	−3.3%
20	Thespakusatsu Gunma	78,961	6,407	1,509	3,760	+5.3%
21	Giravanz Kitakyushu	76,072	6,516	1,462	3,622	+14.1%
22	Kamatamare Sanuki	69,664	10,421	1,450	3,317	+6.1%^{‡}
	League total	3,043,948	20,636	1,450	6,589	−1.1%

Updated to games played on 23 November 2014
Source: J. League data
Notes:
^{†} Team played previous season in J1.
^{‡} Team played previous season in JFL.
