= List of Japanese football transfers winter 2012–13 =

This is a list of Japanese football transfers in the winter transfer window 2012–2013 by club.

== J.League Division 1 ==
=== Albirex Niigata ===
In: Note: Flags indicate national team as defined under FIFA eligibility rules; some limited exceptions apply. Players may hold more than one non-FIFA nationality.

No.	Pos.	Nation	Player
4	DF	KOR	Kim Kun-Hoan (Transferred from Yokohama F. Marinos)
5	DF	JPN	Mizuki Hamada (loan from Urawa Red Diamonds)
8	MF	BRA	Léo Silva (Transferred from (Brazil) Portuguesa)
9	FW	JPN	Tatsuya Tanaka (Transferred from Urawa Red Diamonds)
14	MF	JPN	Kazuki Kozuka (Drafted from Teikyo Nagaoka High School)
16	FW	JPN	Hideya Okamoto (Transferred from Kashima Antlers)
18	MF	JPN	Sho Naruoka (Transferred from Avispa Fukuoka)
20	FW	JPN	Kengo Kawamata (loan return from Fagiano Okayama)
24	DF	JPN	Naoki Kawaguchi (Promoted from youth team)
27	FW	JPN	Musashi Okuyama (loan return from Albirex Niigata Singapore FC)
31	GK	JPN	Akihiko Takeshige (loan from Júbilo Iwata)

Out: Note: Flags indicate national team as defined under FIFA eligibility rules; some limited exceptions apply. Players may hold more than one non-FIFA nationality.

No.	Pos.	Nation	Player
4	DF	JPN	Daisuke Suzuki (Transferred to Kashiwa Reysol)
5	DF	JPN	Naoki Ishikawa (Transferred to Vegalta Sendai)
8	MF	JPN	Fumiya Kogure (loan to Mito HollyHock)
9	FW	JPN	Kisho Yano (Transferred to Nagoya Grampus)
10	MF	BRA	Michael (Released)
13	MF	JPN	Taisuke Nakamura (loan return to Kyoto Sanga FC)
14	FW	JPN	Shoki Hirai (loan return to Gamba Osaka)
16	MF	KOR	Kim Young-Keun (loan to Kataller Toyama)
18	MF	BRA	Alan Mineiro (loan return to (Brazil) Paulista)
20	DF	JPN	Shigeto Masuda (loan to Thespa Kusatsu)
27	FW	JPN	Bruno Castanheira (Transferred to Albirex Niigata Singapore FC)
30	GK	JPN	Hideaki Ozawa (Released)
32	MF	JPN	Yoshiyuki Kobayashi (Retired)
—	DF	JPN	Ryoma Nishimura (loan to Japan Soccer College)
—	FW	BRA	Anderson (loan to Machida Zelvia, previously on loan at Fagiano Okayama)

=== Kashima Antlers ===
In: Note: Flags indicate national team as defined under FIFA eligibility rules; some limited exceptions apply. Players may hold more than one non-FIFA nationality.

No.	Pos.	Nation	Player
11	FW	BRA	Davi (Transferred from (Qatar) Umm Salal SC)
13	MF	JPN	Atsutaka Nakamura (Transferred from Kyoto Sanga FC)
17	DF	JPN	Takanori Maeno (Transferred from Ehime FC)
19	MF	JPN	Yuta Toyokawa (Drafted from Ohzu High School)
23	DF	JPN	Naomichi Ueda (Drafted from Ohzu High School)
33	MF	JPN	Daichi Kawashima (loan return from Montedio Yamagata)
35	MF	JPN	Takuya Nozawa (Transferred from Vissel Kobe)

Out: Note: Flags indicate national team as defined under FIFA eligibility rules; some limited exceptions apply. Players may hold more than one non-FIFA nationality.

No.	Pos.	Nation	Player
7	DF	JPN	Toru Araiba (Transferred to Cerezo Osaka)
11	MF	BRA	Dutra (Transferred to (Belgium) KSC Lokeren)
13	FW	JPN	Shinzo Koroki (Transferred to Urawa Red Diamonds)
14	MF	JPN	Chikashi Masuda (Transferred to (South Korea) Ulsan Hyundai)
19	FW	JPN	Hideya Okamoto (Transferred to Albirex Niigata)
33	MF	BRA	Renato Cajá (loan return to (China) Guangzhou Evergrande)
—	FW	JPN	Ryuta Sasaki (Released, previously on loan at Tochigi SC)

=== Omiya Ardija ===
In: Note: Flags indicate national team as defined under FIFA eligibility rules; some limited exceptions apply. Players may hold more than one non-FIFA nationality.

No.	Pos.	Nation	Player
3	DF	JPN	Shunsuke Fukuda (loan return from Kataller Toyama)
17	DF	JPN	Shohei Takahashi (Transferred from Tokyo Verdy)
25	MF	JPN	Taisuke Miyazaki (loan return from Shonan Bellmare)
27	DF	JPN	Tomoki Imai (Drafted from Chuo University)
28	FW	JPN	Takamitsu Tomiyama (Drafted from Waseda University)
35	GK	JPN	Shuhei Kawata (Promoted from youth team)

Out: Note: Flags indicate national team as defined under FIFA eligibility rules; some limited exceptions apply. Players may hold more than one non-FIFA nationality.

No.	Pos.	Nation	Player
3	DF	JPN	Hiroyuki Komoto (loan return to Vissel Kobe)
4	DF	JPN	Yuki Fukaya (Transferred to Oita Trinita)
8	MF	JPN	Keigo Higashi (Transferred to FC Tokyo)
16	MF	JPN	Jun Kanakubo (loan to Avispa Fukuoka)
27	FW	JPN	Masahiko Ichikawa (Released)
33	MF	KOR	Lee Keun-Ho (loan to Giravanz Kitakyushu)

=== Shonan Bellmare ===
In Note: Flags indicate national team as defined under FIFA eligibility rules; some limited exceptions apply. Players may hold more than one non-FIFA nationality.

No.	Pos.	Nation	Player
4	DF	JPN	Hirokazu Usami (Transferred from Tochigi SC)
16	FW	BOL	Edivaldo (Transferred from (Thailand) Muangthong United F.C.)
21	GK	JPN	Shunsuke Ando (loan from Kawasaki Frontale)
23	MF	JPN	Ryota Kajikawa (Transferred from Tokyo Verdy)
25	MF	JPN	Kenji Arabori (Transferred from Tochigi SC)
27	GK	JPN	Yuta Suzuki (Transferred from Montedio Yamagata)
28	FW	JPN	Kosuke Taketomi (loan from Kashiwa Reysol)
29	FW	JPN	Ryohei Yoshihama (Drafted from Shoin University)
31	DF	JPN	Takuya Muraoka (Drafted from Kanagawa University)
32	DF	KOR	Kweon Han-Jin (loan from Kashiwa Reysol)
33	FW	JPN	Shota Tamura (Drafted from Yokkaichi Chuo Kogyo High School)
34	MF	JPN	Hiroto Nakagawa (loan from Kashiwa Reysol)
35	FW	JPN	Ryosuke Kawano (Promoted from youth team)
—	MF	JPN	Kosuke Shirai (Drafted from Osaka Toin High School)

Out Note: Flags indicate national team as defined under FIFA eligibility rules; some limited exceptions apply. Players may hold more than one non-FIFA nationality.

No.	Pos.	Nation	Player
1	GK	KOR	Kim Yeong-Gi (Transferred to Oita Trinita)
4	DF	JPN	Takahiro Yamaguchi (loan to V-Varen Nagasaki)
8	MF	JPN	Koji Sakamoto (Retired)
20	DF	JPN	Kohei Mihara (loan to Ehime FC)
21	GK	JPN	Takuya Matsumoto (loan to Giravanz Kitakyushu)
24	DF	JPN	Kento Fukuda (Transferred to Albirex Niigata Singapore FC)
25	MF	JPN	Taisuke Miyazaki (loan return to Omiya Ardija)
28	MF	KOR	Lee Min-Soo (loan return to Shimizu S-Pulse)
—	DF	JPN	Naoya Ishigami (loan to Tokyo Verdy, previously on loan at Oita Trinita)
—	MF	JPN	Kosuke Shirai (loan to Fukushima United F.C.)
—	FW	JPN	Kazushi Mitsuhira (Transferred to Kyoto Sanga FC, previously on loan at Oita Trinita)

=== Cerezo Osaka ===
In: Note: Flags indicate national team as defined under FIFA eligibility rules; some limited exceptions apply. Players may hold more than one non-FIFA nationality.

No.	Pos.	Nation	Player
1	GK	JPN	Yohei Takeda (Transferred from Shimizu S-Pulse)
7	DF	JPN	Toru Araiba (Transferred from Kashima Antlers)
9	FW	BRA	Edno (loan from (Mexico) Tigres de la UANL)
10	MF	JPN	Jumpei Kusukami (Transferred from Kawasaki Frontale)
13	FW	JPN	Takumi Minamino (Promoted from youth team)
26	MF	JPN	Daichi Akiyama (Promoted from youth team)
27	GK	KOR	Gu Sung-Yun (Drafted from (South Korea) Jaehyun High School)
29	MF	JPN	Daiki Kogure (Promoted from youth team)
31	MF	BRA	Branquinho (loan return from Montedio Yamagata)
32	MF	JPN	Takeru Okada (Promoted from youth team)
33	DF	JPN	Kenta Mukuhara (loan from FC Tokyo)

Out: Note: Flags indicate national team as defined under FIFA eligibility rules; some limited exceptions apply. Players may hold more than one non-FIFA nationality.

No.	Pos.	Nation	Player
1	GK	JPN	Kenya Matsui (loan to Tokushima Vortis)
5	DF	JPN	Tetsuya Funatsu (loan return to Kataller Toyama)
20	MF	JPN	Daisuke Takahashi (Released)
22	DF	JPN	Arata Kodama (Transferred to Oita Trinita)
24	DF	PRK	Kim Song-Gi (loan to Vissel Kobe)
26	MF	JPN	Kazuya Murata (Released)
29	MF	JPN	Kanta Goto (Released)
30	GK	JPN	Kenjiro Ogino (Transferred to Albirex Niigata Singapore FC)
37	MF	BRA	Heberty (loan return to Thespa Kusatsu)
—	DF	JPN	Ryosuke Tada (loan to Thespa Kusatsu, previously on loan at Oita Trinita)
—	DF	KOR	Kim Chang-Hun (loan to (South Korea) Mipo Dolphin, previously on loan at Oita Trinita)
—	MF	JPN	Naoto Noguchi (loan to MIO Biwako Shiga, previously on loan at Oita Trinita)

=== Yokohama F. Marinos ===
In: Note: Flags indicate national team as defined under FIFA eligibility rules; some limited exceptions apply. Players may hold more than one non-FIFA nationality.

No.	Pos.	Nation	Player
15	DF	BRA	Fabio (Transferred from S.C. Sagamihara)
17	FW	JPN	Jin Hanato (loan return from Giravanz Kitakyushu)
19	FW	JPN	Yoshihito Fujita (Transferred from JEF United Chiba)
20	MF	JPN	Yuhei Sato (Drafted from Kokushikan University)
23	DF	JPN	Masakazu Tashiro (loan return from F.C. Machida Zelvia)
24	DF	JPN	Yuuta Narawa (Transferred from Sagawa Shiga FC)
26	DF	KOR	Jeong Dong-Ho (loan return from (China) Hangzhou Greentown)
28	MF	JPN	Takuya Kida (Promoted from youth team)

Out: Note: Flags indicate national team as defined under FIFA eligibility rules; some limited exceptions apply. Players may hold more than one non-FIFA nationality.

No.	Pos.	Nation	Player
9	FW	JPN	Masashi Oguro (loan to (China) Hangzhou Greentown)
10	FW	JPN	Yuji Ono (Transferred to (Belgium) Standard Liège)
14	MF	JPN	Kenta Kano (Transferred to Kashiwa Reysol)
17	MF	JPN	Rei Matsumoto (loan to Oita Trinita)
19	MF	JPN	Kentaro Moriya (Transferred to Kawasaki Frontale)
23	MF	JPN	Sho Matsumoto (loan to Ehime FC)
24	DF	JPN	Takashi Kanai (loan to Sagan Tosu)
26	DF	JPN	Naoaki Aoyama (Transferred to Ventforet Kofu)
29	MF	JPN	Hiroyuki Taniguchi (Transferred to Kashiwa Reysol)
—	MF	JPN	Kota Mizunuma (Transferred to Sagan Tosu, previously on loan at Sagan Tosu)
—	DF	JPN	Eijiro Takeda (loan to Gainare Tottori, previously on loan at JEF United Chiba)
—	DF	KOR	Kim Kun-Hoan (Transferred to Albirex Niigata, previously on loan at Sagan Tosu)

=== Kawasaki Frontale ===
In Note: Flags indicate national team as defined under FIFA eligibility rules; some limited exceptions apply. Players may hold more than one non-FIFA nationality.

No.	Pos.	Nation	Player
6	MF	JPN	Masaki Yamamoto (Transferred from Consadole Sapporo)
7	DF	JPN	Sota Nakazawa (Transferred from Gamba Osaka)
13	FW	JPN	Yoshito Ōkubo (Transferred from Vissel Kobe)
17	FW	JPN	Yuki Natsume (loan return from Tochigi SC)
18	FW	BRA	Patric (loan from (Brazil) Atlético Goianiense)
19	MF	JPN	Kentaro Moriya (Transferred from Yokohama F. Marinos)
27	FW	PRK	Ahn Byung-Jun (Drafted from Chuo University)
30	GK	JPN	Shota Arai (Transferred from Tokyo Verdy)
32	DF	JPN	Jun Sonoda (loan return from F.C. Machida Zelvia)

Out Note: Flags indicate national team as defined under FIFA eligibility rules; some limited exceptions apply. Players may hold more than one non-FIFA nationality.

No.	Pos.	Nation	Player
7	FW	JPN	Masaru Kurotsu (Transferred to Yokohama FC)
13	MF	JPN	Koji Yamase (Transferred to Kyoto Sanga FC)
16	MF	JPN	Jumpei Kusukami (Transferred to Cerezo Osaka)
17	FW	JPN	Rui Komatsu (Transferred to Oita Trinita)
18	MF	JPN	Kyohei Sugiura (loan to Vissel Kobe)
25	MF	BRA	Rene Santos (loan return to (Brazil) Grêmio)
27	GK	JPN	Shunsuke Ando (loan to Shonan Bellmare)
33	DF	JPN	Shun Morishita (loan to Yokohama FC)
—	DF	JPN	Yudai Tanaka (loan to Gainare Tottori, previously on loan at Tochigi SC)
—	MF	JPN	Kosei Shibasaki (Transferred to Tokushima Vortis, previously on loan at Tokyo Verdy)

=== Nagoya Grampus ===
In: Note: Flags indicate national team as defined under FIFA eligibility rules; some limited exceptions apply. Players may hold more than one non-FIFA nationality.

No.	Pos.	Nation	Player
3	DF	JPN	Yusuke Muta (Drafted from Fukuoka University)
9	MF	MKD	Nikola Jakimovski (Transferred from (Serbia) FK Javor Ivanjica)
15	DF	JPN	Yuki Honda (Drafted from Hannan University)
19	FW	JPN	Kisho Yano (Transferred from Albirex Niigata)
24	DF	JPN	Nikki Havenaar (Promoted from youth team)
25	MF	JPN	Reo Mochizuki (Drafted from Yasu High School)
26	FW	BRA	Thiago Pereira (Drafted from Shibuya Makuhari High School)

Out: Note: Flags indicate national team as defined under FIFA eligibility rules; some limited exceptions apply. Players may hold more than one non-FIFA nationality.

No.	Pos.	Nation	Player
14	MF	JPN	Keiji Yoshimura (Transferred to Ehime FC)
17	FW	JPN	Yuki Maki (Retired)
18	FW	JPN	Kensuke Nagai (Transferred to (Belgium) Standard Liège)
25	MF	JPN	Mu Kanazaki (Transferred to (Germany) 1. FC Nürnberg)
34	MF	JPN	Makito Yoshida (loan to Matsumoto Yamaga)
38	MF	JPN	Alessandro Santos (Transferred to Tochigi SC)

=== Júbilo Iwata ===
In: Note: Flags indicate national team as defined under FIFA eligibility rules; some limited exceptions apply. Players may hold more than one non-FIFA nationality.

No.	Pos.	Nation	Player
6	MF	JPN	Hiroto Tanaka (Drafted from Kansai University)
19	DF	JPN	Masahiko Inoha (Transferred from Vissel Kobe)
22	MF	KOR	Jung Woo-Young (loan from Kyoto Sanga FC)
29	GK	JPN	Ayumi Niekawa (Promoted from youth team)

Out: Note: Flags indicate national team as defined under FIFA eligibility rules; some limited exceptions apply. Players may hold more than one non-FIFA nationality.

No.	Pos.	Nation	Player
4	DF	JPN	Mitsuru Chiyotanda (Transferred to Tokushima Vortis)
6	MF	BRA	Rodrigo Souto (Transferred to (Brazil) Náutico)
14	FW	JPN	Yuki Oshitani (loan to Fagiano Okayama)
31	GK	JPN	Akihiko Takeshige (loan to Albirex Niigata)
34	FW	PRK	Hwang Song-Su (Transferred to Thespa Kusatsu)
44	FW	KOR	Han Sang-Woon (Transferred to (South Korea) Ulsan Hyundai)
—	FW	JPN	Tomoyuki Arata (loan to Fagiano Okayama, previously on loan at JEF United Chiba)

=== Urawa Red Diamonds ===
In Note: Flags indicate national team as defined under FIFA eligibility rules; some limited exceptions apply. Players may hold more than one non-FIFA nationality.

No.	Pos.	Nation	Player
4	DF	JPN	Daisuke Nasu (Transferred from Kashiwa Reysol)
11	MF	JPN	Kunimitsu Sekiguchi (Transferred from Vegalta Sendai)
19	FW	JPN	Toyofumi Sakano (Drafted from Meiji University)
26	MF	JPN	Takuya Nagata (loan return from Thespa Kusatsu)
30	FW	JPN	Shinzo Koroki (Transferred from Kashima Antlers)
46	DF	JPN	Ryota Moriwaki (Transferred from Sanfrecce Hiroshima)

Out Note: Flags indicate national team as defined under FIFA eligibility rules; some limited exceptions apply. Players may hold more than one non-FIFA nationality.

No.	Pos.	Nation	Player
11	FW	JPN	Tatsuya Tanaka (Transferred to Albirex Niigata)
16	FW	BRA	Popó (Transferred to Vissel Kobe)
26	DF	JPN	Mizuki Hamada (loan to Albirex Niigata)

=== Kashiwa Reysol ===
In Note: Flags indicate national team as defined under FIFA eligibility rules; some limited exceptions apply. Players may hold more than one non-FIFA nationality.

No.	Pos.	Nation	Player
4	DF	JPN	Daisuke Suzuki (Transferred from Albirex Niigata)
11	FW	BRA	Cléo (loan from (China) Guangzhou Evergrande)
14	MF	JPN	Kenta Kano (Transferred from Yokohama F. Marinos)
17	MF	JPN	Hiroki Akino (Promoted from youth team)
19	FW	JPN	Yu Kimura (Promoted from youth team)
25	MF	JPN	Yusuke Kobayashi (Promoted from youth team)
26	MF	JPN	Tetsuro Ota (Transferred from Montedio Yamagata)
27	DF	KOR	Kim Chang-Soo (Transferred from (South Korea) Busan IPark)
29	MF	JPN	Hiroyuki Taniguchi (Transferred from Yokohama F. Marinos)
31	GK	JPN	Kosuke Nakamura (Promoted from youth team)
—	MF	JPN	Hiroto Nakagawa (Promoted from youth team)

Out Note: Flags indicate national team as defined under FIFA eligibility rules; some limited exceptions apply. Players may hold more than one non-FIFA nationality.

No.	Pos.	Nation	Player
6	DF	JPN	Daisuke Nasu (Transferred to Urawa Red Diamonds)
11	FW	BRA	Neto Baiano (Transferred to (Brazil) Goiás)
14	DF	KOR	Kweon Han-Jin (loan to Shonan Bellmare)
17	MF	PRK	Ahn Young-Hak (Released)
26	DF	JPN	Ryoji Fukui (Transferred to Tokyo Verdy)
29	MF	JPN	Koki Mizuno (Transferred to Ventforet Kofu)
31	GK	JPN	Goro Kawanami (loan to Tokushima Vortis)
—	GK	JPN	Yuya Miura (Transferred to Shimizu S-Pulse, previously on loan at Matsumoto Yamaga)
—	MF	JPN	Hiroto Nakagawa (loan to Shonan Bellmare)
—	MF	JPN	Taishi Soma (loan to F.C. Machida Zelvia, previously on loan at F.C. Ryukyu)
—	MF	JPN	Kosuke Taketomi (loan to Shonan Bellmare, previously on loan at Roasso Kumamoto)
—	FW	BRA	Efrain Rintaro (Transferred to FC Ryukyu, previously on loan at Blaublitz Akita)

=== Shimizu S-Pulse ===
In: Note: Flags indicate national team as defined under FIFA eligibility rules; some limited exceptions apply. Players may hold more than one non-FIFA nationality.

No.	Pos.	Nation	Player
9	FW	BRA	Baré (Transferred from (United Arab Emirates) Al Jazira Club)
11	FW	JPN	Yuji Senuma (Drafted from University of Tsukuba)
15	FW	JPN	Hiroki Higuchi (loan return from FC Gifu)
16	MF	JPN	Mitsunari Musaka (Drafted from Chuo University)
17	MF	JPN	Ibuki Fujita (Drafted from Keio University)
18	MF	KOR	Lee Min-Soo (loan return from Shonan Bellmare)
19	MF	JPN	Akito Tachibana (loan return from Matsumoto Yamaga)
20	MF	JPN	Ryo Takeuchi (loan return from Giravanz Kitakyushu)
22	MF	JPN	Kenta Uchida (Transferred from Ehime FC)
27	DF	JPN	Tomonobu Hiroi (loan return from Roasso Kumamoto)
29	DF	JPN	Genta Miura (Drafted from Osaka Toin High School)
30	DF	JPN	Naoya Okane (loan return from Montedio Yamagata)
31	GK	JPN	Toshiyasu Takahara (Transferred from Consadole Sapporo)
33	FW	JPN	Sho Kagami (Promoted from youth team)
36	GK	JPN	Yuya Miura (Transferred from Kashiwa Reysol)

Out: Note: Flags indicate national team as defined under FIFA eligibility rules; some limited exceptions apply. Players may hold more than one non-FIFA nationality.

No.	Pos.	Nation	Player
1	GK	JPN	Kaito Yamamoto (Transferred to Vissel Kobe)
10	MF	JPN	Daigo Kobayashi (Transferred to (Canada) Vancouver Whitecaps FC)
11	FW	JPN	Genki Omae (Transferred to (Germany) Fortuna Düsseldorf)
19	FW	JPN	Naohiro Takahara (Transferred to Tokyo Verdy)
21	GK	JPN	Kenpei Usui (Transferred to JEF United Chiba)
30	DF	PRK	Kang Song-Ho (loan to Kyoto Sanga FC)
35	FW	KOR	Kim Hyun-Sung (loan return to (South Korea) FC Seoul)
36	DF	JPN	Kiyotaka Miyoshi (Released)
—	GK	JPN	Yohei Takeda (Transferred to Cerezo Osaka, previously on loan at Gamba Osaka)
—	DF	JPN	Shinji Tsujio (Transferred to Oita Trinita, previously on loan at Sanfrecce Hiroshima)
—	FW	JPN	Shun Nagasawa (loan to Matsumoto Yamaga, previously on loan at Kyoto Sanga FC)
—	FW	BRA	Jymmy França (Released, previously on loan at Tokyo Verdy)

=== Sagan Tosu ===
In Note: Flags indicate national team as defined under FIFA eligibility rules; some limited exceptions apply. Players may hold more than one non-FIFA nationality.

No.	Pos.	Nation	Player
5	DF	JPN	Tatsuya Sakai (Drafted from National Institute of Fitness and Sports in Kanoya)
6	MF	COL	Jonathan (Transferred from (Colombia) Millonarios)
9	FW	BRA	Roni (loan from (Brazil) São Paulo FC)
13	DF	KOR	Kim Jung-Ya (loan from Gamba Osaka)
16	FW	COL	Diego (Transferred from (Colombia) Once Caldas)
23	MF	JPN	Toshiya Sueyoshi (Transferred from Avispa Fukuoka)
24	DF	JPN	Takashi Kanai (loan from Yokohama F. Marinos)
26	FW	JPN	Shuto Hira (Drafted from Saga Higashi High School)
27	MF	JPN	Koki Kiyotake (Drafted from Fukuoka University)
29	DF	JPN	Shohei Kishida (Drafted from Fukuoka University)

Out Note: Flags indicate national team as defined under FIFA eligibility rules; some limited exceptions apply. Players may hold more than one non-FIFA nationality.

No.	Pos.	Nation	Player
5	DF	KOR	Kim Kun-Hoan (loan return to Yokohama F. Marinos)
6	MF	JPN	Tomotaka Okamoto (loan return to Sanfrecce Hiroshima)
9	FW	BRA	Tozin (loan return to (Brazil) Corinthians Alagoano)
13	DF	JPN	Yusuke Inuzuka (Released)
16	FW	COL	Diego (Released)
23	DF	JPN	So Morita (Released)
24	DF	JPN	Kyohei Kuroki (loan to Ehime FC)
30	MF	JPN	Kohei Kuroki (loan to Roasso Kumamoto)

=== Sanfrecce Hiroshima ===
In Note: Flags indicate national team as defined under FIFA eligibility rules; some limited exceptions apply. Players may hold more than one non-FIFA nationality.

No.	Pos.	Nation	Player
15	MF	JPN	Tomotaka Okamoto (loan return from Sagan Tosu)
17	DF	KOR	Park Hyung-Jin (Drafted from (South Korea) Korea University)
24	MF	JPN	Gakuto Notsuda (Promoted from youth team)
29	FW	JPN	Takuma Asano (Drafted from Yokkaichi Chuo Kogyo High School)
32	MF	KOR	Kim Jeong-Seok (Drafted from (South Korea) Chuncheon Tech. Mech. High School)

Out Note: Flags indicate national team as defined under FIFA eligibility rules; some limited exceptions apply. Players may hold more than one non-FIFA nationality.

No.	Pos.	Nation	Player
3	DF	JPN	Daiki Nishioka (loan to Tochigi SC)
18	FW	JPN	Ryuichi Hirashige (Transferred to Thespa Kusatsu)
22	DF	JPN	Tsubasa Yokotake (loan to Gainare Tottori)
24	DF	JPN	Ryota Moriwaki (Transferred to Urawa Red Diamonds)
25	FW	JPN	Junya Osaki (loan to Tokushima Vortis)
30	DF	JPN	Shinji Tsujio (loan return to Shimizu S-Pulse)

=== Oita Trinita ===
In Note: Flags indicate national team as defined under FIFA eligibility rules; some limited exceptions apply. Players may hold more than one non-FIFA nationality.

No.	Pos.	Nation	Player
2	DF	JPN	Arata Kodama (Transferred from Cerezo Osaka)
4	DF	JPN	Yuki Fukaya (Transferred from Omiya Ardija)
7	MF	JPN	Yuji Kimura (Transferred from Giravanz Kitakyushu)
9	FW	JPN	Rui Komatsu (Transferred to Kawasaki Frontale)
17	MF	JPN	Rei Matsumoto (loan from Yokohama F. Marinos)
18	DF	JPN	Kazumichi Takagi (Transferred from Vissel Kobe)
19	DF	JPN	Shinji Tsujio (Transferred from Shimizu S-Pulse)
25	GK	KOR	Kim Yeong-Gi (Transferred from Shonan Bellmare)
26	FW	JPN	Yusuke Goto (loan return from Hoyo Oita)
29	MF	JPN	Masaya Matsumoto (Drafted from JFA Academy Fukushima)
30	MF	BRA	Rodrigo Mancha (Transferred from (Brazil) Vitória)

Out Note: Flags indicate national team as defined under FIFA eligibility rules; some limited exceptions apply. Players may hold more than one non-FIFA nationality.

No.	Pos.	Nation	Player
4	DF	JPN	Yuji Sakuda (Transferred to Montedio Yamagata)
7	MF	JPN	Koki Kotegawa (Transferred to Giravanz Kitakyushu)
9	FW	JPN	Kazushi Mitsuhira (loan return to Shonan Bellmare)
14	MF	JPN	Yudai Inoue (loan to V-Varen Nagasaki)
17	DF	JPN	Naoya Ishigami (loan return to Shonan Bellmare)
18	FW	KOR	Lee Dong-Myung (Transferred to (South Korea) Daegu FC)
19	DF	KOR	Kim Chang-Hun (loan return to Cerezo Osaka)
23	DF	JPN	Ryosuke Tada (loan return to Cerezo Osaka)
25	MF	JPN	Naoto Noguchi (loan return to Cerezo Osaka)
—	DF	JPN	Yuji Fujikawa (Released, previously on loan at Matsumoto Yamaga)

=== FC Tokyo ===
In Note: Flags indicate national team as defined under FIFA eligibility rules; some limited exceptions apply. Players may hold more than one non-FIFA nationality.

No.	Pos.	Nation	Player
11	FW	JPN	Tadanari Lee (loan from (England) Southampton F.C.)
26	DF	JPN	Takumi Abe (loan return from Yokohama FC)
29	DF	JPN	Kazunori Yoshimoto (loan return from Mito HollyHock)
34	MF	JPN	Hideyuki Nozawa (Promoted from youth team)
36	MF	JPN	Hirotaka Mita (Drafted from Meiji University)
38	MF	JPN	Keigo Higashi (Transferred from Omiya Ardija)

Out Note: Flags indicate national team as defined under FIFA eligibility rules; some limited exceptions apply. Players may hold more than one non-FIFA nationality.

No.	Pos.	Nation	Player
9	FW	BRA	Edmilson (loan return to (Qatar) Al-Gharafa SC)
10	MF	JPN	Yohei Kajiyama (loan to (Greece) Panathinaikos F.C.)
22	MF	JPN	Naotake Hanyu (loan to Ventforet Kofu)
31	GK	JPN	Satoshi Tokizawa (Transferred to Montedio Yamagata)
33	DF	JPN	Kenta Mukuhara (loan to Cerezo Osaka)
—	MF	JPN	Shuto Kono (loan to V-Varen Nagasaki, previously on loan at Machida Zelvia)
—	MF	JPN	Kohei Shimoda (Transferred to V-Varen, previously on loan at Zelvia)
—	FW	JPN	Kentaro Shigematsu (loan to Ehime FC, previously on loan at Ventforet Kofu)
—	FW	BRA	Roberto César (loan to (South Korea) Ulsan Hyundai, previously on loan at (Brazil) Coritiba)

=== Ventforet Kofu ===
In Note: Flags indicate national team as defined under FIFA eligibility rules; some limited exceptions apply. Players may hold more than one non-FIFA nationality.

No.	Pos.	Nation	Player
8	MF	JPN	Ryohei Arai (Transferred from Giravanz Kitakyushu)
9	FW	BRA	Lenny (Transferred from (Brazil) Desportivo Brasil)
9	FW	PAR	José Ortigoza (Transferred from (China) Shandong Luneng)
11	FW	BRA	Hugo (Transferred from (Brazil) Paraná Clube)
15	FW	JPN	Akito Kawamoto (Drafted from Ryutsu Keizai University)
20	MF	JPN	Masahiro Kaneko (Drafted from Kokushikan University)
21	GK	JPN	Kohei Kawata (loan from Gamba Osaka)
22	MF	JPN	Naotake Hanyu (loan from FC Tokyo)
25	FW	JPN	Kazuki Hiramoto (loan from Tokyo Verdy)
26	DF	JPN	Naoaki Aoyama (Transferred from Yokohama F. Marinos)
28	FW	JPN	Yuki Hashizume (Drafted from Yamanashi Gakuin University)
29	MF	JPN	Koki Mizuno (Transferred from Kashiwa Reysol)
32	GK	JPN	Kosuke Okanishi (Drafted from Chuo University)
41	DF	JPN	Yukio Tsuchiya (Transferred from Tokyo Verdy)
—	MF	BRA	Marquinhos Paraná (Transferred from (Brazil) América Mineiro)

Out Note: Flags indicate national team as defined under FIFA eligibility rules; some limited exceptions apply. Players may hold more than one non-FIFA nationality.

No.	Pos.	Nation	Player
3	DF	JPN	Daisuke Tomita (Transferred to Mito HollyHock)
5	DF	BRA	Douglas (Released)
8	FW	JPN	Atsushi Katagiri (Released)
9	FW	JPN	Hiroyuki Takasaki (Transferred to Tokushima Vortis)
9	FW	BRA	Lenny (Released)
11	FW	BRA	Davi (loan return to (Qatar) Umm Salal SC)
14	MF	JPN	Genki Nagasato (Transferred to Gainare Tottori)
15	FW	JPN	Kota Aoki (loan return to JEF United Chiba)
20	MF	BRA	Fernandinho (Released)
21	GK	JPN	Masaki Kinoshita (Transferred to Nagano Parceiro)
25	FW	JPN	Shogo Fujimaki (Transferred to Fujieda MYFC)
26	FW	BRA	Renato (loan return to (Brazil) PSTC)
28	MF	JPN	Naoki Hatada (Transferred to Nagano Parceiro)
32	FW	JPN	Kentaro Shigematsu (loan return to FC Tokyo)
—	FW	BRA	Maranhão (Transferred to (South Korea) Jeju United, previously on loan at (South Korea) Ulsan Hyundai)

=== Vegalta Sendai ===
In Note: Flags indicate national team as defined under FIFA eligibility rules; some limited exceptions apply. Players may hold more than one non-FIFA nationality.

No.	Pos.	Nation	Player
4	DF	JPN	Toshio Shimakawa (loan return from Blaublitz Akita)
5	DF	JPN	Naoki Ishikawa (Transferred from Albirex Niigata)
14	MF	JPN	Hayato Sasaki (Transferred from Gamba Osaka)
15	MF	BRA	Heberty (Transferred from Thespa Kusatsu)
20	DF	JPN	Takuya Wada (Transferred from Tokyo Verdy)
21	GK	JPN	Kentaro Seki (loan return from Yokohama FC)
27	MF	BRA	Diogo (loan from (Brazil) Sport Recife)
28	DF	JPN	Koji Hachisuka (Drafted from Sendai University)

Out Note: Flags indicate national team as defined under FIFA eligibility rules; some limited exceptions apply. Players may hold more than one non-FIFA nationality.

No.	Pos.	Nation	Player
11	MF	JPN	Kunimitsu Sekiguchi (Transferred to Urawa Red Diamonds)
14	MF	BRA	Deyvid Sacconi (Released)
20	DF	JPN	Toshihiko Uchiyama (Retired)
21	GK	JPN	Yosuke Abe (Transferred to Zweigen Kanazawa)
22	GK	JPN	Kei Ishikawa (loan to Sony Sendai)
27	DF	KOR	Park Ju-Sung (Transferred to (South Korea) Gyeongnam FC)
28	DF	JPN	Keisuke Harada (loan to Tochigi SC)

== J.League Division 2 ==
=== Avispa Fukuoka ===
In Note: Flags indicate national team as defined under FIFA eligibility rules; some limited exceptions apply. Players may hold more than one non-FIFA nationality.

No.	Pos.	Nation	Player
4	DF	JPN	Takuya Miyamoto (Transferred from Montedio Yamagata)
7	MF	JPN	Jun Kanakubo (loan from Omiya Ardija)
8	MF	JPN	Yuji Funayama (Transferred from Montedio Yamagata)
13	DF	KOR	Park Gon (Drafted from (South Korea) University of Suwon)
20	MF	JPN	Shuto Nakahara (Drafted from Fukuoka University of Education)
23	GK	JPN	Yuichi Mizutani (Transferred from Kyoto Sanga FC)
24	FW	JPN	Takeshi Kanamori (Drafted from Chikuyo Gakuen High School)
26	MF	JPN	Yuta Mishima (Promoted from youth team)
27	MF	KOR	Jang Jung-won (Drafted from (South Korea) Hanam High School)

Out Note: Flags indicate national team as defined under FIFA eligibility rules; some limited exceptions apply. Players may hold more than one non-FIFA nationality.

No.	Pos.	Nation	Player
4	DF	JPN	Takumi Wada (Released)
7	MF	JPN	Toshiya Sueyoshi (Transferred to Sagan Tosu)
8	MF	JPN	Jun Suzuki (Transferred to Tokyo Verdy)
9	FW	BRA	Samir (Released)
11	FW	JPN	Yutaka Takahashi (Released)
13	DF	JPN	Shogo Kobara (Transferred to Ehime FC)
17	DF	KOR	Oh Chang-Hyun (loan to V-Varen Nagasaki)
19	MF	JPN	Sho Naruoka (Transferred to Albirex Niigata)
20	DF	JPN	Yosuke Miyaji (Released)
22	DF	JPN	Kosuke Yatsuda (Retired)
23	GK	JPN	Kohei Kawata (loan return to Gamba Osaka)
24	FW	JPN	Masato Yoshihara (Released)
26	MF	PRK	Son Jeong-ryun (Released)

=== Consadole Sapporo ===
In Note: Flags indicate national team as defined under FIFA eligibility rules; some limited exceptions apply. Players may hold more than one non-FIFA nationality.

No.	Pos.	Nation	Player
3	DF	BRA	Paulao (loan from (Brazil) Roma)
5	DF	KOR	Cho Song-Jin (Transferred from Kamatamare Sanuki)
9	FW	JPN	Junki Yokono (loan return from Zweigen Kanazawa)
18	MF	JPN	Kazuki Fukai (Promoted from youth team)
20	MF	JPN	Kazumasa Uesato (loan return from Tokushima Vortis)
21	GK	JPN	Shunta Awaka (Promoted from youth team)
27	DF	JPN	Ryota Matsumoto (Drafted from Toyo University)
28	MF	JPN	Yumemi Kanda (Promoted from youth team)
29	DF	JPN	Yuto Nagasaka (Promoted from youth team)
31	MF	JPN	Yuto Horigome (Promoted from youth team)
32	MF	JPN	Shogo Nakahara (Promoted from youth team)

Out Note: Flags indicate national team as defined under FIFA eligibility rules; some limited exceptions apply. Players may hold more than one non-FIFA nationality.

No.	Pos.	Nation	Player
1	GK	JPN	Takahiro Takagi (Transferred to FC Gifu)
3	DF	AUS	Jade North (Transferred to (Australia) Brisbane Roar)
5	MF	JPN	Masaki Yamamoto (Transferred to Kawasaki Frontale)
6	DF	JPN	Shunsuke Iwanuma (Transferred to Matsumoto Yamaga)
7	MF	JPN	Jumpei Takaki (Transferred to Shimizu S-Pulse)
9	FW	JPN	Masashi Nakayama (Retired)
14	MF	JPN	Issei Takayanagi (Transferred to Vissel Kobe)
18	MF	JPN	Hironobu Haga (Retired)
21	GK	JPN	Toshiyasu Takahara (Transferred to Shimizu S-Pulse)
23	FW	JPN	Hideo Oshima (Transferred to Giravanz Kitakyushu)
32	FW	JPN	Yusuke Kondo (Transferred to Tochigi SC)
34	DF	JPN	Kazunari Okayama (Released)
37	MF	BRA	Ramón (Transferred to (Brazil) Remo)
39	DF	KOR	Kim Jae-Hoan (loan return to (South Korea) Jeonbuk Hyundai Motors)

=== Ehime FC ===
In Note: Flags indicate national team as defined under FIFA eligibility rules; some limited exceptions apply. Players may hold more than one non-FIFA nationality.

No.	Pos.	Nation	Player
1	GK	JPN	Shogo Onishi (Drafted from Kindai University)
6	DF	JPN	Kohei Mihara (loan from Shonan Bellmare)
8	MF	JPN	Keiji Yoshimura (Transferred from Nagoya Grampus)
9	FW	JPN	Kentaro Shigematsu (loan from FC Tokyo)
15	DF	JPN	Shogo Kobara (Transferred from Avispa Fukuoka)
17	DF	JPN	Kyohei Kuroki (loan from Sagan Tosu)
19	FW	JPN	Ryota Watanabe (Drafted from Nippon Sport Science University)
20	MF	JPN	Kazuhisa Kawahara (Transferred from Tochigi SC)
23	MF	JPN	Sho Matsumoto (loan from Yokohama F. Marinos)
24	MF	JPN	Yuta Ito (loan from Kyoto Sanga FC)

Out Note: Flags indicate national team as defined under FIFA eligibility rules; some limited exceptions apply. Players may hold more than one non-FIFA nationality.

No.	Pos.	Nation	Player
1	GK	JPN	Yusuke Kawakita (Retired)
6	MF	JPN	Daiki Tamori (Transferred to Kyoto Sanga FC)
7	DF	JPN	Takanori Maeno (Transferred to Kashima Antlers)
8	MF	JPN	Kenta Uchida (Transferred to Shimizu S-Pulse)
9	FW	JPN	Koki Arita (loan return to Vissel Kobe)
15	FW	JPN	Hikaru Kuba (loan to FC Ryukyu)
17	MF	JPN	Shunsuke Oyama (Transferred to Kataller Toyama)
19	MF	JPN	Ryosuke Ochi (Transferred to Zweigen Kanazawa)
20	FW	JPN	Susumu Oki (Retired)
23	FW	JPN	Yusei Ogasawara (Transferred to V-Varen Nagasaki)
24	FW	JPN	Kenji Fukuda (Transferred to Yokohama FC Hong Kong)
28	DF	JPN	Ryota Takasugi (Transferred to V-Varen Nagasaki)
34	MF	JPN	Shun Ito (loan return to Montedio Yamagata)

=== Fagiano Okayama ===
In Note: Flags indicate national team as defined under FIFA eligibility rules; some limited exceptions apply. Players may hold more than one non-FIFA nationality.

No.	Pos.	Nation	Player
9	FW	JPN	Tomoyuki Arata (Transferred from Júbilo Iwata)
14	FW	JPN	Yuki Oshitani (loan from Júbilo Iwata)
17	MF	JPN	Takafumi Suzuki (Transferred from Machida Zelvia)
19	FW	JPN	Shingo Kukita (loan return from Matsumoto Yamaga)
30	MF	KOR	Lee Jae-Kwan (Drafted from (South Korea) Korea University)

Out Note: Flags indicate national team as defined under FIFA eligibility rules; some limited exceptions apply. Players may hold more than one non-FIFA nationality.

No.	Pos.	Nation	Player
7	MF	KOR	Kim Min-Kyun (Transferred to (Poland) Jagiellonia Białystok)
9	FW	BRA	Anderson (loan return to Albirex Niigata)
10	FW	BRA	Tiago (Released)
17	MF	JPN	Kota Hattori (Retired)
20	FW	JPN	Kengo Kawamata (loan return to Albirex Niigata)
29	MF	JPN	Tsubasa Oya (loan return to Vissel Kobe)
—	GK	JPN	Daisuke Nakamaki (Retired, previously on loan at FC Ryukyu)
—	DF	JPN	Yasuhiro Nomoto (Retired, previously on loan at Blaublitz Akita)
—	DF	JPN	Yugo Ichiyanagi (Transferred to FC Ryukyu, previously on loan at Matsumoto Yamaga)

=== Gainare Tottori ===
In: Note: Flags indicate national team as defined under FIFA eligibility rules; some limited exceptions apply. Players may hold more than one non-FIFA nationality.

No.	Pos.	Nation	Player
1	GK	JPN	Jun Kamita (loan from Vissel Kobe)
2	DF	JPN	Masaki Yanagawa (Transferred from Tochigi SC)
6	DF	BRA	Rafael (Transferred from (Venezuela) Carabobo FC)
7	MF	JPN	Tsubasa Yokotake (loan from Sanfrecce Hiroshima)
8	MF	BRA	Reginaldo (Transferred from (Brazil) Itapirense)
9	FW	BRA	Bruno (Transferred from (Brazil) S. E. Palmeiras B)
11	FW	JPN	Tatsuya Okamoto (Transferred from Mito HollyHock)
15	DF	JPN	Yudai Tanaka (loan from Kawasaki Frontale)
16	DF	JPN	Eijiro Takeda (loan from Yokohama F. Marinos)
20	FW	JPN	Masao Tsuji (Transferred from Y.S.C.C.)
24	MF	JPN	Ryuji Hirota (loan from Vissel Kobe)
26	FW	JPN	Genki Nagasato (Transferred from Ventforet Kofu)
27	DF	KOR	Lim Dong-Hyun (Transferred from (South Korea) F.C. Henan)
29	GK	JPN	Ryota Inoue (Drafted from National Institute of Fitness and Sports in Kanoya)

Out: Note: Flags indicate national team as defined under FIFA eligibility rules; some limited exceptions apply. Players may hold more than one non-FIFA nationality.

No.	Pos.	Nation	Player
1	GK	JPN	Atsushi Inoue (Retired)
3	DF	JPN	Hidenori Kato (Transferred to Veertien F.C.)
7	MF	JPN	Shota Koide (Transferred to (Thailand) Nakhon Ratchasima FC)
8	MF	JPN	Atsushi Mio (Transferred to FC Gifu)
15	DF	JPN	Yasumichi Uchima (Retired)
16	MF	KOR	Kim Sung-Min (Released)
18	DF	JPN	Nobutaka Suzuki (Transferred to F.C. Kagoshima)
20	DF	CRC	Roy Smith (Transferred to (Bolivia) The Strongest)
21	GK	JPN	Takahide Kishi (loan return to Vissel Kobe)
23	DF	JPN	Katsunari Mizumoto (Transferred to F.C. Kagoshima)
24	MF	JPN	Keisuke Kumazawa (Transferred to Toyota Shukyudan)
26	DF	JPN	Shuji Fujimoto (loan return to JEF United Chiba)
28	MF	JPN	Akito Miura (Transferred to FC Ryukyu)
29	FW	JPN	Masato Fukui (Transferred to (Singapore) Home United FC)
31	MF	JPN	Ryo Nishio (Retired)
—	GK	JPN	Daisuke Tada (Released, previously on loan at FC Gifu)

=== Gamba Osaka ===
In: Note: Flags indicate national team as defined under FIFA eligibility rules; some limited exceptions apply. Players may hold more than one non-FIFA nationality.

No.	Pos.	Nation	Player
2	DF	KOR	Oh Jae-Suk (Transferred from (South Korea) Gangwon FC)
14	FW	JPN	Shoki Hirai (loan return from Albirex Niigata)
24	FW	JPN	Kenta Hoshihara (loan return from Mito HollyHock)
25	MF	JPN	Kenya Okazaki (Drafted from Kansai University)
—	FW	KOR	Lee Seung-Yeoul (loan return from (South Korea) Ulsan Hyundai)

Out: Note: Flags indicate national team as defined under FIFA eligibility rules; some limited exceptions apply. Players may hold more than one non-FIFA nationality.

No.	Pos.	Nation	Player
2	DF	JPN	Sota Nakazawa (Transferred to Kawasaki Frontale)
3	DF	KOR	Kim Jung-Ya (loan to Sagan Tosu)
6	MF	JPN	Shigeru Yokotani (loan to Kyoto Sanga FC)
7	MF	JPN	Hayato Sasaki (Transferred to Vegalta Sendai)
22	GK	JPN	Yohei Takeda (loan return to Shimizu S-Pulse)
30	DF	BRA	Eduardo (loan return to (Brazil) Taboão da Serra)
—	GK	JPN	Kohei Kawata (loan to Ventforet Kofu, previously on loan at Avispa Fukuoka)
—	FW	KOR	Lee Seung-Yeoul (Transferred to (South Korea) Seongnam Ilhwa Chunma)

=== FC Gifu ===
In Note: Flags indicate national team as defined under FIFA eligibility rules; some limited exceptions apply. Players may hold more than one non-FIFA nationality.

No.	Pos.	Nation	Player

Out Note: Flags indicate national team as defined under FIFA eligibility rules; some limited exceptions apply. Players may hold more than one non-FIFA nationality.

No.	Pos.	Nation	Player

=== Giravanz Kitakyushu ===
In Note: Flags indicate national team as defined under FIFA eligibility rules; some limited exceptions apply. Players may hold more than one non-FIFA nationality.

No.	Pos.	Nation	Player

Out Note: Flags indicate national team as defined under FIFA eligibility rules; some limited exceptions apply. Players may hold more than one non-FIFA nationality.

No.	Pos.	Nation	Player

=== Mito HollyHock ===
In Note: Flags indicate national team as defined under FIFA eligibility rules; some limited exceptions apply. Players may hold more than one non-FIFA nationality.

No.	Pos.	Nation	Player

Out Note: Flags indicate national team as defined under FIFA eligibility rules; some limited exceptions apply. Players may hold more than one non-FIFA nationality.

No.	Pos.	Nation	Player

=== JEF United Chiba ===
In Note: Flags indicate national team as defined under FIFA eligibility rules; some limited exceptions apply. Players may hold more than one non-FIFA nationality.

No.	Pos.	Nation	Player
20	DF	KOR	Kim Hyun-Hun (Drafted from (South Korea) Hongik University)
22	FW	BRA	Jair (Transferred from (South Korea) Jeju United)
23	MF	KOR	Nam Seung-Woo (Drafted from (South Korea) Yonsei University)
24	DF	JPN	Shuji Fujimoto (loan return from Gainare Tottori)
29	DF	JPN	Naoki Kuriyama (Drafted from Senshu University)
31	GK	JPN	Kenpei Usui (Transferred from Shimizu S-Pulse)
37	FW	BRA	Kempes (Transferred from (Brazil) Portuguesa)

Out Note: Flags indicate national team as defined under FIFA eligibility rules; some limited exceptions apply. Players may hold more than one non-FIFA nationality.

No.	Pos.	Nation	Player
2	MF	JPN	Masataka Sakamoto (Retired)
8	FW	NOR	Tor Hogne Aarøy (Released)
14	FW	JPN	Tomoyuki Arata (loan return to Júbilo Iwata)
18	FW	JPN	Yoshihito Fujita (Transferred to Yokohama F. Marinos)
23	DF	JPN	Eijiro Takeda (loan return to Yokohama F. Marinos)
31	GK	JPN	Shinnosuke Sato (Transferred to Roasso Kumamoto)
—	MF	JPN	Tsukasa Masuyama (Transferred to FC Gifu, previously on loan at Matsumoto Yamaga)
—	FW	JPN	Kota Aoki (Transferred to Thespa Kusatsu, previously on loan at Ventforet Kofu)

=== Kataller Toyama ===
In Note: Flags indicate national team as defined under FIFA eligibility rules; some limited exceptions apply. Players may hold more than one non-FIFA nationality.

No.	Pos.	Nation	Player

Out Note: Flags indicate national team as defined under FIFA eligibility rules; some limited exceptions apply. Players may hold more than one non-FIFA nationality.

No.	Pos.	Nation	Player

=== Montedio Yamagata ===
In Note: Flags indicate national team as defined under FIFA eligibility rules; some limited exceptions apply. Players may hold more than one non-FIFA nationality.

No.	Pos.	Nation	Player

Out Note: Flags indicate national team as defined under FIFA eligibility rules; some limited exceptions apply. Players may hold more than one non-FIFA nationality.

No.	Pos.	Nation	Player

=== Roasso Kumamoto ===
In Note: Flags indicate national team as defined under FIFA eligibility rules; some limited exceptions apply. Players may hold more than one non-FIFA nationality.

No.	Pos.	Nation	Player

Out Note: Flags indicate national team as defined under FIFA eligibility rules; some limited exceptions apply. Players may hold more than one non-FIFA nationality.

No.	Pos.	Nation	Player

=== Kyoto Sanga FC ===
In Note: Flags indicate national team as defined under FIFA eligibility rules; some limited exceptions apply. Players may hold more than one non-FIFA nationality.

No.	Pos.	Nation	Player

Out Note: Flags indicate national team as defined under FIFA eligibility rules; some limited exceptions apply. Players may hold more than one non-FIFA nationality.

No.	Pos.	Nation	Player

=== Thespa Kusatsu ===
In Note: Flags indicate national team as defined under FIFA eligibility rules; some limited exceptions apply. Players may hold more than one non-FIFA nationality.

No.	Pos.	Nation	Player

Out Note: Flags indicate national team as defined under FIFA eligibility rules; some limited exceptions apply. Players may hold more than one non-FIFA nationality.

No.	Pos.	Nation	Player

=== Tochigi SC ===
In Note: Flags indicate national team as defined under FIFA eligibility rules; some limited exceptions apply. Players may hold more than one non-FIFA nationality.

No.	Pos.	Nation	Player

Out Note: Flags indicate national team as defined under FIFA eligibility rules; some limited exceptions apply. Players may hold more than one non-FIFA nationality.

No.	Pos.	Nation	Player

=== Tokyo Verdy ===
In Note: Flags indicate national team as defined under FIFA eligibility rules; some limited exceptions apply. Players may hold more than one non-FIFA nationality.

No.	Pos.	Nation	Player

Out Note: Flags indicate national team as defined under FIFA eligibility rules; some limited exceptions apply. Players may hold more than one non-FIFA nationality.

No.	Pos.	Nation	Player

=== Tokushima Vortis ===
In Note: Flags indicate national team as defined under FIFA eligibility rules; some limited exceptions apply. Players may hold more than one non-FIFA nationality.

No.	Pos.	Nation	Player

Out Note: Flags indicate national team as defined under FIFA eligibility rules; some limited exceptions apply. Players may hold more than one non-FIFA nationality.

No.	Pos.	Nation	Player

=== Matsumoto Yamaga ===
In Note: Flags indicate national team as defined under FIFA eligibility rules; some limited exceptions apply. Players may hold more than one non-FIFA nationality.

No.	Pos.	Nation	Player

Out Note: Flags indicate national team as defined under FIFA eligibility rules; some limited exceptions apply. Players may hold more than one non-FIFA nationality.

No.	Pos.	Nation	Player

=== Vissel Kobe ===
In: Note: Flags indicate national team as defined under FIFA eligibility rules; some limited exceptions apply. Players may hold more than one non-FIFA nationality.

No.	Pos.	Nation	Player
6	MF	COL	Estiven (Transferred from (South Korea) Ulsan Hyundai)
7	FW	BRA	Popó (Transferred from Urawa Red Diamonds)
8	FW	BRA	Mazinho (loan from (Brazil) Palmeiras)

Out: Note: Flags indicate national team as defined under FIFA eligibility rules; some limited exceptions apply. Players may hold more than one non-FIFA nationality.

No.	Pos.	Nation	Player

=== V-Varen Nagasaki ===
In Note: Flags indicate national team as defined under FIFA eligibility rules; some limited exceptions apply. Players may hold more than one non-FIFA nationality.

No.	Pos.	Nation	Player

Out Note: Flags indicate national team as defined under FIFA eligibility rules; some limited exceptions apply. Players may hold more than one non-FIFA nationality.

No.	Pos.	Nation	Player

=== Yokohama FC ===
In Note: Flags indicate national team as defined under FIFA eligibility rules; some limited exceptions apply. Players may hold more than one non-FIFA nationality.

No.	Pos.	Nation	Player

Out Note: Flags indicate national team as defined under FIFA eligibility rules; some limited exceptions apply. Players may hold more than one non-FIFA nationality.

No.	Pos.	Nation	Player
