= Japan Club Youth U-18 Football Championship =

- Founded: 1977
- Region: Japan
- Teams: 32
- Current champions: Kashima Antlers (1st title)
- Most championships: Tokyo Verdy (14 titles)
- Website: JFA
- 2024 Japan Club Youth U-18 Football Championship

The Japan Club Youth U-18 Championship (日本クラブユースサッカー選手権 (U-18)大会, Nihon kurabu yūsu sakkā senshuken U-18 taikai) is an annual nationwide association football tournament for youth clubs in Japan. It is restricted to members of the Japan Club Youth Football Federation.

Usually held during the summer, the competition's current format comprises 32 teams from 9 regions, which wins a spot in each competition through regional qualification. Similar to the FIFA World Cup, it starts on the group stage, with eight groups of four teams, with the best two of each advancing to the knockout stage.

== Finals ==
Season	Winner	Score	Runners–up
1977	Hirakata FC	-	Yomiuri Club
1978	Kobe FC	-	Yomiuri Club
1979	Yomiuri A	-	Kobe FC
1980	Mitsubishi Yowa; Yomiuri FC	-	Shared title
1981	Yomiuri A	-	Mitsubishi Yowa
1982	Yokohama FC	-	Mitsubishi Yowa
1983	Mitsubishi Yowa SC	-	Yokohama Three Star
1984	Hirakata FC	-	All-Japan Airways
1985	Yomiuri A	-	Hirakata FC
1986	Yomiuri A	-	Mitsubishi Yowa
1987	ANA Yokohama	-	Mitsubishi Yowa
1988	Yomiuri A	-	Mitsubishi Yowa
1989	Yomiuri	-	Mitsubishi Yowa
1990	Yomiuri	-	FC Machida
1991	Yomiuri	-	Hirakata FC
1992	Yomiuri	-	Matsushita FC
1993	Yomiuri	-	Mitsubishi Yowa
1994	Yokohama Marinos	-	Cerezo Osaka
1995	Yokohama Marinos	-	Panasonic Gamba Osaka
1996	Cerezo Osaka	-	Yokohama Marinos
1997	Urawa Red Diamonds	-	Kashima Antlers
1998	Gamba Osaka	-	JEF United Ichihara Chiba
1999	Júbilo Iwata	2–1	Bellmare Hiratsuka
2000	Yokohama F. Marinos	2–0	Kyoto Purple Sanga
2001	FC Tokyo	2–0	Hokkaido Consadole Sapporo
2002	Shimizu S-Pulse	1–0	Urawa Red Diamonds
2003	Sanfrecce Hiroshima	3–0	Urawa Red Diamonds
2004	Sanfrecce Hiroshima	4–1	Júbilo Iwata
2005	Tokyo Verdy	1–0	Yokohama F. Marinos
2006	Gamba Osaka	1–0	Tokyo Verdy
2007	Gamba Osaka	4–2	Júbilo Iwata
2008	FC Tokyo	1–0	Kashiwa Reysol
2009	Cerezo Osaka	1–0	FC Tokyo
2010	Tokyo Verdy	2–1	Kashiwa Reysol
2011	Tokyo Verdy	1–0	Vissel Kobe
2012	Kashiwa Reysol	3–2	Yokohama F. Marinos
2013	Yokohama F. Marinos	4–1	Sanfrecce Hiroshima
2014	Mitsubishi Yowa	1–0	FC Tokyo
2015	Yokohama F. Marinos	5–3	Omiya Ardija
2016	FC Tokyo	2–0	Shimizu S-Pulse
2017	FC Tokyo	2–0	Urawa Red Diamonds
2018	Shimizu S-Pulse	2–0	Omiya Ardija
2019	Nagoya Grampus	3–1	Sagan Tosu
2020	Sagan Tosu	3–2	FC Tokyo
2021	Nagoya Grampus	2–0	Hokkaido Consadole Sapporo
2022	Cerezo Osaka	3–1	Yokohama F. Marinos
2023	Gamba Osaka	3–3 (5–4 p.)	FC Tokyo
2024	Gamba Osaka	3–2	Kawasaki Frontale

=== Most successful clubs ===
P.	Team	Champions	Runners-up	Winning years
1	Tokyo Verdy (Note: Includes Yomiuri Club and Yomiuri A)	14	3	1979, 1980, 1981, 1985, 1986, 1988, 1989, 1990, 1991, 1992, 1993, 2005, 2010, 2011
2	Yokohama F. Marinos (Note: Includes Yokohama Marinos)	6	4	1987, 1994, 1995, 2000, 2013, 2015
3	Gamba Osaka (Note: Includes Matsushita FC and Panasonic Gamba Osaka)	5	2	1998, 2006, 2007, 2023, 2024
4	FC Tokyo	4	4	2001, 2008, 2016, 2017
5	Mitsubishi Yowa	3	7	1980, 1983, 2014
5	Cerezo Osaka	3	1	1996, 2009, 2022
7	Hirakata FC	2	2	1977, 1984
7	Sanfrecce Hiroshima	2	1	2003, 2004
7	Shimizu S-Pulse	2	1	2002, 2018
7	Nagoya Grampus	2	0	2019, 2021
11	Urawa Red Diamonds	1	3	1997
11	Vissel Kobe	1	2	1978
11	Júbilo Iwata	1	2	1999
11	Kashiwa Reysol	1	2	2012
11	Sagan Tosu	1	1	2020
11	Yokohama FC	1	0	1982
18	All-Japan Airways Yokohama (Note: Includes All-Japan Airways and ANA Yokohama)	0	2	
18	Hokkaido Consadole Sapporo	0	2	
18	Omiya Ardija	0	2	
18	Machida Zelvia (Note: Includes FC Machida)	0	1	
18	Kashima Antlers	0	1	
18	JEF United Chiba (Note: Includes JEF United Ichihara Chiba)	0	1	
18	Shonan Bellmare (Note: Includes Bellmare Hiratsuka)	0	1	
18	Kyoto Sanga (Note: Includes Kyoto Purple Sanga)	0	1	

== Individual awards ==
Year	MVP	Top Scorer
2001	Yuta Baba (FC Tokyo)	Tatsunori Arai (Hokkaido Consadole Sapporo)
2002		
2003	Yusuke Tasaka (Sanfrecce Hiroshima)	
2004	Shunsuke Maeda (Sanfrecce Hiroshima)	Shunsuke Maeda (Sanfrecce Hiroshima)
2005	Kohei Kiyama (Tokyo Verdy)	Kenta Hoshihara (Gamba Osaka)
2006	Shu Kurata (Gamba Osaka)	Shota Kimura (Yokohama F. Marinos)
2007	Kodai Yasuda (Gamba Osaka)	Yuki Oshitani (Júbilo Iwata)
2008	Hirotaka Mita (FC Tokyo)	Kentaro Shigematsu (FC Tokyo); Masato Kudo (Kashiwa Reysol)
2009	Kenyu Sugimoto (Cerezo Osaka)	Ryoga Sekihara (Yokohama F. Marinos); Sho Matsumoto (Yokohama F. Marinos)
2010	Yuki Kobayashi (Tokyo Verdy)	Kenshiro Kanemura (Yokohama FC)
2011	Ryuji Sugimoto (Tokyo Verdy)	Shuto Minami (Tokyo Verdy); Masato Tairaku (Kashiwa Reysol); Kosuke Kinoshita (Yokohama FC); Motoki Takahara (Nagoya Grampus)
2012	Hiroki Akino (Kashiwa Reysol)	Kosuke Kinoshita (Yokohama FC)
2013	Koya Yuruki (Yokohama F. Marinos)	Koya Kitagawa (Shimizu S-Pulse)
2014	Yuya Shimoda (Mitsubishi Yowa)	Yudai Hasukawa (FC Tokyo); Akira Silvano Disaro (Mitsubishi Yowa)
2015	Keita Endo (Yokohama F. Marinos)	Keita Endo (Yokohama F. Marinos)
2016	Yosuke Hanya (FC Tokyo)	Tsuyoshi Ogashiwa (Omiya Ardija); Yuta Taki (Shimizu S-Pulse); Takefusa Kubo (FC Tokyo)
2017	Kan Kobayashi (FC Tokyo)	Taichi Hara (FC Tokyo); Shogo Ikeda (Gamba Osaka)
2018	Togo Umeda (Shimizu S-Pulse)	Shoi Kobayashi (Omiya Ardija)
2019	Takeshi Ushizawa (Nagoya Grampus)	Ken Masui (Nagoya Grampus)
2020	Kodai Nagata (Sagan Tosu)	Zen Tanaka (Sagan Tosu)
2021	Gen Kato (Nagoya Grampus)	Hayato Manabe (Nagoya Grampus)
2022	Hinata Kawai (Cerezo Osaka)	Ota Yamamoto (Kashiwa Reysol)
2023	Rui Araki (Gamba Osaka)	Hikaru Muraki (Fagiano Okayama)
