= Hashizume =

Hashizume (written: 橋爪) is a Japanese surname. Notable people with the surname include:

- Isao Hashizume (橋爪 功, born 1941), Japanese actor
- Jun Hashizume (橋爪 淳, born 1960), Japanese actor
- Mika Hashizume (橋爪 ミカ, born 1998), Japanese-American singer
- Shiro Hashizume (橋爪 四郎, born 1928), Japanese swimmer
- Yuki Hashizume (橋爪 勇樹, born 1990), Japanese footballer
