= Chang-hoon =

- Hangul: 창훈
- RR: Changhun
- MR: Ch'anghun

Chang-hoon is a Korean given name.

People with this name include:

- Lee Chang-hoon (athlete) (1935–2004), Korean long-distance runner
- Lee Chang-hoon (actor) (born 1966), South Korean actor
- Lee Chang-hoon (footballer) (born 1986), South Korean football player
- Kim Chang-hoon (born 1987), South Korean football player
- Kim Chang-hun (born 1990), South Korean football player

Fictional characters with this name include:

- Chang-hoon, in 2002 South Korean film Phone
- Lee Chang-hoon, in 2013 South Korean television series You Are the Best!

== See also ==
- List of Korean given names
