= 2024 Japan Club Youth U-18 Football Championship =

Tournament details
- Country: Japan
- Dates: 22–31 July 2024
- Teams: 32

Final positions
- Champions: Gamba Osaka (5th title)
- Runner-up: Kawasaki Frontale

The 2024 Japan Club Youth U-18 Football Championship (Japanese: 第48回 日本クラブユースサッカー選手権(U-18)大会) was the 48th edition of the contested tournament, held exclusively for Japan youth clubs affiliated with both J.League and Japan Club Youth Football Federation. Gamba Osaka defended their title, winning it consecutively on 2023 and 2024.

== Outline ==
As usual, the tournament was held with 32 participating teams. With no direct entry or automatic qualification for the tournament, all participants had to qualify through regional qualification. The number of slots for each region were predetermined by the JFA prior to the qualifiers. The determined slot distribution was as follows:

| Slots | Region |
|---|---|
| 11 | Kanto |
| 5 | Kyushu |
| 4 | Kansai |
| 3 | Tohoku |
| 3 | Tokai |
| 2 | Hokushinetsu |
| 2 | Chugoku |
| 1 | Hokkaido |
| 1 | Shikoku |

The tournament started with a group stage, held with eight groups of four teams in each. Only the winner of each group qualifies for the quarter-finals. Each match during the group stage was 70-minutes long, with two 35-minute halves and a 10-minute halftime break. From the quarter-finals onwards, the matches was 80-minutes long, with two 40-minute halves and a 15-minute halftime break. In case of a draw, the match would directly proceed into penalty shoot-outs. On the final, a draw in regulation time would lead to a 20-minute extra-time, with penalty shoot-outs being held should the draw persists.

About suspensions by yellow or red cards:

- The qualifying rounds for this tournament was considered as the same competition for disciplinary reasons, and any unused suspensions due to red card offenses at the end of the qualifying rounds was applied in the tournament.
- A player who accumulates two yellow cards during the tournament would face a one-match suspension.
- Accumulated yellow cards given from the group stage to the quarterfinals would not be carried over to the semifinals. However, any unused suspensions given from the group stage to the quarterfinals was carried over to the semifinals and applied.

== Calendar ==
| Round | Date (original date) |
|---|---|
| Group stage | 22–26 July (22–25 July) |
| Quarter-finals | 26–27 July (26 July) |
| Semi-finals | 29 July |
| Final | 31 July |

== Schedule ==
=== Group stage ===
==== Group A ====
| Pos | Team | Pld | W | D | L | GF | GA | GD | Pts | Qualification or relegation |
|---|---|---|---|---|---|---|---|---|---|---|
| 1 | Omiya Ardija | 3 | 1 | 2 | 0 | 2 | 1 | +1 | 5 | Qualification for quarter-finals |
| 2 | Júbilo Iwata | 3 | 1 | 1 | 1 | 2 | 2 | 0 | 4 | |
| 3 | Fagiano Okayama | 3 | 0 | 3 | 0 | 1 | 1 | 0 | 3 | |
| 4 | Albirex Niigata | 3 | 0 | 2 | 1 | 1 | 2 | −1 | 2 | |

Source: JFA
Rules for classification: 1) Points; 2) Goal difference; 3) Number of goals scored; 4) Head-to-head performance; 5) Draw (random selection)

| 22 July | Omiya Ardija | 0–0 | Fagiano Okayama | Maebashi |
| 17:00 | | | | Stadium: Road Miyagi General Sports Park |

| 22 July | Júbilo Iwata | 1–0 | Albirex Niigata | Maebashi |
| 17:00 | Keita Atsumi 9' | | | Stadium: Ogo Multi Purpose Sports Park |

| 23 July | Omiya Ardija | 0–0 | Albirex Niigata | Maebashi |
| 17:00 | | | | Stadium: Road Miyagi General Sports Park |

| 23 July | Júbilo Iwata | 0–0 | Fagiano Okayama | Maebashi |
| 17:00 | | | | Stadium: Ogo Multi Purpose Sports Park |

| 26 July | Omiya Ardija | 2–1 | Júbilo Iwata | Maebashi |
| 18:00 | Kosei Saito 35+2'; Mark Isozaki 70+3' | | Shota Yamamoto 41' | Stadium: Road Miyagi General Sports Park |

| 26 July | Albirex Niigata | 1–1 | Fagiano Okayama | Maebashi |
| 18:00 | Ganta Ganaha 59' | | Kanon Yukutomo 70+3' | Stadium: Ogo Multi Purpose Sports Park |

==== Group B ====
| Pos | Team | Pld | W | D | L | GF | GA | GD | Pts | Qualification or relegation |
|---|---|---|---|---|---|---|---|---|---|---|
| 1 | Kawasaki Frontale | 3 | 2 | 0 | 1 | 6 | 2 | +4 | 6 | Qualification for quarter-finals |
| 2 | Vissel Kobe | 3 | 2 | 0 | 1 | 6 | 3 | +3 | 6 | |
| 3 | Sagan Tosu | 3 | 1 | 0 | 2 | 4 | 7 | −3 | 3 | |
| 4 | Blaublitz Akita | 3 | 1 | 0 | 2 | 2 | 6 | −4 | 3 | |

Source: JFA
Rules for classification: 1) Points; 2) Goal difference; 3) Number of goals scored; 4) Head-to-head performance; 5) Draw (random selection)

| 24 July | Kawasaki Frontale | 1–0 | Vissel Kobe | Maebashi |
| 18:00 | Yutaro Onda 50' | | | Stadium: Road Miyagi General Sports Park |

| 24 July | Sagan Tosu | 2–0 | Blaublitz Akita | Maebashi |
| 18:00 | Haruki Yamasaki 7'; Tomomichi Yoza 59' | | | Stadium: Ogo Multi Purpose Sports Park |

| 23 July | Kawasaki Frontale | 1–2 | Blaublitz Akita | Maebashi |
| 19:00 | Yutaro Onda 12' | | Kenta Kato 30', 59' | Stadium: Road Miyagi General Sports Park |

| 23 July | Sagan Tosu | 2–3 | Vissel Kobe | Maebashi |
| 19:00 | Haruki Yamasaki 10'; Aitaro Higashiguchi 14' | | Ran Yoshioka 18'; Kaito Yamada 35'; Taiga Seguchi 70+1' | Stadium: Ogo Multi Purpose Sports Park |

| 25 July | Kawasaki Frontale | 4–0 | Sagan Tosu | Maebashi |
| 19:00 | Shunsuke Hayashi 59'; Hayato Hiratsuka 60'; Takeshi Katori 67'; Yutaro Onda 70+4' | | | Stadium: Road Miyagi General Sports Park |

| 25 July | Blaublitz Akita | 0–3 | Vissel Kobe | Maebashi |
| 19:00 | | | Kento Hamasaki 33'; Oga Morita 49'; Taiga Seguchi 70+4' | Stadium: Ogo Multi Purpose Sports Park |

==== Group C ====
| Pos | Team | Pld | W | D | L | GF | GA | GD | Pts | Qualification or relegation |
|---|---|---|---|---|---|---|---|---|---|---|
| 1 | Shimizu S-Pulse | 3 | 2 | 1 | 0 | 10 | 3 | +7 | 7 | Qualification for quarter-finals |
| 2 | FC Tokyo | 3 | 2 | 0 | 1 | 6 | 3 | +3 | 6 | |
| 3 | Yokohama FC | 3 | 1 | 1 | 1 | 4 | 4 | 0 | 4 | |
| 4 | Nara Club | 3 | 0 | 0 | 3 | 2 | 12 | −10 | 0 | |

Source: JFA
Rules for classification: 1) Points; 2) Goal difference; 3) Number of goals scored; 4) Head-to-head performance; 5) Draw (random selection)

| 22 July | FC Tokyo | 3–0 | Nara Club | Miyazaki |
| 17:00 | Yuya Takahashi 30'; Yuta Sugawara 42'; Rui Asada 61' | | | Stadium: Amino Vital Training Center Football & Rugby Field |

| 22 July | Shimizu S-Pulse | 1–1 | Yokohama FC | Miyazaki |
| 17:00 | Seo Nakamura 8' | | Kantaro Maeda 32' | Stadium: Amino Vital Training Center Multipurpose Ground |

| 23 July | FC Tokyo | 1–0 | Yokohama FC | Miyazaki |
| 17:00 | Kio Tanaka 8' | | | Stadium: Amino Vital Training Center Football & Rugby Field |

| 23 July | Shimizu S-Pulse | 6–0 | Nara Club | Miyazaki |
| 17:00 | Hiroto Tashiro 17', 70+2'; Yuji Doi 34', 69'; Seo Nakamura 70'; Ryota Hariu 70+4' | | | Stadium: Amino Vital Training Center Multipurpose Ground |

| 25 July | FC Tokyo | 2–3 | Shimizu S-Pulse | Miyazaki |
| 17:00 | Kio Tanaka 48'; Taiyo Yamaguchi 70+1' | | Own goal 31' (o.g.); Hiroto Tashiro 35'; Yuji Doi 45' | Stadium: Amino Vital Training Center Football & Rugby Field |

| 25 July | Yokohama FC | 3–2 | Nara Club | Miyazaki |
| 17:00 | Kantaro Maeda 5'; Ryosuke Iwasaki 69'; Keitaro Shoji 70+7' | | Kira Kakizawa 2'; Cho Jae-sung 22' | Stadium: Amino Vital Training Center Multipurpose Ground |

==== Group D ====
| Pos | Team | Pld | W | D | L | GF | GA | GD | Pts | Qualification or relegation |
|---|---|---|---|---|---|---|---|---|---|---|
| 1 | Avispa Fukuoka | 3 | 3 | 0 | 0 | 6 | 2 | +4 | 9 | Qualification for quarter-finals |
| 2 | Kashiwa Reysol | 3 | 1 | 1 | 1 | 7 | 4 | +3 | 4 | |
| 3 | Yokohama F. Marinos | 3 | 1 | 1 | 1 | 3 | 4 | −1 | 4 | |
| 4 | Vegalta Sendai | 3 | 0 | 0 | 3 | 1 | 7 | −6 | 0 | |

Source: JFA
Rules for classification: 1) Points; 2) Goal difference; 3) Number of goals scored; 4) Head-to-head performance; 5) Draw (random selection)

| 22 July | Kashiwa Reysol | 2–2 | Yokohama F. Marinos | Miyazaki |
| 19:00 | Retsu Sawai 29'; Akito Toda 70+4' | | Kento Shirasu 8'; Kohei Mochizuki 52' | Stadium: Amino Vital Training Center Football & Rugby Field |

| 22 July | Avispa Fukuoka | 2–1 | Vegalta Sendai | Miyazaki |
| 19:00 | Abdul Hanan Sani Brown 17'; Takezo Fujikawa 68' | | Sota Yokoyama 46' | Stadium: Amino Vital Training Center Multipurpose Ground |

| 23 July | Kashiwa Reysol | 4–0 | Vegalta Sendai | Miyazaki |
| 19:00 | Mohamed Sadiki Wade 8', 24', 41'; Yuito Kamo 10' | | | Stadium: Amino Vital Training Center Football & Rugby Field |

| 23 July | Avispa Fukuoka | 2–0 | Yokohama F. Marinos | Miyazaki |
| 19:00 | Ichika Maeda 33'; Abdul Hanan Sani Brown 70+2' | | | Stadium: Amino Vital Training Center Multipurpose Ground |

| 25 July | Kashiwa Reysol | 1–2 | Avispa Fukuoka | Miyazaki |
| 19:00 | Mohamed Sadiki Wade 15' | | Ichika Maeda 27'; Yuma Narazaki 51' | Stadium: Amino Vital Training Center Football & Rugby Field |

| 25 July | Vegalta Sendai | 0–1 | Yokohama F. Marinos | Miyazaki |
| 19:00 | | | Kaiki Kato 52' | Stadium: Amino Vital Training Center Multipurpose Ground |

==== Group E ====
| Pos | Team | Pld | W | D | L | GF | GA | GD | Pts | Qualification or relegation |
|---|---|---|---|---|---|---|---|---|---|---|
| 1 | Nagoya Grampus | 3 | 3 | 0 | 0 | 11 | 4 | +7 | 9 | Qualification for quarter-finals |
| 2 | Ehime FC | 3 | 2 | 0 | 1 | 4 | 6 | −2 | 6 | |
| 3 | Tokyo Verdy | 3 | 0 | 1 | 2 | 3 | 5 | −2 | 1 | |
| 4 | Shonan Bellmare | 3 | 0 | 1 | 2 | 4 | 7 | −3 | 1 | |

Source: JFA
Rules for classification: 1) Points; 2) Goal difference; 3) Number of goals scored; 4) Head-to-head performance; 5) Draw (random selection)

| 22 July | Nagoya Grampus | 3–2 | Shonan Bellmare | Yamaguchi |
| 17:00 | Ritsu Onishi 2'; Naoto Nishimori 38'; Ryu Kanda 70+3' | | Kakeru Yamazaki 15'; Towa Terashita 47' | Stadium: Ishin Me-Life Stadium |

| 22 July | Tokyo Verdy | 0–1 | Ehime FC | Yamaguchi |
| 17:00 | Seigo Tagashira 47' | | | Stadium: Yamaguchi Kirara Haku Memorial Park Football & Rugby Field |

| 23 July | Nagoya Grampus | 5–0 | Ehime FC | Yamaguchi |
| 17:00 | Naoto Nishimori 25'; Own goal 32' (o.g.); Ryu Kanda 44'; Ritsu Onishi 54'; Ryoma Tsuneyoshi 65' | | | Stadium: Ishin Me-Life Stadium |

| 23 July | Tokyo Verdy | 1–1 | Shonan Bellmare | Yamaguchi |
| 17:00 | Gakuto Kawamura 22' | | Mibuki Kasai 57' | Stadium: Yamaguchi Kirara Haku Memorial Park Football & Rugby Field |

| 25 July | Nagoya Grampus | 3–2 | Tokyo Verdy | Yamaguchi |
| 17:00 | Ritsu Onishi 22'; Ryu Kanda 47'; Naoto Nishimori 50' | | Gakuto Kawamura 69'; Hikaru Tsuchiya 70+7' | Stadium: Ishin Me-Life Stadium |

| 25 July | Ehime FC | 3–1 | Shonan Bellmare | Yamaguchi |
| 17:00 | Shuto Kawazoe 6'; Issei Aoki 15', 38' | | Mibuki Kasai 48' | Stadium: Yamaguchi Kirara Haku Memorial Park Football & Rugby Field |

==== Group F ====
| Pos | Team | Pld | W | D | L | GF | GA | GD | Pts | Qualification or relegation |
|---|---|---|---|---|---|---|---|---|---|---|
| 1 | Sanfrecce Hiroshima | 3 | 3 | 0 | 0 | 6 | 1 | +5 | 9 | Qualification for quarter-finals |
| 2 | Kashima Antlers | 3 | 2 | 0 | 1 | 6 | 1 | +5 | 6 | |
| 3 | Kyoto Sanga | 3 | 0 | 1 | 2 | 3 | 6 | −3 | 1 | |
| 4 | Kagoshima United | 3 | 0 | 1 | 2 | 2 | 9 | −7 | 1 | |

Source: JFA
Rules for classification: 1) Points; 2) Goal difference; 3) Number of goals scored; 4) Head-to-head performance; 5) Draw (random selection)

| 22 July | Sanfrecce Hiroshima | 2–1 | Kyoto Sanga | Yamaguchi |
| 19:00 | Aren Inoue 15'; Ayuki Masutani 51' | | Haruto Tatsukawa 70' | Stadium: Ishin Me-Life Stadium |

| 22 July | Kashima Antlers | 4–0 | Kagoshima United | Yamaguchi |
| 19:00 | Minato Yoshida 14', 16', 34'; Ryunosuke Dobashi 22' | | | Stadium: Yamaguchi Kirara Haku Memorial Park Football & Rugby Field |

| 23 July | Sanfrecce Hiroshima | 3–0 | Kagoshima United | Yamaguchi |
| 19:00 | Aren Inoue 16'; Rento Noguchi 26'; Yotaro Nakajima 50' | | | Stadium: Ishin Me-Life Stadium |

| 23 July | Kashima Antlers | 2–0 | Kyoto Sanga | Yamaguchi |
| 19:00 | Minato Yoshida 7'; Shoma Ogasawara 70' | | | Stadium: Yamaguchi Kirara Haku Memorial Park Football & Rugby Field |

| 25 July | Sanfrecce Hiroshima | 1–0 | Kashima Antlers | Yamaguchi |
| 19:00 | Yotaro Nakajima 6' | | | Stadium: Ishin Me-Life Stadium |

| 25 July | Kagoshima United | 2–2 | Kyoto Sanga | Yamaguchi |
| 19:00 | Kai Hashiguchi 31'; Taichi Wada 60' | | Yushin Matsumoto 16'; Yu Masayama 32' | Stadium: Yamaguchi Kirara Haku Memorial Park Football & Rugby Field |

==== Group G ====
| Pos | Team | Pld | W | D | L | GF | GA | GD | Pts | Qualification or relegation |
|---|---|---|---|---|---|---|---|---|---|---|
| 1 | Urawa Red Diamonds | 3 | 2 | 1 | 0 | 7 | 1 | +6 | 7 | Qualification for quarter-finals |
| 2 | Nagano Parceiro | 3 | 1 | 1 | 1 | 3 | 3 | 0 | 4 | |
| 3 | V-Varen Nagasaki | 3 | 1 | 0 | 2 | 3 | 5 | −2 | 3 | |
| 4 | Hokkaido Consadole Sapporo | 3 | 1 | 0 | 2 | 2 | 6 | −4 | 3 | |

Source: JFA
Rules for classification: 1) Points; 2) Goal difference; 3) Number of goals scored; 4) Head-to-head performance; 5) Draw (random selection)

| 22 July | Hokkaido Consadole Sapporo | 0–3 | V-Varen Nagasaki | Sakai |
| 17:00 | | | Koki Uchiyama 6'; Hiota Ikeda 27'; Hinata Miyazaki 38' | Stadium: J-Green Sakai S1 |

| 22 July | Urawa Red Diamonds | 1–1 | Nagano Parceiro | Osaka |
| 17:00 | Kaito Yokoyama 68' | | Sora Miyatani 14' | Stadium: Yanmar Field Nagai |

| 23 July | Hokkaido Consadole Sapporo | 2–0 | Nagano Parceiro | Sakai |
| 17:00 | Kota Shonai 9'; Ryusei Nakamura 43' | | | Stadium: J-Green Sakai S1 |

| 23 July | Urawa Red Diamonds | 3–0 | V-Varen Nagasaki | Osaka |
| 17:00 | Katsutoshi Yamane 31'; Toshikazu Teruuchi 33', 49' | | | Stadium: Yanmar Field Nagai |

| 25 July | Hokkaido Consadole Sapporo | 0–3 | Urawa Red Diamonds | Sakai |
| 17:00 | | | Junei Tohoda 5'; Toshikazu Teruuchi 21'; Ibuki Matsuzaka 63' | Stadium: J-Green Sakai S1 |

| 25 July | Nagano Parceiro | 2–0 | V-Varen Nagasaki | Osaka |
| 17:00 | Sora Miyatani 33'; Takumi Waku 63' | | | Stadium: Yanmar Field Nagai |

==== Group H ====
| Pos | Team | Pld | W | D | L | GF | GA | GD | Pts | Qualification or relegation |
|---|---|---|---|---|---|---|---|---|---|---|
| 1 | Gamba Osaka | 3 | 3 | 0 | 0 | 6 | 0 | +6 | 9 | Qualification for quarter-finals |
| 2 | Ventforet Kofu | 3 | 1 | 1 | 1 | 4 | 5 | −1 | 4 | |
| 3 | Montedio Yamagata | 3 | 1 | 1 | 1 | 4 | 6 | −2 | 4 | |
| 4 | Oita Trinita | 3 | 0 | 0 | 3 | 2 | 5 | −3 | 0 | |

Source: JFA
Rules for classification: 1) Points; 2) Goal difference; 3) Number of goals scored; 4) Head-to-head performance; 5) Draw (random selection)

| 22 July | Gamba Osaka | 2–0 | Ventforet Kofu | Sakai |
| 19:00 | Shimpei Okura 29'; Kojiro Hisanaga 70+2' | | | Stadium: J-Green Sakai S1 |

| 22 July | Oita Trinita | 1–2 | Montedio Yamagata | Osaka |
| 19:00 | Seiryu Ono 37' | | Ryotaro Inoue 35'; Toji Mitobe 45' | Stadium: Yanmar Field Nagai |

| 23 July | Gamba Osaka | 3–0 | Montedio Yamagata | Sakai |
| 19:00 | Yuya Yokoi 41'; Takato Yamamoto 64'; Kojiro Hisanaga 70+5' | | | Stadium: J-Green Sakai S1 |

| 23 July | Oita Trinita | 1–2 | Ventforet Kofu | Osaka |
| 19:00 | Seiryu Ono 67' | | Hyuma Okura 45'; Sodai Ota 62' | Stadium: Yanmar Field Nagai |

| 25 July | Gamba Osaka | 1–0 | Oita Trinita | Sakai |
| 19:00 | Takato Yamamoto 35' | | | Stadium: J-Green Sakai S1 |

| 25 July | Montedio Yamagata | 2–2 | Ventforet Kofu | Osaka |
| 19:00 | Eiji Nagai 24', 70+7' | | Hiryu Okuma 69'; Yuzuki Oishi 70+6' | Stadium: Yanmar Field Nagai |

=== Quarter-finals ===
| 27 July Match 49 | Omiya Ardija | 0–4 | Kawasaki Frontale | Maebashi |
| 18:00 | | Report | Yutaro Onda 28'; Haruki Chiku 40+4'; Kaito Tsuchiya 49'; Haruki Kusuda 79' | Stadium: Ogo Multi Purpose Sports Park; Attendance: 100; Referee: Ryo Wakamatsu |

| 26 July Match 50 | Shimizu S-Pulse | 2–3 | Avispa Fukuoka | Miyazaki |
| 18:00 | Naruki Ishikawa 47'; Hiroto Tashiro 80+1' | Report | Shohei Takemoto 18'; Shido Ikeda 31'; Ichika Maeda 39' | Stadium: Amino Vital Training Center Football & Rugby Field; Attendance: 195; Referee: Ryo Ogawa |

| 26 July Match 51 | Nagoya Grampus | 2–1 | Sanfrecce Hiroshima | Yamaguchi |
| 18:00 | Ritsu Onishi 50'; Shungo Sugiura 74' | Report | Shimon Kobayashi 41' | Stadium: Ishin Me-Life Stadium; Attendance: 200; Referee: Ryo Fujita |

| 26 July Match 52 | Urawa Red Diamonds | 0–1 | Gamba Osaka | Sakai |
| 18:00 | | Report | Yuto Amano 60' | Stadium: J-Green Sakai; Attendance: 220; Referee: Kota Sato |

=== Semi-finals ===
| 29 July Match 53 | Kawasaki Frontale | 1–1 (9–8 p) | Avispa Fukuoka | Kita |
| 17:00 | Kaito Tsuchiya 80+3' | Report | Kanta Nakamura 63' | Stadium: Ajinomoto Field Nishigaoka; Attendance: 702; Referee: Satoshi Itaya |
| | Penalties |
| | Shotaro Shibata (penalty scored); Kaito Tsuchiya (penalty scored); Shuto Hatta (penalty scored); Yutaro Onda (penalty scored); Takeshi Katori (penalty scored); Shunsuke Hayashi (penalty scored); Hayato Hiratsuka (penalty scored); Issei Hirauchi (penalty scored); Noriharu Kan (penalty scored) | | (penalty scored) Abdul Hanan Sani Brown; (penalty scored) Yuta Inoue; (penalty scored) Yuma Narazaki; (penalty scored) Yuha Kabashima; (penalty scored) Shido Ikeda; (penalty scored) Ichika Maeda; (penalty scored) Rikuto Hirota; (penalty scored) Shunta Kai; (penalty missed) Takumi Koura |

| 29 July Match 54 | Nagoya Grampus | 0–2 | Gamba Osaka | Kita |
| 19:15 | | Report | Yuto Amano 45'; Shimpei Okura 80+1' | Stadium: Ajinomoto Field Nishigaoka; Attendance: 517; Referee: Kiyoto Takeuchi |

=== Final ===
31 July
18:00
Match 55

| Kawasaki Frontale | 2–3 | Gamba Osaka |
|---|---|---|
| Shotaro Shibata 24'; Takeshi Katori 29' | Report | Naru Nakatsumi 19'; Kanta Furukawa 40+2'; Takato Yamamoto 40+6' |

Ajinomoto Field Nishigaoka, Kita
Attendance: 1,223
Referee: Ryu Mashio

== Top scorers ==
| Rank | Player | Team | Goals |
|---|---|---|---|
| 1 | (Japan) Yutaro Onda | Kawasaki Frontale | 4 |
| 1 | (Japan) Ritsu Onishi | Nagoya Grampus | 4 |
| 1 | (Japan) Hiroto Tashiro | Shimizu S-Pulse | 4 |
| 1 | (Japan) Mohamad Sadiki Wade | Kashiwa Reysol | 4 |
| 1 | (Japan) Minato Yoshida | Kashima Antlers | 4 |
