= Eijiro Takeda =

Japanese footballer (born 1988)

Eijiro Takeda 武田 英二郎
Personal information
- Full name: Eijiro Takeda
- Date of birth: July 11, 1988 (age 38)
- Place of birth: Kawasaki, Japan
- Height: 1.73 m (5 ft 8 in)
- Position: Defender

Youth career
- –2000: FC Nakahara
- 2001–2006: Yokohama F. Marinos

College career
Years	Team	Apps	(Gls)
2007–2010	Aoyama Gakuin University		

Senior career*
Years	Team	Apps	(Gls)
2010	→ Shonan Bellmare (loan)	0	(0)
2011–2014	Yokohama F. Marinos	0	(0)
2012	→ JEF United Chiba (loan)	28	(0)
2013	→ Gainare Tottori (loan)	25	(1)
2014	→ Avispa Fukuoka (loan)	32	(2)
2015–2017	Shonan Bellmare	4	(0)
2018–2024	Yokohama FC	124	(2)
Total		213	(5)
- * Club domestic league appearances and goals as of 2 January 2019

Eijiro Takeda (武田 英二郎, born July 11, 1988) is a Japanese former professional football player who played as a defender.

Primarily known for his time at Yokohama FC, Takeda made over 200 career appearances. He overcame heart surgery in 2017.

== Career ==
On 13 January 2013, Takeda was announced at Gainare Tottori on a one year loan deal.

On 10 January 2014, Takeda was announced at Avispa Fukuoka on a one year loan deal.

On 11 December 2014, Takeda was announced at Shonan Bellmare on a permanent transfer. On 21 August 2017, it was announced that he had been diagnosed with exercise-induced arrhythmia, and would need to undergo heart surgery. The operation was successful, and he was able to resume his career in October, but he was released from his contract.

On 28 December 2017, Takeda was announced at Yokohama FC on a permanent transfer. On 15 September 2020, the club announced he had damage to the medial meniscus in his right knee, and would be out for one to two months. In December 2023, he participated in Shunsuke Nakamura's farewell match.

On 29 October 2024, Takeda announced he would be retiring from football at the end of the 2024 season. He played his final career match against Renofa Yamaguchi on 10 November 2024, performing well as his team won, sealing promotion to the J1 League.

== Charity work ==
Takeda is part of ROOTS, an effort to use football for children to grow, along with Kentaro Moriya, Ariajasuru Hasegawa, Masakazu Tashiro, Junpei Yamagishi and Yōsuke Saitō.

== Club statistics ==
Updated to 1 March 2019.

Club performance			League		Cup		League Cup		Other		Total	
Season	Club	League	Apps	Goals	Apps	Goals	Apps	Goals	Apps	Goals	Apps	Goals
Japan			League		Emperor's Cup		J. League Cup		Other^{1}		Total	
2010	Shonan Bellmare	J1 League	0	0	0	0	1	0	-		1	0
2011	Yokohama F. Marinos	J1 League	0	0	0	0	0	0	-		0	0
2012	JEF United Chiba	J2 League	28	0	1	0	-		-		29	0
2013	Gainare Tottori	J2 League	25	1	1	0	-		2	0	28	1
2014	Avispa Fukuoka	J2 League	32	2	0	0	-		-		32	2
2015	Shonan Bellmare	J1 League	2	0	1	0	6	1	-		9	1
2016	Shonan Bellmare	J1 League	1	0	1	0	3	0	-		5	0
2017	Shonan Bellmare	J2 League	1	0	1	0	-		-		2	0
2018	Yokohama FC	J2 League	32	1	0	0	-		-		32	1
Total			121	4	5	0	10	1	2	0	138	5

^{1}Includes J2's Relegation Playoffs.
