= Lim Dong-hyun =

South Korean footballer

Personal information
- Full name: Lim Dong-hyun
- Date of birth: June 1, 1994 (age 32)
- Place of birth: South Korea
- Height: 1.92 m (6 ft 3 1/2 in)
- Position: Defender

Senior career*
Years	Team	Apps	(Gls)
2013	Gainare Tottori	4	(0)
- * Club domestic league appearances and goals as of December 31, 2015

Lim Dong-hyun (born June 1, 1994) is a South Korean football player.

== Playing career ==
Lim Dong-hyun played for J2 League club; Gainare Tottori in 2013 season.

== Club statistics ==
Club performance			League		League Cup		Total	
Season	Club	League	Apps	Goals	Apps	Goals	Apps	Goals
Japan			League		J.League Cup		Total	
2013	Gainare Tottori	J2 League	4	0	-		4	0
Career total			4	0	0	0	4	0
