= Kohei Mihara =

Japanese footballer (born 1989)

Kohei Mihara 三原 向平
Personal information
- Full name: Kohei Mihara
- Date of birth: December 8, 1989 (age 36)
- Place of birth: Kagawa, Japan
- Height: 1.70 m (5 ft 7 in)
- Position: Defender

Team information
- Current team: Nankatsu SC
- Number: 6

Youth career
- 2005–2007: Jinsei Gakuen High School

College career
| Years | Team | Apps | (Gls) |
| 2008–2011 | Kanagawa University | | |

Senior career*
| Years | Team | Apps | (Gls) |
| 2012 | Shonan Bellmare | 6 | (0) |
| 2013–2017 | Ehime FC | 109 | (6) |
| 2018 | Vonds Ichihara | 6 | (1) |
| 2019– | Nankatsu SC | 32 | (0) |
- * Club domestic league appearances and goals as of 21:21, 3 October 2022 (UTC)

Kohei Mihara (三原 向平, Mihara Kōhei; born December 8, 1989) is a Japanese football player for Nankatsu SC.

== Career statistics ==
Updated to 23 February 2018.

Appearances and goals by club, season and competition
| Club | Season | League | | | Emperor's Cup | | Total | |
| Club | Season | Division | Apps | Goals | Apps | Goals | Apps | Goals |
|---|---|---|---|---|---|---|---|---|
| Shonan Bellmare | 2012 | J2 League | 6 | 0 | 1 | 0 | 7 | 0 |
| Ehime FC | 2013 | J2 League | 38 | 1 | 0 | 0 | 38 | 1 |
| Ehime FC | 2014 | J2 League | 24 | 1 | 1 | 0 | 25 | 1 |
| Ehime FC | 2015 | J2 League | 29 | 3 | 0 | 0 | 29 | 3 |
| Ehime FC | 2016 | J2 League | 9 | 0 | 1 | 0 | 10 | 0 |
| Ehime FC | 2017 | J2 League | 9 | 1 | 1 | 0 | 10 | 1 |
| Career total | | | 115 | 6 | 4 | 0 | 119 | 6 |
