= Yuki Hashizume =

Japanese footballer

Yuki Hashizume 橋爪勇樹
Personal information
- Full name: Yuki Hashizume
- Date of birth: 10 August 1990 (age 36)
- Place of birth: Ueda, Nagano, Japan
- Height: 1.75 m (5 ft 9 in)
- Position: Defender

Team information
- Current team: Ventforet Kofu
- Number: 28

Youth career
- 2009–2012: Yamanashi Gakuin University

Senior career*
Years	Team	Apps	(Gls)
2013–	Ventforet Kofu	81	(1)
- * Club domestic league appearances and goals as of 31 December 2018

Yuki Hashizume (橋爪 勇樹, Hashizume Yūki; born 24 August 1990) is a Japanese football player for Ventforet Kofu.

== Career statistics ==
Updated to 23 February 2018.

Appearances and goals by club, season and competition
Club	Season	League			Emperor's Cup		J.League Cup		Total	
Club	Season	Division	Apps	Goals	Apps	Goals	Apps	Goals	Apps	Goals
Ventforet Kofu	2013	J1 League	3	0	1	0	2	0	6	0
Ventforet Kofu	2014	J1 League	2	0	1	0	2	0	5	0
Ventforet Kofu	2015	J1 League	17	1	3	1	4	0	24	2
Ventforet Kofu	2016	J1 League	25	0	1	0	3	0	29	0
Ventforet Kofu	2017	J1 League	23	0	0	0	3	0	26	0
Career total			70	1	6	1	14	0	90	2
