= Sho Matsumoto =

Japanese footballer (born 1992)

Sho Matsumoto 松本 翔
Personal information
- Full name: Sho Matsumoto
- Date of birth: April 4, 1992 (age 34)
- Place of birth: Kawasaki, Kanagawa, Japan
- Height: 1.62 m (5 ft 4 in)
- Position: Midfielder

Team information
- Current team: Reilac Shiga
- Number: 11

Youth career
- 2008–2010: Yokohama F. Marinos

Senior career*
Years	Team	Apps	(Gls)
2011–2015	Yokohama F. Marinos	3	(0)
2013	→ Ehime FC (loan)	10	(1)
2015	→ Renofa Yamaguchi (loan)	10	(0)
2017	Saurcos Fukui	6	(0)
2018	Gainare Tottori	2	(0)
2019–2021	Kochi United SC		
2023–	Reilac Shiga	0	(0)
- * Club domestic league appearances and goals as of 27 January 2019

Sho Matsumoto (松本 翔, Matsumoto Shō; born April 4, 1992) is a Japanese football player who plays for Reilac Shiga.

== Career ==
Matsumoto left Gainare Tottori when his contract expired on 1 December 2018. He signed for Kochi United SC of the Shikoku Soccer League for the 2019 season.

== Club statistics ==
Updated to 23 February 2018.

Club performance			League		Cup		League Cup		Total	
Season	Club	League	Apps	Goals	Apps	Goals	Apps	Goals	Apps	Goals
Japan			League		Emperor's Cup		J.League Cup		Total	
2011	Yokohama F. Marinos	J1 League	0	0	1	0	2	0	3	0
2012	Yokohama F. Marinos	J1 League	3	0	0	0	3	1	6	1
2013	Ehime FC	J2 League	10	1	1	0	-		11	1
2014	Yokohama F. Marinos	J1 League	0	0	0	0	0	0	0	0
2015	Renofa Yamaguchi	J3 League	10	0	0	0	-		10	0
2017	Saurcos Fukui	JRL (Hokushinetsu)	6	0	0	0	-		6	0
Career total			29	1	2	0	5	1	36	2
