= Kentaro Shigematsu =

Japanese footballer

Kentaro Shigematsu 重松 健太郎
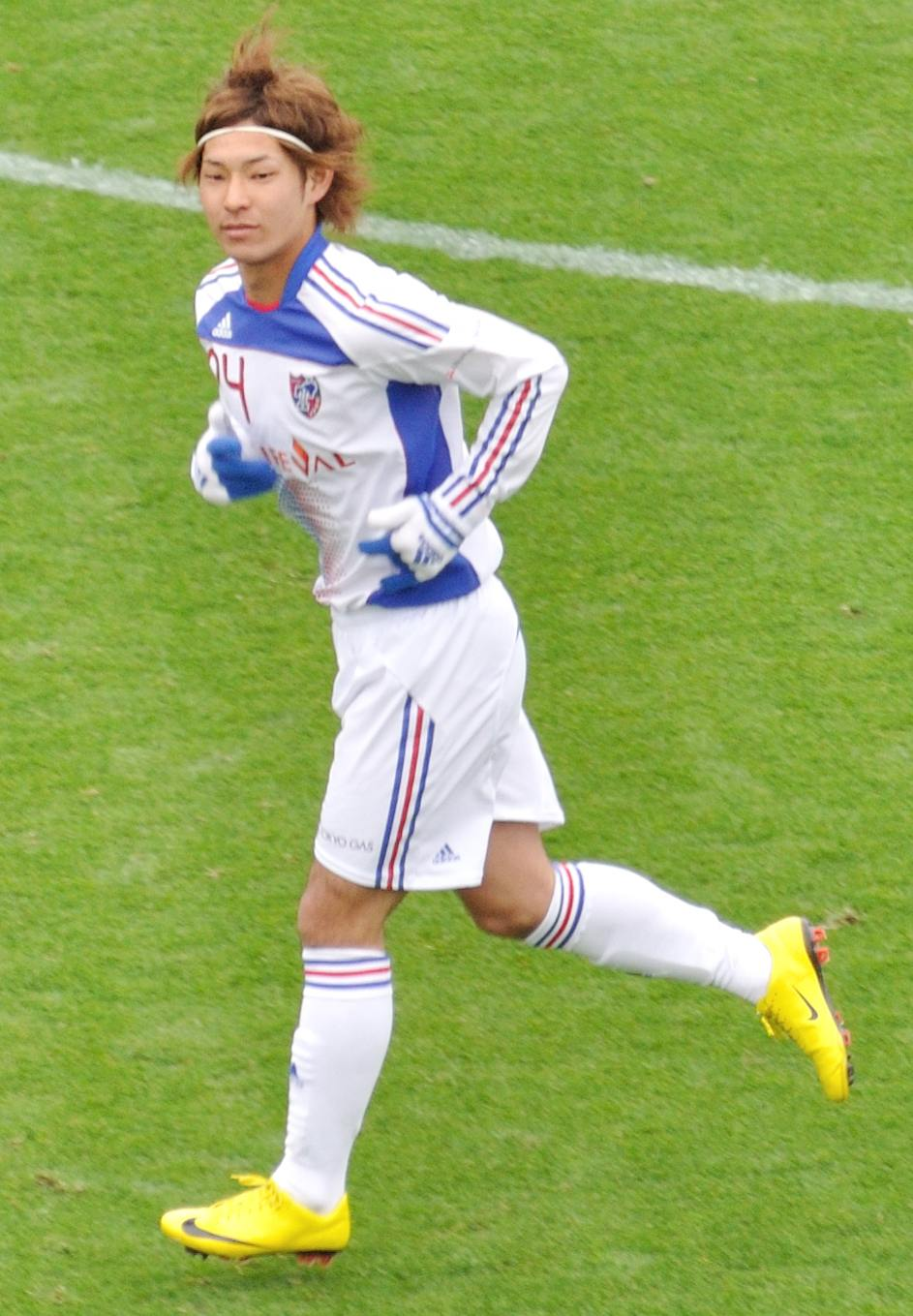

Personal information
- Full name: Kentaro Shigematsu
- Date of birth: 15 April 1991 (age 35)
- Place of birth: Nakano, Tokyo, Japan
- Height: 1.73 m (5 ft 8 in)
- Position: Striker

Team information
- Current team: FC Ryukyu
- Number: 13

Youth career
- –2003: Tsubasa SC
- 2004–2009: FC Tokyo

Senior career*
Years	Team	Apps	(Gls)
2010–2013	FC Tokyo	20	(3)
2011	→ Avispa Fukuoka (loan)	24	(2)
2012	→ Ventforet Kofu (loan)	0	(0)
2013	→ Ehime FC (loan)	25	(2)
2014	Tochigi SC	20	(1)
2015–2017	FC Machida Zelvia	95	(10)
2018–2022	Kamatamare Sanuki	142	(24)
2023	Gainare Tottori	34	(7)
2024	FC Osaka	3	(0)
2024	→ FC Ryukyu (loan)	14	(1)
2025–	FIFTY CLUB	0	(0)
- * Club domestic league appearances and goals as of 23:16, 16 June 2025 (UTC)

Kentaro Shigematsu (重松 健太郎, Shigematsu Kentarō; born 15 April 1991 in Nakano, Tokyo) is a Japanese football player who plays as a striker for FIFTY CLUB.

A journeyman striker, Shigematsu has over 375 appearances in the J League system for various teams, with the majority of his appearances coming from his time at Kamatamare Sanuki and Machida Zelvia.

== Career ==
On 29 March 2010, Shigematsu scored on his professional and J League debut against Omiya Ardija.

On 8 January 2011, Shigematsu was announced at Avispa Fukuoka on a one year loan.

On 14 July 2012, Shigematsu was announced at Ventforet Kofu on loan. He suffered a left knee injury in August 2012, which ended his season. On 26 December 2012, his loan expired and he returned to FC Tokyo. In February 2013, Shigematsu recovered from his injury.

On 7 January 2014, Shigematsu was announced at Tochigi SC on a permanent transfer.

On 25 February 2015, Shigematsu was announced at Machida Zelvia on a permanent transfer. On 26 November 2017, the club announced that he would not be extending his contract for the 2018 season.

On 23 December 2017, Shigematsu was announced at Kamatamare Sanuki on a permanent transfer. On 10 October 2021, he played his 300th J league match.

On 13 December 2022, Shigematsu was announced at Gainare Tottori on a permanent transfer. On 25 November 2023, the club announced that he would not be extending his contract for the 2024 season.

On 23 July 2024, Shigematsu was announced at FC Ryukyu on loan.

On 20 January 2025, Shigematsu was announced at FIFTY CLUB on a permanent transfer.

== Club statistics ==
Updated to 23 February 2018.

Club performance			League		Cup		League Cup		Total	
Season	Club	League	Apps	Goals	Apps	Goals	Apps	Goals	Apps	Goals
Japan			League		Emperor's Cup		League Cup		Total	
2010	FC Tokyo	J1 League	19	3	3	0	6	1	28	4
2011	Avispa Fukuoka	J1 League	25	2	2	0	2	0	29	2
2012	FC Tokyo	J1 League	1	0	-		-		1	0
2012	Ventforet Kofu	J2 League	0	0	0	0	-		0	0
2013	Ehime FC	J2 League	25	2	0	0	-		0	0
2014	Tochigi SC	J2 League	20	1	1	0	-		21	1
2015	Machida Zelvia	J3 League	36	3	2	2	-		38	5
2016	Machida Zelvia	J2 League	36	4	1	0	-		37	4
2017	Machida Zelvia	J2 League	23	3	1	0	-		24	3
Career total			184	18	10	2	8	1	202	21
