= Kim Chang-hun =

South Korean footballer (born 1990)

Kim Chang-Hun
Personal information
- Full name: Kim Chang-Hun
- Date of birth: February 17, 1990 (age 36)
- Place of birth: South Korea
- Height: 1.88 m (6 ft 2 in)
- Position: Defender

Team information
- Current team: Suwon FC

Senior career*
Years	Team	Apps	(Gls)
2012	Oita Trinita	6	(0)
2013	Ulsan Hyundai Mipo	18	(2)
2014–	Suwon FC	61	(1)
2016–2017	→ Sangju Sangmu (army)	1	(0)
- * Club domestic league appearances and goals as of 4 January 2019

- Kim Chang-hun
- Hangul: 김창훈
- Hanja: 金昶訓
- RR: Gim Changhun
- MR: Kim Ch'anghun

Kim Chang-Hun (born February 17, 1990) is a South Korean football player. He has represented South Korea at the U-22 level.

== Club statistics ==
Club performance			League		Cup		Total	
Season	Club	League	Apps	Goals	Apps	Goals	Apps	Goals
Japan			League		Emperor's Cup		Total	
2012	Oita Trinita	J2 League	6	0	1	0	7	0
Country	Japan							
Total								
