= Kentaro Moriya =

Japanese footballer (born 1988)

Kentaro Moriya 森谷 賢太郎
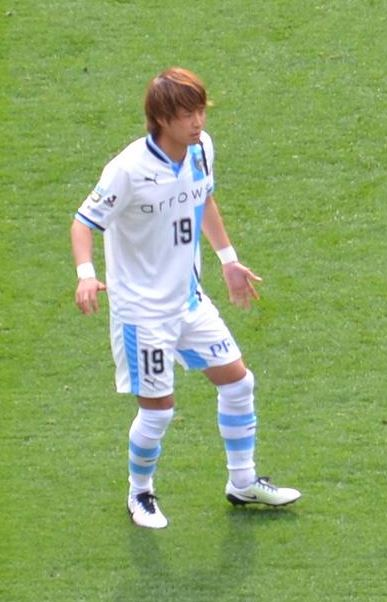
- Moriya playing for Kawasaki Frontale in April 2016

Personal information
- Date of birth: 21 September 1988 (age 38)
- Place of birth: Kōnan-ku, Yokohama, Japan
- Height: 1.73 m (5 ft 8 in)
- Position: Attacking midfielder

Youth career
- 1998–2006: Yokohama F. Marinos

College career
Years	Team	Apps	(Gls)
2007–2010	University of Tsukuba		

Senior career*
Years	Team	Apps	(Gls)
2011–2012	Yokohama F. Marinos	8	(1)
2013–2018	Kawasaki Frontale	105	(11)
2019–2020	Júbilo Iwata	9	(0)
2020	→ Ehime FC (loan)	40	(0)
2021	Ehime FC	22	(0)
2022–2024	Sagan Tosu	28	(1)
Medal record
Kawasaki Frontale
Winner	J1 League	2017
Winner	J1 League	2018
Runner-up	J.League Cup	2017
Runner-up	Emperor's Cup	2016
- * Club domestic league appearances and goals

Kentaro Moriya (森谷 賢太郎, Moriya Kentaro; born 21 September 1988) is a Japanese former footballer who played as an attacking midfielder.

== Club statistics ==
Updated to 19 July 2022.

Club performance			League		Cup		League Cup		Continental		Total	
Season	Club	League	Apps	Goals	Apps	Goals	Apps	Goals	Apps	Goals	Apps	Goals
Japan			League		Emperor's Cup		J. League Cup		AFC		Total	
2011	Yokohama F. Marinos	J1 League	4	1	3	0	0	0	–		7	1
2012	Yokohama F. Marinos	J1 League	4	0	0	0	2	0	–		6	0
2013	Kawasaki Frontale	J1 League	16	1	4	0	8	1	–		28	2
2014	Kawasaki Frontale	J1 League	27	2	0	0	4	2	6	0	37	4
2015	Kawasaki Frontale	J1 League	22	2	1	0	4	1	–		27	3
2016	Kawasaki Frontale	J1 League	19	4	4	0	4	0	–		27	4
2017	Kawasaki Frontale	J1 League	18	2	3	1	3	0	4	0	28	3
2018	Kawasaki Frontale	J1 League	3	0	2	0	0	0	4	0	9	0
2019	Júbilo Iwata	J1 League	9	0	1	1	4	0	–		14	1
2020	Ehime FC (loan)	J2 League	40	0	–		–		–		40	0
2021	Ehime FC	J2 League	22	0	1	0	–		–		23	0
2022	Sagan Tosu	J1 League	8	0	3	0	3	0	–		14	0
Total			192	12	22	2	32	4	14	0	260	18
