= Daisuke Nasu =

Japanese footballer (born 1981)

Daisuke Nasu 那須 大亮
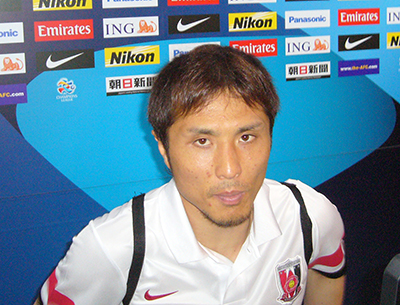
- Nasu with Urawa Red Diamonds in 2013

Personal information
- Full name: Daisuke Nasu
- Date of birth: 10 October 1981 (age 45)
- Place of birth: Minamisatsuma, Kagoshima, Japan
- Height: 1.80 m (5 ft 11 in)
- Position: Defender

Team information
- Current team: Iwate Grulla Morioka
- Number: 55

Youth career
- 1994–1996: Makurazaki Junior High School
- 1997–1999: Kagoshima Jitsugyo High School

College career
Years	Team	Apps	(Gls)
2000–2001	Komazawa University		

Senior career*
Years	Team	Apps	(Gls)
2002–2007	Yokohama F. Marinos	119	(6)
2008	Tokyo Verdy	32	(1)
2009–2011	Júbilo Iwata	100	(7)
2012	Kashiwa Reysol	23	(0)
2013–2017	Urawa Red Diamonds	117	(15)
2018–2019	Vissel Kobe	9	(0)
2023–	Iwate Grulla Morioka	0	(0)

International career
2004	Japan U-23	2	(0)
Medal record
Yokohama F. Marinos
Winner	J1 League	2003
Winner	J1 League	2004
Runner-up	J1 League	2002
Júbilo Iwata
Winner	J.League Cup	2010
Kashiwa Reysol
Winner	Emperor's Cup	2012
Urawa Reds
Winner	AFC Champions League	2017
Runner-up	J1 League	2014
Runner-up	J1 League	2016
Winner	J.League Cup	2016
Runner-up	J.League Cup	2013
Runner-up	Emperor's Cup	2015
Representing Japan
Asian Games
Silver medal – second place	2002 Busan	Team
AFC U-19 Championship
Silver medal – second place	2000 Iran
- * Club domestic league appearances and goals as of end of 2019 season

Daisuke Nasu (那須 大亮, Nasu Daisuke; born 10 October 1981) is a Japanese football player who plays for Iwate Grulla Morioka.

== Playing career ==
Nasu was born in Minamisatsuma on 10 October 1981. When he was a Komazawa University student, he joined the J1 League club Yokohama F. Marinos in 2002. Although he was originally a center back, he became a regular player as defensive midfielder under new manager Takeshi Okada from 2003 and was selected Rookie of the Year award in 2003. Marinos won the champions for two years in a row (2003 and 2004). However his opportunity to play decreased from 2006. In 2008, he moved to Tokyo Verdy. He played as regular player as his originally position, center back. However Verdy finished at the 17th place and was relegated to J2 League. In 2009, he moved to Júbilo Iwata. He played as regular player as center back in 2009 and as a defensive midfielder in 2010. Júbilo also won the champions in 2010 J.League Cup. He also played as left side back from summer 2011. In 2012, he moved to Kashiwa Reysol. Although his opportunity to play decreased, he played many matches side back and center back. Reysol also won the champions in Emperor's Cup. In 2013, he moved to Urawa Reds. He became a regular center back and scored 9 goals in 2013 season. He was also selected Best Eleven award in 2013. From 2016, his opportunity to play decreased behind new player Wataru Endo. In 2018, he moved to Vissel Kobe.

Nasu retired at the end of the 2019 season and became a YouTuber since then.

However, on 15 August 2023, it was announced that he makes his return to football by signing with J3 League side, Iwate Grulla Morioka

== National team career ==
In June 2001, Nasu was selected Japan U-20 national team for 2001 World Youth Championship. But he did not play in the match. In August 2004, he was selected Japan U-23 national team for 2004 Summer Olympics and he named a captain. He played 2 matches.

== Away from football ==
He joined SASUKE 38 at December 2020. He failed Stage 1 at Dragon Glider.

== Club statistics ==
As of end of 2018 season

Club performance			League		Cup		League Cup		Continental		Other		Total	
Season	Club	League	Apps	Goals	Apps	Goals	Apps	Goals	Apps	Goals	Apps	Goals	Apps	Goals
Japan			League		Emperor's Cup		J.League Cup		Asia		Other^{1}		Total	
2002	Yokohama F. Marinos	J1 League	3	0	1	0	0	0	–		–		4	0
2003	Yokohama F. Marinos	J1 League	29	2	3	0	6	0	–		–		38	2
2004	Yokohama F. Marinos	J1 League	24	1	1	0	3	0	3	0	–		31	1
2005	Yokohama F. Marinos	J1 League	29	2	2	0	3	1	5	1	4	0	43	4
2006	Yokohama F. Marinos	J1 League	16	1	3	0	9	1	–		–		28	2
2007	Yokohama F. Marinos	J1 League	18	0	1	0	8	0	–		–		27	0
Total			119	6	11	0	29	2	8	1	4	0	171	9
2008	Tokyo Verdy	J1 League	32	1	1	0	6	0	–		–		39	1
Total			32	1	1	0	6	0	–		–		39	1
2009	Júbilo Iwata	J1 League	34	1	3	1	6	0	–		–		43	2
2010	Júbilo Iwata	J1 League	33	3	2	0	11	0	–		–		46	3
2011	Júbilo Iwata	J1 League	33	3	1	0	5	1	–		1	0	40	4
Total			100	7	6	1	22	1	–		1	0	129	9
2012	Kashiwa Reysol	J1 League	23	0	5	0	3	0	3	1	0	0	34	1
Total			23	0	5	0	3	0	3	1	0	0	34	1
2013	Urawa Reds	J1 League	32	9	0	0	5	0	5	2	–		42	11
2014	Urawa Reds	J1 League	32	3	2	0	4	1	–		–		38	4
2015	Urawa Reds	J1 League	30	2	4	0	1	0	3	0	2	0	40	2
2016	Urawa Reds	J1 League	14	1	0	0	3	0	3	0	0	0	20	1
2017	Urawa Reds	J1 League	9	0	1	0	0	0	5	0	0	0	15	0
Total			117	15	6	0	13	1	16	2	2	0	154	18
2018	Vissel Kobe	J1 League	9	0	1	0	5	0	–		–		15	0
2019	Vissel Kobe	J1 League												
Total			9	0	1	0	5	0	–		–		15	0
Career total			400	29	30	1	79	4	27	4	7	0	543	38

^{1}Includes Japanese Super Cup, A3 Champions Cup and J.League Championship.

== National team career statistics ==
Team	Competition	Category	Appearances		Goals	Team record
Team	Competition	Category	Start	Sub	Goals	Team record
Japan	2004 Summer Olympics	U-23	1	1	0	Round 1

== Honours ==
=== Club ===
Yokohama F. Marinos

- J1 League (2) : 2003, 2004

Júbilo Iwata

- J.League Cup (1) : 2010
- Suruga Bank Championship (1) : 2011

Kashiwa Reysol

- Emperor's Cup (1) : 2012
- Japanese Super Cup (1) : 2012

Urawa Red Diamonds

- J.League Cup (1) : 2016
- AFC Champions League (1): 2017

=== Individual ===
- J.League Rookie of the Year : 2003
