= Shinzō Kōroki =

Japanese footballer (born 1986)

Shinzō Kōroki 興梠 慎三
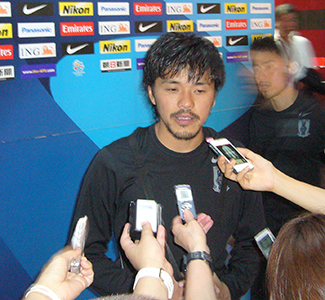
- Koroki in 2013

Personal information
- Full name: Shinzō Kōroki
- Date of birth: 31 July 1986 (age 40)
- Place of birth: Miyazaki, Miyazaki, Japan
- Height: 1.75 m (5 ft 9 in)
- Position: Striker

Team information
- Current team: Urawa Red Diamonds
- Number: 30

Youth career
- 2002–2004: Hosho High School

Senior career*
Years	Team	Apps	(Gls)
2005–2012	Kashima Antlers	192	(49)
2013–2024	Urawa Red Diamonds	313	(114)
2022	→ Hokkaido Consadole Sapporo (loan)	21	(5)

International career
2016	Japan Olympic (O.P.)	3	(1)
2008–2015	Japan	16	(0)
Medal record
Kashima Antlers
Winner	J1 League	2007
Winner	J1 League	2008
Winner	J1 League	2009
Winner	J.League Cup	2011
Winner	J.League Cup	2012
Runner-up	J.League Cup	2006
Winner	Emperor's Cup	2007
Winner	Emperor's Cup	2010
Urawa Reds
Winner	AFC Champions League	2017 and 2022
Runner-up	J1 League	2014
Runner-up	J1 League	2016
Winner	J.League Cup	2016
Runner-up	J.League Cup	2013
Winner	Emperor's Cup	2018 and 2021
Runner-up	Emperor's Cup	2015
- * Club domestic league appearances and goals as of 8 December 2024, 20:08 (UTC)

Shinzō Kōroki (興梠 慎三, Kōroki Shinzō; born 31 July 1986) is a Japanese former footballer who plays as a striker. He has played for the Japan national team until 2015. Currently is a pundit of the J1 League matches.

== Club career ==
In 2023, Kōroki would return to Urawa Red Diamonds after his loan contract expired at Hokkaido Consadole Sapporo in 2022.

Kōroki announce his retirement on 21 November 2024.

== International career ==
Kōroki made his Japan national team debut on 9 October 2008 in a friendly match against United Arab Emirates.

In August 2016, Kōroki was selected Japan U-23 national team as overage player for 2016 Summer Olympics. At this tournament, he played all 3 matches and scored a goal against Nigeria.

== Managerial career ==
In 2025, Shinzō Kōroki announce official appointment of Academy Role Model Coach, Partner Sales Department in Urawa Red Diamonds.

== Career statistics ==
=== Club ===
As of the end 2024 season.

Appearances and goals by club, season and competition
Club	Season	League			Emperor's Cup		J.League Cup		AFC		Other^{1}		Total	
Club	Season	Division	Apps	Goals	Apps	Goals	Apps	Goals	Apps	Goals	Apps	Goals	Apps	Goals
Kashima Antlers	2005	J.League Div 1	8	0	0	0	4	1	–		–		12	1
Kashima Antlers	2006	J.League Div 1	10	0	2	0	10	0	–		–		22	0
Kashima Antlers	2007	J.League Div 1	22	6	3	0	7	0	–		–		32	6
Kashima Antlers	2008	J.League Div 1	29	8	2	0	2	0	7	2	–		40	10
Kashima Antlers	2009	J.League Div 1	32	12	3	1	2	0	6	3	1	1	44	17
Kashima Antlers	2010	J.League Div 1	30	8	5	2	2	1	7	2	1	0	45	13
Kashima Antlers	2011	J.League Div 1	31	4	3	1	3	1	6	3	1	0	44	9
Kashima Antlers	2012	J.League Div 1	30	11	5	1	8	3	–		1	0	44	15
Kashima Antlers	Total		192	49	23	5	38	6	26	10	4	1	283	71
Urawa Red Diamonds	2013	J.League Div 1	33	13	0	0	4	5	5	1	–		42	19
Urawa Red Diamonds	2014	J.League Div 1	31	12	1	2	5	0	–		–		37	14
Urawa Red Diamonds	2015	J1 League	26	12	4	3	0	0	2	1	–		32	16
Urawa Red Diamonds	2016	J1 League	30	14	1	1	5	3	8	2	2	1	46	21
Urawa Red Diamonds	2017	J1 League	33	20	1	0	1	1	12	4	3	1	48	26
Urawa Red Diamonds	2018	J1 League	33	15	6	1	3	4	–		–		42	20
Urawa Red Diamonds	2019	J1 League	31	12	0	0	2	1	14	8	1	0	48	21
Urawa Red Diamonds	2020	J1 League	30	10	–		0	0	–				30	10
Urawa Red Diamonds	2021	J1 League	20	1	3	0	7	1	–		–		30	2
Urawa Red Diamonds	2023	J1 League	29	4	2	0	5	0	4	0	1	0	41	4
Urawa Red Diamonds	2024	J1 League	17	1	0	0	2	0	–				19	1
Urawa Red Diamonds	Total		313	114	18	7	36	15	48	17	7	2	412	155
Hokkaido Consadole Sapporo (loan)	2022	J1 League	21	5	1	0	–						22	5
Career total			526	168	42	12	74	21	74	27	11	3	727	231

^{1}Includes Japanese Super Cup, J.League Championship and Suruga Bank Championship and Club World Cup

=== National team ===
Japan national team
Year	Apps	Goals
2008	2	0
2009	8	0
2010	1	0
2011	1	0
2012	0	0
2013	0	0
2014	0	0
2015	4	0
Total	16	0

=== Appearances in major competitions ===
Team	Competition	Category	Appearances		Goals	Team Record
Team	Competition	Category	Start	Sub	Goals	Team Record
Japan	2010 FIFA World Cup qualification	Senior	0	2	0	Qualified
Japan	2011 AFC Asian Cup qualification	Senior	1	1	0	Qualified

== Honours ==
Kashima Antlers

- J1 League: 2007, 2008, 2009
- Emperor's Cup: 2007, 2010
- J.League Cup: 2011
- Japanese Super Cup: 2009, 2010
- Suruga Bank Championship: 2012

Urawa Red Diamonds

- Emperor's Cup: 2018
- J.League Cup: 2016
- AFC Champions League: 2017, 2022
- AFC Champions League runner-up: 2019
- Suruga Bank Championship: 2017

Individual

- J.League Best XI: 2017
