= Yuki Abe =

Japanese footballer (born 1981)

Yuki Abe 阿部 勇樹
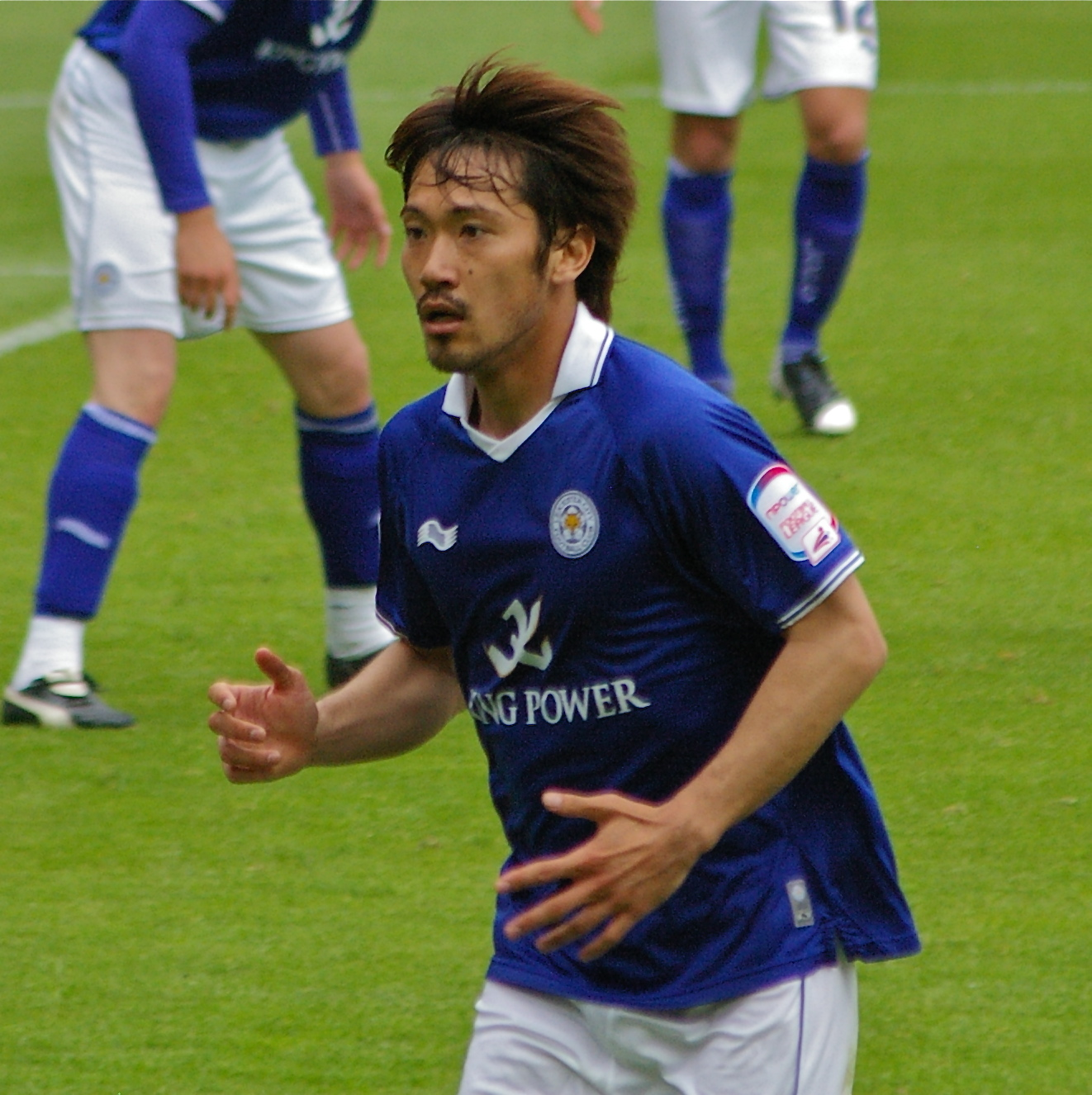
- Abe playing for Leicester City in 2011

Personal information
- Full name: Yuki Abe
- Date of birth: 6 September 1981 (age 45)
- Place of birth: Ichikawa, Chiba, Japan
- Height: 1.78 m (5 ft 10 in)
- Position: Defensive midfielder

Youth career
- –1987: Fumihama FC
- 1988–1993: Ichikawa FC
- 1994–1999: JEF United Ichihara

Senior career*
Years	Team	Apps	(Gls)
1998–2006	JEF United Chiba	214	(36)
2007–2010	Urawa Red Diamonds	120	(14)
2010–2012	Leicester City	52	(2)
2012–2022	Urawa Red Diamonds	256	(25)
Total		642	(77)

International career
2000	Japan U-20	2	(2)
2002–2004	Japan U-23	13	(3)
2005–2011	Japan	53	(3)
Medal record
JEF United Chiba
Winner	J.League Cup	2005
Winner	J.League Cup	2006
Runner-up	J.League Cup	1998
Urawa Reds
Winner	AFC Champions League	2007
Winner	AFC Champions League	2017
Runner-up	J1 League	2007
Runner-up	J1 League	2014
Runner-up	J1 League	2016
Winner	J.League Cup	2016
Runner-up	J.League Cup	2013
Winner	Emperor's Cup	2018
Runner-up	Emperor's Cup	2015
Representing Japan
Asian Games
Silver medal – second place	2002 Busan	Team
- * Club domestic league appearances and goals

Yuki Abe (阿部 勇樹, Abe Yūki; born 6 September 1981) is a Japanese former professional footballer who played as a defensive midfielder. He played 53 times for Japan between 2005 and 2011 and was a member of the 2010 FIFA World Cup squad.

== Club career ==
=== JEF United Chiba ===
Born in Ichikawa, Chiba, Abe, then a member of the JEF United Ichihara (now JEF United Chiba) youth side, made his debut with the senior club at the age of 16 years and 333 days on 5 August 1998, at the time a record for the youngest Japanese professional player and J1 League. He went on to become JEF United's captain, and led the club to the 2005 and 2006 J.League Cup titles while being named to the league's Best Eleven during the span.

=== Urawa Reds ===
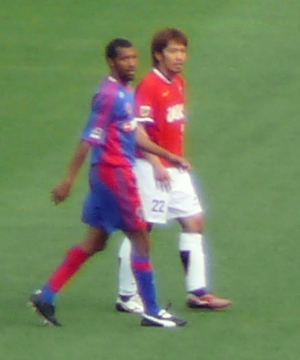
Abe (right) playing for Urawa Reds in 2007

On 22 January 2007, Abe joined Urawa Reds, the defending J1 League and Emperor's Cup champions, for a transfer fee of around ¥360 million (around $3 million), a record amount for a Japanese player in a domestic deal.

Abe helped Urawa Reds to win the 2007 AFC Champions League. He scored once in the second leg of the final against Iran's Sepahan FC. Abe participated in the 2007 Club World Cup playing for Urawa who eventually lost to AC Milan. Urawa finished in third place.

=== Leicester City ===
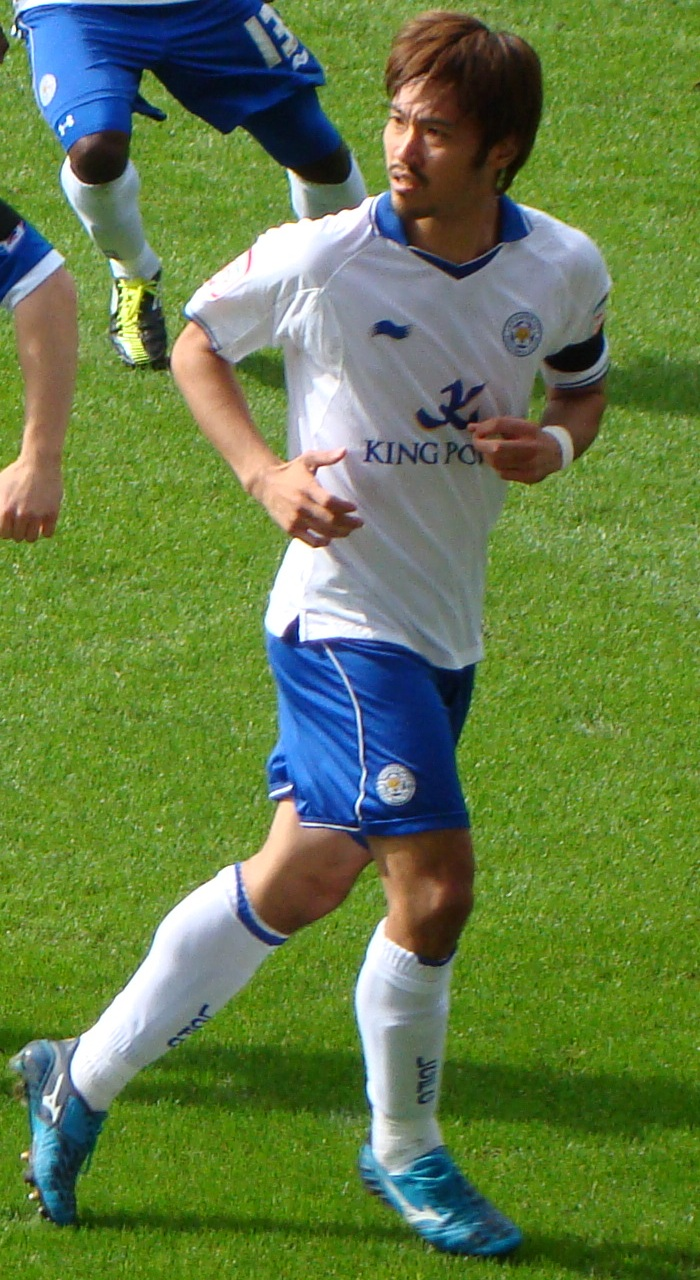
Abe in his final season with Leicester City on 25 September 2011

On 26 August 2010, Abe was signed by English Championship club Leicester City, signing a three-year contract. He made his debut in a 2-1 league win over Cardiff City on 14 September, scoring his first goal for the club in a 4–2 win over Ipswich Town on 7 May 2011. His last league goal for the club was in a 1–0 win over Brighton on 17 September 2011. Suffering from homesickness, Abe's contract was cancelled by mutual consent on 22 January 2012 and he returned to Japan to re-join former club Urawa Reds.

=== Urawa Reds ===
In 2012, Abe returned to Urawa Reds. He played all matches in J1 League except for one match in 2013 season until 2016 season. In 2016, Reds won the champions in J.League Cup and the 2nd place in J1 League. He was also selected Best Eleven award. In 2017, Reds won the champions in AFC Champions League for the first time in 10 years. In 2018, Reds won the Emperor's Cup.

On 14 November 2021, Abe announced that he would retire from football at the end of the 2021 season.

== International career ==
Abe made his senior national team debut on 29 January 2005, in a friendly match against Kazakhstan and scored his first national team goal on 6 September 2006 against Yemen in a 2007 Asian Cup qualification match. He was not selected to Japan's 2006 World Cup team, but he has become a regular under his former JEF United coach Ivica Osim, who took over as the national team head coach after the World Cup. He had previously represented Japan at the Under-20 and Under-23 levels, appearing in all three first round matches at the 2004 Olympics and scoring a goal against Italy. He appeared in all of Japan's games at the 2010 World Cup. Despite missing out on Japan's 2011 Asian Cup victory, on 29 March 2011 he played 45 minutes against the J-League All Stars. On 4 August 2011 Abe was announced in the Japan squad to play South Korea. He played 53 games and scored 3 goals for Japan until 2011.

== Career statistics ==
=== Club ===
Appearances and goals by club, season and competition
Club	Season	League			National cup (Note: Includes Emperor's Cup and FA Cup.)		League cup (Note: Includes J.League Cup and Football League Cup.)		Continental (Note: Includes AFC Champions League.)		Other (Note: Includes Japanese Super Cup, A3 Champions Cup, Suruga Bank Championship, J.League Championship and FIFA Club World Cup.)		Total	
Club	Season	Division	Apps	Goals	Apps	Goals	Apps	Goals	Apps	Goals	Apps	Goals	Apps	Goals
JEF United Ichihara	1998	J1 League	1	0	0	0	0	0	–		–		1	0
JEF United Ichihara	1999	J1 League	30	1	1	0	2	0	–		–		33	1
JEF United Ichihara	2000	J1 League	25	0	3	2	3	0	–		–		31	2
JEF United Ichihara	2001	J1 League	17	3	2	0	2	0	–		–		21	3
JEF United Ichihara	2002	J1 League	24	1	2	0	3	0	–		–		29	1
JEF United Ichihara	2003	J1 League	27	3	4	0	3	0	–		–		34	3
JEF United Ichihara	2004	J1 League	24	5	1	0	5	1	–		–		30	6
JEF United Chiba	2005	J1 League	33	12	1	0	10	5	–		–		44	17
JEF United Chiba	2006	J1 League	33	11	1	0	8	2	–		3	1	45	14
JEF United Chiba	Total		214	36	15	2	36	8	–		3	1	268	47
Urawa Reds	2007	J1 League	33	3	1	0	0	0	12	3	6	0	52	6
Urawa Reds	2008	J1 League	33	6	1	0	1	0	4	0	–		39	6
Urawa Reds	2009	J1 League	34	2	0	0	4	0	–		–		38	2
Urawa Reds	2010	J1 League	20	3	0	0	2	1	–		–		22	4
Urawa Reds	Total		120	14	2	0	7	1	16	3	6	0	151	18
Leicester City	2010/11	Championship	36	1	2	0	2	0	–		–		40	1
Leicester City	2011/12	Championship	16	1	1	0	2	0	–		–		19	1
Leicester City	Total		52	2	3	0	4	0	–		–		59	2
Urawa Reds	2012	J1 League	34	4	3	0	4	0	–		–		41	4
Urawa Reds	2013	J1 League	33	6	0	0	5	0	6	1	–		44	7
Urawa Reds	2014	J1 League	34	4	1	1	7	1	–		–		42	6
Urawa Reds	2015	J1 League	34	3	4	1	2	2	5	0	2	0	47	7
Urawa Reds	2016	J1 League	34	1	1	0	4	1	6	0	–		47	3
Urawa Reds	2017	J1 League	33	3	0	0	1	0	11	0	4	1	39	3
Urawa Reds	2018	J1 League	27	1	5	0	5	0	–		–		37	1
Urawa Reds	2019	J1 League	11	0	1	0	1	0	6	0	1	0	20	0
Urawa Reds	2020	J1 League	3	0	0	0	0	0	0	0	0	0	3	0
Urawa Reds	2021	J1 League	9	3	0	0	4	0	0	0	0	0	13	3
Urawa Reds	Total		252	25	15	2	33	4	34	1	1	1	341	33
Career total			638	77	35	4	80	13	50	4	16	2	819	100

=== International ===
Appearances and goals by national team and year
National team	Year	Apps	Goals
Japan	2005	5	0
Japan	2006	8	1
Japan	2007	11	1
Japan	2008	9	0
Japan	2009	8	1
Japan	2010	9	0
Japan	2011	3	0
Total		53	3

Scores and results list Japan's goal tally first, score column indicates score after each Abe goal.

List of international goals scored by Yuki Abe
No.	Date	Venue	Opponent	Score	Result	Competition
1	16 August 2006	Niigata Stadium, Niigata, Japan	Yemen		2–0	2007 AFC Asian Cup qualification
2	25 July 2007	Mỹ Đình National Stadium, Hanoi, Vietnam	Saudi Arabia		2–3	2007 AFC Asian Cup Semifinals
3	27 May 2009	Nagai Stadium, Osaka, Japan	Chile		4–0	Kirin Cup 2009

== Honours ==
JEF United Chiba

- J.League Cup: 2005, 2006

Urawa Red Diamonds

- AFC Champions League: 2007, 2017
- J.League Cup: 2016
- Suruga Bank Championship: 2017
- Emperor's Cup: 2018

Individual

- J.League Best Eleven: 2005, 2006, 2007, 2016
- J.League Cup New Hero Award: 2005
