= 2018 Urawa Red Diamonds season =

Urawa Red Diamonds
2018 season
- Manager: Takafumi Hori; Tsuyoshi Otsuki; Oswaldo de Oliveira
- Stadium: Saitama Stadium 2002
- J1 League: 5th
- Emperor's Cup: Champions
- YBC Levain Cup: Play-off stage
- Top goalscorer: League: Shinzo Koroki (15); All: Shinzo Koroki (20)
- Highest home attendance: 55,689 vs. Vissel Kobe
- Average home league attendance: 35,502（J1）
Home colours	Away colours

2018 Urawa Red Diamonds season.

== Squad ==
As of 17 January 2018. Note: Flags indicate national team as defined under FIFA eligibility rules; some limited exceptions apply. Players may hold more than one non-FIFA nationality.

No.	Pos.	Nation	Player
1	GK	JPN	Shusaku Nishikawa
2	DF	BRA	Maurício Antônio
3	MF	JPN	Tomoya Ugajin
5	DF	JPN	Tomoaki Makino
6	DF	JPN	Wataru Endo
7	MF	JPN	Kosuke Taketomi
9	FW	JPN	Yuki Muto
10	MF	JPN	Yōsuke Kashiwagi (captain)
11	MF	CUW	Quenten Martinus
14	MF	JPN	Tadaaki Hirakawa
15	MF	JPN	Kazuki Nagasawa
16	MF	JPN	Takuya Aoki
18	MF	JPN	Naoki Yamada
19	FW	AUS	Andrew Nabbout

No.	Pos.	Nation	Player
20	FW	JPN	Tadanari Lee
21	FW	SVN	Zlatan Ljubijankić
22	MF	JPN	Yuki Abe
23	GK	JPN	Nao Iwadate
25	GK	JPN	Tetsuya Enomoto
26	DF	JPN	Takuya Ogiwara
27	DF	JPN	Daiki Hashioka
28	GK	JPN	Haruki Fukushima
29	MF	JPN	Kai Shibato
30	FW	JPN	Shinzo Koroki
31	DF	JPN	Takuya Iwanami
38	MF	JPN	Daisuke Kikuchi
46	DF	JPN	Ryota Moriwaki

=== Out on loan ===
Note: Flags indicate national team as defined under FIFA eligibility rules; some limited exceptions apply. Players may hold more than one non-FIFA nationality.

No.	Pos.	Nation	Player
—	DF	JPN	Rikiya Motegi (at Montedio Yamagata)
—	DF	JPN	Takuya Okamoto (at Shonan Bellmare)
—	MF	JPN	Ryotaro Ito (at Mito Hollyhock)

No.	Pos.	Nation	Player
—	MF	JPN	Haruki Izawa (at Tokushima Vortis)
—	MF	JPN	Yoshiaki Komai (at Consadole Sapporo)
—	FW	JPN	Ado Onaiwu (at Renofa Yamaguchi)

== J1 League ==
Match	Date	Team	Score	Team	Venue	Attendance
1	2018.02.24	FC Tokyo	1-1	Urawa Reds	Ajinomoto Stadium	35,951
2	2018.03.04	Urawa Reds	1-2	Sanfrecce Hiroshima	Saitama Stadium 2002	41,324
3	2018.03.10	V-Varen Nagasaki	1-1	Urawa Reds	Transcosmos Stadium Nagasaki	15,975
4	2018.03.18	Urawa Reds	0-1	Yokohama F. Marinos	Saitama Stadium 2002	33,168
5	2018.04.01	Júbilo Iwata	2-1	Urawa Reds	Shizuoka Stadium	21,755
6	2018.04.07	Urawa Reds	1-0	Vegalta Sendai	Saitama Stadium 2002	28,984
7	2018.04.11	Vissel Kobe	2-3	Urawa Reds	Noevir Stadium Kobe	9,758
8	2018.04.15	Urawa Reds	2-1	Shimizu S-Pulse	Saitama Stadium 2002	28,295
9	2018.04.21	Urawa Reds	0-0	Hokkaido Consadole Sapporo	Saitama Stadium 2002	39,091
10	2018.04.25	Kashiwa Reysol	1-0	Urawa Reds	Sankyo Frontier Kashiwa Stadium	11,257
11	2018.04.28	Urawa Reds	0-1	Shonan Bellmare	Saitama Stadium 2002	33,132
12	2018.05.02	Kawasaki Frontale	0-2	Urawa Reds	Kawasaki Todoroki Stadium	22,817
13	2018.05.05	Kashima Antlers	1-0	Urawa Reds	Kashima Soccer Stadium	33,647
14	2018.05.13	Urawa Reds	0-0	Sagan Tosu	Saitama Stadium 2002	40,137
15	2018.05.19	Gamba Osaka	0-0	Urawa Reds	Panasonic Stadium Suita	25,361
16	2018.07.18	Urawa Reds	3-1	Nagoya Grampus	Saitama Stadium 2002	21,250
17	2018.07.22	Cerezo Osaka	1-1	Urawa Reds	Yanmar Stadium Nagai	27,915
18	2018.07.28	Sanfrecce Hiroshima	1-4	Urawa Reds	Edion Stadium Hiroshima	16,944
19	2018.08.01	Urawa Reds	2-0	Kawasaki Frontale	Saitama Stadium 2002	28,215
20	2018.08.05	Urawa Reds	0-0	V-Varen Nagasaki	Saitama Stadium 2002	29,051
21	2018.08.11	Sagan Tosu	1-0	Urawa Reds	Best Amenity Stadium	19,681
22	2018.08.15	Urawa Reds	4-0	Júbilo Iwata	Saitama Stadium 2002	33,824
23	2018.08.19	Shimizu S-Pulse	3-3	Urawa Reds	IAI Stadium Nihondaira	14,914
24	2018.08.26	Nagoya Grampus	4-1	Urawa Reds	Toyota Stadium	26,410
25	2018.09.01	Urawa Reds	1-2	Cerezo Osaka	Saitama Stadium 2002	27,337
26	2018.09.16	Yokohama F. Marinos	1-2	Urawa Reds	Nissan Stadium	41,686
27	2018.09.23	Urawa Reds	4-0	Vissel Kobe	Saitama Stadium 2002	55,689
28	2018.09.30	Urawa Reds	3-2	Kashiwa Reysol	Saitama Stadium 2002	26,431
29	2018.10.07	Vegalta Sendai	1-1	Urawa Reds	Yurtec Stadium Sendai	18,276
30	2018.10.20	Urawa Reds	3-1	Kashima Antlers	Saitama Stadium 2002	46,893
31	2018.11.03	Urawa Reds	1-3	Gamba Osaka	Saitama Stadium 2002	43,943
32	2018.11.10	Hokkaido Consadole Sapporo	1-2	Urawa Reds	Sapporo Atsubetsu Stadium	12,723
33	2018.11.24	Shonan Bellmare	2-1	Urawa Reds	Shonan BMW Stadium Hiratsuka	14,711
34	2018.12.01	Urawa Reds	3-2	FC Tokyo	Saitama Stadium 2002	46,770

== Emperor's Cup ==
Match	Date	Team	Score	Team	Venue	Attendance
2R	2018.06.06	Urawa Reds	3-0	YSCC Yokohama	Urawa Komaba Stadium	4,276
3R	2018.07.11	Matsumoto Yamaga	1-2	Urawa Reds	Matsumotodaira Park Stadium	12,077
4R	2018.08.22	Urawa Reds	1-0	Tokyo Verdy	Kumagaya Athletic Stadium	6,458
QF	2018.10.24	Urawa Reds	2-0	Sagan Tosu	Kumagaya Athletic Stadium	7,867
SF	2018.12.05	Kashima Antlers	0-1	Urawa Reds	Kashima Soccer Stadium	13,949
F	2018.12.09	Urawa Reds	1-0	Vegalta Sendai	Saitama Stadium 2002	50,978

== J.League Cup ==
Match	Date	Team	Score	Team	Venue	Attendance
1	2018.03.07	Nagoya Grampus	1-4	Urawa Reds	Ajinomoto Stadium	9,491
2	2018.03.14	Urawa Reds	1-4	Gamba Osaka	Saitama Stadium 2002	21,897
3	2018.04.04	Sanfrecce Hiroshima	0-0	Urawa Reds	Edion Stadium Hiroshima	8,697
4	2018.04.18	Gamba Osaka	0-1	Urawa Reds	Panasonic Stadium Suita	9,516
5	2018.05.09	Urawa Reds	2-0	Nagoya Grampus	Saitama Stadium 2002	15,960
6	2018.05.16	Urawa Reds	1-0	Sanfrecce Hiroshima	Saitama Stadium 2002	17,530
PS	2018.06.02	Ventforet Kofu	2-0	Urawa Reds	Yamanashi Chuo Bank Stadium	10,337
PS	2018.06.09	Urawa Reds	2-1	Ventforet Kofu	Saitama Stadium 2002	22,664
