= 2020 Urawa Red Diamonds season =

Urawa Red Diamonds
2020 season
- Chairman: Keizo Fuchita
- Manager: Tsuyoshi Otsuki
- Stadium: Saitama Stadium 2002
- J1 League: 10th
- Emperor's Cup: Not Qualified
- J. League Cup: Group stage
- Top goalscorer: League: Leonardo (11); All: Leonardo (13)
Home colours	Away colours	Third colours

The 2020 season was Urawa Red Diamonds's 20th consecutive season in J1 League, after finishing 14th in the 2019 J1 League. The club also competed in the J.League Cup.

== Squad ==
As of 18 February 2020. Note: Flags indicate national team as defined under FIFA eligibility rules; some limited exceptions apply. Players may hold more than one non-FIFA nationality.

No.	Pos.	Nation	Player
1	GK	(Japan) JPN	Shusaku Nishikawa
2	DF	(Brazil) BRA	Maurício Antônio
3	MF	(Japan) JPN	Tomoya Ugajin
4	DF	(Japan) JPN	Daisuke Suzuki
5	DF	(Japan) JPN	Tomoaki Makino (Vice-captain)
6	DF	(Japan) JPN	Ryosuke Yamanaka
7	MF	(Japan) JPN	Kazuki Nagasawa
8	MF	(Brazil) BRA	Ewerton (on loan from Porto)
9	FW	(Japan) JPN	Yuki Muto
10	MF	(Japan) JPN	Yōsuke Kashiwagi (Captain)
11	FW	(Curaçao) CUW	Quenten Martinus
12	FW	(Brazil) BRA	Fabrício
13	MF	(Japan) JPN	Ryotaro Ito
14	FW	(Japan) JPN	Kenyu Sugimoto
16	MF	(Japan) JPN	Takuya Aoki

No.	Pos.	Nation	Player
20	DF	(Australia) AUS	Thomas Deng
22	MF	(Japan) JPN	Yuki Abe
24	MF	(Japan) JPN	Koya Yuruki
25	GK	(Japan) JPN	Haruki Fukushima
26	DF	(Japan) JPN	Takuya Ogiwara
27	DF	(Japan) JPN	Daiki Hashioka
28	DF	(Japan) JPN	Katsuya Iwatake
29	MF	(Japan) JPN	Kai Shibato
30	FW	(Japan) JPN	Shinzo Koroki (Vice-captain)
31	DF	(Japan) JPN	Takuya Iwanami
32	GK	(Japan) JPN	Ryo Ishii
37	MF	(Japan) JPN	Hidetoshi Takeda
39	MF	(Japan) JPN	Kosuke Taketomi
41	MF	(Japan) JPN	Takahiro Sekine
45	FW	(Brazil) BRA	Leonardo

== Competitions ==
=== J1 League ===
==== League table ====
Pos	Team	Pld	W	D	L	GF	GA	GD	Pts
8	Sanfrecce Hiroshima	34	13	9	12	46	37	+9	48
9	Yokohama F. Marinos	34	14	5	15	69	59	+10	47
10	Urawa Red Diamonds	34	13	7	14	43	56	−13	46
11	Oita Trinita	34	11	10	13	36	45	−9	43
12	Hokkaido Consadole Sapporo	34	10	9	15	47	58	−11	39

Source: Meiji Yasuda J1 League
Rules for classification: 1) Points; 2) Goal difference; 3) Head-to-head points; 4) Head-to-head goal difference; 5) Head-to-head goal scored; 6) Number of wins; 7) Goals scored; 8) Fair-play points.

==== Results summary ====
Overall								Home						Away					
Pld	W	D	L	GF	GA	GD	Pts	W	D	L	GF	GA	GD	W	D	L	GF	GA	GD
12	6	2	4	16	19	−3	20	2	2	2	4	7	−3	4	0	2	12	12	0

Last updated: 23 August 2020.
Source: see below

==== Results by matchday ====
Round	1	2	3	4	5	6	7	8	9	10	11	12	13	14	15	16	17	18	19	20	21	22	23	24	25	26	27	28	29	30	31	32	33	34
Ground	A	H	A	H	A	H	A	H	A	H	A	H																						
Result	W	D	W	W	L	L	W	D	L	W	W	L																						
Position	4	4	3	2	6	6	6	7	7	6	4	7																						

Updated to match(es) played on 23 August 2020. Source: See Below
A = Away; H = Home; W = Win; D = Draw; L = Loss

==== Matches ====
21 February 2020 1	Shonan Bellmare	2–3	Urawa Red Diamonds	Hiratsuka
19:03 JST	Ishihara 7'; Yamada 65' (yellow card) 78'	Report	Koroki 39'; Leonardo 42'; Sekine (yellow card) 66'	Stadium: Shonan BMW Stadium Hiratsuka; Attendance: 13,071; Referee: Ryuji Sato

4 July 2020 2	Urawa Red Diamonds	0–0	Yokohama F. Marinos	Midori-ku, Saitama
19:05 JST		Report		Stadium: Saitama Stadium 2002; Attendance: 0 Referee: Yuichi Nishimura

8 July 2020 3	Vegalta Sendai	1–2	Urawa Red Diamonds	Sendai
18:03 JST	Yamada 49'	Report	Kai Shibato (yellow card) 6'; Leonardo 45+1'; Koroki 83'	Stadium: Yurtec Stadium Sendai; Attendance: 0 Referee: Yuichi Nishimura

12 July 2020 4	Urawa Red Diamonds	1–0	Kashima Antlers	Midori-ku, Saitama
19:04 JST	Ewerton (yellow card) 15' (goal) 52'; Shibato (yellow card) 77'; Sekine (yellow card) 81'	Report	Nagaki (yellow card) 34'; Machida (yellow card) 48'	Stadium: Saitama Stadium 2002; Attendance: 3,094; Referee: Hiroyuki Kimura

18 July 2020 5	FC Tokyo	2–0	Urawa Red Diamonds	Chōfu, Tokyo
19:03 JST	Diego Oliveira 45'; Adaílton 66'; Nakamura (yellow card) 87'	Report	Leonardo (yellow card) 74'; Sekine (yellow card) 90+2'	Stadium: Ajinomoto Stadium; Attendance: 4,705; Referee: Yusuke Araki

22 July 2020 6	Urawa Red Diamonds	0–4	Kashiwa Reysol	Midori-ku, Saitama
19:33 JST	Ito (yellow card) 64'	Report	Richardson (yellow card) 27' (goal) 32'; Olunga 51'; Nakama 56'; Segawa (yellow card) 83'; Kamiya 89'	Stadium: Saitama Stadium 2002; Attendance: 4,127; Referee: Jumpei Iida

26 July 2020 7	Yokohama	0–2	Urawa Red Diamonds	Kanagawa-ku, Yokohama
18:03 JST	Leonardo 52'; Ewerton 90+3'	Report		Stadium: NHK Spring Mitsuzawa Football Stadium; Attendance: 2,580; Referee: Takuto Okabe

23 August 2020 12	Urawa Red Diamonds	1–2	Vissel Kobe	Midori-ku, Saitama
19:03 JST	Deng 33'; Nishikawa (yellow card) 53'; Leonardo (yellow card) 90+6'	Report	Ogawa 15'; Yamaguchi 82'; Dankler (yellow card) 90+3'	Stadium: Saitama Stadium 2002; Attendance: 4,435; Referee: Yuichi Nishimura

=== Group stage ===
Pos	Team	Pld	W	D	L	GF	GA	GD	Pts	CER	RED	VEG	YAM
1	Cerezo Osaka	3	3	0	0	8	1	+7	9	—	1–0	—	4–1
2	Urawa Red Diamonds	2	1	0	1	5	3	+2	6 (Note: Matsumoto Yamaga F.C. was not participate in the 2nd and 3rd sections due to a change in regulations, and the 2 matches were a 0 - goal victory for the opposing team.)	—	—	5–2	RED Wins with 0 goal
3	Vegalta Sendai	2	0	0	2	2	8	−6	3	0–3	—	—	VEG Wins with 0 goal
4	Matsumoto Yamaga F.C.	1	0	0	1	1	4	−3	0	—	—	—	—

Updated to match(es) played on 12 August 2020. Source: League table, match result

== Statistics ==
=== Goal scorers ===
Rank	No.	Pos.	Player	J.League	Emperor's Cup	J.League Cup	Total
1	45	FW	(Brazil) Leonardo	8	0	2	10
2	8	MF	(Brazil) Ewerton	2	0	0	2
2	14	FW	(Japan) Kenyu Sugimoto	0	0	2	2
2	30	FW	(Japan) Shinzo Koroki	2	0	0	2
2	41	MF	(Japan) Takahiro Sekine	2	0	0	2
5	9	FW	(Japan) Yuki Muto	1	0	0	1
5	11	FW	(Curaçao) Quenten Martinus	0	0	1	1
5	20	MF	(Australia) Thomas Deng	1	0	0	1
Total				16	0	5	21

Last updated: 23 August 2020.
Source: JLeague - Urawa

=== Clean sheets ===
Rank	No.	Pos.	Player	J.League	Emperor's Cup	J.League Cup	Total
1	1	GK	(Japan) Shusaku Nishikawa	4	0	0	4
Total				4	0	0	4

Last updated: 15 August 2020.
Source: JLeague - Urawa
