= 2017 Suruga Bank Championship =

Urawa Red Diamonds	Chapecoense
(Japan)	(Brazil)
1	0
- Date: 15 August 2017
- Venue: Saitama Stadium 2002, Saitama
- Referee: Kim Jong-hyeok (Korea Republic)
- Attendance: 11,002

The 2017 Suruga Bank Championship (Japanese: スルガ銀行チャンピオンシップ2017; Spanish: Copa Suruga Bank 2017) was the tenth edition of the Suruga Bank Championship (also referred to as the J.League Cup / Copa Sudamericana Championship Final), the club football match co-organized by the Japan Football Association, the football governing body of Japan, CONMEBOL, the football governing body of South America, and J.League, the professional football league of Japan, between the champions of the previous season's J.League Cup and Copa Sudamericana.

The match was contested between Japanese team Urawa Red Diamonds, the 2016 J.League Cup champions, and Brazilian team Chapecoense, the 2016 Copa Sudamericana champions. It was hosted by Urawa Red Diamonds at the Saitama Stadium 2002 in Saitama, Japan on 15 August 2017.

Urawa Red Diamonds defeated Chapecoense 1–0 to win their first Suruga Bank Championship title.

== Teams ==
Team	Association / Confederation	Qualification	Previous appearances
(Japan) Urawa Red Diamonds	Japan Football Association	2016 J.League Cup champions	None
(Brazil) Chapecoense	CONMEBOL	2016 Copa Sudamericana champions	None

== Venue ==
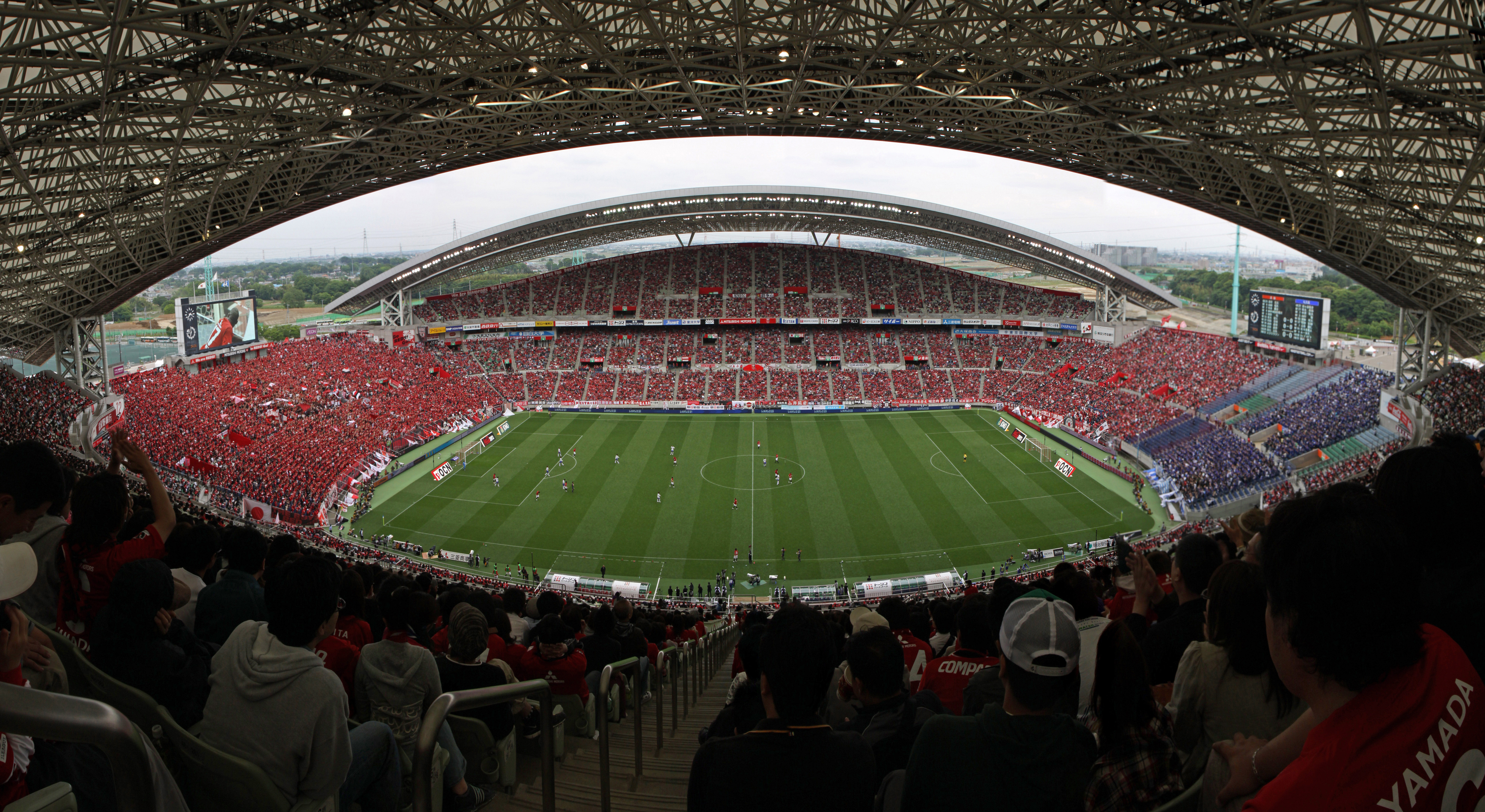
Saitama Stadium 2002 in Saitama, Japan hosted the match.

== Format ==
The Suruga Bank Championship was played as a single match, with the J.League Cup winners hosting the match. If tied at the end of regulation, extra time would not be played, and the penalty shoot-out would be used to determine the winner. A maximum of seven substitutions may be made during the match.

== Match ==
=== Details ===
15 August 2017
19:00 UTC+9

Urawa Red Diamonds (Japan)	1–0	(Brazil) Chapecoense
Abe 90+3' (pen.)	Report (JFA); Report (J.League); Report (CONMEBOL)

Saitama Stadium 2002, Saitama
Attendance: 11,002
Referee: Kim Jong-hyeok (Korea Republic)

Urawa; Red Diamonds	Chapecoense

GK	25	(Japan) Tetsuya Enomoto
CB	2	(Brazil) Maurício Antônio
CB	5	(Japan) Tomoaki Makino
CB	46	(Japan) Ryota Moriwaki		(substituted off) 64'
RM	3	(Japan) Tomoya Ugajin		(substituted off) 77'
CM	10	(Japan) Yōsuke Kashiwagi
CM	18	(Japan) Yoshiaki Komai		(substituted off) 64'
LM	22	(Japan) Yuki Abe (c)
RW	8	(Brazil) Rafael Silva	(yellow card) 56'
CF	9	(Japan) Yuki Muto		(substituted off) 90+7'
LW	21	(Slovenia) Zlatan Ljubijankić		(substituted off) 90+7'
Substitutes:
GK	1	(Japan) Shusaku Nishikawa
DF	6	(Japan) Wataru Endo		(substituted on) 64'
MF	14	(Japan) Tadaaki Hirakawa		(substituted on) 77'
MF	15	(Japan) Kazuki Nagasawa		(substituted on) 90+7'
MF	38	(Japan) Daisuke Kikuchi		(substituted on) 64'
MF	39	(Japan) Shinya Yajima
FW	19	(Japan) Ado Onaiwu		(substituted on) 90+7'
Manager:
(Japan) Takafumi Hori

GK	93	(Brazil) Jandrei
RB	3	(Brazil) Douglas Grolli (c)	(yellow card) 27'
CB	6	(Brazil) Reinaldo
CB	14	(Brazil) Fabrício Bruno
LB	22	(Brazil) Apodi
CM	5	(Brazil) Moisés Ribeiro		(substituted off) 79'
CM	11	(Brazil) Luiz Antônio	(yellow card) 65'	(substituted off) 90+5'
CM	25	(Brazil) Lucas Mineiro
RW	7	(Ecuador) Cristian Penilla		(substituted off) 60'
CF	10	(Brazil) Túlio de Melo
LW	17	(Brazil) Arthur
Substitutes:
GK	12	(Brazil) Elias
DF	21	(Brazil) Luiz Otávio		(substituted on) 90+5'
DF	26	(Brazil) Diego Renan
MF	33	(Brazil) Lucas Marques		(substituted on) 79'
MF	40	(Venezuela) Luis Manuel Seijas
FW	9	(Brazil) Wellington Paulista		(substituted on) 60'
FW	23	(Ecuador) Fernando Guerrero
Manager:
(Brazil) Vinícius Eutrópio

Assistant referees:
Yoon Kwang-yeol (Korea Republic)
Kim Young-ha (Korea Republic)
Fourth official:
Kim Hee-gon (Korea Republic)

== See also ==
- 2016 J.League Cup Final
- 2016 Copa Sudamericana Finals
