= Shūsaku Nishikawa =

Japanese footballer (born 1986)

Shūsaku Nishikawa 西川 周作
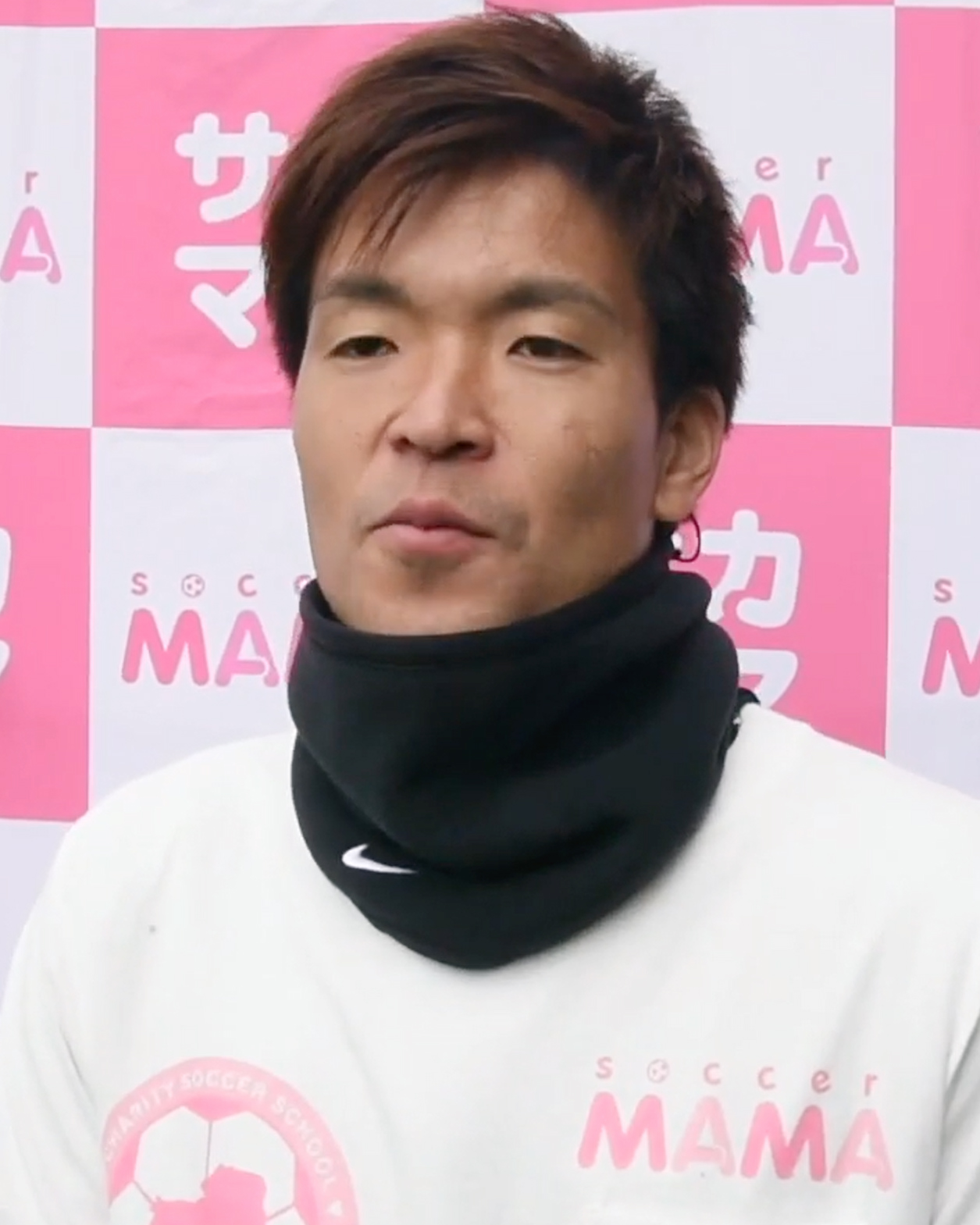
- Nishikawa in 2019

Personal information
- Full name: Shūsaku Nishikawa
- Date of birth: 18 June 1986 (age 40)
- Place of birth: Usa, Ōita, Japan
- Height: 1.83 m (6 ft 0 in)
- Position: Goalkeeper

Team information
- Current team: Urawa Red Diamonds
- Number: 1

Youth career
- 1995–1998: Yokkaichi Minami Elementary School
- 1999–2001: Usa FC
- 2002–2004: Oita Trinita

Senior career*
Years	Team	Apps	(Gls)
2005–2009	Oita Trinita	118	(0)
2010–2013	Sanfrecce Hiroshima	135	(0)
2014–	Urawa Red Diamonds	432	(0)

International career^{‡}
2005	Japan U-20	4	(0)
2007–2008	Japan U-23	8	(0)
2009–2017	Japan	31	(0)
Medal record
Representing Japan
AFC Asian Cup
Gold medal – first place	2011 Qatar
AFC U-19 Championship
Bronze medal – third place	2004 Malaysia
- * Club domestic league appearances and goals as of 21 August 2026 ‡ National team caps and goals as of 22 December 2017, 12:22 (UTC)

Shūsaku Nishikawa (西川 周作, Nishikawa Shūsaku; born 18 June 1986) is a Japanese professional footballer who plays as a goalkeeper for J1 League club Urawa Red Diamonds being its vice-captain.

== Club career ==
Nishikawa is a product of Oita's youth system and was promoted to the top team in 2005. He made his J.League Division 1 debut on 2 July 2005 for Oita Trinita in a match against Yokohama F. Marinos. He became a regular in the 2006 season.

After the relegation of Oita Trinita, Nishikawa signed on 30 December 2009 for J.League Division 1 club, Sanfrecce Hiroshima.

On 5 January 2014, Nishikawa was announce official transfer to Urawa Red Diamonds as permanently for 2014 season after contract expiration with Sanfrecce Hiroshima.

== International career ==
Nishikawa was a member of the Japan U20 national team for the 2005 World Youth Championship finals. He played full time in all four matches. He was also a member of the Japan U23 national team at the 2008 Summer Olympics. He played full time in all three matches.

He made his full international debut for Japan on 8 October 2009 in a 2011 Asian Cup qualification against Hong Kong.

== Career statistics ==
=== Club ===
As of match played 21 August 2026.

Appearances and goals by club, season and competition
Club	Season	League			Emperor's Cup		J. League Cup		ACL		Other (Note: Includes Pan-Pacific Championship, Suruga Bank Championship, FIFA Club World Cup, J. League Championship and Japanese Super Cup.)		Total	
Club	Season	Division	Apps	Goals	Apps	Goals	Apps	Goals	Apps	Goals	Apps	Goals	Apps	Goals
Oita Trinita	2005	J. League Div. 1	21	0	3	0	1	0	—		—		25	0
Oita Trinita	2006	J. League Div. 1	30	0	1	0	5	0	—		—		36	0
Oita Trinita	2007	J. League Div. 1	11	0	2	0	2	0	—		—		15	0
Oita Trinita	2008	J. League Div. 1	22	0	0	0	5	0	—		—		27	0
Oita Trinita	2009	J. League Div. 1	34	0	1	0	3	0	—		1	0	39	0
Oita Trinita	Total		118	0	7	0	16	0	—		1	0	142	0
Sanfrecce Hiroshima	2010	J. League Div. 1	34	0	1	0	4	0	5	0	—		44	0
Sanfrecce Hiroshima	2011	J. League Div. 1	34	0	0	0	1	0	—		—		35	0
Sanfrecce Hiroshima	2012	J. League Div. 1	34	0	0	0	4	0	—		—		38	0
Sanfrecce Hiroshima	2013	J. League Div. 1	33	0	3	0	1	0	5	0	4	0	46	0
Sanfrecce Hiroshima	Total		135	0	4	0	10	0	10	0	4	0	163	0
Urawa Red Diamonds	2014	J. League Div. 1	34	0	2	0	2	0	—		—		38	0
Urawa Red Diamonds	2015	J1 League	34	0	3	0	0	0	5	0	2	0	44	0
Urawa Red Diamonds	2016	J1 League	34	0	0	0	1	0	8	0	2	0	45	0
Urawa Red Diamonds	2017	J1 League	34	0	0	0	2	0	13	0	3	0	52	0
Urawa Red Diamonds	2018	J1 League	34	0	6	0	5	0	—		—		45	0
Urawa Red Diamonds	2019	J1 League	33	0	2	0	2	0	13	0	1	0	51	0
Urawa Red Diamonds	2020	J1 League	34	0	0	0	1	0	—		—		35	0
Urawa Red Diamonds	2021	J1 League	32	0	6	0	3	0	—		—		41	0
Urawa Red Diamonds	2022	J1 League	32	0	2	0	2	0	7	0	1	0	44	0
Urawa Red Diamonds	2023	J1 League	34	0	1	0	4	0	7	0	3	0	49	0
Urawa Red Diamonds	2024	J1 League	36	0	0	0	0	0	—		0	0	36	0
Urawa Red Diamonds	2025	J1 League	36	0	2	0	1	0	—		3	0	42	0
Urawa Red Diamonds	2026	J1 League	20	0	—		—		—		—		20	0
Urawa Red Diamonds	2026–27	J1 League	2	0	0	0	0	0	—		—		2	0
Urawa Red Diamonds	Total		432	0	24	0	23	0	53	0	12	0	544	0
Career total			685	0	35	0	49	0	63	0	17	0	849	0

=== International ===
Appearances and goals by national team and year
National team	Year	Apps	Goals
Japan	2009	1	0
Japan	2010	2	0
Japan	2011	4	0
Japan	2012	1	0
Japan	2013	4	0
Japan	2014	3	0
Japan	2015	8	0
Japan	2016	8	0
Japan	2017	0	0
Total		31	0

== Honours ==
Oita Trinita

- J.League Cup: 2008

Sanfrecce Hiroshima

- J1 League: 2012
- Japanese Super Cup: 2013

Urawa Red Diamonds

- J. League Cup: 2016
- Suruga Bank Championship: 2017
- AFC Champions League: 2017, 2022
- Emperor's Cup: 2018
- Japanese Super Cup: 2022

Japan

- AFC Asian Cup: 2011
- Kirin Cup: 2011
- EAFF East Asian Cup: 2013

Individual

- J.League Best XI: 2012, 2013, 2014, 2015, 2016, 2023
