= Tomoaki Makino =

Japanese footballer

Tomoaki Makino 槙野 智章
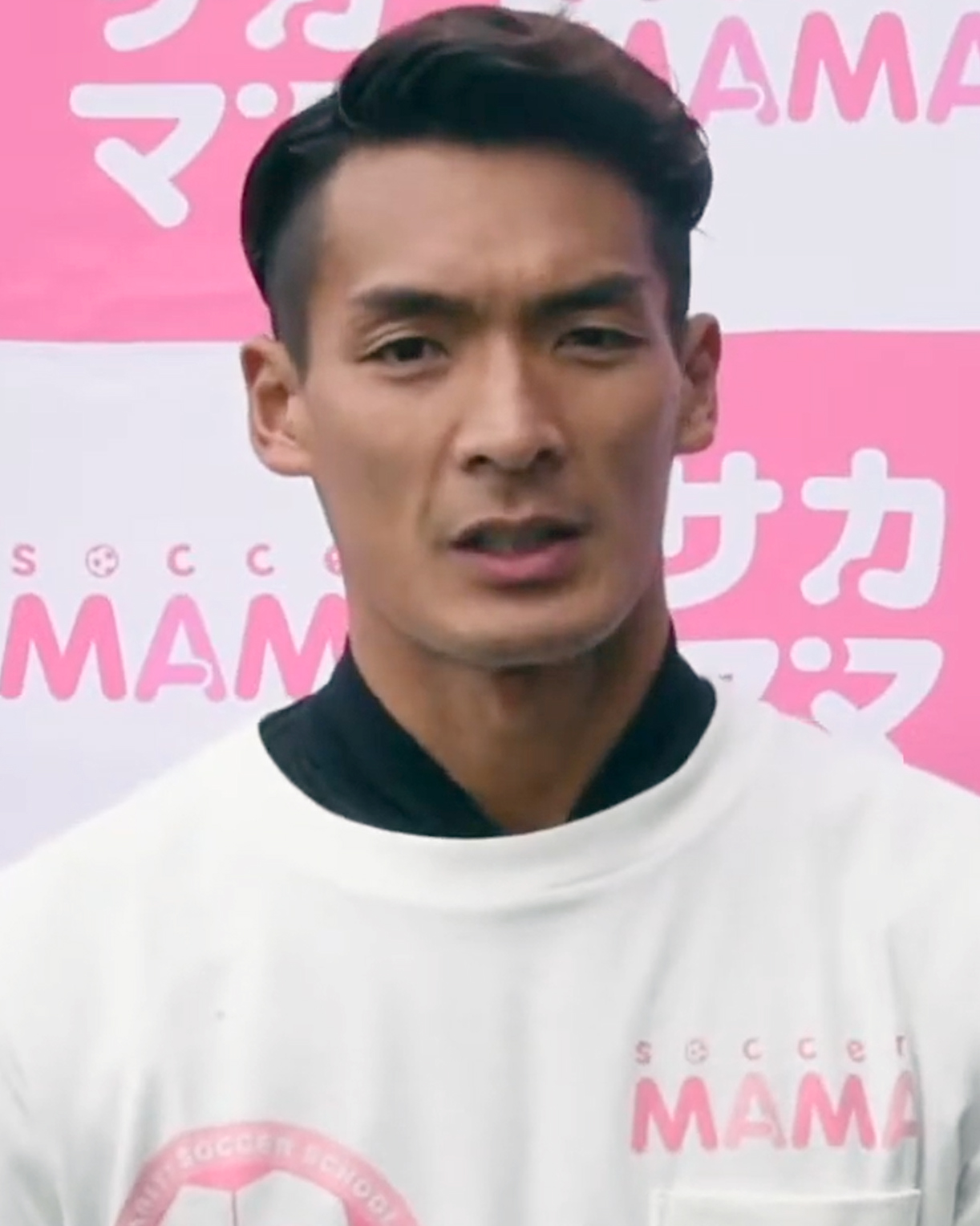
- Makino in 2019

Personal information
- Full name: Tomoaki Makino
- Date of birth: 11 May 1987 (age 39)
- Place of birth: Nishi-ku, Hiroshima, Japan
- Height: 1.82 m (6 ft 0 in)
- Position: Centre back

Team information
- Current team: Fujieda MYFC (manager)

Youth career
- 2000–2005: Sanfrecce Hiroshima

Senior career*
Years	Team	Apps	(Gls)
2006–2010	Sanfrecce Hiroshima	127	(20)
2010–2012	1. FC Köln	8	(0)
2012	→ 1. FC Köln II (loan)	1	(0)
2012	→ Urawa Red Diamonds (loan)	33	(6)
2013–2021	Urawa Red Diamonds	285	(26)
2022	Vissel Kobe	16	(1)

International career^{‡}
2005–2007	Japan U20	9	(1)
2009–2019	Japan	38	(4)

Managerial career
- 2023: Shinagawa CC Second
- 2024–2025: Shinagawa CC Yokohama
- 2026–: Fujieda MYFC
Medal record
Sanfrecce Hiroshima
Runner-up	J.League Cup	2010
Runner-up	Emperor's Cup	2007
Urawa Reds
Winner	AFC Champions League	2017
Runner-up	J1 League	2014
Runner-up	J1 League	2016
Winner	J.League Cup	2016
Runner-up	J.League Cup	2013
Winner	Emperor's Cup	2018
Runner-up	Emperor's Cup	2015
Representing Japan
AFC Asian Cup
Silver medal – second place	2019 United Arab Emirates
AFC U-19 Championship
Silver medal – second place	2006 India
- * Club domestic league appearances and goals as of 24 December 2022, 0:22 ‡ National team caps and goals as of 17 January 2019

Tomoaki Makino (槙野 智章, Makino Tomoaki; born 11 May 1987) is a professional football manager and former Japanese footballer who played as a centre back. He has represented the Japan national team internationally until 2019. He is set to be manager of J2 League club, Fujieda MYFC from 2026.

== Club career ==
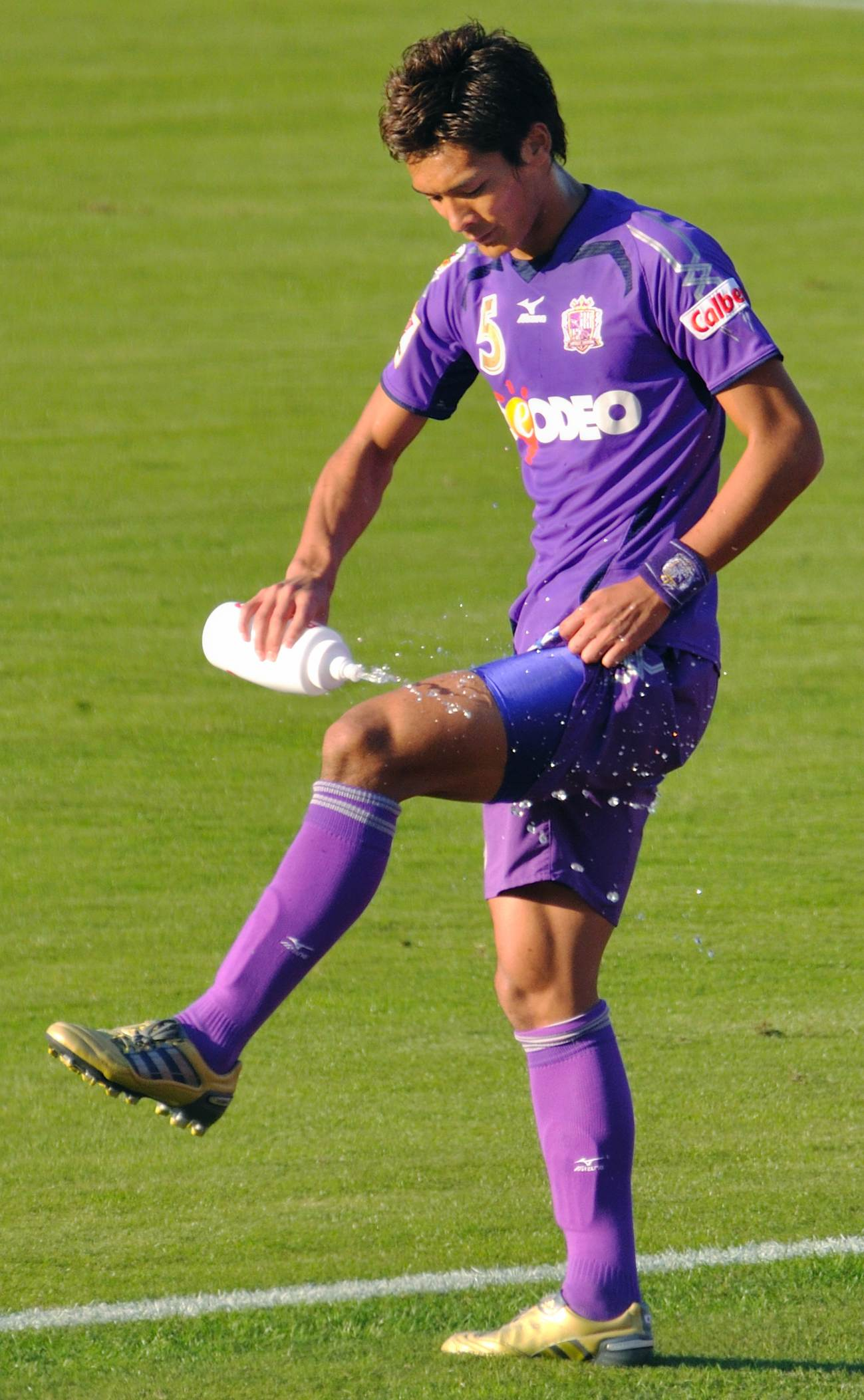
Makino with Sanfrecce Hiroshima in 2010

Makino was born in Nishi-ku, Hiroshima. In January 2012, he returned to J. League, loaned by 1. FC Köln to Urawa Red Diamonds, where he was coached again by his former Sanfrecce's coach, Mihailo Petrović.

Makino announcement retirement from football in 2022 after ending his career with Vissel Kobe and 16 years from professional football.

== International career ==
In July 2007, Makino was elected Japan U-20 national team for 2007 U-20 World Cup. At this tournament, he played 3 matches as center back and scored a goal in the match against Czech Republic.

Makino made his full international debut for Japan on 6 January 2010 in a 2011 Asian Cup qualification against Yemen. In May 2018 he was named in Japan's preliminary squad for the 2018 World Cup in Russia.

== Managerial career ==
On 23 November 2023, Makino announcement officially manager of Top team Kanagawa amateur club, Shinagawa CC from 2024 after joining from Second team in 2023.

After obtaining JFA Pro license on 8 December 2025, Makino announce official manager of J2 League club, Fujieda MYFC from 2026–27 season.

== Career statistics ==
=== Club ===
As of the end 2022 season.

Appearances and goals by club, season and competition
Club	Season	League			National cup		League cup		Continental		Other (Note: Includes Japanese Super Cup, J. League promotion/relegation Series, FIFA Club World Cup, J. League Championship and Suruga Bank Championship.)		Total	
Club	Season	Division	Apps	Goals	Apps	Goals	Apps	Goals	Apps	Goals	Apps	Goals	Apps	Goals
Sanfrecce Hiroshima	2006	J. League Division 1	1	0	0	0	1	0	–		–		2	0
Sanfrecce Hiroshima	2007	J. League Division 1	18	1	5	0	4	0	–		2	0	29	1
Sanfrecce Hiroshima	2008	J. League Division 1	41	7	4	1	–		–		1	0	46	8
Sanfrecce Hiroshima	2009	J. League Division 1	33	8	2	0	2	0	–		–		37	8
Sanfrecce Hiroshima	2010	J. League Division 1	34	4	1	1	4	1	4	1	–		43	7
Sanfrecce Hiroshima	Total		127	20	12	2	11	1	4	1	3	0	157	24
1. FC Köln	2010–11	Bundesliga	5	0	–		–		–		–		5	0
1. FC Köln	2011–12	Bundesliga	3	0	–		–		–		–		3	0
1. FC Köln	Total		8	0	–		–		–		–		8	0
1. FC Köln II	2011–12	Regionalliga West	1	0	–		–		–		–		1	0
Urawa Red Diamonds	2012	J. League Division 1	33	6	3	0	4	0	–		–		40	6
Urawa Red Diamonds	2013	J. League Division 1	34	6	0	0	4	0	–		6	0	44	6
Urawa Red Diamonds	2014	J. League Division 1	31	4	0	0	7	2	–		0	0	38	6
Urawa Red Diamonds	2015	J1 League	34	3	3	0	0	0	5	1	1	0	43	4
Urawa Red Diamonds	2016	J1 League	31	3	0	0	1	0	7	0	0	0	39	3
Urawa Red Diamonds	2017	J1 League	32	2	1	0	0	0	14	1	3	0	50	3
Urawa Red Diamonds	2018	J1 League	32	4	3	1	4	0	–		–		39	5
Urawa Red Diamonds	2019	J1 League	32	0	2	1	0	0	14	2	1	0	49	3
Urawa Red Diamonds	2020	J1 League	26	2	0	0	0	0	–		–		26	2
Urawa Red Diamonds	2021	J1 League	31	2	11	1	5	1	0	0	0	0	47	4
Urawa Red Diamonds	Total		313	32	33	4	18	2	46	4	11	0	421	42
Vissel Kobe	2022	J1 League	16	1	2	0	2	0	–		–		20	1
Vissel Kobe	Total		16	1	2	0	2	0	0	0	0	0	20	1
Career total			464	53	46	5	32	4	55	5	14	0	611	67

=== International ===
Appearances and goals by national team and year
National team	Year	Apps	Goals
Japan	2010	4	0
Japan	2011	4	0
Japan	2012	3	1
Japan	2013	3	0
Japan	2014	0	0
Japan	2015	8	1
Japan	2016	2	0
Japan	2017	4	1
Japan	2018	8	1
Japan	2019	2	0
Total		38	4

Scores and results list Japan's goal tally first, score column indicates score after each Makino goal.

List of international goals scored by Tomoaki Makino
No.	Date	Venue	Opponent	Score	Result	Competition
1	24 February 2012	Yanmar Stadium Nagai, Osaka, Japan	Iceland	3–0	3–1	Friendly
2	11 June 2015	International Stadium Yokohama, Yokohama, Japan	Iraq	2–0	4–0	Friendly
3	10 November 2017	Stade Pierre-Mauroy, Villeneuve-d'Ascq, France	Brazil	1–3	1–3	Friendly
4	27 March 2018	Stade Maurice Dufrasne, Liège, Belgium	Ukraine	1–1	1–2	Friendly

== Managerial statistics ==
As of the start from 2026–27 season.

Managerial record by team and tenure
Team	Nat.	From	To	Record				
Team	Nat.	From	To	G	W	D	L	Win %
Fujieda MYFC	(Japan)	28 November 2025	Present	5	3	0	2	60.00
Career Total				0	0	0	0	—

== Honours ==
Sanfrecce Hiroshima

- J. League Division 2: 2008
- Japanese Super Cup: 2008

Urawa Red Diamonds

- Emperor's Cup: 2018, 2021
- J. League Cup: 2016
- AFC Champions League: 2017
- Suruga Bank Championship: 2017

Japan

- EAFF East Asian Cup: 2013
- Kirin Cup: 2009, 2011
- AFC Asian Cup runner-up: 2019

Individual

- J.League Best XI: 2010, 2015, 2016
- J. League Fair Play Award: 2010
