= Zlatan Ljubijankić =

Slovenian footballer (born 1983)

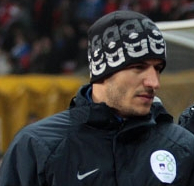
- Ljubijankić with Slovenia in 2009

Personal information
- Date of birth: 15 December 1983 (age 42)
- Place of birth: Ljubljana, SR Slovenia, SFR Yugoslavia
- Height: 1.86 m (6 ft 1 in)
- Position: Forward

Youth career
- –2002: Slovan

Senior career*
Years	Team	Apps	(Gls)
2002–2008	Domžale	155	(40)
2008–2012	Gent	125	(27)
2012–2014	Omiya Ardija	71	(17)
2015–2018	Urawa Red Diamonds	81	(15)
2019	Slovan	3	(2)
Total		435	(101)

International career
2003	Slovenia U20	2	(0)
2004–2005	Slovenia U21	9	(2)
2006	Slovenia B	2	(1)
2006–2015	Slovenia	48	(6)

Managerial career
- 2019–2022: Slovan
- * Club domestic league appearances and goals

Zlatan Ljubijankić (Slovene pronunciation: [ˈzlatan ljubiˈjaŋkitʃ]; Bosnian: [zlǎtan ʎubǐjaŋkitɕ]; born 15 December 1983) is a Slovenian retired footballer who played as a forward.

== International career ==
Ljubijankić was a member of the Slovenia national team between 2006 and 2015. He scored one of the three Slovenian goals at the 2010 FIFA World Cup final tournament, against the United States on the second matchday, in an eventual 2–2 draw. Ljubijankić earned a total of 48 caps for the national team, scoring 6 goals.

== Career statistics ==
=== Club ===
Appearances and goals by club, season and competition
Club	Season	League			National cup		League cup		Continental		Other (Note: Includes Belgian First Division A playoff rounds, Slovenian Supercup, Japanese Super Cup, J. League Championship, Suruga Bank Championship, and FIFA Club World Cup)		Total	
Club	Season	Division	Apps	Goals	Apps	Goals	Apps	Goals	Apps	Goals	Apps	Goals	Apps	Goals
Domžale	2002–03	Slovenian Second League	22	5	2	0	—		—		—		24	5
Domžale	2003–04	Slovenian PrvaLiga	29	3	1	0	—		—		—		30	3
Domžale	2004–05	Slovenian PrvaLiga	29	6	2	1	—		—		—		31	7
Domžale	2005–06	Slovenian PrvaLiga	30	9	2	0	—		5	0	—		37	9
Domžale	2006–07	Slovenian PrvaLiga	27	10	0	0	—		3	4	—		30	14
Domžale	2007–08	Slovenian PrvaLiga	18	7	2	5	—		4	2	1	0	25	14
Domžale	Total		155	40	9	6	—		12	6	1	0	177	52
Gent	2007–08	Belgian First Division	7	0	2	1	—		—		—		9	1
Gent	2008–09	Belgian First Division	22	8	3	1	—		1	0	—		26	9
Gent	2009–10	Belgian First Division	32	5	3	1	—		4	0	—		39	6
Gent	2010–11	Belgian Pro League	34	6	6	1	—		9	0	—		49	7
Gent	2011–12	Belgian Pro League	30	8	2	0	—		—		2	0	34	8
Gent	Total		125	27	16	4	—		14	0	2	0	157	31
Omiya Ardija	2012	J. League Division 1	12	4	1	1	0	0	—		—		13	5
Omiya Ardija	2013	J. League Division 1	27	6	0	0	2	1	—		—		29	7
Omiya Ardija	2014	J. League Division 1	32	7	1	2	1	0	—		—		34	9
Omiya Ardija	Total		71	17	2	3	3	1	—		—		76	21
Urawa Red Diamonds	2015	J1 League	29	8	3	0	0	0	3	1	2	1	37	10
Urawa Red Diamonds	2016	J1 League	26	4	1	0	5	1	8	1	2	0	42	6
Urawa Red Diamonds	2017	J1 League	21	2	3	3	0	0	12	2	4	0	40	7
Urawa Red Diamonds	2018	J1 League	5	1	1	0	3	0	—		—		9	1
Urawa Red Diamonds	Total		81	15	8	3	8	1	23	4	8	1	129	24
Career total			432	99	35	16	11	2	49	10	11	1	538	128

=== International ===
Appearances and goals by national team and year
National team	Year	Apps	Goals
Slovenia
Slovenia	2006	3	1
Slovenia	2007	1	0
Slovenia	2008	3	1
Slovenia	2009	8	2
Slovenia	2010	10	2
Slovenia	2011	8	0
Slovenia	2012	4	0
Slovenia	2013	5	0
Slovenia	2014	2	0
Slovenia	2015	4	0
Total		48	6

Scores and results list Slovenia's goal tally first, score column indicates score after each Ljubijankić goal.

List of international goals scored by Zlatan Ljubijankić
No.	Date	Venue	Opponent	Score	Result	Competition
1	28 February 2006	GSZ Stadium, Larnaka, Cyprus	Cyprus	1–0	1–0	Friendly
2	11 October 2008	Ljudski vrt, Maribor, Slovenia	Northern Ireland	2–0	2–0	2010 World Cup qualification
3	12 August 2009	Ljudski vrt, Maribor, Slovenia	San Marino	5–0	5–0	2010 World Cup qualification
4	5 September 2009	Wembley, London, England	England	1–2	1–2	Friendly
5	18 June 2010	Ellis Park Stadium, Johannesburg, South Africa	United States	2–0	2–2	2010 FIFA World Cup
6	11 August 2010	Stožice Stadium, Ljubljana, Slovenia	Australia	2–0	2–0	Friendly

== Honours ==
Domžale

- Slovenian First League: 2006–07
- Slovenian Supercup: 2007

Gent

- Belgian Cup: 2010

Urawa Red Diamonds

- J1 League First Stage: 2015
- J.League Cup: 2016
- Suruga Bank Championship: 2017
- AFC Champions League: 2017
- Emperor's Cup: 2018

Individual

- J. League Division 1 Player of the Month: 2013 (April)
