= Haruki Izawa =

Japanese footballer

Personal information
- Date of birth: 14 June 1999 (age 27)
- Place of birth: Miyazaki, Japan
- Height: 1.78 m (5 ft 10 in)
- Position: Midfielder

Team information
- Current team: Giravanz Kitakyushu
- Number: 14

Youth career
- Ayukinbara SSC
- JFA Academy Kumamoto Uki
- –2018: Urawa Red Diamonds

Senior career*
Years	Team	Apps	(Gls)
2018–2020	Urawa Red Diamonds	0	(0)
2018–2019	→ Tokushima Vortis (loan)	0	(0)
2020	→ Kagoshima United (loan)	4	(0)
2021–	Giravanz Kitakyushu	107	(4)

International career
2016	Japan U17	1	(0)
2015–2017	Japan U18	3	(0)
- * Club domestic league appearances and goals as of 24 August 2026

Haruki Izawa (井澤 春輝, Izawa Haruki; born 14 June 1999) is a Japanese footballer currently playing as a midfielder for Giravanz Kitakyushu.

== Career statistics ==
=== Club ===
As of 10 November 2020.

Appearances and goals by club, season and competition
Club	Season	League			Emperor's Cup		J. League Cup		Other		Total	
Club	Season	Division	Apps	Goals	Apps	Goals	Apps	Goals	Apps	Goals	Apps	Goals
Urawa Red Diamonds	2018	J1 League	0	0	0	0	0	0	0	0	0	0
Urawa Red Diamonds	2019	J1 League	0	0	0	0	0	0	0	0	0	0
Urawa Red Diamonds	Total		0	0	0	0	0	0	0	0	0	0
Tokushima Vortis (loan)	2018	J2 League	0	0	0	0	0	0	0	0	0	0
Tokushima Vortis (loan)	2019	J2 League	0	0	2	0	0	0	0	0	2	0
Tokushima Vortis (loan)	Total		0	0	2	0	0	0	0	0	2	0
Kagoshima United (loan)	2020	J3 League	3	0	0	0	0	0	0	0	3	0
Career total			3	0	2	0	0	0	0	0	5	0
