= Yuki Muto =

Japanese footballer

Yuki Muto 武藤 雄樹
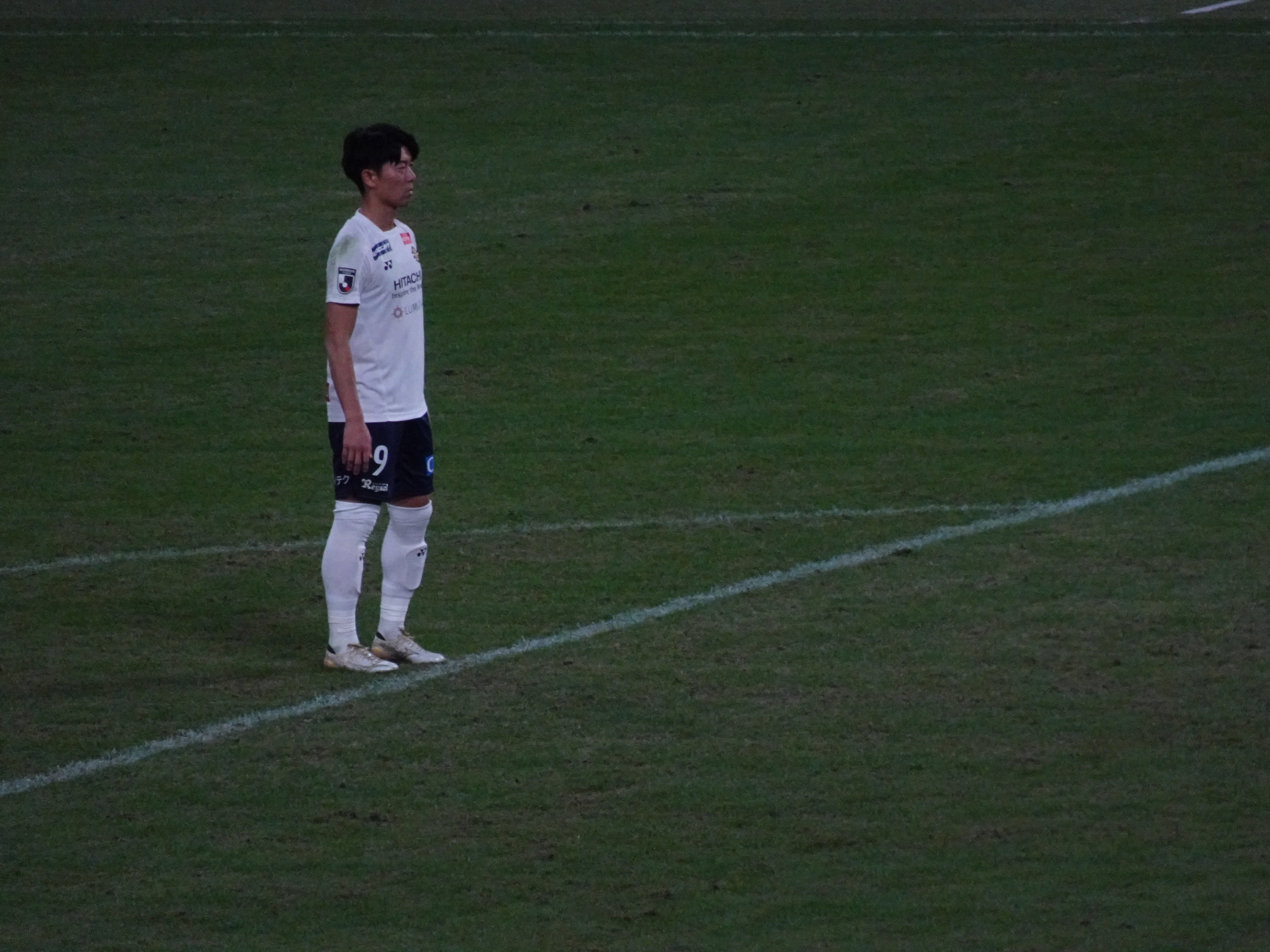
- Yuki Muto (2023)

Personal information
- Full name: Yuki Muto
- Date of birth: November 7, 1988 (age 38)
- Place of birth: Zama, Kanagawa, Japan
- Height: 1.70 m (5 ft 7 in)
- Position: Forward

Team information
- Current team: SC Sagamihara
- Number: 11

Youth career
- FC Sirius
- FC Shonan
- 2004–2006: Buso High School

College career
Years	Team	Apps	(Gls)
2007–2010	Ryutsu Keizai University		

Senior career*
Years	Team	Apps	(Gls)
2011–2014	Vegalta Sendai	96	(10)
2015–2021	Urawa Red Diamonds	269	(53)
2021–2024	Kashiwa Reysol	69	(10)
2024-	SC Sagamihara	48	(10)

International career^{‡}
2015	Japan	2	(2)
Medal record
Vegalta Sendai
Runner-up	J1 League	2012
Urawa Reds
Winner	AFC Champions League	2017
Runner-up	J1 League	2016
Winner	J.League Cup	2016
Winner	Emperor's Cup	2018
Runner-up	Emperor's Cup	2015
- * Club domestic league appearances and goals as of 17 August 2026 ‡ National team caps and goals as of 4 August 2015

Yuki Muto (武藤 雄樹, Mutō Yūki; born November 7, 1988) is a Japanese football player who currently plays for SC Sagamihara.

== International career ==
On 23 July 2015, Japan's coach Vahid Halilhodžić called him for the upcoming 2015 EAFF East Asian Cup. During this tournament, he scored two goals and became the top scorer.

=== International goals ===
Scores and results list Japan's goal tally first.

No	Date	Venue	Opponent	Score	Result	Competition
1.	2 August 2015	Wuhan Sports Center Stadium, Wuhan, China	North Korea	1–0	1–2	2015 EAFF East Asian Cup
2.	9 August 2015	Wuhan Sports Center Stadium, Wuhan, China	China	1–1	1–1	2015 EAFF East Asian Cup

== Club statistics ==
Updated to 5 November 2022.

Appearances and goals by club, season and competition
Club	Season	League			Emperor's Cup		J. League Cup		AFC		Other		Total	
Club	Season	Division	Apps	Goals	Apps	Goals	Apps	Goals	Apps	Goals	Apps	Goals	Apps	Goals
Vegalta Sendai	2011	J1 League	5	1	3	2	1	0	-		–		9	3
Vegalta Sendai	2012	J1 League	13	1	1	0	7	1	-		–		21	2
Vegalta Sendai	2013	J1 League	22	0	1	0	1	0	5	0	–		29	0
Vegalta Sendai	2014	J1 League	30	4	1	0	6	1	-		–		37	5
Urawa Red Diamonds	2015	J1 League	32	13	4	0	2	0	3	1	2	0	36	14
Urawa Red Diamonds	2016	J1 League	34	12	1	0	5	1	6	3	2	0	46	16
Urawa Red Diamonds	2017	J1 League	31	6	2	1	2	1	12	2	3	1	50	11
Urawa Red Diamonds	2018	J1 League	32	7	6	0	5	0	-		-		43	7
Urawa Red Diamonds	2019	J1 League	23	1	1	0	2	0	9	2	-		35	3
Urawa Red Diamonds	2020	J1 League	28	2	-		1	0	-		-		29	2
Urawa Red Diamonds	2021	J1 League	16	0	3	0	1	0	-		-		20	0
Kashiwa Reysol	2021	J1 League	13	0	0	0	0	0	-		-		13	0
Kashiwa Reysol	2022	J1 League	19	7	2	0	0	0	-		-		21	7
Total			298	54	26	3	40	4	35	8	7	1	389	70

^{1}Includes Japanese Super Cup, J. League Championship and FIFA Club World Cup.

== National team statistics ==
Japan national team
Year	Apps	Goals
2015	2	2
Total	2	2

== Honours ==
=== Club ===
Urawa Red Diamonds

- AFC Champions League: 2017
- J. League Cup: 2016
- Emperor's Cup: 2018
