= 2017 Urawa Red Diamonds season =

Urawa Red Diamonds
2017 season
- Manager: Mihailo Petrović; Takafumi Hori
- Stadium: Saitama Stadium 2002
- J1 League: 7th
- Emperor's Cup: Fourth round
- YBC Levain Cup: Quarterfinals
- Top goalscorer: League: Shinzo Koroki (20); All: Shinzo Koroki (27)
- Average home league attendance: 33,542（J1）

2017 Urawa Red Diamonds season.

== J1 League ==
=== League table ===
| Pos | Team | Pld | W | D | L | GF | GA | GD | Pts |
|---|---|---|---|---|---|---|---|---|---|
| 5 | Yokohama F. Marinos | 34 | 17 | 8 | 9 | 45 | 36 | +9 | 59 |
| 6 | Júbilo Iwata | 34 | 16 | 10 | 8 | 50 | 30 | +20 | 58 |
| 7 | Urawa Red Diamonds | 34 | 14 | 7 | 13 | 64 | 54 | +10 | 49 |
| 8 | Sagan Tosu | 34 | 13 | 8 | 13 | 41 | 44 | −3 | 47 |
| 9 | Vissel Kobe | 34 | 13 | 5 | 16 | 40 | 45 | −5 | 44 |

Source: Meiji Yasuda J1 League
Rules for classification: 1) Points; 2) Goal difference; 3) Goals scored

=== Match details ===
J1 League match details
| Match | Date | Team | Score | Team | Venue | Attendance |
|---|---|---|---|---|---|---|
| 1 | 2017.02.25 | Yokohama F. Marinos | 3-2 | Urawa Reds | Nissan Stadium | 39,284 |
| 2 | 2017.03.04 | Urawa Reds | 3-1 | Cerezo Osaka | Saitama Stadium 2002 | 43,826 |
| 3 | 2017.03.10 | Urawa Reds | 4-1 | Ventforet Kofu | Saitama Stadium 2002 | 22,711 |
| 4 | 2017.03.19 | Gamba Osaka | 1-1 | Urawa Reds | Suita City Football Stadium | 34,733 |
| 5 | 2017.04.01 | Vissel Kobe | 1-3 | Urawa Reds | Noevir Stadium Kobe | 18,889 |
| 6 | 2017.04.07 | Urawa Reds | 7-0 | Vegalta Sendai | Saitama Stadium 2002 | 25,372 |
| 7 | 2017.04.16 | FC Tokyo | 0-1 | Urawa Reds | Ajinomoto Stadium | 38,248 |
| 8 | 2017.04.22 | Urawa Reds | 3-2 | Hokkaido Consadole Sapporo | Saitama Stadium 2002 | 36,880 |
| 9 | 2017.04.30 | Omiya Ardija | 1-0 | Urawa Reds | NACK5 Stadium Omiya | 12,401 |
| 10 | 2017.05.04 | Urawa Reds | 0-1 | Kashima Antlers | Saitama Stadium 2002 | 57,447 |
| 11 | 2017.05.14 | Albirex Niigata | 1-6 | Urawa Reds | Denka Big Swan Stadium | 30,864 |
| 12 | 2017.05.20 | Urawa Reds | 3-3 | Shimizu S-Pulse | Saitama Stadium 2002 | 33,458 |
| 14 | 2017.06.04 | Kashiwa Reysol | 1-0 | Urawa Reds | Hitachi Kashiwa Stadium | 14,096 |
| 15 | 2017.06.18 | Urawa Reds | 2-4 | Júbilo Iwata | Saitama Stadium 2002 | 34,766 |
| 16 | 2017.06.25 | Sagan Tosu | 2-1 | Urawa Reds | Best Amenity Stadium | 17,913 |
| 17 | 2017.07.01 | Urawa Reds | 4-3 | Sanfrecce Hiroshima | Saitama Stadium 2002 | 30,853 |
| 13 | 2017.07.05 | Kawasaki Frontale | 4-1 | Urawa Reds | Kawasaki Todoroki Stadium | 22,561 |
| 18 | 2017.07.09 | Urawa Reds | 2-1 | Albirex Niigata | Saitama Stadium 2002 | 28,740 |
| 22 | 2017.07.22 | Cerezo Osaka | 4-2 | Urawa Reds | Yanmar Stadium Nagai | 32,711 |
| 19 | 2017.07.29 | Hokkaido Consadole Sapporo | 2-0 | Urawa Reds | Sapporo Dome | 33,353 |
| 20 | 2017.08.05 | Urawa Reds | 2-2 | Omiya Ardija | Saitama Stadium 2002 | 45,411 |
| 21 | 2017.08.09 | Ventforet Kofu | 0-1 | Urawa Reds | Yamanashi Chuo Bank Stadium | 14,489 |
| 23 | 2017.08.19 | Urawa Reds | 2-1 | FC Tokyo | Saitama Stadium 2002 | 31,818 |
| 24 | 2017.08.27 | Shimizu S-Pulse | 1-2 | Urawa Reds | IAI Stadium Nihondaira | 16,194 |
| 25 | 2017.09.09 | Urawa Reds | 1-2 | Kashiwa Reysol | Saitama Stadium 2002 | 31,619 |
| 26 | 2017.09.17 | Júbilo Iwata | 1-1 | Urawa Reds | Shizuoka Stadium | 23,783 |
| 27 | 2017.09.23 | Urawa Reds | 2-2 | Sagan Tosu | Saitama Stadium 2002 | 29,557 |
| 28 | 2017.10.01 | Vegalta Sendai | 2-3 | Urawa Reds | Yurtec Stadium Sendai | 18,026 |
| 29 | 2017.10.14 | Urawa Reds | 1-1 | Vissel Kobe | Saitama Stadium 2002 | 29,931 |
| 30 | 2017.10.22 | Urawa Reds | 3-3 | Gamba Osaka | Saitama Stadium 2002 | 21,603 |
| 31 | 2017.10.29 | Sanfrecce Hiroshima | 0-1 | Urawa Reds | Edion Stadium Hiroshima | 17,178 |
| 32 | 2017.11.05 | Kashima Antlers | 1-0 | Urawa Reds | Kashima Soccer Stadium | 33,356 |
| 33 | 2017.11.29 | Urawa Reds | 0-1 | Kawasaki Frontale | Saitama Stadium 2002 | 24,605 |
| 34 | 2017.12.02 | Urawa Reds | 0-1 | Yokohama F. Marinos | Saitama Stadium 2002 | 41,618 |

== Emperor's Cup ==
| Match | Date | Team | Score | Team | Venue | Attendance |
|---|---|---|---|---|---|---|
| 2R | 2017.05.21 | Urawa Reds | 3-2 | Grulla Morioka | Urawa Komaba Stadium | 5,038 |
| 3R | 2017.07.12 | Urawa Reds | 1-0 | Roasso Kumamoto | Urawa Komaba Stadium | 5,806 |
| 4R | 2017.09.20 | Urawa Reds | 2-4 | Kashima Antlers | Kumagaya Athletic Stadium | 10,051 |

== YBC Levain Cup ==
| Match | Date | Team | Score | Team | Venue | Attendance |
|---|---|---|---|---|---|---|
| QF | 2017.08.30 | Cerezo Osaka | 0-0 | Urawa Reds | Yanmar Stadium Nagai | 7,784 |
| QF | 2017.09.03 | Urawa Reds | 2-2 | Cerezo Osaka | Saitama Stadium 2002 | 23,116 |

== FUJI XEROX Supercup ==
| Match | Date | Team | Score | Team | Venue | Attendance |
|---|---|---|---|---|---|---|
| F | 2017.02.18 | Kashima Antlers | 3-2 | Urawa Reds | Nissan Stadium | 48,250 |

== AFC Champions League ==
| Match | Date | Team | Score | Team | Venue | Attendance |
|---|---|---|---|---|---|---|
| 1 | 2017.02.21 | Western Sydney Wanderers | 0-4 | Urawa Reds | Campbelltown Stadium | 5,590 |
| 2 | 2017.02.28 | Urawa Reds | 5-2 | FC Seoul | Saitama Stadium 2002 | 18,727 |
| 3 | 2017.03.15 | Shanghai SIPG | 3-2 | Urawa Reds | Shanghai Stadium | 35,333 |
| 4 | 2017.04.11 | Urawa Reds | 1-0 | Shanghai SIPG | Saitama Stadium 2002 | 21,858 |
| 5 | 2017.04.26 | Urawa Reds | 6-1 | Western Sydney Wanderers | Saitama Stadium 2002 | 19,467 |
| 6 | 2017.05.10 | FC Seoul | 1-0 | Urawa Reds | Seoul World Cup Stadium | 4,933 |
| R16 | 2017.05.24 | Jeju United | 2-0 | Urawa Reds | Jeju Stadium | 1,913 |
| R16 | 2017.05.31 | Urawa Reds | 3-0 aet | Jeju United | Saitama Stadium 2002 | 19,149 |
| QF | 2017.08.23 | Kawasaki Frontale | 3-1 | Urawa Reds | Todoroki Athletics Stadium | 18,080 |
| QF | 2017.09.13 | Urawa Reds | 4-1 | Kawasaki Frontale | Saitama Stadium 2002 | 26,785 |
| SF | 2017.09.27 | Shanghai SIPG | 1-1 | Urawa Reds | Shanghai Stadium | 33,513 |
| SF | 2017.10.18 | Urawa Reds | 1-0 | Shanghai SIPG | Saitama Stadium 2002 | 44,375 |
| F | 2017.11.18 | Al-Hilal FC | 1-1 | Urawa Reds | King Fahd International Stadium | 59,136 |
| F | 2017.11.25 | Urawa Reds | 1-0 | Al-Hilal FC | Saitama Stadium 2002 | 57,727 |

== FIFA Club World Cup ==
| Match | Date | Team | Score | Team | Venue | Attendance |
|---|---|---|---|---|---|---|
| 2R | 2017.12.09 | Al Jazira Club | 1-0 | Urawa Reds | Zayed Sports City Stadium | 15,593 |
| 5P | 2017.12.12 | Wydad Casablanca | 2-3 | Urawa Reds | Hazza bin Zayed Stadium | 4,281 |

== International Matches ==
| Match | Date | Team | Score | Team | Venue | Attendance |
|---|---|---|---|---|---|---|
| Saitama City Cup | 2017.02.12 | Urawa Reds | 1-1 | FC Seoul | Urawa Komaba Stadium | 11,444 |
| J.League World Challenge | 2017.07.15 | Urawa Reds | 2-3 | Borussia Dortmund | Saitama Stadium 2002 | 58,327 |
| Suruga Bank Championship | 2017.08.15 | Urawa Reds | 1-0 | Chapecoense | Saitama Stadium 2002 | 11,002 |
