= 2013 Urawa Red Diamonds season =

Urawa Red Diamonds
2013 season
- Manager: Mihailo Petrović
- Stadium: Saitama Stadium 2002
- J1 League: 6th

2013 Urawa Red Diamonds season.

== Final Table ==
Pos	Team	Pld	W	D	L	GF	GA	GD	Pts	Qualification or relegation
4	Cerezo Osaka	34	16	11	7	53	32	+21	59	Qualification for 2014 AFC Champions League group stage (Note: The winners of the 2013 Emperor's Cup qualify for the group stage of the 2014 AFC Champions League. As the Emperor's Cup winners were Yokohama F. Marinos, who had already qualified to ACL through the championship, the remaining spot was awarded to the fourth-placed team.)
5	Kashima Antlers	34	18	5	11	60	52	+8	59	
6	Urawa Red Diamonds	34	17	7	10	66	56	+10	58	
7	Albirex Niigata	34	17	4	13	48	42	+6	55	
8	FC Tokyo	34	16	6	12	61	47	+14	54	

Updated to match(es) played on 7 December 2013. Source: J.League Division 1
Rules for classification: 1) points; 2) goal difference; 3) number of goals scored.

== Squad ==
Note: Flags indicate national team as defined under FIFA eligibility rules; some limited exceptions apply. Players may hold more than one non-FIFA nationality.

No.	Pos.	Nation	Player
1	GK	JPN	Norihiro Yamagishi
18	GK	JPN	Nobuhiro Kato
2	DF	JPN	Keisuke Tsuboi
4	DF	JPN	Daisuke Nasu
5	DF	JPN	Tomoaki Makino
6	DF	JPN	Nobuhisa Yamada
12	DF	JPN	Koji Noda
17	DF	JPN	Mitsuru Nagata
46	DF	JPN	Ryota Moriwaki
3	MF	JPN	Tomoya Ugajin
7	MF	JPN	Tsukasa Umesake
8	MF	JPN	Yōsuke Kashiwagi
10	MF	BRA	Marcio Richardes
11	MF	JPN	Kunimitsu Sekiguchi

No.	Pos.	Nation	Player
13	MF	JPN	Keita Suzuki
14	MF	JPN	Tadaaki Hirakawa
22	MF	JPN	Yūki Abe
24	MF	JPN	Genki Haraguchi
27	MF	JPN	Shuto Kojimi
29	MF	JPN	Shinya Yajima
34	MF	JPN	Naoki Yamada
19	FW	JPN	Toyofumi Sakano
30	FW	JPN	Shinzo Koroki

== Results ==
=== J1 League ===
2 March 2013 1	Sanfrecce Hiroshima	1–2	Urawa Red Diamonds	Hiroshima
15:30 JST	Koji Morisaki 55'		Yosuki Kashigawi 38'; Genki Haraguchi 52'	Stadium: Edion Stadium Hiroshima; Attendance: 27,911; Referee: Toshimitsu Yoshida

9 March 2013 2	Urawa Red Diamonds	1–0	Nagoya Grampus	Midori-ku, Saitama
16:00 JST	Tomoya Ugajin 54'			Stadium: Saitama Stadium 2002; Attendance: 52,293; Referee: Ryuji Sato

16 March 2013 3	Oita Trinita	2–2	Urawa Red Diamonds	Ōita
14:00 JST	Takuya Marutani 3'; Daiki Takamatsu 5'		Genki Haraguchi 8'; Yūki Abe 42'	Stadium: Showa Denko Dome Oita; Attendance: 16,510; Referee: Yudai Yamamoto

30 March 2013 4	Albirex Niigata	0–2	Urawa Red Diamonds	Niigata
16:00 JST			Tomoaki Makino 6'; Marcio Richardes 90+2'	Stadium: Denka Big Swan Stadium; Attendance: 29,095; Referee: Masaaki Iemoto

6 April 2013 5	Urawa Red Diamonds	2–1	Júbilo Iwata	Midori-ku, Saitama
20:00 JST	Ryota Moriwaki 78'; Genki Haraguchi 90+2'		Ryoichi Maeda 26'	Stadium: Saitama Stadium 2002; Attendance: 23,295; Referee: Hajime Matsuo

14 April 2013 6	Urawa Red Diamonds	2–0	Shonan Bellmare	Midori-ku, Saitama
16:00 JST	Shinzo Koroki 30'; Yōsuke Kashiwagi 73'			Stadium: Saitama Stadium 2002; Attendance: 36,477; Referee: Toshimitsu Yoshida

20 April 2013 7	Omiya Ardija	1–0	Urawa Red Diamonds	Saitama
17:00 JST	Zlatan Ljubijankič 45+2'			Stadium: NACK5 Stadium Omiya; Attendance: 13,016; Referee: Jumpei Iida

27 April 2013 8	Urawa Red Diamonds	0–1	Shimizu S-Pulse	Midori-ku, Saitama
18:00 JST			Baré 63'	Stadium: Saitama Stadium 2002; Attendance: 37,945; Referee: Hiroyuki Kimura

6 May 2013 9	Cerezo Osaka	2–2	Urawa Red Diamonds	Higashisumiyoshi-ku, Osaka
17:00 JST	Kenyo Sugimoto 63'; Hotaru Yamaguchi 87'		Genki Haraguchi 71'; Daisuke Nasu 82'	Stadium: Yanmar Stadium Nagai; Attendance: 32,378; Referee: Kenji Ogiya

11 May 2013 10	Urawa Red Diamonds	3–1	Kashima Antlers	Midori-ku, Saitama
20:00 JST	Daisuke Nasu 67'; Shinzo Koroki 78'; Tsukasa Umesake 89'		Takuya Nozawa 63'	Stadium: Saitama Stadium 2002; Attendance: 46,649; Referee: Ryuji Sato

v
