= 2015 Urawa Red Diamonds season =

Urawa Red Diamonds
2015 season
- Manager: Mihailo Petrović
- Stadium: Saitama Stadium 2002
- J1 League: 3rd

2015 Urawa Red Diamonds season.

== J1 League ==
=== League table ===
Pos	Team	Pld	W	D	L	GF	GA	GD	Pts	Qualification or relegation
1	Sanfrecce Hiroshima (C)	34	23	5	6	73	30	+43	74	Club World Cup, Champions League group stage and J.League Championship Final
2	Urawa Red Diamonds	34	21	9	4	69	40	+29	72	Champions League group stage and J.League Championship 1st Round
3	Gamba Osaka	34	18	9	7	56	37	+19	63	Champions League group stage and J.League Championship 1st Round
4	FC Tokyo	34	19	6	9	45	33	+12	63	Champions League qualifying play-off (Note: The winner of the 2015 Emperor's Cup qualified for the group stage of the 2016 AFC Champions League. Since the Emperor's Cup winner was Gamba Osaka who were the third-placed team, the qualifying play-off spot was awarded to the fourth-placed team.)
5	Kashima Antlers	34	18	5	11	57	41	+16	59	
6	Kawasaki Frontale	34	17	6	11	62	48	+14	57	
7	Yokohama F. Marinos	34	15	10	9	45	32	+13	55	
8	Shonan Bellmare	34	13	9	12	40	44	−4	48	
9	Nagoya Grampus	34	13	7	14	44	48	−4	46	
10	Kashiwa Reysol	34	12	9	13	46	43	+3	45	
11	Sagan Tosu	34	9	13	12	37	54	−17	40	
12	Vissel Kobe	34	10	8	16	44	49	−5	38	
13	Ventforet Kofu	34	10	7	17	26	43	−17	37	
14	Vegalta Sendai	34	9	8	17	44	48	−4	35	
15	Albirex Niigata	34	8	10	16	41	58	−17	34	
16	Matsumoto Yamaga (R)	34	7	7	20	30	54	−24	28	Relegation to 2016 J2 League
17	Shimizu S-Pulse (R)	34	5	10	19	37	65	−28	25	Relegation to 2016 J2 League
18	Montedio Yamagata (R)	34	4	12	18	24	53	−29	24	Relegation to 2016 J2 League

Updated to match(es) played on 28 November 2015. Source: Meiji Yasuda J1 League Standings
Rules for classification: 1) Points; 2) Goal difference; 3) Goals scored
(C) Champions; (R) Relegated

=== Match details ===
J1 League match details
Match	Date	Team	Score	Team	Venue	Attendance
1-1	2015.03.07	Shonan Bellmare	1-3	Urawa Reds	Shonan BMW Stadium Hiratsuka	14,446
1-2	2015.03.14	Urawa Reds	1-0	Montedio Yamagata	Saitama Stadium 2002	40,802
1-3	2015.03.22	Sanfrecce Hiroshima	0-0	Urawa Reds	Edion Stadium Hiroshima	26,302
1-4	2015.04.04	Urawa Reds	1-0	Matsumoto Yamaga FC	Saitama Stadium 2002	37,154
1-5	2015.04.12	Kawasaki Frontale	1-1	Urawa Reds	Kawasaki Todoroki Stadium	24,992
1-6	2015.04.18	Urawa Reds	2-1	Yokohama F. Marinos	Saitama Stadium 2002	33,793
1-7	2015.04.25	Urawa Reds	2-1	Nagoya Grampus	Saitama Stadium 2002	29,803
1-8	2015.04.29	Ventforet Kofu	0-2	Urawa Reds	Yamanashi Chuo Bank Stadium	13,708
1-9	2015.05.02	Urawa Reds	1-0	Gamba Osaka	Saitama Stadium 2002	53,148
1-11	2015.05.10	Vegalta Sendai	4-4	Urawa Reds	Yurtec Stadium Sendai	19,195
1-12	2015.05.16	Urawa Reds	4-1	FC Tokyo	Saitama Stadium 2002	42,995
1-13	2015.05.23	Urawa Reds	2-1	Kashima Antlers	Saitama Stadium 2002	41,269
1-14	2015.05.30	Sagan Tosu	1-6	Urawa Reds	Best Amenity Stadium	19,249
1-10	2015.06.03	Kashiwa Reysol	3-3	Urawa Reds	Hitachi Kashiwa Stadium	12,620
1-15	2015.06.07	Urawa Reds	1-0	Shimizu S-Pulse	Saitama Stadium 2002	44,424
1-16	2015.06.20	Vissel Kobe	1-1	Urawa Reds	Noevir Stadium Kobe	18,143
1-17	2015.06.27	Urawa Reds	5-2	Albirex Niigata	Saitama Stadium 2002	43,606
2-1	2015.07.11	Matsumoto Yamaga FC	1-2	Urawa Reds	Matsumotodaira Park Stadium	18,605
2-2	2015.07.15	Montedio Yamagata	0-0	Urawa Reds	ND Soft Stadium Yamagata	10,849
2-3	2015.07.19	Urawa Reds	1-2	Sanfrecce Hiroshima	Saitama Stadium 2002	41,492
2-4	2015.07.25	Nagoya Grampus	2-1	Urawa Reds	Paloma Mizuho Stadium	17,624
2-5	2015.07.29	Urawa Reds	1-1	Ventforet Kofu	Saitama Stadium 2002	22,363
2-6	2015.08.12	Albirex Niigata	1-2	Urawa Reds	Denka Big Swan Stadium	27,447
2-7	2015.08.16	Urawa Reds	1-0	Shonan Bellmare	Saitama Stadium 2002	36,185
2-8	2015.08.22	Urawa Reds	3-1	Vegalta Sendai	Saitama Stadium 2002	33,932
2-9	2015.08.29	Yokohama F. Marinos	4-0	Urawa Reds	Nissan Stadium	33,467
2-10	2015.09.11	Urawa Reds	1-0	Kashiwa Reysol	Saitama Stadium 2002	23,957
2-11	2015.09.19	Shimizu S-Pulse	1-4	Urawa Reds	Shizuoka Stadium	19,232
2-12	2015.09.26	Kashima Antlers	1-2	Urawa Reds	Kashima Soccer Stadium	29,030
2-13	2015.10.03	Urawa Reds	1-1	Sagan Tosu	Saitama Stadium 2002	35,015
2-14	2015.10.17	Gamba Osaka	2-1	Urawa Reds	Expo '70 Commemorative Stadium	18,638
2-15	2015.10.24	FC Tokyo	3-4	Urawa Reds	Ajinomoto Stadium	38,952
2-16	2015.11.07	Urawa Reds	1-1	Kawasaki Frontale	Saitama Stadium 2002	46,597
2-17	2015.11.22	Urawa Reds	5-2	Vissel Kobe	Saitama Stadium 2002	52,133
