= 2016 Urawa Red Diamonds season =

Urawa Red Diamonds
2016 season
- Manager: Mihailo Petrovic
- Stadium: Saitama Stadium 2002
- J1 League: 2nd

2016 Urawa Red Diamonds season.

== J1 League ==
=== League table ===
Pos	Team	Pld	W	D	L	GF	GA	GD	Pts	Qualification or relegation
1	Urawa Red Diamonds	34	23	5	6	61	28	+33	74	Champions League group stage and J. League Championship Final
2	Kawasaki Frontale	34	22	6	6	68	39	+29	72	Champions League group stage and J. League Championship 1st Round
3	Kashima Antlers (C)	34	18	5	11	53	34	+19	59	Club World Cup, Champions League group stage and J. League Championship 1st Round

Source: Meiji Yasuda J1 League
Rules for classification: 1) Points; 2) Goal difference; 3) Goals scored.
(C) Champions

=== Match details ===
J1 League match details
Match	Date	Team	Score	Team	Venue	Attendance
1-1	2016.02.27	Kashiwa Reysol	1-2	Urawa Reds	Hitachi Kashiwa Stadium	13,416
1-2	2016.03.06	Urawa Reds	1-2	Júbilo Iwata	Saitama Stadium 2002	43,826
1-3	2016.03.12	Urawa Reds	2-0	Avispa Fukuoka	Saitama Stadium 2002	27,946
1-4	2016.03.20	Shonan Bellmare	0-2	Urawa Reds	Shonan BMW Stadium Hiratsuka	14,419
1-5	2016.04.01	Urawa Reds	2-1	Ventforet Kofu	Saitama Stadium 2002	22,766
1-6	2016.04.10	Yokohama F. Marinos	0-0	Urawa Reds	Nissan Stadium	38,382
1-7	2016.04.16	Urawa Reds	3-1	Vegalta Sendai	Saitama Stadium 2002	31,012
1-8	2016.04.24	Kawasaki Frontale	0-1	Urawa Reds	Kawasaki Todoroki Stadium	25,450
1-9	2016.04.29	Urawa Reds	4-1	Nagoya Grampus	Saitama Stadium 2002	42,547
1-11	2016.05.08	Omiya Ardija	0-1	Urawa Reds	NACK5 Stadium Omiya	13,880
1-12	2016.05.14	Urawa Reds	0-0	Albirex Niigata	Saitama Stadium 2002	33,763
1-14	2016.05.29	Sagan Tosu	0-0	Urawa Reds	Best Amenity Stadium	13,380
1-15	2016.06.11	Urawa Reds	0-2	Kashima Antlers	Saitama Stadium 2002	51,674
1-10	2016.06.15	Gamba Osaka	1-0	Urawa Reds	Suita City Football Stadium	29,397
1-16	2016.06.18	Sanfrecce Hiroshima	4-2	Urawa Reds	Edion Stadium Hiroshima	24,656
1-13	2016.06.22	Urawa Reds	3-2	FC Tokyo	Saitama Stadium 2002	24,368
1-17	2016.06.25	Urawa Reds	3-1	Vissel Kobe	Saitama Stadium 2002	29,462
2-1	2016.07.02	Avispa Fukuoka	1-2	Urawa Reds	Level5 Stadium	18,509
2-2	2016.07.09	Urawa Reds	2-0	Kashiwa Reysol	Saitama Stadium 2002	27,875
2-3	2016.07.13	Vegalta Sendai	0-1	Urawa Reds	Yurtec Stadium Sendai	14,056
2-4	2016.07.17	Urawa Reds	2-2	Omiya Ardija	Saitama Stadium 2002	53,951
2-5	2016.07.23	Kashima Antlers	1-2	Urawa Reds	Kashima Soccer Stadium	30,249
2-6	2016.07.30	Ventforet Kofu	0-2	Urawa Reds	Yamanashi Chuo Bank Stadium	15,508
2-7	2016.08.06	Urawa Reds	4-1	Shonan Bellmare	Saitama Stadium 2002	29,104
2-8	2016.08.13	Nagoya Grampus	0-2	Urawa Reds	Toyota Stadium	29,508
2-9	2016.08.20	Urawa Reds	1-2	Kawasaki Frontale	Saitama Stadium 2002	44,176
2-10	2016.08.27	Vissel Kobe	2-1	Urawa Reds	Noevir Stadium Kobe	14,877
2-11	2016.09.10	Urawa Reds	2-0	Sagan Tosu	Saitama Stadium 2002	28,167
2-12	2016.09.17	FC Tokyo	1-3	Urawa Reds	Ajinomoto Stadium	33,493
2-13	2016.09.25	Urawa Reds	3-0	Sanfrecce Hiroshima	Saitama Stadium 2002	37,005
2-14	2016.10.01	Urawa Reds	4-0	Gamba Osaka	Saitama Stadium 2002	43,415
2-15	2016.10.22	Albirex Niigata	1-2	Urawa Reds	Denka Big Swan Stadium	29,692
2-16	2016.10.29	Júbilo Iwata	0-1	Urawa Reds	Shizuoka Stadium	24,896
2-17	2016.11.03	Urawa Reds	1-1	Yokohama F. Marinos	Saitama Stadium 2002	56,841
