= 2014 Urawa Red Diamonds season =

Urawa Red Diamonds
2014 season
- Manager: Mihailo Petrović
- Stadium: Saitama Stadium 2002
- J1 League: 2nd
- Average home league attendance: 35,516

2014 Urawa Red Diamonds season.

== J1 League ==
Match	Date	Team	Score	Team	Venue	Attendance
1	2014.03.01	Gamba Osaka	0-1	Urawa Reds	Expo '70 Commemorative Stadium	18,438
2	2014.03.08	Urawa Reds	0-1	Sagan Tosu	Saitama Stadium 2002	42,850
3	2014.03.15	Sanfrecce Hiroshima	0-2	Urawa Reds	Edion Stadium Hiroshima	24,734
4	2014.03.23	Urawa Reds	1-1	Shimizu S-Pulse	Saitama Stadium 2002	0
5	2014.03.29	Vissel Kobe	3-1	Urawa Reds	Noevir Stadium Kobe	12,174
6	2014.04.06	Urawa Reds	4-0	Vegalta Sendai	Saitama Stadium 2002	26,762
7	2014.04.12	Nagoya Grampus	1-2	Urawa Reds	Toyota Stadium	19,505
8	2014.04.19	Urawa Reds	1-0	Kawasaki Frontale	Saitama Stadium 2002	35,239
9	2014.04.26	Kashiwa Reysol	3-2	Urawa Reds	Hitachi Kashiwa Stadium	12,367
10	2014.04.29	Urawa Reds	1-0	Yokohama F. Marinos	Saitama Stadium 2002	38,226
11	2014.05.03	Urawa Reds	1-0	FC Tokyo	Saitama Stadium 2002	43,564
12	2014.05.06	Ventforet Kofu	0-0	Urawa Reds	Tokyo National Stadium	36,505
13	2014.05.10	Omiya Ardija	0-2	Urawa Reds	NACK5 Stadium Omiya	13,348
14	2014.05.17	Urawa Reds	1-0	Cerezo Osaka	Saitama Stadium 2002	54,350
15	2014.07.19	Urawa Reds	1-0	Albirex Niigata	Saitama Stadium 2002	30,776
16	2014.07.23	Tokushima Vortis	0-2	Urawa Reds	Pocarisweat Stadium	10,860
17	2014.07.27	Urawa Reds	1-1	Kashima Antlers	Saitama Stadium 2002	39,205
18	2014.08.02	Urawa Reds	2-2	Vissel Kobe	Saitama Stadium 2002	26,494
19	2014.08.09	Kawasaki Frontale	2-1	Urawa Reds	Kawasaki Todoroki Stadium	18,378
20	2014.08.16	Urawa Reds	1-0	Sanfrecce Hiroshima	Saitama Stadium 2002	39,224
21	2014.08.23	FC Tokyo	4-4	Urawa Reds	Ajinomoto Stadium	32,759
22	2014.08.30	Urawa Reds	4-0	Omiya Ardija	Saitama Stadium 2002	42,308
23	2014.09.13	Shimizu S-Pulse	1-4	Urawa Reds	Shizuoka Stadium	19,059
24	2014.09.20	Urawa Reds	3-1	Kashiwa Reysol	Saitama Stadium 2002	31,652
25	2014.09.23	Albirex Niigata	0-2	Urawa Reds	Denka Big Swan Stadium	28,303
26	2014.09.27	Cerezo Osaka	1-0	Urawa Reds	Yanmar Stadium Nagai	22,936
27	2014.10.05	Urawa Reds	2-1	Tokushima Vortis	Saitama Stadium 2002	23,294
28	2014.10.18	Vegalta Sendai	4-2	Urawa Reds	Yurtec Stadium Sendai	18,914
29	2014.10.22	Urawa Reds	0-0	Ventforet Kofu	Saitama Stadium 2002	19,977
30	2014.10.26	Kashima Antlers	1-1	Urawa Reds	Kashima Soccer Stadium	26,566
31	2014.11.03	Yokohama F. Marinos	0-1	Urawa Reds	Nissan Stadium	40,571
32	2014.11.22	Urawa Reds	0-2	Gamba Osaka	Saitama Stadium 2002	56,758
33	2014.11.29	Sagan Tosu	1-1	Urawa Reds	Best Amenity Stadium	19,235
34	2014.12.06	Urawa Reds	1-2	Nagoya Grampus	Saitama Stadium 2002	53,091
