= 2016 J.League Cup =

J.League YBC Levain Cup

Tournament details
- Country: Japan
- Teams: 18

Final positions
- Champions: Urawa Red Diamonds (2nd title)
- Runners-up: Gamba Osaka

Tournament statistics
- Top goal scorer: Toshiyuki Takagi (4 goals)

The 2016 J.League Cup (also known as the 2016 J.League Yamazaki Nabisco Cup, later changed to 2016 J.League YBC Levain Cup for sponsoring purposes) was the 41st edition of the most prestigious Japanese football league cup tournament and the 24th edition under the current J.League Cup format.

== Format ==
Teams from the J1 League took part in the tournament. Sanfrecce Hiroshima, Gamba Osaka, Urawa Red Diamonds and FC Tokyo were given a bye to the quarter-finals due to qualification in the 2016 AFC Champions League. The remaining 14 teams started from the group stage, where they were divided into two groups of seven. The group winners and the runners-up of each group qualified for the quarter-final along with the four teams which qualified for the AFC Champions League.

== Group stage ==
All times are Japan Standard Time (UTC+9)

=== Group A ===
Pos	Team	Pld	W	D	L	GF	GA	GD	Pts	Qualification	VIS	ARD	VEN	BEL	JÚB	ANT	GRA
1	Vissel Kobe	6	5	1	0	15	3	+12	16	Knock-out stage		1–1				4–1	4–0
2	Omiya Ardija	6	4	2	0	5	1	+4	14	Knock-out stage					1–0	1–0	1–0
3	Ventforet Kofu	6	2	2	2	3	4	−1	8		0–2	0–0		1–0			
4	Shonan Bellmare	6	2	1	3	4	6	−2	7		0–2	0–1			0–0		
5	Júbilo Iwata	6	1	2	3	4	7	−3	5		1–2		1–0				1–3
6	Kashima Antlers	6	1	1	4	8	12	−4	4				1–2	2–3	1–1		
7	Nagoya Grampus	6	1	1	4	4	10	−6	4				0–0	0–1		1–3	

Updated to match(es) played on 5 June 2016. Source: 2016J.League Yamazaki Nabisco Cup Group Stage Group A League table and J. League Data
Rules for classification: 1) Points; 2) Goal difference; 3) Goals scored; 4) Head-to-head points; 5) Head-to-head goal difference; 6) Fair-play points; 7) Draw.

==== Matches ====
23 March 2016
19:03

Kashima Antlers	1–2	Ventforet Kofu
Yamamoto 60'	Report	Billy Celeski 6'; Nilson 45'

Kashima Soccer Stadium, Kashima
Attendance: 7,321
Referee: Koichiro Fukushima
23 March 2016
19:00

Omiya Ardija	1–0	Nagoya Grampus
Esaka 37'	Report

Nack5 Stadium Omiya, Ōmiya-ku, Saitama
Attendance: 5,359
Referee: Kazuyoshi Enomoto
23 March 2016
19:04

Júbilo Iwata	1–2	Vissel Kobe
Saito 13'	Report	Pedro Júnior 35'; Leandro 69'

Yamaha Stadium, Iwata
Attendance: 6,695
Referee: Yuichi Nishimura

27 March 2016
14:04

Ventforet Kofu	0–0	Omiya Ardija
	Report

Yamanashi Chuo Bank Stadium, Kōfu
Attendance: 6,331
Referee: Nobutsugu Murakami
27 March 2016
14:04

Nagoya Grampus	0–1	Shonan Bellmare
	Report	Shimamura 87'

Paloma Mizuho Stadium, Nagoya
Attendance: 7,309
Referee: Masuya Ueda
27 March 2016
14:00

Vissel Kobe	4–1	Kashima Antlers
Pedro Júnior 23', 64'; Watanabe 37'; Soma 75'	Report	Yamamoto 84'

Noevir Stadium Kobe, Hyōgo-ku, Kobe
Attendance: 7,024
Referee: Tomohiro Inoue

6 April 2016
19:04

Shonan Bellmare	0–1	Omiya Ardija
	Report	Pečnik 64'

Shonan BMW Stadium Hiratsuka, Hiratsuka
Attendance: 6,134
Referee: Minoru Tojo
6 April 2016
19:04

Júbilo Iwata	1–0	Ventforet Kofu
Matsui 1'	Report

Yamaha Stadium, Iwata
Attendance: 6,541
Referee: Takuto Okabe
6 April 2016
19:04

Nagoya Grampus	1–3	Kashima Antlers
Noda 38'	Report	Endo 52'; Caio 66'; Shoji 71'

Paloma Mizuho Stadium, Nagoya
Attendance: 6,134
Referee: Hiromichi Oka

20 April 2016
19:00

Shonan Bellmare	0–0	Júbilo Iwata
	Report

Shonan BMW Stadium Hiratsuka, Hiratsuka
Attendance: 5,211
Referee: Koichiro Fukushima
20 April 2016
19:00

Nagoya Grampus	0–0	Ventforet Kofu
	Report

Paloma Mizuho Stadium, Nagoya
Attendance: 3,919
Referee: Nobutsugu Murakami
20 April 2016
19:00

Vissel Kobe	1–1	Omiya Ardija
Watanabe 58'	Report	Esaka 17'

Noevir Stadium Kobe, Hyōgo-ku, Kobe
Attendance: 5,077
Referee: Hiroyoshi Takayama

18 May 2016
19:00

Kashima Antlers	2–3	Shonan Bellmare
Nagaki 11'; Doi 26'	Report	Otsuki 18'; Hasegawa 87'; Hanato 90+4'

Kashima Soccer Stadium, Kashima
Attendance: 5,788
Referee: Takuto Okabe
18 May 2016
19:00

Omiya Ardija	1–0	Júbilo Iwata
Keisuke 25'	Report

Nack5 Stadium Omiya, Ōmiya-ku, Saitama
Attendance: 5,985
Referee: Yusuke Araki
18 May 2016
19:00

Ventforet Kofu	0–2	Vissel Kobe
	Report	Tanaka 64'; Seigou 75'

Yamanashi Chuo Bank Stadium, Kōfu
Attendance: 4,723
Referee: Kochiro Fukushima

25 May 2016
19:00

Kashima Antlers	1–1	Júbilo Iwata
Sugimoto 58'	Report	Fujita 17'

Kashima Soccer Stadium, Kashima
Attendance: 5,272
Referee: Masaaki Toma
25 May 2016
19:00

Ventforet Kofu	1–0	Shonan Bellmare
Kawamoto 61'	Report

Yamanashi Chuo Bank Stadium, Kōfu
Attendance: 4,029
Referee: Jumpei Iida
25 May 2016
19:00

Vissel Kobe	4–0	Nagoya Grampus
Nakasaka 10'; Watanabe 19'; Ishizu 88'; Takahashi 90+3'	Report

Noevir Stadium Kobe, Hyōgo-ku, Kobe
Attendance: 5,168
Referee: Hiroyoshi Takayama

5 June 2016
14:00

Omiya Ardija	1–0	Kashima Antlers
Pečnik 87'	Report

Nack5 Stadium Omiya, Ōmiya-ku, Saitama
Attendance: 9,316
Referee: (Poland) Bartosz Frankowski
5 June 2016
14:00

Shonan Bellmare	0–2	Vissel Kobe
	Report	Nakasaka 37'; Fujita 90+1'

TOHO Stadium, Fukushima
Attendance: 4,501
Referee: Akihiko Ikeuchi
5 June 2016
14:00

Júbilo Iwata	1–3	Nagoya Grampus
Bothroyd 64'	Report	Koyamatsu 27'; Takeuchi 37'; Kawamata 39'

Yamaha Stadium, Iwata
Attendance: 8,792
Referee: Kenji Ogiya

=== Group B ===
Pos	Team	Pld	W	D	L	GF	GA	GD	Pts	Qualification	FMA	AVI	FRO	REY	VEG	ALB	SAG
1	Yokohama F. Marinos	6	3	2	1	7	5	+2	11	Knock-out stage		2–1		1–3			1–0
2	Avispa Fukuoka	6	2	3	1	9	7	+2	9	Knock-out stage				2–2		4–2	1–1
3	Kawasaki Frontale	6	2	2	2	9	5	+4	8		0–0	0–1			2–1		
4	Kashiwa Reysol	6	2	2	2	9	8	+1	8				2–1		0–1	1–2	
5	Vegalta Sendai	6	2	2	2	4	5	−1	8		0–2	0–0				1–0	
6	Albirex Niigata	6	2	1	3	6	12	−6	7		1–1		0–5				1–0
7	Sagan Tosu	6	0	4	2	4	6	−2	4				1–1	1–1	1–1		

Updated to match(es) played on 5 June 2016. Source: 2016J.League Yamazaki Nabisco Cup Group Stage Group B League table and J. League Data
Rules for classification: 1) Points; 2) Goal difference; 3) Goals scored; 4) Head-to-head points; 5) Head-to-head goal difference; 6) Fair-play points; 7) Draw.

==== Matches ====
23 March 2016
19:03

Vegalta Sendai	1–0	Albirex Niigata
Enomoto 4'	Report

Yurtec Stadium Sendai, Sendai
Attendance: 6,135
Referee: Yusuke Araki
23 March 2016
19:05

Kawasaki Frontale	0–0	Yokohama F. Marinos
	Report

Todoroki Athletics Stadium, Kawasaki
Attendance: 15,644
Referee: Yudai Yamamoto
23 March 2016
19:04

Avispa Fukuoka	2–2	Kashiwa Reysol
Jogo 17'; Wellington 30'	Report	Wako 55'; Tanaka 77'

Level-5 Stadium, Fukuoka
Attendance: 5,525
Referee: Jumpei Iida

27 March 2016
15:03

Kashiwa Reysol	0–1	Vegalta Sendai
	Report	Tomita 69'

Hitachi Kashiwa Soccer Stadium, Kashiwa
Attendance: 6,944
Referee: Itaru Hirose
27 March 2016
15:03

Kawasaki Frontale	0–1	Avispa Fukuoka
	Report	Tamura 79'

Todoroki Athletics Stadium, Kawasaki
Attendance: 11,510
Referee: Akihiko Ikeuchi
27 March 2016
15:03

Albirex Niigata	1–0	Sagan Tosu
Léo Silva 75'	Report

Denka Big Swan Stadium, Niigata
Attendance: 12,427
Referee: Hiromichi Oka

6 April 2016
19:03

Albirex Niigata	0–5	Kawasaki Frontale
	Report	Taniguchi 8', 23'; Kano 20', 83'; Hashimoto 48'

Denka Big Swan Stadium, Niigata
Attendance: 8,404
Referee: Koichiro Fukushima
6 April 2016
19:04

Sagan Tosu	1–1	Vegalta Sendai
Baek Sung-dong 38'	Report	Kim Min-Tae 86'

Best Amenity Stadium, Tosu
Attendance: 4,195
Referee: Masaaki Toma
6 April 2016
19:34

Yokohama F. Marinos	1–3	Kashiwa Reysol
Togashi 5'	Report	Nakagawa 42'; Masushima 50', 68'

Nippatsu Mitsuzawa Stadium, Yokohama
Attendance: 7,084
Referee: Yuichi Nishimura

20 April 2016
19:00

Vegalta Sendai	0–0	Avispa Fukuoka
	Report

Yurtec Stadium Sendai, Sendai
Attendance: 5,955
Referee: Yusuke Araki
20 April 2016
19:00

Kashiwa Reysol	2–1	Kawasaki Frontale
Diego Oliveira 39'; Taketomi 90+4'	Report	Eduardo Neto 72'

Hitachi Kashiwa Soccer Stadium, Kashiwa
Attendance: 5,543
Referee: Hajime Matsuo
20 April 2016
19:30

Yokohama F. Marinos	1–0	Sagan Tosu
Ito 23'	Report

Nippatsu Mitsuzawa Stadium, Yokohama
Attendance: 4,777
Referee: Jumpei Iida

18 May 2016
19:00

Kashiwa Reysol	1–2	Albirex Niigata
Diego Oliveira 66'	Report	Ito 55'; Kozuka 72'

Hitachi Kashiwa Soccer Stadium, Kashiwa
Attendance: 5,300
Referee: Jumpei Iida
18 May 2016
19:00

Sagan Tosu	1–1	Kawasaki Frontale
Tomiyama 72'	Report	Kim Min-hyeok 16' (o.g.)

Best Amenity Stadium, Tosu
Attendance: 4,779
Referee: Hiromichi Oka
18 May 2016
19:30

Yokohama F. Marinos	2–1	Avispa Fukuoka
Hyodo 73'; Ito 90+4'	Report	Hirai 31'

Nippatsu Mitsuzawa Stadium, Yokohama
Attendance: 5,133
Referee: Shoichiro Mikami

25 May 2016
19:00

Kawasaki Frontale	2–1	Vegalta Sendai
Otsuka 43', 48'	Report	Ramon Lopes 85'

Todoroki Athletics Stadium, Kawasaki
Attendance: 8,801
Referee: (Poland) Bartosz Frankowski
25 May 2016
19:00

Albirex Niigata	1–1	Yokohama F. Marinos
Ibusuki 7'	Report	Nakagawa 72'

Denka Big Swan Stadium, Niigata
Attendance: 8,136
Referee: Nobutsugu Murakami
25 May 2016
19:00

Avispa Fukuoka	1–1	Sagan Tosu
Hirai 85'	Report	Toyoda 45'

Level-5 Stadium, Fukuoka
Attendance: 14,465
Referee: Kenji Ogiya

5 June 2016
14:00

Vegalta Sendai	0–2	Yokohama F. Marinos
	Report	Nakamura 42'; Saito 61'

Yurtec Stadium Sendai, Sendai
Attendance: 12,811
Referee: Yudai Yamamoto
5 June 2016
14:00

Avispa Fukuoka	4–2	Albirex Niigata
Kanamori 16', 37'; Hirai 19'; Jogo 68'	Report	Yamazaki 6'; Suzuki 82'

Level-5 Stadium, Fukuoka
Attendance: 7,209
Referee: Hajime Matsuo
5 June 2016
14:00

Sagan Tosu	1–1	Kashiwa Reysol
Ikeda 31'	Report	Éderson 79'

Best Amenity Stadium, Tosu
Attendance: 5,337
Referee: Yuichi Nishimura

== Knock-out stage ==
All times are Japan Standard Time (UTC+9)

Quarterfinals
Yokohama F. Marinos (a)	1	1	2
Omiya Ardija	2	0	2
Gamba Osaka	1	6	7
Sanfrecce Hiroshima	1	3	4
Urawa Red Diamonds	2	4	6
Vissel Kobe	1	0	1
Avispa Fukuoka	1	0	1
FC Tokyo	1	2	3

Semifinals
Yokohama F. Marinos	0	1	1
Gamba Osaka (a)	0	1	1
Urawa Red Diamonds	2	3	5
FC Tokyo	1	1	2

Finals
Gamba Osaka	1 (4)
Urawa Red Diamonds	1 (5)

=== Quarter-finals ===
==== First leg ====
31 August 2016
19:03

Omiya Ardija	2–1	Yokohama F. Marinos
Mateus 23'; Ienaga 87'	Report	Kanai 71'

NACK5 Stadium Omiya, Saitama
Attendance: 6,283
Referee: Hiroyoshi Takayama

31 August 2016
19:04

Sanfrecce Hiroshima	1–1	Gamba Osaka
Shibasaki 28'	Report	Goya 86'

Hiroshima Big Arch, Hiroshima
Attendance: 5,529
Referee: Yoshiro Imamura

31 August 2016
19:05

Vissel Kobe	1–2	Urawa Red Diamonds
Leandro 35'	Report	Takagi 6'; Zlatan 41'

Misaki Park Stadium, Kobe
Attendance: 7,001
Referee: Yusuke Araki

31 August 2016
19:30

FC Tokyo	1–1	Avispa Fukuoka
Nakajima 62'	Report	Mishima 90'

Ajinomoto Stadium, Chōfu
Attendance: 6,882
Referee: Takuto Okabe

==== Second leg ====
4 September 2016
18:04

Yokohama F. Marinos	1–0	Omiya Ardija
Kayke 45+1'	Report

Nippatsu Mitsuzawa Stadium, Yokohama
Attendance: 8,862
Referee: Yuichi Nishimura

2–2 on aggregate. Yokohama F. Marinos won on away goals

4 September 2016
18:34

Urawa Red Diamonds	4–0	Vissel Kobe
Takagi 39', 60'; Abe 43'; Lee 84'	Report

Saitama Stadium 2002, Saitama
Attendance: 19,253
Referee: Yudai Yamamoto

Urawa Red Diamonds won 6-1 on aggregate.

4 September 2016
19:02

Gamba Osaka	6–3	Sanfrecce Hiroshima
Nagasawa 32', 45+2'; Niwa 55'; Ademilson 60', 63'; Abe 71'	Report	Nogami 24'; Morisaki 52'; Minagawa 79'

Suita City Football Stadium, Suita
Attendance: 12,977
Referee: Nobutsugu Murakami

Gamba Osaka won 7-4 on aggregate.

4 September 2016
19:04

Avispa Fukuoka	0–2	FC Tokyo
	Report	Tanabe 30'; Takahashi 75'

Level5 Stadium, Fukuoka
Attendance: 8,060
Referee: Kenji Ogiya

FC Tokyo won 3-1 on aggregate.

=== Semi-finals ===
==== First leg ====
5 October 2016
19:04

Gamba Osaka	0–0	Yokohama F. Marinos
	Report

Suita City Football Stadium, Suita
Attendance: 11,160
Referee: Hajime Matsuo

5 October 2016
19:34

FC Tokyo	1–2	Urawa Red Diamonds
Higashi 49'	Report	77' Takagi; 80' Muto

Ajinomoto Stadium, Chōfu
Attendance: 13,354
Referee: Masaaki Iemoto

==== Second leg ====
9 October 2016
14:00

Yokohama F. Marinos	1–1	Gamba Osaka
Ito 56'	Report	63' Endō

Nissan Stadium, Yokohama
Attendance: 19,378
Referee: Kenji Ogiya

1–1 on aggregate. Gamba Osaka won on away goals

9 October 2016
14:04

Urawa Red Diamonds	3–1	FC Tokyo
Koroki 24', 38', 53'	Report	81' Nakajima

Saitama Stadium 2002, Saitama
Attendance: 26,876
Referee: Yuichi Nishimura

Urawa Red Diamonds won 5-2 on aggregate.

=== Final ===
15 October 2016
13:05

Gamba Osaka	1–1 (a.e.t.)	Urawa Red Diamonds
Ademilson 17'		76' Lee
Penalties
Fujimoto (penalty scored); Konno (penalty scored); Niwa (penalty scored); Goya (penalty missed); Endō (penalty scored)	4–5	(penalty scored) Abe; (penalty scored) Otani; (penalty scored) Koroki; (penalty scored) Lee; (penalty scored) Endo

Saitama Stadium 2002, Saitama
Attendance: 51,248
Referee: Ryuji Sato

== Top scorers ==
Rank	Scorer	Club	Goals
1	(Japan) Toshiyuki Takagi	Urawa Red Diamonds	4
2	(Japan) Shinzo Koroki	Urawa Red Diamonds	3
2	(Brazil) Pedro Júnior	Vissel Kobe	3
2	(Japan) Kazuma Watanabe	Vissel Kobe	3
2	(Japan) Shoki Hirai	Avispa Fukuoka	3
2	(Japan) Sho Ito	Yokohama F. Marinos	3

Updated to games played on 15 October 2016
Names of players in bold are still active.
Source: J. League Data
