= J.League Championship =

Two-legged championship series

The J.League Championship is a two-legged championship series which determined the season champion for the first 12 J.League seasons (1993–2004) excluding the 1996 season. In the early years, the J.League seasons were divided into two halves, the first and second stages, and the champions of each stage participated in the series. The competition did not take place in 1996, since the single season format was used in that year. Japanese beer company Suntory sponsored the championship, thus the name Suntory Championship was used in the media and among the general public.

As mentioned, the winners of this competition became the champions of the respective season, while the finalist became the runners-up. As for the rest of the table, points from both stages were summed up to rank the clubs from 3rd place down. In 2000, this format created an unusual situation where the 3rd place club, Kashiwa Reysol, had more points than both the season champion and runners-up in the final standing.

The series usually took place at the beginning of December, with the exception of the 1993 season, when it was held, due to the 1993 World Cup Qualifiers, in January.

The league adopted a single season format starting with the 2005 season. The J.League Championship returned for the 2015 season and 2016 season in a heavily modified format to previous incarnations.

== Results ==
- The winners are in bold.
- Venues are indicated in brackets after the score line.

Season	1st stage winners	Aggregate (Extra time & PK)	1st leg score	2nd leg score	2nd stage winners	Note
1993	Kashima Antlers	1–3	0–2 (National)	1–1 (National)	**Verdy Kawasaki**	
1994	Sanfrecce Hiroshima	0–2	0–1 (Hiroshima)	0–1 (National)	**Verdy Kawasaki**	
1995	**Yokohama Marinos**	2–0	1–0 (National)	1–0 (National)	Verdy Kawasaki	
1997	Kashima Antlers	2–4	2–3 (Iwata)	0–1 (Kashima)	**Júbilo Iwata**	A draw decided who would play the home game first.
1998	Júbilo Iwata	2–4	1–2 (National)	1–2 (Kashima)	**Kashima Antlers**	
1999	**Júbilo Iwata**	3–3; 4–2 (pen.)	2–1 (Iwata)	1–2 (Nihondaira)	Shimizu S-Pulse	PK shoot-out was required to decide the winner. (No extra time was played)
2000	Yokohama F. Marinos	0–3	0–0 (Yokohama)	0–3 (National)	**Kashima Antlers**	
2001	Júbilo Iwata	2–2; Extra time 0–1	2–2 (Shizuoka)	0–0 (Kashima)	**Kashima Antlers**	Extra time (with the golden goal rule) was required to decide the winner.
2002	No competition because **Júbilo Iwata** won both stages.					
2003	No competition because **Yokohama F. Marinos** won both stages.					
2004	**Yokohama F. Marinos**	1–1; Extra time 0–0; 4–2 (pen.)	1–0 (Yokohama)	0–1 (Saitama)	Urawa Red Diamonds	Extra time (with the golden goal rule) and penalty shootout were required to decide the winner.

== Clubs who won the most points through a season ==
There are only two occurrences where the club that won the most points in the season also won the championship. They are the 1993 and 1994 seasons, both won by Verdy Kawasaki. The following table shows the clubs that won the most points through a season.

Season	Club
1993	Verdy Kawasaki
1994	Verdy Kawasaki
1995	Verdy Kawasaki
1996	Kashima Antlers
1997	Kashima Antlers
1998	Júbilo Iwata
1999	Shimizu S-Pulse
2000	Kashiwa Reysol
2001	Júbilo Iwata
2002	Júbilo Iwata
2003	Yokohama F. Marinos
2004	Urawa Red Diamonds
2015	Sanfrecce Hiroshima

In the 2000 season, although Kashiwa Reysol won the most points through the season, they could not take part in the J.League Championship because they failed to win either stage. In fact, Júbilo Iwata also won more points through the season than Yokohama F. Marinos and Kashima Antlers who qualified for the Championship. According to the regulation, the official league rankings of Kashiwa and Iwata of that season are third and fourth respectively.

== Suntory Cup '96 J.League Champions' Finals ==
As the 1996 season wasn't divided into stages, the J.League Championship did not take place. Instead, the competition titled the Suntory Cup '96 J.League Champions' Finals was held. The champions and runners-up of the 1996 J.League regular season as well as the finalists of the J.League Cup took part. Nagoya Grampus Eight won and qualified for the 1997 Sanwa Bank Cup.

Participating clubs

- Kashima Antlers (J.League champions)
- Nagoya Grampus Eight (J.League runners-up)
- Shimizu S-Pulse (J.League Cup winners)
- Verdy Kawasaki (J.League Cup runners-up)

Results

Round	Home	Score (Venue)	Away
Semi-finals	Kashima Antlers	1–1; 4–2 (pen.) (Kashima)	Verdy Kawasaki
Semi-finals	Shimizu S-Pulse	0–0; 1–3 (pen.) (Nihondaira)	Nagoya Grampus Eight
Final	Kashima Antlers	0–1 (National)	Nagoya Grampus Eight

== Meiji Yasuda 2015 J.League Championship ==
The Championship stage consisted of a knockout tournament involving the champions of the First and Second Stages, and any team that finishes in the top 3 of the overall table. The team with the best aggregate record earned a bye to the final. The remaining teams playoff for the other spot in the final.

Semifinal		Final
		Sanfrecce Hiroshima	3	1	4
Urawa Red Diamonds	1	Gamba Osaka	2	1	3
Gamba Osaka (a.e.t.)	3

28 November 2015
14:00

Urawa Red Diamonds	1 – 3 (a.e.t.)	Gamba Osaka
Ljubijankić 72'	Report	47' Konno; 117' Fujiharu; 120' Patric

Saitama Stadium 2002, Midori-ku, Saitama
Attendance: 40,696
Referee: Hajime Matsuo

2 December 2015
19:30

Gamba Osaka	2 – 3	Sanfrecce Hiroshima
Nagasawa 60'; Konno 82'	Report	Douglas 80'; Sasaki 90+1'; Kashiwa 90+6'

Osaka Expo '70 Stadium, Suita
Attendance: 17,844
Referee: Kenji Ogiya

5 December 2015
19:30

Sanfrecce Hiroshima	1 – 1	Gamba Osaka
Asano 76'	Report	Konno 28'

Hiroshima Big Arch, Hiroshima
Attendance: 36,609
Referee: Yuichi Nishimura

== See also ==
- Japanese football champions
- Apertura and Clausura for a general explanation of the format
