= 2014 Sanfrecce Hiroshima season =

Sanfrecce Hiroshima
2014 season
- Chairman: Kaoru Koyano
- Manager: Hajime Moriyasu
- Stadium: Hiroshima Big Arch
- J1 League: 8th
- Emperor's Cup: Round of 16
- J.League Cup: Final
- Japanese Super Cup: Winners
- AFC Champions League: Round of 16
- Top goalscorer: League: Hisato Satō (11); All: Hisato Satō (17)
Home colours	Away colours

The 2014 season was Sanfrecce Hiroshima's sixth consecutive season in J.League Division 1, and 44th overall in the Japanese top flight. Sanfrecce Hiroshima also competed in the Emperor's Cup, J.League Cup, Japanese Super Cup, and the AFC Champions League.

== Transfers ==
=== In ===
Position	Nationality	Name	Age	From	Notes
DF	(Japan)	Kyohei Yoshino	19	Tokyo Verdy	
FW	(Japan)	Yusuke Minagawa	22	Chuo University	
DF	(South Korea)	Byeon Jun-Byum	22	Konkuk University	
DF	(Japan)	Soya Takahashi	17	Rissho USHS	
MF	(Japan)	Yusuke Chajima	22	Tokyo Gakugei University	
MF	(Japan)	Yoshifumi Kashiwa	26	Ventforet Kofu	
MF	(Japan)	Kosei Shibasaki	29	Tokushima Vortis	
GK	(Japan)	Takuto Hayashi	31	Vegalta Sendai	
MF	(Japan)	Takuya Marutani	24	Ōita Trinita	Loan return
MF	(Japan)	Tsubasa Yokotake	24	Gainare Tottori	Loan return
MF	(Japan)	Kota Sameshima	21	Gainare Tottori	Loan return
DF	(Japan)	Daiki Nishioka	25	Tochigi SC	Loan return
MF	(Japan)	Junya Osaki	22	Tokushima Vortis	Loan return

=== Out ===
Position	Nationality	Name	Age	To	Notes
MF	(South Korea)	Kim Jung-suk	20	Roasso Kumamoto	Loan
DF	(Japan)	Daiki Nishioka	25	Ehime FC	Free transfer
MF	(Japan)	Tsubasa Yokotake	24	Gainare Tottori	
MF	(Japan)	Tomotaka Okamoto	23	Sagan Tosu	Loan
DF	(Japan)	Hironori Ishikawa	25	Vegalta Sendai	Loan
GK	(Japan)	Shusaku Nishikawa	27	Urawa Red Diamonds	
FW	(Japan)	Sena Inami	21	V-Varen Nagasaki	Loan
DF	(Japan)	Kyohei Yoshino	19	Tokyo Verdy	Loan
MF	(Japan)	Kota Sameshima	21	Nagano Parceiro	Loan
MF	(South Korea)	Lee Dae-heon	20	V-Varen Nagasaki	Loan
MF	(Japan)	Junya Osaki	22	Tokushima Vortis	
MF	(Japan)	Koji Nakajima	36		End of career

== Players ==
=== First Team squad ===
Updated 18 March 2016
Note: Flags indicate national team as defined under FIFA eligibility rules; some limited exceptions apply. Players may hold more than one non-FIFA nationality.

No.	Pos.	Nation	Player
1	GK	JPN	Takuto Hayashi
2	DF	KOR	Hwang Seok-Ho
3	DF	KOR	Byeon Jun-Byum
4	DF	JPN	Hiroki Mizumoto
5	DF	JPN	Kazuhiko Chiba
6	MF	JPN	Toshihiro Aoyama
7	MF	JPN	Kōji Morisaki
8	MF	JPN	Kazuyuki Morisaki
9	FW	JPN	Naoki Ishihara
10	MF	JPN	Yojiro Takahagi
11	FW	JPN	Hisato Satō
13	GK	JPN	Takuya Masuda
14	MF	CRO	Mihael Mikić
16	MF	JPN	Satoru Yamagishi
17	MF	KOR	Park Hyung-Jin

No.	Pos.	Nation	Player
18	MF	JPN	Yoshifumi Kashiwa
21	GK	JPN	Yutaro Hara
22	FW	JPN	Yusuke Minagawa
24	MF	JPN	Gakuto Notsuda
25	MF	JPN	Yusuke Chajima
27	MF	JPN	Kohei Shimizu
28	MF	JPN	Takuya Marutani
29	FW	JPN	Takuma Asano
30	MF	JPN	Kosei Shibasaki
33	DF	JPN	Tsukasa Shiotani
34	MF	JPN	Soya Takahashi
35	DF	JPN	Naoki Otani
36	MF	JPN	Hayao Kawabe
37	DF	JPN	Kazuya Miyahara

== Competitions ==
=== Overview ===
Competition	Record							
Competition	G	W	D	L	GF	GA	GD	Win %
J1 League	34	13	11	10	44	37	+7	38.24
Emperor's Cup	3	2	0	1	7	5	+2	66.67
J.League Cup	5	1	2	2	7	7	+0	20.00
Japanese Super Cup	1	1	0	0	2	0	+2	100.00
AFC Champions League	8	3	3	2	12	11	+1	37.50
Total	51	20	16	15	72	60	+12	39.22

Updated to match played 18 March 2016
Source: Competitions

=== Japanese Super Cup ===
Win Draw Loss

22 February 2014	Sanfrecce Hiroshima	2–0	Yokohama F. Marinos	National Stadium, Tokyo
13:35 JST	Notsuda 6'; Asano 66'	Summary		Attendance: 41,273; Referee: (Japan) Ryuji Sato

=== J1 League ===
Pos	Team	Pld	W	D	L	GF	GA	GD	Pts
6	Kawasaki Frontale	34	16	7	11	56	43	+13	55
7	Yokohama F. Marinos	34	14	9	11	37	29	+8	51
8	Sanfrecce Hiroshima	34	13	11	10	44	37	+7	50
9	FC Tokyo	34	12	12	10	47	33	+14	48
10	Nagoya Grampus	34	13	9	12	47	48	−1	48

Updated to match(es) played on 8 December 2014. Source: J.League Data
Rules for classification: 1) points; 2) goal difference; 3) number of goals scored.

Win Draw Loss

1 March 2014 1	Cerezo Osaka	0–1	Sanfrecce Hiroshima	Higashisumiyoshi-ku, Osaka
12:00 JST	Yamashita (yellow card) 38'	Report	Shibasaki (yellow card) 61'; Shiotani 71'	Stadium: Nagai Stadium; Attendance: 37,079; Referee: Masaaki Toma

8 March 2014 2	Sanfrecce Hiroshima	2–1	Kawasaki Frontale	Asaminami-ku, Hiroshima
10:30 JST	Satō 57'; Aoyama (yellow card) 64'; Shiotani 90+5'	Report	Kobayashi 45+2'; Inamoto (yellow card) 58'; Noborizato (yellow card) 86'; Jeci (red card) 90+2'	Stadium: Hiroshima Big Arch; Attendance: 16,176; Referee: Nobutsugu Murakami

15 March 2014 3	Sanfrecce Hiroshima	0–2	Urawa Red Diamonds	Asaminami-ku, Hiroshima
:00 JST		Report	Koroki 42'; Suzuki (yellow card) 52'; Moriwaki (yellow card) 74' (yellow card) 90+1' (red card); Kashiwagi (yellow card) 82'; Haraguchi (yellow card) 84' (goal) 90+1'	Stadium: Hiroshima Big Arch; Attendance: 24,734; Referee: Hajime Matsuo

23 March 2014 4	Gamba Osaka	1–1	Sanfrecce Hiroshima	Suita
14:00 JST	Endō 25'; Kurata (yellow card) 64'; Sato (yellow card) 86'	Report	Aoyama (yellow card) 32'; Takahagi (yellow card) 55'; Satō 62' (pen.); Notsuda (yellow card) 70'	Stadium: Osaka Expo '70 Stadium; Attendance: 18,301; Referee: Futoshi Nakamura

29 March 2014 5	Sanfrecce Hiroshima	3–1	Tokushima Vortis	Asaminami-ku, Hiroshima
12:00 JST	Shiotani 44'; Ishihara 49'; Notsuda 66'	Report	Takasaki 72'	Stadium: Hiroshima Big Arch; Attendance: 11,766; Referee: Itaru Hirose

6 April 2014 6	Nagoya Grampus	2–5	Sanfrecce Hiroshima	Toyota
11:00 JST	Kennedy 7', 86'; Obu (yellow card) 39'; Tanaka (yellow card) 75'	Report	Takahagi (yellow card) 17'; Satō 20', 63' (pen.); Shiotani 57'; Ishihara 66'; Notsuda 88'	Stadium: Toyota Stadium; Attendance: 15,214; Referee: Minoru Tojo

12 April 2014 7	Sanfrecce Hiroshima	1–0	FC Tokyo	Asaminami-ku, Hiroshima
17:00 JST	Chiba (yellow card) 18' (goal) 80'	Report	Mita (yellow card) 20'; Hirayama (yellow card) 46'	Stadium: Hiroshima Big Arch; Attendance: 12,529; Referee: Toshimitsu Yoshida

20 April 2014 8	Albirex Niigata	0–0	Sanfrecce Hiroshima	Niigata
13:00 JST	Tanaka (yellow card) 25'	Report	Sato (yellow card) 76'	Stadium: Denka Big Swan Stadium; Attendance: 21,452; Referee: Ryuji Sato

26 April 2014 9	Sanfrecce Hiroshima	0–3	Kashima Antlers	Asaminami-ku, Hiroshima
17:00 JST		Report	Shoji (yellow card) 7'; Caio 11'; Doi 19'; Ueda (yellow card) 27'; Ito (yellow card) 42'; Yamamoto (yellow card) 49'; Endo 54'	Stadium: Hiroshima Big Arch; Attendance: 16,992; Referee: Yuichi Nishimura

29 April 2014 10	Sagan Tosu	1–2	Sanfrecce Hiroshima	Tosu
12:00 JST	Mizunuma 13'; Yasuda (yellow card) 60' (yellow card) 87' (red card); Kim Min-hyeok (yellow card) 80'	Report	Yamagishi 17'; Ishihara 82'; Shibasaki (yellow card) 89'	Stadium: Tosu Stadium; Attendance: 17,339; Referee: Takuto Okabe

3 May 2014 11	Vissel Kobe	0–0	Sanfrecce Hiroshima	Kobe
13:00 JST	Takahashi (yellow card) 45'	Report		Stadium: Misaki Park Stadium; Attendance: 17,573; Referee: Masaaki Toma

10 May 2014 12	Sanfrecce Hiroshima	1–1	Shimizu S-Pulse	Asaminami-ku, Hiroshima
12:00 JST	Shiotani 14'; Kazuyuki Morisaki (yellow card) 84'	Report	Novakovič 52'; Yoshida (yellow card) 82'	Stadium: Hiroshima Big Arch; Attendance: 12,960; Referee: Minoru Tojo

18 May 2014 13	Vegalta Sendai	1–0	Sanfrecce Hiroshima	Sendai
11:00 JST	Akamine 16'	Report		Stadium: Yurtec Stadium Sendai; Attendance: 18,863; Referee: Yuichi Nishimura

15 July 2014 14	Sanfrecce Hiroshima	1–2	Yokohama F. Marinos	Asaminami-ku, Hiroshima
17:00 JST	Ishihara 56'	Report	Saito 90'; Ito 90+4'	Stadium: Hiroshima Big Arch; Attendance: 9,515; Referee: Hiroyuki Kimura

19 July 2014 15	Omiya Ardija	3–3	Sanfrecce Hiroshima	Ōmiya-ku, Saitama
17:00 JST	Mrđa (yellow card) 48' (goal) 54', 71'; Ljubijankič 52'	Report	Satō 3', 22'; Ishihara 25'	Stadium: NACK5 Stadium Omiya; Attendance: 9,272; Referee: Koichiro Fukushima

23 July 2014 16	Sanfrecce Hiroshima	5–2	Kashiwa Reysol	Asaminami-ku, Hiroshima
17:00 JST	Satō 22'; Takahagi 32' (yellow card) 43'; Kashiwa 61'; Minagawa 71'; Koji Morisaki 90'	Report	Kudo 11'; Leandro (yellow card) 24'; Suzuki (yellow card) 53'; Kano 55'; Watanabe (yellow card) 75'; Takayama (yellow card) 79'; Masushima (yellow card) 88'	Stadium: Hiroshima Big Arch; Attendance: 12,673; Referee: Yudai Yamamoto

27 July 2014 17	Sanfrecce Hiroshima	1–1	Ventforet Kofu	Asaminami-ku, Hiroshima
17:00 JST	Shibasaki 85'	Report	Cristiano 21'; Ishihara (red card) 33'; Ogi (yellow card) 90+2'	Stadium: Hiroshima Big Arch; Attendance: 15,101; Referee: Yoshiro Imamura

2 August 2014 18	Kashima Antlers	5–1	Sanfrecce Hiroshima	Kashima
16:30 JST	Caio 9'; Nakamura (yellow card) 48'; Gaku Shibasaki (yellow card) 67' (goal) 83'; Luis Alberto 67'; Nishi 70'; Davi 81'	Report	Shibasaki (yellow card) 34'; Ishihara (yellow card) 48'; Kashiwa 55'	Stadium: Kashima Soccer Stadium; Attendance: 16,632; Referee: Kenji Ogiya

11 August 2014 19	Sanfrecce Hiroshima	1–0	Sagan Tosu	Asaminami-ku, Hiroshima
17:00 JST	Minagawa 81'	Report	Yasuda (yellow card) 18'; Mizunuma (yellow card) 60'	Stadium: Hiroshima Big Arch; Attendance: 12,026; Referee: Toshimitsu Yoshida

16 August 2014 20	Urawa Red Diamonds	1–0	Sanfrecce Hiroshima
16:00 JST	Abe 22'	Report		Attendance: 39,224; Referee: Nobutsugu Murakami

23 August 2014 21	Sanfrecce Hiroshima	0–0	Cerezo Osaka	Asaminami-ku, Hiroshima
17:00 JST		Report	Maruhashi (yellow card) 41'; Kim Seong-jun (yellow card) 77'	Stadium: Hiroshima Big Arch; Attendance: 21,102; Referee: Jumpei Iida

30 August 2014 22	Tokushima Vortis	0–1	Sanfrecce Hiroshima	Naruto
16:30 JST	Takasaki (yellow card) 34'; Osaki (yellow card) 83'	Report	Minagawa 32' (pen.); Chiba (yellow card) 89'	Stadium: Pocarisweat Stadium; Attendance: 11,640; Referee: Yosuke Kubota

13 September 2014 23	Sanfrecce Hiroshima	0–1	Gamba Osaka	Asaminami-ku, Hiroshima
17:00 JST	Aoyama (yellow card) 41'	Report	Iwashita (yellow card) 11'; Usami 33'; Sato (yellow card) 44'; Abe (yellow card) 71'	Stadium: Hiroshima Big Arch; Attendance: 17,490; Referee: Hajime Matsuo

20 September 2014 24	Sanfrecce Hiroshima	2–0	Albirex Niigata	Asaminami-ku, Hiroshima
:00 JST	Aoyama 23'; Ishihara 63'	Report	Ibusuki (yellow card) 79'	Stadium: Hiroshima Big Arch; Attendance: 11,937; Referee: Takuto Okabe

23 September 2014 25	Yokohama F. Marinos	1–0	Sanfrecce Hiroshima	Yokohama
13:00 JST	Ito 87' (pen.)	Report	Hayashi (yellow card) 87'	Stadium: International Stadium Yokohama; Attendance: 23,438; Referee: Itaru Hirose

27 September 2014 26	Sanfrecce Hiroshima	1–1	Vissel Kobe	Asaminami-ku, Hiroshima
16:30 JST	Asano (yellow card) 49'; Shiotani 87'	Report	Marquinhos 71'	Stadium: Hiroshima Big Arch; Attendance: 12,433; Referee: Hiroyoshi Takayama

5 October 2014 27	Kashiwa Reysol	0–0	Sanfrecce Hiroshima	Kashiwa
13:30 JST	Suzuki (yellow card) 36'; Fujita (yellow card) 55'; Otani (yellow card) 56'	Report	Shimizu (yellow card) 55'	Stadium: Hitachi Kashiwa Soccer Stadium; Attendance: 6,115; Referee: Hiroyuki Kimura

18 October 2014 28	Sanfrecce Hiroshima	4–0	Nagoya Grampus	Asaminami-ku, Hiroshima
14:00 JST	Shiotani (yellow card) 56'; Ishihara 57', 82' (pen.); Satō 60'; Mizumoto 69' (pen.)	Report	Córdoba (yellow card) 54' (yellow card) 67' (red card); Tanaka (yellow card) 81'	Stadium: Hiroshima Big Arch; Attendance: 16,304; Referee: Yosuke Kubota

22 October 2014 29	FC Tokyo	2–1	Sanfrecce Hiroshima	Chōfu, Tokyo
17:00 JST	Watanabe 25'; Ota (yellow card) 59'; Muto 75'	Report	Takahagi (yellow card) 51'; Satō 55'	Stadium: Ajinomoto Stadium; Attendance: 13,048; Referee: Kazuyoshi Enomoto

26 October 2014 30	Shimizu S-Pulse	1–3	Sanfrecce Hiroshima	Shimizu-ku, Shizuoka
:00 JST	Takagi 80'	Report	Notsuda (yellow card) 21'; Ishihara 28', 38'; Satō 65'	Stadium: IAI Stadium Nihondaira; Attendance: 13,098; Referee: Hiroyuki Takayama

2 November 2014 31	Sanfrecce Hiroshima	1–1	Omiya Ardija	Asaminami-ku, Hiroshima
14:00 JST	Yamagishi 76'	Report	Shiotani 11' (o.g.); Kitano (yellow card) 67'; Yokoyama (yellow card) 81'	Stadium: Hiroshima Big Arch; Attendance: 14,024; Referee: Yudai Yamamoto

22 November 2014 32	Ventforet Kofu	2–0	Sanfrecce Hiroshima	Kofu
12:00 JST	Hatao (yellow card) 57'; Yamamoto 65'; Arai 77'	Report		Stadium: Yamanashi Chuo Bank Stadium; Attendance: 14,067; Referee: Kenji Ogiya

29 November 2014 33	Kawasaki Frontale	1–1	Sanfrecce Hiroshima	Kawasaki
12:00 JST	Ōkubo 34'; Renatinho (yellow card) 45+1'	Report	Satō 88'	Stadium: Todoroki Athletics Stadium; Attendance: 15,468; Referee: Ryuji Sato

6 December 2014 34	Sanfrecce Hiroshima	2–0	Vegalta Sendai	Asaminami-ku, Hiroshima
13:30 JST	Kashiwa (yellow card) 9'; Takahagi 64', 67'	Report	Murakami (yellow card) 25'	Stadium: Hiroshima Big Arch; Attendance: 17,189; Referee: Minoru Tojo

=== Emperor's Cup ===
Win Draw Loss Upcoming fixture

12 July 2014 Second round	Sanfrecce Hiroshima	5-2	Fukuoka University	Fukuyama
16:00	Notsuda 22', 90'; Shimizu 53'; Shiotani 64'; Minagawa 90+4'	Report	Yamasaki 14', 43'	Stadium: Fukuyama Takegahana Stadium; Attendance: 5,196; Referee: Kenji Ogiya

27 August 2014 Third round	Sanfrecce Hiroshima	1-0	Mito HollyHock	Asaminami-ku, Hiroshima
19:00	Sato 26'			Stadium: Hiroshima Big Arch

10 September 2014 Round of 16	Sanfrecce Hiroshima	1-3	Gamba Osaka	Asaminami-ku, Hiroshima
	Minagawa 90'	Report	Sato 31', 45'; Lins 85'	Stadium: Hiroshima Big Arch

=== J.League Cup ===
Win Draw Loss

==== Quarter-finals ====
3 September 2014 First leg	Sanfrecce Hiroshima	0–0	Urawa Red Diamonds	Asaminami-ku, Hiroshima
19:04				Stadium: Hiroshima Big Arch; Attendance: 6,718; Referee: Yudai Yamamoto

7 September 2014 Second leg	Urawa Red Diamonds	2–2	Sanfrecce Hiroshima	Saitama
18:00	Abe 34'; Makino 71'		Notsuda 39'; Sato 48'	Stadium: Saitama Stadium 2002; Attendance: 17,645; Referee: Yoshiro Imamura

==== Semi-finals ====
9 October 2014 First leg	Sanfrecce Hiroshima	2–0	Kashiwa Reysol	Asaminami-ku, Hiroshima
19:03	Sato 41', 50'			Stadium: Hiroshima Big Arch; Attendance: 5,516; Referee: Toshimitsu Yoshida

12 October 2014 Second leg	Kashiwa Reysol	2–1	Sanfrecce Hiroshima	Hitachi Kashiwa Soccer Stadium
16:00	Leandro 38', 51'		Ishihara 74'	Attendance: 9,010; Referee: Masaaki Toma

==== Final ====
8 November 2014	Sanfrecce Hiroshima	2–3	Gamba Osaka	Saitama Stadium 2002
13:05	Sato 20', 35'		Patric 38', 54'; Omori 71'	Attendance: 38,126; Referee: Yuichi Nishimura

=== AFC Champions League ===
Sanfrecce Hiroshima have qualified for the group stage of the 2014 AFC Champions League by winning the 2013 J.League Division 1.

==== Group stage ====
Pos	Team	Pld	W	D	L	GF	GA	GD	Pts	Qualification
1	(South Korea) FC Seoul	6	3	2	1	9	6	+3	11	Advance to knockout stage
2	(Japan) Sanfrecce Hiroshima	6	2	3	1	9	8	+1	9	Advance to knockout stage
3	(China) Beijing Guoan	6	1	3	2	7	8	−1	6	
4	(Australia) Central Coast Mariners	6	2	0	4	4	7	−3	6	

Win Draw Loss Upcoming fixture

25 February 2014	Sanfrecce Hiroshima (Japan)	1–1	(China) Beijing Guoan	Hiroshima Big Arch, Hiroshima
19:00 UTC+9	Chiba 77'	Report	Ha Dae-sung 62'	Attendance: 6,021; Referee: Abdulla Hassan Mohamed (United Arab Emirates)

11 March 2014	Central Coast Mariners (Australia)	2–1	(Japan) Sanfrecce Hiroshima	Central Coast Stadium, Gosford
19:30 UTC+11	Sterjovski 23', 32'	Report	Shiotani 21'	Attendance: 2,168; Referee: Abdulrahman Abdou (Qatar)

19 March 2014	Sanfrecce Hiroshima (Japan)	2–1	(South Korea) FC Seoul	Hiroshima Big Arch, Hiroshima
19:00 UTC+9	Takahagi 53'; Shiotani 79'	Report	Rafael Costa 60'	Attendance: 6,281; Referee: Valentin Kovalenko (Uzbekistan)

1 April 2014	FC Seoul (South Korea)	2–2	(Japan) Sanfrecce Hiroshima	Seoul World Cup Stadium, Seoul
19:30 UTC+9	Yun Il-lok 53'; Rafael Costa 90+4' (pen.)	Report	Notsuda 20'; Hwang Seok-ho 70'	Attendance: 8,897; Referee: Fahad Al-Marri (Qatar)

16 April 2014	Beijing Guoan (China)	2–2	(Japan) Sanfrecce Hiroshima	Workers Stadium, Beijing
19:30 UTC+8	Shao Jiayi 55'; Guerrón 60'	Report	Ishihara 66'; Zhao Hejing 70' (o.g.)	Attendance: 36,738; Referee: Marai Al Awaji (Saudi Arabia)

23 April 2014	Sanfrecce Hiroshima (Japan)	1–0	(Australia) Central Coast Mariners	Hiroshima Big Arch, Hiroshima
19:30 UTC+9	Yamagishi 72'	Report		Attendance: 9,778; Referee: Ravshan Irmatov (Uzbekistan)

==== Round of 16 ====
7 May 2014 First leg	Sanfrecce Hiroshima (Japan)	3–1	(Australia) Western Sydney Wanderers	Hiroshima Big Arch, Hiroshima
19:00 UTC+9	Ishihara 51', 65'; Shibasaki 90+1'	Report	Juric 78' (pen.)	Attendance: 8,423; Referee: Abdullah Al Hilali (Oman)

14 May 2014 Second leg	Western Sydney Wanderers (Australia)	2–0	(Japan) Sanfrecce Hiroshima	Parramatta Stadium, Sydney
19:30 UTC+10	Cole 55'; Šantalab 85'	Report		Attendance: 10,639; Referee: Nawaf Shukralla (Bahrain)
