= 2015 Sanfrecce Hiroshima season =

Sanfrecce Hiroshima
2015 season
- Chairman: Kaoru Koyano
- Manager: Hajime Moriyasu
- Stadium: Hiroshima Big Arch
- J1 League: Winners
- Emperor's Cup: Semi-finals
- J.League Cup: Group stage
- FIFA Club World Cup: Third place
- Top goalscorer: League: Douglas (21); All: Douglas (24)
- Highest home attendance: 36,609 vs Gamba Osaka (5 December 2015)
- Lowest home attendance: 3,179 vs Roasso Kumamoto (14 October 2015)
- Biggest win: 8–0 v Hiroshima University of Economics (5 September 2015)
- Biggest defeat: 0–3 v Kashiwa Reysol (16 August 2015); 3–0 v Gamba Osaka (29 December 2015)
Home colours	Away colours

The 2015 season was Sanfrecce Hiroshima's seventh consecutive season in J.League Division 1, and 45th overall in the Japanese top flight. Sanfrecce Hiroshima also competed in the Emperor's Cup, J.League Cup, and the FIFA Club World Cup. The club secured its third J1 League title after beating Gamba Osaka on aggregate on 5 December 2015.

== Transfers ==
=== In ===
Position	Nationality	Name	Age	From	Notes
DF	(Japan)	Sho Sasaki	25	Ventforet Kofu	
DF	(Japan)	Yasumasa Kawasaki	22	Ryutsu Keizai University FC	
FW	(Brazil)	Douglas	27	Tokushima Vortis	Loan
MF	(Japan)	Kohei Kudo	30	Kyoto Sanga FC	
GK	(Japan)	Ryotaro Hironaga	24	FC Tokyo	
MF	(South Korea)	Lee Dae-heon	21	V-Varen Nagasaki	Loan return
MF	(Japan)	Hironori Ishikawa	26	Vegalta Sendai	Loan return
MF	(South Korea)	Kim Jung-suk	20	Roasso Kumamoto	Loan return
MF	(Japan)	Sena Inami	22	V-Varen Nagasaki	Loan return

=== Out ===
Position	Nationality	Name	Age	To	Notes
MF	(Japan)	Yojiro Takahagi	28	Western Sydney Wanderers	
FW	(Japan)	Naoki Ishihara	30	Urawa Red Diamonds	
DF	(Japan)	Naoki Otani	19	Roasso Kumamoto	Loan
GK	(Japan)	Yutaro Hara	24	Roasso Kumamoto	
MF	(Japan)	Kohei Kudo	30	Matsumoto Yamaga FC	
DF	(South Korea)	Hwang Seok-ho	25	Kashima Antlers	
MF	(Japan)	Hayao Kawabe	19	Júbilo Iwata	Loan
MF	(South Korea)	Lee Dae-heon	21	Tochigi SC	Loan
DF	(South Korea)	Park Hyung-jin	21	Tochigi SC	Loan
MF	(Japan)	Hironori Ishikawa	26	Oita Trinita	Loan
MF	(South Korea)	Kim Jung-suk	20	Renofa Yamaguchi	Loan
MF	(Japan)	Sena Inami	22	Unattached	Released

== Players ==
=== First team squad ===
Updated 7 March 2016
Note: Flags indicate national team as defined under FIFA eligibility rules; some limited exceptions apply. Players may hold more than one non-FIFA nationality.

No.	Pos.	Nation	Player
1	GK	JPN	Takuto Hayashi
3	DF	KOR	Byeon Jun-Byum
4	DF	JPN	Hiroki Mizumoto
5	DF	JPN	Kazuhiko Chiba
6	MF	JPN	Toshihiro Aoyama
7	MF	JPN	Kōji Morisaki
8	MF	JPN	Kazuyuki Morisaki
9	FW	BRA	Douglas (on loan from Tokushima Vortis)
11	FW	JPN	Hisato Satō
13	GK	JPN	Takuya Masuda
14	MF	CRO	Mihael Mikić
16	MF	JPN	Satoru Yamagishi
18	MF	JPN	Yoshifumi Kashiwa
19	DF	JPN	Sho Sasaki

No.	Pos.	Nation	Player
22	FW	JPN	Yusuke Minagawa
24	MF	JPN	Gakuto Notsuda
25	MF	JPN	Yusuke Chajima
26	DF	JPN	Yasumasa Kawasaki
27	MF	JPN	Kohei Shimizu
28	MF	JPN	Takuya Marutani
29	FW	JPN	Takuma Asano
30	MF	JPN	Kosei Shibasaki
33	DF	JPN	Tsukasa Shiotani
34	MF	JPN	Soya Takahashi
35	DF	JPN	Naoki Otani
36	MF	JPN	Hayao Kawabe
37	DF	JPN	Kazuya Miyahara
38	DF	JPN	Kyohei Yoshino

== Competitions ==
=== Overall ===
Competition	Started round	Current position / round	Final position / round	First match	Last match
J1 League	—	—	Winners	7 March 2015	5 December 2015
Emperor's Cup	Second round	—	Semi-finals	5 September 2015	29 December 2015
J.League Cup	Group stage	—		28 March 2015	3 June 2015
FIFA Club World Cup	Play-off	—	Third-Place	10 December 2015	20 December 2015

Updated to match played 17 April 2016
Source: Competitions

=== Overview ===
Competition	Record							
Competition	G	W	D	L	GF	GA	GD	Win %
J1 League	36	24	6	6	77	33	+44	66.67
Emperor's Cup	5	4	0	1	13	5	+8	80.00
J.League Cup	6	2	3	1	9	6	+3	33.33
FIFA Club World Cup	4	3	0	1	7	2	+5	75.00
Total	51	33	9	9	106	46	+60	64.71

Updated to match played 4 March 2016
Source: Competitions

=== J1 League ===
==== First stage ====
Pos	Team	Pld	W	D	L	GF	GA	GD	Pts
2	FC Tokyo	17	11	2	4	24	18	+6	35
3	Sanfrecce Hiroshima	17	10	4	3	29	16	+13	34
4	Gamba Osaka	17	9	5	3	24	13	+11	32

Updated to match(es) played on 27 June 2015. Source: Meiji Yasuda J1 League Standings
Rules for classification: 1) Points; 2) Goal difference; 3) Goals scored

Win Draw Loss Upcoming fixture

7 March 2015 1	Sanfrecce Hiroshima	2–0	Ventforet Kofu	Hiroshima
12:00 JST	Satō 10'; Shiotani (yellow card) 35'; Douglas 87'	Report	Bruno Dybal (yellow card) 56'; Noda (yellow card) 73'; Inagaki (yellow card) 90'	Stadium: Hiroshima Big Arch; Attendance: 14,671; Referee: Minoru Tōjō

14 March 2015 2	Matsumoto Yamaga FC	1–2	Sanfrecce Hiroshima	Matsumoto
17:00 JST	Obina 12' (pen.); Kiyama (yellow card) 45+3'; Iida (yellow card) 90+3'	Report	Kashiwa 7'; Kazuyuki Morisaki (yellow card) 11'; Koji Morisaki 45+3'	Stadium: Matsumotodaira Football Stadium; Attendance: 17,091; Referee: Nobutsugu Murakami

22 March 2015 3	Sanfrecce Hiroshima	0–0	Urawa Red Diamonds	Hiroshima
12:00 JST	Aoyama (yellow card) 75'; Chiba (yellow card) 90'	Report	Lee (yellow card) 35'	Stadium: Hiroshima Big Arch; Attendance: 26,302; Referee: Hiroyuki Kimura

4 April 2015 4	Sanfrecce Hiroshima	0–1	Vissel Kobe	Hiroshima
16:30 JST		Report	Ogawa 35'	Stadium: Hiroshima Big Arch; Attendance: 11,577; Referee: Masaaki Toma

12 April 2015 5	Nagoya Grampus	2–0	Sanfrecce Hiroshima	Toyota
12:00 JST	Córdoba (yellow card) 19'; Kawamata 45+2'; Tanaka (yellow card) 60'; Yano 85'	Report		Stadium: Toyota Stadium; Attendance: 15,080; Referee: Ryuji Sato

18 April 2015 6	FC Tokyo	1–2	Sanfrecce Hiroshima	Chōfu, Tokyo
12:00 JST	Muto 1'	Report	Shibasaki 11'; Kazuyuki Morisaki (yellow card) 36'; Asano 82'	Stadium: Ajinomoto Stadium; Attendance: 24,369; Referee: Yudai Yamamoto

25 April 2015 7	Sanfrecce Hiroshima	2–0	Shimizu S-Pulse	Hiroshima
12:00 JST	Chiba 30'; Notsuda 80'	Report	Shirasaki (yellow card) 29'; Hiraoka (yellow card) 45+1'; Utaka (yellow card) 70'; Honda (yellow card) 78'	Stadium: Hiroshima Big Arch; Attendance: 11,653; Referee: Futoshi Nakamura

29 April 2015 8	Yokohama F. Marinos	1–2	Sanfrecce Hiroshima	Kōhoku-ku, Yokohama
17:00 JST	Ito 5'	Report	Douglas 26'; Satō 65'	Stadium: International Stadium Yokohama; Attendance: 19,284; Referee: (Australia) Jarred Gillett

2 May 2015 9	Sanfrecce Hiroshima	2–0	Vegalta Sendai	Hiroshima
14:00 JST	Notsuda 38'; Asano 78'	Report	Watanabe (yellow card) 25'; Okuno (yellow card) 45'	Stadium: Hiroshima Big Arch; Attendance: 15,566; Referee: Nobutsugu Murakami

6 May 2015 10	Kawasaki Frontale	0–1	Sanfrecce Hiroshima	Kawasaki
13:00 JST		Report	Douglas 2'; Aoyama (yellow card) 66'	Stadium: Kawasaki Todoroki Stadium; Attendance: 21,141; Referee: Kazuyoshi Enomoto

10 May 2015 11	Sanfrecce Hiroshima	0–1	Gamba Osaka	Hiroshima
17:00 JST	Shibasaki (yellow card) 5'	Report	Endō (yellow card) 31'; Lins 60'; Konno (yellow card) 73'	Stadium: Hiroshima Big Arch; Attendance: 17,372; Referee: Kenji Ogiya

16 May 2015 12	Kashima Antlers	2–2	Sanfrecce Hiroshima	Kashima
13:00 JST	Hwang Seok-ho (yellow card) 61'; Ogasawara 64'; Dinei 68'; Shoji (yellow card) 77'; Ito (yellow card) 90+2'	Report	Mizumoto (yellow card) 25'; Satō 51'; Shiotani (yellow card) 57'; Chiba (yellow card) 62'; Shibasaki 69'; Aoyama (yellow card) 73'	Stadium: Kashima Soccer Stadium; Attendance: 13,523; Referee: Hajime Matsuo

23 May 2015 13	Sanfrecce Hiroshima	4–2	Albirex Niigata	Hiroshima
17:00 JST	Shiotani 19', 80'; Douglas 37'; Marutani (yellow card) 61'; Asano 70'	Report	Yamazaki 45+1'; Maeno (yellow card) 51'; Tanaka 88'	Stadium: Hiroshima Big Arch; Attendance: 10,460; Referee: Itaru Hirose

30 May 2015 14	Shonan Bellmare	0–0	Sanfrecce Hiroshima	Hiratsuka
17:00 JST	Nagaki (yellow card) 26'; Otake (yellow card) 41'	Report	Aoyama (yellow card) 79'; Mikić (yellow card) 90+2'	Stadium: Shonan BMW Stadium Hiratsuka; Attendance: 11,276; Referee: Yudai Yamamoto

7 June 2015 15	Kashiwa Reysol	2–3	Sanfrecce Hiroshima	Kashiwa
14:00 JST	Cristiano 28'; Nakatani (yellow card) 62'; Otani 86'	Report	Satō 35'; Douglas 50'; Suzuki 88' (o.g.)	Stadium: Hitachi Kashiwa Soccer Stadium; Attendance: 11,352; Referee: Takuto Okabe

20 June 2015 16	Sanfrecce Hiroshima	5–1	Montedio Yamagata	Hiroshima
14:00 JST	Satō 26', 29', 35'; Shibasaki 39'; Notsuda 90+3'	Report	Nakashima 69'	Stadium: Hiroshima Big Arch; Attendance: 12,286; Referee: Hiroyuki Kimura

27 June 2015 17	Sagan Tosu	2–2	Sanfrecce Hiroshima	Tosu
17:00 JST	Toyoda 25', 90+6'; Fujita (yellow card) 51'	Report	Miyahara (yellow card) 49'; Aoyama 60'; Douglas 78' (pen.)	Stadium: Tosu Stadium; Attendance: 12,376; Referee: Minoru Tōjō

==== Second stage ====
Pos	Team	Pld	W	D	L	GF	GA	GD	Pts	Qualification
1	Sanfrecce Hiroshima (Q)	17	13	1	3	44	14	+30	40	Qualification to J.League Championship Stage
2	Kashima Antlers	17	12	1	4	30	16	+14	37	
3	Gamba Osaka	17	9	4	4	32	24	+8	31	

Updated to match(es) played on 22 November 2015. Source: Meiji Yasuda J1 League 2nd Stage Standings
Rules for classification: 1) Points; 2) Goal difference; 3) Goals scored
(Q) Qualified for the phase indicated

Win Draw Loss Upcoming fixture

11 July 2015 1	Vegalta Sendai	3–4	Sanfrecce Hiroshima	Sendai
16:00 JST	Kanazono 44'; Ramon Lopes 88'; Yamamoto 90+5'	Report	Satō 12', 45+2'; Miyahara 40'; Kashiwa 61'	Stadium: Sendai Stadium; Attendance: 13,523; Referee: Yuichi Nishimura

15 July 2015 2	Sanfrecce Hiroshima	6–0	Matsumoto Yamaga FC	Hiroshima
17:00 JST	Iida 3' (o.g.); Iwama 6' (o.g.); Kashiwa 19'; Douglas 69'; Shibasaki 75', 86'	Report		Stadium: Hiroshima Big Arch; Attendance: 7,966; Referee: Ryuji Sato

19 July 2015 3	Urawa Red Diamonds	1–2	Sanfrecce Hiroshima	Saitama
17:00 JST	Sekine 35'	Report	Asano 67'; Chiba (yellow card) 76'; Aoyama 84'	Stadium: Saitama Stadium 2002; Attendance: 41,492; Referee: Toshimitsu Yoshida

25 July 2015 4	Sanfrecce Hiroshima	2–0	Yokohama F. Marinos	Hiroshima
17:00 JST	Douglas 45+2' (pen.), 54' (yellow card) 68'	Report	Mikado (yellow card) 45+1'	Stadium: Hiroshima Big Arch; Attendance: 15,174; Referee: Yudai Yamamoto

29 July 2015 5	Vissel Kobe	0–4	Sanfrecce Hiroshima	Kobe
17:00 JST		Report	Douglas 15', 48'; Satō 24'; Notsuda 42' (pen.)	Stadium: Misaki Park Stadium; Attendance: 9,538; Referee: Jumpei Iida

12 August 2015 6	Sanfrecce Hiroshima	0–1	Kashima Antlers	Hiroshima
17:00 JST	Douglas (yellow card) 85'	Report	Yamamoto 32'; Nishi (yellow card) 33'; Endo (yellow card) 41'; Akasaki (yellow card) 71'	Stadium: Hiroshima Big Arch; Attendance: 16,689; Referee: Hiroyoshi Takayama

16 August 2015 7	Sanfrecce Hiroshima	0–3	Kashiwa Reysol	Hiroshima
17:00 JST		Report	Cristiano 3', 62', 77'; Barada (yellow card) 14'	Stadium: Hiroshima Big Arch; Attendance: 14,471; Referee: Masaaki Toma

22 August 2015 8	Albirex Niigata	0–2	Sanfrecce Hiroshima	Niigata
17:00 JST	Kawaguchi (yellow card) 63'	Report	Shiotani 60'; Shimizu (yellow card) 81'; Kazuyuki Morisaki 85'; Aoyama (yellow card) 89'	Stadium: Denka Big Swan Stadium; Attendance: 19,615; Referee: Hiromichi Oka

29 August 2015 9	Sanfrecce Hiroshima	5–2	Nagoya Grampus	Hiroshima
17:00 JST	Douglas 6', 52', 85'; Satō 9'; Asano 71'	Report	Isomura (yellow card) 42'; Yano (yellow card) 71'; Nagai 79' (yellow card) 81'; Muta 77'	Stadium: Hiroshima Big Arch; Attendance: 13,916; Referee: Kazuyoshi Enomoto

12 September 2015 10	Montedio Yamagata	1–3	Sanfrecce Hiroshima	Tendō
17:00 JST	Diego Souza 35'; Shohei Ogura (yellow card) 48'	Report	Mikić 39' (yellow card) 77'; Douglas 61'; Asano 79'	Stadium: ND Soft Stadium Yamagata; Attendance: 8,137; Referee: Takuto Okabe

19 September 2015 11	Sanfrecce Hiroshima	0–0	Sagan Tosu	Hiroshima
17:00 JST	Chiba (yellow card) 75'	Report	Fujita (yellow card) 90+4'; Kamada (yellow card) 90+4'	Stadium: Hiroshima Big Arch; Attendance: 18,625; Referee: Hiroyuki Kimura

26 September 2015 12	Shimizu S-Pulse	1–5	Sanfrecce Hiroshima	Shimizu
13:00 JST	Duke (yellow card) 22'; Kakuda (yellow card) 65'; Jong Tae-se 65'	Report	Douglas 19'; Mizumoto 24'; Mikić (yellow card) 63'; Asano 75', 80'Shiotani (yellow card) 90+2'; Kashiwa 90+4'	Stadium: IAI Stadium Nihondaira; Attendance: 13,053; Referee: Minoru Tōjō

3 October 2015 13	Sanfrecce Hiroshima	0–1	FC Tokyo	Hiroshima
17:00 JST		Report	Ota (yellow card) 35'; Takahashi (yellow card) 41'; Kawano 70'	Stadium: Hiroshima Big Arch; Attendance: 18,810; Referee: Toshimitsu Yoshida

17 October 2015 14	Sanfrecce Hiroshima	2–1	Kawasaki Frontale	Hiroshima
12:00 JST	Shibasaki 50'; Aoyama (yellow card) 61'; Yamagishi 90+3'	Report	Ōkubo 83'	Stadium: Hiroshima Big Arch; Attendance: 19,751; Referee: Futoshi Nakamura

24 October 2015 15	Ventforet Kofu	0–2	Sanfrecce Hiroshima	Kōfu
12:00 JST		Report	Douglas 15'; Shimizu 30'	Stadium: Yamanashi Chuo Bank Stadium; Attendance: 11,062; Referee: Kenji Ogiya

7 November 2015 16	Gamba Osaka	1–2	Sanfrecce Hiroshima	Osaka
12:00 JST	Kurata (yellow card) 26'; Yonekura (yellow card) 49'; Iwashita (yellow card) 54'; Patric (yellow card) 77' (red card) 90+1'	Report	Satō (yellow card) 33'; Douglas 55'; Shimizu 89'	Stadium: Osaka Expo '70 Stadium; Attendance: 17,435; Referee: Jumpei Iida

22 November 2015 17	Sanfrecce Hiroshima	5–0	Shonan Bellmare	Hiroshima
11:30 JST	Douglas 24', 72', 89'; Aoyama 25'; Satō 42'	Report		Stadium: Hiroshima Big Arch; Attendance: 33,210; Referee: Ryuji Sato

==== Overall placement ====
Pos	Team	Pld	W	D	L	GF	GA	GD	Pts	Qualification or relegation
1	Sanfrecce Hiroshima (C)	34	23	5	6	73	30	+43	74	Club World Cup, Champions League group stage and J.League Championship Final
2	Urawa Red Diamonds	34	21	9	4	69	40	+29	72	Champions League group stage and J.League Championship 1st Round
3	Gamba Osaka	34	18	9	7	56	37	+19	63	Champions League group stage and J.League Championship 1st Round
4	FC Tokyo	34	19	6	9	45	33	+12	63	Champions League qualifying play-off (Note: The winner of the 2015 Emperor's Cup qualified for the Group Stage of the 2016 AFC Champions League. Since the Emperor's Cup winner was Gamba Osaka who were the third-placed team, the qualifying play-off spot was awarded to the fourth-placed team.)
5	Kashima Antlers	34	18	5	11	57	41	+16	59	

Updated to match(es) played on 28 November 2015. Source: Meiji Yasuda J1 League Standings
Rules for classification: 1) Points; 2) Goal difference; 3) Goals scored
(C) Champions

==== Championship stage ====
Win Draw Loss Upcoming fixture

2 December 2015	Gamba Osaka	2 – 3	Sanfrecce Hiroshima	Osaka Expo '70 Stadium, Suita
19:30	Nagasawa 60'; Konno 82'	Report	Douglas 80'; Sasaki 90+1'; Kashiwa 90+6'	Attendance: 17,844; Referee: Kenji Ogiya

5 December 2015	Sanfrecce Hiroshima	1 – 1	Gamba Osaka	Hiroshima Big Arch, Hiroshima
19:30	Asano 76'	Report	Konno 28'	Attendance: 36,609; Referee: Yuichi Nishimura

=== Emperor's Cup ===
Win Draw Loss Upcoming fixture

5 September 2015 Second round	Sanfrecce Hiroshima	8 – 0	Hiroshima University of Economics	Fukuyama Takegahana Stadium, Fukuyama, Hiroshima
15:00				Attendance: 4,529

14 October 2015 Third round	Sanfrecce Hiroshima	1 – 0	Roasso Kumamoto	Hiroshima Big Arch, Hiroshima
19:01				Attendance: 3,179

11 November 2015 Fourth round	Tokushima Vortis	1 – 2	Sanfrecce Hiroshima	Pocarisweat Stadium, Naruto, Tokushima
19:00				Attendance: 3,154; Referee: Hiroyuki Kimura

26 December 2015 Quarter-finals	FC Tokyo	1 – 2 (a.e.t.)	Sanfrecce Hiroshima	Nagasaki Athletic Stadium, Isahaya, Nagasaki
15:00				Attendance: 9,933; Referee: Minoru Tōjō

29 December 2015 Semi-finals	Gamba Osaka	3 – 0	Sanfrecce Hiroshima	Yanmar Stadium Nagai, Osaka
15:05	Usami 7', 74'; Nagasawa 90+1'			Attendance: 17,027; Referee: Ryuji Sato

=== J.League Cup ===
Team	Pld	W	D	L	GF	GA	GD	Pts
FC Tokyo	6	3	3	0	8	4	+4	12
Albirex Niigata	6	3	2	1	9	4	+5	11
Sanfrecce Hiroshima	6	2	3	1	9	6	+3	9
Shonan Bellmare	6	2	3	1	5	5	0	9
Sagan Tosu	6	2	2	2	3	4	−1	8
Matsumoto Yamaga	6	1	1	4	8	13	−5	4
Ventforet Kofu	6	0	2	4	4	10	−6	2

Win Draw Loss Upcoming fixture

28 March 2015 1	Albirex Niigata	0–0	Sanfrecce Hiroshima	Niigata
12:00 JST	Cortez (yellow card) 61'; Yamazaki (yellow card) 78'; Léo Silva (yellow card) 81'; Kobayashi (yellow card) 84'	Report	Chiba (yellow card) 38'	Stadium: Denka Big Swan Stadium; Attendance: 12,049; Referee: Hiroyoshi Takayama

8 April 2015 2	Sanfrecce Hiroshima	2–2	Shonan Bellmare	Hiroshima
17:00 JST	Miyahara (yellow card) 15'; Asano 25', 90'	Report	Bruno Correa 14'; Kim Jong-pil (yellow card) 43' (yellow-red card) 50'; Kobayashi 45'; Hirose (yellow card) 75'	Stadium: Hiroshima Big Arch; Attendance: 4,684; Referee: Toshimitsu Yoshida

22 April 2015 3	Matsumoto Yamaga FC	2–4	Sanfrecce Hiroshima	Matsumoto
17:00 JST	Goto 4'; Obina (yellow card) 42'; Ishihara 50'; Shiina (yellow card) 87'	Report	Byeon Jun-Byum (yellow card) 24'; Sho Sasaki 26'; Notsuda 34', 41'; Asano 67'	Stadium: Matsumotodaira Football Stadium; Attendance: 8,468; Referee: Kenji Ogiya

20 May 2015 4	Sagan Tosu	1–0	Sanfrecce Hiroshima	Tosu
17:00 JST	Isozaki (yellow card) 4'; Yoshida 77'	Report	Byeon Jun-Byum (yellow card) 88'	Stadium: Tosu Stadium; Attendance: 5,316; Referee: Ryuji Sato

27 May 2015 5	Sanfrecce Hiroshima	1–1	FC Tokyo	Hiroshima
17:00 JST	Shimizu (yellow card) 57', (goal) 79'; Shiotani (yellow card) 90+2'	Report	Hayashi 90'	Stadium: Hiroshima Big Arch; Attendance: 6,701; Referee: Hiroyuki Kimura

3 June 2015 6	Sanfrecce Hiroshima	2–0	Ventforet Kofu	Hiroshima
17:00 JST	Asano 37'; Shimizu 84'	Report	Hosaka (yellow card) 75'	Stadium: Hiroshima Big Arch; Attendance: 5,730; Referee: Shoichiro Mikami

=== FIFA Club World Cup ===
Win Draw Loss Upcoming fixture

10 December 2015 Play-off	Sanfrecce Hiroshima (Japan)	2–0	(New Zealand) Auckland City	International Stadium Yokohama
19:45	Minagawa 9'; Shiotani 70'	Report		Attendance: 19,421; Referee: Sidi Alioum (Cameroon)

13 December 2015 Quarter-finals	TP Mazembe (Democratic Republic of the Congo)	0–3	(Japan) Sanfrecce Hiroshima	Nagai Stadium, Osaka
19:30		Report	Shiotani 44'; Chiba 56'; Asano 78'	Attendance: 23,609; Referee: Wilmar Roldán (Colombia)

16 December 2015 Semi-finals	Sanfrecce Hiroshima (Japan)	0–1	(Argentina) River Plate	Nagai Stadium, Osaka
19:30		Report	Alario 72'	Attendance: 20,133; Referee: Jonas Eriksson (Sweden)

20 December 2015 Third Place	Sanfrecce Hiroshima (Japan)	2–1	(China) Guangzhou Evergrande	International Stadium Yokohama
16:00	Douglas 70', 83'	Report	Paulinho 4'	Attendance: 47,968; Referee: Matt Conger (New Zealand)
