= 2012 Sanfrecce Hiroshima season =

Sanfrecce Hiroshima
2012 season
- Chairman: Yūichi Mototani
- Manager: Hajime Moriyasu
- J. League Division 1: 1st
- Emperor's Cup: Second Round
- J. League Cup: Group Stage
- Biggest win: 5–1 vs Sagan Tosu (9 June 2012)
- Biggest defeat: 3–0 vs Urawa Red Diamonds; 20 June 2012
Home colours	Away colours	Third colours

The 2012 Sanfrecce Hiroshima season was Sanfrecce Hiroshima's fourth consecutive season in J. League Division 1, and 42nd overall in the Japanese top flight. Sanfrecce Hiroshima are also competing in the 2012 Emperor's Cup and 2012 J. League Cup.

== Competitions ==
=== J. League ===
==== League table ====
Pos	Team	Pld	W	D	L	GF	GA	GD	Pts	Qualification or relegation
1	Sanfrecce Hiroshima (C)	34	19	7	8	63	34	+29	64	Qualification to 2012 Club World Cup and 2013 Champions League
2	Vegalta Sendai	34	15	12	7	59	43	+16	57	Qualification to 2013 Champions League (Note: The winners of the 2012 Emperor's Cup qualified for the group stage of the 2013 AFC Champions League.)
3	Urawa Red Diamonds	34	15	10	9	47	42	+5	55	Qualification to 2013 Champions League
4	Yokohama F. Marinos	34	13	14	7	44	33	+11	53	
5	Sagan Tosu	34	15	8	11	48	39	+9	53	
6	Kashiwa Reysol	34	15	7	12	57	52	+5	52	Qualification to 2013 Champions League
7	Nagoya Grampus	34	15	7	12	46	47	−1	52	
8	Kawasaki Frontale	34	14	8	12	51	50	+1	50	
9	Shimizu S-Pulse	34	14	7	13	39	40	−1	49	
10	FC Tokyo	34	14	6	14	47	44	+3	48	
11	Kashima Antlers	34	12	10	12	50	43	+7	46	
12	Júbilo Iwata	34	13	7	14	57	53	+4	46	
13	Omiya Ardija	34	11	11	12	38	45	−7	44	
14	Cerezo Osaka	34	11	9	14	47	53	−6	42	
15	Albirex Niigata	34	10	10	14	29	34	−5	40	
16	Vissel Kobe (R)	34	11	6	17	41	50	−9	39	Relegation to 2013 J.League Division 2
17	Gamba Osaka (R)	34	9	11	14	67	65	+2	38	Relegation to 2013 J.League Division 2
18	Consadole Sapporo (R)	34	4	2	28	25	88	−63	14	Relegation to 2013 J.League Division 2

Updated to match(es) played on 1 December 2012. Source: J.League Division 1
Rules for classification: 1) points; 2) goal difference; 3) number of goals scored.
(C) Champions; (R) Relegated

==== Matches ====
10 March 2012 1	Sanfrecce Hiroshima	1–0	Urawa Red Diamonds	Hiroshima Big Arch Stadium
Saturday 14:06	Sato 49'	Report		Attendance: 29,603; Referee: Matsuo

17 March 2012 2	Shimizu S-Pulse	2–1	Sanfrecce Hiroshima	OUTSOURCING Stadium Nihondaira
Saturday 15:04	Brosque 9'; Takagi 51'	Report	87' Chiba	Attendance: 13,231; Referee: Kimura

24 March 2012 3	Sanfrecce Hiroshima	2–0	Kashima Antlers	Hiroshima Big Arch
Saturday 13:04	Sato 25'; Osaki 71'	Report		Attendance: 14,349; Referee: Inoue

31 March 2012 4	F.C. Tokyo	0–1	Sanfrecce Hiroshima	Ajinomoto Stadium
Saturday		Report	Sato	Attendance: 16,229; Referee: Sato

7 April 2012 5	Sanfrecce Hiroshima	4–1	Gamba Osaka	Hiroshima Big Arch
Saturday 19:04	Sato 9', 32'; Hirashige 85', 88'	Report	48' Sato	Attendance: 12,318; Referee: Yamamoto

14 April 2012 6	Sagan Tosu	1–0	Sanfrecce Hiroshima	Best Amenity Stadium
Saturday 18:34		Report	Mizunuma 39'	Attendance: 9,735; Referee: Imamura

21 April 2012 7	Sanfrecce Hiroshima	1–1	Nagoya Grampus	Hiroshima Big Arch
Saturday	Moriwaki 90+4' (yellow card) 90+4'	Report	Tanaka 62'; Narazaki (yellow card) 67'	Attendance: 11,123; Referee: Tomoya Maeda

28 April 2012 8	Kawasaki Frontale	1–4	Sanfrecce Hiroshima	Todoroki Athletics Stadium
Saturday 16:00	Ito 33'	Summary	Yamagishi 15'; Ishihara 38'; Satō 47', 78'; Kazuyuki Morisaki (yellow card) 90+3'	Attendance: 19,895; Referee: Kazuhiko Matsumura

3 May 2012 9	Sanfrecce Hiroshima	0–1	Albirex Niigata	Hiroshima Big Arch
Thursday 17:00	Moriwaki (yellow card) 15'; Mikić (yellow card) 25'; Nakajima (yellow card) 60'; Takahagi (yellow card) 79'	Summary	Kikuchi 63'	Attendance: 17,826; Referee: Kenji Ogiya

6 May 2012 10	Kashiwa Reysol	2–5	Sanfrecce Hiroshima	Hitachi Kashiwa Soccer Stadium
Sunday 16:00	Tanaka 61'; Ricardo Lobo (yellow card) 64'; Masushima (yellow card) 75'; Jorge Wagner 78'	Report	Satō 10', 47'; Mizumoto (yellow card) 40'; Ishihara (yellow card) 58' (goal) 90', 90+3'; Takahagi 85'	Attendance: 12,875; Referee: Masaki Iemoto

12 May 2012 11	Sanfrecce Hiroshima	1–3	Yokohama F. Marinos	Hiroshima Big Arch
Saturday 16:00	Aoyama 6'	Report	Marquinhos 39'; Ono (yellow card) 43'; Saito (yellow card) 67' (goal) 79'; Tomisawa 83'	Attendance: 12,073; Referee: Hiroyuki Kimura

19 May 2012 12	Sanfrecce Hiroshima	3–2	Vissel Kobe	Hiroshima Big Arch
Saturday	Mizumoto 12'; Ishihara 84'; Moriwaki 90+1'	Report	Inoha (yellow card) 40'; Park Kang-Jo (yellow card) 43'; Nozawa 76'; Morioka 81'; Kitamoto (yellow card) 90+2'	Attendance: 12,613; Referee: Toshimitsu Yoshida

26 May 2012 13	Consadole Sapporo	1–3	Sanfrecce Hiroshima	Sapporo Dome
Saturday 13:00	Uchimura 50'; Nara (yellow card) 68'	Report	Satō 21'; Yamagishi 27'; Kōji Morisaki 83'	Attendance: 6,870; Referee: Jumpei Lida

16 June 2012 14	Cerezo Osaka	1–4	Sanfrecce Hiroshima	Kincho Stadium
19:00	Kim Jin-Hyeon (yellow card) 28'; Kakitani 40'; Yamaguchi (yellow card) 49'; Kempes (yellow card) 78'	Report	Takahagi 8'; Satō 64'; Aoyama (yellow card) 71'; Ishihara 76', 90'	Attendance: 11,538; Referee: (Japan) Futoshi Nakamura

23 June 2012 15	Sanfrecce Hiroshima	0–0	Omiya Ardija	Hiroshima Big Arch
18:30		Report		Attendance: 15,304; Referee: (Japan) Itaru Hirose

30 June 2012 16	Vegalta Sendai	2–2	Sanfrecce Hiroshima	Yurtec Stadium Sendai
18:30	Wilson 11', 79'; Kakuda (yellow card) 69'	Report	Satō 45+3'; Chiba (yellow card) 55'; Morisaki 65'	Attendance: 18,722; Referee: (Japan) Toshimmitsu Yoshida

7 July 2012 17	Sanfrecce Hiroshima	2–0	Jubilo Iwata	Hiroshima Big Arch
Saturday	Nakajima 77'; Morisaki 90+3'	Report	Fujita (yellow card) 51'; Kobayashi (yellow card) 62'	Attendance: 12,769; Referee: (Japan) Nobutsugu Murakami

14 July 2012 18	Sanfrecce Hiroshima	3–0	Kawasaki Frontale	Hiroshima Big Arch
20:00	Shimizu 2'; Satō 15', 19'	Report	Kobayashi (yellow card) 40'	Attendance: 11,585; Referee: (Japan) Yudai Yamamoto

28 July 2012 19	Kashima Antlers	2–2	Sanfrecce Hiroshima	Kashima Soccer Stadium
Saturday 19:30 JST	Osako 45+2', 75'; Aoki (yellow card) 65'	Report	Satō 39'; Moriwaki 48' (yellow card) 90+4'	Attendance: 15,496; Referee: (Japan) Jumpei Iida

4 August 2012 20	Sanfrecce Hiroshima	1–2	Shimizu S-Pulse	Hiroshima Big Arch
Saturday 20:00	Satō 3'	Report	Yoshida (yellow card) 8'; Lee Ki-Je (yellow card) 26' (yellow-red card) 56'; Takagi 81'; Omae 84'	Attendance: 16,448; Referee: (Japan) Masaaki Iemoto

11 August 2012 21	Omiya Ardija	1–2	Sanfrecce Hiroshima	NACK5 Stadium Omiya
Saturday 20:00	Ljubijankič 38' (pen.); Kanazawa (yellow card) 47'; Aoki (yellow card) 56'	Report	Kikuchi 24' (o.g.); Shimizu 49'	Attendance: 11,057

18 August 2012 22	Albirex Niigata	0–2	Sanfrecce Hiroshima	Tohoku Electric Power Big Swan Stadium
Saturday 20:00	Suzuki (yellow card) 82'; Yano (yellow card) 83'	Summary	Satō 26'; Ishihara 55'	Attendance: 32,014; Referee: (Japan) Yoshiro Imamura

25 August 2012 23	Sanfrecce Hiroshima	0–1	F.C. Tokyo	Hiroshima Big Arch
Saturday 20:00		Summary	Lucas Severino 46'	Attendance: 23,656; Referee: (Japan) Tomoya Maeda

1 September 2012 24	Jubilo Iwata	1–1	Sanfrecce Hiroshima	Yamaha Stadium
Saturday 20:00	Komano 34'; Fujita (yellow card) 63'; Suganuma (yellow card) 71'; Miyazaki (yellow card) 76'	Summary	Satō 20'; Hwang Seok-Ho (yellow card) 28'; Mizumoto (yellow card) 33'	Attendance: 11,115; Referee: (Japan) Minoru Tojo

15 September 2012 25	Sanfrecce Hiroshima	2–1	Vegalta Sendai	Hiroshima Big Arch
Saturday 20:00	Morisaki 48'; Chiba (yellow card) 65'; Takahagi 78'	Summary	Kamata (yellow card) 27'; Tomita (yellow card) 45+3'; Sakurai (yellow card) 46'; Akamine 70'; Sugai (yellow card) 81'	Attendance: 25,352; Referee: (Japan) Kenji Ogiya

22 September 2012 26	Nagoya Grampus	1–2	Sanfrecce Hiroshima	Toyota Stadium
Saturday 19:00	Taguchi (yellow card) 45+1'; Tanaka 50'; Tanaka (yellow card) 84'	Report	Shimizu 40'; Moriwaki 90+3'	Attendance: 15,870; Referee: (Japan) Hiroyoshi Takayama

29 September 2012 27	Sanfrecce Hiroshima	4–1	Sagan Tosu	Hiroshima Big Arch
Saturday 14:30	Morisaki (yellow card) 24' (goal) 58'; Shimizu 30' (yellow card) 37'; Satō 34' (pen.), 90+5'; Moriwaki (yellow card) 54'	Summary	Yeo Sung-Hye (yellow card) 12'; Isozaki (yellow card) 33'; Toyoda 90+2'	Attendance: 15,463; Referee: (Japan) Hajime Matsuo

6 October 2012 28	Yokohama F. Marinos	0–0	Sanfrecce Hiroshima	Nissan Stadium
Saturday	Kobayashi (yellow card) 39'	Summary	Mikić (yellow card) 75'	Attendance: 36,412; Referee: (Japan) Ryuji Sato

20 October 2012 29	Sanfrecce Hiroshima	1–2	Kashiwa Reysol	Hiroshima Big Arch
Saturday	Kōji Morisaki 52'	Summary	Kweon (yellow card) 21' (goal) 45+1'; An (yellow card) 81'; Masushima 90+4'	Attendance: 24,839; Referee: (Japan) Junpei Iida

27 October 2012 30	Gamba Osaka	1–1	Sanfrecce Hiroshima	Osaka Expo '70 Stadium
Saturday	Fujiharu (yellow card) 21'; Endō 56'; Futagawa (yellow card) 71'	Summary	Kazuyuki Morisaki 76'	Attendance: 17,617; Referee: (Japan) Toshimitsu Yoshida

7 November 2012 31	Sanfrecce Hiroshima	3–0	Consadole Sapporo	Hiroshima Big Arch
Wednesday	Koji Morisaki 17' (yellow card) 73'; Satō 31'; Mizumoto 86'	Summary	Kushibiki (yellow card) 16'; Yamamoto (yellow card) 50'	Attendance: 13,204; Referee: (Japan) Yudai Yamamoto

17 November 2012 32	Urawa Red Diamonds	2–0	Sanfrecce Hiroshima	Saitama Stadium 2002
Saturday	Márcio Richardes (yellow card) 23'; Umesaki 41'; Suzuki 61'; Tsuboi (yellow card) 77'; Makino (yellow card) 77'	Summary	Shimizu (yellow card) 7'; Moriwaki (yellow card) 49'; Chiba (yellow card) 82'; Mikić (yellow card) 87'; Hwang Seok-ho (yellow card) 90'	Attendance: 41,296; Referee: (Japan) Kenji Ogiya

24 November 2012 33	Sanfrecce Hiroshima	4–1	Cerezo Osaka	Hiroshima Big Arch
Saturday	Takahagi 17'; Aoyama 20'; Satō 42'; Ishikawa 50'; Shimizu (yellow card) 70'	Summary	Fujimoto (yellow card) 31'; Yamaguchi (red card) 40'; Edamura 61'	Attendance: 32,724; Referee: (Japan) Masaaki Toma

1 December 2012 34	Vissel Kobe	0–1	Sanfrecce Hiroshima	Home's Stadium Kobe
Saturday		Summary	Koji Morisaki 52'; Shimizu (yellow card) 61'	Attendance: 22,224; Referee: (Japan) Yuichi Nishimura

=== J. League Cup ===
Team	Pld	W	D	L	GF	GA	GD	Pts
Cerezo Osaka	6	4	0	2	15	7	+8	12
Vegalta Sendai	6	4	0	2	11	5	+6	12
Jubilo Iwata	6	4	0	2	10	11	−1	12
Urawa Red Diamonds	6	3	0	3	12	10	+2	9
Sagan Tosu	6	3	0	3	8	16	−8	9
Sanfrecce Hiroshima	6	1	1	4	8	11	−3	4
Kawasaki Frontale	6	1	1	4	7	11	−4	4

4 April 2012 Group A	Sanfrecce Hiroshima	1–1	Kawasaki Frontale	Hiroshima Big Arch
Wednesday 19:04	Sato 85'	Report	58' Jeci	Attendance: 6,413; Referee: Iida

18 April 2012 Group A	Júbilo Iwata	1–0	Sanfrecce Hiroshima	Yamaha Stadium
Wednesday 19:00	Kobayashi (yellow card) 19'; Abe (yellow card) 73'; Yamada 85'; Fujita (yellow card) 86'; Miyazaki (yellow card) 90+1'	Report	Shimizu (yellow card) 64'; Moriwaki (yellow card) 77'	Attendance: 6,372; Referee: Minoru Tojo

16 May 2012 Group A	Cerezo Osaka	2–1	Sanfrecce Hiroshima	Kincho Stadium
Wednesday 20:00	Branquinho 27'; Bando (yellow card) 45+2'; Ogihara (yellow card) 67'; Murata (yellow card) 81'; Kim Bo-Kyung 90+5' (pen.)	Report	Satō 30'; Aoyama (yellow card) 76'; Moriwaki (yellow card) 90+4'	Attendance: 6,397; Referee: Takuto Okabe

6 June 2012 Group A	Sanfrecce Hiroshima	1–3	Vegalta Sendai	Hiroshima Big Arch
Wednesday 20:00	Shimizu 24'	Report	Nakahara 56', 76'; Wilson 65'	Attendance: 7,234; Referee: Minoru Tojo

9 June 2012 Group A	Sanfrecce Hiroshima	5–1	Sagan Tosu	Hiroshima Big Arch
Saturday 17:00	Takahagi (yellow card) 9'; Shimizu (yellow card) 37'; Kōji Morisaki 45+3', 90'; Satō 55' (pen.); Ishihara 78', 82'	Report	Tozin (yellow card) 38'; Fujita (yellow card) 45+2'; Mizunuma 63'; Yeo Sung-Hye (yellow card) 80'	Attendance: 10,132; Referee: Nobutsugu Murakami

27 June 2012 Group A	Urawa Red Diamonds	3–0	Sanfrecce Hiroshima	Saitama Stadium 2002
Wednesday 20:00	Kojima (yellow card) 17'; Despotović 43' (yellow card) 90+2'; Noda 63'; Yajima 80'	Report	Shimizu (yellow card) 67'	Attendance: 14,022; Referee: (Japan) Koichiro Fukushima

=== Emperor's Cup ===
8 September 2012 Round 2	Sanfrecce Hiroshima	1–2	F.C. Imabari	Asaminami-ku, Hiroshima
15:00	Satō 74'	Summary	Morikawa 3'; Takada 86'	Stadium: Hiroshima Big Arch
