= Satoru Yamagishi =

Japanese footballer

Satoru Yamagishi 山岸 智
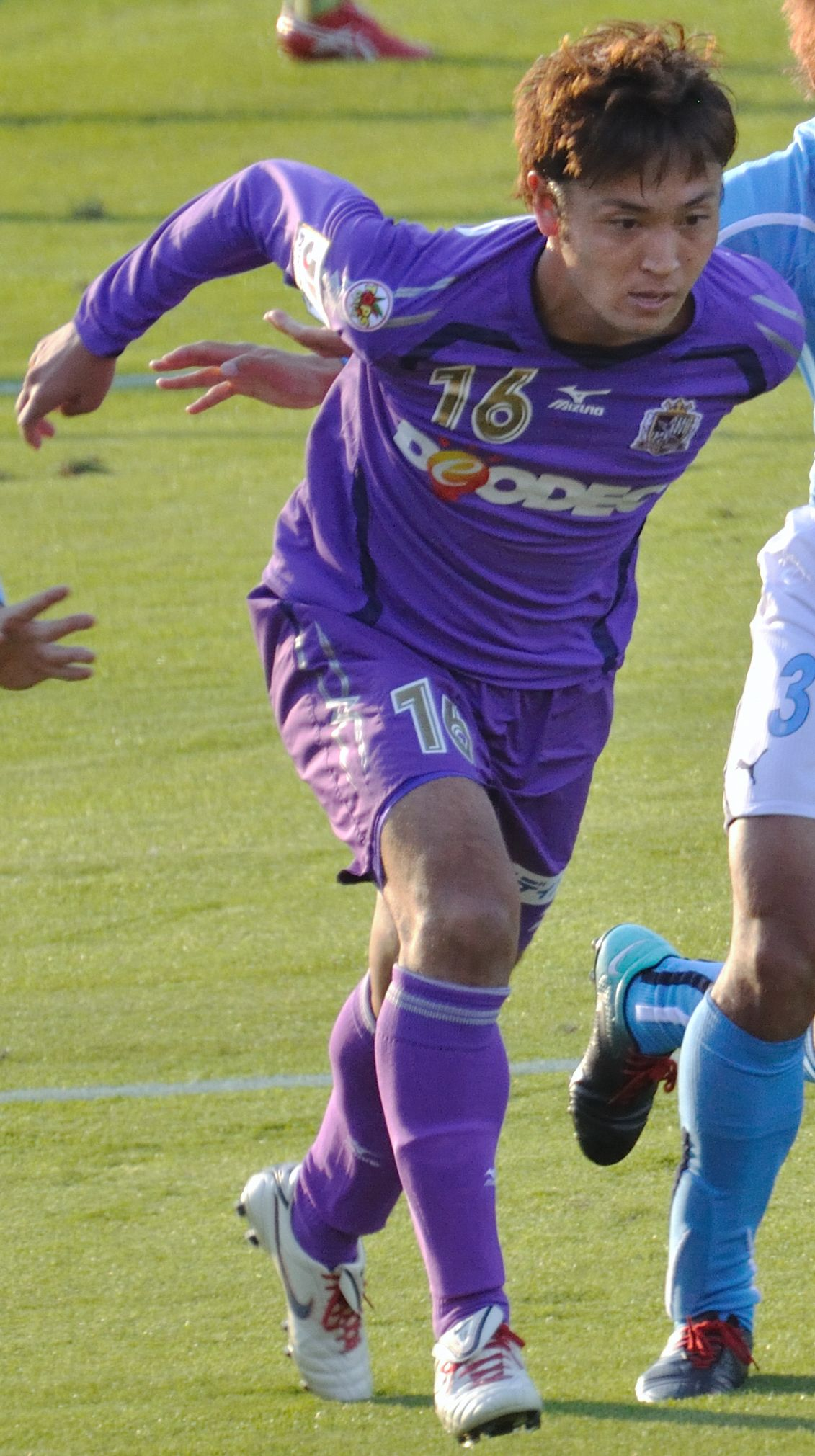
- Yamagishi with Sanfrecce Hiroshima in 2010

Personal information
- Full name: Satoru Yamagishi
- Date of birth: May 3, 1983 (age 43)
- Place of birth: Chiba, Chiba, Japan
- Height: 1.81 m (5 ft 11 in)
- Position: Midfielder

Youth career
- 1999–2001: JEF United Ichihara

Senior career*
Years	Team	Apps	(Gls)
2002–2007	JEF United Chiba	130	(20)
2008–2009	Kawasaki Frontale	45	(0)
2010–2015	Sanfrecce Hiroshima	115	(9)
2016–2017	Oita Trinita	44	(0)
2018–2020	Vonds Ichihara		
Total		334	(29)

International career
2003	Japan U-20	2	(0)
2006–2008	Japan	11	(0)
Medal record
JEF United Chiba
Winner	J.League Cup	2005
Winner	J.League Cup	2006
Kawasaki Frontale
Runner-up	J1 League	2008
Runner-up	J1 League	2009
Runner-up	J.League Cup	2009
Sanfrecce Hiroshima
Winner	J1 League	2012
Winner	J1 League	2013
Winner	J1 League	2015
Runner-up	J.League Cup	2010
Runner-up	J.League Cup	2014
Runner-up	Emperor's Cup	2013
- * Club domestic league appearances and goals as of 22 January 2021

Satoru Yamagishi (山岸 智, Yamagishi Satoru; born May 3, 1983) is a Japanese football player. He played for Japan national team.

== Club career ==
Yamagishi was born in Chiba on May 3, 1983. He joined JEF United Ichihara (later JEF United Chiba) from youth team in 2002. He debuted as right midfielder in 2003. From 2005, he became a regular player as left midfielder as Shinji Murai successor. The club won the champions 2005 and 2006 J.League Cup. He moved to Kawasaki Frontale in 2008. Although the club won the 2nd place in 2008 and 2009 J1 League, his opportunity to play decreased and he moved to Sanfrecce Hiroshima in 2010. The club won the champions 2012 and 2013 J1 League. His opportunity to play decreased from 2014. Although the club won the champions 2015 J1 League, he could hardly play in the match. He moved to J3 League club Oita Trinita in 2016. The club won the champions in 2016 and was promoted to J2 League. He moved to Regional Leagues club Vonds Ichihara.

== National team career ==
In November 2003, Yamagishi was selected Japan U-20 national team for 2003 World Youth Championship. He played 2 matches.

Yamagishi made his senior national team debut on October 4, 2006, in a friendly match against Ghana. He was a member of the Japan team for the 2007 Asian Cup finals. He played two games in the competition. He played 11 games for Japan until 2008.

== Club statistics ==
Club	Season	League		Emperor's Cup		J.League Cup		AFC		Other^{1}		Total	
Club	Season	Apps	Goals	Apps	Goals	Apps	Goals	Apps	Goals	Apps	Goals	Apps	Goals
JEF United Ichihara	2002	0	0	0	0	0	0	-		-		0	0
JEF United Ichihara	2003	20	2	0	0	3	0	-		-		23	2
JEF United Ichihara	2004	12	4	0	0	3	0	-		-		15	4
JEF United Chiba	2005	30	2	1	0	7	0	-		-		38	2
JEF United Chiba	2006	34	6	1	0	10	5	-		-		45	11
JEF United Chiba	2007	34	6	1	0	5	1	-		-		40	7
Kawasaki Frontale	2008	29	0	0	0	3	0	-		-		32	0
Kawasaki Frontale	2009	16	0	0	0	2	0	4	0	-		22	0
Sanfrecce Hiroshima	2010	24	3	1	0	2	2	6	0	-		33	5
Sanfrecce Hiroshima	2011	30	1	2	0	1	0	-		-		33	1
Sanfrecce Hiroshima	2012	16	2	0	0	0	0	3	1	-		19	3
Sanfrecce Hiroshima	2013	26	0	2	0	1	0	4	0	4	1	37	1
Sanfrecce Hiroshima	2014	15	2	1	0	4	0	5	1	1	0	26	3
Sanfrecce Hiroshima	2015	4	1	3	0	0	0	-		1	0	8	1
Oita Trinita	2016	18	0	1	0	-		-		-		19	0
Oita Trinita	2017	26	0	1	0	-		-		-		27	0
Career total		334	29	14	0	41	8	22	2	6	0	417	39

^{1}Includes Japanese Super Cup, FIFA Club World Cup and J.League Championship.

== National team statistics ==
Japan national team
Year	Apps	Goals
2006	3	0
2007	5	0
2008	3	0
Total	11	0

== National team career statistics ==
=== Appearances in major competitions ===
Year	Competition	Category	Appearances		Goals	Team record
Year	Competition	Category	Start	Sub	Goals	Team record
2003	2003 FIFA World Youth Championship	U-20	0	2	0	Quarter-finals
2006	2007 AFC Asian Cup qualification	Senior	1	1	0	Qualified
2007	2007 AFC Asian Cup	Senior	2	0	0	4th place

== Honors and awards ==
=== Individual ===
- J1 League Fair Player Award: 2006

=== JEF United Chiba ===
- J.League Cup (2): 2005, 2006

=== Sanfrecce Hiroshima ===
- J1 League (2): 2012, 2013, 2015
- Japanese Super Cup (2): 2013, 2014

=== Oita Trinita ===
- J3 League (1): 2016
