= Takuma Asano =

Japanese footballer (born 1994)

Takuma Asano 浅野 拓磨
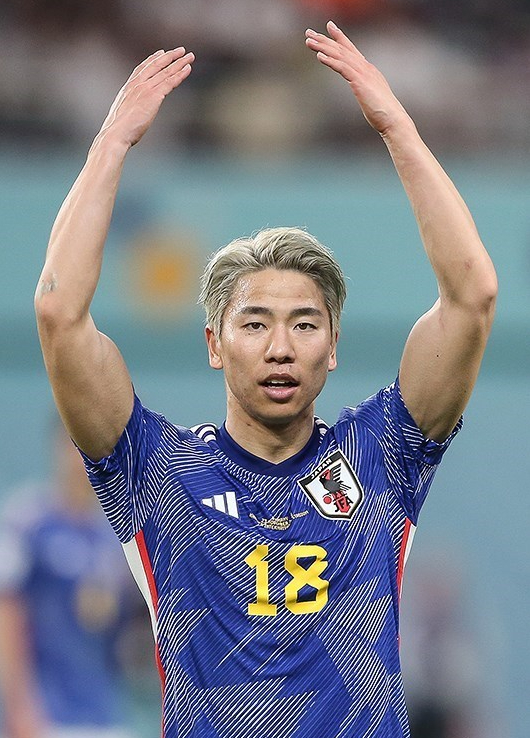
- Asano playing with Japan at the 2022 FIFA World Cup

Personal information
- Full name: Takuma Asano
- Date of birth: 10 November 1994 (age 32)
- Place of birth: Komono, Mie, Japan
- Height: 1.73 m (5 ft 8 in)
- Position: Forward

Team information
- Current team: Sanfrecce Hiroshima
- Number: 29

Youth career
- Perna SC
- 2007–2009: Happu Junior High School
- 2010–2012: Yokkaichi Chuo Kogyo High School

Senior career*
Years	Team	Apps	(Gls)
2013–2016	Sanfrecce Hiroshima	60	(13)
2014–2015	→ J.League U-22 (loan)	3	(0)
2016–2019	Arsenal	0	(0)
2016–2018	→ VfB Stuttgart (loan)	41	(5)
2018	→ VfB Stuttgart II (loan)	2	(1)
2018–2019	→ Hannover 96 (loan)	13	(0)
2019–2021	Partizan	56	(22)
2021–2024	VfL Bochum	83	(12)
2024–2026	Mallorca	41	(3)
2026–	Sanfrecce Hiroshima	5	(1)

International career^{‡}
2014–2016	Japan U23	14	(6)
2015–2024	Japan	53	(9)
Medal record
Men's football
Representing Japan
AFC U-23 Championship
Winner	2016 Qatar
- * Club domestic league appearances and goals as of 02:19, 4 November 2026 (UTC) ‡ National team caps and goals as of 10 September 2024

Takuma Asano (浅野 拓磨, Asano Takuma; born 10 November 1994) is a Japanese professional footballer who plays as a forward for J1 League club Sanfrecce Hiroshima.

== Club career ==
=== Sanfrecce Hiroshima ===
After attending Yokkaichi Chuo Kogyo High School, Asano joined Sanfrecce Hiroshima at the age of 18 in January 2013. He went on to win the J1 League in his debut season, making one appearance in the process.

Asano went on to win the Japanese Super Cup in 2014, while starting to break into the squad for the J1 League. He helped the side lift the league title for a second time in 2015, this time adding nine goals in 34 appearances. Due to his performances, Asano was named the J1 League Rookie of the Year.

=== Arsenal ===
On 3 July 2016, Asano was announced as Arsenal's second signing of the season, subject to a medical and international clearance. Manager Arsène Wenger described him as "a talented young striker and very much one for the future". However, Asano was refused a work permit to play in the Premier League.

==== Loan to VfB Stuttgart ====
On 26 August 2016, Asano was loaned out to VfB Stuttgart until the end of the season with an option for a further year. He made his debut in a 2–1 home loss to 1. FC Heidenheim two weeks later. On 9 April 2017, Asano scored a brace to give his side a 2–0 win over Karlsruher SC. He helped the team win the 2. Bundesliga and take promotion to the top flight.

On 22 June 2017, the loan deal with Stuttgart was extended for another season.

==== Loan to Hannover 96 ====
On 23 May 2018, Asano was sent on season-long loan to Bundesliga side Hannover 96.

=== Partizan ===
On 1 August 2019, Asano completed his move to Serbian club Partizan. He signed a three-year contract and was given the number 11 shirt, while becoming the first Japanese player in club history.

Asano scored on his debut in an eventual 3–1 home win over Turkish club Yeni Malatyaspor in the first leg of the Europa League third qualifying round. He entered the field at the beginning of the second half instead of Filip Stevanović and scored his first goal for the club in the 67th minute. Partizan eliminated Yeni Malatyaspor and then the Norwegian Molde, thus qualifying for the Group L of the Europa League, with Manchester United, AZ Alkmaar and Astana as their opponents. Asano played in all European matches for Partizan this season and was also the scorer in the draw with AZ in Alkmaar (2–2) and in the victory over Astana (4–1) in Belgrade. Partizan finished on second place in the Serbian SuperLiga, behind Red Star, and Asano scored four goals in 23 league games. He also appeared in four games in the Serbian Cup, scoring two goals, both in the quarter-final match against Radnik Surdulica. However, Partizan did not manage to win the trophy in the Cup, as they were defeated by Vojvodina in the final game after a penalty shoot-out.

In the 2020/21 season Partizan did not qualify for the group stage of the Europa League. After eliminating the Latvian RFS and the Romanian Sfîntul Gheorghe, the club was defeated by the Belgian Charleroi in the third round. Asano appeared in all three European matches (only played one match each due to the pandemic), did not score a goal but recorded an assist to Seydouba Soumah for the only goal in the 2–1 away defeat against Charleroi after extra time. Having scored 18 goals in 33 league matches for Partizan in the ongoing championship, Asano announced on 2 May 2021 that he had rescinded his contract with the club.

=== VfL Bochum ===
On 23 June 2021, VfL Bochum 1848 announced the club have signed Asano who was on free agent. Asano made his debut for The Blues on 14 August in the first game of the Bundesliga season in a 1–0 defeat against Wolfsburg. The Japanese international scored his first goal at the Ruhrstadion on January 22, 2022 in a 2–2 draw against FC Köln. On 2 April 2022 Asano played an excellent game scoring two goals in Bochum's 2–1 away win against Hoffenheim.

On 30 July 2022 Asano scored a goal in the first round of the 2022–23 DFB-Pokal in a 3–0 win against Viktoria Berlin. Takuma Asano netted his first Bundesliga goal since April as Bochum fire five past Hoffenheim. The dominant hosts made it three before the break as Asano chased through the Hoffenheim defence to slot past Baumann - with Antwi-Adjei providing his third assist of the game. In the final round of the 2022–23 Bundesliga season, Asano helped his team avoid relegation play-offs by scoring and providing an assist in a 3–0 victory over Bayer Leverkusen. Bochum thus finished the season in 14th position, two points ahead of 16th-placed VfB Stuttgart.

At the start of the 2023–24 Bundesliga, Takuma Asano scored twice in Bochum's 2–2 draw with FC Augsburg. The lightning-fast Asano scored in front of 27,422 spectators in first-half stoppage time to make it 1–1 and also scored in the 64th minute to make it 2–2. After 5 draws and 4 defeats, Takuma Asano scored twice against Darmstadt 98 to give Bochum their first win of the Bundesliga season. On February 18, 2024, Asano scored his seventh goal of the season, and first in seven career meetings with Bayern. He left Bochum at the end of the 2023–24 season.

=== Mallorca ===
On 6 July 2024, Asano joined Spanish side Mallorca by signing a two-year contract. Asano made his debut in the starting lineup on August 18, 2024 in a 1–1 draw against Real Madrid. On 28 June 2026, Mallorca announced that Takuma Asano had concluded his tenure with the club and would return to his former team, Sanfrecce Hiroshima.

== International career ==
=== Youth ===
At youth level, Asano won a gold medal at the 2016 AFC U-23 Championship, scoring a brace against South Korea to give his side a 3–2 win in the final. He also represented Japan at the 2016 Summer Olympics, netting two goals in the tournament, as the team exited in the group stage.

=== Senior ===
On 7 May 2015, Asano was invited by Japan manager Vahid Halilhodžić for a two-day training camp. He was subsequently called up to the team for the upcoming 2015 EAFF East Asian Cup. Asano scored his first goal for Samurai Blue in a 7–2 win over Bulgaria at the 2016 Kirin Cup.

In March 2018, manager Vahid Halilhodžić left out Asano and Yosuke Ideguchi for friendly matches with Mali and Ukraine in preparations for the 2018 World Cup due to lack of playing time at club level, commenting, "It makes me sad that Asano and Ideguchi are not playing. They were the heroes of our qualifying game against Australia. They haven't been chosen this time, and if things continue the way they are, there is a chance that they won't be chosen for the World Cup". In May, Asano was named in Japan's preliminary squad for the World Cup, but failed to make the final cut.

In his first match in the 2022 World Cup, Asano scored a goal in the 83rd minute to give Japan an upset victory over Germany.

== Career statistics ==
=== Club ===
As of match played 3 June 2026

Appearances and goals by club, season and competition
Club	Season	League			National cup		League cup		Continental		Other		Total	
Club	Season	Division	Apps	Goals	Apps	Goals	Apps	Goals	Apps	Goals	Apps	Goals	Apps	Goals
Sanfrecce Hiroshima	2013	J1 League	1	0	5	0	0	0	0	0	0	0	6	0
Sanfrecce Hiroshima	2014	J1 League	11	0	0	0	2	0	6 (Note: Appearances in AFC Champions League)	0	1 (Note: Appearance in Japanese Super Cup)	1	20	1
Sanfrecce Hiroshima	2015	J1 League	34	9	5	4	5	4	—		4 (Note: Appearances in FIFA Club World Cup)	1	48	18
Sanfrecce Hiroshima	2016	J1 League	14	4	0	0	0	0	4	3	1	1	19	8
Sanfrecce Hiroshima	Total		60	13	10	4	7	4	10	3	6	3	93	27
J.League U-22 (loan)	2014	J3 League	2	0	—		—		—		—		2	0
J.League U-22 (loan)	2015	J3 League	1	0	—		—		—		—		1	0
J.League U-22 (loan)	Total		3	0	—		—		—		—		3	0
VfB Stuttgart (loan)	2016–17	2. Bundesliga	26	4	1	0	—		—		—		27	4
VfB Stuttgart (loan)	2017–18	Bundesliga	15	1	3	0	—		—		—		18	1
VfB Stuttgart (loan)	Total		41	5	4	0	—		—		—		45	5
VfB Stuttgart II (loan)	2017–18	Regionalliga Südwest	2	1	—		—		—		—		2	1
Hannover 96 (loan)	2018–19	Bundesliga	13	0	2	1	—		—		—		15	1
Partizan	2019–20	Serbian SuperLiga	23	4	4	2	—		10 (Note: Appearances in UEFA Europa League)	3	—		37	9
Partizan	2020–21	Serbian SuperLiga	33	18	4	3	—		3	0	—		40	21
Partizan	Total		56	22	8	5	0	0	13	3	0	0	77	30
VfL Bochum	2021–22	Bundesliga	27	3	4	0	—		—		—		31	3
VfL Bochum	2022–23	Bundesliga	25	3	2	1	—		—		—		27	4
VfL Bochum	2023–24	Bundesliga	29	6	1	1	—		—		2 (Note: Appearances in Relegation Playoffs)	0	32	7
VfL Bochum	Total		81	12	7	2	—		—		2	0	89	14
RCD Mallorca	2024–25	La Liga	21	2	1	0	—		—		1 (Note: Appearance in Supercopa de España)	0	23	2
RCD Mallorca	2025–26	La Liga	20	1	3	0	—		—		—		23	1
RCD Mallorca	Total		41	3	4	0	—		—		1	0	46	3
Career total			298	56	35	12	7	4	23	6	9	3	371	81

=== International ===
As of match played 10 September 2024

Appearances and goals by national team and year
National team	Year	Apps	Goals
Japan	2015	3	0
Japan	2016	7	2
Japan	2017	7	1
Japan	2018	1	0
Japan	2019	2	1
Japan	2020	2	0
Japan	2021	10	2
Japan	2022	9	2
Japan	2023	7	1
Japan	2024	5	0
Total		53	9

Scores and results list Japan's goal tally first, score column indicates score after each Asano goal.

List of international goals scored by Takuma Asano
No.	Date	Venue	Opponent	Score	Result	Competition
1	3 June 2016	Toyota Stadium, Toyota, Japan	Bulgaria	7–2	7–2	2016 Kirin Cup
2	6 September 2016	Rajamangala Stadium, Bangkok, Thailand	Thailand	2–0	2–0	2018 FIFA World Cup qualification
3	31 August 2017	Saitama Stadium 2002, Saitama, Japan	Australia	1–0	2–0	2018 FIFA World Cup qualification
4	15 October 2019	Pamir Stadium, Dushanbe, Tajikistan	Tajikistan	3–0	3–0	2022 FIFA World Cup qualification
5	30 March 2021	Fukuda Denshi Arena, Chiba, Japan	Mongolia	12–0	14–0	2022 FIFA World Cup qualification
6	15 June 2021	Panasonic Stadium Suita, Suita, Japan	Kyrgyzstan	5–1	5–1	2022 FIFA World Cup qualification
7	2 June 2022	Sapporo Dome, Sapporo, Japan	Paraguay	1–0	4–1	2022 Kirin Challenge Cup
8	23 November 2022	Khalifa International Stadium, Al Rayyan, Qatar	Germany	2–1	2–1	2022 FIFA World Cup
9	9 September 2023	Volkswagen Arena, Wolfsburg, Germany	Germany	3–1	4–1	Friendly

== Honours ==
Sanfrecce Hiroshima

- J1 League: 2013, 2015
- Japanese Super Cup: 2013, 2014, 2016

VfB Stuttgart

- 2. Bundesliga: 2016–17

Japan U23

- AFC U-23 Championship: 2016

Individual

- J.League Rookie of the Year: 2015
- Japan Pro-Footballers Association awards: Best XI (2022)

== Personal life ==
Asano's younger brothers Yuya and Kaito are also professional footballers, with the former currently playing for J1 League side Nagoya Grampus and the latter currently plying his trade at Philippines Football League side Cebu.
