= Tsukasa Shiotani =

Japanese footballer (born 1988)

Tsukasa Shiotani 塩谷 司
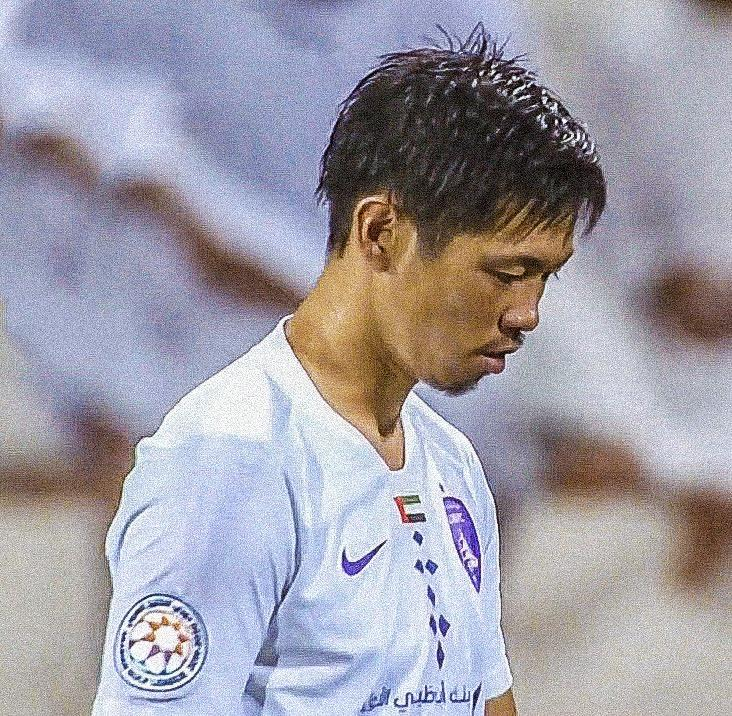
- Shiotani with Al Ain in 2019

Personal information
- Full name: Tsukasa Shiotani
- Date of birth: 5 December 1988 (age 37)
- Place of birth: Komatsushima, Tokushima, Japan
- Height: 1.80 m (5 ft 11 in)
- Positions: Centre-back; defensive midfielder

Team information
- Current team: Sanfrecce Hiroshima
- Number: 3

Youth career
- 1996–1999: Minami-Komatsushima FC
- 1999–2001: Omatsu SC
- 2001–2003: Otsuka FC
- 2004–2006: Tokushima Shogyo High School

College career
Years	Team	Apps	(Gls)
2007–2010	Kokushikan University		

Senior career*
Years	Team	Apps	(Gls)
2011–2012	Mito HollyHock	60	(5)
2012–2017	Sanfrecce Hiroshima	140	(17)
2017–2021	Al Ain	88	(11)
2021–	Sanfrecce Hiroshima	150	(6)

International career^{‡}
2016	Japan Olympic (O.P.)	3	(0)
2014–2019	Japan	7	(1)
Medal record
Sanfrecce Hiroshima
Winner	J1 League	2012
Winner	J1 League	2013
Winner	J1 League	2015
Runner-up	J.League Cup	2014
Runner-up	Emperor's Cup	2013
Representing Japan
AFC Asian Cup
Silver medal – second place	2019 United Arab Emirates
- * Club domestic league appearances and goals as of 9 August 2026 ‡ National team caps and goals as of 1 February 2019

Tsukasa Shiotani (塩谷 司, Shiotani Tsukasa; born 5 December 1988) is a Japanese professional footballer who plays as a centre-back for Sanfrecce Hiroshima.

Shiotani has won 8 trophies as of 2025 and was selected for the J.League Team of the Year from 2014 to 2016.

== Club career ==
=== Sanfreece Hiroshima ===
On 23 December 2015, Shiotani was selected in the 2015 J.League Best XI.

=== Al Ain ===
On 15 June 2017, Shiotani was announced at Al Ain on a permanent transfer.

During the final of the 2018 FIFA Club World Cup, Shiotani scored in the 86th minute against Real Madrid as Al Ain finished runners-up.

=== Second spell at Sanfreece Hiroshima ===
On 1 October 2021, Shiotani was announced at Sanfreece Hiroshima on a permanent transfer. He was part of the Sanfeece Hiroshima team that won the 2022 J.League Cup.

Shiotani was part of the Sanfreece Hiroshima team that won the 2025 Japanese Super Cup.

== International career ==
On 15 December 2014, Shiotani was called up to the Japan squad for the 2015 AFC Asian Cup.

On 1 July 2016, Shiotani was called up to the Japan U-23 national team as one of three over-aged players for the 2016 Summer Olympics. At this tournament, he played the full 90 minutes in all three matches in a centre back partnership with Naomichi Ueda.

On 13 December 2018, Shiotani was called up to the Japan squad for the 2019 AFC Asian Cup. He scored his first international goal against Uzbekistan during the competition, scoring in the 58th minute on 17 January 2019. The stadium which he scored his first international goal is also the home stadium of Al Ain. He started in the final as Japan lost to Qatar.

== Club statistics ==
Updated to 3 December 2023.

Club	Season	League			Cuo		League Cup		Continental		Other^{1}		Total	
Club	Season	Division	Apps	Goals	Apps	Goals	Apps	Goals	Apps	Goals	Apps	Goals	Apps	Goals
Mito HollyHock	2011	J. League Division 2	35	3	3	0	-		-		-		38	3
Mito HollyHock	2012	J. League Division 2	25	2	0	0	-		-		-		25	2
Mito HollyHock	Total		60	5	3	0	-		-		-		63	5
Sanfrecce Hiroshima	2012	J. League Division 1	3	0	1	0	0	0	–		1	0	5	0
Sanfrecce Hiroshima	2013	J. League Division 1	34	3	6	1	2	0	6	0	1	0	49	4
Sanfrecce Hiroshima	2014	J. League Division 1	32	6	3	1	3	0	8	2	1	0	47	9
Sanfrecce Hiroshima	2015	J1 League	27	3	2	0	4	0	–		6	2	39	5
Sanfrecce Hiroshima	2016	J1 League	30	5	2	0	0	0	4	0	1	0	37	5
Sanfrecce Hiroshima	2017	J1 League	14	0	0	0	2	0	–		–		16	0
Sanfrecce Hiroshima	Total		140	17	14	2	11	0	18	2	10	2	193	23
Al Ain	2017–18	UAE Pro League	18	3	3	0	2	0	11	1	–		34	4
Al Ain	2018–19	UAE Pro League	26	4	1	0	6	1	5	1	5	2	43	8
Al Ain	2019–20	UAE Pro League	19	2	3	0	7	0	7	0	–		36	2
Al Ain	2020–21	UAE Pro League	25	2	1	0	2	0	1	0	–		29	2
Al Ain	Total		88	11	8	0	17	1	24	2	5	2	142	16
Sanfrecce Hiroshima	2021	J1 League	5	1	–		–		–		–		5	1
Sanfrecce Hiroshima	2022	J1 League	26	0	5	1	8	1	–		–		39	2
Sanfrecce Hiroshima	2023	J1 League	27	2	0	0	2	0	–		–		29	2
Sanfrecce Hiroshima	Total		58	3	5	1	10	1	–		–		73	5
Career total			346	36	30	3	38	2	42	4	15	4	471	49

^{1}Includes FIFA Club World Cup, J. League Championship and Japanese Super Cup.

== National team statistics ==
Japan national team
Year	Apps	Goals
2014	2	0
2015	0	0
2016	0	0
2017	0	0
2018	0	0
2019	5	1
Total	7	1

=== International goals ===
Scores and results list Japan's goal tally first.

No.	Date	Venue	Opponent	Score	Result	Competition
1.	17 January 2019	Khalifa bin Zayed Stadium, Al Ain, United Arab Emirates	Uzbekistan	2–1	2–1	2019 AFC Asian Cup

== Honours ==
Sanfrecce Hiroshima

- J. League Division 1: 2012, 2013, 2015
- J.League Cup: 2022, 2025
- Japanese Super Cup: 2013, 2014, 2016, 2025

Japan

- AFC Asian Cup runner-up: 2019

Individual

- J. League Best Eleven: 2014, 2015, 2016
- J1 100 Year Vision League Regional Round West Best Eleven: 2026
