= Toshihiro Aoyama =

Japanese footballer

Toshihiro Aoyama 青山 敏弘
Personal information
- Full name: Toshihiro Aoyama
- Date of birth: 22 February 1986 (age 40)
- Place of birth: Kurashiki, Okayama, Japan
- Height: 1.73 m (5 ft 8 in)
- Position: Defensive midfielder

Youth career
- 1992–1998: Kawatetsu SS
- 1998–2000: Hajaxs FC
- 2001–2003: Sakuyo High School

Senior career*
Years	Team	Apps	(Gls)
2004–2024	Sanfrecce Hiroshima	480	(24)

International career^{‡}
2013–2019	Japan	12	(1)
Medal record
Sanfrecce Hiroshima
Winner	J1 League	2012
Winner	J1 League	2013
Winner	J1 League	2015
Runner-up	J1 League	2018
Runner-up	J.League Cup	2010
Runner-up	J.League Cup	2014
Runner-up	Emperor's Cup	2007
Runner-up	Emperor's Cup	2013
Representing Japan
AFC Asian Cup
Silver medal – second place	2019 United Arab Emirates
- * Club domestic league appearances and goals as of 8 December 2024, 16:22 (UTC) ‡ National team caps and goals as of 17 January 2019

Toshihiro Aoyama (青山 敏弘, Aoyama Toshihiro; born 22 February 1986) is a former Japanese professional footballer who plays as a defensive midfielder.

== Career ==
Aoyama was born in Kurashiki. After featuring in 2014 FIFA World Cup, in May 2018 he was named in the Japan national team's preliminary squad for the 2018 FIFA World Cup in Russia. However, he got injured and he did not make the final cut.

On 20 October 2024, Aoyama announcement officially retirement from football after 21 years play in Sanfrecce Hiroshima.

== Career statistics ==
=== Club ===
As of the end 2024 season.

Appearances and goals by club, season and competition
Club	Season	League			Emperor's Cup		J.League Cup		AFC		Other (Note: Includes Japanese Super Cup, J.League Championship and FIFA Club World Cup.)		Total	
Club	Season	Division	Apps	Goals	Apps	Goals	Apps	Goals	Apps	Goals	Apps	Goals	Apps	Goals
Sanfrecce Hiroshima	2004	J1 League	0	0	0	0	1	1	–		–		1	1
Sanfrecce Hiroshima	2005	J1 League	0	0	0	0	0	0	–		–		0	0
Sanfrecce Hiroshima	2006	J1 League	19	1	1	1	1	0	–		–		21	2
Sanfrecce Hiroshima	2007	J1 League	28	0	1	1	6	0	–		–		35	1
Sanfrecce Hiroshima	2008	J2 League	36	4	4	1	–		–		–		40	5
Sanfrecce Hiroshima	2009	J1 League	29	3	0	0	5	1	–		–		34	4
Sanfrecce Hiroshima	2010	J1 League	23	0	1	0	5	0	0	0	–		29	0
Sanfrecce Hiroshima	2011	J1 League	27	2	2	0	1	0	–		–		30	2
Sanfrecce Hiroshima	2012	J1 League	34	2	0	0	4	0	–		–		38	2
Sanfrecce Hiroshima	2013	J1 League	33	3	4	0	2	0	3	0	4	1	46	4
Sanfrecce Hiroshima	2014	J1 League	25	1	1	0	5	0	8	0	1	0	40	1
Sanfrecce Hiroshima	2015	J1 League	33	3	3	1	2	0	–		6	0	39	3
Sanfrecce Hiroshima	2016	J1 League	28	2	2	0	2	0	4	0	1	0	37	2
Sanfrecce Hiroshima	2017	J1 League	31	0	1	0	4	0	–		–		36	0
Sanfrecce Hiroshima	2018	J1 League	34	1	2	0	0	0	–		–		36	1
Sanfrecce Hiroshima	2019	J1 League	14	0	3	0	2	0	0	0	–		19	0
Sanfrecce Hiroshima	2020	J1 League	31	1	0	0	1	0	–		–		32	1
Sanfrecce Hiroshima	2021	J1 League	32	1	0	0	1	0	–		–		33	1
Sanfrecce Hiroshima	2022	J1 League	15	0	2	0	8	0	–		–		25	0
Sanfrecce Hiroshima	2023	J1 League	5	0	1	0	2	0	–				8	0
Sanfrecce Hiroshima	2024	J1 League	3	0	2	1	1	0	2	0	–		8	1
Career total			480	24	31	5	54	2	17	0	12	1	593	32

=== International ===
Appearances and goals by national team and year
National team	Year	Apps	Goals
Japan	2013	3	0
Japan	2014	4	0
Japan	2015	1	1
Japan	2016	0	0
Japan	2017	0	0
Japan	2018	3	0
Japan	2019	1	0
Total		12	1

Scores and results list Japan's goal tally first, score column indicates score after each Aoyama goal.

List of international goals scored by Toshihiro Aoyama
No.	Date	Venue	Opponent	Score	Result	Competition	Ref.
1	31 March 2015	Ajinomoto Stadium, Chōfu, Japan	Uzbekistan	1–0	5–1	Friendly	Japan vs. Uzbekistan - 31 March 2015 - Soccerway

== Honours ==
Sanfrecce Hiroshima

- J1 League: 2012, 2013, 2015
- J2 League: 2008
- J.League Cup: 2022
- Japanese Super Cup: 2008, 2013, 2014, 2016

Japan

- EAFF East Asian Cup: 2013
- AFC Asian Cup runner-up: 2019

Individual

- J.League MVP Award: 2015
- J.League Best XI: 2012, 2013, 2015
