= Yutaro Hara =

Japanese footballer (born 1990)

Yutaro Hara 原 裕太郎
Personal information
- Full name: Yutaro Hara
- Date of birth: 23 April 1990 (age 36)
- Place of birth: Hikawa, Shimane, Japan
- Height: 1.87 m (6 ft 2 in)
- Position: Goalkeeper

Team information
- Current team: Ehime FC
- Number: 22

Youth career
- 2003–2008: Sanfrecce Hiroshima Youth

Senior career*
Years	Team	Apps	(Gls)
2009–2014	Sanfrecce Hiroshima	2	(0)
2015–2016	Roasso Kumamoto	11	(0)
2016	→ Ehime FC (loan)	0	(0)
2017–	Ehime FC	0	(0)
Medal record
Sanfrecce Hiroshima
Winner	J1 League	2012
Winner	J1 League	2013
Runner-up	J.League Cup	2010
Runner-up	J.League Cup	2014
Runner-up	Emperor's Cup	2013
Representing Japan
AFC U-16 Championship
Gold medal – first place	2006 Singapore
- * Club domestic league appearances and goals as of 1 January 2019

Yutaro Hara (原 裕太郎, Hara Yūtarō; born 23 April 1990 in Hikawa, Shimane) is a Japanese footballer. He currently plays for Roasso Kumamoto.

== National team career ==
In August 2007, Hara was elected Japan U-17 national team for 2007 U-17 World Cup. But he did not play in the match, as he was the team's reserve goalkeeper behind Ryotaro Hironaga.

== Club statistics ==
Updated to 23 February 2018.

Club performance			League		Cup		League Cup		Continental		Other^{1}		Total	
Season	Club	League	Apps	Goals	Apps	Goals	Apps	Goals	Apps	Goals	Apps	Goals	Apps	Goals
Japan			League		Emperor's Cup		J. League Cup		AFC		Other		Total	
2009	Sanfrecce Hiroshima	J1 League	1	0	0	0	1	0	–		–		2	0
2010	Sanfrecce Hiroshima	J1 League	0	0	0	0	0	0	0	0	–		0	0
2011	Sanfrecce Hiroshima	J1 League	0	0	0	0	0	0	–		–		0	0
2012	Sanfrecce Hiroshima	J1 League	0	0	0	0	0	0	–		–		0	0
2013	Sanfrecce Hiroshima	J1 League	1	0	0	0	0	0	0	0	0	0	1	0
2014	Sanfrecce Hiroshima	J1 League	0	0	0	0	0	0	0	0	0	0	0	0
2015	Roasso Kumamoto	J2 League	11	0	0	0	–		–		–		11	0
2016	Roasso Kumamoto	J2 League	0	0	0	0	–		–		–		0	0
2016	Ehime FC	J2 League	0	0	1	0	–		–		–		1	0
2017	Ehime FC	J2 League	0	0	0	0	–		–		–		0	0
Career total			13	0	1	0	1	0	0	0	0	0	15	0

^{1}Includes Japanese Super Cup and FIFA Club World Cup.
