= 2013 Japanese Super Cup =

Sanfrecce Hiroshima	Kashiwa Reysol
1	0
- Date: 23 February 2013
- Venue: National Olympic Stadium, Tokyo
- Referee: Minoru Tōjō
- Attendance: 34,972

The 2013 Japanese Super Cup was held on 23 February 2013 between the 2012 J. League champions Sanfrecce Hiroshima and the 2012 Emperor's Cup winner Kashiwa Reysol. Sanfrecce Hiroshima won the match 1–0 after a Hisato Satō goal.

== Match ==
23 February 2013
13:35 JST

Sanfrecce Hiroshima	1–0	Kashiwa Reysol
Satō 29'	Summary

National Olympic Stadium, Tokyo
Attendance: 34,972
Referee: (Japan) Minoru Tōjō

Sanfrecce Hiroshima	Kashiwa Reysol

Sanfrecce Hiroshima (3–5–1–1):
GK	1	(Japan) Shusaku Nishikawa
DF	4	(Japan) Hiroki Mizumoto
DF	5	(Japan) Kazuhiko Chiba
DF	33	(Japan) Tsukasa Shiotani
MF	6	(Japan) Toshihiro Aoyama	(yellow card) 57'
MF	7	(Japan) Kōji Morisaki
MF	8	(Japan) Kazuyuki Morisaki
MF	10	(Japan) Yojiro Takahagi
MF	22	(Japan) Tsubasa Yokotake
AM	20	(Japan) Hironori Ishikawa		(substituted off) 74'
CF	11	(Japan) Hisato Satō	29'	(substituted off) 60'
Substitutes:
CF	9	(Japan) Naoki Ishihara		(substituted on) 60'
GK	13	(Japan) Takuya Masuda
MF	15	(Japan) Tomotaka Okamoto
MF	16	(Japan) Satoru Yamagishi		(substituted on) 74'
DF	17	(South Korea) Hyung-Jin Park
MF	19	(South Korea) Lee Dae-Heon
MF	35	(Japan) Koji Nakajima
Manager:
(Japan) Hajime Moriyasu

Kashiwa Reysol (4–4–2):
GK	21	(Japan) Takanori Sugeno
DF	3	(Japan) Naoya Kondo	(yellow card) 19'
DF	4	(Japan) Daisuke Suzuki
DF	5	(Japan) Tatsuya Masushima
DF	27	(South Korea) Kim Chang-Soo
MF	7	(Japan) Hidekazu Otani
MF	10	(Brazil) Leandro Domingues	(yellow card) 64'
MF	15	(Brazil) Jorge Wagner		(substituted off) 79'
MF	20	(Japan) Akimi Barada		(substituted off) 58'
CF	9	(Japan) Masato Kudo
CF	11	(Brazil) Cléo		(substituted off) 79'
Substitutes:
GK	1	(Japan) Kazushige Kirihata
DF	14	(Japan) Kenta Kano
MF	18	(Japan) Junya Tanaka		(substituted on) 79'
DF	23	(Japan) Hirofumi Watanabe
MF	28	(Japan) Ryoichi Kurisawa		(substituted on) 58'
MF	29	(Japan) Hiroyuki Taniguchi
CF	30	(Japan) Ryosuke Yamanaka	(yellow card) 85'	(substituted on) 79'
Manager:
(Brazil) Nelsinho Baptista

Man of the Match:

Assistant referees:
(Japan) Shinji Ochi
(Japan) Tomokazu Tajiri
Fourth official:

== See also ==
- 2012 J. League Division 1
- 2012 Emperor's Cup
