= Lee Dae-heon =

South Korean footballer

Personal information
- Date of birth: 17 November 1993 (age 32)
- Place of birth: Samcheok, South Korea
- Height: 1.85 m (6 ft 1 in)
- Position: Midfielder

Senior career*
Years	Team	Apps	(Gls)
2012–2013	Sanfrecce Hiroshima	0	(0)
2014	V-Varen Nagasaki	13	(0)
2015	Tochigi SC	9	(0)
- * Club domestic league appearances and goals as of 30 March 2014

- Lee Dae-heon
- Hangul: 이대헌
- RR: I Daeheon
- MR: I Taehŏn

Lee Dae-heon (born 17 November 1993) is a South Korean professional footballer.

== Career ==
=== Sanfrecce Hiroshima ===
Born in Samcheok, Lee Dae-heon signed for Sanfrecce Hiroshima of the J1 League in January 2012. Lee Dae-Heon then made his professional debut for Hiroshima in the AFC Champions League on 13 March 2013 against Beijing Guoan at the Workers Stadium in Beijing. He came on as a 68th-minute substitute for Kohei Shimizu as Sanfrecce Hiroshima lost the match 2–1.

==== V-Varen Nagasaki (loan) ====
On 3 January 2014 it was announced that Lee Dae-heon had been loaned out to J2 League side V-Varen Nagasaki. He then made his debut for the club on 8 March 2014 against Shonan Bellmare. He came on as a 78th-minute substitute for Hiroshi Azuma as V-Varen Nagasaki lost the match 3–0.

== Club statistics ==
As of 30 March 2014

Club	Season	League			J.League Cup		Emperor's Cup		AFC		Total	
Club	Season	Division	Apps	Goals	Apps	Goals	Apps	Goals	Apps	Goals	Apps	Goals
Sanfrecce Hiroshima	2012	J1 League	0	0	0	0	0	0	3	0	3	0
Sanfrecce Hiroshima	2013	J1 League	0	0	0	0	0	0	3	0	3	0
V-Varen Nagasaki	2014	J2 League	1	0	0	0	0	0	—	—	1	0
Career total			1	0	0	0	0	0	3	0	4	0
