= Gakuto Notsuda =

Japanese footballer (born 1994)

Gakuto Notsuda 野津田 岳人
Personal information
- Full name: Gakuto Notsuda
- Date of birth: 6 June 1994 (age 32)
- Place of birth: Hiroshima, Japan
- Height: 1.77 m (5 ft 10 in)
- Position: Midfielder

Team information
- Current team: Persib Bandung
- Number: 17

Youth career
- Seagull Hiroshima
- 2007–2012: Sanfrecce Hiroshima

Senior career*
Years	Team	Apps	(Gls)
2012–2024	Sanfrecce Hiroshima	156	(13)
2014–2015	→ J. League U-22 (loan)	4	(1)
2016	→ Albirex Niigata (loan)	18	(2)
2017	→ Shimizu S-Pulse (loan)	11	(0)
2017–2018	→ Vegalta Sendai (loan)	35	(5)
2021	→ Ventforet Kofu (loan)	41	(2)
2024–2026	BG Pathum United	51	(4)
2026–	Persib Bandung	0	(0)

International career
2012–2013	Japan U-19	3	(0)
2022	Japan	1	(0)
Medal record
Men's football
Representing Japan
EAFF Championship
Winner	2022 Japan	Team
- * Club domestic league appearances and goals as of 10 May 2026

Gakuto Notsuda (野津田 岳人, Notsuda Gakuto; born 6 June 1994) is a Japanese football player who plays as a midfielder for Super League club Persib Bandung.

== International career ==
Gakuto got called up to the senior Japan squad for the 2022 EAFF E-1 Football Championship. On 24 July 2022, he make his international debut against China playing the entire 90 minute. He helped Japan to win the tournament at the Toyota Stadium.

== Club statistics ==
As of match played 5 November 2022

Club	Season	League			Emperor's Cup		League Cup		AFC		Other^{1}		Total	
Club	Season	Division	Apps	Goals	Apps	Goals	Apps	Goals	Apps	Goals	Apps	Goals	Apps	Goals
Sanfrecce Hiroshima	2012	J1 League	5	0	0	0	2	0	–		–		7	0
Sanfrecce Hiroshima	2013	J1 League	20	4	4	0	1	0	5	0	–		30	4
Sanfrecce Hiroshima	2014	J1 League	18	2	2	2	2	1	8	1	1	1	31	7
Sanfrecce Hiroshima	2015	J1 League	19	4	3	2	5	2	3	0	0	0	24	6
Albirex Niigata (loan)	2016	J1 League	18	2	1	0	1	0	–		–		20	2
Shimizu S-Pulse (loan)	2017	J1 League	11	0	0	0	4	0	–		–		15	0
Vegalta Sendai (loan)	2017	J1 League	12	3	–		–		–		–		12	3
Vegalta Sendai (loan)	2018	J1 League	23	2	4	1	5	0	–		–		32	3
Sanfrecce Hiroshima	2019	J1 League	17	0	2	0	1	0	7	0	-		27	0
Sanfrecce Hiroshima	2020	J1 League	8	0	–		1	0	–		–		9	0
Ventforet Kofu (loan)	2021	J2 League	41	2	1	0	–		–		–		42	2
Sanfrecce Hiroshima	2022	J1 League	28	3	6	0	9	1	-		-		43	4
Career total			220	22	23	5	31	4	23	1	1	1	298	33

^{1}Includes Japanese Super Cup and FIFA Club World Cup.

== Honours ==
=== Club ===
Sanfrecce Hiroshima

- J. League Division 1 (3) : 2012, 2013, 2015
- J.League Cup (1) : 2022
- Japanese Super Cup (2) : 2013, 2014

Persib Bandung

- Piala Presiden runner-up: 2026

=== International ===
- EAFF E-1 Football Championship: 2022
