= Kohei Shimizu =

Japanese footballer

Kohei Shimizu 清水 航平
Personal information
- Full name: Kohei Shimizu
- Date of birth: 30 April 1989 (age 37)
- Place of birth: Munakata, Fukuoka, Japan
- Height: 1.68 m (5 ft 6 in)
- Position: Winger

Youth career
- 2005–2007: Tokai Univ. Daigo High School

Senior career*
Years	Team	Apps	(Gls)
2008–2017	Sanfrecce Hiroshima	132	(7)
2017	→ Shimizu S-Pulse (loan)	9	(0)
2018–2019	Shimizu S-Pulse	0	(0)
2018	→ Ventforet Kofu (loan)	9	(0)
2019	→ Sanfrecce Hiroshima (loan)	14	(0)
2020–2021	Sanfrecce Hiroshima	3	(0)
- * Club domestic league appearances and goals as of 21:24, 9 January 2021 (UTC)

Kohei Shimizu (清水 航平, Shimizu Kōhei; born 30 April 1989) is a former Japanese professional footballer who played as a winger.

== Career statistics ==
=== Club ===
Updated to 22 February 2019.

Appearances and goals by club, season and competition
Club	Season	League		Cup^{1}		League Cup^{2}		Continental^{3}		Other^{4}		Total	
Club	Season	Apps	Goals	Apps	Goals	Apps	Goals	Apps	Goals	Apps	Goals	Apps	Goals
Sanfrecce Hiroshima	2008	4	1	0	0	–		–		–		4	1
Sanfrecce Hiroshima	2009	1	0	0	0	2	0	–		–		3	0
Sanfrecce Hiroshima	2010	4	0	1	0	0	0	3	0	–		8	0
Sanfrecce Hiroshima	2011	0	0	0	0	1	0	–		–		1	0
Sanfrecce Hiroshima	2012	24	4	1	0	5	1	–		–		30	5
Sanfrecce Hiroshima	2013	19	0	5	0	2	0	2	0	4	0	32	0
Sanfrecce Hiroshima	2014	21	0	2	1	4	0	1	0	1	0	29	1
Sanfrecce Hiroshima	2015	16	2	5	0	6	2	–		5	0	32	4
Sanfrecce Hiroshima	2016	31	0	2	0	2	0	6	1	0	0	41	1
Sanfrecce Hiroshima	2017	12	0	2	0	4	0	–		–		18	0
Shimizu S-Pulse	2017	9	0	0	0	–		–		–		9	0
Shimizu S-Pulse	2018	0	0	0	0	2	0	–		–		2	0
Ventforet Kofu	2018	9	0	0	0	–		–		–		9	0
Total		150	7	18	1	28	3	12	1	10	0	218	12

^{1}Includes Emperor's Cup.

^{2}Includes J. League Cup.

^{3}Includes AFC Champions League.

^{4}Includes FIFA Club World Cup, Japanese Super Cup and J. League Championship.

== Honours ==
=== Club ===
Sanfrecce Hiroshima

- J1 League (3) : 2012, 2013, 2015
- J2 League (1) : 2008
- Japanese Super Cup (4) : 2008, 2013, 2014, 2016
