= 2014 J.League Cup =

Yamazaki Nabisco Cup

Tournament details
- Country: Japan
- Teams: 18

Final positions
- Champions: Gamba Osaka (2nd title)
- Runners-up: Sanfrecce Hiroshima

Tournament statistics
- Matches played: 55
- Goals scored: 169 (3.07 per match)
- Top goal scorer: Cristiano (6 goals)

The 2014 J.League Cup, also known as the 2014 J.League Yamazaki Nabisco Cup for sponsoring purposes, was the 39th edition of the most prestigious Japanese soccer league cup tournament and the 22nd edition under the current J.League Cup format.

== Format ==
Teams from the J.League Division 1 took part in the tournament. Cerezo Osaka, Sanfrecce Hiroshima, Yokohama F. Marinos and Kawasaki Frontale were given a bye to the quarter-finals due to qualification in the 2014 AFC Champions League. The remaining 14 teams started from the group stage, where they were divided into two groups of seven. The group winners and the runners-up of each group qualified for the quarter-final along with the four teams which qualified for the AFC Champions League.

== Group stage ==
=== Standings ===
==== Group A ====
Team	Pld	W	D	L	GF	GA	GD	Pts
Gamba Osaka	6	4	0	2	9	4	+5	12
Vissel Kobe	6	4	0	2	10	9	+1	12
Sagan Tosu	6	3	0	3	9	8	+1	9
Kashima Antlers	6	3	0	3	10	10	0	9
Shimizu S-Pulse	6	3	0	3	9	9	0	9
FC Tokyo	6	2	1	3	10	10	0	7
Vegalta Sendai	6	1	1	4	4	11	-7	4

==== Group B ====
Team	Pld	W	D	L	GF	GA	GD	Pts
Urawa Red Diamonds	6	5	0	1	15	9	+6	15
Kashiwa Reysol	6	3	2	1	11	5	+6	11
Ventforet Kofu	6	3	1	2	10	5	+5	10
Nagoya Grampus	6	3	1	2	10	10	0	10
Albirex Niigata	6	2	2	2	7	8	-1	8
Omiya Ardija	6	0	3	3	3	9	-6	3
Tokushima Vortis	6	0	1	5	8	18	-10	1

=== Results ===
All times are JST (UTC+9)

==== Group A ====
19 March 2014
Wednesday 19:03

Gamba Osaka	2–0	Vissel Kobe
Lins 47'; A. Sato 53'	Report

Osaka Expo '70 Stadium, Suita
Attendance: 8,378
Referee: Hajime Matsuo
19 March 2014
Wednesday 19:00

FC Tokyo	3–1	Kashima Antlers
Kawano 8'; Ota 10'; Mita 71'	Report	Motoyama 72'

Ajinomoto Stadium, Chōfu
Attendance: 10,353
Referee: Nobutsugu Murakami
19 March 2014
Wednesday 19:03

Shimizu S-Pulse	4–0	Vegalta Sendai
Nagasawa 21'; Omae 32'; Novaković 68', 74'	Report

Outsourcing Stadium Nihondaira, Shizuoka
Attendance: 5,291
Referee: Toshimitsu Yoshida

2 April 2014
Wednesday 19:03

Vegalta Sendai	1–1	FC Tokyo
Kamata 62'		Edu 77' (pen.)

Yurtec Stadium Sendai, Sendai
Attendance: 7,094
Referee: Coote David
2 April 2014
Wednesday 19:00

Kashima Antlers	3–1	Sagan Tosu
Davi 38'; Umebachi 83'; Luís Alberto 87'		Hayasaka 22'

Kashima Soccer Stadium, Kashima
Attendance: 6,966
Referee: Yuichi Nishimura
2 April 2014
Wednesday 19:04

Shimizu S-Pulse	1–0	Gamba Osaka
Nagasawa 33'

IAI Stadium Nihondaira, Shizuoka
Attendance: 8,033
Referee: Minoru Tojo

16 April 2014
Wednesday 19:04

Vegalta Sendai	1–2	Kashima Antlers
Muto 60'		Nozawa 41'; Akasaki 83'

Yurtec Stadium Sendai, Sendai
Attendance: 7,583
Referee: Takuya Maeda
16 April 2014
Wednesday 19:04

Vissel Kobe	0–3	FC Tokyo
		Muto 35'; Edu 48'; Hirayama 89'

Noevir Stadium Kobe, Hyōgo-ku, Kobe
Attendance: 6,455
Referee: Yudai Yamamoto
16 April 2014
Wednesday 19:00

Sagan Tosu	0–2	Gamba Osaka
		Omori 34'; Ogawa 73'

Best Amenity Stadium, Tosu
Attendance: 4,972
Referee: Yoshiro Imamura

21 May 2014
Wednesday 19:00

FC Tokyo	2–3	Shimizu S-Pulse
Edu 18', 87'		T. Takagi 8'; Omae 21'; Novaković 57'

Ajinomoto Stadium, Chofu, Tokyo
Attendance: 8,749
Referee: Kazuyoshi Enomoto
21 May 2014
Wednesday 19:03

Gamba Osaka	2–1	Kashima Antlers
Kurata 4'; Yonekura 80'		Davi 72'

Osaka Expo '70 Stadium, Suita
Attendance: 8,103
Referee: Yoshiro Imamura
21 May 2014
Wednesday 19:04

Vissel Kobe	3–2	Sagan Tosu
Matsumura 42'; Marquinhos 54'; Morioka 90+3'		Bando 89', 90+4'

Noevir Stadium Kobe, Hyōgo-ku, Kobe
Attendance: 3,850
Referee: Takuto Okabe

24 May 2014
Saturday 14:04

Shimizu S-Pulse	1–2	Vissel Kobe
Novaković 63'		Jung Woo-young 33'; Iwanami 87'

IAI Stadium Nihondaira, Shimizu-ku, Shizuoka
Attendance: 11,815
Referee: Itaru Hirose
24 May 2014
Saturday 15:00

Sagan Tosu	2–0	Vegalta Sendai
Taniguchi 32' (pen.); Kiyotake 57'

Saga Athletic Stadium, Saga
Attendance: 4,097
Referee: Futoshi Nakamura
24 May 2014
Saturday 16:04

Gamba Osaka	3–1	FC Tokyo
Usami 16', 53'; Nishino 68'		Tokunaga 33'

Osaka Expo '70 Stadium, Suita
Attendance: 12,818
Referee: Raczkowski Pawel

28 May 2014
Wednesday 19:03

Vegalta Sendai	1–0	Gamba Osaka
Akamine 66'

Yurtec Stadium Sendai, Sendai
Attendance: 7,965
Referee: Hiroyuki Kimura
28 May 2014
Wednesday 19:00

Kashima Antlers	0–3	Vissel Kobe
		Sugiura 9'; Oya 57'; Hashimoto 75'

Kashima Soccer Stadium, Kashima
Attendance: 6,054
Referee: Hajime Matsuo
28 May 2014
Wednesday 19:00

Sagan Tosu	2–0	Shimizu S-Pulse
Toyoda 39'; Mizunuma 76'

Saga Athletic Stadium, Saga
Attendance: 5,231
Referee: Koichiro Fukushima

1 June 2014
Sunday 15:00

Kashima Antlers	3–0	Shimizu S-Pulse
Doi 16'; Akasaki 26'; Endo 90+3'

Kashima Soccer Stadium, Kashima
Attendance: 10,667
Referee: Kenji Ogiya
1 June 2014
Sunday 15:00

FC Tokyo	0–2	Sagan Tosu
		Yasuda 44'; Ikeda 57'

Ajinomoto Stadium, Chofu, Tokyo
Attendance: 12,600
Referee: Masaaki Ikemoto
1 June 2014
Sunday 15:00

Vissel Kobe	2–1	Vegalta Sendai
Morioka 1'; Pedro Jùnior 90+3'		Fujimura 37'

Noevir Stadium Kobe, Hyōgo-ku, Kobe
Attendance: 11,044
Referee: Nobutsugu Murakami

==== Group B ====
19 March 2014
Wednesday 19:01

Tokushima Vortis	1–3	Albirex Niigata
Douglas 87'	Report	Suzuki 16', 24'; Tanaka 73'

Pocarisweat Stadium, Naruto
Attendance: 4,234
Referee: Hiroyoshi Takayama
19 March 2014
Wednesday 19:04

Nagoya Grampus	0–1	Ventforet Kofu
	Report	Cristiano 30'

Mizuho Athletic Stadium, Nagoya
Attendance: 4,772
Referee: Koichiro Fukushima
19 March 2014
Wednesday 19:04

Kashiwa Reysol	2–1	Urawa Red Diamonds
Tanaka 43' (pen.); Watanabe 79'	Report	Umesaki 17'

Hitachi Kashiwa Soccer Stadium, Kashiwa
Attendance: 9,585
Referee: Takuto Okabe

2 April 2014
Wednesday 19:03

Ventforet Kofu	1–1	Kashiwa Reysol
Cristiano 84'		Leandro Domingues 3'

Yamanashi Chuo Bank Stadium, Kōfu, Yamanashi
Attendance: 6,174
Referee: Yosuke Kubota
2 April 2014
Wednesday 19:00

Albirex Niigata	3–3	Nagoya Grampus
Kim Jin-Su 17'; Tanaka 29'; Koizumi 89'		Tulio 49'; Yada 51'; Ogawa 60'

Denka Big Swan Stadium, Niigata
Attendance: 8,505
Referee: Kazuyoshi Enomoto
2 April 2014
Wednesday 19:31

Urawa Red Diamonds	2–1	Omiya Ardija
Lee 16'; Aoki 87'		Hashimoto 30'

Saitama Stadium 2002, Saitama
Attendance: 20,697
Referee: Tierney Paul

16 April 2014
Wednesday 19:02

Omiya Ardija	1–1	Kashiwa Reysol
Hashimoto 37'		Hashimoto 55'

Nack5 Stadium Omiya, Ōmiya-ku, Saitama
Attendance: 5,082
Referee: Kenji Ogiya
16 April 2014
Wednesday 19:00

Albirex Niigata	1–0	Ventforet Kofu
Suzuki 90+3'

Denka Big Swan Stadium, Niigata
Attendance: 7,765
Referee: Masaaki Iemoto
16 April 2014
Wednesday 19:30

Urawa Red Diamonds	4–3	Tokushima Vortis
Sakano 32'; Yajima 50'; Kinoshita 85' (o.g.); Hamada 90+1'		Kubota 19'; Kogure 61'; Douglas 68'

Saitama Stadium 2002, Saitama
Attendance: 16,294
Referee: Nobutsugu Murakami

21 May 2014
Wednesday 19:02

Omiya Ardija	0–2	Nagoya Grampus
		Tanaka 61'; Yano 83'

Nack5 Stadium Omiya, Ōmiya-ku, Saitama
Attendance: 4,681
Referee: Hiroyoshi Takayama
21 May 2014
Wednesday 19:04

Kashiwa Reysol	3–0	Albirex Niigata
Tanaka 9'; Barada 34'; Watanabe 58'

Hitachi Kashiwa Soccer Stadium, Kashiwa
Attendance: 5,517
Referee: Koichiro Fukushima
21 May 2014
Wednesday 19:01

Tokushima Vortis	1–4	Ventforet Kofu
Osaki 25' (pen.)		Mizuno 5', 45+3'; Cristiano 20'; Fukuda 90'

Pocarisweat Stadium, Naruto, Tokushima
Attendance: 3,574
Referee: Yosuke Kubota

24 May 2014
Saturday 14:03

Ventforet Kofu	3–0	Omiya Ardija
Cristiano 34', 44'; Kawamoto 90+2'

Yamanashi Chuo Bank Stadium, Kōfu
Attendance: 7,534
Referee: Hiroyuki Kimura
24 May 2014
Saturday 14:01

Albirex Niigata	0–1	Urawa Red Diamonds
		Ono 88' (o.g.)

Denka Big Swan Stadium, Niigata
Attendance: 15,965
Referee: Toshimitsu Yoshida
24 May 2014
Saturday 15:04

Nagoya Grampus	2–1	Tokushima Vortis
Tamada 28'; Ogawa 47'		Kim Jong-min 26'

Toyota Stadium, Toyota, Aichi
Attendance: 11,579
Referee: Akihiko Ikeuchi

28 May 2014
Wednesday 19:03

Ventforet Kofu	1–2	Urawa Red Diamonds
Cristiano 53'		Nasu 8'; Umesaki 74'

Yamanashi Chuo Bank Stadium, Kōfu, Yamanashi
Attendance: 9,074
Referee: Takuto Okabe
28 May 2014
Wednesday 19:04

Nagoya Grampus	1–0	Kashiwa Reysol
Tulio 85'

Mizuho Athletic Stadium, Nagoya
Attendance: 5,941
Referee: Kenji Ogiya
28 May 2014
Wednesday 19:01

Tokushima Vortis	1–1	Omiya Ardija
Hamada 52'		Kikuchi 85'

Pocarisweat Stadium, Naruto
Attendance: 3,956
Referee: Ryuji Sato

1 June 2014
Sunday 15:00

Urawa Red Diamonds	5–2	Nagoya Grampus
Kashiwagi 18'; Lee 40', 76'; Makino 60'; Sekiguchi 88'		Nagai 23'; Matsuda 72'

Saitama Stadium 2002, Saitama
Attendance: 33,837
Referee: Junpei Iida
1 June 2014
Sunday 15:00

Omiya Ardija	0–0	Albirex Niigata

Nack5 Stadium Omiya, Ōmiya-ku, Saitama
Attendance: 7,902
Referee: Yosuke Kubota
1 June 2014
Sunday 15:00

Kashiwa Reysol	4–1	Tokushima Vortis
Tanaka 40' (pen.); Kudo 45', 54'; Leandro 67'		Osaki 83'

Hitachi Kashiwa Soccer Stadium, Kashiwa
Attendance: 7,554
Referee: Kazuyoshi Enomoto

== Knock-out stage ==
All times are Japan Standard Time (UTC+9)

Quarterfinals
Urawa Red Diamonds	0	2	2
Sanfrecce Hiroshima	0	2	2
Kashiwa Reysol	2	3	5
Yokohama F. Marinos	1	1	2
Kawasaki Frontale	3	2	5
Cerezo Osaka	1	3	4
Gamba Osaka	1	3	4
Vissel Kobe	1	0	1

Semifinals
Sanfrecce Hiroshima	2	1	3
Kashiwa Reysol	0	2	2
Kawasaki Frontale	1	3	4
Gamba Osaka	3	2	5

Finals
Sanfrecce Hiroshima	2
Gamba Osaka	3

=== Quarter-finals ===
==== First leg ====
3 September 2014
19:04

Sanfrecce Hiroshima	0–0	Urawa Red Diamonds

EDION Stadium Hiroshima
Attendance: 6,718
Referee: Yudai Yamamoto

3 September 2014
19:30

Yokohama F. Marinos	1–2	Kashiwa Reysol
Nakamachi 65'		Leandro 63'; Kudo 74'

Nippatsu Mitsuzawa Stadium
Attendance: 6,237
Referee: Junpei Iida

3 September 2014
19:04

Cerezo Osaka	1–3	Kawasaki Frontale
Minamino 33'		Oshima 7'; Moriya 67'; Renato 71' (pen.)

Yanmar Stadium Nagai
Attendance: 5,734
Referee: Hiroyoshi Takayama

3 September 2014
19:04

Vissel Kobe	1–1	Gamba Osaka
Marquinhos 64'		Usami 11'

Kobe Universiade Memorial Stadium
Attendance: 13,653
Referee: Nobutsugu Murakami

==== Second leg ====
7 September 2014
18:00

Urawa Red Diamonds	2–2	Sanfrecce Hiroshima
Abe 34'; Makino 71'		Notsuda 39'; Sato 48'

Saitama Stadium 2002
Attendance: 17,645
Referee: Yoshiro Imamura

2-2 on aggregate. Sanfrecce Hiroshima won on away goals

7 September 2014
19:03

Kashiwa Reysol	3–1	Yokohama F. Marinos
Kudo 31'; Leandro 64'; Eduardo 82'		Nakazawa 23'

Hitachi Kashiwa Soccer Stadium
Attendance: 8,087
Referee: Minoru Tojo

Kashiwa Reysol won 5–2 on aggregate.

7 September 2014
19:03

Kawasaki Frontale	2–3	Cerezo Osaka
Renato 35'; Ōkubo 58'		Hasegawa 37', 75'; Minamino 90+1'

Todoroki Athletics Stadium
Attendance: 11,168
Referee: Nobutsugu Murakami

Kawasaki Frontale won 5–4 on aggregate.

7 September 2014
18:03

Gamba Osaka	3–0	Vissel Kobe
Abe 2'; Usami 28'; Kurata 83'

Osaka Expo '70 Stadium
Attendance: 11,294
Referee: Toshimitsu Yoshida

Gamba Osaka won 4–1 on aggregate.

=== Semi-finals ===
==== First leg ====
9 October 2014
19:03

Sanfrecce Hiroshima	2–0	Kashiwa Reysol
Sato 41', 50'

EDION Stadium Hiroshima
Attendance: 5,516
Referee: Toshimitsu Yoshida

9 October 2014
19:00

Gamba Osaka	3–1	Kawasaki Frontale
Yonekura 16'; Usami 28'; Patric 49'		90+2' Tanaka

Osaka Expo '70 Stadium
Attendance: 5,482
Referee: Jumpei Iida

==== Second leg ====
12 October 2014
16:00

Kashiwa Reysol	2–1	Sanfrecce Hiroshima
Leandro 38', 51'		Ishihara 74'

Hitachi Kashiwa Soccer Stadium
Attendance: 9,010
Referee: Masaaki Toma

Sanfrecce Hiroshima won 3–2 on aggregate.

12 October 2014
16:00

Kawasaki Frontale	3–2	Gamba Osaka
Ōkubo 9'; Jeci 45+3'; Moriya 51'		Abe 42', 45'

Todoroki Athletics Stadium
Attendance: 16,211
Referee: Minoru Tōjō

Gamba Osaka won 5-4 on aggregate.

=== Final ===
8 November 2014
13:05

Sanfrecce Hiroshima	2–3	Gamba Osaka
Sato 20', 35'		Patric 38', 54'; Omori 71'

Saitama Stadium 2002
Attendance: 38,126
Referee: Yuichi Nishimura

== Goalscorers ==
Rank	Scorer	Club	Goals
1	(Brazil) Cristiano	Ventforet Kofu	6
T2	(Brazil) Edu	FC Tokyo	4
T2	(Japan) **Masato Kudo**	Kashiwa Reysol	4
T2	(Brazil) **Leandro**	Kashiwa Reysol	4
T2	(Slovenia) Milivoje Novaković	Shimizu S-Pulse	4
T2	(Japan) **Takashi Usami**	Gamba Osaka	4
T7	(Japan) Tadanari Lee	Urawa Red Diamonds	3
T7	(Japan) Musashi Suzuki	Albirex Niigata	3
T7	(Japan) Junya Tanaka	Kashiwa Reysol	3
T7	(Japan) Marcus Tulio Tanaka	Nagoya Grampus	3

Updated to games played on 7 September 2014
Names of players in bold are still active.
