= Naoki Ishihara =

Japanese footballer (born 1984)

Naoki Ishihara 石原 直樹
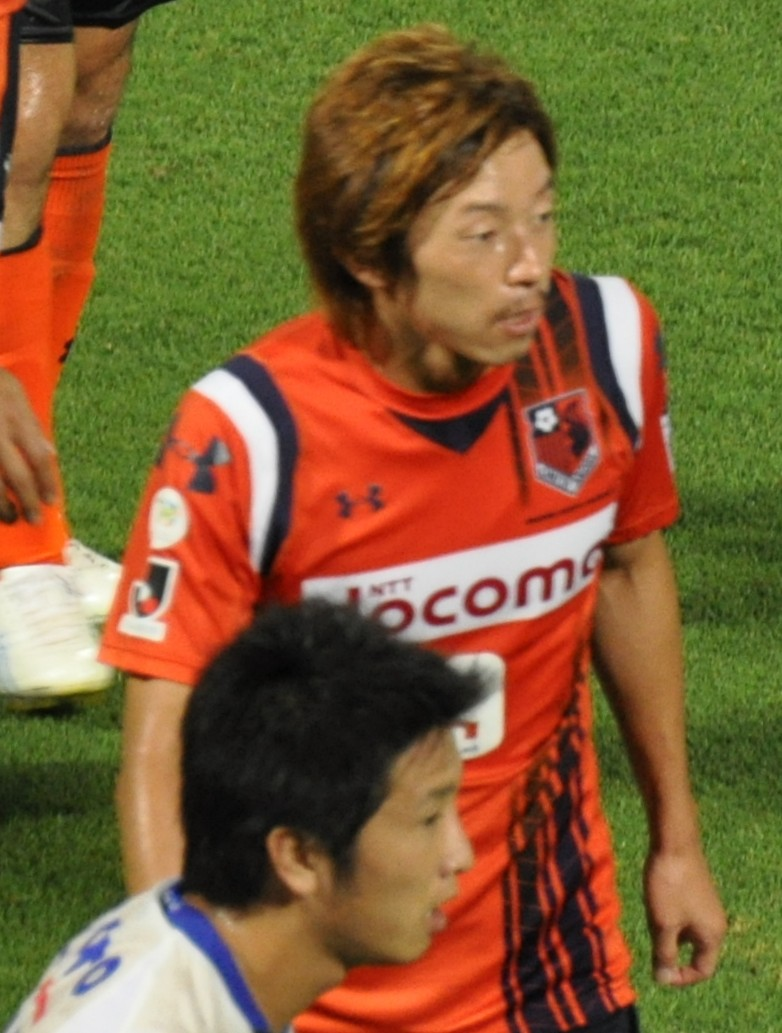
- Ishihara with Omiya Ardija in 2011

Personal information
- Full name: Naoki Ishihara
- Date of birth: August 14, 1984 (age 42)
- Place of birth: Takasaki, Gunma, Japan
- Height: 1.73 m (5 ft 8 in)
- Position: Forward

Youth career
- 2000–2002: Takasaki City University of Economics

Senior career*
Years	Team	Apps	(Gls)
2003–2008	Shonan Bellmare	143	(41)
2009–2011	Omiya Ardija	90	(20)
2012–2014	Sanfrecce Hiroshima	94	(27)
2015–2017	Urawa Red Diamonds	10	(0)
2017	→ Vegalta Sendai (loan)	31	(10)
2018–2019	Vegalta Sendai	54	(8)
2020–2021	Shonan Bellmare	45	(6)
Total		467	(112)
Medal record
Sanfrecce Hiroshima
Winner	J1 League	2012
Winner	J1 League	2013
Runner-up	J.League Cup	2014
Runner-up	Emperor's Cup	2013
Urawa Red Diamonds
Runner-up	J1 League	2016
Winner	J.League Cup	2016
Runner-up	Emperor's Cup	2015
Vegalta Sendai
Runner-up	Emperor's Cup	2018
- * Club domestic league appearances and goals as of 18:02, 17 October 2022 (UTC)

Naoki Ishihara (石原 直樹, Ishihara Naoki; born 14 August 1984) is a Japanese former professional footballer who played as a forward.

He started his career at Shonan Bellmare, before later playing for Omiya Ardija, Sanfrecce Hiroshima, Urawa Red Diamonds and Vegalta Sendai before announcing his retirement in March 2022. He made over 500 appearances at senior club level in Japan.

== Career ==
On 31 December 2008, Ishihara was announced at Omiya Ardija on a permanent transfer.

On 16 December 2014, Ishihara was announced at Urawa Reds on a permanent transfer. On 23 April 2015, the club announced that he had suffered an ACL injury, and would be out for six months after surgery. Ishihara made his return to playing on 12 November 2015 in the Emperor's Cup against Machida Zelvia. In March 2016, he was suspended for two games due to violent conduct.

On 29 December 2016, Ishihara was announced at Vegalta Sendai on a one year loan spell.

On 30 December 2019, Ishihara was announced at fellow J1 club Shonan Bellmare on a permanent transfer. At the beginning of the 2020 season, he was appointed as a vice-captain along with Akito Fukuta and Mitsuki Saito.

On 8 January 2022, the club announced that Ishihara would not be extending his contract for the 2022 season.

On 20 March 2022, Ishihara announced his retirement, and announced he would become an ambassador for Shonan Bellmare.

== Coaching career ==
In January 2023, Ishihara was appointed coach of Shonan Bellmare U15s.

== Style of play ==
Ishihara is noted for his good attitude to training and teamwork.

== Club statistics ==
As of the end 2021 season.

Club performance			League		Cup		League Cup		Continental		Other^{1}		Total	
Season	Club	League	Apps	Goals	Apps	Goals	Apps	Goals	Apps	Goals	Apps	Goals	Apps	Goals
Japan			League		Emperor's Cup		J.League Cup		Asia		Other		Total	
2003	Shonan Bellmare	J2 League	17	2	1	0	–		–		–		18	2
2004	Shonan Bellmare	J2 League	3	0	0	0	–		–		–		3	0
2005	Shonan Bellmare	J2 League	8	0	1	0	–		–		–		9	0
2006	Shonan Bellmare	J2 League	29	9	2	1	–		–		–		31	10
2007	Shonan Bellmare	J2 League	45	12	2	2	–		–		–		47	14
2008	Shonan Bellmare	J2 League	41	18	1	0	–		–		–		42	18
2009	Omiya Ardija	J1 League	32	7	2	0	4	1	–		–		38	8
2010	Omiya Ardija	J1 League	33	9	3	0	6	1	–		–		42	10
2011	Omiya Ardija	J1 League	25	4	2	0	1	0	–		–		28	4
2012	Sanfrecce Hiroshima	J1 League	32	7	1	0	5	2	-	-	-	-	38	9
2013	Sanfrecce Hiroshima	J1 League	33	10	5	1	2	0	6	2	3	0	49	13
2014	Sanfrecce Hiroshima	J1 League	29	10	0	0	3	1	8	3	1	0	41	14
2015	Urawa Red Diamonds	J1 League	4	0	1	0	0	0	4	0	0	0	9	0
2016	Urawa Red Diamonds	J1 League	6	0	0	0	1	0	2	0	0	0	9	0
2017	Vegalta Sendai	J1 League	31	10	1	0	6	1	–		–		38	11
2018	Vegalta Sendai	J1 League	34	7	5	2	3	0	–		–		42	9
2019	Vegalta Sendai	J1 League	20	1	1	0	4	1	–		–		25	2
2020	Shonan Bellmare	J1 League	27	6	0	0	2	0	–		–		29	6
2021	Shonan Bellmare	J1 League	18	0	2	0	6	0	–		–		26	0
Career total			467	112	30	6	45	7	20	5	4	0	566	130

^{1}Includes Japanese Super Cup, FIFA Club World Cup and J.League Championship.

== Honours ==
=== Club ===
Sanfrecce Hiroshima

- J1 League (2) : 2012, 2013
- Japanese Super Cup (2) : 2013, 2014

Urawa Reds

- J.League Cup (1): 2016
