= Junya Osaki =

Japanese footballer

Junya Osaki 大﨑 淳矢
Personal information
- Full name: Junya Osaki
- Date of birth: April 2, 1991 (age 35)
- Place of birth: Toyama, Japan
- Height: 1.73 m (5 ft 8 in)
- Position: Forward

Team information
- Current team: Criacao Shinjuku
- Number: 21

Youth career
- 2007–2009: Sanfrecce Hiroshima Youth

Senior career*
Years	Team	Apps	(Gls)
2009–2012	Sanfrecce Hiroshima	33	(5)
2013–2017	Tokushima Vortis	165	(24)
2018	Renofa Yamaguchi	34	(2)
2019–2021	Tochigi SC	39	(5)
2021-2022	Kataller Toyama	0	(0)
2022-	Criacao Shinjuku	44	(4)

International career
2009	Japan U-18	3	(0)
Medal record
Sanfrecce Hiroshima
Winner	J1 League	2012
Runner-up	J.League Cup	2010
- * Club domestic league appearances and goals as of 22 August 2024 @ 10:38(AEST)

Junya Osaki (大﨑 淳矢, Ōsaki Junya; born April 2, 1991 in Toyama) is a Japanese football player currently playing for Tochigi SC.

== Club statistics ==
Updated to end of 2018 season.

Club performance			League		Cup		League Cup		Continental		Other		Total	
Season	Club	League	Apps	Goals	Apps	Goals	Apps	Goals	Apps	Goals	Apps	Goals	Apps	Goals
Japan			League		Emperor's Cup		League Cup		Asia		Other^{1}		Total	
2009	Sanfrecce Hiroshima	J1 League	1	0	0	0	3	1	-		-		4	1
2010	Sanfrecce Hiroshima	J1 League	9	2	1	0	1	0	2	1	-		13	3
2011	Sanfrecce Hiroshima	J1 League	0	0	1	0	0	0	-		-		1	0
2012	Sanfrecce Hiroshima	J1 League	12	1	0	0	3	0	-		0	0	15	1
2013	Tokushima Vortis	J2 League	41	8	1	0	-		-		2	0	44	8
2014	Tokushima Vortis	J1 League	31	0	2	0	3	2	-		-		36	2
2015	Tokushima Vortis	J2 League	28	1	4	0	-		-		-		32	1
2016	Tokushima Vortis	J2 League	34	6	1	1	-		-		-		35	7
2017	Tokushima Vortis	J2 League	18	6	1	0	-		-		-		19	6
2018	Renofa Yamaguchi	J2 League	32	2	2	0	-		-		-		34	2
Career total			206	26	11	1	11	3	2	1	2	0	234	31

^{1}Includes FIFA Club World Cup and Promotion Playoffs to J1.

== National Team Career ==
Last update: 29 January 2010

=== Appearances in major competitions ===
Team	Competition	Category	Appearances		Goals	Team Record
Team	Competition	Category	Start	Sub	Goals	Team Record
Japan	2010 AFC U-19 Championship qualification	U-18	1	2	0	Qualified
