= Yudai Yamamoto =

Japanese football referee

- Full name: Yudai Yamamoto
- Born: 4 March 1983 (age 43); Japan

Domestic
Years	League	Role
2025	Super League (Indonesia)	Referee

International
Years	League	Role
2011–	FIFA listed	Referee

Yudai Yamamoto (山本 雄大, Yamamoto Yūdai; born 1983) is a Japanese professional football referee. He has been a full international for FIFA since 2011. He refereed some matches in AFC Champions League.
