= 2014 Japanese Super Cup =

Sanfrecce Hiroshima	Yokohama F. Marinos
2	0
- Date: 22 February 2014
- Venue: National Stadium, Tokyo
- Referee: Ryuji Sato
- Attendance: 41,273

The 2014 Japanese Super Cup was held on 22 February 2014 between the 2013 J. League champions Sanfrecce Hiroshima and the 2013 Emperor's Cup winners Yokohama F. Marinos. Sanfrecce Hiroshima won the match 2–0 after a Gakuto Notsuda and Takuma Asano goal.

== Match ==
22 February 2014
13:35 JST

Sanfrecce Hiroshima	2–0	Yokohama F. Marinos
Notsuda 6'; Asano 66'	Summary

National Stadium, Tokyo
Attendance: 41,273
Referee: (Japan) Ryuji Sato

Sanfrecce Hiroshima	Yokohama F. Marinos
