= 2007 Emperor's Cup final =

2007 Emperor's Cup Final
Kashima Antlers	Sanfrecce Hiroshima
2	0
- Date: January 1, 2008
- Venue: National Stadium, Tokyo

2007 Emperor's Cup Final was the 87th final of the Emperor's Cup competition. The final was played at National Stadium in Tokyo on January 1, 2007. Kashima Antlers won the championship.

== Match details ==
January 1, 2008

Kashima Antlers	2–0	Sanfrecce Hiroshima
Atsuto Uchida 8'; Danilo 89'

National Stadium

Kashima Antlers
GK	21	(Japan) Hitoshi Sogahata
DF	2	(Japan) Atsuto Uchida
DF	3	(Japan) Daiki Iwamasa
DF	4	(Japan) Go Oiwa
DF	7	(Japan) Toru Araiba
MF	15	(Japan) Takeshi Aoki
MF	40	(Japan) Mitsuo Ogasawara
MF	10	(Japan) Masashi Motoyama
MF	8	(Japan) Takuya Nozawa	(substituted off) 80'
FW	18	(Brazil) Marquinho	(substituted off) 86'
FW	9	(Japan) Yuzo Tashiro	(substituted off) 89'
Substitutes:
GK	1	(Japan) Hideaki Ozawa
MF	11	(Brazil) Danilo	(substituted on) 80'
MF	14	(Japan) Chikashi Masuda
MF	16	(Japan) Masaki Chugo	(substituted on) 86'
MF	23	(Japan) Yuji Funayama
FW	13	(Japan) Atsushi Yanagisawa	(substituted on) 89'
FW	17	(Japan) Shinzo Koroki
Manager:
(Brazil) Oswaldo Oliveira

Sanfrecce Hiroshima
GK	1	(Japan) Takashi Shimoda
DF	28	(Japan) Tomoaki Makino
DF	2	(Bulgaria) Stoyanov
DF	19	(Japan) Kohei Morita
MF	5	(Japan) Yūichi Komano
MF	8	(Japan) Kazuyuki Morisaki
MF	17	(Japan) Kota Hattori
MF	7	(Japan) Koji Morisaki
MF	15	(Japan) Yojiro Takahagi	(substituted off) 83'
FW	11	(Japan) Hisato Sato
FW	18	(Japan) Ryuichi Hirashige	(substituted off) 77'
Substitutes:
GK	21	(Japan) Koichi Kidera
MF	3	(Japan) Mitsuyuki Yoshihiro
MF	14	(Japan) Kazuyuki Toda
MF	16	(North Korea) Ri Han-jae	(substituted on) 77'
MF	20	(Japan) Shinichiro Kuwada
MF	23	(Japan) Katsumi Yusa
MF	25	(Japan) Issei Takayanagi	(substituted on) 83'
Manager:
(Serbia) Petrovic

== See also ==
- 2007 Emperor's Cup
