= 2008 Sanfrecce Hiroshima season =

Sanfrecce Hiroshima
2008 season
- Manager: Mihailo Petrović
- Stadium: Hiroshima Big Arch
- J. League 2: 1st
- Emperor's Cup: Quarterfinals
- Super Cup: Winners
- Top goalscorer: Hisato Satō (28)
Home colours	Away colours

2008 Sanfrecce Hiroshima season

== Competitions ==
Competitions	Position
J. League 2	1st / 15 clubs
Emperor's Cup	Quarterfinals

== Domestic results ==
=== J. League 2 ===
Pos	Team	Pld	W	D	L	GF	GA	GD	Pts	Promotion
1	Sanfrecce Hiroshima (C, P)	42	31	7	4	99	35	+64	100	Promotion to 2009 J. League Division 1
2	Montedio Yamagata (P)	42	23	9	10	66	40	+26	78	Promotion to 2009 J. League Division 1
3	Vegalta Sendai	42	18	16	8	62	47	+15	70	2008 promotion/relegation Series
4	Cerezo Osaka	42	21	6	15	81	60	+21	69	
5	Shonan Bellmare	42	19	8	15	68	48	+20	65	

Updated to match(es) played on December 6, 2008. Source: J. League Division 2
Rules for classification: 1) points; 2) goal difference; 3) number of goals scored.
(C) Champions; (P) Promoted

Match	Date	Venue	Opponents	Score
1	2008..	[[]]	[[]]	-
2	2008..	[[]]	[[]]	-
3	2008..	[[]]	[[]]	-
4	2008..	[[]]	[[]]	-
5	2008..	[[]]	[[]]	-
6	2008..	[[]]	[[]]	-
7	2008..	[[]]	[[]]	-
8	2008..	[[]]	[[]]	-
9	2008..	[[]]	[[]]	-
10	2008..	[[]]	[[]]	-
11	2008..	[[]]	[[]]	-
12	2008..	[[]]	[[]]	-
13	2008..	[[]]	[[]]	-
14	2008..	[[]]	[[]]	-
15	2008..	[[]]	[[]]	-
16	2008..	[[]]	[[]]	-
17	2008..	[[]]	[[]]	-
18	2008..	[[]]	[[]]	-
19	2008..	[[]]	[[]]	-
20	2008..	[[]]	[[]]	-
21	2008..	[[]]	[[]]	-
22	2008..	[[]]	[[]]	-
23	2008..	[[]]	[[]]	-
24	2008..	[[]]	[[]]	-
25	2008..	[[]]	[[]]	-
26	2008..	[[]]	[[]]	-
27	2008..	[[]]	[[]]	-
28	2008..	[[]]	[[]]	-
29	2008..	[[]]	[[]]	-
30	2008..	[[]]	[[]]	-
31	2008..	[[]]	[[]]	-
32	2008..	[[]]	[[]]	-
33	2008..	[[]]	[[]]	-
34	2008..	[[]]	[[]]	-
35	2008..	[[]]	[[]]	-
36	2008..	[[]]	[[]]	-
37	2008..	[[]]	[[]]	-
38	2008..	[[]]	[[]]	-
39	2008..	[[]]	[[]]	-
40	2008..	[[]]	[[]]	-
41	2008..	[[]]	[[]]	-
42	2008..	[[]]	[[]]	-
43	2008..	[[]]	[[]]	-
44	2008..	[[]]	[[]]	-
45	2008..	[[]]	[[]]	-

=== Emperor's Cup ===
Sanfrecce Hiroshima received a bye to the third round as being part of the J.League Division 2.

12 October 2008 3rd Round	Sanfrecce Hiroshima	6–0	Osaka Taiiku University	Akita
13:00	Makino 15'; Hattori 30', 75'; Kuwada (yellow card) 66'; Moriwaki 69'; Takayanagi 86'; Kubo 87'	Report	Hashimoto (yellow card) 14'	Stadium: Akita Yabase Athletic Field; Attendance: 1,271; Referee: Hiroyuki Kimura

2 November 2008 4th Round	Tokyo Verdy	0–1	Sanfrecce Hiroshima	Tokyo
13:00	Souza (red card) 44'; Hiramoto (yellow card) 58'	Report	Stoyanov (yellow card) 44'; Morisaki (yellow card) 48'; Moriwaki (yellow card) 84'; Takayanagi 89'	Stadium: Nishigaoka Soccer Stadium; Attendance: 5,411; Referee: Masaaki Iemoto

15 November 2008 5th Round	Kawasaki Frontale	0–2	Sanfrecce Hiroshima	Nagasaki
13:04	Tasaka (yellow card) 31'; Renatinho (yellow card) 73'	Report	Aoyama 33' (yellow card) 68'; Ri Han-jae (yellow card) 55'; Morisaki 57'; Moriwaki (yellow card) 71'; Morisaki (yellow card) 79'	Stadium: Nagasaki Stadium; Attendance: 4,858; Referee: Kazuhiko Matsumura

20 December 2008 Quarter-finals	Kashiwa Reysol	3–2 (a.e.t.)	Sanfrecce Hiroshima	Okayama
15:04	Koga 3'; Suganuma 13'; Sugiyama (yellow card) 37'; França 99'	Report	Satō 6', 26'	Stadium: Okayama Stadium; Attendance: 8,531; Referee: Masaaki Iemoto

=== Super Cup ===
Sanfrecce Hiroshima qualified for this tournament as runners-up of the 2007 Emperor's Cup.

1 March 2008 Final	Kashima Antlers	2–2 (3–4 p)	Sanfrecce Hiroshima	Tokyo
13:35	Iwamasa (yellow card) 7' (yellow-red card) 12'; Aoki (yellow card) 42'; Motoyama 49'; Nozawa 52'; Ōiwa (yellow card) 79'	Report	Ri Han-jae (yellow card) 33' (yellow-red card) 38'; Hattori (yellow card) 60'; Kubo 80'; Jukić (yellow card) 84'; Satō 85' (yellow card) 89'	Stadium: National Stadium; Attendance: 27,245; Referee: Masaaki Iemoto
	Penalties
	Marquinhos (penalty scored); Chugo (penalty scored); Danilo (penalty missed); Motoyama (penalty missed); Ogasawara (penalty scored)		(penalty scored) Morisaki; (penalty scored) Stoyanov; (penalty scored) Makino; (penalty missed) Jukić; (penalty scored) Satō

== Player statistics ==
No.	Pos.	Player	D.o.B. (Age)	Height / Weight	J. League 2		Emperor's Cup		Total	
No.	Pos.	Player	D.o.B. (Age)	Height / Weight	Apps	Goals	Apps	Goals	Apps	Goals
1	GK	Takashi Shimoda	November 28, 1975 (aged 32)	cm / kg	0	0				
2	DF	Ilian Stoyanov	January 20, 1977 (aged 31)	cm / kg	32	2				
3	DF	Kozo Yuki	January 23, 1979 (aged 29)	cm / kg	19	0				
4	DF	Dario Dabac	May 23, 1978 (aged 29)	cm / kg	1	0				
5	DF	Tomoaki Makino	May 11, 1987 (aged 20)	cm / kg	41	7				
6	MF	Toshihiro Aoyama	February 22, 1986 (aged 22)	cm / kg	36	4				
7	MF	Kōji Morisaki	May 9, 1981 (aged 26)	cm / kg	40	14				
8	MF	Kazuyuki Morisaki	May 9, 1981 (aged 26)	cm / kg	33	2				
9	FW	Stjepan Jukić	December 10, 1979 (aged 28)	cm / kg	11	0				
10	MF	Yosuke Kashiwagi	December 15, 1987 (aged 20)	cm / kg	31	4				
11	FW	Hisato Satō	March 12, 1982 (aged 25)	cm / kg	40	28				
14	MF	Kazuyuki Toda	December 30, 1977 (aged 30)	cm / kg	1	0				
15	MF	Yojiro Takahagi	August 2, 1986 (aged 21)	cm / kg	38	14				
16	MF	Ri Han-Jae	June 27, 1982 (aged 25)	cm / kg	37	1				
17	MF	Kota Hattori	November 22, 1977 (aged 30)	cm / kg	41	4				
18	FW	Ryuichi Hirashige	June 15, 1988 (aged 19)	cm / kg	17	5				
19	DF	Kohei Morita	July 13, 1976 (aged 31)	cm / kg	16	1				
20	MF	Shinichiro Kuwada	December 6, 1986 (aged 21)	cm / kg	14	1				
21	GK	Koichi Kidera	April 4, 1972 (aged 35)	cm / kg	19	0				
22	MF	Tsubasa Yokotake	August 30, 1989 (aged 18)	cm / kg	0	0				
23	MF	Katsumi Yusa	August 2, 1988 (aged 19)	cm / kg	0	0				
24	DF	Ryota Moriwaki	April 6, 1986 (aged 21)	cm / kg	21	5				
25	MF	Issei Takayanagi	September 14, 1986 (aged 21)	cm / kg	24	0				
26	DF	Yuya Hashiuchi	July 13, 1987 (aged 20)	cm / kg	2	0				
27	FW	Kohei Shimizu	April 30, 1989 (aged 18)	cm / kg	4	1				
28	FW	Takuya Marutani	May 30, 1989 (aged 18)	cm / kg	0	0				
29	MF	Kenta Uchida	October 2, 1989 (aged 18)	cm / kg	0	0				
30	MF	Sho Shinohara	August 11, 1989 (aged 18)	cm / kg	0	0				
31	GK	Akihiro Sato	August 30, 1986 (aged 21)	cm / kg	24	0				
32	MF	Tomotaka Okamoto	June 29, 1990 (aged 17)	cm / kg	1	0				
33	MF	Takashi Rakuyama	August 11, 1980 (aged 27)	cm / kg	10	0				
34	GK	Hirotsugu Nakabayashi	April 28, 1986 (aged 21)	cm / kg	0	0				
39	FW	Tatsuhiko Kubo	June 18, 1976 (aged 31)	cm / kg	25	3				

== Other pages ==
- (in Japanese) J. League official site
