= 2007 Sanfrecce Hiroshima season =

Sanfrecce Hiroshima
2007 season
- Manager: Mihailo Petrović
- Stadium: Hiroshima Big Arch
- J. League 1: 16th
- Emperor's Cup: Runners-up
- J. League Cup: Quarterfinals
- Top goalscorer: Ueslei (17)

2007 Sanfrecce Hiroshima season

== Competitions ==
Competitions	Position
J. League 1	16th / 18 clubs
Emperor's Cup	Runners-up
J. League Cup	Quarterfinals

== Domestic results ==
=== J. League 1 ===
J. League 1 match results
Round	Date	Opponent	Venue	Result F–A
1	3 March 2007	FC Tokyo	Away	4–2
2	10 March 2007	Kashiwa Reysol	Home	1–1
3	17 March 2007	Gamba Osaka	Away	0–3
4	31 March 2007	Yokohama F. Marinos	Home	1–3
5	7 April 2007	Nagoya Grampus	Away	3–2
6	14 April 2007	Ventforet Kofu	Home	2–2
7	21 April 2007	Albirex Niigata	Home	0–0
8	28 April 2007	Júbilo Iwata	Away	2–4
9	3 May 2007	RB Omiya Ardija	Home	2–1
10	6 May 2007	Oita Trinita	Away	2–1
11	12 May 2007	Yokohama FC	Home	0–2
12	19 May 2007	JEF United Chiba	Away	3–1
13	26 May 2007	Shimizu S-Pulse	Home	2–1
15	16 June 2007	Kashima Antlers	Away	1–5
16	20 June 2007	Kawasaki Frontale	Home	1–1
17	23 June 2007	Vissel Kobe	Away	2–3
18	30 June 2007	Albirex Niigata	Away	1–2
14	1 August 2007	Urawa Red Diamonds	Away	1–4
19	12 August 2007	Nagoya Grampus	Home	1–3
20	15 August 2007	Kashiwa Reysol	Away	0–2
21	18 August 2007	Oita Trinita	Home	2–0
22	26 August 2007	Yokohama F. Marinos	Away	2–2
23	29 August 2007	FC Tokyo	Home	0–5
24	1 September 2007	Yokohama FC	Away	2–1
25	15 September 2007	Urawa Red Diamonds	Home	2–4
26	22 September 2007	Ventforet Kofu	Away	1–2
27	30 September 2007	Kashima Antlers	Home	0–1
28	6 October 2007	Júbilo Iwata	Home	0–1
29	20 October 2007	RB Omiya Ardija	Away	0–1
30	27 October 2007	JEF United Chiba	Home	2–2
31	11 November 2007	Shimizu S-Pulse	Away	1–3
32	18 November 2007	Vissel Kobe	Home	1–1
33	24 November 2007	Kawasaki Frontale	Away	0–3
34	1 December 2007	Gamba Osaka	Home	2–2

=== Emperor's Cup ===
Match	Date	Venue	Opponents	Score
4th Round	2007..	[[]]	[[]]	-
5th Round	2007..	[[]]	[[]]	-
Quarterfinals	2007..	[[]]	[[]]	-
Semifinals	2007..	[[]]	[[]]	-
Final	2007..	[[]]	[[]]	-

=== J. League Cup ===
Match	Date	Venue	Opponents	Score
GL-A-1	2007..	[[]]	[[]]	-
GL-A-2	2007..	[[]]	[[]]	-
GL-A-3	2007..	[[]]	[[]]	-
GL-A-4	2007..	[[]]	[[]]	-
GL-A-5	2007..	[[]]	[[]]	-
GL-A-6	2007..	[[]]	[[]]	-
Quarterfinals-1	2007..	[[]]	[[]]	-
Quarterfinals-2	2007..	[[]]	[[]]	-

== Player statistics ==
No.	Pos.	Player	D.o.B. (Age)	Height / Weight	J. League 1		Emperor's Cup		J. League Cup		Total	
No.	Pos.	Player	D.o.B. (Age)	Height / Weight	Apps	Goals	Apps	Goals	Apps	Goals	Apps	Goals
1	GK	Takashi Shimoda	November 28, 1975 (aged 31)	cm / kg	31	0						
2	DF	Ilian Stoyanov	January 20, 1977 (aged 30)	cm / kg	13	0						
3	DF	Mitsuyuki Yoshihiro	May 4, 1985 (aged 21)	cm / kg	3	0						
4	DF	Dario Dabac	May 23, 1978 (aged 28)	cm / kg	6	0						
5	DF	Yūichi Komano	July 25, 1981 (aged 25)	cm / kg	34	2						
6	MF	Toshihiro Aoyama	February 22, 1986 (aged 21)	cm / kg	28	0						
7	MF	Kōji Morisaki	May 9, 1981 (aged 25)	cm / kg	32	2						
8	MF	Kazuyuki Morisaki	May 9, 1981 (aged 25)	cm / kg	32	0						
9	FW	Yusaku Ueno	November 1, 1973 (aged 33)	cm / kg	0	0						
10	FW	Ueslei	April 19, 1972 (aged 34)	cm / kg	29	17						
11	FW	Hisato Satō	March 12, 1982 (aged 24)	cm / kg	34	12						
13	FW	Yuki Tamura	December 31, 1985 (aged 21)	cm / kg	0	0						
14	MF	Kazuyuki Toda	December 30, 1977 (aged 29)	cm / kg	31	2						
15	MF	Yojiro Takahagi	August 2, 1986 (aged 20)	cm / kg	3	0						
16	MF	Ri Han-Jae	June 27, 1982 (aged 24)	cm / kg	6	0						
17	MF	Kota Hattori	November 22, 1977 (aged 29)	cm / kg	34	2						
18	FW	Ryuichi Hirashige	June 15, 1988 (aged 18)	cm / kg	20	0						
19	DF	Kohei Morita	July 13, 1976 (aged 30)	cm / kg	17	0						
20	MF	Shinichiro Kuwada	December 6, 1986 (aged 20)	cm / kg	12	0						
21	GK	Koichi Kidera	April 4, 1972 (aged 34)	cm / kg	3	0						
22	DF	Mana Nakao	September 2, 1986 (aged 20)	cm / kg	0	0						
23	MF	Katsumi Yusa	August 2, 1988 (aged 18)	cm / kg	1	0						
24	FW	Shunsuke Maeda	June 9, 1986 (aged 20)	cm / kg	0	0						
25	MF	Issei Takayanagi	September 14, 1986 (aged 20)	cm / kg	21	0						
26	DF	Yuya Hashiuchi	July 13, 1987 (aged 19)	cm / kg	0	0						
27	MF	Yosuke Kashiwagi	December 15, 1987 (aged 19)	cm / kg	31	5						
28	DF	Tomoaki Makino	May 11, 1987 (aged 19)	cm / kg	18	1						
29	FW	Cho Woo-Jin	July 7, 1987 (aged 19)	cm / kg	0	0						
30	DF	Kazuma Irifune	November 15, 1986 (aged 20)	cm / kg	0	0						
36	GK	Naoto Kono	September 9, 1985 (aged 21)	cm / kg	0	0						

== Other pages ==
- (in Japanese) J. League official site
