= 2006 Sanfrecce Hiroshima season =

Sanfrecce Hiroshima
2006 season
- Manager: Takeshi Ono; Kazuyori Mochizuki; Mihailo Petrović
- Stadium: Hiroshima Big Arch
- J. League 1: 10th
- Emperor's Cup: 5th Round
- J. League Cup: GL-C 4th
- Top goalscorer: Hisato Satō (18)

2006 Sanfrecce Hiroshima season

== Competitions ==
Competitions	Position
J. League 1	10th / 18 clubs
Emperor's Cup	5th Round
J. League Cup	GL-C 4th / 4 clubs

== Domestic results ==
=== J. League 1 ===
Match	Date	Venue	Opponents	Score
1	2006..	[[]]	[[]]	-
2	2006..	[[]]	[[]]	-
3	2006..	[[]]	[[]]	-
4	2006..	[[]]	[[]]	-
5	2006..	[[]]	[[]]	-
6	2006..	[[]]	[[]]	-
7	2006..	[[]]	[[]]	-
8	2006..	[[]]	[[]]	-
9	2006..	[[]]	[[]]	-
10	2006..	[[]]	[[]]	-
11	2006..	[[]]	[[]]	-
12	2006..	[[]]	[[]]	-
13	2006..	[[]]	[[]]	-
14	2006..	[[]]	[[]]	-
15	2006..	[[]]	[[]]	-
16	2006..	[[]]	[[]]	-
17	2006..	[[]]	[[]]	-
18	2006..	[[]]	[[]]	-
19	2006..	[[]]	[[]]	-
20	2006..	[[]]	[[]]	-
21	2006..	[[]]	[[]]	-
22	2006..	[[]]	[[]]	-
23	2006..	[[]]	[[]]	-
24	2006..	[[]]	[[]]	-
25	2006..	[[]]	[[]]	-
26	2006..	[[]]	[[]]	-
27	2006..	[[]]	[[]]	-
28	2006..	[[]]	[[]]	-
29	2006..	[[]]	[[]]	-
30	2006..	[[]]	[[]]	-
31	2006..	[[]]	[[]]	-
32	2006..	[[]]	[[]]	-
33	2006..	[[]]	[[]]	-
34	2006..	[[]]	[[]]	-

=== Emperor's Cup ===
Match	Date	Venue	Opponents	Score
4th Round	2006..	[[]]	[[]]	-
5th Round	2006..	[[]]	[[]]	-

=== J. League Cup ===
Match	Date	Venue	Opponents	Score
GL-C-1	2006..	[[]]	[[]]	-
GL-C-2	2006..	[[]]	[[]]	-
GL-C-3	2006..	[[]]	[[]]	-
GL-C-4	2006..	[[]]	[[]]	-
GL-C-5	2006..	[[]]	[[]]	-
GL-C-6	2006..	[[]]	[[]]	-

== Player statistics ==
No.	Pos.	Player	D.o.B. (Age)	Height / Weight	J. League 1		Emperor's Cup		J. League Cup		Total	
No.	Pos.	Player	D.o.B. (Age)	Height / Weight	Apps	Goals	Apps	Goals	Apps	Goals	Apps	Goals
1	GK	Takashi Shimoda	November 28, 1975 (aged 30)	cm / kg	33	0						
2	DF	Kosuke Yatsuda	March 17, 1982 (aged 23)	cm / kg	4	0						
3	DF	Norio Omura	September 6, 1969 (aged 36)	cm / kg	9	0						
4	DF	Dininho	July 23, 1975 (aged 30)	cm / kg	5	0						
4	DF	Dario Dabac	May 23, 1978 (aged 27)	cm / kg	11	0						
5	DF	Yūichi Komano	July 25, 1981 (aged 24)	cm / kg	31	2						
6	MF	Beto	January 7, 1975 (aged 31)	cm / kg	13	0						
7	MF	Kōji Morisaki	May 9, 1981 (aged 24)	cm / kg	30	4						
8	MF	Kazuyuki Morisaki	May 9, 1981 (aged 24)	cm / kg	26	2						
9	FW	Yusaku Ueno	November 1, 1973 (aged 32)	cm / kg	21	0						
10	FW	Ueslei	April 19, 1972 (aged 33)	cm / kg	27	16						
11	FW	Hisato Satō	March 12, 1982 (aged 23)	cm / kg	33	18						
14	MF	Kazuyuki Toda	December 30, 1977 (aged 28)	cm / kg	30	0						
15	MF	Koji Nakazato	April 24, 1982 (aged 23)	cm / kg	12	0						
16	MF	Ri Han-Jae	June 27, 1982 (aged 23)	cm / kg	26	2						
17	MF	Kota Hattori	November 22, 1977 (aged 28)	cm / kg	34	1						
18	DF	Mitsuyuki Yoshihiro	May 4, 1985 (aged 20)	cm / kg	11	0						
19	DF	Kohei Morita	July 13, 1976 (aged 29)	cm / kg	19	0						
20	FW	Susumu Oki	February 23, 1976 (aged 30)	cm / kg	5	0						
21	GK	Koichi Kidera	April 4, 1972 (aged 33)	cm / kg	1	0						
22	DF	Shogo Nishikawa	July 1, 1983 (aged 22)	cm / kg	2	0						
23	MF	Toshihiro Aoyama	February 22, 1986 (aged 20)	cm / kg	19	1						
24	FW	Shunsuke Maeda	June 9, 1986 (aged 19)	cm / kg	8	1						
25	MF	Issei Takayanagi	September 14, 1986 (aged 19)	cm / kg	13	0						
26	DF	Yuya Hashiuchi	July 13, 1987 (aged 18)	cm / kg	1	0						
27	MF	Yosuke Kashiwagi	December 15, 1987 (aged 18)	cm / kg	17	1						
28	DF	Tomoaki Makino	May 11, 1987 (aged 18)	cm / kg	1	0						
29	FW	Cho Woo-Jin	July 7, 1987 (aged 18)	cm / kg	0	0						
30	DF	Kazuma Irifune	November 15, 1986 (aged 19)	cm / kg	1	0						
31	GK	Akihiro Sato	August 30, 1986 (aged 19)	cm / kg	0	0						
32	MF	Shinichiro Kuwada	December 6, 1986 (aged 19)	cm / kg	9	0						
33	DF	Mana Nakao	September 2, 1986 (aged 19)	cm / kg	0	0						
36	GK	Naoto Kono	September 9, 1985 (aged 20)	cm / kg	0	0						

== Other pages ==
- (in Japanese) J. League official site
