= 2011 Sanfrecce Hiroshima season =

Sanfrecce Hiroshima
2011 season
- Manager: Mihailo Petrović
- J.League Division 1: 7th
- Emperor's Cup: Third Round
- J.League Cup: First Round
- Top goalscorer: Tadanari Lee (14)
- Highest home attendance: 18,788 vs. Gamba Osaka (24 April 2011)
- Lowest home attendance: 7,099 vs. Nagoya Grampus (13 August 2011)
- Average home league attendance: 13,203
- Biggest win: 4 – 0 vs. Shimizu S-Pulse (h) (30 July 2011)
- Biggest defeat: 0 – 3 vs. Nagoya Grampus (h) (13 August 2011)
Home colours	Away colours	Third colours

The 2011 Sanfrecce Hiroshima season was Sanfrecce Hiroshima's 3rd consecutive season, 17th season overall in J.League Division 1 and 40th overall in the Japanese top flight. It also includes the 2011 J.League Cup, and the 2011 Emperor's Cup.

== Players ==
As of July 22, 2011 Note: Flags indicate national team as defined under FIFA eligibility rules; some limited exceptions apply. Players may hold more than one non-FIFA nationality.

No.	Pos.	Nation	Player
1	GK	JPN	Shusaku Nishikawa
3	DF	JPN	Daiki Nishioka
4	DF	JPN	Hiroki Mizumoto
5	MF	CRO	Ante Tomić
6	MF	JPN	Toshihiro Aoyama
7	MF	JPN	Koji Morisaki
8	MF	JPN	Kazuyuki Morisaki
9	FW	JPN	Tadanari Lee
10	MF	GEO	David Mujiri
11	FW	JPN	Hisato Satō
13	MF	JPN	Issei Takayanagi
14	MF	CRO	Mihael Mikić
15	MF	JPN	Yōjiro Takahagi
16	MF	JPN	Satoru Yamagishi

No.	Pos.	Nation	Player
17	MF	JPN	Kota Hattori
19	DF	JPN	Kohei Morita
20	MF	JPN	Hironori Ishikawa
21	GK	JPN	Yutaro Hara
22	MF	JPN	Tsubasa Yokotake
23	MF	JPN	Kota Sameshima
24	DF	JPN	Ryota Moriwaki
25	FW	JPN	Junya Osaki
26	FW	JPN	Sena Inami
27	MF	JPN	Kohei Shimizu
28	FW	JPN	Takuya Marutani
34	GK	JPN	Hirotsugu Nakabayashi
35	MF	JPN	Koji Nakajima

== Competitions ==
=== J.League ===
==== League table ====
Pos	Team	Pld	W	D	L	GF	GA	GD	Pts
5	Yokohama F. Marinos	34	16	8	10	46	40	+6	56
6	Kashima Antlers	34	13	11	10	53	40	+13	50
7	Sanfrecce Hiroshima	34	14	8	12	52	49	+3	50
8	Júbilo Iwata	34	13	8	13	53	45	+8	47
9	Vissel Kobe	34	13	7	14	44	45	−1	46

Updated to match(es) played on December 3, 2011. Source: J.League Division 1
Rules for classification: 1st points; 2nd goal differential; 3rd goals scored; 4th head-to-head results; 5th disciplinary points; 6th draw. If two clubs are tied for first place, both clubs will be declared.

==== Results summary ====
5 March 2011 Round 1	Sanfrecce Hiroshima	0 – 0	Vegalta Sendai	Hiroshima Big Arch
Saturday 14:00		Report		Attendance: 18,709; Referee: Matsuo

24 April 2011 Round 7	Sanfrecce Hiroshima	4 – 1	Gamba Osaka	Hiroshima Big Arch
Sunday 13:00	Lee 1'; Koji Morisaki 11'; Mikić 36'; Satō 76'	Report	Kawanishi 87'	Attendance: 18,788; Referee: Nishimura

29 April 2011 Round 8	Júbilo Iwata	1 – 1	Sanfrecce Hiroshima	Yamaha Stadium
Friday 19:00	Kanazono 73'	Report	Lee 68'	Attendance: 11,319; Referee: Takayama

3 May 2011 Round 9	Shimizu S-Pulse	0 – 1	Sanfrecce Hiroshima	Outsourcing Stadium Nihondaira
Tuesday 15:00		Report	Mujiri 70'	Attendance: 18,847; Referee: Kashihara

7 May 2011 Round 10	Sanfrecce Hiroshima	1 – 1	Ventforet Kofu	Hiroshima Big Arch
Saturday 13:00	Satō 73'	Report	Havenaar 10'	Attendance: 12,481; Referee: Yoshida

14 May 2011 Round 11	Sanfrecce Hiroshima	3 – 2	Yokohama F. Marinos	Hiroshima Big Arch
Saturday 15:00	Lee 17', 33'; Mujiri 67'	Report	Nakazawa 43'; Nakamura 69'	Attendance: 17,004; Referee: Inoue

21 May 2011 Round 12	Vissel Kobe	1 – 0	Sanfrecce Hiroshima	Home's Stadium Kobe
Saturday 19:00	Tanaka 36'	Report		Attendance: 15,520; Referee: Matsuo

29 May 2011 Round 13	Sanfrecce Hiroshima	2 – 1	Kashima Antlers	Hiroshima Big Arch
Sunday 19:00	Koji Morisaki 9', 90'	Report	Koroki 18'	Attendance: 8,049; Referee: Murakami

11 June 2011 Round 14	Albirex Niigata	0 – 1	Sanfrecce Hiroshima	Tohoku Denryoku Big Swan Stadium
Saturday 13:00		Report	Satō 89'	Attendance: 22,196; Referee: Yoshida

15 June 2011 Round 15	Sanfrecce Hiroshima	0 – 0	Urawa Red Diamonds	Hiroshima Big Arch
Wednesday 19:00		Report		Attendance: 13,707; Referee: Yamamoto

18 June 2011 Round 16	Kawasaki Frontale	2 – 0	Sanfrecce Hiroshima	Todoroki Athletics Stadium
Saturday 19:00	Yajima 35'; Kikuchi 58'	Report		Attendance: 13,605; Referee: Kimura

22 June 2011 Round 17	Sanfrecce Hiroshima	3 – 2	Montedio Yamagata	Hiroshima Big Arch
Wednesday 19:00	Satō 27'; Lee 43'; Koji Morisaki 80'	Report	Ōkubo 33'; Ota 72'	Attendance: 7,593; Referee: Sato

26 June 2011 Round 18	Gamba Osaka	5 – 3	Sanfrecce Hiroshima	Osaka Expo '70 Stadium
Sunday 18:00	Nakazawa 3'; Endō 34'; Hirai 55'; Sasaki 78'; Takagi 85'	Report	Koji Morisaki 45'; Nakajima 74'; Mujiri 90'	Attendance: 16,845; Referee: Murakami

3 July 2011 Round 2^{1}	Omiya Ardija	0 – 1	Sanfrecce Hiroshima	NACK5 Stadium Ōmiya
Sunday 19:00		Report	Morita 49'	Attendance: 8,526; Referee: Nishimura

10 July 2011 Round 3^{1}	Sanfrecce Hiroshima	1 – 3	Cerezo Osaka	Hiroshima Big Arch
Sunday 19:00	Lee 2'	Report	Kurata 33'; Kiyotake 49'; Komatsu 51'	Attendance: 11,615; Referee: Iida

13 July 2011 Round 4^{1}	Kashiwa Reysol	3 – 1	Sanfrecce Hiroshima	Hitachi Kashiwa Soccer Stadium
Wednesday 19:00	Leandro Domingues 19'; Kitajima 55'; Kudo 90'	Report	Satō 7'	Attendance: 7,887; Referee: Yamamoto

18 July 2011 Round 5^{1}	Sanfrecce Hiroshima	0 – 0	Avispa Fukuoka	Hiroshima Big Arch
Monday 18:00		Report		Attendance: 9,864; Referee: Tojo

23 July 2011 Round 6^{1}	Nagoya Grampus	3 – 2	Sanfrecce Hiroshima	Mizuho Athletic Stadium
Saturday 19:00	Tulio 15'; Own goal 67'; Masukawa 80'	Report	Lee 6'; Aoyama 86'	Attendance: 11,904; Referee: Imamura

30 July 2011 Round 19	Sanfrecce Hiroshima	4 – 0	Shimizu S-Pulse	Hiroshima Big Arch
Saturday 19:00	Lee 4', 90'; Own goal 39'; Mujiri 86'	Report		Attendance: 16,816; Referee: Kimura

6 August 2011 Round 20	Ventforet Kofu	0 – 2	Sanfrecce Hiroshima	Yamanashi Chuo Bank Stadium
Saturday 18:30		Report	Lee 19'; Satō 74'	Attendance: 11,193; Referee: Matsuo

13 August 2011 Round 21	Sanfrecce Hiroshima	0 – 3	Nagoya Grampus	Coca-Cola West Hiroshima Stadium
Saturday 19:00		Report	Ogawa 23'; Kennedy 39'; Nagai 90'	Attendance: 7,099; Referee: Murakami

20 August 2011 Round 22	Kashima Antlers	2 – 0	Sanfrecce Hiroshima	Kashima Soccer Stadium
Saturday 18:30	Iwamasa 65'; Nozawa 87'	Report		Attendance: 16,237; Referee: Ogiya

24 August 2011 Round 23	Urawa Red Diamonds	1 – 1	Sanfrecce Hiroshima	Saitama Stadium 2002
Wednesday 19:00	Haraguchi 54'	Report	Lee 58'	Attendance: 27,947; Referee: Imamura

27 August 2011 Round 24	Sanfrecce Hiroshima	1 – 0	Albirex Niigata	Hiroshima Big Arch
Saturday 19:00	Mujiri 81'	Report		Attendance: 14,852; Referee: Sato

10 September 2011 Round 25	Cerezo Osaka	5 – 4	Sanfrecce Hiroshima	Nagai Stadium
Saturday 18:00	Kiyotake 46'; Bando 55', 57', 77'; Kim 72'	Report	Mikić 22'; Takahagi 33'; Satō 44', 90'	Attendance: 20,160; Referee: Nishimura

17 September 2011 Round 26	Sanfrecce Hiroshima	3 – 1	Júbilo Iwata	Hiroshima Big Arch
Saturday 19:00	Lee 3', 57'; Satō 20'	Report	Maeda 25'	Attendance: 11,894; Referee: Inoue

25 September 2011 Round 27	Avispa Fukuoka	2 – 1	Sanfrecce Hiroshima	Level-5 Stadium
Sunday 16:00	Sueyoshi 40'; Naruoka 75'	Report	Mizumoto 90'	Attendance: 12,540; Referee: Murakami

1 October 2011 Round 28	Sanfrecce Hiroshima	1 – 0	Vissel Kobe	Hiroshima Big Arch
Saturday 13:30	Nakajima 90'	Report		Attendance: 12,706; Referee: Maeda

15 October 2011 Round 29	Yokohama F. Marinos	1 – 1	Sanfrecce Hiroshima	Nissan Stadium
Saturday 15:00	Oguro 75'	Report	Mujiri 87'	Attendance: 20,174; Referee: Takayama

22 October 2011 Round 30	Sanfrecce Hiroshima	1 – 3	Kashiwa Reysol	Hiroshima Big Arch
Saturday 14:00	Lee 57'	Report	Jorge Wagner 68'; Kitajima 82', 87'	Attendance: 14,450; Referee: Tojo

29 October 2011 Round 31	Vegalta Sendai	0 – 0	Sanfrecce Hiroshima	Yurtec Stadium Sendai
Saturday 17:00		Report		Attendance: 17,215; Referee: Okabe

19 November 2011 Round 32	Sanfrecce Hiroshima	2 – 3	Kawasaki Frontale	Hiroshima Big Arch
Saturday 14:00	Takahagi 10'; Moriwaki 67'	Report	Kobayashi 45'; Yokoyama 84'; Yajima 90'	Attendance: 12,041; Referee: Inoue

26 November 2011 Round 33	Sanfrecce Hiroshima	4 – 2	Omiya Ardija	Hiroshima Big Arch
Saturday 17:30	Tomić 41'; Satō 45'; Lee 64'; Aoyama 71'	Report	Kanazawa 56'; Lee Chun-Soo 88'	Attendance: 16,779; Referee: Kimura

3 December 2011 Round 34	Montedio Yamagata	1 – 3	Sanfrecce Hiroshima	ND Soft Stadium Yamagata
Saturday 15:30	Miyazaki 11'	Report	Moriwaki 54'; Satō 76'; Yamagishi 88'	Attendance: 7,016; Referee: Iida

^{1}Game postponed because of Tōhoku earthquake.

==== Results by round ====
Round	1	2	3	4	5	6	7	8	9	10	11	12	13	14	15	16	17	18	19	20	21	22	23	24	25	26	27	28	29	30	31	32	33	34
Ground	H	A	H	A	H	A	H	A	A	H	H	A	H	A	H	A	H	A	H	A	H	A	A	H	A	H	A	H	A	H	A	H	H	A
Result	D																																	
Position	11																																	

Updated to match(es) played on 6 March 2011. Source: "World-Football.net".
A = Away; H = Home; W = Win; D = Draw; L = Loss

=== J.League Cup ===
5 June 2011 First round, 1st leg	Sanfrecce Hiroshima	2 – 2	Kawasaki Frontale	Hiroshima Big Arch
Sunday 15:00	Hattori 41'; Mujiri 61'	Report	Yamase 2'; Komiyama 88'	Attendance: 12,498; Referee: Kashihara

27 July 2011 First round, 2nd leg	Kawasaki Frontale	3 – 1	Sanfrecce Hiroshima	Todoroki Athletics Stadium
Wednesday 19:00	Kobayashi 10', 62'; Noborizato 54'	Report	Satō 39'	Attendance: 11,067; Referee: Nakamura

Sanfrecce Hiroshima lost 5-3 on aggregate

=== Emperor's Cup ===
8 October 2011 Second Round	Sanfrecce Hiroshima	4 – 2	Zweigen Kanazawa	Coca-Cola West Hiroshima Stadium
Saturday 15:00	Satō 2', 86'; Yokotake 30'; Mizumoto 45'	Report	Yamane 15'; Hirabayashi 23'	Attendance: 3,858; Referee: Nishimura

16 November 2011 Third Round	Sanfrecce Hiroshima	0 – 1	Ehime FC	Hiroshima Big Arch
Wednesday 19:00		Report	Ishii 86'	Attendance: 3,171; Referee: Yoshida
