= 2008 Japanese Super Cup =

Kashima Antlers	Sanfrecce Hiroshima
2	2
- Date: March 1, 2008
- Venue: National Stadium, Tokyo
- Attendance: 27,245

2008 Japanese Super Cup was the Japanese Super Cup competition. The match was played at National Stadium in Tokyo on March 1, 2008. Sanfrecce Hiroshima won the championship.

== Match details ==
March 1, 2008
13:35

Kashima Antlers	2–2	Sanfrecce Hiroshima
Motoyama 49'; Nozawa 52'	Report	Kubo 80'; Satō 85'
Penalties
Marquinhos (penalty scored); Chugo (penalty scored); Danilo (penalty missed); Motoyama (penalty missed); Ogasawara (penalty scored)	3–4	(penalty scored) Morisaki; (penalty scored) Stoyanov; (penalty scored) Makino; (penalty missed) Jukić; (penalty scored) Satō

National Stadium
Attendance: 27,245
Referee: Masaaki Iemoto
