= Kozo Yuki =

Japanese footballer

Kozo Yuki 結城 耕造
Personal information
- Full name: Kozo Yuki
- Date of birth: 23 January 1979 (age 47)
- Place of birth: Yokohama, Kanagawa, Japan
- Height: 1.85 m (6 ft 1 in)
- Position: Defender

Youth career
- 1994–1996: Yokohama Flügels

College career
Years	Team	Apps	(Gls)
1998–2001	Waseda University		

Senior career*
Years	Team	Apps	(Gls)
2002–2008	JEF United Chiba	47	(1)
2008	Sanfrecce Hiroshima	19	(0)
2009–2010	Fortuna Düsseldorf	2	(0)
Total		68	(1)
Medal record
JEF United Chiba
Winner	J.League Cup	2005
Winner	J.League Cup	2006
- * Club domestic league appearances and goals

Kozo Yuki (結城 耕造, Yuki Kozo; born 23 January 1979) is a former Japanese football player.

== Club career ==
Kozo began his career with Yokohama Flügels and played later for the Waseda University. In 2002, he left Waseda University. He was now scouted by J1 League club JEF United Ichihara (later JEF United Chiba). He debuted in 2003 and played many matches as center back from 2004. JEF United won the champions in 2005 and 2006 J.League Cup. However he could hardly play in the match from 2007. After seven years for JEF United, he moved to J2 League club Sanfrecce Hiroshima in June 2008. He played many matches as substitute defender and Sanfrecce won the champions in 2008 J2 League. However he resigned at the end the of 2008 season. After a half-year blank, on 20 July 2009, the 2. Bundesliga club Fortuna Düsseldorf signed the Japanese defender until the end of the year.

== Club statistics ==
Club performance			League		Cup		League Cup		Total	
Season	Club	League	Apps	Goals	Apps	Goals	Apps	Goals	Apps	Goals
Japan			League		Emperor's Cup		J.League Cup		Total	
2002	JEF United Ichihara	J1 League	0	0	0	0	0	0	0	0
2003	JEF United Ichihara	J1 League	4	0	3	0	2	0	9	0
2004	JEF United Ichihara	J1 League	11	0	0	0	3	0	14	0
2005	JEF United Chiba	J1 League	20	0	2	0	9	0	31	0
2006	JEF United Chiba	J1 League	9	1	0	0	3	0	12	1
2007	JEF United Chiba	J1 League	1	0	0	0	0	0	1	0
2008	JEF United Chiba	J1 League	2	0	0	0	1	0	3	0
2008	Sanfrecce Hiroshima	J2 League	19	0	0	0	-		19	0
Germany			League		DFB-Pokal		Other		Total	
2009/10	Fortuna Düsseldorf	2. Bundesliga	2	0	0	0	0	0	2	0
Total	Japan		66	1	5	0	18	0	89	1
Total	Germany		2	0	0	0	0	0	2	0
Career total			68	1	5	0	18	0	91	1
