= Hisato Satō =

Japanese footballer

Hisato Sato 佐藤 寿人
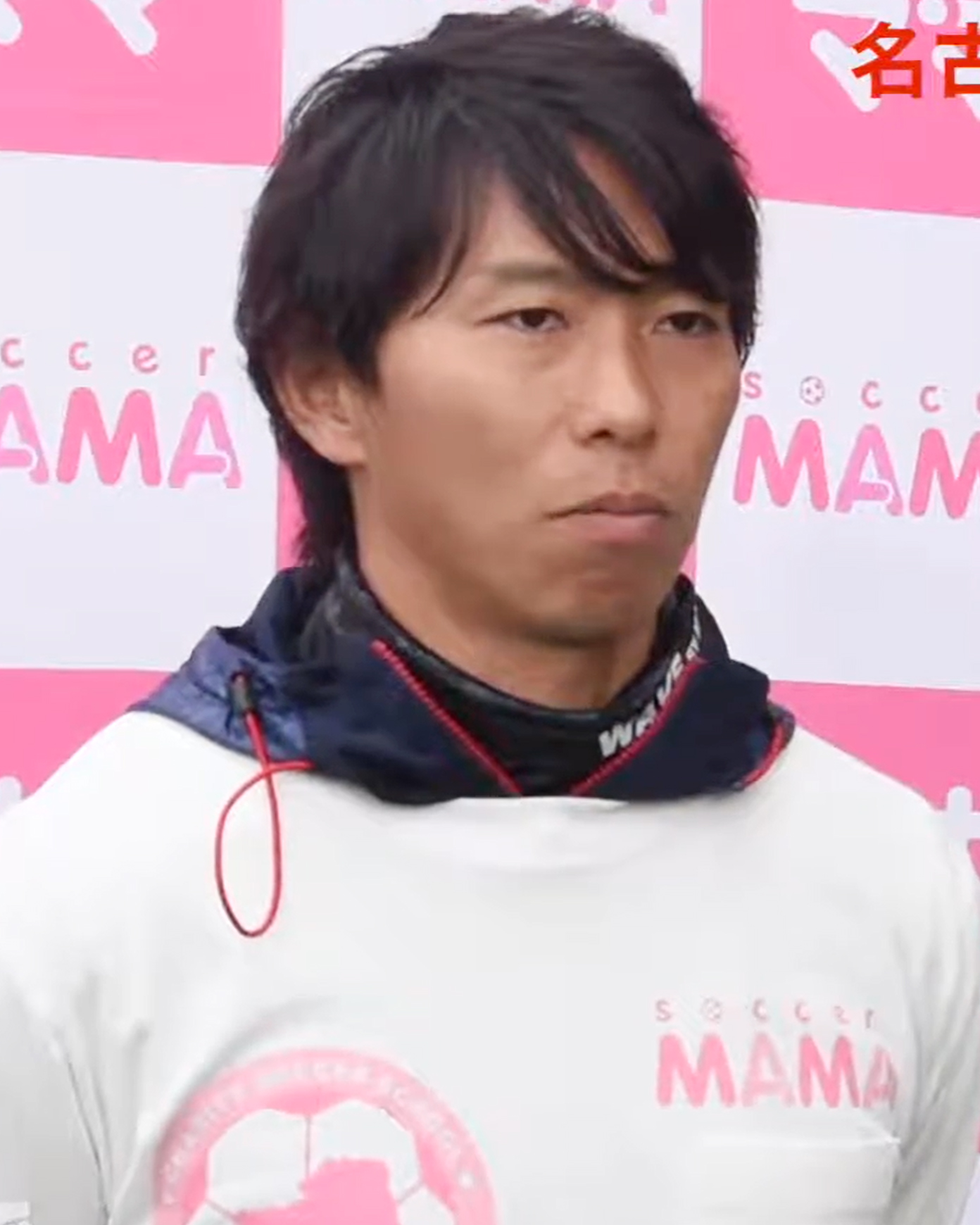
- Sato in 2019

Personal information
- Full name: Hisato Sato
- Date of birth: March 12, 1982 (age 44)
- Place of birth: Kasukabe, Saitama, Japan
- Height: 1.70 m (5 ft 7 in)
- Position: Forward

Youth career
- 1994–1999: JEF United Ichihara

Senior career*
Years	Team	Apps	(Gls)
2000–2001	JEF United Ichihara	22	(2)
2002–2004	Cerezo Osaka	13	(2)
2003–2004	→ Vegalta Sendai (loan)	74	(29)
2005–2016	Sanfrecce Hiroshima	383	(178)
2017–2018	Nagoya Grampus	37	(5)
2019–2020	JEF United Chiba	31	(4)
Total		529	(216)

International career
2000–2001	Japan U-20	8	(5)
2006–2010	Japan	31	(4)
Medal record
Sanfrecce Hiroshima
Winner	J1 League	2012
Winner	J1 League	2013
Winner	J1 League	2015
Runner-up	J.League Cup	2010
Runner-up	J.League Cup	2014
Runner-up	Emperor's Cup	2007
Runner-up	Emperor's Cup	2013
Representing Japan
AFC U-19 Championship
Silver medal – second place	2000 Iran
- * Club domestic league appearances and goals

Hisato Sato (佐藤 寿人, Satō Hisato; born March 12, 1982) is a Japanese former football player. He played as a forward for the Japan national team. His brother Yuto Sato is also a footballer.

== Club career ==
Born in Kasukabe, Saitama, Japan, Sato is a product of JEF United Ichihara's youth system. He was promoted to JEF's top team in 2000. His first league appearance came on April 15, 2000, against Júbilo Iwata. He scored his first league goal on March 21, 2001, against Júbilo Iwata.

Frustrated with a lack of playing time, Sato decided to move to J2 League side Cerezo Osaka in 2002. Cerezo's coach Akihiro Nishimura rated him highly, as he had also managed Sato for Japan's youth team the previous year. However, Sato suffered from Guillain–Barré syndrome at the beginning of the season, and found himself playing not many games with Akinori Nishizawa and Yoshito Okubo ahead of him in the pecking order. The club finished 2nd and was promoted to J1 League.

Sato was loaned out to J1 side Vegalta Sendai in the 2003 season. He finally became a first-choice forward, playing 30 games and scoring 9 goals. Despite his efforts, Sendai was relegated to J2. His loan contract became a permanent one and he played 44 league games with 20 goals for Sendai in the 2005 season but failed to navigate the club to J1.

He was transferred to J1 side Sanfrecce Hiroshima in the 2005 season. He scored 18 goals during his first season with the club, including two hat-tricks.

On April 22, 2006, Sato set the record for the fastest goal in J1 League history, scoring just 8 seconds after kick-off against Cerezo Osaka.

On November 22, 2015, he equalled Masashi Nakayama as the all-time top-scorer in the J1 League with 157 goals. After equalling the record, having spent 12 years in Hiroshima, Sato decided to sign for J2 club Nagoya Grampus.

Grampus finished at the 3rd place in 2017 season and was promoted to J1. Although Sato played many matches in 2017, he could not play many matches in 2018.

In 2019, Sato re-joined J2 club JEF United Chiba (formerly JEF United Ichihara) for the first time in 18 years. He retired at the end of the 2020 season.

== International career ==
In June 2001, Sato made the Japan U-20 national team squad for the 2001 World Youth Championship. At this tournament, he played 2 matches.

Sato made his international debut for Japan on February 11, 2006, in a friendly against the United States. He scored his first international goal on February 22, 2006, in a 2007 Asian Cup qualification against India. In the run-up to the 2006 World Cup, he was regularly picked for the Japan national team, but he was left out of the final squad by national coach Zico.

Sato was a member of the Japan team for the 2007 Asian Cup finals and played four games in the tournament, all as a substitute. He played 31 games and scored 4 goals for Japan until 2010.

== Style of play ==
Sato has cited Filippo Inzaghi as his inspiration; his playing style has often been described as being similar to that of the Italian former striker.

== Personal life ==
His twin brother Yuto is also a professional footballer who plays for JEF United Chiba and has been capped once at international level.

== Career statistics ==
=== Club ===
As of end of 2018 season

Appearances and goals by club, season and competition
Club	Season	League			Emperor's Cup		J.League Cup		AFC Champions League		Other (Note: Includes J1/J2 Play-offs, Japanese Super Cup, FIFA Club World Cup and J.League Championship.)		Total	
Club	Season	Division	Apps	Goals	Apps	Goals	Apps	Goals	Apps	Goals	Apps	Goals	Apps	Goals
JEF United Ichihara	2000	J1 League	8	0	3	0	4	2	–		–		15	2
JEF United Ichihara	2001	J1 League	14	2	0	0	3	1	–		–		17	3
Cerezo Osaka	2002	J2 League	13	2	4	3	–		–		–		17	5
Vegalta Sendai	2003	J1 League	30	9	1	0	6	4	–		–		37	13
Vegalta Sendai	2004	J2 League	44	20	2	0	–		–		–		46	20
Sanfrecce Hiroshima	2005	J1 League	32	18	2	0	6	2	–		–		40	20
Sanfrecce Hiroshima	2006	J1 League	33	18	2	2	4	2	–		–		39	22
Sanfrecce Hiroshima	2007	J1 League	34	12	5	1	6	1	–		2	0	47	14
Sanfrecce Hiroshima	2008	J2 League	40	28	2	2	–		–		1	1	42	30
Sanfrecce Hiroshima	2009	J1 League	34	15	1	1	5	5	–		–		40	21
Sanfrecce Hiroshima	2010	J1 League	27	10	0	0	2	1	6	1	–		35	12
Sanfrecce Hiroshima	2011	J1 League	33	11	2	2	2	1	–		–		37	14
Sanfrecce Hiroshima	2012	J1 League	34	22	1	1	6	3	–		3	3	44	29
Sanfrecce Hiroshima	2013	J1 League	34	17	6	2	2	1	3	0	1	1	46	21
Sanfrecce Hiroshima	2014	J1 League	29	11	2	1	5	5	0	0	1	0	37	17
Sanfrecce Hiroshima	2015	J1 League	34	12	2	0	1	0	0	0	5	0	44	12
Sanfrecce Hiroshima	2016	J1 League	19	4	1	0	2	0	2	0	1	1	24	5
Nagoya Grampus	2017	J2 League	28	5	3	1	–		–		2	0	33	6
Nagoya Grampus	2018	J1 League	9	0	2	0	3	1	–		–		14	1
JEF United Chiba	2019	J2 League					–		–					
Career total			529	216	41	16	57	29	11	1	16	6	654	268

=== International ===
Appearances and goals by national team and year
National team	Year	Apps	Goals
Japan	2006	12	3
Japan	2007	7	0
Japan	2008	6	0
Japan	2009	3	1
Japan	2010	3	0
Total		31	4

As of November 18, 2009

#	Date	Venue	Opponent	Score	Result	Competition
1.	February 22, 2006	International Stadium Yokohama, Yokohama, Japan	India	6-0	Won	2007 AFC Asian Cup qualification
2.	March 30, 2006	Ōita Stadium, Ōita, Japan	Ecuador	1-0	Won	Friendly Match
3.	August 16, 2006	Niigata Stadium, Niigata, Japan	Yemen	2-0	Won	2007 AFC Asian Cup qualification
4.	November 18, 2009	Hong Kong Stadium, Hong Kong	Hong Kong	4-0	Won	2011 AFC Asian Cup qualification

== Honors ==
Sanfrecce Hiroshima

- J1 League: 2012, 2013, 2015
- J2 League: 2008
- Japanese Super Cup: 2008, 2013, 2014, 2016

Individual

- J1 League Best Eleven: 2005, 2012
- J2 League: Top scorer: 2008
- J1 League: Top scorer: 2012
- J.League Most Valuable Player: 2012
