= Ryota Moriwaki =

Japanese footballer (born 1986)

Ryota Moriwaki 森脇 良太
Personal information
- Full name: Ryota Moriwaki
- Date of birth: 6 April 1986 (age 40)
- Place of birth: Fukuyama, Hiroshima, Japan
- Height: 1.78 m (5 ft 10 in)
- Position: Centre back

Youth career
- 2002–2004: Sanfrecce Hiroshima

Senior career*
Years	Team	Apps	(Gls)
2005–2012	Sanfrecce Hiroshima	141	(13)
2006–2007	→ Ehime FC (loan)	79	(4)
2013–2019	Urawa Red Diamonds	182	(11)
2020–2021	Kyoto Sanga	23	(0)
2022–2024	Ehime FC	8	(0)

International career
2011–2013	Japan	3	(0)
Medal record
Sanfrecce Hiroshima
Winner	J1 League	2012
Runner-up	J.League Cup	2010
Urawa Red Diamonds
Winner	AFC Champions League	2017
Runner-up	J1 League	2014
Runner-up	J1 League	2016
Winner	J.League Cup	2016
Runner-up	J.League Cup	2013
Winner	Emperor's Cup	2018
Runner-up	Emperor's Cup	2015
Representing Japan
AFC Asian Cup
Gold medal – first place	2011 Qatar
- * Club domestic league appearances and goals as of 11:54, 20 November 2022 (UTC)

Ryota Moriwaki (森脇 良太, Moriwaki Ryōta; born 6 April 1986) is a Japanese football player who plays for Ehime FC.

== National team career ==
He was selected in the national squad for the 2011 Asian Cup finals as a late replacement for injured Gotoku Sakai.

== Career statistics ==
=== Club ===
As of end of 2018 season

Club	Season	League		Emperor's Cup		J.League Cup		AFC		Other^{1}		Total	
Club	Season	Apps	Goals	Apps	Goals	Apps	Goals	Apps	Goals	Apps	Goals	Apps	Goals
Sanfrecce Hiroshima Youth	2003	-		1	0	-		-		-		1	0
Sanfrecce Hiroshima	2004	0	0	0	0	1	0	-		-		1	0
Sanfrecce Hiroshima	2005	0	0	0	0	1	0	-		-		1	0
Ehime FC	2006	42	3	1	0	-		-		-		43	3
Ehime FC	2007	37	1	3	0	-		-		-		40	1
Sanfrecce Hiroshima	2008	21	5	3	1	-		-		1	0	25	6
Sanfrecce Hiroshima	2009	29	2	1	0	4	0	-		-		34	2
Sanfrecce Hiroshima	2010	31	0	2	1	5	0	5	0	-		43	1
Sanfrecce Hiroshima	2011	27	2	0	0	1	0	-		-		28	2
Sanfrecce Hiroshima	2012	33	4	1	0	4	0	-		2	0	40	4
Urawa Red Diamonds	2013	33	3	0	0	5	0	5	0	-		43	3
Urawa Red Diamonds	2014	33	3	1	0	7	0	-		-		41	3
Urawa Red Diamonds	2015	31	2	3	0	2	0	4	1	2	0	42	3
Urawa Red Diamonds	2016	35	1	1	0	5	0	7	0	2	0	50	1
Urawa Red Diamonds	2017	26	0	1	0	1	0	8	1	3	0	39	1
Urawa Red Diamonds	2018	11	0	3	0	2	0	-		-		16	0
Career total		389	26	21	2	38	0	29	2	10	0	487	30

^{1}Includes Japanese Super Cup, J.League Championship and FIFA Club World Cup.

=== International ===
National team	Year	Apps	Goals
Japan
Japan	2011	1	0
Japan	2012	1	0
Japan	2013	1	0
Total		3	0

International appearances and goals
#	Date	Venue	Opponent	Result	Goal	Competition
2011
	29 March	Nagai Stadium, Osaka, Japan	(Japan) Selection of J. League	2–1	0	Tōhoku earthquake Charity Match
1.	1 June	Niigata Stadium, Niigata, Japan	Peru	0–0	0	2011 Kirin Cup
2012
2.	24 February	Nagai Stadium, Osaka, Japan	Iceland	3–1	0	Friendly

== Honours ==
=== Club ===
Sanfrecce Hiroshima

- J1 League (1) : 2012
- J2 League (1) : 2008
- Japanese Super Cup (1) : 2008

Urawa Reds

- AFC Champions League (1): 2017
- J.League Cup (1): 2016

=== Japan ===
- AFC Asian Cup (1) : 2011
- EAFF East Asian Cup (1) : 2013
