= Kazuyuki Toda =

Japanese footballer (born 1977)

Kazuyuki Toda 戸田 和幸
Personal information
- Date of birth: 30 December 1977 (age 48)
- Place of birth: Sagamihara, Kanagawa, Japan
- Height: 1.78 m (5 ft 10 in)
- Positions: Midfielder; defender

Youth career
- 1993–1995: Toin Gakuen High School

Senior career*
Years	Team	Apps	(Gls)
1996–2004	Shimizu S-Pulse	175	(2)
2003	→ Tottenham Hotspur (loan)	4	(0)
2004	→ ADO Den Haag (loan)	16	(0)
2005	Tokyo Verdy	23	(0)
2006–2008	Sanfrecce Hiroshima	62	(2)
2008	JEF United Chiba	12	(0)
2009	Gyeongnam	6	(0)
2010–2011	Thespa Kusatsu	23	(2)
2012	Machida Zelvia	2	(0)
2013	Warriors	17	(0)
Total		340	(6)

International career
1993	Japan U17	4	(0)
1997	Japan U20	5	(0)
2001–2002	Japan	20	(1)

Managerial career
- 2023–2024: SC Sagamihara
Medal record
Men's football
Representing Japan
FIFA Confederations Cup
Runner-up	2001 Korea/Japan
- * Club domestic league appearances and goals

Kazuyuki Toda (戸田 和幸, Toda Kazuyuki; born 30 December 1977) is a Japanese professional football manager and former player who played as a midfielder or defender. He played for the Japan national team until 2002.

== Club career ==
Toda was born in Sagamihara on 30 December 1977. After graduating from high school, he joined Shimizu S-Pulse in 1996. He played many matches as left defender. The club won 1999–2000 Asian Cup Winners' Cup. In 2001, he was converted to defensive midfielder as Santos successor. The club won the champions 2001 Emperor's Cup. In 2003, he moved to England on loan with Tottenham Hotspur, but only played four games for the team. In 2004, he moved to Netherlands club ADO Den Haag. In July, he returned to Shimizu S-Pulse. In 2005, he moved to Tokyo Verdy. However the club relegated to J2 League and he moved to Sanfrecce Hiroshima in 2006. The club was relegated to J2 League and his opportunity to play decreased in 2008 and he moved to JEF United Chiba in June 2008. Toward end of his career, he played for Gyeongnam, Thespa Kusatsu, FC Machida Zelvia and Warriors. He retired end of 2013 season.

== Managerial career ==
On 14 November 2022, Toda was announced as manager of J3 League club SC Sagamihara for the 2023 season. In June 2024, he was dismissed after the 17th matchweek with the team in 9th place.

== International career ==
In August 1993, Toda was selected Japan U17 national team for 1993 U-17 World Championship. He played all four matches. In June 1997, he was also selected Japan U20 national team for 1997 World Youth Championship. He played full-time in all five matches as left defender of three backs defense.

In February 2001, Toda was selected Japan national team for 2001 Confederations Cup. At this tournament, on 31 May, he debuted against Canada. He played four matches as defensive midfielder and Japan achieved second place. After this tournament, he played most matches for Japan until 2002 World Cup. At 2002 World Cup, he played the full 90 minutes in all four matches in a defensive midfielder pairing with Junichi Inamoto. He played 20 games and scored 1 goal for Japan until 2002.

== Career statistics ==
=== Club ===
Appearances and goals by club, season and competition
Club	Season	League		National cup		League cup		Continental		Total	
Club	Season	Apps	Goals	Apps	Goals	Apps	Goals	Apps	Goals	Apps	Goals
Shimizu S-Pulse	1996	5	0	0	0	1	0	–		6	0
Shimizu S-Pulse	1997	20	0	3	0	5	0	–		28	0
Shimizu S-Pulse	1998	34	0	5	0	5	0	–		44	0
Shimizu S-Pulse	1999	28	0	3	0	2	0	–		33	0
Shimizu S-Pulse	2000	27	1	5	0	6	0	–		38	1
Shimizu S-Pulse	2001	27	0	5	0	1	0	–		33	0
Shimizu S-Pulse	2002	22	1	3	0	2	0	2	0	29	1
Shimizu S-Pulse	2004	12	0	1	0	2	0	–		15	0
Tottenham Hotspur (loan)	2002–03	4	0	0	0	0	0	–		4	0
Tottenham Hotspur (loan)	2003–04	0	0	0	0	0	0	–		0	0
ADO Den Haag (loan)	2003–04	16	0	0	0	–		–		16	0
Tokyo Verdy	2005	23	0	0	0	5	0	–		28	0
Sanfrecce Hiroshima	2006	30	0	1	0	5	0	–		36	0
Sanfrecce Hiroshima	2007	31	2	2	0	8	0	–		41	2
Sanfrecce Hiroshima	2008	1	0	0	0	–		–		1	0
JEF United Chiba	2008	12	0	1	0	1	0	–		14	0
Gyeongnam	2009	6	0	1	0	1	0	–		8	0
Thespa Kusatsu	2010	12	1	0	0	–		–		12	1
Thespa Kusatsu	2011	11	1	1	0	–		–		12	1
FC Machida Zelvia	2012	2	0	0	0	–		–		2	0
Warriors	2013	17	0	1	0	1	0	–		19	0
Career total		340	6	32	0	45	0	2	0	419	6

=== International ===
Appearances and goals by national team and year
National team	Year	Apps	Goals
Japan	2001	10	0
Japan	2002	10	1
Total		20	1

Scores and results list Japan's goal tally first, score column indicates score after each Toda goal.

List of international goals scored by Kazuyuki Toda
No.	Date	Venue	Opponent	Score	Result	Competition
1	21 March 2002	Osaka, Japan	Ukraine	1–0	1–0	Friendly

== Managerial statistics ==
As of the start from 2023 season.

Managerial record by club and tenure
Team	From	To	Record				
Team	From	To	G	W	D	L	Win %
SC Sagamihara	14 November 2022	19 June 2024	0	0	0	0	—
Total			0	0	0	0	—

== Honours ==
Shimizu S-Pulse

- Emperor's Cup: 2001
- J.League Cup: 1996
- Japanese Super Cup: 2001, 2002
- Asian Cup Winner's Cup: 2000

Tokyo Verdy

- Japanese Super Cup: 2005

Sanfrecce Hiroshima

- Japanese Super Cup: 2008

Japan

- FIFA Confederations Cup runner-up: 2001
