= Mitsuyuki Yoshihiro =

Japanese footballer

Mitsuyuki Yoshihiro 吉弘 充志
Personal information
- Date of birth: May 4, 1985 (age 41)
- Place of birth: Kudamatsu, Japan
- Height: 1.82 m (5 ft 11 1/2 in)
- Position: Defender

Youth career
- 2001–2003: Hiroshima Minami High School

Senior career*
Years	Team	Apps	(Gls)
2004–2007	Sanfrecce Hiroshima	26	(0)
2008–2010	Consadole Sapporo	69	(0)
2011	Ehime FC	8	(1)
2012	Tokyo Verdy	2	(0)
2013	FC Machida Zelvia	5	(0)
2014	Renofa Yamaguchi FC	11	(0)
2015	MIO Biwako Shiga	26	(2)
2016–2017	Maruyasu Okazaki	13	(1)
Total		160	(4)
Medal record
Sanfrecce Hiroshima
Runner-up	Emperor's Cup	2007
Representing Japan
AFC U-19 Championship
Bronze medal – third place	2004 Malaysia
- * Club domestic league appearances and goals

Mitsuyuki Yoshihiro (吉弘 充志, Yoshihiro Mitsuyuki; born May 4, 1985) is a Japanese football coach and former football player who is assistant manager of Japan Football League side Maruyasu Okazaki and who is assistant coach of Thailand U23.

== Club career ==
Yoshihiro was born in Kudamatsu on May 4, 1985. After graduating from high school, he joined Sanfrecce Hiroshima in 2004. He played in the matches as defender from first season. However he could hardly play in the match in 2007 and he moved to Consadole Sapporo in 2008. He played as regular player in 2009. However his opportunity to play decreased in 2010 and he left the club end of 2010 season. From 2011, he played for many clubs in J2 League and Japan Football League; Ehime FC (2011), Tokyo Verdy (2012), FC Machida Zelvia (2013), Renofa Yamaguchi FC (2014), MIO Biwako Shiga (2015) and Maruyasu Okazaki (2016-2017). He retired end of 2017 season.

== National team career ==
In June 2005, Yoshihiro was selected Japan U-20 national team for 2005 World Youth Championship. But he did not play in the match

== Club statistics ==
Club performance			League		Cup		League Cup		Total	
Season	Club	League	Apps	Goals	Apps	Goals	Apps	Goals	Apps	Goals
Japan			League		Emperor's Cup		J.League Cup		Total	
2004	Sanfrecce Hiroshima	J1 League	11	0	0	0	1	0	12	0
2005	Sanfrecce Hiroshima	J1 League	1	0	0	0	0	0	1	0
2006	Sanfrecce Hiroshima	J1 League	11	0	0	0	4	0	15	0
2007	Sanfrecce Hiroshima	J1 League	3	0	1	0	2	0	6	0
2008	Consadole Sapporo	J1 League	9	0	0	0	5	0	14	0
2009	Consadole Sapporo	J2 League	41	0	2	0	-		43	0
2010	Consadole Sapporo	J2 League	19	0	2	0	-		21	0
2011	Ehime FC	J2 League	8	1	0	0	-		8	1
2012	Tokyo Verdy	J2 League	2	0	0	0	-		2	0
2013	FC Machida Zelvia	Football League	5	0	-		-		5	0
2014	Renofa Yamaguchi FC	Football League	11	0	-		-		11	0
2015	MIO Biwako Shiga	Football League	26	2	1	0	-		27	2
2016	Maruyasu Okazaki	Football League	7	1	-		-		7	1
2017	Maruyasu Okazaki	Football League	6	0	0	0	-		6	0
Career total			147	3	6	0	12	0	165	3
