= Tetsuya Ōkubo =

Japanese footballer

Tetsuya Okubo 大久保 哲哉
Personal information
- Full name: Tetsuya Okubo
- Date of birth: March 9, 1980 (age 46)
- Place of birth: Yokosuka, Kanagawa, Japan
- Height: 1.90 m (6 ft 3 in)
- Position: Forward

Team information
- Current team: Fifty Club
- Number: 39

Youth career
- Yokosuka High School
- Komazawa University

Senior career*
Years	Team	Apps	(Gls)
2003–2004	Yokohama FC	37	(4)
2005–2006	Sagawa Express Tokyo	55	(35)
2007	Kashiwa Reysol	2	(0)
2008–2010	Avispa Fukuoka	125	(39)
2011	Montedio Yamagata	20	(4)
2012–2017	Yokohama FC	172	(42)
2014	→ Tochigi SC (loan)	36	(9)
2018	Thespakusatsu Gunma	20	(1)
2019–	Fifty Club	26	(26)
Total		493	(160)
- * Club domestic league appearances and goals as of January 1, 2021

Tetsuya Okubo (大久保 哲哉, Ōkubo Tetsuya; born March 9, 1980) is a Japanese football player.

== Playing career ==
Known by the nickname 'Jumbo' due to his size, he plays primarily as a target-man striker, scoring the majority of his goals with his head. Popular with fans and teammates during his career due to his entertaining personality, he hosted a radio show while at his previous club, Avispa Fukuoka.

On 15 March 2019, Okubo joined Yokohama Fifty Club.

== Club statistics ==
Updated to 23 February 2021.

Club performance			League		Cup		League Cup		Total	
Season	Club	League	Apps	Goals	Apps	Goals	Apps	Goals	Apps	Goals
Japan			League		Emperor's Cup		J.League Cup		Total	
2003	Yokohama FC	J2 League	20	3	1	0	-		21	3
2004	Yokohama FC	J2 League	17	1	0	0	-		17	1
2005	Sagawa Express Tokyo	JFL	23	9	3	3	-		26	12
2006	Sagawa Express Tokyo	JFL	32	26	-		-		32	26
2007	Kashiwa Reysol	J1 League	2	0	0	0	0	0	2	0
2008	Avispa Fukuoka	J2 League	41	14	1	0	-		42	14
2009	Avispa Fukuoka	J2 League	48	16	1	0	-		49	16
2010	Avispa Fukuoka	J2 League	36	9	4	1	-		40	10
2011	Montedio Yamagata	J1 League	20	4	1	0	1	0	22	4
2012	Yokohama FC	J2 League	42	12	2	0	-		44	12
2013	Yokohama FC	J2 League	27	12	1	0	-		28	12
2014	Tochigi SC	J2 League	36	9	1	0	–		37	9
2015	Yokohama FC	J2 League	42	7	2	0	–		44	7
2016	Yokohama FC	J2 League	39	6	3	1	–		42	7
2017	Yokohama FC	J2 League	22	5	1	0	–		23	5
2018	Thespakusatsu Gunma	J3 League	20	1	2	0	-		22	1
2019	Fifty Club	Kanagawa Prefecture; Soccer League	18	18	–		–		18	18
2020	Fifty Club	Kanagawa Prefecture; Soccer League	8	8	–		–		8	8
Career total			493	160	22	5	1	0	517	161
