= Kōji Morisaki =

Japanese footballer

Koji Morisaki 森﨑 浩司
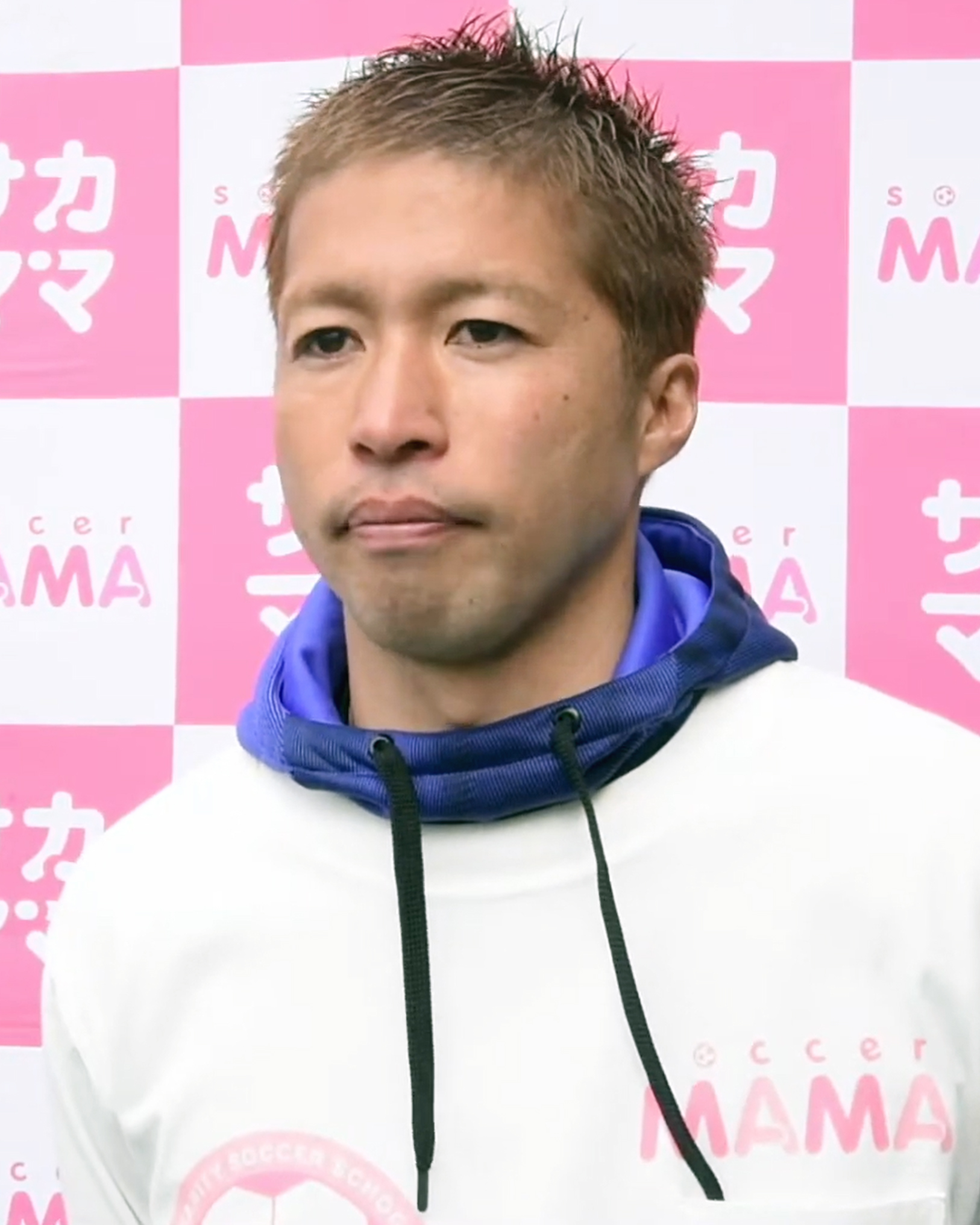
- Morisaki in 2019

Personal information
- Full name: Koji Morisaki
- Date of birth: May 9, 1981 (age 45)
- Place of birth: Hiroshima, Hiroshima, Japan
- Height: 1.77 m (5 ft 10 in)
- Position: Midfielder

Youth career
- 1997–1999: Sanfrecce Hiroshima

Senior career*
Years	Team	Apps	(Gls)
2000–2016	Sanfrecce Hiroshima	335	(65)
Total		335	(65)

International career
2001	Japan U-20	2	(0)
2004	Japan U-23	3	(0)
Medal record
Sanfrecce Hiroshima
Winner	J1 League	2012
Winner	J1 League	2013
Winner	J1 League	2015
Runner-up	J.League Cup	2010
Runner-up	J.League Cup	2014
Runner-up	Emperor's Cup	2007
Runner-up	Emperor's Cup	2013
Representing Japan
AFC U-19 Championship
Silver medal – second place	2000 Iran
- * Club domestic league appearances and goals

Koji Morisaki (森﨑 浩司, Morisaki Kōji; born May 9, 1981) is a former Japanese football player. His twin brother Kazuyuki Morisaki is also a footballer.

== Club career ==
Morisaki was born in Hiroshima on May 9, 1981. He joined Sanfrecce Hiroshima from youth team in 2000. He played many matches as offensive midfielder from 2002 and became a central player of the club with his twin brother Kazuyuki Morisaki. In 2000s, although he played many matches, he suffered from occupational burnout in 2005 and chronic fatigue syndrome in 2009. In 2010s, although his opportunity to play decreased, the club won the champions 2012, 2013 and 2015 J1 League. He retired end of 2016 season.

== National team career ==
In June 2001, Morisaki was selected Japan U-20 national team for 2001 World Youth Championship. At this tournament, he played 2 matches. In August 2004, he was selected Japan U-23 national team for 2004 Summer Olympics. He played all 3 matches.

== Career statistics ==
=== Club ===
Appearances and goals by club, season and competition
Club	Season	League			Emperor's Cup		J.League Cup		Asia		Other^{1}		Total	
Club	Season	Division	Apps	Goals	Apps	Goals	Apps	Goals	Apps	Goals	Apps	Goals	Apps	Goals
Sanfrecce Hiroshima	2000	J1 League	4	0	0	0	2	0	—		—		6	0
Sanfrecce Hiroshima	2001	J1 League	2	2	0	0	1	0	—		—		3	2
Sanfrecce Hiroshima	2002	J1 League	22	6	4	1	5	0	—		—		31	7
Sanfrecce Hiroshima	2003	J2 League	37	10	4	3	—		—		—		41	13
Sanfrecce Hiroshima	2004	J1 League	25	7	1	0	3	0	—		—		29	7
Sanfrecce Hiroshima	2005	J1 League	14	1	0	0	5	0	—		—		19	1
Sanfrecce Hiroshima	2006	J1 League	30	4	2	1	5	3	—		—		37	8
Sanfrecce Hiroshima	2007	J1 League	32	2	5	3	6	0	—		—		43	5
Sanfrecce Hiroshima	2008	J2 League	40	14	4	1	—		—		—		44	15
Sanfrecce Hiroshima	2009	J1 League	3	0	0	0	0	0	—		—		3	0
Sanfrecce Hiroshima	2010	J1 League	27	3	0	0	3	1	4	1	—		34	5
Sanfrecce Hiroshima	2011	J1 League	30	5	1	0	2	0	—		—		33	5
Sanfrecce Hiroshima	2012	J1 League	28	7	1	0	5	2	—		—		34	9
Sanfrecce Hiroshima	2013	J1 League	6	1	0	0	0	0	1	0	4	0	11	1
Sanfrecce Hiroshima	2014	J1 League	21	1	2	0	4	0	2	0	0	0	29	1
Sanfrecce Hiroshima	2015	J1 League	9	1	0	0	3	0	—		0	0	12	1
Sanfrecce Hiroshima	2016	J1 League	5	1	1	0	2	1	1	0	—		9	2
Career total			335	65	25	9	46	7	8	1	4	0	418	82

^{1}Includes Japanese Super Cup, J.League Championship and FIFA Club World Cup.

=== International ===
==== Appearances in major competitions ====
Year	Competition	Category	Appearances		Goals	Team record
Year	Competition	Category	Start	Sub	Goals	Team record
2001	2001 FIFA World Youth Championship	U-20	0	1	0	Round 1
2004	2004 Olympics	U-23	1	2	0	Round 1

== Honors ==
=== Club ===
Sanfrecce Hiroshima

- J1 League: 2012, 2013, 2015
- J2 League: 2008
- Japanese Super Cup: 2008, 2013, 2014, 2016
