= Yuya Hashiuchi =

Japanese footballer (born 1987)

Yuya Hashiuchi 橋内 優也
Personal information
- Full name: Yuya Hashiuchi
- Date of birth: July 13, 1987 (age 39)
- Place of birth: Rittō, Shiga, Japan
- Height: 1.74 m (5 ft 9 in)
- Position: Centre back

Team information
- Current team: Matsumoto Yamaga
- Number: 31

Youth career
- 2003–2005: Tokai University; Daigo High School

Senior career*
Years	Team	Apps	(Gls)
2006–2009	Sanfrecce Hiroshima	4	(0)
2009	Gainare Tottori	10	(4)
2010–2016	Tokushima Vortis	124	(8)
2017–	Matsumoto Yamaga	102	(1)

International career
2005	Japan U-18		
Medal record
Sanfrecce Hiroshima
Runner-up	Emperor's Cup	2007
- * Club domestic league appearances and goals as of 29 December 2019

Yuya Hashiuchi (橋内 優也, Hashiuchi Yūya; born July 13, 1987, in Rittō, Shiga) is a Japanese footballer who plays for Matsumoto Yamaga FC, as a centre back.

== Career ==
Hashiuchi made his senior debut for Sanfrecce Hiroshima on 3 May 2006, at Komaba Stadium against Omiya Ardija. He replaced Hisato Satō after 75 minutes in a 1–0 victory for Hiroshima.

On 1 February 2010, Ossan joined J.League Division 2 side Tokushima Vortis on loan until January 2011. On 17 December 2010, Ossan signed a permanent deal with Tokushima until the end of the season after having his contract cancelled by Hiroshima.

== Career statistics ==
Updated to 24 February 2020.

Club	Season	League		Emperor's Cup		J.League Cup		Total	
Club	Season	Apps	Goals	Apps	Goals	Apps	Goals	Apps	Goals
Sanfrecce Hiroshima	2006	1	0	0	0	2	0	3	0
Sanfrecce Hiroshima	2007	0	0	0	0	0	0	0	0
Sanfrecce Hiroshima	2008	2	0	0	0	–		2	0
Sanfrecce Hiroshima	2009	1	0	0	0	1	1	2	1
Gainare Tottori	2009	10	4	–		–		10	4
Tokushima Vortis	2010	6	0	0	0	–		6	0
Tokushima Vortis	2011	11	0	1	0	–		12	0
Tokushima Vortis	2012	25	3	0	0	–		25	3
Tokushima Vortis	2013	13	1	0	0	–		13	1
Tokushima Vortis	2014	23	2	0	0	1	0	24	2
Tokushima Vortis	2015	17	1	0	0	–		17	1
Tokushima Vortis	2016	29	1	1	0	–		30	1
Matsumoto Yamaga	2017	41	1	0	0	–		41	1
Matsumoto Yamaga	2018	34	0	1	0	–		35	0
Matsumoto Yamaga	2019	27	0	0	0	0	0	27	0
Career total		250	13	3	0	4	1	257	14
