= Kohei Morita =

Japanese footballer (born 1976)

Kohei Morita 盛田 剛平
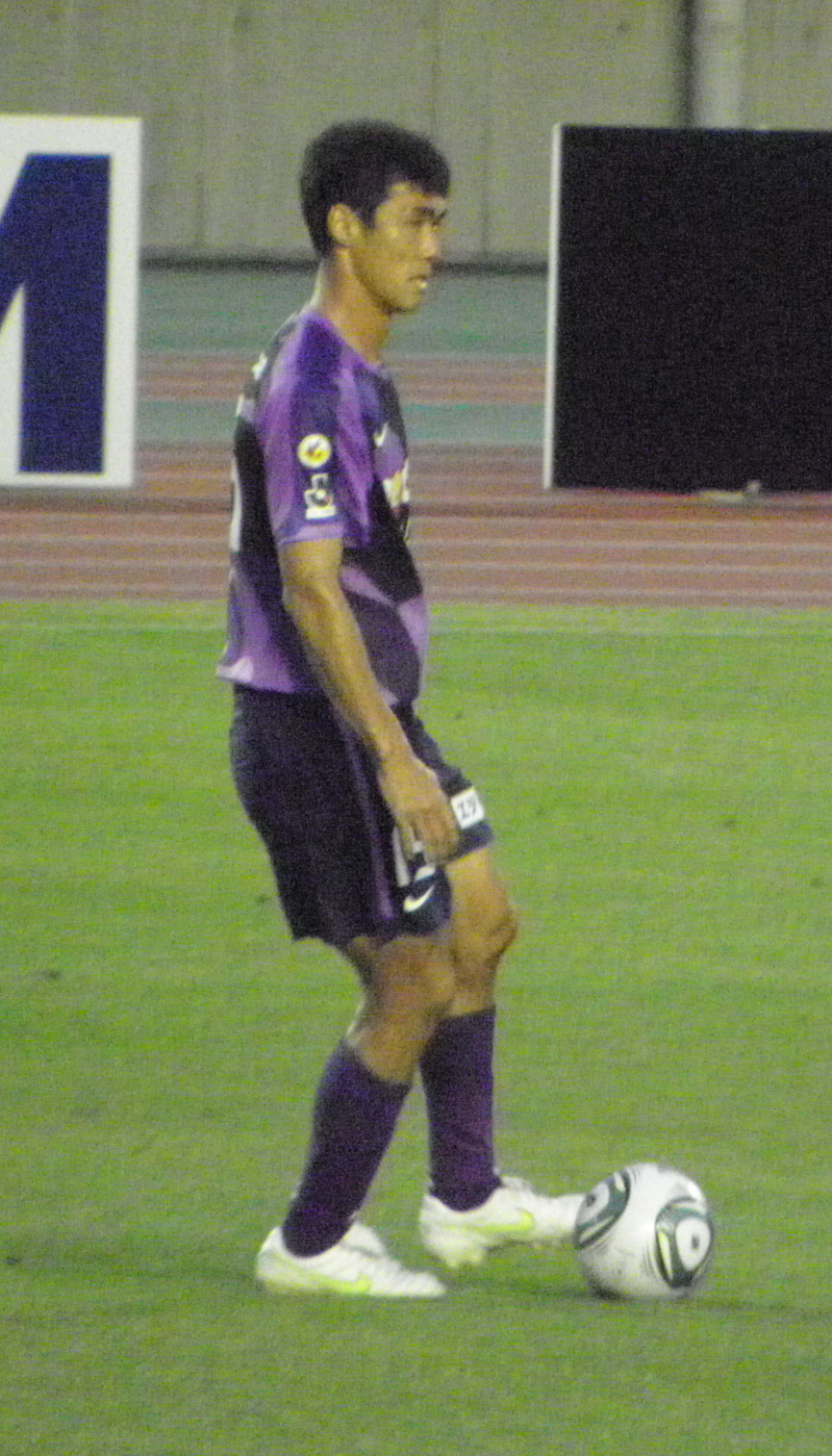

Personal information
- Full name: Kohei Morita
- Date of birth: July 13, 1976 (age 50)
- Place of birth: Nagoya, Japan
- Height: 1.89 m (6 ft 2 1/2 in)
- Positions: Forward; defender

Youth career
- 1992–1994: Toin Gakuen High School
- 1995–1998: Komazawa University

Senior career*
Years	Team	Apps	(Gls)
1999–2000	Urawa Reds	23	(0)
2001	Cerezo Osaka	6	(0)
2001	Kawasaki Frontale	7	(1)
2002–2004	Omiya Ardija	63	(6)
2004–2011	Sanfrecce Hiroshima	105	(4)
2012–2016	Ventforet Kofu	86	(5)
2017	Thespakusatsu Gunma	10	(0)
Total		300	(16)
Medal record
Cerezo Osaka
Runner-up	Emperor's Cup	2001
Sanfrecce Hiroshima
Runner-up	J.League Cup	2010
Runner-up	Emperor's Cup	2007
- * Club domestic league appearances and goals

Kohei Morita (盛田 剛平, Morita Kohei; born July 13, 1976) is a former Japanese football player.

== Playing career ==
Morita was born in Nagoya on July 13, 1976. After graduating from Komazawa University, he joined J1 League club Urawa Reds in 1999. Although initially he played many matches as center forward, he could not score a goal and his opportunity to play decreased. The club was also relegated to J2 League from 2000. In 2001, he played for Cerezo Osaka and Kawasaki Frontale. However he could not play many matches in both clubs. In 2002, he moved to J2 club Omiya Ardija. He played many matches as forward until 2003. However he could hardly play in the match in 2004. In August 2004, he moved to Sanfrecce Hiroshima. Although he played as regular player in 2004, he could hardly play in the match in 2005. In 2006, he was converted to defender and played many matches as left back of three backs defense for long time. The club won the 2nd place 2007 Emperor's Cup. Although he could not play at all in the match for injury in 2010, he came back in 2011 season. In 2012, he moved to J2 club Ventforet Kofu. He became a regular player as center back from the middle of 2012 and the club won the champions in 2012 and was promoted to J1 from 2013. From 2014, he was converted to forward because there were few forward players in the club. However his opportunity to play decreased from 2015. In 2017, he moved to J2 club Thespakusatsu Gunma. He played as forward and retired end of 2017 season at age of 41.

== Career statistics ==
Appearances and goals by club, season and competition
Club	Season	League			Emperor's Cup		J.League Cup		Asia		Total	
Club	Season	Division	Apps	Goals	Apps	Goals	Apps	Goals	Apps	Goals	Apps	Goals
Urawa Reds	1999	J1 League	19	0	1	0	0	0	—		20	0
Urawa Reds	2000	J2 League	4	0	4	6	1	0	—		9	6
Cerezo Osaka	2001	J1 League	6	0	0	0	1	0	—		7	0
Kawasaki Frontale	2001	J2 League	7	1	6	1	0	0	—		13	2
Omiya Ardija	2002	J2 League	32	4	3	1	—		—		35	5
Omiya Ardija	2003	J2 League	28	2	3	0	—		—		31	2
Omiya Ardija	2004	J2 League	3	0	0	0	—		—		3	0
Sanfrecce Hiroshima	2004	J1 League	14	1	1	0	2	1	—		17	2
Sanfrecce Hiroshima	2005	J1 League	3	0	1	0	3	0	—		7	0
Sanfrecce Hiroshima	2006	J1 League	19	0	2	0	4	2	—		25	2
Sanfrecce Hiroshima	2007	J1 League	17	0	5	0	7	0	—		29	0
Sanfrecce Hiroshima	2008	J2 League	16	1	1	0	—		—		17	1
Sanfrecce Hiroshima	2009	J1 League	21	1	1	1	6	0	—		28	2
Sanfrecce Hiroshima	2010	J1 League	0	0	0	0	0	0	0	0	0	0
Sanfrecce Hiroshima	2011	J1 League	15	1	0	0	1	0	—		16	1
Ventforet Kofu	2012	J2 League	25	0	0	0	—		—		25	0
Ventforet Kofu	2013	J1 League	10	0	0	0	5	0	—		15	0
Ventforet Kofu	2014	J1 League	29	5	3	0	4	0	—		36	5
Ventforet Kofu	2015	J1 League	16	0	2	0	6	1	—		24	1
Ventforet Kofu	2016	J1 League	6	0	0	0	1	0	—		7	0
Thespakusatsu Gunma	2017	J2 League	10	0	1	0	—		—		11	0
Career total			300	16	34	9	41	4	0	0	375	29
