= Koichi Kidera =

Japanese footballer

Koichi Kidera 木寺 浩一
Personal information
- Full name: Koichi Kidera
- Date of birth: April 4, 1972 (age 54)
- Place of birth: Hidaka, Saitama, Japan
- Height: 1.79 m (5 ft 10 1/2 in)
- Position: Goalkeeper

Youth career
- 1988–1990: Bunan High School

Senior career*
Years	Team	Apps	(Gls)
1991–1993	NKK	27	(0)
1994–1995	Kyoto Purple Sanga	8	(0)
1996–1997	Honda Luminozo Sayama		
1998–2005	Albirex Niigata	71	(0)
2006–2008	Sanfrecce Hiroshima	23	(0)
2009	Zweigen Kanazawa	14	(0)
Total		143	(0)
Medal record
Sanfrecce Hiroshima
Runner-up	Emperor's Cup	2007
- * Club domestic league appearances and goals

Koichi Kidera (木寺 浩一, Kidera Koichi; born April 4, 1972) is a former Japanese football player.

== Playing career ==
Kidera was born in Hidaka on April 4, 1972. After graduating from high school, he joined the Japan Soccer League club NKK in 1991. In 1992, the Japan Soccer League was dissolved and the club joined the new Japan Football League (JFL). Kidera became a regular goalkeeper in 1992. However he did not play much in 1993 and the club was disbanded at the end of the 1993 season. In 1994, he moved to the JFL club Kyoto Purple Sanga. Although he played for two seasons, he did not participate in many matches. In 1996, he moved to the Regional Leagues club Honda Luminozo Sayama and played for two seasons. In 1998, he moved to the JFL club Albirex Niigata. He played often and the club was promoted to the new J2 League in 1999. He competed with Shinya Yoshihara for a position and played often until 2000. However he played less often than Yosuke Nozawa in 2001. The club won the championship in 2003 and was promoted to the J1 League in 2004. In 2004, he played often during the summer after Nozawa was injured. Although he became a regular goalkeeper in late 2005, he was released from the club for generational change at the end of the 2005 season. In 2006, he moved to the J1 club Sanfrecce Hiroshima. However he did not play as often as Takashi Shimoda and the club was relegated to J2 in 2008. In 2008, he became a regular goalkeeper after Shimoda was hurt. Kidera injured his shoulder in June and could not play at all after the injury. In 2009, he moved to the Regional Leagues club Zweigen Kanazawa. He played often and the club was promoted to the Japan Football League in 2010. However he retired at the end of the 2009 season.

== Career statistics ==
Appearances and goals by club, season and competition
Club	Season	League			Emperor's Cup		J.League Cup		Total	
Club	Season	Division	Apps	Goals	Apps	Goals	Apps	Goals	Apps	Goals
NKK	1990–91	JSL Division 1	2	0	0	0	0	0	2	0
NKK	1991–92	JSL Division 2	7	0			2	0	9	0
NKK	1992	Football League	17	0	0	0	—		17	0
NKK	1993	Football League	1	0	0	0	—		1	0
Kyoto Purple Sanga	1994	Football League	8	0	3	0	—		11	0
Kyoto Purple Sanga	1995	Football League	0	0	0	0	—		0	0
Honda Luminozo Sayama	1996	Regional Leagues								
Honda Luminozo Sayama	1997	Regional Leagues			2	0	—		2	0
Albirex Niigata	1998	Football League	18	0	0	0	—		18	0
Albirex Niigata	1999	J2 League	14	0	0	0	0	0	14	0
Albirex Niigata	2000	J2 League	18	0	3	0	2	0	23	0
Albirex Niigata	2001	J2 League	0	0	0	0	0	0	0	0
Albirex Niigata	2002	J2 League	2	0	1	0	—		3	0
Albirex Niigata	2003	J2 League	0	0	1	0	—		1	0
Albirex Niigata	2004	J1 League	11	0	0	0	0	0	11	0
Albirex Niigata	2005	J1 League	8	0	1	0	0	0	9	0
Sanfrecce Hiroshima	2006	J1 League	1	0	0	0	0	0	1	0
Sanfrecce Hiroshima	2007	J1 League	3	0	0	0	0	0	3	0
Sanfrecce Hiroshima	2008	J2 League	19	0	0	0	—		19	0
Zweigen Kanazawa	2009	Regional Leagues	14	0	0	0	—		14	0
Career total			143	0	11	0	4	0	158	0
