= 2013 Sanfrecce Hiroshima season =

Sanfrecce Hiroshima
2013 season
- Manager: Hajime Moriyasu
- Stadium: Edion Stadium Hiroshima
- J1 League: Champions

2013 Sanfrecce Hiroshima season.

== J1 League ==
=== League table ===
Pos	Team	Pld	W	D	L	GF	GA	GD	Pts	Qualification or relegation
1	Sanfrecce Hiroshima (C)	34	19	6	9	51	29	+22	63	Qualification for 2014 AFC Champions League group stage (Note: The winners of the 2013 Emperor's Cup qualify for the group stage of the 2014 AFC Champions League. As the Emperor's Cup winners were Yokohama F. Marinos, who had already qualified to ACL through the championship, the remaining spot was awarded to the fourth-placed team.)
2	Yokohama F. Marinos	34	18	8	8	49	31	+18	62	Qualification for 2014 AFC Champions League group stage
3	Kawasaki Frontale	34	18	6	10	65	51	+14	60	Qualification for 2014 AFC Champions League group stage
4	Cerezo Osaka	34	16	11	7	53	32	+21	59	Qualification for 2014 AFC Champions League group stage
5	Kashima Antlers	34	18	5	11	60	52	+8	59	

Updated to match(es) played on 7 December 2013. Source: J.League Division 1
Rules for classification: 1) points; 2) goal difference; 3) number of goals scored.
(C) Champions

=== Matches ===
J1 League results
Match	Date	Team	Score	Team	Venue	Attendance
1	2013.03.02	Sanfrecce Hiroshima	1-2	Urawa Reds	Edion Stadium Hiroshima	27,911
2	2013.03.09	Albirex Niigata	1-2	Sanfrecce Hiroshima	Tohoku Denryoku Big Swan Stadium	28,118
3	2013.03.17	Sanfrecce Hiroshima	0-0	Kashima Antlers	Edion Stadium Hiroshima	16,029
4	2013.03.30	Shimizu S-Pulse	0-4	Sanfrecce Hiroshima	IAI Stadium Nihondaira	13,137
5	2013.04.06	Sanfrecce Hiroshima	1-3	Yokohama F. Marinos	Edion Stadium Hiroshima	10,554
6	2013.04.14	Sanfrecce Hiroshima	2-0	Sagan Tosu	Edion Stadium Hiroshima	13,164
7	2013.04.20	Júbilo Iwata	0-2	Sanfrecce Hiroshima	Yamaha Stadium	8,377
8	2013.04.27	Nagoya Grampus	1-1	Sanfrecce Hiroshima	Nagoya Mizuho Athletic Stadium	13,004
10	2013.05.06	Omiya Ardija	2-1	Sanfrecce Hiroshima	NACK5 Stadium Omiya	13,365
11	2013.05.11	Sanfrecce Hiroshima	1-0	Oita Trinita	Edion Stadium Hiroshima	10,708
12	2013.05.18	Sanfrecce Hiroshima	5-1	Ventforet Kofu	Edion Stadium Hiroshima	10,550
13	2013.05.25	Shonan Bellmare	0-2	Sanfrecce Hiroshima	Shonan BMW Stadium Hiratsuka	10,682
9	2013.05.29	Sanfrecce Hiroshima	0-0	Kashiwa Reysol	Edion Stadium Hiroshima	10,045
14	2013.07.06	FC Tokyo	0-1	Sanfrecce Hiroshima	Ajinomoto Stadium	27,852
15	2013.07.10	Sanfrecce Hiroshima	4-2	Kawasaki Frontale	Edion Stadium Hiroshima	10,236
16	2013.07.13	Sanfrecce Hiroshima	1-0	Cerezo Osaka	Edion Stadium Hiroshima	19,244
17	2013.07.17	Vegalta Sendai	0-2	Sanfrecce Hiroshima	Yurtec Stadium Sendai	11,755
18	2013.07.31	Sanfrecce Hiroshima	3-1	Omiya Ardija	Edion Stadium Hiroshima	16,351
19	2013.08.03	Urawa Reds	3-1	Sanfrecce Hiroshima	Saitama Stadium 2002	42,426
20	2013.08.10	Sanfrecce Hiroshima	2-1	Júbilo Iwata	Edion Stadium Hiroshima	19,705
21	2013.08.17	Sanfrecce Hiroshima	1-1	Nagoya Grampus	Edion Stadium Hiroshima	20,879
22	2013.08.24	Oita Trinita	1-1	Sanfrecce Hiroshima	Oita Bank Dome	13,024
23	2013.08.28	Ventforet Kofu	2-0	Sanfrecce Hiroshima	Yamanashi Chuo Bank Stadium	9,033
24	2013.08.31	Sanfrecce Hiroshima	1-2	FC Tokyo	Edion Stadium Hiroshima	13,896
25	2013.09.14	Kawasaki Frontale	2-0	Sanfrecce Hiroshima	Kawasaki Todoroki Stadium	17,390
26	2013.09.21	Sanfrecce Hiroshima	2-0	Albirex Niigata	Edion Stadium Hiroshima	16,196
27	2013.09.28	Sagan Tosu	0-2	Sanfrecce Hiroshima	Best Amenity Stadium	12,355
28	2013.10.05	Sanfrecce Hiroshima	3-1	Shimizu S-Pulse	Edion Stadium Hiroshima	15,512
29	2013.10.19	Yokohama F. Marinos	1-0	Sanfrecce Hiroshima	Nissan Stadium	39,243
30	2013.10.26	Sanfrecce Hiroshima	1-0	Vegalta Sendai	Edion Stadium Hiroshima	17,184
31	2013.11.10	Kashiwa Reysol	1-1	Sanfrecce Hiroshima	Hitachi Kashiwa Stadium	12,103
32	2013.11.23	Cerezo Osaka	1-0	Sanfrecce Hiroshima	Kincho Stadium	17,489
33	2013.11.30	Sanfrecce Hiroshima	1-0	Shonan Bellmare	Edion Stadium Hiroshima	27,392
34	2013.12.07	Kashima Antlers	0-2	Sanfrecce Hiroshima	Kashima Soccer Stadium	26,897
