= Shinichiro Kuwada =

Japanese footballer

Shinichiro Kuwada 桒田 慎一朗
Personal information
- Full name: Shinichiro Kuwada
- Date of birth: December 6, 1986 (age 39)
- Place of birth: Fukuyama, Hiroshima, Japan
- Height: 1.78 m (5 ft 10 in)
- Position: Forward

Youth career
- 2002–2004: Sanfrecce Hiroshima

Senior career*
Years	Team	Apps	(Gls)
2005–2010	Sanfrecce Hiroshima	55	(1)
2011–2013	Fagiano Okayama	46	(2)
2014	Nakhon Ratchasima		
Medal record
Sanfrecce Hiroshima
Runner-up	J.League Cup	2010
Runner-up	Emperor's Cup	2007
- * Club domestic league appearances and goals as of 23 February 2014

Shinichiro Kuwada (桒田 慎一朗, Kuwada Shinichiro; born December 6, 1986) is a former Japanese football player.

== Club statistics ==
Updated to 23 February 2014.

Club performance			League		Cup		League Cup		Continental		Total	
Season	Club	League	Apps	Goals	Apps	Goals	Apps	Goals	Apps	Goals	Apps	Goals
Japan			League		Emperor's Cup		League Cup		Asia		Total	
2005	Sanfrecce Hiroshima	J1 League	8	0	1	0	2	1	-		11	1
2006	Sanfrecce Hiroshima	J1 League	9	0	1	0	3	0	-		13	0
2007	Sanfrecce Hiroshima	J1 League	12	0	1	0	7	1	-		20	1
2008	Sanfrecce Hiroshima	J2 League	14	1	2	0	-		-		16	1
2009	Sanfrecce Hiroshima	J1 League	0	0	0	0	0	0	-		0	0
2010	Sanfrecce Hiroshima	J1 League	12	0	1	1	3	0	2	1	18	2
2011	Fagiano Okayama	J2 League	2	0	0	0	-		-		2	0
2012	Fagiano Okayama	J2 League	21	0	0	0	-		-		21	0
2013	Fagiano Okayama	J2 League	23	2	1	0	-		-		24	2
Career total			101	3	7	1	15	2	2	1	125	7
