= Ilian Stoyanov =

Bulgarian footballer

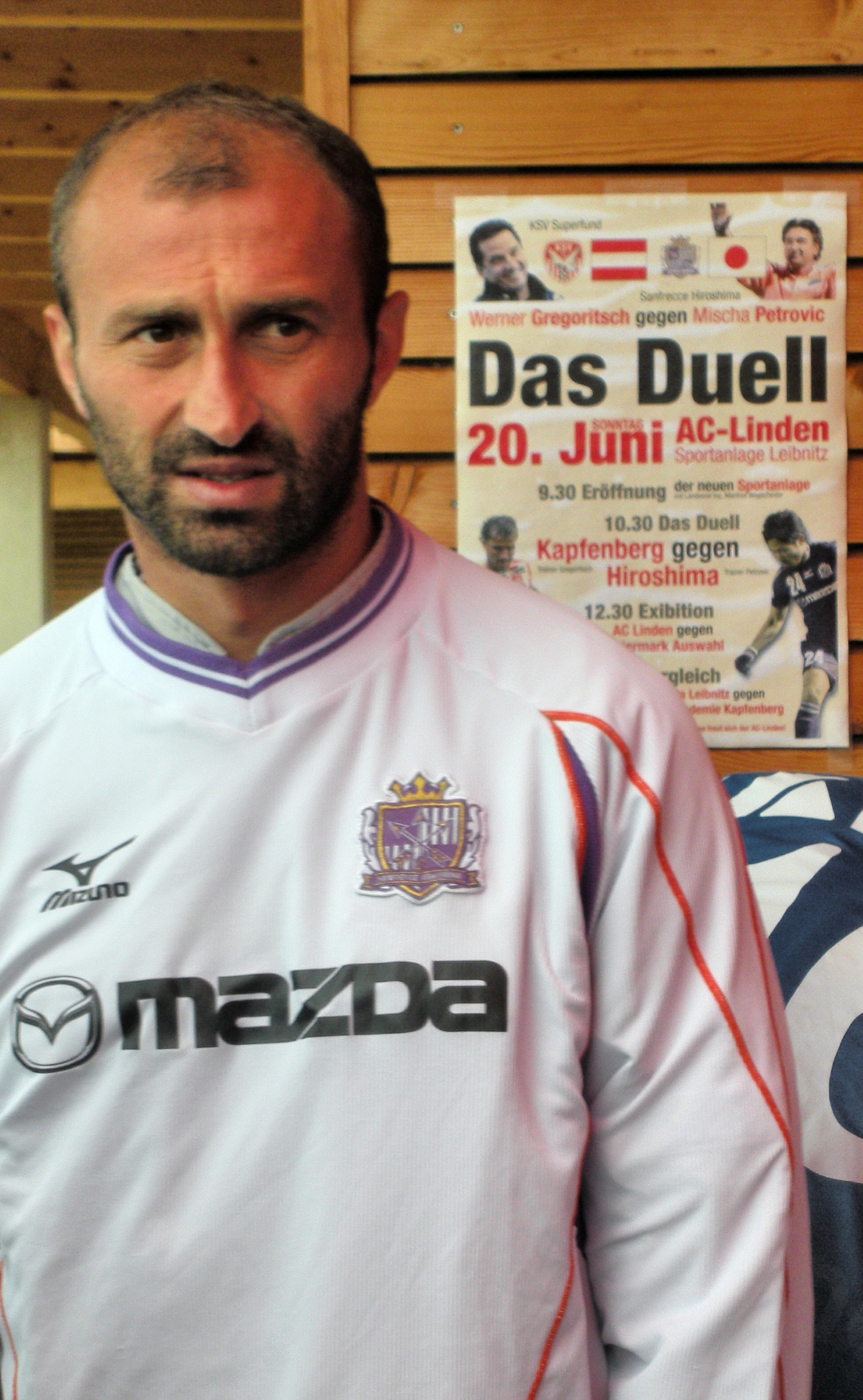
- Stoyanov with Sanfrecce Hiroshima in 2010

Personal information
- Full name: Ilian Stoyanov
- Date of birth: 20 January 1977 (age 49)
- Place of birth: Kyustendil, Bulgaria
- Height: 1.83 m (6 ft 0 in)
- Positions: Centre-back; left-back

Senior career*
| Years | Team | Apps | (Gls) |
| 1995–1996 | CSKA Sofia | 3 | (0) |
| 1996–2000 | Velbazhd Kyustendil | 88 | (3) |
| 2000–2005 | Levski Sofia | 90 | (2) |
| 2005–2007 | JEF United Chiba | 65 | (2) |
| 2007–2010 | Sanfrecce Hiroshima | 85 | (6) |
| 2011 | Fagiano Okayama | 26 | (2) |
| Total | | 357 | (15) |

International career
| 1998–2010 | Bulgaria | 40 | (0) |
- * Club domestic league appearances and goals

Ilian Stoyanov (Bulgarian: Илиaн Стоянов; born 20 January 1977) is a former Bulgarian football defender. In Bulgaria he is also known as Collovati, because of his haircut in the past, reminiscent of that of former Italian midfielder Fulvio Collovati.

== Career ==
He was part of the Bulgarian 2004 European Football Championship team, who exited in the first round, finishing bottom of Group C, having finished top of Qualifying Group 8 in the pre-tournament phase. In the beginning of his career, he played as left-back.

He started his professional career with CSKA Sofia in 1995. However, Stoyanov made a name for himself with Velbazhd Kyustendil and Levski Sofia, appearing in more than 150 matches in the top division. During his time in Bulgarian football, he established himself as a capable defender, but was also notable for displaying a fiery temper on occasions and was involved in a number of controversial incidents, including an altercation with a referee and remarks uttered at black footballers, which invited accusations of racism.

He joined JEF United Chiba in 2005 from Levski Sofia and enjoyed a reasonably successful first season, helping them lift the Yamazaki Nabisco Cup (the Japanese League Cup), the club's first ever trophy – and also to repeat the achievement the following season, 2006. The club released him in July 2007 after he criticised manager Amar Osim. On 12 August 2007, he signed with another Japanese club Sanfrecce Hiroshima. He could not help the team to avoid relegation to J2 in the same season. However, he helped his new team to get to the final of the Emperor's Cup in 2007, and to win the Xerox Super Cup in 2008.

In 2009, he returned to Bulgaria national team and started 7 games in 2010 FIFA World Cup qualification.

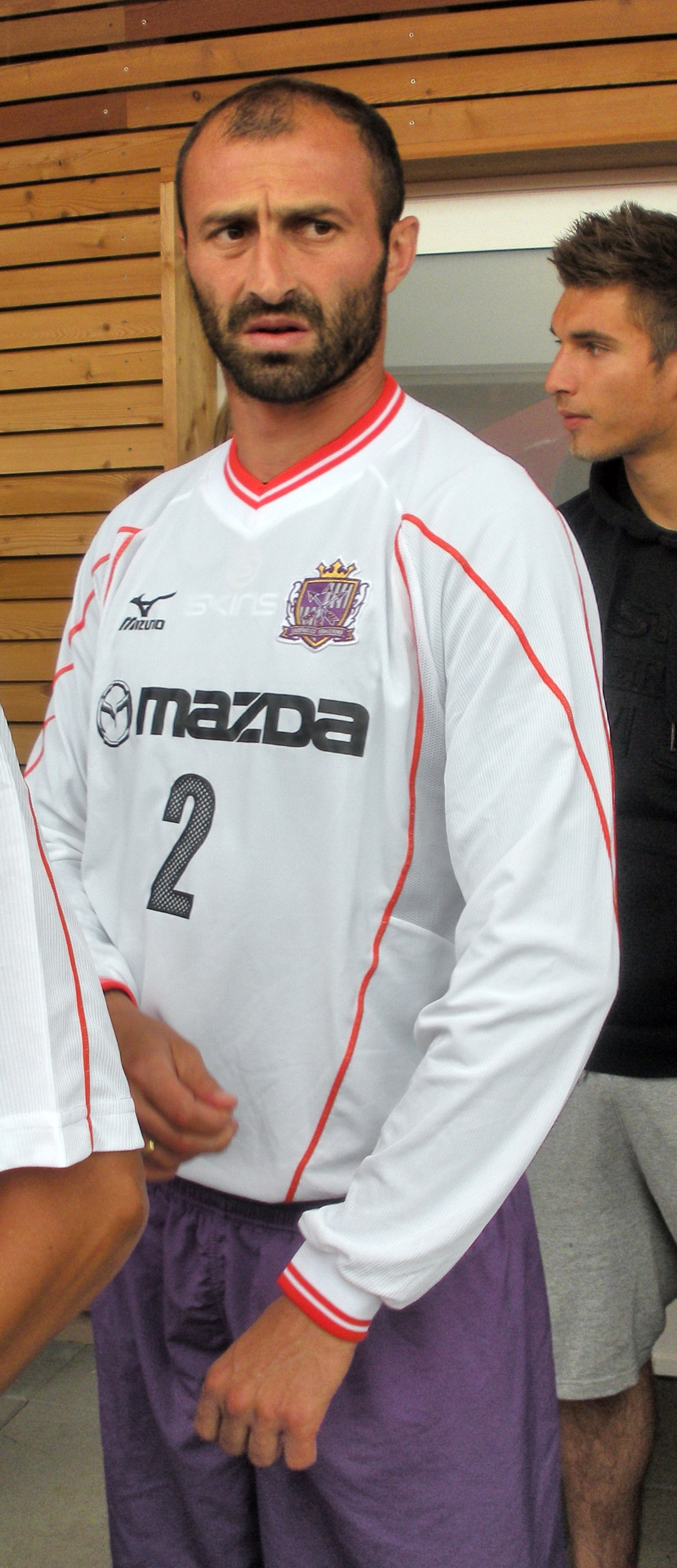
Ilian Stoyanov wearing the jersey of Sanfrecce Hiroshima

After his retirement, Stoyanov has started his own business in Japan and is also involved in a football academy.

== Club statistics ==
| Club performance | | | League | | Cup | | League Cup | | Continental | | Total | |
| Season | Club | League | Apps | Goals | Apps | Goals | Apps | Goals | Apps | Goals | Apps | Goals |
| Bulgaria | | | League | | Bulgarian Cup | | League Cup | | Europe | | Total | |
|---|---|---|---|---|---|---|---|---|---|---|---|---|
| 1995–96 | CSKA Sofia | Bulgarian A PFG | 3 | 0 | | | - | | | | | |
| 1996–97 | Velbazhd Kyustendil | Bulgarian A PFG | 17 | 0 | | | - | | | | | |
| 1997–98 | Velbazhd Kyustendil | Bulgarian A PFG | 27 | 1 | | | - | | | | | |
| 1998–99 | Velbazhd Kyustendil | Bulgarian A PFG | 22 | 1 | | | - | | | | | |
| 1999–00 | Velbazhd Kyustendil | Bulgarian A PFG | 22 | 1 | | | - | | | | | |
| 2000–01 | Levski Sofia | Bulgarian A PFG | 20 | 1 | 5 | 0 | - | | 4 | 0 | 29 | 1 |
| 2001–02 | Levski Sofia | Bulgarian A PFG | 25 | 0 | 5 | 0 | - | | 7 | 0 | 37 | 0 |
| 2002–03 | Levski Sofia | Bulgarian A PFG | 19 | 1 | 8 | 0 | - | | 7 | 0 | 34 | 1 |
| 2003–04 | Levski Sofia | Bulgarian A PFG | 18 | 0 | 0 | 0 | - | | 7 | 0 | 25 | 0 |
| 2004–05 | Levski Sofia | Bulgarian A PFG | 8 | 0 | 1 | 0 | - | | 3 | 0 | 12 | 0 |
| Japan | | | League | | Emperor's Cup | | League Cup | | Asia | | Total | |
| 2005 | JEF United Chiba | J1 League | 30 | 1 | 2 | 0 | 8 | 0 | - | | 40 | 1 |
| 2006 | JEF United Chiba | J1 League | 26 | 0 | 0 | 0 | 10 | 0 | - | | 36 | 0 |
| 2007 | JEF United Chiba | J1 League | 9 | 1 | 0 | 0 | 4 | 0 | - | | 13 | 1 |
| 2007 | Sanfrecce Hiroshima | J1 League | 13 | 0 | 5 | 0 | 0 | 0 | - | | 18 | 0 |
| 2008 | Sanfrecce Hiroshima | J2 League | 32 | 2 | 4 | 0 | - | | - | | 36 | 2 |
| 2009 | Sanfrecce Hiroshima | J1 League | 23 | 4 | 0 | 0 | 3 | 1 | - | | 26 | 5 |
| 2010 | Sanfrecce Hiroshima | J1 League | 17 | 0 | 1 | 0 | 2 | 0 | 3 | 1 | 23 | 1 |
| 2011 | Fagiano Okayama | J2 League | 26 | 2 | 0 | 0 | - | | - | | 26 | 2 |
| Total | Bulgaria | | 181 | 5 | | | - | - | | | | |
| Total | Japan | | 176 | 10 | 12 | 0 | 27 | 10 | 3 | 1 | 218 | 12 |
| Career total | | | 357 | 13 | | | | | | | | |

== National team statistics ==
Bulgaria national team
| Year | Apps | Goals |
|---|---|---|
| 1998 | 2 | 0 |
| 1999 | 5 | 0 |
| 2000 | 4 | 0 |
| 2001 | 2 | 0 |
| 2002 | 1 | 0 |
| 2003 | 5 | 0 |
| 2004 | 9 | 0 |
| 2005 | 3 | 0 |
| 2006 | 0 | 0 |
| 2007 | 0 | 0 |
| 2008 | 0 | 0 |
| 2009 | 6 | 0 |
| 2010 | 3 | 0 |
| Total | 40 | 0 |

== Honors ==
Levski Sofia

- Bulgarian League – 2001, 2002
- Bulgarian Cup – 2002, 2003, 2005

JEF United Chiba

- J.League Cup – 2005, 2006
- J. League Best Eleven – 2005

Sanfrecce Hiroshima

- Xerox Super Cup – 2008
- J2 League – 2008

== Personal life ==
- He is a friend of Bulgarian sumo wrestler Kotooshu Katsunori who became the first European to win the top division championship, Makuuchi.
