= Mihailo Petrović (footballer) =

Serbian footballer (born 1957)

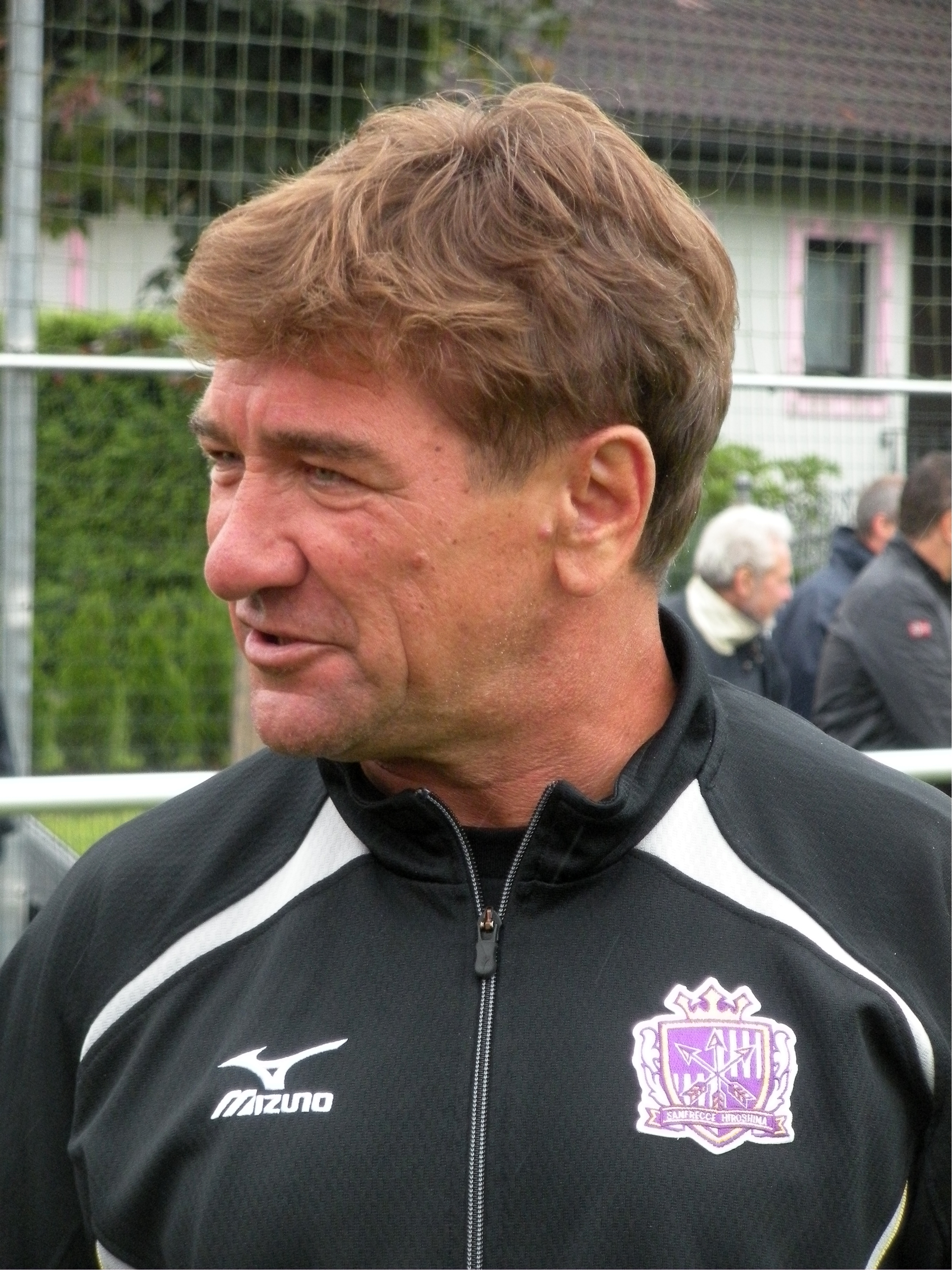
- Petrović as Sanfrecce Hiroshima manager in 2010

Personal information
- Date of birth: 18 October 1957 (age 69)
- Place of birth: Loznica, PR Serbia, Yugoslavia
- Height: 1.72 m (5 ft 8 in)
- Position: Midfielder

Team information
- Current team: Nagoya Grampus (manager)

Senior career*
Years	Team	Apps	(Gls)
1976–1977	Rad	47	(1)
1978	Red Star Belgrade	7	(0)
1979–1984	Olimpija Ljubljana	147	(7)
1984–1985	Dinamo Zagreb	34	(0)
1985–1993	Sturm Graz	233	(6)
Total		468	(14)

International career
1980	Yugoslavia	1	(0)

Managerial career
- 1993–1996: SV Pöllau
- 1996–1998: Sturm Graz (amateur)
- 1998–1999: Primorje
- 1999–2000: Domžale
- 2001: Primorje
- 2001–2002: Olimpija Ljubljana
- 2003: Dravograd
- 2003–2006: Sturm Graz
- 2006–2011: Sanfrecce Hiroshima
- 2012–2017: Urawa Red Diamonds
- 2018–2025: Hokkaido Consadole Sapporo
- 2026–: Nagoya Grampus
- * Club domestic league appearances and goals

Mihailo "Mischa" Petrović (Serbian Cyrillic: Михаило "Миша" Петровић, pronounced [pětroʋitɕ]; born 18 October 1957) is a Serbian football coach and former player who is the manager of Nagoya Grampus. He also holds an Austrian passport.

== Playing career ==
As a player, he was capped once by Yugoslavia, in a November 1980 World Cup qualification match against Italy.

== Managerial career ==
Petrović joined Japanese club Sanfrecce Hiroshima in June 2006. In his first full season in charge, Sanfrecce reached the final of the Emperor's Cup but were relegated to J2. The side recovered in style, storming to the title with a haul of 100 points. Their excellent form continued into the next season and Sanfrecce secured a 4th-placed finish on their return to J1, qualifying for the AFC Champions League for the first time in the club's history. It was announced on 9 November 2011 that Petrović would not be renewing his contract for the 2012 season.

On 14 December 2011, Petrović was appointed to guide the Japanese side Urawa Red Diamonds with a two-year contract. After 5 1/2 seasons in charge of the Saitama outfit, he was sacked on 31 July 2017.

On 10 January 2018, he was appointed manager of Hokkaido club Hokkaido Consadole Sapporo.

On 24 October 2020, Petrović became the first foreign manager to achieve 200 wins in J1.

On 4 March 2023, Petrović managed his 525th game in J1, breaking Akira Nishino's record for most games coached in J1 League history.

On 4 December 2024, it was announced Petrović would leave Hokkaido Consadole Sapporo, after 7 seasons, following the team's relegation from J1 League. His last match in charge of Sapporo was a 1–0 victory over Kashiwa Reysol.

On 18 December 2025, Petrović was announced as the new manager of Nagoya Grampus, starting from the 2026 season.

== Managerial statistics ==
As of 21 November 2026

Managerial record by team and tenure
Team	From	To	Record				
Team	From	To	G	W	D	L	Win %
Olimpija Ljubljana	1 July 2001	24 April 2002	34	15	7	12	44.12
Dravograd	4 April 2003	11 August 2003	14	4	3	7	28.57
Sturm Graz	8 September 2003	31 May 2006	115	35	34	46	30.43
Sanfrecce Hiroshima	10 June 2006	31 December 2011	245	117	50	78	47.76
Urawa Reds	1 January 2012	30 July 2017	262	140	52	70	53.44
Hokkaido Consadole Sapporo	1 January 2018	31 December 2024	315	113	83	119	35.87
Nagoya Grampus	1 January 2026	Present	39	13	10	16	33.33
Total			1,024	437	239	348	42.68

^{1} Results from penalty shoot-outs are counted as draws in this table.

== Honours ==
=== Manager ===
Sanfrecce Hiroshima

- Japanese Super Cup: 2008
- J.League Division 2: 2008

Urawa Red Diamonds

- J.League Cup: 2016

=== Individual ===
- J.League Manager of the Year: 2018
