= Kazuyuki Morisaki =

Japanese footballer

Kazuyuki Morisaki 森﨑 和幸
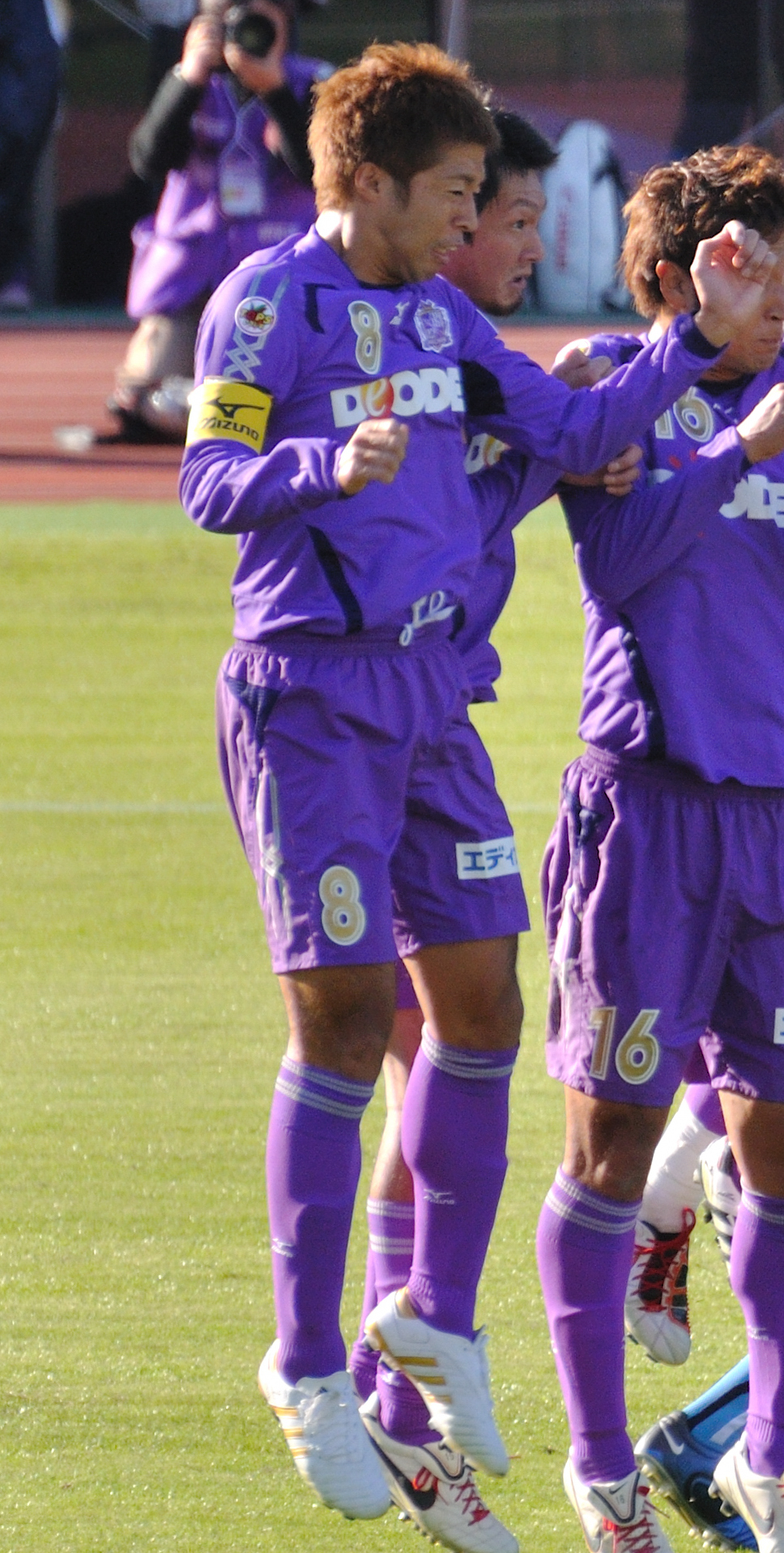
- Morisaki with Sanfrecce Hiroshima in 2010

Personal information
- Full name: Kazuyuki Morisaki
- Date of birth: 9 May 1981 (age 45)
- Place of birth: Hiroshima, Hiroshima, Japan
- Height: 1.77 m (5 ft 10 in)
- Position: Midfielder

Youth career
- 1997–1999: Sanfrecce Hiroshima

Senior career*
Years	Team	Apps	(Gls)
1999–2018	Sanfrecce Hiroshima	504	(22)
Total		504	(22)

International career
2001	Japan U-20	3	(1)
Medal record
Sanfrecce Hiroshima
Winner	J1 League	2012
Winner	J1 League	2013
Winner	J1 League	2015
Runner-up	J1 League	2018
Runner-up	J.League Cup	2010
Runner-up	J.League Cup	2014
Runner-up	Emperor's Cup	1999
Runner-up	Emperor's Cup	2007
Runner-up	Emperor's Cup	2013
Representing Japan
Asian Games
Silver medal – second place	2002 Busan	Team
AFC U-19 Championship
Silver medal – second place	2000 Iran
- * Club domestic league appearances and goals

Kazuyuki Morisaki (森﨑 和幸, Morisaki Kazuyuki; born 9 May 1981) is a Japanese former football player. His twin brother Koji Morisaki is also a footballer.

== Club career ==
Morisaki was born in Hiroshima on 9 May 1981. He joined J1 League club Sanfrecce Hiroshima from youth team in 1999. He debuted in November 1999 and played many matches as central midfielder for a long time from 2000. He was selected Rookie of the Year award in 2000. Although Sanfrecce played in J2 League in 2003 and 2008, played in J1 for a long time. In late in his career, Sanfrecce won the champions in 2012, 2013 and 2015 J1 League. However he could not play many matches from 2017 and retired end of 2018 season.

== National team career ==
In June 2001, Morisaki was selected Japan U-20 national team for 2001 World Youth Championship. At this tournament, he played full time in all 3 matches.

== Club statistics ==
Updated to 23 December 2018.

Club performance			League		Cup		League Cup		Continental		Other^{1}		Total	
Season	Club	League	Apps	Goals	Apps	Goals	Apps	Goals	Apps	Goals	Apps	Goals	Apps	Goals
Japan			League		Emperor's Cup		J.League Cup		AFC		Other		Total	
1999	Sanfrecce Hiroshima	J1 League	3	0	5	0	0	0	-		-		8	0
2000	Sanfrecce Hiroshima	J1 League	24	3	2	0	4	0	-		-		30	3
2001	Sanfrecce Hiroshima	J1 League	26	1	2	0	3	0	-		-		31	1
2002	Sanfrecce Hiroshima	J1 League	25	1	4	2	2	0	-		-		31	3
2003	Sanfrecce Hiroshima	J2 League	41	1	2	0	-		-		-		43	1
2004	Sanfrecce Hiroshima	J1 League	28	5	1	0	5	0	-		-		34	5
2005	Sanfrecce Hiroshima	J1 League	34	4	2	1	6	0	-		-		42	5
2006	Sanfrecce Hiroshima	J1 League	26	2	2	0	1	0	-		-		29	2
2007	Sanfrecce Hiroshima	J1 League	32	0	5	0	6	0	-		-		43	0
2008	Sanfrecce Hiroshima	J2 League	33	2	3	0	-		-		-		36	2
2009	Sanfrecce Hiroshima	J1 League	18	0	2	0	1	0	-		-		21	0
2010	Sanfrecce Hiroshima	J1 League	17	0	1	0	3	0	4	1	-		25	1
2011	Sanfrecce Hiroshima	J1 League	32	0	1	0	2	0	-		-		35	0
2012	Sanfrecce Hiroshima	J1 League	33	2	1	0	2	0	-		-		36	2
2013	Sanfrecce Hiroshima	J1 League	33	0	6	0	2	0	-		4	0	45	0
2014	Sanfrecce Hiroshima	J1 League	29	0	0	0	2	0	0	0	-		31	0
2015	Sanfrecce Hiroshima	J1 League	33	1	1	0	1	0	-		4	0	39	1
2016	Sanfrecce Hiroshima	J1 League	24	0	1	0	1	0	1	0	1	0	28	0
2017	Sanfrecce Hiroshima	J1 League	10	0	3	0	1	0	-		-		14	0
2018	Sanfrecce Hiroshima	J1 League	3	0	0	0	0	0	-		-		3	0
Career total			504	22	44	3	42	0	5	1	9	0	604	26

^{1}Includes Japanese Super Cup, FIFA Club World Cup and J.League Championship.

== Honors and awards ==
=== Club ===
Sanfrecce Hiroshima

- J1 League: 2012, 2013, 2015
- J2 League: 2008
- Japanese Super Cup: 2008, 2013, 2016

=== Individual ===
- J.League Rookie of the Year: 2000

== National team Career Stats ==
=== Appearances in Major Competitions ===
Year	Competition	Category	Appearances		Goals	Team Record
Year	Competition	Category	Start	Sub	Goals	Team Record
2001	2001 FIFA World Youth Championship	U-20	3	0	1	Round 1
