= Issei Takayanagi =

Japanese footballer

Issei Takayanagi 髙柳 一誠
Personal information
- Full name: Issei Takayanagi
- Date of birth: 14 September 1986 (age 40)
- Place of birth: Yokohama, Japan
- Height: 1.74 m (5 ft 8 1/2 in)
- Position: Midfielder

Team information
- Current team: Okinawa SV (assistant manager)

Youth career
- 1999–2004: Sanfrecce Hiroshima

Senior career*
Years	Team	Apps	(Gls)
2004–2011	Sanfrecce Hiroshima	110	(3)
2012	Consadole Sapporo	0	(0)
2013–2014	Vissel Kobe	8	(0)
2014–2016	Roasso Kumamoto	77	(1)
2017–2018	Renofa Yamaguchi FC	21	(0)
2019–2022	Okinawa SV	46	(0)
Total		216	(4)
Medal record
Sanfrecce Hiroshima
Runner-up	J.League Cup	2010
Runner-up	Emperor's Cup	2007
Representing Japan
AFC U-19 Championship
Bronze medal – third place	2004 Malaysia
- * Club domestic league appearances and goals as of 15 March 2023, 14:22 (UTC)

Issei Takayanagi (髙柳 一誠, Takayanagi Issei; born September 14, 1986) is a Japanese former football player and he currently assistant manager of JFL club, Okinawa SV.

== Playing career ==
Takayanagi joined Okinawa SV in February 2019 and retired in 2022.

== Club statistics ==
Updated to 23 February 2018.

Club performance			League		Cup		League Cup		Continental		Total	
Season	Club	League	Apps	Goals	Apps	Goals	Apps	Goals	Apps	Goals	Apps	Goals
Japan			League		Emperor's Cup		J.League Cup		AFC		Total	
2004	Sanfrecce Hiroshima	J1 League	3	0	0	0	1	1	-		4	1
2005	Sanfrecce Hiroshima	J1 League	6	0	0	0	1	0	-		7	0
2006	Sanfrecce Hiroshima	J1 League	13	0	1	0	5	0	-		19	0
2007	Sanfrecce Hiroshima	J1 League	21	0	5	1	8	0	-		34	1
2008	Sanfrecce Hiroshima	J2 League	24	0	4	2	-		-		28	2
2009	Sanfrecce Hiroshima	J1 League	26	3	2	1	5	1	-		33	5
2010	Sanfrecce Hiroshima	J1 League	17	0	2	0	3	0	5	1	27	1
2011	Sanfrecce Hiroshima	J1 League	0	0	0	0	0	0	-		0	0
2012	Consadole Sapporo	J1 League	0	0	0	0	0	0	-		0	0
2013	Vissel Kobe	J2 League	4	0	1	0	-		-		5	0
2014	Vissel Kobe	J1 League	4	0	0	0	1	0	-		5	0
2014	Roasso Kumamoto	J2 League	16	0	0	0	-		-		16	0
2015	Roasso Kumamoto	J2 League	35	0	1	0	-		-		36	0
2016	Roasso Kumamoto	J2 League	26	1	1	0	-		-		27	1
2017	Renofa Yamaguchi FC	J2 League	20	0	1	0	-		-		21	0
Career total			215	4	18	4	24	2	5	1	263	11
