= 2008 J.League Division 2 =

J.League Division 2
- Season: 2008
- Champions: Sanfrecce Hiroshima; 1st J2 title 1st D2 title
- Promoted: Sanfrecce Hiroshima; Montedio Yamagata
- Matches: 315
- Goals: 851 (2.7 per match)
- Top goalscorer: Hisato Satō (28 goals total)
- Highest attendance: 36,945 (Round 24, Yokohama vs. Thespa)
- Lowest attendance: 1,036 (Round 17, HollyHock vs. Vortis)
- Average attendance: 7,072

The 2008 J. League Division 2 season was the 37th season of the second-tier club football in Japan and the 10th season since the establishment of J2 League. The season started on March 8 and ended on December 6.

In this season, the number of participating clubs was increased by two, making the total number, fifteen. Unlike the first nine seasons, the clubs played in triple round-robin format, instead of quadruple round-robin format. At the end of the season, top two clubs were promoted and third-placed club advanced to the Pro/Rele Series. There were no relegation to third-tier Japan Football League.

== General ==
=== Promotion and relegation ===
- At the end of the 2007 season, Consadole Sapporo, Tokyo Verdy 1969 and Kyoto Sanga were promoted to J1
- At the end of the 2007 season, Sanfrecce Hiroshima, Ventforet Kofu and Yokohama FC were relegated to J2
- At the end of the 2007 season, Rosso Kumamoto and FC Gifu were promoted from the JFL.

=== Changes in competition format ===
- The Division 2 was expanded to 15 clubs.
- The new J2 format will consist of triple round-robin instead of quadruple round-robin to reduce the games played by team to 42 games.

=== Changes in clubs ===
- Rosso Kumamoto was renamed Roasso Kumamoto before joining the League.

== Clubs ==
Locations of the 2008 J.League 2 teams

Following fifteen clubs played in J. League Division 2 during 2008 season. Of these clubs, Sanfrecce Hiroshima, Ventforet Kofu, and Yokohama F.C. relegated from Division 1 last year. Also, Roasso Kumamoto and F.C. Gifu newly joined from Japan Football League.

- Vegalta Sendai
- Montedio Yamagata
- Mito HollyHock
- Thespa Kusatsu
- Yokohama F.C.
- Shonan Bellmare
- Ventforet Kofu
- F.C. Gifu
- Cerezo Osaka
- Sanfrecce Hiroshima
- Tokushima Vortis
- Ehime F.C.
- Avispa Fukuoka
- Sagan Tosu
- Roasso Kumamoto

== League format ==
Fifteen clubs will play in triple round-robin format, a total of 42 games each. A club receives 3 points for a win, 1 point for a tie, and 0 points for a loss. The clubs are ranked by points, and tie breakers are, in the following order:

- Goal differential
- Goals scored
- Head-to-head results
- Disciplinary points

A draw would be conducted, if necessary. However, if two clubs are tied at the first place, both clubs will be declared as the champions. The top two clubs will be promoted to J1, while the 3rd placed club plays a two-legged Promotion/relegation series.

Changes from Previous Year

- Thirteen participating clubs (2006–2007) to fifteen clubs (2008)
- Quadruple round-robin format (1999–2007) to triple round-robin format (2008–2009)
- Introduction of Disciplinary points for tie breaker (2008–)

== Final league table ==
Pos	Team	Pld	W	D	L	GF	GA	GD	Pts	Promotion
1	Sanfrecce Hiroshima (C, P)	42	31	7	4	99	35	+64	100	Promotion to 2009 J. League Division 1
2	Montedio Yamagata (P)	42	23	9	10	66	40	+26	78	Promotion to 2009 J. League Division 1
3	Vegalta Sendai	42	18	16	8	62	47	+15	70	2008 promotion/relegation Series
4	Cerezo Osaka	42	21	6	15	81	60	+21	69	
5	Shonan Bellmare	42	19	8	15	68	48	+20	65	
6	Sagan Tosu	42	19	7	16	50	51	−1	64	
7	Ventforet Kofu	42	15	14	13	56	47	+9	59	
8	Avispa Fukuoka	42	15	13	14	55	66	−11	58	
9	Thespa Kusatsu	42	13	14	15	45	52	−7	53	
10	Yokohama FC	42	11	17	14	51	56	−5	50	
11	Mito HollyHock	42	13	8	21	52	70	−18	47	
12	Roasso Kumamoto	42	10	13	19	46	72	−26	43	
13	FC Gifu	42	10	12	20	41	69	−28	42	
14	Ehime FC	42	9	10	23	39	66	−27	37	
15	Tokushima Vortis	42	7	8	27	40	72	−32	29	

Updated to match(es) played on December 6, 2008. Source: J. League Division 2
Rules for classification: 1) points; 2) goal difference; 3) number of goals scored.
(C) Champions; (P) Promoted

== Final results ==
Rounds 1 & 2
Home \ Away	SFR	MON	VEG	CER	BEL	SAG	VEN	AVI	SPA	YFC	HOL	ROS	GIF	EHI	VOR
Sanfrecce Hiroshima		1–0	0–1	4–1	5–2	1–0	1–2	1–1	1–0	1–0	2–2	2–2	4–0	3–0	2–1
Montedio Yamagata	2–1		3–0	0–2	1–0	3–0	0–0	0–0	1–0	1–0	3–1	3–1	3–5	3–0	2–0
Vegalta Sendai	1–1	3–2		0–0	2–2	3–0	2–0	1–0	1–0	2–0	3–3	0–0	1–1	0–1	1–1
Cerezo Osaka	1–2	1–3	2–1		2–0	0–1	3–3	2–1	1–2	1–2	1–2	1–0	1–0	2–0	1–0
Shonan Bellmare	0–2	1–1	1–0	3–0		2–1	1–0	4–0	2–3	4–1	0–1	4–1	4–2	4–1	2–3
Sagan Tosu	0–1	1–0	1–2	1–0	1–0		2–1	1–3	1–1	1–0	3–0	1–1	0–0	2–1	2–1
Ventforet Kofu	0–2	1–0	2–2	3–2	0–4	1–2		2–2	1–2	2–1	2–0	3–1	1–1	1–0	0–0
Avispa Fukuoka	0–3	0–3	2–0	0–1	2–2	2–0	0–2		1–1	3–2	2–1	2–4	1–5	2–0	2–1
Thespa Kusatsu	0–2	1–1	0–0	1–3	1–2	1–0	0–0	1–2		0–0	2–1	2–0	1–1	2–1	2–0
Yokohama FC	1–2	2–5	1–1	1–1	3–2	0–0	0–0	2–1	0–0		1–0	5–0	0–1	1–0	1–1
Mito HollyHock	1–2	2–1	3–4	0–2	0–2	2–1	1–0	2–3	2–2	2–2		2–2	1–3	1–0	1–0
Roasso Kumamoto	1–2	1–2	2–2	3–2	0–2	0–1	2–1	1–2	2–1	1–1	1–3		0–2	1–0	3–0
FC Gifu	1–1	2–1	0–1	0–5	0–0	0–1	1–1	0–1	0–1	2–3	0–1	0–0		0–3	2–1
Ehime FC	0–2	0–0	1–1	1–4	1–1	1–2	2–1	1–1	1–2	2–2	2–0	2–1	0–0		1–0
Tokushima Vortis	1–4	1–2	1–3	2–0	1–1	0–4	1–3	3–1	2–3	0–2	2–0	2–0	0–1	0–3	

Updated to match(es) played on August 10, 2008. Source: J. League Division 2
Legend: Blue = home team win; Yellow = draw; Red = away team win.

Round 3
Home \ Away	SFR	MON	VEG	CER	BEL	SAG	VEN	AVI	SPA	YFC	HOL	ROS	GIF	EHI	VOR
Sanfrecce Hiroshima					2–0	5–1		4–0	4–3				7–1	4–1	3–0
Montedio Yamagata	0–4				1–0	0–1	1–1	1–0			1–0	1–1			
Vegalta Sendai	1–1	0–1						3–0	1–0		2–3		1–0	1–0	
Cerezo Osaka	2–3	2–2	3–4		2–1						2–1			2–1	3–2
Shonan Bellmare			1–2				1–0		4–0	1–0	1–0	0–1	3–0		
Sagan Tosu			4–1	1–4	0–1		1–1		3–2	3–2		1–2			
Ventforet Kofu	2–0		1–1	2–3				0–1	2–2			5–1	4–0		
Avispa Fukuoka				3–2	3–1	2–2				0–0		2–2		2–2	3–1
Thespa Kusatsu		0–0		0–4				1–1			0–1	0–0	3–1		1–0
Yokohama FC	1–1	1–4	2–2	2–2			0–0		1–1					2–2	
Mito HollyHock	1–4					1–1	1–2	0–0		2–3			1–4		2–0
Roasso Kumamoto	1–2		0–4	2–2						1–0	0–2		1–1		2–2
FC Gifu		1–2		0–6		1–0		1–1		0–1				0–1	1–1
Ehime FC		2–3			2–2	0–2	0–1		1–0		2–2	0–1			
Tokushima Vortis		0–3	1–1		0–0	2–0	0–2			1–2				5–0	

Updated to match(es) played on December 6, 2008. Source: J. League Division 2
Legend: Blue = home team win; Yellow = draw; Red = away team win.

== Top scorers ==
Rank	Scorer	Club	Goals
1	(Japan) Hisato Satō	Sanfrecce Hiroshima	28
2	(Japan) Yutaka Takahashi	Roasso Kumamoto	19
3	(Japan) Naoki Ishihara	Shonan Bellmare	18
3	(Japan) Yoshihito Fujita	Sagan Tosu	18
5	(Japan) Tomoyuki Arata	Mito HollyHock	17
6	(Brazil) Anderson	Yokohama FC	16
6	(Japan) Rui Komatsu	Cerezo Osaka	16
6	(Japan) Shinji Kagawa	Cerezo Osaka	16
9	(Japan) Kōji Morisaki	Sanfrecce Hiroshima	14
9	(Japan) Yojiro Takahagi	Sanfrecce Hiroshima	14
9	(Japan) Tetsuya Ōkubo	Avispa Fukuoka	14

== Attendance ==
Pos	Team	Total	High	Low	Average	Change
1	Vegalta Sendai	295,679	23,745	10,317	14,080	−4.1%
2	Sanfrecce Hiroshima	227,631	19,349	4,622	10,840	−5.1%^{†}
3	Cerezo Osaka	221,629	21,200	5,554	10,554	+59.3%
4	Ventforet Kofu	217,428	14,521	7,267	10,354	−24.6%^{†}
5	Avispa Fukuoka	211,651	15,158	5,729	10,079	+5.8%
6	Sagan Tosu	152,486	21,029	3,869	7,261	+18.8%
7	Yokohama FC	142,655	36,945	2,536	6,793	−51.6%^{†}
8	Montedio Yamagata	131,725	15,422	2,479	6,273	+47.8%
9	Shonan Bellmare	125,865	11,660	3,543	5,994	+28.2%
10	Roasso Kumamoto	110,860	20,635	2,026	5,279	+47.9%^{‡}
11	Thespa Kusatsu	88,510	8,096	1,819	4,215	+10.7%
12	Tokushima Vortis	81,093	11,897	2,146	3,862	+17.4%
13	FC Gifu	78,650	8,374	2,028	3,745	+6.1%^{‡}
14	Ehime FC	77,775	7,809	2,088	3,704	+11.7%
15	Mito HollyHock	63,933	5,573	1,036	3,044	+26.0%
	League total	2,227,570	36,945	1,036	7,072	+8.4%

Updated to games played on December 6, 2008
Source: J. League Division 2
Notes:
^{†} Team played previous season in J1.
^{‡} Team played previous season in JFL.
