= 2013 Emperor's Cup =

Tournament details
- Country: Japan
- Teams: 88

Final positions
- Champions: Yokohama F. Marinos (7th title)
- Runners-up: Sanfrecce Hiroshima

Tournament statistics
- Matches played: 87
- Goals scored: 281 (3.23 per match)
- Top goal scorer(s): Takuma Sonoda (Fukuoka U.); Kenyu Sugimoto (Cerezo); Yoshihito Fujita (F. Marinos) (4 goals each)

The 93rd Emperor's Cup (第93回天皇杯全日本サッカー選手権大会) was the regular edition of the annual Japanese national cup tournament. It started on August 31, 2013 and ended on 1 January 2014 with the final at National Stadium in Tokyo.

Yokohama F. Marinos defeated 2013 J.League Division 1 champions Sanfrecce Hiroshima 2–0 for their seventh Emperor's Cup, their first in twenty-one years and their second in the J.League era after winning 1992 Emperor's Cup as Nissan F.C. Yokohama Marinos. The cup winners would normally receive a berth in the upcoming AFC Champions League; as F. Marinos finished as J.League runners-up that year, the nod went to Cerezo Osaka, the fourth-placed team in the 2013 J.League Division 1.

== Calendar ==
Round	Date	Matches	Clubs	New entries this round
First Round	August 31, September 1	24	47+1 → 24	47 prefectural cup winners; 1 JFL seeded club
Second Round	September 4, 7, 8, 11	32	24+18+22 → 32	18 J1 clubs; 22 J2 clubs
Third Round	October 13, 14, 16	16	32 → 16	
Fourth Round	November 16, 20	8	16 → 8	
Quarterfinals	December 22	4	8 → 4	
Semifinals	December 29	2	4 → 2	
Final	January 1, 2014	1	2 → 1	

== Participating clubs ==
88 clubs competed in the tournament. The 18 J.League Division 1 clubs and 22 J.League Division 2 clubs receive a bye to the second round of the tournament. The other 47 teams earned berths by winning their respective prefectural cup tournaments, and entered from the first round along with the JFL seeded team, the team with the best record after the 17th matchday.

2013 J.League Division 1 all clubs	2013 J.League Division 2 all clubs	2013 Japan Football League best club after matchday 17	47 prefectural tournament winners	
Albirex Niigata; Kashima Antlers; Omiya Ardija; Shonan Bellmare; Cerezo Osaka; Yokohama F. Marinos; Kawasaki Frontale; Nagoya Grampus; Júbilo Iwata; Oita Trinita; Urawa Red Diamonds; Kashiwa Reysol; Shimizu S-Pulse; Sagan Tosu; Sanfrecce Hiroshima; FC Tokyo; Vegalta Sendai; Ventforet Kofu	Avispa Fukuoka; Consadole Sapporo; Ehime FC; Fagiano Okayama; Gainare Tottori; Gamba Osaka; FC Gifu; Giravanz Kitakyushu; Mito HollyHock; JEF United Ichihara Chiba; Kataller Toyama; Montedio Yamagata; Roasso Kumamoto; Kyoto Sanga FC; Thespakusatsu Gunma; Tochigi SC; Tokyo Verdy; Vissel Kobe; Tokushima Vortis; V-Varen Nagasaki; Matsumoto Yamaga FC; Yokohama FC	Kamatamare Sanuki	Hokkaido: Hokkaido UE Iwamizawa; Aomori: Vanraure Hachinohe; Iwate: Grulla Morioka; Miyagi: Sony Sendai FC; Akita: Blaublitz Akita; Yamagata: Haguro High School; Fukushima: Fukushima United FC; Ibaraki: University of Tsukuba; Tochigi: Tochigi Uva FC; Gunma: Thespa Kusatsu Challengers; Saitama: Tokyo International University; Chiba: Urayasu SC; Tokyo: Yokogawa Musashino FC; Kanagawa: Toin University of Yokohama; Yamanashi: Yamanashi Gakuin University Pegasus; Nagano: AC Nagano Parceiro; Niigata: Niigata University of Management; Toyama: Toyama Shinjo Club; Ishikawa: Zweigen Kanazawa; Fukui: Saurcos Fukui; Shizuoka: Fujieda MYFC; Aichi: Toyota Shūkyūdan; Mie: Mind House Yokkaichi; Gifu: FC Gifu Second	Shiga: MIO Biwako Shiga; Kyoto: Sagawa Printing SC; Osaka: Kansai University; Hyōgo: Kwansei Gakuin University; Nara: Nara Club; Wakayama: Arterivo Wakayama; Tottori: Yonago Kita High School; Shimane: Dezzolla Shimane; Okayama: Fagiano Okayama Next; Hiroshima: Sagawa Express Chūgoku SC; Yamaguchi: Renofa Yamaguchi FC; Kagawa: Takamatsu Shogyo High School; Tokushima: Naruto High School; Ehime: FC Imabari; Kōchi: Kōchi University; Fukuoka: Fukuoka University; Saga: Saga University; Nagasaki: Mitsubishi Nagasaki SC; Kumamoto: Kumamoto Gakuen University; Ōita: Hoyo Oita; Miyazaki: Miyazaki Sangyo-keiei University; Kagoshima: NIFS Kanoya; Okinawa: FC Ryukyu

== First round ==
The 47 prefectural tournament winners join JFL seeded team Kamatamare Sanuki in the first round.

1 September 2013 #1	Sagawa Express Chūgoku SC	1–4	Fukuoka University	Fukuyama
15:00	Kawakami 5'	Report	Sonoda 12', 31', 53', 76'	Stadium: Fukuyama Takegahana Stadium; Attendance: 761; Referee: Shuhei Shimizu

31 August 2013 #2	FC Ryukyu	2–1 (a.e.t.)	Dezzolla Shimane	Okinawa
15:00	Nakayama 80', 95'	Report		Stadium: Okinawa Athletic Stadium; Attendance: 682; Referee: Takumi Shinoto

31 August 2013 #3	Yamanashi Gakuin University Pegasus	1–2	Fukushima United FC	Kōfu
13:00	Mukai 5'	Report	Kim Hong-yeon 47'; Shirai 90+1'	Stadium: Yamanashi Chuo Bank Stadium; Attendance: 395; Referee: Hayato Shimizu

1 September 2013 #4	National Institute of Fitness and Sports in Kanoya	0–1	Kōchi University	Kagoshima
13:00		Report	Watanabe 57'	Stadium: Kagoshima Kamoike Stadium; Attendance: 336; Referee: Masaki Tsuruoka

1 September 2013 #5	Arterivo Wakayama	2–3 (a.e.t.)	Fujieda MYFC	Kinokawa
13:00	Takada 26'; Sunami 37'	Report	Fujimaki 80', 83'; Murase 97'	Stadium: Kinokawa Athletic Stadium; Attendance: 491; Referee: Takao Nishiyama

1 September 2013 #6	Zweigen Kanazawa	6–1	Toyama Shinjo Club	Kanazawa
13:00	Kiyohara 10', 65', 68'; Otsuki 30'; Sugawara 45+1'; Saito 90+1'	Report	Maeda 34'	Stadium: Ishikawa Kanazawa Stadium; Attendance: 551; Referee: Isao Nishihashi

1 September 2013 #7	Vanraure Hachinohe	1–0	Toin University of Yokohama	Towada
13:00	Hiroki 43'	Report		Stadium: Takamoriyama Sports Park; Attendance: 840; Referee: Shin Hibino

1 September 2013 #8	Yonago Kita High School	0–2	Fagiano Okayama Next	Tottori
13:00		Report	Ida 49'; Takeuchi 79'	Stadium: Tottori Bank Bird Stadium; Attendance: 559; Referee: Yusuke Araki

1 September 2013 #9	Kumamoto Gakuen University	1–9	FC Imabari	Higashi-ku
13:00	Furuya 40'	Report	Takada 12'; Matsudaira 17'; Ogasawara 21', 84'; Okamoto 44'; KGU 59' (o.g.); Saito 71'; Nakajima 74', 90+2'	Stadium: Kumamoto Athletics Stadium; Attendance: 508; Referee: Kazuaki Mitsuke

31 August 2013 #10	Naruto High School	0–2	Saga University	Naruto
13:00		Report	Oda 51'; Matsuyama 90'	Stadium: Pocarisweat Stadium; Attendance: 360; Referee: Tsuyoshi Kumagaya

31 August 2013 #11	Saurcos Fukui	1–0	Miyazaki Sangyo-keiei University	Sakai
15:00	Shogo 85'	Report		Stadium: Technoport Fukui Stadium; Attendance: 1,012; Referee: Atsushi Masaki

31 August 2013 #12	Hokkaido UE Iwamizawa	2–1	Haguro High School	Sapporo
13:00	Kasai 33'; Shida 84'	Report	Kimura 31'	Stadium: Sapporo Atsubetsu Park Stadium; Attendance: 211; Referee: Toru Kakinuma

1 September 2013 #13	Blaublitz Akita	2–0	Renofa Yamaguchi FC	Akita
13:00	Maeyama 23'; Handa 31'	Report		Stadium: Akita Yabase Stadium; Attendance: 1,053; Referee: Atsushi Uemura

31 August 2013 #14	Mind House Yokkaichi	0–1	Niigata University of Management	Suzuka
13:00		Report	Tanaka 22'	Stadium: Suzuka Sports Garden; Attendance: 338; Referee: Hirokazu Otsubo

1 September 2013 #15	Mitsubishi Nagasaki SC	1–2	Hoyo Oita	Isahaya
16:00	Konoya 23'	Report	Nakajima 11'; Fukumitsu 13'	Stadium: Nagasaki Athletic Stadium; Attendance: 400; Referee: Hito Hayashi

31 August 2013 #16	Nagano Parceiro	4–1	Toyota Shūkyūdan	Saku
15:00	Oshima 28'; Aoki 28'; Arinaga 84'; Nishiguchi 87'	Report	Hasuo 72'	Stadium: Saku Athletic Stadium; Attendance: 1,384; Referee: Ryoichi Imamura

31 August 2013 #17	Kamatamare Sanuki	7–2	Takamatsu Shogyo High School	Takamatsu
14:00	Ishida 39', 62', 82'; Kanzaki 48', 74'; Ota 52'; Fujita 59'	Report	Okada 24'; Nakamura 37'	Stadium: Kagawa General Sports Park; Attendance: 735; Referee: Shingo Yamamoto

1 September 2013 #18	Thespa Kusatsu Challengers	0–3 (a.e.t.)	Yokogawa Musashino FC	Maebashi
13:00		Report	Yabe 93'; Sekino 103'; Ono 116'	Stadium: Gunma Shikishima Soccer Stadium; Attendance: 710; Referee: Tomohiro Tsukada

31 August 2013 #19	Tochigi Uva FC	2–1	Tokyo International University	Utsunomiya
13:00	Ichikawa 6'; Adachi 52'	Report	Meiji 54'	Stadium: Tochigi Green Stadium; Attendance: 551; Referee: Seiwa Sato

1 September 2013 #20	FC Gifu Second	1–2	Kansai University	Gifu
13:00	Midori 69'	Report	Okuda 7'; Tsunami 57'	Stadium: Nagaragawa Ball Field Meadow; Attendance: 603; Referee: Kudai Manabe

1 September 2013 #21	Nara Club	3–2 (a.e.t.)	Kwansei Gakuin University	Kashihara
13:00	Ikeda 19', 47'; Hashigaito 114'	Report	Kobayashi 49'; Guya 90+1'	Stadium: Kashihara Public Garden Nara Prefectural Stadium; Attendance: 670; Referee: Yunosuke Kinji

31 August 2013 #22	University of Tsukuba	4–1 (a.e.t.)	Urayasu SC	Naka
15:00	Akasaki 22', 120+3'; Hayakawa 111'; Taniguchi 117'	Report	Shimizu 36'	Stadium: Kasamatsu Stadium; Attendance: 847; Referee: Kazuya Fujita

1 September 2013 #23	Grulla Morioka	0–1	Sony Sendai FC	Morioka
13:00		Report	Sawaguchi 72'	Stadium: South Park Football Stadium; Attendance: 645; Referee: Minoru Fujita

31 August 2013 #24	Sagawa Printing S.C.	2–0	MIO Biwako Shiga	Ukyō-ku
15:00	Sato 3'; Fujimoto 13'	Report		Stadium: Nishikyogoku Athletic Stadium; Attendance: 274; Referee: Norihisa Miyabe

== Second round ==
The 24 winners from the first round are joined by all 40 J.League teams. Ties that were played on September 11 had been moved from their originally-scheduled dates of September 7 and 8; the Kashiwa Reysol–University of Tsukuba match originally scheduled for the 7th was moved to the 10th, then the 4th due to a league scheduling conflict.

8 September 2013 #25	Sanfrecce Hiroshima	1–0	Fukuoka University	Fukuyama
15:00	Chiba 12'	Report		Stadium: Fukuyama Takegahana Stadium; Attendance: 5,016; Referee: Keigi Takayama

8 September 2013 #26	Roasso Kumamoto	1–1 (a.e.t.) (4–3 p)	Tokushima Vortis	Higashi-ku
16:00	Yabu 77'	Report	Douglas 31'	Stadium: Kumamoto Athletics Stadium; Attendance: 2,530; Referee: Yuki Noda
	Penalties
	Hashimoto (penalty scored); Harada (penalty scored); Yabu (penalty scored); Kuroki (penalty scored)		(penalty scored) Shibasaki; (penalty missed) Aoyama; (penalty scored) Hamada; (penalty scored) Osaki; (penalty missed) Alex

8 September 2013 #27	Shonan Bellmare	4–0	FC Ryukyu	Hiratsuka
13:00	Taketomi 3', 24', 73'; Usami 9'	Report		Stadium: Shonan BMW Stadium Hiratsuka; Attendance: 1,808; Referee: Hajime Matsuo

7 September 2013 #28	Ventforet Kofu	1–0	Fukushima United FC	Kōfu
13:00	Pottker 90+1'	Report		Stadium: Yamanashi Chuo Bank Stadium; Attendance: 2,267; Referee: Minoru Tojo

11 September 2013 #29	Kawasaki Frontale	3–1	Kōchi University	Kawasaki
19:00	Alan Pinheiro 10' (pen.), 67'; Natsume 64'	Report	Deguchi 51'	Stadium: Todoroki Athletics Stadium; Attendance: 2,747; Referee: Takuto Okabe

8 September 2013 #30	Tokyo Verdy	3–2	V-Varen Nagasaki	Kita
17:00	Maki 12', 87'; Seki 54'	Report	Furube 36'; Inoue 44'	Stadium: Nishigaoka Soccer Stadium; Attendance: 1,823; Referee: Shoichiro Mikami

7 September 2013 #31	Shimizu S-Pulse	2–0	Fujieda MYFC	Shimizu-ku
15:00	Omae 72'; Radončić 74'	Report		Stadium: IAI Stadium Nihondaira; Attendance: 5,215; Referee: Takuya Maeda

8 September 2013 #32	Yokohama FC	0–1	Zweigen Kanazawa	Kanazawa
13:00		Report	Sugawara 30'	Stadium: Ishikawa Kanazawa Stadium; Attendance: 3,320; Referee: Atsushi Uemura

11 September 2013 #33	Yokohama F. Marinos	5–1	Vanraure Hachinohe	Kanagawa-ku
19:00	Hyodo 21'; Fujita 51', 64', 90' (pen.); Saitō 69'	Report	Kobayashi 19'	Stadium: Nippatsu Mitsuzawa Stadium; Attendance: 3,127; Referee: Keigi Takayama

7 September 2013 #34	Tochigi SC	5–1	Avispa Fukuoka	Utsunomiya
13:00	Kikuoka 10', 90+5'; Yuzawa 55'; Kondo 74'; Sabia 90+3'	Report	Punoševac 1'	Stadium: Tochigi Green Stadium; Attendance: 1,249; Referee: Akihiko Ikeuchi

7 September 2013 #35	Omiya Ardija	4–0	Fagiano Okayama Next	Ōmiya-ku
13:00	Cho Young-Cheol 16', 37', 73' (pen.); Imai 51'	Report		Stadium: NACK5 Stadium Omiya; Attendance: 2,051; Referee: Tomohiro Inoue

8 September 2013 #36	Gamba Osaka	5–0	FC Imabari	Suita
15:00	Hirai 43'; Adi Rocha 66', 67'; Niwa 86'; Usami 89'	Report		Stadium: Osaka Expo '70 Stadium; Attendance: 2,489; Referee: Koji Morikawa

7 September 2013 #37	Matsumoto Yamaga FC	4–3 (a.e.t.)	Thespakusatsu Gunma	Matsumoto
16:00	Rodrigo Cabeça 17' (pen.), 51'; Kurata 99'; Shiozawa 118'	Report	Sakai 3'; Daniel Lovinho 84'; Nozaki 92'	Stadium: Matsumotodaira Football Stadium; Attendance: 5,045; Referee: Tetsuro Yoshida

8 September 2013 #38	Sagan Tosu	10–0	Saga University	Tosu
13:00	Noda 2', 37'; Okada 12', 26'; Kanai 24'; Yeo Sung-Hye 28'; Ikeda 50'; Kiyotake 64', 67'; Bando 81'	Report		Stadium: Tosu Stadium; Attendance: 2,827; Referee: Kenji Ogiya

7 September 2013 #39	Júbilo Iwata	8–1	Saurcos Fukui	Iwata
13:00	Yamamoto 12', 61', 70'; Yamada 22', 25'; Yamazaki 27'; Abe 83'; Maeda 89'	Report	Abe 35'	Stadium: Yamaha Stadium; Attendance: 2,593; Referee: Kaku Hirose

7 September 2013 #40	Consadole Sapporo	4–1	Hokkaido UE Iwamizawa	Sapporo
13:00	Lê Công Vinh 14' (pen.), 54'; Yokono 69'; Sunakawa 72'	Report	Ito 10'	Stadium: Sapporo Atsubetsu Park Stadium; Attendance: 2,749; Referee: Yukie Koya

7 September 2013 #41	Vegalta Sendai	3–0	Blaublitz Akita	Sendai
15:00	Sasaki 1'; Akamine 63'; Matsushita 82'	Report		Stadium: Yurtec Stadium Sendai; Attendance: 3,377; Referee: Yoshiro Imamura

7 September 2013 #42	Mito HollyHock	1–1 (a.e.t.) (4–2 p)	Ehime FC	Mito
13:00	Mishima 23'	Report	Osmar 48'	Stadium: K's denki Stadium Mito; Attendance: 1,412; Referee: Eiji Kawai
	Penalties
	Hashimoto (penalty scored); Mishima (penalty scored); Yamamura (penalty scored); Ishigami (penalty scored)		(penalty scored) Alair; (penalty missed) Kato; (penalty scored) Matsumoto; (penalty missed) Osmar

7 September 2013 #43	Albirex Niigata	4–2 (a.e.t.)	Niigata University of Management	Niigata
13:00	Léo Silva 22'; Tanaka 95'; Homma 96'; Kim 109'	Report	Ota 81'; Nakamura 92'	Stadium: Niigata Stadium; Attendance: 4,345; Referee: Koichiro Fukushima

8 September 2013 #44	Oita Trinita	2–0	Hoyo Oita	Ōita
13:00	Morishima 28', 38'	Report		Stadium: Ōita Bank Dome; Attendance: 3,525; Referee: Yosuke Kubota

8 September 2013 #45	Nagoya Grampus	0–2	Nagano Parceiro	Nagoya
15:00		Report	Sato 13'; Arinaga 41'	Stadium: Nagoya City Minato Soccer Stadium; Attendance: 3,134; Referee: Takehiro Yamamoto

8 September 2013 #46	Gainare Tottori	0–2	Giravanz Kitakyushu	Tottori
13:00		Report	Watari 65'; Morimura 87'	Stadium: Tottori Bank Bird Stadium; Attendance: 1,480; Referee: Masuya Ueda

8 September 2013 #47	JEF United Ichihara Chiba	5–0	Kamatamare Sanuki	Chiba
16:00	Kempes 17'; Yonekura 23'; Satō 57', 88'; Takahashi 64'	Report		Stadium: Fukuda Denshi Arena; Attendance: 3,606; Referee: Kenta Tsukada

7 September 2013 #48	FC Tokyo	1–0 (a.e.t.)	Yokogawa Musashino FC	Chōfu
16:00	Hirayama 105+3'	Report		Stadium: Ajinomoto Stadium; Attendance: 7,469; Referee: Takuto Okabe

11 September 2013 #49	Urawa Red Diamonds	2–1	Tochigi Uva FC	Urawa-ku
19:00	Hayashi 23'; Márcio Richardes 42'	Report	Ichikawa 64'	Stadium: Urawa Komaba Stadium; Attendance: 5,768; Referee: Koichiro Fukushima

7 September 2013 #50	Montedio Yamagata	2–2 (a.e.t.) (9–8 p)	Kataller Toyama	Tendō
14:00	Hayashi 63'; Kataller 109' (o.g.)	Report	Shirasaki 35', 107'	Stadium: ND Soft Stadium Yamagata; Attendance: 2,037; Referee: Taku Hase
	Penalties
	Hayashi (penalty missed); Kim Byeom-Yong (penalty scored); Nakashima (penalty missed); Okubo (penalty scored); Nakamura (penalty scored); Frank (penalty scored); Peña (penalty scored); Nishikawa (penalty scored); Lee Joo-Young (penalty scored); Yamada (penalty missed); Tokizawa (penalty scored); Hayashi (penalty scored)		(penalty scored) Shirasaki; (penalty scored) Seo Yong-Duk; (penalty scored) Kuniyoshi; (penalty missed) Kim Young-Geun; (penalty missed) Tachino; (penalty scored) Yang Hae-Joon; (penalty scored) Asuke; (penalty scored) Nishikawa; (penalty scored) Ikehata; (penalty missed) Onishi; (penalty scored) Morita; (penalty missed) Shirasaki

8 September 2013 #51	Cerezo Osaka	4–0	Kansai University	Higashisumiyoshi-ku
15:00	Sugimoto 7', 48', 90' (pen.); Yamashita 79'	Report		Stadium: Kincho Stadium; Attendance: 4,127; Referee: Ikkei Enomoto

8 September 2013 #52	Vissel Kobe	3–1	Nara Club	Miki
13:00	Yoshida 30', 47'; Kitamoto 34'	Report	Okayama 90'	Stadium: Miki Athletic Stadium; Attendance: 2,766; Referee: Hiromichi Oka

4 September 2013 #53	Kashiwa Reysol	4–2	University of Tsukuba	Kashiwa
19:00	Cléo 13', 22'; Hashimoto 39'; Ota 70'	Report	Nakano 17'; Akazaki 84'	Stadium: Hitachi Kashiwa Soccer Stadium; Attendance: 2,635; Referee: Masaaki Lehon

8 September 2013 #54	Fagiano Okayama	2–1	FC Gifu	Okayama
14:00	Shimada 20'; Kondo 34'	Report	Someya 54'	Stadium: Kanko Stadium; Attendance: 2,833; Referee: Takumi Shinoto

7 September 2013 #55	Kashima Antlers	3–0	Sony Sendai FC	Kashima
17:00	Yamamura 81'; Nozawa 89'; Endo 90+4'	Report		Stadium: Kashima Soccer Stadium; Attendance: 3,194; Referee: Shinji Murakami

8 September 2013 #56	Kyoto Sanga FC	4–0	Sagawa Printing SC	Ukyō-ku
16:00	Kudo 58', 67'; Mitsuhira 83', 87'	Report		Stadium: Nishikyogoku Athletic Stadium; Attendance: 1,773; Referee: Haruki Hidaka

== Third round ==
Nagano Parceiro and Zweigen Kanazawa, both playing in the Japan Football League, were the lowest-ranked teams remaining at this stage in the competition.

14 October 2013 #57	Sanfrecce Hiroshima (1)	2–0	Roasso Kumamoto (2)	Hiroshima
15:00	Ishihara 1'; Satō 63'	Report		Stadium: Hiroshima Big Arch; Attendance: 5,876; Referee: Koichiro Fukushima

13 October 2013 #58	Shonan Bellmare (1)	0–1 (a.e.t.)	Ventforet Kofu (1)	Hiratsuka
13:00		Report	Miyuki 104'	Stadium: Shonan BMW Stadium Hiratsuka; Attendance: 3,209; Referee: Ikkei Enomoto

16 October 2013 #59	Kawasaki Frontale (1)	3–0	Tokyo Verdy (2)	Kawasaki
19:00	Yajima 4'; Ōkubo 9'; Renato 77'	Report		Stadium: Todoroki Athletics Stadium; Attendance: 5,049; Referee: Junpei Ida

14 October 2013 #60	Shimizu S-Pulse (1)	3–2	Zweigen Kanazawa (3)	Shimizu-ku
15:00	Omae 45+2'; Takagi 90', 90+5'	Report	Awatari 20'; Sato 90+1'	Stadium: IAI Stadium Nihondaira; Attendance: 4,609; Referee: Kaku Hirose

16 October 2013 #61	Yokohama F. Marinos (1)	3–1	Tochigi SC (2)	Kanagawa-ku
19:00	Marquinhos 5', 26', 62'	Report	Sabia 18'	Stadium: Nippatsu Mitsuzawa Stadium; Attendance: 3,659; Referee: Takehiro Yamamoto

13 October 2013 #62	Omiya Ardija (1)	0–0 (a.e.t.) (4–3 p)	Gamba Osaka (2)	Kumagaya
13:00		Report		Stadium: Kumagaya Athletic Stadium; Attendance: 5,254; Referee: Hajime Matsuo
	Penalties
	Shimohira (penalty scored); Hashimoto (penalty missed); Ueda (penalty scored); Suzuki (penalty scored); Kikuchi (penalty scored)		(penalty scored) Usami; (penalty missed) Niwa; (penalty missed) Fujiharu; (penalty scored) Abe; (penalty scored) Futagawa

13 October 2013 #63	Matsumoto Yamaga FC (2)	1–3 (a.e.t.)	Sagan Tosu (1)	Matsumoto
13:00	Shiozawa 67'	Report	Takahashi 30'; Toyoda 114' (pen.), 117'	Stadium: Matsumotodaira Football Stadium; Attendance: 8,789; Referee: Takehiro Yamamoto

13 October 2013 #64	Júbilo Iwata (1)	0–1	Consadole Sapporo (2)	Iwata
13:00		Report	Kanda 67'	Stadium: Yamaha Stadium; Attendance: 3,194; Referee: Yosuke Kubota

13 October 2013 #65	Vegalta Sendai (1)	1–1 (a.e.t.) (3–1 p)	Mito HollyHock (2)	Sendai
13:00	Akamine 15'	Report	Hosokawa 9'	Stadium: Yurtec Stadium Sendai; Attendance: 6,053; Referee: Takuto Okabe
	Penalties
	Ota (penalty scored); Ryang Yong-Gi (penalty scored); Kamata (penalty scored)		Suzuki (penalty scored); Hashimoto (penalty missed); Yamamura (penalty missed); Ishigami (penalty missed)

13 October 2013 #66	Albirex Niigata (1)	0–1 (a.e.t.)	Oita Trinita (1)	Niigata
13:00		Report	Goto 92'	Stadium: Niigata Stadium; Attendance: 7,467; Referee: Takuya Maeda

13 October 2013 #67	Nagano Parceiro (3)	0–0 (a.e.t.) (4–2 p)	Giravanz Kitakyushu (2)	Nagoya
15:00		Report		Stadium: Mizuho Athletic Stadium; Attendance: 1,265; Referee: Tomohiro Inoue
	Penalties
	Unozawa (penalty scored); Takano (penalty scored); Arinaga (penalty scored); Nozawa (penalty scored)		Ikemoto (penalty scored); Kotegawa (penalty missed); Inoue (penalty scored); Arai (penalty missed)

13 October 2013 #68	JEF United Ichihara Chiba (2)	1–1 (a.e.t.) (5–6 p)	FC Tokyo (1)	Chiba
19:00	Fukai 90'	Report	Lucas 41' (pen.)	Stadium: Fukuda Denshi Arena; Attendance: 9,347; Referee: Yoshiro Imamura
	Penalties
	Yamaguchi (penalty scored); Fukai (penalty scored); Yonekura (penalty scored); Takeuchi (penalty missed); Otsuka (penalty scored); Yazawa (penalty missed); Sato (penalty scored); Takahashi (penalty missed)		Lucas (penalty scored); Ota (penalty scored); Hirayama (penalty scored); Kawano (penalty missed); Hasegawa (penalty scored); Takahashi (penalty missed); Yonemoto (penalty scored); Tokunaga (penalty scored)

16 October 2013 #69	Urawa Red Diamonds (1)	2–3	Montedio Yamagata (2)	Urawa-ku
19:00	Sakano 41'; Kunimoto 76'	Report	Ito 39'; Miyasaka 67'; Frank 79'	Stadium: Urawa Komaba Stadium; Attendance: 5,890; Referee: Hiroyuki Kimura

13 October 2013 #70	Cerezo Osaka (1)	4–0	Vissel Kobe (2)	Higashisumiyoshi-ku
13:00	Fábio 15'; Edamura 31', 56'; Sugimoto 50'	Report		Stadium: Kincho Stadium; Attendance: 9,013; Referee: Kenji Ogiya

16 October 2013 #71	Kashiwa Reysol (1)	1–0	Fagiano Okayama (2)	Kashiwa
19:00	Cléo 89'	Report		Stadium: Hitachi Kashiwa Soccer Stadium; Attendance: 2,838; Referee: Shinji Murakami

14 October 2013 #72	Kashima Antlers (1)	2–1	Kyoto Sanga FC (2)	Kashima
13:00	Endo 54'; Davi 67'	Report	Yokotani 75'	Stadium: Kashima Soccer Stadium; Attendance: 5,574; Referee: Toshimitsu Yoshida

== Fourth round ==
The draw for the remaining rounds of the tournament was held on October 20. Only three teams outside the top flight remain: Consadole Sapporo and Montedio Yamagata of J.League Division 2 and Nagano Parceiro of the Japan Football League.

Matches between J1 sides were played on November 16; matches involving J2 or JFL clubs were played on November 20 to avoid scheduling conflicts.

16 November 2013 #73	Kashiwa Reysol (1)	0–1	Oita Trinita (1)	Okayama
13:00		Report	Nishi 90+1'	Stadium: Kanko Stadium; Attendance: 2,510; Referee: Toshimitsu Yoshida

20 November 2013 #74	Yokohama F. Marinos (1)	2–1 (a.e.t.)	Nagano Parceiro (3)	Yokohama
19:00	Sato 31'; Fujita 97'	Report	Unozawa 38'	Stadium: Nissan Stadium; Attendance: 6,319; Referee: Yoshiro Imamura

16 November 2013 #75	Cerezo Osaka (1)	1–2	Sagan Tosu (1)	Higashisumiyoshi-ku
17:00	Edno 22'	Report	Kanai 5'; Toyoda 87'	Stadium: Kincho Stadium; Attendance: 6,456; Referee: Hajime Matsuo

20 November 2013 #76	Kawasaki Frontale (1)	2–0	Montedio Yamagata (2)	Kawasaki
19:00	Ōkubo 44', 77'	Report		Stadium: Todoroki Athletics Stadium; Attendance: 5,231; Referee: Takehiro Yamamoto

16 November 2013 #77	Shimizu S-Pulse (1)	0–1	Vegalta Sendai (1)	Shimizu-ku
13:00		Report	Yong-Gi Ryang 82'	Stadium: IAI Stadium Nihondaira; Attendance: 5,019; Referee: Hiroyuki Kimura

16 November 2013 #78	Omiya Ardija (1)	0–3	FC Tokyo (1)	Ōmiya-ku
19:00		Report	Mita 45+1'; Watanabe 54'; Ota 82'	Stadium: NACK5 Stadium Omiya; Attendance: 8,434; Referee: Keigi Takayama

16 November 2013 #79	Kashima Antlers (1)	1–3	Sanfrecce Hiroshima (1)	Kashima
15:00	Ito 79'	Report	Takahagi 28', 45+1'; Shiotani 41'	Stadium: Kashima Soccer Stadium; Attendance: 5,710; Referee: Takuto Okabe

20 November 2013 #80	Ventforet Kofu (1)	1–0 (a.e.t.)	Consadole Sapporo (2)	Higashi-ku
19:00	Patric 113'	Report		Stadium: Kumamoto Athletics Stadium; Attendance: 523; Referee: Shinji Murakami

== Quarterfinals ==
The four quarter-final matches, all featuring J.League Division 1 clubs, were played on December 22.

22 December 2013 #81	Oita Trinita (1)	1–2 (a.e.t.)	Yokohama F. Marinos (1)	Ōita
	Morishima 83'	Report	Kurihara 72'; Tomisawa 94'	Stadium: Ōita Bank Dome; Attendance: 8,875; Referee: Ryuji Sato

22 December 2013 #82	Sagan Tosu (1)	2–0 (a.e.t.)	Kawasaki Frontale (1)	Tosu
	Niwa 100'; Mizunuma 112'	Report		Stadium: Tosu Stadium; Attendance: 11,123; Referee: Minoru Tōjō

22 December 2013 #83	Vegalta Sendai (1)	1–2 (a.e.t.)	FC Tokyo (1)	Sendai
	Wilson 3'	Report	Ota 90+3'; Hayashi 120'	Stadium: Yurtec Stadium Sendai; Attendance: 15,018; Referee: Masaaki Toma

22 December 2013 #84	Sanfrecce Hiroshima (1)	1–1 (a.e.t.) (3–2 p)	Ventforet Kofu (1)	Hiroshima
	Satō 23'	Report	Chiba 45' (o.g.)	Stadium: Hiroshima Big Arch; Attendance: 11,181; Referee: Jumpei Iida
	Penalties
	Aoyama (penalty scored); Mizumoto (penalty scored); Park Hyung-Jin (penalty scored); Mikić (penalty missed)		(penalty scored) Gilsinho; (penalty missed) Fukuda; (penalty scored) Miyuki; (penalty missed) Mizuno; (penalty missed) Marquinhos Paraná

== Semifinals ==
29 December 2013 #85	Yokohama F. Marinos (1)	2–0	Sagan Tosu (1)	Yokohama
13:06	Hyodo 86'; Nakamura 90+4'	Report		Stadium: Nissan Stadium; Attendance: 22,630; Referee: Hiroyoshi Takayama

29 December 2013 #86	FC Tokyo (1)	0–0 (a.e.t.) (4–5 p)	Sanfrecce Hiroshima (1)	Tokyo
15:04		Report		Stadium: Tokyo National Stadium; Attendance: 26,709; Referee: Shinji Murakami
	Penalties
	Ota (penalty scored); Morishige (penalty scored); Jang Hyun-Soo (penalty scored); Mita (penalty missed); Hasegawa (penalty missed); Yonemoto (penalty scored); Ishikawa (penalty missed)		(penalty missed) Aoyama; (penalty scored) Mizumoto; (penalty missed) Chiba; (penalty scored) Nishikawa; (penalty scored) Shiotani; (penalty scored) Asano; (penalty scored) Notsuda

== Final ==
1 January 2014 #87	Yokohama F. Marinos (1)	2–0	Sanfrecce Hiroshima (1)	National Olympic Stadium, Tokyo
14:04	Saitō 17'; Nakazawa 21'	Report		Attendance: 46,599; Referee: Yuichi Nishimura
