= 2016 Sanfrecce Hiroshima season =

Sanfrecce Hiroshima
2016 season
- Chairman: Kaoru Koyano
- Manager: Hajime Moriyasu
- Stadium: Hiroshima Big Arch
- J1 League: First stage: 4th Second stage: 8th Overall: 4th
- Japanese Super Cup: Winners
- AFC Champions League: Group stage
Home colours	Away colours

The 2016 Sanfrecce Hiroshima season was the club's eighth consecutive season in J1 League, and 46th overall in the Japanese top flight. Sanfrecce Hiroshima are also competing in the 2016 Japanese Super Cup and the 2016 AFC Champions League.

== Squad ==
As of 2 March 2016

Squad No.	Name	Nationality	Position(s)	Date of birth (age)
Goalkeepers
1	Takuto Hayashi	(Japan)	GK	9 August 1982 (aged 33)
13	Takuya Masuda	(Japan)	GK	29 June 1989 (aged 26)
21	Ryotaro Hironaga	(Japan)	GK	9 January 1990 (aged 25)
Defenders
2	Yuki Nogami	(Japan)	DF	20 April 1991 (aged 24)
4	Hiroki Mizumoto	(Japan)	CB	12 September 1985 (aged 30)
5	Kazuhiko Chiba	(Japan)	DF / DM	21 June 1985 (aged 30)
19	Sho Sasaki	(Japan)	DF	2 October 1989 (aged 26)
26	Yasumasa Kawasaki	(Japan)	DF	20 August 1992 (aged 23)
33	Tsukasa Shiotani	(Japan)	DF	5 December 1988 (aged 27)
34	Soya Takahashi	(Japan)	DF	29 February 1996 (aged 19)
35	Naoki Otani	(Japan)	DF	24 September 1995 (aged 20)
Midfielders
6	Toshihiro Aoyama	(Japan)	DM	22 February 1986 (aged 29)
7	Kōji Morisaki	(Japan)	MF	9 May 1981 (aged 34)
8	Kazuyuki Morisaki	(Japan)	MF	9 May 1981 (aged 34)
14	Mihael Mikić	(Croatia)	RW	6 January 1980 (aged 35)
16	Kohei Shimizu	(Japan)	MF / ST	30 April 1989 (aged 26)
18	Yoshifumi Kashiwa	(Japan)	MF	28 July 1987 (aged 28)
24	Yoichi Naganuma	(Japan)	MF	14 April 1997 (aged 18)
25	Yusuke Chajima	(Japan)	AM	20 July 1991 (aged 24)
28	Takuya Marutani	(Japan)	DM	30 May 1989 (aged 26)
29	Tsukasa Morishima	(Japan)	MF	25 April 1997 (aged 18)
30	Kosei Shibasaki	(Japan)	MF	28 August 1984 (aged 31)
37	Kazuya Miyahara	(Japan)	MF	22 March 1996 (aged 19)
Strikers
9	Peter Utaka	(Nigeria)	FW	12 February 1984 (aged 31)
11	Hisato Satō	(Japan)	ST	12 March 1982 (aged 33)
22	Yusuke Minagawa	(Japan)	FW	9 October 1991 (aged 24)
31	Takumi Miyayoshi	(Japan)	ST	7 August 1992 (aged 23)
44	Anderson Lopes	(Brazil)	ST	15 September 1993 (aged 22)

== Transfers ==
=== Winter ===
==== In ====
Date from	Position	Nationality	Name	From	Type
31 December 2015	MF	(South Korea)	Park Hyung-jin	(Japan) Tochigi SC	Loan return
31 December 2015	DF	(Japan)	Hironori Ishikawa	(Japan) Mito HollyHock	Loan return
1 January 2016	MF	(Japan)	Tsukasa Morishima	(Japan) Tsu Technical High School	Transfer
1 January 2016	MF	(Japan)	Yoichi Naganuma	(Japan) Sanfrecce Hiroshima Youth	Promotion
4 January 2016	DF	(Japan)	Naoki Otani	(Japan) Roasso Kumamoto	Loan return
6 January 2016	FW	(Japan)	Takumi Miyayoshi	(Japan) Kyoto Sanga	Transfer
7 January 2016	MF	(South Korea)	Kim Byeom-yong	(Japan) Montedio Yamagata	Transfer
26 January 2016	MF	(Japan)	Kota Sameshima	(Japan) AC Nagano Parceiro	Loan return
2 February 2016	FW	(Nigeria)	Peter Utaka	(Japan) Shimizu S-Pulse	Loan

==== Out ====
Date from	Position	Nationality	Name	To	Type
31 December 2015	FW	(Brazil)	Douglas	(Japan) Tokushima Vortis	Loan return
6 January 2016	MF	(South Korea)	Park Hyung-jin	(Japan) V-Varen Nagasaki	Transfer
8 January 2016	DF	(Japan)	Hironori Ishikawa	(Japan) Thespakusatsu Gunma	Transfer
15 January 2016	MF	(Japan)	Satoru Yamagishi	(Japan) Ōita Trinita	Transfer
27 January 2016	MF	(Japan)	Kota Sameshima	(Japan) Fujieda MYFC	Transfer
1 April 2016	MF	(Japan)	Gakuto Notsuda	(Japan) Albirex Niigata	Loan

=== Summer ===
==== In ====
Date from	Position	Nationality	Name	From	Type
9 July 2016	FW	(Brazil)	Anderson Lopes	(Brazil) Tombense	Loan
11 July 2016	DF	(Japan)	Yuki Nogami	(Japan) Yokohama FC	Transfer

==== Out ====
Date from	Position	Nationality	Name	To	Type
13 July 2016	MF	(South Korea)	Kim Byeom-yong	(Japan) Shimizu S-Pulse	Loan
18 July 2016	FW	(Japan)	Takuma Asano	(England) Arsenal	Transfer
25 July 2016	DF	(South Korea)	Kyohei Yoshino	(Japan) Kyoto Sanga	Loan

== Competitions ==
=== Overall ===
Competition	Started round	Current position / round	Final position / round	First match	Last match
J1 League	—	4th		27 February 2016	
Champions League	Group stage	—		23 February 2016	4 May 2016
Japanese Super Cup	Final	—	Winners	20 February 2016	

Updated to match played 30 June 2016
Source: Competitions

=== Overview ===
Competition	Record							
Competition	G	W	D	L	GF	GA	GD	Win %
J1 League	27	13	7	7	50	30	+20	48.15
Japanese Super Cup	1	1	0	0	3	1	+2	100.00
Champions League	6	3	0	3	9	8	+1	50.00
Total	34	17	7	10	62	39	+23	50.00

Updated to match played 28 August 2016
Source: Competitions

=== Japanese Super Cup ===
Win Draw Loss Upcoming fixture

20 February 2015	Sanfrecce Hiroshima	3–1	Gamba Osaka	Nissan Stadium, Yokohama
13:35 JST	Sasaki (yellow card) 38'; Satō 51'; Asano 57'; Utaka 73' (yellow card) 88'	Summary	Ideguchi (yellow card) 45+1'; Niwa (yellow card) 55'; Usami 68'	Attendance: 33,805; Referee: Jumpei Iida

=== J1 League ===
==== First stage ====
Pos	Team	Pld	W	D	L	GF	GA	GD	Pts
2	Kawasaki Frontale	17	11	5	1	33	15	+18	38
3	Urawa Red Diamonds	17	10	3	4	26	16	+10	33
4	Sanfrecce Hiroshima	17	8	5	4	32	18	+14	29
5	Omiya Ardija	17	7	5	5	17	18	−1	26
6	Gamba Osaka	17	7	3	7	22	20	+2	24

Source: 2016 MEIJI YASUDA J1 LEAGUE 1st Stage League table
Rules for classification: 1) Points; 2) Goal difference; 3) Goals scored.

===== Results summary =====
Overall								Home						Away					
Pld	W	D	L	GF	GA	GD	Pts	W	D	L	GF	GA	GD	W	D	L	GF	GA	GD
17	8	5	4	32	18	+14	29	4	2	2	14	8	+6	4	3	2	18	10	+8

Last updated: 30 June 2016.
Source: Competitive matches

===== Results by matchday =====
Matchday	1	2	3	4	5	6	7	8	9	10	11	12	13	14	15	16	17
Ground	H	A	H	A	H	A	H	A	A	H	H	H	A	A	A	H	A
Result	L	D	D	W	W	L	W	W	L	W	D	L	W	D	D	W	W
Position	13	16	16	11	7	10	5	4	7	7	6	6	8	6	5	4	4

Updated to match(es) played on 30 June. Source:
A = Away; H = Home; W = Win; D = Draw; L = Loss

===== Matches =====
Win Draw Loss Upcoming fixture

27 February 2016 1	Sanfrecce Hiroshima	0–1	Kawasaki Frontale	Hiroshima
12:00 JST		Report	Kobayashi 84'	Stadium: Hiroshima Big Arch; Attendance: 18,120; Referee: Yuichi Nishimura

6 March 2016 2	Nagoya Grampus	1–1	Sanfrecce Hiroshima	Toyota
13:00 JST	Simović 17'; Lee Seung-hee (yellow card) 28'; Öhman (yellow card) 68'	Report	Satō 45'; Aoyama (yellow card) 60'; Chiba (yellow card) 65'	Stadium: Toyota Stadium; Attendance: 27,061; Referee: Koichiro Fukushima

12 March 2016 3	Sanfrecce Hiroshima	2–2	Shonan Bellmare	Hiroshima
11:00 JST	Utaka 67' (pen.); S. Fujita 90+5' (o.g.)	Report	Paulinho 46'; Y. Fujita 71'	Stadium: Hiroshima Big Arch; Attendance: 13,460; Referee: Hiroyuki Kimura

20 March 2016 4	Omiya Ardija	1–5	Sanfrecce Hiroshima	Ōmiya-ku, Saitama
14:00 JST	Pečnik (yellow card) 31'; Mrđa (yellow card) 53'; Yokotani 60'; Komoto (yellow card) 76'; Ienaga (yellow card) 79'; Yokoyama (yellow card) 90+3'	Report	Utaka 22'; Asano 39'; Aoyama 67'; Kashiwa 73'; Shibasaki 89'	Stadium: NACK5 Stadium Omiya; Attendance: 13,452; Referee: Hiroyoshi Takayama

1 April 2016 5	Sanfrecce Hiroshima	3–0	Vegalta Sendai	Hiroshima
17:30 JST	Utaka 51' (pen.), 55'; Chajima 62'; Miyahara (yellow card) 90+2'	Report	Oiwa (yellow card) 90+4'	Stadium: Hiroshima Big Arch; Attendance: 9,587; Referee: Hajime Matsuo

10 April 2016 6	Kashima Antlers	4–1	Sanfrecce Hiroshima	Kashima
14:00 JST	Doi 8'; Shibasaki 57'; Caio 61', 90+3'; Ogasawara (yellow card) 85'	Report	Utaka 38'; Miyayoshi (yellow card) 87'	Stadium: Kashima Soccer Stadium; Attendance: 19,764; Referee: Yuichi Nishimura

15 April 2016 7	Sanfrecce Hiroshima	1–0	Albirex Niigata	Hiroshima
17:00 JST	Chajima (yellow card) 25'; Kawanami 56' (o.g.); Kazuyuki Morisaki (yellow card) 57'; Chiba (yellow card) 65'	Report	Léo Silva (yellow card) 54'; Sakai (yellow card) 71'	Stadium: Hiroshima Big Arch; Attendance: 8,602; Referee: Bumpei Ueda

24 April 2016 8	Yokohama F. Marinos	1–2	Sanfrecce Hiroshima	Kōhoku-ku, Yokohama
12:00 JST	Nakamura 70' (pen.); Fábio Aguiar (yellow card) 90'	Report	Utaka 15', 72'; Chiba (yellow card) 68'	Stadium: International Stadium Yokohama; Attendance: 25,106; Referee: Yudai Yamamoto

29 April 2016 9	Júbilo Iwata	1–0	Sanfrecce Hiroshima	Iwata
12:00 JST	Fujita (yellow card) 55'; Nakamura 65'	Report	Yoshino (yellow card) 59'	Stadium: Yamaha Stadium; Attendance: 14,379; Referee: Masaaki Toma

8 May 2016 10	Sanfrecce Hiroshima	3–0	Sagan Tosu	Hiroshima
14:00 JST	Chajima 2'; Utaka 33', 52'	Report		Stadium: Hiroshima Big Arch; Attendance: 16,733; Referee: Nobutsugu Murakami

13 May 2016 11	Sanfrecce Hiroshima	0–0	Kashiwa Reysol	Hiroshima
17:30 JST	Mikić (yellow card) 12'	Report	Wako (yellow card) 74'	Stadium: Hiroshima Big Arch; Attendance: 8,956; Referee: Hajime Matsuo

21 May 2016 12	Sanfrecce Hiroshima	1–3	Gamba Osaka	Hiroshima
14:00 JST	Aoyama (yellow card) 32'; Mikić (yellow card) 75'; Utaka 90+4'	Report	Ademilson 23'; Kurata 64'; Nagasawa 82'	Stadium: Hiroshima Big Arch; Attendance: 17,220; Referee: Takuto Okabe

29 May 2016 13	Avispa Fukuoka	0–4	Sanfrecce Hiroshima	Hakata-ku, Fukuoka
12:00 JST		Report	Utaka 18'; Miyayoshi 31', 53'; Shibasaki 36'	Stadium: Level5 Stadium; Attendance: 13,264; Referee: Itaru Hirose

11 June 2016 14	Vissel Kobe	1–1	Sanfrecce Hiroshima	Kobe
14:00 JST	Pedro Júnior 13'; Leandro (yellow card) 41'; Watanabe (yellow card) 80'	Report	Utaka 3'	Stadium: Misaki Park Stadium; Attendance: 14,509; Referee: Hiroyuki Kimura

15 June 2016 15	FC Tokyo	1–1	Sanfrecce Hiroshima	Chōfu, Tokyo
17:00 JST	Kawano (yellow card) 66'; Hashimoto 69'	Report	Asano 66'; Miyahara (yellow card) 81'	Stadium: Ajinomoto Stadium; Attendance: 15,358; Referee: Ryuji Sato

18 June 2016 16	Sanfrecce Hiroshima	4–2	Urawa Red Diamonds	Hiroshima
17:00 JST	Shibasaki 6'; Miyahara (yellow card) 50'; Shiotani 64', 69'; Satō 83'	Report	Sekine 26'; Ugajin 40'	Stadium: Hiroshima Big Arch; Attendance: 24,656; Referee: Hajime Matsuo

25 June 2016 17	Ventforet Kofu	0–3	Sanfrecce Hiroshima	Kōfu
17:00 JST	Hashizume (yellow card) 13'; Matsuhashi (yellow card) 69'	Report	Shibasaki 16' (yellow card) 61'; Marutani (yellow card) 65'; Shiotani 74'; Utaka 80'	Stadium: Yamanashi Chuo Bank Stadium; Attendance: 11,816; Referee: Masuya Ueda

==== Second stage ====
Pos	Team	Pld	W	D	L	GF	GA	GD	Pts
8	Sagan Tosu	17	8	5	4	26	22	+4	29
9	FC Tokyo	17	9	2	6	23	21	+2	29
10	Sanfrecce Hiroshima	17	8	2	7	26	22	+4	26
11	Kashima Antlers	17	6	2	9	24	24	0	20
12	Vegalta Sendai	17	6	2	9	19	23	−4	20

Source: 2016 MEIJI YASUDA J1 LEAGUE 2nd Stage League table
Rules for classification: 1) Points; 2) Goal difference; 3) Goals scored.

===== Results summary =====
Overall								Home						Away					
Pld	W	D	L	GF	GA	GD	Pts	W	D	L	GF	GA	GD	W	D	L	GF	GA	GD
10	5	2	3	18	12	+6	17	3	1	2	11	7	+4	2	1	1	7	5	+2

Last updated: 28 August 2016.
Source: Competitive matches

===== Results by matchday =====
Matchday	1	2	3	4	5	6	7	8	9	10	11	12	13	14	15	16	17
Ground	H	H	A	H	H	A	H	A	H	A	H	A	A	H	A	H	A
Result	W	L	D	D	W	L	W	W	L	W							
Position	3	8	9	10	6	8	7	6	8	8							

Updated to match(es) played on 30 July. Source:
A = Away; H = Home; W = Win; D = Draw; L = Loss

===== Matches =====
Win Draw Loss Upcoming fixture

2 July 2016 1	Sanfrecce Hiroshima	3–0	Júbilo Iwata	Hiroshima
17:00 JST	Shibasaki 19', 32'; Utaka 65'	Report	Yamamoto (yellow card) 61'	Stadium: Hiroshima Big Arch; Attendance: 14,502; Referee: Futoshi Nakamura

9 July 2016 2	Sanfrecce Hiroshima	2–4	Kashima Antlers	Hiroshima
17:00 JST	Asano 54', 82'	Report	Endo 33'; Kanazaki 49'; Hayashi 56' (o.g.); Nakamura 58'; Shibasaki (yellow card) 69'	Stadium: Hiroshima Big Arch; Attendance: 16,551; Referee: Itaru Hirose

13 July 2016 3	Kashiwa Reysol	3–3	Sanfrecce Hiroshima	Kashiwa
17:00 JST	Nakayama 5'; Nakatani (yellow card) 42'; Digeo Oliveira 56'; Cristiano 61' (pen.)	Report	Marutani 31'; Shiotani 43'; Shibasaki 45+1'	Stadium: Hitachi Kashiwa Soccer Stadium; Attendance: 7,090; Referee: Hiroyuki Kimura

17 July 2016 4	Sanfrecce Hiroshima	2–2	Yokohama F. Marinos	Hiroshima
17:00 JST	Marutani (yellow card) 50'; Minagawa 81'; Satō 83'	Report	Fábio Aguiar 31'; Martinus (yellow card) 87'; Ito 88'	Stadium: Hiroshima Big Arch; Attendance: 25,845; Referee: Nobutsugu Murakami

23 July 2016 5	Sanfrecce Hiroshima	2–0	Vissel Kobe	Hiroshima
17:00 JST	Utaka 45+1'; Miyaykoshi 60'	Report	Nílton (yellow card) 17'; Pedro Júnior (yellow card) 80'; Fujita (yellow card) 82'	Stadium: Hiroshima Big Arch; Attendance: 12,310; Referee: Yuichi Nishimura

30 July 2016 6	Gamba Osaka	1–0	Sanfrecce Hiroshima	Suita
17:00 JST	Abe 2'; Higashiguchi (yellow card) 69'	Report		Stadium: Suita City Football Stadium; Attendance: 32,444; Referee: Masuya Ueda

6 August 2016 7	Sanfrecce Hiroshima	2–0	Nagoya Grampus	Hiroshima
17:00 JST	Utaka 2'; Miyaoshi 22'; Shimizu (yellow card) 84'	Report	Lee Seung-hee (yellow card) 90'	Stadium: Hiroshima Big Arch; Attendance: 12,911; Referee: Kazuyoshi Enomoto

13 August 2016 8	Shonan Bellmare	1–2	Sanfrecce Hiroshima	Hiratsuka
16:30 JST	Hanato 20'; Ishikawa (yellow card) 73'; Weslley (yellow card) 90'	Report	Utaka 43'; Marutani 60'	Stadium: Shonan BMW Stadium Hiratsuka; Attendance: 11,376; Referee: Shoichiro Mikami

20 August 2016 9	Sanfrecce Hiroshima	0–1	Ventforet Kofu	Hiroshima
17:00 JST	Marutani (yellow card) 15'	Report	Kawata (yellow card) 59'; Tanaka 77'; Inagaki (yellow card) 90+4'	Stadium: Hiroshima Big Arch; Attendance: 11,853; Referee: Yudai Yamamoto

27 August 2016 10	Vegalta Sendai	0–2	Sanfrecce Hiroshima	Sendai
17:00 JST		Report	Aoyama 30'; Kashiwa (yellow card) 40'; Shibasaki 78'	Stadium: Yurtec Stadium Sendai; Attendance: 14,486; Referee: Takuto Okabe

==== Overall results ====
Pos	Team	Pld	W	D	L	GF	GA	GD	Pts	Qualification or relegation
4	Gamba Osaka	34	17	7	10	53	42	+11	58	Champions League play-off round (Note: The winner of the 2016 Emperor's Cup qualified for the Group Stage of the 2017 AFC Champions League. Since the Emperor's Cup winner Kashima Antlers had already qualified for the AFC Champions League, the play-off round spot was awarded to the fourth-placed team.)
5	Omiya Ardija	34	15	11	8	41	36	+5	56	
6	Sanfrecce Hiroshima	34	16	7	11	58	40	+18	55	
7	Vissel Kobe	34	16	7	11	56	43	+13	55	
8	Kashiwa Reysol	34	15	9	10	52	44	+8	54	

Source: Meiji Yasuda J1 League
Rules for classification: 1) Points; 2) Goal difference; 3) Goals scored.

===== Results summary =====
Overall								Home						Away					
Pld	W	D	L	GF	GA	GD	Pts	W	D	L	GF	GA	GD	W	D	L	GF	GA	GD
27	13	7	7	50	30	+20	46	7	3	4	25	15	+10	6	4	3	25	15	+10

Last updated: 28 August 2016.
Source: Competitive matches

=== AFC Champions League ===
Sanfrecce Hiroshima qualified for the group stage of the 2016 AFC Champions League by winning the 2015 J1 League. They were drawn in Group F along with China's Shandong Luneng Taishan, Korean outfit FC Seoul, and Buriram United from Thailand. Sanfrecce Hiroshima were automatically eliminated on 20 April after a 1–0 loss against Shandong Luneng Taishan, making a four-point gap with one game left.

==== Group stage ====
Pos	Team	Pld	W	D	L	GF	GA	GD	Pts	Qualification	SEO	SHD	HIR	BUR
1	(South Korea) FC Seoul	6	4	1	1	17	5	+12	13	Advance to knockout stage	—	0–0	4–1	2–1
2	(China) Shandong Luneng	6	3	2	1	7	5	+2	11	Advance to knockout stage	1–4	—	1–0	3–0
3	(Japan) Sanfrecce Hiroshima	6	3	0	3	9	8	+1	9		2–1	1–2	—	3–0
4	(Thailand) Buriram United	6	0	1	5	1	16	−15	1		0–6	0–0	0–2	—

Source: AFC
Rules for classification: Group stage tiebreakers

Win Draw Loss Upcoming fixture

23 February 2016	Sanfrecce Hiroshima (Japan)	1–2	(China) Shandong Luneng	Hiroshima Big Arch, Hiroshima
19:00 UTC+9	Shimizu 64'	Report	Yang Xu (yellow card) 32' (goal) 67'; Tardelli 78'	Attendance: 5,809; Referee: Nawaf Shukralla (Bahrain)

1 March 2016	FC Seoul (South Korea)	4–1	(Japan) Sanfrecce Hiroshima	Seoul World Cup Stadium, Seoul
14:00 UTC+9	Kim Won-sik 31'; Adriano 49', 56', 69'	Report	Chiba 25'	Attendance: 18,115; Referee: Adham Makhadmeh (Jordan)

16 March 2016	Sanfrecce Hiroshima (Japan)	3–0	(Thailand) Buriram United	Hiroshima Big Arch, Hiroshima
19:00 UTC+9	Asano 42', 55'; Sasaki (yellow card) 45'; Shimizu 81'	Report	Kannoo (yellow card) 85'	Attendance: 6,411; Referee: Nawaf Shukralla (Bahrain)

5 April 2016	Buriram United (Thailand)	0–2	(Japan) Sanfrecce Hiroshima	New I-Mobile Stadium, Buriram
18:00 UTC+7	Kaio (yellow card) 69'	Report	Miyayoshi 45'; Shibasaki 87'; Mizumoto (yellow card) 71'; Shimizu (yellow card) 78'	Attendance: 5,532; Referee: Fahad Al-Mirdasi (Saudi Arabia)

20 April 2016	Shandong Luneng (China)	1–0	(Japan) Sanfrecce Hiroshima	Jinan Olympic Sports Center Stadium, Jinan
19:30 UTC+8	Diego Tardelli 10'; Wang Tong (yellow card) 31'; Zheng Zheng (yellow card) 71'; Wang Yongpo (yellow card) 90+2'	Report	Takahashi (yellow card) 49'	Attendance: 24,799; Referee: Ammar Ali Aljneibi (Saudi Arabia)

4 May 2016	Sanfrecce Hiroshima (Japan)	2–1	(South Korea) FC Seoul	Hiroshima Big Arch, Hiroshima
19:30 UTC+9	Asano 27'; Minagawa 39'; Takahashi (yellow card) 81'	Report	Shim Je-hyeok (yellow card) 76'; Adriano 88'	Attendance: 13,328; Referee: Crishantha Dilan Perera (Sri Lanka)

== Statistics ==
=== Appearances and goals ===
Last updated on 28 August 2016.

No.	Pos	Nat	Player	Total		J1 League		Champions League		Super Cup	
No.	Pos	Nat	Player	Apps	Goals	Apps	Goals	Apps	Goals	Apps	Goals
1	GK	(Japan) JPN	Takuto Hayashi	33	0	27	0	5	0	1	0
2	DF	(Japan) JPN	Yuki Nogami	1	0	0+1	0	0	0	0	0
4	DF	(Japan) JPN	Hiroki Mizumoto	16	0	11	0	5	0	0	0
5	DF	(Japan) JPN	Kazuhiko Chiba	32	1	26	0	5	1	1	0
6	MF	(Japan) JPN	Toshihiro Aoyama	26	2	18+3	2	4	0	1	0
7	MF	(Japan) JPN	Kōji Morisaki	2	0	0+1	0	0+1	0	0	0
8	MF	(Japan) JPN	Kazuyuki Morisaki	23	0	21	0	0+1	0	1	0
9	FW	(Nigeria) NGR	Peter Utaka	29	18	25+1	17	2	0	0+1	1
11	FW	(Japan) JPN	Hisato Satō	17	4	7+7	3	2	0	1	1
13	GK	(Japan) JPN	Takuya Masuda	1	0	0	0	1	0	0	0
14	MF	(Croatia) CRO	Mihael Mikić	24	0	19+3	0	0+1	0	1	0
16	MF	(Japan) JPN	Kohei Shimizu	32	2	14+12	0	6	2	0	0
18	MF	(Japan) JPN	Yoshifumi Kashiwa	33	1	26+1	1	3+2	0	1	0
19	DF	(Japan) JPN	Sho Sasaki	6	0	4	0	1	0	1	0
21	GK	(Japan) JPN	Ryotaro Hironaga	0	0	0	0	0	0	0	0
22	FW	(Japan) JPN	Yusuke Minagawa	21	2	0+15	1	2+4	1	0	0
24	MF	(Japan) JPN	Yoichi Naganuma	0	0	0	0	0	0	0	0
25	MF	(Japan) JPN	Yusuke Chajima	21	2	10+8	2	2	0	1	0
26	DF	(Japan) JPN	Yasumasa Kawasaki	0	0	0	0	0	0	0	0
28	MF	(Japan) JPN	Takuya Marutani	21	2	11+3	2	6	0	0+1	0
29	MF	(Japan) JPN	Tsukasa Morishima	1	0	0	0	1	0	0	0
30	MF	(Japan) JPN	Kosei Shibasaki	32	9	27	8	0+4	1	1	0
31	FW	(Japan) JPN	Takumi Miyayoshi	16	5	6+5	4	4+1	1	0	0
33	DF	(Japan) JPN	Tsukasa Shiotani	29	4	23+1	4	4	0	1	0
34	DF	(Japan) JPN	Soya Takahashi	4	0	0+2	0	2	0	0	0
35	DF	(Japan) JPN	Naoki Otani	1	0	0	0	1	0	0	0
37	DF	(Japan) JPN	Kazuya Miyahara	14	0	12+1	0	1	0	0	0
44	FW	(Brazil) BRA	Anderson Lopes	3	0	1+2	0	0	0	0	0
Players who left the club in Winter/Summer transfer window or on loan:
10	FW	(Japan) JPN	Takuma Asano	19	8	7+7	4	4	3	0+1	1
17	MF	(Japan) JPN	Gakuto Notsuda	3	0	0	0	2+1	0	0	0
23	DF	(Japan) JPN	Kyohei Yoshino	3	0	1+1	0	1	0	0	0
27	MF	(South Korea) KOR	Kim Byeom-yong	4	0	0+2	0	2	0	0	0

=== Cards ===
Accounts for all competitions. Last updated on 28 August 2016.

No.	Pos.	Name	Yellow card	Red card
4	DF	(Japan) Hiroki Mizumoto	1	0
5	DF	(Japan) Kazuhiko Chiba	3	0
6	MF	(Japan) Toshihiro Aoyama	2	0
8	MF	(Japan) Kazuyuki Morisaki	1	0
9	FW	(Nigeria) Peter Utaka	1	0
14	MF	(Croatia) Mihael Mikić	2	0
16	MF	(Japan) Kohei Shimizu	2	0
18	MF	(Japan) Yoshifumi Kashiwa	1	0
19	DF	(Japan) Sho Sasaki	2	0
23	DF	(Japan) Kyohei Yoshino	1	0
25	MF	(Japan) Yusuke Chajima	1	0
28	MF	(Japan) Takuya Marutani	3	0
30	MF	(Japan) Kosei Shibasaki	1	0
34	DF	(Japan) Soya Takahashi	2	0
37	DF	(Japan) Kazuya Miyahara	3	0
