= Oh Seung-hoon =

Oh Seung-hoon may refer to:

- Oh Seung-hoon (footballer)
- Oh Seung-hoon (actor)
