= Kohei Mishima =

Japanese footballer (born 1987)

Kohei Mishima 三島 康平
Personal information
- Full name: Kohei Mishima
- Date of birth: April 15, 1987 (age 39)
- Place of birth: Urawa, Saitama, Japan
- Height: 1.83 m (6 ft 0 in)
- Position: Forward

Team information
- Current team: Coedo Kawagoe

Youth career
- 2003–2005: Urawa Higashi High School

College career
Years	Team	Apps	(Gls)
2006–2009	Komazawa University		

Senior career*
Years	Team	Apps	(Gls)
2010–2011	Vissel Kobe	4	(0)
2012–2016	Mito Hollyhock	130	(25)
2016–2018	Matsumoto Yamaga	35	(3)
2019	Roasso Kumamoto	22	(4)
2020–2021	SC Sagamihara	21	(1)
2021–2023	Maruyasu Okazaki	13	(0)
2023–	Coedo Kawagoe		
- * Club domestic league appearances and goals as of 03:23, 23 November 2023

Kohei Mishima (三島 康平, Mishima Kōhei; born April 15, 1987) is a Japanese football player for Coedo Kawagoe.

== Early life ==
Kohei was born in Urawa. He went to Komazawa University.

== Career ==
Kohei made his debut for Vissel against Nagoya Grampus on 23 September 2011.

Kohei made his debut for Mito against Ehime on 15 July 2012. He scored his first goal for the club against Fagiano Okayama in the 57th minute, on 20 March 2013.

Kohei made his debut for Matsumoto against Tokushima Vortis on 31 July 2016. He scored his first goal for the club against Ehime in the 79th minute.

Kohei made his debut for Roasso Kumamoto against Nagano Parceiro on 10 March 2019. He scored his first goal for the club against Cerezo Osaka U-23 on 31 August 2019, scoring in the 56th minute.

Kohei made his debut for Sagamihara against YSCC Yokohama on 27 June 2020. He scored his first goal for the club against Blaublitz Akita in the 90th+3rd minute.

== Career statistics ==
Updated to 23 February 2020.

Appearances and goals by club, season and competition
Club	Season	League			Emperor's Cup		J.League Cup		Total	
Club	Season	Division	Apps	Goals	Apps	Goals	Apps	Goals	Apps	Goals
Vissel Kobe	2010	J1 League	0	0	0	0	0	0	0	0
Vissel Kobe	2011	J1 League	4	0	0	0	0	0	4	0
Mito Hollyhock	2012	J2 League	9	0	1	0	—		10	0
Mito Hollyhock	2013	J2 League	32	4	2	1	—		34	5
Mito Hollyhock	2014	J2 League	35	5	2	0	—		37	5
Mito Hollyhock	2015	J2 League	33	7	3	0	—		36	7
Mito Hollyhock	2016	J2 League	23	9	0	0	—		23	9
Matsumoto Yamaga	2016	J2 League	15	3	2	2	—		17	5
Matsumoto Yamaga	2017	J2 League	18	0	3	2	—		21	2
Matsumoto Yamaga	2018	J2 League	2	0	0	0	—		2	0
Roasso Kumamoto	2019	J3 League	22	4	1	0	—		23	4
Career total			191	32	14	5	0	0	205	37
