= Kosei Ishigami =

Japanese footballer

Personal information
- Full name: Kosei Ishigami
- Date of birth: 11 January 1990 (age 36)
- Place of birth: Shizuoka, Japan
- Height: 1.71 m (5 ft 7 in)
- Position: Defender

College career
Years	Team	Apps	(Gls)
2008–2011	University of Tsukuba		

Senior career*
Years	Team	Apps	(Gls)
2012–2016	Mito HollyHock	90	(1)
2017	Gainare Tottori	13	(0)
Total		103	(1)
- * Club domestic league appearances and goals as of 23 February 2017

Kosei Ishigami (石神 幸征, Ishigami Kōsei; born 11 January 1990) is a Japanese former footballer.

== Club statistics ==
Updated to 23 February 2017.

Club performance			League		Cup		Total	
Season	Club	League	Apps	Goals	Apps	Goals	Apps	Goals
Japan			League		Emperor's Cup		Total	
2012	Mito HollyHock	J2 League	27	0	1	0	28	0
2013	Mito HollyHock	J2 League	27	1	2	0	29	1
2014	Mito HollyHock	J2 League	7	0	0	0	7	0
2015	Mito HollyHock	J2 League	21	0	2	0	23	0
2016	Mito HollyHock	J2 League	8	0	2	0	10	0
2017	Gainare Tottori	J3 League	13	0	1	0	14	0
Career total			103	1	8	0	111	1
