= Rodrigo Cabeça =

Brazilian footballer

Personal information
- Full name: Rodrigo Adeildo Souza Silva
- Date of birth: January 14, 1992 (age 34)
- Place of birth: Santo André, Brazil
- Height: 1.78 m (5 ft 10 in)
- Position: Forward

Team information
- Current team: Kataller Toyama
- Number: 29

Senior career*
| Years | Team | Apps | (Gls) |
| 2012–2014 | Desportivo Brasil | | |
| 2013 | → Matsumoto Yamaga (loan) | 14 | (3) |
| 2014 | Guaratinguetá | | |
| 2015–2016 | Al-Shabab Club | | |
| 2016 | Icasa | | |
| 2017– | Kataller Toyama | | |
- * Club domestic league appearances and goals as of 23 February 2017

Rodrigo Adeildo Souza Silva, known as Rodrigo Cabeça, (ホドリゴ・カベッサ | born January 14, 1992) is a Brazilian football player for Kataller Toyama.

== Club statistics ==
Updated to 23 February 2017.

| Club performance | | | League | | League Cup | | Total | |
| Season | Club | League | Apps | Goals | Apps | Goals | Apps | Goals |
| Japan | | | League | | J.League Cup | | Total | |
|---|---|---|---|---|---|---|---|---|
| 2013 | Matsumoto Yamaga | J2 League | 14 | 3 | 2 | 2 | 16 | 5 |
| Career total | | | 14 | 3 | 2 | 2 | 16 | 5 |
