= 2013 J.League Division 2 =

J.League Division 2
- Season: 2013
- Champions: Gamba Osaka; 1st J2 title 2nd D2 title
- Promoted: Gamba Osaka; Vissel Kobe; Tokushima Vortis
- Relegated: Gainare Tottori
- Matches: 462
- Goals: 1,212 (2.62 per match)
- Top goalscorer: Kempes (22 goals)
- Highest attendance: 24,813; Sapporo vs Kitakyushu
- Lowest attendance: 1,104; Ehime vs Kumamoto
- Average attendance: 6,665

The 2013 J.League Division 2 season was the 42nd season of the second-tier club football in Japan and the 15th season since the establishment of J2 League. The regular season began on 3 March and ended on 24 November, followed by the promotion play-offs among four clubs ranked between 3rd and 6th at the end of regular season. Gamba Osaka became champions, and Vissel Kobe became runners-up, both returned to J1 immediately after one season at J2. The other promoted team was third runners-up (fourth placers) Tokushima Vortis, who won the promotion playoff final, defeating Kyoto Sanga FC. With the win, Vortis made their J1 debut, becoming the first professional Shikoku football club to compete in the top division of their national league.

== Clubs ==
Ventforet Kofu and Shonan Bellmare, champions and runners-up in the previous season, and Oita Trinita, winners of the promotion play-offs for 2012, were promoted to J1, then Consadole Sapporo, Vissel Kobe, and Gamba Osaka were relegated to J2 instead. Sapporo returned to J2 only after one season in the top-flight, and Kobe returned to J2 second time after 2006 season, while Gamba suffered their very first relegation to the second-tier after J.League Division 2 was established in 1999, and the first relegation since their former organization, Matsushita Electric Soccer Club, were relegated after the 1986–87 season of JSL.

V-Varen Nagasaki, champions of the 2012 Japan Football League, were promoted to J2 while F.C. Machida Zelvia, promoted to J2 from the previous season and ranked 22nd, were relegated back to 2013 Japan Football League only after spending one season in J2.

In February, Thespa Kusatsu changed their name to Thespakusatsu Gunma.

Locations of the 2013 J.League 2 teams

The participant clubs were as follows:

Club name	Home town(s)	Stadium	Capacity	Note(s)
Avispa Fukuoka	Fukuoka	Best Denki Stadium	22,563	
Consadole Sapporo	Sapporo, Hokkaidō	Sapporo Dome	41,484	Relegated from J1 League in 2012
Ehime FC	All cities/towns in Ehime	Ningineer Stadium	20,000	
Fagiano Okayama	All cities/towns in Okayama	City Light Stadium	20,000	
Gainare Tottori	All cities/towns in Tottori	Axis Bird Stadium	16,033	
Gamba Osaka	Suita, Osaka	Expo '70 Commemorative Stadium	21,000	Relegated from J1 League in 2012
FC Gifu	All cities/towns in Gifu	Gifu Nagaragawa Stadium	26,109	
Giravanz Kitakyushu	Kitakyushu, Fukuoka	Honjo Athletic Stadium	10,000	
Mito HollyHock	Mito, Ibaraki	K's denki Stadium Mito	12,000	
JEF United Chiba	Chiba & Ichihara, Chiba	Fukuda Denshi Arena	19,781	
Kataller Toyama	All cities/towns in Toyama	Toyama Athletic Recreation Park Stadium	28,494	
Montedio Yamagata	All cities/towns in Yamagata	ND Soft Stadium	20,315	
Roasso Kumamoto	Kumamoto	Umakana-Yokana Stadium	32,000	
Kyoto Sanga	Southwestern cities/towns in Kyoto	Kyoto Nishikyogoku Stadium	20,242	
Thespakusatsu Gunma	All cities/towns in Gunma	Shoda Shoyu Stadium	15,253	
Tochigi SC	Utsunomiya, Tochigi	Tochigi Green Stadium	18,025	
Tokyo Verdy	All cities/towns in Tokyo	Ajinomoto Stadium	49,970	
Vissel Kobe	Kobe, Hyōgo	Home's Stadium	30,132	Relegated from J1 League in 2012
Tokushima Vortis	All cities/towns in Tokushima	Pocarisweat Stadium	17,924	
V-Varen Nagasaki	All cities/towns in Nagasaki	Nagasaki Stadium	20,246	Champions of JFL in 2012
Matsumoto Yamaga	Matsumoto, Nagano	Matsumotodaira Park Stadium	20,396	
Yokohama FC	Yokohama, Kanagawa	NHK Spring Mitsuzawa Football Stadium	15,046	

== Foreign Players ==
Club	Player 1	Player 2	Player 3	AFC player	Type-C contract	Non-visa foreign	Former players
Avispa Fukuoka	(Serbia) Bratislav Punoševac	(South Korea) Kim Min-je	(South Korea) Oh Chang-hyun	(South Korea) Park Kun	(South Korea) Jang Jung-won	(South Korea) Kim Yeong-gi	(Brazil) Osmar
Consadole Sapporo	(Brazil) Félix	(Brazil) Paulão	(South Korea) Lee Ho-seung	(Vietnam) Lê Công Vinh	(South Korea) Jo Sung-jin		(Brazil) Tele
Ehime FC	(Brazil) Alair	(Brazil) Osmar	(Croatia) Ante Tomić	(South Korea) Han Hee-hoon			
Fagiano Okayama	(South Korea) Kim Min-kyun				(United States) Piakai Henkel	(South Korea) Go Daimu	(South Korea) Lee Jae-gwan
Gainare Tottori	(Brazil) Eduardo	(United States) Ansger Otto		(South Korea) Im Dong-hyeon			(Brazil) Bruno (Brazil) Rafael Fefo (Brazil) Reginaldo
Gamba Osaka	(Brazil) Adi Rocha	(Brazil) Paulinho		(South Korea) Oh Jae-suk			(Brazil) Leandro
FC Gifu	(Croatia) Stipe Plazibat	(New Zealand) Kayne Vincent	(North Macedonia) Blazhe Ilijoski	(South Korea) Do Dong-hyun		(North Korea) Ri Han-jae	(Brazil) Daniel Lemos (Brazil) Fábio Martins (Italy) Desmond N'Ze
Giravanz Kitakyushu	(South Korea) Ahn Young-kyu	(South Korea) Kim Dong-hee	(South Korea) Nam Il-woo		(South Korea) Lee Keun-ho		
Mito HollyHock	(South Korea) Kim Yong-gi						
JEF United Chiba	(Brazil) Kempes	(South Korea) Kim Hyun-hun		(South Korea) Nam Seung-woo			(Brazil) Jair
Kataller Toyama	(South Korea) Kim Sung-ju	(South Korea) Seo Yong-duk		(South Korea) Yang Hae-joon			
Montedio Yamagata	(South Korea) Kim Byeom-yong	(Uruguay) Álvaro Peña		(South Korea) Lee Tae-ho			
Roasso Kumamoto	(Brazil) Douglas	(Brazil) Fábio Pena	(Brazil) Hugo Almeida	(South Korea) Noh Hyung-goo			(Brazil) Jefferson (Brazil) Pablo
Kyoto Sanga	(Burkina Faso) Wilfried Sanou	(Serbia) Miloš Bajalica		(South Korea) Oh Seung-hoon		(North Korea) Kang Song-ho (South Korea) Hwang Dae-Seong	
Thespakusatsu Gunma	(Brazil) Daniel Lovinho	(Brazil) Eder		(South Korea) Kwon Han-Jin		(North Korea) Hwang Song-su (South Korea) Hwang Dae-Jun	(Brazil) Júnior Alves
Tochigi SC	(Brazil) Cristiano	(Brazil) Paulinho	(Brazil) Sabia	(South Korea) Cha Young-hwan			
Tokyo Verdy				(South Korea) Kim Jong-Pil			(Brazil) Nicollas (South Korea) Bae Dae-won
Tokushima Vortis	(Brazil) Alex	(Brazil) Douglas		(South Korea) Kim Jong-min		(North Korea) Ri Yong-jik	

== League table ==
Pos	Team	Pld	W	D	L	GF	GA	GD	Pts	Promotion or relegation
1	Gamba Osaka (C, P)	42	25	12	5	99	46	+53	87	Promotion to 2014 J.League Division 1
2	Vissel Kobe (P)	42	25	8	9	78	41	+37	83	Promotion to 2014 J.League Division 1
3	Kyoto Sanga	42	20	10	12	68	46	+22	70	Qualification for Promotion Playoffs (Note: Only teams that meet J1 criteria can participate in promotion playoffs. If one or more teams fail to meet the criteria, only eligible teams that finished 3rd to 6th participate and no replacement teams are added.)
4	Tokushima Vortis (O, P)	42	20	7	15	56	51	+5	67	Qualification for Promotion Playoffs
5	JEF United Chiba	42	18	12	12	68	49	+19	66	Qualification for Promotion Playoffs
6	V-Varen Nagasaki	42	19	9	14	48	40	+8	66	Qualification for Promotion Playoffs
7	Matsumoto Yamaga	42	19	9	14	54	54	0	66	
8	Consadole Sapporo	42	20	4	18	60	49	+11	64	
9	Tochigi SC	42	17	12	13	61	55	+6	63	
10	Montedio Yamagata	42	16	11	15	74	61	+13	59	
11	Yokohama FC	42	15	13	14	49	46	+3	58	
12	Fagiano Okayama	42	13	17	12	52	48	+4	56	
13	Tokyo Verdy	42	14	14	14	52	58	−6	56	
14	Avispa Fukuoka	42	15	11	16	47	54	−7	56	
15	Mito HollyHock	42	14	13	15	50	58	−8	55	Ineligible for promotion
16	Giravanz Kitakyushu	42	13	10	19	50	60	−10	49	Ineligible for promotion
17	Ehime FC	42	12	11	19	43	52	−9	47	
18	Kataller Toyama	42	11	11	20	45	59	−14	44	
19	Roasso Kumamoto	42	10	13	19	40	70	−30	43	
20	Thespakusatsu Gunma	42	9	13	20	43	61	−18	40	
21	FC Gifu	42	9	10	23	37	80	−43	37	Ineligible for promotion
22	Gainare Tottori (R)	42	5	16	21	38	74	−36	31	Qualification for Relegation Playoffs (Note: Promotion/relegation play-offs between J2 and JFL tooke place between Kamatamare Sanuki, 2nd-placed club of 2013 Japan Football League with J. League Associate Membership, and 22nd-ranked club of 2013 J2 season.)

Updated to match(es) played on 8 December 2013. Source: J.League Division 2
Rules for classification: 1) points; 2) goal difference; 3) number of goals scored.
(C) Champions; (O) Play-off winners; (P) Promoted; (R) Relegated

== Results ==
Home \ Away	AVI	CON	EHI	FAG	GAI	GAM	GIF	GIR	HOL	JEF	KAT	MON	ROS	SAN	SPA	TOC	VVN	VER	VIS	VOR	YAM	YFC
Avispa Fukuoka		0–1	2–0	2–0	1–1	2–3	2–1	2–1	1–1	3–4	1–4	2–1	1–1	1–2	1–0	2–0	2–1	2–3	0–0	1–0	0–1	1–5
Consadole Sapporo	3–0		3–0	2–2	3–0	1–3	4–0	0–0	0–1	1–0	1–0	3–1	1–3	0–1	1–3	0–1	1–0	1–1	1–0	2–1	1–2	2–0
Ehime FC	2–2	3–2		0–1	1–0	1–2	0–0	3–0	2–2	0–1	0–0	3–1	1–1	2–0	2–0	3–0	0–2	4–0	2–4	0–2	1–1	0–1
Fagiano Okayama	1–1	3–2	1–1		2–0	2–3	1–2	0–0	1–1	3–0	1–3	4–3	2–3	1–1	2–0	1–3	1–1	2–0	1–0	2–0	2–1	0–0
Gainare Tottori	0–0	0–2	1–1	0–0		1–7	3–4	2–3	3–1	2–2	2–3	0–6	0–0	0–1	1–1	1–1	0–3	1–1	1–2	0–1	1–0	0–0
Gamba Osaka	1–0	3–0	0–1	1–1	1–1		2–0	1–1	5–0	1–1	3–1	3–2	4–0	3–3	5–1	3–0	1–2	0–0	3–2	2–0	1–0	0–0
FC Gifu	0–2	0–3	1–1	0–0	2–1	2–8		3–1	1–4	0–1	2–3	1–1	0–0	0–3	0–0	0–1	2–1	1–2	1–0	0–1	1–2	0–2
Giravanz Kitakyushu	0–2	1–2	1–0	2–1	2–1	0–1	2–0		0–2	1–0	1–2	1–2	7–0	1–1	3–2	0–2	1–2	1–1	2–3	0–2	1–2	1–1
Mito HollyHock	0–0	1–3	0–1	1–0	2–2	0–2	4–1	2–2		2–0	1–0	1–3	1–1	2–1	1–1	4–3	0–0	1–0	0–2	0–0	1–2	2–2
JEF United Chiba	1–1	0–1	2–0	0–0	1–1	3–0	1–1	6–1	2–0		3–2	1–3	6–0	1–2	2–2	1–1	0–2	2–1	2–1	1–2	1–0	1–1
Kataller Toyama	1–2	3–1	1–0	0–0	1–1	0–4	1–2	0–0	2–1	1–2		1–3	1–2	1–0	0–0	1–2	1–1	1–1	0–0	2–1	0–1	0–1
Montedio Yamagata	2–1	0–1	3–0	1–2	2–3	0–1	2–2	0–1	2–1	0–3	3–1		1–0	1–2	1–1	2–1	2–0	0–0	3–2	2–2	4–1	5–1
Roasso Kumamoto	1–1	2–1	0–1	1–1	1–2	2–2	1–1	1–2	3–2	0–3	1–1	1–1		1–3	2–3	1–4	1–0	2–1	1–2	0–1	0–3	0–1
Kyoto Sanga	2–1	2–0	4–1	2–4	3–0	0–2	2–0	1–2	0–1	3–3	3–2	1–1	2–0		2–1	1–2	2–0	0–0	4–1	1–2	0–1	0–1
Thespakusatsu Gunma	0–1	2–0	2–1	2–1	0–0	1–1	0–1	0–0	0–1	0–2	1–1	2–2	1–0	2–3		0–1	1–2	0–1	2–2	4–1	3–0	1–0
Tochigi SC	2–0	4–3	0–1	1–0	1–1	4–2	2–0	3–2	0–1	0–0	1–1	1–1	0–1	2–2	3–0		2–2	4–2	2–2	0–1	0–1	0–0
V-Varen Nagasaki	0–0	0–0	1–1	1–1	3–1	1–3	3–0	1–0	0–2	2–1	1–0	2–1	1–0	0–1	1–0	2–0		2–1	0–2	0–1	0–1	2–0
Tokyo Verdy	0–1	2–1	2–1	1–1	3–0	3–3	3–0	1–0	0–0	1–0	1–2	2–0	1–1	0–5	2–1	3–3	2–1		2–1	1–1	1–3	1–3
Vissel Kobe	4–0	1–0	2–0	3–3	0–1	2–0	4–0	2–1	1–1	2–2	1–0	1–0	3–0	0–0	4–1	2–0	2–0	2–1		3–2	7–0	1–0
Tokushima Vortis	2–1	1–0	3–2	2–0	2–1	1–5	3–1	1–2	3–1	1–2	2–0	2–2	0–3	1–1	4–1	0–1	1–2	2–1	0–1		2–0	0–1
Matsumoto Yamaga	2–1	2–4	1–0	1–0	2–1	2–2	1–2	1–1	2–0	3–2	3–0	2–3	1–2	1–1	1–1	2–2	1–1	0–0	1–2	0–0		0–1
Yokohama FC	0–1	0–2	0–0	0–1	2–1	2–2	2–2	1–2	4–1	1–2	2–1	1–1	0–0	1–0	2–0	3–1	1–2	2–3	1–2	2–2	1–3	

Updated to match(es) played on 24 November 2013. Source: J. League Division 2
Legend: Blue = home team win; Yellow = draw; Red = away team win.

== Play-offs ==
=== Promotion Playoffs to Division 1 ===
2013 J.League Road To J1 play-offs (2013 J1昇格プレーオフ)
Teams that finished 3rd to 6th participate in play-off series for the last J1 promotion berth.

Semifinals
3	Kyoto Sanga	0
6	V-Varen Nagasaki	0
4	Tokushima Vortis	1
5	JEF United Chiba	1

Final
3	Kyoto Sanga	0
4	Tokushima Vortis	2

==== Semifinals ====
1 December 2013
14:04

Kyoto Sanga	0–0	V-Varen Nagasaki
	Report

Nishikyogoku Athletic Stadium, Ukyō-ku, Kyoto
Attendance: 12,387
Referee: Ryuji Sato

1 December 2013
14:04

Tokushima Vortis	1–1	JEF United Chiba
Douglas 37'	Report	40' Yamaguchi

Pocarisweat Stadium, Naruto, Tokushima
Attendance: 9,301
Referee: Toshimitsu Yoshida

If the score was tied after 90 minutes, no extra time was played and the winner was the team with the best league ranking.

==== Final ====
8 December 2013
15:30

Kyoto Sanga	0–2	Tokushima Vortis
	Report	Chiyotanda 39'; Tsuda 43'

National Olympic Stadium, Shinjuku, Tokyo
Attendance: 23,266
Referee: Nobutsugu Murakami

Tokushima Vortis were promoted to 2014 J.League Division 1

=== JFL Relegation Playoffs ===
2013 J2/JFL play-offs (2013 J2・JFL入れ替え戦)
The last-placed Gainare Tottori faced 2013 Japan Football League runners-up Kamatamare Sanuki in a two-legged playoff series.

Team 1	Agg.	Team 2	1st leg	2nd leg
Gainare Tottori	1–2	Kamatamare Sanuki	1–1	0–1

1 December 2013
13:03

Kamatamare Sanuki	1–1	Gainare Tottori
Takahashi 47'	Report	50' Mori

Kagawa Marugame Stadium, Marugame, Kagawa
Attendance: 5,793
Referee: Yosuke Kubota

8 December 2013
13:00

Gainare Tottori	0–1	Kamatamare Sanuki
	Report	Takahashi 20'

Tottori Bank Bird Stadium, Tottori
Attendance: 6,313
Referee: Koichiro Fukushima

Gainare Tottori was relegated to 2014 J3 League
Kamatamare Sanuki was promoted to 2014 J.League Division 2

== Top scorers ==
Rank	Scorer	Club	Goals
1	(Brazil) Kempes	JEF United Chiba	22
2	(Japan) Takashi Usami	Gamba Osaka	19
3	(Japan) Yoshihiro Uchimura	Consadole Sapporo	17
4	(Brazil) Cristiano	Tochigi SC	16
4	(Japan) Keijiro Ogawa	Vissel Kobe	16
4	(Brazil) Popó	Vissel Kobe	16
4	(Brazil) Sabiá	Tochigi SC	16
8	(Japan) Tomohiro Tsuda	Tokushima Vortis	14
9	(Japan) Ryuichi Hirashige	Thespakusatsu Gunma	13
9	(Brazil) Leandro	Gamba Osaka	13

Updated to games played on 24 November 2013
Source: J. League

== Awards ==
=== Player of the Month ===
Month	Player	Club
March	(Brazil) Popó	Vissel Kobe
April	(Brazil) Leandro	Gamba Osaka
May	(South Korea) Oh Seung-Hoon	Kyoto Sanga
June	(Japan) Ryohei Hayashi	Montedio Yamagata
July	(Japan) Koji Yamase	Kyoto Sanga
August	(Japan) Takashi Usami	Gamba Osaka
September	(Japan) Keijiro Ogawa	Vissel Kobe
October	(Brazil) Kempes	JEF United Chiba
November		

== Attendances ==
Pos	Team	Total	High	Low	Average	Change
1	Gamba Osaka	257,996	18,041	8,045	12,286	−16.9%^{†}
2	Vissel Kobe	241,841	23,012	4,151	11,516	−21.3%^{†}
3	Matsumoto Yamaga	231,866	17,148	7,153	11,041	+15.8%
4	Consadole Sapporo	211,568	24,813	4,837	10,075	−16.1%^{†}
5	JEF United Chiba	210,078	15,982	6,511	10,004	+7.8%
6	Fagiano Okayama	180,056	18,269	6,234	8,574	+7.4%
7	Kyoto Sanga	165,717	15,380	4,314	7,891	+8.5%
8	Montedio Yamagata	147,416	17,223	4,433	7,020	−4.6%
9	Tokyo Verdy	133,201	18,705	2,539	6,343	+18.8%
10	Roasso Kumamoto	130,769	12,003	3,339	6,227	+6.4%
11	V-Varen Nagasaki	129,517	18,153	2,093	6,167	+68.7%^{‡}
12	Yokohama FC	127,354	12,490	2,139	6,064	+0.4%
13	Avispa Fukuoka	120,270	14,526	2,640	5,727	+2.5%
14	Tochigi SC	103,360	10,687	2,103	4,922	+27.8%
15	Mito HollyHock	97,237	10,025	2,513	4,630	+16.5%
16	FC Gifu	95,032	11,719	2,341	4,525	+6.0%
17	Kataller Toyama	93,960	13,639	2,315	4,474	+34.6%
18	Tokushima Vortis	91,303	8,897	1,875	4,348	+8.9%
19	Gainare Tottori	86,033	10,096	1,530	4,097	+30.8%
20	Ehime FC	82,952	10,381	1,104	3,950	+8.8%
21	Thespakusatsu Gunma	74,990	7,810	1,472	3,571	+6.9%
22	Giravanz Kitakyushu	66,665	7,207	1,607	3,175	−5.1%
	League total	3,079,181	23,012	1,104	6,665	+14.8%

Updated to games played on 24 November 2013
Source: J. League Division 2
Notes:
^{†} Team played previous season in J1.
^{‡} Team played previous season in JFL.
