= 2016 Japanese Super Cup =

Sanfrecce Hiroshima	Gamba Osaka
3	1
- Date: 20 February 2016
- Venue: Nissan Stadium, Yokohama
- Referee: Jumpei Iida
- Attendance: 33,805
- Weather: Rain / 12.9°C / 68% humidity

The 2016 Japanese Super Cup was held on 20 February 2016 between the 2015 J.League champions Sanfrecce Hiroshima and the 2015 Emperor's Cup winners Gamba Osaka. Between them these two sides had won the Super Cup for the past 3 seasons and in this match it was Sanfrecce who triumphed 3–1 to lift the title for the fourth time in their history following successes in 2008, 2013 and 2014. For Gamba, this game marked their fourth loss in six Super Cup appearances, with wins in 2007 and 2015 being offset by defeats in 2006, 2009, 2010 and now this year.

As for the game itself, after a goalless first half it was Sanfrecce who took the lead 7 minutes into the second through the experienced Hisato Satō. Pacy forward Takuma Asano made it 2–0 from the penalty spot 5 minutes later, however Gamba's leading scorer for the past 3 seasons, Takashi Usami, opened his account for the 2016 campaign in the 68th minute to give his side a foothold in the contest. That did not last long and Sanfrecce's new Nigerian signing Peter Utaka wrapped the match up for the men from Hiroshima with 17 minutes remaining.

== Match ==
20 February 2016
13:35 JST

Sanfrecce Hiroshima	3–1	Gamba Osaka
Satō 51'; Asano 57'; Utaka 73'	Summary	Usami 68'

Nissan Stadium, Yokohama
Attendance: 33,805
Referee: Jumpei Iida

Sanfrecce Hiroshima
GK	1	(Japan) Takuto Hayashi
CB	19	(Japan) Sho Sasaki	(yellow card) 38'
CB	5	(Japan) Kazuhiko Chiba
CB	4	(Japan) Tsukasa Shiotani
DM	8	(Japan) Kazuyuki Morisaki
DM	6	(Japan) Toshihiro Aoyama (c)		(substituted off) 83'
RM	7	(Croatia) Mihael Mikić
LM	18	(Japan) Yoshifumi Kashiwa
AM	25	(Japan) Yusuke Chajima
AM	30	(Japan) Kosei Shibasaki		(substituted off) 69'
CF	11	(Japan) Hisato Satō		(substituted off) 53'
Substitutes:
GK	21	(Japan) Ryotaro Hironaga
CB	4	(Japan) Hiroki Mizumoto
CB	37	(Japan) Kazuya Miyahara
DM	28	(Japan) Takuya Marutani		(substituted on) 83'
LM	16	(Japan) Kohei Shimizu
CF	9	(Nigeria) Peter Utaka	(yellow card) 88'	(substituted on) 69'
CF	10	(Japan) Takuma Asano		(substituted on) 53'
Manager:
(Japan) Hajime Moriyasu

Gamba Osaka
GK	1	(Japan) Masaaki Higashiguchi
RB	22	(South Korea) Oh Jae-suk
CB	5	(Japan) Daiki Niwa	(yellow card) 55'
CB	15	(Japan) Yasuyuki Konno
LB	4	(Japan) Hiroki Fujiharu
DM	21	(Japan) Yosuke Ideguchi	(yellow card) 45+1'
DM	7	(Japan) Yasuhito Endō (c)
RW	13	(Japan) Hiroyuki Abe		(substituted off) 76'
LW	39	(Japan) Takashi Usami
AM	9	(Brazil) Ademilson		(substituted off) 60'
CF	29	(Brazil) Patric		(substituted off) 60'
Substitutes:
GK	18	(Japan) Yōsuke Fujigaya
RB	35	(Japan) Ryo Hatsuse
CB	6	(South Korea) Kim Jung-ya
DM	27	(Japan) Tatsuya Uchida
RW	25	(Japan) Jungo Fujimoto		(substituted on) 76'
AM	11	(Japan) Shu Kurata		(substituted on) 60'
CF	20	(Japan) Shun Nagasawa		(substituted on) 60'
Manager:
(Japan) Kenta Hasegawa

=== Statistics ===
Statistic	Sanfrecce Hiroshima	Gamba Osaka
Goals scored	3	1
Possession	58%	42%
Shots on target	4	4
Shots off target	4	3
Corner kicks	6	2
Fouls	7	13
Offsides	1	3
Yellow cards	2	2
Red cards	0	0
Source: Match Statistics
