= Yuki Yamamura =

Japanese footballer

Yuki Yamamura 山村佑樹
Personal information
- Full name: Yuki Yamamura
- Date of birth: August 1, 1990 (age 36)
- Place of birth: Kanagawa, Japan
- Height: 1.69 m (5 ft 7 in)
- Position: Forward

Team information
- Current team: Tochigi Uva FC
- Number: 9

Youth career
- 2003–2008: FC Tokyo Youth
- 2009–2012: Meiji University

Senior career*
Years	Team	Apps	(Gls)
2012–2017	Mito HollyHock	102	(11)
2018–	Tochigi Uva FC		
- * Club domestic league appearances and goals as of 23 February 2016

Yuki Yamamura (山村 佑樹, Yamamura Yūki; born August 1, 1990) is a Japanese football player who currently plays for Tochigi City FC.

== Club statistics ==
Updated to 23 February 2018.

Club performance			League		Cup		Total	
Season	Club	League	Apps	Goals	Apps	Goals	Apps	Goals
Japan			League		Emperor's Cup		Total	
2012	Mito HollyHock	J2 League	5	1	-		5	1
2013	Mito HollyHock	J2 League	36	4	2	0	38	4
2014	Mito HollyHock	J2 League	10	2	0	0	10	2
2015	Mito HollyHock	J2 League	30	1	3	0	33	1
2016	Mito HollyHock	J2 League	16	2	2	1	18	3
2017	Mito HollyHock	J2 League	5	1	1	0	6	1
Total			102	11	8	1	110	12
