= Douglas (footballer, born December 1983) =

Brazilian footballer

Personal information
- Full name: Douglas David Fernandes
- Date of birth: December 13, 1983 (age 42)
- Place of birth: Brazil
- Height: 1.73 m (5 ft 8 in)
- Position: Midfielder

Senior career*
Years	Team	Apps	(Gls)
2013	Roasso Kumamoto	9	(0)
- * Club domestic league appearances and goals as of December 31, 2013

Douglas David Fernandes (born December 13, 1983), known as just Douglas, is a Brazilian football player.

== Playing career ==
Douglas played for J2 League club; Roasso Kumamoto in 2013 season.

== Club statistics ==
Club performance			League		League Cup		Total	
Season	Club	League	Apps	Goals	Apps	Goals	Apps	Goals
Japan			League		J.League Cup		Total	
2013	Roasso Kumamoto	J2 League	9	0	-		9	0
Career total			9	0	0	0	9	0
