= Ryo Nishiguchi =

Japanese footballer (born 1990)

Ryo Nishiguchi 西口 諒
Personal information
- Full name: Ryo Nishiguchi
- Date of birth: November 4, 1990 (age 35)
- Place of birth: Shiga, Japan
- Height: 1.81 m (5 ft 11 1/2 in)
- Position: Defender

Team information
- Current team: MIO Biwako Shiga
- Number: 29

Youth career
- 2009–2012: Kyoto Sangyo University

Senior career*
| Years | Team | Apps | (Gls) |
| 2013–2019 | Nagano Parceiro | 115 | (6) |
| 2019 | → MIO Biwako Shiga | 15 | (0) |
| 2020– | MIO Biwako Shiga | | |
- * Club domestic league appearances and goals as of 23 February 2020

Ryo Nishiguchi (西口 諒, Nishiguchi Ryō; born November 4, 1990) is a Japanese football player.

== Club statistics ==
Updated to 23 February 2020.

| Club performance | | | League | | Cup | | Total | |
| Season | Club | League | Apps | Goals | Apps | Goals | Apps | Goals |
| Japan | | | League | | Emperor's Cup | | Total | |
|---|---|---|---|---|---|---|---|---|
| 2013 | Nagano Parceiro | JFL | 31 | 1 | 4 | 1 | 35 | 2 |
| 2014 | Nagano Parceiro | J3 League | 32 | 1 | 2 | 0 | 34 | 1 |
| 2015 | Nagano Parceiro | J3 League | 20 | 3 | 0 | 0 | 20 | 3 |
| 2016 | Nagano Parceiro | J3 League | 11 | 0 | 3 | 1 | 14 | 1 |
| 2017 | Nagano Parceiro | J3 League | 13 | 1 | 2 | 0 | 15 | 1 |
| 2018 | Nagano Parceiro | J3 League | 8 | 0 | 0 | 0 | 8 | 0 |
| 2019 | Nagano Parceiro | J3 League | 0 | 0 | 0 | 0 | 0 | 0 |
| 2019 | MIO Biwako Shiga | JFL | 15 | 0 | – | | 15 | 0 |
| Total | | | 130 | 6 | 11 | 2 | 141 | 8 |
