= Yang Hae-joon =

South Korean footballer

Yang Hae-Joon
Personal information
- Full name: Yang Hae-Joon
- Date of birth: 4 October 1990 (age 36)
- Place of birth: South Korea
- Height: 1.78 m (5 ft 10 in)
- Position: Defender

Senior career*
Years	Team	Apps	(Gls)
2013–2014	Kataller Toyama	5	(0)
- * Club domestic league appearances and goals as of 29 January 2014

Yang Hae-Joon (Korean: 양해준; born 4 October 1990) is a South Korean football player.

== Club statistics ==
Club performance			League		Cup		League Cup		Total	
Season	Club	League	Apps	Goals	Apps	Goals	Apps	Goals	Apps	Goals
Japan			League		Emperor's Cup		League Cup		Total	
2013	Kataller Toyama	J2 League	5	0	1	0	-	-	6	0
2014	Kataller Toyama	J2 League					-	-		
Country	Japan		5	0	1	0	-	-	6	0
Total			5	0	1	0	-	-	6	0
