= Yuta Tsunami =

Japanese footballer

Yuta Tsunami 都並 優太
Personal information
- Full name: Yuta Tsunami
- Date of birth: 20 January 1992 (age 34)
- Place of birth: Tokyo, Japan
- Height: 1.72 m (5 ft 7 1/2 in)
- Position: Defender

Team information
- Current team: Nara Club
- Number: 13

Youth career
- –2003: Tokyo BIG SC
- 2004–2009: Tokyo Verdy 1969

College career
Years	Team	Apps	(Gls)
2010–2013	Kansai University		

Senior career*
Years	Team	Apps	(Gls)
2014–2018	Nagano Parceiro	51	(2)
2019–	Nara Club	121	(7)
- * Club domestic league appearances and goals as of 1 January 2026

Yuta Tsunami (都並 優太, Tsunami Yuta; born January 20, 1992 in Tokyo) is a Japanese football player who play as a Defender and currently play for J3 club, Nara Club.

== Career ==
Tsunami starting from youth team, Tokyo BIG SC until 2003. Later, he joined to Tokyo Verdy 1969 Youth Team upon entering junior high school. In his second year of high school, he switched from midfielder to left back, just like his father. Unable to advance to the top team from Verdy Youth, he went on to Kansai University. In his fourth year, he led the team as captain.

On 17 January 2014, Tsunami joined AC Nagano Parceiro on an amateur contract. He later switched to a professional contract and remained with the club until the 2018 season.

On 28 November 2018, Tsunami announcement leave the club after four years at Nagano Parceiro.

On 9 January 2019, Tsunami joined to JFL club, Nara Club.

== Personal life ==
His father is Satoshi Tsunami and currently manager of Briobecca Urayasu.

== Career statistics ==
=== Club ===
As of the end 2024 season.

Club performance			League		Cup		League Cup		Total	
Season	Club	League	Apps	Goals	Apps	Goals	Apps	Goals	Apps	Goals
Japan			League		Emperor's Cup		J. League Cup		Total	
2014	Nagano Parceiro	J3 League	0	0	0	0	–	–	0	0
2015	Nagano Parceiro	J3 League	28	1	1	0	–	–	29	1
2016	Nagano Parceiro	J3 League	0	0	2	0	–	–	2	0
2017	Nagano Parceiro	J3 League	15	1	2	0	–	–	17	1
2018	Nagano Parceiro	J3 League	8	0	2	0	–	–	10	0
2019	Nara Club	JFL	6	1	–		–	–	6	1
2020	Nara Club	JFL	12	1	1	0	–	–	13	1
2021	Nara Club	JFL	19	3	–		–	–	19	3
2022	Nara Club	JFL	25	1	1	0	–	–	26	1
2023	Nara Club	J3 League	25	0	1	0	–	–	26	0
2024	Nara Club	J3 League	20	0	1	0	1	0	22	0
Career total			158	8	11	0	1	0	170	8

== Honours ==
Nara Club

- Japan Football League: 2022
