= Yusuke Chajima =

Japanese footballer (born 1991)

Yusuke Chajima 茶島雄介
Personal information
- Full name: Yusuke Chajima
- Date of birth: July 20, 1991 (age 35)
- Place of birth: Aki-ku, Hiroshima, Japan
- Height: 1.66 m (5 ft 5 in)
- Positions: Right winger; right back

Youth career
- 2000–2009: Sanfrecce Hiroshima

College career
Years	Team	Apps	(Gls)
2010–2013	Tokyo Gakugei University		

Senior career*
Years	Team	Apps	(Gls)
2014–2026	Sanfrecce Hiroshima	109	(6)
2018–2019	→ JEF United Chiba (loan)	61	(4)
Total		170	(10)
Medal record
Sanfrecce Hiroshima
Winner	J1 League	2015
Runner-up	J.League Cup	2014
- * Club domestic league appearances and goals as of 13 September 2025

Yusuke Chajima (茶島雄介, Chajima Yūsuke; born July 20, 1991 in Aki-ku, Hiroshima) is a Japanese former footballer who played as a right winger or right back, most notably for Sanfrecce Hiroshima. He announced his retirement in June 2026.

== Career statistics ==
Appearances and goals by club, season and competition
Club	Season	League			National cup (Note: Includes Emperor's Cup)		League cup (Note: Includes J.League Cup)		Continental		Other		Total	
Club	Season	Division	Apps	Goals	Apps	Goals	Apps	Goals	Apps	Goals	Apps	Goals	Apps	Goals
Sanfrecce Hiroshima	2014	J.League Division 1	1	0	3	0	1	0	0	0	0	0	5	0
Sanfrecce Hiroshima	2015	J1 League	3	0	4	0	5	0	0	0	3 (Note: Appearance in FIFA Club World Cup)	0	15	0
Sanfrecce Hiroshima	2016	J1 League	22	3	0	0	1	0	2 (Note: Appearances in AFC Champions League)	0	1 (Note: Appearance in Japanese Super Cup)	0	26	3
Sanfrecce Hiroshima	2017	J1 League	12	0	3	0	5	1	0	0	0	0	20	1
Sanfrecce Hiroshima	2020	J1 League	29	0	0	0	1	0	0	0	0	0	30	0
Sanfrecce Hiroshima	2021	J1 League	21	0	1	0	6	0	0	0	0	0	28	0
Sanfrecce Hiroshima	2022	J1 League	7	1	4	0	8	0	0	0	0	0	19	1
Sanfrecce Hiroshima	2023	J1 League	7	2	1	0	0	0	0	0	0	0	8	2
Sanfrecce Hiroshima	2024	J1 League	2	0	3	0	0	0	4 (Note: Appearances in AFC Champions League Two)	0	0	0	9	0
Sanfrecce Hiroshima	2025	J1 League	1	0	0	0	1	0	0	0	0	0	2	0
Sanfrecce Hiroshima	2026	J1 (100)	4	0	–		–		0	0	0	0	4	0
Sanfrecce Hiroshima	Total		109	6	19	0	28	1	6	0	4	0	166	7
JEF United Chiba (loan)	2018	J2 League	39	3	1	0	–		–		–		40	3
JEF United Chiba (loan)	2019	J2 League	22	1	0	0	–		–		–		22	1
JEF United Chiba (loan)	Total		61	4	1	0	0	0	0	0	0	0	62	4
Career total			170	10	20	0	28	1	6	0	4	0	228	11

== Honours ==
- J1 League
  - Champions (1): 2015
- J1 League Second stage
  - Champions (1): 2015
- J.League Cup
  - Champions (1): 2022
- Japanese Super Cup:
  - Winners (2): 2014, 2016
