= Tele (footballer) =

Brazilian footballer (born 1990)

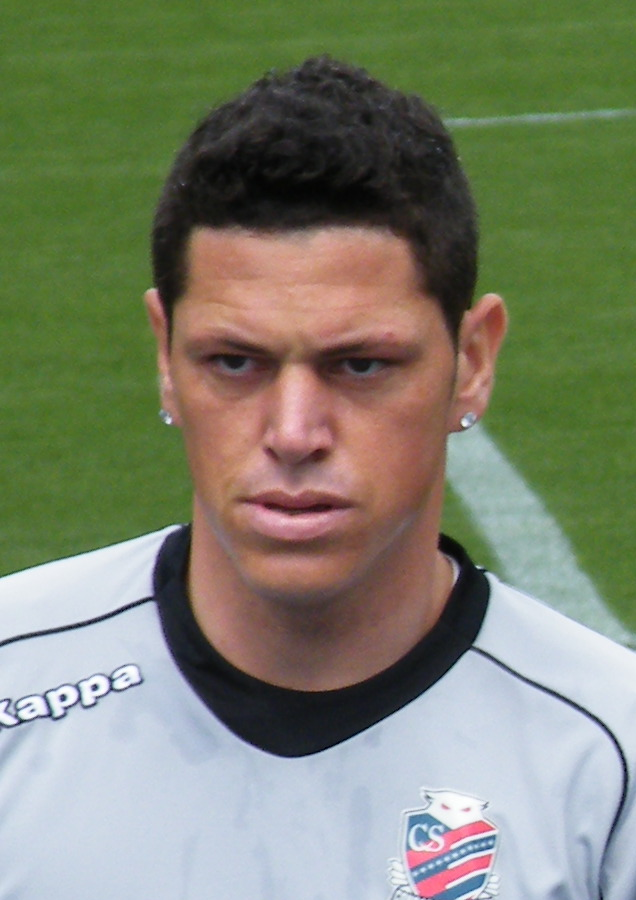
- Tele with Consadole Sapporo in 2013

Personal information
- Full name: Marcio Alves dos Santos
- Date of birth: 2 February 1990 (age 36)
- Place of birth: Dom Pedrito, Brazil
- Height: 1.86 m (6 ft 1 in)
- Position: Forward

Team information
- Current team: Sông Lam Nghệ An
- Number: 19

Senior career*
Years	Team	Apps	(Gls)
2011	Juventude	0	(0)
2012	Canoas	4	(0)
2012–2013	Consadole Sapporo	10	(0)
2013	FC Machida Zelvia	6	(0)
2019–	Sông Lam Nghệ An	5	(0)
- * Club domestic league appearances and goals

Marcio Alves dos Santos (born 2 February 1990), known as Tele, is a Brazilian footballer.

== Club statistics ==
Club performance			League		Cup		League Cup		Total	
Season	Club	League	Apps	Goals	Apps	Goals	Apps	Goals	Apps	Goals
Japan			League		Emperor's Cup		J.League Cup		Total	
2012	Consadole Sapporo	J1 League	5	0					5	0
Country	Japan									
Total										
