= Takeshi Handa =

Japanese footballer

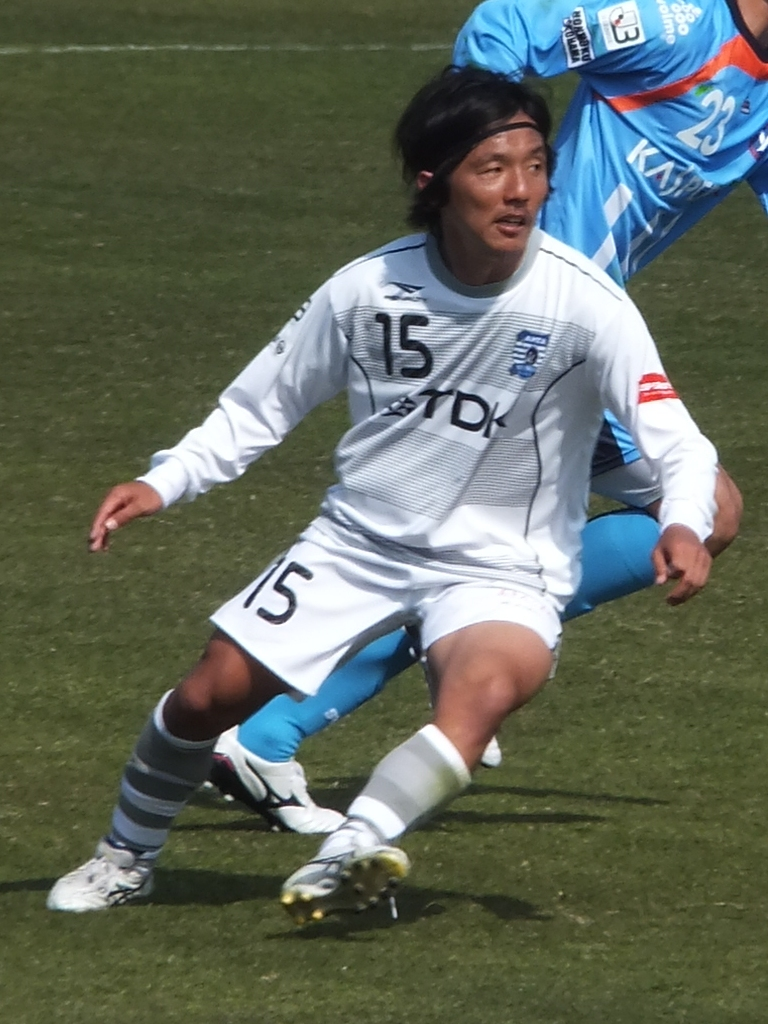

Personal information
- Full name: Takeshi Handa
- Date of birth: June 26, 1985 (age 41)
- Place of birth: Fukuoka, Japan
- Height: 1.68 m (5 ft 6 in)
- Position: Midfielder

Youth career
- JEF United Chiba
- Kokushikan University

Senior career*
Years	Team	Apps	(Gls)
2009–2010	FC Machida Zelvia	18	(1)
2011–2012	MIO Biwako Shiga	62	(13)
2013–2015	Blaublitz Akita	69	(9)
Total		149	(23)
- * Club domestic league appearances and goals

Takeshi Handa (半田 武嗣, Handa Takeshi; born June 26, 1985) is a former Japanese football player.

== Playing career ==
Takeshi Handa played for FC Machida Zelvia, MIO Biwako Shiga and Blaublitz Akita from 2009 to 2015.
