= Kohei Fujita =

Japanese footballer (born 1989)

Personal information
- Full name: Kohei Fujita
- Date of birth: 19 June 1989 (age 37)
- Place of birth: Hyōgo, Japan
- Height: 1.76 m (5 ft 9 in)
- Position: Midfielder

Team information
- Current team: Suzuka Unlimited FC
- Number: 6

Youth career
- 2005–2007: St. Michael's Senior High School
- 2008–2011: Ritsumeikan University

Senior career*
Years	Team	Apps	(Gls)
2012–2016	Kamatamare Sanuki	58	(1)
2017–	Suzuka Unlimited FC		
- * Club domestic league appearances and goals as of 23 February 2017

Kohei Fujita (藤田浩平, Fujita, Kohei; born 19 June 1989 in Hyōgo) is a Japanese footballer who plays for Suzuka Unlimited FC.

== Club statistics ==
Updated to 23 February 2017.

Club performance			League		Cup		Total	
Season	Club	League	Apps	Goals	Apps	Goals	Apps	Goals
Japan			League		Emperor's Cup		Total	
2012	Kamatamare Sanuki	JFL	17	1	1	1	18	2
2013	Kamatamare Sanuki	JFL	4	0	1	1	5	1
2014	Kamatamare Sanuki	J2 League	11	0	1	0	12	0
2015	Kamatamare Sanuki	J2 League	19	0	1	0	20	0
2016	Kamatamare Sanuki	J2 League	7	0	1	0	8	0
Career total			58	1	5	2	63	3
