= Yoshihito Fujita =

Japanese footballer (born 1983)

Yoshihito Fujita 藤田 祥史
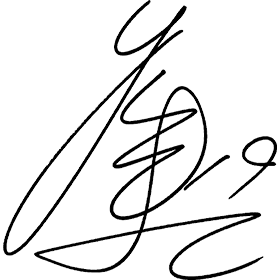
- Autograph in 2014

Personal information
- Full name: Yoshihito Fujita
- Date of birth: 13 April 1983 (age 43)
- Place of birth: Kobe, Hyogo, Japan
- Height: 1.85 m (6 ft 1 in)
- Position: Striker

Team information
- Current team: Cento Cuore Harima FC
- Number: 11

Youth career
- 1996–1998: Vissel Kobe Junior Youth
- 1999–2001: Kobe Kokusai High School
- 2002–2005: Ritsumeikan University

Senior career*
Years	Team	Apps	(Gls)
2006–2008	Sagan Tosu	105	(46)
2009–2010	Omiya Ardija	34	(5)
2011	Yokohama FC	31	(3)
2012	JEF United Chiba	38	(17)
2013–2014	Yokohama F. Marinos	50	(4)
2015–2017	Shonan Bellmare	40	(5)
2018	Blaublitz Akita	25	(4)
2019-2020	Tochigi City FC	20	(12)
2021-	Cento Cuore Harima FC		
Medal record
Yokohama F. Marinos
Runner-up	J1 League	2013
Winner	Emperor's Cup	2013
- * Club domestic league appearances and goals as of 23 February 2018

Yoshihito Fujita (藤田 祥史, Fujita Yoshihito; born 13 April 1983) is a Japanese footballer who plays for Japanese club Cento Cuore Harima FC.

== Career statistics ==
Updated to 23 February 2018.

Appearances and goals by club, season and competition
Club	Season	League			Emperor's Cup		J.League Cup		Continental		Total	
Club	Season	Division	Apps	Goals	Apps	Goals	Apps	Goals	Apps	Goals	Apps	Goals
Sagan Tosu	2006	J2 League	23	4	2	1	-		-		25	5
Sagan Tosu	2007	J2 League	44	24	2	0	-		-		46	24
Sagan Tosu	2008	J2 League	38	18	4	2	-		-		42	20
Omiya Ardija	2009	J1 League	27	4	1	0	6	1	-		34	5
Omiya Ardija	2010	J1 League	7	1	3	1	6	1	-		16	3
Yokohama FC	2011	J2 League	31	3	0	0	-		-		31	3
JEF United Chiba	2012	J2 League	36	15	2	1	-		-		38	16
Yokohama F. Marinos	2013	J1 League	32	2	5	4	10	1	-		47	7
Yokohama F. Marinos	2014	J1 League	18	2	2	0	1	0	2	0	21	0
Shonan Bellmare	2015	J1 League	17	4	2	2	0	0	-		19	6
Shonan Bellmare	2016	J1 League	12	1	2	2	5	0	-		19	3
Shonan Bellmare	2017	J2 League	11	0	1	1	-		-		12	1
Career total			222	59	23	13	22	2	2	0	267	93
