= Han Hee-hoon =

South Korean footballer (born 1990)

Personal information
- Full name: Han Hee-hoon
- Date of birth: 10 August 1990 (age 36)
- Place of birth: South Korea
- Height: 1.83 m (6 ft 0 in)
- Position: Defender

Team information
- Current team: Daegu FC II
- Number: 90

Youth career
- 2013–2014: Sangji University

Senior career*
Years	Team	Apps	(Gls)
2013–2014	Ehime FC	34	(2)
2015	Tochigi SC	31	(1)
2016	Bucheon FC	39	(2)
2017–2019	Daegu FC	87	(1)
2020–2022	Gwangju FC	27	(1)
2022–2023	Busan IPark	3	(0)
2024–	Daegu FC II	0	(0)
- * Club domestic league appearances and goals as of 30 August 2022

- Han Hee-hoon
- Hangul: 한희훈
- Hanja: 韓熙訓
- RR: Han Huihun
- MR: Han Hŭihun

Han Hee-hoon (Korean: 한희훈; born 10 August 1990) is a South Korean footballer who plays as a defender for Daegu FC II.

== Honors and awards ==
=== Player ===
Daegu FC

- Korean FA Cup Winners (1) : 2018
