= Eder (footballer, born 1984) =

Brazilian footballer

Personal information
- Full name: Ederson Trindade Lopes
- Date of birth: December 31, 1984 (age 41)
- Place of birth: São Paulo
- Height: 1.88 m (6 ft 2 in)
- Position: Forward

Senior career*
Years	Team	Apps	(Gls)
2012	Clube Atlético Taboão da Serra	?	(?)
2013–2014	Thespakusatsu Gunma	32	(7)
- * Club domestic league appearances and goals as of 1 December 2014

Ederson Trindade Lopes or simply Eder (born December 31, 1984) is a Brazilian football player.
