= Kazuki Arinaga =

Japanese footballer

Kazuki Arinaga 有永一生
Personal information
- Full name: Kazuki Arinaga
- Date of birth: March 3, 1989 (age 37)
- Place of birth: Nagasaki, Japan
- Height: 1.75 m (5 ft 9 in)
- Position: Defender

Team information
- Current team: Iwate Grulla Morioka
- Number: 25

Youth career
- 2004–2006: Kunimi High School
- 2007–2010: Kanto Gakuin University

Senior career*
Years	Team	Apps	(Gls)
2011–2019	Nagano Parceiro	240	(20)
2020–	Iwate Grulla Morioka		
- * Club domestic league appearances and goals as of 23 February 2020

Kazuki Arinaga (有永一生, Arinaga, Kazuki; March 3, 1989) is a Japanese football player, who plays for Iwate Grulla Morioka as a defender.

== Career ==
After four years at Kanto Gakuin University, he joined Nagano Parceiro in January 2011.

== Club statistics ==
Updated to 23 February 2020.

Club performance			League		Cup		Other^{[1]}		Total	
Season	Club	League	Apps	Goals	Apps	Goals	Apps	Goals	Apps	Goals
Japan			League		Emperor's Cup		Other		Total	
2011	Nagano Parceiro	JFL	15	1	–		–		15	1
2012	Nagano Parceiro	JFL	11	1	1	0	–		12	1
2013	Nagano Parceiro	JFL	34	3	4	2	–		38	5
2014	Nagano Parceiro	J3 League	32	2	1	0	2	0	35	2
2015	Nagano Parceiro	J3 League	36	4	1	0	–		37	4
2016	Nagano Parceiro	J3 League	28	1	3	0	–		31	1
2017	Nagano Parceiro	J3 League	29	5	4	0	–		33	5
2018	Nagano Parceiro	J3 League	27	2	1	0	–		28	2
2019	Nagano Parceiro	J3 League	28	1	1	0	–		29	1
Total			240	20	16	2	2	0	258	22

^{1} Includes J2/J3 playoffs.
