= Rafael Fefo =

Brazilian footballer

Personal information
- Full name: Rafael Aparecido Elisbão
- Date of birth: February 15, 1985 (age 41)
- Place of birth: Piracicaba, Brazil
- Height: 1.82 m (6 ft 0 in)
- Position: Defensive midfielder

Youth career
- –2003: Corinthians

Senior career*
Years	Team	Apps	(Gls)
2004–2007	Corinthians	7	(0)
2008	Marília		
2009	Guarani	11	(0)
2010	Monte Azul	15	(1)
2011	Red Bull Brasil	3	(0)
2011?–2012	Carabobo	14	(0)
2013	Gainare Tottori	0	(0)
2013–2014	Zulia	20	(1)
2015	União Barbarense	17	(0)
2015	Volta Redonda	0	(0)
2016	Paulista	10	(0)
2017	Olímpia	10	(0)
2018	Marília	18	(0)
- * Club domestic league appearances and goals

Rafael Aparecido Elisbão, known as Rafael Fefo (born February 15, 1985 in Piracicaba) is a Brazilian former professional footballer who played as a defensive midfielder.
