= Oh Seung-hoon (footballer) =

South Korean footballer

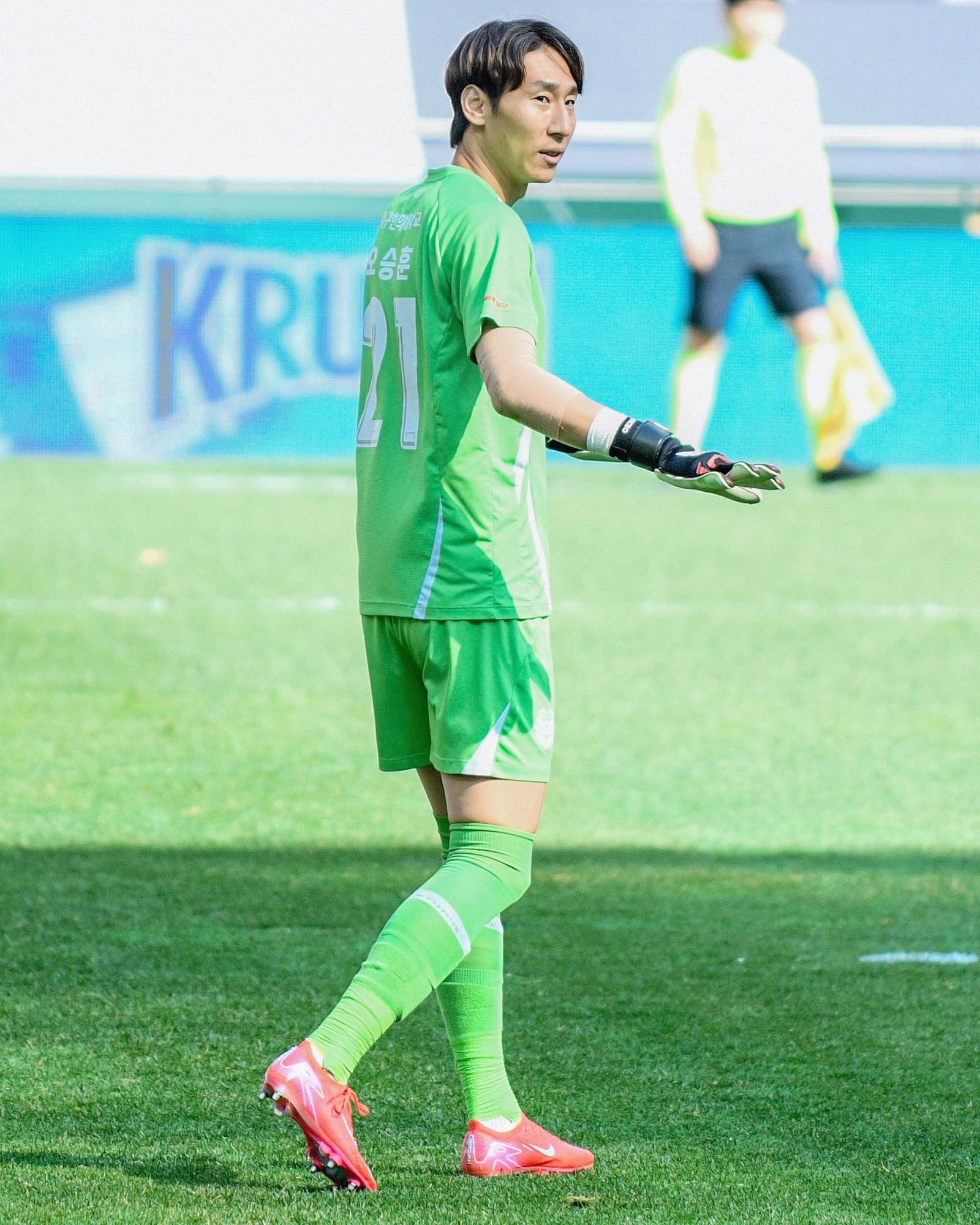
- Oh in 2025

Personal information
- Date of birth: June 30, 1988 (age 38)
- Place of birth: South Korea
- Height: 1.92 m (6 ft 4 in)
- Position: Goalkeeper

Team information
- Current team: Daegu FC
- Number: 21

Youth career
- –2009: Honam University

Senior career*
Years	Team	Apps	(Gls)
2010–2012	Tokushima Vortis	72	(0)
2013–2014	Kyoto Sanga FC	77	(0)
2015–2017	Daejeon Citizen	16	(0)
2016–2017	→ Sangju Sangmu (army)	41	(0)
2018–2019	Ulsan Hyundai	37	(0)
2019–2021	Jeju United	111	(0)
2022–	Daegu FC	101	(0)
- * Club domestic league appearances and goals as of 5 January 2026

Oh Seung-hoon (Korean: 오승훈; born June 30, 1988) is a South Korean football player who plays for Daegu FC.

== Club statistics ==
Updated to 22 October 2022.

Club performance			League		Cup		Continental		Total	
Season	Club	League	Apps	Goals	Apps	Goals	Apps	Goals	Apps	Goals
Japan			League		Emperor's Cup		ACL		Total	
2010	Tokushima Vortis	J2 League	7	0	0	0	—		7	0
2011	Tokushima Vortis	J2 League	34	0	0	0	—		34	0
2012	Tokushima Vortis	J2 League	31	0	1	0	—		32	0
2013	Kyoto Sanga FC	J2 League	42	0	1	0	—		43	0
2014	Kyoto Sanga FC	J2 League	35	0	2	0	—		37	0
South Korea			League		Korean FA Cup		ACL		Total	
2015	Daejeon Hana Citizen	K League 1	16	0	2	0	—		18	0
2016	Sangju Sangmu (army)	K League 1	18	0	1	0	—		19	0
2017	Sangju Sangmu (army)	K League 1	21	0	0	0	—		21	0
2018	Ulsan Hyundai	K League 1	17	0	1	0	5	0	23	0
2019	Ulsan Hyundai	K League 1	20	0	0	0	8	0	28	0
2019	Jeju United	K League 1	11	0	0	0	—		11	0
2020	Jeju United	K League 2	25	0	1	0	—		26	0
2021	Jeju United	K League 1	25	0	0	0	—		25	0
2022	Daegu FC	K League 1	36	0	3	0	6	1	45	1
Total			338	0	12	0	19	1	369	1
