= Kosei Shibasaki =

Japanese footballer

Kosei Shibasaki 柴崎 晃誠
Personal information
- Full name: Kosei Shibasaki
- Date of birth: August 28, 1984 (age 42)
- Place of birth: Unzen, Nagasaki, Japan
- Height: 1.77 m (5 ft 10 in)
- Position: Attacking midfielder

Youth career
- 2000–2002: Kunimi High School

College career
Years	Team	Apps	(Gls)
2003–2006	Kokushikan University		

Senior career*
Years	Team	Apps	(Gls)
2007–2010	Tokyo Verdy	109	(11)
2011–2012	Kawasaki Frontale	39	(1)
2012	→ Tokyo Verdy (loan)	13	(0)
2013	Tokushima Vortis	38	(6)
2014–2023	Sanfrecce Hiroshima	241	(26)
Total		440	(44)

International career
2002	Japan U-18		
Medal record
Sanfrecce Hiroshima
Winner	J1 League	2015
Runner-up	J1 League	2018
Runner-up	J.League Cup	2014
- * Club domestic league appearances and goals as of 25 November 2023

Kosei Shibasaki (柴崎 晃誠, Shibasaki Kōsei; born August 28, 1984 in Nagasaki) is a Japanese former footballer who played for Tokyo Verdy, Kawasaki Frontale, Tokushima Vortis and most notably Sanfrecce Hiroshima.

Shibasaki made over 500 career appearances across all competitions, scoring over 50 goals from midfield. He was part of the Sanfrecce Hiroshima team that won the J1 League in 2015 and the Japanese Super Cup in 2016. He spent 10 seasons with Sanfrecce before announcing his retirement at the end of the 2023 season.

In June 2011, Shibasaki was called up to be part of the Japan squad that faced Peru, although he did not play.

== Career statistics ==
=== Club ===
As of match played 25 November 2023

Appearances and goals by club, season and competition
Club	Season	League			National Cup		League Cup		Continental		Other		Total	
Club	Season	Division	Apps	Goals	Apps	Goals	Apps	Goals	Apps	Goals	Apps	Goals	Apps	Goals
Japan			League		Emperor's Cup		J. League Cup		AFC		Other		Total	
Kokushikan University	2003	JFL	4	0	0	0	—		—		—		4	0
Kokushikan University	2004	JFL	4	0	0	0	—		—		—		4	0
Kokushikan University	Total		8	0	0	0	—		—		—		8	0
Tokyo Verdy	2007	J2 League	6	0	1	0	—		—		—		7	0
Tokyo Verdy	2008	J1 League	21	1	1	0	2	0	—		—		24	1
Tokyo Verdy	2009	J2 League	47	7	1	0	—		—		—		48	7
Tokyo Verdy	2010	J2 League	35	3	1	0	—		—		—		36	3
Tokyo Verdy	Total		109	11	4	0	2	0	—		—		115	11
Kawasaki Frontale	2011	J1 League	31	1	3	0	2	0	—		—		36	1
Kawasaki Frontale	2012	J1 League	8	0	0	0	5	0	—		—		13	0
Kawasaki Frontale	Total		39	1	3	0	7	0	—		—		49	1
Tokyo Verdy (loan)	2012	J2 League	13	0	1	0	—		—		—		14	0
Tokushima Vortis	2013	J2 League	38	6	1	0	—		—		2 (Note: Appearances in the J1/J2 promotion playoffs)	0	41	6
Sanfrecce Hiroshima	2014	J1 League	22	1	1	0	4	0	7	1	1 (Note: Appearance in Japanese Super Cup)	0	35	2
Sanfrecce Hiroshima	2015	J1 League	27	6	0	0	2	0	—		3 (Note: Two appearances in J.League Championship) (Note: One appearance in the FIFA Club World Cup)	0	32	6
Sanfrecce Hiroshima	2016	J1 League	34	8	2	1	2	1	4	1	1	0	43	11
Sanfrecce Hiroshima	2017	J1 League	30	4	1	0	4	0	—		—		35	4
Sanfrecce Hiroshima	2018	J1 League	32	3	1	0	2	2	—		—		35	5
Sanfrecce Hiroshima	2019	J1 League	24	1	1	0	2	0	3	0	—		30	1
Sanfrecce Hiroshima	2020	J1 League	13	0	0	0	1	0	—		—		14	0
Sanfrecce Hiroshima	2021	J1 League	21	2	1	1	5	0	—		—		27	3
Sanfrecce Hiroshima	2022	J1 League	30	1	3	0	10	0	—		—		43	1
Sanfrecce Hiroshima	2023	J1 League	8	0	1	0	3	1	—		—		12	1
Sanfrecce Hiroshima	Total		241	26	11	2	35	4	14	2	5	0	306	34
Career total			448	44	20	2	44	4	14	2	7	0	533	52

== Honours ==
=== Club ===
Sanfrecce Hiroshima

- J1 League: 2015
- Japanese Super Cup: 2016
- J.League Cup: 2022
