= Sabia (footballer) =

Brazilian footballer

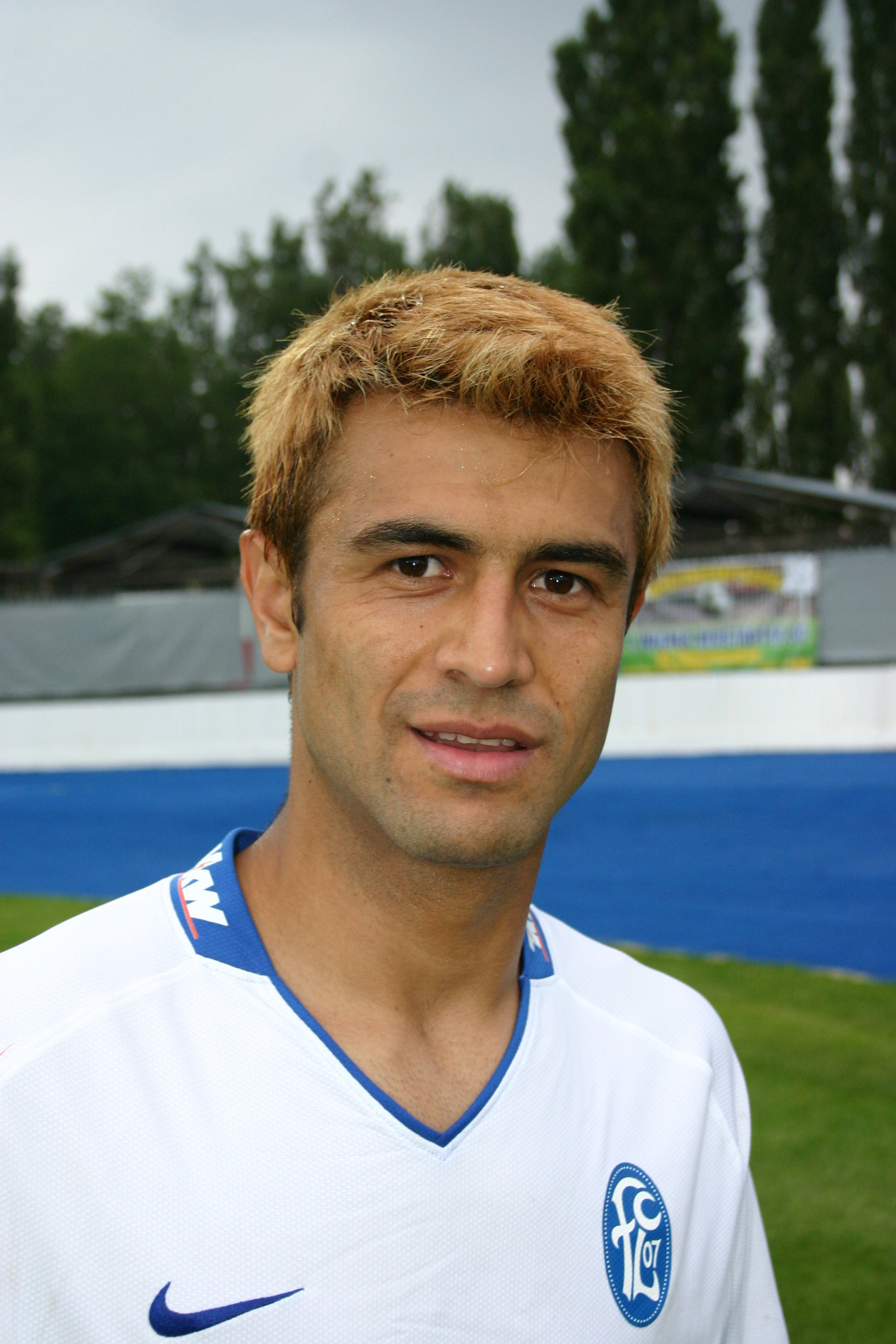
- Portrait of Sabia

Personal information
- Full name: Vilmar da Cunha Rodrigues
- Date of birth: November 2, 1982 (age 44)
- Place of birth: Porto União, Brazil
- Height: 1.75 m (5 ft 9 in)
- Position: Forward

Senior career*
Years	Team	Apps	(Gls)
2001–2002	Caxias do Sul		
2002–2003	Chapecoense		
2003	Tiradentes		
2003–2004	São Bento		
2004	Malutrom		
2004	Caxias		
2005	Guarani de Palhoça		
2005	Metropolitano		
2005–2006	Juventus Jaraguá		
2006–2009	Lustenau	81	(33)
2009–2010	Pasching	29	(17)
2010–2011	Vaduz	23	(11)
2011–2013	Tochigi SC	91	(31)
2014	Matsumoto Yamaga FC	30	(4)
2015	FC Machida Zelvia	1	(0)
- * Club domestic league appearances and goals as of 24 November 2014

Vilmar da Cunha Rodrigues (born November 2, 1982), commonly known as Sabia, is a Brazilian football player.
