= Takuya Marutani =

Japanese footballer

Takuya Marutani 丸谷 拓也
Personal information
- Full name: Takuya Marutani
- Date of birth: May 30, 1989 (age 37)
- Place of birth: Nanbu, Tottori, Japan
- Height: 1.78 m (5 ft 10 in)
- Position: Defensive midfielder

Youth career
- 2005–2007: Sakai High School

Senior career*
Years	Team	Apps	(Gls)
2008–2017	Sanfrecce Hiroshima	58	(2)
2012–2013	→ Oita Trinita (loan)	32	(1)
2018–2019	Oita Trinita	45	(2)
Medal record
Sanfrecce Hiroshima
Winner	J1 League	2012
Winner	J1 League	2015
Runner-up	J.League Cup	2010
Runner-up	J.League Cup	2014
- * Club domestic league appearances and goals as of 20 December 2019

Takuya Marutani (丸谷 拓也, Marutani Takuya; born May 30, 1989 in Nanbu, Tottori) is a Japanese retired football player who last played for Oita Trinita.

== Career ==
Marutani retired in December 2019.

== Career statistics ==
Updated to 25 February 2019.

Club performance			League		Cup		League Cup		Continental		Other^{1}		Total	
Season	Club	League	Apps	Goals	Apps	Goals	Apps	Goals	Apps	Goals	Apps	Goals	Apps	Goals
Japan			League		Emperor's Cup		League Cup		AFC				Total	
2008	Sanfrecce Hiroshima	J2 League	0	0	0	0	–		–		–		0	0
2009	Sanfrecce Hiroshima	J1 League	1	0	0	0	1	0	–		–		2	0
2010	Sanfrecce Hiroshima	J1 League	16	0	0	0	4	0	2	0	–		22	0
2011	Sanfrecce Hiroshima	J1 League	6	0	0	0	0	0	–		–		22	0
2012	Sanfrecce Hiroshima	J1 League	0	0	0	0	1	0	–		–		1	0
2012	Oita Trinita	J2 League	16	0	1	2	–		–		–		17	2
2013	Oita Trinita	J1 League	16	1	0	0	3	4	–		–		19	5
2014	Sanfrecce Hiroshima	J1 League	1	0	2	0	0	0	3	0	–		19	5
2015	Sanfrecce Hiroshima	J1 League	7	0	4	0	4	0	–		2	0	19	5
2016	Sanfrecce Hiroshima	J1 League	21	2	2	0	2	0	6	0	1	0	32	2
2017	Sanfrecce Hiroshima	J1 League	6	0	1	2	7	0	–		–		14	2
2018	Oita Trinita	J2 League	39	2	0	0	–		–		–		39	2
Career total			129	5	10	4	22	4	11	0	3	0	175	13

^{1}Includes Japanese Super Cup, J. League Championship and FIFA Club World Cup.
