= Kim Byeom-yong =

South Korean footballer (born 1990)

Personal information
- Full name: Kim Byeom-yong
- Date of birth: 29 July 1990 (age 36)
- Place of birth: South Korea
- Height: 1.81 m (5 ft 11 in)
- Positions: Defender; midfielder

Youth career
- 2000–2003: Daejeon Hwajeong Elementary School
- 2004–2005: Chungju Miduk Middle School
- 2006–2008: Goyang Nunggok High School

College career
Years	Team	Apps	(Gls)
2009–2012	Konkuk University		

Senior career*
Years	Team	Apps	(Gls)
2013–2015	Montedio Yamagata	53	(3)
2016–2017	Sanfrecce Hiroshima	2	(0)
2016–2017	→ Shimizu S-Pulse (loan)	8	(0)
2017	Shimizu S-Pulse	0	(0)
2017	→ JEF United Chiba (loan)	36	(2)
2018–2021	Suwon FC	38	(0)
2019	→ Pocheon Citizen (loan)	12	(0)
2022–2023	Gyeongnam FC	25	(0)
2023–2025	Renofa Yamaguchi	42	(1)
Total		214	(6)
- * Club domestic league appearances and goals as of 1 January 2026

- Kim Byeom-yong
- Hangul: 김범용
- RR: Gim Beomyong
- MR: Kim Pŏmyong

Kim Byeom-yong (Korean: 김범용; born 29 July 1990) is a South Korean former footballer who plays as a midfielder.

== Career ==
=== Montedio Yamagata ===
Kim made his official debut for Montedio Yamagata in the J. League Division 2 on 5 May 2013 against Fagiano Okayama. He was subbed on in the 81st minute, replacing Tomoyasu Hirose.

=== Sanfreece Hiroshima ===
On 7 January 2016, Kim was announced at Sanfreece Hiroshima. He made his league debut against Ventforet Kofu on 25 June 2016.

=== Loan to Shimizu S-Pulse ===
On 13 July 2016, Kim joined Shimizu S-Pulse on loan.

=== Shimizu S-Pulse and loan to JEF United Chiba ===
On 13 March 2017, Kim joined Shimizu S-Pulse on a permanent transfer, immediately being loaned to JEF United Chiba. On 18 December 2017, it was announced that his loan would expire at the end of the season.

=== Suwon FC ===
On 7 January 2018, Kim was announced at Suwon.

=== Loan to Pocheon Citizen ===
In 2019, Kim was loaned to Pocheon Citizen for military service.

=== Gyeongnam FC ===
On 7 January 2022, Kim was announced at Gyeongnam FC.

=== Renofa Yamaguchi ===
On 25 July 2023, Kim was announced at Renofa Yamaguchi. On 14 December 2023, his contract with the club was renewed for the 2024 season.

== Style of play ==
Kim can play as both a winger and a defender. He is noted for his physicality.

== Career statistics ==
Appearances and goals by club, season and competition
Club	Season	League			Cup		League Cup		Asia		Other		Total	
Club	Season	Division	Apps	Goals	Apps	Goals	Apps	Goals	Apps	Goals	Apps	Goals	Apps	Goals
Montedio Yamagata	2013	J2 League	10	0	3	0	—		—		—		13	0
Montedio Yamagata	2014	J2 League	14	1	4	1	—		—		—		18	2
Montedio Yamagata	2015	J1 League	27	2	2	0	6	0	—		—		35	2
Montedio Yamagata	Total		53	3	9	1	6	0	—		—		68	4
Sanfrecce Hiroshima	2016	J1 League	2	0	—		—		2	0	—		4	0
Shimizu S-Pulse (loan)	2016	J2 League	8	0	2	0	—		—		—		10	0
JEF United Chiba (loan)	2017	J2 League	36	2	2	0	—		—		—		38	2
Suwon FC	2018	K League 2	27	0	2	0	—		—		—		29	0
Suwon FC	2020	K League 2	2	0	—		—		—		1	0	3	0
Suwon FC	2021	K League 1	9	0	1	0	—		—		—		10	0
Suwon FC	Total		38	0	3	0	—		—		1	0	42	0
Pocheon Citizen (loan)	2019	K3 League Advanced			2	0	—		—		—		2	0
Pocheon Citizen (loan)	2020	K4 League	12	0	1	0	—		—		—		13	0
Pocheon Citizen (loan)	Total		12	0	3	0	—		—		—		15	0
Gyeongnam FC	2022	K League 2	20	0	1	0	—		—		2	0	23	0
Gyeongnam FC	2023	K League 2	5	0	0	0	—		—		—		5	0
Gyeongnam FC	Total		25	0	1	0	—		—		2	0	28	0
Renofa Yamaguchi	2023	J2 League	13	1	—		—		—		—		13	1
Renofa Yamaguchi	2024	J2 League	22	0	3	0	—		—		—		25	0
Renofa Yamaguchi	2025	J2 League	7	0	0	0	3	0	—		—		10	0
Renofa Yamaguchi	Total		42	1	3	0	3	0	—		—		48	1
Career total			214	6	23	1	9	0	2	0	3	0	251	7
