= Osmar (footballer, born August 1987) =

Brazilian footballer

Personal information
- Full name: Osmar Francisco Moreira Jesuino
- Date of birth: 10 August 1987 (age 39)
- Place of birth: Santa Catarina, Brazil
- Height: 1.80 m (5 ft 11 in)
- Position: Forward

Senior career*
Years	Team	Apps	(Gls)
2009–2010	Paraná		
2010–2011	Operário Ferroviário		
2011–2012	Santa Cruz	11	(2)
2012	Lajeadense	10	(0)
2012	Foz do Iguaçu		
2012–2013	Avispa Fukuoka	23	(5)
2013	Ehime FC	8	(0)
2014	Mito HollyHock	10	(1)
2015	Paraná	3	(0)
2015–2016	Hoàng Anh Gia Lai	7	(5)
2018	Sông Lam Nghệ An	8	(1)
2018	Hoàng Anh Gia Lai	10	(2)
2019	Penapolense	6	(1)
2019	Real SC	0	(0)
2020	Rio Branco-PR	3	(0)
2021	Kirivong Sok Sen Chey	15	(3)
- * Club domestic league appearances and goals as of 2 October 2018

Osmar Francisco Moreira Jesuino, or simply Osmar (born 10 August 1987) is a Brazilian footballer who plays as a forward.

== Career ==
Osmar joined J2 League club Avispa Fukuoka in August 2012. He made his debut on 12 August 2012 against Shonan Bellmare, losing the game 3-1.

On 10 August 2013, Osmar joined Ehime FC, on a half-year loan from Fukuoka.

=== Hoàng Anh Gia Lai ===
Osmar joined V.League 1 club Hoàng Anh Gia Lai in December 2015.
