= Norihiro Yamagishi =

Japanese footballer

Norihiro Yamagishi 山岸 範宏
Personal information
- Full name: Norihiro Yamagishi
- Date of birth: 17 May 1978 (age 48)
- Place of birth: Kumagaya, Saitama, Japan
- Height: 1.85 m (6 ft 1 in)
- Position: Goalkeeper

Youth career
- 1994–1996: Kumagaya High School
- 1997–2000: Chukyo University

Senior career*
Years	Team	Apps	(Gls)
2001–2014	Urawa Reds	137	(0)
2014–2016	Montedio Yamagata	99	(1)
2017–2018	Giravanz Kitakyushu	22	(0)
Total		258	(1)
Medal record
Urawa Reds
Winner	AFC Champions League	2007
Winner	J1 League	2006
Runner-up	J1 League	2004
Runner-up	J1 League	2005
Runner-up	J1 League	2007
Runner-up	J1 League	2014
Winner	J.League Cup	2003
Runner-up	J.League Cup	2002
Runner-up	J.League Cup	2004
Runner-up	J.League Cup	2011
Runner-up	J.League Cup	2013
Winner	Emperor's Cup	2005
Winner	Emperor's Cup	2006
Montedio Yamagata
Runner-up	Emperor's Cup	2014
- * Club domestic league appearances and goals

Norihiro Yamagishi (山岸 範宏, Yamagishi Norihiro; born 17 May 1978) is a Japanese football player.

== Playing career ==
Yamagishi was born in Kumagaya on 17 May 1978. After graduating from Chukyo University, he joined J1 League club Urawa Reds based in his local Saitama Prefecture in 2001. He debuted in 2002 and became a regular goalkeeper. However, he lost his position to the new player, Ryota Tsuzuki, in 2003. From 2003, Yamagishi battled with Tsuzuki for the position until 2010. Reds won the champions in 2003 J.League Cup. Although in 2005, he could hardly play in the match; when the Reds won the Emperor's Cup. In 2006, he became a regular goalkeeper from May, when the Reds won J1 League championship. Although he could hardly play in the match from 2007, he became a regular goalkeeper again from September 2009. In 2010, he played full-time in all 34 matches. However, he could not play many matches behind Nobuhiro Kato from 2011. In 2014, he could not play at all in the game behind new player Shusaku Nishikawa.

In June 2014, Yamagishi moved to J2 League club Montedio Yamagata. He became a regular goalkeeper soon. He entered the history of Japanese football by scoring in the 2014 J2 League playoffs match against Júbilo Iwata. In the 91st minute of the game, he headed the 1-1 from a corner kick: a result which let Montedio go through to the final. In the final, Montedio won the match and was promoted to J1. Montedio also won 2nd place in the 2014 Emperor's Cup. In 2015, although he played full-time in all 34 matches, Montedio finished at the bottom place and was relegated to J2 end of the 2015 season. He played for the club until the end of the 2016 season.

After three seasons with Montedio, Yamagishi decided to move to Giravanz Kitakyushu, which had just got relegated to J3 League. He retired end of 2018 season.

== Club statistics ==
Updated to 1 January 2019.

Club	Season	League		Emperor's Cup		J.League Cup		AFC		Other^{1}		Total	
Club	Season	Apps	Goals	Apps	Goals	Apps	Goals	Apps	Goals	Apps	Goals	Apps	Goals
Urawa Red Diamonds	2001	0	0	0	0	0	0	-		-		0	0
Urawa Red Diamonds	2002	26	0	1	0	3	0	-		-		30	0
Urawa Red Diamonds	2003	10	0	1	0	5	0	-		-		16	0
Urawa Red Diamonds	2004	11	0	4	0	2	0	-		2	0	19	0
Urawa Red Diamonds	2005	1	0	3	0	1	0	-		-		5	0
Urawa Red Diamonds	2006	24	0	0	0	6	0	-		-		30	0
Urawa Red Diamonds	2007	1	0	1	0	1	0	0	0	3	0	6	0
Urawa Red Diamonds	2008	1	0	1	0	3	0	1	0	-		6	0
Urawa Red Diamonds	2009	11	0	1	0	8	0	-		-		20	0
Urawa Red Diamonds	2010	34	0	4	0	0	0	-		-		38	0
Urawa Red Diamonds	2011	9	0	3	0	2	0	-		-		14	0
Urawa Red Diamonds	2012	0	0	1	0	3	0	-		-		4	0
Urawa Red Diamonds	2013	9	0	1	0	3	0	0	0	-		13	0
Urawa Red Diamonds	2014	0	0	0	0	0	0	-		-		0	0
Montedio Yamagata	2014	24	0	6	0	-		-		2	1	32	1
Montedio Yamagata	2015	34	0	3	0	6	0	-		-		43	0
Montedio Yamagata	2016	41	0	1	0	-		-		-		42	0
Giravanz Kitakyushu	2017	17	0	1	0	-		-		-		18	0
Giravanz Kitakyushu	2018	5	0	-		-		-		-		5	0
Career total		258	0	32	0	43	0	1	0	7	1	341	1

^{1}Includes other competitive competitions, including the J.League Championship, Japanese Super Cup, A3 Champions Cup and J2 League Playoffs.

== Honours ==
=== Club ===
Urawa Reds

- AFC Champions League: 1

2007

- J1 League: 1

2006

- Emperor's Cup: 2

2005, 2006

- J.League Cup: 1

2003

- Japanese Super Cup: 1

2006

Montedio Yamagata

- J2 League Playoffs: 1

2014
