= Yuichiro Nagai =

Japanese footballer

Yuichiro Nagai 永井 雄一郎
Personal information
- Date of birth: 14 February 1979 (age 47)
- Place of birth: Shinjuku, Tokyo, Japan
- Height: 1.84 m (6 ft 0 in)
- Position: Forward

Youth career
- 1994–1996: Mitsubishi Yowa

Senior career*
Years	Team	Apps	(Gls)
1997–2008	Urawa Reds	278	(63)
1998–1999	→ Karlsruher SC II (loan)	21	(4)
2009–2011	Shimizu S-Pulse	39	(1)
2012–2013	Yokohama FC	21	(3)
2014	Arterivo Wakayama	11	(3)
2015–2017	Thespakusatsu Gunma	43	(0)
Total		413	(74)

International career
1997–1999	Japan U-23	12	(2)
2003	Japan	4	(1)
Medal record
Urawa Reds
Winner	AFC Champions League	2007
Winner	J1 League	2006
Runner-up	J1 League	2004
Runner-up	J1 League	2005
Runner-up	J1 League	2007
Winner	J.League Cup	2003
Runner-up	J.League Cup	2002
Runner-up	J.League Cup	2004
Winner	Emperor's Cup	2005
Winner	Emperor's Cup	2006
Shimizu S-Pulse
Runner-up	Emperor's Cup	2010
Representing Japan
FIFA U-20 World Cup
Silver medal – second place	1999 Nigeria
- * Club domestic league appearances and goals

Yuichiro Nagai (永井 雄一郎, Nagai Yūichirō; born 14 February 1979) is a Japanese former professional footballer who played as a forward. He made four appearances for the Japan national team scoring once.

== Club career ==
Nagai played his youth football at Mitsubishi Yowa Club. After graduating from high school in 1997, he joined Urawa Reds. He made his professional debut on 12 April of that year in the opening league match against Yokohama Marinos at Urawa Komaba Stadium.

Nagai was loaned out to German 2. Bundesliga side Karlsruher SC from 1998 to 1999. He played 21 league games and scored 4 goals for reserve team.

In 2003, Nagai took over the number "9" jersey from iconic Masahiro Fukuda after the latter retired from the game. He scored a hat trick against Tokyo Verdy on 21 August 2004. In the same match, his teammate Koji Yamase also scored three goals. On 1 January 2007, he was instrumental in Urawa defending the Emperor's Cup by scoring a late winner assisted by Masayuki Okano. The club won the championship 2006 J1 League, 2003 J.League Cup, 2005 and 2006 Emperor's Cup until 2006.

In 2007, AFC Champions League, Nagai helped Urawa win the tournament scoring 3 goals. He was named the player of the tournament. Urawa also won the 3rd place at 2007 FIFA Club World Cup.

On 7 January 2009, Nagai transferred to Shimizu S-Pulse. He played until 2011. After that, he played for Yokohama FC (2012–13), Arterivo Wakayama (2014) and Thespakusatsu Gunma (2015–17).

== International career ==
Nagai was a member of the Japan team for the 1997 World Youth Championship hosted by Malaysia. He played all 5 matches and scored a goal against Costa Rica at the group stage. The team was eliminated at the quarterfinal. He also represented Japan at the 1999 World Youth Championship hosted by Nigeria. He played all 7 matches and scored a goal in the semi-final against Uruguay and contributed to the team finishing runners-up in the competition.

He made his full international debut for Japan on 21 April 2003 in a friendly against South Korea at Seoul World Cup Stadium. His first international goal was the winner in the same match. He also played at 2003 Confederations Cup. He is so far capped 4 times and scored 1 goal.

== Career statistics ==
=== Club ===
Appearances and goals by club, season and competition
Club	Season	League			National cup (Note: Includes Emperor's Cup, DFB-Pokal.)		League cup (Note: Includes J.League Cup)		Continental		Other		Total	
Club	Season	Division	Apps	Goals	Apps	Goals	Apps	Goals	Apps	Goals	Apps	Goals	Apps	Goals
Urawa Reds	1997	J1 League	30	3	2	0	6	0	–		–		38	3
Urawa Reds	1998	J1 League	3	0	0	0	0	0	–		–		3	0
Urawa Reds	1999	J1 League	12	3	2	0	2	1	–		–		16	4
Urawa Reds	2000	J2 League	29	12	1	0	2	1	–		–		32	13
Urawa Reds	2001	J1 League	25	6	4	1	6	1	–		–		35	8
Urawa Reds	2002	J1 League	19	4	1	1	4	0	–		–		24	5
Urawa Reds	2003	J1 League	23	8	1	0	8	1	–		–		32	9
Urawa Reds	2004	J1 League	27	6	4	2	8	1	–		–		39	9
Urawa Reds	2005	J1 League	30	6	2	0	7	0	–		–		39	6
Urawa Reds	2006	J1 League	23	4	4	3	6	2	–		–		33	9
Urawa Reds	2007	J1 League	31	6	1	0	2	1	11	3	3 (Note: Appearances in FIFA Club World Cup)	1	48	11
Urawa Reds	2008	J1 League	26	5	1	0	4	0	3	0	–		34	5
Urawa Reds	Total		278	63	23	7	55	8	14	3	3	1	373	82
Karlsruher SC II	1998–99	Regionalliga	21	4	–		–		–		–		21	4
Shimizu S-Pulse	2009	J1 League	8	0	3	2	3	0	–		–		14	2
Shimizu S-Pulse	2010	J1 League	14	1	4	0	8	2	–		–		26	3
Shimizu S-Pulse	2011	J1 League	17	0	1	1	2	0	–		–		20	1
Shimizu S-Pulse	Total		39	1	8	3	13	2	0	0	0	0	60	6
Yokohama FC	2012	J2 League	7	2	0	0	–		–		–		7	2
Yokohama FC	2013	J2 League	14	1	0	0	–		–		–		14	1
Yokohama FC	Total		21	3	0	0	0	0	0	0	0	0	21	3
Arterivo Wakayama	2014	Regional Leagues	11	3	1	1	–		–		–		14	4
Thespakusatsu Gunma	2015	J2 League	31	0	1	0	–		–		–		32	0
Thespakusatsu Gunma	2016	J2 League	10	0	1	0	–		–		–		11	0
Thespakusatsu Gunma	2017	J2 League	2	0	0	0	–		–		–		2	0
Thespakusatsu Gunma	Total		43	0	2	0	0	0	0	0	0	0	45	0
Career total			413	74	34	11	68	10	14	3	3	1	534	99

=== International ===
Japan national team
Year	Apps	Goals
2003	4	1
Total	4	1

#	Date	Venue	Opponent	Score	Result	Competition
1.	16 April 2003	Seoul, South Korea	South Korea	1–0	Won	Friendly

== Honors ==
- AFC Champions League: 2007
- J1 League: 2006
- Emperor's Cup: 2005, 2006
- J.League Cup: 2004
- Japanese Super Cup: 2006
- FIFA World Youth Championship runner-up: 1999

Individual

- AFC Champions League Player of the Tournament: 2007
