= 2005 Urawa Red Diamonds season =

Urawa Red Diamonds
2005 season
- Manager: Guido Buchwald
- Stadium: Saitama Stadium 2002
- J. League 1: Runners-up
- Emperor's Cup: Champions
- J. League Cup: Semifinals
- Top goalscorer: Marcus Tulio Tanaka (9)
Home colours	Away colours

During the 2005 season, Urawa Red Diamonds competed in the J. League 1, in which they finished as runners-up.

== Competitions ==
Competitions	Position
J. League 1	Runners-up / 18 clubs
Emperor's Cup	Champions
J. League Cup	Semifinals

== Domestic results ==
=== J. League 1 ===
==== League table ====
Pos	Team	Pld	W	D	L	GF	GA	GD	Pts	Qualification or relegation
1	Gamba Osaka (C)	34	18	6	10	82	58	+24	60	Qualification for 2006 AFC Champions League Group stage (Note: Tokyo Verdy 1969 qualified to 2006 AFC Champions League as 2004 Emperor's Cup winners.)
2	Urawa Red Diamonds	34	17	8	9	65	37	+28	59	
3	Kashima Antlers	34	16	11	7	61	39	+22	59	
4	JEF United Ichihara Chiba	34	16	11	7	56	42	+14	59	
5	Cerezo Osaka	34	16	11	7	48	40	+8	59	

Updated to match(es) played on December 3, 2005. Source: J. League Division 1
Rules for classification: 1) points; 2) goal difference; 3) number of goals scored.
(C) Champions

==== Results summary ====
Overall								Home						Away					
Pld	W	D	L	GF	GA	GD	Pts	W	D	L	GF	GA	GD	W	D	L	GF	GA	GD
34	17	8	9	65	37	+28	59	8	5	4	31	16	+15	9	3	5	34	21	+13

Source: J. League Data Site

==== Result round by round ====
Round	1	2	3	4	5	6	7	8	9	10	11	12	13	14	15	16	17	18	19	20	21	22	23	24	25	26	27	28	29	30	31	32	33	34
Ground	H	A	A	H	H	A	H	A	H	A	H	A	H	A	H	A	H	A	H	H	A	A	H	A	H	A	H	A	H	A	H	A	H	A
Result	L	D	L	D	D	W	L	D	W	W	D	W	W	W	L	L	W	W	W	D	W	D	L	W	D	L	W	W	W	L	W	L	W	W
Position	14	15	17	18	17	14	16	17	13	8	10	6	4	3	5	8	4	3	3	4	3	3	4	3	3	6	4	4	3	4	4	4	3	2

Source: J. League Data Site
A = Away; H = Home; W = Win; D = Draw; L = Loss

==== Matches ====
Match	Date	Venue	Opponents	Score
1	2005.03.05	Saitama Stadium 2002	Kashima Antlers	0-1
2	2005.03.12	Todoroki Athletics Stadium	Kawasaki Frontale	3-3
3	2005.04.02	[[]]	Oita Trinita	0-1
4	2005.04.09	Saitama Stadium 2002	Gamba Osaka	1-1
5	2005.04.13	Saitama Stadium 2002	Shimizu S-Pulse	1-1
6	2005.04.16	[[]]	FC Tokyo	2-0
7	2005.04.23	Saitama Stadium 2002	Cerezo Osaka	1-2
8	2005.04.28	[[]]	Júbilo Iwata	2-2
9	2005.05.01	Saitama Stadium 2002	Nagoya Grampus Eight	3-0
10	2005.05.04	[[]]	Vissel Kobe	1-0
11	2005.05.08	Saitama Stadium 2002	JEF United Chiba	0-0
12	2005.05.15	[[]]	Yokohama F. Marinos	1-0
13	2005.07.03	Saitama Stadium 2002	Albirex Niigata	2-1
14	2005.07.06	[[]]	Tokyo Verdy	7-0
15	2005.07.09	Saitama Stadium 2002	Omiya Ardija	1-2
16	2005.07.13	[[]]	Kashiwa Reysol	0-3
17	2005.07.18	Saitama Stadium 2002	Sanfrecce Hiroshima	2-0
18	2005.07.23	[[]]	Shimizu S-Pulse	1-0
19	2005.08.20	Saitama Stadium 2002	FC Tokyo	2-1
20	2005.08.24	Saitama Stadium 2002	Vissel Kobe	2-2
21	2005.08.27	[[]]	Nagoya Grampus Eight	2-0
22	2005.09.03	[[]]	Kashima Antlers	2-2
23	2005.09.10	Saitama Stadium 2002	Oita Trinita	1-2
24	2005.09.18	[[]]	Sanfrecce Hiroshima	4-3
25	2005.09.24	Saitama Stadium 2002	Yokohama F. Marinos	0-0
26	2005.10.02	Nagai Stadium	Cerezo Osaka	1-3
27	2005.10.15	Saitama Stadium 2002	Kashiwa Reysol	7-0
28	2005.10.22	Saitama Stadium 2002	Omiya Ardija	3-1
29	2005.10.29	Saitama Stadium 2002	Kawasaki Frontale	3-2
30	2005.11.12	Osaka Expo '70 Stadium	Gamba Osaka	1-2
31	2005.11.20	Saitama Stadium 2002	Tokyo Verdy	4-1
32	2005.11.23	Fukuda Denshi Arena	JEF United Chiba	0-1
33	2005.11.26	Saitama Stadium 2002	Júbilo Iwata	3-1

3 December 2005 34	Albirex Niigata	0–4	Urawa Red Diamonds	Niigata
14:04	Kuwabara (yellow card) 34'; Fabinho (yellow card) 50'; Homma (yellow card) 79'	Report; Highlights	Horinouchi 4'; Ponte 13'; Yamada (yellow card) 41' (goal) 80'; Alex (yellow card) 44'; Marić 60'	Stadium: Big Swan Stadium; Attendance: 41,988; Referee: Kazuhiko Matsumura

=== Emperor's Cup ===
Urawa Red Diamonds received a bye to the fourth round as being part of the J.League Division 1.

3 November 2005 Fourth Round	Urawa Red Diamonds	2–1	Montedio Yamagata	Saitama
	Marić 56', 58'	Report	Hayashi 11'	Stadium: Saitama Stadium 2002; Attendance: 15,772

10 December 2005 Fifth Round	Urawa Red Diamonds	2–0	FC Tokyo	Saitama
	Marić 31'; Yamada 62'	Report		Stadium: Saitama Stadium 2002; Attendance: 8,355

24 December 2005 Quarterfinals	Urawa Red Diamonds	2–0	Kawasaki Frontale	Saitama
	Marić 69'; Horinouchi 84'	Report		Stadium: Saitama Stadium 2002; Attendance: 27,589

29 December 2005 Semifinals	Omiya Ardija	2–4 (a.e.t.)	Urawa Red Diamonds	Tokyo
	Kataoka 27'; Tomita 90'	Report	Marić 24'; Hasebe 63', 103'; Yamada 96'	Stadium: National Stadium; Attendance: 31,441

1 January 2006 Final	Urawa Red Diamonds	2–1	Shimizu S-Pulse	Tokyo
	Horinouchi 39'; Marić 73'	Report	Ichikawa 76'; Hiramatsu (red card) 84'	Stadium: National Stadium; Attendance: 51,536; Referee: Toru Kamikawa

Urawa Red Diamonds qualified to the 2006 Japanese Super Cup and the 2007 AFC Champions League.

=== J. League Cup ===
Group stage

Team	Pld	W	D	L	GF	GA	GD	Pts
Urawa Red Diamonds	6	5	0	1	10	7	+3	15
Omiya Ardija	6	3	1	2	9	6	+3	10
Albirex Niigata	6	3	1	2	7	5	+2	10
Vissel Kobe	6	0	0	6	1	9	−8	0

19 March 2005 1	Vissel Kobe	1–2	Urawa Red Diamonds	Kobe
13:00	Niwa (yellow card) 23'; Miura 68'; Horváth (yellow card) 42'	Report	Yamada 37'; Emerson Sheik 42'; M. Tanaka (yellow card) 69'	Stadium: Kobe Wing Stadium; Attendance: 12,748; Referee: Toru Kamikawa

26 March 2005 2	Urawa Red Diamonds	2–1	Omiya Ardija	Saitama
16:05	T. Tanaka 15' (yellow card) 80'; Emerson Sheik 23'; Özalan (yellow card) 89'	Report	Christian (yellow card) 34'; Tomita 64'; Toninho (yellow card) 89'	Stadium: Urawa Komaba Stadium; Attendance: 17,494; Referee: Kiyoshi Ota

21 May 2005 3	Urawa Red Diamonds	2–1	Albirex Niigata	Saitama
14:05	Emerson Sheik 6'; Suzuki 60'; Hsebe (yellow card) 62'	Report	Homma (yellow card) 18'; Fabinho (yellow card) 51'; Edmílson 74'	Stadium: Saitama Stadium 2002; Attendance: 30,744; Referee: Toru Kamikawa

28 May 2005 4	Urawa Red Diamonds	1–0	Vissel Kobe	Saitama
16:04	Emerson Sheik (yellow card) 35' (goal) 89'; Özalan (yellow card) 43'	Report	Saeki (yellow card) 14'; Muroi (yellow card) 29'; Horváth (yellow card) 65'; Kitamoto (yellow card) 77'	Stadium: Urawa Komaba Stadium; Attendance: 16,735; Referee: Toshimitsu Yoshida

4 June 2005 5	Omiya Ardija	1–3	Urawa Red Diamonds	Saitama
15:00	Toninho (yellow card) 25' (yellow-red card) 51'; Christian (yellow card) 31'; Tuto 57'	Report	Suzuki 10'; Emerson Sheik 27'; T. Tanaka 32'; Yamada (yellow card) 85'	Stadium: Saitama Stadium 2002; Attendance: 26,397; Referee: Masaaki Iemoto

11 June 2005 6	Albirex Niigata	3–0	Urawa Red Diamonds	Niigata
13:04	Edmílson 7', 37'; Fabinho 32'; Kaimoto (yellow card) 73'	Report	Özalan (yellow card) 6' (yellow-red card) 18'; M. Tanaka (yellow card) 20'; Yamada (yellow card) 48'	Stadium: "Big Swan" Stadium; Attendance: 39,154; Referee: Keiichi Sunakawa

Quarterfinals

6 August 2005 1st Leg	Shimizu S-Pulse	0–1	Urawa Red Diamonds	Shizuoka
19:00	Ichikawa (yellow card) 4'; Morioka (yellow card) 71'	Report	Horinouchi (yellow card) 33'; Hasebe 36'; M. Tanaka (yellow card) 55'	Stadium: Nihondaira Sports Stadium; Attendance: 12,572; Referee: Yoshitsugu Katayama

14 August 2005 2nd Leg	Urawa Red Diamonds	1–0 (2–0 agg.)	Shimizu S-Pulse	Saitama
18:05	Suzuki (yellow card) 68'; Hasebe 88'	Report	Cho Jae-jin (yellow card) 17' (yellow-red card) 32'; Morioka (yellow card) 36'	Stadium: Saitama Stadium 2002; Attendance: 31,754; Referee: Kazuhiko Matsumura

Semifinals

31 August 2005 1st Leg	Urawa Red Diamonds	1–3	JEF United Chiba	Saitama
19:00	Ponte 44'; Alex (yellow card) 52'; Suzuki (yellow card) 64'	Report	Maki 1', 17'; Saito (yellow card) 50'; Yuki (yellow card) 53'; Popescu 55'	Stadium: Urawa Komaba Stadium; Attendance: 17,265; Referee: Kazuhisa Osada

5 October 2005 2nd Leg	JEF United Chiba	2–2 (5–3 agg.)	Urawa Red Diamonds	Ichihara
19:05	Mizumoto (yellow card) 32'; Abe 47', 86'; Haas (yellow card) 89'	Report	M. Tanaka 19' (yellow card) 47' (yellow-red card) 70'; Ponte (yellow card) 24'; T. Tanaka 27' (yellow card) 86'; Yamada (yellow card) 63'; Uchidate (yellow card) 68'; Tsuzuki (yellow card) 87'	Stadium: Ichihara Stadium; Attendance: 11,286; Referee: Toru Kamikawa

== International results ==
=== International friendlies ===
31 May 2005 Friendly	Urawa Red Diamonds (Japan)	0–2	(Germany) Hamburger SV	Saitama
		Report	Reinhardt 20'; Şen 89'	Stadium: Saitama Stadium 2002; Attendance: 11,983; Referee: Kazuhiko Matsumura

15 June 2005 Saitama City Cup	Urawa Red Diamonds (Japan)	0–3	(Spain) Barcelona	Saitama
19:04	Yamada (yellow card) 69'	Report	Xavi 11'; Navarro (yellow card) 23'; Larsson 39', 77'	Stadium: Saitama Stadium 2002; Attendance: 57,143; Referee: Joji Kashihara

== Player statistics ==
No.	Pos.	Player	D.o.B. (Age)	Height / Weight	J. League 1		Emperor's Cup		J. League Cup		Total	
No.	Pos.	Player	D.o.B. (Age)	Height / Weight	Apps	Goals	Apps	Goals	Apps	Goals	Apps	Goals
1	GK	Norihiro Yamagishi	May 17, 1978 (aged 26)	cm / kg	1	0						
2	DF	Keisuke Tsuboi	September 16, 1979 (aged 25)	cm / kg	33	0						
3	DF	Alpay Özalan	May 29, 1973 (aged 31)	cm / kg	3	0						
4	DF	Marcus Tulio Tanaka	April 24, 1981 (aged 23)	cm / kg	26	9						
5	DF	Nenê	June 6, 1975 (aged 29)	cm / kg	10	1						
6	DF	Nobuhisa Yamada	September 10, 1975 (aged 29)	cm / kg	32	3						
7	MF	Tomoyuki Sakai	June 29, 1979 (aged 25)	cm / kg	18	2						
8	MF	Alessandro Santos	July 20, 1977 (aged 27)	cm / kg	32	4						
9	FW	Yuichiro Nagai	February 14, 1979 (aged 26)	cm / kg	30	6						
10	FW	Emerson	September 6, 1981 (aged 23)	cm / kg	12	4						
10	MF	Robson Ponte	November 6, 1976 (aged 28)	cm / kg	16	8						
11	FW	Tatsuya Tanaka	November 27, 1982 (aged 22)	cm / kg	25	8						
12	MF	Masaya Nishitani	September 16, 1978 (aged 26)	cm / kg	2	0						
13	MF	Keita Suzuki	July 8, 1981 (aged 23)	cm / kg	29	0						
14	DF	Tadaaki Hirakawa	May 1, 1979 (aged 25)	cm / kg	26	2						
15	MF	Toru Chishima	May 11, 1981 (aged 23)	cm / kg	0	0						
17	MF	Makoto Hasebe	January 18, 1984 (aged 21)	cm / kg	31	2						
18	FW	Naoya Umeda	April 27, 1978 (aged 26)	cm / kg	0	0						
18	FW	Tomislav Marić	January 28, 1973 (aged 32)	cm / kg	13	8						
19	DF	Hideki Uchidate	January 15, 1974 (aged 31)	cm / kg	26	0						
20	DF	Satoshi Horinouchi	October 26, 1979 (aged 25)	cm / kg	23	3						
21	GK	Kenta Tokushige	March 9, 1984 (aged 20)	cm / kg	0	0						
22	MF	Shunsuke Oyama	April 6, 1986 (aged 18)	cm / kg	0	0						
23	GK	Ryōta Tsuzuki	April 18, 1978 (aged 26)	cm / kg	33	0						
24	DF	Tetsushi Kondo	November 4, 1986 (aged 18)	cm / kg	0	0						
25	MF	Takafumi Akahoshi	May 27, 1986 (aged 18)	cm / kg	2	0						
26	DF	Yuzo Minami	November 17, 1983 (aged 21)	cm / kg	0	0						
27	FW	Takuya Yokoyama	June 29, 1985 (aged 19)	cm / kg	9	2						
28	GK	Nobuhiro Kato	December 11, 1984 (aged 20)	cm / kg	0	0						
29	MF	Shota Arai	April 7, 1985 (aged 19)	cm / kg	0	0						
30	FW	Masayuki Okano	July 25, 1972 (aged 32)	cm / kg	20	1						
31	FW	Yuya Nakamura	April 14, 1986 (aged 18)	cm / kg	0	0						
32	MF	Hajime Hosogai	June 10, 1986 (aged 18)	cm / kg	3	0						
33	DF	Santos	March 31, 1987 (aged 17)	cm / kg	0	0						
34	FW	Sergio Escudero	September 1, 1988 (aged 16)	cm / kg	5	0						

== Other pages ==
- (in Japanese) J. League official site
