= Yuzo Minami =

Japanese footballer

Yuzo Minami 南 祐三
Personal information
- Full name: Yuzo Minami
- Date of birth: November 17, 1983 (age 42)
- Place of birth: Iruma, Saitama, Japan
- Height: 1.83 m (6 ft 0 in)
- Position: Defender

Youth career
- 1999–2001: Seibudai High School

Senior career*
Years	Team	Apps	(Gls)
2002–2006	Urawa Reds	0	(0)
2006–2008	Ehime FC	39	(3)
2009–2010	V-Varen Nagasaki	9	(0)
Total		48	(3)
Medal record
Urawa Reds
Winner	J1 League	2006
Runner-up	J1 League	2004
Runner-up	J1 League	2005
Winner	J.League Cup	2003
Runner-up	J.League Cup	2002
Runner-up	J.League Cup	2004
Winner	Emperor's Cup	2005
Winner	Emperor's Cup	2006
- * Club domestic league appearances and goals

Yuzo Minami (南 祐三, Minami Yuzō; born November 17, 1983) is a former Japanese football player.

== Playing career ==
Minami was born in Iruma on November 17, 1983. After graduating from high school, he joined J1 League club Urawa Reds based in his local Saitama Prefecture in 2002. On June 4, 2005, he debuted as substitute defender against Omiya Ardija in J.League Cup. However he could only play this match until 2006. In August 2006, he moved to newly was promoted to J2 League club, Ehime FC. He became a regular player as center back in 2006 season. However his opportunity to play decreased from 2007. In 2009, he moved to Japan Football League club V-Varen Nagasaki. However he could not play many matches and retired end of 2010 season.

== Club statistics ==
Club performance			League		Cup		League Cup		Total	
Season	Club	League	Apps	Goals	Apps	Goals	Apps	Goals	Apps	Goals
Japan			League		Emperor's Cup		J.League Cup		Total	
2002	Urawa Reds	J1 League	0	0	0	0	0	0	0	0
2003	Urawa Reds	J1 League	0	0	0	0	0	0	0	0
2004	Urawa Reds	J1 League	0	0	0	0	0	0	0	0
2005	Urawa Reds	J1 League	0	0	0	0	1	0	1	0
2006	Urawa Reds	J1 League	0	0	0	0	0	0	0	0
2006	Ehime FC	J2 League	14	1	2	0	-		16	1
2007	Ehime FC	J2 League	11	0	0	0	-		11	0
2008	Ehime FC	J2 League	14	2	1	0	-		15	2
2009	V-Varen Nagasaki	Football League	5	0	0	0	-		5	0
2010	V-Varen Nagasaki	Football League	4	0	0	0	-		4	0
Total			48	3	3	0	1	0	52	3
