= 2002 Urawa Red Diamonds season =

Urawa Red Diamonds
2002 season
- Manager: Hans Ooft
- Stadium: Saitama Stadium 2002
- J.League 1: 11th
- Emperor's Cup: 3rd Round
- J.League Cup: Runners-up
- Top goalscorer: Emerson (15)
Home colours	Away colours

2002 Urawa Red Diamonds season.

== Competitions ==
Competitions	Position
J.League 1	11th / 16 clubs
Emperor's Cup	3rd round
J.League Cup	Runners-up

== Domestic results ==
=== J.League 1 ===
Match	Date	Venue	Opponents	Score
1-1	2002.3.3	International Stadium Yokohama	Yokohama F. Marinos	0-1
1-2	2002.3.9	Saitama Stadium 2002	FC Tokyo	0-1
1-3	2002.3.16	Nihondaira Sports Stadium	Shimizu S-Pulse	1-2
1-4	2002.3.31	Osaka Expo '70 Stadium	Gamba Osaka	2-2 a.e.t.
1-5	2002.4.7	Urawa Komaba Stadium	Sanfrecce Hiroshima	4-1
1-6	2002.4.14	Miyagi Stadium	Vegalta Sendai	2-1 a.e.t. (sudden death)
1-7	2002.4.20	Tokyo Stadium	Tokyo Verdy 1969	1-2 a.e.t. (sudden death)
1-8	2002.7.13	Saitama Stadium 2002	Júbilo Iwata	2-3 a.e.t. (sudden death)
1-9	2002.7.20	National Olympic Stadium (Tokyo)	Consadole Sapporo	2-1 a.e.t. (sudden death)
1-10	2002.7.24	National Olympic Stadium (Tokyo)	Kashiwa Reysol	2-1
1-11	2002.7.27	Urawa Komaba Stadium	Kyoto Purple Sanga	1-3
1-12	2002.8.4	Kobe Universiade Memorial Stadium	Vissel Kobe	2-0
1-13	2002.8.7	Urawa Komaba Stadium	Kashima Antlers	0-2
1-14	2002.8.10	Mizuho Athletic Stadium	Nagoya Grampus Eight	1-2
1-15	2002.8.17	Urawa Komaba Stadium	JEF United Ichihara	1-2
2-1	2002.8.31	Hiroshima Big Arch	Sanfrecce Hiroshima	2-1 a.e.t. (sudden death)
2-2	2002.9.8	Saitama Stadium 2002	Vegalta Sendai	1-0 a.e.t. (sudden death)
2-3	2002.9.14	Yamaha Stadium	Júbilo Iwata	2-1
2-4	2002.9.18	Urawa Komaba Stadium	Kashiwa Reysol	1-1 a.e.t.
2-5	2002.9.21	Sapporo Dome	Consadole Sapporo	2-1
2-6	2002.9.28	Saitama Stadium 2002	Shimizu S-Pulse	2-1 a.e.t. (sudden death)
2-7	2002.10.5	Urawa Komaba Stadium	Vissel Kobe	3-0
2-8	2002.10.12	Nishikyogoku Athletic Stadium	Kyoto Purple Sanga	4-1
2-9	2002.10.19	Saitama Stadium 2002	Nagoya Grampus Eight	2-1 a.e.t. (sudden death)
2-10	2002.10.23	Kashima Soccer Stadium	Kashima Antlers	1-2
2-11	2002.10.27	Urawa Komaba Stadium	Tokyo Verdy 1969	0-1 a.e.t. (sudden death)
2-12	2002.11.9	National Olympic Stadium (Tokyo)	JEF United Ichihara	0-1
2-13	2002.11.16	Urawa Komaba Stadium	Gamba Osaka	0-1
2-14	2002.11.24	Tokyo Stadium	FC Tokyo	0-1 a.e.t. (sudden death)
2-15	2002.11.30	Urawa Komaba Stadium	Yokohama F. Marinos	0-1

=== Emperor's Cup ===
15 December 2002 Third round	Urawa Red Diamonds	1–2	Avispa Fukuoka	Saitama
	Nagai 16'	Report	Kawashima 66'; Miyahara 70'	Stadium: Saitama Stadium 2002; Attendance: 14,492

=== J.League Cup ===
Match	Date	Venue	Opponents	Score
GL-D-1	2002..			-
GL-D-2	2002..			-
GL-D-3	2002..			-
GL-D-4	2002..			-
GL-D-5	2002..			-
GL-D-6	2002..			-
Quarterfinals	2002..			-
Semifinals	2002..			-
Final	2002..			-

== International results ==
26 May 2002 International friendly	Urawa Red Diamonds	0–2	Paraguay	Matsumoto
		Report	Gavilán 28'; Alvarenga 52'	Stadium: Matsumotodaira Park Stadium

== Player statistics ==
No.	Pos.	Player	D.o.B. (Age)	Height / Weight	J.League 1		Emperor's Cup		J.League Cup		Total	
No.	Pos.	Player	D.o.B. (Age)	Height / Weight	Apps	Goals	Apps	Goals	Apps	Goals	Apps	Goals
1	GK	Yohei Nishibe	December 1, 1980 (aged 21)	cm / kg	5	0						
2	DF	Nobuhisa Yamada	September 10, 1975 (aged 26)	cm / kg	28	1						
3	DF	Masami Ihara	September 18, 1967 (aged 34)	cm / kg	28	0						
4	MF	Masaki Tsuchihashi	July 23, 1972 (aged 29)	cm / kg	3	0						
5	DF	Ichiei Muroi	June 22, 1974 (aged 27)	cm / kg	14	0						
6	MF	Toshiya Ishii	January 19, 1978 (aged 24)	cm / kg	10	1						
7	FW	Yuichiro Nagai	February 14, 1979 (aged 23)	cm / kg	19	4						
8	MF	Toshiyuki Abe	August 1, 1974 (aged 27)	cm / kg	4	0						
9	FW	Masahiro Fukuda	December 17, 1966 (aged 35)	cm / kg	27	3						
10	FW	Emerson	September 6, 1981 (aged 20)	cm / kg	24	15						
11	FW	Tuto	July 2, 1978 (aged 23)	cm / kg	23	9						
12	GK	Tomoyasu Ando	May 23, 1974 (aged 27)	cm / kg	0	0						
13	MF	Keita Suzuki	July 8, 1981 (aged 20)	cm / kg	26	1						
14	MF	Tomoyuki Yoshino	July 9, 1980 (aged 21)	cm / kg	0	0						
15	MF	Harison	January 2, 1980 (aged 22)	cm / kg	13	1						
16	MF	Takamasa Watanabe	May 12, 1977 (aged 24)	cm / kg	0	0						
17	MF	Ryuji Kawai	July 14, 1978 (aged 23)	cm / kg	0	0						
18	FW	Tatsuya Tanaka	November 27, 1982 (aged 19)	cm / kg	23	5						
19	DF	Hideki Uchidate	January 15, 1974 (aged 28)	cm / kg	30	1						
20	DF	Keisuke Tsuboi	September 16, 1979 (aged 22)	cm / kg	30	0						
21	GK	Norihiro Yamagishi	May 17, 1978 (aged 23)	cm / kg	26	0						
22	DF	Shinji Jojo	August 28, 1977 (aged 24)	cm / kg	3	0						
23	MF	Toru Chishima	May 11, 1981 (aged 20)	cm / kg	2	0						
24	DF	Tomonobu Hayakawa	July 11, 1977 (aged 24)	cm / kg	0	0						
25	MF	Nobumitsu Yamane	June 28, 1979 (aged 22)	cm / kg	0	0						
26	DF	Yuzo Minami	November 17, 1983 (aged 18)	cm / kg	0	0						
27	DF	Manabu Ikeda	July 3, 1980 (aged 21)	cm / kg	0	0						
28	DF	Tadaaki Hirakawa	May 1, 1979 (aged 22)	cm / kg	22	0						
29	DF	Satoshi Horinouchi	October 26, 1979 (aged 22)	cm / kg	0	0						
30	DF	Takuro Nishimura	August 15, 1977 (aged 24)	cm / kg	0	0						
31	DF	Takuya Mikami	February 13, 1980 (aged 22)	cm / kg	0	0						
32	MF	Makoto Hasebe	January 18, 1984 (aged 18)	cm / kg	0	0						
33	FW	Yosuke Kobayashi	May 6, 1983 (aged 18)	cm / kg	0	0						
34	FW	Akira Tokairin	July 8, 1983 (aged 18)	cm / kg	0	0						
35	DF	Ryuji Michiki	August 25, 1973 (aged 28)	cm / kg	10	0						
36	GK	Kenta Tokushige	March 9, 1984 (aged 17)	cm / kg	0	0						
38	DF	Ned Zelic	July 4, 1971 (aged 30)	cm / kg	1	0						

== Other pages ==
- (in Japanese) J. League official site
