= 2003 Urawa Red Diamonds season =

Urawa Red Diamonds
2003 season
- Manager: Hans Ooft
- Stadium: Saitama Stadium 2002
- J.League 1: 6th
- Emperor's Cup: 3rd Round
- J.League Cup: Champions
- Top goalscorer: Emerson (18)
Home colours	Away colours

2003 Urawa Red Diamonds season

== Competitions ==
Competitions	Position
J.League 1	6th / 16 clubs
Emperor's Cup	3rd round
J.League Cup	Champions

== Domestic results ==
=== J.League 1 ===
Match	Date	Venue	Opponents	Score
1-1	2003.3.22	Kashima Soccer Stadium	Kashima Antlers	1-3
1-2	2003.4.6	Urawa Komaba Stadium	Nagoya Grampus Eight	0-0
1-3	2003.4.12	Yamaha Stadium	Júbilo Iwata	0-1
1-4	2003.4.19	Urawa Komaba Stadium	Kyoto Purple Sanga	2-0
1-5	2003.4.26	Nagai Stadium	Cerezo Osaka	4-6
1-6	2003.4.29	National Olympic Stadium (Tokyo)	Tokyo Verdy 1969	2-0
1-7	2003.5.5	Saitama Stadium 2002	Shimizu S-Pulse	1-0
1-8	2003.5.11	Kobe Wing Stadium	Vissel Kobe	2-3
1-9	2003.5.17	Urawa Komaba Stadium	Gamba Osaka	4-4
1-10	2003.5.25	International Stadium Yokohama	Yokohama F. Marinos	1-0
1-11	2003.7.5	Urawa Komaba Stadium	Oita Trinita	2-1
1-12	2003.7.12	Saitama Stadium 2002	FC Tokyo	0-1
1-13	2003.7.20	Kashiwa no Ha Park Stadium	Kashiwa Reysol	1-1
1-14	2003.7.26	Saitama Stadium 2002	Vegalta Sendai	3-2
1-15	2003.8.2	National Olympic Stadium (Tokyo)	JEF United Ichihara	2-1
2-1	2003.8.16	Saitama Stadium 2002	Júbilo Iwata	3-1
2-2	2003.8.23	Nishikyogoku Athletic Stadium	Kyoto Purple Sanga	0-0
2-3	2003.8.30	Urawa Komaba Stadium	Vissel Kobe	2-0
2-4	2003.9.6	Osaka Expo '70 Stadium	Gamba Osaka	1-2
2-5	2003.9.13	Saitama Stadium 2002	Yokohama F. Marinos	0-3
2-6	2003.9.20	Ōita Stadium	Oita Trinita	3-1
2-7	2003.9.23	Urawa Komaba Stadium	JEF United Ichihara	2-2
2-8	2003.9.27	Miyagi Stadium	Vegalta Sendai	6-1
2-9	2003.10.4	Urawa Komaba Stadium	Cerezo Osaka	3-0
2-10	2003.10.18	Ajinomoto Stadium	FC Tokyo	1-1
2-11	2003.10.26	Saitama Stadium 2002	Kashiwa Reysol	0-0
2-12	2003.11.8	Urawa Komaba Stadium	Tokyo Verdy 1969	5-1
2-13	2003.11.15	Nihondaira Sports Stadium	Shimizu S-Pulse	0-1
2-14	2003.11.22	Mizuho Athletic Stadium	Nagoya Grampus Eight	1-4
2-15	2003.11.29	Saitama Stadium 2002	Kashima Antlers	2-2

=== Emperor's Cup ===
Match	Date	Venue	Opponents	Score
3rd round	2003..			-

=== J.League Cup ===
Match	Date	Venue	Opponents	Score
GL-A-1	2003..			-
GL-A-2	2003..			-
GL-A-3	2003..			-
GL-A-4	2003..			-
GL-A-5	2003..			-
GL-A-6	2003..			-
Quarterfinals-1	2003..			-
Quarterfinals-2	2003..			-
Semifinals-1	2003..			-
Semifinals-2	2003..			-
Final	2003..			-

== Player statistics ==
No.	Pos.	Player	D.o.B. (Age)	Height / Weight	J.League 1		Emperor's Cup		J.League Cup		Total	
No.	Pos.	Player	D.o.B. (Age)	Height / Weight	Apps	Goals	Apps	Goals	Apps	Goals	Apps	Goals
1	GK	Norihiro Yamagishi	May 17, 1978 (aged 24)	cm / kg	10	0						
2	DF	Keisuke Tsuboi	September 16, 1979 (aged 23)	cm / kg	30	1						
3	DF	Ned Zelic	July 4, 1971 (aged 31)	cm / kg	22	2						
4	MF	Masaki Tsuchihashi	July 23, 1972 (aged 30)	cm / kg	0	0						
5	DF	Ichiei Muroi	June 22, 1974 (aged 28)	cm / kg	18	1						
6	DF	Nobuhisa Yamada	September 10, 1975 (aged 27)	cm / kg	27	3						
7	FW	Edmundo	April 2, 1971 (aged 31)	cm / kg	0	0						
8	MF	Koji Yamase	September 22, 1981 (aged 21)	cm / kg	24	6						
9	FW	Yuichiro Nagai	February 14, 1979 (aged 24)	cm / kg	23	8						
10	FW	Emerson	September 6, 1981 (aged 21)	cm / kg	25	18						
11	FW	Tatsuya Tanaka	November 27, 1982 (aged 20)	cm / kg	26	11						
12	DF	Takuya Mikami	February 13, 1980 (aged 23)	cm / kg	4	0						
13	MF	Keita Suzuki	July 8, 1981 (aged 21)	cm / kg	29	1						
14	DF	Tadaaki Hirakawa	May 1, 1979 (aged 23)	cm / kg	30	1						
15	MF	Toru Chishima	May 11, 1981 (aged 21)	cm / kg	8	0						
16	GK	Yohei Nishibe	December 1, 1980 (aged 22)	cm / kg	0	0						
17	MF	Makoto Hasebe	January 18, 1984 (aged 19)	cm / kg	28	2						
18	DF	Takuro Nishimura	August 15, 1977 (aged 25)	cm / kg	0	0						
19	DF	Hideki Uchidate	January 15, 1974 (aged 29)	cm / kg	30	0						
20	DF	Satoshi Horinouchi	October 26, 1979 (aged 23)	cm / kg	6	0						
21	GK	Kenta Tokushige	March 9, 1984 (aged 18)	cm / kg	0	0						
22	DF	Shinji Jojo	August 28, 1977 (aged 25)	cm / kg	0	0						
23	GK	Ryōta Tsuzuki	April 18, 1978 (aged 24)	cm / kg	20	0						
24	FW	Yosuke Kobayashi	May 6, 1983 (aged 19)	cm / kg	0	0						
25	DF	Naoki Nakagawa	June 13, 1984 (aged 18)	cm / kg	0	0						
26	DF	Yuzo Minami	November 17, 1983 (aged 19)	cm / kg	0	0						
27	DF	Hiroyuki Kobayashi	April 18, 1980 (aged 22)	cm / kg	3	0						
28	GK	Nobuhiro Kato	December 11, 1984 (aged 18)	cm / kg	0	0						
29	DF	Yuriy Nikiforov	September 16, 1970 (aged 32)	cm / kg	12	0						

== Other pages ==
- (in Japanese) J. League official site
