= 2004 Urawa Red Diamonds season =

Urawa Red Diamonds
2004 season
- Manager: Guido Buchwald
- Stadium: Saitama Stadium 2002
- J. League 1: Runners-up
- Emperor's Cup: Semifinals
- J. League Cup: Runners-up
- Top goalscorer: Emerson (27)
Home colours	Away colours

During the 2004 season, Urawa Red Diamonds competed in the J. League 1, in which they finished as runners-up.

== Competitions ==
Competitions	Position
J. League 1	Runners-up / 16 clubs
Emperor's Cup	Semifinals
J. League Cup	Runners-up

== Domestic results ==
=== J. League 1 ===
Match	Date	Venue	Opponents	Score
1-1	2004.3.13	International Stadium Yokohama	Yokohama F. Marinos	1-1
1-2	2004.3.21	Saitama Stadium 2002	Cerezo Osaka	4-2
1-3	2004.4.3	Yamaha Stadium	Júbilo Iwata	3-1
1-4	2004.4.10	Urawa Komaba Stadium	Vissel Kobe	2-1
1-5	2004.4.14	Nihondaira Sports Stadium	Shimizu S-Pulse	4-3
1-6	2004.4.18	Urawa Komaba Stadium	Oita Trinita	4-1
1-7	2004.5.2	Hiroshima Big Arch	Sanfrecce Hiroshima	0-0
1-8	2004.5.5	Saitama Stadium 2002	Kashima Antlers	1-0
1-9	2004.5.9	Niigata Stadium	Albirex Niigata	0-3
1-10	2004.5.15	Urawa Komaba Stadium	JEF United Ichihara	3-3
1-11	2004.5.22	Ajinomoto Stadium	Tokyo Verdy 1969	1-3
1-12	2004.6.12	Toyota Stadium	Nagoya Grampus Eight	3-0
1-13	2004.6.16	Urawa Komaba Stadium	Kashiwa Reysol	1-1
1-14	2004.6.20	Okayama Stadium	Gamba Osaka	3-2
1-15	2004.6.26	Saitama Stadium 2002	FC Tokyo	2-1
2-1	2004.8.14	Kobe Universiade Memorial Stadium	Vissel Kobe	2-3
2-2	2004.8.21	Saitama Stadium 2002	Tokyo Verdy 1969	7-2
2-3	2004.8.29	Saitama Stadium 2002	Júbilo Iwata	3-2
2-4	2004.9.12	Oita Stadium	Oita Trinita	1-4
2-5	2004.9.18	Saitama Stadium 2002	Albirex Niigata	4-1
2-6	2004.9.23	Ajinomoto Stadium	FC Tokyo	1-0
2-7	2004.9.26	Urawa Komaba Stadium	Gamba Osaka	2-1
2-8	2004.10.2	National Stadium	JEF United Ichihara	0-4
2-9	2004.10.17	Saitama Stadium 2002	Yokohama F. Marinos	0-0
2-10	2004.10.23	Kashima Soccer Stadium	Kashima Antlers	2-3
2-11	2004.10.30	Osaka Nagai Stadium	Cerezo Osaka	0-2
2-12	2004.11.6	Saitama Stadium 2002	Shimizu S-Pulse	2-1
2-13	2004.11.20	Urawa Komaba Stadium	Nagoya Grampus Eight	1-2
2-14	2004.11.23	Hitachi Kashiwa Soccer Stadium	Kashiwa Reysol	0-4
2-15	2004.11.28	Saitama Stadium 2002	Sanfrecce Hiroshima	1-0

=== Emperor's Cup ===
Match	Date	Venue	Opponents	Score
4th Round	2004.11.14	Hakatanomori Athletic Stadium	Avispa Fukuoka	1-3
5th Round	2004.12.17	Okayama Stadium	Shonan Bellmare	3-0
Quarterfinals	2004.12.19	Saitama Stadium 2002	FC Tokyo	2-1
Semifinals	2004.12.25	National Stadium	Júbilo Iwata	2-1

=== J. League Cup ===
Match	Date	Venue	Opponents	Score
GL-C-1	2004.3.27	Urawa Komaba Stadium	Oita Trinita	2-3
GL-C-2	2004.4.29	Nihondaira Sports Stadium	Shimizu S-Pulse	2-0
GL-C-3	2004.5.29	Oita Stadium	Oita Trinita	0-3
GL-C-4	2004.6.5	Urawa Komaba Stadium	Shimizu S-Pulse	3-0
GL-C-5	2004.7.17	Urawa Komaba Stadium	JEF United Ichihara	2-1
GL-C-6	2004.7.24	Matsumotodaira Park Stadium	JEF United Ichihara	1-2
Quarterfinals	2004.9.4	Saitama Stadium 2002	Yokohama F. Marinos	3-2
Semifinals	2004.10.11	Mizuho Athletic Stadium	Nagoya Grampus Eight	1-4
Final	2004.11.3	National Stadium	FC Tokyo	0-0 a.e.t. (4-2 pen.)

== Player statistics ==
No.	Pos.	Player	D.o.B. (Age)	Height / Weight	J. League 1		Emperor's Cup		J. League Cup		Total	
No.	Pos.	Player	D.o.B. (Age)	Height / Weight	Apps	Goals	Apps	Goals	Apps	Goals	Apps	Goals
1	GK	Norihiro Yamagishi	May 17, 1978 (aged 25)	cm / kg	11	0						
2	DF	Keisuke Tsuboi	September 16, 1979 (aged 24)	cm / kg	14	0						
3	DF	Yuriy Nikiforov	September 16, 1970 (aged 33)	cm / kg	0	0						
3	DF	Alpay Özalan	May 29, 1973 (aged 30)	cm / kg	10	0						
4	DF	Marcus Tulio Tanaka	April 24, 1981 (aged 22)	cm / kg	21	3						
5	DF	Ichiei Muroi	June 22, 1974 (aged 29)	cm / kg	12	1						
6	DF	Nobuhisa Yamada	September 10, 1975 (aged 28)	cm / kg	27	2						
7	MF	Tomoyuki Sakai	June 29, 1979 (aged 24)	cm / kg	19	1						
8	MF	Koji Yamase	September 22, 1981 (aged 22)	cm / kg	18	5						
9	FW	Yuichiro Nagai	February 14, 1979 (aged 25)	cm / kg	27	6						
10	FW	Emerson	September 6, 1981 (aged 22)	cm / kg	26	27						
11	FW	Tatsuya Tanaka	November 27, 1982 (aged 21)	cm / kg	23	10						
12	DF	Takuya Mikami	February 13, 1980 (aged 24)	cm / kg	1	0						
13	MF	Keita Suzuki	July 8, 1981 (aged 22)	cm / kg	25	0						
14	DF	Tadaaki Hirakawa	May 1, 1979 (aged 24)	cm / kg	22	1						
15	MF	Toru Chishima	May 11, 1981 (aged 22)	cm / kg	1	0						
16	MF	Alessandro Santos	July 20, 1977 (aged 26)	cm / kg	27	2						
17	MF	Makoto Hasebe	January 18, 1984 (aged 20)	cm / kg	27	5						
18	DF	Takuro Nishimura	August 15, 1977 (aged 26)	cm / kg	0	0						
19	DF	Hideki Uchidate	January 15, 1974 (aged 30)	cm / kg	26	0						
20	DF	Satoshi Horinouchi	October 26, 1979 (aged 24)	cm / kg	9	0						
21	GK	Kenta Tokushige	March 9, 1984 (aged 20)	cm / kg	0	0						
22	DF	Hiroyuki Kobayashi	April 18, 1980 (aged 23)	cm / kg	1	0						
23	GK	Ryōta Tsuzuki	April 18, 1978 (aged 25)	cm / kg	19	0						
24	FW	Naoya Umeda	April 27, 1978 (aged 25)	cm / kg	0	0						
25	DF	Naoki Nakagawa	June 13, 1984 (aged 19)	cm / kg	0	0						
26	DF	Yuzo Minami	November 17, 1983 (aged 20)	cm / kg	0	0						
27	FW	Takuya Yokoyama	June 29, 1985 (aged 18)	cm / kg	2	0						
28	GK	Nobuhiro Kato	December 11, 1984 (aged 19)	cm / kg	0	0						
29	MF	Shota Arai	April 7, 1985 (aged 18)	cm / kg	0	0						
30	FW	Masayuki Okano	July 25, 1972 (aged 31)	cm / kg	15	1						
33	DF	Nenê	June 6, 1975 (aged 28)	cm / kg	10	1						
34	MF	Shunsuke Oyama	April 6, 1986 (aged 17)	cm / kg	1	0						

== Other pages ==
- (in Japanese) J. League official site
