= Keita Suzuki (footballer, born 1981) =

Japanese association football player

Keita Suzuki 鈴木 啓太
Personal information
- Full name: Keita Suzuki
- Date of birth: 8 July 1981 (age 45)
- Place of birth: Shizuoka, Shizuoka, Japan
- Height: 1.77 m (5 ft 9 1/2 in)
- Position: Midfielder

Youth career
- Shimizu FC
- Tokai University Daiichi Junior High School
- 1997–1999: Tokai University Daiichi High School

Senior career*
Years	Team	Apps	(Gls)
2000–2015	Urawa Reds	379	(10)

International career
2006–2008	Japan	28	(0)
Medal record
Urawa Reds
Winner	AFC Champions League	2007
Winner	J1 League	2006
Runner-up	J1 League	2004
Runner-up	J1 League	2005
Runner-up	J1 League	2007
Runner-up	J1 League	2014
Winner	J.League Cup	2003
Runner-up	J.League Cup	2002
Runner-up	J.League Cup	2004
Runner-up	J.League Cup	2011
Runner-up	J.League Cup	2013
Winner	Emperor's Cup	2005
Winner	Emperor's Cup	2006
Runner-up	Emperor's Cup	2015
Representing Japan
Asian Games
Silver medal – second place	2002 Busan	Team
- * Club domestic league appearances and goals

Keita Suzuki (鈴木 啓太, Suzuki Keita; born 8 July 1981) is a former Japanese football player. He played for the Japan national team.

He is a cousin of Koki Mizuno. His wife is Japanese actress Hiroko Hatano.

== Club career ==
After graduating from Tokai University Shoyo High School, he joined J2 League side Urawa Reds in 2000. His first professional appearance came in an Emperor's Cup match against Honda Lock SC on 3 December 2000. He broke into Urawa's first team in 2001 and became a mainstay in midfielder. He contributed to the club winning the J1 League championship in 2006 and was chosen as one of the 2006 J.League Best XI. In 2007, the club won the champions AFC Champions League and the 3rd place Club World Cup. He was also elected Japanese Footballer of the Year award. Although he played many matches every seasons, he lost opportunity to play in 2015. In October, he announced that he would be leaving his only club at the end of that season. After the last game of 2015 regular season in November, he announced his retirement from football.

== National team career ==
Suzuki was captain for Japan U-23 national team throughout the 2004 Summer Olympics Qualifiers. However, he was not included in the final squad for the 2004 Summer Olympics as manager Masakuni Yamamoto favoured overage player Shinji Ono.

Japan national team manager Ivica Osim rated Suzuki highly and handed him his first senior cap on 9 August 2006, in a friendly match against Trinidad and Tobago. He was the only player who started all 20 matches under Osim's reign. Osim once referred to him as the Japanese answer to Claude Makélélé. He played 28 games for Japan until 2008.

== Club statistics ==
Club	Season	League		Emperor's Cup		J.League Cup		Champions League		Other^{1}		Total	
Club	Season	Apps	Goals	Apps	Goals	Apps	Goals	Apps	Goals	Apps	Goals	Apps	Goals
Urawa Reds	2000	0	0	2	1	0	0	-		-		2	1
Urawa Reds	2001	15	1	4	0	2	0	-		-		21	1
Urawa Reds	2002	26	1	1	0	4	1	-		-		31	2
Urawa Reds	2003	29	1	1	0	10	1	-		-		40	2
Urawa Reds	2004	25	0	4	0	8	0	-		2	0	39	0
Urawa Reds	2005	29	0	4	0	6	2	-		-		39	2
Urawa Reds	2006	31	1	5	0	6	0	-		1	0	43	1
Urawa Reds	2007	33	1	1	0	0	0	12	0	5	0	51	1
Urawa Reds	2008	23	0	2	0	1	0	1	0	-		27	0
Urawa Reds	2009	32	1	1	0	7	0	-		-		40	1
Urawa Reds	2010	17	0	3	0	5	0	-		-		25	0
Urawa Reds	2011	26	1	2	0	6	0	-		-		34	1
Urawa Reds	2012	31	2	3	0	2	0	-		-		36	2
Urawa Reds	2013	30	0	0	0	4	0	4	0	-		38	0
Urawa Reds	2014	28	1	1	1	3	0	-		-		32	2
Urawa Reds	2015	4	0	0	0	0	0	5	0	1	0	10	0
Career total		379	10	34	2	64	4	22	0	9	0	508	16

^{1}Includes J.League Championship, Japanese Super Cup, A3 Champions Cup and FIFA Club World Cup.

== National team statistics ==
National team	Year	Apps	Goals
Japan U-23
Japan U-23	2002	6	1
Japan U-23	2003	8	0
Japan U-23	2004	12	1
Japan U-23	Total	26	2
Japan
Japan	2006	7	0
Japan	2007	13	0
Japan	2008	8	0
Japan	Total	28	0

=== Appearances in major competitions ===
Team	Competition	Category	Appearances		Goals	Team record
Team	Competition	Category	Start	Sub	Goals	Team record
Japan U-23	2004 Summer Olympics Qualifiers	U-22~23	6	1	1	Qualified
Japan	2007 AFC Asian Cup qualification	Senior	5	0	0	Qualified
Japan	2007 AFC Asian Cup	Senior	6	0	0	4th place
Japan	2010 FIFA World Cup qualification	Senior	2	0	0	Qualified

=== International goals ===
Scores and results list Japan's goal tally first.

==== Under-23 ====
#	Date	Venue	Opponent	Score	Result	Competition
1.	10 October 2002	Munsu Cup Stadium, Ulsan, South Korea	Thailand	2–0	3–0	2002 Asian Games
2.	3 March 2004	Al Jazira Stadium, Abu Dhabi, UAE	Lebanon	2–0	4–0	2004 Summer Olympics Qualifiers

== Honours ==
=== Japan ===
- Afro-Asian Cup of Nations: 1

2007

=== Club ===
Urawa Red Diamonds

- J1 League: 1

2006

- J1 League First Stage: 1

2015

- Emperor's Cup: 2

2005, 2006

- J.League Cup: 1

2003

- AFC Champions League: 1

2007

- Japanese Super Cup: 1

2006

=== Individual ===
- Japanese Footballer of the Year: 1

2007

- J.League Best XI: 2

2006, 2007
