= Hideki Uchidate =

Japanese footballer

Hideki Uchidate 内舘 秀樹
Personal information
- Full name: Hideki Uchidate
- Date of birth: January 15, 1974 (age 52)
- Place of birth: Saitama, Japan
- Height: 1.80 m (5 ft 11 in)
- Position: Defender

Youth career
- 1989–1991: Urawa Kita High School
- 1992–1995: Sendai University

Senior career*
Years	Team	Apps	(Gls)
1996–2008	Urawa Reds	220	(4)
Total		220	(4)
Medal record
Urawa Reds
Winner	AFC Champions League	2007
Winner	J1 League	2006
Runner-up	J1 League	2004
Runner-up	J1 League	2005
Runner-up	J1 League	2007
Winner	J.League Cup	2003
Runner-up	J.League Cup	2002
Runner-up	J.League Cup	2004
Winner	Emperor's Cup	2005
Winner	Emperor's Cup	2006
- * Club domestic league appearances and goals

Hideki Uchidate (内舘 秀樹, Uchidate Hideki; born January 15, 1974) is a former Japanese football player.

== Playing career ==
Uchidate was born in Saitama on January 15, 1974. After graduating from Sendai University, he joined his local club Urawa Reds in 1996. He played many matches from 2000 and he became a regular player as left defender of three back defense and defensive midfielder from 2002. The club won the champions 2003 J.League Cup and 2005 Emperor's Cup. In 2006, although he played as substitute, he played many matches and the club won the champions J1 League. From 2007, although his opportunity to play decreased, the club won the champions AFC Champions League. He retired at the end of the 2008 season.

== Club statistics ==
Club performance			League		Cup		League Cup		Continental		Total	
Season	Club	League	Apps	Goals	Apps	Goals	Apps	Goals	Apps	Goals	Apps	Goals
Japan			League		Emperor's Cup		J.League Cup		Asia		Total	
1996	Urawa Reds	J1 League	5	0	3	0	0	0	-		8	0
1997	Urawa Reds	J1 League	11	0	0	0	2	0	-		13	0
1998	Urawa Reds	J1 League	0	0	0	0	0	0	-		0	0
1999	Urawa Reds	J1 League	9	0	2	0	1	0	-		12	0
2000	Urawa Reds	J2 League	28	3	1	0	1	0	-		30	3
2001	Urawa Reds	J1 League	18	0	1	0	6	0	-		25	0
2002	Urawa Reds	J1 League	30	1	1	0	9	0	-		40	1
2003	Urawa Reds	J1 League	30	0	1	0	10	0	-		41	0
2004	Urawa Reds	J1 League	26	0	3	0	7	0	-		36	0
2005	Urawa Reds	J1 League	26	0	1	0	9	0	-		36	0
2006	Urawa Reds	J1 League	23	0	5	0	8	0	-		36	0
2007	Urawa Reds	J1 League	11	0	1	0	2	0	3	0	17	0
2008	Urawa Reds	J1 League	3	0	0	0	2	1	-		5	1
Total			220	4	19	0	57	1	3	0	299	5
