= Nobuhiro Kato =

Japanese footballer

Nobuhiro Kato 加藤 順大
Personal information
- Full name: Nobuhiro Kato
- Date of birth: 11 December 1984 (age 41)
- Place of birth: Ageo, Saitama, Japan
- Height: 1.80 m (5 ft 11 in)
- Position: Goalkeeper

Youth career
- 2000–2002: Urawa Reds

Senior career*
Years	Team	Apps	(Gls)
2003–2014	Urawa Reds	85	(0)
2015–2018	Omiya Ardija	77	(0)
2019–2020	Kyoto Sanga FC	15	(0)
Total		177	(0)
Medal record
Urawa Reds
Winner	AFC Champions League	2007
Winner	J1 League	2006
Runner-up	J1 League	2004
Runner-up	J1 League	2005
Runner-up	J1 League	2007
Runner-up	J1 League	2014
Winner	J.League Cup	2003
Runner-up	J.League Cup	2004
Runner-up	J.League Cup	2011
Runner-up	J.League Cup	2013
Winner	Emperor's Cup	2005
Winner	Emperor's Cup	2006
- * Club domestic league appearances and goals as of end of 2018 season

Nobuhiro Kato (加藤 順大, Katō Nobuhiro; born 11 December 1984) is a Japanese former professional footballer who played as a goalkeeper.

== Playing career ==
Kato was born in Ageo on 11 December 1984. He joined J1 League club Urawa Reds from youth team in 2003. Although Reds won the many title 2006 J1 League, 2007 AFC Champions League and so on, he could hardly play in the match behind Ryota Tsuzuki and Norihiro Yamagishi until 2010. He became a regular goalkeeper in 2011 and Reds won the 2nd place in 2011 and 2013 J.League Cup. However he lost his regular position behind Shusaku Nishikawa in 2014. In 2015, he moved to Saitama's cross town rivals, Omiya Ardija in J2 League. He played as regular goalkeeper and Ardija was promoted to J1 end of 2015 season. Although his opportunity to play decreased from 2016, he played many matches while battling with Hitoshi Shiota for the position. However Ardija finished at the bottom place in 2017 season and was relegated to J2. He could not play at all in the match behind Takashi Kasahara in 2018. In 2019, he moved to J2 club Kyoto Sanga FC.

== Club statistics ==
Appearances and goals by club, season and competition
Club	Season	League			Emperor's Cup		J.League Cup		AFC		Total	
Club	Season	Division	Apps	Goals	Apps	Goals	Apps	Goals	Apps	Goals	Apps	Goals
Urawa Reds	2003	J1 League	0	0	0	0	0	0	-		0	0
Urawa Reds	2004	J1 League	0	0	0	0	0	0	-		0	0
Urawa Reds	2005	J1 League	0	0	0	0	0	0	-		0	0
Urawa Reds	2006	J1 League	0	0	0	0	1	0	-		1	0
Urawa Reds	2007	J1 League	0	0	0	0	0	0	0	0	0	0
Urawa Reds	2008	J1 League	0	0	0	0	1	0	0	0	1	0
Urawa Reds	2009	J1 League	0	0	0	0	0	0	-		0	0
Urawa Reds	2010	J1 League	0	0	0	0	6	0	-		6	0
Urawa Reds	2011	J1 League	26	0	1	0	5	0	-		32	0
Urawa Reds	2012	J1 League	34	0	2	0	3	0	-		39	0
Urawa Reds	2013	J1 League	25	0	1	0	2	0	6	0	34	0
Urawa Reds	2014	J1 League	0	0	0	0	6	0	-		6	0
Urawa Reds	Total		85	0	4	0	24	0	0	0	119	0
Omiya Ardija	2015	J2 League	37	0	2	0	-		-		39	0
Omiya Ardija	2016	J1 League	19	0	0	0	2	0	-		21	0
Omiya Ardija	2017	J1 League	21	0	2	0	3	0	-		26	0
Omiya Ardija	2018	J2 League	0	0	0	0	-		-		0	0
Omiya Ardija	Total		77	0	4	0	5	0	0	0	86	0
Kyoto Sanga FC	2019	J2 League	15	0	1	0	-		-		16	0
Kyoto Sanga FC	2020	J2 League	0	0	0	0	-		-		0	0
Kyoto Sanga FC	Total		15	0	1	0	0	0	0	0	16	0
Career total			177	0	9	0	29	0	6	0	221	0

== Honours ==
=== Club ===
Urawa Reds

- J1 League: 1

2006

- Emperor's Cup: 2

2005, 2006

- J.League Cup: 1

2003

- AFC Champions League: 1

2007

- Japanese Super Cup: 1

2006

Omiya Ardija

- J2 League: 1

2015
