= Tadaaki Hirakawa =

Japanese footballer

Tadaaki Hirakawa 平川 忠亮
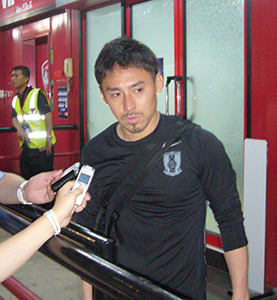

Personal information
- Full name: Tadaaki Hirakawa
- Date of birth: 1 May 1979 (age 47)
- Place of birth: Shizuoka, Shizuoka, Japan
- Height: 1.72 m (5 ft 7 1/2 in)
- Positions: Defender; midfielder

Team information
- Current team: FC Ryukyu (manager)

Youth career
- 1995–1997: Shimizu Commercial High School

College career
Years	Team	Apps	(Gls)
1998–2001	University of Tsukuba		

Senior career*
Years	Team	Apps	(Gls)
2002–2018	Urawa Red Diamonds	336	(9)
Total		336	(9)

Managerial career
- 2025–: FC Ryukyu
Medal record
Urawa Red Diamonds
Winner	AFC Champions League	2007
Winner	AFC Champions League	2017
Winner	J1 League	2006
Runner-up	J1 League	2004
Runner-up	J1 League	2005
Runner-up	J1 League	2007
Runner-up	J1 League	2014
Runner-up	J1 League	2016
Winner	J.League Cup	2003
Winner	J.League Cup	2016
Runner-up	J.League Cup	2002
Runner-up	J.League Cup	2004
Runner-up	J.League Cup	2011
Runner-up	J.League Cup	2013
Winner	Emperor's Cup	2005
Winner	Emperor's Cup	2006
Winner	Emperor's Cup	2018
Runner-up	Emperor's Cup	2015
- * Club domestic league appearances and goals

Tadaaki Hirakawa (平川 忠亮, Hirakawa Tadaaki; born 1 May 1979) is a former Japanese footballer. He is the current manager of J3 League club FC Ryukyu.

== Playing career ==
Hirakawa was born in Shizuoka on 1 May 1979. After graduating from University of Tsukuba, he joined J1 League club Urawa Reds in 2002. Although he is originally a right side player, he became a regular in the line-up as a left side midfielder from July. The Urawa Reds won the 2003 J.League Cup for the first time in the club history.

In 2004, the Urawa Reds signed Alessandro Santos and Hirakawa lost his place in the team. So, Hirakawa played many positions, including three positions in defence, and as a right side midfielder in the 2004 season. However, his opportunity to play decreased following the summer of 2004.

In 2006, he became a regular in the line-up as a right side midfielder and the Urawa Reds won the J1 League for the first time in the club's history. In 2007, he failed to displace Nobuhisa Yamada, so he became a left side midfielder again, leading to the Urawa Reds winning the 2007 AFC Champions League.

In 2008, he played many matches as a right and left side midfielder. Although he could not play many matches in 2009 because of injury, he played regularly as a right and left side back in 2010. From 2012, he played many matches as a right side midfielder.

He then lost his place to young player Takahiro Sekine from 2015. He retired at the end of the 2018 season.

== Manager career ==
Hirakawa took over manager duties for FC Ryukyu, who play in the J3 Legue competition, from the 2025 season.

== Club statistics ==
Club	Season	League		Emperor's Cup		J.League Cup		AFC		Other^{*}		Total	
Club	Season	Apps	Goals	Apps	Goals	Apps	Goals	Apps	Goals	Apps	Goals	Apps	Goals
Urawa Red Diamonds	2002	22	0	0	0	7	0	-		-		29	0
Urawa Red Diamonds	2003	30	1	1	0	9	0	-		-		40	1
Urawa Red Diamonds	2004	22	1	4	0	9	0	-		2	0	37	1
Urawa Red Diamonds	2005	26	2	0	0	10	0	-		-		36	2
Urawa Red Diamonds	2006	28	1	4	0	8	1	-		-		40	2
Urawa Red Diamonds	2007	19	0	0	0	1	0	10	0	2	0	32	0
Urawa Red Diamonds	2008	31	1	2	0	2	0	4	0	-		39	1
Urawa Red Diamonds	2009	11	0	1	0	2	0	-		-		14	0
Urawa Red Diamonds	2010	26	0	3	0	3	0	-		-		32	0
Urawa Red Diamonds	2011	24	1	3	0	2	0	-		-		29	1
Urawa Red Diamonds	2012	31	1	3	0	1	0	-		-		35	1
Urawa Red Diamonds	2013	27	0	0	0	5	0	5	0	-		37	0
Urawa Red Diamonds	2014	25	1	0	0	4	0	-		-		29	1
Urawa Red Diamonds	2015	8	0	1	0	2	0	4	0	2	0	17	0
Urawa Red Diamonds	2016	0	0	0	0	1	0	1	0	0	0	2	0
Urawa Red Diamonds	2017	3	0	1	0	1	0	0	0	0	0	5	0
Urawa Red Diamonds	2018	3	0	0	0	0	0	-		-		3	0
Career total		336	9	23	0	67	1	24	0	6	0	456	10

^{*}Includes other competitive competitions, including the J.League Championship, Japanese Super Cup and FIFA Club World Cup.

== Awards and honours ==
=== Club ===
Urawa Red Diamonds

- J1 League: 1

2006

- Emperor's Cup: 2

2005, 2006

- J.League Cup: 2

2003, 2016

- AFC Champions League: 2

2017, 2007

- Japanese Super Cup: 1

2006
