= Keisuke Tsuboi =

Japanese footballer (born 1979)

Keisuke Tsuboi 坪井 慶介
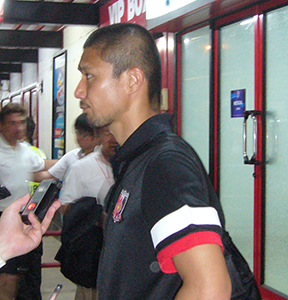

Personal information
- Full name: Keisuke Tsuboi
- Date of birth: 16 September 1979 (age 47)
- Place of birth: Tama, Tokyo, Japan
- Height: 1.79 m (5 ft 10 in)
- Position: Defender

Youth career
- 1995–1997: Yokkaichi Chuo Kogyo High School

College career
Years	Team	Apps	(Gls)
1998–2001	Fukuoka University		

Senior career*
Years	Team	Apps	(Gls)
2002–2014	Urawa Red Diamonds	292	(1)
2015–2017	Shonan Bellmare	28	(0)
2018–2019	Renofa Yamaguchi	28	(0)
Total		348	(1)

International career
2003–2007	Japan	40	(0)
Medal record
Urawa Red Diamonds
Winner	AFC Champions League	2007
Winner	J1 League	2006
Runner-up	J1 League	2004
Runner-up	J1 League	2005
Runner-up	J1 League	2007
Runner-up	J1 League	2014
Winner	J.League Cup	2003
Runner-up	J.League Cup	2002
Runner-up	J.League Cup	2004
Runner-up	J.League Cup	2011
Runner-up	J.League Cup	2013
Winner	Emperor's Cup	2005
Winner	Emperor's Cup	2006
- * Club domestic league appearances and goals

Keisuke Tsuboi (坪井 慶介, Tsuboi Keisuke; born 16 September 1979) is a Japanese former professional footballer who played as a defender.

== Club career ==
Tsuboi was educated at and played for Yokkaichi Chuo Kogyo High School and Fukuoka University.

After graduating from the university in 2002, he joined Urawa Red Diamonds and immediately broke into the first team. His first appearance came on 3 March 2002 against Yokohama F. Marinos in opening game in 2002 season. He scored his first league goal on 17 May 2003 against Gamba Osaka. He won the Rookie of the Year award in 2002 and was selected as one of the J.League Best Eleven in 2003. In 2006, Reds won the champions in J1 League which is first J1 champions in the club history. In 2007, Reds won first Asian title AFC Champions League. Although he played many matches as regular center back until 2010, he could not play many matches from 2011.

In 2015, Tsuboi moved to Shonan Bellmare. However he could not play many matches and Bellmare was relegated to J2 League end of 2016 season. In 2018, he moved to J2 club Renofa Yamaguchi FC.

== International career ==
Tsuboi represented Japan for the 2001 Summer Universiade held in Beijing where the team won the title beating Ukraine in the final.

Japan's national coach Zico gave him the first cap in 2003 when he played Tsuboi on 11 June 2003 in a friendly against Paraguay at Saitama Stadium. He was a member of the Japan team for 2006 FIFA World Cup where he played 2 games against Australia and Brazil. In Japan's first match against Australia, he suffered from cramps in his both thighs and had to be replaced by Teruyuki Moniwa in the 56th minute.

He was also in the squad for 2007 Asian Cup but did not play any game in the tournament as Yuki Abe and Yuji Nakazawa were the first-choice centre backs.

On 8 February 2008, he announced retirement from international football. He played 40 games for Japan until 2007.

== Away from football ==
He joined SASUKE 38 at December 2020. He failed Stage 1 at Dragon Glider.

== Career statistics ==
=== Club ===
Appearances and goals by club, season and competition
Club	Season	League		Emperor's Cup		League Cup		Champions League		Other (Note: Includes Japanese Super Cup and FIFA Club World Cup.)		Total	
Club	Season	Apps	Goals	Apps	Goals	Apps	Goals	Apps	Goals	Apps	Goals	Apps	Goals
Fukuoka University	1999	–		3	0	–		–		–		3	0
Urawa Red Diamonds	2002	30	0	1	0	8	0	–		–		39	0
Urawa Red Diamonds	2003	30	1	1	0	11	0	–		–		42	1
Urawa Red Diamonds	2004	14	0	1	0	0	0	–		–		15	0
Urawa Red Diamonds	2005	33	0	5	0	2	0	–		–		40	0
Urawa Red Diamonds	2006	27	0	2	0	1	0	–		1	0	31	0
Urawa Red Diamonds	2007	31	0	1	0	0	0	12	0	4	0	48	0
Urawa Red Diamonds	2008	21	0	2	0	6	0	4	0	–		33	0
Urawa Red Diamonds	2009	29	0	1	0	7	0	–		–		37	0
Urawa Red Diamonds	2010	31	0	4	0	3	0	–		–		38	0
Urawa Red Diamonds	2011	5	0	3	0	2	0	–		–		10	0
Urawa Red Diamonds	2012	33	0	1	0	1	0	–		–		35	0
Urawa Red Diamonds	2013	7	0	2	0	1	0	2	0	–		12	0
Urawa Red Diamonds	2014	1	0	1	0	1	0	–		–		3	0
Shonan Bellmare	2015	8	0	1	0	6	1	–		–		15	1
Shonan Bellmare	2016	15	0	1	0	4	0	–		–		20	0
Shonan Bellmare	2017	5	0	2	0	–		–		–		7	0
Renofa Yamaguchi	2018	23	0	1	0	–		–		–		24	0
Renofa Yamaguchi	2019	5	0	1	0	–		–		–		6	0
Career total		348	1	34	0	53	1	18	0	5	0	458	2

=== International ===
Appearances and goals by national team and year
National team	Year	Apps	Goals
Japan	2003	11	0
Japan	2004	10	0
Japan	2005	7	0
Japan	2006	11	0
Japan	2007	1	0
Total		40	0

== Honours ==
Urawa Reds

- J1 League: 2006
- Emperor's Cup: 2005, 2006
- J.League Cup: 2003
- AFC Champions League: 2007
- Japanese Super Cup: 2006

Shonan Bellmare

- J2 League: 2017

Individual

- J.League Best Eleven: 2003
- J.League Rookie of the Year: 2002
- J. League Cup New Hero Award: 2002
