= 2006 Urawa Red Diamonds season =

Urawa Red Diamonds
2006 season
- Manager: Guido Buchwald
- Stadium: Saitama Stadium 2002
- J.League 1: Champions
- Emperor's Cup: Champions
- J.League Cup: Quarterfinals
- Japanese Super Cup: Champions
- Top goalscorer: League: Washington (26); All: Washington (39)
- Highest home attendance: 62,241
- Lowest home attendance: 16,040
- Average home league attendance: 45,573
Home colours	Away colours

2006 Urawa Red Diamonds season

== Competitions ==
Competitions	Position
J.League 1	Champions / 18 clubs
Emperor's Cup	Champions
J.League Cup	Quarterfinals
Japanese Super Cup	Champions

== Domestic results ==
=== J.League 1 ===
Match	Date	Venue	Opponents	Score
1	2006.03.04	Osaka Expo '70 Stadium	Gamba Osaka	1-1
2	2006.03.11	Saitama Stadium	Júbilo Iwata	3-1
3	2006.03.18	Hiroshima Big Arch Stadium	Sanfrecce Hiroshima	4-1
4	2006.03.21	Saitama Stadium	Cerezo Osaka	3-0
5	2006.03.25	Nissan Stadium	Yokohama F. Marinos	3-1
6	2006.04.02	Saitama Stadium	Nagoya Grampus	0-0
7	2006.04.09	Hakatanomori Football Stadium	Avispa Fukuoka	1-0
8	2006.04.15	Saitama Stadium	Kyoto Sanga	3-0
9	2006.04.22	Shizuoka Stadium	Shimizu S-Pulse	1-2
10	2006.04.29	Saitama Stadium	Omiya Ardija	2-0
11	2006.05.03	Fukuda Denshi Arena	JEF United Chiba	0-2
12	2006.05.07	Saitama Stadium	Kashima Antlers	4-0
13	2006.07.19	Niigata Stadium	Albirex Niigata	1-2
14	2006.07.22	Todoroki Athletics Stadium	Kawasaki Frontale	2-0
15	2006.07.26	Urawa Komaba Stadium	Oita Trinita	1-0
16	2006.07.29	Kose Sports Stadium	Ventforet Kofu	1-1
17	2006.08.12	Saitama Stadium	FC Tokyo	4-0
18	2006.08.19	Kashima Soccer Stadium	Kashima Antlers	2-2
19	2006.08.23	Saitama Stadium	Albirex Niigata	3-1
20	2006.08.26	Nagai Stadium	Cerezo Osaka	2-1
21	2006.08.30	Kyushu Oil Dome	Oita Trinita	1-2
22	2006.09.10	Saitama Stadium	Omiya Ardija	2-0
23	2006.09.16	Saitama Stadium	Sanfrecce Hiroshima	2-1
24	2006.09.23	Saitama Stadium	Shimizu S-Pulse	1-0
25	2006.09.30	Nishikyogoku Athletic Stadium	Kyoto Sanga	5-1
26	2006.10.07	Saitama Stadium	JEF United Chiba	2-0
27	2006.10.15	Urawa Komaba Stadium	Avispa Fukuoka	2-1
28	2006.10.21	Saitama Stadium	Kawasaki Frontale	2-2
29	2006.10.28	Yamaha Stadium	Júbilo Iwata	2-3
30	2006.11.11	Saitama Stadium	Yokohama F. Marinos	1-0
31	2006.11.18	Toyota Stadium	Nagoya Grampus	0-1
32	2006.11.23	Saitama Stadium	Ventforet Kofu	3-0
33	2006.11.26	Ajinomoto Stadium	FC Tokyo	0-0
34	2006.12.02	Saitama Stadium	Gamba Osaka	3-2

=== Emperor's Cup ===
Match	Date	Venue	Opponents	Score
4th round	2006.11.04	Urawa Komaba Stadium	Shizuoka F.C.	5-0
5th round	2006.12.16	Saitama Stadium	Avispa Fukuoka	3-0 aet
Quarterfinals	2006.12.23	Saitama Stadium	Júbilo Iwata	3-3 aet (10-9p)
Semifinals	2006.12.29	Tokyo National Stadium	Kashima Antlers	2-1
Final	2007.01.01	Tokyo National Stadium	Gamba Osaka	1-0

=== J.League Cup ===
Match	Date	Venue	Opponents	Score
GL-A-1	2006.03.29	Urawa Komaba Stadium	FC Tokyo	2-0
GL-A-2	2006.04.12	Urawa Komaba Stadium	Avispa Fukuoka	3-1
GL-A-3	2006.04.26	Hakatanomori Football Stadium	Avispa Fukuoka	3-1
GL-A-4	2006.05.14	Nissan Stadium	Yokohama F. Marinos	2-1
GL-A-5	2006.05.17	Ajinomoto Stadium	FC Tokyo	0-0
GL-A-6	2006.05.21	Saitama Stadium	Yokohama F. Marinos	4-2
Quarterfinals-1	2006.06.03	Urawa Komaba Stadium	Kawasaki Frontale	4-3
Quarterfinals-2	2006.06.07	Todoroki Athletics Stadium	Kawasaki Frontale	1-2

=== Japanese Super Cup ===
Match	Date	Venue	Opponents	Score
Final	2006.02.25	Tokyo National Stadium	Gamba Osaka	3-1

== Player statistics ==
No.	Pos.	Player	D.o.B. (Age)	Height / Weight	J.League 1		Emperor's Cup		J.League Cup		Total	
No.	Pos.	Player	D.o.B. (Age)	Height / Weight	Apps	Goals	Apps	Goals	Apps	Goals	Apps	Goals
1	GK	Norihiro Yamagishi	May 17, 1978 (aged 27)	cm / kg	24	0						
2	DF	Keisuke Tsuboi	September 16, 1979 (aged 26)	cm / kg	27	0						
3	MF	Hajime Hosogai	June 10, 1986 (aged 19)	cm / kg	2	0						
4	DF	Marcus Tulio Tanaka	April 24, 1981 (aged 24)	cm / kg	33	7						
5	DF	Nenê	June 6, 1975 (aged 30)	cm / kg	9	0						
6	MF	Nobuhisa Yamada	September 10, 1975 (aged 30)	cm / kg	32	6						
7	MF	Tomoyuki Sakai	June 29, 1979 (aged 26)	cm / kg	3	0						
8	MF	Alex	July 20, 1977 (aged 28)	cm / kg	34	5						
9	FW	Yuichiro Nagai	February 14, 1979 (aged 27)	cm / kg	23	4						
10	MF	Robson Ponte	November 6, 1976 (aged 29)	cm / kg	22	4						
11	FW	Tatsuya Tanaka	November 27, 1982 (aged 23)	cm / kg	18	4						
12	FW	Teruaki Kurobe	March 6, 1978 (aged 27)	cm / kg	9	0						
13	MF	Keita Suzuki	July 8, 1981 (aged 24)	cm / kg	31	1						
14	DF	Tadaaki Hirakawa	May 1, 1979 (aged 26)	cm / kg	28	1						
15	MF	Toru Chishima	May 11, 1981 (aged 24)	cm / kg	0	0						
16	MF	Takahito Soma	December 10, 1981 (aged 24)	cm / kg	18	1						
17	MF	Makoto Hasebe	January 18, 1984 (aged 22)	cm / kg	32	2						
18	MF	Shinji Ono	September 27, 1979 (aged 26)	cm / kg	28	5						
19	DF	Hideki Uchidate	January 15, 1974 (aged 32)	cm / kg	23	0						
20	DF	Satoshi Horinouchi	October 26, 1979 (aged 26)	cm / kg	28	1						
21	FW	Washington	April 1, 1975 (aged 30)	cm / kg	26	26						
22	MF	Shunsuke Oyama	April 6, 1986 (aged 19)	cm / kg	0	0						
23	GK	Ryōta Tsuzuki	April 18, 1978 (aged 27)	cm / kg	11	0						
24	DF	Tetsushi Kondo	November 4, 1986 (aged 19)	cm / kg	0	0						
25	MF	Takafumi Akahoshi	May 27, 1986 (aged 19)	cm / kg	0	0						
26	DF	Yuzo Minami	November 17, 1983 (aged 22)	cm / kg	0	0						
27	FW	Takuya Yokoyama	June 29, 1985 (aged 20)	cm / kg	0	0						
28	GK	Nobuhiro Kato	December 11, 1984 (aged 21)	cm / kg	0	0						
29	MF	Shota Arai	April 7, 1985 (aged 20)	cm / kg	0	0						
30	FW	Masayuki Okano	July 25, 1972 (aged 33)	cm / kg	8	0						
31	FW	Yuya Nakamura	April 14, 1986 (aged 19)	cm / kg	0	0						
32	FW	Junki Koike	May 11, 1987 (aged 18)	cm / kg	0	0						
33	DF	Kazuya Sakamoto	September 2, 1987 (aged 18)	cm / kg	0	0						
34	FW	Sergio Escudero	September 1, 1988 (aged 17)	cm / kg	1	0						
35	DF	Yoshiya Nishizawa	June 13, 1987 (aged 18)	cm / kg	0	0						
36	DF	Shunsuke Tsutsumi	June 8, 1987 (aged 18)	cm / kg	0	0						

== Other pages ==
- (in Japanese) J.League official site
