= Ichiei Muroi =

Japanese footballer

Ichiei Muroi 室井 市衛
Personal information
- Full name: Ichiei Muroi
- Date of birth: June 22, 1974 (age 52)
- Place of birth: Saitama, Japan
- Height: 1.83 m (6 ft 0 in)
- Position: Defender

Youth career
- 1990–1992: Bunan High School

Senior career*
Years	Team	Apps	(Gls)
1993–1999	Kashima Antlers	46	(2)
2000–2004	Urawa Reds	69	(3)
2001	→Cerezo Osaka (loan)	10	(0)
2005	Vissel Kobe	10	(0)
2006–2007	Yokohama FC	17	(0)
Total		152	(5)
Medal record
Kashima Antlers
Winner	J1 League	1996
Winner	J1 League	1998
Runner-up	J1 League	1993
Runner-up	J1 League	1997
Winner	J.League Cup	1997
Runner-up	J.League Cup	1999
Winner	Emperor's Cup	1997
Runner-up	Emperor's Cup	1993
Urawa Reds
Runner-up	J1 League	2004
Winner	J.League Cup	2003
Runner-up	J.League Cup	2002
Runner-up	J.League Cup	2004
Cerezo Osaka
Runner-up	Emperor's Cup	2001
- * Club domestic league appearances and goals

Ichiei Muroi (室井 市衛, Muroi Ichiei; born June 22, 1974) is a former Japanese football player.

== Playing career ==
Muroi was born in Saitama on June 22, 1974. After graduating from high school, he joined Kashima Antlers in 1993. Although he could not become a regular player behind Yutaka Akita and Ryosuke Okuno, he played as an important substitute center back player. The club won the champions 1996, 1998 J1 League, 1997 J.League Cup and 1997 Emperor's Cup. In 2000, he moved to his local club Urawa Reds in J2 League. He played many matches and the club was promoted to J1 League. In 2001, he could hardly play in the match and he moved to Cerezo Osaka in July. However the club results were bad and was relegated to J2 League. In 2002, he returned to Urawa Reds. He played many matches and the club won the champions 2003 J.League Cup. In 2005, he moved to Vissel Kobe. However he could not play many matches and moved to Yokohama FC in 2006. He retired at the end of the 2007 season.

== Career statistics ==
Appearances and goals by club, season and competition
Club	Season	League			Emperor's Cup		J.League Cup		Total	
Club	Season	Division	Apps	Goals	Apps	Goals	Apps	Goals	Apps	Goals
Kashima Antlers	1993	J1 League	0	0	0	0	0	0	0	0
Kashima Antlers	1994	J1 League	0	0	0	0	0	0	0	0
Kashima Antlers	1995	J1 League	3	0	4	0	—		7	0
Kashima Antlers	1996	J1 League	14	1	0	0	14	1	28	2
Kashima Antlers	1997	J1 League	13	1	1	0	9	0	23	1
Kashima Antlers	1998	J1 League	8	0	4	1	4	0	16	1
Kashima Antlers	1999	J1 League	8	0	0	0	3	0	11	0
Urawa Reds	2000	J2 League	23	1	3	1	2	0	28	2
Urawa Reds	2001	J1 League	2	0	0	0	0	0	2	0
Cerezo Osaka	2001	J1 League	10	0	5	1	0	0	15	1
Urawa Reds	2002	J1 League	14	0	1	0	7	0	22	0
Urawa Reds	2003	J1 League	18	1	0	0	8	0	26	1
Urawa Reds	2004	J1 League	12	1	0	0	4	0	16	1
Vissel Kobe	2005	J1 League	10	0	0	0	5	0	15	0
Yokohama FC	2006	J2 League	8	0	1	0	—		9	0
Yokohama FC	2007	J1 League	9	0	0	0	1	0	10	0
Career total			152	5	19	3	57	1	228	9
