= Tomoyuki Sakai =

Japanese footballer (born 1979)

Tomoyuki Sakai 酒井 友之
Personal information
- Full name: Tomoyuki Sakai
- Date of birth: 29 June 1979 (age 47)
- Place of birth: Misato, Saitama, Japan
- Height: 1.70 m (5 ft 7 in)
- Position: Midfielder

Youth career
- 1995–1997: JEF United Ichihara

Senior career*
Years	Team	Apps	(Gls)
1997–2000	JEF United Ichihara	92	(3)
2001–2003	Nagoya Grampus Eight	74	(5)
2004–2007	Urawa Reds	50	(3)
2007–2008	Vissel Kobe	10	(0)
2009	Fujieda MYFC	18	(3)
2010–2011	Pelita Jaya	11	(1)
2011	Persiwa Wamena	12	(0)
2011–2012	Persiram Raja Ampat	33	(2)
2013	Deltras Sidoarjo	0	(0)
Total		300	(17)

International career
1994–1995	Japan U-17	3	(0)
1998–1999	Japan U-20	7	(0)
2000	Japan U-23	4	(0)
2000	Japan	1	(0)
Medal record
JEF United Ichihara
Runner-up	J.League Cup	1998
Urawa Reds
Winner	AFC Champions League	2007
Winner	J1 League	2006
Runner-up	J1 League	2004
Runner-up	J1 League	2005
Runner-up	J1 League	2007
Runner-up	J.League Cup	2004
Winner	Emperor's Cup	2005
Winner	Emperor's Cup	2006
Representing Japan
FIFA U-20 World Cup
Silver medal – second place	1999 Nigeria
AFC U-19 Championship
Silver medal – second place	1998 Thailand
AFC U-16 Championship
Gold medal – first place	1994 Qatar
- * Club domestic league appearances and goals

Tomoyuki Sakai (酒井 友之, Sakai Tomoyuki; born 29 June 1979) is a former Japanese football player who played for Japan national team.

== Club career ==
Sakai was born in Misato on 29 June 1979. He joined JEF United Ichihara from youth team in 1997. He played many matches as defensive midfielder from first season. He moved to Nagoya Grampus Eight in 2001. He also played as right midfielder not only defensive midfielder. His opportunity to play decreased from the middle of 2003. He moved to Urawa Reds in 2004. Although he did not have much opportunity to play, the club won the 2nd place in 2004 and 2005 J1 League and the champions 2005 Emperor's Cup. He moved to Vissel Kobe in July 2007 and Fujieda MYFC in 2009. From 2010, he moved to Indonesia and played for Pelita Jaya, Persiwa Wamena, Persiram Raja Ampat and Deltras Sidoarjo. He retired in 2013.

== National team career ==
In August 1995, Sakai was selected Japan U-17 national team for 1995 U-17 World Championship. He played full-time in all 3 matches. In April 1999, he was also selected Japan U-20 national team for 1999 World Youth Championship. He played full-time in all 7 matches as right midfielder and Japan won the 2nd place.

In September 2000, Sakai was selected Japan U-23 national team for 2000 Summer Olympics who carried high hopes of the nation because Sakai's teammates included such household names as Hidetoshi Nakata, Shunsuke Nakamura and Naohiro Takahara. Sakai played all 4 matches. However, in the team's quarterfinal match, Sakai committed a foul inside his own box at the 90th minute, conceding the United States, Japan's opponents, a crucial penalty to make it 2-2. The United States went on to win the penalty shootouts after 120 minutes of play could not separate the two teams.

On 20 December 2000, Sakai debuted for Japan national team against South Korea.

== Club statistics ==
Japan			League		Emperor's Cup		J.League Cup		Total	
Season	Club	League	Apps	Goals	Apps	Goals	Apps	Goals	Apps	Goals
1997	JEF United Ichihara	J1 League	18	2	2	0	1	0	21	2
1998	JEF United Ichihara	J1 League	25	0	1	0	6	1	32	1
1999	JEF United Ichihara	J1 League	22	0	1	1	0	0	23	1
2000	JEF United Ichihara	J1 League	27	1	3	1	2	0	32	2
2001	Nagoya Grampus Eight	J1 League	25	3	1	0	6	0	32	3
2002	Nagoya Grampus Eight	J1 League	29	1	3	0	6	0	38	1
2003	Nagoya Grampus Eight	J1 League	17	1	0	0	3	0	20	1
2004	Urawa Reds	J1 League	19	1	3	0	7	1	29	2
2005	Urawa Reds	J1 League	18	2	4	0	6	0	28	2
2006	Urawa Reds	J1 League	3	0	3	0	5	1	11	1
2007	Urawa Reds	J1 League	0	0	0	0	0	0	0	0
2007	Vissel Kobe	J1 League	10	0	2	0	0	0	12	0
2008	Vissel Kobe	J1 League	0	0	0	0	0	0	0	0
2009	Fujieda MYFC	Prefectural Leagues	8	3	-		-		8	3
Indonesia			League		Piala Indonesia		League Cup		Total	
2010/11	Pelita Jaya	Super League	11	1	-		-		11	1
2010/11	Persiwa Wamena	Super League	12	0	-		-		12	0
2011/12	Persiram Raja Ampat	Super League	33	2	-		-		33	2
Country	Japan		221	14	23	2	42	3	286	19
Country	Indonesia		56	3	-		-		56	3
Total			277	17	23	2	42	3	342	22

== Honors and awards ==
=== Club honors ===
Urawa Reds

- J1 League (1): 2006
- Emperor's Cup (2): 2005, 2006

=== Country honors ===
- FIFA World Youth Championship runner-up: 1999
