= Gral =

Gral is a surname. Notable people with the surname include:

- Émilie Gral (born 1986), French paratriathlete, swimmer, and politician
- Rodrigo Gral (born 1977), Brazilian footballer

== See also ==
- Grall
