= 2012 Urawa Red Diamonds season =

Urawa Red Diamonds
2012 season
- Chairman: Mitsuo Hashimoto
- Manager: Mihailo Petrović
- J. League Division 1: –
- Emperor's Cup: –
- J. League Cup: –
Home colours	Away colours	Third colours

The 2012 Urawa Red Diamonds season was Urawa Red Diamonds' 12th consecutive season in J. League Division 1, and 46th overall in the Japanese top flight. Urawa Red Diamonds are also competing in the 2012 Emperor's Cup and 2012 J. League Cup.

== Competitions ==
=== J. League ===
==== League table ====
Pos	Team	Pld	W	D	L	GF	GA	GD	Pts	Qualification or relegation
1	Sanfrecce Hiroshima (C)	34	19	7	8	63	34	+29	64	Qualification to 2012 Club World Cup and 2013 Champions League
2	Vegalta Sendai	34	15	12	7	59	43	+16	57	Qualification to 2013 Champions League (Note: The winners of the 2012 Emperor's Cup qualified for the group stage of the 2013 AFC Champions League.)
3	Urawa Red Diamonds	34	15	10	9	47	42	+5	55	Qualification to 2013 Champions League
4	Yokohama F. Marinos	34	13	14	7	44	33	+11	53	
5	Sagan Tosu	34	15	8	11	48	39	+9	53	

Updated to match(es) played on 1 December 2012. Source: J.League Division 1
Rules for classification: 1) points; 2) goal difference; 3) number of goals scored.
(C) Champions

==== Matches ====
10 March 2012 1	Sanfrecce Hiroshima	1–0	Urawa Red Diamonds	Hiroshima Big Arch Stadium
Saturday 14:06	Sato 49'	Report		Attendance: 29,603; Referee: Matsuo

17 March 2012 2	Urawa Red Diamonds	1–0	Kashiwa Reysol	Saitama Stadium
Saturday 14:04	Despotović 36'	Report		Attendance: 41,069; Referee: Tojo

24 March 2012 3	Consadole Sapporo	1–2	Urawa Red Diamonds	Sapporo Dome
Saturday 16:03	Yamamoto 32'	Report	45+1', 63' Kashiwagi	Attendance: 20,192; Referee: Murakami

31 March 2012 4	Urawa Red Diamonds	1–1	Kawasaki Frontale	Saitama Stadium 2002
Saturday 15:03	Popó 10'	Report	59' Yajima	Attendance: 25,743; Referee: Iemoto

7 April 2012 5	Kashima Antlers	1–3	Urawa Red Diamonds	Kashima Soccer Stadium
18:00 JST – Japan Standard Time	Koroki 2'; Araiba (yellow card) 24'; Umebachi (yellow card) 27'; Endo (yellow card) 67'	Report	Marcio Richardes 3', 26' (pen.); Popó 5'; Kashiwagi (yellow card) 67'; Makino (yellow card) 84'	Attendance: 23,507; Referee: (Japan) Hiroyuki Kimura

14 April 2012 6	Urawa Red Diamonds	2–0	Vissel Kobe	Saitama Stadium 2002
16:00 JST – Japan Standard Time	Abe 53'; Marcio Richardes 77'	Report	Ōkubo (yellow card) 27'; Okui (yellow card) 42'	Attendance: 25,894; Referee: (Japan) Hiroyoshi Takayama

21 April 2012 7	Omiya Ardija	2–0	Urawa Red Diamonds	NACK5 Stadium Omiya
19:30 JST – Japan Standard Time	Cho Young-Cheol 8'; Rafael Mariano 27'	Report	Haraguchi (yellow card) 76'; Kashiwagi (yellow card) 86'	Attendance: 12,709; Referee: (Japan) Jumpei Iida

28 April 2012 8	Nagoya Grampus	1–2	Urawa Red Diamonds	Mizuho Athletic Stadium
14:00 JST	Kanazaki 27'; Tanaka (yellow card) 48' (yellow-red card) 67'; Ogawa (yellow card) 55'	Report	Marcio Richardes 23', 69' (pen.) (yellow card) 37'; Tsuboi (yellow card) 52'; Hamada (yellow card) 90'	Attendance: 18,138; Referee: (Japan) Kenji Ogiya

3 May 2012 9	Urawa Red Diamonds	1–2	Yokohama F. Marinos	Saitama Stadium 2002
20:00 JST	Kojima (yellow card) 58'; Makino 78'	Report	Saito 12'; Andrew Kumagai (yellow card) 17'; Nakazawa (yellow card) 67'; Ono (yellow card) 73'; Hyodo (yellow card) 76'; Marquinhos 88'	Attendance: 44,422; Referee: (Japan) Toshimitsu Yoshida

6 May 2012 10	Júbilo Iwata	2–2	Urawa Red Diamonds	Yamaha Stadium
17:00 JST	Baek Sung-Dong 25', 71' (yellow card) 43'	Report	Marcio Richardes (yellow card) 21'; Makino 52'; Haraguchi 66'	Attendance: 22,193; Referee: (Japan) Kazuhiko Matsumura

12 May 2012 11	Urawa Red Diamonds	1–1	Albirex Niigata	Saitama Stadium 2002
17:00 JST	Marcio Richardes 11'; Abe (yellow card) 84'	Report	Bruno Lopes 29' (yellow card) 36'; Kikuchi (yellow card) 45+2'; Tanaka (yellow card) 73'	Attendance: 31,818; Referee: (Japan) Ryuji Sato

19 May 2012 12	Urawa Red Diamonds	1–0	Shimizu S-Pulse	Saitama Stadium 2002
16:30 JST	Abe 42'; Umesaki (yellow card) 72'	Report	Brosque (yellow card) 20' (yellow-red card) 54'; Takagi (yellow card) 62'	Attendance: 35,877; Referee: (Japan) Yudai Yamamoto

26 May 2012 13	F.C. Tokyo	1–1	Urawa Red Diamonds	Ajinomoto Stadium
20:00 JST	Jang Hyun-Soo (yellow card) 33'; Morishige 90+1'	Report	Marcio Richardes 89'	Attendance: 33,836; Referee: (Japan) Toshimitsu Yoshida

16 June 2012 14	Gamba Osaka	1–2	Urawa Red Diamonds	Osaka Expo '70 Stadium
20:00 JST	Sato 16'	Report	Haraguchi 29'; Umesaki 90+2'	Attendance: 14,977; Referee: (Japan) Hiroyoshi Takayama

23 June 2012 15	Urawa Red Diamonds	0–0	Vegalta Sendai	Saitama Stadium 2002
20:00 JST	Ugajin (yellow card) 39'	Report		Attendance: 39,545; Referee: (Japan) Yuichi Nishimura

30 June 2012 16	Cerezo Osaka	1–1	Urawa Red Diamonds	Kincho Stadium
20:00 JST	Kakitani 90+1'	Report	Suzuki 20'; Marcio Richardes (yellow card) 80'; Kato (yellow card) 83'; Despotović (yellow card) 89'	Attendance: 36,723; Referee: (Japan) Masaaki Iemoto

7 July 2012 17	Urawa Red Diamonds	4–3	Sagan Tosu	Saitama Stadium 2002
19:00 JST	Umesaki 7'; Hirakawa 50'; Haraguchi 52', 54'	Report	Kim Kun-Hoan (yellow card) 45'; Fujita 67', 71'; Tozin 67'	Attendance: 30,047; Referee: (Japan) Itaru Hirose

14 July 2012 18	Albirex Niigata	0–0	Urawa Red Diamonds	Tohoku Electric Power Big Swan Stadium
20:00 JST	Tanaka (yellow card) 85'; Ohi (yellow card) 90'	Report	Hirakawa (yellow card) 16'; Umesaki (yellow card) 74'	Attendance: 33,998; Referee: (Japan) Hiroyoshi Takayama

28 July 2012 19	Urawa Red Diamonds	2–0	Júbilo Iwata	Saitama Stadium 2002
19:00 JST	Kashiwagi 36' (yellow card) 50'; Abe 78'	Report	Cho Byung-Kuk (yellow card) 44'; Kobayashi (yellow card) 66'	Attendance: 28,142; Referee: (Japan) Yudai Yamamoto

4 August 2012 20	Urawa Red Diamonds	2–2	F.C. Tokyo	Saitama Stadium 2002
19:00 JST	Ugajin 12'; Marcio Richardes 36'	Report	Mukuhara (yellow card) 3' (goal) 60'; Takahashi (yellow card) 63'; Hasegawa 72'; Kaga (yellow card) 81'	Attendance: 34,267; Referee: (Japan) Nobutsugu Murakami

11 August 2012 21	Vissel Kobe	1–0	Urawa Red Diamonds	Home's Stadium Kobe
20:00 JST	Ōkubo 23' (pen.); Ogawa (yellow card) 48' (yellow-red card) 63'	Report	Kato (yellow card) 22'; Marcio Richardes (yellow card) 80'	Attendance: 14,161; Referee: (Japan) Jumpei Iida

18 August 2012 22	Urawa Red Diamonds	2–1	Kashima Antlers	Saitama Stadium 2002
20:00 JST	Ugajin 26'; Haraguchi 39'	[[[Category:All articles with unsourced statements]] Summary]	Iwamasa 55'	Attendance: 44,131; Referee: (Japan) Kenji Ogiya

25 August 2012 23	Shimizu S-Pulse	0–2	Urawa Red Diamonds	Outsourcing Stadium Nihondaira
19:00 JST		[[[Category:All articles with unsourced statements]] Report]	Umesaki 11'; Abe 20'	Attendance: 23,188; Referee: (Japan) Tomohiro Inoue

1 September 2012 24	Urawa Red Diamonds	1–1	Omiya Ardija	Saitama Stadium 2002
19:00 JST	Haraguchi 11'; Nagata (yellow card) 57'	Summary	Novaković (yellow card) 15' (yellow-red card) 18'; Carlinhos Paraíba (yellow card) 37'; Higashi 45+1'; Kikuchi (yellow card) 90+4'; Ueda (yellow card) 90+5'	Attendance: 39,814; Referee: (Japan) Toshimitsu Yoshida

15 September 2012 25	Yokohama F. Marinos	1–2	Urawa Red Diamonds	International Stadium Yokohama
20:00	Marquinhos 5'		Kashiwagi 23'; Makino 64'	Attendance: 34,954; Referee: (Japan) Yuichi Nishimuri

22 September 2012 26	Urawa Red Diamonds	0–5	Gamba Osaka	Saitama Stadium 2002
17:00	Makino (yellow card) 40'; Suzuki (yellow card) 55'		Abe 19'; Ienaga (yellow card) 26'; Leandro 36', 60'; Omori (yellow card) 69'; Paulinho 87', 90+2'	Attendance: 46,046; Referee: (Japan) Kenji Ogiya

29 September 2012 27	Kashiwa Reysol	1–2	Urawa Red Diamonds	Hitachi Kashiwa Soccer Stadium
20:00	Kondo (yellow card) 4'; Fujita (yellow card) 17' (goal) 90'	Summary	Makino (yellow card) 32'; Umesaki 39'; Popó 90+3'	Attendance: 26,106; Referee: (Japan) Nobutsugu Murakami

6 October 2012 28	Urawa Red Diamonds	–	Consadole Sapporo	Saitama Stadium 2002
20:00				Referee: (Japan)

20 October 2012 29	Vegalta Sendai	–	Urawa Red Diamonds	Yurtec Stadium Sendai
14:00				Referee: (Japan)

27 October 2012 30	Urawa Red Diamonds	–	Cerezo Osaka	Saitama Stadium 2002
15:00				Referee: (Japan)

7 November 2012 31	Kawasaki Frontale	–	Urawa Red Diamonds	Todoroki Athletics Stadium
19:00				Referee: (Japan)

17 November 2012 32	Urawa Red Diamonds	–	Sanfrecce Hiroshima	Saitama Stadium 2002
14:00				Referee: (Japan)

24 November 2012 33	Sagan Tosu	–	Urawa Red Diamonds	Tosu Stadium
14:30				Referee: (Japan)

1 December 2012 34	Urawa Red Diamonds	–	Nagoya Grampus	Saitama Stadium 2002
15:30				Referee: (Japan)

=== J. League Cup ===
Team	Pld	W	D	L	GF	GA	GD	Pts
Cerezo Osaka	6	4	0	2	15	7	+8	12
Vegalta Sendai	6	4	0	2	11	5	+4	12
Jubilo Iwata	6	4	0	2	10	11	−1	12
Urawa Red Diamonds	6	3	0	3	12	10	+2	9
Sagan Tosu	6	3	0	3	8	16	−8	9
Sanfrecce Hiroshima	6	1	1	4	8	11	−3	4
Kawasaki Frontale	6	1	1	4	7	11	−4	4

20 March 2012 Group A	Urawa Red Diamonds	1–0	Vegalta Sendai	Saitama Stadium 2002
Tuesday 15:01	Nagata 49'	Report		Attendance: 23,076; Referee: Okabe

4 April 2012 Group A	Jubilo Iwata	4–3	Urawa Red Diamonds	Yamaha Stadium
Wednesday 19:04	Maeda 7'; Chiyotanda 57'; Matsuura 77'; Yamada 82'	Report	34' Kojima; 45+1' Own-goal; 79' Takahashi	Attendance: 7,824; Referee: Ogiya

18 April 2012 Group A	Urawa Red Diamonds	1–4	Cerezo Osaka	Saitama Stadium 2002
20:30 JST	Kojima (yellow card) 7'; Yajima 42'; Kashiwagi (yellow card) 85'	Report	Kiyotake 11'; Fujimoto 45'; Branquinho 49'; Sakemoto (yellow card) 65'; Bando 81' 83'	Attendance: 16,533; Referee: Ryuji Sato

16 May 2012 Group A	Kawasaki Frontale	0–3	Urawa Red Diamonds	Todoroki Athletics Stadium
20:00 JST		Report	Kashiwagi 32'; Ugajin (yellow card) 42' (goal) 57', 83'; Špiranović (yellow card) 47'	Attendance: 13,608; Referee: Nobutsugu Murakami

6 June 2012 Group A	Sagan Tosu	2–1	Urawa Red Diamonds	Tosu Stadium
20:00 JST	Toyoda 52' (yellow card) 64'; Mizunuma 80'	Report	Tsuboi (yellow card) 56'; Marcio Richardes 77'	Attendance: 7,284; Referee: Hiroyuki Kimura

27 June 2012 Group A	Urawa Red Diamonds	3–0	Sanfrecce Hiroshima	Saitama Stadium 2002
20:00 JST	Kojima (yellow card) 17'; Despotović 43' (yellow card) 90+2'; Noda 63'; Yajima 80'	Report	Shimizu (yellow card) 67'	Attendance: 14,022; Referee: Koichiro Fukushima

=== Emperor's Cup ===
8 September 2012 Round 2	Urawa Red Diamonds	2–1	Volca Kagoshima	Saitama, Saitama
13:00	Tanaka 30'; Popó 48'	Summary	Kuriyama 9'	Stadium: Urawa Komaba Stadium; Attendance: 8,975; Referee: Hiroyoshi Takayama

10 October 2012 Round 3	Kamatamare Sanuki	–	Urawa Red Diamonds	Saga, Saga
19:00				Stadium: Saga Stadium
