= Ryōta Tsuzuki =

Japanese footballer

Ryota Tsuzuki 都築 龍太
Personal information
- Full name: Ryota Tsuzuki
- Date of birth: April 18, 1978 (age 48)
- Place of birth: Heguri, Nara, Japan
- Height: 1.85 m (6 ft 1 in)
- Position: Goalkeeper

Youth career
- 1994–1996: Kunimi High School

Senior career*
Years	Team	Apps	(Gls)
1997–2002	Gamba Osaka	63	(0)
2003–2010	Urawa Reds	172	(0)
2010	Shonan Bellmare	15	(0)
Total		250	(0)

International career
2001–2009	Japan	6	(0)
Medal record
Men's football
Representing Japan
FIFA Confederations Cup
Runner-up	2001 Korea/Japan
- * Club domestic league appearances and goals

Ryota Tsuzuki (都築 龍太, Tsuzuki Ryōta; born April 18, 1978) is a former Japanese football player. He played six times for Japan national team.

== Club career ==
Tsuzuki was born in Heguri, Nara on April 18, 1978. After graduating from Kunimi High School in Nagasaki, he joined J1 League side Gamba Osaka in 1997. He made his professional debut on November 11, 1998 at Expo '70 Commemorative Stadium. He became the first choice goalkeeper in 2000 dislodging Hayato Okanaka but he was transferred to Urawa Reds at the end of the 2002 season after a row with manager Akira Nishino. At Reds, he battles with Norihiro Yamagishi for the position. From 2005, he completely played as first goalkeeper except for 2006 for injury. The club won the champions 2006 J1 League, 2003 J.League Cup, 2005 and 2006 Emperor's Cup. In Asia, the club won the champions 2007 AFC Champions League and also won the 3rd place 2007 Club World Cup. However his opportunity to play decreased due to injury from 2009. He moved to Shonan Bellmare in June 2010. It announced one's retirement on January 18, 2011.

== National team career ==
In September 2000, Tsuzuki was elected Japan U-23 national team for 2000 Summer Olympics. But he did not play in the match behind Seigo Narazaki.

In February 2001, Tsuzuki was elected Japan national team for 2001 Confederations Cup. At this tournament, on April 8, he debuted against Brazil. Although he played only one game, Japan won the 2nd place. Because Yoshikatsu Kawaguchi and Seigo Narazaki played most matches for Japan in 2000s, Tsuzuki could hardly play in the match. He played 6 games for Japan until 2009.

== Later career ==
In 2015, Tsuzuki became a Liberal Democratic Party member of Saitama City Council.

== Club statistics ==
Club	Season	League		Emperor's Cup		J.League Cup		Champions League		Other^{1}		Total	
Club	Season	Apps	Goals	Apps	Goals	Apps	Goals	Apps	Goals	Apps	Goals	Apps	Goals
Gamba Osaka	1997	0	0	0	0	0	0	—		—		0	0
Gamba Osaka	1998	1	0	0	0	0	0	—		—		1	0
Gamba Osaka	1999	2	0	0	0	0	0	—		—		2	0
Gamba Osaka	2000	19	0	4	0	2	0	—		—		25	0
Gamba Osaka	2001	29	0	3	0	1	0	—		—		33	0
Gamba Osaka	2002	12	0	0	0	3	0	—		—		15	0
Gamba Osaka	Total	63	0	7	0	6	0	—		—		76	0
Urawa Reds	2003	20	0	0	0	7	0	—		—		27	0
Urawa Reds	2004	19	0	0	0	7	0	—		—		26	0
Urawa Reds	2005	33	0	3	0	9	0	—		—		45	0
Urawa Reds	2006	11	0	5	0	1	0	—		—		17	0
Urawa Reds	2007	33	0	0	0	1	0	12	0	5	0	51	0
Urawa Reds	2008	33	0	1	0	2	0	3	0	—		39	0
Urawa Reds	2009	23	0	0	0	0	0	—		—		23	0
Urawa Reds	2010	0	0	0	0	0	0	—		—		0	0
Urawa Reds	Total	172	0	9	0	27	0	15	0	5	0	228	0
Shonan Bellmare	2010	15	0	0	0	0	0	—		—		15	0
Shonan Bellmare	Total	15	0	0	0	0	0	—		—		15	0
Career total		250	0	16	0	33	0	15	0	5	0	319	0

^{1}Includes other competitive competitions, including the Japanese Super Cup, A3 Champions Cup and FIFA Club World Cup.

== National team statistics ==
Japan national team
Year	Apps	Goals
2001	2	0
2002	0	0
2003	0	0
2004	1	0
2005	0	0
2006	0	0
2007	0	0
2008	0	0
2009	3	0
Total	6	0

=== Appearances in major competitions ===
Team	Competition	Category	Appearances		Goals	Team Record
Team	Competition	Category	Start	Sub	Goals	Team Record
Japan	2001 FIFA Confederations Cup	Senior	1	0	0	Runner-up
Japan	2010 FIFA World Cup qualification	Senior	1	0	0	Qualified

== Awards and honours ==
=== Club ===
Urawa Reds

- J1 League: 1

2006

- Emperor's Cup: 2

2005, 2006

- J.League Cup: 1

2003

- AFC Champions League: 1

2007

- Japanese Super Cup: 1

2006

=== Individual ===
- J.League Best XI: 1

2007
