= Masayuki Okano =

Japanese footballer

Masayuki Okano 岡野 雅行
Personal information
- Date of birth: 25 July 1972 (age 54)
- Place of birth: Yokohama, Kanagawa, Japan
- Height: 1.75 m (5 ft 9 in)
- Positions: Midfielder; forward

Youth career
- 1988–1990: Matsue Nihon University High School

College career
Years	Team	Apps	(Gls)
1991–1993	Nihon University		

Senior career*
Years	Team	Apps	(Gls)
1994–2001	Urawa Reds	211	(36)
2001–2003	Vissel Kobe	58	(4)
2004–2008	Urawa Reds	58	(2)
2009	TSW Pegasus	9	(1)
2009–2013	Gainare Tottori	66	(1)
Total		402	(44)

International career
1995–1999	Japan	25	(2)
- * Club domestic league appearances and goals

Masayuki Okano (岡野 雅行, Okano Masayuki; born 25 July 1972) is a Japanese former professional footballer who played as a midfielder or forward. He played for the Japan national team.

== Club career ==
Okano was born in Yokohama on 25 July 1972. After dropped out from Nihon University, he joined Urawa Reds in 1994. In 1990s, he played as forward in many matches from first season. In 2001 season, his opportunity to play decreased and he moved to Vissel Kobe in September. He played as midfielder from then. He returned to Urawa Reds in 2004. The club won the champions 2006 J1 League, 2005 and 2006 Emperor's Cup. In Asia, the club won 2007 AFC Champions League. In 2009, he moved to Hong Kong First Division League club TSW Pegasus. In July 2009, he returned to Japan and joined Japan Football League club Gainare Tottori. The club won the champions in 2010 and was promoted to J2 League. He retired at the end of the 2013 season.

== International career ==
In January 1995, he was selected by the Japan national team for the 1995 King Fahd Cup, but he did not play. On 20 September 1995, he debuted for the Japan national team against Paraguay. In 1996, he played at the 1996 Asian Cup. During 1998 World Cup qualification, in the final qualifier match for the 1998 World Cup against Iran, he scored the golden goal that took Japan to their first ever World Cup finals. At the 1998 World Cup, he played 29 minutes as a substitute against Croatia. He also played at the 1999 Copa America. This competition was his last game for Japan. He played 25 games and scored 2 goals for Japan until 1999.

== Career statistics ==
=== Club ===
Appearances and goals by club, season and competition
Club	Season	League			National cup (Note: Includes Emperor's Cup, FA Cup, Shield)		League cup (Note: Includes J.League Cup, Hong Kong League Cup)		Asia		Total	
Club	Season	Division	Apps	Goals	Apps	Goals	Apps	Goals	Apps	Goals	Apps	Goals
Urawa Reds	1994	J1 League	35	3	3	0	2	0	–		40	3
Urawa Reds	1995	J1 League	44	5	3	0	–		–		47	5
Urawa Reds	1996	J1 League	30	11	3	2	13	2	–		46	15
Urawa Reds	1997	J1 League	23	4	2	1	0	0	–		25	5
Urawa Reds	1998	J1 League	34	7	2	1	0	0	–		36	8
Urawa Reds	1999	J1 League	11	0	0	0	4	0	–		15	0
Urawa Reds	2000	J2 League	26	6	4	1	2	0	–		32	7
Urawa Reds	2001	J1 League	8	0	0	0	1	0	–		9	0
Urawa Reds	Total		211	36	17	5	22	2	0	0	250	43
Vissel Kobe	2001	J1 League	11	3	2	0	0	0	–		13	3
Vissel Kobe	2002	J1 League	24	1	1	0	5	0	–		30	1
Vissel Kobe	2003	J1 League	23	0	2	0	6	1	–		31	1
Vissel Kobe	Total		58	4	5	0	11	1	0	0	74	5
Urawa Reds	2004	J1 League	15	1	2	0	8	2	–		25	3
Urawa Reds	2005	J1 League	20	1	4	0	7	0	–		31	1
Urawa Reds	2006	J1 League	8	0	2	0	6	0	–		16	0
Urawa Reds	2007	J1 League	11	0	1	0	1	0	6	0	19	0
Urawa Reds	2008	J1 League	4	0	0	0	3	0	0	0	7	0
Urawa Reds	Total		58	2	9	0	25	2	6	0	98	4
TSW Pegasus	2008/09	First Division	9	1	4	0	1	0	–		14	1
Gainare Tottori	2009	Football League	7	1	1	0	–		–		8	1
Gainare Tottori	2010	Football League	16	0	0	0	–		–		16	0
Gainare Tottori	2011	J2 League	13	0	1	0	–		–		14	0
Gainare Tottori	2012	J2 League	20	0	0	0	–		–		20	0
Gainare Tottori	2013	J2 League	10	0	1	0	–		–		11	0
Gainare Tottori	Total		66	1	3	0	0	0	0	0	69	1
Career total			402	44	38	5	59	5	6	0	505	54

=== International ===
Appearances and goals by national team and year
National team	Year	Apps	Goals
Japan	1995	3	0
Japan	1996	11	1
Japan	1997	5	1
Japan	1998	5	0
Japan	1999	1	0
Total		25	2

Scores and results list Japan's goal tally first, score column indicates score after each Okano goal.

List of international goals scored by Masayuki Okano
No.	Date	Venue	Opponent	Score	Result	Competition
1	25 August 1996	Nagai Stadium, Osaka, Japan	Uruguay	5–3	5–3	Friendly
2	16 November 1997	Larkin Stadium, Johor Bahru, Malaysia	Iran	3–2	3–2	1998 FIFA World Cup qualification AFC play-off

== Honours ==
Urawa Red Diamonds

- AFC Champions League: 2007
- J1 League: 2006
- Emperor's Cup: 2005, 2006
- Japanese Super Cup: 2006

Gainare Tottori

- Japan Football League: 2010

Individual

- J.League Best XI: 1996
- J.League Fair Play Award: 1996

Professional wrestling championships

- DDT Pro-Wrestling: Ironman Heavymetalweight Championship (1 time)
