= Grall =

Grall is a surname. Notable people with the surname include:

- Charlie Grall (1955–2026), French journalist
- Erin Grall (born 1977), American politician
- Michel Grall (born 1961), French politician
- Xavier Grall (1930–1981), French journalist and poet

== See also ==
- Groll
- Rall
