= Takuya Yokoyama =

Japanese footballer

Takuya Yokoyama 横山 拓也
Personal information
- Full name: Takuya Yokoyama
- Date of birth: June 29, 1985 (age 41)
- Place of birth: Shizuoka, Shizuoka, Japan
- Height: 1.77 m (5 ft 9 1/2 in)
- Position: Forward

Youth career
- 2001–2003: Shizuoka Gakuen High School

Senior career*
Years	Team	Apps	(Gls)
2004–2006	Urawa Reds	11	(2)
2007	Montedio Yamagata	38	(8)
2008	Ehime FC	20	(3)
2009–2010	Fujieda MYFC	20	(10)
Total		89	(23)
Medal record
Urawa Reds
Winner	J1 League	2006
Runner-up	J1 League	2004
Runner-up	J1 League	2005
Runner-up	J.League Cup	2004
Winner	Emperor's Cup	2005
Winner	Emperor's Cup	2006
- * Club domestic league appearances and goals

Takuya Yokoyama (横山 拓也, Yokoyama Takuya; born June 29, 1985) is a former Japanese football player.

== Career statistics ==
Appearances and goals by club, season and competition
Club	Season	League			Emperor's Cup		J.League Cup		Total	
Club	Season	Division	Apps	Goals	Apps	Goals	Apps	Goals	Apps	Goals
Urawa Reds	2004	J1 League	2	0	1	0	0	0	3	0
Urawa Reds	2005	J1 League	9	2	0	0	4	0	13	2
Urawa Reds	2006	J1 League	0	0	1	0	0	0	1	0
Montedio Yamagata	2007	J2 League	38	8	2	0	—		40	8
Ehime FC	2008	J2 League	20	3	2	0	—		22	3
Career total			69	13	6	0	4	0	79	13
