= Tatsuya Tanaka (footballer, born 1982) =

Japanese footballer (born 1982)

Tatsuya Tanaka 田中 達也
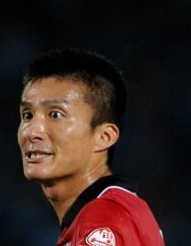
- Tanaka in 2011

Personal information
- Full name: Tatsuya Tanaka
- Date of birth: 27 November 1982 (age 43)
- Place of birth: Shunan, Yamaguchi, Japan
- Height: 1.67 m (5 ft 5 1/2 in)
- Position: Forward

Youth career
- 1998–2000: Teikyo High School

Senior career*
| Years | Team | Apps | (Gls) |
| 2001–2012 | Urawa Red Diamonds | 233 | (56) |
| 2013–2021 | Albirex Niigata | 156 | (13) |
| Total | | 389 | (69) |

International career
| 2004 | Japan U23 | 3 | (0) |
| 2005–2009 | Japan | 16 | (3) |

Managerial career
- 2026: Urawa Red Diamonds (caretaker)
Medal record
Representing Japan
Asian Games
| Silver medal – second place | 2002 Busan | Team |
- * Club domestic league appearances and goals

Tatsuya Tanaka (田中 達也, Tanaka Tatsuya; born 27 November 1982) is a Japanese professional football coach and former player who played as a forward.

== Club career ==
When he was at Shūyō Junior High School, he represented Yamaguchi Prefecture with future international teammate Seiichiro Maki. He went on to football powerhouse Teikyo High School. While at Teikyo, Tanaka was chosen as one of the Designated Players for Development by J.League and JFA. Because of this status, he was able to register as a FC Tokyo player while he was still eligible to play for his high school club.

After graduating Teikyo, he joined Urawa Reds. His first league appearance came on 29 April 2001 against Kashima Antlers. His first professional goal came on 21 May 2001 against Tokyo Verdy. He played many matches as forward from 2001 season. In 2003, Reds won the champions in J.League Cup. He was selected MVP award and New Hero award. However he suffered for repeated injuries from late 2005 while the club won many title, 2005 Emperor's Cup, 2006 J1 League, 2006 Emperor's Cup and 2007 AFC Champions League. In 2012, he could not play many matches and let the club end of 2012 season.

In 2013, Tanaka signed with Albirex Niigata. He played 32 matches in 2013 season, the most in his career. Although he played many matches every season, Albirex was relegated to J2 League end of 2017 season.

After nine years in Niigata, Tanaka officially retired on 5 December 2021, when he left the pitch after 40 minutes into the home match against Machida Zelvia. Tanaka immediately joined Niigata's coaching staff for the youth sector.

== National team career ==
Tanaka represented Japan at several underage levels. He was part of the Japanese 2004 Olympic football team eliminated in the first round after finishing fourth in group B, below group winners Paraguay, Italy, and Ghana.

He made his international debut on 31 July 2005 in an East Asian Championship against North Korea when he replaced Keiji Tamada in the 67th minute. He scored his first international goal on 3 August 2005 against China in the same tournament. His most recent goal came against Qatar on 19 November 2008. He played 16 games and scored 3 goals for Japan until 2009.

== Career statistics ==
=== Club ===
Appearances and goals by club, season and competition
| Club | Season | League | | | Emperor's Cup | | J.League Cup | | Continental | | Other | | Total | |
| Club | Season | Division | Apps | Goals | Apps | Goals | Apps | Goals | Apps | Goals | Apps | Goals | Apps | Goals |
|---|---|---|---|---|---|---|---|---|---|---|---|---|---|---|
| Urawa Red Diamonds | 2001 | J. League Division 1 | 19 | 3 | 0 | 0 | 4 | 0 | — | | — | | 23 | 3 |
| Urawa Red Diamonds | 2002 | J. League Division 1 | 23 | 5 | 1 | 0 | 3 | 0 | — | | — | | 27 | 5 |
| Urawa Red Diamonds | 2003 | J. League Division 1 | 26 | 11 | 1 | 0 | 10 | 4 | — | | — | | 37 | 15 |
| Urawa Red Diamonds | 2004 | J. League Division 1 | 23 | 10 | 4 | 4 | 6 | 4 | — | | 2 (Note: Appearances in J.League Championship) | 0 | 35 | 18 |
| Urawa Red Diamonds | 2005 | J. League Division 1 | 25 | 8 | 0 | 0 | 8 | 3 | — | | — | | 33 | 11 |
| Urawa Red Diamonds | 2006 | J. League Division 1 | 18 | 4 | 1 | 2 | 0 | 0 | — | | 0 | 0 | 19 | 6 |
| Urawa Red Diamonds | 2007 | J. League Division 1 | 18 | 9 | 0 | 0 | 1 | 0 | 8 (Note: Six appearances and three goals in AFC Champions League, two appearances in A3 Champions Cup) | 3 | 0 | 0 | 27 | 12 |
| Urawa Red Diamonds | 2008 | J. League Division 1 | 15 | 2 | 1 | 0 | 4 | 1 | 2 (Note: Appearances in AFC Champions League) | 0 | — | | 22 | 3 |
| Urawa Red Diamonds | 2009 | J. League Division 1 | 15 | 0 | 1 | 0 | 0 | 0 | — | | — | | 16 | 0 |
| Urawa Red Diamonds | 2010 | J. League Division 1 | 22 | 2 | 2 | 0 | 2 | 0 | — | | — | | 26 | 2 |
| Urawa Red Diamonds | 2011 | J. League Division 1 | 22 | 2 | 0 | 0 | 1 | 0 | — | | — | | 23 | 2 |
| Urawa Red Diamonds | 2012 | J. League Division 1 | 7 | 0 | 2 | 1 | 2 | 0 | — | | — | | 11 | 1 |
| Urawa Red Diamonds | Total | | 233 | 56 | 13 | 7 | 41 | 12 | 8 | 3 | 2 | 0 | 299 | 78 |
| Albirex Niigata | 2013 | J. League Division 1 | 32 | 2 | 1 | 0 | 3 | 0 | — | | — | | 36 | 2 |
| Albirex Niigata | 2014 | J. League Division 1 | 24 | 2 | 2 | 2 | 4 | 1 | — | | — | | 30 | 5 |
| Albirex Niigata | 2015 | J1 League | 13 | 1 | 2 | 2 | 5 | 0 | — | | — | | 20 | 3 |
| Albirex Niigata | 2016 | J1 League | 20 | 3 | 3 | 0 | 3 | 0 | — | | — | | 26 | 3 |
| Albirex Niigata | 2017 | J1 League | 11 | 2 | 0 | 0 | 2 | 2 | — | | — | | 13 | 4 |
| Albirex Niigata | 2018 | J2 League | 31 | 2 | 0 | 0 | 6 | 2 | — | | — | | 37 | 4 |
| Albirex Niigata | 2019 | J2 League | 17 | 1 | 1 | 0 | — | | — | | — | | 18 | 1 |
| Albirex Niigata | 2020 | J2 League | 7 | 0 | — | | — | | — | | — | | 7 | 0 |
| Albirex Niigata | 2021 | J2 League | 1 | 0 | 0 | 0 | — | | — | | — | | 1 | 0 |
| Albirex Niigata | Total | | 156 | 13 | 9 | 4 | 23 | 5 | — | | — | | 188 | 22 |
| Career total | | | 389 | 69 | 22 | 11 | 64 | 17 | 10 | 3 | 2 | 0 | 487 | 100 |

=== International ===
Appearances and goals by national team and year
| National team | Year | Apps | Goals |
|---|---|---|---|
Japan
| Japan | 2005 | 2 | 1 |
| Japan | 2006 | 4 | 0 |
| Japan | 2007 | 2 | 0 |
| Japan | 2008 | 4 | 1 |
| Japan | 2009 | 4 | 1 |
| Total | | 16 | 3 |

Scores and results list Japan's goal tally first, score column indicates score after each Tanaka goal.

List of international goals scored by Tatsuya Tanaka
| No. | Date | Venue | Opponent | Score | Result | Competition |
|---|---|---|---|---|---|---|
| 1 | 3 August 2005 | Daejeon World Cup Stadium, Daejeon, South Korea | China | 2–2 | 2–2 | 2005 East Asian Football Championship |
| 2 | 19 November 2008 | Jassim Bin Hamad Stadium, Doha, Qatar | Qatar | 1–0 | 3–0 | 2010 FIFA World Cup Qualification |
| 3 | 20 January 2009 | KKWing Stadium, Kumamoto, Japan | Yemen | 2–1 | 2–1 | 2011 AFC Asian Cup Qualification |

== Honours ==
Urawa Red Diamonds

- J1 League: 2006
- Emperor's Cup: 2005, 2006
- J.League Cup: 2003
- AFC Champions League: 2007
- Japanese Super Cup: 2006

Individual

- J.League Cup MVP: 2003
- J.League Cup New Hero Award: 2003
