= 2002 J.League Cup =

J.League Yamazaki Nabisco Cup

Tournament details
- Country: Japan
- Dates: 27 April – 4 November 2002
- Teams: 16

Final positions
- Champions: Kashima Antlers (3rd title)
- Runners-up: Urawa Red Diamonds
- Semifinalists: Shimizu S-Pulse; Gamba Osaka

Tournament statistics
- Matches played: 55
- Goals scored: 144 (2.62 per match)
- Attendance: 527,291 (9,587 per match)
- Top goal scorer(s): Emerson Sheik; Magrão (6 goals each)

Awards
- MVP Award: Mitsuo Ogasawara

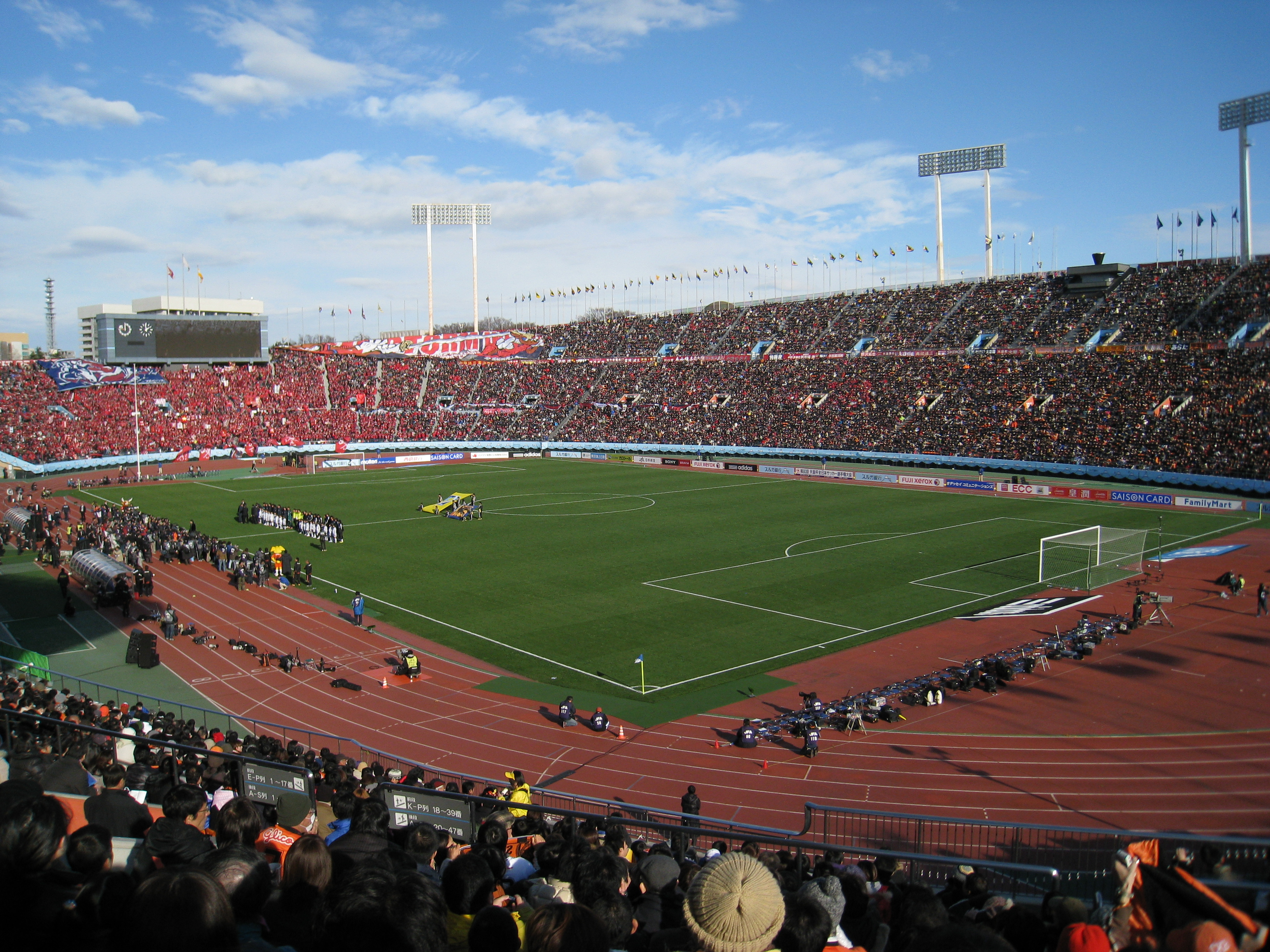
kokuritshuKasumigaoka National Stadium.

Statistics of J. League Cup, officially the 2002 J.League Yamazaki Nabisco Cup, in the 2002 season.

== Overview ==
It was contested by 16 teams, and Kashima Antlers won the cup.

== Results ==
=== Group A ===
| Pos | Team | Pld | W | D | L | GF | GA | GD | Pts | Qualification |
|---|---|---|---|---|---|---|---|---|---|---|
| 1 | Jubilo Iwata | 6 | 3 | 3 | 0 | 9 | 2 | +7 | 12 | Quarterfinals |
| 2 | Kashiwa Reysol | 6 | 1 | 4 | 1 | 2 | 2 | 0 | 7 | Quarterfinals |
| 3 | Vegalta Sendai | 6 | 1 | 3 | 2 | 4 | 8 | −4 | 6 | |
| 4 | Consadole Sapporo | 6 | 1 | 2 | 3 | 3 | 6 | −3 | 5 | |

Source: rsssf.com

=== Group B ===
| Pos | Team | Pld | W | D | L | GF | GA | GD | Pts | Qualification |
|---|---|---|---|---|---|---|---|---|---|---|
| 1 | FC Tokyo | 6 | 4 | 1 | 1 | 8 | 3 | +5 | 13 | Quarterfinals |
| 2 | Shimizu S-Pulse | 6 | 4 | 0 | 2 | 9 | 8 | +1 | 12 | Quarterfinals |
| 3 | Tokyo Verdy 1969 | 6 | 2 | 1 | 3 | 10 | 10 | 0 | 7 | |
| 4 | Vissel Kobe | 6 | 0 | 2 | 4 | 5 | 11 | −6 | 2 | |

Source: rsssf.com

=== Group C ===
| Pos | Team | Pld | W | D | L | GF | GA | GD | Pts | Qualification |
|---|---|---|---|---|---|---|---|---|---|---|
| 1 | JEF United Ichihara | 6 | 3 | 2 | 1 | 14 | 10 | +4 | 11 | Quarterfinals |
| 2 | Gamba Osaka | 6 | 2 | 2 | 2 | 12 | 12 | 0 | 8 | Quarterfinals |
| 3 | Yokohama F. Marinos | 6 | 2 | 1 | 3 | 5 | 8 | −3 | 7 | |
| 4 | Kyoto Purple Sanga | 6 | 1 | 3 | 2 | 7 | 8 | −1 | 6 | |

Source: rsssf.com

=== Group D ===
| Pos | Team | Pld | W | D | L | GF | GA | GD | Pts | Qualification |
|---|---|---|---|---|---|---|---|---|---|---|
| 1 | Urawa Red Diamonds | 6 | 4 | 1 | 1 | 12 | 10 | +2 | 13 | Quarterfinals |
| 2 | Kashima Antlers | 6 | 3 | 0 | 3 | 9 | 10 | −1 | 9 | Quarterfinals |
| 3 | Nagoya Grampus Eight | 6 | 2 | 1 | 3 | 11 | 9 | +2 | 7 | |
| 4 | Sanfrecce Hiroshima | 6 | 1 | 2 | 3 | 4 | 7 | −3 | 5 | |

Source: rsssf.com

=== Quarterfinals ===
4 September 2002
19:00

| Júbilo Iwata | 1–2 | Kashima Antlers |
|---|---|---|
| Nakayama 7' | Report | Euller 22', 74' |

Júbilo Iwata Stadium, Iwata
Attendance: 10,706
Referee: Masayoshi Okada

4 September 2002
19:03

| JEF United Ichihara | 0–3 | Shimizu S-Pulse |
|---|---|---|
| | Report | Hiramatsu 27'; Alex 55'; Kuboyama 89' |

Ichihara Stadium, Ichihara
Attendance: 3,345
Referee: Toru Kamikawa

4 September 2002
19:03

| FC Tokyo | 1–3 | Gamba Osaka |
|---|---|---|
| Toda 28' | Report | Endō 53'; Araiba 62'; Oguro 76' |

Ajinomoto Stadium, Tokyo
Attendance: 10,895
Referee: Joji Kashihara

4 September 2002
19:04

| Urawa Red Diamonds | 1–0 | Kashiwa Reysol |
|---|---|---|
| Emerson Sheik 69' | Report |

Urawa Komaba Stadium, Saitama
Attendance: 9,597
Referee: Toshimitsu Yoshida

=== Semifinals ===
2 October 2002
19:00

| Kashima Antlers | 2–1 (a.e.t.) | Shimizu S-Pulse |
|---|---|---|
| Unknown 25' (o.g.); Hasegawa 106' | Report | Alex 67' |

Kashima Soccer Stadium, Kashima
Attendance: 9,102
Referee: Masayoshi Okada

2 October 2002
19:00

| Gamba Osaka | 2–3 (a.e.t.) | Urawa Red Diamonds |
|---|---|---|
| Magrão 34', 38' | Report | Emerson Sheik 20', 49' 107' |

Expo '70 Commemorative Stadium, Osaka
Attendance: 7,440
Referee: Toru Kamikawa

=== Final ===
4 November 2002
14:09

| Kashima Antlers | 1–0 | Urawa Red Diamonds |
|---|---|---|
| Ogasawara 59' | Report |

National Stadium, Tokyo
Attendance: 56,064
Referee: Toshimitsu Yoshida

Kashima Antlers won the cup.
