= 2003 J.League Cup =

J.League Yamazaki Nabisco Cup

Tournament details
- Country: Japan
- Dates: 8 March 2003 - 3 November 2003
- Teams: 16

Final positions
- Champions: Urawa Red Diamonds (1st title)
- Runners-up: Kashima Antlers
- Semifinalists: Júbilo Iwata; Shimizu S-Pulse

Tournament statistics
- Matches played: 49

The J.League Cup 2003, officially the 2003 J.League Yamazaki Nabisco Cup, was the first edition of Japan soccer league cup tournament and the 11th edition under the current J.League Cup format. The competition started on March 8, and finished on November 3, 2003.

Teams from the J1 took part in the tournament. Kashima Antlers and Shimizu S-Pulse were given a bye to the quarter-final due to their qualification for the AFC Champions League. The rest of 14 teams started from the group stage, where they're divided into four groups. The group winners of each group qualifies for the quarter-final along with the runners-up of group A and B, and the two teams which qualified for the AFC Champions League.

== Group stage ==
=== Group A ===
Team	Pld	W	D	L	GF	GA	GD	Pts
Júbilo Iwata	6	3	1	2	13	8	+5	10
Urawa Red Diamonds	6	2	2	2	4	5	−1	8
Tokyo Verdy 1969	6	2	2	2	7	10	−3	8
Vissel Kobe	6	2	1	3	9	10	−1	7

2003-03-08
Júbilo Iwata	2–0	Urawa Red Diamonds
Tokyo Verdy 1969	0–1	Vissel Kobe
2003-03-15
Vissel Kobe	4–2	Júbilo Iwata
Urawa Red Diamonds	0–1	Tokyo Verdy 1969
2003-04-09
Júbilo Iwata	4–0	Tokyo Verdy 1969
Vissel Kobe	1–2	Urawa Red Diamonds
2003-04-23
Urawa Red Diamonds	0–0	Júbilo Iwata
Vissel Kobe	2–2	Tokyo Verdy 1969
2003-07-02
Tokyo Verdy 1969	1–1	Urawa Red Diamonds
Júbilo Iwata	3–1	Vissel Kobe
2003-07-16
Urawa Red Diamonds	1–0	Vissel Kobe
Tokyo Verdy 1969	3–2	Júbilo Iwata

=== Group B ===
Team	Pld	W	D	L	GF	GA	GD	Pts
FC Tokyo	6	3	2	1	12	5	+7	11
Yokohama F. Marinos	6	3	2	1	10	5	+5	11
Vegalta Sendai	6	2	1	3	9	11	−2	7
Kashiwa Reysol	6	0	3	3	3	13	−10	3

2003-03-08
Kashiwa Reysol	1–1	Vegalta Sendai
Yokohama F. Marinos	1–0	FC Tokyo
2003-03-15
FC Tokyo	2–2	Yokohama F. Marinos
Vegalta Sendai	4–1	Kashiwa Reysol
2003-04-09
Kashiwa Reysol	0–3	Yokohama F. Marinos
FC Tokyo	4–1	Vegalta Sendai
2003-04-23
FC Tokyo	4–0	Kashiwa Reysol
Yokohama F. Marinos	0–2	Vegalta Sendai
2003-07-02
Vegalta Sendai	0–3	Yokohama F. Marinos
Kashiwa Reysol	0–0	FC Tokyo
2003-07-16
Vegalta Sendai	1–2	FC Tokyo
Yokohama F. Marinos	1–1	Kashiwa Reysol

=== Group C ===
Team	Pld	W	D	L	GF	GA	GD	Pts
Gamba Osaka	4	2	1	1	8	6	+2	7
Cerezo Osaka	4	1	2	1	4	4	0	5
JEF United Ichihara	4	1	1	2	5	7	−2	4

2003-03-08
Gamba Osaka	1–0	Cerezo Osaka
2003-03-15
JEF United Ichihara	1–2	Cerezo Osaka
2003-04-09
Cerezo Osaka	0–0	JEF United Ichihara
2003-04-23
Cerezo Osaka	2–2	Gamba Osaka
2003-07-02
Gamba Osaka	4–2	JEF United Ichihara
2003-07-16
JEF United Ichihara	2–1	Gamba Osaka

=== Group D ===
Team	Pld	W	D	L	GF	GA	GD	Pts
Nagoya Grampus Eight	4	2	2	0	3	1	+2	8
Kyoto Purple Sanga	4	1	2	1	5	5	0	5
Ōita Trinita	4	0	2	2	5	7	−2	2

2003-03-08
Kyoto Purple Sanga	3–2	Ōita Trinita
2003-03-15
Ōita Trinita	0–1	Nagoya Grampus Eight
2003-04-09
Nagoya Grampus Eight	0–0	Kyoto Purple Sanga
2003-04-23
Ōita Trinita	2–2	Kyoto Purple Sanga
2003-07-02
Nagoya Grampus Eight	1–1	Ōita Trinita
2003-07-16
Kyoto Purple Sanga	0–1	Nagoya Grampus Eight

== Knockout stage ==
=== Quarter finals ===
==== First leg ====
2003-08-13
19:02

Yokohama F. Marinos	0–1	Júbilo Iwata
		Yasumasa Nishino 19'

Nissan Stadium
Attendance: 12,016
Referee: Akio Okutani

2003-08-13
19:04

Urawa Red Diamonds	2–2	FC Tokyo
Emerson 64'; Toru Chishima 89'		Mitsuhiro Toda 28'; Mitsuhiro Toda 86'

Urawa Komaba Stadium
Attendance: 15,362
Referee: Toshimitsu Yoshida

2003-08-13
19:01

Shimizu S-Pulse	1–1	Gamba Osaka
Ahn Jung Hwan 51'		Magrao 78'

Kusanagi Athletic Stadium
Attendance: 9,070
Referee: Naotsugu Fuse

2003-08-13
19:00

Kashima Antlers	5–1	Nagoya Grampus Eight
Euller 39'; Mitsuo Ogasawara 55'; Kōji Nakata 61'; Kōji Nakata 71'; Tomoyuki Hirase 80'		Keiji Yoshimura 87'

Kashima Soccer Stadium
Attendance: 9,525
Referee: Yoshitsugu Katayama

==== Second leg ====
2003-08-27
19:00

Júbilo Iwata	3–0	Yokohama F. Marinos
Gral 56'; Ryoichi Maeda 69'; Yasumasa Nishino 85'

Yamaha Stadium
Attendance: 8,808
Referee: Kiyoshi Ota

2003-08-27
19:04

FC Tokyo	0–2	Urawa Red Diamonds
		Emerson 60'; Emerson 89'

Ajinomoto Stadium
Attendance: 17,343
Referee: Akio Okutani

2003-08-27
19:02

Gamba Osaka	2–3	Shimizu S-Pulse
Masashi Oguro 70'; Tsuneyasu Miyamoto 82'		Emerson 31'; Ryuzo Morioka 76'; Keisuke Ota 89'

Osaka Expo '70 Stadium
Attendance: 6,053
Referee: Yoshitsugu Katayama

2003-08-27
19:03

Nagoya Grampus Eight	0–1	Kashima Antlers
		Naoki Soma 87'

Mizuho Athletic Stadium
Attendance: 7,751
Referee: Kazuhisa Osada

=== Semi finals ===
==== First leg ====
2003-10-01
19:00

Kashima Antlers	0–1	Júbilo Iwata
		Zivkovic 87'

Kashima Soccer Stadium
Attendance: 9,915
Referee: Toshimitsu Yoshida

2003-10-01
19:04

Shimizu S-Pulse	1–0	Urawa Red Diamonds
Ahn Jung Hwan 23'

Nihondaira Sports Stadium
Attendance: 8,048
Referee: Kiyoshi Ota

==== Second leg ====
2003-10-08
19:00

Júbilo Iwata	0–2	Kashima Antlers
		Fernando 47'; Masashi Motoyama 61'

Yamaha Stadium
Attendance: 11,471
Referee: Masayoshi Okada

2003-10-08
19:04

Urawa Red Diamonds	6–1	Shimizu S-Pulse
Tatsuya Tanaka 26'; Tatsuya Tanaka 44'; Emerson 54'; Emerson 57'; Emerson 62'; Koji Yamase 70'		Tuto 77'

Urawa Komaba Stadium
Attendance: 18,486
Referee: Joji Kashihara

=== Final ===
2003-11-03
14:09

Kashima Antlers	0–4	Urawa Red Diamonds
		Koji Yamase 13'; Emerson 48'; Tatsuya Tanaka 56'; Emerson 86'

Tokyo National Stadium
Attendance: 51,758
Referee: Toru Kamikawa

== Top goalscorers ==
Goalscorers	Goals	Team
(Brazil) Emerson	8	Urawa Red Diamonds
(Japan) Ryoichi Maeda	5	Júbilo Iwata
(Brazil) Gral	5	Júbilo Iwata

== Awards ==
- MVP: Tatsuya Tanaka (Urawa Red Diamonds)
- New Hero Prize: Tatsuya Tanaka (Urawa Red Diamonds)
