= Saitama derby =

Local derby in Saitama

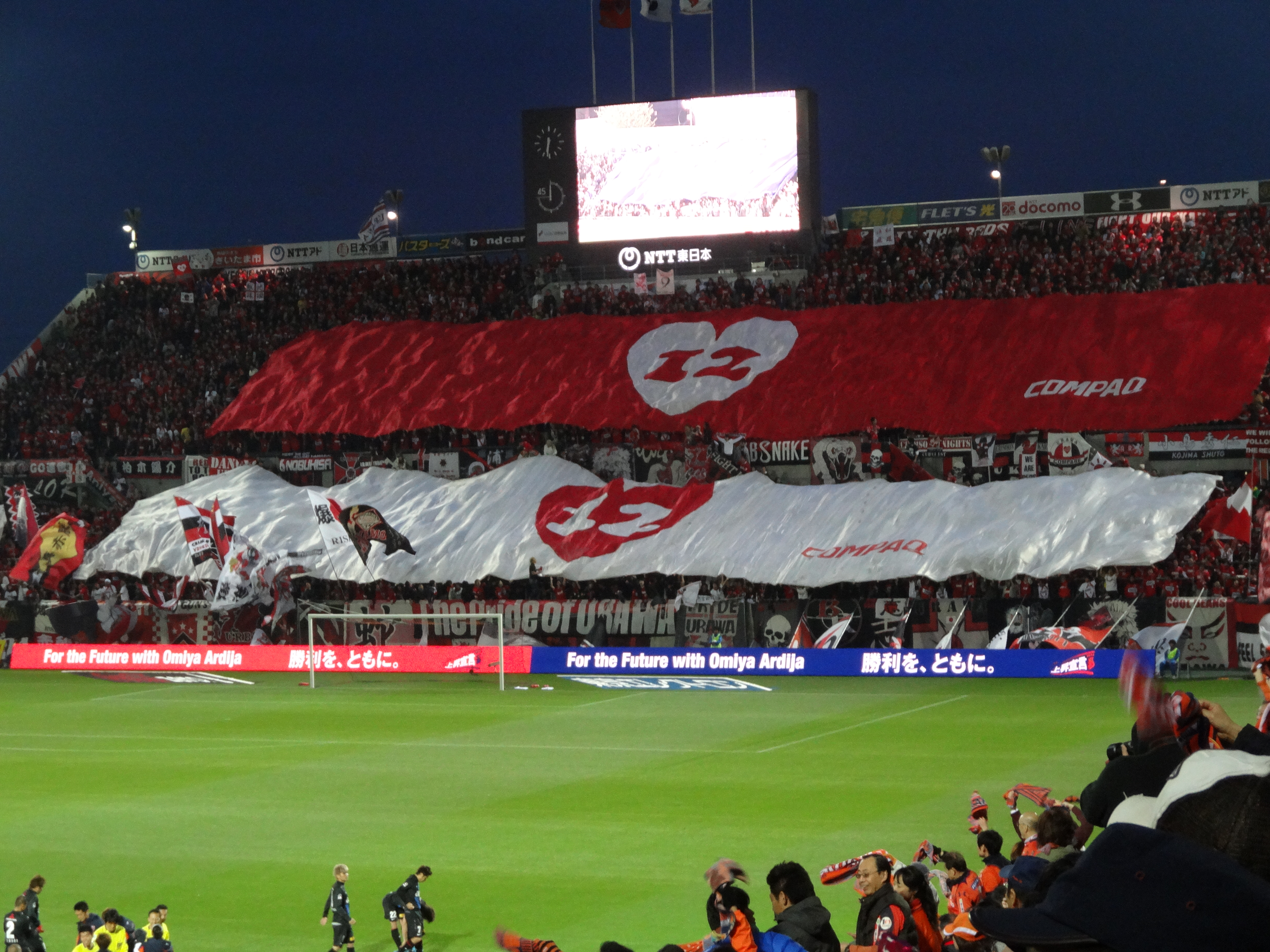
- Saitama derby, 21 April 2012
- Location: Saitama
- Teams: Urawa Red Diamonds; RB Omiya Ardija
- First meeting: 19 December 1987; Emperor's Cup; Mitsubishi Heavy Industries 1–0 NTT Kanto
- Latest meeting: 10 October 2026; Emperor's Cup; Urawa Red Diamonds 3-2 Omiya Ardija
- Stadiums: Saitama Stadium 2002; Urawa Komaba Stadium; NACK5 Stadium Omiya

Statistics
- Total meetings: 39
- Most wins: Urawa Red Diamonds (23)
- Top scorer: Rafael (7)
- All-time series: Urawa Red Diamonds: 23; Draw: 7 RB Omiya Ardija: 9
- Largest victory: 22 May 2000; J.League Division 2 Omiya Ardija 0–6 Urawa Red Diamonds

The Saitama derby (さいたまダービー, Saitama dābī) is the local derby in Saitama, Japan, between fierce city rivals Urawa Red Diamonds and RB Omiya Ardija.

== History ==
Mitsubishi Heavy Industries SC was founded in 1950 by the employees of Mitsubishi Heavy Industries in Kobe, and Nippon Telegraph and Telephone Kanto SC was founded in 1969 by the employees of Nippon Telegraph and Telephone in Urawa. Mitsubishi SC moved to Tokyo in 1958, and was sold to group company Mitsubishi Motors in 1990. Mitsubishi and NTT Kanto first faced each other in 1987 but at the time it was a match between clubs from Tokyo and Saitama and not a derby match, and they had to wait until 1996 for their first Saitama derby. Mitsubishi moved to Urawa that the same place as NTT Kanto in 1992 and went professional as Urawa Red Diamonds, and NTT Kanto moved to Omiya in 1998 and went professional as Omiya Ardija. The cities of Urawa and Omiya merged to form the city of Saitama in 2001.

The Saitama derby is known as one of the most intense derby matches in Japan. The stronger rivalry between Urawa and Omiya began with Omiya's promotion to the 2005 J.League Division 1. On the 17 July 2016 derby, the Omiya's ultras displayed insulting banners for Urawa. On the 30 April 2017 derby, the Urawa's ultras kicked the buffer zone fence, destroyed the mesh covering and threw objects onto the pitch after the defeat.

== Honours ==
As of 6 May 2023

Competition	Urawa	Omiya
JSL Division 1 / J1 League	5	0
JSL Division 2 / JFL (1992–1998) / J2 League	1	1
Emperor's Cup	8	0
JSL Cup / J.League Cup	4	0
Japanese Super Cup	5	0
All Japan Senior Football Championship	0	1
Japanese Regional Football League Competition	0	1
Asian Club Championship / AFC Champions League	3	0
J.League Cup / Copa Sudamericana Championship	1	0
Total	27	3

== Statistics ==
As of 20 October 2026, competitive matches only

Competition	Played	Urawa wins	Draws	Omiya wins	Urawa goals	Omiya goals
J1 League	24	9	7	8	31	23
J2 League	4	3	0	1	8	1
Emperor's Cup	5	5	0	0	13	5
J.League Cup	6	6	0	0	17	6
Total	39	23	7	9	69	35

== Matches ==
=== J1 League ===
#	Date	Home scorers	Home	Result	Away	Away scorers	Report
1	9 July 2005	Tulio	Urawa	1–2	Omiya	Toninho, Sakurai	Report
2	22 October 2005	Sakurai	Omiya	1–3	Urawa	Santos, Tulio, Marić	Report
3	29 April 2006	Washington, Nagai	Urawa	2–0	Omiya		Report
4	10 September 2006		Omiya	0–2	Urawa	Washington, Nagai	Report
5	6 May 2007	Kobayashi	Omiya	1–1	Urawa	Washington	Report
6	1 September 2007		Urawa	0–1	Omiya	Morita	Report
7	20 April 2008		Urawa	0–0	Omiya		Report
8	21 September 2008		Omiya	0–1	Urawa	Takahara	Report
9	24 May 2009	Park	Omiya	1–1	Urawa	Hosogai	Report
10	25 October 2009		Urawa	0–3	Omiya	Rafael (2), Ishihara	Report
11	31 July 2010		Urawa	0–1	Omiya	Rafael	Report
12	2 October 2010	Rafael	Omiya	1–2	Urawa	Takasaki, Kashiwagi	Report
13	11 June 2011	Rafael, Fukaya	Omiya	2–2	Urawa	Edmílson, Haraguchi	Report
14	15 October 2011		Urawa	0–1	Omiya	Rafael	Report
15	21 April 2012	Cho, Rafael	Omiya	2–0	Urawa		Report
16	1 September 2012	Haraguchi	Urawa	1–1	Omiya	Higashi	Report
17	20 April 2013	Zlatan	Omiya	1–0	Urawa		Report
18	5 October 2013	Abe, Haraguchi, Koroki, Sekiguchi	Urawa	4–0	Omiya		Report
19	10 May 2014		Omiya	0–2	Urawa	Koroki, Kashiwagi	Report
20	30 August 2014	Umesaki, Koroki, Moriwaki, Ugajin	Urawa	4–0	Omiya		Report
21	8 May 2016		Omiya	0–1	Urawa	Kashiwagi	Report
22	17 July 2016	Kashiwagi, Muto	Urawa	2–2	Omiya	Esaka, Mateus	Report
23	30 April 2017	Barada	Omiya	1–0	Urawa		Report
24	5 August 2017	Koroki, Kashiwagi	Urawa	2–2	Omiya	Mateus, Segawa	Report

=== J2 League ===
#	Date	Home scorers	Home	Result	Away	Away scorers	Report
1	25 March 2000	Ono	Urawa	1–0	Omiya		Report
2	22 May 2000		Omiya	0–6	Urawa	Nagai, Oshiba, Kubica, unknown (o.g.), Miyazawa, unknown (o.g.)	Report
3	16 September 2000		Urawa	0–1	Omiya	Jorginho	Report
4	16 November 2000		Omiya	0–1	Urawa	Oshiba	Report

=== Emperor's Cup ===
#	Date	Home scorers	Home	Result	Away	Away scorers	Report
1	19 December 1987	unknown	Mitsubishi	1–0	NTT Kanto	unknown	Report
2	17 November 1996	Okano (2), Iwase	Urawa	3–0	NTT Kanto		Report
3	14 December 1997	Petrović, Fukunaga	Urawa	2–1	NTT Kanto	Hiramoto	Report
4	29 December 2005	Kataoka, Tomita	Omiya	2–4 (a.e.t.)	Urawa	Marić, Hasebe (2), No. Yamada	Report
5	7 October 2026	Onaiwu , Hidano, Sasa	Urawa	3–2	Omiya	Izumi, Kobayashi	Report

=== J.League Cup ===
#	Date	Home scorers	Home	Result	Away	Away scorers	Report
1	26 March 2005	Tanaka, Emerson	Urawa	2–1	Omiya	Tomita	Report
2	4 June 2005	Tuto	Omiya	1–3	Urawa	Suzuki, Emerson, Tanaka	Report
3	13 June 2009	Na. Yamada, Edmílson (2), Takahara, Haraguchi, No. Yamada	Urawa	6–2	Omiya	Tokita, Fujita	Report
4	14 September 2011	Márcio Richardes, Haraguchi	Urawa	2–0	Omiya		Report
5	28 September 2011	Kanazawa	Omiya	1–2	Urawa	Despotović (2)	Report
6	2 April 2014	Lee, Aoki	Urawa	2–1	Omiya	Hashimoto	Report

== Goalscorers ==
As of 5 August 2017, competitive matches only

Rank	Player	Club	Goals
1	(Brazil) Rafael	Omiya	7
2	(Japan) Genki Haraguchi	Urawa	5
2	(Japan) Yosuke Kashiwagi	Urawa	5
4	(Japan) Shinzo Koroki	Urawa	4
5	(Brazil) Edmílson	Urawa	3
5	(Japan) Yuichiro Nagai	Urawa	3
5	(Brazil) Washington	Urawa	3
8	(Serbia) Ranko Despotović	Urawa	2
8	(Brazil) Emerson	Urawa	2
8	(Japan) Makoto Hasebe	Urawa	2
8	(Croatia) Tomislav Marić	Urawa	2
8	(Brazil) Mateus	Omiya	2
8	(Japan) Masayuki Okano	Urawa	2
8	(Japan) Kenji Oshiba	Urawa	2
8	(Japan) Naoto Sakurai	Urawa; Omiya	2
8	(Japan) Naohiro Takahara	Urawa	2
8	(Japan) Marcus Tulio Tanaka	Urawa	2
8	(Japan) Tatsuya Tanaka	Urawa	2
8	(Japan) Daisuke Tomita	Omiya	2
8	(Japan) Nobuhisa Yamada	Urawa	2

== Players who played for both clubs ==
Player	Urawa	Omiya
(Japan) Akihiro Kameda	1992	1989–1991
(Japan) Yuki Takita	1992–2000	1990–1992
(Japan) Seiichi Makita	1993	1991–1992
(Japan) Hiroki Aratani	1994–1997	1999–2008
(Japan) Ken Iwase	1994–1998	1998–2002
(Japan) Naoto Sakurai	1994–1999	2005–2008
(Japan) Tomoyasu Ando	1997, 1998–2002	2002–2006
(Japan) Kohei Morita	1999–2000	2002–2004
(Brazil) Tuto	2001–2002	2004–2005
(Japan) Takuro Nishimura	2001–2004	2004–2008
(Japan) Nobuhiro Kato	2003–2014	2015–2018
(Japan) Mizuki Hamada	2009–2012, 2014	2024–
(Japan) Shinya Yajima	2011–2014, 2017	2022
(Japan) Takuya Aoki	2014–2020	2008–2013
(Japan) Rikiya Motegi	2015, 2018–2019	2022–
(Japan) Naoki Ishihara	2015–2016	2009–2011
(Slovenia) Zlatan Ljubijankić	2015–2018	2012–2014
(Japan) Kenyu Sugimoto	2019–2021	2024–
(Japan) Hidetoshi Takeda	2020–2021, 2024	2022
(Japan) Hitoshi Shiota	2021	2015–2019
(Japan) Ataru Esaka	2021–2022	2016–2017
(Japan) Kazuaki Mawatari	2022–2023	2021
(Japan) Tetsuya Chinen	2022–2023	2024
