= Koichi Sugiyama (footballer) =

Japanese footballer and manager

Koichi Sugiyama 杉山 弘一
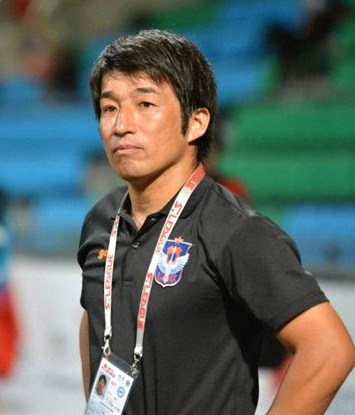
- Sugiyama managing Albirex Niigata (S) in 2011

Personal information
- Full name: Koichi Sugiyama
- Date of birth: October 27, 1971 (age 55)
- Place of birth: Takatsuki, Osaka, Japan
- Height: 1.76 m (5 ft 9 in)
- Position: Defender

Team information
- Current team: Kyoto Sanga (Assistant Manager)

Youth career
- 1987–1989: Takatsuki Minami High School

College career
Years	Team	Apps	(Gls)
1990–1993	Osaka University of Commerce		

Senior career*
Years	Team	Apps	(Gls)
1994–1998	Urawa Reds	106	(1)
1999–2002	Tokyo Verdy	63	(1)
2003	Albirex Niigata	6	(0)
Total		175	(2)

Managerial career
- 2004–2009: Urawa Red Diamonds (youth)
- 2010–2013: Albirex Niigata (S)
- 2014: Ayutthaya
- 2015: Kashiwa Reysol (assistant)
- 2016: BBCU
- 2016: Chainat Hornbill
- 2017–2018: Blaublitz Akita
- 2019: Nara Club
- 2021–: Kyoto Sanga (assistant)
- * Club domestic league appearances and goals

Koichi Sugiyama (杉山 弘一, Sugiyama Koichi; born October 27, 1971) is a former Japanese football player and manager. He is currently the assistant manager of J1 League club, Kyoto Sanga.

== Playing career ==
=== Urawa Red Diamonds ===
Sugiyama was born in Takatsuki on October 27, 1971. After graduating from Osaka University of Commerce, he joined Urawa Red Diamonds in 1994. He became a regular player as a left back in the first season. However his opportunity to play decreased which he was dropped for Shinji Jojo from the 1997 season and he didn't get the to featured in all of the club matches in 1998.

=== Verdy Kawasaki (later renamed as Tokyo Verdy) ===
In 1999, he moved to Verdy Kawasaki (later Tokyo Verdy). Sugiyama became a regular player in the club with many young players due to financial strain end of 1998 season. However his opportunity to play decreased from 2001.

=== Albirex Niigata ===
In 2003, he moved to J2 League club Albirex Niigata. However he could hardly play in the match and he retired at the end of the 2003 season.

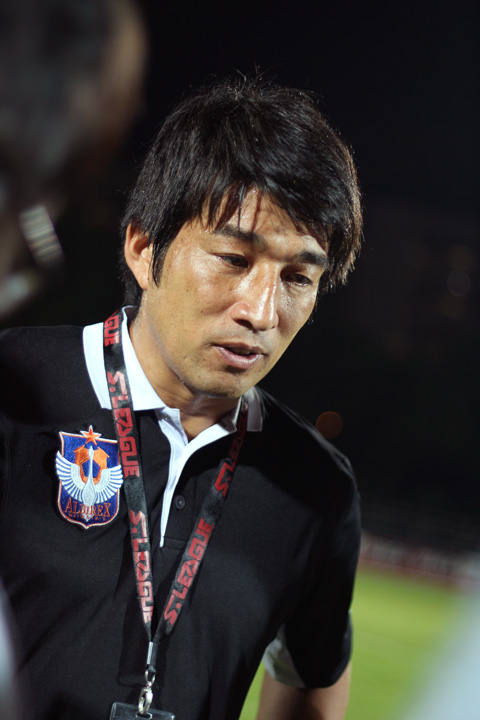
Koichi Sugiyama in a post-match interview after a thrilling victory against Hougang United on 13 April 2012 at Hougang Stadium.

== Coaching career ==
=== Urawa Red Diamonds ===
Sugiyama was the academy coach of Urawa Red Diamonds from 2004 until 2009

=== Albirex Niigata Singapore ===
Sugiyama moved to Singapore and was named as the head coach of Albirex Niigata Singapore from 2010 until 2013. During his time in Singapore, he won the S.League Coach Of The Year award in 2011, the same year he guided his team to win the Singapore League Cup and finalist of the Singapore Cup.

=== Ayutthaya ===
In August 2014, he moved to Thailand to signed with Thai Division 1 League club, Ayutthaya and managed the club until November.

=== Kashiwa Reysol ===
In 2015, he returned to Japan and became the assistant manager under Tatsuma Yoshida at J1 League club, Kashiwa Reysol until the end of the season.

=== BBCU ===
On 22 February 2016, he returned to Thailand and signed with 2016 Thai League T1 club, BBCU.

=== Chainat Hornbill ===
On 28 April 2016, he moved to Chainat Hornbill and managed the club until the end of the season.

=== Blaublitz Akita ===
In 2017, he returned to Japan and signed with J3 League club Blaublitz Akita. In Sugiyama first year at the club, he guided them to win the 2017 J3 League title however due to the club not having a license to play in the upper-tier football, they were not promoted, becoming the first professional third-tier champion not to get promoted. The club results were bad in 2018 season and Sugiyama was sacked in July 2018.

=== Nara Club ===
In 2019, he signed with Japan Football League club Nara Club.

=== Kyoto Sanga ===
In 2021, Sugiyama joined J2 League side, Kyoto Sanga and become the assistant manager under Cho Kwi-jae. In his first season at the club, he sees them finishing second in the 2021 J2 League and saw the club promoted to the top tier of Japanese football, the 2022 J1 League.

== Career statistics ==
=== Club ===
Appearances and goals by club, season and competition
Club	Season	League			Emperor's Cup		J.League Cup		Total	
Club	Season	Division	Apps	Goals	Apps	Goals	Apps	Goals	Apps	Goals
Urawa Reds	1994	J1 League	31	0	3	0	1	0	35	0
Urawa Reds	1995	J1 League	44	1	1	0	-		45	1
Urawa Reds	1996	J1 League	23	0	3	0	9	0	35	0
Urawa Reds	1997	J1 League	8	0	2	0	3	0	13	0
Urawa Reds	1998	J1 League	0	0	0	0	0	0	0	0
Verdy Kawasaki	1999	J1 League	26	1	4	0	4	0	34	1
Verdy Kawasaki	2000	J1 League	25	0	0	0	5	0	30	0
Tokyo Verdy	2001	J1 League	11	0	3	0	0	0	14	0
Tokyo Verdy	2002	J1 League	1	0	0	0	3	0	4	0
Albirex Niigata	2003	J2 League	6	0	1	0	-		7	0
Career total			175	2	17	0	25	0	217	2

=== Managerial ===
Season	club	League								Cup	
Season	club	rank	game	point	win	draw	lost	goal	goallost	League Cup	Singapore Cup
2010	Albirex Niigata Singapore	7/12teams	33	37	9	10	14	31	42	first round	quarter final
2011	Albirex Niigata Singapore	4/12teams	33	65	20	5	8	80	34	Champion	runners-up
2012	Albirex Niigata Singapore	3/13teams	24	43	12	7	5	37	26	quarter final	quarter final
2013	Albirex Niigata Singapore	3/12teams	27	46	13	7	7	36	28	semi final	first round
2014	AyuttayaFC(Thai 2)	11→6	10	19	6	1	3	18	12	2014.8-2014.11	
2016	BBCU(Thai 1)	18	3	7	1	0	6	11	19	Feb→Apr	
2016	ChainatFC(Thai 1)	17	6	8	1	3	4	9	14	Apr→Jun	
2017	Blaublitz Akita(J3)	Champion	32	61	18	7	7	53	31		first round
2018	Blaublitz Akita(J3)	8/17teams	16	21	6	3	7	15	54	Jan→Jul	first round
2019	Nara Club (JFL)	14	34	30	8	10	12	27	32		
total			220		94	53	73	317	252	-	1st Round

== Honours ==
=== Club ===
Albirex Niigata Singapore

Singapore League Cup: 2011

Blaublitz Akita

J3 League: 2017
