= Hisashi Tsuchida =

Japanese footballer

Hisashi Tsuchida 土田 尚史
Personal information
- Full name: Hisashi Tsuchida
- Date of birth: February 1, 1967 (age 59)
- Place of birth: Okayama, Japan
- Height: 1.87 m (6 ft 1 1/2 in)
- Position: Goalkeeper

Youth career
- 1982–1984: Okayama University of Science High School
- 1985–1988: Osaka University of Economics

Senior career*
Years	Team	Apps	(Gls)
1989–2000	Urawa Red Diamonds	150	(0)
Total		150	(0)
- * Club domestic league appearances and goals

Hisashi Tsuchida (土田 尚史, Tsuchida Hisashi; born February 1, 1967) is a former Japanese football player.

== Club career ==
Tsuchida was born in Okayama on February 1, 1967. After graduating from Osaka University of Economics, he joined Japan Soccer League club Mitsubishi Motors (later Urawa Reds) in 1989. He played many matches as goalkeeper from 1991. In 1992, the Japan Soccer League folded and a new league was founded J1 League. He battled with Yuki Takita for the position for a long time. He played as the regular goalkeeper in 1994 and 1995. However he lost his regular position due to injury in 1996, and his opportunity to play decreased from 1997. He could not play at all in the matches from 1999. He retired with rival Takita at the end of the 2000 season.

== National team career ==
In 1988, when Tsuchida was an Osaka University of Economics student, he was selected by the Japan national "B team" for the 1988 Asian Cup. At this competition, he played one game. However, the Japan Football Association doesn't count it as a Japan national team match due to it being a "B team" not "the first team".

== Club statistics ==
Club performance			League		Cup		League Cup		Total	
Season	Club	League	Apps	Goals	Apps	Goals	Apps	Goals	Apps	Goals
Japan			League		Emperor's Cup		J.League Cup		Total	
1989/90	Mitsubishi Motors	JSL Division 2	3	0	0	0	0	0	3	0
1990/91	Mitsubishi Motors	JSL Division 1	1	0	0	0	0	0	1	0
1991/92	Mitsubishi Motors	JSL Division 1	12	0	3	0	1	0	16	0
1992	Urawa Red Diamonds	J1 League	-		4	0	9	0	13	0
1993	Urawa Red Diamonds	J1 League	13	0	0	0	0	0	13	0
1994	Urawa Red Diamonds	J1 League	43	0	3	0	2	0	48	0
1995	Urawa Red Diamonds	J1 League	47	0	3	0	-		50	0
1996	Urawa Red Diamonds	J1 League	0	0	0	0	0	0	0	0
1997	Urawa Red Diamonds	J1 League	14	0	2	0	2	0	18	0
1998	Urawa Red Diamonds	J1 League	17	0	0	0	4	0	21	0
1999	Urawa Red Diamonds	J1 League	0	0	0	0	0	0	0	0
2000	Urawa Red Diamonds	J2 League	0	0	0	0	0	0	0	0
Total			150	0	15	0	18	0	183	0
