= Toshiya Ishii =

Japanese footballer

Toshiya Ishii 石井 俊也
Personal information
- Full name: Toshiya Ishii
- Date of birth: January 19, 1978 (age 48)
- Place of birth: Fujieda, Shizuoka, Japan
- Height: 1.73 m (5 ft 8 in)
- Position: Midfielder

Youth career
- 1993–1995: Shizuoka Gakuen High School

Senior career*
Years	Team	Apps	(Gls)
1996–2002	Urawa Reds	141	(2)
2003–2004	Vegalta Sendai	42	(0)
2005–2008	Kyoto Sanga FC	72	(1)
2009	Roasso Kumamoto	43	(3)
2010–2013	Fujieda MYFC	83	(1)
Total		381	(7)
Medal record
Urawa Reds
Runner-up	J.League Cup	2002
- * Club domestic league appearances and goals

Toshiya Ishii (石井 俊也, Ishii Toshiya; born January 19, 1978) is a former Japanese football player.

== Playing career ==
Ishii was born on January 19, 1978, in Fujieda. After graduating from Shizuoka Gakuen High School, he joined J.League club Urawa Reds in 1996. He became a regular as a defensive midfielder in 1998, making 32 league appearances that season, and remained a regular through 2001. His playing time decreased in 2002, and in 2003 he moved to Vegalta Sendai. He was a regular in 2003 but played less in 2004. In 2005 he moved to Kyoto Purple Sanga (renamed Kyoto Sanga FC in 2007). He played few matches until early 2006 but became a regular from late 2006, making 44 league appearances in 2007. After the club added several players for 2008, including Yuto Sato and Sidiclei, he made no league appearances that season. In 2009 he moved to Roasso Kumamoto, where he played 43 league matches, but he was released at the end of the season. In 2010 he joined his hometown club Fujieda MYFC in the Regional Leagues. He was a regular there, and the club was promoted to the Japan Football League for 2012. He retired at the end of the 2013 season.

== Club statistics ==
Club performance			League		Cup		League Cup		Total	
Season	Club	League	Apps	Goals	Apps	Goals	Apps	Goals	Apps	Goals
Japan			League		Emperor's Cup		J.League Cup		Total	
1996	Urawa Reds	J1 League	0	0	0	0	0	0	0	0
1997	Urawa Reds	J1 League	0	0	2	0	0	0	2	0
1998	Urawa Reds	J1 League	32	1	2	0	4	0	38	1
1999	Urawa Reds	J1 League	30	0	1	0	2	0	33	0
2000	Urawa Reds	J2 League	39	0	4	0	2	0	45	0
2001	Urawa Reds	J1 League	30	0	0	0	6	0	36	0
2002	Urawa Reds	J1 League	10	1	1	0	7	0	18	1
2003	Vegalta Sendai	J1 League	26	0	0	0	6	0	32	0
2004	Vegalta Sendai	J2 League	16	0	0	0	-		16	0
2005	Kyoto Purple Sanga	J2 League	11	0	1	0	-		12	0
2006	Kyoto Purple Sanga	J1 League	17	0	1	0	2	0	20	0
2007	Kyoto Sanga FC	J2 League	44	1	0	0	-		44	1
2008	Kyoto Sanga FC	J1 League	0	0	0	0	1	0	1	0
2009	Roasso Kumamoto	J2 League	43	3	0	0	-		43	3
2010	Fujieda MYFC	Regional Leagues	15	1	0	0	-		15	1
2011	Fujieda MYFC	Regional Leagues	11	0	0	0	-		11	0
2012	Fujieda MYFC	Football League	28	1	0	0	-		28	1
2013	Fujieda MYFC	Football League	29	0	2	0	-		31	0
Total			381	8	14	0	30	0	425	8
