= 1998 Urawa Red Diamonds season =

Urawa Red Diamonds
1998 season
- Manager: (Japan) Hiromi Hara
- Stadium: Urawa Komaba Stadium
- J.League: 6th
- Emperor's Cup: Quarterfinals
- J.League Cup: GL-A 2nd
- Top goalscorer: (Japan) Kenji Oshiba (14)
Home colours	Away colours

1998 Urawa Red Diamonds season

== Competitions ==
Competitions	Position
J.League	6th / 18 clubs
Emperor's Cup	Quarterfinals
J.League Cup	GL-A 2nd / 5 clubs

== Domestic results ==
=== J.League ===
21 March 1998 1-1	Urawa Red Diamonds	3-2	JEF United Ichihara	Urawa Komaba Stadium
JST (UTC+09)

25 March 1998 1-2	Yokohama Flügels	0-2	Urawa Red Diamonds	International Stadium Yokohama
JST (UTC+09)

28 March 1998 1-3	Urawa Red Diamonds	1-2 (GG) (a.e.t.)	Cerezo Osaka	Urawa Komaba Stadium
JST (UTC+09)

4 April 1998 1-4	Sanfrecce Hiroshima	1-2	Urawa Red Diamonds	Hiroshima Stadium
JST (UTC+09)

11 April 1998 1-5	Urawa Red Diamonds	2-2 (GG) (a.e.t.) (5-4 p)	Avispa Fukuoka	Urawa Komaba Stadium
JST (UTC+09)

15 April 1998 1-6	Consadole Sapporo	2-0	Urawa Red Diamonds	Sendai Stadium
JST (UTC+09)

18 April 1998 1-7	Urawa Red Diamonds	0-2	Shimizu S-Pulse	Urawa Komaba Stadium
JST (UTC+09)

25 April 1998 1-8	Kashima Antlers	1-4	Urawa Red Diamonds	Kashima Soccer Stadium
JST (UTC+09)

29 April 1998 1-9	Urawa Red Diamonds	3-1	Kashiwa Reysol	Tokyo National Stadium
JST (UTC+09)

2 May 1998 1-10	Gamba Osaka	0-2	Urawa Red Diamonds	Osaka Expo '70 Stadium
JST (UTC+09)

5 May 1998 1-11	Urawa Red Diamonds	0-1	Yokohama Marinos	Urawa Komaba Stadium
JST (UTC+09)

9 May 1998 1-12	Urawa Red Diamonds	2-1 (GG) (a.e.t.)	Kyoto Purple Sanga	Tokyo National Stadium
JST (UTC+09)

25 July 1998 1-13	Nagoya Grampus Eight	3-1	Urawa Red Diamonds	Mizuho Athletic Stadium
JST (UTC+09)

29 July 1998 1-14	Urawa Red Diamonds	2-1	Bellmare Hiratsuka	Urawa Komaba Stadium
JST (UTC+09)

1 August 1998 1-15	Júbilo Iwata	2-0	Urawa Red Diamonds	Júbilo Iwata Stadium
JST (UTC+09)

5 August 1998 1-16	Urawa Red Diamonds	1-1 (GG) (a.e.t.) (4-2 p)	Verdy Kawasaki	Urawa Komaba Stadium
JST (UTC+09)

8 August 1998 1-17	Vissel Kobe	1-5	Urawa Red Diamonds	Kobe Universiade Memorial Stadium
JST (UTC+09)

22 August 1998 2-1	Bellmare Hiratsuka	0-4	Urawa Red Diamonds	Hiratsuka Athletics Stadium
JST (UTC+09)

29 August 1998 2-2	Urawa Red Diamonds	2-0	Júbilo Iwata	Urawa Komaba Stadium
JST (UTC+09)

5 September 1998 2-3	Verdy Kawasaki	0-3	Urawa Red Diamonds	Tokyo National Stadium
JST (UTC+09)

12 September 1998 2-4	Urawa Red Diamonds	2-1	Vissel Kobe	Urawa Komaba Stadium
JST (UTC+09)

15 September 1998 2-5	JEF United Ichihara	0-2	Urawa Red Diamonds	Ichihara Seaside Stadium
JST (UTC+09)

19 September 1998 2-6	Urawa Red Diamonds	3-0	Yokohama Flügels	Urawa Komaba Stadium
JST (UTC+09)

23 September 1998 2-7	Cerezo Osaka	2-1	Urawa Red Diamonds	Osaka Nagai Stadium
JST (UTC+09)

26 September 1998 2-8	Urawa Red Diamonds	1-2	Sanfrecce Hiroshima	Urawa Komaba Stadium
JST (UTC+09)

3 October 1998 2-9	Avispa Fukuoka	0-2	Urawa Red Diamonds	Hakatanomori Football Stadium
JST (UTC+09)

14 October 1998 2-10	Urawa Red Diamonds	2-1	Consadole Sapporo	Urawa Komaba Stadium
JST (UTC+09)

17 October 1998 2-11	Shimizu S-Pulse	1-0 (GG) (a.e.t.)	Urawa Red Diamonds	Nihondaira Sports Stadium
JST (UTC+09)

21 October 1998 2-12	Urawa Red Diamonds	2-3 (GG) (a.e.t.)	Kashima Antlers	Tokyo National Stadium
JST (UTC+09)

24 October 1998 2-13	Kashiwa Reysol	2-0	Urawa Red Diamonds	Tokyo National Stadium
JST (UTC+09)

31 October 1998 2-14	Urawa Red Diamonds	1-0	Gamba Osaka	Urawa Komaba Stadium
JST (UTC+09)

3 November 1998 2-15	Yokohama Marinos	3-2	Urawa Red Diamonds	Tokyo National Stadium
JST (UTC+09)

7 November 1998 2-16	Kyoto Purple Sanga	1-3	Urawa Red Diamonds	Nishikyogoku Athletic Stadium
JST (UTC+09)

14 November 1998 2-17	Urawa Red Diamonds	2-1	Nagoya Grampus Eight	Urawa Komaba Stadium
JST (UTC+09)

=== Emperor's Cup ===
1st Round	bye

2nd Round	bye

13 December 1998 3rd Round	Urawa Red Diamonds	4-1	Albirex Niigata	Urawa Komaba Stadium
JST (UTC+09)

20 December 1998 4th Round	Urawa Red Diamonds	3-1	Kashiwa Reysol	Urawa Komaba Stadium
JST (UTC+09)

23 December 1998 Quarterfinals	Urawa Red Diamonds	0-1	Shimizu S-Pulse	Kagawa Marugame Stadium
JST (UTC+09)

=== J.League Cup ===
16 May 1998 GL-A-1	Júbilo Iwata	1-2	Urawa Red Diamonds	Niigata City Athletic Stadium
JST (UTC+09)

23 May 1998 GL-A-2	Urawa Red Diamonds	1-1	Verdy Kawasaki	Urawa Komaba Stadium
JST (UTC+09)

30 May 1998 GL-A-3	Urawa Red Diamonds	6-0	Brummel Sendai	Urawa Komaba Stadium
JST (UTC+09)

3 June 1998 GL-A-4	Sanfrecce Hiroshima	1-1	Urawa Red Diamonds	Hiroshima Stadium
JST (UTC+09)

GL-A-5	bye

== Player statistics ==
No.	Pos.	Nat.	Player	D.o.B. (Age)	Height / Weight	J.League		Emperor's Cup		J.League Cup		Total	
No.	Pos.	Nat.	Player	D.o.B. (Age)	Height / Weight	Apps	Goals	Apps	Goals	Apps	Goals	Apps	Goals
1	GK	(Japan)	Hisashi Tsuchida	February 1, 1967 (aged 31)	cm / kg	17	0						
2	DF	(Japan)	Nobuhisa Yamada	September 10, 1975 (aged 22)	cm / kg	34	0						
3	DF	(Japan)	Tsutomu Nishino	March 13, 1971 (aged 27)	cm / kg	27	2						
4	MF	(Japan)	Masaki Tsuchihashi	July 23, 1972 (aged 25)	cm / kg	20	0						
5	DF	(Netherlands)	Alfred Nijhuis	March 23, 1966 (aged 31)	cm / kg	11	2						
5	DF	(Italy)	Giuseppe Zappella	May 4, 1973 (aged 24)	cm / kg	21	3						
6	MF	(Serbia and Montenegro)	Željko Petrović	November 13, 1965 (aged 32)	cm / kg	27	2						
7	FW	(Japan)	Masayuki Okano	July 25, 1972 (aged 25)	cm / kg	34	7						
8	MF	(Japan)	Osamu Hirose	June 6, 1965 (aged 32)	cm / kg	23	0						
9	FW	(Japan)	Masahiro Fukuda	December 17, 1966 (aged 31)	cm / kg	17	7						
10	MF	(Japan)	Yasushi Fukunaga	March 6, 1973 (aged 25)	cm / kg	31	4						
11	MF	(Spain)	Txiki Begiristain	August 12, 1964 (aged 33)	cm / kg	30	9						
12	MF	(Japan)	Takafumi Hori	September 10, 1967 (aged 30)	cm / kg	4	1						
13	FW	(Japan)	Kenji Oshiba	November 19, 1973 (aged 24)	cm / kg	30	14						
14	MF	(Japan)	Hiromitsu Isogai	April 19, 1969 (aged 28)	cm / kg	0	0						
15	DF	(Japan)	Koichi Sugiyama	October 27, 1971 (aged 26)	cm / kg	0	0						
16	GK	(Japan)	Yuki Takita	May 16, 1967 (aged 30)	cm / kg	17	0						
17	FW	(Japan)	Yuichiro Nagai	February 14, 1979 (aged 19)	cm / kg	3	0						
18	MF	(Japan)	Nobuyasu Ikeda	May 18, 1970 (aged 27)	cm / kg	6	0						
19	DF	(Japan)	Hideki Uchidate	January 15, 1974 (aged 24)	cm / kg	0	0						
20	FW	(Japan)	Naoto Sakurai	September 2, 1975 (aged 22)	cm / kg	5	0						
21	MF	(Japan)	Toshiya Ishii	January 19, 1978 (aged 20)	cm / kg	32	1						
22	DF	(Japan)	Shinji Jojo	August 28, 1977 (aged 20)	cm / kg	22	0						
23	DF	(Japan)	Akihiro Tabata	May 15, 1978 (aged 19)	cm / kg	5	0						
24	DF	(Japan)	Yoshinori Taguchi	September 14, 1965 (aged 32)	cm / kg	1	0						
25	MF	(Japan)	Ken Iwase	July 8, 1975 (aged 22)	cm / kg	0	0						
26	FW	(Japan)	Taichi Sato	August 23, 1977 (aged 20)	cm / kg	0	0						
27	DF	(Japan)	Atsuo Watanabe	April 15, 1974 (aged 23)	cm / kg	10	0						
28	MF	(Japan)	Shinji Ono	September 27, 1979 (aged 18)	cm / kg	27	9						
29	DF	(Japan)	Toru Ojima	February 22, 1976 (aged 22)	cm / kg	0	0						
30	GK	(Japan)	Koji Homma	April 27, 1977 (aged 20)	cm / kg	0	0						
32	GK	(Japan)	Tomoyasu Ando	May 23, 1974 (aged 23)	cm / kg	0	0						
33	MF	(Japan)	Ryuji Kawai	July 14, 1978 (aged 19)	cm / kg	0	0						
34	DF	(Japan)	Takashi Sambonsuge	June 5, 1978 (aged 19)	cm / kg	0	0						
35	DF	(Japan)	Takashi Miki	May 7, 1979 (aged 18)	cm / kg	0	0						
36	MF	(Japan)	Kenichiro Kashima	February 8, 1980 (aged 18)	cm / kg	0	0						

== Other pages ==
- (in Japanese) J.League official site
