= 1999 Urawa Red Diamonds season =

Urawa Red Diamonds
1999 season
- Manager: Hiromi Hara; De Mos; Yasushi Yoshida
- Stadium: Urawa Komaba Stadium
- J.League 1: 15th
- Emperor's Cup: 4th Round
- J.League Cup: Quarterfinals
- Top goalscorer: Masahiro Fukuda (13)
Home colours	Away colours

1999 Urawa Red Diamonds season

== Competitions ==
Competitions	Position
J.League 1	15th / 16 clubs
Emperor's Cup	4th round
J.League Cup	Quarterfinals

== Domestic results ==
=== J.League 1 ===
6 March 1999 1-1	Urawa Red Diamonds	2-1	Gamba Osaka	Urawa Komaba Stadium
JST (UTC+09)

13 March 1999 1-2	JEF United Ichihara	0-0 (GG) (a.e.t.)	Urawa Red Diamonds	Ichihara Seaside Stadium
JST (UTC+09)

20 March 1999 1-3	Urawa Red Diamonds	0-0 (GG) (a.e.t.)	Vissel Kobe	Urawa Komaba Stadium
JST (UTC+09)

27 March 1999 1-4	Sanfrecce Hiroshima	4-1	Urawa Red Diamonds	Hiroshima Big Arch
JST (UTC+09)

3 April 1999 1-5	Urawa Red Diamonds	2-2 (GG) (a.e.t.)	Verdy Kawasaki	Urawa Komaba Stadium
JST (UTC+09)

10 April 1999 1-6	Bellmare Hiratsuka	0-3	Urawa Red Diamonds	Tokyo National Stadium
JST (UTC+09)

17 April 1999 1-7	Urawa Red Diamonds	0-1	Kyoto Purple Sanga	Urawa Komaba Stadium
JST (UTC+09)

24 April 1999 1-8	Kashiwa Reysol	3-1	Urawa Red Diamonds	Kashiwanoha Park Stadium
JST (UTC+09)

28 April 1999 1-9	Urawa Red Diamonds	1-2 (GG) (a.e.t.)	Yokohama F. Marinos	Urawa Komaba Stadium
JST (UTC+09)

1 May 1999 1-10	Shimizu S-Pulse	2-2 (GG) (a.e.t.)	Urawa Red Diamonds	Nihondaira Sports Stadium
JST (UTC+09)

5 May 1999 1-11	Urawa Red Diamonds	2-3	Cerezo Osaka	Urawa Komaba Stadium
JST (UTC+09)

8 May 1999 1-12	Júbilo Iwata	4-3	Urawa Red Diamonds	Júbilo Iwata Stadium
JST (UTC+09)

15 May 1999 1-13	Urawa Red Diamonds	1-0	Kashima Antlers	Tokyo National Stadium
JST (UTC+09)

22 May 1999 1-14	Urawa Red Diamonds	2-3 (GG) (a.e.t.)	Avispa Fukuoka	Urawa Komaba Stadium
JST (UTC+09)

29 May 1999 1-15	Nagoya Grampus Eight	8-1	Urawa Red Diamonds	Mizuho Athletic Stadium
JST (UTC+09)

7 August 1999 2-1	Kyoto Purple Sanga	2-1	Urawa Red Diamonds	Nishikyogoku Athletic Stadium
JST (UTC+09)

14 August 1999 2-2	Urawa Red Diamonds	2-3 (GG) (a.e.t.)	Kashiwa Reysol	Urawa Komaba Stadium
JST (UTC+09)

18 August 1999 2-3	Yokohama F. Marinos	2-0	Urawa Red Diamonds	International Stadium Yokohama
JST (UTC+09)

21 August 1999 2-4	Urawa Red Diamonds	0-3	Shimizu S-Pulse	Tokyo National Stadium
JST (UTC+09)

28 August 1999 2-5	Cerezo Osaka	2-3	Urawa Red Diamonds	Osaka Nagai Stadium
JST (UTC+09)

4 September 1999 2-6	Urawa Red Diamonds	1-2 (GG) (a.e.t.)	Júbilo Iwata	Tokyo National Stadium
JST (UTC+09)

11 September 1999 2-7	Kashima Antlers	2-1 (GG) (a.e.t.)	Urawa Red Diamonds	Kashima Soccer Stadium
JST (UTC+09)

15 September 1999 2-8	Avispa Fukuoka	2-1 (GG) (a.e.t.)	Urawa Red Diamonds	Hakatanomori Football Stadium
JST (UTC+09)

18 September 1999 2-9	Urawa Red Diamonds	1-2 (GG) (a.e.t.)	Nagoya Grampus Eight	Urawa Komaba Stadium
JST (UTC+09)

23 September 1999 2-10	Gamba Osaka	1-2	Urawa Red Diamonds	Osaka Expo '70 Stadium
JST (UTC+09)

30 October 1999 2-11	Vissel Kobe	2-0	Urawa Red Diamonds	Kobe Universiade Memorial Stadium
JST (UTC+09)

17 November 1999 2-12	Urawa Red Diamonds	1-0	JEF United Ichihara	Urawa Komaba Stadium
JST (UTC+09)

20 November 1999 2-13	Urawa Red Diamonds	2-0	Bellmare Hiratsuka	Urawa Komaba Stadium
JST (UTC+09)

23 November 1999 2-14	Verdy Kawasaki	2-2 (GG) (a.e.t.)	Urawa Red Diamonds	Todoroki Athletics Stadium
JST (UTC+09)

27 November 1999 2-15	Urawa Red Diamonds	1-0 (GG) (a.e.t.)	Sanfrecce Hiroshima	Urawa Komaba Stadium
JST (UTC+09)

=== Emperor's Cup ===
1st Round	bye

2nd Round	bye

12 December 1999 3rd Round	Urawa Red Diamonds	3-1	Albirex Niigata	Urawa Komaba Stadium
JST (UTC+09)

19 December 1999 4th Round	Urawa Red Diamonds	0-2	Kashiwa Reysol	Urawa Komaba Stadium
JST (UTC+09)

=== J.League Cup ===
1st Round	bye

12 June 1999 2nd Round-1	Oita Trinita	1-0	Urawa Red Diamonds	Oita Athletic Stadium
JST (UTC+09)

19 June 1999 2nd Round-2	Urawa Red Diamonds	3-1 (3-2 agg.)	Oita Trinita	Urawa Komaba Stadium
JST (UTC+09)

20 July 1999 Quarterfinals-1	Urawa Red Diamonds	2-0	Kashima Antlers	Urawa Komaba Stadium
JST (UTC+09)

24 July 1999 Quarterfinals-2	Kashima Antlers	3-0 (GG) (a.e.t.) (3-2 agg.)	Urawa Red Diamonds	Kashima Soccer Stadium
JST (UTC+09)

== Player statistics ==
No.	Pos.	Nat.	Player	D.o.B. (Age)	Height / Weight	J.League 1		Emperor's Cup		J.League Cup		Total	
No.	Pos.	Nat.	Player	D.o.B. (Age)	Height / Weight	Apps	Goals	Apps	Goals	Apps	Goals	Apps	Goals
1	GK	(Japan)	Hisashi Tsuchida	February 1, 1967 (aged 32)	cm / kg	0	0						
2	DF	(Japan)	Nobuhisa Yamada	September 10, 1975 (aged 23)	cm / kg	29	1						
3	DF	(Japan)	Tsutomu Nishino	March 13, 1971 (aged 27)	cm / kg	9	1						
4	MF	(Japan)	Masaki Tsuchihashi	July 23, 1972 (aged 26)	cm / kg	18	1						
5	DF	(Italy)	Giuseppe Zappella	May 4, 1973 (aged 25)	cm / kg	18	1						
6	MF	(Serbia and Montenegro)	Željko Petrović	November 13, 1965 (aged 33)	cm / kg	19	1						
7	FW	(Japan)	Masayuki Okano	July 25, 1972 (aged 26)	cm / kg	11	0						
8	MF	(Japan)	Shinji Ono	September 27, 1979 (aged 19)	cm / kg	14	2						
9	FW	(Japan)	Masahiro Fukuda	December 17, 1966 (aged 32)	cm / kg	23	13						
10	MF	(Japan)	Yasushi Fukunaga	March 6, 1973 (aged 26)	cm / kg	14	3						
11	MF	(Spain)	Txiki Begiristain	August 12, 1964 (aged 34)	cm / kg	16	3						
12	DF	(Japan)	Atsuo Watanabe	April 15, 1974 (aged 24)	cm / kg	6	0						
13	FW	(Japan)	Kenji Oshiba	November 19, 1973 (aged 25)	cm / kg	18	2						
14	MF	(Japan)	Nobuyasu Ikeda	May 18, 1970 (aged 28)	cm / kg	15	1						
15	DF	(Japan)	Kohei Morita	July 13, 1976 (aged 22)	cm / kg	19	0						
16	GK	(Japan)	Yuki Takita	May 16, 1967 (aged 31)	cm / kg	30	0						
17	GK	(Japan)	Tomoyasu Ando	May 23, 1974 (aged 24)	cm / kg	0	0						
18	MF	(Japan)	Osamu Hirose	June 6, 1965 (aged 33)	cm / kg	13	0						
19	DF	(Japan)	Hideki Uchidate	January 15, 1974 (aged 25)	cm / kg	9	0						
20	FW	(Japan)	Naoto Sakurai	September 2, 1975 (aged 23)	cm / kg	4	0						
21	MF	(Japan)	Toshiya Ishii	January 19, 1978 (aged 21)	cm / kg	30	0						
22	DF	(Japan)	Shinji Jojo	August 28, 1977 (aged 21)	cm / kg	18	1						
23	DF	(Japan)	Akihiro Tabata	May 15, 1978 (aged 20)	cm / kg	0	0						
24	DF	(Japan)	Takashi Sambonsuge	June 5, 1978 (aged 20)	cm / kg	0	0						
25	DF	(Japan)	Toru Ojima	February 22, 1976 (aged 23)	cm / kg	0	0						
26	MF	(Japan)	Ryuji Kawai	July 14, 1978 (aged 20)	cm / kg	0	0						
27	DF	(Japan)	Manabu Ikeda	July 3, 1980 (aged 18)	cm / kg	17	2						
28	MF	(Japan)	Katsuyuki Miyazawa	September 15, 1976 (aged 22)	cm / kg	3	1						
29	MF	(Japan)	Tomoyuki Yoshino	July 9, 1980 (aged 18)	cm / kg	7	0						
30	GK	(Japan)	Koji Homma	April 27, 1977 (aged 21)	cm / kg	0	0						
30	FW	(Japan)	Yuichiro Nagai	February 14, 1979 (aged 20)	cm / kg	12	3						
31	GK	(Japan)	Yohei Nishibe	December 1, 1980 (aged 18)	cm / kg	0	0						
32	MF	(Japan)	Genichi Takahashi	June 28, 1980 (aged 18)	cm / kg	1	0						
33	DF	(Japan)	Tadashi Nakamura	June 10, 1971 (aged 27)	cm / kg	15	0						
34	DF	(Japan)	Ryuji Michiki	August 25, 1973 (aged 25)	cm / kg	15	0						
35	DF	(Uruguay)	Fernando Picun	February 14, 1972 (aged 27)	cm / kg	4	0						
37	DF	(Japan)	Yusuke Nakatani	September 22, 1978 (aged 20)	cm / kg	1	0						

== Other pages ==
- (in Japanese) J.League official site
