= 1996 Urawa Red Diamonds season =

Urawa Red Diamonds
1996 season
- Manager: Holger Osieck
- Stadium: Urawa Komaba Stadium
- J.League: 6th
- Emperor's Cup: Semifinals
- J.League Cup: GL-A 7th
- Top goalscorer: League: Masayuki Okano (11); All: Masayuki Okano (15)
- Highest home attendance: 20,614 (vs Gamba Osaka, 3 April 1996); 50,974 (vs Kyoto Purple Sanga, 15 May 1996, Tokyo National Stadium)
- Lowest home attendance: 17,789 (vs Cerezo Osaka, 1 May 1996); 5,611 (vs Avispa Fukuoka, 28 September 1996, Sapporo Atsubetsu Stadium)
- Average home league attendance: 24,329
Home colours	Away colours

1996 Urawa Red Diamonds season

== Review and events ==
=== League results summary ===
Overall								Home						Away					
Pld	W	D	L	GF	GA	GD	Pts	W	D	L	GF	GA	GD	W	D	L	GF	GA	GD
30	19	0	11	51	31	+20	59	11	0	4	25	11	+14	8	0	7	26	20	+6

Source: J.LEAGUE OFFICIAL GUIDE 1997. ISBN 4-09-102329-0.

=== League results by round ===
Round	1	2	3	4	5	6	7	8	9	10	11	12	13	14	15	16	17	18	19	20	21	22	23	24	25	26	27	28	29	30
Ground	H	A	H	A	H	H	A	H	A	A	H	H	A	H	A	A	H	A	H	A	H	A	H	A	A	H	A	H	A	H
Result	W	W	W	W	W	L	L	W	L	W	L	W	W	W	L	W	W	L	W	W	W	W	L	L	W	W	L	L	L	W
Position	5	6	4	3	2	5	6	5	5	5	5	4	4	4	3	4	2	5	4	3	2	1	3	5	4	4	5	6	6	6

Source: J.LEAGUE OFFICIAL GUIDE 1997. ISBN 4-09-102329-0.
A = Away; H = Home; W = Win; D = Draw; L = Loss

== Competitions ==
Competitions	Position
J.League	6th / 16 clubs
Emperor's Cup	Semifinals
J.League Cup	GL-A 7th / 8 clubs

== Domestic results ==
=== J.League ===
16 March 1996 1	Urawa Red Diamonds	2–1	Kashiwa Reysol	Urawa Komaba Stadium
15:03 JST (UTC+09)	Fukunaga 9', 65'	J. League	Watanabe 24'	Attendance: 20,124; Referee: Naotsugu Fuse; Assistant referees: Kazuaki Hamaguchi, Hisaharu Kitamura; Fourth official: Toshimitsu Yasumoto

20 March 1996 2	Avispa Fukuoka	1–2 (V-goal) (a.e.t.)	Urawa Red Diamonds	Hakatanomori Football Stadium
14:00 JST (UTC+09)	Furube 54'	J. League	Hirose 57' 113'	Attendance: 17,323; Referee: Kenji Tanaka; Assistant referees: Yoshikazu Hiroshima, Tōru Yamashiro; Fourth official: Daikichi Kanada

23 March 1996 3	Urawa Red Diamonds	2–0	Yokohama Marinos	Tokyo National Stadium
19:03 JST (UTC+09)	Fukunaga 56'; Bein 58'	J. League		Attendance: 49,094; Referee: Keiichi Sunakawa; Assistant referees: Hiroshi Fukuda, Ichirō Inukai; Fourth official: Noritake Sakurada

30 March 1996 4	Júbilo Iwata	1–1 (V-goal) (a.e.t.) (3–4 p)	Urawa Red Diamonds	Júbilo Iwata Stadium
14:02 JST (UTC+09)	Dunga 11'	J. League	Bein 27'	Attendance: 12,730; Referee: Yasuhiro Matsuzaki; Assistant referees: Naoyuki Mori, Masatoshi Shibata; Fourth official: Takuya Okada
	Penalties
	(penalty scored) Vanenburg; (penalty missed) Dunga; (penalty scored) Fujita; (penalty missed) Kudō; (penalty scored) Schillaci		(penalty scored) Hirose; (penalty scored) Taguchi; (penalty scored) Hori; (penalty missed) Yamada; (penalty scored) N. Ikeda

3 April 1996 5	Urawa Red Diamonds	4–1	Gamba Osaka	Urawa Komaba Stadium
19:04 JST (UTC+09)	Fukunaga 57'; Bein 65'; Buchwald 73'; Tsuchihashi 76'	J. League	Gillhaus 16'	Attendance: 20,614; Referee: Fumikazu Shioyazono; Assistant referees: Mitsuru Satō, Masaaki Shimomura; Fourth official: Ichirō Kuwabara

6 April 1996 6	Urawa Red Diamonds	0–2	Nagoya Grampus Eight	Urawa Komaba Stadium
14:02 JST (UTC+09)		J. League	Asano 61'; Moriyama 89'	Attendance: 19,608; Referee: Yoshimi Ogawa; Assistant referees: Akihisa Makino, Hitoshi Nakagomi; Fourth official: Akio Hayashi

13 April 1996 7	Verdy Kawasaki	2–0	Urawa Red Diamonds	Tokyo National Stadium
15:03 JST (UTC+09)	Hayashi 70'; K. Miura 83' (pen.)	J. League		Attendance: 45,555; Referee: Naotsugu Fuse; Assistant referees: Takashi Kunori, Susumu Takeda; Fourth official: Noritake Sakurada

17 April 1996 8	Urawa Red Diamonds	1–0	JEF United Ichihara	Urawa Komaba Stadium
19:03 JST (UTC+09)	Hirose 4' (pen.)	J. League		Attendance: 19,366; Referee: Keiichi Sunakawa; Assistant referees: Kenichi Koshiyama, Takayoshi Kashino; Fourth official: Izumi Okada

20 April 1996 9	Kashima Antlers	1–0	Urawa Red Diamonds	Akita Yabase Stadium
15:04 JST (UTC+09)	Kumagai 77'	J. League		Attendance: 10,643; Referee: Fumikazu Shioyazono; Assistant referees: Kazuaki Hamaguchi, Satoru Ishizawa; Fourth official: Masaki Asano

27 April 1996 10	Yokohama Flügels	1–4	Urawa Red Diamonds	Yokohama Mitsuzawa Football Stadium
19:33 JST (UTC+09)	Yamaguchi 74'	J. League	Hirose 7'; Boli 24'; Iwase 57'; Okano 77'	Attendance: 14,692; Referee: Archundia; Assistant referees: Akihisa Makino, Keiji Kamiara; Fourth official: Takao Oura

1 May 1996 11	Urawa Red Diamonds	0–0 (V-goal) (a.e.t.) (4–5 p)	Cerezo Osaka	Urawa Komaba Stadium
19:05 JST (UTC+09)		J. League		Attendance: 17,789; Referee: Hideo Kikuchi; Assistant referees: Yū Nakamura, Kō Ōishi; Fourth official: Shigeru Kimura
	Penalties
	(penalty scored) Hirose; (penalty scored) Taguchi; (penalty missed) Yamada; (penalty scored) N. Ikeda; (penalty scored) Okano; (penalty missed) Fukunaga		(penalty scored) Manoel; (penalty scored) Minamoto; (penalty scored) Kanda; (penalty missed) Morishima; (penalty scored) Fukagawa; (penalty scored) Kurata

4 May 1996 12	Urawa Red Diamonds	2–1 (V-goal) (a.e.t.)	Shimizu S-Pulse	Urawa Komaba Stadium
18:34 JST (UTC+09)	Iwase 44'; Fukuda 98'	J. League	Massaro 79'	Attendance: 19,213; Referee: Yoshitsugu Katayama; Assistant referees: Toshiyuki Mayuzumi, Tetsu Karakida; Fourth official: Akio Hayashi

11 May 1996 13	Sanfrecce Hiroshima	1–3	Urawa Red Diamonds	Hiroshima Big Arch
15:02 JST (UTC+09)	Uemura 44'	J. League	Hori 39', 48'; Fukuda 71'	Attendance: 9,681; Referee: Zoran Petrović; Assistant referees: Naoki Esumi, Kazuhiko Matsumura; Fourth official: Hitoshi Yamada

15 May 1996 14	Urawa Red Diamonds	1–0 (V-goal) (a.e.t.)	Kyoto Purple Sanga	Tokyo National Stadium
19:18 JST (UTC+09)	Taguchi 109'	J. League		Attendance: 50,974; Referee: Piotr Werner; Assistant referees: Toshimitsu Yoshida, Takao Onshi; Fourth official: Fusaya Suzuki

18 May 1996 15	Bellmare Hiratsuka	5–3	Urawa Red Diamonds	Niigata Stadium
18:01 JST (UTC+09)	T. Iwamoto 41', 76'; Narahashi 64'; Simão 79'; Noguchi 83'	J. League	Okano 10', 39'; Fukuda 30'	Attendance: 12,337; Referee: Yasuhiro Hemmi; Assistant referees: Kōji Taniuchi, Masaaki Shimomura; Fourth official: Naoki Nakamura

28 August 1996 16	Shimizu S-Pulse	2–3	Urawa Red Diamonds	Nihondaira Sports Stadium
19:04 JST (UTC+09)	Ōenoki 28'; 61' (o.g.)	J. League	Ōshiba 43'; Yamada 75'; Okano 76'	Attendance: 10,151; Referee: Yasuhiro Hemmi; Assistant referees: Yoshikazu Hiroshima, Takashi Aoki; Fourth official: Naoki Uchiyama

31 August 1996 17	Urawa Red Diamonds	5–1	Sanfrecce Hiroshima	Urawa Komaba Stadium
19:04 JST (UTC+09)	Hori 28'; Bein 30'; Yamada 36', 38'; Okano 44'	J. League	Takagi 81'	Attendance: 20,028; Referee: Hideo Kikuchi; Assistant referees: Takashi Kunori, Keiji Kamiara; Fourth official: Shigeru Kimura

7 September 1996 18	Kyoto Purple Sanga	1–0	Urawa Red Diamonds	Kyoto Nishikyogoku Stadium
18:34 JST (UTC+09)	Alexandre 13'	J. League		Attendance: 10,088; Referee: Bemard Saules; Assistant referees: Kōji Taniuchi, Takayoshi Kashino; Fourth official: Hiroyuki Ishida

14 September 1996 19	Urawa Red Diamonds	3–2	Bellmare Hiratsuka	Urawa Komaba Stadium
18:34 JST (UTC+09)	Okano 35'; Ōshiba 63'; Hori 86'	J. League	Seki 44'; Almir 59'	Attendance: 17,825; Referee: Lim Kee Chong; Assistant referees: Morihisa Yamaguchi, Ichirō Inukai; Fourth official: Shigeru Kimura

21 September 1996 20	Kashiwa Reysol	0–7	Urawa Red Diamonds	Tokyo National Stadium
15:04 JST (UTC+09)		J. League	Ōshiba 2'; Okano 21'; Boli 44'; Fukunaga 47', 65'; Buchwald 84' (pen.); Iwase 87'	Attendance: 35,926; Referee: Leslie Mottram; Assistant referees: Hiroshi Fukuda, Hisaharu Kitamura; Fourth official: Hide Lii

28 September 1996 21	Urawa Red Diamonds	1–1 (V-goal) (a.e.t.) (3–2 p)	Avispa Fukuoka	Sapporo Atsubetsu Stadium
13:03 JST (UTC+09)	Okano 1'	J. League	Mayor 3'	Attendance: 5,611; Referee: Zoran Petrović; Assistant referees: Mitsuru Satō, Keiji Kamiara; Fourth official: Eiji Kaneda
	Penalties
	(penalty scored) Hirose; (penalty scored) Buchwald; (penalty scored) Taguchi; (penalty missed) Okano		(penalty scored) Mayor; (penalty missed) Mori; (penalty scored) Iwai; (penalty missed) Umeyama; (penalty missed) Báez

2 October 1996 22	Yokohama Marinos	0–1	Urawa Red Diamonds	Yokohama Mitsuzawa Football Stadium
19:04 JST (UTC+09)		J. League	Buchwald 8' (pen.)	Attendance: 11,798; Referee: Bemard Saules; Assistant referees: Noboru Ishiyama, Akihisa Makino; Fourth official: Hiroshi Yashiro

5 October 1996 23	Urawa Red Diamonds	0–2	Júbilo Iwata	Urawa Komaba Stadium
15:03 JST (UTC+09)		J. League	Nakayama 22'; Nanami 82'	Attendance: 20,044; Referee: Leslie Mottram; Assistant referees: Kazuaki Hamaguchi, Hisaharu Kitamura; Fourth official: Toshimitsu Yasumoto

16 October 1996 24	Gamba Osaka	1–0 (V-goal) (a.e.t.)	Urawa Red Diamonds	Expo '70 Commemorative Stadium
19:00 JST (UTC+09)	Gillhaus 93'	J. League		Attendance: 5,254; Referee: Shinichirō Obata; Assistant referees: Hideaki Harada, Satoru Ishizawa; Fourth official: Tamotsu Ōnishi

19 October 1996 25	Nagoya Grampus Eight	0–1	Urawa Red Diamonds	Gifu Nagaragawa Stadium
15:00 JST (UTC+09)		J. League	27' (o.g.)	Attendance: 22,267; Referee: Zoran Petrović; Assistant referees: Yasushi Tsuchimoto, Hiroyuki Ōnishi; Fourth official: Katsuyasu Masui

26 October 1996 26	Urawa Red Diamonds	1–0	Verdy Kawasaki	Urawa Komaba Stadium
15:01 JST (UTC+09)	Okano 85'	J. League		Attendance: 19,495; Referee: Tōru Kamikawa; Assistant referees: Kazuya Yanagisawa, Hitoshi Nakagomi; Fourth official: Shigeru Kimura

30 October 1996 27	JEF United Ichihara	1–0	Urawa Red Diamonds	Ichihara Stadium
19:04 JST (UTC+09)	Rufer 38'	J. League		Attendance: 8,337; Referee: Hideo Kikuchi; Assistant referees: Yū Nakamura, Tetsu Karakida; Fourth official: Fujirō Masukura

2 November 1996 28	Urawa Red Diamonds	0–0 (V-goal) (a.e.t.) (4–5 p)	Kashima Antlers	Tokyo National Stadium
15:02 JST (UTC+09)		J. League		Attendance: 45,794; Referee: Bemard Saules; Assistant referees: Kazuhisa Osada, Hisaharu Kitamura; Fourth official: Tsutomu Anazawa
	Penalties
	(penalty scored) Hirose; (penalty missed) Buchwald; (penalty scored) Taguchi; (penalty scored) N. Ikeda; (penalty scored) Takita; (penalty missed) Bein		(penalty scored) Mazinho; (penalty scored) Honda; (penalty scored) Jorginho; (penalty scored) Hasegawa; (penalty missed) Rodrigo; (penalty scored) Akita

6 November 1996 29	Cerezo Osaka	3–1	Urawa Red Diamonds	Osaka Nagai Stadium
19:04 JST (UTC+09)	Morishima 30', 71'; Manoel 49'	J. League	Okano 1'	Attendance: 7,493; Referee: Kenji Tanaka; Assistant referees: Kazuya Yanagisawa, Kōji Taniuchi; Fourth official: Tamotsu Ōnishi

9 November 1996 30	Urawa Red Diamonds	3–0	Yokohama Flügels	Urawa Komaba Stadium
14:33 JST (UTC+09)	Bein 24'; Okano 33'; Takita 79' (pen.)	J. League		Attendance: 19,357; Referee: Leslie Mottram; Assistant referees: Yoshikazu Hiroshima, Keiji Kamiara; Fourth official: Izumi Okada

=== Emperor's Cup ===
1st Round	bye

2nd Round	bye

17 November 1996 3rd Round	Urawa Red Diamonds	3–0	NTT Kanto	Urawa Komaba Stadium
13:00 JST (UTC+09)	Okano 34', 50'; Iwase 62'			Attendance: 15,344; Referee: Keiichi Sunakawa

23 December 1996 4th Round	Urawa Red Diamonds	4–0	Cerezo Osaka	Tochigi Utsunomiya Green Stadium
13:00 JST (UTC+09)	Bein 39'; Taguchi 41'; Fukunaga 47'; Hori 62'			Attendance: 10,743; Referee: Fumikazu Shioyazono

26 December 1996 Quarterfinals	Urawa Red Diamonds	3–0	Bellmare Hiratsuka	Nagoya Mizuho Athletics Stadium
19:01 JST (UTC+09)	Hori 28'; Bein 66'; Yamada 76'			Attendance: 2,774; Referee: Shinichirō Obata

29 December 1996 Semifinals	Urawa Red Diamonds	0–3	Verdy Kawasaki	Tokyo National Stadium
13:05 JST (UTC+09)			Bismarck 57'; Y. Miura 70'; Kurihara 83'	Attendance: 28,994; Referee: Zoran Petrović

=== J.League Cup ===
1 June 1996 GL-A-1-1	Urawa Red Diamonds	1–3	Kashiwa Reysol	Urawa Komaba Stadium
18:33 JST (UTC+09)	Fukunaga 89'	J. League	Watanabe 32'; 60' (o.g.); Edílson 68'	Attendance: 20,230; Referee: Tatsumi Ōno; Assistant referees: Toshiyuki Mayuzumi, Keiji Kamiara; Fourth official: Akio Hayashi

5 June 1996 GL-A-1-2	Kashiwa Reysol	2–0 (5–1 agg.)	Urawa Red Diamonds	Hitachi Kashiwa Soccer Stadium
19:00 JST (UTC+09)	N. Katō 42'; Edílson 63'	J. League		Attendance: 9,348; Referee: Zoran Petrović; Assistant referees: Yū Nakamura, Masaaki Shimomura; Fourth official: Fujirō Masukura

8 June 1996 GL-A-2-1	Urawa Red Diamonds	0–0	Bellmare Hiratsuka	Urawa Komaba Stadium
18:33 JST (UTC+09)		J. League		Attendance: 19,287; Referee: Hiroyuki Umemoto; Assistant referees: Naoki Esumi, Susumu Takeda; Fourth official: Izumi Okada

12 June 1996 GL-A-2-2	Bellmare Hiratsuka	1–2 (1–2 agg.)	Urawa Red Diamonds	Hiratsuka Stadium
19:01 JST (UTC+09)	Betinho 36'	J. League	Boli 50'; Fukuda 78' (pen.)	Attendance: 7,893; Referee: Keiichi Sunakawa; Assistant referees: Noboru Ishiyama, Kenichi Koshiyama; Fourth official: Takatoshi Itō

15 June 1996 GL-A-3-1	Kyoto Purple Sanga	1–1	Urawa Red Diamonds	Kyoto Nishikyogoku Stadium
18:34 JST (UTC+09)	Raudnei 53'	J. League	Boli 31'	Attendance: 14,992; Referee: Yoshitsugu Katayama; Assistant referees: Mitsuru Satō, Takashi Aoki; Fourth official: Yoshihisa Takahashi

19 June 1996 GL-A-3-2	Urawa Red Diamonds	0–1 (1–2 agg.)	Kyoto Purple Sanga	Urawa Komaba Stadium
19:03 JST (UTC+09)		J. League	To. Yamaguchi 37'	Attendance: 18,742; Referee: Tetsuya Hamana; Assistant referees: Yoshikazu Hiroshima, Keiji Kamiara; Fourth official: Toshimitsu Yasumoto

22 June 1996 GL-A-4-1	Yokohama Marinos	2–0	Urawa Red Diamonds	Yokohama Mitsuzawa Football Stadium
15:01 JST (UTC+09)	Matsuda 14'; Zapata 16'	J. League		Attendance: 13,476; Referee: Archundia; Assistant referees: Yū Nakamura, Takao Onshi; Fourth official: Kenji Ōgiya

26 June 1996 GL-A-4-2	Urawa Red Diamonds	2–1 (2–3 agg.)	Yokohama Marinos	Urawa Komaba Stadium
19:00 JST (UTC+09)	Okano 78'; Fukuda 89'	J. League	Bisconti 89'	Attendance: 18,914; Referee: Naotsugu Fuse; Assistant referees: Takashi Kunori, Hitoshi Nakagomi; Fourth official: Ichirō Kuwabara

29 June 1996 GL-A-5-1	Urawa Red Diamonds	1–2	Júbilo Iwata	Urawa Komaba Stadium
18:33 JST (UTC+09)	Fukuda 3' (pen.)	J. League	Nakayama 62'; Schillaci 89'	Attendance: 20,324; Referee: Tetsuya Hamana; Assistant referees: Akihisa Makino, Susumu Takeda; Fourth official: Shigeru Kimura

3 July 1996 GL-A-5-2	Júbilo Iwata	2–2 (4–3 agg.)	Urawa Red Diamonds	Júbilo Iwata Stadium
19:01 JST (UTC+09)	Nakayama 66'; Vanenburg 73' (pen.)	J. League	Fukuda 53'; Boli 86'	Attendance: 11,832; Referee: Kazuo Kakihana; Assistant referees: Kimio Izaki, Takuji Fukazawa; Fourth official: Tōru Nagata

10 August 1996 GL-A-6-1	Sanfrecce Hiroshima	2–3	Urawa Red Diamonds	Hiroshima Big Arch
18:32 JST (UTC+09)	Santos 5', 39'	J. League	Bein 17'; Fukunaga 52'; 59' (o.g.)	Attendance: 9,271; Referee: Shinichirō Obata; Assistant referees: Tōru Yamashiro, Hiroyuki Ōnishi; Fourth official: Katsuya Motoyasu

14 August 1996 GL-A-6-2	Urawa Red Diamonds	0–2 (3–4 agg.)	Sanfrecce Hiroshima	Urawa Komaba Stadium
19:00 JST (UTC+09)		J. League	Santos 25', 77'	Attendance: 19,386; Referee: Hiroshi Tanabe; Assistant referees: Yū Nakamura, Kōji Minami; Fourth official: Toshimitsu Yasumoto

17 August 1996 GL-A-7-1	Gamba Osaka	1–1	Urawa Red Diamonds	Expo '70 Commemorative Stadium
19:00 JST (UTC+09)	Matsuyama 89'	J. League	Ōshiba 58'	Attendance: 8,010; Referee: Tōru Kamikawa; Assistant referees: Morihisa Yamaguchi, Akio Okutani; Fourth official: Sōichirō Kaneko

21 August 1996 GL-A-7-2	Urawa Red Diamonds	3–0 (4–1 agg.)	Gamba Osaka	Urawa Komaba Stadium
19:03 JST (UTC+09)	Taguchi 7'; Ōshiba 19'; Okano 34'	J. League		Attendance: 18,483; Referee: Bemard Saules; Assistant referees: Masahiro Katagiri, Takayoshi Kashino; Fourth official: Izumi Okada

== Player statistics ==
No.	Pos	Nat	Player	Total		J.League		Emperor's Cup		J.League Cup	
No.	Pos	Nat	Player	Apps	Goals	Apps	Goals	Apps	Goals	Apps	Goals
	GK	(Japan) JPN	Hisashi Tsuchida	0	0	0	0	0	0	0	0
	GK	(Japan) JPN	Yūki Takita	48	1	30	1	4	0	14	0
	GK	(Japan) JPN	Hiroki Aratani	0	0	0	0	0	0	0	0
	GK	(Japan) JPN	Kōji Honma	0	0	0	0	0	0	0	0
	DF	(Germany) GER	Guido Buchwald	40	3	24	3	4	0	12	0
	DF	(Japan) JPN	Yoshinori Taguchi	41	3	24	1	4	1	13	1
	DF	(France) FRA	Basile Boli	32	5	22	2	0	0	10	3
	DF	(Japan) JPN	Masahiro Ōta	0	0	0	0	0	0	0	0
	DF	(Japan) JPN	Futoshi Ikeda	0	0	0	0	0	0	0	0
	DF	(Japan) JPN	Tsutomu Nishino	3	0	0	0	0	0	3	0
	DF	(Japan) JPN	Yoshio Takahashi	0	0	0	0	0	0	0	0
	DF	(Japan) JPN	Mitsuhiro Iga	0	0	0	0	0	0	0	0
	DF	(Japan) JPN	Shinji Jōjō	7	0	2	0	0	0	5	0
	MF	(Germany) GER	Uwe Bein	31	8	20	5	4	2	7	1
	MF	(Japan) JPN	Osamu Hirose	37	4	24	4	4	0	9	0
	MF	(Japan) JPN	Takafumi Hori	40	6	26	4	4	2	10	0
	MF	(Japan) JPN	Nobuyasu Ikeda	22	0	17	0	0	0	5	0
	MF	(Japan) JPN	Kōichi Sugiyama	35	0	23	0	3	0	9	0
	MF	(Japan) JPN	Masaki Tsuchihashi	39	1	22	1	4	0	13	0
	MF	(Japan) JPN	Yasushi Fukunaga	45	9	28	6	4	1	13	2
	MF	(Japan) JPN	Nobutake Mochiyama	0	0	0	0	0	0	0	0
	MF	(Japan) JPN	Hideki Uchidate	8	0	5	0	3	0	0	0
	MF	(Japan) JPN	Ken Iwase	33	4	21	3	1	1	11	0
	MF	(Japan) JPN	Naoto Sakurai	6	0	4	0	2	0	0	0
	MF	(Japan) JPN	Nobuhisa Yamada	45	4	30	3	4	1	11	0
	MF	(Japan) JPN	Takeshi Nakashima	7	0	3	0	0	0	4	0
	MF	(Japan) JPN	Masao Kamino	0	0	0	0	0	0	0	0
	MF	(Japan) JPN	Eiji Hanayama	0	0	0	0	0	0	0	0
	MF	(Japan) JPN	Toshiya Ishii	0	0	0	0	0	0	0	0
	FW	(Japan) JPN	Masahiro Fukuda	11	7	4	3	0	0	7	4
	FW	(Japan) JPN	Masayuki Okano	46	15	30	11	3	2	13	2
	FW	(Japan) JPN	Kenji Ōshiba	20	5	17	3	0	0	3	2
	FW	(Japan) JPN	Taichi Satō	0	0	0	0	0	0	0	0
	FW	(Japan) JPN	Shingo Suzuki	0	0	0	0	0	0	0	0
	FW	(Denmark) DEN	Brian Steen Nielsen †	14	0	6	0	4	0	4	0

- † player(s) joined the team after the opening of this season.

== Transfers ==
In:

No.	Pos.	Nation	Player
—	GK	JPN	Kōji Honma (from Mito Junior College High School)
—	DF	FRA	Basile Boli (from AS Monaco)
—	DF	JPN	Yoshio Takahashi (from Bunan Senior High School)
—	DF	JPN	Mitsuhiro Iga (from Urawa Red Diamonds youth)
—	DF	JPN	Shinji Jōjō (from Funabashi municipal High School)
—	MF	JPN	Nobutake Mochiyama (from Hannan University)
—	MF	JPN	Hideki Uchidate (from Sendai College)
—	MF	JPN	Masao Kamino (from Urawa Red Diamonds youth)
—	MF	JPN	Eiji Hanayama (from Utsunomiya Gakuen High School)
—	MF	JPN	Toshiya Ishii (from Shizuoka Gakuen Senior High School)
—	FW	JPN	Kenji Ōshiba (from Kokushikan University)
—	FW	JPN	Taichi Satō (from Hanasaki Tokuharu High School)
—	FW	JPN	Shingo Suzuki (from Urawa Red Diamonds youth)

Out:

No.	Pos.	Nation	Player
—	GK	JPN	Norio Takahashi (to Brummel Sendai)
—	DF	JPN	Masanaga Kageyama (to Brummel Sendai)
—	DF	KOR	Cho Kwi-Jea (to Vissel Kobe)
—	DF	JPN	Yukinori Muramatsu (to Fujitsu)
—	DF	JPN	Yūta Nakazawa (retired)
—	DF	JPN	Naohiko Noro (to Mind House F.C.)
—	MF	GER	Michael Rummenigge
—	MF	JPN	Shirō Kikuhara (loan return to Verdy Kawasaki)
—	MF	JPN	Edwin Uehara (to Tosu Futures)
—	MF	JPN	Nobuyuki Hosaka (to Fujitsu)
—	MF	JPN	Hideto Saitō (to Fukaya Club)
—	FW	JPN	Shinichi Kawano (to Vissel Kobe)
—	FW	JPN	Takeshi Mizuuchi (to Brummel Sendai)
—	FW	JPN	Yūichi Sonoda (retired)
—	FW	BRA	Toninho (loan return to Shimizu S-Pulse)

== Transfers during the season ==
=== In ===
- (Denmark) Brian Steen Nielsen (loan from OB Odense on August)

== Awards ==
- J.League Best XI: (Germany) Guido Buchwald, (Japan) Masayuki Okano

== Other pages ==
- (in Japanese) J. League official site
- (in Japanese) Urawa Red Diamonds official site
