= 2001 Urawa Red Diamonds season =

Urawa Red Diamonds
2001 season
- Manager: Tita; Pita
- Stadium: Urawa Komaba Stadium
- J.League 1: 10th
- Emperor's Cup: Semifinals
- J.League Cup: Quarterfinals
- Top goalscorer: Tuto (8)
Home colours	Away colours

2001 Urawa Red Diamonds season

== Competitions ==
Competitions	Position
J.League 1	10th / 16 clubs
Emperor's Cup	Semifinals
J.League Cup	Quarterfinals

== Domestic results ==
=== J.League 1 ===
10 March 2001 1-1	Nagoya Grampus Eight	2-0	Urawa Red Diamonds	Mizuho Rugby Stadium
JST (UTC+09)

17 March 2001 1-2	Urawa Red Diamonds	2-2 (GG) (a.e.t.)	Cerezo Osaka	Urawa Komaba Stadium
JST (UTC+09)

31 March 2001 1-3	Urawa Red Diamonds	2-0	Avispa Fukuoka	Urawa Komaba Stadium
JST (UTC+09)

7 April 2001 1-4	Yokohama F. Marinos	0-1	Urawa Red Diamonds	International Stadium Yokohama
JST (UTC+09)

14 April 2001 1-5	Urawa Red Diamonds	1-3	FC Tokyo	Urawa Komaba Stadium
JST (UTC+09)

29 April 2001 1-6	Kashima Antlers	2-1	Urawa Red Diamonds	Tokyo National Stadium
JST (UTC+09)

3 May 2001 1-7	Urawa Red Diamonds	0-2	Júbilo Iwata	Tokyo National Stadium
JST (UTC+09)

6 May 2001 1-8	Urawa Red Diamonds	4-2	Tokyo Verdy 1969	Urawa Komaba Stadium
JST (UTC+09)

12 May 2001 1-9	Vissel Kobe	1-2 (GG) (a.e.t.)	Urawa Red Diamonds	Kobe Universiade Memorial Stadium
JST (UTC+09)

19 May 2001 1-10	Urawa Red Diamonds	1-2	Gamba Osaka	Urawa Komaba Stadium
JST (UTC+09)

16 June 2001 1-11	Shimizu S-Pulse	1-0 (GG) (a.e.t.)	Urawa Red Diamonds	Nihondaira Sports Stadium
JST (UTC+09)

23 June 2001 1-12	Urawa Red Diamonds	2-0	Consadole Sapporo	Urawa Komaba Stadium
JST (UTC+09)

7 July 2001 1-13	Kashiwa Reysol	3-2	Urawa Red Diamonds	Tokyo National Stadium
JST (UTC+09)

14 July 2001 1-14	Urawa Red Diamonds	3-1	JEF United Ichihara	Urawa Komaba Stadium
JST (UTC+09)

21 July 2001 1-15	Sanfrecce Hiroshima	1-3	Urawa Red Diamonds	Hiroshima Big Arch
JST (UTC+09)

11 August 2001 2-1	Urawa Red Diamonds	1-3	Vissel Kobe	Urawa Komaba Stadium
JST (UTC+09)

18 August 2001 2-2	Tokyo Verdy 1969	2-1	Urawa Red Diamonds	Tokyo Stadium
JST (UTC+09)

25 August 2001 2-3	Urawa Red Diamonds	2-1	Sanfrecce Hiroshima	Urawa Komaba Stadium
JST (UTC+09)

8 September 2001 2-4	JEF United Ichihara	2-1	Urawa Red Diamonds	Tokyo National Stadium
JST (UTC+09)

15 September 2001 2-5	Júbilo Iwata	2-1 (GG) (a.e.t.)	Urawa Red Diamonds	Júbilo Iwata Stadium
JST (UTC+09)

22 September 2001 2-6	Urawa Red Diamonds	1-2 (GG) (a.e.t.)	Kashima Antlers	Tokyo National Stadium
JST (UTC+09)

29 September 2001 2-7	FC Tokyo	3-2	Urawa Red Diamonds	Tokyo Stadium
JST (UTC+09)

13 October 2001 2-8	Urawa Red Diamonds	0-2	Yokohama F. Marinos	Saitama Stadium 2002
JST (UTC+09)

17 October 2001 2-9	Avispa Fukuoka	1-1 (GG) (a.e.t.)	Urawa Red Diamonds	Hakatanomori Football Stadium
JST (UTC+09)

20 October 2001 2-10	Gamba Osaka	1-1 (GG) (a.e.t.)	Urawa Red Diamonds	Osaka Expo '70 Stadium
JST (UTC+09)

31 October 2001 2-11	Urawa Red Diamonds	2-1	Shimizu S-Pulse	Urawa Komaba Stadium
JST (UTC+09)

3 November 2001 2-12	Consadole Sapporo	1-1 (GG) (a.e.t.)	Urawa Red Diamonds	Sapporo Dome
JST (UTC+09)

10 November 2001 2-13	Urawa Red Diamonds	3-1	Kashiwa Reysol	Saitama Stadium 2002
JST (UTC+09)

17 November 2001 2-14	Cerezo Osaka	2-1 (GG) (a.e.t.)	Urawa Red Diamonds	Osaka Nagai Stadium
JST (UTC+09)

24 November 2001 2-15	Urawa Red Diamonds	2-0	Nagoya Grampus Eight	Urawa Komaba Stadium
JST (UTC+09)

=== Emperor's Cup ===
1st Round	bye

2nd Round	bye

9 December 2001 3rd Round	Urawa Red Diamonds	2-0	Ventforet Kofu	Omiya Football Stadium
JST (UTC+09)

16 December 2001 4th Round	Urawa Red Diamonds	4-1	Vissel Kobe	Nishikyogoku Athletic Stadium
JST (UTC+09)

24 December 2001 Quarterfinals	Urawa Red Diamonds	2-1	JEF United Ichihara	Sendai Stadium
JST (UTC+09)

29 December 2001 Semifinals	Cerezo Osaka	1-0	Urawa Red Diamonds	Saitama Stadium 2002
JST (UTC+09)

=== J.League Cup ===
4 April 2001 1st Round-1	Montedio Yamagata	2-0	Urawa Red Diamonds	Yamagata Park Stadium
JST (UTC+09)

18 April 2001 1st Round-2	Urawa Red Diamonds	3-0 (3-2 agg.)	Montedio Yamagata	Urawa Komaba Stadium
JST (UTC+09)

13 June 2001 2nd Round-1	Gamba Osaka	1-3	Urawa Red Diamonds	Osaka Expo '70 Stadium
JST (UTC+09)

20 June 2001 2nd Round-2	Urawa Red Diamonds	3-2 (6-3 agg.)	Gamba Osaka	Urawa Komaba Stadium
JST (UTC+09)

8 August 2001 Quarterfinals-1	Urawa Red Diamonds	1-0	Kashima Antlers	Urawa Komaba Stadium
JST (UTC+09)

29 August 2001 Quarterfinals-2	Kashima Antlers	2-0 (GG) (a.e.t.) (2-1 agg.)	Urawa Red Diamonds	Kashima Soccer Stadium
JST (UTC+09)

== Player statistics ==
No.	Pos.	Nat.	Player	D.o.B. (Age)	Height / Weight	J.League 1		Emperor's Cup		J.League Cup		Total	
No.	Pos.	Nat.	Player	D.o.B. (Age)	Height / Weight	Apps	Goals	Apps	Goals	Apps	Goals	Apps	Goals
1	GK	(Japan)	Tomoyasu Ando	May 23, 1974 (aged 26)	cm / kg	9	0						
2	DF	(Japan)	Nobuhisa Yamada	September 10, 1975 (aged 25)	cm / kg	27	3						
3	DF	(Japan)	Masami Ihara	September 18, 1967 (aged 33)	cm / kg	26	1						
4	MF	(Japan)	Masaki Tsuchihashi	July 23, 1972 (aged 28)	cm / kg	22	0						
5	MF	(Brazil)	Donizete Oliveira	February 21, 1968 (aged 33)	cm / kg	7	0						
6	MF	(Japan)	Toshiya Ishii	January 19, 1978 (aged 23)	cm / kg	30	0						
7	FW	(Japan)	Masayuki Okano	July 25, 1972 (aged 28)	cm / kg	8	0						
8	MF	(Japan)	Shinji Ono	September 27, 1979 (aged 21)	cm / kg	14	2						
9	FW	(Japan)	Masahiro Fukuda	December 17, 1966 (aged 34)	cm / kg	14	2						
10	MF	(Brazil)	Adriano	September 20, 1974 (aged 26)	cm / kg	22	6						
11	FW	(Brazil)	Tuto	July 2, 1978 (aged 22)	cm / kg	24	8						
12	DF	(Japan)	Tsutomu Nishino	March 13, 1971 (aged 29)	cm / kg	11	0						
13	MF	(Japan)	Keita Suzuki	July 8, 1981 (aged 19)	cm / kg	15	1						
14	MF	(Japan)	Yasushi Fukunaga	March 6, 1973 (aged 28)	cm / kg	9	0						
15	MF	(Japan)	Tomoyuki Yoshino	July 9, 1980 (aged 20)	cm / kg	1	0						
16	GK	(Japan)	Yohei Nishibe	December 1, 1980 (aged 20)	cm / kg	21	0						
17	MF	(Japan)	Ryuji Kawai	July 14, 1978 (aged 22)	cm / kg	1	0						
18	FW	(Japan)	Yuichiro Nagai	February 14, 1979 (aged 22)	cm / kg	25	6						
19	DF	(Japan)	Hideki Uchidate	January 15, 1974 (aged 27)	cm / kg	18	0						
20	MF	(Japan)	Toshiyuki Abe	August 1, 1974 (aged 26)	cm / kg	23	3						
21	DF	(Japan)	Ichiei Muroi	June 22, 1974 (aged 26)	cm / kg	2	0						
22	DF	(Japan)	Shinji Jojo	August 28, 1977 (aged 23)	cm / kg	12	0						
23	MF	(Japan)	Toru Chishima	May 11, 1981 (aged 19)	cm / kg	0	0						
24	DF	(Japan)	Tomonobu Hayakawa	July 11, 1977 (aged 23)	cm / kg	1	0						
25	DF	(Japan)	Shunji Iwamoto	December 29, 1981 (aged 19)	cm / kg	0	0						
26	MF	(Japan)	Takamasa Watanabe	May 12, 1977 (aged 23)	cm / kg	1	0						
27	DF	(Japan)	Manabu Ikeda	July 3, 1980 (aged 20)	cm / kg	13	0						
28	MF	(Japan)	Katsuyuki Miyazawa	September 15, 1976 (aged 24)	cm / kg	0	0						
29	DF	(Japan)	Akihiro Tabata	May 15, 1978 (aged 22)	cm / kg	0	0						
30	DF	(Japan)	Takuro Nishimura	August 15, 1977 (aged 23)	cm / kg	0	0						
31	FW	(Japan)	Tatsuya Tanaka	November 27, 1982 (aged 18)	cm / kg	19	3						
32	GK	(Japan)	Norihiro Yamagishi	May 17, 1978 (aged 22)	cm / kg	0	0						
33	DF	(Japan)	Ryuji Michiki	August 25, 1973 (aged 27)	cm / kg	16	0						
35	DF	(Japan)	Shinya Kawashima	July 20, 1978 (aged 22)	cm / kg	0	0						
36	FW	(Brazil)	Emerson	September 6, 1981 (aged 19)	cm / kg	13	7						
37	MF	(Brazil)	Harison	January 2, 1980 (aged 21)	cm / kg	6	2						
