= Takafumi Hori =

Japanese footballer and manager

Takafumi Hori 堀 孝史
Personal information
- Full name: Takafumi Hori
- Date of birth: September 10, 1967 (age 59)
- Place of birth: Atsugi, Kanagawa, Japan
- Height: 1.77 m (5 ft 10 in)
- Position: Midfielder

Youth career
- 1983–1985: Kamakura High School
- 1986–1989: Meiji University

Senior career*
Years	Team	Apps	(Gls)
1990–1992	Toshiba	41	(9)
1992–1998	Urawa Reds	158	(11)
1999–2001	Shonan Bellmare	95	(7)
Total		294	(27)

Managerial career
- 2011: Urawa Reds
- 2017–2018: Urawa Reds
- 2021–2022: Tokyo Verdy
- 2023: Vegalta Sendai
- * Club domestic league appearances and goals

Takafumi Hori (堀 孝史, Hori Takafumi; born September 10, 1967) is a Japanese football manager and former footballer he is the currently assistant manager of J2 League club Yokohama FC. His brother Naoto Hori is also a footballer.

== Playing career ==
Hori was born in Atsugi on September 10, 1967. After graduating from Meiji University, he joined Toshiba in 1990. He became a regular player as offensive midfielder from first season. He moved to Urawa Reds in 1992. Although he played many matches as defensive midfielder, he was converted to defensive midfielder by new manager Holger Osieck in 1995. He lost opportunity to play in 1998 and he moved to Bellmare Hiratsuka (later Shonan Bellmare) in 1999. He played many matches and supported the club with many young players due to financial strain end of 1998 season. He retired end of 2001 season.

== Coaching career ==
After retirement, Hori started a coaching career at Shonan Bellmare in 2002. He moved to Urawa Reds in 2005. He mainly managed youth team. Top team performance was bad in 2011, and manager Željko Petrović was sacked and Hori named a new manager in October. He managed 5 matches and remained the club stayed J1 League. From 2012, he became a coach under new manager Mihailo Petrović. In July 2017, Petrović was sacked and Hori became a manager again. The club won the champions 2017 AFC Champions League for the first time in 10 years. He was also selected AFC Coach of the Year in 2017. However the club performance was bad in 2018 season, he was sacked in April.

== Career statistics ==
Appearances and goals by club, season and competition
Club	Season	League			Emperor's Cup		J.League Cup		Total	
Club	Season	Division	Apps	Goals	Apps	Goals	Apps	Goals	Apps	Goals
Toshiba	1990–91	JSL Division 1	22	7	3	1	2	0	27	8
Toshiba	1991–92	JSL Division 1	19	2	3	0	2	0	24	2
Urawa Reds	1992	J1 League	—		4	0	7	2	11	2
Urawa Reds	1993	J1 League	27	0	2	0	5	0	34	0
Urawa Reds	1994	J1 League	41	1	0	0	2	0	43	1
Urawa Reds	1995	J1 League	31	2	3	0	—		34	2
Urawa Reds	1996	J1 League	26	4	4	2	10	0	40	6
Urawa Reds	1997	J1 League	29	3	0	0	8	2	37	5
Urawa Reds	1998	J1 League	4	1	0	0	4	0	8	1
Bellmare Hiratsuka	1999	J1 League	30	3	1	0	2	0	33	3
Shonan Bellmare	2000	J2 League	32	3	3	0	0	0	35	3
Shonan Bellmare	2001	J2 League	33	1	1	0	2	0	36	1
Career total			294	27	24	3	44	4	362	34

== Managerial statistics ==
Team	From	To	Record				
Team	From	To	G	W	D	L	Win %
Urawa Reds	2011	2011	5	2	1	2	40.00
Urawa Reds	2017	2018	19	5	7	7	26.32
Total			24	7	8	9	29.17

== Honours ==
=== Manager ===
Urawa Red Diamonds

- AFC Champions League: 2017

=== Individual ===
- AFC Coach of the Year: 2017
