= Yoshinori Taguchi =

Japanese footballer and manager

Yoshinori Taguchi 田口 禎則
Personal information
- Full name: Yoshinori Taguchi
- Date of birth: September 14, 1965 (age 61)
- Place of birth: Saitama, Japan
- Height: 1.84 m (6 ft 1/2 in)
- Position: Defender

Youth career
- 1981–1983: Saitama Urawa Minami High School
- 1985–1988: University of Tsukuba

Senior career*
Years	Team	Apps	(Gls)
1989–1992	Yokohama Flügels	139	(8)
1993	Sanfrecce Hiroshima	6	(0)
1994–1998	Urawa Reds	90	(6)
Total		235	(14)

Managerial career
- 2001–2004: Saitama Reinas
- * Club domestic league appearances and goals

Yoshinori Taguchi (田口 禎則, Taguchi Yoshinori; born September 14, 1965) is a former Japanese football player and manager.

== Club career ==
Taguchi was born in Saitama on September 14, 1965. After graduating from University of Tsukuba, he joined All Nippon Airways (later Yokohama Flügels) in 1989. He became a regular player as center back from first season. However he was suspended for seven months from October 1991 due to violence against referee. In 1993, he moved to Sanfrecce Hiroshima. However he could not become regular player due to injury before opening season. In 1994, he moved to his local club Urawa Reds and became a regular player. However he was suspended for four months from September 1995 due to violence against supporter after a match. From 1997, he could hardly play in the match in two seasons for injury. Although he came back on October 3, 1998, he receiving a red card. This match became his last match. He retired end of 1998 season.

== National team career ==
In 1988, when Taguchi was a University of Tsukuba student, he was selected Japan national "B team" for 1988 Asian Cup. At this competition, he played 3 games. However, Japan Football Association don't count as Japan national team match because this Japan team was "B team" not "top team"

== Coaching career ==
After retirement, Taguchi became a manager for L.League club Urawa Reinas (later Saitama Reinas) in 2001. In 2004, the club won the champions L.League and the 2nd place Empress's Cup. He resigned end of 2004 season.

== Club statistics ==
Club performance			League		Cup		League Cup		Total	
Season	Club	League	Apps	Goals	Apps	Goals	Apps	Goals	Apps	Goals
Japan			League		Emperor's Cup		J.League Cup		Total	
1989/90	All Nippon Airways	JSL Division 1	20	1	4	0	3	0	27	1
1990/91	All Nippon Airways	JSL Division 1	18	1	2	1	4	0	24	1
1991/92	All Nippon Airways	JSL Division 1	5	0	0	0	1	0	6	0
1992	Yokohama Flügels	J1 League	-		1	0	0	0	1	0
1993	Sanfrecce Hiroshima	J1 League	6	0	0	0	0	0	6	0
1994	Urawa Reds	J1 League	29	1	2	0	2	0	33	1
1995	Urawa Reds	J1 League	36	4	0	0	-		36	4
1996	Urawa Reds	J1 League	24	1	4	1	13	1	41	3
1997	Urawa Reds	J1 League	0	0	0	0	0	0	0	0
1998	Urawa Reds	J1 League	1	0	0	0	0	0	1	0
Total			139	8	13	2	23	1	175	11
