= Manabu Ikeda =

Japanese footballer

Manabu Ikeda 池田 学
Personal information
- Full name: Manabu Ikeda
- Date of birth: July 3, 1980 (age 46)
- Place of birth: Ibaraki, Osaka, Japan
- Height: 1.83 m (6 ft 0 in)
- Position: Defender

Youth career
- 1996–1998: Shimizu Commercial High School

Senior career*
Years	Team	Apps	(Gls)
1999–2002	Urawa Reds	30	(2)
2003–2004	Shonan Bellmare	14	(0)
Total		44	(2)
Medal record
Urawa Reds
Runner-up	J.League Cup	2002
- * Club domestic league appearances and goals

Manabu Ikeda (池田 学, Ikeda Manabu; born July 3, 1980) is a former Japanese football player.

== Playing career ==
Ikeda was born in Ibaraki on July 3, 1980. After graduating from Shimizu Commercial High School, he joined the J1 League club Urawa Reds in 1999. He played many matches as center back during the first season. However the club was relegated to the J2 League in 2000. Although he did not play at all in 2000, the club was promoted to J1 in a year. In 2001, he played in many matches again. However he did not play at all in 2002. In 2003, he moved to the J2 club Shonan Bellmare. Although he was with the team for two seasons, he did not play much and retired at the end of the 2004 season.

== Career statistics ==
Appearances and goals by club, season and competition
Club	Season	League			Emperor's Cup		J.League Cup		Total	
Club	Season	Division	Apps	Goals	Apps	Goals	Apps	Goals	Apps	Goals
Urawa Reds	1999	J1 League	17	2	2	1	3	0	22	3
Urawa Reds	2000	J2 League	0	0	0	0	0	0	0	0
Urawa Reds	2001	J1 League	13	0	3	0	4	0	20	0
Urawa Reds	2002	J1 League	0	0	0	0	0	0	0	0
Shonan Bellmare	2003	J2 League	13	0			—		13	0
Shonan Bellmare	2004	J2 League	1	0			—		1	0
Career total			44	2	5	1	7	0	56	3
