= Taichi Sato =

Japanese footballer (born 1977)

Taichi Sato 佐藤 太一
Personal information
- Full name: Taichi Sato
- Date of birth: August 23, 1977 (age 49)
- Place of birth: Saitama, Japan
- Height: 1.83 m (6 ft 0 in)
- Position: Forward

Youth career
- 1993–1995: Hanasaki Tokuharu High School

Senior career*
Years	Team	Apps	(Gls)
1996–1998	Urawa Reds	6	(0)
1999–2000	Omiya Ardija	26	(3)
2001	Montedio Yamagata	9	(2)
2002	Clementi Khalsa	0	(0)
Total		41	(5)
- * Club domestic league appearances and goals

Taichi Sato (佐藤 太一, Satō Taichi; born August 23, 1977) is a former Japanese football player.

== Playing career ==
Sato was born in Saitama Prefecture on August 23, 1977. After graduating from high school, he joined his local club Urawa Reds in 1996. Although he debuted in 1997 season, he could hardly play in the match. In 1999, he moved to newly was promoted to J2 League club, Omiya Ardija. Although he played many matches in 1999, his opportunity to play decreased in 2000. In 2001, he moved to Montedio Yamagata. However he could not play many matches and retired end of 2001 season.

== Career statistics ==
Appearances and goals by club, season and competition
Club	Season	League			Emperor's Cup		J.League Cup		Total	
Club	Season	Division	Apps	Goals	Apps	Goals	Apps	Goals	Apps	Goals
Urawa Reds	1996	J1 League	0	0	0	0	0	0	0	0
Urawa Reds	1997	J1 League	6	0	0	0	0	0	6	0
Urawa Reds	1998	J1 League	0	0	0	0	0	0	0	0
Omiya Ardija	1999	J2 League	19	2			2	0	21	2
Omiya Ardija	2000	J2 League	7	1			0	0	7	1
Montedio Yamagata	2001	J2 League	9	2	0	0	0	0	9	2
Career total			41	5	0	0	2	0	43	5
