= 2000 Urawa Red Diamonds season =

Urawa Red Diamonds
2000 season
- Manager: Kazuo Saito; Kenzo Yokoyama
- Stadium: Urawa Komaba Stadium
- J.League 2: 2nd
- Emperor's Cup: 4th Round
- J.League Cup: 1st Round
- Top goalscorer: Yuichiro Nagai (12)
Home colours	Away colours

2000 Urawa Red Diamonds season

== Competitions ==
Competitions	Position
J.League 2	2nd / 11 clubs
Emperor's Cup	4th round
J.League Cup	1st round

== Domestic results ==
=== J.League 2 ===
11 March 2000 1	Urawa Red Diamonds	2-0	Mito HollyHock	Urawa Komaba Stadium
JST (UTC+09)

19 March 2000 2	Shonan Bellmare	1-2	Urawa Red Diamonds	Hiratsuka Athletics Stadium
JST (UTC+09)

25 March 2000 3	Urawa Red Diamonds	1-0	Omiya Ardija	Urawa Komaba Stadium
JST (UTC+09)

30 March 2000 4	Sagan Tosu	0-7	Urawa Red Diamonds	Tosu Stadium
JST (UTC+09)

2 April 2000 5	Urawa Red Diamonds	3-1	Ventforet Kofu	Urawa Komaba Stadium
JST (UTC+09)

16 July 2000 6	Consadole Sapporo	1-1 (GG) (a.e.t.)	Urawa Red Diamonds	Muroran Irie Stadium
JST (UTC+09)

16 April 2000 7	Urawa Red Diamonds	5-1	Albirex Niigata	Urawa Komaba Stadium
JST (UTC+09)

23 April 2000 8	Vegalta Sendai	2-3 (GG) (a.e.t.)	Urawa Red Diamonds	Sendai Stadium
JST (UTC+09)

9	bye

3 May 2000 10	Urawa Red Diamonds	2-1	Oita Trinita	Urawa Komaba Stadium
JST (UTC+09)

7 May 2000 11	Montedio Yamagata	1-0	Urawa Red Diamonds	Yamagata Park Stadium
JST (UTC+09)

14 May 2000 12	Mito HollyHock	1-2	Urawa Red Diamonds	Hitachi Athletic Stadium
JST (UTC+09)

18 May 2000 13	Urawa Red Diamonds	2-0	Shonan Bellmare	Urawa Komaba Stadium
JST (UTC+09)

22 May 2000 14	Omiya Ardija	0-6	Urawa Red Diamonds	Omiya Football Stadium
JST (UTC+09)

27 May 2000 15	Urawa Red Diamonds	3-1	Sagan Tosu	Urawa Komaba Stadium
JST (UTC+09)

1 June 2000 16	Ventforet Kofu	0-3	Urawa Red Diamonds	Kose Sports Park Stadium
JST (UTC+09)

4 June 2000 17	Urawa Red Diamonds	0-1	Consadole Sapporo	Urawa Komaba Stadium
JST (UTC+09)

10 June 2000 18	Albirex Niigata	6-1	Urawa Red Diamonds	Niigata City Athletic Stadium
JST (UTC+09)

17 June 2000 19	Urawa Red Diamonds	4-2	Vegalta Sendai	Urawa Komaba Stadium
JST (UTC+09)

20	bye

24 June 2000 21	Oita Trinita	1-1 (GG) (a.e.t.)	Urawa Red Diamonds	Oita Athletic Stadium
JST (UTC+09)

1 July 2000 22	Urawa Red Diamonds	2-0	Montedio Yamagata	Urawa Komaba Stadium
JST (UTC+09)

9 July 2000 23	Sagan Tosu	2-0	Urawa Red Diamonds	Tosu Stadium
JST (UTC+09)

22 July 2000 24	Urawa Red Diamonds	3-0	Ventforet Kofu	Urawa Komaba Stadium
JST (UTC+09)

29 July 2000 25	Consadole Sapporo	2-1	Urawa Red Diamonds	Sapporo Atsubetsu Park Stadium
JST (UTC+09)

2 August 2000 26	Urawa Red Diamonds	3-1	Albirex Niigata	Urawa Komaba Stadium
JST (UTC+09)

5 August 2000 27	Vegalta Sendai	1-1 (GG) (a.e.t.)	Urawa Red Diamonds	Sendai Stadium
JST (UTC+09)

28	bye

19 August 2000 29	Urawa Red Diamonds	4-1	Oita Trinita	Urawa Komaba Stadium
JST (UTC+09)

27 August 2000 30	Montedio Yamagata	1-2	Urawa Red Diamonds	Yamagata Park Stadium
JST (UTC+09)

2 September 2000 31	Urawa Red Diamonds	3-2 (GG) (a.e.t.)	Mito HollyHock	Urawa Komaba Stadium
JST (UTC+09)

9 September 2000 32	Shonan Bellmare	0-2	Urawa Red Diamonds	Hiratsuka Athletics Stadium
JST (UTC+09)

16 September 2000 33	Urawa Red Diamonds	0-1	Omiya Ardija	Urawa Komaba Stadium
JST (UTC+09)

24 September 2000 34	Ventforet Kofu	0-1	Urawa Red Diamonds	Kose Sports Park Stadium
JST (UTC+09)

28 September 2000 35	Urawa Red Diamonds	1-2 (GG) (a.e.t.)	Consadole Sapporo	Urawa Komaba Stadium
JST (UTC+09)

1 October 2000 36	Albirex Niigata	4-2	Urawa Red Diamonds	Niigata City Athletic Stadium
JST (UTC+09)

7 October 2000 37	Urawa Red Diamonds	1-0 (GG) (a.e.t.)	Vegalta Sendai	Urawa Komaba Stadium
JST (UTC+09)

38	bye

22 October 2000 39	Oita Trinita	0-2	Urawa Red Diamonds	Oita Athletic Stadium
JST (UTC+09)

29 October 2000 40	Urawa Red Diamonds	1-2 (GG) (a.e.t.)	Montedio Yamagata	Urawa Komaba Stadium
JST (UTC+09)

5 November 2000 41	Mito HollyHock	0-1	Urawa Red Diamonds	Hitachi Athletic Stadium
JST (UTC+09)

12 November 2000 42	Urawa Red Diamonds	1-0 (GG) (a.e.t.)	Shonan Bellmare	Urawa Komaba Stadium
JST (UTC+09)

16 November 2000 43	Omiya Ardija	0-1	Urawa Red Diamonds	Omiya Football Stadium
JST (UTC+09)

19 November 2000 44	Urawa Red Diamonds	2-1 (GG) (a.e.t.)	Sagan Tosu	Urawa Komaba Stadium
JST (UTC+09)

=== Emperor's Cup ===
25 November 2000 1st Round	Saitama SC	0-2	Urawa Red Diamonds	Omiya Football Stadium
JST (UTC+09)

3 December 2000 2nd Round	Urawa Red Diamonds	9-0	Honda Lock	Urawa Komaba Stadium
JST (UTC+09)

10 December 2000 3rd Round	Kawasaki Frontale	0-2	Urawa Red Diamonds	Todoroki Athletics Stadium
JST (UTC+09)

17 December 2000 4th Round	Urawa Red Diamonds	1-4	Cerezo Osaka	Urawa Komaba Stadium
JST (UTC+09)

=== J.League Cup ===
12 April 2000 1st Round-1	Kawasaki Frontale	3-0	Urawa Red Diamonds	Todoroki Athletics Stadium
JST (UTC+09)

19 April 2000 1st Round-2	Urawa Red Diamonds	2-1 (2-4 agg.)	Kawasaki Frontale	Urawa Komaba Stadium
JST (UTC+09)

== Player statistics ==
No.	Pos.	Nat.	Player	D.o.B. (Age)	Height / Weight	J.League 2		Emperor's Cup		J.League Cup		Total	
No.	Pos.	Nat.	Player	D.o.B. (Age)	Height / Weight	Apps	Goals	Apps	Goals	Apps	Goals	Apps	Goals
1	GK	(Japan)	Yuki Takita	May 16, 1967 (aged 32)	cm / kg	32	0						
2	DF	(Japan)	Nobuhisa Yamada	September 10, 1975 (aged 24)	cm / kg	39	2						
3	DF	(Uruguay)	Fernando Picun	February 14, 1972 (aged 28)	cm / kg	29	1						
4	MF	(Japan)	Masaki Tsuchihashi	July 23, 1972 (aged 27)	cm / kg	17	1						
5	MF	(Japan)	Toshiya Ishii	January 19, 1978 (aged 22)	cm / kg	39	0						
6	MF	(Serbia and Montenegro)	Željko Petrović	November 13, 1965 (aged 34)	cm / kg	16	0						
7	FW	(Japan)	Masayuki Okano	July 25, 1972 (aged 27)	cm / kg	26	6						
8	MF	(Japan)	Shinji Ono	September 27, 1979 (aged 20)	cm / kg	24	7						
9	FW	(Japan)	Masahiro Fukuda	December 17, 1966 (aged 33)	cm / kg	12	2						
10	MF	(Japan)	Yasushi Fukunaga	March 6, 1973 (aged 27)	cm / kg	22	9						
11	FW	(Japan)	Yuichiro Nagai	February 14, 1979 (aged 21)	cm / kg	29	12						
12	DF	(Japan)	Tsutomu Nishino	March 13, 1971 (aged 28)	cm / kg	27	4						
13	FW	(Japan)	Kenji Oshiba	November 19, 1973 (aged 26)	cm / kg	30	6						
14	DF	(Japan)	Shinji Jojo	August 28, 1977 (aged 22)	cm / kg	5	1						
15	DF	(Japan)	Kohei Morita	July 13, 1976 (aged 23)	cm / kg	4	0						
16	GK	(Japan)	Yohei Nishibe	December 1, 1980 (aged 19)	cm / kg	7	0						
17	GK	(Japan)	Tomoyasu Ando	May 23, 1974 (aged 25)	cm / kg	1	0						
18	MF	(Japan)	Osamu Hirose	June 6, 1965 (aged 34)	cm / kg	7	0						
19	DF	(Japan)	Hideki Uchidate	January 15, 1974 (aged 26)	cm / kg	28	3						
20	MF	(Japan)	Toshiyuki Abe	August 1, 1974 (aged 25)	cm / kg	27	8						
21	DF	(Japan)	Ichiei Muroi	June 22, 1974 (aged 25)	cm / kg	23	1						
22	GK	(Japan)	Hisashi Tsuchida	February 1, 1967 (aged 33)	cm / kg	0	0						
23	DF	(Japan)	Akihiro Tabata	May 15, 1978 (aged 21)	cm / kg	0	0						
24	DF	(Japan)	Tomonobu Hayakawa	July 11, 1977 (aged 22)	cm / kg	0	0						
25	DF	(Japan)	Toru Ojima	February 22, 1976 (aged 24)	cm / kg	0	0						
26	MF	(Japan)	Ryuji Kawai	July 14, 1978 (aged 21)	cm / kg	13	0						
27	DF	(Japan)	Manabu Ikeda	July 3, 1980 (aged 19)	cm / kg	0	0						
28	MF	(Japan)	Katsuyuki Miyazawa	September 15, 1976 (aged 23)	cm / kg	5	1						
29	MF	(Japan)	Tomoyuki Yoshino	July 9, 1980 (aged 19)	cm / kg	20	3						
30	MF	(Japan)	Toru Chishima	May 11, 1981 (aged 18)	cm / kg	0	0						
31	MF	(Japan)	Keita Suzuki	July 8, 1981 (aged 18)	cm / kg	0	0						
32	MF	(Japan)	Genichi Takahashi	June 28, 1980 (aged 19)	cm / kg	0	0						
33	DF	(Japan)	Ryuji Michiki	August 25, 1973 (aged 26)	cm / kg	14	0						
34	FW	(Poland)	Andrzej Kubica	July 7, 1972 (aged 27)	cm / kg	34	11						
35	MF	(Brazil)	Adiel	August 13, 1980 (aged 19)	cm / kg	10	2						
