= 1997 Urawa Red Diamonds season =

Urawa Red Diamonds
1997 season
- Manager: Horst Köppel
- Stadium: Urawa Komaba Stadium
- J.League: 10th
- Emperor's Cup: 4th Round
- J.League Cup: Quarterfinals
- Top goalscorer: Masahiro Fukuda (21)
Home colours	Away colours

1997 Urawa Red Diamonds season

== Competitions ==
Competitions	Position
J.League	10th / 17 clubs
Emperor's Cup	4th round
J.League Cup	Quarterfinals

== Domestic results ==
=== J.League ===
12 April 1997 1-1	Urawa Red Diamonds	2-3	Yokohama Marinos	Urawa Komaba Stadium
JST (UTC+09)

16 April 1997 1-2	Shimizu S-Pulse	0-1	Urawa Red Diamonds	Nihondaira Sports Stadium
JST (UTC+09)

19 April 1997 1-3	Urawa Red Diamonds	0-1	Sanfrecce Hiroshima	Tokyo National Stadium
JST (UTC+09)

23 April 1997 1-4	Urawa Red Diamonds	0-3	Urawa Red Diamonds	Hakatanomori Football Stadium
JST (UTC+09)

26 April 1997 1-5	Urawa Red Diamonds	1-2	Cerezo Osaka	Urawa Komaba Stadium
JST (UTC+09)

3 May 1997 1-6	Vissel Kobe	0-2	Urawa Red Diamonds	Kobe Universiade Memorial Stadium
JST (UTC+09)

7 May 1997 1-7	Urawa Red Diamonds	1-3	Kashima Antlers	Urawa Komaba Stadium
JST (UTC+09)

10 May 1997 1-8	Nagoya Grampus Eight	3-1	Urawa Red Diamonds	Mizuho Athletic Stadium
JST (UTC+09)

2 July 1997 1-9	Urawa Red Diamonds	1-3	Yokohama Flügels	Urawa Komaba Stadium
JST (UTC+09)

24 May 1997 1-10	Júbilo Iwata	2-0	Urawa Red Diamonds	Júbilo Iwata Stadium
JST (UTC+09)

28 May 1997 1-11	Urawa Red Diamonds	3-2 (GG) (a.e.t.)	Kashiwa Reysol	Urawa Komaba Stadium
JST (UTC+09)

1-12	bye

5 July 1997 1-13	Gamba Osaka	1-2	Urawa Red Diamonds	Osaka Expo '70 Stadium
JST (UTC+09)

9 July 1997 1-14	Urawa Red Diamonds	2-0	Verdy Kawasaki	Urawa Komaba Stadium
JST (UTC+09)

12 July 1997 1-15	Kyoto Purple Sanga	1-1 (GG) (a.e.t.) (3-4 p)	Urawa Red Diamonds	Nishikyogoku Athletic Stadium
JST (UTC+09)

16 July 1997 1-16	Urawa Red Diamonds	3-0	JEF United Ichihara	Urawa Komaba Stadium
JST (UTC+09)

19 July 1997 1-17	Bellmare Hiratsuka	3-2	Urawa Red Diamonds	Hiratsuka Athletics Stadium
JST (UTC+09)

30 July 1997 2-1	JEF United Ichihara	1-0 (GG) (a.e.t.)	Urawa Red Diamonds	Ichihara Seaside Stadium
JST (UTC+09)

2 August 1997 2-2	Yokohama Marinos	0-2	Urawa Red Diamonds	Yokohama Mitsuzawa Stadium
JST (UTC+09)

6 August 1997 2-3	Urawa Red Diamonds	3-4	Shimizu S-Pulse	Urawa Komaba Stadium
JST (UTC+09)

9 August 1997 2-4	Sanfrecce Hiroshima	1-2	Urawa Red Diamonds	Hiroshima Big Arch
JST (UTC+09)

16 August 1997 2-5	Urawa Red Diamonds	1-2	Avispa Fukuoka	Urawa Komaba Stadium
JST (UTC+09)

20 August 1997 2-6	Cerezo Osaka	1-2	Urawa Red Diamonds	Osaka Nagai Stadium
JST (UTC+09)

23 August 1997 2-7	Urawa Red Diamonds	2-0	Vissel Kobe	Urawa Komaba Stadium
JST (UTC+09)

30 August 1997 2-8	Kashima Antlers	1-0	Urawa Red Diamonds	Kashima Soccer Stadium
JST (UTC+09)

3 September 1997 2-9	Urawa Red Diamonds	3-0	Nagoya Grampus Eight	Urawa Komaba Stadium
JST (UTC+09)

6 September 1997 2-10	Yokohama Flügels	1-3	Urawa Red Diamonds	Yokohama Mitsuzawa Stadium
JST (UTC+09)

10 September 1997 2-11	Urawa Red Diamonds	4-1	Kyoto Purple Sanga	Urawa Komaba Stadium
JST (UTC+09)

13 September 1997 2-12	Urawa Red Diamonds	0-1 (GG) (a.e.t.)	Júbilo Iwata	Urawa Komaba Stadium
JST (UTC+09)

2-13	bye

24 September 1997 2-14	Kashiwa Reysol	3-0	Urawa Red Diamonds	Hitachi Kashiwa Soccer Stadium
JST (UTC+09)

27 September 1997 2-15	Urawa Red Diamonds	1-4	Gamba Osaka	Tokyo National Stadium
JST (UTC+09)

1 October 1997 2-16	Verdy Kawasaki	1-2	Urawa Red Diamonds	Tokyo National Stadium
JST (UTC+09)

4 October 1997 2-17	Urawa Red Diamonds	1-0 (GG) (a.e.t.)	Bellmare Hiratsuka	Urawa Komaba Stadium
JST (UTC+09)

=== Emperor's Cup ===
1st Round	bye

2nd Round	bye

14 December 1997 3rd Round	Urawa Red Diamonds	2-1	NTT Kanto	Urawa Komaba Stadium
JST (UTC+09)

20 December 1997 4th Round	Urawa Red Diamonds	1-2 (GG) (a.e.t.)	Gamba Osaka	Tottori Soccer Stadium
JST (UTC+09)

=== J.League Cup ===
8 March 1997 GL-C-1	Sagan Tosu	0-0	Urawa Red Diamonds	Tosu Stadium
JST (UTC+09)

15 March 1997 GL-C-2	Urawa Red Diamonds	1-1	Kashima Antlers	Urawa Komaba Stadium
JST (UTC+09)

19 March 1997 GL-C-3	Cerezo Osaka	1-1	Urawa Red Diamonds	Osaka Nagai Stadium
JST (UTC+09)

22 March 1997 GL-C-4	Kashima Antlers	0-0	Urawa Red Diamonds	Kashima Soccer Stadium
JST (UTC+09)

26 March 1997 GL-C-5	Urawa Red Diamonds	3-1	Cerezo Osaka	Urawa Komaba Stadium
JST (UTC+09)

29 March 1997 GL-C-6	Urawa Red Diamonds	4-0	Sagan Tosu	Urawa Komaba Stadium
JST (UTC+09)

15 October 1997 Quarterfinals-1	Urawa Red Diamonds	0-0	Júbilo Iwata	Urawa Komaba Stadium
JST (UTC+09)

18 October 1997 Quarterfinals-2	Júbilo Iwata	3-2 (3-2 agg.)	Urawa Red Diamonds	Júbilo Iwata Stadium
JST (UTC+09)

== Player statistics ==
No.	Pos.	Nat.	Player	D.o.B. (Age)	Height / Weight	J.League		Emperor's Cup		J.League Cup		Total	
No.	Pos.	Nat.	Player	D.o.B. (Age)	Height / Weight	Apps	Goals	Apps	Goals	Apps	Goals	Apps	Goals
1	GK	(Japan)	Hisashi Tsuchida	February 1, 1967 (aged 30)	187 cm / 87 kg	14	0	2	0	2	0	18	0
2	MF	(Japan)	Masaki Tsuchihashi	July 23, 1972 (aged 24)	175 cm / 69 kg	31	0	2	0	8	3	41	3
3	DF	(Japan)	Yoshinori Taguchi	September 14, 1965 (aged 31)	184 cm / 79 kg	0	0	0	0	0	0	0	0
4	DF	(France)	Boli	January 2, 1967 (aged 30)	180 cm / 81 kg	9	0	0	0	3	0	12	0
5	MF	(Japan)	Takafumi Hori	September 10, 1967 (aged 29)	177 cm / 74 kg	29	3	0	0	8	2	37	5
6	DF	(Germany)	Buchwald	January 24, 1961 (aged 36)	188 cm / 88 kg	32	2	0	0	6	0	38	2
7	FW	(Japan)	Masayuki Okano	July 25, 1972 (aged 24)	175 cm / 69 kg	23	4	2	1	0	0	25	5
8	MF	(Japan)	Osamu Hirose	June 6, 1965 (aged 31)	174 cm / 72 kg	19	1	0	0	4	0	23	1
9	FW	(Japan)	Masahiro Fukuda	December 27, 1966 (aged 30)	175 cm / 74 kg	29	21	0	0	8	4	37	25
10	MF	(Austria)	Baur	April 16, 1969 (aged 27)	181 cm / 74 kg	2	0	0	0	5	1	7	1
11	MF	(Japan)	Yasushi Fukunaga	March 6, 1973 (aged 24)	172 cm / 64 kg	0	0	2	1	5	0	7	1
12	DF	(Japan)	Tsutomu Nishino	March 13, 1971 (aged 25)	187 cm / 76 kg	25	3	1	0	5	0	31	3
13	MF/DF	(Japan)	Nobuhisa Yamada	September 10, 1975 (aged 21)	175 cm / 66 kg	22	1	2	0	6	0	30	1
14	MF	(Japan)	Hiromitsu Isogai	April 19, 1969 (aged 27)	176 cm / 74 kg	10	3	1	0	0	0	11	3
15	MF	(Japan)	Koichi Sugiyama	October 27, 1971 (aged 25)	176 cm / 78 kg	8	0	2	0	3	0	13	0
16	GK	(Japan)	Yuki Takita	May 16, 1967 (aged 29)	184 cm / 80 kg	18	0	0	0	6	0	24	0
17	MF	(Japan)	Ken Iwase	July 8, 1975 (aged 21)	175 cm / 70 kg	0	0	0	0	0	0	0	0
18	MF/DF	(Japan)	Nobuyasu Ikeda	May 18, 1970 (aged 26)	171 cm / 63 kg	9	0	0	0	0	0	9	0
20	GK	(Japan)	Masahiro Ota	April 28, 1970 (aged 26)	185 cm / 84 kg	0	0	0	0	0	0	0	0
21	MF	(Japan)	Nobutake Mochiyama	April 5, 1973 (aged 23)	181 cm / 72 kg	0	0	0	0	0	0	0	0
22	DF	(Japan)	Shinji Jojo	August 28, 1977 (aged 19)	180 cm / 72 kg	18	0	0	0	6	0	24	0
23	MF	(Japan)	Hideki Uchidate	January 15, 1974 (aged 23)	180 cm / 65 kg	11	0	0	0	2	0	13	0
24	FW	(Japan)	Kenji Oshiba	November 19, 1973 (aged 23)	174 cm / 71 kg	29	2	1	0	8	0	38	2
25	MF	(Japan)	Naoto Sakurai	September 2, 1975 (aged 21)	170 cm / 62 kg	2	0	1	0	2	0	5	0
26	MF	(Japan)	Toshiya Ishii	January 19, 1978 (aged 19)	174 cm / 66 kg	0	0	2	0	0	0	2	0
27	DF	(Japan)	Atsuo Watanabe	April 15, 1974 (aged 22)	180 cm / 70 kg	0	0	0	0	0	0	0	0
28	FW	(Japan)	Taichi Sato	August 23, 1977 (aged 19)	184 cm / 77 kg	6	0	0	0	0	0	6	0
29	DF	(Japan)	Akihiro Tabata	May 15, 1978 (aged 18)	185 cm / 77 kg	19	0	0	0	6	1	25	1
30	MF	(Japan)	Eiji Hanayama	August 21, 1977 (aged 19)	190 cm / 73 kg	0	0	0	0	0	0	0	0
31	GK	(Japan)	Hiroki Aratani	August 6, 1975 (aged 21)	192 cm / 89 kg	0	0	0	0	0	0	0	0
32	GK	(Japan)	Tomoyasu Ando	May 23, 1974 (aged 22)	182 cm / 73 kg	0	0	0	0	0	0	0	0
33	MF	(Japan)	Ryuji Kawai	July 14, 1978 (aged 18)	183 cm / 75 kg	0	0	0	0	0	0	0	0
34	DF	(Japan)	Takashi Sanbonsuge	June 5, 1978 (aged 18)	181 cm / 73 kg	0	0	0	0	0	0	0	0
35	FW	(Japan)	Yuichiro Nagai	February 14, 1979 (aged 18)	184 cm / 70 kg	30	3	2	0	6	0	38	3
36	GK	(Japan)	Koji Honma	April 27, 1977 (aged 19)	185 cm / 82 kg	0	0	0	0	0	0	0	0
19	DF	(Netherlands)	Nijhuis †	March 23, 1966 (aged 30)	-cm / -kg	16	4	2	0	2	0	20	4
10	MF	(Spain)	Begiristain †	August 12, 1964 (aged 32)	-cm / -kg	15	4	2	0	2	0	19	4
37	MF	(Serbia and Montenegro)	Petrović †	November 13, 1965 (aged 31)	-cm / -kg	0	0	2	1	0	0	2	1

- † player(s) joined the team after the opening of this season.

== Transfers ==
In:

No.	Pos.	Nation	Player
32	GK	JPN	Tomoyasu Ando (from Komazawa University)
27	DF	JPN	Atsuo Watanabe (from Nihon University)
29	DF	JPN	Akihiro Tabata (from Seibudai High School)
34	DF	JPN	Takashi Sanbonsuge (from Kojo High School)
10	MF	AUT	Michael Baur (from Tirol Innsbruck)
14	MF	JPN	Hiromitsu Isogai (from Gamba Osaka)
33	MF	JPN	Ryuji Kawai (from Seibudai High School)
35	FW	JPN	Yuichiro Nagai (from Mitsubishi Yowa SS)

Out:

No.	Pos.	Nation	Player
—	DF	JPN	Futoshi Ikeda (retired)
—	DF	JPN	Yoshio Takahashi (retired)
—	DF	JPN	Mitsuhiro Iga (retired)
—	MF	GER	Bein (to VfB Gießen)
—	MF	JPN	Takeshi Nakashima (to Avispa Fukuoka)
—	MF	JPN	Masao Kamino (retired)
—	MF	DEN	Nielsen (to OB Odense)
—	FW	JPN	Shingo Suzuki (to Yokogawa Electric)

== Transfers during the season ==
=== In ===
- (Netherlands) Alfred Nijhuis (from MSV Duisburg on July)
- (Spain) Aitor Begiristain Mújica (from Deportivo La Coruña on July)
- (Serbia and Montenegro) Željko Petrović (from PSV Eindhoven on November)

=== Out ===
- (Austria) Baur (to Tirol Innsbruck on May)
- (Japan) Tomoyasu Ando (loan to Avispa Fukuoka on September)

== Awards ==
none

== Other pages ==
- (in Japanese) J. League official site
- (in Japanese) Urawa Red Diamonds official site
