= Ken Iwase =

Japanese footballer and manager

Ken Iwase 岩瀬 健
Personal information
- Full name: Ken Iwase
- Date of birth: July 8, 1975 (age 51)
- Place of birth: Gunma, Japan
- Height: 1.77 m (5 ft 9 1/2 in)
- Position: Midfielder

Youth career
- 1991–1993: Narashino High School

Senior career*
Years	Team	Apps	(Gls)
1994–1998	Urawa Red Diamonds	30	(3)
1998–2002	Omiya Ardija	69	(8)
Total		99	(11)

Managerial career
- 2018: Kashiwa Reysol
- 2021: Omiya Ardija
- * Club domestic league appearances and goals

Ken Iwase (岩瀬 健, Iwase Ken; born July 8, 1975) is a former Japanese football player and current assistant manager of J2 league team Oita Trinita.

== Playing career ==
Iwase was born in Gunma Prefecture on July 8, 1975. After graduating from high school, he joined Urawa Red Diamonds in 1994. he debuted in 1995 and he played many matches in 1996. However he could hardly play in the match from 1997. In September 1998, he moved to Japan Football League club Omiya Ardija. He became a regular player immediately and the club was promoted to J2 League from 1999. However his opportunity to play decreased from 2000 and he retired end of 2002 season.

== Coaching career ==
After retirement, Iwase started coaching career at Urawa Red Diamonds from 2005. He mainly coached youth team until 2012. In 2013, he moved to Kashiwa Reysol and coached youth team. In 2017, he became a coach for top team. In November 2018, he became a manager as Nozomu Kato successor and Iwase managed last 2 matches in 2018 season. Although Reysol won the 2 matches, the club finished at the 17 place of 18 clubs and was relegated to J2 League. He also resigned end of 2018 season. In December 2020, he was appointed as head coach of Omiya Ardija

== Career statistics ==
Appearances and goals by club, season and competition
Club	Season	League			Emperor's Cup		J.League Cup		Total	
Club	Season	Division	Apps	Goals	Apps	Goals	Apps	Goals	Apps	Goals
Urawa Red Diamonds	1994	J1 League	0	0	0	0	0	0	0	0
Urawa Red Diamonds	1995	J1 League	9	0	0	0	-		9	0
Urawa Red Diamonds	1996	J1 League	21	3	1	1	11	0	33	4
Urawa Red Diamonds	1997	J1 League	0	0	0	0	0	0	0	0
Urawa Red Diamonds	1998	J1 League	0	0	0	0	4	0	4	0
Omiya Ardija	1998	JFL	9	1			-		9	1
Omiya Ardija	1999	J2 League	32	5			2	0	34	5
Omiya Ardija	2000	J2 League	6	0			0	0	6	0
Omiya Ardija	2001	J2 League	20	2			0	0	20	2
Omiya Ardija	2002	J2 League	2	0			-		2	0
Career total			99	11	1	1	17	0	117	12

== Managerial statistics ==
Team	From	To	Record				
Team	From	To	G	W	D	L	Win %
Kashiwa Reysol	2018	2018	2	2	0	0	100.00
Omiya Ardija	2021	2021	0	0	0	0	—
Total			2	2	0	0	100.00
