= Yasushi Fukunaga =

Japanese footballer

Yasushi Fukunaga 福永 泰
Personal information
- Full name: Yasushi Fukunaga
- Date of birth: March 6, 1973 (age 53)
- Place of birth: Machida, Tokyo, Japan
- Height: 1.72 m (5 ft 7 1/2 in)
- Positions: Midfielder; forward

Youth career
- 1988–1990: Toin Gakuen High School
- 1991–1994: Aoyama Gakuin University

Senior career*
Years	Team	Apps	(Gls)
1995–2001	Urawa Reds	130	(26)
2002–2003	Vegalta Sendai	13	(0)
Total		143	(26)
- * Club domestic league appearances and goals

Yasushi Fukunaga (福永 泰, Fukunaga Yasushi; born March 6, 1973) is a former Japanese football player.

== Playing career ==
Fukunaga was born in Machida on March 6, 1973. After graduating from Aoyama Gakuin University, he joined Urawa Reds in 1995. He played many matches as forward from first season. However he could hardly play in the match for Guillain–Barré syndrome in 1997. From 1998, he played many matches as mainly central midfielder. However his opportunity to play decreased in 2001 and he moved to newly was promoted to J1 League club, Vegalta Sendai in 2002. However he could not play many matches and retired end of 2003 season.

== Career statistics ==
Appearances and goals by club, season and competition
Club	Season	League			Emperor's Cup		J.League Cup		Total	
Club	Season	Division	Apps	Goals	Apps	Goals	Apps	Goals	Apps	Goals
Urawa Reds	1995	J1 League	26	4	3	0	—		29	4
Urawa Reds	1996	J1 League	28	6	4	1	13	2	45	9
Urawa Reds	1997	J1 League	0	0	2	1	5	0	7	1
Urawa Reds	1998	J1 League	31	4	0	0	3	2	34	6
Urawa Reds	1999	J1 League	14	3	0	0	2	1	16	4
Urawa Reds	2000	J2 League	22	9	4	0	2	0	28	9
Urawa Reds	2001	J1 League	9	0	0	0	1	0	10	0
Vegalta Sendai	2002	J1 League	6	0	0	0	0	0	6	0
Vegalta Sendai	2003	J1 League	7	0	0	0	1	0	8	0
Career total			143	26	13	2	27	5	183	33
