= Shinji Jojo =

Japanese footballer

Shinji Jojo 城定 信次
Personal information
- Date of birth: August 28, 1977 (age 49)
- Place of birth: Hamura, Tokyo, Japan
- Height: 1.80 m (5 ft 11 in)
- Position: Defender

Youth career
- 1993–1995: Funabashi High School

Senior career*
Years	Team	Apps	(Gls)
1996–2003	Urawa Reds	80	(2)
2002	→Albirex Niigata	1	(0)
2004–2006	Shonan Bellmare	74	(0)
Total		155	(2)

International career
1997	Japan U-20	5	(2)
Medal record
Urawa Reds
Winner	J.League Cup	2003
Runner-up	J.League Cup	2002
- * Club domestic league appearances and goals

Shinji Jojo (城定 信次, Jojo Shinji; born August 28, 1977) is a former Japanese football player.

== Club career ==
Jojo was born in Hamura on August 28, 1977. After graduating from high school, he joined the Urawa Reds in 1996. In 1997, he played several matches as left side midfielder and left side back. However, he did not play as much in 2000. He moved to Albirex Niigata on loan in September 2002 and he returned to the Urawa Reds in 2003. However, he did not play much. He moved to Shonan Bellmare in 2004. He played often as left side back. He retired at the end of the 2006 season.

== National team career ==
In June 1997, Jojo was selected by the Japan U-20 national team for the 1997 World Youth Championship. In that tournament, he played full-time in all five matches as left side midfielder and scored two goals.

== Club statistics ==
Club performance			League		Cup		League Cup		Total	
Season	Club	League	Apps	Goals	Apps	Goals	Apps	Goals	Apps	Goals
Japan			League		Emperor's Cup		J.League Cup		Total	
1996	Urawa Reds	J1 League	2	0	0	0	5	0	7	0
1997	Urawa Reds	J1 League	18	0	0	0	6	0	24	0
1998	Urawa Reds	J1 League	22	0	0	0	4	0	26	0
1999	Urawa Reds	J1 League	18	1	2	0	0	0	20	1
2000	Urawa Reds	J2 League	5	1	0	0	1	0	6	1
2001	Urawa Reds	J1 League	12	0	4	0	1	0	17	0
2002	Urawa Reds	J1 League	3	0	0	0	0	0	3	0
2002	Albirex Niigata	J2 League	1	0	0	0	-		1	0
2003	Urawa Reds	J1 League	0	0	0	0	0	0	0	0
2004	Shonan Bellmare	J2 League	33	0			-		33	0
2005	Shonan Bellmare	J2 League	22	0			-		22	0
2006	Shonan Bellmare	J2 League	19	0			-		19	0
Total			155	2	6	0	17	0	178	2
