= Yuki Takita =

Japanese footballer (born 1967)

Personal information
- Full name: Yuki Takita
- Date of birth: May 16, 1967 (age 59)
- Place of birth: Saitama, Japan
- Height: 1.83 m (6 ft 0 in)
- Position: Goalkeeper

Youth career
- 1983–1985: Omiya Higashi High School
- 1986–1989: Tokai University

Senior career*
Years	Team	Apps	(Gls)
1990–1992	NTT Kanto	40	(0)
1992–2000	Urawa Red Diamonds	146	(1)
Total		186	(1)
- * Club domestic league appearances and goals

Yuki Takita (田北 雄気, Takita Yūki; born May 16, 1967) is a Japanese footballer.

== Playing career ==
Takita was born in Saitama on May 16, 1967. After graduating from Tokai University, he joined his local club NTT Kanto in 1990. He played many matches as goalkeeper from first season. In 1992, he moved to Urawa Red Diamonds. He battles with Hisashi Tsuchida for the position for a long time. He could hardly play in the match until 1995. In 1996, he played full time in all matches because Tsuchida had been hurt. He also scored a goal against Yokohama Flügels with a penalty shot on November 9, 1996. He became the first J1 League goalkeeper to score in the league. From 1997, he played many matches and became a regular goalkeeper from 1999. He retired along with rival Tsuchida at the end of the 2000 season.

== Club statistics ==
Club performance			League		Cup		League Cup		Total	
Season	Club	League	Apps	Goals	Apps	Goals	Apps	Goals	Apps	Goals
Japan			League		Emperor's Cup		J.League Cup		Total	
1990/91	NTT Kanto	JSL Division 2	15	0			0	0	15	0
1991/92	NTT Kanto	JSL Division 2	25	0			1	0	26	0
1992	Urawa Red Diamonds	J1 League	-		0	0	0	0	0	0
1993	Urawa Red Diamonds	J1 League	14	0	0	0	3	0	17	0
1994	Urawa Red Diamonds	J1 League	0	0	0	0	0	0	0	0
1995	Urawa Red Diamonds	J1 League	5	0	0	0	-		5	0
1996	Urawa Red Diamonds	J1 League	30	1	4	0	14	0	48	1
1997	Urawa Red Diamonds	J1 League	18	0	0	0	6	0	24	0
1998	Urawa Red Diamonds	J1 League	17	0	3	0	0	0	20	0
1999	Urawa Red Diamonds	J1 League	30	0	2	0	4	0	36	0
2000	Urawa Red Diamonds	J2 League	32	0	0	0	0	0	32	0
Total			186	1	9	0	28	0	223	1
