= Kenji Oshiba =

Japanese footballer

Kenji Oshiba 大柴 健二
Personal information
- Full name: Kenji Oshiba
- Date of birth: 19 November 1973 (age 52)
- Place of birth: Kofu, Yamanashi, Japan
- Height: 1.76 m (5 ft 9 1/2 in)
- Position: Forward

Youth career
- 1989–1991: Tokai University Kofu High School
- 1992–1995: Kokushikan University

Senior career*
Years	Team	Apps	(Gls)
1996–2000	Urawa Reds	124	(27)
2001–2002	Cerezo Osaka	34	(12)
2002	Kashiwa Reysol	1	(0)
2003	Yokohama FC	8	(0)
Total		167	(39)
Medal record
Cerezo Osaka
Runner-up	Emperor's Cup	2001
- * Club domestic league appearances and goals

Kenji Oshiba (大柴 健二, Oshiba Kenji; born 19 November 1973) is a former Japanese football player.

== Playing career ==
Oshiba was born in Kofu on 19 November 1973. After graduating from Kokushikan University, he joined J1 League club Urawa Reds in 1996. He played many matches as a forward from his first season and became a regular player in 1997. The club was relegated to J2 League from 2000. In 2000, the club won 2nd place and returned to J1 in a year. However he moved to Cerezo Osaka in 2001. He became a regular player and the club won the 2nd place 2001 Emperor's Cup. However the club results in league competition were bad and the club was relegated to J2 from 2002. In 2002 season, his opportunity to play decreased and he moved to Kashiwa Reysol in August. However he could hardly play in the match. In 2003, he moved to J2 club Yokohama FC. He retired in July 2003.

== Career statistics ==
Appearances and goals by club, season and competition
Club	Season	League			Emperor's Cup		J.League Cup		Total	
Club	Season	Division	Apps	Goals	Apps	Goals	Apps	Goals	Apps	Goals
Urawa Reds	1996	J1 League	17	3	0	0	3	2	20	5
Urawa Reds	1997	J1 League	29	2	1	0	8	0	38	2
Urawa Reds	1998	J1 League	30	14	3	2	4	3	37	19
Urawa Reds	1999	J1 League	18	2	2	0	3	1	23	3
Urawa Reds	2000	J2 League	30	6	0	0	2	1	32	7
Cerezo Osaka	2001	J1 League	22	9	5	0	2	0	29	9
Cerezo Osaka	2002	J2 League	12	3	0	0	—		12	3
Kashiwa Reysol	2002	J1 League	1	0	0	0	0	0	1	0
Yokohama FC	2003	J2 League	8	0	0	0	—		8	0
Career total			167	39	11	2	22	7	200	48
