= Nobuhisa Yamada =

Japanese footballer

Nobuhisa Yamada 山田 暢久
Personal information
- Full name: Nobuhisa Yamada
- Date of birth: 10 September 1975 (age 51)
- Place of birth: Fujieda, Shizuoka, Japan
- Height: 1.75 m (5 ft 9 in)
- Positions: Defender; midfielder

Youth career
- 1991–1993: Fujieda Higashi High School

Senior career*
Years	Team	Apps	(Gls)
1994–2013	Urawa Reds	540	(27)
Total		540	(27)

International career
1995	Japan U-20	4	(1)
2002–2004	Japan	15	(1)
Medal record
Urawa Reds
Winner	AFC Champions League	2007
Winner	J1 League	2006
Runner-up	J1 League	2004
Runner-up	J1 League	2005
Runner-up	J1 League	2007
Winner	J.League Cup	2003
Runner-up	J.League Cup	2002
Runner-up	J.League Cup	2004
Runner-up	J.League Cup	2011
Runner-up	J.League Cup	2013
Winner	Emperor's Cup	2005
Winner	Emperor's Cup	2006
- * Club domestic league appearances and goals

Nobuhisa Yamada (山田 暢久, Yamada Nobuhisa; born 10 September 1975) is a former Japanese football player. He played for Japan national team.

Yamada mainly played on the right as a defender or midfielder. He spent his entire professional career at Urawa Reds of J1 League with more than 500 league appearances. He earned 15 caps playing for Japan.

== Club career ==
Yamada was educated at and played for Fujieda Higashi High School. After graduating from high school, he joined Urawa Reds in 1994. He made his first league appearance on 27 April 1994 against Shimizu S-Pulse at Kusanagi Athletic Stadium. His first professional goal came on 19 November 1994 against Yokohama Marinos at Toyama Stadium.

Although he mainly played as a right-side defender or midfielder, he had also played as a stopper, libero, and attacking midfielder. He played more than 500 league matches for Urawa and also served captain from 2004 to 2008. The club won the champions 2006 J1 League, 2003 J.League Cup, 2005 and 2006 Emperor's Cup. In Asia, the club won the champions 2007 AFC Champions League and the 3rd place 2007 FIFA Club World Cup.

He announced his retirement from the game at the end of the 2013 season.

== National team career ==
Yamada represented Japan at several underage levels. He was a member of the Japan U-20 national team for the 1995 FIFA World Youth Championship hosted by Qatar. He played all 4 matches as right midfielder and scored a goal against Burundi.

He made his full international debut for Japan on 20 November 2002 in a friendly against Argentine at Saitama Stadium 2002. In 2003, he played most matches as right side-back including 2003 Confederations Cup. His first international goal came on 7 February 2004 in a friendly against Malaysia at Kashima Soccer Stadium. He played 15 games and scored 1 goal for Japan until 2004.

== Club statistics ==
Club	Season	League		Emperor's Cup		J.League Cup		Champions League		Other^{1}		Total	
Club	Season	Apps	Goals	Apps	Goals	Apps	Goals	Apps	Goals	Apps	Goals	Apps	Goals
Urawa Reds	1994	15	1	3	0	0	0	-		-		18	1
Urawa Reds	1995	42	1	3	0	-		-		-		45	1
Urawa Reds	1996	30	3	4	1	11	0	-		-		45	4
Urawa Reds	1997	22	1	2	0	6	0	-		-		30	1
Urawa Reds	1998	34	0	3	0	4	0	-		-		41	0
Urawa Reds	1999	29	1	2	1	4	1	-		-		35	3
Urawa Reds	2000	39	2	2	0	2	0	-		-		43	2
Urawa Reds	2001	27	3	4	1	6	0	-		-		37	4
Urawa Reds	2002	28	1	1	0	8	0	-		-		37	1
Urawa Reds	2003	27	3	1	0	11	0	-		-		39	3
Urawa Reds	2004	27	2	4	0	9	2	-		2	0	42	4
Urawa Reds	2005	32	3	5	2	10	1	-		-		47	6
Urawa Reds	2006	32	6	5	0	7	1	-		1	0	45	7
Urawa Reds	2007	29	0	0	0	2	0	9	1	6	0	46	1
Urawa Reds	2008	28	0	2	0	6	0	4	0	-		40	0
Urawa Reds	2009	30	0	1	0	7	1	-		-		38	1
Urawa Reds	2010	27	0	4	0	4	0	-		-		35	0
Urawa Reds	2011	24	0	4	0	4	0	-		-		32	0
Urawa Reds	2012	8	0	2	0	5	0	-		-		15	0
Urawa Reds	2013	10	0	1	0	3	0	1	0	-		15	0
Urawa Reds	Total	540	27	53	5	109	6	14	1	9	0	725	39

^{1}Includes J.League Championship, Japanese Super Cup, A3 Champions Cup and FIFA Club World Cup.

== National team statistics ==
Japan national team
Year	Apps	Goals
2002	1	0
2003	11	0
2004	3	1
Total	15	1

=== National team goals ===
Scores and results list Japan's goal tally first.

==== Under-20 ====
#	Date	Venue	Opponent	Score	Result	Competition
1.	19 April 1995	Khalifa International Stadium, Doha, Qatar	Burundi	2–0	2–0	1995 FIFA World Youth Championship

==== Senior team ====
#	Date	Venue	Opponent	Score	Result	Competition
1.	7 February 2004	Kashima Stadium, Kashima, Japan	Malaysia	3–0	4–0	Friendly

== Honours ==
=== Club ===
Urawa Red Diamonds

- AFC Champions League: 1

2007

- J1 League: 1

2006

- Emperor's Cup: 2

2005, 2006

- J.League Cup: 1

2003

- Japanese Super Cup: 1

2006

== See also ==
- List of one-club men
