= Osaka University of Economics =

Private university in Higashiyodogawa-ku, Osaka, Japan

Coordinates: 34°45′00″N 135°32′39″E

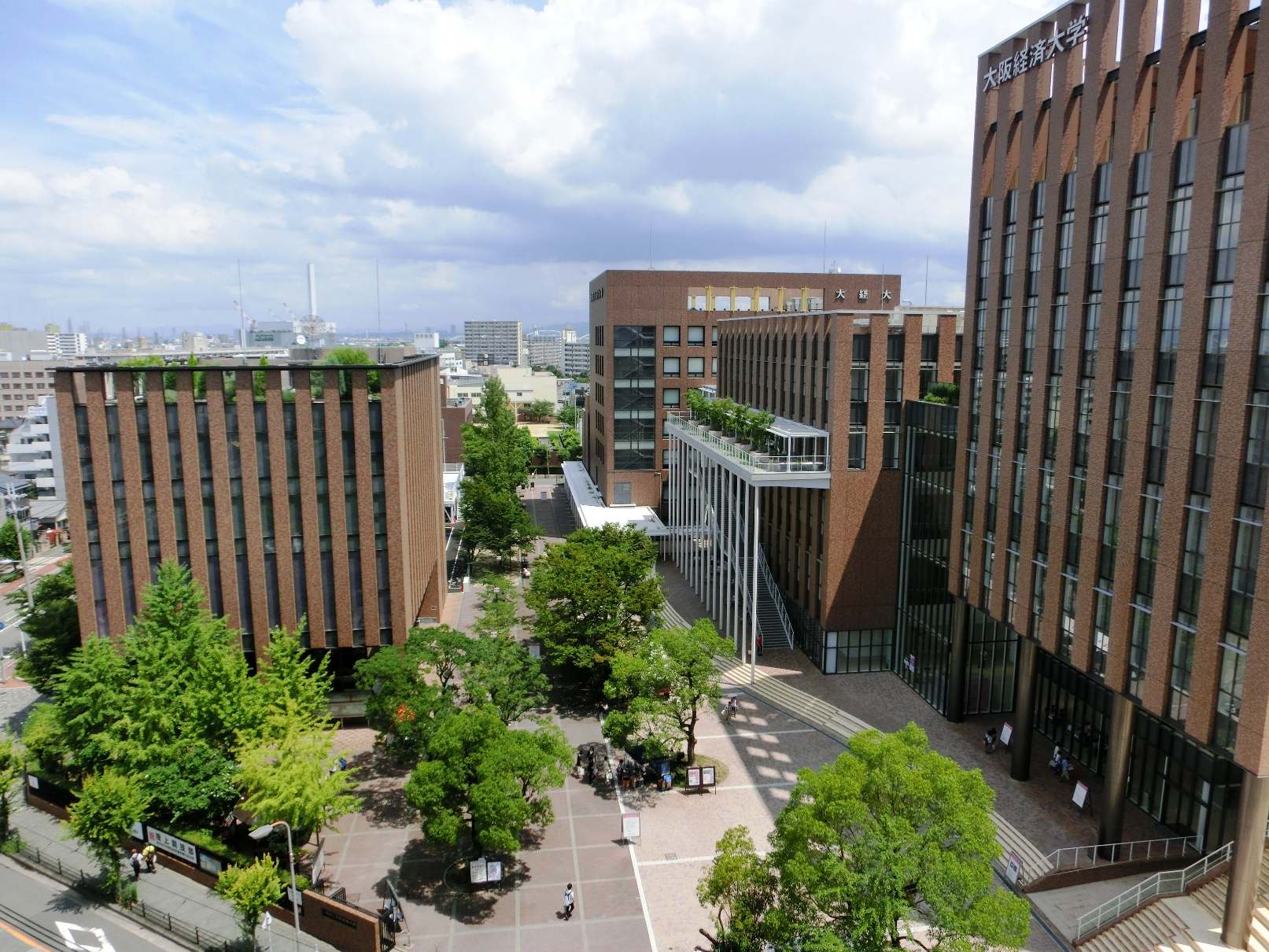
- Type: Private
- Established: Founded 1932, Chartered 1949
- President: Akira Shigemori
- Academic staff: 137 full-time
- Undergraduates: 6,419 (daytime); 998 (evening)
- Postgraduates: 132
- Location: Osaka, Osaka, Japan
- Campus: Urban
- Mascot: None
- Website: www.osaka-ue.ac.jp/english/

Osaka University of Economics (大阪経済大学, Ōsaka keizai daigaku), is a private university located in Higashiyodogawa-ku, Osaka, Japan.

== History ==
It was founded in 1932 as Naniwa Higher Commercial School (浪華高等商業学校). A few years later, difficulties fell upon the school and it was about to be abolished. In 1935, with the large donation by Dr. Iwao Kokusho (黒正巌, 1895–1949), the school was revived as Showa Higher Commercial School (昭和高等商業学校).

During World War II, most of the students were enlisted. So in 1944 Osaka Women's College of Economics (大阪女子経済専門学校) was established instead. In 1946, after the war, the school was reorganized into Osaka College of Economics (大阪経済専門学校), a co-educational school.

In 1949, under Japan's new educational systems, Osaka College of Economics was developed into four-year Osaka University of Economics.

At first OUE had one faculty: Faculty of Economics. OUE added faculties as follows:

- 1964: Faculty of Business Administration
- 1966: Graduate School (Master's degree course in Economics)
- 1968: Doctoral degree course in Economics
- 1997: Faculty of Information Management
- 2002: Faculty of Human Sciences

== Faculties (undergraduate schools) ==
- Economics
- Business Administration
- Information Management
- Human Sciences

== Graduate schools ==
- Economics (Master's course/Doctor's course)
- Business Administration (Master's course only)
- Business Information Systems (Master's course only)
- Human Sciences (Master's course only)

== Institutes ==
- Institute for Research in Economic History of Japan
  - established in 1933 by Dr. Kokusho
- Institute of Small Business Research and Business Administration
