= 2009 FC Gifu season =

F.C. Gifu
2009 season
- Manager: Hideki Matsunaga
- Stadium: Gifu Nagaragawa Stadium
- J. League 2: 12th
- Emperor's Cup: Quarterfinals
- Top goalscorer: Kōichi Satō (16)

2009 F.C. Gifu season

== Competitions ==
Competitions	Position
J. League 2	12th / 18 clubs
Emperor's Cup	Quarterfinals

== Player statistics ==
No.	Pos.	Player	D.o.B. (Age)	Height / Weight	J. League 2		Emperor's Cup		Total	
No.	Pos.	Player	D.o.B. (Age)	Height / Weight	Apps	Goals	Apps	Goals	Apps	Goals
1	GK	Kyohei Noda	October 6, 1981 (aged 27)	cm / kg	50	0				
2	DF	Yasutaka Nomoto	April 27, 1986 (aged 22)	cm / kg	6	0				
3	DF	Kan Kikuchi	May 3, 1977 (aged 31)	cm / kg	35	0				
4	DF	Shuto Tanaka	November 8, 1985 (aged 23)	cm / kg	47	1				
5	DF	Shinya Kawashima	July 20, 1978 (aged 30)	cm / kg	8	0				
6	DF	Hideyoshi Akita	July 23, 1974 (aged 34)	cm / kg	47	2				
7	MF	Kazunori Kan	November 11, 1985 (aged 23)	cm / kg	46	4				
8	MF	Seo Kwan-Soo	February 25, 1980 (aged 29)	cm / kg	18	0				
9	FW	Park Joon-Kyung	February 12, 1986 (aged 23)	cm / kg	18	2				
10	FW	Atsushi Katagiri	August 1, 1983 (aged 25)	cm / kg	19	2				
11	MF	Kazumasa Takagi	December 17, 1984 (aged 24)	cm / kg	47	7				
13	FW	Satoshi Ōtomo	October 1, 1981 (aged 27)	cm / kg	15	0				
14	MF	Shōgo Shimada	November 13, 1979 (aged 29)	cm / kg	51	5				
15	MF	Takuma Nagayoshi	April 18, 1986 (aged 22)	cm / kg	27	0				
16	FW	Yudai Nishikawa	April 19, 1986 (aged 22)	cm / kg	41	11				
17	DF	Shun Nogaito	September 11, 1986 (aged 22)	cm / kg	14	0				
18	FW	Kōichi Satō	November 28, 1986 (aged 22)	cm / kg	43	16				
19	DF	Shinji Tominari	February 22, 1987 (aged 22)	cm / kg	44	3				
20	MF	Kazuki Someya	October 13, 1986 (aged 22)	cm / kg	41	4				
21	GK	Masatoshi Mizutani	July 7, 1987 (aged 21)	cm / kg	2	0				
22	GK	Toshiya Shigenari	September 11, 1990 (aged 18)	cm / kg	0	0				
23	MF	Suguru Hashimoto	June 16, 1982 (aged 26)	cm / kg	37	1				
24	FW	Masato Katayama	April 19, 1984 (aged 24)	cm / kg	11	0				
25	DF	Ryoma Hashiuchi	April 22, 1989 (aged 19)	cm / kg	6	0				
26	FW	Cha Dong-Hoon	November 7, 1989 (aged 19)	cm / kg	1	0				
27	FW	Yuki Oshitani	September 23, 1989 (aged 19)	cm / kg	15	1				
28	DF	Kyohei Suzaki	June 21, 1989 (aged 19)	cm / kg	6	0				
30	DF	Kazunori Yoshimoto	April 24, 1988 (aged 20)	cm / kg	11	2				
31	GK	Takumi Sogabe	July 9, 1983 (aged 25)	cm / kg	0	0				

== Other pages ==
- (in Japanese) J. League official site
