= 2010 FC Gifu season =

F.C. Gifu
2010 season
- Manager: Yasuharu Kurata
- Stadium: Gifu Nagaragawa Stadium
- J. League 2: 14th
- Emperor's Cup: 2nd Round
- Top goalscorer: Yuki Oshitani (9)

2010 F.C. Gifu season

== Competitions ==
Competitions	Position
J. League 2	14th / 19 clubs
Emperor's Cup	2nd Round

== Player statistics ==
No.	Pos.	Player	D.o.B. (Age)	Height / Weight	J. League 2		Emperor's Cup		Total	
No.	Pos.	Player	D.o.B. (Age)	Height / Weight	Apps	Goals	Apps	Goals	Apps	Goals
1	GK	Kyohei Noda	October 6, 1981 (aged 28)	cm / kg	33	0				
2	DF	Yasutaka Nomoto	April 27, 1986 (aged 23)	cm / kg	0	0				
3	DF	Kazunori Yoshimoto	April 24, 1988 (aged 21)	cm / kg	33	0				
4	DF	Shuto Tanaka	November 8, 1985 (aged 24)	cm / kg	29	2				
5	DF	Shinya Kawashima	July 20, 1978 (aged 31)	cm / kg	17	0				
6	DF	Hideyoshi Akita	July 23, 1974 (aged 35)	cm / kg	35	0				
7	MF	Kazunori Kan	November 11, 1985 (aged 24)	cm / kg	32	0				
9	FW	Park Joon-Kyung	February 12, 1986 (aged 24)	cm / kg	0	0				
10	FW	Park Gi-Dong	November 1, 1988 (aged 21)	cm / kg	8	1				
11	MF	Kazuki Someya	October 13, 1986 (aged 23)	cm / kg	21	1				
14	MF	Shōgo Shimada	November 13, 1979 (aged 30)	cm / kg	36	7				
15	MF	Takuma Nagayoshi	April 18, 1986 (aged 23)	cm / kg	28	1				
16	FW	Yudai Nishikawa	April 19, 1986 (aged 23)	cm / kg	36	4				
17	DF	Shun Nogaito	September 11, 1986 (aged 23)	cm / kg	24	2				
18	FW	Kōichi Satō	November 28, 1986 (aged 23)	cm / kg	35	5				
19	DF	Shinji Tominari	February 22, 1987 (aged 23)	cm / kg	14	0				
20	DF	Tomohiro Yamauchi	September 5, 1987 (aged 22)	cm / kg	5	0				
21	GK	Tatsuya Murao	March 26, 1988 (aged 21)	cm / kg	3	0				
22	GK	Toshiya Shigenari	September 11, 1990 (aged 19)	cm / kg	0	0				
23	MF	Suguru Hashimoto	June 16, 1982 (aged 27)	cm / kg	17	0				
24	DF	Kazuki Murakami	December 21, 1987 (aged 22)	cm / kg	16	0				
25	DF	Flavio Pereira	June 21, 1991 (aged 18)	cm / kg	0	0				
26	DF	Kazuto Sakamoto	September 24, 1991 (aged 18)	cm / kg	11	0				
27	FW	Yuki Oshitani	September 23, 1989 (aged 20)	cm / kg	29	9				
28	MF	Symon Gabriel	July 25, 1990 (aged 19)	cm / kg	0	0				
29	MF	Reiichi Ikegami	July 12, 1983 (aged 26)	cm / kg	16	0				
33	MF	Ryohei Arai	November 3, 1990 (aged 19)	cm / kg	12	0				

== Other pages ==
- (in Japanese) J. League official site
