= 2009 Japanese Regional Football League Competition =

Tournament details
- Country: Japan
- Teams: 16

Final positions
- Champions: Matsumoto Yamaga F.C.
- Runner-up: Hitachi Tochigi Soccer Club (Zweigen Kanazawa also promoted via play off)

Tournament statistics
- Matches played: 30

The 33rd annual Japanese Regional Football League Competition took place from 21 November 2009 to 6 December 2009. It took place across the prefectures of Fukushima, Toyama, Tottori, Kōchi and Nagano. It is the tournament which decided promotion to the Japan Football League for the 2010 season. The top two teams in this competition (Matsumoto Yamaga and Hitachi Tochigi Soccer Club) were given promotion to the Japan Football League. Third place Zweigen Kanazawa achieved promotion via a two-leg play off with F.C. Kariya.

== Tournament outline ==
Preliminary round - Four groups of four teams play each other once in a round-robin tournament. The top placed team in each group advances to the final round. Final Round - The four winners from the preliminary round play each other once in a round-robin tournament.

Three points are awarded for a win in standard time and zero for a lose. If at the end of standard time the result is a tie, a penalty shoot-out is held; the winning team is awarded 2 points and the losing team 1.

If the number of points are the same, the league position is ordered by goal difference, then the number of goals scored, and finally the result between the respective teams. If the 1st-place position cannot be decided by these factors, a play off will be contested between top two teams.

== Venues ==
Preliminary round

- Group A - Iwaki Greenfield, Iwaki, Fukushima prefecture
- Group B - Takaoka Sports Core, Takaoka, Toyama prefecture
- Group C - Tottori Athletics Stadium, Tottori, Tottori prefecture
- Group D - Kochi Haruno Athletic Stadium, Kōchi, Kōchi Prefecture

Final round

- Matsumotodaira Football Stadium, Matsumoto, Nagano prefecture

== Participating teams ==
=== 9 Regional League champions ===
- Hokkaido: Satsudai Goal Plunderers
- Tohoku: Grulla Morioka
- Kanto: Yokohama Sports and Culture Club
- Hokushinetsu: College of Upward Players in Soccer
- Tokai: Yazaki Valente
- Kansai: Sanyo Denki Sumoto Football Club
- Chugoku: Renofa Yamaguchi
- Shikoku: Tokushima Vortis Second
- Kyushu: Okinawa Kariyushi

=== Runner-Up from selected leagues ===
Regional Leagues whose representative reached the final round in 2008, are eligible for a second team to represent them.

- Kanto: Hitachi Tochigi Soccer Club
- Chugoku: NTN Okayama S.C.
- Kyushu: Volca Kagoshima

=== High performing teams in the All Japan Senior Football Championship ===
- Matsumoto Yamaga (Hokushinetsu) (winner)
- Zweigen Kanazawa (Hokushinetsu) (runner-up)

=== Invited teams ===
- AS Laranja Kyoto (Kansai)
- Hamamatsu University (Tokai)

== Results ==
=== Preliminary round ===
==== Group A ====
Team	Pld	W	PKW	PKL	L	GF	GA	GD	Pts
Yokohama Sports and Culture Club	3	3	0	0	0	12	0	12	9
Grulla Morioka	3	2	0	0	1	5	3	2	6
NTN Okayama S.C.	3	0	1	0	2	4	13	-9	2
Satsudai Goal Plunderers	3	0	0	1	2	3	8	-5	1

21 November 2009 (11:00, 13:15)
Grulla Morioka	1–0	Satsudai Goal Plunderers	Iwaki Greenfield, Iwaki
NTN Okayama S.C.	0–6	Yokohama Sports and Culture Club	Iwaki Greenfield, Iwaki
22 November 2009 (11:00, 13:15)
Grulla Morioka	4–1	NTN Okayama S.C.	Iwaki Greenfield, Iwaki
Satsudai Goal Plunderers	0–4	Yokohama Sports and Culture Club	Iwaki Greenfield, Iwaki
23 November 2009 (11:00, 13:15)
Grulla Morioka	0–2	Yokohama Sports and Culture Club	Iwaki Greenfield, Iwaki
NTN Okayama S.C.	3–3; PK 2-4	Satsudai Goal Plunderers	Iwaki Greenfield, Iwaki

==== Group B ====
Team	Pld	W	PKW	PKL	L	GF	GA	GD	Pts
Hitachi Tochigi Soccer Club	3	2	0	1	0	9	2	7	7
AS.Laranja Kyoto	3	1	1	1	0	4	3	1	6
College of Upward Players in Soccer	3	1	1	0	1	4	4	0	5
Yazaki Valente	3	0	0	0	3	1	9	-8	0

21 November 2009 (11:00, 13:15)
Hitachi Tochigi Soccer Club	3–1	College of Upward Players in Soccer	Takaoka Sports Core, Takaoka
AS.Laranja Kyoto	2–1	Yazaki Valente	Takaoka Sports Core, Takaoka
22 November 2009 (11:00, 13:15)
Hitachi Tochigi Soccer Club	1–1; PK 4-5	AS.Laranja Kyoto	Takaoka Sports Core, Takaoka
College of Upward Players in Soccer	2–0	Yazaki Valente	Takaoka Sports Core, Takaoka
23 November 2009 (11:00, 13:15)
Hitachi Tochigi Soccer Club	5–0	Yazaki Valente	Takaoka Sports Core, Takaoka
College of Upward Players in Soccer	1–1; PK 4-2	AS.Laranja Kyoto	Takaoka Sports Core, Takaoka

==== Group C ====
Team	Pld	W	PKW	PKL	L	GF	GA	GD	Pts
Matsumoto Yamaga	3	3	0	0	0	12	1	11	9
Renofa Yamaguchi	3	1	1	0	1	5	4	1	5
Okinawa Kariyushi	3	1	0	1	1	7	5	2	5
Hamamatsu University	3	0	0	0	3	1	15	-14	0

21 November 2009 (11:00, 13:15)
Okinawa Kariyushi	1–1; PK 6-7	Renofa Yamaguchi	Tottori Athletics Stadium, Tottori
Matsumoto Yamaga	6–0	Hamamatsu University	Tottori Athletics Stadium, Tottori
22 November 2009 (11:00, 13:15)
Okinawa Kariyushi	1–3	Matsumoto Yamaga	Tottori Athletics Stadium, Tottori
Renofa Yamaguchi	4–0	Hamamatsu University	Tottori Athletics Stadium, Tottori
23 November 2009 (11:00, 13:15)
Okinawa Kariyushi	5–1	Hamamatsu University	Tottori Athletics Stadium, Tottori
Renofa Yamaguchi	0–3	Matsumoto Yamaga	Tottori Athletics Stadium, Tottori

==== Group D ====
Team	Pld	W	PKW	PKL	L	GF	GA	GD	Pts
Zweigen Kanazawa	3	2	1	0	0	5	2	3	8
Sanyo Denki Sumoto Football Club	3	1	0	2	0	3	2	1	5
Volca Kagoshima	3	1	1	0	1	4	4	0	5
Tokushima Vortis Second	3	0	0	0	3	3	7	-4	0

21 November 2009 (11:00, 13:15)
Zweigen Kanazawa	3–1	Tokushima Vortis Second	Kochi Haruno Athletic Stadium, Kōchi
Volca Kagoshima	1–1; PK 8-7	Sanyo Denki Sumoto Football Club	Kochi Haruno Athletic Stadium, Kōchi
22 November 2009 (11:00, 13:15)
Zweigen Kanazawa	2–1	Volca Kagoshima	Kochi Haruno Athletic Stadium, Kōchi
Tokushima Vortis Second	1–2	Sanyo Denki Sumoto Football Club	Kochi Haruno Athletic Stadium, Kōchi
23 November 2009 (11:00, 13:15)
Zweigen Kanazawa	0–0; PK 8-7	Sanyo Denki Sumoto Football Club	Kochi Haruno Athletic Stadium, Kōchi
Tokushima Vortis Second	1–2	Volca Kagoshima	Kochi Haruno Athletic Stadium, Kōchi

=== Final Round ===
Team	Pld	W	PKW	PKL	L	GF	GA	GD	Pts
Matsumoto Yamaga	3	2	0	1	0	3	1	2	7
Hitachi Tochigi Soccer Club	3	2	0	0	1	6	3	3	6
Zweigen Kanazawa	3	0	1	1	1	1	4	-3	3
Yokohama Sports and Culture Club	3	0	1	0	2	2	4	-2	2

4 December 2009 (11:00, 13:15)
Yokohama Sports and Culture Club	1–2	Hitachi Tochigi Soccer Club	Matsumotodaira Football Stadium, Matsumoto
Matsumoto Yamaga	0–0; PK 4-5	Zweigen Kanazawa	Matsumotodaira Football Stadium, Matsumoto
5 December 2009 (11:00, 13:15)
Yokohama Sports and Culture Club	0–1	Matsumoto Yamaga	Matsumotodaira Football Stadium, Matsumoto
Hitachi Tochigi Soccer Club	3–0	Zweigen Kanazawa	Matsumotodaira Football Stadium, Matsumoto
6 December 2009 (11:00, 13:15)
Yokohama Sports and Culture Club	1–1; PK 12-11	Zweigen Kanazawa	Matsumotodaira Football Stadium, Matsumoto
Hitachi Tochigi Soccer Club	1–2	Matsumoto Yamaga	Matsumotodaira Football Stadium, Matsumoto
