= 2008 Japanese Regional Football League Competition =

Tournament details
- Country: Japan
- Teams: 16

Final positions
- Champions: Machida Zelvia
- Runners-up: V-Varen Nagasaki (Honda Lock S.C. also promoted)

Tournament statistics
- Matches played: 30

The 32nd annual Japanese Regional Football League Competition took place from 22 November 2008 to 30 November 2008. It took place across the prefectures of Fukuoka, Kōchi, Tottori and Okinawa. It is the tournament which decided promotion to the Japan Football League for the 2009 season. As three teams were promoted from the Japan Football League to J. League Division 2, the top three teams in this competition were promoted: Machida Zelvia, V-Varen Nagasaki and Honda Lock.

== Tournament outline ==
Preliminary round – Four groups of four teams play each other once in a round-robin tournament. The top-placed team in each group advances to the final round. In the final round, the four winners from the preliminary round play each other once in a round-robin tournament.

Three points are awarded for a win in standard time and zero for a loss. If at the end of standard time the result is a tie, a penalty shoot-out is held; the winning team is awarded 2 points and the losing team 1.

If the number of points are the same, the league position is ordered by goal difference, then the number of goals scored, and finally the result between the respective teams. If the 1st-place position cannot be decided by these factors, a playoff will be contested between the top two teams.

== Venues ==
=== Preliminary round ===
- Group A – Honjō Athletic Stadium, Kitakyushu city, Fukuoka prefecture
- Group B – Kochi Haruno Athletic Stadium, Haruno, Kōchi Prefecture
- Group C – Tottori Bank Bird Stadium, Tottori city, Tottori prefecture
- Group D – Coca-Cola West Sports Park, Tottori city, Tottori prefecture

=== Final Round ===
- Ishigaki Island Soccer Park Anma, Ishigaki city, Okinawa prefecture

== Participating teams ==
=== 9 Regional League champions ===
- Hokkaido: Norbritz Hokkaido
- Tohoku: Grulla Morioka
- Kanto: Machida Zelvia
- Hokushinetsu: Nagano Parceiro
- Tokai: Shizuoka
- Kansai: Banditonce Kakogawa
- Chugoku: Renofa Yamaguchi
- Shikoku: Kamatamare Sanuki
- Kyushu: Okinawa Kariyushi

=== Runner-Up from selected leagues ===
Regional Leagues whose representative reached the final round in 2007, are eligible for a second team to represent them. This would normally be four teams, however this year there were only three.

- Kansai: Ain Food
- Chugoku: Sagawa Express Chugoku
- Kyushu: V-Varen Nagasaki

=== High performing teams in the All Japan Senior Football Championship ===
- NEC Tokin (Tohoku) (runner up)
- Honda Lock (Kyushu) (third place)
- Matsumoto Yamaga (Hokushinetsu) (fourth place)

NEC Tokin were originally announced to participate, however due to poor business performances from their parent company, their entry was withdrawn and replaced by fourth place Matsumoto Yamaga.

=== Invited teams ===
- Tochigi Uva (Kanto)
- Yazaki Valente (Tokai)

== Results ==
=== Preliminary round ===
==== Group A ====
Team	Pld	W	PKW	PKL	L	GF	GA	GD	Pts
Honda Lock	3	1	1	1	0	4	3	1	6
Banditonce Kakogawa	3	1	0	2	0	4	3	1	5
Nagano Parceiro	3	1	1	0	1	6	6	0	5
Okinawa Kariyushi	3	0	1	0	2	3	5	−2	2

22 November 2008 (11:00, 13:15)
Nagano Parceiro	2–2; PK 4–2	Honda Lock	Honjō Athletic Stadium, Kitakyushu city
Okinawa Kariyushi	1–1; PK 4–3	Banditonce Kakogawa	Honjō Athletic Stadium, Kitakyushu city
23 November 2008 (11:00, 13:15)
Nagano Parceiro	2–1	Okinawa Kariyushi	Honjō Athletic Stadium, Kitakyushu city
Honda Lock	0–0; PK 5–4	Banditonce Kakogawa	Honjō Athletic Stadium, Kitakyushu city
24 November 2008 (11:00, 13:15)
Nagano Parceiro	2–3	Banditonce Kakogawa	Honjō Athletic Stadium, Kitakyushu city
Honda Lock	2–1	Okinawa Kariyushi	Honjō Athletic Stadium, Kitakyushu city

==== Group B ====
Team	Pld	W	PKW	PKL	L	GF	GA	GD	Pts
V-Varen Nagasaki	3	3	0	0	0	7	0	7	9
Kamatamare Sanuki	3	1	1	0	1	2	2	0	5
Ain Food	3	0	1	1	1	1	5	−4	3
Tochigi Uva	3	0	0	1	2	1	4	−3	1

22 November 2008 (11:00, 13:15)
Kamatamare Sanuki	2–0	Tochigi Uva	Kochi Haruno Athletic Stadium, Haruno
V-Varen Nagasaki	4–0	Ain Food	Kochi Haruno Athletic Stadium, Haruno
23 November 2008 (11:00, 13:15)
Kamatamare Sanuki	0–2	V-Varen Nagasaki	Kochi Haruno Athletic Stadium, Haruno
Tochigi Uva	1–1; PK 4–5	Ain Food	Kochi Haruno Athletic Stadium, Haruno
24 November 2008 (11:00, 13:15)
Kamatamare Sanuki	0–0; PK 4–2	Ain Food	Kochi Haruno Athletic Stadium, Haruno
Tochigi Uva	0–1	V-Varen Nagasaki	Kochi Haruno Athletic Stadium, Haruno

==== Group C ====
Team	Pld	W	PKW	PKL	L	GF	GA	GD	Pts
Renofa Yamaguchi	3	2	1	0	0	5	3	2	8
Matsumoto Yamaga	3	2	0	1	0	6	4	2	7
Grulla Morioka	3	1	0	0	2	9	5	4	3
Shizuoka	3	0	0	0	3	2	10	−8	0

22 November 2008 (11:00, 13:15)
Renofa Yamaguchi	2–1	Shizuoka	Tottori Bank Bird Stadium, Tottori city
Grulla Morioka	2–3	Matsumoto Yamaga	Tottori Bank Bird Stadium, Tottori city
23 November 2008 (11:00, 13:15)
Renofa Yamaguchi	2–1	Grulla Morioka	Tottori Bank Bird Stadium, Tottori city
Shizuoka	1–2	Matsumoto Yamaga	Tottori Bank Bird Stadium, Tottori city
24 November 2008 (11:00, 13:15)
Renofa Yamaguchi	1–1; PK 5–3	Matsumoto Yamaga	Tottori Bank Bird Stadium, Tottori city
Shizuoka	0–6	Grulla Morioka	Tottori Bank Bird Stadium, Tottori city

==== Group D ====
Team	Pld	W	PKW	PKL	L	GF	GA	GD	Pts
Machida Zelvia	3	2	1	0	0	9	1	8	8
Yazaki Valente	3	2	0	1	0	9	3	6	7
Norbritz Hokkaido	3	1	0	0	2	2	4	−2	3
Sagawa Express Chugoku	3	0	0	0	3	3	15	−12	0

22 November 2008 (11:00, 13:15)
Sagawa Express Chugoku	0–7	Machida Zelvia	Coca-Cola West Sports Park, Tottori city
Yazaki Valente	2–0	Norbritz Hokkaido	Coca-Cola West Sports Park, Tottori city
23 November 2008 (11:00, 13:15)
Sagawa Express Chugoku	2–6	Yazaki Valente	Coca-Cola West Sports Park, Tottori city
Machida Zelvia	1–0	Norbritz Hokkaido	Coca-Cola West Sports Park, Tottori city
24 November 2008 (11:00, 13:15)
Sagawa Express Chugoku	1–2	Norbritz Hokkaido	Coca-Cola West Sports Park, Tottori city
Machida Zelvia	1–1; PK 6–5	Yazaki Valente	Coca-Cola West Sports Park, Tottori city

=== Final Round ===
Team	Pld	W	PKW	PKL	L	GF	GA	GD	Pts
Machida Zelvia	3	2	1	0	0	4	1	3	8
V-Varen Nagasaki	3	2	0	1	0	6	0	6	7
Honda Lock	3	1	0	0	2	3	7	−4	3
Renofa Yamaguchi	3	0	0	0	3	0	5	−5	0

28 November 2008 (11:00, 13:15)
Honda Lock	0–5	V-Varen Nagasaki	Ishigaki Island Soccer Park Anma, Ishigaki city
Renofa Yamaguchi	0–2	Machida Zelvia	Ishigaki Island Soccer Park Anma, Ishigaki city
29 November 2008 (11:00, 13:15)
Honda Lock	2–0	Renofa Yamaguchi	Ishigaki Island Soccer Park Anma, Ishigaki city
V-Varen Nagasaki	0–0; PK 3–5	Machida Zelvia	Ishigaki Island Soccer Park Anma, Ishigaki city
30 November 2008 (10:00, 12:15)
Honda Lock	1–2	Machida Zelvia	Ishigaki Island Soccer Park Anma, Ishigaki city
V-Varen Nagasaki	1–0	Renofa Yamaguchi	Ishigaki Island Soccer Park Anma, Ishigaki city
