= Kyohei Noda =

Japanese footballer

Kyohei Noda 野田 恭平
Personal information
- Full name: Kyohei Noda
- Date of birth: October 6, 1981 (age 45)
- Place of birth: Sagamihara, Japan
- Height: 1.91 m (6 ft 3 in)
- Position: Goalkeeper

Youth career
- 1997–1999: Nihon University High School

Senior career*
Years	Team	Apps	(Gls)
2000–2001	Tokyo Verdy	0	(0)
2002	Okinawa Kariyushi FC		
2003–2008	FC Ryukyu		
2009–2012	FC Gifu	105	(0)
- * Club domestic league appearances and goals

Kyohei Noda (野田 恭平, Noda Kyōhei; born October 6, 1981) is a former Japanese football player.

== Playing career ==
Noda was born in Sagamihara on October 6, 1981. After graduating from high school, he joined J1 League club Verdy Kawasaki (later Tokyo Verdy) in 2000. However he could not play at all in the match behind Kenji Honnami and Shinkichi Kikuchi in 2 seasons. In 2002, he moved to Regional Leagues club Okinawa Kariyushi FC. In 2003, he moved to new club FC Ryukyu in Prefectural Leagues. The club was promoted to Regional Leagues from 2005 and Japan Football League from 2006. He played as regular goalkeeper until 2007. However his opportunity to play decreased behind Raïs M'Bolhi in 2008. In 2009, he moved to J2 League club FC Gifu. He played many matches until 2010. However his opportunity to play decreased from 2011 and he retired end of 2012 season.

== Career statistics ==
Appearances and goals by club, season and competition
Club	Season	League			Emperor's Cup		J.League Cup		Total	
Club	Season	Division	Apps	Goals	Apps	Goals	Apps	Goals	Apps	Goals
Verdy Kawasaki	2000	J1 League	0	0	0	0	0	0	0	0
Tokyo Verdy	2001	J1 League	0	0	0	0	0	0	0	0
Okinawa Kariyushi FC	2002	Regional Leagues			1	0	-		1	0
FC Ryukyu	2003	Prefectural Leagues			-		-			
FC Ryukyu	2004	Prefectural Leagues			0	0	-			
FC Ryukyu	2005	Regional Leagues			3	0	-		3	0
FC Ryukyu	2006	Football League	34	0	2	0	-		36	0
FC Ryukyu	2007	Football League	34	0	-		-		34	0
FC Ryukyu	2008	Football League	12	0	-		-		12	0
FC Gifu	2009	J2 League	50	0	4	0	-		54	0
FC Gifu	2010	J2 League	33	0	1	0	-		34	0
FC Gifu	2011	J2 League	19	0	0	0	-		19	0
FC Gifu	2012	J2 League	3	0	1	0	-		4	0
Career total			185	0	12	0	0	0	197	0
