= 2008 FC Gifu season =

F.C. Gifu
2008 season
- Manager: Hideki Matsunaga
- Stadium: Gifu Nagaragawa Stadium
- J. League 2: 13th
- Emperor's Cup: 4th Round
- Top goalscorer: Atsushi Katagiri (9)
Home colours	Away colours

2008 F.C. Gifu season

== Competitions ==
Competitions	Position
J. League 2	13th / 15 clubs
Emperor's Cup	4th Round

== Domestic results ==
=== J. League 2 ===
Match	Date	Venue	Opponents	Score
1	2008.3.9	Kose Sports Park Stadium	Ventforet Kofu	1-1
2	2008.3.16	Gifu Nagaragawa Stadium	Vegalta Sendai	0-1
3	2008.3.20	ND Soft Stadium Yamagata	Montedio Yamagata	3-5
4	2008.3.23	Gifu Nagaragawa Stadium	Tokushima Vortis	2-1
5	2008.3.29	Osaka Nagai Stadium	Cerezo Osaka	1-0
6	2008.4.6	Gifu Nagaragawa Stadium	Sanfrecce Hiroshima	1-1
7	2008.4.12	Hakatanomori Football Stadium	Avispa Fukuoka	1-5
8	2008.4.19	Gifu Nagaragawa Stadium	Yokohama FC	2-3
9	2008.4.26	Hiratsuka Stadium	Shonan Bellmare	4-2
10	2008.4.29	Kasamatsu Stadium	Mito HollyHock	1-3
11	2008.5.3	Gifu Nagaragawa Stadium	Ehime FC	0-3
12	2008.5.6	Gifu Nagaragawa Stadium	Sagan Tosu	0-1
13	2008.5.11	Kumamoto Athletics Stadium	Roasso Kumamoto	0-2
14	2008.5.18	Gifu Nagaragawa Stadium	Thespa Kusatsu	0-1
16	2008.5.25	Gifu Nagaragawa Stadium	Cerezo Osaka	0-5
17	2008.5.31	Gifu Nagaragawa Stadium	Ventforet Kofu	1-1
18	2008.6.8	Ehime Matsuyama Athletic Stadium	Ehime FC	0-0
19	2008.6.11	Gifu Nagaragawa Stadium	Roasso Kumamoto	0-0
20	2008.6.15	Yokohama Mitsuzawa Football Stadium	Yokohama FC	0-1
21	2008.6.21	Gunma Shikishima Athletic Stadium	Thespa Kusatsu	1-1
22	2008.6.25	Gifu Nagaragawa Stadium	Avispa Fukuoka	0-1
23	2008.6.28	Pocarisweat Stadium	Tokushima Vortis	0-1
24	2008.7.6	Gifu Nagaragawa Stadium	Montedio Yamagata	2-1
26	2008.7.12	Hiroshima Big Arch	Sanfrecce Hiroshima	4-0
27	2008.7.19	Gifu Nagaragawa Stadium	Shonan Bellmare	0-0
28	2008.7.26	Yurtec Stadium Sendai	Vegalta Sendai	1-1
29	2008.8.1	Gifu Nagaragawa Stadium	Mito HollyHock	0-1
30	2008.8.10	Best Amenity Stadium	Sagan Tosu	0-0
31	2008.8.17	Gifu Nagaragawa Stadium	Tokushima Vortis	1-1
32	2008.8.24	Gunma Shikishima Athletic Stadium	Thespa Kusatsu	3-1
33	2008.8.30	Gifu Nagaragawa Stadium	Ehime FC	0-1
34	2008.9.7	Hiroshima Big Arch	Sanfrecce Hiroshima	7-1
35	2008.9.15	Gifu Nagaragawa Stadium	Cerezo Osaka	0-6
36	2008.9.20	Yurtec Stadium Sendai	Vegalta Sendai	1-0
37	2008.9.23	Kose Sports Park Stadium	Ventforet Kofu	4-0
38	2008.9.27	Gifu Nagaragawa Stadium	Avispa Fukuoka	1-1
39	2008.10.5	Kasamatsu Stadium	Mito HollyHock	1-4
40	2008.10.19	Gifu Nagaragawa Stadium	Montedio Yamagata	1-2
41	2008.10.26	Kumamoto Suizenji Stadium	Roasso Kumamoto	1-1
42	2008.11.9	Gifu Nagaragawa Stadium	Yokohama FC	0-1
44	2008.11.30	Hiratsuka Stadium	Shonan Bellmare	3-0
45	2008.12.6	Gifu Nagaragawa Stadium	Sagan Tosu	1-0

=== Emperor's Cup ===
Match	Date	Venue	Opponents	Score
3rd Round	2008.10.12	Toyama Stadium	Zweigen Kanazawa	1-0
4th Round	2008.11.2	Toyota Stadium	Nagoya Grampus	1-0

== Player statistics ==
No.	Pos.	Player	D.o.B. (Age)	Height / Weight	J. League 2		Emperor's Cup		Total	
No.	Pos.	Player	D.o.B. (Age)	Height / Weight	Apps	Goals	Apps	Goals	Apps	Goals
1	GK	Naoto Kono	September 9, 1985 (aged 22)	cm / kg	0	0				
2	DF	Kota Fukatsu	August 10, 1984 (aged 23)	cm / kg	27	0				
3	DF	Kan Kikuchi	May 3, 1977 (aged 30)	cm / kg	28	1				
4	DF	Takayuki Komine	April 25, 1974 (aged 33)	cm / kg	26	0				
5	DF	Shinya Kawashima	July 20, 1978 (aged 29)	cm / kg	38	2				
6	MF	Shinya Nasu	December 29, 1978 (aged 29)	cm / kg	34	0				
7	MF	Ryuji Kitamura	March 15, 1981 (aged 26)	cm / kg	35	0				
8	MF	Yasuhiro Yoshida	July 14, 1969 (aged 38)	cm / kg	0	0				
9	FW	Shinya Aikawa	July 26, 1983 (aged 24)	cm / kg	14	1				
10	FW	Atsushi Katagiri	August 1, 1983 (aged 24)	cm / kg	39	9				
11	MF	Kazumasa Takagi	December 17, 1984 (aged 23)	cm / kg	39	3				
13	FW	Satoshi Ōtomo	October 1, 1981 (aged 26)	cm / kg	18	2				
14	MF	Shōgo Shimada	November 13, 1979 (aged 28)	cm / kg	14	0				
15	FW	Yasuyuki Moriyama	May 1, 1969 (aged 38)	cm / kg	13	1				
16	MF	Lee Song-Ho	April 12, 1983 (aged 24)	cm / kg	0	0				
17	MF	Masamichi Yamada	April 7, 1981 (aged 26)	cm / kg	9	0				
18	FW	Mitsunori Yabuta	May 2, 1976 (aged 31)	cm / kg	15	0				
19	MF	Koji Yoshimura	April 13, 1976 (aged 31)	cm / kg	19	1				
20	MF	Hiromi Kojima	December 12, 1977 (aged 30)	cm / kg	27	2				
21	GK	Suguru Hino	July 29, 1982 (aged 25)	cm / kg	38	0				
22	GK	Nobunari Nishida	March 13, 1986 (aged 21)	cm / kg	0	0				
23	MF	Masahiro Iwata	September 23, 1981 (aged 26)	cm / kg	14	0				
24	FW	Masato Katayama	April 19, 1984 (aged 23)	cm / kg	36	8				
25	FW	Hiromi Kojima	October 27, 1989 (aged 18)	cm / kg	5	0				
26	FW	Yuki Tamura	December 31, 1985 (aged 22)	cm / kg	1	0				
26	FW	Kōichi Satō	November 28, 1986 (aged 21)	cm / kg	1	1				
27	MF	Kazunori Kan	November 11, 1985 (aged 22)	cm / kg	34	4				
28	MF	Satoshi Sato	March 31, 1979 (aged 28)	cm / kg	11	0				
29	FW	Kang Hyo-Il	March 28, 1988 (aged 19)	cm / kg	4	0				
30	MF	Yosuke Kawasaki	January 17, 1990 (aged 18)	cm / kg	0	0				
31	GK	Masatoshi Mizutani	July 7, 1987 (aged 20)	cm / kg	4	0				
32	DF	Ryoma Hashiuchi	April 22, 1989 (aged 18)	cm / kg	2	0				
33	MF	Takashi Umeda	May 30, 1976 (aged 31)	cm / kg	39	5				
34	DF	Yosuke Mori	July 25, 1985 (aged 22)	cm / kg	1	0				

== Other pages ==
- (in Japanese) J. League official site
