= 2006 Emperor's Cup =

Tournament details
- Country: Japan
- Teams: 80

Final positions
- Champions: Urawa Red Diamonds (6th title)
- Runners-up: Gamba Osaka

Tournament statistics
- Matches played: 79

The 86th Emperor's Cup had been held between September 17, 2006, and January 1, 2007. The previous season's winners Urawa Red Diamonds defended the Cup and completed the league-cup double.

== Schedule ==
Round	Date	Fixture	Clubs	Byes/Exemptions
First round	September 17 and 18	20	40→20	39: non-seeded prefectural representative clubs 1: University representative
Second round	September 23 and 24	14	20+8→14	8: seeded prefectural representative clubs
Third round	October 8	14	14+13+1→14	14: J2 clubs (13) and JFL Champions
Fourth round	November 4, 5 and 8	16	14+18→16	18: J1 clubs
Fifth round	December 9 and 16	8	16→8	
Quarterfinals	December 23	4	8→4	
Semifinals	December 29	2	4→2	
Final	January 1, 2007	1	2→1	

== Matches ==
=== First round ===
Match No.	Home team	Score	Away team	Attendance
1	Norbritz Hokkaido	1–2	Nippon Steel Oita	641
2	Matsumoto Yamaga FC	2–2 (a.e.t.)	Doshisha University	1,662
Matsumoto Yamaga FC won 4–3 on penalties.
3	Iwate University	0–3	Kochi University	310
4	SC Tottori	2–1	Sony Sendai	511
5	Teihens FC	0–5	NIFS Kanoya	471
6	Biwako Seikei Sport College	4–1	Fukui University of Technology	478
7	Nirasaki Astros	3–2	Yamagata University	236
8	Tokuyama University	1–4	Ritsumeikan University	168
9	FC Primeiro	0–1	Mitsubishi Mizushima	657
10	FC Central Chugoku	3–0	Ehime FC Youth	553
11	Mie Chukyo University	2–3	Kansai University	753
12	Tokushima Vortis B	0–2	FC Ryukyu	235
13	FC Gifu	5–1	Hiroshima University of Economics	1,229
14	Miyazaki Sangyo-keiei University	3–2 (a.e.t.)	JEF United Ichihara Chiba Reserves	488
15	V-Varen Nagasaki	1–2	Banditonce Kobe	758
16	Tochigi SC	3–0	Saga University	866
17	Kamatamare Sanuki	0–5	Rosso Kumamoto	519
18	Takada FC	0–2	Arte Takasaki	740
19	Hatsushiba Hashimoto High School	0–5	Hachinohe University	287
20	TDK SC	2–0	JAPAN Soccer College	1214

=== Second round ===
Match No.	Home team	Score	Away team	Attendance
21	Nippon Steel Oita	3–1	Matsumoto Yamaga FC	261
22	Kochi University	4–0	SC Tottori	138
23	NIFS Kanoya	0–3	Biwako Seikei Sport College	223
24	Nirasaki Astros	1–3 (a.e.t.)	Ritsumeikan University	78
25	Mitusbishi Mizushima FC	2–0	FC Central Chugoku	723
26	Kansai University	0–0 (a.e.t.)	FC Ryukyu	359
Kansai University won 6–5 on penalties.
27	Kanagawa University	0–1	FC Gifu	794
28	Fukuoka University	0–2	Miyazaki Sangyo-keiei University	303
29	Aichi Gakuin University	1–8	Banditonce Kobe	356
30	Shobi University	0–2	Tochigi SC	575
31	Ryutsu Keizai University FC	0–2	Rosso Kumamoto	348
32	Shizuoka FC	2–1	Arte Takasaki	251
33	YKK AP FC	1–0 (a.e.t.)	Hachinohe University	1,125
34	Hosei University	2–0	TDK SC	449

=== Third round ===
The third round matches were held on October 8, 2006.

Match No.	Home team	Score	Away team	Attendance
35	Consadole Sapporo	3–1 (a.e.t.)	Nippon Steel Oita	2,353
36	Honda FC	1–0	Kochi University	605
37	Ehime FC	2–0	Biwako Seikei Sport College	1,504
38	Sagan Tosu	4–3	Ritsumeikan University	1,679
39	Montedio Yamagata	6–2	Mitsubishi Mizushima	1,804
40	Shonan Bellmare	4–1	Kansai University	1,167
41	Thespa Kusatsu	3–0	FC Gifu	2,650
42	Tokushima Vortis	4–1	Miyazaki Sangyo-keiei University	831
43	Yokohama FC	0–1	Banditonce Kobe	2,011
44	Tokyo Verdy 1969	0–1	Tochigi SC	3,023
45	Vegalta Sendai	1–0	Rosso Kumamoto	6,007
46	Mito HollyHock	0–1	Shizuoka FC	1,016
47	Vissel Kobe	2–4	YKK AP FC	3,551
48	Kashiwa Reysol	3–0	Hosei University	2,752

=== Fourth round ===
2006-11-04
13:00

Urawa Red Diamonds	5–0	Shizuoka FC
Tanaka 4', 57'; Hasebe 22'; Washington 46', 89'	Report (in Japanese)

Urawa Komaba Stadium, Saitama
Attendance: 13,636
Referee: Akio Okutani

2006-11-04
13:00

Avispa Fukuoka	1 – 1 (a.e.t.)	Kyoto Purple Sanga
Roberto 98'	Report (in Japanese)	Paulinho 111'
Penalties
	4–2

Hakata no mori stadium, Fukuoka
Attendance: 1,606
Referee: Toshimitsu Yoshida

2006-11-05
13:00

Omiya Ardija	2–1	YKK AP FC
Hashimoto 41'; Wakabayashi 81'	Report (in Japanese)	Kishida 61'

Yabase Athletic Stadium, Akita
Attendance: 2,074
Referee: Masayoshi Okada

2006-11-04
13:00

Júbilo Iwata	1 – 1 (a.e.t.)	Kashiwa Reysol
Maeda 9'	Report (in Japanese)	Doumbia Seydou 56'
Penalties
	9–8

Yamaha Stadium, Iwata
Attendance: 5,557
Referee: Kenji Ogiya

2006-11-08
13:00

Kashima Antlers	4–0	Honda FC
Own goal 12'; Fukai 15'; Tashiro 19'; Iwamasa 60'	Report (in Japanese)

Kashima Soccer Stadium, Kashima
Attendance: 1,824
Referee: Minoru Tojo

2006-11-05
13:00

Nagoya Grampus Eight	1–0	Vegalta Sendai
Johnsen 32'	Report (in Japanese)

Mizuho Athletic Stadium, Nagoya
Attendance: 3,906
Referee: Hirofumi Yamanishi

2006-11-05
13:00

Shimizu S-Pulse	6–4	Tochigi SC
Yajima 59', 73'; Fujimoto 68', 84'; Marquinhos 72', 88'	Report (in Japanese)	Tadaki 75'; Yoshida 80'; Kayashima 87'; Nagai 89'

Nihondaira Sports Stadium, Shizuoka
Attendance: 5,261
Referee: Kazuhisa Osada

2006-11-05
13:00

FC Tokyo	7–0	Banditonce Kobe
Masujima 17'; Lucas 33', 85'; Baba 43', 50'; Suzuki 62', 70'	Report (in Japanese)

Ajinomoto Stadium, Chōfu
Attendance: 6,397
Referee: Hiroyoshi Takayama

2006-11-04
13:00

Gamba Osaka	2–1	Shonan Bellmare
Futagawa 44'; Ienaga 79'	Report (in Japanese)	Ishihara 32'

Osaka Expo '70 Stadium, Suita
Attendance: 3,454
Referee: Shinji Murakami

2006-11-04
13:00

Sanfrecce Hiroshima	3–0	Cerezo Osaka
Komano 62'; Sato 63'; Aoyama 87'	Report (in Japanese)

Bird Stadium, Tottori
Attendance: 4,286
Referee: Yoshitsugu Katayama

2006-11-05
13:00

Oita Trinita	4–1	Thespa Kusatsu
Takahashi 9', 44', 58'; Miki 18'	Report (in Japanese)	Saito 67'

Kyushu Oil Dome, Ōita
Attendance: 5,515
Referee: Joji Kashihara

2006-11-05
13:00

Yokohama F. Marinos	1 – 0 (a.e.t.)	Ehime FC
Marques 104'	Report (in Japanese)

Mitsuzawa Stadium, Yokohama
Attendance: 5,791
Referee: Keiichi Sunagawa

2006-11-04
13:00

Kawasaki Frontale	3–0	Sagan Tosu
Nakamura 77'; Chong 80'; Juninho 89'	Report (in Japanese)

Todoroki Athletics Stadium, Kawasaki
Attendance: 5,026
Referee: Hajime Matsuo

2006-11-05
13:00

Ventforet Kofu	3–2	Montedio Yamagata
Biju 40'; Sudo 63', 83'	Report (in Japanese)	Miyazawa 21'; Leandro 55'

Kose Sports Stadium, Kōfu
Attendance: 4,344
Referee: Tsutomu Anazawa

2006-11-08
19:00

JEF United Ichihara Chiba	0–1	Consadole Sapporo
	Report (in Japanese)	Aikawa 66'

Fukuda Denshi Arena, Chiba
Attendance: 4,389
Referee: Kenji Ogiya

2006-11-04
13:00

Albirex Niigata	2–0	Tokushima Vortis
Mita 46'; Fabinho 89'	Report (in Japanese)

Niigata Stadium, Niigata
Attendance: 12,724
Referee: Kazuhiko Matsumura

=== Fifth round ===
2006-12-16
13:00

Urawa Red Diamonds	3 – 0 (a.e.t.)	Avispa Fukuoka
Ponte 93'; Washington 108'; Nagai 119'	Report (in Japanese)

Saitama Stadium, Saitama
Attendance: 17,675
Referee: Keiichi Sunagawa

2006-12-09
13:00

Omiya Ardija	0–1	Júbilo Iwata
	Report (in Japanese)	Nishi 56'

Yamaha Stadium, Iwata
Attendance: 4,328
Referee: Takuya Maeda

2006-12-09
13:00

Kashima Antlers	2–1	Nagoya Grampus Eight
Alex Mineiro 11'; Chugo 25'	Report (in Japanese)	Johnsen 12'

Kashima Soccer Stadium, Kashima
Attendance: 5,627
Referee: Hajime Matsuo

2006-12-09
13:00

Shimizu S-Pulse	3 – 2 (a.e.t.)	FC Tokyo
Takaki 5'; Fujimoto 89'; Cho 111'	Report (in Japanese)	Masujima 8'; Kajiyama 38'

Momotaro Stadium, Okayama
Attendance: 3,955
Referee: Tsutomu Anazawa

2006-12-09
13:00

Gamba Osaka	4 – 2 (a.e.t.)	Sanfrecce Hiroshima
Endo 69'; Magno Alves 77', 112'; Terada 110'	Report (in Japanese)	Sato 64'; Kōji Morisaki 89'

Kobe Universiade Memorial Stadium, Kobe
Attendance: 3,625
Referee: Akio Okutani

2006-12-09
13:00

Oita Trinita	1 – 1 (a.e.t.)	Yokohama F. Marinos
Takahashi 64'	Report (in Japanese)	Sakata 15'
Penalties
Túlio (penalty missed); Rafael (penalty scored); Nemoto (penalty scored); Matsuhashi (penalty missed)	2–4	(penalty scored) Yamase; (penalty scored) Kubo; (penalty scored) Marques; (penalty missed) Kano; (penalty scored) Kawai

Nagasaki Sports Park Stadium, Isahaya
Attendance: 8,056
Referee: Hirofumi Yamanishi

2006-12-09
13:00

Kawasaki Frontale	2–5	Ventforet Kofu
Juninho 6'; Chong 78'	Report (in Japanese)	Josimar 29', 67'; Fujita 35'; Kuranuki 63'; Sudo 84'

Marugame Stadium, Marugame
Attendance: 3,881
Referee: Shinji Murakami

2006-12-09
13:00

Consadole Sapporo	2 – 2 (a.e.t.)	Albirex Niigata
Sunagawa 34', 51'	Report (in Japanese)	Edmilson 13'; Yano 83'
Penalties
Sunagawa (penalty scored); Soda (penalty scored); Otsuka (penalty scored); Nakayama (penalty scored); Haga (penalty scored); Aikawa (penalty scored); Wanami (penalty scored); Nishijima (penalty scored)	8–7	(penalty scored) Edmilson; (penalty scored) Fabinho; (penalty scored) Matsushita; (penalty scored) Kawahara; (penalty scored) Uchida; (penalty scored) Chiba; (penalty scored) Terakawa; (penalty missed) Yano

Fukuda Denshi Arena, Chiba
Attendance: 5,235
Referee: Minoru Tojo

=== Quarterfinals ===
2006-12-23
13:00

Urawa Red Diamonds	3 – 3 (a.e.t.)	Júbilo Iwata
Nagai 54'; Ono 63', 80'	Report (in Japanese)	Maeda 31'; Fukunishi 46'; Inuzuka 81'
Penalties
Ono (penalty scored); Yamada (penalty scored); Ponte (penalty scored); Sakai (penalty scored); Hasebe (penalty scored); Tsuzuki (penalty scored); Uchidate (penalty scored); Suzuki (penalty scored); Tsuboi (penalty scored); Hosogai (penalty scored)	10–9	(penalty scored) Maeda; (penalty scored) Ota; (penalty scored) Kim; (penalty scored) Ueda; (penalty scored) Fabrício; (penalty scored) Funatani; (penalty scored) Cullen; (penalty scored) Kikuchi; (penalty scored) Oi; (penalty missed) Inuzuka

Saitama Stadium, Saitama
Attendance: 27,242
Referee: Masayoshi Okada

2006-12-23
15:00

Kashima Antlers	3–2	Shimizu S-Pulse
Tashiro 54'; Motoyama 79'; Yanagisawa 88'	Report (in Japanese)	Yajima 10', 50'

KKWing Stadium, Kumamoto
Attendance: 5,737
Referee: Joji Kashihara

2006-12-23
15:00

Gamba Osaka	3–1	Yokohama F. Marinos
Bando 8'; Ienaga 69'; Magno Alves 76'	Report (in Japanese)	Sakata 2'

Kobe Universiade Memorial Stadium, Kobe
Attendance: 9,044
Referee: Yoshitsugu Katayama

2006-12-23
13:00

Ventforet Kofu	0–2	Consadole Sapporo
	Report (in Japanese)	Own goal 1'; Kaga 73'

Yurtec Stadium Sendai, Sendai
Attendance: 5,537
Referee: Toshimitsu Yoshida

=== Semifinals ===
2006-12-29
15:00

Urawa Red Diamonds	2–1	Kashima Antlers
Ono 40'; Ponte 82'	Report (in Japanese)	Iwamasa 69'

National Stadium, Tokyo
Attendance: 35,782
Referee: Toru Kamikawa

2006-12-29
13:00

Gamba Osaka	2–1	Consadole Sapporo
Kaji 17'; Maeda 52'	Report (in Japanese)	Aikawa 54'

Shizuoka Stadium, Fukuroi
Attendance: 7,038
Referee: Kazuhiko Matsumura

=== Final ===
2007-01-01
14:00

Urawa Red Diamonds	1–0	Gamba Osaka
Nagai 87'	Report (in Japanese)

National Stadium, Tokyo
Attendance: 46,880
Referee: Yuichi Nishimura
