= Hideyoshi Akita =

Japanese footballer

Hideyoshi Akita 秋田 英義
Personal information
- Full name: Hideyoshi Akita
- Date of birth: July 23, 1974 (age 52)
- Place of birth: Kyoto, Japan
- Height: 1.78 m (5 ft 10 in)
- Position: Defender

Youth career
- 1990–1992: Sakuyo High School

Senior career*
| Years | Team | Apps | (Gls) |
| 1993–1994 | Nagoya Grampus Eight | 1 | (0) |
| 1995–1997 | Blaze Kumamoto | | |
| 1998–2006 | Nagoya SC | | |
| 2006–2007 | FC Kariya | 25 | (8) |
| 2007–2008 | Gainare Tottori | 43 | (7) |
| 2009–2011 | FC Gifu | 105 | (2) |
| 2013 | Nagoya SC | 13 | (8) |
| Total | | 187 | (25) |
- * Club domestic league appearances and goals

Hideyoshi Akita (秋田 英義, Akita Hideyoshi; born July 23, 1974) is a former Japanese football player.

== Playing career ==
Akita was born in Kyoto Prefecture on July 23, 1974. Although he was a defender, he played also as midfielder and forward. After graduating from high school, he joined Nagoya Grampus Eight in 1993. On November 16, 1994, he debuted against JEF United Ichihara. However he only played in this one match for the club. In 1995, he moved to Regional Leagues club Blaze Kumamoto. In 1998, he moved to Regional Leagues club Nagoya SC. In October 2006, he moved to Japan Football League (JFL) club FC Kariya. In July 2007, he moved to JFL club Gainare Tottori and he played as a regular player. In 2009, he moved to J2 League club FC Gifu. He played in the J.League for the first time in 15 years. He played as a regular player in three seasons and retired at the end of the 2011 season. In 2013, he came back as a player in the Regional Leagues club Nagoya SC and played in one season.

== Career statistics ==
Appearances and goals by club, season and competition
| Club | Season | League | | | Emperor's Cup | | J.League Cup | | Total | |
| Club | Season | Division | Apps | Goals | Apps | Goals | Apps | Goals | Apps | Goals |
|---|---|---|---|---|---|---|---|---|---|---|
| Nagoya Grampus Eight | 1993 | J1 League | 0 | 0 | 0 | 0 | 0 | 0 | 0 | 0 |
| Nagoya Grampus Eight | 1994 | J1 League | 1 | 0 | 0 | 0 | 0 | 0 | 1 | 0 |
| Blaze Kumamoto | 1995 | Regional Leagues | | | - | | - | | | |
| Blaze Kumamoto | 1996 | Regional Leagues | | | - | | - | | | |
| Blaze Kumamoto | 1997 | Regional Leagues | | | - | | - | | | |
| Nagoya SC | 1998 | Regional Leagues | | | - | | - | | | |
| Nagoya SC | 1999 | Regional Leagues | | | 1 | 0 | - | | 1 | 0 |
| Nagoya SC | 2000 | Regional Leagues | | | - | | - | | | |
| Nagoya SC | 2001 | Regional Leagues | | | - | | - | | | |
| Nagoya SC | 2002 | Regional Leagues | | | - | | - | | | |
| Nagoya SC | 2003 | Regional Leagues | | | - | | - | | | |
| Nagoya SC | 2004 | Regional Leagues | | | - | | - | | | |
| Nagoya SC | 2005 | Regional Leagues | | | - | | - | | | |
| Nagoya SC | 2006 | Regional Leagues | | | - | | - | | | |
| FC Kariya | 2006 | Football League | 9 | 1 | - | | - | | 9 | 1 |
| FC Kariya | 2007 | Football League | 16 | 7 | - | | - | | 16 | 7 |
| Gainare Tottori | 2007 | Football League | 14 | 4 | 2 | 1 | - | | 16 | 5 |
| Gainare Tottori | 2008 | Football League | 29 | 3 | 0 | 0 | - | | 29 | 3 |
| FC Gifu | 2009 | J2 League | 47 | 2 | 3 | 0 | - | | 50 | 2 |
| FC Gifu | 2010 | J2 League | 35 | 0 | 1 | 0 | - | | 36 | 0 |
| FC Gifu | 2011 | J2 League | 23 | 0 | 1 | 0 | - | | 24 | 0 |
| Nagoya SC | 2011 | Regional Leagues | 13 | 8 | - | | - | | 13 | 8 |
| Career total | | | 187 | 25 | 8 | 1 | 0 | 0 | 195 | 26 |
