= Shinya Kawashima =

Japanese footballer

Shinya Kawashima 川島 眞也
Personal information
- Full name: Shinya Kawashima
- Date of birth: July 22, 1978 (age 48)
- Place of birth: Shizuoka, Japan
- Height: 1.88 m (6 ft 2 in)
- Position: Defender

Youth career
- 1994–1996: Shimizu Commercial High School

Senior career*
Years	Team	Apps	(Gls)
1997–2002	Sanfrecce Hiroshima	42	(1)
2001	→Urawa Reds (loan)	0	(0)
2002–2007	Avispa Fukuoka	128	(6)
2008–2012	FC Gifu	77	(3)
Total		247	(10)
Medal record
Sanfrecce Hiroshima
Runner-up	Emperor's Cup	1999
- * Club domestic league appearances and goals

Shinya Kawashima (川島 眞也, Kawashima Shinya; born July 20, 1978) is a former Japanese football player.

== Playing career ==
Kawashima was born in Shizuoka on July 20, 1978. After graduating from Shimizu Commercial High School, he joined the J1 League club Sanfrecce Hiroshima in 1997. He debuted as a center back in 1998 and played many matches as a substitute in 2000. However he did not play much in 2001. In July 2001, he moved to the Urawa Reds. However, he did not play at all there. In 2002, he returned to Sanfrecce Hiroshima. Although he was a regular player in early 2002, he did not play at all in July. In September 2002, he moved to the J2 League club Avispa Fukuoka. He played as a regular player until 2003. However, his playing time gradually decreased in 2004. Although he played often in 2007, he moved to the newly promoted J2 League club, FC Gifu. He played as a regular player in 2008. However his playing time gradually decreased in 2009 and he did not play at all in 2012. He retired at the end of the 2012 season.

== Career statistics ==
Appearances and goals by club, season and competition
Club	Season	League			Emperor's Cup		J.League Cup		Total	
Club	Season	Division	Apps	Goals	Apps	Goals	Apps	Goals	Apps	Goals
Sanfrecce Hiroshima	1997	J1 League	0	0	0	0	0	0	0	0
Sanfrecce Hiroshima	1998	J1 League	3	0	0	0	2	1	5	1
Sanfrecce Hiroshima	1999	J1 League	4	0	5	1	2	0	11	1
Sanfrecce Hiroshima	2000	J1 League	23	1	2	0	3	0	28	1
Sanfrecce Hiroshima	2001	J1 League	4	0	0	0	1	0	5	0
Urawa Reds	2001	J1 League	0	0	0	0	0	0	0	0
Sanfrecce Hiroshima	2002	J1 League	8	0	0	0	6	0	14	0
Avispa Fukuoka	2002	J2 League	14	0	4	1	—		18	1
Avispa Fukuoka	2003	J2 League	39	3	3	1	—		42	4
Avispa Fukuoka	2004	J2 League	12	0	1	0	—		13	0
Avispa Fukuoka	2005	J2 League	18	1	2	0	—		20	1
Avispa Fukuoka	2006	J1 League	12	0	0	0	4	0	16	0
Avispa Fukuoka	2007	J2 League	33	2	1	0	—		34	2
FC Gifu	2008	J2 League	38	2	2	0	—		40	2
FC Gifu	2009	J2 League	8	0	0	0	—		8	0
FC Gifu	2010	J2 League	17	0	0	0	—		17	0
FC Gifu	2011	J2 League	14	1	0	0	—		14	1
FC Gifu	2012	J2 League	0	0	0	0	—		0	0
Career total			247	10	20	3	18	1	285	14
