= Hideyoshi (given name) =

- Gender: Male
- Language: Japanese

Origin
- Origin: Japan
- Meaning: Different meanings depending on the kanji used

Hideyoshi is a masculine Japanese given name.

== Written forms ==
Hideyoshi can be written using different combinations of kanji characters. Here are some examples:

- 秀吉

-秀(Shu/Hii):excel, excellence, beauty, surpass
-吉(Kichi/Yōshi):good luck, joy, congratulations

- 秀義

-秀(Shu/Hii):excel, excellence, beauty, surpass
-義(Gī/Yōshi):righteousness, justice, morality, honor, loyalty

- 英義

-英(Ei):England, hero, flower
-義(Gī/Yōshi):righteousness, justice, morality, honor, loyalty

- 英良

-英(Ei):England, hero, flower
-良(Ryō): Good

The name can also be written in hiragana ひでよし.

== Notable people with the name ==
- Hideyoshi Akita (秋田 英義) (born 1974), a Japanese football player.
- Hideyoshi Enrique Arakaki Chinen (born 1998) is a Peruvian footballer
- Hideyoshi Obata (小畑 英良) (1890–1944), Japanese general
- Sasaki Hideyoshi (佐々木 秀義) (1112–1184), Japanese samurai and daimyō
- Toyotomi Hideyoshi (豊臣 秀吉) (1536/1537–1598), Japanese samurai and daimyō

== Fictional characters ==
- Hideyoshi, a character in Pokémon Conquest
- Kenji Hideyoshi, main character in The Tattoo, a novel by Chris McKinney
- Kinoshita Hideyoshi (木下 秀吉), a character in Baka and Test
- Nagachika Hideyoshi, a character in Tokyo Ghoul
