= Shinya Nasu =

Japanese footballer

Shinya Nasu 奈須 伸也
Personal information
- Full name: Shinya Nasu
- Date of birth: December 29, 1978 (age 47)
- Place of birth: Osaka, Japan
- Height: 1.81 m (5 ft 11 1/2 in)
- Position: Midfielder

Youth career
- 1994–1996: Daisho Gakuen High School

Senior career*
Years	Team	Apps	(Gls)
1997–1998	Sagawa Express Osaka		
2002–2007	Ventforet Kofu	107	(6)
2008	FC Gifu	38	(0)
Total		145	(6)
- * Club domestic league appearances and goals

Shinya Nasu (奈須 伸也, Nasu Shinya; born December 29, 1978) is a former Japanese football player.

== Playing career ==
Nasu was born in Osaka on December 29, 1978. After graduating from high school, he joined Regional Leagues club Sagawa Express Osaka in 1997. He played for the club in 2 seasons. In 2002, he joined J2 League club Ventforet Kofu. Although his original position is defensive midfielder, he became a regular as left side back. Although he could not play many matches in 2004, he became a regular as defensive midfielder in 2005 and Ventforet was promoted to J1 League end of 2005 season. However he could hardly play in the match from 2006. In 2008, he moved to newly was promoted to J2 League club, FC Gifu. He played many matches as regular left side back. He retired end of 2008 season.

== Club statistics ==
Club performance			League		Cup		League Cup		Total	
Season	Club	League	Apps	Goals	Apps	Goals	Apps	Goals	Apps	Goals
Japan			League		Emperor's Cup		J.League Cup		Total	
2002	Ventforet Kofu	J2 League	28	4	3	0	-		31	4
2003	Ventforet Kofu	J2 League	37	1	0	0	-		37	1
2004	Ventforet Kofu	J2 League	11	0	1	0	-		12	0
2005	Ventforet Kofu	J2 League	31	1	1	0	-		32	1
2006	Ventforet Kofu	J1 League	4	0	1	0	4	0	9	0
2007	Ventforet Kofu	J1 League	0	0	0	0	0	0	0	0
2008	FC Gifu	J2 League	34	0	2	0	-		36	0
Total			145	6	8	0	4	0	157	6
