= Shinya Aikawa =

Japanese footballer

Shinya Aikawa 相川 進也
Personal information
- Full name: Shinya Aikawa
- Date of birth: July 26, 1983 (age 43)
- Place of birth: Kamisato, Saitama, Japan
- Height: 1.79 m (5 ft 10 1/2 in)
- Position: Forward

Youth career
- 1999–2001: Maebashi Ikei High School

Senior career*
Years	Team	Apps	(Gls)
2002–2007	Consadole Sapporo	133	(28)
2007–2008	FC Gifu	22	(5)
Total		155	(33)
- * Club domestic league appearances and goals

Shinya Aikawa (相川 進也, Aikawa Shinya; born July 26, 1983) is a former Japanese football player.

== Playing career ==
Aikawa was born in Kamisato, Saitama on July 26, 1983. After graduating from high school, he joined the J1 League club Consadole Sapporo in 2002. On May 6, he debuted against Vegalta Sendai in the J.League Cup. He first played in the J1 League in November and played the last four matches in the 2002 season. However Consadole finished in last place and was relegated to the J2 League at the end of the 2002 season. He became a regular forward under the new manager Masaaki Yanagishita in 2004 and played often until 2006. However Yanagishita resigned at the end of the 2006 season, and Aikawa did not play as much under the new manager Toshiya Miura in 2007. In September 2007, he moved to the Japan Football League club FC Gifu. He scored 4 goals in 8 matches and Gifu was promoted to J2 at the end of the 2007 season. However he did not play much in 2008 and retired at the end of the 2008 season.

== Career statistics ==
Appearances and goals by club, season and competition
Club	Season	League			Emperor's Cup		J.League Cup		Total	
Club	Season	Division	Apps	Goals	Apps	Goals	Apps	Goals	Apps	Goals
Consadole Sapporo	2002	J1 League	4	2	0	0	1	0	5	2
Consadole Sapporo	2003	J2 League	11	0	2	1	-		13	1
Consadole Sapporo	2004	J2 League	40	7	3	1	-		43	8
Consadole Sapporo	2005	J2 League	34	9	1	0	-		35	9
Consadole Sapporo	2006	J2 League	35	9	4	4	-		39	13
Consadole Sapporo	2007	J2 League	9	1	0	0	-		9	1
FC Gifu	2007	Football League	8	4	0	0	-		8	4
FC Gifu	2008	J2 League	14	1	2	1	-		16	2
Career total			155	33	12	7	1	0	168	40
