= 2008 Japanese Regional Leagues =

Japanese amateur leagues football season

Japanese Regional Leagues
- Season: 2008
- Promoted: Machida Zelvia; V-Varen Nagasaki; Honda Lock S.C.

Statistics of Japanese Regional Leagues for the 2008 season.

== Champions list ==
| Region | Champions |
|---|---|
| Hokkaido | Norbritz Hokkaido |
| Tohoku | Grulla Morioka |
| Kantō | Machida Zelvia |
| Hokushin'etsu | Nagano Parceiro |
| Tōkai | Shizuoka |
| Kansai | Banditonce Kakogawa |
| Chūgoku | Renofa Yamaguchi |
| Shikoku | Kamatamare Sanuki |
| Kyushu | Okinawa Kariyushi |

== League standings ==
=== Hokkaido ===
| Pos | Team | Pld | W | D | L | GF | GA | GD | Pts |
|---|---|---|---|---|---|---|---|---|---|
| 1 | Norbritz Hokkaido | 14 | 9 | 4 | 1 | 54 | 19 | +35 | 31 |
| 2 | Sapporo Shūkyūdan | 14 | 10 | 1 | 3 | 45 | 16 | +29 | 31 |
| 3 | Barefoot Hokkaidō | 14 | 7 | 5 | 2 | 36 | 21 | +15 | 26 |
| 4 | Toyota Motors Hokkaidō | 14 | 7 | 3 | 4 | 30 | 26 | +4 | 24 |
| 5 | Sapporo Wins | 14 | 6 | 0 | 8 | 41 | 35 | +6 | 18 |
| 6 | R. Superb Kushiro | 14 | 4 | 3 | 7 | 24 | 26 | −2 | 15 |
| 7 | Blackpecker Hakodate | 14 | 3 | 2 | 9 | 29 | 51 | −22 | 11 |
| 8 | SSS Sheffield | 14 | 1 | 0 | 13 | 9 | 74 | −65 | 3 |

=== Tohoku ===
Division 1
| Pos | Team | Pld | W | D | L | GF | GA | GD | Pts |
|---|---|---|---|---|---|---|---|---|---|
| 1 | Grulla Morioka | 14 | 12 | 2 | 0 | 63 | 8 | +55 | 38 |
| 2 | NEC Tokin | 14 | 12 | 1 | 1 | 59 | 6 | +53 | 37 |
| 3 | Primeiro | 14 | 8 | 0 | 6 | 35 | 32 | +3 | 24 |
| 4 | Akita Cambiare | 14 | 7 | 2 | 5 | 18 | 24 | −6 | 23 |
| 5 | Shiogama Wiese | 14 | 4 | 1 | 9 | 24 | 49 | −25 | 13 |
| 6 | Sendai Nakada | 14 | 4 | 0 | 10 | 17 | 38 | −21 | 12 |
| 7 | Viancone Fukushima | 14 | 3 | 0 | 11 | 17 | 39 | −22 | 9 |
| 8 | Furukawa Battery | 14 | 3 | 0 | 11 | 11 | 48 | −37 | 9 |

Division 2 North
| Pos | Team | Pld | W | D | L | GF | GA | GD | Pts |
|---|---|---|---|---|---|---|---|---|---|
| 1 | Morioka Zebra | 14 | 10 | 2 | 2 | 40 | 15 | +25 | 32 |
| 2 | Mizusawa Club | 14 | 9 | 2 | 3 | 29 | 15 | +14 | 29 |
| 3 | Nippon Steel Kamaishi | 14 | 8 | 3 | 3 | 29 | 17 | +12 | 27 |
| 4 | Vanraure Hachinohe | 14 | 7 | 2 | 5 | 31 | 26 | +5 | 23 |
| 5 | Fuji Club | 14 | 6 | 1 | 7 | 22 | 21 | +1 | 19 |
| 6 | Tōno Club | 14 | 5 | 2 | 7 | 30 | 28 | +2 | 17 |
| 7 | Saruta Kōgyō S.C. [tl] | 14 | 2 | 3 | 9 | 15 | 25 | −10 | 9 |
| 8 | Shiwa | 14 | 1 | 1 | 12 | 12 | 61 | −49 | 4 |

Division 2 South
| Pos | Team | Pld | W | D | L | GF | GA | GD | Pts |
|---|---|---|---|---|---|---|---|---|---|
| 1 | Fukushima United | 14 | 14 | 0 | 0 | 76 | 8 | +68 | 42 |
| 2 | Cobaltore Onagawa | 14 | 11 | 0 | 3 | 53 | 9 | +44 | 33 |
| 3 | Sōma | 14 | 6 | 3 | 5 | 30 | 25 | +5 | 21 |
| 4 | Bandits Iwaki | 14 | 6 | 2 | 6 | 27 | 34 | −7 | 20 |
| 5 | Nakaniida | 14 | 6 | 1 | 7 | 27 | 30 | −3 | 19 |
| 6 | Marysol Matsushima | 14 | 5 | 1 | 8 | 35 | 39 | −4 | 16 |
| 7 | Shichigahama | 14 | 3 | 3 | 8 | 26 | 50 | −24 | 12 |
| 8 | Kureha | 14 | 0 | 0 | 14 | 5 | 84 | −79 | 0 |

=== Kantō ===
Division 1
| Pos | Team | Pld | W | D | L | GF | GA | GD | Pts |
|---|---|---|---|---|---|---|---|---|---|
| 1 | Machida Zelvia | 14 | 12 | 2 | 0 | 58 | 11 | +47 | 38 |
| 2 | Hitachi Tochigi Uva | 14 | 8 | 2 | 4 | 24 | 19 | +5 | 26 |
| 3 | Yokohama Sports and Culture Club | 14 | 6 | 5 | 3 | 21 | 22 | −1 | 23 |
| 4 | Club Dragons | 14 | 5 | 3 | 6 | 33 | 27 | +6 | 18 |
| 5 | Saitama | 14 | 4 | 4 | 6 | 20 | 22 | −2 | 16 |
| 6 | Honda Luminozo Sayama | 14 | 5 | 0 | 9 | 17 | 30 | −13 | 15 |
| 7 | Maritime Self Defence Forces Atsugi Base Marcus | 14 | 2 | 5 | 7 | 12 | 27 | −15 | 11 |
| 8 | Toho Titanium | 14 | 2 | 3 | 9 | 8 | 35 | −27 | 9 |

Division 2
| Pos | Team | Pld | W | D | L | GF | GA | GD | Pts |
|---|---|---|---|---|---|---|---|---|---|
| 1 | Hanno Bruder | 14 | 10 | 3 | 1 | 20 | 14 | +6 | 33 |
| 2 | Korea | 14 | 10 | 0 | 4 | 40 | 25 | +15 | 30 |
| 3 | Vertfee Takahara Nasu | 14 | 8 | 1 | 5 | 26 | 15 | +11 | 25 |
| 4 | Aries Tōkyō | 14 | 7 | 2 | 5 | 25 | 25 | 0 | 23 |
| 5 | Kanagawa Teachers | 14 | 4 | 2 | 8 | 25 | 31 | −6 | 14 |
| 6 | S.A.I. Ichihara | 14 | 4 | 1 | 9 | 21 | 28 | −7 | 13 |
| 7 | Yono Shūkonkai | 14 | 4 | 1 | 9 | 20 | 43 | −23 | 13 |
| 8 | TFSC | 14 | 3 | 2 | 9 | 23 | 23 | 0 | 11 |

=== Hokushin'etsu ===
Division 1
| Pos | Team | Pld | W | D | L | GF | GA | GD | Pts |
|---|---|---|---|---|---|---|---|---|---|
| 1 | Nagano Parceiro | 14 | 11 | 2 | 1 | 55 | 11 | +44 | 35 |
| 2 | Japan Soccer College | 14 | 10 | 1 | 3 | 46 | 18 | +28 | 31 |
| 3 | Zweigen Kanazawa | 14 | 10 | 0 | 4 | 50 | 15 | +35 | 30 |
| 4 | Matsumoto Yamaga | 14 | 7 | 3 | 4 | 31 | 18 | +13 | 24 |
| 5 | Granscena Niigata | 14 | 5 | 2 | 7 | 28 | 46 | −18 | 17 |
| 6 | Valiente Toyama | 14 | 3 | 1 | 10 | 20 | 47 | −27 | 10 |
| 7 | Saurcos Fukui | 14 | 2 | 3 | 9 | 18 | 41 | −23 | 9 |
| 8 | Fervorosa Ishikawa Hakuzan | 14 | 2 | 0 | 12 | 9 | 61 | −52 | 6 |

Division 2
| Pos | Team | Pld | W | D | L | GF | GA | GD | Pts |
|---|---|---|---|---|---|---|---|---|---|
| 1 | Ueda Gentian | 14 | 11 | 1 | 2 | 48 | 21 | +27 | 34 |
| 2 | Cups Niigata | 14 | 8 | 2 | 4 | 30 | 15 | +15 | 26 |
| 3 | Niigata University of Health and Welfare | 14 | 7 | 3 | 4 | 34 | 21 | +13 | 24 |
| 4 | Antelope Shiojiri | 14 | 7 | 3 | 4 | 24 | 21 | +3 | 24 |
| 5 | Niigata University of Management | 14 | 6 | 1 | 7 | 21 | 28 | −7 | 19 |
| 6 | Ohara JaSRA | 14 | 3 | 4 | 7 | 20 | 31 | −11 | 13 |
| 7 | Maruoka Phoenix | 14 | 4 | 1 | 9 | 21 | 39 | −18 | 13 |
| 8 | Nissei Plastic Industrial | 14 | 1 | 3 | 10 | 17 | 39 | −22 | 6 |

=== Tōkai ===
Division 1
| Pos | Team | Pld | W | D | L | GF | GA | GD | Pts |
|---|---|---|---|---|---|---|---|---|---|
| 1 | Shizuoka | 14 | 10 | 4 | 0 | 45 | 12 | +33 | 34 |
| 2 | Yazaki Valente | 14 | 9 | 2 | 3 | 35 | 10 | +25 | 29 |
| 3 | Fujieda City Government | 14 | 8 | 3 | 3 | 31 | 21 | +10 | 27 |
| 4 | Chukyo University | 14 | 6 | 2 | 6 | 28 | 21 | +7 | 20 |
| 5 | Konica Minolta Toyokawa | 14 | 5 | 1 | 8 | 20 | 35 | −15 | 16 |
| 6 | Maruyasu | 14 | 4 | 3 | 7 | 15 | 24 | −9 | 15 |
| 7 | Mind House Yokkaichi | 14 | 3 | 1 | 10 | 17 | 41 | −24 | 10 |
| 8 | Sagawa Express Chukyo | 14 | 3 | 0 | 11 | 10 | 37 | −27 | 9 |

Division 2
| Pos | Team | Pld | W | D | L | GF | GA | GD | Pts |
|---|---|---|---|---|---|---|---|---|---|
| 1 | Hamamatsu University | 14 | 8 | 3 | 3 | 41 | 18 | +23 | 27 |
| 2 | Toyota | 14 | 8 | 2 | 4 | 30 | 20 | +10 | 26 |
| 3 | M.I.E Rampole | 14 | 7 | 4 | 3 | 21 | 13 | +8 | 25 |
| 4 | Kasugai Club | 14 | 7 | 4 | 3 | 19 | 15 | +4 | 25 |
| 5 | Nagoya | 14 | 5 | 4 | 5 | 16 | 26 | −10 | 19 |
| 6 | Fuyo Club | 14 | 4 | 6 | 4 | 23 | 26 | −3 | 18 |
| 7 | KMEW Iga | 14 | 1 | 4 | 9 | 15 | 34 | −19 | 7 |
| 8 | Honda Suzuka | 14 | 1 | 3 | 10 | 17 | 30 | −13 | 6 |

=== Kansai ===
Division 1
| Pos | Team | Pld | W | D | L | GF | GA | GD | Pts |
|---|---|---|---|---|---|---|---|---|---|
| 1 | Banditonce Kakogawa | 14 | 13 | 1 | 0 | 53 | 12 | +41 | 40 |
| 2 | Ain Food | 14 | 9 | 1 | 4 | 33 | 12 | +21 | 28 |
| 3 | Sanyo Electric Sumoto | 14 | 6 | 3 | 5 | 27 | 27 | 0 | 21 |
| 4 | Hannan University Club | 14 | 6 | 1 | 7 | 33 | 26 | +7 | 19 |
| 5 | Laranja Kyoto | 14 | 6 | 1 | 7 | 18 | 28 | −10 | 19 |
| 6 | Kyoto BAMB | 14 | 3 | 4 | 7 | 14 | 30 | −16 | 13 |
| 7 | Kobe 1970 | 14 | 3 | 3 | 8 | 12 | 36 | −24 | 12 |
| 8 | Diablossa Takada | 14 | 2 | 2 | 10 | 11 | 30 | −19 | 8 |

Division 2
| Pos | Team | Pld | W | D | L | GF | GA | GD | Pts |
|---|---|---|---|---|---|---|---|---|---|
| 1 | Shiga | 14 | 12 | 1 | 1 | 54 | 17 | +37 | 37 |
| 2 | Biwako Hira | 14 | 11 | 1 | 2 | 38 | 22 | +16 | 34 |
| 3 | Kyoto Shiko Club | 14 | 9 | 0 | 5 | 33 | 23 | +10 | 27 |
| 4 | Renaiss College | 14 | 7 | 0 | 7 | 42 | 29 | +13 | 21 |
| 5 | Glaspo Kashiwara | 14 | 7 | 0 | 7 | 31 | 28 | +3 | 21 |
| 6 | Mitsubishi Heavy Industries Kobe | 14 | 4 | 0 | 10 | 22 | 48 | −26 | 12 |
| 7 | Riseisha | 14 | 2 | 1 | 11 | 16 | 40 | −24 | 7 |
| 8 | Hermano Osaka | 14 | 2 | 1 | 11 | 13 | 42 | −29 | 7 |

=== Chūgoku ===
| Pos | Team | Pld | W | D | L | GF | GA | GD | Pts |
|---|---|---|---|---|---|---|---|---|---|
| 1 | Renofa Yamaguchi | 16 | 11 | 5 | 0 | 45 | 15 | +30 | 38 |
| 2 | Sagawa Express Chugoku | 16 | 10 | 2 | 4 | 36 | 12 | +24 | 32 |
| 3 | NTN Okayama | 16 | 10 | 2 | 4 | 42 | 22 | +20 | 32 |
| 4 | Ube Yahhh-Man | 16 | 9 | 3 | 4 | 26 | 21 | +5 | 30 |
| 5 | Dezzolla Shimane | 16 | 8 | 2 | 6 | 26 | 26 | 0 | 26 |
| 6 | Hitachi Kasado | 16 | 5 | 2 | 9 | 21 | 44 | −23 | 17 |
| 7 | Mazda | 16 | 4 | 1 | 11 | 17 | 37 | −20 | 13 |
| 8 | JFE Steel West Japan | 16 | 2 | 3 | 11 | 15 | 39 | −24 | 9 |
| 9 | Hiroshima Fujita | 16 | 2 | 2 | 12 | 17 | 29 | −12 | 8 |

=== Shikoku ===
| Pos | Team | Pld | W | D | L | GF | GA | GD | Pts |
|---|---|---|---|---|---|---|---|---|---|
| 1 | Kamatamare Sanuki | 14 | 13 | 1 | 0 | 62 | 4 | +58 | 40 |
| 2 | Tokushima Vortis Second | 14 | 11 | 2 | 1 | 68 | 5 | +63 | 35 |
| 3 | Ehime Shimanami | 14 | 7 | 3 | 4 | 19 | 19 | 0 | 24 |
| 4 | Nangoku Kochi | 14 | 6 | 2 | 6 | 36 | 23 | +13 | 20 |
| 5 | Sanyo Electric Tokushima | 14 | 4 | 3 | 7 | 12 | 29 | −17 | 15 |
| 6 | Ventana | 14 | 3 | 4 | 7 | 15 | 26 | −11 | 13 |
| 7 | Showa Club | 14 | 3 | 3 | 8 | 8 | 43 | −35 | 12 |
| 8 | Tokushima Comprille | 14 | 0 | 0 | 14 | 12 | 83 | −71 | 0 |

=== Kyushu ===
| Pos | Team | Pld | W | PKW | PKL | L | GF | GA | GD | Pts |
|---|---|---|---|---|---|---|---|---|---|---|
| 1 | Okinawa Kariyushi | 18 | 15 | 1 | 0 | 2 | 56 | 16 | +40 | 47 |
| 2 | V-Varen Nagasaki | 18 | 14 | 1 | 2 | 1 | 76 | 10 | +66 | 46 |
| 3 | Honda Lock | 18 | 14 | 2 | 0 | 2 | 62 | 14 | +48 | 46 |
| 4 | Nippon Steel Oita | 18 | 10 | 1 | 2 | 5 | 44 | 21 | +23 | 34 |
| 5 | Volca Kagoshima | 18 | 8 | 0 | 4 | 6 | 32 | 29 | +3 | 28 |
| 6 | Okinawa Kaiho Bank | 18 | 5 | 2 | 2 | 9 | 18 | 44 | −26 | 21 |
| 7 | Vainqueur Kumamoto | 18 | 6 | 1 | 0 | 11 | 25 | 73 | −48 | 20 |
| 8 | Kyushu Inax | 18 | 3 | 3 | 0 | 12 | 15 | 48 | −33 | 15 |
| 9 | Mitsubishi Heavy Industries Nagasaki | 18 | 2 | 1 | 1 | 14 | 20 | 60 | −40 | 9 |
| 10 | Osumi NIFS United | 18 | 0 | 1 | 2 | 15 | 11 | 44 | −33 | 4 |
