= Matsumoto Yamaga FC =

Japanese football club

Matsumoto Yamaga 松本山雅
- Full name: Matsumoto Yamaga Football Club
- Nicknames: Ptarmigans, Gans
- Founded: 1965; 61 years ago as Yamaga Club
- Stadium: Matsumoto Stadium (Alwin); Matsumoto, Nagano
- Capacity: 20,396
- Chairman: Fumiyuki Kanda
- Manager: Nobuhiro Ishizaki
- League: J3 League
- 2025: J3 League, 15th of 20
- Website: yamaga-fc.com
Home colours	Away colours

Matsumoto Yamaga Football Club (松本山雅フットボールクラブ, Matsumoto Yamaga Futtobōru Kurabu) or simply Matsumoto Yamaga (松本山雅FC, Matsumoto Yamaga Efu Shī) is a Japanese football (soccer) club based in the city of Matsumoto, located in the Nagano Prefecture. The club currently plays in the J3 League, Japanese third tier of professional football.

== History ==
The club was founded in 1965 by the players who represented Nagano Prefecture. The players frequented a cafe called Yamaga in front of Matsumoto railway station and initially they were simply called Yamaga Club. In 2004, they were renamed as Matsumoto Yamaga when nonprofit organisation Alwin Sports Project were set up to support the club with the intention of promotion to J. League. The very coffee shop where they founded the club no longer exists, but the club opened a new one in 2017.

In the 2007 and 2008 season they finished respectively 1st and 4th in the Hokushin'etsu First Division, but failed to gain the promotion to the Japan Football League as they exited at the group stage of the Regional League promotion series against other regional champions. 2008 also brought a crucial Emperor's Cup run, where they defeated former Japanese champions Shonan Bellmare in the third round by penalty kicks, only to be eliminated 8–0 by Vissel Kobe.

The 2009 season brought inconsistency, as they took 4th place in the regional league but knocked Urawa Red Diamonds out of the Emperor's Cup in the second round, their biggest giant-killing ever.

By virtue of winning the Shakaijin Cup, they earned a berth in the Regional League promotion series, and won the series at home to earn promotion to the Japan Football League for 2010. They earned 7th place on their first season in the third tier.

In 2011, despite a season thrown off by the Tōhoku earthquake and tsunami and the resulting inability of Sony Sendai to play a full schedule, Yamaga earned 4th place and were promoted to J. League Division 2. After three seasons they earned their first ever promotion to J1 League, only to be relegated after one season.

After failing to secure promotion in 2016 and 2017, Yamaga finished their 2018 season at the top of the J2 table, winning their first ever league title and securing automatic promotion to J1 in the process.

This began the downfall of Matsumoto Yamaga, due to the club's bad idea of high player turnover. Ahead of the 2020 J2 League, Yamaga turned over more than 20 players, in which began a slow start in 2020, as the club also went through many winless runs, including 5 losses in a row, which at the time was a record number of defeats for the club in J2. Eventually, in September 2020, manager Keiichiro Nuno was sacked, and the club finished 13th that season. Things were about to get worse as they continued high player turnover, with twenty-seven players leaving and twenty-four coming to the club before the 2021 J2 League. In June that year, Nuno's replacement, Kei Shibata, was fired from the club, and was replaced with Hiroshi Nanami, who couldn't help the club escape relegation after finishing dead last that season.

In 2022, Matsumoto played its first season on the J3. Matsumoto failed to be promoted back to the J2 League, as it finished on fourth place in the final standings of the 2022 J3 League season. The club ended tied on points with Kagoshima United, with both having earned 66 points in 34 matches. However, the goal difference stood out in Kagoshima's favour. The club will play its third consecutive season at the J3 during 2024.

== Rivalry ==
The biggest rival of Matsumoto Yamaga are the prefectural neighbours and former Hokushin'etsu League fellows Nagano Parceiro. Matches between those teams are labelled "Shinshū derby" and generate a lot of interest in both cities. For 2011 season, Parceiro joined their rivals in JFL bringing the derby to the national level.

== Stadium ==
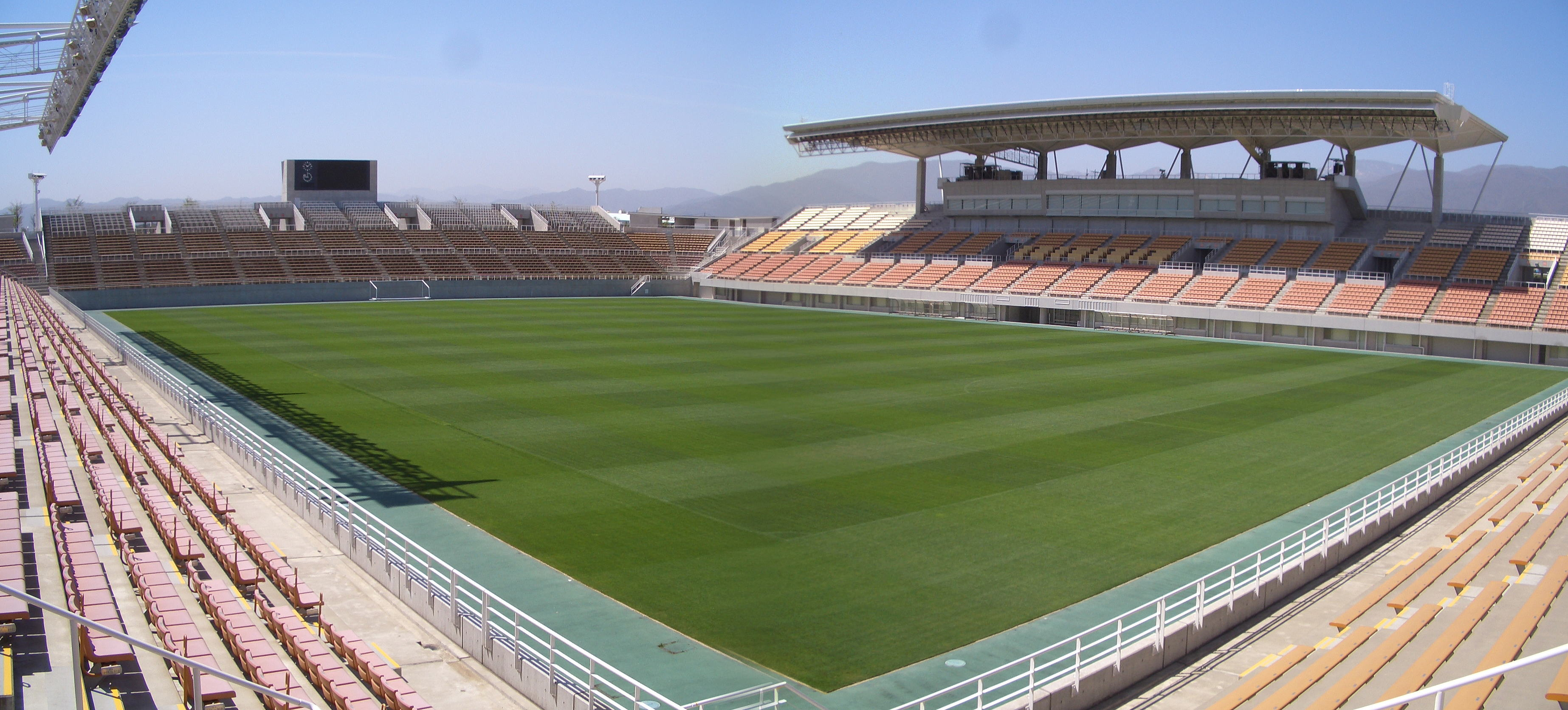
Matsumoto Stadium (Alwin)

Matsumoto Yamaga's home ground is Matsumoto Stadium (popularly known as Alwin) located in the Kambayashi area of Matsumoto city. The stadium has a capacity of 20,000 (16,000 seats and 4,000 standings). It is the third largest Sport venue in Nagano Prefecture.

== Mascot ==
The mascot of the club is named "Gans-kun" (ガンズくん), who is a Ptarmigan (ターミガン, Tāmigan), the symbol bird of Nagano Prefecture.

== Theme song ==
The club's theme song is "wanna be a superstar" by local rock band ASIAN2.

== Affiliated clubs ==
- (Singapore) Geylang International (2016–present)

On 23 November 2016, Matsumoto Yamaga and Geylang International signed a Memorandum of Understanding (MOU) in a press event which was held at the Marina Bay Floating Platform. This MOU will enable both clubs to establish a platform to exchange expertise and knowledge with the objective of promoting cohesion and development of football between the two clubs. The MOU spells out possible areas of collaboration such as the exchange of players and technical staff for training attachments and loans. Geylang will be looking to select promising players from its Active SG-GIFC Soccer Academy and junior teams to send on short training stints with Matsumoto Yamaga while the Japanese club is also looking into the possibility of sending players from their junior team to Singapore for pre-season training stints. Amongst the key initiatives of the partnership with Matsumoto Yamaga is the exchange programmes for head coach, Mohd Noor Ali, who had a one-year attachment with the club in 2018, where he guided the club U18 B team to the Japan FA's Under-18 Football League Nagano prefecture title while on 17 August 2018, Anders Aplin become the first Singaporean football player to sign for a J.League team signing on loan until the end of the 2018 J2 League season in November.

On 30 October 2022, both clubs reaffirmed their close and long-standing relationship as Geylang International officials went to Japan to explore future collaborations going into the seventh year of partnership since 2016. Geylang International has a memorandum of understanding with J.League outfits, Matsumoto Yamaga that was signed in 2016, while Epson's relationship with the club also dates back to the same year when it became the club's platinum sponsor. In the last seven years, Epson has enjoyed premium hospitality access to the club's home matches and has also supported the Singaporean football community and youths with the staging of the Epson Youth Cup.

== League & cup record ==
Champions	Runners-up	Third place	Promoted	Relegated

League												J. League Cup	Emperor's Cup
Season	Division	Tier	Pos	P	W	D	L	F	A	GD	Pts	J. League Cup	Emperor's Cup
1975	Hokushin'etsu	3	6th	8	3	1	4	14	13	1	7	Not eligible	Did not qualify
1976	Hokushin'etsu	3	6th	9	2	4	3	17	14	3	8	Not eligible	Did not qualify
1977	Hokushin'etsu	3	8th	9	2	3	4	17	22	−5	7	Not eligible	Did not qualify
1978	Hokushin'etsu	3	10th	9	1	0	8	9	27	−18	2	Not eligible	Did not qualify
1979	Hokushin'etsu	3	2nd	9	6	1	2	18	11	7	13	Not eligible	Did not qualify
1980	Hokushin'etsu	3	4th	9	6	2	1	19	8	11	14	Not eligible	Did not qualify
1981	Hokushin'etsu	3	3rd	9	5	1	3	15	9	6	11	Not eligible	Did not qualify
1982	Hokushin'etsu	3	5th	9	4	1	4	11	10	1	9	Not eligible	Did not qualify
1983	Hokushin'etsu	3	7th	9	2	3	4	12	14	−2	7	Not eligible	Did not qualify
1984	Hokushin'etsu	3	7th	9	2	3	4	13	15	−2	7	Not eligible	Did not qualify
1985	Hokushin'etsu	3	1st	9	7	1	1	23	7	16	15	Not eligible	Did not qualify
1986	Hokushin'etsu	3	4th	9	4	2	3	21	13	8	10	Not eligible	Did not qualify
1987	Hokushin'etsu	3	4th	9	4	2	3	12	11	1	10	Not eligible	Did not qualify
1988	Hokushin'etsu	3	3rd	9	4	3	2	19	8	11	11	Not eligible	Did not qualify
1989	Hokushin'etsu	3	2nd	9	6	1	2	17	10	7	13	Not eligible	Did not qualify
1990	Hokushin'etsu	3	4th	9	3	4	2	16	14	2	10	Not eligible	Did not qualify
1991	Hokushin'etsu	3	5th	9	4	1	4	17	12	5	9	Not eligible	Did not qualify
1992	Hokushin'etsu	4	5th	9	4	3	2	15	12	3	11	Not eligible	Did not qualify
1993	Hokushin'etsu	4	6th	9	3	3	3	15	17	−2	9	Not eligible	Did not qualify
1994	Hokushin'etsu	3	5th	9	2	5	2	11	13	−2	9	Not eligible	Did not qualify
1995	Hokushin'etsu	3	6th	9	2	2	5	8	14	−6	8	Not eligible	Did not qualify
1996	Hokushin'etsu	3	5th	9	3	2	4	9	19	−10	11	Not eligible	Did not qualify
1997	Hokushin'etsu	3	8th	9	2	1	6	11	23	−12	7	Not eligible	1st round
1998	Hokushin'etsu	3	3rd	8	4	-	4	17	24	−7	12	Not eligible	Did not qualify
1999	Hokushin'etsu	4	9th	9	2(1)	-	7	4	29	−25	4	Not eligible	Did not qualify
2000	Hokushin'etsu	4	8th	8	1	0	7	6	18	−12	3	Not eligible	Did not qualify
2001	Hokushin'etsu	4	9th	8	0	2	6	4	24	−20	2	Not eligible	Did not qualify
2002	Hokushin'etsu	4	8th	9	3	1	5	12	18	−6	9	Not eligible	Did not qualify
2003	Hokushin'etsu	4	9th	12	1	4	7	13	42	−29	7	Not eligible	Did not qualify
2004	Hokushin'etsu (Div. 2)	5	6th	14	4	2	8	16	27	−11	14	Not eligible	Did not qualify
2005	Hokushin'etsu (Div. 2)	5	1st	13	8	3	2	36	11	25	27	Not eligible	Did not qualify
2006	Hokushin'etsu (Div. 1)	4	2nd	14	11	1	2	34	10	24	34	Not eligible	2nd round
2007	Hokushin'etsu (Div. 1)	4	1st	14	10	1	3	47	15	32	31	Not eligible	Did not qualify
2008	Hokushin'etsu (Div. 1)	4	4th	14	7	3	4	31	18	13	24	Not eligible	4th round
2009	Hokushin'etsu (Div. 1)	4	4th	14	9	2	3	40	14	26	29	Not eligible	3rd round
2010	JFL	3	7th	34	15	7	12	48	41	7	52	Not eligible	2nd round
2011	JFL	3	4th	34	17	8	8	60	38	22	59	Not eligible	4th round
2012	J2 League	2	12th	42	15	14	13	46	43	3	59	Not eligible	2nd round
2013	J2 League	2	7th	42	19	9	14	54	54	0	66	Not eligible	3rd Round
2014	J2 League	2	2nd	42	24	11	7	65	35	30	83	Not eligible	3rd round
2015	J1 League	1	16th	34	7	7	20	30	54	−24	28	Group stage	4th round
2016	J2 League	2	3rd	42	24	12	6	62	32	30	84	Not eligible	2nd round
2017	J2 League	2	8th	42	19	9	14	61	45	16	66	Not eligible	4th round
2018	J2 League	2	1st	42	21	14	7	54	34	20	77	Not eligible	3rd round
2019	J1 League	1	17th	34	6	13	15	21	40	-19	31	Group stage	2nd round
2020	J2 League	2	13th	42	13	15	14	44	52	-8	54	Group stage	Did not qualify
2021	J2 League	2	22nd	42	7	13	22	36	71	-35	34	Not eligible	3rd round
2022	J3 League	3	4th	34	20	6	8	46	33	13	66	Not eligible	2nd round
2023	J3 League	3	9th	38	15	9	14	51	47	4	54	Not eligible	Did not qualify
2024	J3 League	3	4th	38	16	12	10	61	45	16	60	2nd round	Did not qualify
2025	J3 League	3	15th	38	11	10	17	41	50	-9	43	2nd round	2nd round
2026	J3 League	3	26th	18	6(2)	-	6(4)	31	21	10	26	N/A	N/A
2026-27	J3 League	3	TBD	38								TBD	TBD

Key

- Pos. = Position in league; P = Games played; W = Games won; D = Games drawn; L = Games lost; F = Goals scored; A = Goals conceded; GD = Goals difference; Pts = Points gained
- Source: J.League Data Site

== Honours ==
Matsumoto Yamaga FC Honours
Honour	No.	Years
Hokushin'etsu Football League Div. 1	2	1985, 2007
Nagano Prefectural Soccer Championship Emperor's Cup Nagano Prefectural Qualifiers	8	1997, 2006, 2008, 2009, 2010, 2011, 2022, 2025
Hokushin'etsu Football League Div. 2	1	2005
Shakaijin Cup	1	2009
Regional League promotion series	1	2009
J2 League	1	2018

== Current squad ==
As of 19 October 2026.

Note: Flags indicate national team as defined under FIFA eligibility rules; some limited exceptions apply. Players may hold more than one non-FIFA nationality.

No.	Pos.	Nation	Player
4	DF	JPN	Kōdai Minoda
5	DF	JPN	Tatsuya Shirai
6	DF	JPN	Hiroki Noda
7	FW	JPN	Rimu Matsuoka
8	MF	JPN	Ryota Sawazaki
9	FW	BRA	Wellington
11	MF	JPN	Shota Kaneko
13	MF	JPN	Haruto Murakami
14	MF	JPN	Shogo Rikiyasu
15	DF	JPN	Ryo Takano
16	DF	JPN	Taiki Miyabe
17	FW	JPN	Yuya Taguchi
18	FW	JPN	Ryo Sato (on loan from Ehime FC)
19	FW	JPN	Sora Tanaka
20	MF	JPN	Ryota Shibuya
21	GK	JPN	Masaya Tomizawa
22	DF	JPN	Kazuaki Saso

No.	Pos.	Nation	Player
23	GK	JPN	Ryota Koma
25	DF	JPN	Kei Murakami (on loan from Yokohama F. Marinos)
30	DF	JPN	Kengo Kitazume (on loan from Shimizu S-Pulse)
31	GK	JPN	Masataka Kobayashi (on loan from FC Tokyo)
32	FW	JPN	Seia Kunori
33	GK	KOR	Kim Jun-hyeon
34	FW	JPN	Oga Yoshizawa ^{Type 2}
35	GK	JPN	Kenta Oka ^{Type 2}
36	MF	JPN	Gen Matsumura
38	FW	JPN	Kosuke Fujieda
39	FW	JPN	Aren Inoue (on loan from Sanfrecce Hiroshima)
40	DF	JPN	Daiki Higuchi
43	DF	JPN	Kota Kaneko
45	DF	JPN	Kento Watanabe ^{DSP}
46	MF	JPN	Reo Yasunaga
48	MF	JPN	Kotatsu Kawakami

=== Out on loan ===
Note: Flags indicate national team as defined under FIFA eligibility rules; some limited exceptions apply. Players may hold more than one non-FIFA nationality.

No.	Pos.	Nation	Player
—	MF	JPN	Shotaro Hagiwara (at Fukui United FC)
—	DF	KOR	To-bin Lee (at YSCC Yokohama)

No.	Pos.	Nation	Player
—	DF	JPN	Jiyo Ninomiya (at Basara Hyogo)
—	MF	JPN	Kyoya Hayakawa (at JSC FC)

== Club officials ==
As of 21 February 2026

Position	Name
Manager	(Japan) Nobuhiro Ishizaki
Head coach	(Japan) Kenji Takahashi
Coach	(Japan) Akira Muto
Technical coach	(Japan) Kensuke Akasaka
Goalkeeper coach	(Japan) Masaaki Furukawa
Physical Coach	(Japan) Yi Chang-yeob
Doctor	(Japan) Takashige Momose
Chief trainer	(Japan) Hirotaka Ogawa
Trainer	(Japan) Chisato Chiba (Japan) Fumiya Sugiuchi
Physiotherapist	(Japan) Toshiki Sugiyama
Competent	(Japan) Kazumasa Kirabayashi

== Managerial history ==
Manager	Nationality	Tenure	
Manager	Nationality	Start	Finish
Katsua Kobayashi	Japan	2004	
Keiju Karashima	Japan	1 February 2005	31 January 2008
Hideo Yoshizawa	Japan	21 February 2008	8 June 2011
Yoshiyuki Katō	Japan	9 June 2011	31 January 2012
Yasuharu Sorimachi	Japan	1 February 2012	31 January 2020
Keiichirō Nuno	Japan	1 February 2020	24 September 2020
Kei Shibata	Japan	25 September 2020	20 June 2021
Hiroshi Nanami	Japan	21 June 2021	31 January 2023
Masahiro Shimoda	Japan	1 February 2023	31 January 2025
Tomonobu Hayakawa	Japan	1 February 2025	29 November 2025
Nobuhiro Ishizaki	Japan	8 December 2025	Present

== Kit evolution ==
First kit - home
2005	2006	2007	2008	2009
2010	2011	2012	2013	2014
2015	2016	2017	2018	2019
2020	2021	2022	2023	2024
2025	2026 -			

Second kit - away
2006	2007	2008	2009	2010
2011	2012	2013	2014	2015
2016	2017	2018	2019	2020
2021	2022	2023	2024	2025 -

Third kit
2015; Club; 50th anniversary	2016; Mountain Day	2017 3rd	2017; Mountain Day	2018; Mountain Day
2019; Mountain Day	2020; Club; 55th anniversary	2021 SP	2022; Summer	2023; Summer
2024; Summer	2025; 60th Anniversary; EMERALD			
