= 2002 Japanese Regional Leagues =

Japanese amateur leagues football season

Japanese Regional Leagues
- Season: 2002

Statistics of Japanese Regional Leagues for the 2002 season.

== Champions list ==
Region	Champions
Hokkaido	Yuubari Barefoot
Tohoku	TDK
Kanto	Ome
Hokushinetsu	Nagano Elsa
Tokai	Shizuoka
Kansai	Sagawa Printing
Chugoku	Mitsubishi Motors Mizushima
Shikoku	Nangoku Kochi
Kyushu	Okinawa Kariyushi

== League standings ==
=== Hokkaido ===
Division 1
Pos	Team	Pld	W	PKW	PKL	L	GF	GA	GD	Pts
1	Yuubari Barefoot	10	7	2	0	1	29	12	+17	25
2	Hokuden	10	5	2	1	2	20	15	+5	20
3	Sapporo Thank	10	3	1	2	4	14	15	−1	13
4	Sapporo	10	3	1	2	4	19	23	−4	13
5	Obihiro	10	3	1	0	6	18	28	−10	11
6	Blackpecker Hakodate	10	2	0	2	6	11	18	−7	8

Division 2
Pos	Team	Pld	W	PKW	PKL	L	GF	GA	GD	Pts
1	Chitose Bombers	10	6	1	2	1	21	10	+11	22
2	Nippon Steel Muroran	10	7	0	0	3	34	17	+17	21
3	Toyota Motors Hokkaido	10	4	4	0	2	20	13	+7	20
4	Erizenmaki Vankei	10	3	0	3	4	17	27	−10	12
5	Sapporo University OB	10	1	2	1	6	14	21	−7	8
6	JSW Muroran	10	2	0	1	7	10	28	−18	7

=== Tohoku ===
Division 1
Pos	Team	Pld	W	D	L	GF	GA	GD	Pts
1	TDK	14	13	1	0	39	6	+33	40
2	NEC Tokin	14	7	3	4	30	16	+14	24
3	Aster Aomori	14	6	3	5	33	24	+9	21
4	Primeiro	14	6	1	7	21	27	−6	19
5	Morioka Zebra	14	5	2	7	20	24	−4	17
6	Nippon Steel Kamaishi	14	5	2	7	20	26	−6	17
7	Akita City Government	14	5	1	8	22	29	−7	16
8	Matsushima	14	2	1	11	15	48	−33	7

Division 2 North
Pos	Team	Pld	W	D	L	GF	GA	GD	Pts
1	Hokuto Bank SC	10	7	1	2	37	10	+27	22
2	Ashikaga Engineering Kawabe	10	7	0	3	40	17	+23	21
3	Tono Club	10	6	2	2	21	9	+12	20
4	Hachinohe Kosei	10	4	0	6	22	44	−22	12
5	Omiya	10	3	1	6	18	32	−14	10
6	Ground Self Defence Forces Hachinohe	10	0	2	8	9	35	−26	2

Division 2 South
Pos	Team	Pld	W	D	L	GF	GA	GD	Pts
1	Sagawa Express Tohoku	10	10	0	0	79	2	+77	30
2	Sendai Nakada Club	10	6	1	3	34	22	+12	19
3	Furukawa Battery	10	6	1	3	33	24	+9	19
4	Yamagata	10	3	0	7	15	28	−13	9
5	Kushibiki Club	10	2	2	6	15	40	−25	8
6	Matsushita Electric Fukushima	10	1	0	9	9	69	−60	3

=== Kanto ===
Pos	Team	Pld	W	PKW	PKL	L	GF	GA	GD	Pts
1	Ome	9	6	2	0	1	18	8	+10	28
2	Horikoshi	9	5	1	0	3	20	16	+4	22
3	Nirasaki Astros	9	3	3	2	1	10	8	+2	20
4	Honda Luminozo Sayama	9	3	2	1	3	13	8	+5	17
5	Maritime Self Defence Forces Atsugi Base Marcus	9	4	0	1	4	14	12	+2	17
6	Toho Titanium	9	3	2	1	3	19	19	0	17
7	Aries Tokyo	9	3	0	3	3	11	12	−1	15
8	Yaita	9	2	2	1	4	13	17	−4	13
9	Tonan	9	2	0	3	4	13	19	−6	11
10	Saitama	9	2	0	0	7	12	24	−12	8

=== Hokushinetsu ===
Pos	Team	Pld	W	OTW	D	L	GF	GA	GD	Pts
1	Nagano Elsa	9	8	1	0	0	31	3	+28	26
2	Kanazawa	9	6	0	0	3	17	6	+11	18
3	Valiente Toyama	9	5	0	0	4	18	13	+5	15
4	Niigatashuyukai	9	4	0	0	5	8	12	−4	12
5	Nissei Plastic Industrial	9	3	1	1	4	13	21	−8	12
6	Ueda Gentian	9	4	0	0	5	12	20	−8	12
7	Teihens	9	3	1	0	5	14	15	−1	11
8	Yamaga	9	2	1	1	5	12	18	−6	9
9	Matto Orange Monkey	9	3	0	0	6	13	22	−9	9
10	Fukui	9	2	0	0	7	19	27	−8	6

=== Tokai ===
Division 1
Pos	Team	Pld	W	D	L	GF	GA	GD	Pts
1	Shizuoka	16	12	1	3	45	16	+29	37
2	Yazaki Valente	16	11	0	5	38	24	+14	33
3	Fujieda City Government	16	8	4	4	34	18	+16	28
4	Chuo Bohan	16	8	4	4	32	25	+7	28
5	Hitachi Shimizu	16	6	3	7	19	21	−2	21
6	Chukyo University	16	6	2	8	26	28	−2	20
7	Maruyasu	16	4	5	7	22	28	−6	17
8	Nagoya	16	5	1	10	23	35	−12	16
9	Honda Suzuka	16	1	2	13	15	59	−44	5

Division 2
Pos	Team	Pld	W	D	L	GF	GA	GD	Pts
1	Kasugai Club	14	6	4	4	24	17	+7	22
2	Konica Minolta Toyokawa	14	5	6	3	17	12	+5	21
3	Nagoya West F.C.	14	6	1	7	28	23	+5	19
4	Yamaha Motors	14	5	4	5	23	23	0	19
5	Toyota	14	5	4	5	18	20	−2	19
6	Iga F.C. MEW	14	6	1	7	19	25	−6	19
7	Mind House Yokkaichi	14	5	3	6	16	18	−2	18
8	Toyoda Machine Works	14	4	5	5	15	22	−7	17

=== Kansai ===
Pos	Team	Pld	W	D	L	GF	GA	GD	Pts
1	Sagawa Printing	13	12	1	0	44	10	+34	37
2	Ain Food	13	9	2	2	35	21	+14	29
3	Kobe 1970	13	7	2	4	33	27	+6	23
4	Central Kobe	13	4	2	7	16	24	−8	14
5	Hermano Osaka	13	4	2	7	18	31	−13	14
6	Osaka Gas	13	5	3	5	23	21	+2	18
7	Kyoto Shiko Club	13	5	1	7	21	24	−3	16
8	Takada	13	4	1	8	16	20	−4	13
9	Sanyo Electric Sumoto	13	3	3	7	27	37	−10	12
10	NTT West Japan Kyoto	13	2	3	8	16	34	−18	9

=== Chugoku ===
Pos	Team	Pld	W	PKW	PKL	L	GF	GA	GD	Pts
1	Mitsubishi Motors Mizushima	10	9	1	0	0	37	9	+28	29
2	Hiroshima Fujita	10	6	0	1	3	38	16	+22	19
3	Hiroshima	10	4	1	0	5	25	32	−7	14
4	Yamaguchi Teachers	10	3	1	1	5	17	31	−14	12
5	Iwami	10	6	1	0	3	21	12	+9	20
6	Mazda	10	3	0	1	6	9	15	−6	10
7	Hiroshima Teachers	10	2	1	2	5	19	27	−8	10
8	Nisshin Steel Kure	10	1	1	1	7	11	35	−24	6

=== Shikoku ===
Pos	Team	Pld	W	D	L	GF	GA	GD	Pts
1	Nangoku Kochi	14	12	1	1	46	11	+35	37
2	Sunlife	14	10	0	4	33	28	+5	30
3	Imao	14	8	1	5	42	21	+21	25
4	Alex	14	7	1	6	38	32	+6	22
5	Sanwa Club	14	5	2	7	27	35	−8	17
6	Sanyo Electric Tokushima	14	4	3	7	19	36	−17	15
7	Teijin	14	2	5	7	15	23	−8	11
8	NTT Shikoku	14	1	1	12	11	45	−34	4

=== Kyushu ===
Pos	Team	Pld	W	PKW	PKL	L	GF	GA	GD	Pts
1	Okinawa Kariyushi	18	17	1	0	0	79	14	+65	53
2	Volca Kagoshima	18	14	1	0	3	59	31	+28	44
3	Honda Lock	18	12	1	1	4	54	28	+26	39
4	Kyocera Sendai	18	7	2	1	8	25	35	−10	26
5	Nippon Steel Oita	18	8	0	1	9	29	35	−6	25
6	Lanza Kumamoto	18	7	0	0	11	19	48	−29	21
7	New Wave Kitakyushu	18	5	0	3	10	25	39	−14	18
8	Mitsubishi Heavy Industries Nagasaki	18	3	3	1	11	21	37	−16	16
9	Kyusyu Inax	18	4	1	0	13	18	37	−19	14
10	Kumamoto Teachers	18	3	1	3	11	23	48	−25	14
