= Shinji Tominari =

Japanese footballer

Shinji Tominari 冨成 慎司
Personal information
- Full name: Shinji Tominari
- Date of birth: February 22, 1987 (age 39)
- Place of birth: Gifu, Japan
- Height: 1.80 m (5 ft 11 in)
- Position: Right back

Youth career
- 2005–2008: Fukuoka University

Senior career*
Years	Team	Apps	(Gls)
2009–2011	FC Gifu	59	(3)
2012–2013	Fujieda MYFC	34	(2)
2014–2019	Kagoshima United	74	(3)
Total		167	(8)
- * Club domestic league appearances and goals

Shinji Tominari (冨成 慎司, Tominari Shinji; born February 22, 1987) is a Japanese retired football player.

== Career statistics ==
Updated to 23 February 2020.

Appearances and goals by club, season and competition
Club	Season	League			Emperor's Cup		Total	
Club	Season	Division	Apps	Goals	Apps	Goals	Apps	Goals
FC Gifu	2009	J2 League	44	3	4	0	48	3
FC Gifu	2010	J2 League	14	0	0	0	14	0
FC Gifu	2011	J2 League	1	0	0	0	1	0
Fujieda MYFC	2012	JFL	8	1	0	0	8	1
Fujieda MYFC	2013	JFL	26	1	1	0	27	1
Kagoshima United FC	2014	JFL	11	0	2	0	13	0
Kagoshima United FC	2015	JFL	22	1	0	0	22	1
Kagoshima United FC	2016	J3 League	30	1	1	0	31	1
Kagoshima United FC	2017	J3 League	9	1	1	0	10	1
Kagoshima United FC	2018	J3 League	0	0	1	1	1	1
Kagoshima United FC	2019	J2 League	2	0	0	0	2	0
Career total			167	8	10	1	177	9
