= 2007 Japanese Regional Leagues =

Japanese amateur leagues football season

Japanese Regional Leagues
- Season: 2007

Statistics of Japanese Regional Leagues for the 2007 season.

== Champions list ==
Region	Champions
Hokkaido	Norbritz Hokkaido
Tohoku	Grulla Morioka
Kantō	Machida Zelvia
Hokushin'etsu	Matsumoto Yamaga
Tōkai	Shizuoka
Kansai	Banditonce Kobe
Chūgoku	Fagiano Okayama
Shikoku	Tokushima Vortis Amateur
Kyushu	New Wave Kitakyushu

== League standings ==
=== Hokkaido ===
Pos	Team	Pld	W	D	L	GF	GA	GD	Pts
1	Norbritz Hokkaido	14	14	0	0	62	9	+53	42
2	Sapporo Wins	14	9	1	4	39	28	+11	28
3	Barefoot Hokkaido	14	6	2	6	26	24	+2	20
4	Toyota Motors Hokkaido	14	5	2	7	19	28	−9	17
5	Sapporo	14	4	2	8	23	34	−11	14
6	Blackpecker Hakodate	14	3	4	7	24	35	−11	13
7	Tokachi Fairsky	14	4	1	9	25	39	−14	13
8	Hokushukai	14	3	4	7	18	39	−21	13

=== Tohoku ===
Division 1
Pos	Team	Pld	W	D	L	GF	GA	GD	Pts
1	Grulla Morioka	14	13	0	1	65	14	+51	39
2	NEC Tokin	14	11	1	2	49	8	+41	34
3	Primeiro	14	7	1	6	33	37	−4	22
4	Shiogama Wiese	14	5	3	6	18	21	−3	18
5	Sendai Nakada	14	5	1	8	24	34	−10	16
6	Furukawa Battery	14	4	2	8	17	44	−27	14
7	Morioka Zebra	14	3	3	8	16	34	−18	12
8	Nippon Steel Kamaishi	14	1	3	10	15	45	−30	6

Division 2 North
Pos	Team	Pld	W	D	L	GF	GA	GD	Pts
1	Akita Cambiare	14	10	2	2	46	13	+33	32
2	Mizusawa Club	14	9	2	3	34	17	+17	29
3	Tono Club	14	8	3	3	32	23	+9	27
4	Fuji Club 2003	14	6	3	5	34	30	+4	21
5	Saruta Kōgyō S.C. [tl]	14	6	1	7	31	31	0	19
6	Vanraure Hachinohe	14	4	5	5	22	25	−3	17
7	Omiya	14	2	3	9	19	38	−19	9
8	Hokuto Bank SC	14	1	1	12	20	61	−41	4

Division 2 South
Pos	Team	Pld	W	D	L	GF	GA	GD	Pts
1	Viancone Fukushima	14	13	1	0	89	8	+81	40
2	Fukushima United	14	12	1	1	83	7	+76	37
3	Soma	14	8	1	5	25	22	+3	25
4	Marysol Matsushima	14	6	2	6	38	23	+15	20
5	Shichigahama	14	6	0	8	33	47	−14	18
6	Nakaniida	14	5	1	8	28	46	−18	16
7	Kanai Club	14	2	1	11	19	87	−68	7
8	Kureha	14	0	1	13	8	83	−75	1

=== Kantō ===
Division 1
Pos	Team	Pld	W	D	L	GF	GA	GD	Pts
1	Machida Zelvia	14	12	1	1	36	10	+26	37
2	Hitachi Tochigi Uva	14	9	0	5	33	17	+16	27
3	Honda Luminozo Sayama	14	6	2	6	19	23	−4	20
4	YSCC	14	6	1	7	23	23	0	19
5	Toho Titanium	14	5	3	6	17	24	−7	18
6	Saitama	14	4	3	7	16	22	−6	15
7	TFSC	14	4	2	8	17	20	−3	14
8	Yaita	14	2	4	8	12	34	−22	10

Division 2
Pos	Team	Pld	W	D	L	GF	GA	GD	Pts
1	Club Dragons	14	10	2	2	47	16	+31	32
2	Maritime Self Defence Forces Atsugi Base Marcus	14	7	6	1	29	15	+14	27
3	Hanno Bruder	14	5	6	3	28	18	+10	21
4	Furukawa Chiba	14	6	2	6	27	31	−4	20
5	Yono Shūkonkai	14	4	4	6	30	36	−6	16
6	Kanagawa Teachers	14	4	2	8	24	29	−5	14
7	Ome	14	3	4	7	25	36	−11	13
8	Nirasaki Astros	14	2	4	8	13	42	−29	10

=== Hokushin'etsu ===
Division 1
Pos	Team	Pld	W	D	L	GF	GA	GD	Pts
1	Matsumoto Yamaga	14	10	1	3	47	15	+32	31
2	Nagano Parceiro	14	10	1	3	35	18	+17	31
3	Japan Soccer College	14	9	2	3	37	13	+24	29
4	Zweigen Kanazawa	14	9	0	5	35	16	+19	27
5	Fervorosa Ishikawa Hakuzan	14	8	0	6	37	23	+14	24
6	Valiente Toyama	14	3	1	10	22	38	−16	10
7	Niigata University of Management	14	2	3	9	12	56	−44	9
8	Ueda Gentian	14	0	2	12	9	55	−46	2

Division 2
Pos	Team	Pld	W	D	L	GF	GA	GD	Pts
1	Granscena Niigata	14	10	1	3	27	8	+19	31
2	Saurcos Fukui	14	9	1	4	28	15	+13	28
3	Ohara JaSRA	14	8	2	4	33	22	+11	26
4	Antelope Shiojiri	14	6	5	3	23	18	+5	23
5	Cups Niigata	14	6	2	6	24	25	−1	20
6	Maruoka Phoenix	14	5	0	9	21	19	+2	15
7	Teihens (R)	14	3	3	8	18	32	−14	12
8	Toyama Shinjo (R)	14	1	2	11	14	49	−35	5

(R) Relegated

=== Tōkai ===
Division 1
Pos	Team	Pld	W	D	L	GF	GA	GD	Pts
1	Shizuoka	14	13	0	1	46	7	+39	39
2	Yazaki Valente	14	11	1	2	42	15	+27	34
3	Fujieda City Government	14	6	2	6	25	25	0	20
4	Sagawa Express Chukyo	14	5	1	8	19	35	−16	16
5	Chukyo University	14	5	0	9	21	22	−1	15
6	Maruyasu	14	4	2	8	18	35	−17	14
7	Kasugai Club	14	4	1	9	14	24	−10	13
8	Honda Suzuka	14	3	3	8	15	37	−22	12

Division 2
Pos	Team	Pld	W	D	L	GF	GA	GD	Pts
1	Mind House Yokkaichi	14	9	4	1	21	9	+12	31
2	Konica Minolta Toyokawa	14	7	4	3	28	17	+11	25
3	MIE Rampole	14	7	3	4	24	13	+11	24
4	Toyota	14	5	6	3	18	13	+5	21
5	Fuyō Club	14	5	4	5	19	19	0	19
6	Nagoya	14	4	3	7	22	19	+3	15
7	Morishins	14	2	4	8	19	37	−18	10
8	Kawasaki Heavy Industries Gifu	14	1	4	9	12	36	−24	7

=== Kansai ===
Division 1
Pos	Team	Pld	W	D	L	GF	GA	GD	Pts
1	Banditonce Kobe	14	13	0	1	55	8	+47	39
2	MIO Biwako Kusatsu	14	10	2	2	48	11	+37	32
3	Ain Food	14	7	3	4	17	17	0	24
4	Laranja Kyoto	14	6	2	6	19	31	−12	20
5	Kyoto BAMB	14	5	2	7	17	21	−4	17
6	Sanyo Electric Sumoto	14	5	0	9	17	39	−22	15
7	Kobe 1970	14	4	1	9	16	30	−14	13
8	Glaspo Kashiwara	14	0	2	12	12	44	−32	2

Division 2
Pos	Team	Pld	W	D	L	GF	GA	GD	Pts
1	Hannan University Club	14	11	3	0	66	14	+52	36
2	Takada	14	8	5	1	32	13	+19	29
3	Renaiss College	14	6	5	3	30	23	+7	23
4	Kyoto Shiko Club	14	5	5	4	34	26	+8	20
5	Mitsubishi Heavy Industries Kobe	14	5	3	6	25	30	−5	18
6	Riseisha	14	5	2	7	25	33	−8	17
7	Hermano Osaka	14	3	2	9	24	43	−19	11
8	Kihoku	14	0	1	13	22	76	−54	1

=== Chūgoku ===
Pos	Team	Pld	W	D	L	GF	GA	GD	Pts
1	Fagiano Okayama	17	17	0	0	87	4	+83	51
2	Central Chugoku	17	11	1	5	46	33	+13	34
3	Renofa Yamaguchi	17	6	4	7	33	46	−13	22
4	Sagawa Express Chugoku	17	7	0	10	35	40	−5	21
5	Hiroshima Fujita	17	7	3	7	27	29	−2	24
6	Mazda S.C.	17	6	4	7	22	30	−8	22
7	JFE Steel West Japan	17	3	2	12	19	46	−27	11
8	Hitachi Kasado	17	4	0	13	22	65	−43	12

- After 14 matches the league is split into two playoffs (top and bottom) of three games to decide the league champion and promotion candidates. This would normally also decide relegation candidates, though this did not happen this year due to league expansion. Owing to this, teams can have more points but still remain in a lower league position than others.

=== Shikoku ===
Pos	Team	Pld	W	D	L	GF	GA	GD	Pts
1	Tokushima Vortis Amateur	14	13	1	0	82	7	+75	40
2	Kamatamare Sanuki	14	12	1	1	68	14	+54	37
3	Nangoku Kochi	14	10	0	4	45	26	+19	30
4	Sanyo Electric Tokushima	14	7	0	7	22	32	−10	21
5	Ventana	14	4	2	8	17	46	−29	14
6	Ehime Shimanami	14	3	1	10	25	50	−25	10
7	Tokushima Comprille	14	3	0	11	18	52	−34	9
8	Sanwa Club	14	1	1	12	19	79	−60	4

=== Kyushu ===
Pos	Team	Pld	W	PKW	PKL	L	GF	GA	GD	Pts
1	New Wave Kitakyushu	20	17	1	1	1	53	7	+46	54
2	Honda Lock	20	17	0	1	2	76	19	+57	52
3	V-Varen Nagasaki	20	16	1	0	3	79	17	+62	50
4	Nippon Steel Oita	20	11	2	0	7	42	28	+14	37
5	Volca Kagoshima	20	10	1	1	8	58	36	+22	33
6	Oknawa Kariyushi	20	9	2	1	8	44	40	+4	32
7	Mitsubishi Heavy Industries Nagasaki	20	8	0	2	10	33	54	−21	26
8	Osumi NIFS United	20	6	0	1	13	31	46	−15	19
9	Okinawa Kaiho Bank	20	5	0	0	15	17	80	−63	15
10	Kumamoto Teachers	20	2	0	0	18	12	57	−45	6
11	Nanakuma Tombies	20	2	0	0	18	19	85	−66	6
