= Takuma Nagayoshi =

Japanese footballer

Personal information
- Date of birth: April 18, 1986 (age 40)
- Place of birth: Okayama, Japan
- Height: 1.79 m (5 ft 10 1/2 in)
- Position: Midfielder

Team information
- Current team: J-Lease FC
- Number: 15

Senior career*
Years	Team	Apps	(Gls)
2009–2011	FC Gifu	66	(2)
2011–2013	Oita Trinita	25	(0)
2014–2023	Tochigi SC	6	(0)
2015	→ SC Sagamihara (loan)	11	(0)
2023-	J-Lease FC	0	(0)
- * Club domestic league appearances and goals as of 23 February 2016

Takuma Nagayoshi (永芳 卓磨, Nagayoshi Takuma; born April 18, 1986) is a Japanese football player for J-Lease FC

== Career statistics ==
Updated to 23 February 2016.

Appearances and goals by club, season and competition
Club	Season	League			Emperor's Cup		J.League Cup		Total	
Club	Season	Division	Apps	Goals	Apps	Goals	Apps	Goals	Apps	Goals
FC Gifu	2009	J2 League	27	0	2	0	—		29	0
FC Gifu	2010	J2 League	28	1	1	0	—		29	1
FC Gifu	2011	J2 League	11	1	—		—		11	1
Oita Trinita	2011	J2 League	14	0	1	0	—		15	0
Oita Trinita	2012	J2 League	7	0	0	0	—		7	0
Oita Trinita	2013	J1 League	4	0	3	0	2	0	9	0
Tochigi SC	2014	J2 League	6	0	1	0	—		7	0
Tochigi SC	2015	J2 League	0	0	—		—		0	0
SC Sagamihara	2015	J3 League	11	0	—		—		11	0
Career total			108	2	8	0	2	0	118	2
