= Suguru Hashimoto =

Japanese footballer

Personal information
- Full name: Suguru Hashimoto
- Date of birth: June 16, 1982 (age 44)
- Place of birth: Amagasaki, Hyogo, Japan
- Height: 1.70 m (5 ft 7 in)
- Position: Midfielder

Team information
- Current team: Azul Claro Numazu
- Number: 29

Youth career
- 1995–1997: Wakakusa Junior High School
- 1998–2009: Seifu High School

College career
Years	Team	Apps	(Gls)
2001–2004	Kwansei Gakuin University		

Senior career*
Years	Team	Apps	(Gls)
2005–2006	Albirex Niigata Singapore	28	(5)
2007–2008	Vejle	4	(0)
2009–2012	FC Gifu	105	(1)
2013	Osotsapa	21	(0)
2014–2016	Bangkok		
2016–	Azul Claro Numazu		
Total		158	(6)
- * Club domestic league appearances and goals

Suguru Hashimoto (橋本 卓, Hashimoto Suguru; born June 16, 1982) is a Japanese football player. He plays for Azul Claro Numazu.

== Career ==
After graduating from Kwansei Gakuin University, he joined Albirex Niigata Singapore of Singapore's S.League. He played 25 games and scored two goals in two seasons from 2005 to 2006. He moved to Vejle Boldklub in 2007. On 18 January 2009, he signed with FC Gifu. On 25 January 2013, he signed with Osotsapa in the Thai Premier League. In December 2013, he signed with Bangkok F.C. in the Thai Division 1 League.

== Honours ==
=== Club ===
Vejle Boldklub

- Danish 1st Division Champions (1) : 2007-08
