= Yamata Sports Park Stadium =

Multi-purpose stadium in Tottori, Japan

Tottori Athletics Stadium
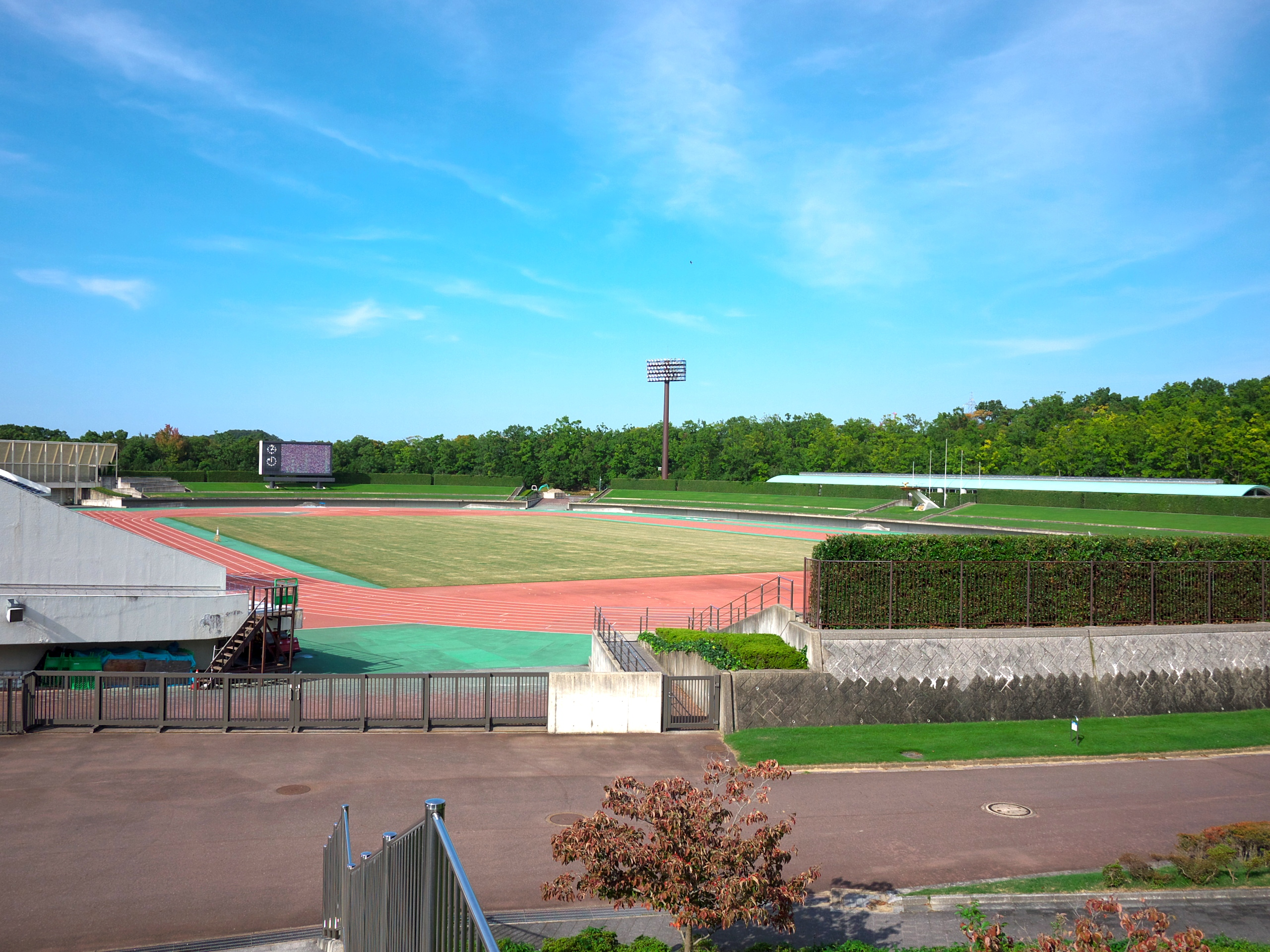
- Interactive map of Tottori Athletics Stadium
- Former names: Tottori Athletic Stadium; Coca-Cola West Sports Park Athletics
- Location: Tottori, Tottori, Japan
- Coordinates: 35°29′59.3″N 134°11′1.5″E
- Capacity: 30,000
- Surface: Grass

Construction
- Opened: 1966

Tenant
- Gainare Tottori

Tottori Athletic Stadium (鳥取県立布勢総合運動公園陸上競技場, Tottori kenritsu Fuse sōgōundōkōen rikujō kyōgiba) is a multi-purpose stadium in the city of Tottori, Tottori Prefecture, Japan.

It was the main stadium for the 40th National Athletic Meet held in 1985 and the 2004 88th Japan Athletics Championships. It is currently used mostly for football matches. The stadium holds 30,000 people.
