= Shogo Shimada (footballer) =

Japanese footballer

Personal information
- Date of birth: November 13, 1979 (age 46)
- Place of birth: Hyogo, Japan
- Height: 1.67 m (5 ft 5 1/2 in)
- Position: Midfielder

Youth career
- 1998–2001: Osaka University of Commerce

Senior career*
Years	Team	Apps	(Gls)
2002–2003	Ain Food		
2004–2007	Sagawa Express	102	(24)
2008–2011	FC Gifu	139	(18)
2012	Sagawa Shiga	30	(6)
Total		272	(48)
- * Club domestic league appearances and goals

Shogo Shimada (嶋田 正吾, Shimada Shogo; born November 13, 1979) is a former Japanese football player.

== Career statistics ==
Appearances and goals by club, season and competition
Club	Season	League			Emperor's Cup		Total	
Club	Season	Division	Apps	Goals	Apps	Goals	Apps	Goals
Sagawa Express Osaka	2004	Football League	25	3	—		25	3
Sagawa Express Osaka	2005	Football League	14	1	—		14	1
Sagawa Express Osaka	2006	Football League	32	7	—		32	7
Sagawa Express	2007	Football League	31	13	2	1	33	14
FC Gifu	2008	J2 League	14	0	2	0	16	0
FC Gifu	2009	J2 League	51	5	4	0	55	5
FC Gifu	2010	J2 League	36	7	1	0	37	7
Career total			203	36	9	1	212	37
