= 2011 FC Gifu season =

FC Gifu
2011 season
- Manager: Takahiro Kimura
- Stadium: Gifu Nagaragawa Stadium
- J2 League: 20 th

2011 FC Gifu season.

== J2 League ==
Match	Date	Team	Score	Team	Venue	Attendance
1	2011.03.06	FC Gifu	0-1	Oita Trinita	Gifu Nagaragawa Stadium	6,621
8	2011.04.23	Roasso Kumamoto	2-1	FC Gifu	Kumamoto Athletics Stadium	5,381
9	2011.04.30	FC Gifu	2-1	Mito HollyHock	Gifu Nagaragawa Stadium	5,832
10	2011.05.04	Kataller Toyama	1-0	FC Gifu	Toyama Stadium	4,142
11	2011.05.08	FC Gifu	1-3	Tokyo Verdy	Gifu Nagaragawa Stadium	3,083
12	2011.05.14	Yokohama FC	1-1	FC Gifu	NHK Spring Mitsuzawa Football Stadium	3,174
13	2011.05.22	FC Gifu	0-2	Tokushima Vortis	Gifu Nagaragawa Stadium	4,163
14	2011.05.27	Ehime FC	2-0	FC Gifu	Ningineer Stadium	1,982
15	2011.06.04	FC Gifu	0-1	Shonan Bellmare	Gifu Nagaragawa Stadium	5,004
16	2011.06.12	JEF United Chiba	3-1	FC Gifu	Fukuda Denshi Arena	8,802
17	2011.06.19	FC Gifu	1-3	Consadole Sapporo	Gifu Nagaragawa Stadium	3,945
18	2011.06.25	Sagan Tosu	2-0	FC Gifu	Best Amenity Stadium	4,427
2	2011.06.29	Gainare Tottori	1-1	FC Gifu	Tottori Bank Bird Stadium	2,633
19	2011.07.03	FC Gifu	3-2	Kyoto Sanga FC	Gifu Nagaragawa Stadium	3,337
20	2011.07.09	Tokyo Verdy	3-0	FC Gifu	Ajinomoto Stadium	3,296
21	2011.07.17	FC Tokyo	4-0	FC Gifu	Ajinomoto Stadium	17,183
22	2011.07.23	FC Gifu	0-1	Tochigi SC	Gifu Nagaragawa Stadium	3,218
23	2011.07.31	Consadole Sapporo	1-0	FC Gifu	Sapporo Atsubetsu Stadium	8,904
3	2011.08.07	FC Gifu	0-2	FC Tokyo	Gifu Nagaragawa Stadium	6,684
24	2011.08.13	FC Gifu	0-2	JEF United Chiba	Gifu Nagaragawa Stadium	4,842
25	2011.08.21	Mito HollyHock	1-2	FC Gifu	K's denki Stadium Mito	2,778
26	2011.08.27	FC Gifu	2-3	Gainare Tottori	Gifu Nagaragawa Stadium	3,519
4	2011.09.03	FC Gifu	1-3	Fagiano Okayama	Gifu Nagaragawa Stadium	2,408
27	2011.09.11	FC Gifu	1-1	Roasso Kumamoto	Gifu Nagaragawa Stadium	3,145
28	2011.09.19	Tokushima Vortis	4-1	FC Gifu	Pocarisweat Stadium	2,332
29	2011.09.24	FC Gifu	1-1	Ehime FC	Gifu Nagaragawa Stadium	2,595
5	2011.09.28	Tochigi SC	0-1	FC Gifu	Tochigi Green Stadium	2,493
30	2011.10.01	Giravanz Kitakyushu	3-2	FC Gifu	Honjo Stadium	3,492
31	2011.10.15	FC Gifu	4-3	Yokohama FC	Gifu Nagaragawa Stadium	5,236
6	2011.10.19	Thespa Kusatsu	4-2	FC Gifu	Shoda Shoyu Stadium Gunma	1,348
32	2011.10.22	Shonan Bellmare	7-1	FC Gifu	Hiratsuka Stadium	4,881
7	2011.10.26	FC Gifu	1-3	Giravanz Kitakyushu	Gifu Nagaragawa Stadium	2,150
33	2011.10.30	FC Gifu	4-4	Sagan Tosu	Gifu Nagaragawa Stadium	2,824
34	2011.11.06	Fagiano Okayama	1-2	FC Gifu	Kanko Stadium	6,431
35	2011.11.13	FC Gifu	0-1	Thespa Kusatsu	Gifu Nagaragawa Stadium	4,149
36	2011.11.20	Oita Trinita	2-1	FC Gifu	Oita Bank Dome	8,490
37	2011.11.27	FC Gifu	1-1	Kataller Toyama	Gifu Nagaragawa Stadium	5,518
38	2011.12.03	Kyoto Sanga FC	3-1	FC Gifu	Kyoto Nishikyogoku Athletic Stadium	6,715
