= Okinawa Kariyushi F.C. =

Japanese football club

- Full name: Okinawa Kariyushi Football Club
- Nickname: Kariyushi
- Founded: 1999
- Dissolved: 2010
- Ground: Naha City, Okinawa
- League: Kyushu Football League
- 2009: 1st
Home colours	Away colours	Third colours

Okinawa Kariyushi Football Club (沖縄かりゆしフットボールクラブ) was a Japanese football club from the Okinawa Prefecture, Japan.

== History ==
Okinawa Kariyushi F.C. was established in 1999 as the official football club of the Kariyushi Hotel Group, a hotel chain based in Okinawa. The team saw early action in competitions within the prefecture of Okinawa, including a runner-up finish in the Okinawa Times Cup Prefecture Football Championship, a qualifying tournament for the Emperor's Cup.

Starting in 2001, the club began competing in the first division of the Okinawa Prefectural League, in an attempt to earn promotion to the Japan Professional Football League. Former Tokyo Verdy player Ruy Ramos was hired as the team's player-manager in 2002, and the team established a satellite team known as Kariyushi Saussha for development purposes. In the same year, they played for the first time as representatives of Okinawa Prefecture in the 81st Emperor's Cup.

In 2002 and 2003, Okinawa Kariyushi F.C. finished in first place in the Kyushu Football League and advanced to the Emperor's Cup, with a promotion to the Japan Football League at stake. However, the team lost in the preliminary rounds in both tournaments. Following the 2003 season, Ramos and several other players left the team after a major disagreement and started a separate club, FC Ryukyu. This led to the club's disintegration, and the team's 27-man roster was disbanded.

In 2006, Okinawa Kariyushi F.C. began a series of reorganization efforts, centered around its satellite team Kariyushi Saussha, and rejoined the Kyushu Football League. The following year, the club advanced to the Emperor's Cup for the first time in four years, earning the right to participate over FC Ryukyu. Due to burgeoning travel and operational costs, club management subsequently announced a three-year plan to pay off debts while suspending player salaries, in order to maintain financial standing to remain in the Kyushu Football League.

In 2008, the first year of the three-year plan, Okinawa Kariyushi F.C. finished atop the Kyushu Football League, but lost to Yokohama FC in the third round of the Emperor's Cup. In 2009, the club advanced to the Emperor's Cup for the second consecutive year, but suffered a 4–0 loss to Nagoya Grampus in the second round, missing a chance to earn promotion.

On 10 December 2009, club president Shigeru Yuanaga announced that Okinawa Kariyushi F.C. would be permanently dissolved at the end of January 2010. Shigeru stated that the team's operating expenses, including travel costs and player salaries, had become too much for the club to bear, and a series of sponsorship negotiations with outside companies had fallen through. Following the announcement, several of the team's players and managers moved to FC Ryukyu.

== Etymology ==
"Kariyushi" is the word in the local dialect meaning "happiness" and "auspicious things". "I will aim for the local people's dreams and hopes, and aim for a team to give vitality", was the team's motto.

== Kit ==
Team colours were Orange and Marine Blue, representing the sun and the sea of Okinawa. Goalkeeping kits were green (home) and yellow (away).

== League history ==
Champions	Runners-up	Third place	Promoted	Relegated

League										Emperor's Cup
Season	Division	Pos.	P	W (PK)	L (PK)	F	A	GD	Pts	Emperor's Cup
2000	Okinawa Prefecture Division 3	1st								
2001	Okinawa Prefecture Division 1	1st	9	9	0				27	1st round
2002	Kyushu Soccer League	1st	18	17 (1)	0	79	14	65	53	1st round
2003	Kyushu Soccer League	1st	22	16 (2)	2 (2)	73	14	59	54	2nd round
2004	Kyushu Soccer League	2nd	18	14 (1)	3	54	15	39	44	
2005	Kyushu Soccer League	8th	18	3 (1)	12 (2)	18	48	-30	13	
2006	Kyushu Soccer League	5th	16	9	7	36	33	3	27	
2007	Kyushu Soccer League	6th	20	9	8 (1)	44	40	4	32	3rd round
2008	Kyushu Soccer League	1st	18	15 (1)	2	56	16	40	47	3rd round
2009	Kyushu Soccer League	1st	16	12 (3)	1	54	16	38	42	2nd round

Key

- Pos. = Position in league; GP = Games played; W (PK) = Games won (Games won by penalty kicks); L (PK) = Games Lost (Games lost by penalty kicks); F = Goals scored; A = Goals conceded; GD = Goal difference; Pts = Points gained

Okinawa Kariyushi honours
Honour	No.	Years
Okinawa Prefecture Division 3	1	2000
Okinawa Prefecture Division 1	1	2001
National Adult Soccer Championships	2	2002, 2004
Kyushu Soccer League	4	2002, 2003, 2008, 2009

== Managerial history ==
Manager	Nationality	Tenure	
Manager	Nationality	Start	Finish
Kazuyuki Takita	Japan	2001	2002
Kato Hisa	Japan	2003	2004
Shigeru Amonaga	Japan	2005	2006
Nakamoto Hiroshi	Japan	2007	2009

== See also ==
- FC Ryukyu
- Okinawa SV
