= Kazunori Kan =

Japanese footballer (born 1985)

Kazunori Kan 菅和範
Personal information
- Full name: Kazunori Kan
- Date of birth: November 11, 1985 (age 41)
- Place of birth: Imabari, Ehime, Japan
- Height: 1.77 m (5 ft 10 in)
- Position: Midfielder

Youth career
- 2004–2007: Kochi University

Senior career*
Years	Team	Apps	(Gls)
2008–2011	FC Gifu	137	(9)
2012–2020	Tochigi SC	158	(4)
- * Club domestic league appearances and goals as of 4 January 2021

Kazunori Kan (菅 和範, Kan Kazunori; born November 11, 1985 in Imabari, Ehime) is a Japanese retired football player.

== Club career ==
=== Tochigi SC ===
After nine seasons playing for Tochigi SC, Kan retired in December 2020.

== Club statistics ==
Updated to 23 February 2018.

Club performance			League		Cup		Total	
Season	Club	League	Apps	Goals	Apps	Goals	Apps	Goals
Japan			League		Emperor's Cup		Total	
2008	FC Gifu	J2 League	34	4	1	0	35	4
2009	FC Gifu	J2 League	46	4	4	0	50	4
2010	FC Gifu	J2 League	32	0	1	0	33	0
2011	FC Gifu	J2 League	25	1	1	0	26	1
2012	Tochigi SC	J2 League	32	1	0	0	32	1
2013	Tochigi SC	J2 League	25	0	2	0	27	0
2014	Tochigi SC	J2 League	11	0	1	0	12	0
2015	Tochigi SC	J2 League	22	0	0	0	22	0
2016	Tochigi SC	J3 League	23	1	–		23	1
2017	Tochigi SC	J3 League	23	2	–		23	2
Total			273	13	10	0	283	13
