= 2011 Urawa Red Diamonds season =

Urawa Red Diamonds
2011 season
- Chairman: Mitsuo Hashimoto
- Manager: Željko Petrović
- J. League: 15th
- Emperor's Cup: Quarter-finals
- J. League Cup: Runners-up
- Top goalscorer: League: Haraguchi (8); All: Haraguchi (9)
Home colours	Away colours

The 2011 Urawa Red Diamonds season was Urawa Red Diamonds' eleventh consecutive season in J. League Division 1, 18th season overall in the J. League, and 45th overall in the Japanese top flight. It also includes the Emperor's Cup, and the J. League Cup.

== Transfers ==
=== Winter transfers ===
In:

No.	Pos.	Nation	Player
4	DF	AUS	Matthew Špiranović (from 1. FC Nürnberg)
10	MF	BRA	Marcio Richardes (from Albirex Niigata)
12	DF	JPN	Koji Noda (loan return from Fagiano Okayama)
17	DF	JPN	Mitsuru Nagata (from Albirex Niigata)
19	DF	JPN	Shunsuke Tsutsumi (loan return from Roasso Kumamoto)
21	FW	JPN	Kazuki Hara (from Shimizu S-Pulse)
23	MF	JPN	Jun Aoyama (from Tokushima Vortis)
27	MF	JPN	Shuto Kojima (from Maebashi Ikuei High School)
28	DF	JPN	Takuya Okamoto (from Urawa Reds Youth)
29	FW	BRA	Mazola (loan from São Paulo FC)
—	GK	JPN	Ryota Tsuzuki (loan return from Shonan Bellmare)
—	DF	JPN	Masato Hashimoto (loan return from Tochigi S.C.)
—	MF	JPN	Yoshiya Nishizawa (loan return from Thespa Kusatsu)

Out:

No.	Pos.	Nation	Player
3	MF	JPN	Hajime Hosogai (to Bayer 04 Leverkusen)
5	MF	BFA	Wilfried Sanou (loan return to 1. FC Köln)
10	MF	BRA	Robson Ponte (released)
21	MF	JPN	Takuya Nagata (on loan to Thespa Kusatsu)
32	MF	JPN	Yusuke Hayashi (to Thespa Kusatsu)
—	GK	JPN	Ryota Tsuzuki (retired)
—	DF	JPN	Masato Hashimoto (to V-Varen Nagasaki)
—	MF	JPN	Yoshiya Nishizawa (to Tochigi S.C.)

=== Summer transfers ===
In:

No.	Pos.	Nation	Player
31	FW	SRB	Ranko Despotović (from Girona FC)

Out:

No.	Pos.	Nation	Player
9	FW	BRA	Edmilson (to Al-Gharafa)
19	DF	JPN	Shunsuke Tsutsumi (on loan to Tochigi S.C.)

== Goals and appearances ==
As of 28 August 2011

No.	Pos	Nat	Player	Total		League		Emperor's Cup		J. League Cup	
No.	Pos	Nat	Player	Apps	Goals	Apps	Goals	Apps	Goals	Apps	Goals
1	GK	(Japan) JPN	Norihiro Yamagishi	10	0	9	0	0	0	1	0
2	DF	(Japan) JPN	Keisuke Tsuboi	1	0	1	0	0	0	0	0
3	MF	(Japan) JPN	Tomoya Ugajin	11	0	9	0	0	0	2	0
4	DF	(Australia) AUS	Matthew Špiranović	23	0	22	0	0	0	1	0
5	MF	(Japan) JPN	Shunki Takahashi	25	0	23	0	0	0	2	0
6	DF	(Japan) JPN	Nobuhisa Yamada	21	0	20	0	0	0	1	0
7	MF	(Japan) JPN	Tsukasa Umesaki	4	1	4	1	0	0	0	0
8	MF	(Japan) JPN	Yosuke Kashiwagi	23	4	21	3	0	0	2	1
9	FW	(Brazil) BRA	Edmilson	13	4	12	3	0	0	1	1
10	MF	(Brazil) BRA	Márcio Richardes	23	2	21	2	0	0	2	0
11	FW	(Japan) JPN	Tatsuya Tanaka	20	2	19	2	0	0	1	0
12	DF	(Japan) JPN	Koji Noda	3	0	3	0	0	0	0	0
13	MF	(Japan) JPN	Keita Suzuki	21	1	19	1	0	0	2	0
14	DF	(Japan) JPN	Tadaaki Hirakawa	16	1	16	1	0	0	0	0
15	FW	(Japan) JPN	Sergio Escudero	13	1	12	1	0	0	1	0
16	FW	(Japan) JPN	Hiroyuki Takasaki	14	2	13	2	0	0	1	0
17	DF	(Japan) JPN	Mitsuru Nagata	26	2	24	2	0	0	2	0
18	GK	(Japan) JPN	Nobuhiro Kato	17	0	16	0	0	0	1	0
19	DF	(Japan) JPN	Shunsuke Tsutsumi	0	0	0	0	0	0	0	0
20	DF	(Japan) JPN	Satoshi Horinouchi	0	0	0	0	0	0	0	0
21	FW	(Japan) JPN	Kazuki Hara	7	0	6	0	0	0	1	0
22	MF	(Japan) JPN	Naoki Yamada	14	1	12	1	0	0	2	0
23	MF	(Japan) JPN	Jun Aoyama	1	0	1	0	0	0	0	0
24	FW	(Japan) JPN	Genki Haraguchi	22	9	21	8	0	0	1	1
25	GK	(Japan) JPN	Koki Otani	0	0	0	0	0	0	0	0
26	DF	(Japan) JPN	Mizuki Hamada	0	0	0	0	0	0	0	0
27	MF	(Japan) JPN	Shuto Kojima	3	0	2	0	0	0	1	0
28	DF	(Japan) JPN	Takuya Okamoto	0	0	0	0	0	0	0	0
29	FW	(Brazil) BRA	Mazola	20	3	18	3	0	0	2	0
30	GK	(Japan) JPN	Ryota Mikami	0	0	0	0	0	0	0	0
31	FW	(Serbia) SRB	Ranko Despotović	9	1	8	0	0	0	1	1
32	MF	(Japan) JPN	Masaya Nozaki	0	0	0	0	0	0	0	0
32	MF	(Japan) JPN	Shinya Yajima	0	0	0	0	0	0	0	0

== Results ==
=== J. League Division 1 ===
==== League table ====
Pos	Team	Pld	W	D	L	GF	GA	GD	Pts	Qualification or relegation
13	Omiya Ardija	34	10	12	12	38	48	−10	42	
14	Albirex Niigata	34	10	9	15	38	46	−8	39	
15	Urawa Red Diamonds	34	8	12	14	36	43	−7	36	
16	Ventforet Kofu (R)	34	9	6	19	42	63	−21	33	Relegation to 2012 J. League Division 2
17	Avispa Fukuoka (R)	34	6	4	24	34	75	−41	22	Relegation to 2012 J. League Division 2

Updated to match(es) played on December 3, 2011. Source: J.League Division 1
Rules for classification: 1st points; 2nd goal differential; 3rd goals scored; 4th head-to-head results; 5th disciplinary points; 6th draw. If two clubs are tied for first place, both clubs will be declared.
(R) Relegated

==== Matches ====
Win Draw Loss

Scores are given with Urawa Reds score listed first.

Game	Date	Venue	Opponent	Result F–A	Attendance	Urawa Reds scorers
1	6 March 2011	A	Vissel Kobe	0–1	19,913
7	24 April 2011	H	Nagoya Grampus	3–0	42,767	Márcio Richardes 12', Tanaka 25', Haraguchi 78'
8	29 April 2011	A	Vegalta Sendai	0–1	18,456
9	3 May 2011	H	Yokohama F. Marinos	0–2	47,056
10	7 May 2011	A	Kashiwa Reysol	1–3	24,222	Haraguchi 90+2'
11	15 May 2011	H	Cerezo Osaka	1–1	31,571	Haraguchi 8'
12	21 May 2011	H	Kashima Antlers	2–2	37,521	Takasaki 67', Mazola 69'
13	28 May 2011	H	Albirex Niigata	1–1	25,272	Edmilson 22'
14	11 June 2011	A	Omiya Ardija	2–2	12,221	Edmilson 56', Haraguchi 78'
15	15 June 2011	A	Sanfrecce Hiroshima	0–0	13,707
16	18 June 2011	H	Shimizu S-Pulse	1–3	31,921	Umesaki 80'
17	22 June 2011	H	Avispa Fukuoka	3–0	20,240	Suzuki 53', Márcio Richardes 73', Edmilson 90+1'
18	25 June 2011	A	Nagoya Grampus	1–1	28,515	Mazola 90+8'
2^{1}	2 July 2011	H	Gamba Osaka	1–1	42,331	Haraguchi 77'
3^{1}	6 July 2011	A	Montedio Yamagata	0–0	8,303
4^{1}	13 July 2011	H	Kawasaki Frontale	2–0	24,293	Haraguchi 57', Nagata 79'
5^{1}	17 July 2011	A	Júbilo Iwata	1–1	18,623	Kashiwagi 29'
6^{1}	23 July 2011	H	Ventforet Kofu	2–0	31,369	Hirakawa 53', Kashiwagi 73'
19	30 July 2011	A	Kawasaki Frontale	1–0	20,047	Komiyama 10' (o.g.)
20	6 August 2011	H	Vissel Kobe	2–3	32,231	Tanaka 47', Mazola 77'
21	14 August 2011	A	Albirex Niigata	3–2	37,375	Haraguchi 8', Nagata 38', Naoki Yamada 61'
22	20 August 2011	A	Ventforet Kofu	2–3	21,589	Kashiwagi 23', Escudero 83'
23	24 August 2011	H	Sanfrecce Hiroshima	1–1	27,947	Haraguchi 54'
24	28 August 2011	A	Cerezo Osaka	1–3	26,248	Takasaki 78'
25	11 September 2011	H	Montedio Yamagata	0–1	27,709
26	17 September 2011	A	Shimizu S-Pulse	0–1	21,524
27	24 September 2011	A	Kashima Antlers	0–0	25,106
28	2 October 2011	A	Gamba Osaka	0–1	20,053
29	15 October 2011	H	Omiya Ardija	0–1	34,654
30	22 October 2011	A	Yokohama F. Marinos	2–1	27,527	Haraguchi 50', Umesaki 61'
31	3 November 2011	H	Júbilo Iwata	0–3	34,263
32	19 November 2011	H	Vegalta Sendai	0–0	30,891
33	26 November 2011	A	Avispa Fukuoka	2–1	17,177	Kashiwagi 45', Márcio Richardes 63' (pen.)
34	3 December 2011	H	Kashiwa Reysol	1–3	54,441	Kashiwagi 53'

^{1}Game postponed because of Tōhoku earthquake.

=== Emperor's Cup ===
Win Draw Loss

=== J. League Cup ===
Win Draw Loss

Scores are given with Urawa Reds score listed first.

Game	Date	Venue	Opponent	Result F–A	Attendance	Urawa Reds scorers
1	5 June 2011	H	Montedio Yamagata	2–0	23,275	Edmilson 45', Haraguchi 89'
1	27 July 2011	A	Montedio Yamagata	2–1	5,012	Kashiwagi 48', Despotović 74'
2	14 September 2011	H	Omiya Ardija
2	28 September 2011	A	Omiya Ardija

== See also ==
- 2011 J. League Division 1
- 2011 Emperor's Cup
- 2011 J. League Cup
- Urawa Red Diamonds
