= 2009 Urawa Red Diamonds season =

Urawa Red Diamonds
2009 season
- Chairman: Mitsuo Hashimoto
- Manager: Volker Finke
- Stadium: Saitama Stadium 2002
- J.League 1: 6th
- Emperor's Cup: 2nd round
- J.League Cup: Quarterfinals
- Top goalscorer: League: Edmilson (13); All: Edmilson (15)
- Highest home attendance: 53,374 (vs Gamba Osaka, 16 May 2009)
- Lowest home attendance: 17,172 (vs Júbilo Iwata, 3 June 2009)
- Average home league attendance: 39,655
Home colours	Away colours

2009 Urawa Red Diamonds season

== Competitions ==
Competitions	Position
J.League 1	6th / 18 clubs
Emperor's Cup	2nd Round
J.League Cup	Quarterfinals

== Domestic results ==
=== J.League 1 ===
Date	Kick Off (Local)	Opponent	H / A	Result F – A	Scorers	Attendance
7 March 2009	16:04	Kashima Antlers	A	0 – 2		37,878
14 March 2009	14:02	F.C. Tokyo	H	3 – 1	Abe 4', Edmilson 48', Ponte 83'	50,802
21 March 2009	14:03	Júbilo Iwata	A	1 – 1	Edmilson 68'	18,439
4 April 2009	16:03	Ōita Trinita	H	1 – 0	42' (o.g.)	45,542
12 April 2009	16:03	Nagoya Grampus	A	1 – 0	Haraguchi 43'	32,435
18 April 2009	19:04	Kyoto Sanga	H	1 – 0	Edmilson 7'	41,836
25 April 2009	16:03	JEF United	A	1 – 0	Edmilson 58'	15,428
29 April 2009	16:04	Shimizu S-Pulse	A	2 – 2	Ponte 35', Yamada 74'	30,851
2 May 2009	19:03	Albirex Niigata	H	1 – 0	Tanaka 89'	50,284
5 May 2009	16:04	Kashiwa Reysol	A	3 – 2	Edmilson 11', 84' (o.g.), Escudero 87'	32,854
10 May 2009	14:05	Kawasaki Frontale	H	2 – 3	Edmilson 31', Tanaka 64'	51,594
16 May 2009	14:04	Gamba Osaka	H	0 – 0		53,374
24 May 2009	16:00	Omiya Ardija	A	1 – 1	Hosogai 35'	37,027
21 June 2009	14:04	Yokohama F. Marinos	A	0 – 2		40,228
27 June 2009	16:03	Vissel Kobe	H	2 – 0	Edmilson 2', Takahara 42'	18,777
4 July 2009	19:04	Montedio Yamagata	A	3 – 2	Edmilson 44', Takahara (2) 47', 82'	20,102
11 July 2009	19:04	Sanfrecce Hiroshima	H	2 – 1	Edmilson (2) 68', 84'	44,149
18 July 2009	19:05	Ōita Trinita	A	0 – 1		24,833
25 July 2009	19:03	Nagoya Grampus	H	0 – 3		44,976
2 August 2009	18:03	Shimizu S-Pulse	H	0 – 1		45,186
15 August 2009	19:03	Gamba Osaka	A	0 – 1		20,211
19 August 2009	19:33	Kashiwa Reysol	H	1 – 4	Tanaka 38'	38,740
22 August 2009	19:04	Sanfrecce Hiroshima	A	1 – 2	Tanaka 68'	27,113
29 August 2009	19:04	Vissel Kobe	A	2 – 3	Escudero 41', Takahara 57'	19,094
13 September 2009	15:05	Montedio Yamagata	H	4 – 1	Escudero 4', Ponte 21', Hosogai 75', 86' (o.g.)	41,500
19 September 2009	19:03	Kawasaki Frontale	A	2 – 0	Ponte 67', Suzuki 80'	22,390
27 September 2009	14:05	Yokohama F. Marinos	H	1 – 2	Edmilson 15'	45,023
3 October 2009	15:34	JEF United	H	3 – 1	Abe 10', Edmilson 78', Takahashi 85'	38,634
17 October 2009	16:04	Albirex Niigata	A	1 – 0	Edmilson 1'	39,963
25 October 2009	15:03	Omiya Ardija	H	0 – 3		43,746
8 November 2009	15:00	F.C. Tokyo	A	1 – 0	Edmilson 49'	40,701
21 November 2009	14:03	Júbilo Iwata	H	3 – 2	Edmilson (3) 21', 82', 89'	43,619
28 November 2009	14:03	Kyoto Sanga	A	0 – 1		18,121
5 December 2009	15:30	Kashima Antlers	H	0 – 1		53,783

=== Emperor's Cup ===
Date	Kick Off (Local)	Opponent	H / A	Result F – A	Scorers	Attendance
11 October 2009	13:00	Matsumoto Yamaga	A	0 – 2		14,494

=== J.League Cup ===
Date	Kick Off (Local)	Opponent	H / A	Result F – A	Scorers	Attendance
25 March 2009	19:02	Sanfrecce Hiroshima	A	0 – 1		10,275
29 March 2009	15:00	Yokohama F. Marinos	A	1 – 0	Ponte 40' (pen.)	23,660
20 May 2009	19:35	Ōita Trinita	A	1 – 1	Yamada 41'	12,361
30 May 2009	15:00	Albirex Niigata	H	2 – 0	Nishizawa 28', Escudero 56'	27,446
3 June 2009	19:00	Júbilo Iwata	H	1 – 0	Takahara 25'	17,172
13 June 2009	14:00	Omiya Ardija	H	6 – 2	Naoki Yamada (2) 38', 52' (pen.), Edmilson 57', Takahara 52', Haraguchi 71', Nobuhisa Yamada 89'	36,251

Date	Kick Off (Local)	Opponent	H / A	Result F – A	Scorers	Attendance
15 July 2009	19:30	Shimizu S-Pulse	H	2 – 1	Tanaka 24', Edmilson 60'	21,271
29 July 2009	19:00	Shimizu S-Pulse	A	0 – 3		12,014

== Player statistics ==
No.	Pos.	Player	D.o.B. (Age)	Height / Weight	J.League 1		Emperor's Cup		J.League Cup		Total	
No.	Pos.	Player	D.o.B. (Age)	Height / Weight	Apps	Goals	Apps	Goals	Apps	Goals	Apps	Goals
1	GK	Norihiro Yamagishi	May 17, 1978 (aged 30)	cm / kg	11	0						
2	DF	Keisuke Tsuboi	September 16, 1979 (aged 29)	cm / kg	29	0						
3	MF	Hajime Hosogai	June 10, 1986 (aged 22)	cm / kg	31	2						
4	DF	Marcus Tulio Tanaka	April 24, 1981 (aged 27)	cm / kg	31	4						
6	DF	Nobuhisa Yamada	September 10, 1975 (aged 33)	cm / kg	30	0						
7	MF	Tsukasa Umesaki	February 23, 1987 (aged 22)	cm / kg	9	0						
8	MF	Alessandro Santos	July 20, 1977 (aged 31)	cm / kg	6	0						
10	MF	Robson Ponte	November 6, 1976 (aged 32)	cm / kg	28	4						
11	FW	Tatsuya Tanaka	November 27, 1982 (aged 26)	cm / kg	15	0						
12	DF	Shunsuke Tsutsumi	June 8, 1987 (aged 21)	cm / kg	0	0						
13	MF	Keita Suzuki	July 8, 1981 (aged 27)	cm / kg	32	1						
14	DF	Tadaaki Hirakawa	May 1, 1979 (aged 29)	cm / kg	11	0						
15	FW	Sergio Escudero	September 1, 1988 (aged 20)	cm / kg	23	3						
17	FW	Edmilson	September 15, 1982 (aged 26)	cm / kg	33	17						
18	MF	Takafumi Akahoshi	May 27, 1986 (aged 22)	cm / kg	0	0						
19	FW	Naohiro Takahara	June 4, 1979 (aged 29)	cm / kg	32	4						
20	DF	Satoshi Horinouchi	October 26, 1979 (aged 29)	cm / kg	15	0						
21	DF	Takuya Nagata	September 8, 1990 (aged 18)	cm / kg	3	0						
22	MF	Yuki Abe	September 6, 1981 (aged 27)	cm / kg	34	2						
23	GK	Ryōta Tsuzuki	April 18, 1978 (aged 30)	cm / kg	23	0						
24	FW	Genki Haraguchi	May 9, 1991 (aged 17)	cm / kg	32	1						
25	DF	Tetsushi Kondo	November 4, 1986 (aged 22)	cm / kg	0	0						
26	DF	Mizuki Hamada	May 18, 1990 (aged 18)	cm / kg	1	0						
27	DF	Yoshiya Nishizawa	June 13, 1987 (aged 21)	cm / kg	7	0						
28	GK	Nobuhiro Kato	December 11, 1984 (aged 24)	cm / kg	0	0						
29	GK	Koki Otani	April 8, 1989 (aged 19)	cm / kg	0	0						
30	DF	Koji Noda	August 17, 1986 (aged 22)	cm / kg	0	0						
30	FW	Faisal Mohammed	May 7, 1991 (aged 17)	cm / kg	0	0						
31	DF	Masato Hashimoto	October 12, 1989 (aged 19)	cm / kg	0	0						
32	MF	Yusuke Hayashi	January 23, 1990 (aged 19)	cm / kg	1	0						
33	MF	Shunki Takahashi	May 4, 1990 (aged 18)	cm / kg	12	1						
34	MF	Naoki Yamada	July 4, 1990 (aged 18)	cm / kg	20	1						
