= 2010 Urawa Red Diamonds season =

Urawa Red Diamonds
2010 season
- Manager: Volker Finke
- Stadium: Saitama Stadium 2002
- J. League 1: 10th
- Emperor's Cup: Quarterfinals
- J. League Cup: GL-B 5th
- Top goalscorer: Edmilson (16)
Home colours	Away colours

2010 Urawa Red Diamonds season

== Competitions ==
Competitions	Position
J. League 1	10th / 18 clubs
Emperor's Cup	Quarterfinals
J. League Cup	GL-B 5th / 7 clubs

=== J. League 1 ===
Pos	Team	Pld	W	D	L	GF	GA	GD	Pts
8	Yokohama F. Marinos	34	15	6	13	43	39	+4	51
9	Albirex Niigata	34	12	13	9	48	45	+3	49
10	Urawa Red Diamonds	34	14	6	14	48	41	+7	48
11	Júbilo Iwata	34	11	11	12	38	49	−11	44
12	Omiya Ardija	34	11	9	14	39	45	−6	42

Updated to match(es) played on December 4, 2010. Source: J.League Division 1
Rules for classification: 1) points; 2) goal difference; 3) number of goals scored.

== Player statistics ==
No.	Pos.	Player	D.o.B. (Age)	Height / Weight	J. League 1		Emperor's Cup		J. League Cup		Total	
No.	Pos.	Player	D.o.B. (Age)	Height / Weight	Apps	Goals	Apps	Goals	Apps	Goals	Apps	Goals
1	GK	Norihiro Yamagishi	May 17, 1978 (aged 31)	cm / kg	34	0						
2	DF	Keisuke Tsuboi	September 16, 1979 (aged 30)	cm / kg	31	0						
3	MF	Hajime Hosogai	June 10, 1986 (aged 23)	cm / kg	28	1						
4	DF	Matthew Špiranović	June 27, 1988 (aged 21)	cm / kg	13	1						
5	MF	Wilfried Sanou	March 16, 1984 (aged 25)	cm / kg	26	2						
6	DF	Nobuhisa Yamada	September 10, 1975 (aged 34)	cm / kg	27	0						
7	MF	Tsukasa Umesaki	February 23, 1987 (aged 23)	cm / kg	2	0						
8	MF	Yosuke Kashiwagi	December 15, 1987 (aged 22)	cm / kg	34	4						
10	MF	Robson Ponte	November 6, 1976 (aged 33)	cm / kg	29	9						
11	FW	Tatsuya Tanaka	November 27, 1982 (aged 27)	cm / kg	22	2						
12	DF	Shunsuke Tsutsumi	June 8, 1987 (aged 22)	cm / kg	1	0						
13	MF	Keita Suzuki	July 8, 1981 (aged 28)	cm / kg	17	0						
14	DF	Tadaaki Hirakawa	May 1, 1979 (aged 30)	cm / kg	26	0						
15	FW	Sergio Escudero	September 1, 1988 (aged 21)	cm / kg	17	3						
16	FW	Hiroyuki Takasaki	March 17, 1986 (aged 23)	cm / kg	5	1						
17	FW	Edmilson	September 15, 1982 (aged 27)	cm / kg	34	16						
18	GK	Nobuhiro Kato	December 11, 1984 (aged 25)	cm / kg	0	0						
19	FW	Naohiro Takahara	June 4, 1979 (aged 30)	cm / kg	4	0						
20	DF	Satoshi Horinouchi	October 26, 1979 (aged 30)	cm / kg	20	1						
21	DF	Takuya Nagata	September 8, 1990 (aged 19)	cm / kg	0	0						
22	MF	Yuki Abe	September 6, 1981 (aged 28)	cm / kg	20	3						
23	GK	Ryōta Tsuzuki	April 18, 1978 (aged 31)	cm / kg	0	0						
24	FW	Genki Haraguchi	May 9, 1991 (aged 18)	cm / kg	26	2						
26	DF	Mizuki Hamada	May 18, 1990 (aged 19)	cm / kg	4	0						
27	DF	Yoshiya Nishizawa	June 13, 1987 (aged 22)	cm / kg	0	0						
29	GK	Koki Otani	April 8, 1989 (aged 20)	cm / kg	0	0						
30	FW	Faisal Mohammed	May 7, 1991 (aged 18)	cm / kg	0	0						
31	DF	Takuya Okamoto	June 18, 1992 (aged 17)	cm / kg	9	0						
32	MF	Yusuke Hayashi	January 23, 1990 (aged 20)	cm / kg	1	0						
33	MF	Shunki Takahashi	May 4, 1990 (aged 19)	cm / kg	14	0						
34	MF	Naoki Yamada	July 4, 1990 (aged 19)	cm / kg	3	0						
35	MF	Tomoya Ugajin	March 23, 1988 (aged 21)	cm / kg	26	2						

== Other pages ==
- (in Japanese) J. League official site
