= 2008 Urawa Red Diamonds season =

Urawa Red Diamonds
2008 season
- Manager: Holger Osieck (until 16 March 2008); Gert Engels (from 16 March 2008)
- Stadium: Saitama Stadium 2002
- J. League 1: 7th
- Emperor's Cup: Fifth round
- J. League Cup: Group stage
- Top goalscorer: Marcus Tulio Tanaka (11); Edmilson (11)
Home colours	Away colours

During the 2008 season, Urawa Red Diamonds competed in the J. League 1, the top tier of Japanese football, in which they finished 7th. The club also competed in two domestic cup competitions, the Emperor's Cup and the J. League Cup, being eliminated in the fifth round of the former, and at the group stage in the latter competition.

Manager Holger Osieck was sacked two matches into Urawa's J1 League campaign on 16 March 2008, and was succeeded by Gert Engels.

== Competitions ==
Competitions	Position
J. League 1	7th / 18 clubs
Emperor's Cup	5th Round
J. League Cup	GL-A 4th / 4 clubs

=== J. League 1 ===
==== League table ====
Pos	Team	Pld	W	D	L	GF	GA	GD	Pts	Qualification or relegation
5	Shimizu S-Pulse	34	16	7	11	50	42	+8	55	
6	FC Tokyo	34	16	7	11	50	46	+4	55	
7	Urawa Red Diamonds	34	15	8	11	50	42	+8	53	
8	Gamba Osaka	34	14	8	12	46	49	−3	50	Qualification for 2009 AFC Champions League Group stage (Note: Qualified as the winner of 2008 Emperor's Cup.)
9	Yokohama F. Marinos	34	13	9	12	43	32	+11	48	

Updated to match(es) played on December 6, 2008. Source: J. League Division 1
Rules for classification: 1) points; 2) goal difference; 3) number of goals scored.

==== Results ====
J.League Division 1 results
Date	Time	Opponent	Venue	Result F–A	Attendance
8 March 2008	14:05	Yokohama F. Marinos	A	0–1	61,246
15 March 2008	14:04	Nagoya Grampus	H	0–2	54,482
30 March 2008	16:03	Albirex Niigata	H	3–0	46,962
2 April 2008	19:03	Shimizu S-Pulse	A	2–1	15,223
5 April 2008	13:04	Júbilo Iwata	A	2–1	27,866
13 April 2008	16:04	Kashima Antlers	H	2–0	54,450
20 April 2008	14:01	Omiya Ardija	H	0–0	50,997
26 April 2008	16:04	Kyoto Sanga	A	4–0	19,680
29 April 2008	16:00	Consadole Sapporo	H	4–2	48,031
3 May 2008	19:04	Vissel Kobe	A	1–1	23,088
6 May 2008	16:00	JEF United Chiba	H	3–0	52,008
10 May 2008	14:05	Kawasaki Frontale	A	1–0	20,335
17 May 2008	14:04	Gamba Osaka	H	2–3	57,050
28 June 2008	19:03	Kashiwa Reysol	A	1–2	36,785
5 July 2008	19:04	FC Tokyo	H	2–0	49,218
12 July 2008	18:05	Oita Trinita	A	0–2	28,214
17 July 2008	19:31	Tokyo Verdy	H	3–2	35,080
21 July 2008	18:01	Kawasaki Frontale	H	1–3	51,168
27 July 2008	18:34	Kashima Antlers	A	1–1	36,412
9 August 2008	19:34	Kashiwa Reysol	H	2–2	46,981
16 August 2008	18:34	FC Tokyo	A	1–0	37,154
23 August 2008	18:34	Júbilo Iwata	H	3–1	45,253
27 August 2008	19:03	Tokyo Verdy	A	1–1	26,275
13 September 2008	14:04	Oita Trinita	H	0–0	45,831
21 September 2008	18:00	Omiya Ardija	A	1–0	11,530
28 September 2008	19:03	Nagoya Grampus	A	1–1	19,811
1 October 2008	19:01	Kyoto Sanga	H (Note: Match played at Urawa Komaba Stadium.)	2–2	16,225
5 October 2008	14:05	JEF United Chiba	A	2–3	16,718
18 October 2008	15:01	Vissel Kobe	H	0–1	47,325
26 October 2008	14:04	Albirex Niigata	A	1–0	40,359
8 November 2008	14:04	Consadole Sapporo	A	2–1	28,901
23 November 2008	13:01	Shimizu S-Pulse	H	1–2	54,709
29 November 2008	14:03	Gamba Osaka	A	0–1	19,605
6 December 2008	14:31	Yokohama F. Marinos	H	1–6	53,583

=== Emperor's Cup ===
Emperor's Cup results
Round	Date	Time	Opponent	Venue	Result	Scorers	Ref.
Fourth round	3 November 2008	13:00	Ehime FC	H	1–0 (a.e.t.)	Ponte 95'	
Fifth round	15 November 2008	13:00	Yokohama F. Marinos	N	2–2 (a.e.t.) (5–6 p)	Escudero 43', Horinouchi 46'	

=== J. League Cup ===
Team	Pld	W	D	L	GF	GA	GD	Pts
Nagoya Grampus	6	5	0	1	14	5	+9	15
Vissel Kobe	6	3	1	2	5	5	0	10
Kyoto Sanga FC	6	1	3	2	7	8	−1	6
Urawa Red Diamonds	6	0	2	4	8	16	−8	2

J. League Cup results
Match	Date	Time	Opponent	Venue	Result	Attendance
GL-A-1	20 March 2008	16:00	Vissel Kobe	H	0–1	33,392
GL-A-2	23 March 2008	17:00	Kyoto Sanga	A	3–3	13,332
GL-A-3	16 April 2008	19:00	Kyoto Sanga	H	1–1	15,973
GL-A-4	25 May 2008	19:00	Nagoya Grampus	A	2–4	21,015
GL-A-5	31 May 2008	19:00	Vissel Kobe	A	1–2	17,453
GL-A-6	8 June 2008	15:00	Nagoya Grampus	H	1–5	35,417

== Player statistics ==
No.	Pos.	Player	D.o.B. (Age)	Height / Weight	J. League 1		Emperor's Cup		J. League Cup		Total	
No.	Pos.	Player	D.o.B. (Age)	Height / Weight	Apps	Goals	Apps	Goals	Apps	Goals	Apps	Goals
1	GK	Norihiro Yamagishi	17 May 1978 (aged 29)	cm / kg	1	0						
2	DF	Keisuke Tsuboi	16 September 1979 (aged 28)	cm / kg	21	0						
3	MF	Hajime Hosogai	10 June 1986 (aged 21)	cm / kg	26	2						
4	DF	Marcus Tulio Tanaka	24 April 1981 (aged 26)	cm / kg	31	11						
6	DF	Nobuhisa Yamada	10 September 1975 (aged 32)	cm / kg	28	0						
7	FW	Naohiro Takahara	4 June 1979 (aged 28)	cm / kg	27	6						
8	MF	Alessandro Santos	20 July 1977 (aged 30)	cm / kg	1	0						
9	FW	Yuichiro Nagai	14 February 1979 (aged 29)	cm / kg	26	5						
10	MF	Robson Ponte	6 November 1976 (aged 31)	cm / kg	16	1						
11	FW	Tatsuya Tanaka	27 November 1982 (aged 25)	cm / kg	15	2						
12	DF	Shunsuke Tsutsumi	8 June 1987 (aged 20)	cm / kg	18	0						
13	MF	Keita Suzuki	8 July 1981 (aged 26)	cm / kg	23	0						
14	DF	Tadaaki Hirakawa	1 May 1979 (aged 28)	cm / kg	31	1						
15	FW	Sergio Escudero	1 September 1988 (aged 19)	cm / kg	13	0						
16	MF	Takahito Soma	10 December 1981 (aged 26)	cm / kg	27	3						
17	FW	Edmilson	15 September 1982 (aged 25)	cm / kg	31	11						
18	FW	Junki Koike	11 May 1987 (aged 20)	cm / kg	0	0						
19	DF	Hideki Uchidate	15 January 1974 (aged 34)	cm / kg	3	0						
20	DF	Satoshi Horinouchi	26 October 1979 (aged 28)	cm / kg	28	0						
21	MF	Tsukasa Umesaki	23 February 1987 (aged 21)	cm / kg	22	1						
22	MF	Yuki Abe	6 September 1981 (aged 26)	cm / kg	33	6						
23	GK	Ryōta Tsuzuki	18 April 1978 (aged 29)	cm / kg	33	0						
24	DF	Kazuya Sakamoto	2 September 1987 (aged 20)	cm / kg	0	0						
25	DF	Tetsushi Kondo	4 November 1986 (aged 21)	cm / kg	0	0						
26	FW	Hiroyuki Takasaki	17 March 1986 (aged 21)	cm / kg	2	0						
27	DF	Yoshiya Nishizawa	13 June 1987 (aged 20)	cm / kg	0	0						
28	GK	Nobuhiro Kato	11 December 1984 (aged 23)	cm / kg	0	0						
29	GK	Koki Otani	8 April 1989 (aged 18)	cm / kg	0	0						
30	FW	Masayuki Okano	25 July 1972 (aged 35)	cm / kg	4	0						
31	DF	Masato Hashimoto	12 October 1989 (aged 18)	cm / kg	0	0						
32	MF	Yusuke Hayashi	23 January 1990 (aged 18)	cm / kg	0	0						
34	MF	Naoki Yamada	4 July 1990 (aged 17)	cm / kg	1	0						
35	FW	Genki Haraguchi	9 May 1991 (aged 16)	cm / kg	0	0						
