= 2007 Urawa Red Diamonds season =

Urawa Red Diamonds
2007 season
- Manager: Holger Osieck
- Stadium: Saitama Stadium 2002
- J.League 1: Runners-up
- Emperor's Cup: Fourth round
- J.League Cup: Quarterfinals
- Japanese Super Cup: Runners-up
- A3 Champions Cup: 3rd place
- AFC Champions League: Champions
- FIFA Club World Cup: 3rd place
- Top goalscorer: League: Washington (16); All: Washington (20)
- Highest home attendance: 62,123
- Lowest home attendance: 16,709
- Average home league attendance: 46,667
Home colours	Away colours

During the 2007 season, Urawa Red Diamonds competed in the J. League 1, the top tier of Japanese football, in which they finished as runners-up. The club also competed in two domestic cup competitions, the Emperor's Cup and the J. League Cup, being eliminated in the fourth round of the former, and at the quarter-final stage in the latter competition. The club also competed in the 2007 Japanese Super Cup but lost 4–0 to Gamba Osaka.

In addition to domestic competitions, Urawa competed in the AFC Champions League, winning the competition for the first time, and subsequently took part in the FIFA Club World Cup, in which they finished 3rd.

== Competitions ==
Competitions	Position
J.League 1	Runners-up / 18 clubs
Emperor's Cup	4th Round
J.League Cup	Quarterfinals
2007 Japanese Super Cup	Runners-up
A3 Champions Cup	3rd Place
AFC Champions League	Champions
FIFA Club World Cup	3rd Place

== Domestic results ==
=== J.League 1 ===
==== League table ====
Pos	Team	Pld	W	D	L	GF	GA	GD	Pts	Qualification or relegation
1	Kashima Antlers (C)	34	22	6	6	60	36	+24	72	2008 AFC Champions League Group Stage
2	Urawa Red Diamonds	34	20	10	4	55	28	+27	70	2008 AFC Champions League Knockout Stage
3	Gamba Osaka	34	19	10	5	71	37	+34	67	2008 AFC Champions League Group Stage (Note: Urawa Red Diamonds won the 2006 Emperor's Cup and have already qualified for AFC Champions League. Since Urawa takes the extra spot as the defending 2007 ACL champion; therefore Gamba Osaka received the third ACL spot as the third place team of the league.) (Note: Gamba Osaka qualifies to Pan-Pacific Championship as the Nabisco Cup winner.)
4	Shimizu S-Pulse	34	18	7	9	53	36	+17	61	
5	Kawasaki Frontale	34	14	12	8	66	48	+18	54	

Updated to match(es) played on December 1, 2007. Source: J. League Division 1
Rules for classification: 1) points; 2) goal difference; 3) number of goals scored.
(C) Champions

==== Results ====
Match	Date	Venue	Opponents	Score
1	2007.03.03	Saitama Stadium 2002	Yokohama FC	2–1
2	2007.03.11	Tohoku Denryoku Big Swan Stadium	Albirex Niigata	2–2
3	2007.03.17	Saitama Stadium 2002	Ventforet Kofu	2–0
4	2007.04.01	Ōita Stadium	Ōita Trinita	2–2
5	2007.04.07	Saitama Stadium 2002	Júbilo Iwata	2–1
6	2007.04.15	Hitachi Kashiwa Stadium	Kashiwa Reysol	2–0
7	2007.04.21	Saitama Stadium 2002	Kawasaki Frontale	1–2
8	2007.04.29	Kashima Soccer Stadium	Kashima Antlers	1–0
9	2007.05.03	Saitama Stadium 2002	JEF United	1–1
10	2007.05.06	Omiya Stadium	Omiya Ardija	1–1
11	2007.05.13	Saitama Stadium 2002	Gamba Osaka	1–1
12	2007.05.19	Toyota Stadium	Nagoya Grampus	2–1
13	2007.05.27	Saitama Stadium 2002	Yokohama Marinos	1–1
14	2007.08.01	Saitama Stadium 2002	Sanfrecce Hiroshima	4–1
15	2007.06.17	Ajinomoto Stadium	FC Tokyo	2–0
16	2007.06.20	Saitama Stadium 2002	Vissel Kobe	2–0
17	2007.06.23	Nihondaira Stadium	Shimizu S-Pulse	1–0
18	2007.06.30	Yamaha Stadium	Júbilo Iwata	2–0
19	2007.08.11	Saitama Stadium 2002	Kashiwa Reysol	1–1
20	2007.08.15	Osaka Expo '70 Stadium	Gamba Osaka	1–0
21	2007.08.18	Kose Sports Stadium	Ventforet Kofu	4–1
22	2007.08.25	Saitama Stadium 2002	FC Tokyo	3–2
23	2007.08.29	Kobe Wing Stadium	Vissel Kobe	2–1
24	2007.09.01	Saitama Stadium 2002	Omiya Ardija	0–1
25	2007.09.15	Hiroshima Big Arch Stadium	Sanfrecce Hiroshima	4–2
26	2007.09.22	Nissan Stadium	Yokohama Marinos	1–0
27	2007.09.30	Saitama Stadium 2002	Albirex Niigata	1–0
28	2007.10.07	Saitama Stadium 2002	Ōita Trinita	2–1
29	2007.10.20	Fukuda Denshi Arena	JEF United	4–2
30	2007.10.28	Saitama Stadium 2002	Nagoya Grampus	0–0
31	2007.11.11	Todoroki Athletics Stadium	Kawasaki Frontale	1–1
32	2007.11.18	Saitama Stadium 2002	Shimizu S-Pulse	0–0
33	2007.11.24	Saitama Stadium 2002	Kashima Antlers	0–1
34	2007.12.01	Mitsuzawa Stadium	Yokohama FC	0–1

=== Emperor's Cup ===
Match	Date	Venue	Opponents	Score
4th Round	2007.11.28	Urawa Komaba Stadium	Ehime F.C.	0–2

=== J.League Cup ===
Match	Date	Venue	Opponents	Score
Quarterfinals-1	2007.07.07	Saitama Stadium	Gamba Osaka	1–1
Quarterfinals-2	2007.07.14	Osaka Expo '70 Stadium	Gamba Osaka	2–5

=== Japanese Super Cup ===
Match	Date	Venue	Opponents	Score
Final	2007.02.24	Tokyo National Stadium	Gamba Osaka	0–4

=== A3 Champions Cup ===
Match	Date	Venue	Opponents	Score
1	2007.06.07	Shandong Stadium	Shandong Luneng Football Club	3–4
2	2007.06.10	Shandong Stadium	Seongnam Ilhwa Chunma	1–0
3	2007.06.13	Shandong Stadium	Shanghai Shenhua	1–3

=== AFC Champions League ===
Match	Date	Venue	Opponents	Score
Group stage	2007.03.07	Saitama Stadium	Persik Kediri	3–0
Group stage	2007.03.21	Sydney Football Stadium	Sydney FC	2–2
Group stage	2007.04.11	Saitama Stadium	Shanghai Shenhua	1–0
Group stage	2007.04.25	Yuanshen Stadium	Shanghai Shenhua	0–0
Group stage	2007.05.09	Manahan Stadium	Persik Kediri	3–3
Group stage	2007.05.23	Saitama Stadium	Sydney FC	0–0
Quarterfinals-1	2007.09.19	Saitama Stadium	Jeonbuk Hyundai Motors	2–1
Quarterfinals-2	2007.09.26	Jeonju World Cup Stadium	Jeonbuk Hyundai Motors	2–0
Semifinals-1	2007.10.03	Seongnam 2 Stadium	Seongnam Ilhwa Chunma	2–2
Semifinals-2	2007.10.24	Saitama Stadium	Seongnam Ilhwa Chunma	2–2 aet (5–3p)
Final-1	2007.11.07	Foolad Shahr Stadium	Sepahan F.C.	1–1
Final-2	2007.11.14	Saitama Stadium	Sepahan F.C.	2–0

=== FIFA Club World Cup ===
Match	Date	Venue	Opponents	Score
Quarterfinals	2007.12.10	Toyota Stadium	Sepahan F.C.	3–1
Semifinals	2007.12.13	Nissan Stadium	A.C. Milan	0–1
Third place Match	2007.12.16	Nissan Stadium	Étoile du Sahel	2–2 (4–2p)

== Player statistics ==
No.	Pos.	Player	D.o.B. (Age)	Height / Weight	J.League 1		Emperor's Cup		J.League Cup		Total	
No.	Pos.	Player	D.o.B. (Age)	Height / Weight	Apps	Goals	Apps	Goals	Apps	Goals	Apps	Goals
1	GK	Norihiro Yamagishi	17 May 1978 (aged 28)	cm / kg	1	0						
2	DF	Keisuke Tsuboi	16 September 1979 (aged 27)	1,80 cm / kg	31	0						
3	MF	Hajime Hosogai	10 June 1986 (aged 20)	1,73cm / kg	8	0						
4	DF	Marcus Tulio Tanaka	24 April 1981 (aged 25)	cm 1,85/ kg	26	3						
5	DF	Nenê	6 June 1975 (aged 31)	cm / kg	12	2						
6	DF	Nobuhisa Yamada	10 September 1975 (aged 31)	cm / kg	29	0						
7	MF	Tomoyuki Sakai	29 June 1979 (aged 27)	cm / kg	0	0						
8	MF	Shinji Ono	27 September 1979 (aged 27)	cm / kg	25	3						
9	FW	Yuichiro Nagai	14 February 1979 (aged 28)	cm / kg	31	6						
10	MF	Robson Ponte	6 November 1976 (aged 30)	cm / kg	33	7						
11	FW	Tatsuya Tanaka	27 November 1982 (aged 24)	cm / kg	18	9						
12	DF	Shunsuke Tsutsumi	8 June 1987 (aged 19)	cm / kg	0	0						
13	MF	Keita Suzuki	8 July 1981 (aged 25)	cm / kg	33	1						
14	DF	Tadaaki Hirakawa	1 May 1979 (aged 27)	cm / kg	19	0						
15	FW	Sergio Escudero	1 September 1988 (aged 18)	cm / kg	1	0						
16	MF	Takahito Soma	10 December 1981 (aged 25)	cm / kg	13	0						
17	MF	Makoto Hasebe	18 January 1984 (aged 23)	cm / kg	31	1						
18	FW	Junki Koike	11 May 1987 (aged 19)	cm / kg	4	0						
19	DF	Hideki Uchidate	15 January 1974 (aged 33)	cm / kg	11	0						
20	DF	Satoshi Horinouchi	26 October 1979 (aged 27)	cm / kg	19	2						
21	FW	Washington	1 April 1975 (aged 31)	cm / kg	26	16						
22	MF	Yuki Abe	6 September 1981 (aged 25)	cm / kg	33	3						
23	GK	Ryōta Tsuzuki	18 April 1978 (aged 28)	cm / kg	33	0						
24	DF	Kazuya Sakamoto	2 September 1987 (aged 19)	cm / kg	0	0						
25	MF	Takafumi Akahoshi	27 May 1986 (aged 20)	cm / kg	0	0						
26	FW	Yuya Nakamura	14 April 1986 (aged 20)	cm / kg	0	0						
27	DF	Yoshiya Nishizawa	13 June 1987 (aged 19)	cm / kg	0	0						
28	GK	Nobuhiro Kato	11 December 1984 (aged 22)	cm / kg	0	0						
29	GK	Koki Otani	8 April 1989 (aged 17)	1,87cm / kg	0	0						
30	FW	Masayuki Okano	25 July 1972 (aged 34)	1,80cm / kg	11	0						

== Other pages ==
- (in Japanese) J.League official site
