= 2005 Emperor's Cup final =

2005 Emperor's Cup Final
| Urawa Reds | Shimizu S-Pulse |
| 2 | 1 |
- Date: January 1, 2006
- Venue: National Stadium, Tokyo

2005 Emperor's Cup Final was the 85th final of the Emperor's Cup competition. The final was played at National Stadium in Tokyo on January 1, 2006. Urawa Reds won the championship.

== Match details ==
January 1, 2006

| Urawa Reds | 2–1 | Shimizu S-Pulse |
|---|---|---|
| Satoshi Horinouchi 39'; Maric 73' | | Daisuke Ichikawa 76' |

National Stadium

Urawa Reds
| GK | 23 | (Japan) Ryota Tsuzuki |
| DF | 2 | (Japan) Keisuke Tsuboi |
| DF | 20 | (Japan) Satoshi Horinouchi |
| DF | 32 | (Japan) Hajime Hosogai |
| MF | 6 | (Japan) Nobuhisa Yamada |
| MF | 17 | (Japan) Makoto Hasebe |
| MF | 7 | (Japan) Tomoyuki Sakai |
| MF | 8 | (Japan) Alessandro Santos |
| MF | 10 | (Brazil) Ponte |
| FW | 30 | (Japan) Masayuki Okano | (substituted off) 65' |
| FW | 18 | (Croatia) Maric |
Substitutes:
| GK | 1 | (Japan) Norihiro Yamagishi |
| DF | 26 | (Japan) Yuzo Minami |
| MF | 25 | (Japan) Takafumi Akahoshi | (substituted on) 65' |
| FW | 9 | (Japan) Yuichiro Nagai |
| FW | 27 | (Japan) Takuya Yokoyama |
Manager:
(Germany) Buchwald

Shimizu S-Pulse
| GK | 21 | (Japan) Yohei Nishibe |
| DF | 11 | (Japan) Ryuzo Morioka | (substituted off) 72' |
| DF | 26 | (Japan) Naoaki Aoyama |
| DF | 4 | (Japan) Kazumichi Takagi |
| DF | 3 | (Japan) Takahiro Yamanishi |
| MF | 16 | (South Korea) Choi Tae-uk | (substituted off) 80' |
| MF | 32 | (Japan) Takuma Edamura | (substituted off) 72' |
| MF | 7 | (Japan) Teruyoshi Ito |
| MF | 13 | (Japan) Akihiro Hyodo |
| FW | 23 | (Japan) Shinji Okazaki |
| FW | 18 | (South Korea) Cho Jae-jin |
Substitutes:
| GK | 1 | (Japan) Takaya Kurokawa |
| DF | 25 | (Japan) Daisuke Ichikawa | (substituted on) 72' |
| MF | 8 | (Japan) Kohei Hiramatsu | (substituted on) 72' |
| MF | 14 | (Japan) Jumpei Takaki |
| FW | 9 | (Japan) Hideaki Kitajima | (substituted on) 80' |
Manager:
(Japan) Kenta Hasegawa

== See also ==
- 2005 Emperor's Cup
