= Satoshi Horinouchi =

Japanese footballer (born 1979)

Satoshi Horinouchi 堀之内 聖
Personal information
- Full name: Satoshi Horinouchi
- Date of birth: October 26, 1979 (age 47)
- Place of birth: Saitama, Saitama, Japan
- Height: 1.78 m (5 ft 10 in)
- Position: Defender

Youth career
- 1995–1997: Saitama Urawa High School
- 1998–2001: Tokyo Gakugei University

Senior career*
Years	Team	Apps	(Gls)
2002–2011	Urawa Reds	148	(7)
2012	Yokohama FC	22	(2)
2013	Montedio Yamagata	30	(3)
Total		200	(12)
Medal record
Urawa Reds
Winner	AFC Champions League	2007
Winner	J1 League	2006
Runner-up	J1 League	2004
Runner-up	J1 League	2005
Runner-up	J1 League	2007
Winner	J.League Cup	2003
Runner-up	J.League Cup	2002
Runner-up	J.League Cup	2004
Runner-up	J.League Cup	2011
Winner	Emperor's Cup	2005
Winner	Emperor's Cup	2006
- * Club domestic league appearances and goals

Satoshi Horinouchi (堀之内 聖, Horinouchi Satoshi; born October 26, 1979) is a former Japanese football player.

== Playing career ==
Horinouchi was born in Saitama on October 26, 1979. After graduating from Tokyo Gakugei University, he joined the J1 League club Urawa Reds in 2002. He got an opportunity to play in 2003 and he played many matches as stopper in a three-backs defense from 2005. The Reds won the championship at the 2005 Emperor's Cup. At the Emperor's Cup Final, he scored the opening goal. In 2006, he became a regular player as left defender of a three-back defense with Keisuke Tsuboi and Marcus Tulio Tanaka and the Reds won the championship of the J1 League for the first time in the club's history. In 2007, the Reds won the championship of the AFC Champions League. Although he did not play as much in 2009, he played many matches as defensive midfielder. However he did not play at all in 2011. In 2012, he moved to the J2 League club Yokohama FC. Although he did not play much during the summer, he played as center back after that. In 2013, he moved to the J2 club Montedio Yamagata. He played many matches as center back. He retired at the end of the 2013 season.

== Club statistics ==
Club	Season	League		Emperor's Cup		J.League Cup		AFC		Other^{*}		Total	
Club	Season	Apps	Goals	Apps	Goals	Apps	Goals	Apps	Goals	Apps	Goals	Apps	Goals
Urawa Reds	2002	0	0	0	0	0	0	-		-		0	0
Urawa Reds	2003	6	0	0	0	2	0	-		-		8	0
Urawa Reds	2004	9	0	3	0	3	0	-		-		15	0
Urawa Reds	2005	23	3	5	2	9	0	-		-		37	5
Urawa Reds	2006	28	1	3	0	8	1	-		1	1	40	3
Urawa Reds	2007	19	2	0	0	2	0	7	0	2	0	30	2
Urawa Reds	2008	28	0	2	1	6	0	3	0	-		39	1
Urawa Reds	2009	15	0	1	0	5	0	-		-		21	0
Urawa Reds	2010	20	1	3	0	4	0	-		-		27	1
Urawa Reds	2011	0	0	0	0	0	0	-		-		0	0
Yokohama FC	2012	22	2	1	0	-		-		1	0	24	2
Montedio Yamagata	2013	30	3	2	0	-		-		-		32	3
Career total		200	12	20	3	39	1	10	0	4	1	273	17

^{*}Includes other competitive competitions, including the Japanese Super Cup, A3 Champions Cup and J1 Promotion Play-offs.

== Awards and honours ==
=== Club ===
Urawa Reds

- AFC Champions League: 1

2007

- J1 League: 1

2006

- Emperor's Cup: 2

2005, 2006

- J.League Cup: 1

2003

- Japanese Super Cup: 1

2006
