= Nenê (footballer, born 1975) =

Brazilian footballer

Personal information
- Full name: Fábio Camilo de Brito
- Date of birth: 6 June 1975 (age 51)
- Place of birth: São Paulo, Brazil
- Height: 1.83 m (6 ft 0 in)
- Position: Centre-back

Team information
- Current team: Corinthians U20 (assistant)

Youth career
- 1991–1992: Bahia
- 1993: Fluminense
- 1994: Bahia

Senior career*
Years	Team	Apps	(Gls)
1995–1996	Juventus-SP	35	(5)
1996–1997	Guarani	24	(2)
1997–1998	Sporting CP	4	(0)
1998	→ Bahia (loan)		
1999	Corinthians	34	(6)
2000–2001	Grêmio	44	(1)
2002–2003	Hertha BSC	10	(0)
2003–2004	Vitória	28	(2)
2004–2007	Urawa Reds	41	(4)
2008	Coritiba	15	(0)
2009	Juventude	15	(1)
2010	Bragantino	3	(0)
2011	Grêmio Osasco	11	(1)
2011–2012	União Mogi		

Managerial career
- 2018: Taboão da Serra (assistant)
- 2020: Taboão da Serra U20 (assistant)
- 2024–: Corinthians U20 (assistant)
- * Club domestic league appearances and goals

Fábio Camilo de Brito (born 6 June 1975 in São Paulo), commonly known as "Nenê", is a Brazilian football coach and former player who played as a centre-back. He is the current assistant coach of Corinthians' under-20 team.

== Club statistics ==
Appearances and goals by club, season and competition
Club	Season	League			National Cup		League Cup		Continental		Total	
Club	Season	Division	Apps	Goals	Apps	Goals	Apps	Goals	Apps	Goals	Apps	Goals
Juventus	1996	Série C										
Guarani	1997	Série A										
Sporting CP	1997–98	Primeira Divisão	4	0							4	0
Bahia	1998	Série B										
Corinthians Paulista	1999	Série A	24	5							24	5
Grêmio	2000	Série A	26	1							26	1
Grêmio	2001	Série A	12	0							12	0
Grêmio	2002	Série A										
Grêmio	Total											
Hertha BSC	2002–03	Bundesliga	10	0							10	0
Vitória	2003	Série A	15	1							15	1
Vitória	2004	Série A	13	1							13	1
Vitória	Total											
Urawa Reds	2004	J1 League	10	1	3	0	2	0	-		15	1
Urawa Reds	2005	J1 League	10	1	0	0	0	0	-		10	1
Urawa Reds	2006	J1 League	9	0	4	0	0	0	-		13	0
Urawa Reds	2007	J1 League	12	2	1	0	0	0	5	0	18	2
Urawa Reds	Total		41	4	8	0	2	0	5	0	55	4
Coritiba	2008	Série A										
Coritiba	2009	Série A										
Coritiba	Total											
Career total			145	12	8	0	2	0	5	0	160	12

== Honours ==
Hertha BSC

- DFB-Ligapokal: 2003

Vitória

- Campeonato Baiano: 2004, 2005

Urawa Reds

- J. League: 2006
- Emperor's Cup: 2006
- AFC Champions League: 2007
