= Matthew Spiranovic =

Australian soccer player

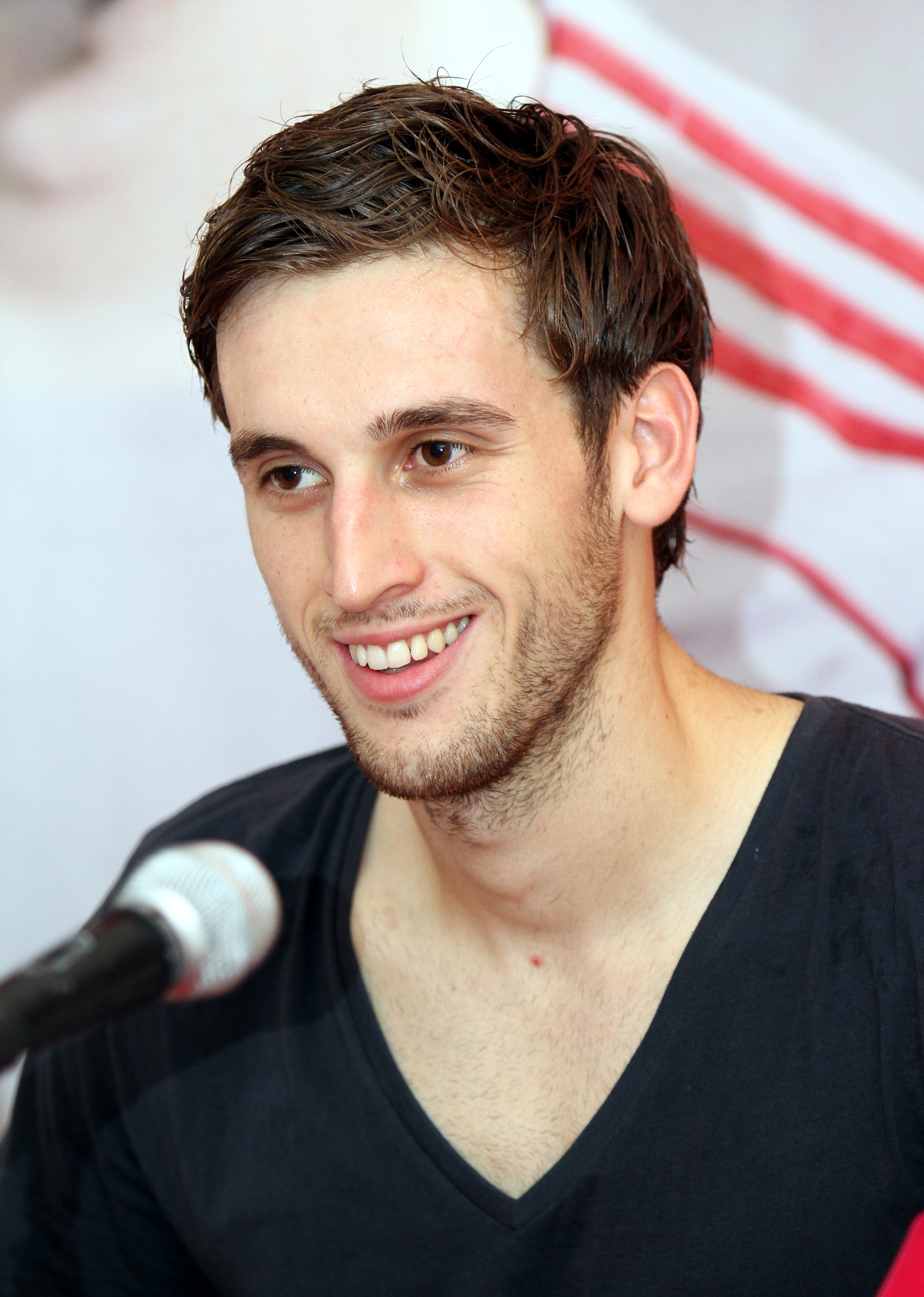
- Spiranovic in 2012

Personal information
- Full name: Matthew Thomas Spiranovic
- Date of birth: 27 June 1988 (age 38)
- Place of birth: Geelong, Victoria, Australia
- Height: 1.88 m (6 ft 2 in)
- Position: Defender

Youth career
- North Geelong Warriors
- Keilor Park
- Melbourne Knights
- 2004–2005: VIS
- 2006: AIS
- 2007: 1. FC Nürnberg

Senior career*
Years	Team	Apps	(Gls)
2004	North Geelong Warriors		(1)
2005	Melbourne Victory	0	(0)
2007–2011	1. FC Nürnberg	24	(0)
2009	1. FC Nürnberg II	13	(2)
2010	→ Urawa Red Diamonds (loan)	13	(1)
2011–2012	Urawa Red Diamonds	25	(0)
2012–2013	Al-Arabi	13	(2)
2013–2015	Western Sydney Wanderers	31	(1)
2015–2017	Hangzhou Greentown	49	(1)
2018–2019	Perth Glory	15	(0)
2021–2023	Melbourne Victory	17	(0)

International career^{‡}
2004–2005	Australia U17	17	(1)
2006	Australia U20	14	(0)
2007–2008	Australia U23	8	(0)
2008–2019	Australia	36	(0)
Medal record
Representing Australia
Men's Association football
AFC Asian Cup
Winner	2015 Australia
Runner-up	2011 Qatar
- * Club domestic league appearances and goals as of 2 February 2023 ‡ National team caps and goals as of 2 February 2023

Matthew Thomas Spiranovic (born 27 June 1988) is an Australian former soccer player who played as a defender.

Spiranovic started his career with Melbourne Victory, making one competitive appearance before being released with the consent of coach Ernie Merrick to join German Bundesliga club 1. FC Nürnberg. Spiranovic struggled in his new climate with both injuries and form, making just 28 first team appearances over four seasons with the German club, playing more frequently for the club's second side. In search of more consistent playing time, Spiranovic then joined Urawa Red Diamonds making 13 league appearances and scoring 1 goal during the 2010 J-League season. At the end of his loan spell, Spiranovic signed permanently for the club in 2011 for a fee of €450.000.

Spiranovic has made appearances for Australia during the 2010 and 2014 FIFA World Cup qualifiers. He has also represented Australia at the 2005 OFC U-17 Championship, the 2005 FIFA U-17 World Championship, the 2006 AFC Youth Championship, the 2008 Summer Olympics, the 2011 AFC Asian Cup where Australia finished runners-up and the 2015 AFC Asian Cup, in which he was part of the starting line up in the final of the tournament, hosted & won by Australia.

In addition to holding an Australian passport, Spiranovic also has a UK passport.

== Club career ==
=== Early career ===
Spiranovic played junior football in Geelong and Melbourne and had represented his state, Victoria, at U–14 and U–15 Australian national championship level.

==== North Geelong Warriors ====
He had a brief stint with former junior club and Victorian State League Division 2 North-West side North Geelong Warriors, scoring one league goal in a 5–0 home win against Albion Rovers on 5 June 2004.

==== Victorian Institute of Sport ====
In 2004, he earned a scholarship with the Victorian Institute of Sport under coach Ian Greener, and was awarded the Weinstein Medal for best junior player of the year by Football Federation Victoria in 2005. Spiranovic was selected in a 20-man Australia U–17 national team by coach Ange Postecoglou for a five-match tour of Chile against Palestino U–17, Universidad Catolica U–17, Colo-Colo U–17 and Chile U–17. The tour was preparation for the 2005 OFC U-17 Championship. The Qantas U–17 Joeys were then crowned champions of the 2005 OFC U-17 Championship and qualified for the 2005 FIFA U-17 World Championship in Peru, where Spiranovic played in all three group-stage matches of the competition. He was also selected for a Four-Nations tournament in Peru against Costa Rica U–17, Ecuador U–17 and Peru U–17 in July 2005.

==== Australian Institute of Sport ====
In 2006, Spiranovic then graduated to the Australian Institute of Sport where he joined future Socceroo teammates Dario Vidošić, Bruce Djite, Nikita Rukavytsya and Nathan Burns. During his stint at the AIS, Spiranovic received a call up to a 20-man Australia U20 team for a five-match tour of South America in August 2006. Spiranovic participated in matches against Colo-Colo U–20, Universidad de Chile U–20, Chile U–20 and Argentina U–20. The South American tour was preparation for the 2006 AFC Youth Championship, the qualification campaign for the eventual 2007 FIFA U-20 World Cup.

==== Melbourne Victory ====
Having trialled and trained semi-regularly for Melbourne Victory, Spiranovic played as a 16-year-old the club's first friendly match against Oakleigh Cannons in late April in 2005. The friendly match was preparation for Melbourne Victory's first competitive match a few days later, where he again featured for the club in their 2004–05 OFC Club Championship qualifier against Adelaide United on 7 May 2005. Melbourne Victory lost the game 4–1 in a penalty shootout. Ultimately, Spiranovic was not offered a contract by its coach Ernie Merrick for the club's inaugural 2005–06 A-League, as Merrick believed that Spiranovic was too good to play in the A-League. On 5 October 2006, it had been reported in that Spiranovic was signed to 1. FC Nürnberg after training with club's first-team for a week and playing in a friendly against a second division club.

"Ernie (Merrick) not picking me up has done me a favour in a sense because I'll probably be better off in the long run. I trained with Victory for three weeks and Nurnberg for one and the difference is massive. You've got 12 international players at Nurnberg. There's the Czech captain (Tomáš Galásek), Brazilian and Croatian internationals." – Spiranovic on signing with 1. FC Nürnberg

=== 1. FC Nürnberg ===
==== 2006–2011 ====
Spiranovic joined 1. FC Nürnberg in October 2006, where he was handed the number 23 shirt. He debuted in the 2006–07 Bundesliga in a 0–0 away draw against Borussia Mönchengladbach on 30 January 2007, being substituted onto the field for Marek Nikl in the 92nd minute. Days later, Spiranovic made his full debut for 1. FC Nürnberg in a 3–0 home victory against Bayern Munich on 2 February. He was substituted off of the field for Michael Beauchamp in the 46th minute due to a corked thigh. Spiranovic briefly played for 1. FC Nürnberg U-19 in the Under 19 Bundesliga South/Southwest, he debuted in a 2–1 away defeat against Karlsruher SC U-19 on 25 February 2007. Spiranovic scored his first goal for the youth-team in a 5–3 away defeat against 1. FC Kaiserslautern U-19 on 5 April 2007. Spiranovic played his first full 90-minute game in a 1–1 home draw against Wolfsburg on 28 April. He also made two appearances in the 2006–07 DFB-Pokal, his second appearance coming in the 3–2 final victory against Stuttgart on 26 May, where Spiranovic was substituted onto the field for Marek Nikl in the 72nd minute. Winning the DFB-Pokal meant that 1. FC Nürnberg had qualified for the first-round of the 2007–08 UEFA Cup. Spiranovic completed the 2006–07 season having made 8 league appearances.

His first appearance of the 2007–08 Bundesliga came in a 1–0 away defeat against Hamburger SV on 22 September 2007, where Spiranovic had played a full 90-minutes. 1. FC Nürnberg took part in the 2007–08 UEFA Cup. Throughout the tournament, Spiranovic had been included in the team sheet on various occasions but did not make an appearance. Spiranovic made seven league appearances in the 2007–08 season, starting in six games. However, 1. FC Nürnberg had finished in 16th position of the 2007–08 Bundesliga table and were subsequently relegated to the 2. Bundesliga for the 2008–09 season. Spiranovic's first appearance in the 2008–09 2. Bundesliga came in a 2–2 home draw against Alemannia Aachen on 31 August 2008. He played a full 90-minutes of the match. Spiranovic started in the next seven matches until November, where he sustained a long-term hamstring injury and ruptured an ankle tendon and eventually missed the rest of the season. On his return, Spiranovic spent some time with 1. FC Nürnberg II in the Regionalliga Süd whilst regaining his fitness. He debuted for the side in a 4–0 away loss against TSV 1860 München II 24 April 2009. Spiranovic made three appearances for the reserve-team before concluding the season. 1. FC Nürnberg finished in third place of the 2008–09 2. Bundesliga table and faced Energie Cottbus in the relegation playoff. 1. FC Nürnberg won 5–0 on aggregate and were promoted back to the Bundesliga for the 2009–10 season.

In June 2009, tabloid newspaper News of the World reported that Fulham boss Roy Hodgson had offered £1million for Spiranovic, but a transfer was not eventuated. Instead, Spiranovic had his contracted extended for another two seasons with 1. FC Nürnberg. Spiranovic commenced the 2009–10 with the club's reserve side. He scored his first goal for the side in the 81st minute of a 4–1 away victory against Greuther Fürth II on 12 September 2009. Spiranovic made just one Bundesliga league appearance in a 4–0 away defeat against Bayer Leverkusen on 3 October 2009. Spiranovic played a full 90-minutes of the match. He re-joined 1. FC Nürnberg's reserve-team for the remainder of 2009, scoring his second Regionalliga Süd league goal in the 69th minute of a 4–1 away victory against Freiburg II on 29 November 2009. Spiranovic had made eight league appearances in the Regionalliga Süd, starting in each game consecutively. On 17 November 2009, it had been reported that Spiranovic would be loaned out to another club by January 2010 in a bid to gain more game time. It was insisted by 1. FC Nürnberg's sport director Martin Bader that Spiranovic should gain valuable game time as he had missed a large number of games due to injury.

==== Loan to Urawa Red Diamonds ====
===== 2010 season =====
On 7 January 2010, Spiranovic joined Japanese club Urawa Red Diamonds on loan until the end of 2010. His first appearance for Urawa came in a 1–1 home draw against Júbilo Iwata in the 2010 J. League Cup on 31 March. Spiranovic debuted in the 2010 J. League season in a 2–1 home victory against Nagoya Grampus on 5 May, where he was substituted onto the field for Yosuke Kashiwagi in the 89th minute. Spiranovic scored his first league goal for Urawa in the 56th minute of a 4–1 away victory against Shonan Bellmare on 21 August. He scored from a header after receiving the ball from a Tomoya Ugajin cross. Spiranovic had finished the season making 13 league appearances, starting in 7 consecutive games which earned him a call up from Australia's coach, Holger Osieck, for two international friendlies.

=== Urawa Red Diamonds ===
==== 2011 season ====
On 11 December 2010, Spiranovic joined Urawa on a permanent basis after the Japanese club bought out his contract after a very impressive first season in J1 despite frequent injuries. Due to the 2011 Tōhoku earthquake and tsunami in March, Spiranovic returned to Australia as the J-League had been suspended until April 2011. On 22 June 2011, Spiranovic returned from a one-match suspension, due to receiving consecutive yellow cards in two separate games, and played a full game in defence as Urawa Red Diamonds claimed a much-needed 3–0 victory over Avispa Fukuoka. His efforts in defence drew praise from under-pressure Urawa boss Zeljko Petrovic, as Urawa were stuck in mid-table for most of the J-League season. On 15 July, two days after Urawa beat fifth placed side Kawasaki Frontale 2–0 at home, it was published by FourFourTwo Australia that Spiranovic was delighted to finally be enjoying regular injury-free first-team action, however, admitted his frustration by the struggles of his club during the J-League season as Urawa had only recorder just three J-League wins at the time. Spiranovic continued his fine form playing 90 minute games in defence as Urawa would record three wins in the same week. A 2–0 win to Ventforet Kofu on 23 July, a 2–1 J. League Cup win to Montedio Yamagata on 27 July and a 1–0 away victory to Kawasaki Frontale on 30 July ensured Urawa's winning streak in which the side had been undefeated for nine consecutive games.

==== 2012 season ====
In Urawa's first match of the 2012 J. League Cup on 20 March, Spiranovic received his second yellow card, and subsequent red card, in the 81st minute in his side's 1–0 win against Vegalta Sendai. In July 2012, Spiranovic left Japanese outfit for Al-Arabi Sports Club in the Qatar Stars League.

=== Al-Arabi ===
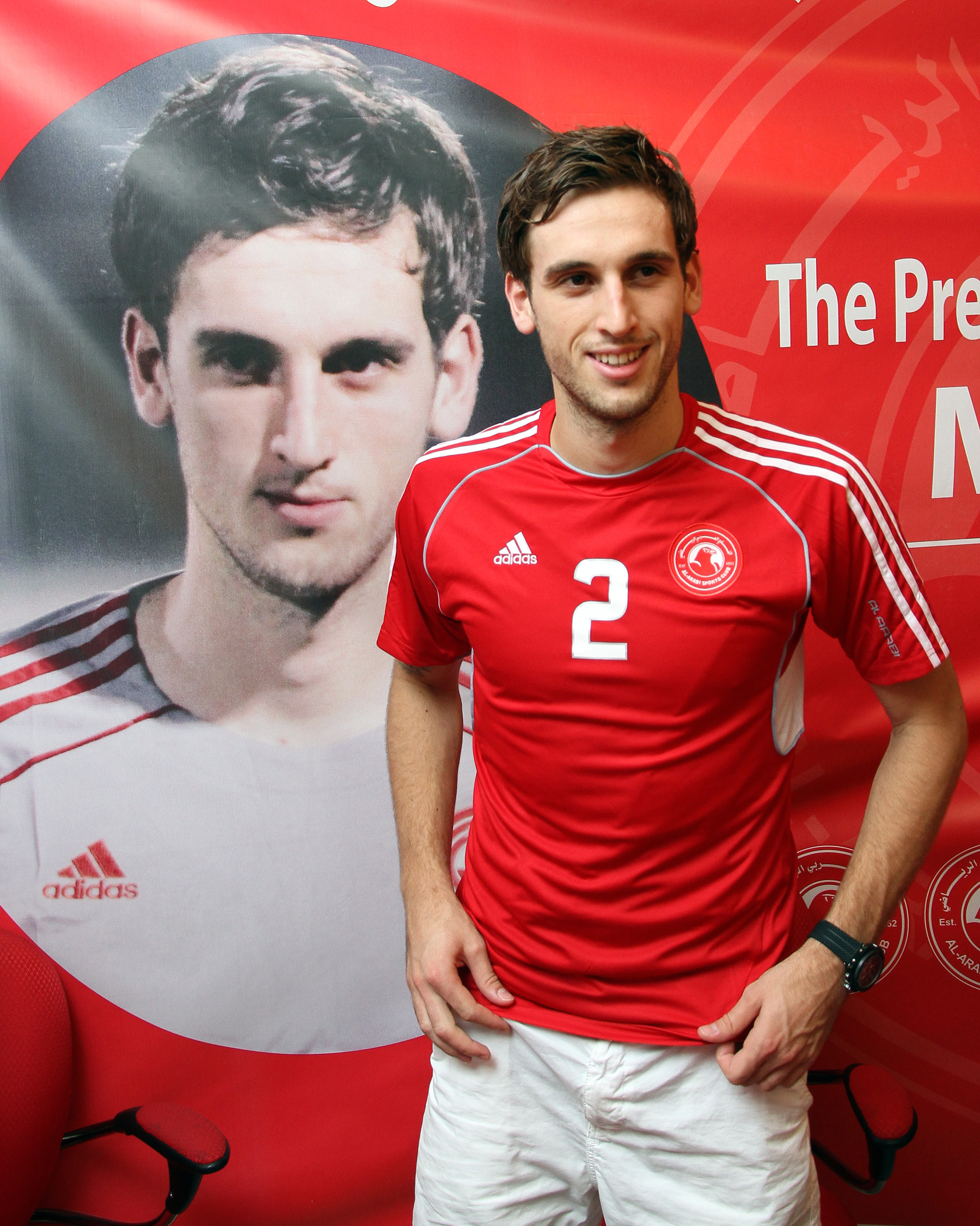
Spiranovic during his signing ceremony with Qatar's Al Arabi Sports Club (2012)

On 9 July 2012, the Qatari club confirmed that they have signed Spiranovic on a two-year deal. It was reported that Spiranovic's lack of game time in Japan had led him to request a transfer. Spiranovic received offers to go back to Europe, most notably in Wales from Brendan Rodgers at Swansea City and then Liverpool, however, he opted for Al Arabi following the lead of Australians Sasa Ognenovski and Mark Bresciano in signing for a Qatari club.

=== Western Sydney Wanderers ===
Spiranovic returned to the A-League in time for the 2013–14 season, signing with Western Sydney Wanderers.

=== Hangzhou Greentown ===
On 16 July 2015, Spiranovic transferred to Chinese Super League side Hangzhou Greentown.

=== Perth Glory ===
On 22 June 2018, Spiranovic signed a one-year contract with Perth Glory, returning to Australia and re-uniting with Tony Popovic who coached him at Western Sydney Wanderers. At the end of his contract, Spiranovic didn't extend his time at Perth Glory and departed the club.

=== Return to Melbourne Victory ===
In July 2021, following two years without playing professional football, Spiranovic returned to Australia joining Melbourne Victory on a one-year contract.

=== Retirement ===
Spiranovic announced his retirement from football, halfway through the A-League season. He suffered from an ongoing foot injury that required surgery, limiting his playing time to just four games out of fourteen played up to the point he retired. His final match was on 21 January 2023, against Perth Glory, one of his former sides, the game finishing 3-1 to Perth.

== International career ==
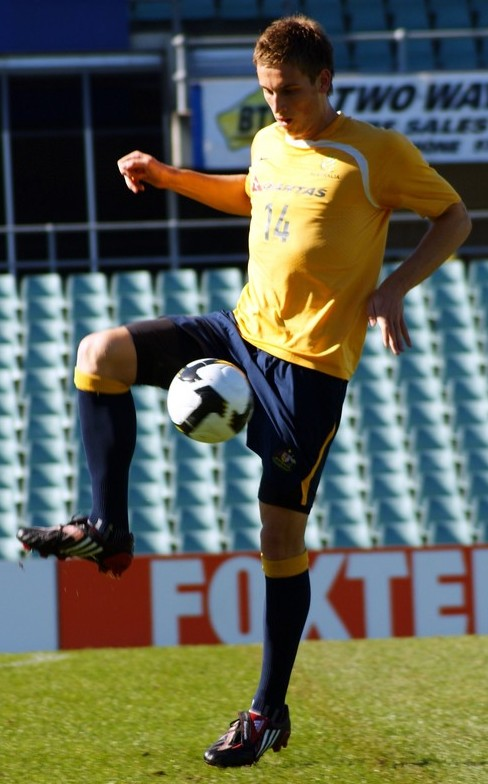
Spiranovic during a Socceroos training session

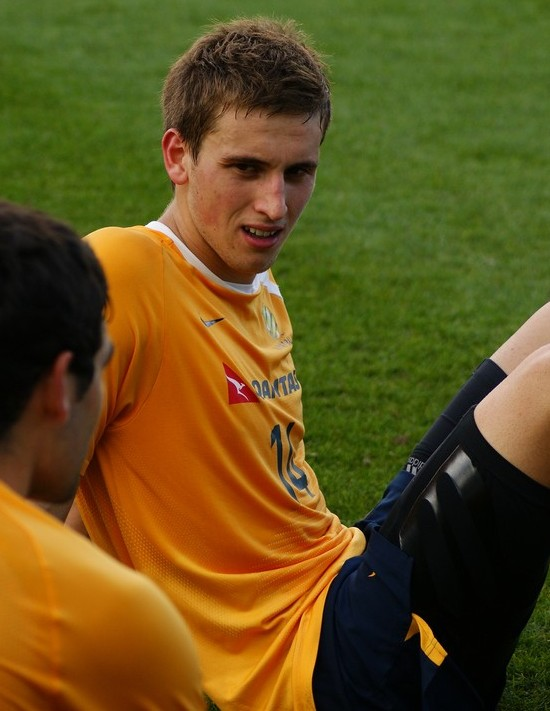
Spiranovic with the Socceroos

=== Socceroos ===
On 5 April 2007, Spiranovic publicly announced his intention to play for Australia on SBS's football program, The World Game. He was called up to the national side for a friendly against Uruguay, which was held on 2 June 2007. Spiranovic did not play in the defeat against the South Americans and surprisingly missed out on a spot in Australia's 2007 Asian Cup Squad, for which only five recognized defenders were selected. Spiranovic made his senior international debut for the Socceroos on 23 May 2008, coming on as a substitute against Ghana, followed by a start in the World Cup Qualifier against China on 22 June 2008. Spiranovic did not make the 2010 FIFA World Cup squad and was transferred to Japanese side Urawa Red Diamonds to gain more playing time. After a lengthy absence from the national team, Spiranovic played a full 90 minutes in a 0–0 draw against Switzerland on 5 September 2010. During this time which had followed Craig Moore's retirement from the national team, Spiranovic was labelled as Australia's central defender for the next decade as coach Holger Osieck noticed his potential before selection for the 2011 Asian Cup.

In 2015 Spiranovic was selected for the 2015 AFC Asian Cup, which was hosted in Australia. Spiranovic played in the final against South Korea, which the Australian side won.

=== 2005 FIFA U-17 World Championship ===
Spiranovic was selected in a 20-man Australia U–17 national team by coach Ange Postecoglou for a five-match tour of Chile against Palestino U–17, Universidad Catolica U–17, Colo-Colo U–17 and Chile U–17. The tour was preparation for the 2005 OFC U-17 Championship. The Qantas U-17 Joeys were then crowned champions of the 2005 OFC U-17 Championship and qualified for the 2005 FIFA U-17 World Championship in Peru. Prior to the 2005 FIFA U-17 World Championship in September 2005, Spiranovic was selected for a Four-Nations tournament in Peru against Costa Rica U–17, Ecuador U–17 and Peru U–17 in July. Spiranovic scored his first international goal during the tournament, in a 2–2 against Peru when with fifteen minutes remaining he had gotten on the end of a placed ball from Joel Allwright to head home powerfully in the 74th minute. Spiranovic was selected in the 20-man squad for the 2005 FIFA U-17 World Championship along with teammates Kaz Patafta, Nathan Burns, Robbie Kruse, Scott Jamieson and Leigh Broxham. He played in all three group-stage matches of the competition and was part of the team's starting–11. Australia finished in third place of their respective group, after losing to Turkey (1–0) and to Mexico (3–0), and winning against Uruguay (2–1).

=== 2006 AFC Youth Championship ===
Spiranovic received a call up to a 20-man Australia U20 team for a five-match tour of South America in August 2006. Spiranovic participated in matches against Colo-Colo U–20, Universidad de Chile U–20, Chile U–20 and Argentina U–20. The South American tour was preparation for the 2006 AFC Youth Championship, the qualification campaign for the eventual 2007 FIFA U-20 World Cup. Spiranovic was selected to play at the 2006 AFC Youth Championship held in India. Australia finished in second spot of their respective group after losing to China (1–0) and defeating Thailand (3–1) and the United Arab Emirates (2–0). Australia advanced to the quarter–finals where they were defeated 2–1 against South Korea and failed to qualify for the 2007 FIFA U-20 World Cup.

=== 2008 Summer Olympics ===
By 2008, he was selected to represent the Australia U23 team at the 2008 Beijing Olympic Games, playing in all three group matches against Serbia, Argentina and Côte d'Ivoire, team finished third in their respective group.

== Personal life ==
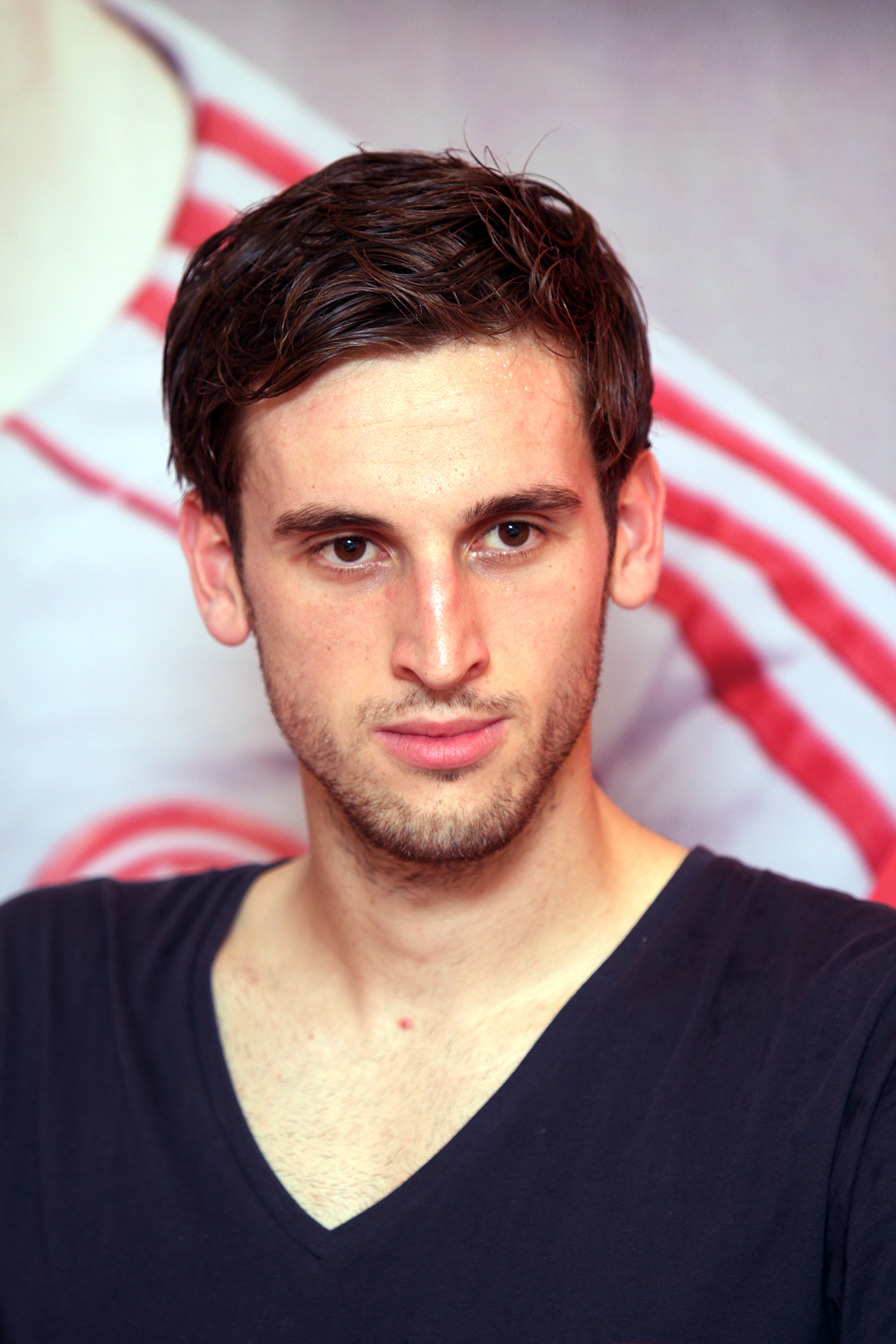
Spiranovic in 2012.

=== Personal and family life ===
Spiranovic was born in Geelong, Victoria. He is the son of Michael Spiranovic, an English born former footballer for North Geelong Warriors. Spiranovic grew up in Geelong's South-West suburb Wandana Heights. He attended St. Robert's Primary School of Geelong and St Joseph's College from 2001 to 2005. Spiranovic has two younger sisters, Amelia, who play for South Melbourne in the Women's Victorian Premier League, and Laura, who plays for ŽNK Split in the Croatian Women's First Football League. He shares a strong friendship with former 1. FC Nürnberg teammate Dario Vidošić, the pair having played together for the Australia U20 team before signing professional terms with the German club. Spiranovic's agent is John Grimaud.

=== National team decision ===
By 2007, it was clear that Spiranovic was to play for Australia when he officially rejected an offer from the Croatian Football Federation. Former Socceroos coach Graham Arnold was informed of Spiranovic's decision by phone and therefore included him in the national side prior to the 2007 Asian Cup and 2010 FIFA World Cup qualifiers. Arnold stated that Football Federation Australia (FFA), as well as the Australian national team's staff, were in danger of losing the defender as Spiranovic's parents received phone calls from Croatia in the middle of the night which applied much pressure on Spiranovic to make his final decision.

== Career statistics ==
=== Club ===
As of 28 October 2017

Club	Season	League^{1}		Cup^{2}		League Cup^{3}		Continental^{4}		Total	
Club	Season	Apps	Goals	Apps	Goals	Apps	Goals	Apps	Goals	Apps	Goals
1. FC Nürnberg	2006–07	8	0	2	0	–		–		10	0
1. FC Nürnberg	2007–08	7	0	0	0	–		1	0	8	0
1. FC Nürnberg	2008–09	8	0	1	0	–		–		9	0
1. FC Nürnberg	2009–10	1	0	0	0	–		–		1	0
1. FC Nürnberg	Total	24	0	3	0	–		1	0	28	0
1. FC Nürnberg II	2007–08	2	0	–		–		–		2	0
1. FC Nürnberg II	2008–09	3	0	–		–		–		3	0
1. FC Nürnberg II	2009–10	8	2	–		–		–		8	2
1. FC Nürnberg II	Total	13	2	–		–		–		13	2
Urawa Red Diamonds	2010	13	1	0	0	5	0	–		18	1
Urawa Red Diamonds	2011	25	0	0	0	3	0	–		28	0
Urawa Red Diamonds	2012	0	0	–		2	0	–		2	0
Urawa Red Diamonds	Total	38	1	0	0	10	0	–		48	1
Al-Arabi	2012–13	13	2	0	0	0	0	–		13	2
Al-Arabi	Total	13	2	0	0	0	0	0	0	13	2
Western Sydney Wanderers	2013–14	18	1	–		–		7	0	25	1
Western Sydney Wanderers	2014–15	13	0	0	0	–		1	0	14	0
Western Sydney Wanderers	Total	31	1	0	0	–		8	0	39	1
Hangzhou Greentown	2015	9	1	0	0	–		–		9	1
Hangzhou Greentown	2016	24	0	0	0	–		–		24	0
Hangzhou Greentown	2017	16	0	0	0	–		–		16	0
Hangzhou Greentown	Total	49	1	0	0	–		0	0	49	1
Career total		171	7	3	0	10	0	9	0	190	7

^{1}Includes QSL play-offs and A-League finals series.

^{2}Includes DFB-Pokal, Emperor's Cup and FFA Cup.

^{3}Includes J. League Cup.

^{4}Includes UEFA Europa League and AFC Champions League.

=== International ===
==== Under–17 ====
Scores and results list Australia U–17's goal tally first.

#	Date	Venue	Opponent	Score	Result	Competition
1.	26 July 2005	Lima	Peru	2–2	2–2	Four-Nations tournament

==== Socceroos ====
As of 7 June 2019

National team	Year	Apps	Goals
Australia
Australia	2008	2	0
Australia	2009	2	0
Australia	2010	1	0
Australia	2011	7	0
Australia	2012	4	0
Australia	2013	0	0
Australia	2014	5	0
Australia	2015	9	0
Australia	2016	4	0
Australia	2017	1	0
Australia	2019	1	0
Total		36	0

== Honours ==
1. FC Nürnberg

- DFB-Pokal: 2006–07

Urawa Red Diamonds

- J. League Cup runners-up: 2011

Western Sydney Wanderers

- AFC Champions League: 2014

Perth Glory

- A-League: Premiers 2018–19

Melbourne Victory

- FFA Cup: 2021

Australia U-17

- OFC U-17 Championship: 2005

Australia

- AFC Asian Cup: 2015; runner-up 2011

Individual

- Weinstein Medal Junior Player of the Year: 2005
