= Marcus Tulio Tanaka =

Japanese footballer (born 1981)

Marcus Túlio Tanaka 田中 マルクス 闘莉王
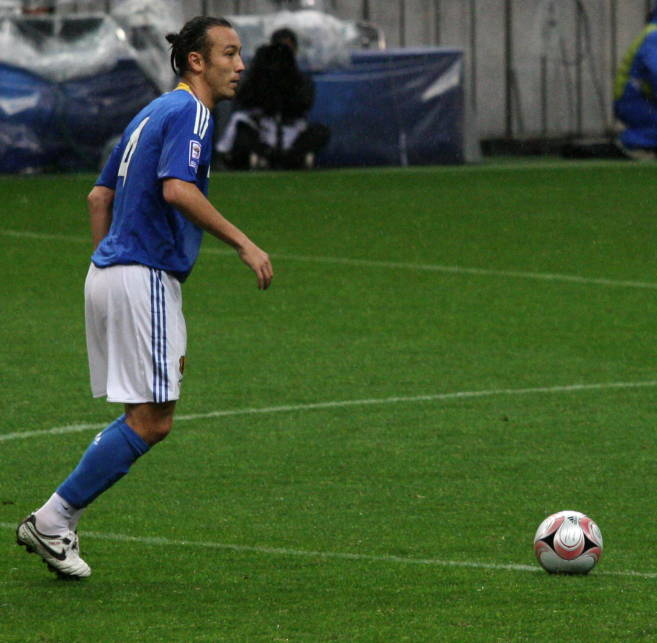
- Tulio with Japan in 2008

Personal information
- Full name: Marcus Túlio Lyuji Murzani Tanaka
- Date of birth: 24 April 1981 (age 45)
- Place of birth: Palmeira d'Oeste, São Paulo, Brazil
- Height: 1.85 m (6 ft 1 in)
- Position: Centre-back

Youth career
- 1997: Mirassol
- 1998–2000: Shibuya Makuhari High School

Senior career*
Years	Team	Apps	(Gls)
2001–2002	Sanfrecce Hiroshima	39	(2)
2003	Mito HollyHock	42	(10)
2004–2009	Urawa Red Diamonds	168	(37)
2010–2016	Nagoya Grampus	188	(36)
2017–2019	Kyoto Sanga	92	(19)
Total		499	(104)

International career
2004	Japan U23	7	(0)
2006–2010	Japan	43	(8)
Medal record
Urawa Red Diamonds
Winner	AFC Champions League	2007
Winner	J1 League	2006
Runner-up	J1 League	2004
Runner-up	J1 League	2005
Runner-up	J1 League	2007
Runner-up	J.League Cup	2004
Winner	Emperor's Cup	2005
Winner	Emperor's Cup	2006
Nagoya Grampus
Winner	J1 League	2010
Runner-up	J1 League	2011
- * Club domestic league appearances and goals

Marcus Túlio Tanaka (田中 マルクス 闘莉王, Tanaka Marukusu Tūrio; born Marcus Túlio Lyuji Murzani Tanaka on 24 April 1981) is a former professional footballer who played as a centre-back. Born in Brazil, he represented Japan at international level.

== Club career ==
Born in Palmeira d'Oeste, Brazil to an Italian Brazilian mother and second generation Japanese Brazilian father, Tulio moved to Japan at age 15 to complete his high school studies. After graduation from Shibuya Makuhari High School in Chiba Prefecture in 2001, Tulio joined the J1 League club Sanfrecce Hiroshima. In the opening game of the 2001 season on 11 March, he debuted as substitute defender in the tenth minute, replacing the injured Tony Popovic, and scored a goal in the 16th minute. After the debut, he played many matches as centre-back in two seasons. Sanfrecce was relegated to J2 League end of 2002 season.

In 2003, Tulio moved to fellow J2 League side Mito HollyHock. On 10 October 2003, he received approval to naturalise as a Japanese citizen. Playing as a centre-back, he scored ten goals in the 2003 season.

In 2004, after a season at Mito, Tulio returned to the J1 League, joining Urawa Red Diamonds. After the strong performance in 2006 season, which led Urawa to win their first ever J1 League title, he received J.League Most Valuable Player. In 2007, Urawa won their first Asian champions in AFC Champions League. On 22 December 2009, after falling out with the management at Urawa as he was deployed in an unfamiliar position at the back, Tulio joined Nagoya Grampus. He played 168 games and scored 37 goals in 6 seasons and was selected in the team's Best Eleven every season.

In his first season in Nagoya, Nagoya won the champions in 2010 J1 League first time in the club history. Nagoya also won the 2nd place in 2011 season. On 9 January 2016, Nagoya Grampus announced that the club and Tulio were parting ways. Nearly nine months later, on 28 August 2016, Tulio re-signed for Nagoya Grampus under new manager Boško Gjurovski, before leaving Nagoya Grampus at the end of the 2016 season upon the expiration of his contract.

In the off-season of the 2016–17 season, at the age of 35, Tulio signed with J2 club Kyoto Sanga FC.

== International career ==
Tulio obtained his Japanese citizenship on 10 October 2003. He played for the Japan U23 national team at the 2004 Olympic Games. He played as centre-back in full time in all three matches.

Tulio made his debut for the Japan's senior national team on 9 August 2006, against Trinidad and Tobago. He scored his first goal for Japan on 15 November 2006 in a 2007 Asian Cup qualifier against Saudi Arabia.

He missed the 2007 AFC Asian Cup finals due to injury. His absence was a big blow to the Japan national team.

He was selected for the Japan national team for 2010 FIFA World Cup. On 30 May, he scored for Japan against England in the 7th minute of a World Cup warm-up, and also scored for England against Japan in the form of an own goal 67 minutes later. As Japan's captain Yuji Nakazawa later also scored an own goal, the game finished 2–1 for England. On 4 June, he scored for Ivory Coast against Japan in the form of an own goal in the 13th minute of a friendly match. Three minutes later, he injured Côte d'Ivoire attacker Didier Drogba's elbow which was fractured by a high challenge from Tulio.

At the 2010 FIFA World Cup, he played full time in all four matches as center back with Yuji Nakazawa. Japan qualified to the knockout stage. This tournament was his last performance for Japan. He played 43 games and scored 8 goals for Japan.

== Career statistics ==
=== Club ===
As of end of 2019 season

Appearances and goals by club, season and competition
Club	Season	League			Emperor's Cup		J.League Cup		AFC		Total	
Club	Season	Division	Apps	Goals	Apps	Goals	Apps	Goals	Apps	Goals	Apps	Goals
Sanfrecce Hiroshima	2001	J1 League	17	1	0	0	5	0	–		22	1
Sanfrecce Hiroshima	2002	J1 League	22	1	0	0	5	0	–		27	1
Mito HollyHock	2003	J2 League	42	10	3	0	–		–		45	10
Urawa Red Diamonds	2004	J1 League	21	3	1	0	6	1	–		28	4
Urawa Red Diamonds	2005	J1 League	26	9	2	0	7	1	–		35	10
Urawa Red Diamonds	2006	J1 League	33	7	1	0	7	1	–		41	8
Urawa Red Diamonds	2007	J1 League	26	3	1	0	0	0	10 (Note: Two appearances at FIFA Club World Cup)	0	37	3
Urawa Red Diamonds	2008	J1 League	31	11	1	0	1	0	4	1	37	12
Urawa Red Diamonds	2009	J1 League	31	4	0	0	1	1	–		32	5
Nagoya Grampus	2010	J1 League	29	6	0	0	1	0	–		30	6
Nagoya Grampus	2011	J1 League	31	6	0	0	2	2	5	0	38	8
Nagoya Grampus	2012	J1 League	33	9	3	3	2	1	5	2	43	15
Nagoya Grampus	2013	J1 League	27	3	0	0	4	1	–		31	4
Nagoya Grampus	2014	J1 League	31	7	4	2	4	3	–		39	12
Nagoya Grampus	2015	J1 League	30	5	0	0	6	2	–		36	7
Nagoya Grampus	2016	J1 League	7	0	0	0	0	0	–		7	0
Kyoto Sanga FC	2017	J2 League	31	15	0	0	–		–		31	15
Kyoto Sanga FC	2018	J2 League	31	4	0	0	–		–		31	4
Kyoto Sanga FC	2019	J2 League	30	0	0	0	–		–		30	0
Career total			529	104	16	5	51	13	24	3	620	125

=== International ===
Appearances and goals by national team and year
National team	Year	Apps	Goals
Japan	2006	5	1
Japan	2007	4	1
Japan	2008	10	2
Japan	2009	13	2
Japan	2010	11	2
Total		43	8

Scores and results list Japan's goal tally first, score column indicates score after each Tulio goal.

List of international goals scored by Marcus Tulio Tanaka
No.	Date	Venue	Opponent	Score	Result	Competition
1	15 November 2006	Sapporo Dome, Sapporo, Japan	Saudi Arabia	1–0	3–1	2007 AFC Asian Cup qualification
2	22 August 2007	Kyushu Sekiyu Dome, Ōita, Japan	Cameroon	1–0	2–0	Friendly match (2007 Kirin Challenge Cup)
3	14 June 2008	Rajamangala Stadium, Bangkok, Thailand	Thailand	1–0	3–0	2010 FIFA World Cup qualification
4	19 November 2008	Jassim bin Hamad Stadium, Doha, Qatar	Qatar	3–0	3–0	2010 FIFA World Cup qualification
5	17 June 2009	Melbourne Cricket Ground, Melbourne, Australia	Australia	1–0	1–2	2010 FIFA World Cup qualification
6	8 October 2009	Outsourcing Stadium, Shizuoka, Japan	Hong Kong	4–0	6–0	2011 AFC Asian Cup qualification
7	11 February 2010	National Stadium, Tokyo, Japan	Hong Kong	2–0	3–0	2010 East Asian Football Championship
8	30 May 2010	UPC-Arena, Graz, Austria	England	1–0	1–2	Friendly match

== Honours ==
Urawa Red Diamonds

- AFC Champions League: 2007
- J1 League: 2006
- Emperor's Cup: 2005, 2006
- Japanese Super Cup: 2006

Nagoya Grampus

- J1 League: 2010
- Japanese Super Cup: 2011

Japan

- Kirin Cup: 2007, 2008, 2009

Individual

- Japanese Footballer of the Year: 2006
- J.League Most Valuable Player: 2006
- J.League Best Eleven: 2004, 2005, 2006, 2007, 2008, 2009, 2010, 2011, 2012
- J.League 30th Anniversary Team
