= Mazola (footballer) =

Brazilian footballer (born 1989)

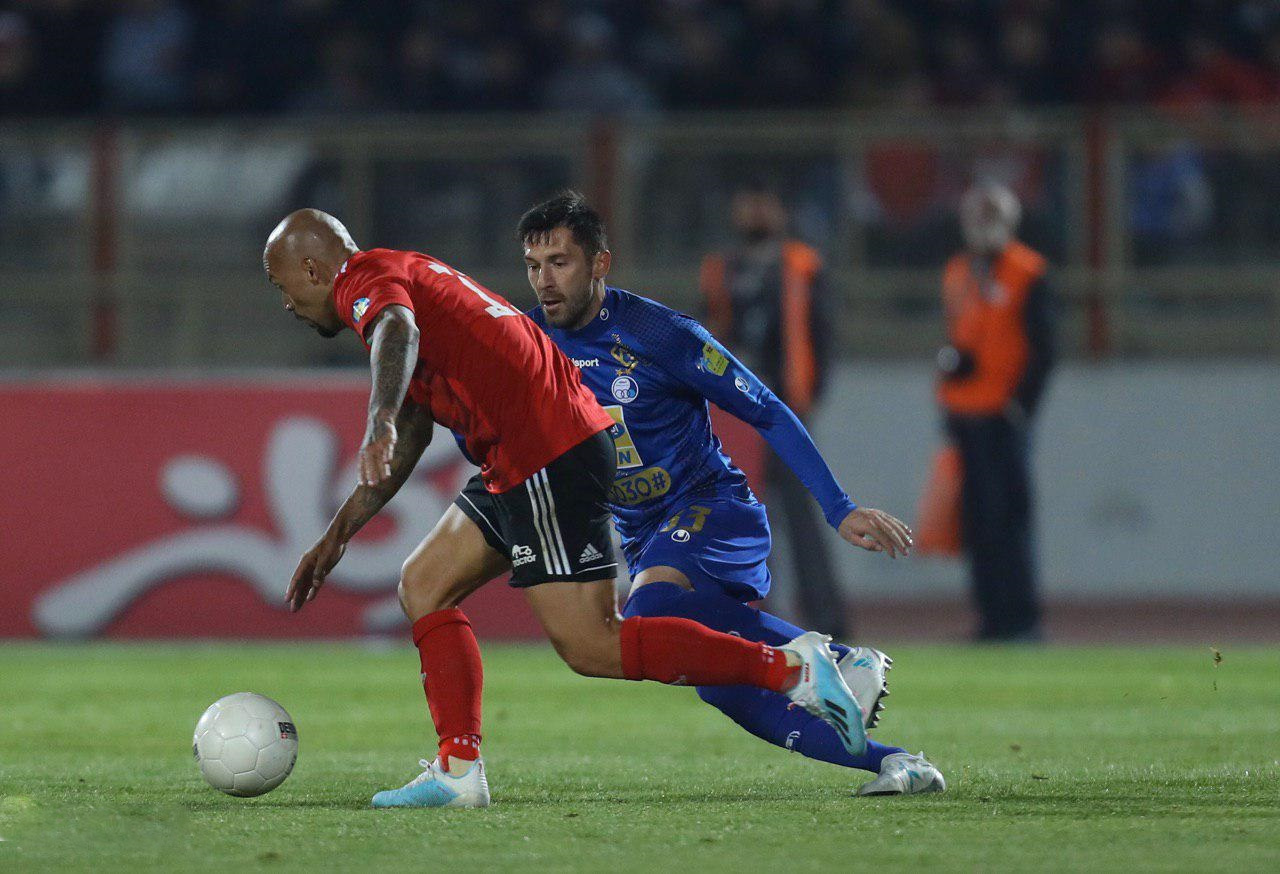
- Mazola in 2019

Personal information
- Full name: Marcelino Junior Lopes Arruda
- Date of birth: 8 May 1989 (age 37)
- Place of birth: Guarulhos, São Paulo, Brazil
- Height: 1.76 m (5 ft 9 in)
- Position: Forward

Team information
- Current team: Ypiranga de Erechim

Youth career
- 2000–2006: Portuguesa
- 2007: Ituano
- 2007–2008: São Paulo

Senior career*
Years	Team	Apps	(Gls)
2008–2013	São Paulo	49	(17)
2010	→ Paulista (loan)	8	(2)
2010	→ Guarani (loan)	18	(11)
2011	→ Urawa Reds (loan)	13	(5)
2012–2013	→ Hangzhou Greentown (loan)	21	(7)
2014–2015	Portimonense	1	(0)
2014–2015	→ Figueirense (loan)	14	(6)
2015	→ Ceará (loan)	15	(3)
2016–2017	Guizhou Zhicheng	28	(14)
2017	Jeonbuk Hyundai Motors	17	(6)
2018	CRB	3	(1)
2018	São Bento	23	(8)
2019–2020	Tractor	9	(0)
2020	Juventus	7	(1)
2020–2021	Caxias	10	(0)
2021–2022	São José	26	(4)
2023–	Ypiranga de Erechim	1	(0)
- * Club domestic league appearances and goals as of 5 August 2023

Marcelino Junior Lopes Arruda (born 8 May 1989), better known as Mazola, is a Brazilian professional footballer who plays for Ypiranga de Erechim as a forward.

== Career ==
Hired by São Paulo for the period 2008-2011, played in the Copa Sudamericana in 2008 and did not score.

Before going to São Paulo, was part of the basic categories of the Portuguesa (for which he was champion São Paulo child) and Ituano.

Was loaned to São Paulo in 2009 and stayed until the end of the Campeonato Paulista in 2010, and again borrowed, this time the Guarani of Campinas, to compete in the Campeonato Brasileiro in 2010 until the end of the year, where he has scored seven goals. In an interview with globoesporte.com, he said:-It 's all right. I signed a contract with Al-Jazira and this was done to keep the Ricardo Oliveira on loan at São Paulo. I was happy to have set the transfer. In São Paulo, I had no chance to play, would be just one - said the athlete.

== Career statistics ==
As of match played 27 April 2024

Appearances and goals by club, season and competition
Club	Season	League			State league		National cup		League cup		Continental		Other		Total	
Club	Season	Division	Apps	Goals	Apps	Goals	Apps	Goals	Apps	Goals	Apps	Goals	Apps	Goals	Apps	Goals
São Paulo	2008	Série A	0	0	0	0	—		—		2	0	—		2	0
São Paulo	2009	Série A	0	0	—		—		—		—		—		0	0
São Paulo	2010	Série A	—		1	0	—		—		—		—		1	0
São Paulo	2011	Série A	—		1	0	—		—		—		—		1	0
São Paulo	Total		0	0	2	0	—		—		2	0	—		4	0
Paulista (loan)	2010	Paulista	—		12	2	—		—		—		—		12	2
Guarani (loan)	2010	Série A	29	6	—		—		—		—		—		29	6
Urawa Red Diamonds (loan)	2011	J. League Division 1	21	3	—		2	1	3	0	—		—		26	4
Hangzhou Greentown (loan)	2012	Chinese Super League	20	3	—		2	0	—		—		—		22	3
Hangzhou Greentown (loan)	2013	Chinese Super League	22	0	—		0	0	—		—		—		22	0
Hangzhou Greentown (loan)	Total		42	3	—		2	0	—		—		—		44	3
Portimonense	2013–14	Segunda Liga	7	2	—		—		—		—		—		7	2
Figueirense (loan)	2014	Série A	10	3	—		0	0	—		—		—		10	3
Figueirense (loan)	2015	Série A	4	0	17	3	4	0	—		—		—		25	3
Figueirense (loan)	Total		14	3	17	3	4	0	—		—		—		35	6
Ceará (loan)	2015	Série B	15	1	—		0	0	—		—		—		15	1
Guizhou Zhicheng	2016	China League One	28	14	—		0	0	—		—		—		28	14
CRB	2018	Série B	19	1	0	0	0	0	—		—		1	0	20	1
São Bento	2019	Paulista	—		8	0	—		—		—		—		8	0
Tractor	2019–20	Persian Gulf Pro League	9	0	—		—		—		—		—		9	0
Juventus	2020	Paulista A2	—		7	1	5	1	—		—		—		12	2
Caxias	2020	Série D	2	0	—		—		—		—		—		2	0
Caxias	2021	Série D	0	0	7	0	1	0	—		—		—		8	0
Caxias	Total		2	0	7	0	1	0	—		—		—		10	0
São José	2021	Série C	10	2	—		—		—		—		—		10	2
São José	2022	Série C	9	1	7	1	—		—		—		—		16	2
São José	Total		19	3	7	1	—		—		—		—		26	4
Ypiranga	2023	Série C	0	0	1	0	1	0	—		—		—		2	0
Sertãozinho	2024	Paulista A3	—		13	0	—		—		—		—		13	0
Career total			204	36	76	7	15	2	3	0	2	0	1	0	301	45
