= 2017 Kyoto Sanga FC season =

Kyoto Sanga FC
2017 season
- Manager: Takanori Nunobe
- Stadium: Kyoto Nishikyogoku Athletic Stadium
- J2 League: 12th
Home colours	Away colours

2017 Kyoto Sanga FC season.

== J2 League ==
=== League table ===
Pos	Team	Pld	W	D	L	GF	GA	GD	Pts
11	Montedio Yamagata	42	14	17	11	45	47	−2	59
12	Kyoto Sanga	42	14	15	13	55	47	+8	57
13	Fagiano Okayama	42	13	16	13	44	49	−5	55

Updated to match(es) played on 28 November 2017. Source: 2017 MEIJI YASUDA J2 LEAGUE League table
Rules for classification: 1) Points; 2) Goal difference; 3) Goals scored

=== Match details ===
J2 League match details
Match	Date	Team	Score	Team	Venue	Attendance
1	2017.02.26	Kyoto Sanga FC	1-2	Montedio Yamagata	Kyoto Nishikyogoku Athletic Stadium	8,857
2	2017.03.04	Kyoto Sanga FC	1-0	Tokushima Vortis	Kyoto Nishikyogoku Athletic Stadium	5,948
3	2017.03.12	Avispa Fukuoka	2-1	Kyoto Sanga FC	Level5 Stadium	7,586
4	2017.03.19	Fagiano Okayama	2-1	Kyoto Sanga FC	City Light Stadium	10,214
5	2017.03.25	Kyoto Sanga FC	0-1	V-Varen Nagasaki	Kyoto Nishikyogoku Athletic Stadium	5,854
6	2017.04.01	JEF United Chiba	2-2	Kyoto Sanga FC	Fukuda Denshi Arena	7,716
7	2017.04.08	Yokohama FC	2-0	Kyoto Sanga FC	NHK Spring Mitsuzawa Football Stadium	2,908
8	2017.04.15	Kyoto Sanga FC	3-2	Ehime FC	Kyoto Nishikyogoku Athletic Stadium	5,429
9	2017.04.22	Kyoto Sanga FC	1-1	Matsumoto Yamaga FC	Kyoto Nishikyogoku Athletic Stadium	7,625
10	2017.04.29	Oita Trinita	1-3	Kyoto Sanga FC	Oita Bank Dome	7,334
11	2017.05.03	Nagoya Grampus	1-1	Kyoto Sanga FC	Toyota Stadium	36,755
12	2017.05.07	Kyoto Sanga FC	1-0	Kamatamare Sanuki	Kyoto Nishikyogoku Athletic Stadium	6,813
13	2017.05.13	Renofa Yamaguchi FC	1-1	Kyoto Sanga FC	Ishin Memorial Park Stadium	4,220
14	2017.05.17	Kyoto Sanga FC	1-1	Mito HollyHock	Kyoto Nishikyogoku Athletic Stadium	4,918
15	2017.05.21	Tokyo Verdy	1-2	Kyoto Sanga FC	Ajinomoto Stadium	5,435
16	2017.05.27	Kyoto Sanga FC	1-1	FC Gifu	Kyoto Nishikyogoku Athletic Stadium	8,100
17	2017.06.05	Roasso Kumamoto	0-3	Kyoto Sanga FC	Egao Kenko Stadium	4,533
18	2017.06.11	Kyoto Sanga FC	2-2	FC Machida Zelvia	Kyoto Nishikyogoku Athletic Stadium	9,119
19	2017.06.17	Shonan Bellmare	1-0	Kyoto Sanga FC	Shonan BMW Stadium Hiratsuka	9,050
20	2017.06.25	Kyoto Sanga FC	1-3	Zweigen Kanazawa	Kyoto Nishikyogoku Athletic Stadium	4,410
21	2017.07.01	Kyoto Sanga FC	1-0	Thespakusatsu Gunma	Kyoto Nishikyogoku Athletic Stadium	6,561
22	2017.07.09	FC Gifu	3-2	Kyoto Sanga FC	Gifu Nagaragawa Stadium	6,356
23	2017.07.16	Tokushima Vortis	1-1	Kyoto Sanga FC	Pocarisweat Stadium	6,344
24	2017.07.22	Kyoto Sanga FC	3-1	Nagoya Grampus	Kyoto Nishikyogoku Athletic Stadium	10,750
25	2017.07.29	FC Machida Zelvia	0-2	Kyoto Sanga FC	Machida Stadium	2,420
26	2017.08.05	Kyoto Sanga FC	1-1	Fagiano Okayama	Kyoto Nishikyogoku Athletic Stadium	5,544
27	2017.08.11	Kyoto Sanga FC	0-1	Avispa Fukuoka	Kyoto Nishikyogoku Athletic Stadium	8,523
28	2017.08.16	Mito HollyHock	2-0	Kyoto Sanga FC	K's denki Stadium Mito	5,540
29	2017.08.20	Kyoto Sanga FC	2-2	Oita Trinita	Kyoto Nishikyogoku Athletic Stadium	4,966
30	2017.08.27	V-Varen Nagasaki	1-0	Kyoto Sanga FC	Transcosmos Stadium Nagasaki	5,032
31	2017.09.02	Kyoto Sanga FC	1-2	Renofa Yamaguchi FC	Kyoto Nishikyogoku Athletic Stadium	4,896
32	2017.09.09	Montedio Yamagata	2-2	Kyoto Sanga FC	ND Soft Stadium Yamagata	5,970
34	2017.09.23	Kyoto Sanga FC	0-0	Shonan Bellmare	Kyoto Nishikyogoku Athletic Stadium	6,513
35	2017.09.30	Kyoto Sanga FC	2-0	JEF United Chiba	Kyoto Nishikyogoku Athletic Stadium	6,604
36	2017.10.08	Kamatamare Sanuki	0-4	Kyoto Sanga FC	Pikara Stadium	3,397
37	2017.10.14	Kyoto Sanga FC	2-1	Roasso Kumamoto	Kyoto Nishikyogoku Athletic Stadium	7,483
38	2017.10.22	Zweigen Kanazawa	0-0	Kyoto Sanga FC	Ishikawa Athletics Stadium	2,701
39	2017.10.28	Kyoto Sanga FC	2-2	Yokohama FC	Kyoto Nishikyogoku Athletic Stadium	5,427
40	2017.11.05	Thespakusatsu Gunma	1-1	Kyoto Sanga FC	Shoda Shoyu Stadium Gunma	2,912
33	2017.11.08	Ehime FC	0-2	Kyoto Sanga FC	Ningineer Stadium	1,958
41	2017.11.11	Kyoto Sanga FC	0-1	Tokyo Verdy	Kyoto Nishikyogoku Athletic Stadium	7,365
42	2017.11.19	Matsumoto Yamaga FC	0-1	Kyoto Sanga FC	Matsumotodaira Park Stadium	15,872
