= Koji Noda =

Japanese footballer

Koji Noda 野田 紘史
Personal information
- Full name: Koji Noda
- Date of birth: 17 August 1986 (age 40)
- Place of birth: Kurume, Fukuoka, Japan
- Height: 1.69 m (5 ft 6 1/2 in)
- Position: Left back

Team information
- Current team: ReinMeer Aomori
- Number: 2

Youth career
- 2005–2008: Hannan University

Senior career*
Years	Team	Apps	(Gls)
2009–2013	Urawa Reds	22	(0)
2009–2010	→ Fagiano Okayama (loan)	46	(1)
2014	V-Varen Nagasaki	27	(2)
2015	Ventforet Kofu	9	(0)
2015–2018	Zweigen Kanazawa	64	(1)
2019–	ReinMeer Aomori	30	(1)
Medal record
Urawa Reds
Runner-up	J.League Cup	2011
Runner-up	J.League Cup	2013
- * Club domestic league appearances and goals as of 1 January 2020

Koji Noda (野田 紘史, Noda Kōji; born 17 August 1986 in Kurume, Fukuoka) is a Japanese footballer who currently plays for ReinMeer Aomori.

== Career ==
On 9 January 2019, Noda signed with ReinMeer Aomori FC.

== Career statistics ==
Updated to 23 February 2020.

Club	Season	League		Emperor's Cup		J. League Cup		Total	
Club	Season	Apps	Goals	Apps	Goals	Apps	Goals	Apps	Goals
Hannan University	2008	-		2	0	-		2	0
Urawa Red Diamonds	2009	0	0	-		0	0	0	0
Fagiano Okayama	2009	18	0	0	0	-		18	0
Fagiano Okayama	2010	28	1	1	0	-		29	1
Urawa Red Diamonds	2011	10	0	2	0	3	0	15	0
Urawa Red Diamonds	2012	12	0	2	0	4	1	18	1
Urawa Red Diamonds	2013	0	0	2	0	0	0	2	0
V-Varen Nagasaki	2014	27	2	2	0	-		29	2
Ventforet Kofu	2015	9	0	-		6	0	15	0
Zweigen Kanazawa	2015	11	0	0	0	-		11	0
Zweigen Kanazawa	2016	30	1	0	0	-		30	1
Zweigen Kanazawa	2017	23	0	2	0	-		25	0
Zweigen Kanazawa	2018	0	0	0	0	-		0	0
ReinMeer Aomori	2019	30	1	-		-		30	1
Career total		198	5	11	0	13	1	212	6
