= Edmílson (footballer, born 1982) =

Brazilian footballer

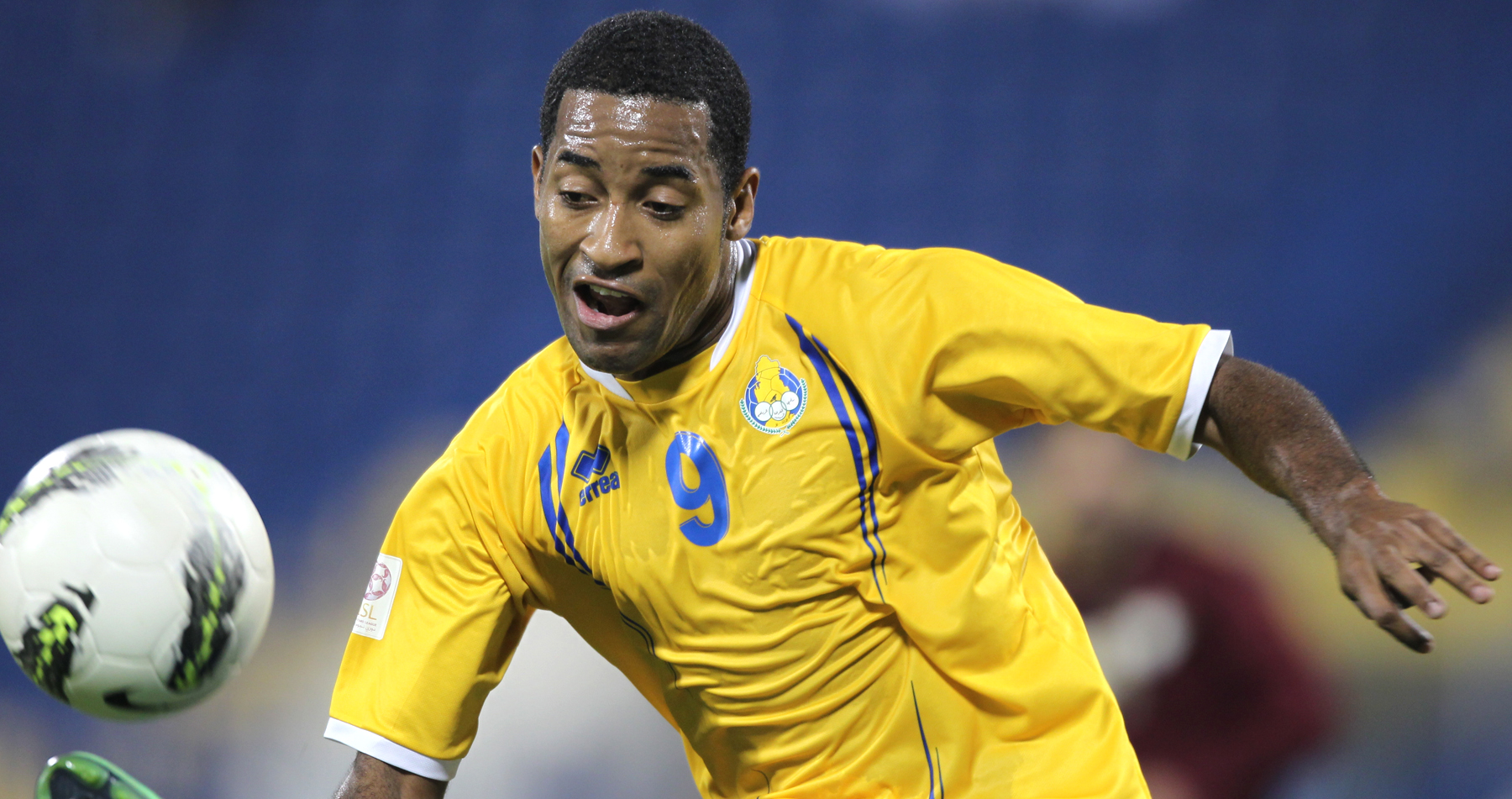
- Edmílson with Al-Gharafa

Personal information
- Full name: Edmílson dos Santos Silva
- Date of birth: 15 September 1982 (age 44)
- Place of birth: Salvador, Bahia, Brazil
- Height: 1.83 m (6 ft 0 in)
- Position: Forward

Youth career
- 2000: Palmeiras

Senior career*
Years	Team	Apps	(Gls)
2001–2003	Palmeiras		
2004–2007	Albirex Niigata	116	(62)
2008–2011	Urawa Reds	110	(47)
2011–2012	Al-Gharafa	10	(4)
2012	→ FC Tokyo (loan)	10	(2)
2013–2014	Vasco da Gama	51	(11)
2015	Red Bull Brasil	14	(7)
2015	Chapecoense	0	(0)
2015	Cerezo Osaka	16	(2)
2016	Red Bull Brasil	13	(1)
2016	Sport Recife	22	(5)
2017	Esporte Clube Santo André	7	(1)
2017–2018	Red Bull Brasil	20	(6)
- * Club domestic league appearances and goals

Edmilson dos Santos Silva, or simply Edmílson (born 15 September 1982), is a Brazilian former professional footballer who plays as a forward.

== Playing career ==
Edmílson started his career playing for the Palmeiras. In January 2004, he joined J1 League side Albirex Niigata on loan from Palmeiras. He had a short loan spell at Niigata, and signed a permanent deal next year. He played for the club, scoring 62 league goals in four seasons as a regular player.

Edmílson moved to J1 League rival Urawa Red Diamonds in January 2008. He continued his successful career with Urawa, scoring 11 goals in 31 appearances. He ended up the second highest scorer in the league for the 2009 season with 17 goals.

On 29 June 2011, Urawa announced that Edmílson would leave Japan to join Qatari club Al-Gharafa.

On 25 April 2015, Edmílson joined Chapecoense.

== Career statistics ==
As of 29 June 2011

Appearances and goals by club, season and competition
Club	Season	League		National cup (Note: Includes Emperor's Cup.)		League cup (Note: Includes J.League Cup.)		Continental (Note: Includes AFC Champions League.)		Total	
Club	Season	Apps	Goals	Apps	Goals	Apps	Goals	Apps	Goals	Apps	Goals
Palmeiras	2001							–			
Palmeiras	2002							–			
Palmeiras	2003	12	7					–		12	7
Palmeiras	Total	12	7					–		12	7
Albirex Niigata	2004	29	15	1	0	5	4	–		35	19
Albirex Niigata	2005	33	18	1	0	6	4	–		40	22
Albirex Niigata	2006	25	10	2	1	1	2	–		28	13
Albirex Niigata	2007	29	19	1	0	5	3	–		35	22
Albirex Niigata	Total	116	62	5	1	17	9	–		138	72
Urawa Reds	2008	31	11	2	0	6	3	4	2	43	16
Urawa Reds	2009	33	17	1	0	7	3	–		41	20
Urawa Reds	2010	34	16	4	3	6	2	–		44	21
Urawa Reds	2011	12	3	–		1	1	–		13	4
Urawa Reds	Total	110	47	7	3	20	9	4	2	140	61
Al-Gharafa	2011–12										
Career total		238	116	12	4	37	18	4	2	291	140

== Honours ==
Palmeiras

- Campeonato Brasileiro Série B: 2003
