= Yusuke Hayashi =

Former Japanese association football player

Personal information
- Full name: Yusuke Hayashi
- Date of birth: 23 January 1990 (age 36)
- Place of birth: Morioka, Japan
- Height: 1.70 m (5 ft 7 in)
- Position: Attacking midfielder

Team information
- Current team: Stallion Laguna

Youth career
- 2005–2007: Morioka Commercial High School

Senior career*
Years	Team	Apps	(Gls)
2008–2010	Urawa Red Diamonds	2	(0)
2011–2012	Thespa Kusatsu	35	(0)
2013–2018	Grulla Morioka	93	(7)
2017–2023	Morioka Zebra	23	(2)
2023–	Stallion Laguna	0	(0)
- * Club domestic league appearances and goals as of 16 February 2023

Yusuke Hayashi (林 勇介, Hayashi Yūsuke; born 23 January 1990) is a Japanese footballer who plays as a midfielder for Philippines Football League side Stallion Laguna.

== Career statistics ==
Updated to 2 February 2018.

Club performance			League		Cup		League Cup		Continental		Total	
Season	Club	League	Apps	Goals	Apps	Goals	Apps	Goals	Apps	Goals	Apps	Goals
Japan			League		Emperor's Cup		League Cup		Asia		Total	
2008	Urawa Red Diamonds	J1 League	0	0	0	0	0	0	0	0	0	0
2009	Urawa Red Diamonds	J1 League	1	0	0	0	1	0	-		2	0
2010	Urawa Red Diamonds	J1 League	1	0	2	0	1	0	-		4	0
2011	Thespa Kusatsu	J2 League	8	0	0	0	-		-		8	0
2012	Thespa Kusatsu	J2 League	27	0	1	1	-		-		28	1
2013	Grulla Morioka	JRL (Tohoku, Div. 1)	7	1	0	0	-		-		7	1
2014	Grulla Morioka	J3 League	19	1	1	0	-		-		20	1
2015	Grulla Morioka	J3 League	22	5	1	0	-		-		23	5
2016	Grulla Morioka	J3 League	22	0	1	0	-		-		23	0
2017	Grulla Morioka	J3 League	23	0	2	1	-		-		25	1
Career total			130	7	8	2	2	0	0	0	140	9
