= Yoshiya Nishizawa =

Japanese footballer

Yoshiya Nishizawa 西澤 代志也
Personal information
- Full name: Yoshiya Nishizawa
- Date of birth: June 13, 1987 (age 39)
- Place of birth: Iruma, Saitama, Japan
- Height: 1.74 m (5 ft 9 in)
- Position: Right winger

Team information
- Current team: Okinawa SV
- Number: 13

Youth career
- 2003–2005: Urawa Red Diamonds Youth

Senior career*
Years	Team	Apps	(Gls)
2006–2010	Urawa Red Diamonds	7	(0)
2010	Thespa Kusatsu	17	(0)
2011–2018	Tochigi SC	125	(1)
2019–	Okinawa SV	15	(2)
Medal record
Urawa Red Diamonds
Winner	AFC Champions League	2007
Winner	J1 League	2006
Runner-up	J1 League	2007
Winner	Emperor's Cup	2006
- * Club domestic league appearances and goals as of 2 January 2020

Yoshiya Nishizawa (西澤 代志也, Nishizawa Yoshiya; born June 13, 1987) is a Japanese football player who plays for Okinawa SV.

== Career statistics ==
Updated to 23 February 2020.

Club performance			League		Cup		League Cup		Continental		Total	
Season	Club	League	Apps	Goals	Apps	Goals	Apps	Goals	Apps	Goals	Apps	Goals
Japan			League		Emperor's Cup		J. League Cup		AFC		Total	
2006	Urawa Red Diamonds	J1 League	0	0	0	0	0	0	-		0	0
2007	Urawa Red Diamonds	J1 League	0	0	0	0	0	0	0	0	0	0
2008	Urawa Red Diamonds	J1 League	0	0	1	0	2	0	0	0	3	0
2009	Urawa Red Diamonds	J1 League	7	0	0	0	7	1	-		14	1
2010	Urawa Red Diamonds	J1 League	0	0	-		0	0	-		0	0
2010	Thespa Kusatsu	J2 League	17	0	1	0	-		-		18	0
2011	Tochigi SC	J2 League	15	0	0	0	-		-		15	0
2012	Tochigi SC	J2 League	9	0	0	0	-		-		9	0
2013	Tochigi SC	J2 League	12	0	0	0	-		-		12	0
2014	Tochigi SC	J2 League	27	0	0	0	-		-		27	0
2015	Tochigi SC	J2 League	8	0	0	0	-		-		8	0
2016	Tochigi SC	J3 League	23	1	0	0	-		-		23	1
2017	Tochigi SC	J3 League	20	0	0	0	-		-		20	0
2018	Tochigi SC	J2 League	11	0	0	0	-		-		11	0
2019	Okinawa SV	JRL (Kyushu)	15	2	2	0	-		-		17	2
Career total			164	3	4	0	9	1	0	0	177	4
