= Hajime Hosogai =

Japanese footballer (born 1986)

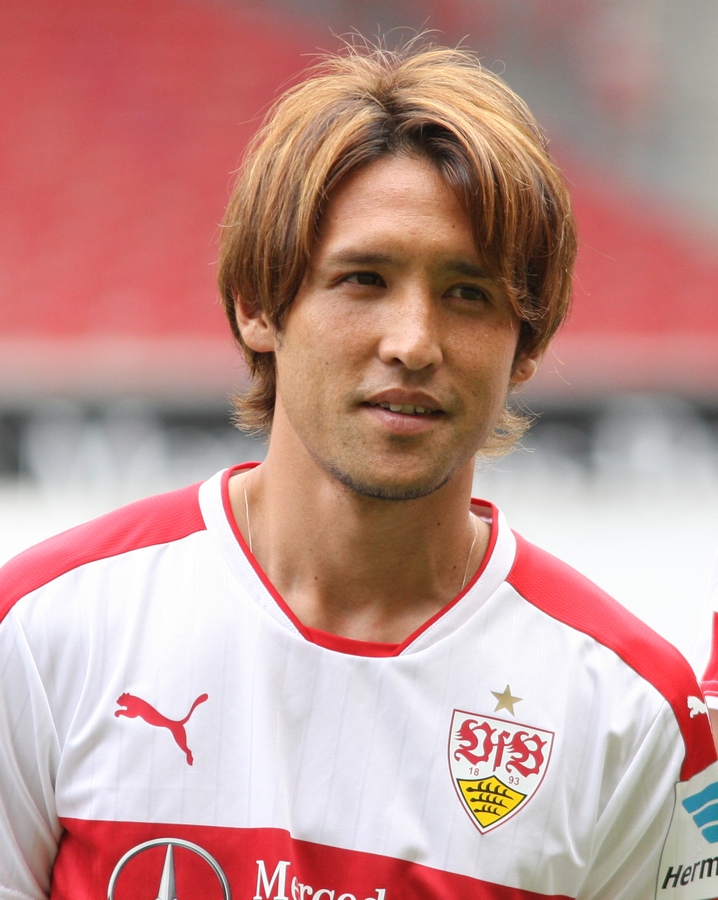
- Hosogai with VfB Stuttgart in 2016

Personal information
- Date of birth: 10 June 1986 (age 40)
- Place of birth: Maebashi, Gunma, Japan
- Height: 1.77 m (5 ft 10 in)
- Positions: Defensive midfielder; full-back

Team information
- Current team: Thespa Gunma
- Number: 33

Youth career
- 1999–2001: FC Maebashi
- 2002–2004: Maebashi Ikuei High School

Senior career*
Years	Team	Apps	(Gls)
2005–2010	Urawa Red Diamonds	98	(5)
2011–2013	Bayer Leverkusen	17	(0)
2011–2012	→ FC Augsburg (loan)	39	(3)
2013–2016	Hertha BSC	53	(0)
2015–2016	→ Bursaspor (loan)	20	(0)
2016–2017	VfB Stuttgart	10	(0)
2017–2018	Kashiwa Reysol	22	(0)
2019–2021	Buriram United	27	(0)
2020–2021	→ Bangkok United (loan)	28	(1)
2021–	Thespa Gunma	36	(1)

International career
2006–2008	Japan U23	10	(1)
2010–2014	Japan	30	(1)
Medal record
Urawa Red Diamonds
Winner	AFC Champions League	2007
Winner	J1 League	2006
Runner-up	J1 League	2005
Runner-up	J1 League	2007
Winner	Emperor's Cup	2005
Winner	Emperor's Cup	2006
Representing Japan
AFC Asian Cup
Gold medal – first place	2011 Qatar
- * Club domestic league appearances and goals as of 18:57, 23 October 2024 (UTC)

Hajime Hosogai (細貝 萌, Hosogai Hajime; born 10 June 1986) is a Japanese professional footballer who plays for Thespa Gunma. He is a flexible player, able to play as a full-back or defensive midfielder. He made 30 appearances for the Japan national team scoring once.

== Club career ==
Hosogai was amongst the most promising players of Urawa Red Diamonds. Having helped the Red Diamonds to the AFC Champions League in 2007, he played for Urawa at the 2007 FIFA Club World Cup.

On 23 December 2010, he left Japan and transferred to the German club Bayer 04 Leverkusen, who promptly loaned him out to FC Augsburg. On 9 September 2011, he scored his first Bundesliga goal against Leverkusen. Playing for the newly promoted Bavarian club, Hosogai helped avoiding relegation before returning to Bayer Leverkusen for the 2012–13 season.

On 25 July 2016, Hosogai moved to VfB Stuttgart. He joined Kashiwa Reysol on 24 March 2017.

On 6 December 2018, it was confirmed that Hosogai would join the Thai league club Buriram United for the 2019 season.

On 12 December 2019, it was announced that Hosogai had joined club Bangkok United on a season-long loan deal.

In October 2024, he announced he would retire at the end of the season.

== International career ==
Hosogai has represented Japan at numerous youth levels. He was a member of the Japan team for the 2008 Summer Olympics finals, and made his debut for the Japan national team in a 1–0 win against Paraguay (playing in his natural role as central midfielder) at his home stadium in Saitama on 4 September 2010, after being called up for the first time by caretaker Hiromi Hara and under the auspices of new manager Alberto Zaccheroni. He scored his first goal for the senior national team on 25 January 2011 in the 2011 AFC Asian Cup semi-final match against South Korea.

== Career statistics ==
=== Club ===
As of 23 February 2017

Appearances and goals by club, season and competition
Club	Season	League		National cup (Note: Includes Emperor's Cup and DFB-Pokal.)		League cup (Note: Includes J. League Cup.)		Continental (Note: Includes AFC Champions League and UEFA Europa League.)		Other (Note: Includes Japanese Super Cup, A3 Champions Cup and FIFA Club World Cup.)		Total	
Club	Season	Apps	Goals	Apps	Goals	Apps	Goals	Apps	Goals	Apps	Goals	Apps	Goals
Urawa Red Diamonds	2005	3	0	3	0	2	0	–		–		8	0
Urawa Red Diamonds	2006	2	0	4	0	6	0	–		1	0	13	0
Urawa Red Diamonds	2007	8	0	1	0	2	1	3	0	5	0	19	1
Urawa Red Diamonds	2008	26	2	1	0	4	0	3	1	–		34	3
Urawa Red Diamonds	2009	31	2	1	0	6	0	–		–		38	2
Urawa Red Diamonds	2010	28	1	1	0	5	0	–		–		34	1
Urawa Red Diamonds	Total	98	5	11	0	25	1	6	1	6	0	146	7
FC Augsburg	2010–11	7	0	–		–		–		–		7	0
FC Augsburg	2011–12	32	3	1	0	–		–		–		33	3
FC Augsburg	Total	39	3	1	0	–		–		–		40	3
Bayer Leverkusen	2012–13	17	0	2	0	–		4	0	–		23	0
Hertha BSC	2013–14	33	0	1	0	–		–		–		34	0
Hertha BSC	2014–15	20	0	2	0	–		–		–		22	0
Hertha BSC	Total	53	0	3	0	–		–		–		56	0
Bursaspor	2015–16	20	0	–		–		–		–		20	0
VfB Stuttgart	2016–17	10	0			–		–		–		10	0
Career total		237	8	17	0	25	1	10	1	6	0	295	10

=== International ===
Appearances and goals by national team and year
National team	Year	Apps	Goals
Japan U23	2006	1	0
Japan U23	2007	6	1
Japan U23	2008	3	0
Total		10	1
Japan	2010	3	0
Japan	2011	7	1
Japan	2012	8	0
Japan	2013	7	0
Japan	2014	5	0
Total		30	1

Scores and results list Japan's goal tally first.

#	Date	Venue	Opponent	Score	Result	Competition
1.	25 January 2011	Thani bin Jassim Stadium, Al Rayyan, Qatar	South Korea	2–1	2–2	2011 AFC Asian Cup

== Honours ==
Urawa Red Diamonds

- AFC Champions League: 2007
- J. League Division 1: 2006
- Emperor's Cup: 2005, 2006
- Japanese Super Cup: 2006

Japan

- AFC Asian Cup: 2011

Individual

- Thai League 1 Player of the Month (1): February 2020
