= 2008 Omiya Ardija season =

Omiya Ardija
2008 season
- Manager: Yasuhiro Higuchi
- Stadium: NACK5 Stadium Omiya
- J. League 1: 12th
- Emperor's Cup: 5th Round
- J. League Cup: GL-D 4th
- Top goalscorer: Denis Marques (8)

2008 Omiya Ardija season

== Competitions ==
Competitions	Position
J. League 1	12th / 18 clubs
Emperor's Cup	5th Round
J. League Cup	GL-D 4th / 4 clubs

== Domestic results ==
=== J. League 1 ===
Match	Date	Venue	Opponents	Score
1	2008..			-
2	2008..			-
3	2008..			-
4	2008..			-
5	2008..			-
6	2008..			-
7	2008..			-
8	2008..			-
9	2008..			-
10	2008..			-
11	2008..			-
12	2008..			-
13	2008..			-
14	2008..			-
15	2008..			-
16	2008..			-
17	2008..			-
18	2008..			-
19	2008..			-
20	2008..			-
21	2008..			-
22	2008..			-
23	2008..			-
24	2008..			-
25	2008..			-
26	2008..			-
27	2008..			-
28	2008..			-
29	2008..			-
30	2008..			-
31	2008..			-
32	2008..			-
33	2008..			-
34	2008..			-

=== Emperor's Cup ===
Match	Date	Venue	Opponents	Score
4th Round	2008..			-
5th Round	2008..			-

=== J. League Cup ===
Match	Date	Venue	Opponents	Score
GL-D-1	2008..			-
GL-D-2	2008..			-
GL-D-3	2008..			-
GL-D-4	2008..			-
GL-D-5	2008..			-
GL-D-6	2008..			-

== Player statistics ==
No.	Pos.	Player	D.o.B. (Age)	Height / Weight	J. League 1		Emperor's Cup		J. League Cup		Total	
No.	Pos.	Player	D.o.B. (Age)	Height / Weight	Apps	Goals	Apps	Goals	Apps	Goals	Apps	Goals
1	GK	Hiroki Aratani	August 6, 1975 (aged 32)	cm / kg	0	0						
2	DF	Taishi Tsukamoto	July 4, 1985 (aged 22)	cm / kg	6	0						
3	DF	Leandro	August 18, 1981 (aged 26)	cm / kg	30	2						
4	DF	Yasuhiro Hato	May 4, 1976 (aged 31)	cm / kg	34	0						
5	DF	Daisuke Tomita	April 24, 1977 (aged 30)	cm / kg	32	2						
6	MF	Yosuke Kataoka	May 26, 1982 (aged 25)	cm / kg	28	1						
7	MF	Naoya Saeki	December 18, 1977 (aged 30)	cm / kg	20	0						
8	MF	Daigo Kobayashi	February 19, 1983 (aged 25)	cm / kg	33	3						
9	FW	Kota Yoshihara	February 2, 1978 (aged 30)	cm / kg	19	2						
10	FW	Denis Marques	February 22, 1981 (aged 27)	cm / kg	20	8						
11	MF	Chikara Fujimoto	October 31, 1977 (aged 30)	cm / kg	28	3						
13	FW	Pedro Júnior	January 29, 1987 (aged 21)	cm / kg	9	2						
14	FW	Hiroshi Morita	May 18, 1978 (aged 29)	cm / kg	16	2						
15	MF	Masato Saito	December 1, 1975 (aged 32)	cm / kg	22	2						
16	FW	Klemen Lavrič	June 12, 1981 (aged 26)	cm / kg	18	5						
17	MF	Hayato Hashimoto	September 15, 1981 (aged 26)	cm / kg	6	0						
18	DF	Takuro Nishimura	August 15, 1977 (aged 30)	cm / kg	0	0						
19	DF	Yusuke Murayama	June 10, 1981 (aged 26)	cm / kg	21	0						
20	GK	Nobuhisa Kobayashi	April 11, 1983 (aged 24)	cm / kg	0	0						
21	GK	Koji Ezumi	December 18, 1978 (aged 29)	cm / kg	34	0						
22	DF	Terukazu Tanaka	July 14, 1985 (aged 22)	cm / kg	9	0						
23	MF	Shin Kanazawa	September 9, 1983 (aged 24)	cm / kg	22	0						
24	MF	Takaya Kawanabe	December 22, 1988 (aged 19)	cm / kg	0	0						
25	MF	Tomoya Uchida	July 10, 1983 (aged 24)	cm / kg	16	0						
26	DF	Daiki Niwa	January 16, 1986 (aged 22)	cm / kg	0	0						
27	FW	Masahiko Ichikawa	September 17, 1985 (aged 22)	cm / kg	1	0						
28	MF	Kohei Tokita	March 16, 1986 (aged 21)	cm / kg	22	1						
29	DF	Tatsuya Kawahara	December 16, 1985 (aged 22)	cm / kg	0	0						
30	FW	Naoto Sakurai	September 2, 1975 (aged 32)	cm / kg	3	0						
31	GK	Keiki Shimizu	December 10, 1985 (aged 22)	cm / kg	0	0						
32	MF	Yoshiyuki Kobayashi	January 27, 1978 (aged 30)	cm / kg	25	3						
34	MF	Takuya Aoki	September 16, 1989 (aged 18)	cm / kg	1	0						
35	FW	Daisuke Watabe	April 19, 1989 (aged 18)	cm / kg	0	0						

== Other pages ==
- (in Japanese) J. League official site
