= 2007 Omiya Ardija season =

Omiya Ardija
2007 season
- Manager: Robert Verbeek; Satoru Sakuma
- Stadium: NACK5 Stadium Omiya
- J. League 1: 15th
- Emperor's Cup: Fourth Round
- J. League Cup: GL-B 4th
- Top goalscorer: Kota Yoshihara (5)

During the 2007 season, Omiya Ardija competed in the J. League 1, where they finished 15th. The club also competed in the Emperor's Cup and the J. League Cup.

== Competitions ==
Competitions	Position
J. League 1	15th / 18 clubs
Emperor's Cup	4th Round
J. League Cup	GL-B 4th / 4 clubs

=== J. League 1 ===
==== League table ====
Pos	Team	Pld	W	D	L	GF	GA	GD	Pts	Qualification or relegation
13	JEF United Chiba	34	12	6	16	51	56	−5	42	
14	Oita Trinita	34	12	5	17	42	60	−18	41	
15	Omiya Ardija	34	8	11	15	24	40	−16	35	
16	Sanfrecce Hiroshima (R)	34	8	8	18	44	71	−27	32	2007 promotion/relegation Series
17	Ventforet Kofu (R)	34	7	6	21	33	65	−32	27	Relegation to 2008 J.League Division 2

Updated to match(es) played on December 1, 2007. Source: J. League Division 1
Rules for classification: 1) points; 2) goal difference; 3) number of goals scored.
(R) Relegated

==== Results ====
J.League Division 1 results
Date	Opponent	Venue	Result F–A
3 March 2007	Gamba Osaka	A	0–1
10 March 2007	FC Tokyo	H	0–2
17 March 2007	Oita Trinita	A	1–3
31 March 2007	Shimizu S-Pulse	H	1–2
7 April 2007	Kashima Antlers	A	0–0
14 April 2007	Nagoya Grampus Eight	H	1–0
21 April 2007	JEF United Chiba	A	0–1
28 April 2007	Ventforet Kofu	H	1–2
3 May 2007	Sanfrecce Hiroshima	A	1–2
6 May 2007	Urawa Red Diamonds	H	1–1
13 May 2007	Vissel Kobe	A	0–0
19 May 2007	Yokohama FC	H	1–0
27 May 2007	Kawasaki Frontale	A	1–1
9 June 2007	Kashiwa Reysol	A	0–0
16 June 2007	Albirex Niigata	H	2–1
20 June 2007	Júbilo Iwata	A	0–0
24 June 2007	Yokohama F. Marinos	H	0–0
30 June 2007	Gamba Osaka	H	0–3
11 August 2007	Shimizu S-Pulse	A	2–2
15 August 2007	Vissel Kobe	H	1–3
19 August 2007	Kashima Antlers	H	1–2
25 August 2007	Nagoya Grampus Eight	A	0–5
29 August 2007	Kashiwa Reysol	H	1–1
1 September 2007	Urawa Red Diamonds	A	1–0
15 September 2007	Júbilo Iwata	H	0–2
22 September 2007	JEF United Chiba	H	0–1
29 September 2007	Yokohama F. Marinos	A	2–0
6 October 2007	Albirex Niigata	A	0–1
20 October 2007	Sanfrecce Hiroshima	H	1–0
27 October 2007	Yokohama FC	A	1–0
11 November 2007	Oita Trinita	H	1–2
18 November 2007	Ventforet Kofu	A	0–0
24 November 2007	FC Tokyo	A	2–1
1 December 2007	Kawasaki Frontale	H	1–1

== Player statistics ==
No.	Pos.	Player	D.o.B. (Age)	Height / Weight	J. League 1		Emperor's Cup		J. League Cup		Total	
No.	Pos.	Player	D.o.B. (Age)	Height / Weight	Apps	Goals	Apps	Goals	Apps	Goals	Apps	Goals
1	GK	Hiroki Aratani	6 August 1975 (aged 31)	cm / kg	17	0						
2	DF	Seiichiro Okuno	26 July 1974 (aged 32)	cm / kg	6	0						
3	DF	Leandro	18 August 1981 (aged 25)	cm / kg	28	1						
4	DF	Yasuhiro Hato	4 May 1976 (aged 30)	cm / kg	31	0						
5	DF	Daisuke Tomita	24 April 1977 (aged 29)	cm / kg	31	1						
6	MF	Yosuke Kataoka	26 May 1982 (aged 24)	cm / kg	32	0						
7	MF	Naoya Saeki	18 December 1977 (aged 29)	cm / kg	17	0						
8	MF	Daigo Kobayashi	19 February 1983 (aged 24)	cm / kg	24	2						
9	FW	Kota Yoshihara	2 February 1978 (aged 29)	cm / kg	26	5						
10	FW	Enílton	11 October 1977 (aged 29)	cm / kg	11	0						
11	MF	Chikara Fujimoto	31 October 1977 (aged 29)	cm / kg	31	2						
13	FW	Manabu Wakabayashi	3 June 1979 (aged 27)	cm / kg	13	3						
14	FW	Hiroshi Morita	18 May 1978 (aged 28)	cm / kg	21	2						
15	MF	Masato Saito	1 December 1975 (aged 31)	cm / kg	26	1						
16	FW	Alison	30 June 1982 (aged 24)	cm / kg	2	0						
17	MF	Hayato Hashimoto	15 September 1981 (aged 25)	cm / kg	22	0						
18	DF	Takuro Nishimura	15 August 1977 (aged 29)	cm / kg	24	0						
19	DF	Akira Ishigame	20 May 1985 (aged 21)	cm / kg	0	0						
20	GK	Nobuhisa Kobayashi	11 April 1983 (aged 23)	cm / kg	0	0						
21	GK	Koji Ezumi	18 December 1978 (aged 28)	cm / kg	18	0						
22	DF	Terukazu Tanaka	14 July 1985 (aged 21)	cm / kg	10	0						
23	DF	Haruki Nishimura	31 May 1987 (aged 19)	cm / kg	0	0						
24	MF	Takaya Kawanabe	22 December 1988 (aged 18)	cm / kg	0	0						
25	DF	Yasunari Hiraoka	13 March 1972 (aged 34)	cm / kg	0	0						
26	MF	Yusuke Shimada	19 January 1982 (aged 25)	cm / kg	1	0						
27	FW	Mauricio Salles	1 March 1978 (aged 29)	cm / kg	8	1						
28	MF	Takashi Hirano	15 July 1974 (aged 32)	cm / kg	3	1						
29	FW	Denis Marques	22 February 1981 (aged 26)	cm / kg	13	2						
30	FW	Naoto Sakurai	2 September 1975 (aged 31)	cm / kg	7	0						
31	GK	Kunihiro Shibazaki	1 April 1985 (aged 21)	cm / kg	0	0						
32	MF	Yoshiyuki Kobayashi	27 January 1978 (aged 29)	cm / kg	33	3						
33	FW	Pedro Júnior	29 January 1987 (aged 20)	cm / kg	6	0						
34	DF	Yusuke Murayama	10 June 1981 (aged 25)	cm / kg	7	0						
35	GK	Kota Ogi	5 May 1983 (aged 23)	cm / kg	0	0						

== Other pages ==
- (in Japanese) J. League official site
