= 2009 Omiya Ardija season =

Omiya Ardija
2009 season
- Manager: Chang Woe-Ryong
- Stadium: NACK5 Stadium Omiya
- J. League 1: 13th
- Emperor's Cup: 3rd Round
- J. League Cup: GL-A 5th
- Top goalscorer: Mato Neretljak (8)

2009 Omiya Ardija season

== Competitions ==
Competitions	Position
J. League 1	13th / 18 clubs
Emperor's Cup	3rd Round
J. League Cup	GL-A 5th / 7 clubs

== Player statistics ==
No.	Pos.	Player	D.o.B. (Age)	Height / Weight	J. League 1		Emperor's Cup		J. League Cup		Total	
No.	Pos.	Player	D.o.B. (Age)	Height / Weight	Apps	Goals	Apps	Goals	Apps	Goals	Apps	Goals
1	GK	Takahiro Takagi	July 1, 1982 (aged 26)	cm / kg	0	0						
2	DF	Taishi Tsukamoto	July 4, 1985 (aged 23)	cm / kg	21	2						
3	DF	Mato Neretljak	June 3, 1979 (aged 29)	cm / kg	33	8						
4	DF	Yasuhiro Hato	May 4, 1976 (aged 32)	cm / kg	30	0						
5	DF	Daisuke Tomita	April 24, 1977 (aged 31)	cm / kg	21	1						
6	MF	Yosuke Kataoka	May 26, 1982 (aged 26)	cm / kg	26	0						
7	MF	Tomoya Uchida	July 10, 1983 (aged 25)	cm / kg	22	3						
9	FW	Naoki Ishihara	August 14, 1984 (aged 24)	cm / kg	32	7						
10	FW	Denis Marques	February 22, 1981 (aged 28)	cm / kg	9	1						
11	MF	Chikara Fujimoto	October 31, 1977 (aged 31)	cm / kg	31	3						
13	FW	Yoshihito Fujita	April 13, 1983 (aged 25)	cm / kg	27	4						
14	MF	Park Won-Jae	May 28, 1984 (aged 24)	cm / kg	21	1						
15	MF	Masato Saito	December 1, 1975 (aged 33)	cm / kg	4	0						
16	FW	Klemen Lavrič	June 12, 1981 (aged 27)	cm / kg	3	0						
16	FW	Rafael Mariano	May 27, 1983 (aged 25)	cm / kg	14	4						
17	MF	Hayato Hashimoto	September 15, 1981 (aged 27)	cm / kg	33	2						
18	FW	Dudu	February 2, 1980 (aged 29)	cm / kg	8	0						
19	DF	Yusuke Murayama	June 10, 1981 (aged 27)	cm / kg	2	0						
20	GK	Nobuhisa Kobayashi	April 11, 1983 (aged 25)	cm / kg	0	0						
21	GK	Koji Ezumi	December 18, 1978 (aged 30)	cm / kg	34	0						
23	MF	Shin Kanazawa	September 9, 1983 (aged 25)	cm / kg	29	0						
24	MF	Takaya Kawanabe	December 22, 1988 (aged 20)	cm / kg	0	0						
25	MF	Kohei Tokita	March 16, 1986 (aged 22)	cm / kg	26	2						
26	MF	Takuya Aoki	September 16, 1989 (aged 19)	cm / kg	4	0						
27	FW	Masahiko Ichikawa	September 17, 1985 (aged 23)	cm / kg	9	1						
28	DF	Shunsuke Fukuda	April 17, 1986 (aged 22)	cm / kg	3	0						
29	DF	Haruki Nishimura	May 31, 1987 (aged 21)	cm / kg	0	0						
30	FW	Daisuke Watabe	April 19, 1989 (aged 19)	cm / kg	6	0						
31	GK	Keiki Shimizu	December 10, 1985 (aged 23)	cm / kg	0	0						
32	MF	Yoshiyuki Kobayashi	January 27, 1978 (aged 31)	cm / kg	5	0						
33	MF	Ryohei Arai	November 3, 1990 (aged 18)	cm / kg	5	0						
34	MF	Seo Yong-Duk	September 10, 1989 (aged 19)	cm / kg	4	0						

== Other pages ==
- (in Japanese) J. League official site
