= 2006 Omiya Ardija season =

Omiya Ardija
2006 season
- Manager: Toshiya Miura
- Stadium: Omiya Football Stadium
- J.League 1: 12th
- Emperor's Cup: 5th Round
- J.League Cup: GL-D 4th
- Top goalscorer: Daigo Kobayashi (9)

2006 Omiya Ardija season

== Competitions ==
Competitions	Position
J.League 1	12th / 18 clubs
Emperor's Cup	5th round
J.League Cup	GL-D 4th / 5 clubs

== Domestic results ==
=== J.League 1 ===
Match	Date	Venue	Opponents	Score
1	2006..			-
2	2006..			-
3	2006..			-
4	2006..			-
5	2006..			-
6	2006..			-
7	2006..			-
8	2006..			-
9	2006..			-
10	2006..			-
11	2006..			-
12	2006..			-
13	2006..			-
14	2006..			-
15	2006..			-
16	2006..			-
17	2006..			-
18	2006..			-
19	2006..			-
20	2006..			-
21	2006..			-
22	2006..			-
23	2006..			-
24	2006..			-
25	2006..			-
26	2006..			-
27	2006..			-
28	2006..			-
29	2006..			-
30	2006..			-
31	2006..			-
32	2006..			-
33	2006..			-
34	2006..			-

=== Emperor's Cup ===
Match	Date	Venue	Opponents	Score
4th round	2006..			-
5th round	2006..			-

=== J.League Cup ===
Match	Date	Venue	Opponents	Score
GL-D-1	2006..			-
GL-D-2	2006..			-
GL-D-3	2006..			-
GL-D-4	2006..			-
GL-D-5	2006..			-
GL-D-6	2006..			-

== Player statistics ==
No.	Pos.	Player	D.o.B. (Age)	Height / Weight	J.League 1		Emperor's Cup		J.League Cup		Total	
No.	Pos.	Player	D.o.B. (Age)	Height / Weight	Apps	Goals	Apps	Goals	Apps	Goals	Apps	Goals
1	GK	Tomoyasu Ando	May 23, 1974 (aged 31)	cm / kg	0	0						
2	DF	Seiichiro Okuno	July 26, 1974 (aged 31)	cm / kg	11	0						
3	DF	Kazuyoshi Mikami	August 29, 1975 (aged 30)	cm / kg	2	0						
4	DF	Toninho	December 21, 1977 (aged 28)	cm / kg	31	3						
5	DF	Daisuke Tomita	April 24, 1977 (aged 28)	cm / kg	31	2						
6	MF	Jun Marques Davidson	June 7, 1983 (aged 22)	cm / kg	20	0						
7	MF	Naoya Saeki	December 18, 1977 (aged 28)	cm / kg	1	0						
8	MF	Daigo Kobayashi	February 19, 1983 (aged 23)	cm / kg	33	9						
9	FW	Kota Yoshihara	February 2, 1978 (aged 28)	cm / kg	15	2						
10	FW	Saul Martínez	January 29, 1976 (aged 30)	cm / kg	3	0						
11	MF	Chikara Fujimoto	October 31, 1977 (aged 28)	cm / kg	20	3						
13	DF	Yasunari Hiraoka	March 13, 1972 (aged 33)	cm / kg	3	0						
14	FW	Hiroshi Morita	May 18, 1978 (aged 27)	cm / kg	30	3						
15	MF	Masato Saito	December 1, 1975 (aged 30)	cm / kg	25	0						
16	MF	Tatsunori Hisanaga	December 23, 1977 (aged 28)	cm / kg	29	3						
17	DF	Yukio Tsuchiya	July 31, 1974 (aged 31)	cm / kg	31	1						
18	DF	Takuro Nishimura	August 15, 1977 (aged 28)	cm / kg	12	0						
19	MF	Yosuke Kataoka	May 26, 1982 (aged 23)	cm / kg	28	2						
20	GK	Hiroki Aratani	August 6, 1975 (aged 30)	cm / kg	31	0						
21	GK	Koji Ezumi	December 18, 1978 (aged 27)	cm / kg	3	0						
22	DF	Yasuhiro Hato	May 4, 1976 (aged 29)	cm / kg	28	0						
24	MF	Hayato Hashimoto	September 15, 1981 (aged 24)	cm / kg	15	2						
25	DF	Terukazu Tanaka	July 14, 1985 (aged 20)	cm / kg	0	0						
26	DF	Akira Ishigame	May 20, 1985 (aged 20)	cm / kg	0	0						
27	FW	Manabu Wakabayashi	June 3, 1979 (aged 26)	cm / kg	9	0						
28	DF	Haruki Nishimura	May 31, 1987 (aged 18)	cm / kg	0	0						
29	FW	Alison	June 30, 1982 (aged 23)	cm / kg	8	1						
30	FW	Naoto Sakurai	September 2, 1975 (aged 30)	cm / kg	21	5						
31	GK	Nobuhisa Kobayashi	April 11, 1983 (aged 22)	cm / kg	0	0						
32	MF	Yoshiyuki Kobayashi	January 27, 1978 (aged 28)	cm / kg	28	4						
33	FW	Rodrigo Gral	February 21, 1977 (aged 29)	cm / kg	7	2						

== Other pages ==
- (in Japanese) J. League official site
