= 2010 Omiya Ardija season =

Omiya Ardija
2010 season
- Manager: Chang Woe-Ryong
- Stadium: NACK5 Stadium Omiya
- J. League 1: 12th
- Emperor's Cup: 4th Round
- J. League Cup: GL-A 5th
- Top goalscorer: Naoki Ishihara (9)

2010 Omiya Ardija season

== Competitions ==
Competitions	Position
J. League 1	12th / 18 clubs
Emperor's Cup	4th Round
J. League Cup	GL-A 5th / 7 clubs

=== J. League 1 ===
Pos	Team	Pld	W	D	L	GF	GA	GD	Pts
10	Urawa Red Diamonds	34	14	6	14	48	41	+7	48
11	Júbilo Iwata	34	11	11	12	38	49	−11	44
12	Omiya Ardija	34	11	9	14	39	45	−6	42
13	Montedio Yamagata	34	11	9	14	29	42	−13	42
14	Vegalta Sendai	34	10	9	15	40	46	−6	39

Updated to match(es) played on December 4, 2010. Source: J.League Division 1
Rules for classification: 1) points; 2) goal difference; 3) number of goals scored.

== Player statistics ==
No.	Pos.	Player	D.o.B. (Age)	Height / Weight	J. League 1		Emperor's Cup		J. League Cup		Total	
No.	Pos.	Player	D.o.B. (Age)	Height / Weight	Apps	Goals	Apps	Goals	Apps	Goals	Apps	Goals
1	GK	Takashi Kitano	October 4, 1982 (aged 27)	cm / kg	34	0						
2	DF	Taishi Tsukamoto	July 4, 1985 (aged 24)	cm / kg	0	0						
3	DF	Mato Neretljak	June 3, 1979 (aged 30)	cm / kg	26	3						
4	DF	Yuki Fukaya	August 1, 1982 (aged 27)	cm / kg	25	6						
5	MF	An Yong-Hak	October 25, 1978 (aged 31)	cm / kg	17	0						
6	MF	Takuya Aoki	September 16, 1989 (aged 20)	cm / kg	26	0						
7	MF	Tomoya Uchida	July 10, 1983 (aged 26)	cm / kg	9	0						
9	FW	Naoki Ishihara	August 14, 1984 (aged 25)	cm / kg	33	9						
10	FW	Rafael Mariano	May 27, 1983 (aged 26)	cm / kg	23	8						
11	MF	Chikara Fujimoto	October 31, 1977 (aged 32)	cm / kg	25	0						
13	FW	Yoshihito Fujita	April 13, 1983 (aged 26)	cm / kg	7	1						
14	DF	Shusuke Tsubouchi	May 5, 1983 (aged 26)	cm / kg	26	2						
16	FW	Lee Chun-Soo	July 9, 1981 (aged 28)	cm / kg	16	2						
17	MF	Hayato Hashimoto	September 15, 1981 (aged 28)	cm / kg	19	1						
18	FW	Dudu	February 2, 1980 (aged 30)	cm / kg	4	0						
18	MF	Lee Ho	October 22, 1984 (aged 25)	cm / kg	15	1						
19	FW	Masahiko Ichikawa	September 17, 1985 (aged 24)	cm / kg	23	0						
20	GK	Daisuke Tada	August 11, 1982 (aged 27)	cm / kg	0	0						
21	GK	Koji Ezumi	December 18, 1978 (aged 31)	cm / kg	0	0						
22	MF	Jun Kanakubo	July 26, 1987 (aged 22)	cm / kg	19	2						
23	MF	Shin Kanazawa	September 9, 1983 (aged 26)	cm / kg	29	0						
24	MF	Norio Suzuki	February 14, 1984 (aged 26)	cm / kg	19	1						
25	MF	Kohei Tokita	March 16, 1986 (aged 23)	cm / kg	3	0						
26	MF	Kazuhiro Murakami	January 20, 1981 (aged 29)	cm / kg	29	3						
27	MF	Masakazu Kihara	April 19, 1987 (aged 22)	cm / kg	1	0						
28	DF	Shunsuke Fukuda	April 17, 1986 (aged 23)	cm / kg	7	0						
29	MF	Seo Yong-Duk	September 10, 1989 (aged 20)	cm / kg	1	0						
30	FW	Daisuke Watabe	April 19, 1989 (aged 20)	cm / kg	16	0						
31	GK	Keiki Shimizu	December 10, 1985 (aged 24)	cm / kg	0	0						
32	DF	Arata Sugiyama	July 25, 1980 (aged 29)	cm / kg	23	0						
33	MF	Ryohei Arai	November 3, 1990 (aged 19)	cm / kg	0	0						
34	MF	Taisuke Miyazaki	May 5, 1992 (aged 17)	cm / kg	1	0						

== Other pages ==
- (in Japanese) J. League official site
