= 2005 Omiya Ardija season =

Omiya Ardija
2005 season
- Manager: Toshiya Miura
- Stadium: Omiya Football Stadium
- J.League 1: 13th
- Emperor's Cup: Semifinals
- J.League Cup: Quarterfinals
- Top goalscorer: Tuto (7)

During the 2005 season, Omiya Ardija competed in the J.League 1, in which they finished 13th.

== Competitions ==
Competitions	Position
J.League 1	13th / 18 clubs
Emperor's Cup	Semifinals
J.League Cup	Quarterfinals

== Domestic results ==
=== J.League 1 ===
Match	Date	Venue	Opponents	Score
1	2005..			-
2	2005..			-
3	2005..			-
4	2005..			-
5	2005..			-
6	2005..			-
7	2005..			-
8	2005..			-
9	2005..			-
10	2005..			-
11	2005..			-
12	2005..			-
13	2005..			-
14	2005..			-
15	2005..			-
16	2005..			-
17	2005..			-
18	2005..			-
19	2005..			-
20	2005..			-
21	2005..			-
22	2005..			-
23	2005..			-
24	2005..			-
25	2005..			-
26	2005..			-
27	2005..			-
28	2005..			-
29	2005..			-
30	2005..			-
31	2005..			-
32	2005..			-
33	2005..			-
34	2005..			-

=== Emperor's Cup ===
Match	Date	Venue	Opponents	Score
4th round	2005..			-
5th round	2005..			-
Quarterfinals	2005..			-
Semifinals	2005..			-

=== J.League Cup ===
Match	Date	Venue	Opponents	Score
GL-A-1	2005..			-
GL-A-2	2005..			-
GL-A-3	2005..			-
GL-A-4	2005..			-
GL-A-5	2005..			-
GL-A-6	2005..			-
Quarterfinals-1	2005..			-
Quarterfinals-2	2005..			-

== Player statistics ==
No.	Pos.	Player	D.o.B. (Age)	Height / Weight	J.League 1		Emperor's Cup		J.League Cup		Total	
No.	Pos.	Player	D.o.B. (Age)	Height / Weight	Apps	Goals	Apps	Goals	Apps	Goals	Apps	Goals
1	GK	Tomoyasu Ando	May 23, 1974 (aged 30)	cm / kg	3	0						
2	DF	Seiichiro Okuno	July 26, 1974 (aged 30)	cm / kg	27	0						
3	DF	Kazuyoshi Mikami	August 29, 1975 (aged 29)	cm / kg	20	0						
4	DF	Toninho	December 21, 1977 (aged 27)	cm / kg	31	5						
5	DF	Daisuke Tomita	April 24, 1977 (aged 27)	cm / kg	32	0						
6	MF	Jun Marques Davidson	June 7, 1983 (aged 21)	cm / kg	30	0						
7	MF	Shin Kanazawa	September 9, 1983 (aged 21)	cm / kg	17	0						
8	DF	Masahiro Ando	April 2, 1972 (aged 32)	cm / kg	4	0						
9	FW	Christian	April 23, 1975 (aged 29)	cm / kg	15	6						
10	FW	Tuto	July 2, 1978 (aged 26)	cm / kg	25	7						
11	MF	Chikara Fujimoto	October 31, 1977 (aged 27)	cm / kg	29	4						
13	DF	Yasunari Hiraoka	March 13, 1972 (aged 32)	cm / kg	16	0						
14	FW	Hiroshi Morita	May 18, 1978 (aged 26)	cm / kg	29	5						
15	MF	Masato Saito	December 1, 1975 (aged 29)	cm / kg	21	0						
16	MF	Tatsunori Hisanaga	December 23, 1977 (aged 27)	cm / kg	32	3						
17	MF	Yusuke Shimada	January 19, 1982 (aged 23)	cm / kg	14	1						
18	DF	Takuro Nishimura	August 15, 1977 (aged 27)	cm / kg	31	1						
19	MF	Yosuke Kataoka	May 26, 1982 (aged 22)	cm / kg	8	0						
20	GK	Hiroki Aratani	August 6, 1975 (aged 29)	cm / kg	31	0						
21	GK	Takahiro Takagi	July 1, 1982 (aged 22)	cm / kg	0	0						
22	GK	Kenji Tanaka	December 13, 1983 (aged 21)	cm / kg	0	0						
23	MF	Shota Suzuki	July 3, 1984 (aged 20)	cm / kg	1	0						
24	MF	Hayato Hashimoto	September 15, 1981 (aged 23)	cm / kg	1	0						
25	DF	Terukazu Tanaka	July 14, 1985 (aged 19)	cm / kg	0	0						
26	FW	Tomoya Osawa	October 22, 1984 (aged 20)	cm / kg	0	0						
27	FW	Satoshi Yokoyama	February 14, 1980 (aged 25)	cm / kg	19	1						
28	DF	Masateru Tsujita	August 3, 1984 (aged 20)	cm / kg	0	0						
29	DF	Akira Ishigame	May 20, 1985 (aged 19)	cm / kg	0	0						
30	FW	Naoto Sakurai	September 2, 1975 (aged 29)	cm / kg	19	4						
31	FW	Yoshiteru Yamashita	November 21, 1977 (aged 27)	cm / kg	5	0						
32	FW	Leandro	February 12, 1985 (aged 20)	cm / kg	7	1						
33	FW	Manabu Wakabayashi	June 3, 1979 (aged 25)	cm / kg	4	0						

== Other pages ==
- (in Japanese) J. League official site
