= 2004 Omiya Ardija season =

Omiya Ardija
2004 season
- Manager: Toshiya Miura
- Stadium: Omiya Football Stadium
- J.League 2: 2nd
- Emperor's Cup: 5th Round
- Top goalscorer: Baré (15)
Home colours	Away colours

2004 Omiya Ardija season. At the end of the season, the team finished second in the league and were promoted to the J. League Division 1, where they would remain for the next 9 years.

== Competitions ==
Competitions	Position
J.League 2	2nd / 12 clubs
Emperor's Cup	5th round

== Domestic results ==
=== J.League 2 ===
Match	Date	Venue	Opponents	Score
1	2004..			-
2	2004..			-
3	2004..			-
4	2004..			-
5	2004..			-
6	2004..			-
7	2004..			-
8	2004..			-
9	2004..			-
10	2004..			-
11	2004..			-
12	2004..			-
13	2004..			-
14	2004..			-
15	2004..			-
16	2004..			-
17	2004..			-
18	2004..			-
19	2004..			-
20	2004..			-
21	2004..			-
22	2004..			-
23	2004..			-
24	2004..			-
25	2004..			-
26	2004..			-
27	2004..			-
28	2004..			-
29	2004..			-
30	2004..			-
31	2004..			-
32	2004..			-
33	2004..			-
34	2004..			-
35	2004..			-
36	2004..			-
37	2004..			-
38	2004..			-
39	2004..			-
40	2004..			-
41	2004..			-
42	2004..			-
43	2004..			-
44	2004..			-

=== Emperor's Cup ===
Match	Date	Venue	Opponents	Score
3rd round	2004..			-
4th round	2004..			-
5th round	2004..			-

== Player statistics ==
No.	Pos.	Player	D.o.B. (Age)	Height / Weight	J.League 2		Emperor's Cup		Total	
No.	Pos.	Player	D.o.B. (Age)	Height / Weight	Apps	Goals	Apps	Goals	Apps	Goals
1	GK	Tomoyasu Ando	May 23, 1974 (aged 29)	cm / kg	17	0				
2	DF	Seiichiro Okuno	July 26, 1974 (aged 29)	cm / kg	44	2				
3	DF	Daiki Wakamatsu	August 2, 1976 (aged 27)	cm / kg	27	0				
4	DF	Toninho	December 21, 1977 (aged 26)	cm / kg	40	4				
5	DF	Daisuke Tomita	April 24, 1977 (aged 26)	cm / kg	43	4				
6	MF	Tetsuhiro Kina	December 10, 1976 (aged 27)	cm / kg	15	0				
7	MF	Hideyuki Ujiie	February 23, 1979 (aged 25)	cm / kg	17	0				
8	DF	Masahiro Ando	April 2, 1972 (aged 31)	cm / kg	44	1				
9	FW	Yutaka Takahashi	September 29, 1980 (aged 23)	cm / kg	20	2				
10	FW	Daniel Bueno	December 15, 1983 (aged 20)	cm / kg	5	0				
10	FW	Tuto	July 2, 1978 (aged 25)	cm / kg	24	8				
11	FW	Baré	January 18, 1982 (aged 22)	cm / kg	41	15				
13	DF	Kosuke Kitani	October 9, 1978 (aged 25)	cm / kg	18	1				
14	DF	Kohei Morita	July 13, 1976 (aged 27)	cm / kg	3	0				
15	MF	Masato Saito	December 1, 1975 (aged 28)	cm / kg	43	2				
16	MF	Tatsunori Hisanaga	December 23, 1977 (aged 26)	cm / kg	40	2				
17	MF	Yusuke Shimada	January 19, 1982 (aged 22)	cm / kg	27	3				
18	DF	Daiju Matsumoto	December 9, 1977 (aged 26)	cm / kg	1	0				
19	DF	Hiroyuki Omata	September 1, 1983 (aged 20)	cm / kg	0	0				
20	GK	Hiroki Aratani	August 6, 1975 (aged 28)	cm / kg	27	0				
21	GK	Takahiro Takagi	July 1, 1982 (aged 21)	cm / kg	0	0				
22	GK	Kenji Tanaka	December 13, 1983 (aged 20)	cm / kg	0	0				
23	MF	Shin Kanazawa	September 9, 1983 (aged 20)	cm / kg	41	4				
24	MF	Hayato Hashimoto	September 15, 1981 (aged 22)	cm / kg	0	0				
25	MF	Yusuke Tanno	June 17, 1983 (aged 20)	cm / kg	0	0				
26	MF	Jun Marques Davidson	June 7, 1983 (aged 20)	cm / kg	17	1				
27	FW	Satoshi Yokoyama	February 14, 1980 (aged 24)	cm / kg	16	3				
28	DF	Masateru Tsujita	August 3, 1984 (aged 19)	cm / kg	0	0				
29	DF	Akira Ishigame	May 20, 1985 (aged 18)	cm / kg	0	0				
30	FW	Tomoya Osawa	October 22, 1984 (aged 19)	cm / kg	0	0				
31	MF	Shota Suzuki	July 3, 1984 (aged 19)	cm / kg	0	0				
32	DF	Terukazu Tanaka	July 14, 1985 (aged 18)	cm / kg	0	0				
33	DF	Yasunari Hiraoka	March 13, 1972 (aged 32)	cm / kg	4	0				
34	FW	Hiroshi Morita	May 18, 1978 (aged 25)	cm / kg	21	10				
35	DF	Takuro Nishimura	August 15, 1977 (aged 26)	cm / kg	15	0				

== Other pages ==
- (in Japanese) J. League official site
