= Koji Ezumi =

Japanese footballer

Koji Ezumi 江角 浩司
Personal information
- Full name: Koji Ezumi
- Date of birth: December 18, 1978 (age 47)
- Place of birth: Izumo, Shimane, Japan
- Height: 1.91 m (6 ft 3 in)
- Position: Goalkeeper

Youth career
- Izumo Technical High School
- Osaka University of Health and Sport Sciences

Senior career*
Years	Team	Apps	(Gls)
2002–2005	Oita Trinita	10	(0)
2006–2014	Omiya Ardija	117	(0)
2015–2016	Kataller Toyama	23	(0)
Total		150	(0)
- * Club domestic league appearances and goals

Koji Ezumi (江角 浩司, Ezumi Kōji; born December 18, 1978) is a former Japanese football player.

== Playing career ==
Ezumi was born in Izumo on December 18, 1978. After graduating from Osaka University of Health and Sport Sciences, he joined the J2 League club Oita Trinita in 2002. Although Trinita won the championship of the 2002 season and was promoted to the J1 League, he played in fewer games than Hayato Okanaka and Riki Takasaki. He became a regular goalkeeper in April 2004. However he lost his position behind newcomer Shusaku Nishikawa in May. In 2006, he moved to the J1 club Omiya Ardija. He became a regular goalkeeper in place of Hiroki Aratani in June 2007 and played all 34 matches in 2008 and 2009. However he lost his position to Takashi Kitano in 2010 and he did not play again until 2014. In 2015, he moved to the newly demoted J3 League club, Kataller Toyama. Although he became a regular goalkeeper, he lost his position to Tatsumi Iida in July. He retired at the end of the 2016 season.

== Career statistics ==
Appearances and goals by club, season and competition
Club	Season	League			Emperor's Cup		J.League Cup		Total	
Club	Season	Division	Apps	Goals	Apps	Goals	Apps	Goals	Apps	Goals
Oita Trinita	2002	J2 League	0	0	1	0	—		1	0
Oita Trinita	2003	J1 League	2	0	0	0	2	0	4	0
Oita Trinita	2004	J1 League	0	0	0	0	0	0	0	0
Oita Trinita	2005	J1 League	8	0	0	0	4	0	12	0
Oita Trinita	Total		10	0	1	0	6	0	17	0
Omiya Ardija	2006	J1 League	3	0	0	0	1	0	4	0
Omiya Ardija	2007	J1 League	18	0	0	0	3	0	21	0
Omiya Ardija	2008	J1 League	34	0	2	0	3	0	39	0
Omiya Ardija	2009	J1 League	34	0	2	0	1	0	37	0
Omiya Ardija	2010	J1 League	0	0	1	0	2	0	3	0
Omiya Ardija	2011	J1 League	0	0	0	0	2	0	2	0
Omiya Ardija	2012	J1 League	11	0	0	0	3	0	14	0
Omiya Ardija	2013	J1 League	5	0	0	0	2	0	7	0
Omiya Ardija	2014	J1 League	12	0	0	0	3	0	15	0
Omiya Ardija	Total		117	0	5	0	20	0	142	0
Kataller Toyama	2015	J3 League	20	0	—		—		20	0
Kataller Toyama	2016	J3 League	3	0	0	0	—		3	0
Kataller Toyama	Total		23	0	0	0	—		23	0
Career total			150	0	6	0	26	0	182	0
