= Tomoyasu Ando =

Japanese footballer

Tomoyasu Ando 安藤 智安
Personal information
- Full name: Tomoyasu Ando
- Date of birth: May 23, 1974 (age 52)
- Place of birth: Shizuoka, Japan
- Height: 1.82 m (5 ft 11 1/2 in)
- Position: Goalkeeper

Youth career
- 1990–1992: Shimizu Shogyo High School

College career
| Years | Team | Apps | (Gls) |
| 1993–1996 | Komazawa University | | |

Senior career*
| Years | Team | Apps | (Gls) |
| 1997–2002 | Urawa Reds | 10 | (0) |
| 1997 | → Avispa Fukuoka (loan) | 7 | (0) |
| 2002–2006 | Omiya Ardija | 56 | (0) |
| Total | | 73 | (0) |
Medal record
Urawa Reds
| Runner-up | J.League Cup | 2002 |
- * Club domestic league appearances and goals

Tomoyasu Ando (安藤 智安, Andō Tomoyasu; born May 23, 1974) is a former Japanese football player.

== Playing career ==
Ando was born in Shizuoka Prefecture on May 23, 1974. After graduating from Komazawa University, he joined J1 League club Urawa Reds in 1997. In September, he moved to Avispa Fukuoka on loan and played many matches. In 1998, he returned to Urawa Reds. However he could hardly play in the match behind Yuki Takita and Hisashi Tsuchida until 2000. From 2001, although Takita and Tsuchida retired, Ando could not play many matches behind young goalkeeper Yohei Nishibe and Norihiro Yamagishi. In July 2002, he moved to J2 League club Omiya Ardija. He battles with Eiji Kawashima and Hiroki Aratani for the position and he played many matches. The club also won the 2nd place in 2004 and was promoted to J1 from 2005. However he could hardly play in the match behind Aratani from 2005 and he retired end of 2006 season.

== Career statistics ==
Appearances and goals by club, season and competition
| Club | Season | League | | | Emperor's Cup | | J.League Cup | | Total | |
| Club | Season | Division | Apps | Goals | Apps | Goals | Apps | Goals | Apps | Goals |
|---|---|---|---|---|---|---|---|---|---|---|
| Urawa Reds | 1997 | J1 League | 0 | 0 | 0 | 0 | 0 | 0 | 0 | 0 |
| Avispa Fukuoka | 1997 | J1 League | 7 | 0 | 0 | 0 | 0 | 0 | 7 | 0 |
| Urawa Reds | 1998 | J1 League | 0 | 0 | 0 | 0 | 0 | 0 | 0 | 0 |
| Urawa Reds | 1999 | J1 League | 0 | 0 | 0 | 0 | 0 | 0 | 0 | 0 |
| Urawa Reds | 2000 | J2 League | 1 | 0 | 2 | 0 | 1 | 0 | 4 | 0 |
| Urawa Reds | 2001 | J1 League | 9 | 0 | 0 | 0 | 4 | 0 | 13 | 0 |
| Urawa Reds | 2002 | J1 League | 0 | 0 | 0 | 0 | 0 | 0 | 0 | 0 |
| Omiya Ardija | 2002 | J2 League | 23 | 0 | 0 | 0 | — | | 23 | 0 |
| Omiya Ardija | 2003 | J2 League | 13 | 0 | 0 | 0 | — | | 13 | 0 |
| Omiya Ardija | 2004 | J2 League | 17 | 0 | 1 | 0 | — | | 18 | 0 |
| Omiya Ardija | 2005 | J1 League | 3 | 0 | 2 | 0 | 1 | 0 | 6 | 0 |
| Omiya Ardija | 2006 | J1 League | 0 | 0 | 0 | 0 | 1 | 0 | 1 | 0 |
| Career total | | | 73 | 0 | 8 | 0 | 7 | 0 | 88 | 0 |
