= Chikara Fujimoto =

Japanese footballer

Chikara Fujimoto 藤本 主税
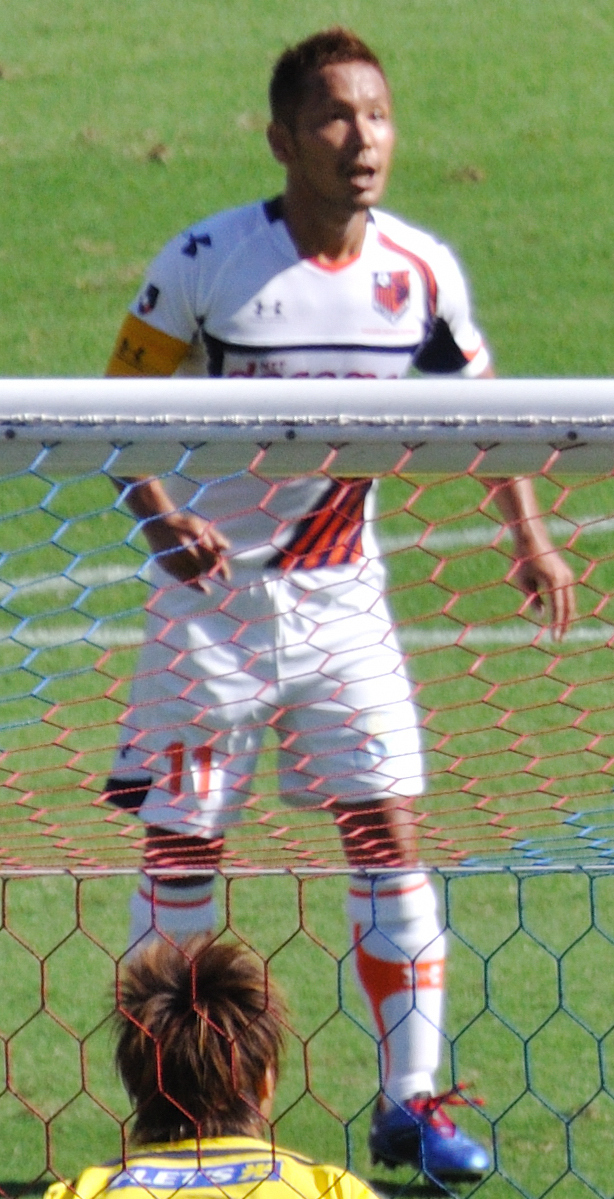

Personal information
- Full name: Chikara Fujimoto
- Date of birth: October 31, 1977 (age 48)
- Place of birth: Ube, Yamaguchi, Japan
- Height: 1.68 m (5 ft 6 in)
- Position: Midfielder

Youth career
- 1984–1989: Kuwajima Elementary School
- 1990–1992: Naruto Daini Junior High School
- 1993–1995: Tokushima Ichiritsu High School

Senior career*
Years	Team	Apps	(Gls)
1996–1998	Avispa Fukuoka	41	(6)
1999–2002	Sanfrecce Hiroshima	111	(20)
2003	Nagoya Grampus Eight	23	(2)
2004	Vissel Kobe	20	(1)
2005–2011	Omiya Ardija	190	(15)
2012–2014	Roasso Kumamoto	52	(3)
Total		437	(47)

International career
2001	Japan	2	(0)

Managerial career
- 2025-2026: AC Nagano Parceiro
Medal record
Sanfrecce Hiroshima
Runner-up	Emperor's Cup	1999
- * Club domestic league appearances and goals

Chikara Fujimoto (藤本 主税, Fujimoto Chikara; born October 31, 1977) is a former Japanese football player. He played twice for Japan national team.

== Club career ==
Fujimoto was born in Ube on October 31, 1977. After graduating from high school, he joined Avispa Fukuoka in 1996. He played many matches in 1998. He moved to Sanfrecce Hiroshima in 1999. The club won second place in the 1999 Emperor's Cup. However the club was relegated to the J2 League in 2002. After that, although he played for Nagoya Grampus Eight in 2003 and Vissel Kobe in 2004, his opportunity to play decreased. In 2005, he moved to Omiya Ardija. He played central player at the club and also served as captain. He moved to Roasso Kumamoto in 2012. He retired at the end of the 2014 season.

== National team career ==
On July 1, 2001, Fujimoto debuted for Japan national team against Paraguay. He played 2 games for Japan in 2001.

== Club statistics ==
Club performance			League		Cup		League Cup		Total	
Season	Club	League	Apps	Goals	Apps	Goals	Apps	Goals	Apps	Goals
Japan			League		Emperor's Cup		J.League Cup		Total	
1996	Avispa Fukuoka	J1 League	10	0	1	0	1	1	12	1
1997	Avispa Fukuoka	J1 League	1	0	2	0	0	0	3	0
1998	Avispa Fukuoka	J1 League	30	6	1	0	0	0	31	6
1999	Sanfrecce Hiroshima	J1 League	27	5	5	5	4	2	36	12
2000	Sanfrecce Hiroshima	J1 League	27	2	2	1	3	1	32	4
2001	Sanfrecce Hiroshima	J1 League	28	9	2	0	5	1	35	10
2002	Sanfrecce Hiroshima	J1 League	29	4	0	0	5	2	34	6
2003	Nagoya Grampus Eight	J1 League	23	2	2	0	5	0	30	2
2004	Vissel Kobe	J1 League	20	1	1	1	6	0	27	2
2005	Omiya Ardija	J1 League	29	4	3	1	8	1	40	6
2006	Omiya Ardija	J1 League	20	3	2	0	5	0	27	3
2007	Omiya Ardija	J1 League	31	2	0	0	6	1	37	3
2008	Omiya Ardija	J1 League	28	3	2	0	2	0	32	3
2009	Omiya Ardija	J1 League	31	3	1	0	6	0	38	3
2010	Omiya Ardija	J1 League	25	0	1	0	0	0	26	0
2011	Omiya Ardija	J1 League	26	0	1	0	1	0	28	0
2012	Roasso Kumamoto	J2 League	21	1	2	0	-		23	1
2013	Roasso Kumamoto	J2 League	24	2	2	0	-		26	2
2014	Roasso Kumamoto	J2 League	7	0	1	0	-		8	0
Total			437	47	31	8	57	9	525	64

== National team statistics ==
Japan national team
Year	Apps	Goals
2001	2	0
Total	2	0
