= Tuto =

Brazilian footballer (born 1979)

Personal information
- Full name: Livonir Ruschel
- Date of birth: 2 July 1979 (age 47)
- Place of birth: Dionísio Cerqueira, Brazil
- Height: 1.82 m (6 ft 0 in)
- Position: Forward

Senior career*
Years	Team	Apps	(Gls)
1997–1998	Glória		
1998–1999	Kawasaki Frontale	45	(27)
2000	FC Tokyo	29	(17)
2001–2002	Urawa Reds	47	(17)
2003	Shimizu S-Pulse	20	(6)
2004–2005	Omiya Ardija	49	(15)
2006	Ponte Preta	31	(11)
2007	Beitar Jerusalem	8	(1)
2007	São Caetano	16	(5)
2008	Sertãozinho		
2008–2009	Shonan Bellmare	22	(8)
2010	Chapecoense		
- * Club domestic league appearances and goals

Livonir Ruschel, known as Tuto (born 2 July 1979) is a Brazilian former professional footballer.

== Club statistics ==
Club performance			League		Cup		League Cup		Continental		Total	
Season	Club	League	Apps	Goals	Apps	Goals	Apps	Goals	Apps	Goals	Apps	Goals
Japan			League		Emperor's Cup		J.League Cup		Asia		Total	
1998	Kawasaki Frontale	Football League	15	10	3	4	-		-		18	14
1999	Kawasaki Frontale	J2 League	30	17	2	1	2	1	-		34	19
2000	FC Tokyo	J1 League	29	17	1	0	2	1	-		32	18
2001	Urawa Reds	J1 League	24	8	4	2	4	4	-		32	14
2002	Urawa Reds	J1 League	23	9	1	0	8	5	-		32	14
2003	Shimizu S-Pulse	J1 League	20	6	4	2	3	1	2	0	29	9
2004	Omiya Ardija	J2 League	24	8	1	0	-		-		25	8
2005	Omiya Ardija	J1 League	25	7	1	0	7	1	-		33	8
Brazil			League		Copa do Brasil		League Cup		South America		Total	
2006	Ponte Preta	Série A	31	11							31	11
Israel			League		State Cup		Toto Cup		Europe		Total	
2006/07	Beitar Jerusalem	Premier League	8	1							8	1
Brazil			League		Copa do Brasil		League Cup		South America		Total	
2007	São Caetano	Série B	16	5							16	5
2008	Sertãozinho											
Japan			League		Emperor's Cup		J.League Cup		Asia		Total	
2008	Shonan Bellmare	J2 League	7	5	0	0	-		-		7	5
2009	Shonan Bellmare	J2 League	15	3	0	0	-		-		15	3
Brazil			League		Copa do Brasil		League Cup		South America		Total	
2010	Chapecoense	Série C										
Country	Japan		212	90	17	9	26	13	2	0	267	112
Country	Brazil		47	16							47	16
Country	Israel		8	1							8	1
Total			267	107	17	9	26	13	2	0	312	129
