= Yasuhiro Hato =

Japanese footballer

Yasuhiro Hato 波戸 康広
Personal information
- Full name: Yasuhiro Hato
- Date of birth: 4 May 1976 (age 50)
- Place of birth: Minamiawaji, Japan
- Height: 1.78 m (5 ft 10 in)
- Position: Defender

Youth career
- 1992–1994: Takigawa Daini High School

Senior career*
Years	Team	Apps	(Gls)
1995–1998	Yokohama Flügels	34	(0)
1999–2004	Yokohama F. Marinos	110	(1)
2004–2005	Kashiwa Reysol	50	(1)
2006–2009	Omiya Ardija	123	(0)
2010–2011	Yokohama F. Marinos	41	(0)
Total		358	(2)

International career
2001–2002	Japan	15	(0)
Medal record
Men's football
Representing Japan
FIFA Confederations Cup
Runner-up	2001 Korea/Japan
- * Club domestic league appearances and goals

Yasuhiro Hato (波戸 康広, Hato Yasuhiro; born 4 May 1976) is a former Japanese football player. He played for Japan national team.

== Club career ==
Hato was born in Minamiawaji on 4 May 1976. After graduating from high school, he joined Yokohama Flügels with teammate Takayuki Yoshida in 1995. He played as mainly right midfielder and his opportunities to play gradually increased from 1997. In 1998, the club won Emperor's Cup. However the club was disbanded end of 1998 season due to financial strain, he moved to Yokohama F. Marinos. He played as mainly right side-back and also center back. The club won the champions 2001 J.League Cup and 2003 J1 League. He moved to Kashiwa Reysol in April 2004. However the club was relegated to J2 League in 2005 and he moved to Omiya Ardija in 2006. He returned to Yokohama F. Marinos in 2010. He retired at the end of the 2011 season.

== National team career ==
On 25 April 2001, Hato debuted for Japan national team against Spain. After debut, he played as right midfielder in most matches including Confederations Cup in 2001. However his opportunity to play decreased behind Daisuke Ichikawa in 2002 and he was not elected Japan for 2002 World Cup. He played 15 games for Japan until 2002.

== Club statistics ==
Club performance			League		Cup		League Cup		Continental		Total	
Season	Club	League	Apps	Goals	Apps	Goals	Apps	Goals	Apps	Goals	Apps	Goals
Japan			League		Emperor's Cup		League Cup		Asia		Total	
1995	Yokohama Flügels	J1 League	9	0	1	0	-		-		10	0
1996	Yokohama Flügels	J1 League	0	0	0	0	0	0	-		0	0
1997	Yokohama Flügels	J1 League	9	0	1	0	4	0	-		14	0
1998	Yokohama Flügels	J1 League	16	0	5	0	3	0	-		24	0
1999	Yokohama F. Marinos	J1 League	19	1	0	0	4	0	-		23	1
2000	Yokohama F. Marinos	J1 League	26	0	3	0	6	0	-		35	0
2001	Yokohama F. Marinos	J1 League	27	0	1	0	9	1	-		37	1
2002	Yokohama F. Marinos	J1 League	27	0	2	0	0	0	-		29	0
2003	Yokohama F. Marinos	J1 League	10	0	3	0	3	0	-		16	0
2004	Yokohama F. Marinos	J1 League	1	0	0	0	1	0	1	0	3	0
2004	Kashiwa Reysol	J1 League	20	1	0	0	2	0	-		22	1
2005	Kashiwa Reysol	J1 League	30	0	2	0	6	0	-		38	0
2006	Omiya Ardija	J1 League	28	0	2	0	4	0	-		34	0
2007	Omiya Ardija	J1 League	31	0	1	0	4	0	-		36	0
2008	Omiya Ardija	J1 League	34	0	1	0	4	0	-		39	0
2009	Omiya Ardija	J1 League	30	0	1	0	5	0	-		36	0
2010	Yokohama F. Marinos	J1 League	25	0	3	0	0	0	-		28	0
2011	Yokohama F. Marinos	J1 League	16	0	1	0	3	0	-		20	0
Career total			358	2	27	0	58	1	1	0	444	3

== National team statistics ==
Japan national team
Year	Apps	Goals
2001	10	0
2002	5	0
Total	15	0

== Honors and awards ==
=== Team honors ===
- J1 League: 2003, 2004
- J.League Cup: 2001
- Emperor's Cup: 1998
- FIFA Confederations Cup Runner-up: 2001
