= Yasunari Hiraoka =

Japanese footballer

Yasunari Hiraoka 平岡 靖成
Personal information
- Full name: Yasunari Hiraoka
- Date of birth: March 13, 1972 (age 54)
- Place of birth: Yaita, Tochigi, Japan
- Height: 1.85 m (6 ft 1 in)
- Position: Defender

Youth career
- 1987–1989: Yaita Higashi High School
- 1990–1993: Juntendo University

Senior career*
Years	Team	Apps	(Gls)
1994–1996	Otsuka Pharmaceutical	48	(1)
1997–1998	Kyoto Purple Sanga	28	(0)
1999–2000	Oita Trinita	45	(1)
2000–2003	Nagoya Grampus Eight	41	(2)
2004–2007	Omiya Ardija	23	(0)
Total		185	(4)
- * Club domestic league appearances and goals

Yasunari Hiraoka (平岡 靖成, Hiraoka Yasunari; born March 13, 1972) is a former Japanese football player.

== Playing career ==
Hiraoka was born in Yaita on March 13, 1972. After graduating from Juntendo University, he joined Japan Football League club Otsuka Pharmaceutical in 1994. He played many matches as center back. In 1997, he moved to Kyoto Purple Sanga. Although he played many matches in 1997, he could hardly play in the match in 1998. In 1999, he moved to newly was promoted to J2 League club, Oita Trinita. He played many matches as regular player. In September 2000, he moved to Nagoya Grampus Eight. He played many matches as regular player until early 2001. However his opportunity to play decreased from late 2001 season. In 2004, he moved to J2 club Omiya Ardija. Although he could hardly play in the match in 2004, the club was promoted to J1. He played many matches in 2005. However he could hardly play in the match from 2006 and retired at the end of the 2007 season.

== Career statistics ==
Appearances and goals by club, season and competition
Club	Season	League			Emperor's Cup		J.League Cup		Total	
Club	Season	Division	Apps	Goals	Apps	Goals	Apps	Goals	Apps	Goals
Otsuka Pharmaceutical	1994	Football League	9	0	0	0	—		9	0
Otsuka Pharmaceutical	1995	Football League	15	0	1	0	—		16	0
Otsuka Pharmaceutical	1996	Football League	24	1	4	0	—		28	1
Kyoto Purple Sanga	1997	J1 League	26	0	1	0	1	0	28	0
Kyoto Purple Sanga	1998	J1 League	2	0	0	0	0	0	2	0
Oita Trinita	1999	J2 League	26	0	3	1	1	1	30	2
Oita Trinita	2000	J2 League	19	1	0	0	1	0	20	1
Nagoya Grampus Eight	2000	J1 League	12	1	2	1	5	1	19	3
Nagoya Grampus Eight	2001	J1 League	21	1	0	0	4	1	25	2
Nagoya Grampus Eight	2002	J1 League	8	0	0	0	2	0	10	0
Nagoya Grampus Eight	2003	J1 League	0	0	0	0	0	0	0	0
Omiya Ardija	2004	J2 League	4	0	2	0	—		6	0
Omiya Ardija	2005	J1 League	16	0	0	0	4	0	20	0
Omiya Ardija	2006	J1 League	3	0	0	0	1	0	4	0
Omiya Ardija	2007	J1 League	0	0	0	0	2	0	2	0
Career total			185	4	13	2	19	3	219	9
