= Masato Saito =

Japanese footballer

Masato Saito 斉藤 雅人
Personal information
- Full name: Masato Saito
- Date of birth: December 1, 1975 (age 50)
- Place of birth: Saitama, Saitama, Japan
- Height: 1.72 m (5 ft 8 in)
- Position: Midfielder

Youth career
- 1991–1993: Bunan High School
- 1994–1997: Komazawa University

Senior career*
Years	Team	Apps	(Gls)
1998–2009	Omiya Ardija	304	(14)
Total		304	(14)
- * Club domestic league appearances and goals

Masato Saito (斉藤 雅人, Saitō Masato; born December 1, 1975) is a former Japanese football player.

== Playing career ==
Saito was born in Saitama on December 1, 1975. After graduating from Komazawa University, he joined Japan Football League club Omiya Ardija based in his local in 1998. He played many matches as defensive midfielder from first season. The club was promoted to J2 League from 1999 and J1 League from 2005. Although he played many matches for a long time, he could not play many matches in 2009 and retired end of 2009 season.

== Post play career ==
Saito filled various coaching and directors roles at Omiya Ardija after retiring as a player. He finally retired as Academy director and Under-18 director in August 2024.

== Career statistics ==
Appearances and goals by club, season and competition
Club	Season	League			Emperor's Cup		J.League Cup		Total	
Club	Season	Division	Apps	Goals	Apps	Goals	Apps	Goals	Apps	Goals
Omiya Ardija	1998	Football League	15	1	3	0	-		18	1
Omiya Ardija	1999	J2 League	22	0	2	0	1	0	25	0
Omiya Ardija	2000	J2 League	24	2	3	0	2	0	29	2
Omiya Ardija	2001	J2 League	31	1	1	0	2	0	34	1
Omiya Ardija	2002	J2 League	35	3	3	0	-		38	3
Omiya Ardija	2003	J2 League	36	2	3	0	-		39	2
Omiya Ardija	2004	J2 League	43	2	3	0	-		46	2
Omiya Ardija	2005	J1 League	21	0	4	0	3	0	28	0
Omiya Ardija	2006	J1 League	25	0	1	0	3	0	29	0
Omiya Ardija	2007	J1 League	26	1	0	0	4	0	30	1
Omiya Ardija	2008	J1 League	22	2	0	0	3	0	25	2
Omiya Ardija	2009	J1 League	4	0	0	0	3	0	7	0
Career total			304	14	23	0	21	0	348	14
