= Tomoya Uchida =

Japanese footballer

Tomoya Uchida 内田 智也
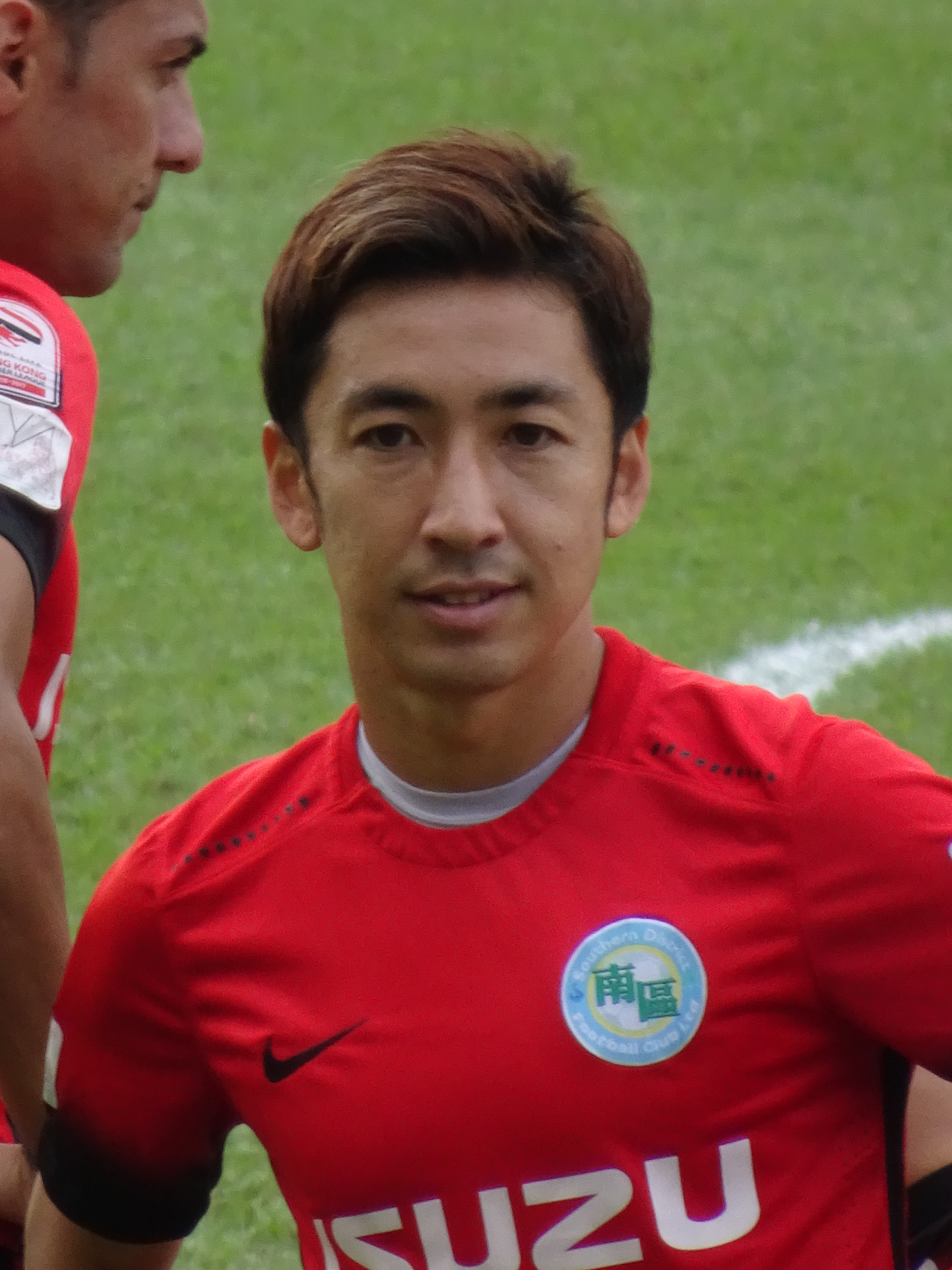

Personal information
- Full name: Tomoya Uchida
- Date of birth: July 10, 1983 (age 43)
- Place of birth: Komono, Mie, Japan
- Height: 1.66 m (5 ft 5 1/2 in)
- Position: Midfielder

Youth career
- 1999–2001: Yokkaichi Chuo Technical High School

Senior career*
Years	Team	Apps	(Gls)
2002–2007	Yokohama FC	185	(13)
2008–2010	Omiya Ardija	47	(3)
2011	Ventforet Kofu	9	(0)
2012–2016	Yokohama FC	68	(6)
2017	Southern District FC	11	(1)
Total		320	(23)
- * Club domestic league appearances and goals

Tomoya Uchida (内田 智也, Uchida Tomoya; born July 10, 1983) is a former Japanese football player.

== Playing career ==
Uchida was born in Komono, Mie on July 10, 1983. After graduating from high school, he joined J2 League club Yokohama FC in 2002. He got an opportunity to play from first season and became a regular player as offensive midfielder in summer 2003. Although the club results were sluggish every season, Yokohama won the champions in 2006 season and was promoted to J1 League first time in the club history. Although he played many matches, Yokohama finished at the bottom place in 2007 season and was relegated to J2 in a year. In 2008, he moved to Omiya Ardija. Although he could not become a regular player, he played many matches in 3 seasons. In 2011, he moved to Ventforet Kofu. However he could not play many matches. In 2012, he re-joined J2 club Yokohama FC for the first time in 4 years. Although he played many matches in 2013, his opportunity to play decreased from 2014. In 2017, he moved to Hong Kong and joined Southern District FC. He retired in September 2017.

== Club statistics ==
Club performance			League		Cup		League Cup		Total	
Season	Club	League	Apps	Goals	Apps	Goals	Apps	Goals	Apps	Goals
Japan			League		Emperor's Cup		J.League Cup		Total	
2002	Yokohama FC	J2 League	10	0	0	0	-		10	0
2003	Yokohama FC	J2 League	26	3	3	1	-		29	4
2004	Yokohama FC	J2 League	39	3	3	0	-		42	3
2005	Yokohama FC	J2 League	41	3	2	2	-		43	5
2006	Yokohama FC	J2 League	46	3	0	0	-		46	3
2007	Yokohama FC	J1 League	23	1	0	0	2	0	25	1
Total			185	13	8	3	2	1	195	17
2008	Omiya Ardija	J1 League	16	0	2	1	3	0	21	1
2009	Omiya Ardija	J1 League	22	3	1	0	2	0	25	3
2010	Omiya Ardija	J1 League	9	0	1	0	1	0	10	0
Total			47	3	4	1	6	0	57	4
2011	Ventforet Kofu	J1 League	9	0	1	0	1	0	11	0
Total			9	0	1	0	1	0	11	0
2012	Yokohama FC	J2 League	9	1	1	0	–		10	1
2013	Yokohama FC	J2 League	26	4	1	0	–		27	4
2014	Yokohama FC	J2 League	17	0	1	0	–		18	0
2015	Yokohama FC	J2 League	11	0	2	0	–		13	0
2016	Yokohama FC	J2 League	5	1	3	0	–		8	1
Total			68	6	8	0	–		76	6
Hong Kong			League		Domestic Cups		International Cups		Total	
2016/17	Southern District FC	Premier League	11	1	2	0	–		13	1
Total			11	1	2	0	–		13	1
Career total			320	23	23	4	9	1	352	28
