= Kota Yoshihara =

Japanese footballer

Kota Yoshihara 吉原 宏太
Personal information
- Full name: Kota Yoshihara
- Date of birth: February 2, 1978 (age 48)
- Place of birth: Fujiidera, Osaka, Japan
- Height: 1.70 m (5 ft 7 in)
- Position: Forward

Youth career
- 1993–1995: Hatsushiba Hashimoto High School

Senior career*
Years	Team	Apps	(Gls)
1996–1999	Consadole Sapporo	105	(40)
2000–2005	Gamba Osaka	134	(38)
2006–2008	Omiya Ardija	60	(9)
2009–2012	Mito HollyHock	98	(18)
Total		397	(105)

International career
1999	Japan	1	(0)
Medal record
Gamba Osaka
Winner	J1 League	2005
Runner-up	J.League Cup	2005
- * Club domestic league appearances and goals

Kota Yoshihara (吉原 宏太, Yoshihara Kōta; born February 2, 1978) is a former Japanese football player. He played for Japan national team.

== Club career ==
Yoshihara was born in Fujiidera on February 2, 1978. After graduating from high school, he joined Japan Football League club Consadole Sapporo in 1996. The club won the champions in 1997 and was promoted to J1 League. However the club was relegated to new league J2 League in 1999. He moved to his local club Gamba Osaka in 2000. Although he became a regular player from 2001, his opportunity to play decreased from 2003. He moved to Omiya Ardija in 2006. He moved to Mito HollyHock in 2009. He made an announcement to retire on 2 February 2013, on his 35th birthday.

== National team career ==
In June 1999, Yoshihara was selected Japan national team for 1999 Copa América. At this competition, on July 2, he debuted against Paraguay.

== Club statistics ==
Club	Season	League		Emperor's Cup		J.League Cup		Total	
Club	Season	Apps	Goals	Apps	Goals	Apps	Goals	Apps	Goals
Consadole Sapporo	1996	24	6	3	1	–		27	7
Consadole Sapporo	1997	15	8	3	2	2	0	20	10
Consadole Sapporo	1998	34	11	3	1	4	1	41	13
Consadole Sapporo	1999	32	15	2	0	2	0	36	15
Gamba Osaka	2000	19	3	3	1	2	0	24	4
Gamba Osaka	2001	27	11	3	2	2	0	32	13
Gamba Osaka	2002	27	11	2	1	6	3	35	15
Gamba Osaka	2003	20	6	2	2	4	1	26	9
Gamba Osaka	2004	22	5	4	0	5	0	31	5
Gamba Osaka	2005	19	2	1	0	9	3	29	5
Omiya Ardija	2006	15	2	1	0	1	0	17	2
Omiya Ardija	2007	26	5	1	0	5	1	32	6
Omiya Ardija	2008	19	2	1	0	2	0	22	2
Mito HollyHock	2009	47	9	1	0	–		48	9
Mito HollyHock	2010	24	6	0	0	–		24	6
Mito HollyHock	2011	9	2	2	0	–		11	2
Mito HollyHock	2012	18	1	1	0	–		19	1
Total		397	105	33	10	44	9	474	124

== National team statistics ==
Japan national team
Year	Apps	Goals
1999	1	0
Total	1	0
