= Claudio Úbeda =

Argentine footballer

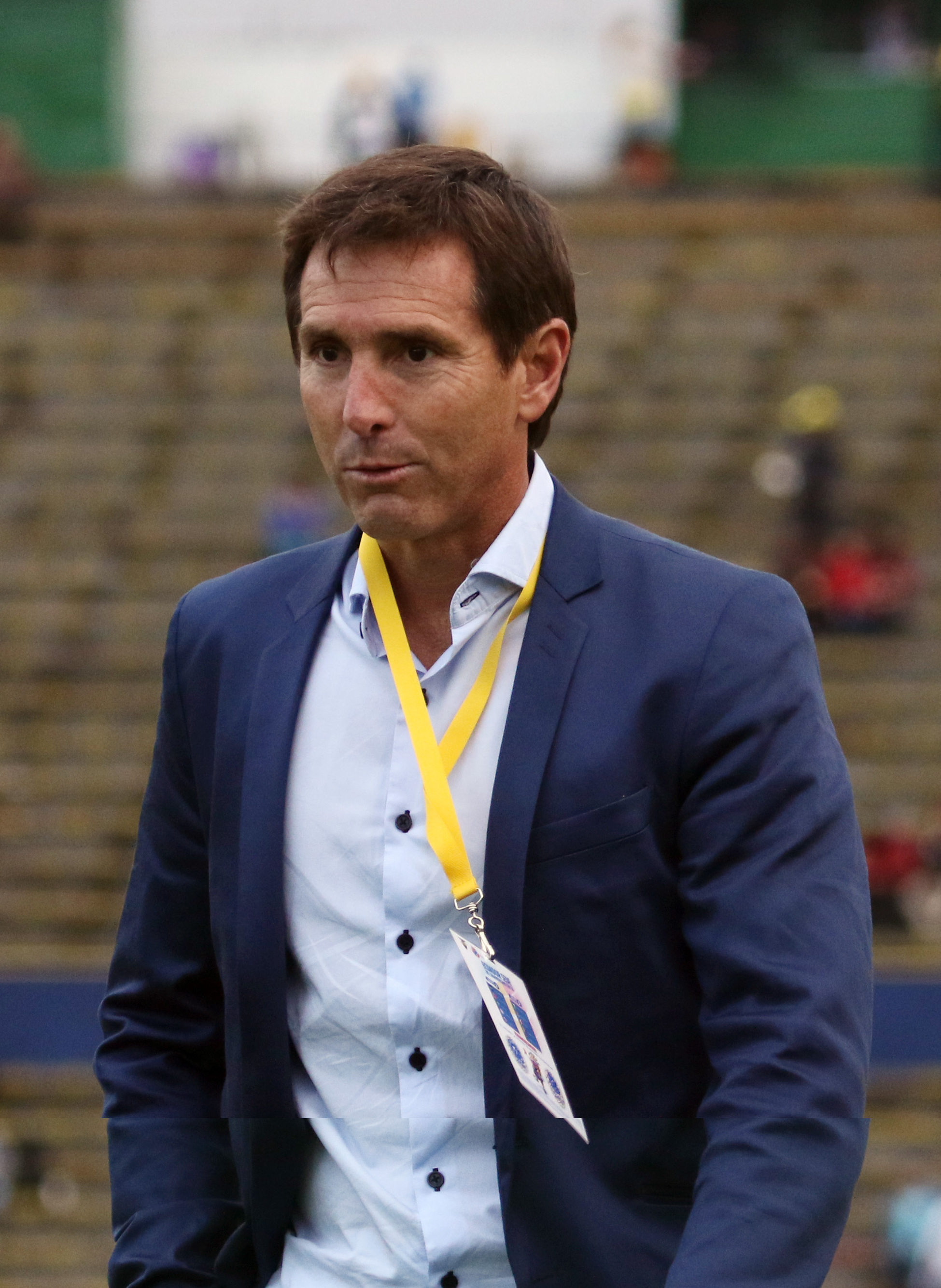
- Úbeda in 2017

Personal information
- Full name: Claudio Fernando Úbeda
- Date of birth: 17 September 1969 (age 57)
- Place of birth: Rosario, Argentina
- Height: 1.80 m (5 ft 11 in)
- Positions: Centre-back; left-back

Youth career
- Central Córdoba de Rosario
- 1988–1989: Racing Club
- 1989–1990: Rosario Central

Senior career*
| Years | Team | Apps | (Gls) |
| 1987–1988 | Central Córdoba de Rosario | 36 | (0) |
| 1990–1994 | Rosario Central | 116 | (6) |
| 1994–1995 | Tampico Madero | 33 | (3) |
| 1995–2006 | Racing Club | 289 | (8) |
| 2004 | → Tokyo Verdy (loan) | 25 | (3) |
| 2006–2007 | Huracán | 57 | (1) |

International career
| 1989 | Argentina U20 | 1 | (0) |

Managerial career
- 2008: Huracán
- 2010: Independiente Rivadavia
- 2012: Racing Club (assistant)
- 2012–2013: Boca Unidos
- 2014–2015: Magallanes
- 2016: Racing Club (reserves)
- 2016: Racing Club (interim)
- 2016–2017: Argentina U20
- 2017–2021: Racing Club (youth)
- 2021: Racing Club (interim)
- 2021–2025: Al-Nassr (assistant)
- 2025: Boca Juniors (assistant)
- 2025: Boca Juniors (interim)
- 2026: Boca Juniors
- * Club domestic league appearances and goals

Claudio Fernando Úbeda (born 17 September 1969) is an Argentine football manager and former player who played as a either a centre-back or a left-back.

After having a playing career mainly associated with Rosario Central and Racing Club, Úbeda switched to managerial duties in 2008, with Huracán.

== Club career ==
Born in Rosario, Úbeda made his senior debut with hometown side Central Córdoba in the 1987–88 season, helping the club to achieve promotion to the Primera B Metropolitana. He then moved to Racing Club in 1988, playing for their youth sides, before making his Primera División debut with Rosario Central in 1990.

After establishing himself in the first team of Central in 1991, Úbeda moved to Mexican side Tampico Madero in 1994. He returned to his home country in the following year, returning to Racing and becoming an undisputed starter.

In January 2004, Úbeda agreed to join J1 League side Tokyo Verdy 1969 on loan. Back to Racing in 2005, he moved to Huracán in the following year, and retired with the latter in December 2007, aged 38.

== International career ==
Úbeda was a participant at the 1989 FIFA World Youth Championship in Saudi Arabia.

== Managerial career ==
Úbeda was presented as manager of his last club Huracán on 21 December 2007, and led the side on 24 matches before resigning on 14 September 2008. On 11 December 2009, after more than a year without a club, he agreed to become the manager of Independiente Rivadavia.

Sacked in March 2010 after five losses in seven matches, Úbeda returned to Racing in December 2011, as an assistant of Alfio Basile. He left with Basile in April 2012, and was named Boca Unidos manager on 3 December of that year.

After a poor run of form in November 2013 (which included a 6–0 loss to Crucero del Norte), Úbeda resigned, and was announced as manager of Chilean club Magallanes on 27 May 2014. On 21 April 2015, he presented his resignation from the club, and returned to Racing on 29 December, as a manager of the reserve team.

On 17 August 2016, Úbeda was named interim manager of Racing, after Facundo Sava left. He remained undefeated in his two matches in charge, and returned to his former role after the appointment of Ricardo Zielinski.

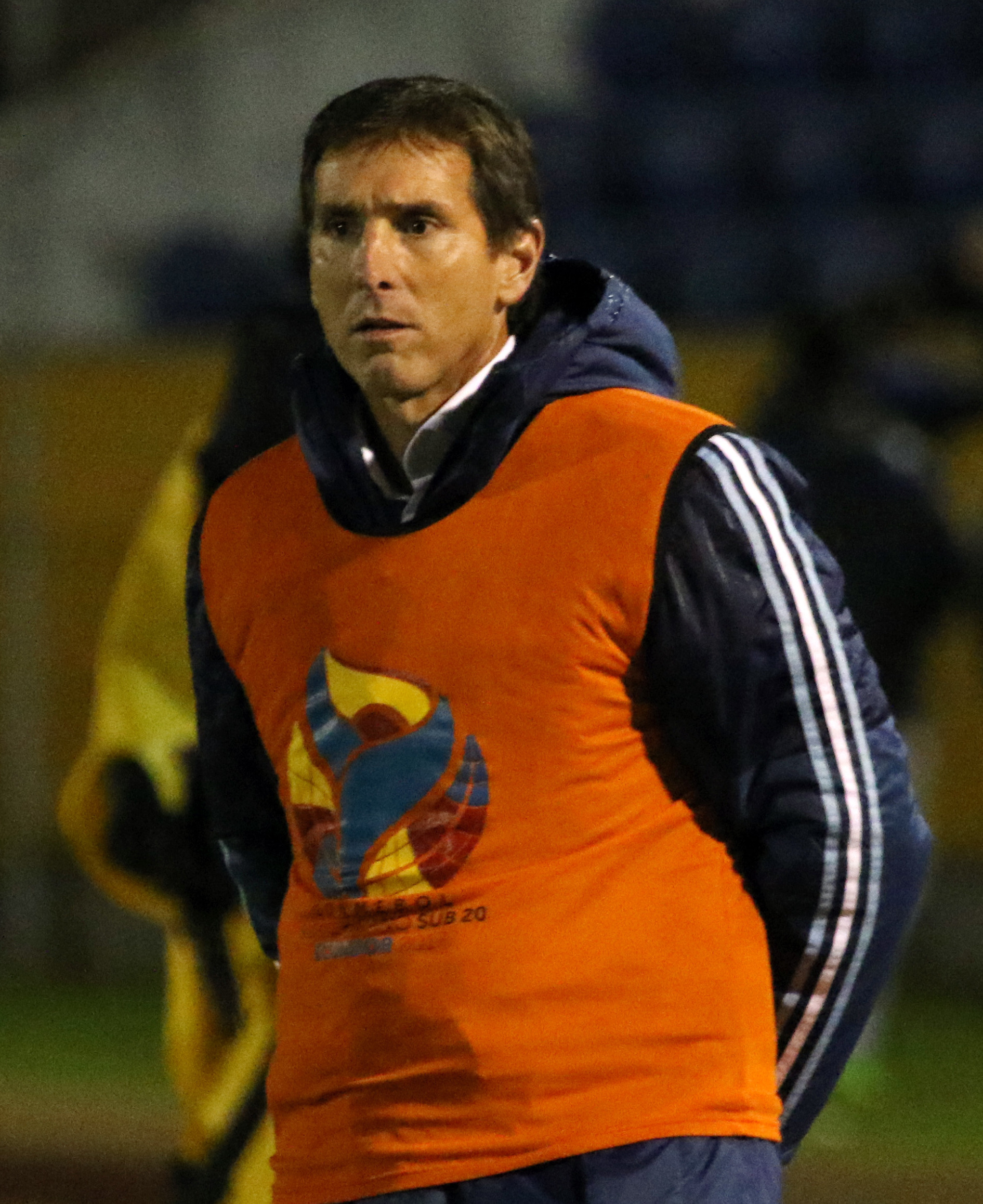
Úbeda as manager of the Argentina national under-20 team in January 2017

On 15 October 2016, Úbeda was appointed manager of the Argentina national under-20 team. Dismissed after the 2017 FIFA U-20 World Cup, where his side was knocked out in the group stage, he subsequently returned to Racing as a youth coordinator.

On 11 August 2021, after Juan Antonio Pizzi was sacked, Úbeda named interim manager of Racing's first team until the end of the year. In October, he returned to his previous role after the arrival of Fernando Gago, and moved to Al-Nassr in December, as an assistant of Miguel Ángel Russo.

Úbeda continued to work as Russo's assistant in the following years, at Rosario Central, San Lorenzo and Boca Juniors. On 9 October 2025, after Russo was deceased, Úbeda was appointed manager of Boca for the remainder of the year.

On 29 December 2025, after qualifying the club to the 2026 Copa Libertadores, Úbeda was confirmed as manager of Boca Juniors for the ensuing campaign. The following 28 May, after the club's elimination from the continental competition, he left.

== Club statistics ==
| Club performance | | | League | |
| Season | Club | League | Apps | Goals |
| Argentina | | | League | |
|---|---|---|---|---|
| 1990/91 | Rosario Central | Primera División | 19 | 0 |
| 1991/92 | Rosario Central | Primera División | 0 | 0 |
| 1992/93 | Rosario Central | Primera División | 36 | 0 |
| 1993/94 | Rosario Central | Primera División | 22 | 1 |
| Mexico | | | League | |
| 1994/95 | Tampico Madero | Liga Ascenso | | |
| Argentina | | | League | |
| 1995/96 | Racing | Primera División | 22 | 0 |
| 1996/97 | Racing | Primera División | 32 | 1 |
| 1997/98 | Racing | Primera División | 26 | 1 |
| 1998/99 | Racing | Primera División | 35 | 4 |
| 1999/00 | Racing | Primera División | 35 | 1 |
| 2000/01 | Racing | Primera División | 37 | 0 |
| 2001/02 | Racing | Primera División | 36 | 0 |
| 2002/03 | Racing | Primera División | 35 | 1 |
| 2003/04 | Racing | Primera División | 17 | 1 |
| Japan | | | League | |
| 2004 | Tokyo Verdy | J1 League | 25 | 3 |
| Argentina | | | League | |
| 2004/05 | Racing | Primera División | 4 | 0 |
| 2005/06 | Racing | Primera División | 11 | 1 |
| Country | Argentina | | 367 | 11 |
| Country | Mexico | | | |
| Country | Japan | | 25 | 3 |
| Total | | | 392 | 14 |

== Managerial statistics ==
As of 28 May 2026

Managerial record by team and tenure
| Team | Nat | From | To | Record | | | | | | | |
| Team | Nat | From | To | G | W | D | L | GF | GA | GD | Win % |
|---|---|---|---|---|---|---|---|---|---|---|---|
| Huracán | (Argentina) | 1 January 2008 | 15 September 2008 | 24 | 6 | 7 | 11 | 19 | 27 | −8 | 25.00 |
| Independiente Rivadavia | (Argentina) | 1 January 2010 | 12 March 2010 | 7 | 1 | 1 | 5 | 9 | 15 | −6 | 14.29 |
| Racing Club (interim) | (Argentina) | 1 January 2012 | 15 April 2012 | 1 | 1 | 0 | 0 | 3 | 1 | +2 | 100.00 |
| Boca Unidos | (Argentina) | 3 December 2012 | 23 November 2013 | 43 | 13 | 16 | 14 | 42 | 44 | −2 | 30.23 |
| Magallanes | (Chile) | 17 August 2014 | 21 April 2015 | 43 | 14 | 11 | 18 | 51 | 57 | −6 | 32.56 |
| Racing Club (interim) | (Argentina) | 18 August 2016 | 29 August 2016 | 2 | 1 | 0 | 1 | 3 | 2 | +1 | 50.00 |
| Argentina U20 | (Argentina) | 17 October 2016 | 30 June 2017 | 18 | 10 | 4 | 4 | 37 | 23 | +14 | 55.56 |
| Racing Club (interim) | (Argentina) | 11 August 2021 | 19 October 2021 | 13 | 3 | 7 | 3 | 14 | 12 | +2 | 23.08 |
| Boca Juniors | (Argentina) | 9 October 2025 | 28 May 2026 | 32 | 17 | 7 | 8 | 45 | 22 | +23 | 53.13 |
| Total | | | | 183 | 66 | 54 | 63 | 223 | 203 | +20 | 36.07 |

== Honours ==
=== Player ===
Central Córdoba de Rosario

- Primera C (1): 1987-88

Racing Club

- Argentine Primera División (1): Apertura 2001

Tokyo Verdy

- Emperor's Cup (1): 2004

=== Manager ===
Boca Juniors

- Argentine Primera División: 2026 Liga
