= Hiroshi Morita =

Japanese footballer

Hiroshi Morita 森田 浩史
Personal information
- Date of birth: May 18, 1978 (age 48)
- Place of birth: Kumamoto, Japan
- Height: 1.88 m (6 ft 2 in)
- Position: Forward

Youth career
- 1994–1996: Kumamoto Gakuen University High School
- 1997–2000: University of Teacher Education Fukuoka

Senior career*
Years	Team	Apps	(Gls)
2001–2002	Sagan Tosu	55	(19)
2003–2004	Albirex Niigata	15	(5)
2004–2008	Omiya Ardija	117	(22)
2009	Ventforet Kofu	41	(7)
2010	Thai Port	6	(1)
2010	V-Varen Nagasaki	13	(4)
Total		247	(58)
- * Club domestic league appearances and goals

Hiroshi Morita (森田 浩史, Morita Hiroshi; born May 18, 1978) is a former Japanese football player.

== Playing career ==
Morita was born in Kumamoto Prefecture on May 18, 1978. After graduating from University of Teacher Education Fukuoka, he joined J2 League club Sagan Tosu in 2001. He played many matches as forward from first season and became a regular player in 2002 season. In 2003, he moved to J2 club Albirex Niigata. Although Albirex won the champions in 2003 season and was promoted to J1 League from 2004 season, he could not play many matches. In July 2004, he moved to J2 club Omiya Ardija. After the transfer, he played all 21 matches except 1 match for suspension and scored 10 goals in 2004 season. Ardija also won the 2nd place in 2004 season and was promoted to J1. Although the club results were sluggish in J1, he played many matches every season. In 2009, he moved to J2 club Ventforet Kofu and played many matches. In 2010, he moved to Thai club Thai Port. In July 2010, he returned to Japan and joined Japan Football League club V-Varen Nagasaki. He retired end of 2010 season.

== Career statistics ==
Appearances and goals by club, season and competition
Club	Season	League			Emperor's Cup		J.League Cup		Total	
Club	Season	Division	Apps	Goals	Apps	Goals	Apps	Goals	Apps	Goals
Sagan Tosu	2001	J2 League	17	5	4	2	1	0	22	6
Sagan Tosu	2002	J2 League	38	14	3	1	—		41	15
Albirex Niigata	2003	J2 League	12	4	4	5	—		16	9
Albirex Niigata	2004	J1 League	3	1	0	0	1	1	4	2
Omiya Ardija	2004	J2 League	21	10	3	0	—		24	10
Omiya Ardija	2005	J1 League	29	5	3	1	7	0	39	6
Omiya Ardija	2006	J1 League	30	3	1	0	6	3	37	6
Omiya Ardija	2007	J1 League	21	2	1	0	3	0	25	2
Omiya Ardija	2008	J1 League	16	2	0	0	5	1	21	3
Ventforet Kofu	2009	J2 League	41	7	3	0	—		44	7
V-Varen Nagasaki	2010	Football League	13	4	1	0	—		14	4
Career total			241	57	23	9	23	5	287	71
