= 2004 Tokyo Verdy 1969 season =

Tokyo Verdy 1969
2004 season
- Manager: Osvaldo Ardiles
- Stadium: Ajinomoto Stadium
- J. League 1: 9th
- Emperor's Cup: Champions
- J. League Cup: Semifinals
- Top goalscorer: Kazuki Hiramoto (6); Naoto Sakurai (6)
Home colours	Away colours

During the 2004 season, Tokyo Verdy 1969 competed in the J. League 1, in which they finished 9th.

== Competitions ==
Competitions	Position
J. League 1	9th / 16 clubs
Emperor's Cup	Champions
J. League Cup	Semifinals

== Domestic results ==
=== J. League 1 ===
Match	Date	Venue	Opponents	Score
1-1	2004.3.13	Yamaha Stadium	Júbilo Iwata	2-0
1-2	2004.3.21	Ajinomoto Stadium	Kashiwa Reysol	0-1
1-3	2004.4.3	Ajinomoto Stadium	FC Tokyo	3-2
1-4	2004.4.10	Ajinomoto Stadium	Gamba Osaka	2-2
1-5	2004.4.14	Kobe Wing Stadium	Vissel Kobe	1-1
1-6	2004.4.17	Ajinomoto Stadium	Sanfrecce Hiroshima	0-0
1-7	2004.5.2	Niigata Stadium	Albirex Niigata	0-1
1-8	2004.5.5	Ajinomoto Stadium	JEF United Ichihara	2-1
1-9	2004.5.9	International Stadium Yokohama	Yokohama F. Marinos	3-1
1-10	2004.5.15	Toyota Stadium	Nagoya Grampus Eight	1-2
1-11	2004.5.22	Ajinomoto Stadium	Urawa Red Diamonds	1-3
1-12	2004.6.13	Nagai Stadium	Cerezo Osaka	2-2
1-13	2004.6.16	National Stadium	Kashima Antlers	3-0
1-14	2004.6.19	Nihondaira Sports Stadium	Shimizu S-Pulse	3-1
1-15	2004.6.26	Ajinomoto Stadium	Oita Trinita	3-1
2-1	2004.8.14	Ajinomoto Stadium	Albirex Niigata	2-0
2-2	2004.8.21	Saitama Stadium 2002	Urawa Red Diamonds	7-2
2-3	2004.8.29	National Stadium	FC Tokyo	0-1
2-4	2004.9.11	Ichihara Seaside Stadium	JEF United Ichihara	2-1
2-5	2004.9.18	Ajinomoto Stadium	Nagoya Grampus Eight	3-1
2-6	2004.9.23	Osaka Expo '70 Stadium	Gamba Osaka	1-3
2-7	2004.9.26	Hiroshima Big Arch	Sanfrecce Hiroshima	3-0
2-8	2004.10.2	Ajinomoto Stadium	Vissel Kobe	0-2
2-9	2004.10.17	Kumamoto Stadium	Oita Trinita	2-3
2-10	2004.10.23	National Stadium	Shimizu S-Pulse	4-0
2-11	2004.10.30	Ajinomoto Stadium	Júbilo Iwata	1-2
2-12	2004.11.6	Hitachi Kashiwa Soccer Stadium	Kashiwa Reysol	0-2
2-13	2004.11.20	Ajinomoto Stadium	Cerezo Osaka	1-1
2-14	2004.11.23	Kashima Soccer Stadium	Kashima Antlers	1-0
2-15	2004.11.28	Ajinomoto Stadium	Yokohama F. Marinos	0-0

=== Emperor's Cup ===
Match	Date	Venue	Opponents	Score
4th Round	2004.11.13	Nishikyogoku Athletic Stadium	Kyoto Purple Sanga	1-2
5th Round	2004.12.12	Toyota Stadium	Nagoya Grampus Eight	2-1
Quarterfinals	2004.12.19	Nagasaki Stadium	Thespa Kusatsu	0-3
Semifinals	2004.12.25	Nagai Stadium	Gamba Osaka	3-1
Final	2005.1.1	National Stadium	Júbilo Iwata	2-1

=== J. League Cup ===
Match	Date	Venue	Opponents	Score
GL-A-1	2004.3.27	Nagai Stadium	Cerezo Osaka	1-1
GL-A-2	2004.4.29	Ajinomoto Stadium	Cerezo Osaka	4-1
GL-A-3	2004.5.29	National Stadium	Sanfrecce Hiroshima	3-0
GL-A-4	2004.6.5	Yokohama Mitsuzawa Football Stadium	Yokohama F. Marinos	1-2
GL-A-5	2004.7.17	Ajinomoto Stadium	Yokohama F. Marinos	3-0
GL-A-6	2004.7.24	Coca-Cola West Hiroshima Stadium	Sanfrecce Hiroshima	1-3
Quarterfinals	2004.9.4	Ajinomoto Stadium	Shimizu S-Pulse	2-1
Semifinals	2004.10.13	Ajinomoto Stadium	FC Tokyo	4-3

== Player statistics ==
No.	Pos.	Player	D.o.B. (Age)	Height / Weight	J. League 1		Emperor's Cup		J. League Cup		Total	
No.	Pos.	Player	D.o.B. (Age)	Height / Weight	Apps	Goals	Apps	Goals	Apps	Goals	Apps	Goals
1	GK	Hiroki Mizuhara	January 15, 1975 (aged 29)	cm / kg	0	0						
2	DF	Takuya Yamada	August 24, 1974 (aged 29)	cm / kg	27	1						
3	DF	Claudio Ubeda	September 17, 1969 (aged 34)	cm / kg	25	3						
4	MF	Kentaro Hayashi	August 29, 1972 (aged 31)	cm / kg	29	1						
5	DF	Atsushi Yoneyama	November 20, 1976 (aged 27)	cm / kg	29	3						
6	MF	Atsuhiro Miura	July 24, 1974 (aged 29)	cm / kg	23	4						
7	MF	Nozomi Hiroyama	May 6, 1977 (aged 26)	cm / kg	4	0						
8	MF	Daigo Kobayashi	February 19, 1983 (aged 21)	cm / kg	27	0						
9	FW	Patrick M'Boma	November 15, 1970 (aged 33)	cm / kg	12	4						
10	MF	Hugo	October 27, 1982 (aged 21)	cm / kg	14	1						
11	FW	Kazuki Hiramoto	August 18, 1981 (aged 22)	cm / kg	25	6						
12	GK	Satoshi Tokizawa	July 31, 1985 (aged 18)	cm / kg	0	0						
13	DF	Masayuki Yanagisawa	August 27, 1979 (aged 24)	cm / kg	14	0						
14	DF	Seitaro Tomisawa	July 8, 1982 (aged 21)	cm / kg	1	0						
15	MF	Takahito Soma	December 10, 1981 (aged 22)	cm / kg	11	2						
16	FW	Naoto Sakurai	September 2, 1975 (aged 28)	cm / kg	21	6						
17	DF	Kenta Togawa	June 23, 1981 (aged 22)	cm / kg	15	0						
18	MF	Shingo Nejime	December 22, 1984 (aged 19)	cm / kg	1	0						
19	MF	Yuhei Ono	July 1, 1985 (aged 18)	cm / kg	1	0						
20	FW	Kazunori Iio	February 23, 1982 (aged 22)	cm / kg	12	0						
21	GK	Yoshinari Takagi	May 20, 1979 (aged 24)	cm / kg	30	0						
22	MF	Takashi Hirano	July 15, 1974 (aged 29)	cm / kg	28	4						
25	FW	Takayuki Morimoto	May 7, 1988 (aged 15)	cm / kg	22	4						
27	MF	Masatomo Kuba	November 21, 1984 (aged 19)	cm / kg	0	0						
30	DF	Yugo Ichiyanagi	April 2, 1985 (aged 18)	cm / kg	0	0						
31	DF	Lee Gang-Jin	April 25, 1986 (aged 17)	cm / kg	7	0						
32	MF	Yoshiyuki Kobayashi	January 27, 1978 (aged 26)	cm / kg	29	4						
33	MF	Jun Tamano	June 19, 1984 (aged 19)	cm / kg	2	0						
34	FW	Lopez	July 7, 1984 (aged 19)	cm / kg	0	0						

== Other pages ==
- (in Japanese) J. League official site
