= Takuro Nishimura =

Japanese footballer

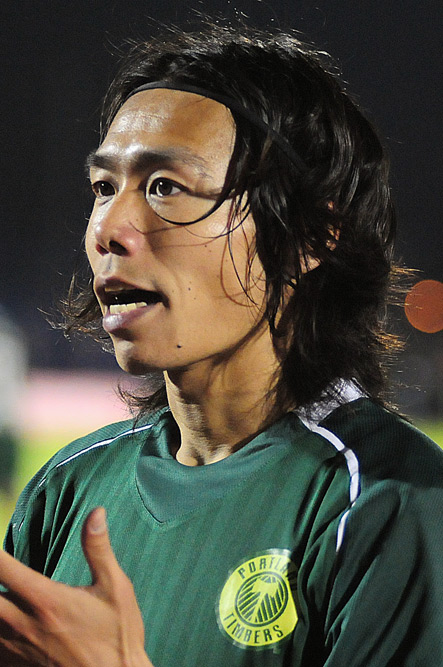

Personal information
- Full name: Takuro Nishimura
- Date of birth: August 15, 1977 (age 49)
- Place of birth: Shinjuku, Tokyo, Japan
- Height: 1.76 m (5 ft 9 1/2 in)
- Position: Defender

Youth career
- 1993–1995: Mitsubishi Yowa
- 1997–2000: Kokushikan University

Senior career*
Years	Team	Apps	(Gls)
2001–2004	Urawa Reds	0	(0)
2004–2008	Omiya Ardija	82	(1)
2009	Portland Timbers	13	(0)
2010	Crystal Palace Baltimore	19	(0)
2011	Consadole Sapporo	1	(0)
Total		115	(1)
Medal record
Urawa Reds
Runner-up	J1 League	2004
Winner	J.League Cup	2003
Runner-up	J.League Cup	2002
Runner-up	J.League Cup	2004
- * Club domestic league appearances and goals

Takuro Nishimura (西村 卓朗, Nishimura Takuro; born August 15, 1977) is a former Japanese football player.

== Career ==
=== College ===
Nishimura attended Kokushikan University in Setagaya, Tokyo from 1997 to 2000, winning the All-Japan Prime Minister Cup.

=== Professional ===
Nishimura began his professional career with J1 League sides Urawa Reds, but never made a league appearance for the team which finished the 2004 season in second place in J1 League. He transferred to Urawa's cross-town rivals Omiya Ardija, helping the club achieve promotion from J2 League into J1 League in 2004. He became a regular player as right side back and the club won the 2nd place and was promoted to J2 from 2005. Although his opportunity to play decreased in 2006, he became a regular player again in 2007. However he could hardly play in the match in 2008.

Nishimura signed for Portland Timbers of the USL First Division in April 2009. On February 11, 2010 Crystal Palace Baltimore announced the signing of Nishimura to a contract for the 2010 season.

In 2011, he returned to Japan and joined J2 club Consadole Sapporo. However he could hardly play in the match and retired end of 2011 season.

=== National team ===
Nishimura was a part of Japan’s youth national team system, competing at the U-14 level, but has never been called up to the senior Japan national team.

== Club statistics ==
Club performance			League		Cup		League Cup		Total	
Season	Club	League	Apps	Goals	Apps	Goals	Apps	Goals	Apps	Goals
Japan			League		Emperor's Cup		J.League Cup		Total	
1998	Kokushikan University	Football League			2	0	-		2	0
1999	Kokushikan University	Football League	5	0	2	0	-		7	0
2000	Kokushikan University	Football League	3	0	0	0	-		3	0
2001	Urawa Reds	J1 League	0	0	0	0	0	0	0	0
2002	Urawa Reds	J1 League	0	0	0	0	0	0	0	0
2003	Urawa Reds	J1 League	0	0	0	0	0	0	0	0
2004	Urawa Reds	J1 League	0	0	0	0	0	0	0	0
2004	Omiya Ardija	J2 League	15	0	3	0	-		18	0
2005	Omiya Ardija	J1 League	31	1	4	0	8	1	43	2
2006	Omiya Ardija	J1 League	12	0	1	0	4	0	17	0
2007	Omiya Ardija	J1 League	24	0	0	0	5	0	29	0
2008	Omiya Ardija	J1 League	0	0	0	0	1	0	1	0
United States			League		Open Cup		League Cup		Total	
2009	Portland Timbers	USL First Division	13	0	0	0	-		13	0
2010	Crystal Palace Baltimore	D2 Pro League	19	0	1	0	-		20	0
Japan			League		Emperor's Cup		J.League Cup		Total	
2011	Consadole Sapporo	J2 League	1	0	1	0	-		2	0
Country	Japan		91	1	13	0	18	1	122	2
Country	United States		32	0	1	0	-		33	0
Total			123	1	14	0	18	1	155	2

== Playing style ==
Small in size but wide flank utility player on and off the ball, Nishimura's creates a wider variety of attacking options for the team. His crosses also provide scoring opportunities.

== Honors ==
=== Portland Timbers ===
- USL First Division Commissioner's Cup (1): 2009
