= Daisuke Tomita =

Japanese footballer (born 1977)

Daisuke Tomita 冨田 大介
Personal information
- Full name: Daisuke Tomita
- Date of birth: April 24, 1977 (age 49)
- Place of birth: Ube, Yamaguchi, Japan
- Height: 1.80 m (5 ft 11 in)
- Position: Defender

Youth career
- 1993–1995: Ube High School
- 1996–1999: University of Tsukuba

Senior career*
Years	Team	Apps	(Gls)
2000–2003	Mito HollyHock	146	(9)
2004–2009	Omiya Ardija	190	(10)
2010	Vissel Kobe	6	(0)
2011–2012	Ventforet Kofu	25	(0)
2013–2014	Mito HollyHock	60	(2)
2015–2017	Tokushima Vortis	37	(4)
2018	Mito HollyHock	0	(0)
Total		464	(25)
- * Club domestic league appearances and goals

Daisuke Tomita (冨田 大介, Tomita Daisuke; born April 24, 1977) is a former Japanese football player.

== Playing career ==
Tomita was born in Ube on April 24, 1977. After graduating from University of Tsukuba, he joined newly was promoted to J2 League club, Mito HollyHock in 2000. He became a regular player as defensive midfielder from first season. He was converted to center back in 2001. In 2004, he moved to J2 club Omiya Ardija. He played as regular center back. Ardija won the 2nd place and was promoted to J1 League first time in the club history. He played more 30 matches every season until 2008. In 2010, he moved to Vissel Kobe. However he could hardly play in the match. In 2011, he moved to Ventforet Kofu. However the club was relegated to J2 end of 2011 season and he could not play many matches in 2012. In 2013, he re-joined Mito HollyHock for the first time in 10 years. He played as regular center back in 2013. However his opportunity to play decreased in 2014. In 2015, he moved to Tokushima Vortis. Although he could not play at all in the match until 2016, he could hardly play in the match in 2017. In 2018, he re-joined Mito HollyHock. However he could hardly play in the match and retired by the end of the 2018 season.

== Club statistics ==
Club performance			League		Cup		League Cup		Total	
Season	Club	League	Apps	Goals	Apps	Goals	Apps	Goals	Apps	Goals
Japan			League		Emperor's Cup		J.League Cup		Total	
2000	Mito HollyHock	J2 League	33	1	3	0	2	0	38	1
2001	Mito HollyHock	J2 League	36	2	2	1	2	0	40	3
2002	Mito HollyHock	J2 League	36	2	3	0	-		39	2
2003	Mito HollyHock	J2 League	41	4	3	1	-		44	5
Total			146	9	11	2	4	0	161	11
2004	Omiya Ardija	J2 League	43	4	2	1	-		45	5
2005	Omiya Ardija	J1 League	32	0	3	1	5	2	40	3
2006	Omiya Ardija	J1 League	31	2	1	0	5	0	37	2
2007	Omiya Ardija	J1 League	31	1	0	0	6	0	37	1
2008	Omiya Ardija	J1 League	32	2	1	0	5	0	38	2
2009	Omiya Ardija	J1 League	21	1	2	0	4	0	27	1
Total			190	10	9	2	25	2	224	14
2010	Vissel Kobe	J1 League	6	0	1	0	2	0	9	0
Total			6	0	1	0	2	0	9	0
2011	Ventforet Kofu	J1 League	18	0	1	0	0	0	19	0
2012	Ventforet Kofu	J2 League	7	0	1	0	-		8	0
Total			25	0	2	0	0	0	27	0
2013	Mito HollyHock	J2 League	40	2	1	0	-		41	2
2014	Mito HollyHock	J2 League	20	0	1	0	-		21	0
Total			60	2	2	0	-		62	2
2015	Tokushima Vortis	J2 League	16	2	4	0	-		20	2
2016	Tokushima Vortis	J2 League	21	2	3	0	-		24	2
2017	Tokushima Vortis	J2 League	0	0	1	0	-		1	0
Total			37	4	8	0	-		45	4
2018	Mito HollyHock	J2 League	0	0	2	1	-		2	1
Total			0	0	2	1	-		2	1
Career total			464	25	35	5	31	2	530	32
