= Naoto Sakurai =

Japanese footballer (born 1975)

Naoto Sakurai 桜井 直人
Personal information
- Full name: Naoto Sakurai
- Date of birth: September 2, 1975 (age 51)
- Place of birth: Saitama, Japan
- Height: 1.70 m (5 ft 7 in)
- Position: Forward

Youth career
- 1991–1993: Omiya Higashi High School

Senior career*
| Years | Team | Apps | (Gls) |
| 1994–1999 | Urawa Reds | 20 | (0) |
| 1999–2004 | Tokyo Verdy | 116 | (23) |
| 2005–2008 | Omiya Ardija | 50 | (9) |
| Total | | 186 | (32) |
Medal record
Tokyo Verdy
| Winner | Emperor's Cup | 2004 |
- * Club domestic league appearances and goals

Naoto Sakurai (桜井 直人, Sakurai Naoto; born September 2, 1975) is a former Japanese football player.

== Playing career ==
Sakurai was born in Saitama on September 2, 1975. After graduating from high school, he joined his local club Urawa Reds in 1994. He debuted in 1995 and played several matches every season. However could not play many matches. In 1999, he moved to Verdy Kawasaki (later Tokyo Verdy). He became a regular player immediately and played many matches as forward good at dribbling for a long time. In 2005, he moved to newly was promoted to J1 League club, Omiya Ardija based in his local. Although he played many matches until 2006, he could hardly play in the match from 2007 and he retired end of 2008 season.

== Club statistics ==
| Club performance | | | League | | Cup | | League Cup | | Total | |
| Season | Club | League | Apps | Goals | Apps | Goals | Apps | Goals | Apps | Goals |
| Japan | | | League | | Emperor's Cup | | J.League Cup | | Total | |
|---|---|---|---|---|---|---|---|---|---|---|
| 1994 | Urawa Reds | J1 League | 0 | 0 | 0 | 0 | 0 | 0 | 0 | 0 |
| 1995 | Urawa Reds | J1 League | 5 | 0 | 0 | 0 | - | | 5 | 0 |
| 1996 | Urawa Reds | J1 League | 4 | 0 | 2 | 0 | 0 | 0 | 6 | 0 |
| 1997 | Urawa Reds | J1 League | 2 | 0 | 1 | 0 | 2 | 0 | 5 | 0 |
| 1998 | Urawa Reds | J1 League | 5 | 0 | 1 | 0 | 3 | 1 | 9 | 1 |
| 1999 | Urawa Reds | J1 League | 4 | 0 | 0 | 0 | 0 | 0 | 4 | 0 |
| 1999 | Verdy Kawasaki | J1 League | 14 | 4 | 2 | 1 | 2 | 0 | 18 | 5 |
| 2000 | Verdy Kawasaki | J1 League | 17 | 0 | 2 | 1 | 2 | 0 | 21 | 1 |
| 2001 | Tokyo Verdy | J1 League | 21 | 3 | 2 | 0 | 0 | 0 | 23 | 3 |
| 2002 | Tokyo Verdy | J1 League | 24 | 4 | 0 | 0 | 6 | 0 | 30 | 4 |
| 2003 | Tokyo Verdy | J1 League | 19 | 6 | 3 | 2 | 2 | 0 | 24 | 8 |
| 2004 | Tokyo Verdy | J1 League | 21 | 6 | 1 | 1 | 7 | 3 | 29 | 10 |
| 2005 | Omiya Ardija | J1 League | 19 | 4 | 3 | 0 | 6 | 0 | 28 | 4 |
| 2006 | Omiya Ardija | J1 League | 21 | 5 | 0 | 0 | 5 | 0 | 26 | 5 |
| 2007 | Omiya Ardija | J1 League | 7 | 0 | 1 | 0 | 0 | 0 | 8 | 0 |
| 2008 | Omiya Ardija | J1 League | 3 | 0 | 2 | 0 | 0 | 0 | 5 | 0 |
| Total | | | 186 | 32 | 20 | 5 | 35 | 4 | 241 | 41 |
