= Yoshiyuki Kobayashi =

Japanese footballer

Yoshiyuki Kobayashi 小林 慶行
Personal information
- Full name: Yoshiyuki Kobayashi
- Date of birth: January 27, 1978 (age 48)
- Place of birth: Saitama, Saitama, Japan
- Position: Midfielder

Team information
- Current team: JEF United Chiba (manager)

Youth career
- 1993–1995: Toin Gakuen High School

College career
Years	Team	Apps	(Gls)
1996–1998	Komazawa University		

Senior career*
Years	Team	Apps	(Gls)
1999–2005	Tokyo Verdy	156	(10)
2006–2009	Omiya Ardija	91	(10)
2009	Kashiwa Reysol	10	(0)
2010–2012	Albirex Niigata	53	(0)
Total		310	(20)

Managerial career
- 2014–2020: Vegalta Sendai (assistant)
- 2021–2023: JEF United Chiba (assistant)
- 2023–: JEF United Chiba
Medal record
Tokyo Verdy
Winner	Emperor's Cup	2004
- * Club domestic league appearances and goals

Yoshiyuki Kobayashi (小林 慶行, Kobayashi Yoshiyuki; born January 27, 1978) is a Japanese football manager and former player who is the manager of J1 League club JEF United Chiba.

His brother Ryo Kobayashi is also a former footballer.

== Club career ==
Kobayashi was born in Saitama on January 27, 1978. In 1999, when he was a Komazawa University student, he joined the J1 League club Verdy Kawasaki (later Tokyo Verdy). He became a regular player as a defensive midfielder during his first season. The club won the championship at the 2004 Emperor's Cup and the 2005 Japanese Super Cup. In the same year they were removed from the J1 League which marked his end in Tokyo. He signed with Omiya Ardija at the start of the 2006 season. As Omiya usually deployed a 4–4–2 formation, he usually played as a central/defensive midfielder. Kobayashi was the key player on the team, and at times the team's captain. However he gradually played less often during 2009. In June 2009, he moved to Kashiwa Reysol. On January 14, 2010, it was announced that Kobayashi had signed with Albirex Niigata. He played in many matches until 2011. However he did not play as much in 2012 and he retired at the end of the 2012 season, after a fourteen-year professional career.

== Managerial career ==
Kobayashi started his coaching career in June 2014, serving as a coach of Vegalta Sendai until 2019. In 2021, he joined JEF United Chiba also as a coach, and promoted to the role of head coach of the Chiba side in 2022.

On 1 November 2022, he was appointed manager of JEF United Chiba from 2023 season.

== Career statistics ==
Appearances and goals by club, season and competition
Club	Season	League			Emperor's Cup		J.League Cup		Total	
Club	Season	Division	Apps	Goals	Apps	Goals	Apps	Goals	Apps	Goals
Verdy Kawasaki	1999	J1 League	30	2	4	0	3	0	37	2
Verdy Kawasaki	2000	J1 League	11	0	0	0	2	0	13	0
Tokyo Verdy	2001	J1 League	19	0	2	0	0	0	21	0
Tokyo Verdy	2002	J1 League	23	1	1	0	0	0	24	1
Tokyo Verdy	2003	J1 League	18	1	0	0	4	1	22	2
Tokyo Verdy	2004	J1 League	29	4	5	2	8	2	42	8
Tokyo Verdy	2005	J1 League	26	2	1	0	6	2	33	4
Omiya Ardija	2006	J1 League	28	4	2	0	5	0	35	4
Omiya Ardija	2007	J1 League	33	3	0	0	6	1	39	4
Omiya Ardija	2008	J1 League	25	3	2	0	6	0	33	3
Omiya Ardija	2009	J1 League	5	0	0	0	1	0	6	0
Kashiwa Reysol	2009	J1 League	10	0	1	0	1	0	12	0
Albirex Niigata	2010	J1 League	28	0	2	0	5	0	35	0
Albirex Niigata	2011	J1 League	24	0	0	0	2	0	26	0
Albirex Niigata	2012	J1 League	1	0	0	0	3	0	4	0
Career total			310	20	20	2	54	6	384	28

== Managerial statistics ==
As of match played 6 June 2026

Managerial record by team and tenure
Team	Nat.	From	To	Record								Ref.
Team	Nat.	From	To	G	W	D	L	GF	GA	GD	Win %	Ref.
JEF United Chiba	(Japan)	1 February 2023	Present	149	66	28	55	219	187	+32	44.30	
Career Total				149	66	28	55	219	187	+32	44.30	
