= 2016 Kataller Toyama season =

Kataller Toyama
2016 season
- Manager: Yasutoshi Miura
- Stadium: Toyama Stadium
- J3 League: 6th

2016 Kataller Toyama season.

== J3 League ==
=== League table ===
Pos	Team	Pld	W	D	L	GF	GA	GD	Pts
3	Nagano Parceiro	30	15	7	8	33	22	+11	52
4	Blaublitz Akita	30	14	8	8	37	26	+11	50
5	Kagoshima United	30	15	5	10	39	29	+10	50
6	Kataller Toyama	30	13	10	7	37	29	+8	49
7	Fujieda MYFC	30	14	3	13	48	42	+6	45
8	FC Ryukyu	30	12	8	10	46	46	0	44
9	Gamba Osaka U-23	30	10	8	12	42	41	+1	38

Updated to match(es) played on 20 November 2016. Source: 2016 MEIJI YASUDA J3 LEAGUE League table
Rules for classification: 1) Points; 2) Goal difference; 3) Goals scored; 4th) head-to-head results; 5th) disciplinary points; 6th) draw

=== Match details ===
J3 League match details
Match	Date	Team	Score	Team	Venue	Attendance
1	2016.03.13	Kagoshima United FC	0-0	Kataller Toyama	Kagoshima Kamoike Stadium	4,452
2	2016.03.20	Kataller Toyama	1-1	Fukushima United FC	Toyama Stadium	4,055
3	2016.04.03	Kataller Toyama	2-1	Gamba Osaka U-23	Toyama Stadium	3,676
4	2016.04.10	FC Tokyo U-23	0-3	Kataller Toyama	Ajinomoto Field Nishigaoka	2,206
6	2016.04.24	FC Ryukyu	2-2	Kataller Toyama	Okinawa Athletic Park Stadium	948
7	2016.05.01	Oita Trinita	0-1	Kataller Toyama	Oita Bank Dome	8,313
8	2016.05.08	Kataller Toyama	2-0	AC Nagano Parceiro	Toyama Stadium	4,810
9	2016.05.15	Blaublitz Akita	1-0	Kataller Toyama	Akita Yabase Athletic Field	1,946
10	2016.05.22	Kataller Toyama	0-1	Tochigi SC	Toyama Stadium	4,469
11	2016.05.29	Grulla Morioka	1-1	Kataller Toyama	Iwagin Stadium	1,036
12	2016.06.12	Kataller Toyama	2-1	Cerezo Osaka U-23	Toyama Stadium	3,175
13	2016.06.19	SC Sagamihara	0-1	Kataller Toyama	Sagamihara Gion Stadium	5,668
14	2016.06.26	Kataller Toyama	1-0	YSCC Yokohama	Toyama Stadium	3,278
15	2016.07.03	Fujieda MYFC	2-1	Kataller Toyama	Shizuoka Stadium	1,856
16	2016.07.10	Kataller Toyama	1-3	Grulla Morioka	Toyama Stadium	2,710
17	2016.07.16	Fukushima United FC	1-1	Kataller Toyama	Aizu Athletic Park Stadium	1,154
18	2016.07.24	Kataller Toyama	2-1	Kagoshima United FC	Toyama Stadium	2,976
19	2016.07.31	AC Nagano Parceiro	0-0	Kataller Toyama	Minami Nagano Sports Park Stadium	10,377
20	2016.08.07	Kataller Toyama	0-1	Blaublitz Akita	Toyama Stadium	3,263
5	2016.08.13	Kataller Toyama	4-1	Gainare Tottori	Toyama Stadium	2,770
21	2016.09.11	Kataller Toyama	2-0	Fujieda MYFC	Toyama Stadium	3,045
22	2016.09.17	YSCC Yokohama	3-4	Kataller Toyama	NHK Spring Mitsuzawa Football Stadium	1,045
23	2016.09.25	Kataller Toyama	0-0	Oita Trinita	Toyama Stadium	4,760
24	2016.10.02	Gamba Osaka U-23	3-0	Kataller Toyama	Expo '70 Commemorative Stadium	1,073
25	2016.10.16	Kataller Toyama	0-0	FC Tokyo U-23	Toyama Stadium	5,081
26	2016.10.23	Gainare Tottori	0-1	Kataller Toyama	Chubu Yajin Stadium	1,408
27	2016.10.30	Tochigi SC	2-0	Kataller Toyama	Tochigi Green Stadium	5,295
28	2016.11.06	Kataller Toyama	1-1	FC Ryukyu	Toyama Stadium	2,691
29	2016.11.13	Cerezo Osaka U-23	2-3	Kataller Toyama	Kincho Stadium	1,365
30	2016.11.20	Kataller Toyama	1-1	SC Sagamihara	Toyama Stadium	3,354
