= Hiroki Aratani =

Japanese footballer

Hiroki Aratani 荒谷 弘樹
Personal information
- Full name: Hiroki Aratani
- Date of birth: August 6, 1975 (age 51)
- Place of birth: Takaoka, Toyama, Japan
- Height: 1.92 m (6 ft 3 1/2 in)
- Position: Goalkeeper

Youth career
- 1991–1993: Toyama Daiichi High School

Senior career*
Years	Team	Apps	(Gls)
1994–1997	Urawa Reds	0	(0)
1998	Kawasaki Frontale	0	(0)
1999–2008	Omiya Ardija	118	(0)
2009	Consadole Sapporo	30	(0)
2010–2011	Ventforet Kofu	22	(0)
Total		170	(0)
- * Club domestic league appearances and goals

Hiroki Aratani (荒谷 弘樹, Aratani Hiroki; born August 6, 1975) is a former Japanese football player.

== Playing career ==
Aratani was born in Takaoka on August 6, 1975. After graduating from high school, he joined J1 League club Urawa Reds in 1994. However he could not play at all in the match behind Hisashi Tsuchida and Yuki Takita. In 1998, he moved to Japan Football League club Kawasaki Frontale. However he could not play at all in the match behind Takeshi Urakami. In 1999, he moved to Omiya Ardija. Although he could not play at all in the match behind Atsushi Shirai until 2001, he debuted in 2002. Although he could not play at all in the match behind Eiji Kawashima in 2003, he became a regular goalkeeper after Kawashima left the club in 2004. In 2004, the club won the 2nd place and was promoted to J1. However he lost his position behind Koji Ezumi for injury in 2007 and he could not play at all in the match in 2008. In 2009, he moved to J2 club Consadole Sapporo. Although he played many matches in 2009 season, he resigned and moved to J2 club Ventforet Kofu in 2010. The club won the 2nd place in 2010 and was promoted to J1 from 2011. He retired end of 2011 season.

== Career statistics ==
Appearances and goals by club, season and competition
Club	Season	League			Emperor's Cup		J.League Cup		Total	
Club	Season	Division	Apps	Goals	Apps	Goals	Apps	Goals	Apps	Goals
Urawa Reds	1994	J1 League	0	0	0	0	0	0	0	0
Urawa Reds	1995	J1 League	0	0	0	0	—		0	0
Urawa Reds	1996	J1 League	0	0	0	0	0	0	0	0
Urawa Reds	1997	J1 League	0	0	0	0	0	0	0	0
Kawasaki Frontale	1998	Football League	0	0	0	0	0	0	0	0
Omiya Ardija	1999	J2 League	0	0	0	0	0	0	0	0
Omiya Ardija	2000	J2 League	0	0	0	0	0	0	0	0
Omiya Ardija	2001	J2 League	0	0	0	0	0	0	0	0
Omiya Ardija	2002	J2 League	12	0	0	0	—		12	0
Omiya Ardija	2003	J2 League	0	0	0	0	—		0	0
Omiya Ardija	2004	J2 League	27	0	2	0	—		29	2
Omiya Ardija	2005	J1 League	31	0	2	0	7	0	40	0
Omiya Ardija	2006	J1 League	31	0	2	0	4	0	37	0
Omiya Ardija	2007	J1 League	17	0	0	0	3	0	20	0
Omiya Ardija	2008	J1 League	0	0	0	0	3	0	3	0
Consadole Sapporo	2009	J2 League	30	0	0	0	—		30	0
Ventforet Kofu	2010	J2 League	9	0	2	0	—		11	0
Ventforet Kofu	2011	J1 League	13	0	1	0	1	0	15	0
Career total			170	0	9	0	18	0	197	0
