= 2011 Omiya Ardija season =

Omiya Ardija
2011 season
- Manager: Jun Suzuki
- J. League Division 1: 13th
- Emperor's Cup: Second round
- J. League Cup: Second round
Home colours	Away colours

The 2011 Omiya Ardija season was Omiya Ardija's seventh consecutive season in J. League Division 1. The club also competed in the 2011 J. League Cup, and the 2011 Emperor's Cup.

== Competitions ==
=== J. League ===
==== League table ====
Pos	Team	Pld	W	D	L	GF	GA	GD	Pts
11	Kawasaki Frontale	34	13	5	16	52	53	−1	44
12	Cerezo Osaka	34	11	10	13	67	53	+14	43
13	Omiya Ardija	34	10	12	12	38	48	−10	42
14	Albirex Niigata	34	10	9	15	38	46	−8	39
15	Urawa Red Diamonds	34	8	12	14	36	43	−7	36

Updated to match(es) played on December 3, 2011. Source: J.League Division 1
Rules for classification: 1st points; 2nd goal differential; 3rd goals scored; 4th head-to-head results; 5th disciplinary points; 6th draw. If two clubs are tied for first place, both clubs will be declared.

==== Results summary ====
6 March 2011 Round 1	Kashima Antlers	3–3	Omiya Ardija	Kashima Soccer Stadium
Sunday 15:00	Inoha 47', Iwamasa 58', Tsubouchi 90' (o.g.)	Report	11', 64' Lee, 49' Ueda	Attendance: 23,262; Referee: Yoshida

==== Results by round ====
Round	1	2	3	4	5	6	7	8	9	10	11	12	13	14	15	16	17	18	19	20	21	22	23	24	25	26	27	28	29	30	31	32	33	34
Ground	A																																	
Result	D																																	
Position	7																																	

Updated to match(es) played on 6 March 2011. Source: "World-Football.net".
A = Away; H = Home; W = Win; D = Draw; L = Loss

=== Emperor's Cup ===
2011-10-10 Second round	Omiya Ardija	1 – 1 (a.e.t.) (3–5 p)	Fukuoka University	Kumagaya Athletic Stadium, Kumagaya
13:00	Ueda 70'	Report	Tomohiro Tanaka 72'	Attendance: 1,500; Referee: Tomohiro Inoue
	Penalties
	Mariano (penalty scored); Watanabe (penalty scored); Higashi (penalty scored); Fujimoto (penalty missed)		(penalty scored) Suzu; (penalty scored) Nagatani; (penalty scored) Tamura; (penalty scored) Okada; (penalty scored) Kuroki
