= Leandro Euzébio =

Brazilian footballer (born 1981)

Personal information
- Full name: Leandro da Fonseca Euzébio
- Date of birth: August 18, 1981 (age 45)
- Place of birth: Cabo Frio, Brazil
- Height: 1.87 m (6 ft 2 in)
- Position: Central defender

Team information
- Current team: Cabofriense

Senior career*
Years	Team	Apps	(Gls)
2001	Fluminense		
2002	Rio das Ostras		
2003	Bonsucesso		
2004	América Mineiro		
2005	Cabofriense		
2005–2010	Cruzeiro		
2006	→ Náutico (loan)		
2007–2008	→ Omiya Ardija (loan)		
2009–2010	→ Goiás (loan)		
2010–2014	Fluminense		
2014	Al-Khor		
2015	Tupi		
2016–	Cabofriense		
2016	→ Anápolis (loan)		
2017–	→ Sergipe (loan)		
- * Club domestic league appearances and goals as of May 23, 2011

Leandro da Fonseca Euzébio (born August 18, 1981 in Cabo Frio), is a Brazilian central defender. After a very good season in 2006 playing for Náutico where he won the promotion for the first division he moved to Japan. He currently plays for Náutico.

== Honours ==
Cruzeiro

- Minas Gerais State League: 2006

Fluminense

- Brazilian Série A: 2010, 2012
- Campeonato Carioca: 2012
