= Alison (footballer, born 1982) =

Brazilian footballer

Personal information
- Full name: Alison Barros Moraes
- Date of birth: 30 June 1982 (age 44)
- Place of birth: Brazil
- Height: 1.71 m (5 ft 7 1/2 in)
- Position: Striker

Senior career*
Years	Team	Apps	(Gls)
2002–2003	Ulsan Hyundai Horang-i	17	(2)
2003–2005	Daejeon Citizen	46	(6)
2006	Marília		
2006–2007	Omiya Ardija	10	(1)
- * Club domestic league appearances and goals

Alison Barros Moraes (born 30 June 1982) is a Brazilian football player.

== Club statistics ==
Club performance			League		Cup		League Cup		Total	
Season	Club	League	Apps	Goals	Apps	Goals	Apps	Goals	Apps	Goals
Japan			League		Emperor's Cup		League Cup		Total	
2006	Omiya Ardija	J1 League	8	1	1	0	0	0	9	1
2007	Omiya Ardija	J1 League	2	0	0	0	0	0	2	0
Total	Japan		10	1	1	0	0	0	11	1
Career total			10	1	1	0	0	0	11	1
