= Taishi Tsukamoto =

Japanese footballer

Personal information
- Date of birth: July 4, 1985 (age 41)
- Place of birth: Saitama, Japan
- Height: 1.77 m (5 ft 9 1/2 in)
- Position: Defender

Youth career
- 2004–2007: Komazawa University

Senior career*
| Years | Team | Apps | (Gls) |
| 2008–2010 | Omiya Ardija | 27 | (2) |
| Total | | 27 | (2) |
- * Club domestic league appearances and goals

Taishi Tsukamoto (塚本 泰史, Tsukamoto Taishi; born July 4, 1985) is a former Japanese football player.

== Club statistics ==
| Club performance | | | League | | Cup | | League Cup | | Total | |
| Season | Club | League | Apps | Goals | Apps | Goals | Apps | Goals | Apps | Goals |
| Japan | | | League | | Emperor's Cup | | J.League Cup | | Total | |
|---|---|---|---|---|---|---|---|---|---|---|
| 2008 | Omiya Ardija | J1 League | 6 | 0 | 2 | 0 | 1 | 0 | 9 | 0 |
| 2009 | Omiya Ardija | J1 League | 21 | 2 | 0 | 0 | 1 | 0 | 22 | 2 |
| 2010 | Omiya Ardija | J1 League | 0 | 0 | 0 | 0 | 0 | 0 | 0 | 0 |
| Country | Japan | | 27 | 2 | 2 | 0 | 2 | 0 | 31 | 2 |
| Total | | | 27 | 2 | 2 | 0 | 2 | 0 | 31 | 2 |

== Personal life ==
On 28 February 2010 was announced that the 24-year-old Japanese is injured with the Osteosarcoma at the knee. Whether the defender can continue his career is still uncertain.
