= Kohei Tokita =

Japanese footballer

Kohei Tokita 土岐田 洸平
Personal information
- Full name: Kohei Tokita
- Date of birth: 16 March 1986 (age 40)
- Place of birth: Machida, Tokyo, Japan
- Height: 1.76 m (5 ft 9 in)
- Position: Right winger

Youth career
- 2004–2007: Hosei University

Senior career*
Years	Team	Apps	(Gls)
2008–2010	Omiya Ardija	51	(3)
2010–2014	Oita Trinita	113	(3)
2015–2018	Machida Zelvia	93	(1)
Total		257	(7)
- * Club domestic league appearances and goals

Kohei Tokita (土岐田 洸平, Tokita Kohei; born 16 March 1986) is a Japanese former football player.

== Career statistics ==
Appearances and goals by club, season and competition
Club	Season	League			Emperor's Cup		League Cup		Total	
Club	Season	Division	Apps	Goals	Apps	Goals	Apps	Goals	Apps	Goals
Omiya Ardija	2008	J1 League	22	1	1	0	6	0	29	1
Omiya Ardija	2009	J1 League	26	2	2	0	6	1	34	3
Omiya Ardija	2010	J1 League	3	0	-		1	0	4	0
Omiya Ardija	Total		51	3	3	0	13	1	67	4
Oita Trinita	2010	J2 League	17	1	2	0	-		19	1
Oita Trinita	2011	J2 League	34	1	2	0	-		36	1
Oita Trinita	2012	J2 League	23	0	0	0	-		23	0
Oita Trinita	2013	J1 League	21	1	3	0	3	0	27	1
Oita Trinita	2014	J2 League	18	0	2	0	-		20	0
Oita Trinita	Total		113	3	9	0	3	0	125	3
Machida Zelvia	2015	J3 League	28	1	2	0	–		30	1
Machida Zelvia	2016	J2 League	37	0	0	0	–		37	0
Machida Zelvia	2017	J2 League	11	0	1	0	–		12	0
Machida Zelvia	2018	J2 League	17	0	2	0	–		19	0
Machida Zelvia	Total		93	1	5	0	0	0	98	1
Career total			257	7	17	0	16	1	290	8
