= Takaya Kawanabe =

Japanese footballer

Personal information
- Full name: Takaya Kawanabe
- Date of birth: 22 December 1988 (age 37)
- Place of birth: Saitama, Japan
- Height: 1.74 m (5 ft 8 1/2 in)
- Position: Midfielder

Youth career
- 2004–2006: Omiya Ardija

Senior career*
Years	Team	Apps	(Gls)
2007–2010	Omiya Ardija	0	(0)
2011–2012	Tanjong Pagar United	53	(14)
2013	Jūrmala	8	(0)
2013	Mladost Podgorica	15	(0)
2014	Rudar Prijedor	3	(0)
- * Club domestic league appearances and goals

Takaya Kawanabe (川辺 隆弥, Kawanabe Takaya; born December 22, 1988) is a former Japanese football player.

== Club career ==
Takaya Kawanabe signed for Omiya Ardija in 2007. In 2011, he moved to Tanjong Pagar United FC and scored 9 goals in 36 appearances for the club. In February 2013 Kawanabe joined the Latvian Higher League club FC Jūrmala.

Later he played with FK Mladost Podgorica in the Montenegrin First League and next with FK Rudar Prijedor in the Premier League of Bosnia and Herzegovina.

== Club statistics ==
Club performance			League		Cup		League Cup		Continental		Total	
Season	Club	League	Apps	Goals	Apps	Goals	Apps	Goals	Apps	Goals	Apps	Goals
Japan			League		Emperor's Cup		J.League Cup		Continental		Total	
2007	Omiya Ardija	J1 League	0	0	0	0	1	0	0	0	1	0
2008	Omiya Ardija	J1 League	0	0	0	0	0	0	0	0	0	0
2009	Omiya Ardija	J1 League	0	0	0	0	1	0	0	0	1	0
Singapore			League		Singapore Cup		League Cup		Continental		Total	
2011	Tanjong Pagar United	S.League	31	7	1	0	1	1	0	0	33	8
2012	Tanjong Pagar United	S.League	22	7	1	0	3	0	0	0	26	7
Latvia			League		Latvian Cup		League Cup		Continental		Total	
2013	FC Jūrmala	Virslīga	8	0	1	0	0	0	0	0	9	0
Montenegro			League		Montenegrin Cup		League Cup		Continental		Total	
2013–2014	Mladost Podgorica	1. CFL	15	0	1	0	0	0	0	0	16	0
Bosnia and Herzegovina			League		Bosnian Cup		League Cup		Continental		Total	
2013–2014	Rudar Prijedor	BiH Premijer Liga	3	0	0	0	0	0	0	0	3	0
Country	Japan		0	0	0	0	2	0	0	0	2	0
Country	Singapore		53	14	2	0	4	1	0	0	59	15
Country	Latvia		8	0	1	0	0	0	0	0	9	0
Country	Montenegro		15	0	1	0	0	0	0	0	16	0
Country	Bosnia and Herzegovina		3	0	0	0	0	0	0	0	3	0
Total			79	14	4	0	6	1	0	0	91	15
