= Manabu Wakabayashi =

Japanese footballer

Personal information
- Date of birth: June 3, 1979 (age 47)
- Place of birth: Kanuma, Tochigi, Japan
- Height: 1.88 m (6 ft 2 in)
- Position: Forward

Team information
- Current team: Tochigi Uva FC
- Number: 25

Youth career
- 1995–1997: Utsunomiya Technical High School

Senior career*
Years	Team	Apps	(Gls)
1998–2003	Hitachi Tochigi		
2004–2005	Tochigi SC	49	(17)
2005–2007	Omiya Ardija	26	(3)
2008	Ehime FC	33	(2)
2009	Tochigi SC	38	(1)
2010–	Tochigi Uva FC	183	(41)
- * Club domestic league appearances and goals

Manabu Wakabayashi (若林 学, Wakabayashi Manabu; born June 3, 1979) is a Japanese football player. He plays for Tochigi Uva FC.

== Career statistics ==
Appearances and goals by club, season and competition
Club	Season	League			Emperor's Cup		J.League Cup		Total	
Club	Season	Division	Apps	Goals	Apps	Goals	Apps	Goals	Apps	Goals
Tochigi SC	2004	JFL	29	3	2	1	—		31	4
Tochigi SC	2005	JFL	20	14	—		—		20	14
Omiya Ardija	2005	J1 League	4	0	3	1	0	0	7	1
Omiya Ardija	2006	J1 League	9	0	1	1	5	0	15	1
Omiya Ardija	2007	J1 League	13	3	1	0	4	0	18	3
Ehime FC	2008	J2 League	33	2	0	0	—		33	2
Tochigi SC	2009	J2 League	38	1	1	0	—		39	1
Tochigi Uva FC	2010	JFL	32	7	1	1	—		33	8
Tochigi Uva FC	2011	JFL	28	14	1	1	—		29	15
Tochigi Uva FC	2012	JFL	23	8	—		—		23	8
Tochigi Uva FC	2013	JFL	25	1	2	0	—		27	1
Tochigi Uva FC	2014	JFL	21	3	1	0	—		22	3
Tochigi Uva FC	2015	JFL	27	3	1	0	—		28	3
Tochigi Uva FC	2016	JFL	27	5	0	0	—		27	5
Career total			329	64	14	5	9	0	352	69
