= Masahiko Ichikawa =

Japanese footballer

Personal information
- Date of birth: September 17, 1985 (age 41)
- Place of birth: Tokyo, Japan
- Height: 1.70 m (5 ft 7 in)
- Position: Forward

Youth career
- 2004–2007: Hosei University

Senior career*
Years	Team	Apps	(Gls)
2008–2012	Omiya Ardija	34	(1)
2011	→Tokyo Verdy (loan)	7	(1)
Total		41	(2)
- * Club domestic league appearances and goals

Masahiko Ichikawa (市川 雅彦, Ichikawa Masahiko; born September 17, 1985) is a former Japanese football player.

== Club statistics ==
Club performance			League		Cup		League Cup		Total	
Season	Club	League	Apps	Goals	Apps	Goals	Apps	Goals	Apps	Goals
Japan			League		Emperor's Cup		League Cup		Total	
2008	Omiya Ardija	J1 League	1	0	0	0	2	0	3	0
2009	Omiya Ardija	J1 League	9	1	2	2	2	0	13	3
2010	Omiya Ardija	J1 League								
Career total			10	1	2	2	4	0	16	3
