= Keiki Shimizu =

Japanese footballer

Keiki Shimizu 清水 慶記
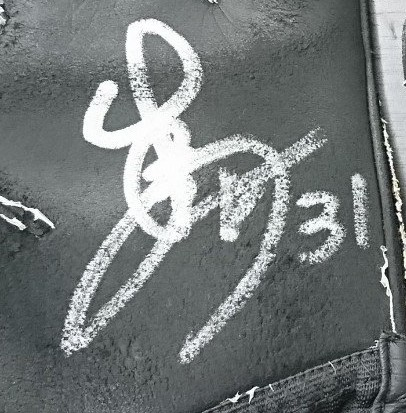
- Autograph in 2019

Personal information
- Full name: Keiki Shimizu
- Date of birth: December 10, 1985 (age 40)
- Place of birth: Maebashi, Gunma, Japan
- Height: 1.83 m (6 ft 0 in)
- Position: Goalkeeper

Youth career
- 2005–2007: Ryutsu Keizai University FC

Senior career*
Years	Team	Apps	(Gls)
2008–2019	Omiya Ardija	10	(0)
2016–2017	→ Thespakusatsu Gunma (loan)	73	(0)
2018	→ Blaublitz Akita (loan)	18	(0)
2020–2023	Thespakusatsu Gunma	3	(0)
- * Club domestic league appearances and goals as of 11:31, 7 July 2020 (UTC)

Keiki Shimizu (清水 慶記, Shimizu Keiki; born December 10, 1985) is a Japanese former professional footballer who played as a goalkeeper.

== Career statistics ==
Updated to 23 February 2020.

Appearances and goals by club, season and competition
Club	Season	League			Emperor's Cup		J.League Cup		Total	
Club	Season	Division	Apps	Goals	Apps	Goals	Apps	Goals	Apps	Goals
Omiya Ardija	2008	J1 League	0	0	0	0	0	0	0	0
Omiya Ardija	2009	J1 League	0	0	0	0	0	0	0	0
Omiya Ardija	2010	J1 League	0	0	0	0	0	0	0	0
Omiya Ardija	2011	J1 League	0	0	0	0	0	0	0	0
Omiya Ardija	2012	J1 League	0	0	0	0	1	0	1	0
Omiya Ardija	2013	J1 League	2	0	0	0	0	0	2	0
Omiya Ardija	2014	J1 League	8	0	3	0	2	0	13	0
Omiya Ardija	2015	J2 League	0	0	0	0	—		0	0
Thespakusatsu Gunma	2016	J2 League	42	0	1	0	—		43	0
Thespakusatsu Gunma	2017	J2 League	31	0	0	0	—		31	0
Blaublitz Akita	2018	J3 League	18	0	0	0	—		18	0
Omiya Ardija	2019	J2 League	0	0	0	0	—		0	0
Career total			101	0	4	0	3	0	108	0
