= Yusuke Murayama =

Japanese footballer

Yusuke Murayama 村山 祐介
Personal information
- Full name: Yusuke Murayama
- Date of birth: June 10, 1981 (age 45)
- Place of birth: Shizuoka, Japan
- Height: 1.80 m (5 ft 11 in)
- Position: Defender

Youth career
- 1997–1999: Júbilo Iwata
- 2000–2003: Kokushikan University

Senior career*
Years	Team	Apps	(Gls)
2004–2007	Shonan Bellmare	96	(4)
2007–2009	Omiya Ardija	30	(0)
2010	Oita Trinita	7	(0)
2013	Saraburi		
Total		133	(4)
- * Club domestic league appearances and goals

Yusuke Murayama (村山 祐介, Murayama Yūsuke; born June 10, 1981) is a former Japanese football player.

== Career statistics ==
Appearances and goals by club, season and competition
Club	Season	League			Emperor's Cup		J.League Cup		Total	
Club	Season	Division	Apps	Goals	Apps	Goals	Apps	Goals	Apps	Goals
Kokushikan University	2000	Football League	6	0			—		6	0
Kokushikan University	2001	Football League	5	0			—		5	0
Kokushikan University	2002	Football League	6	0			—		6	0
Kokushikan University	2003	Football League	3	0			—		3	0
Shonan Bellmare	2004	J2 League	35	4	1	0	—		36	4
Shonan Bellmare	2005	J2 League	30	0	1	0	—		31	0
Shonan Bellmare	2006	J2 League	21	0	2	1	—		23	1
Shonan Bellmare	2007	J2 League	10	0	0	0	—		10	0
Omiya Ardija	2007	J1 League	7	0	1	0	0	0	8	0
Omiya Ardija	2008	J1 League	21	0	0	0	4	0	25	0
Omiya Ardija	2009	J1 League	2	0	0	0	2	0	4	0
Oita Trinita	2010	J2 League	7	0	0	0	—		7	0
Career total			153	4	5	1	6	0	164	5
