= Yōsuke Kataoka =

Japanese footballer

Personal information
- Full name: Yōsuke Kataoka
- Date of birth: 26 May 1982 (age 44)
- Place of birth: Iruma District, Saitama, Japan
- Height: 1.79 m (5 ft 10 in)
- Position: Midfielder

Youth career
- 2001–2004: Kokushikan University

Senior career*
Years	Team	Apps	(Gls)
2005–2009	Omiya Ardija	122	(3)
2010	Kyoto Sanga	9	(0)
2011–2015	Omiya Ardija	76	(1)
2016–2017	Gainare Tottori	36	(1)
- * Club domestic league appearances and goals as of 2 February 2018

Yōsuke Kataoka (片岡 洋介, Kataoka Yōsuke; born 26 May 1982 in Iruma District, Saitama) is a former Japanese football player who lastly featured for Gainare Tottori.

== Career ==
After a five-years tenure and ten years with Omiya Ardija, Kataoka signed for Gainare Tottori in December 2015.

== Career statistics ==
Updated to 2 February 2018.

Appearances and goals by club, season and competition
Club	Season	League			Emperor's Cup		J.League Cup		Total	
Club	Season	Division	Apps	Goals	Apps	Goals	Apps	Goals	Apps	Goals
Kokushikan University	2001	JFL	12	0	—		—		12	0
Kokushikan University	2002	JFL	6	0			—		6	0
Kokushikan University	2003	JFL	10	1	—		—		10	1
Kokushikan University	2004	JFL	6	0	—		—		6	0
Omiya Ardija	2005	J1 League	8	0	3	1	4	1	15	2
Omiya Ardija	2006	J1 League	28	2	2	0	4	0	34	2
Omiya Ardija	2007	J1 League	32	0	1	0	6	0	39	0
Omiya Ardija	2008	J1 League	28	1	2	0	4	0	34	1
Omiya Ardija	2009	J1 League	26	0	1	0	4	0	31	0
Kyoto Sanga	2010	J1 League	9	0	0	0	2	0	11	0
Omiya Ardija	2011	J1 League	15	0	1	0	1	0	17	0
Omiya Ardija	2012	J1 League	11	0	0	0	4	0	15	0
Omiya Ardija	2013	J1 League	17	0	3	0	5	0	25	0
Omiya Ardija	2014	J1 League	17	0	0	0	3	0	20	0
Omiya Ardija	2015	J2 League	16	1	1	0	—		17	1
Gainare Tottori	2016	J3 League	24	1	2	0	—		26	1
Gainare Tottori	2017	J3 League	12	0	1	0	—		13	0
Career total			277	6	17	1	37	1	321	8
