= Terukazu Tanaka =

Japanese footballer

Terukazu Tanaka 田中 輝和
Personal information
- Full name: Terukazu Tanaka
- Date of birth: July 14, 1985 (age 41)
- Place of birth: Ibaraki, Osaka, Japan
- Height: 1.72 m (5 ft 7 1/2 in)
- Positions: Defender; midfielder

Youth career
- 1998–2000: Gamba Osaka
- 2001–2003: Yokkaichi Chuo Kogyo High School

Senior career*
Years	Team	Apps	(Gls)
2004–2008	Omiya Ardija	19	(0)
2009–2010	Yokohama FC	55	(0)
2010–2011	Sagan Tosu	32	(0)
2012	Real Salt Lake	4	(0)
2013	PTT Rayong	23	(2)
2014	Sisaket	19	(0)
2015	DRB-Hicom	4	(0)
2016–2017	Ang Thong	27	(0)
Total		183	(2)
- * Club domestic league appearances and goals

Terukazu Tanaka (田中 輝和, Tanaka Terukazu; born July 14, 1985) is a Japanese football player.

== Playing career ==
A product of Gamba Osaka U-15 alongside the Japanese superstar Keisuke Honda, Tanaka started his professional career in Japan with Omiya Ardija. He remained at the club for five seasons being selected to the Japan National Team U-21 in 2006, before joining Yokohama FC on loan in 2009. Following an impressive first season with Yokohama, Tanaka's contract was purchased by his new club. He began the 2010 season with Yokohama, but at the mid-way point of the season was sent on loan to Sagan Tosu and remained at the club for the 2011 season.

He was scouted at the Japan Pro-Footballers Association (JPFA) Tryout in Japan, and in February 2012, he came to the United States as a trialist for the MLS club Real Salt Lake during their preseason camp. On March 1, 2012, it was announced that Tanaka was signed by the club. Tanaka made his MLS debut as part of the Starting XI in a match against the Montreal Impact on April 4, 2012, becoming the second Japanese player in Major League Soccer (after Kosuke Kimura of the Colorado Rapids). On May 26 of the same year, his first assist in the MLS came on a goal by Alvaro Saborio in a match against FC Dallas.

Tanaka was released by the club following the signing of Kenny Mansally.

Following his departure from Major League Soccer he first signed with PTT Rayong F.C. in Thailand And in 2014, instantly was acquired by Sisaket F.C. in the Thai Premier League.

== Club statistics ==
Club performance			League		Cup		League Cup		Continental		Total	
Season	Club	League	Apps	Goals	Apps	Goals	Apps	Goals	Apps	Goals	Apps	Goals
Japan			League		Emperor's Cup		J.League Cup		Asia		Total	
2004	Omiya Ardija	J2 League	0	0	0	0	-		-		0	0
2005	Omiya Ardija	J1 League	0	0	0	0	0	0	-		0	0
2006	Omiya Ardija	J1 League	0	0	0	0	0	0	-		0	0
2007	Omiya Ardija	J1 League	10	0	0	0	3	0	-		13	0
2008	Omiya Ardija	J1 League	9	0	1	0	3	0	-		13	0
2009	Yokohama FC	J2 League	41	0	2	0	-		-		43	0
2010	Yokohama FC	J2 League	12	0	0	0	-		-		12	0
2010	Sagan Tosu	J2 League	11	0	2	0	-		-		13	0
2011	Sagan Tosu	J2 League	21	0	1	0	-		-		22	0
USA			League		Open Cup		-		North America		Total	
2012	Real Salt Lake	Major League Soccer	4	0	1	0	-	-	0	0	5	0
Thailand			League		Thai FA Cup		Thai League Cup		Asia		Total	
2013	PTT Rayong	Regional League Division 2	17	1	3	0	3	1	0	0	23	2
2014	Sisaket	Thai Premier League	17	0	1	0	1	0	0	0	19	0
Total	Japan		104	0	6	0	6	0	0	0	116	0
Total	USA		4	0	1	0	0	0	0	0	5	0
Total	Thailand		34	1	4	0	4	1	0	0	42	2
Career total			142	1	11	0	10	1	0	0	163	2
