= Hayato Hashimoto =

Japanese footballer

Hayato Hashimoto 橋本 早十
Personal information
- Full name: Hayato Hashimoto
- Date of birth: September 15, 1981 (age 45)
- Place of birth: Fukui, Japan
- Height: 1.75 m (5 ft 9 in)
- Position: Midfielder

Youth career
- 1997–1999: Maruoka High School
- 2000–2003: Komazawa University

Senior career*
Years	Team	Apps	(Gls)
2004–2013	Omiya Ardija	107	(5)
2014	Chonburi	2	(0)
2015	DRB-Hicom	1	(0)
Total		110	(5)
- * Club domestic league appearances and goals

Hayato Hashimoto (橋本 早十, Hashimoto Hayato; born September 15, 1981) is a Japanese former football player.

== Club statistics ==
Club performance			League		Cup		League Cup		Total	
Season	Club	League	Apps	Goals	Apps	Goals	Apps	Goals	Apps	Goals
Japan			League		Emperor's Cup		J.League Cup		Total	
2004	Omiya Ardija	J2 League	0	0	1	1	-		1	1
2005	Omiya Ardija	J1 League	1	0	0	0	0	0	1	0
2006	Omiya Ardija	J1 League	15	2	2	1	2	0	19	3
2007	Omiya Ardija	J1 League	22	0	0	0	4	0	26	0
2008	Omiya Ardija	J1 League	6	0	0	0	1	0	7	0
2009	Omiya Ardija	J1 League	33	2	2	0	4	0	39	2
2010	Omiya Ardija	J1 League								
Career total			77	4	5	2	11	0	93	6
