= Takuya Wada =

Japanese footballer (born 1990)

Takuya Wada 和田 拓也
Personal information
- Full name: Takuya Wada
- Date of birth: 28 July 1990 (age 36)
- Place of birth: Kanagawa, Japan
- Height: 1.70 m (5 ft 7 in)
- Position: Midfielder

Team information
- Current team: Ventforet Kofu

Youth career
- –2002: Meiji SSS
- 2006–2008: Tokyo Verdy

Senior career*
Years	Team	Apps	(Gls)
2009–2012	Tokyo Verdy	74	(0)
2013	Vegalta Sendai	4	(0)
2013–2017	Omiya Ardija	109	(2)
2018–2019	Sanfrecce Hiroshima	33	(2)
2019	→ Yokohama F. Marinos (loan)	10	(0)
2020–2021	Yokohama F. Marinos	24	(1)
2022–2024	Yokohama FC	73	(1)
2024–2026	Omiya Ardija / RB Omiya Ardija	40	(2)
2026–	Ventforet Kofu	0	(0)
- * Club domestic league appearances and goals as of 21:15, 10 June 2026 (UTC)

Takuya Wada (和田 拓也, born 28 July 1990) is a Japanese professional footballer who plays as a midfielder for J2 League club Ventforet Kofu.

== Career statistics ==
As of match played 6 June 2026

Appearances and goals by club, season and competition
Club	Season	League			Emperor's Cup		J.League Cup		Continental		Other		Total	
Club	Season	Division	Apps	Goals	Apps	Goals	Apps	Goals	Apps	Goals	Apps	Goals	Apps	Goals
Tokyo Verdy	2009	J2 League	5	0	0	0	—		—		—		5	0
Tokyo Verdy	2010	J2 League	10	0	0	0	—		—		—		10	0
Tokyo Verdy	2011	J2 League	20	0	1	0	—		—		—		21	0
Tokyo Verdy	2012	J2 League	39	0	2	0	—		—		—		41	0
Tokyo Verdy	Total		74	0	3	0	—		—		—		77	0
Vegalta Sendai	2013	J1 League	4	0	—		0	0	4 (Note: Appearances in AFC Champions League)	0	—		8	0
Omiya Ardija	2013	J1 League	9	0	2	0	—		—		—		11	0
Omiya Ardija	2014	J1 League	20	0	2	0	3	0	—		—		25	0
Omiya Ardija	2015	J2 League	34	2	2	0	—		—		—		36	2
Omiya Ardija	2016	J1 League	21	0	0	0	6	0	—		—		27	0
Omiya Ardija	2017	J1 League	25	0	0	0	0	0	—		—		25	0
Omiya Ardija	Total		109	2	6	0	9	0	—		—		124	2
Sanfrecce Hiroshima	2018	J1 League	33	2	1	0	0	0	—		—		34	2
Sanfrecce Hiroshima	2019	J1 League	0	0	0	0	0	0	2	0	—		2	0
Sanfrecce Hiroshima	Total		33	2	1	0	0	0	2	0	—		36	2
Yokohama F. Marinos (loan)	2019	J1 League	10	0	3	0	3	0	—		—		16	0
Yokohama F. Marinos	2020	J1 League	14	0	—		0	0	6	0	1 (Note: Appearance in Japanese Super Cup)	0	21	0
Yokohama F. Marinos	2021	J1 League	10	1	1	0	5	1	—		—		16	2
Yokohama F. Marinos	Total		34	1	4	0	8	1	6	0	1	0	53	2
Yokohama FC	2022	J2 League	35	1	1	0	—		—		—		36	1
Yokohama FC	2023	J1 League	17	0	2	0	2	0	—		—		21	0
Yokohama FC	2024	J2 League	21	0	2	0	2	0	—		—		25	0
Yokohama FC	Total		73	1	5	0	4	0	—		—		82	1
RB Omiya Ardija	2024	J3 League	15	2	0	0	0	0	—		—		15	2
RB Omiya Ardija	2025	J2 League	17	0	1	0	2	0	—		1 (Note: Appearance in J2 League promotion play-offs)	0	21	0
RB Omiya Ardija	2026	J2/J3	8	0	—		—		—		—		8	0
RB Omiya Ardija	Total		40	2	1	0	2	0	—		1	0	44	2
Career total			367	8	20	0	23	1	12	0	2	0	424	9

== Honours ==
RB Omiya Ardija

- J2 League: 2015
- J3 League: 2024

Yokohama F. Marinos

- J1 League: 2019
