= Shin Kanazawa =

Japanese footballer (born 1983)

Shin Kanazawa 金澤 慎
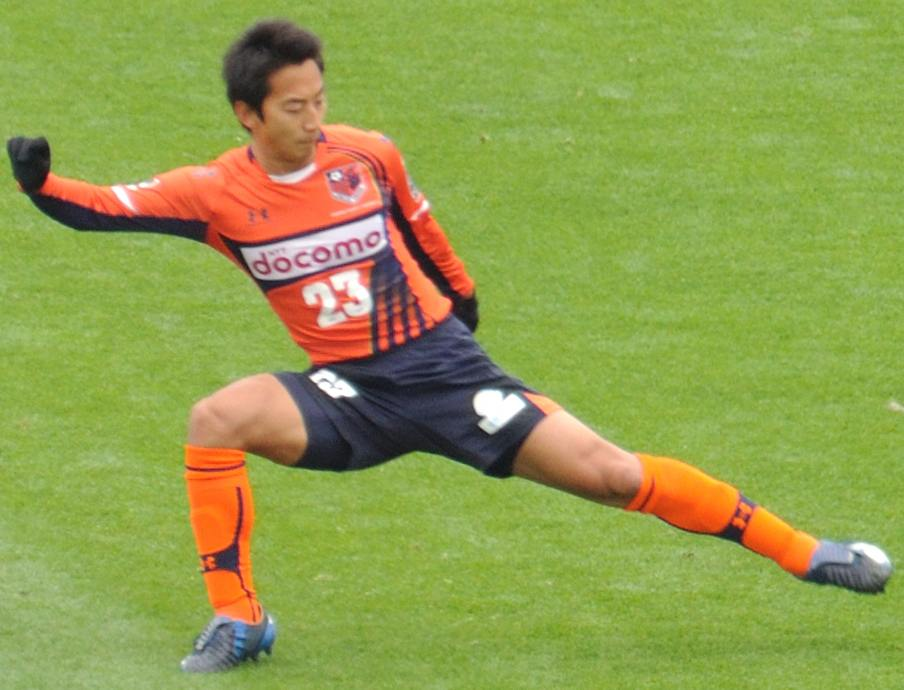

Personal information
- Full name: Shin Kanazawa
- Date of birth: 9 September 1983 (age 43)
- Place of birth: Saitama, Saitama, Japan
- Height: 1.75 m (5 ft 9 in)
- Position: Midfielder

Youth career
- 1999–2001: Omiya Ardija

Senior career*
Years	Team	Apps	(Gls)
2002–2019	Omiya Ardija	311	(11)
2006–2007	→ Tokyo Verdy (loan)	50	(3)
- * Club domestic league appearances and goals as of end of 2019 season

Shin Kanazawa (Japanese: 金沢 慎, Hepburn: Kanazawa Shin; born 9 September 1983) is a Japanese former professional footballer who played as a midfielder. He is the current first-team coach J2 League club of Omiya Ardija.

== Playing career ==
Kanazawa was born in Saitama on 9 September 1983. He joined J2 League club Omiya Ardija from youth team in 2002. He played many matches as defensive midfielder from first season and became a regular player in 2004. Ardija also won the 2nd place in 2004 season and was promoted to J1 League first time in the club history. However his opportunity to play decreased in 2005. He was loaned to newly was relegated to Tokyo Verdy in 2006. He played many matches in 2 seasons and Verdy was returned to J1 end of 2007 season. He returned to Ardija in 2008. He played many matches for the club for a long time. However Ardija repeated relegation to J2 and promotion to J1 from 2015. His opportunity to play decreased from 2017.

After the 2019 season, Kanazawa announced his retirement from professional football.

== Club statistics ==
As of end of 2019 season

Club performance			League		Cup		League Cup		Continental		Total	
Season	Club	League	Apps	Goals	Apps	Goals	Apps	Goals	Apps	Goals	Apps	Goals
Japan			League		Emperor's Cup		J.League Cup		AFC		Total	
2002	Omiya Ardija	J2 League	28	1	1	0	-		-		29	1
2003	Omiya Ardija	J2 League	7	0	2	0	-		-		9	0
2004	Omiya Ardija	J2 League	41	4	2	0	-		-		43	4
2005	Omiya Ardija	J1 League	17	0	3	0	4	0	-		24	0
2006	Tokyo Verdy (loan)	J2 League	30	0	1	0	-		2	0	33	0
2007	Tokyo Verdy (loan)	J2 League	20	3	1	0	-		-		21	3
2008	Omiya Ardija	J1 League	22	0	2	0	3	0	-		27	0
2009	Omiya Ardija	J1 League	29	0	2	0	6	0	-		37	0
2010	Omiya Ardija	J1 League	29	0	2	1	5	1	-		36	2
2011	Omiya Ardija	J1 League	18	1	0	0	1	1	-		19	2
2012	Omiya Ardija	J1 League	17	1	3	0	2	0	-		22	1
2013	Omiya Ardija	J1 League	25	2	1	0	3	0	-		29	2
2014	Omiya Ardija	J1 League	18	1	1	0	2	0	-		21	1
2015	Omiya Ardija	J2 League	23	1	2	0	-		-		25	1
2016	Omiya Ardija	J1 League	27	0	1	0	3	0	-		31	0
2017	Omiya Ardija	J1 League	10	0	3	0	1	0	-		14	0
2018	Omiya Ardija	J2 League	0	0	0	0	-		-		0	0
2019	Omiya Ardija	J2 League	0	0	0	0	-		-		0	0
Career total			361	14	27	1	30	2	2	0	420	17
