= 2012 Omiya Ardija season =

Omiya Ardija
2012 season
- Chairman: Seigo Watanabe
- Manager: Jun Suzuki
- J. League Division 1: 13th
- Emperor's Cup: Quarterfinals
- J. League Cup: Group Stage, 5th
| Home colours | Away colours |

The 2012 Omiya Ardija season was Omiya Ardija's eighth consecutive season in J. League Division 1. Omiya Ardija are also competing in the 2012 Emperor's Cup and 2012 J. League Cup.

== Competitions ==
=== J. League ===
==== League table ====
| Pos | Team | Pld | W | D | L | GF | GA | GD | Pts |
|---|---|---|---|---|---|---|---|---|---|
| 11 | Kashima Antlers | 34 | 12 | 10 | 12 | 50 | 43 | +7 | 46 |
| 12 | Júbilo Iwata | 34 | 13 | 7 | 14 | 57 | 53 | +4 | 46 |
| 13 | Omiya Ardija | 34 | 11 | 11 | 12 | 38 | 45 | −7 | 44 |
| 14 | Cerezo Osaka | 34 | 11 | 9 | 14 | 47 | 53 | −6 | 42 |
| 15 | Albirex Niigata | 34 | 10 | 10 | 14 | 29 | 34 | −5 | 40 |

Updated to match(es) played on 1 December 2012. Source: J.League Division 1
Rules for classification: 1) points; 2) goal difference; 3) number of goals scored.

==== Matches ====
| 10 March 2012 1 | Omiya Ardija | 0–1 | FC Tokyo | NACK5 Stadium |
| Saturday 19:04 JST | | Report | 61' Lucas | Attendance: 11,437; Referee: Iida |

| 17 March 2012 2 | Albirex Niigata | 1–2 | Omiya Ardija | Tohoku Denryoku Big Swan Stadium |
| Saturday 14:03 JST | Bruno Lopes 20' | Report | 68' Kikuchi; 83' Rafael | Attendance: 26,294; Referee: Iida |

| 24 March 2012 3 | Vegalta Sendai | 4–1 | Omiya Ardija | Yurtec Stadium Sendai |
| Saturday 13:03 | Ota 54', 82'; Own-Goal 60'; Sugai 73' | report | 8' Cho | Attendance: 11,831; Referee: Tojo |

| 31 March 2012 4 | Omiya Ardija | 1–1 | Nagoya Grampus | NACK5 Stadium Omiya |
| Saturday 13:03 | Kanakubo 55' | report | 48' Danilson | Attendance: 7,936; Referee: Matsuo |

| 7 April 2012 5 | Omiya Ardija | 0–3 | Cerezo Osaka | NACK5 Stadium Omiya |
| 17:00 | Shimohira (yellow card) 9'; Watabe (yellow card) 52' | Report | Kiyotake 53' (pen.); Kim Bo-Kyung 55', 67' (yellow card) 58'; Takahashi (yellow card) 60' | Attendance: 8,180; Referee: (Japan) Yuichi Nishimura |

| 14 April 2012 6 | Yokohama F. Marinos | 1–1 | Omiya Ardija | International Stadium Yokohama |
| 15:00 | Ono 53'; Nakamura (yellow card) 78'; Dutra (yellow card) 81' | Report | Carlinhos Paraíba (yellow card) 44'; Hasegawa 82' | Attendance: 7,101; Referee: (Japan) Masaaki Iemoto |

| 21 April 2012 7 | Omiya Ardija | 2–0 | Urawa Red Diamonds | NACK5 Stadium Omiya |
| 15:00 | Cho Young-Cheol 8'; Rafael Mariano 27' | Report | Haraguchi (yellow card) 76'; Kashiwagi (yellow card) 86' | Attendance: 12,709; Referee: (Japan) Jumpei Iida |

| 28 April 2012 8 | Omiya Ardija | 2–1 | Consadole Sapporo | NACK5 Stadium Omiya |
| 17:00 | Carlinhos Paraíba 10'; Aoki 71' | Report | Takaki 45+1'; Maeda (yellow card) 85' | Attendance: 8,435; Referee: (Japan) Yudai Yamamoto |

| 3 May 2012 9 | Vissel Kobe | 3–0 | Omiya Ardija | Home's Stadium Kobe |
| 15:00 | Ogawa 3'; Lee Kwang-Seon (yellow card) 42' (goal) 60'; Okui (yellow card) 63'; Mogi 68' | Report | Cho Young-Cheol (yellow card) 55'; Tsubouchi (yellow card) 60' | Attendance: 11,672; Referee: (Japan) Minoru Tojo |

| 6 May 2012 10 | Omiya Ardija | 1–0 | Gamba Osaka | NACK5 Stadium Omiya |
| 18:00 | Fukaya (yellow card) 7'; Aoki (yellow card) 57'; Cho Young-Cheol 74' | Report | Terada (yellow card) 15' | Attendance: 11,554; Referee: (Japan) Hajime Matsuo |

| 12 May 2012 11 | Sagan Tosu | 1–1 | Omiya Ardija | Tosu Stadium |
| 15:00 | Noda (yellow card) 10'; Niwa (yellow card) 21'; Hasegawa 90+1' (o.g.) | Report | Cho Young-Cheol (yellow card) 25'; Kikuchi (yellow card) 42'; Aoki 82' | Attendance: 7,833; Referee: (Japan) Hiroyoshi Takayama |

| 19 May 2012 12 | Omiya Ardija | 0–2 | Kawasaki Frontale | NACK5 Stadium Omiya |
| 17:00 | Aoki (yellow card) 35'; Carlinhos Paraíba (yellow card) 52'; Kataoka (yellow card) 83' | Report | Oshima 67'; Kusukami 72' | Attendance: 9,304; Referee: (Japan) Futoshi Nakamura |

| 26 May 2012 13 | Júbilo Iwata | 4–0 | Omiya Ardija | Yamaha Stadium |
| 17:00 | Yamada 10' (yellow card) 41'; Maeda 29', 79'; Matsuura 46'; Hatta (yellow card) 71'; Yamazaki (yellow card) 86' | Report | Ueda (yellow card) 44'; Rafael Mariano (yellow card) 69' | Attendance: 10,752; Referee: (Japan) Yoshiro Imamura |

| 16 June 2012 14 | Omiya Ardija | 2–4 | Kashiwa Reysol | NACK5 Stadium Omiya |
| 20:00 | Carlinhos Paraíba 10' (yellow card) 35'; Kikuchi (yellow card) 32'; Cho Young-Cheol 58' (yellow card) 61' | Report | Leandro Domingues 23'; Jorge Wagner 26'; Masushima (yellow card) 28'; Kudo 34', 47' | Attendance: 9,025; Referee: (Japan) Jumpei Iida |

| 23 June 2012 15 | Sanfrecce Hiroshima | 0–0 | Omiya Ardija | Hiroshima Big Arch |
| 19:30 | | Report | | Attendance: 15,304; Referee: (Japan) Itaru Hirose |

| 30 June 2012 16 | Omiya Ardija | 1–0 | Shimizu S-Pulse | NACK5 Stadium Omiya |
| 20:00 | Shimohira (yellow card) 73'; Watabe 90+1' | Report | | Attendance: 12,147; Referee: (Japan) Futoshi Nakamura |

| 7 July 2012 17 | Kashima Antlers | 1–0 | Omiya Ardija | Kashima Soccer Stadium |
| 19:30 | Nishi 74'; Dutra (yellow card) 80' | Report | Higashi (yellow card) 63' | Attendance: 12,787; Referee: (Japan) Yuichi Nishimura |

| 14 July 2012 18 | Omiya Ardija | 2–2 | Vissel Kobe | NACK5 Stadium Omiya |
| 20:00 | Shimizu 27' (yellow card) 38'; Kikuchi (yellow card) 38'; Watabe 67' | Report | Tanaka 20'; Soma (yellow card) 56'; Tashiro 74' | Attendance: 9,635; Referee: (Japan) Kenji Ogiya |

| 28 July 2012 19 | Kawasaki Frontale | 4–1 | Omiya Ardija | Todoroki Athletics Stadium |
| 20:00 | Nakamura 45+4'; Kobayashi 47' (pen.); Kuukami (yellow card) 51' (goal) 69'; Renatinho 71' | Summary | Hasegawa 19'; Cho Young-Cheol (yellow card) 33'; Kikuchi (yellow card) 46' | Attendance: 14,716; Referee: (Japan) Toshimitsu Yoshida |

| 4 August 2012 20 | Gamba Osaka | 3–1 | Omiya Ardija | Osaka Expo '70 Stadium |
| 20:00 | Kurata (yellow card) 58' (goal) 71'; Leandro 64' (pen.), 65' (yellow card) 66' | Summary | Carlinhos Paraíba (yellow card) 38'; Hasegawa 52' (yellow card) 64'; Ezumi (yellow card) 62'; Ljubijankič (yellow card) 72' | Attendance: 12,964; Referee: (Japan) Minoru Tojo |

| 11 August 2012 21 | Omiya Ardija | 1–2 | Sanfrecce Hiroshima | NACK5 Stadium Omiya |
| 20:00 | Ljubijankič 38' (pen.); Kanazawa (yellow card) 47'; Aoki (yellow card) 56' | Summary | Kikuchi 24' (o.g.); Shimizu 49' | Attendance: 11,057; Referee: (Japan) Yudai Yamamoto |

| 18 August 2012 22 | Tokyo | 0–1 | Omiya Ardija | Ajinomoto Stadium |
| 19:30 | Hasegawa (yellow card) 56' | Summary | Higashi (yellow card) 33'; Novaković 78' | Attendance: 18,342; Referee: (Japan) Futoshi Nakamura |

| 25 August 2012 23 | Omiya Ardija | 1–3 | Vegalta Sendai | NACK5 Stadium Omiya |
| 20:00 | Hasegawa 25' (yellow card) 38'; Kataoka (yellow card) 65' | Summary | Wilson 45'; Kamata 57'; Matsushita 90+3' | Attendance: 11,993; Referee: (Japan) Masaaki Iemoto |

| 1 September 2012 24 | Urawa Red Diamonds | 1–1 | Omiya Ardija | Saitama Stadium 2002 |
| 19:00 | Haraguchi 11'; Nagata (yellow card) 57' | Summary | Novaković (yellow card) 15' (yellow-red card) 18'; Carlinhos Paraíba (yellow card) 37'; Higashi 45+1'; Kikuchi (yellow card) 90+4'; Ueda (yellow card) 90+5' | Attendance: 39,814; Referee: (Japan) Toshimitsu Yoshida |

| 15 September 2012 25 | Omiya Ardija | 1–0 | Sagan Tosu | NACK5 Stadium Omiya |
| 19:30 | | | | Attendance: 10,012; Referee: (Japan) |

| 22 September 2012 26 | Consadole Sapporo | 0–5 | Omiya Ardija | Sapporo Dome |
| 15:00 | | | | Attendance: 7,474; Referee: (Japan) |

| 29 September 2012 27 | Omiya Ardija | 0–0 | Yokohama F. Marinos | NACK5 Stadium Omiya |
| 17:00 | | | | Attendance: 11,316; Referee: (Japan) |

| 6 October 2012 28 | Nagoya Grampus | 0–0 | Omiya Ardija | Toyota Stadium |
| 16:00 | | | | Attendance: 8,793; Referee: (Japan) |

| 20 October 2012 29 | Omiya Ardija | 1–1 | Albirex Niigata | NACK5 Stadium Omiya |
| 16:00 | | | | Attendance: 11,944; Referee: (Japan) |

| 27 October 2012 30 | Kashiwa Reysol | 1–4 | Omiya Ardija | Hitachi Kashiwa Soccer Stadium |
| 15:00 | | | | Attendance: 12,167; Referee: (Japan) |

| 7 November 2012 31 | Omiya Ardija | 0–0 | Kashima Antlers | NACK5 Stadium Omiya |
| 19:00 | | | | Attendance: 12,021; Referee: (Japan) |

| 17 November 2012 32 | Cerezo Osaka | 1–3 | Omiya Ardija | Kincho Stadium |
| 17:00 | | | | Attendance: 9,765; Referee: (Japan) |

| 24 November 2012 33 | Omiya Ardija | 2–0 | Júbilo Iwata | NACK5 Stadium Omiya |
| 17:30 | | | | Attendance: 12,126; Referee: (Japan) |

| 1 December 2012 34 | Shimizu S-Pulse | 0–0 | Omiya Ardija | Outsourcing Stadium Nihondaira |
| 15:30 | | | | Attendance: 14,729; Referee: (Japan) |

Source: https://web.archive.org/web/20150412093616/http://www.jleague.jp/en/stats/SFMS01.html

=== J. League Cup ===
==== Group B ====
| Team | Pld | W | D | L | GF | GA | GD | Pts |
|---|---|---|---|---|---|---|---|---|
| Shimizu S-Pulse | 6 | 5 | 0 | 1 | 12 | 4 | +8 | 15 |
| Kashima Antlers | 6 | 5 | 0 | 1 | 10 | 5 | +5 | 15 |
| Albirex Niigata | 6 | 3 | 1 | 2 | 6 | 5 | +1 | 10 |
| Yokohama F. Marinos | 6 | 1 | 2 | 3 | 7 | 9 | −2 | 5 |
| Omiya Ardija | 6 | 1 | 2 | 3 | 7 | 10 | −3 | 5 |
| Consadole Sapporo | 6 | 1 | 2 | 3 | 6 | 11 | −5 | 5 |
| Vissel Kobe | 6 | 1 | 1 | 4 | 6 | 10 | −8 | 4 |

| 20 March 2012 Group B | Omiya Ardija | 1–1 | Yokohama F. Marinos | NACK5 Stadium Omiya |
| Tuesday 16:00 | Carlinhos 15' | Report | 84' Saito | Attendance: 7,845; Referee: Yoshida |

| 4 April 2012 Group B | Kashima Antlers | 1–0 | Omiya Ardija | Kashima Soccer Stadium |
| Wednesday 19:00 | Koroki 31' | Report | | Attendance: 6,515; Referee: Murakami |

| 16 April 2012 Group B | Omiya Ardija | 1–1 | Consadole Sapporo | NACK5 Stadium Omiya |
| 20:00 | Cho Young-Cheol 53' | Report | Maeda 88' (yellow card) 89'; Nara (yellow card) 90+4' | Attendance: 4,359; Referee: (Japan) Tetsuro Yoshida |

| 6 June 2012 Group B | Omiya Ardija | 1–0 | Vissel Kobe | NACK5 Stadium Omiya |
| 20:00 | Aoki 31' (yellow card) 40'; Carlinhos Paraíba (yellow card) 58'; Shimohira (yellow card) 74' | Report | Bae Chun-Suk (red card) 70'; Ōkubo (yellow card) 74' | Attendance: 4,204; Referee: (Japan) Nobutsugu Murakami |

| 9 June 2012 Group B | Shimizu S-Pulse | 3–1 | Omiya Ardija | Outsourcing Stadium Nihondaira |
| 14:00 | Hiraoka 41'; Omae 72' (pen.); Shirasaki 88' | Report | Kikuchi (yellow card) 7'; Hasegawa 36'; Higashi (yellow card) 62'; Fukaya (red card) 70'; Murakami (yellow card) 90+4' | Attendance: 10,596; Referee: (Japan) Yuichi Nishimura |

| 27 June 2012 Group B | Albirex Niigata | 4–3 | Omiya Ardija | Tohoku Electric Power Big Swan Stadium |
| 20:00 | Kogure 61'; Hirai 73'; Suzuki 90'; Suzuki 90+4' | Report | Shimizu 15', 48'; Watanabe 40' | Attendance: 7,664; Referee: (Japan) Toshimitsu Yoshida |

=== Emperor's Cup ===
| 9 September 2012 2 | Omiya Ardija | 2–0 | Blaublitz Akita | Kumagaya Athletic Stadium |
| 13:00 | | | | Attendance: 1,439; Referee: Nobutsugu Murakami |

| 10 October 2012 3 | Omiya Ardija | 3–1 | Avispa Fukuoka | Kumagaya Athletic Stadium |
| 19:00 | | | | Attendance: 1,212; Referee: Toshimitsu Yoshida |

| 15 December 2012 4 | Omiya Ardija | 4–3 | Kawasaki Frontale | Ōmiya Park Soccer Stadium |
| 13:00 | | | | Attendance: 7,503; Referee: Kimura |

| 23 December 2012 Quarterfinals | Omiya Ardija | 2–3 | Kashiwa Reysol | Kumagaya Athletic Stadium |
| 13:00 | | | | Attendance: 7,090; Referee: Yuichi Nishimura |
