= Takamitsu Tomiyama =

Japanese footballer

Takamitsu Tomiyama 富山 貴光
Personal information
- Full name: Takamitsu Tomiyama
- Date of birth: 26 December 1990 (age 35)
- Place of birth: Tochigi, Japan
- Height: 1.80 m (5 ft 11 in)
- Position: Forward

Team information
- Current team: RB Omiya Ardija
- Number: 28

Youth career
- HollyHock SS Tochigi
- FC Tochigi
- 2006–2008: Yaita Chuo High School

College career
Years	Team	Apps	(Gls)
2009–2012	Waseda University		

Senior career*
Years	Team	Apps	(Gls)
2013–2015	Omiya Ardija	53	(4)
2016–2017	Sagan Tosu	33	(5)
2017	→ Albirex Niigata (loan)	5	(0)
2018–	Omiya Ardija	156	(22)
2021	→ Giravanz Kitakyushu (loan)	39	(7)

International career
2010	Japan U23	5	(1)
Medal record
Representing Japan
Asian Games
Gold medal – first place	2010 Guangzhou	Team
- * Club domestic league appearances and goals as of 23:08, 8 December 2025 (UTC)

Takamitsu Tomiyama (富山 貴光, Tomiyama Takamitsu; born 26 December 1990) is a Japanese professional footballer who plays as a forward for J2 League club RB Omiya Ardija.

== Career ==
Tomiyama made his debut for Omiya Ardija in the J. League Division 1 on 2 March 2013 against Shimizu S-Pulse in which he came on as an 80th-minute substitute for Daigo Watanabe as Ardija lost the match 4–2. Tomiyama then scored his first goal of his career in the J. League on 16 March 2013 against Albirex Niigata in which he scored after 70 minutes to give Ardija the lead before Niigata scored the equalizer and the match finished 1–1.

== Career statistics ==
As of match played 4 October 2025

Appearances and goals by club, season and competition
Club	Season	League			Emperor's Cup		J. League Cup		Continental		Total	
Club	Season	Division	Apps	Goals	Apps	Goals	Apps	Goals	Apps	Goals	Apps	Goals
Omiya Ardija	2013	J. League Division 1	26	3	2	0	4	1	—		32	4
Omiya Ardija	2014	J. League Division 1	15	0	2	1	5	0	—		22	1
Omiya Ardija	2015	J2 League	12	1	1	1	—		—		13	2
Omiya Ardija	Total		53	4	5	2	9	1	—		67	7
Sagan Tosu	2016	J1 League	25	5	1	1	5	1	—		31	7
Sagan Tosu	2017	J1 League	8	0	1	0	5	3	—		14	3
Sagan Tosu	Total		33	5	2	1	10	4	—		45	10
Albirex Niigata (loan)	2017	J1 League	5	0	—		—		—		5	0
Omiya Ardija	2018	J2 League	33	3	1	0	—		1 (Note: Appearance in J2 League promotion play-offs)	0	35	3
Omiya Ardija	2019	J2 League	13	1	1	0	—		—		14	1
Omiya Ardija	2020	J2 League	29	4	0	0	—		—		29	4
Omiya Ardija	2022	J2 League	32	8	1	1	—		—		33	9
Omiya Ardija	2023	J2 League	31	5	0	0	—		—		31	5
Omiya Ardija	2024	J3 League	11	1	2	0	1	0	—		14	1
Omiya Ardija	2025	J2 League	7	0	0	0	2	1	0	0	9	1
Omiya Ardija	Total		156	22	5	1	2	1	—		165	24
Giravanz Kitakyushu (loan)	2021	J2 League	39	7	1	0	—		—		40	7
Career total			286	38	13	4	21	6	0	0	322	48

== Honours ==
RB Omiya Ardija

- J3 League: 2024
