= Ryūji Bando =

Japanese footballer (born 1979)

Ryuji Bando 播戸 竜二
Personal information
- Full name: Ryuji Bando
- Date of birth: August 2, 1979 (age 47)
- Place of birth: Himeji, Hyogo, Japan
- Height: 1.71 m (5 ft 7 in)
- Position: Forward

Youth career
- 1992–1994: Kodera Junior High School
- 1995–1997: Kotogaoka High School

Senior career*
Years	Team	Apps	(Gls)
1998–1999	Gamba Osaka	34	(3)
2000–2001	Consadole Sapporo	57	(24)
2002–2005	Vissel Kobe	99	(30)
2006–2009	Gamba Osaka	97	(28)
2010–2013	Cerezo Osaka	56	(17)
2013–2014	Sagan Tosu	11	(0)
2015–2017	Omiya Ardija	23	(5)
2018	FC Ryukyu	19	(2)
Total		396	(109)

International career
1998–1999	Japan U-20	11	(2)
2006–2008	Japan	7	(2)
Medal record
Gamba Osaka
Winner	AFC Champions League	2008
Winner	J.League Cup	2007
Winner	Emperor's Cup	2008
Winner	Emperor's Cup	2009
Runner-up	Emperor's Cup	2006
Representing Japan
FIFA U-20 World Cup
Silver medal – second place	1999 Nigeria
AFC U-19 Championship
Silver medal – second place	1998 Thailand
- * Club domestic league appearances and goals

Ryuji Bando (播戸 竜二, Bando Ryūji; born August 2, 1979) is a Japanese former football player.

== Club career ==
Bando was born in Himeji on August 2, 1979. After graduating from high school, he joined J1 League club Gamba Osaka in 1998. He played many matches as substitute forward. He was transferred to J2 League club Consadole Sapporo in 2000. He scored 15 goals and helped them to promote to J1. He moved to Vissel Kobe in 2002 based in his local Hyogo Prefecture and became one of the key players in the team. He scored 17 goals in the 2004 season, which made him the third most prolific goalscorer in the league. He then returned to Gamba in 2006. He scored 16 goals and his good form earned him a call-up to the national team. In 2007, Gamba won the champions in J.League Cup. Although he could not play many matches for injury in 2008, Gamba won the champions in AFC Champions League first Asian title in the club history. Gamba also won the 2008 Emperor's Cup. At Emperor's Cup Final, he played as substitute forward and scored a winning goal in extra time. However his opportunity to play decreased behind new player Cho Jae-jin and Leandro in 2009. In 2010, Bando moved to Osaka's cross town rivals, Cerezo Osaka. Although he played many matches as substitute forward, he scored 10 goals in 2011. However he could hardly play in the match in 2013. In July, he moved to Sagan Tosu. However he could not play many matches. In 2015, he moved to J2 club Omiya Ardija. He played many matches in 2015 and Ardija was promoted to J1. However he could hardly play in the match from 2016. In 2018, he move to J3 League club FC Ryukyu. He played many matches and the club won the champions in 2018. Although the club was promoted to J2 from 2019, he left the club end of 2018 season.

== International career ==
He represented Japan at the Under-19 and Under-20 levels. He was a member of the Japan U-20 national team for 1999 World Youth Championship held in Nigeria. He made his senior national team debut on October 4, 2006, in a friendly match against Ghana when he replaced Satoru Yamagishi in the 67th minute. His first goal for his country came on October 11, 2006 in a 2007 Asian Cup qualification against India. He was chosen for the 2007 Asian Cup finals but had to withdraw due to injury.

== Career statistics ==
=== Club ===
Appearances and goals by club, season and competition
Club	Season	League			Emperor's Cup		J.League Cup		Asia		Total	
Club	Season	Division	Apps	Goals	Apps	Goals	Apps	Goals	Apps	Goals	Apps	Goals
Gamba Osaka	1998	J1 League	13	2	1	0	4	1	-		18	3
Gamba Osaka	1999	J1 League	21	1	2	0	2	0	-		25	1
Gamba Osaka	Total		34	3	3	0	6	1	-		43	4
Consadole Sapporo	2000	J2 League	30	15	1	1	1	0	-		32	16
Consadole Sapporo	2001	J1 League	27	9	1	0	1	0	-		29	9
Consadole Sapporo	Total		57	24	2	1	2	0	-		61	25
Vissel Kobe	2002	J1 League	26	4	0	0	5	0	-		31	4
Vissel Kobe	2003	J1 League	27	7	3	1	6	0	-		36	8
Vissel Kobe	2004	J1 League	28	17	1	0	5	3	-		34	20
Vissel Kobe	2005	J1 League	18	2	0	0	6	0	-		24	2
Vissel Kobe	Total		99	30	4	1	22	3	-		125	34
Gamba Osaka	2006	J1 League	30	16	4	1	2	0	6	1	42	18
Gamba Osaka	2007	J1 League	31	9	4	2	10	2	-		45	13
Gamba Osaka	2008	J1 League	15	1	5	1	1	0	7	2	28	4
Gamba Osaka	2009	J1 League	21	2	3	1	2	0	4	0	30	3
Gamba Osaka	Total		97	28	16	5	15	2	17	3	145	38
Cerezo Osaka	2010	J1 League	18	5	3	1	5	1	-		26	7
Cerezo Osaka	2011	J1 League	21	10	4	2	1	0	3	1	26	13
Cerezo Osaka	2012	J1 League	17	2	2	0	4	1	-		23	3
Cerezo Osaka	2013	J1 League	0	0	0	0	2	0	-		2	0
Cerezo Osaka	Total		56	17	9	3	12	2	3	1	80	23
Sagan Tosu	2013	J1 League	6	0	1	1	0	0	-		7	1
Sagan Tosu	2014	J1 League	5	0	0	0	4	2	-		9	2
Sagan Tosu	Total		11	0	1	1	4	2	-		16	3
Omiya Ardija	2015	J2 League	22	5	3	1	-		-		25	6
Omiya Ardija	2016	J1 League	1	0	2	0	0	0	-		3	0
Omiya Ardija	2017	J1 League	0	0	0	0	3	1	-		3	1
Omiya Ardija	Total		23	5	5	1	3	1	-		31	7
FC Ryukyu	2018	J3 League	19	2	1	0	-		-		20	2
Career total			396	109	41	12	64	11	20	4	521	136

=== International ===
Appearances and goals by national team and year
National team	Year	Apps	Goals
Japan national team	2006	2	2
Japan national team	2007	1	0
Japan national team	2008	4	0
Total		7	2

Appearances in major competitions
Team	Competition	Category	Appearances		Goals	Team Record
Team	Competition	Category	Start	Sub	Goals	Team Record
Japan	1999 FIFA World Youth Championship	U-20	0	5	0	Runners-up
Japan	2007 AFC Asian Cup qualification	Senior	1	0	2	Qualified

List of international goals scored by Ryūji Bando
No.	Date	Venue	Opponent	Score	Result	Competition
1.	October 11, 2006	Bangalore, India	India	3-0	Won	2007 AFC Asian Cup qualification
2.	October 11, 2006	Bangalore, India	India	3-0	Won	2007 AFC Asian Cup qualification

== Team honors ==
Gamba Osaka

- AFC Champions League - 2008
- Emperor's Cup - 2008, 2009
- J.League Cup - 2007
- Japanese Super Cup - 2007

Japan

- FIFA World Youth Championship - 1999 (Runners-up)
