= Norio Suzuki (footballer) =

Japanese footballer (born 1984)

Norio Suzuki 鈴木 規郎
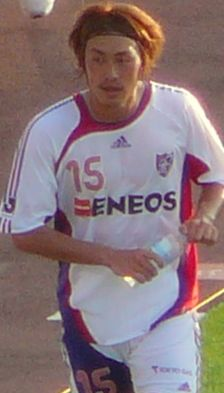
- Suzuki with FC Tokyo in June 2007

Personal information
- Date of birth: February 14, 1984 (age 42)
- Place of birth: Chiba, Chiba, Japan
- Height: 1.77 m (5 ft 10 in)
- Positions: Defender; midfielder

Youth career
- 1999–2001: Yachiyo High School

Senior career*
Years	Team	Apps	(Gls)
2002–2007	FC Tokyo	100	(13)
2008–2009	Vissel Kobe	30	(2)
2009–2010	Angers	8	(0)
2010–2013	Omiya Ardija	31	(2)
2014	Vegalta Sendai	10	(0)
2015	Global		
Total		179	(17)

International career
2002–2003	Japan U-20	6	(0)
Medal record
FC Tokyo
Winner	J.League Cup	2004
- * Club domestic league appearances and goals

Norio Suzuki (鈴木 規郎, Suzuki Norio; born February 14, 1984) is a Japanese former professional footballer who played as a defender and midfielder.

== Club career ==
Suzuki was born in Chiba on February 14, 1984. After graduating from high school, he joined FC Tokyo in 2002. He debuted in 2003. He played many matches as left side midfielder. In 2008, he moved to Vissel Kobe. However his opportunity to play decreased in 2009 and he moved to Ligue 2 club Angers in June 2009. In July 2010, he returned to Japan and signed with Omiya Ardija. He played as regular player as left side back in 2010 season. However he could hardly play in the match behind Kim Young-gwon and Takumi Shimohira from 2011. He moved to Vegalta Sendai in 2014. However he could not play in many matches. He moved to Philippines club Global. He retired end of 2015 season.

== International career ==
In November 2003, Suzuki was selected Japan U-20 national team for 2003 World Youth Championship. At this tournament, he played 4 matches as left side midfielder.

== Career statistics ==
=== Club ===
Appearances and goals by club, season and competition
Club	Season	League			National cup (Note: Includes Emperor's Cup, Coupe de France and the PFF National Men's Club Championship)		League cup (Note: Includes League Cup, Coupe de la Ligue and the United Football League Cup.)		Continental (Note: Includes ACL.)		Total	
Club	Season	Division	Apps	Goals	Apps	Goals	Apps	Goals	Apps	Goals	Apps	Goals
FC Tokyo	2002	J1 League	3	0	1	1	0	0	–		4	1
FC Tokyo	2003	J1 League	8	0	1	0	4	0	–		13	0
FC Tokyo	2004	J1 League	14	4	1	0	4	1	–		19	5
FC Tokyo	2005	J1 League	24	3	2	1	2	0	–		28	4
FC Tokyo	2006	J1 League	21	1	1	2	5	0	–		27	3
FC Tokyo	2007	J1 League	30	5	3	0	7	1	–		40	6
FC Tokyo	Total		100	13	9	4	21	2	0	0	130	19
Vissel Kobe	2008	J1 League	26	2	2	0	5	0	–		33	2
Vissel Kobe	2009	J1 League	4	0	0	0	2	0	–		6	0
Vissel Kobe	Total		30	2	2	0	7	0	0	0	39	2
Angers	2009–10	Ligue 2	8	0	0	0	0	0	–		8	0
Omiya Ardija	2010	J1 League	19	1	0	0	0	0	–		19	1
Omiya Ardija	2011	J1 League	1	0	0	0	1	0	–		2	0
Omiya Ardija	2012	J1 League	1	0	0	0	3	0	–		4	0
Omiya Ardija	2013	J1 League	10	1	1	0	2	0	–		13	1
Omiya Ardija	Total		31	2	1	0	6	0	0	0	38	2
Vegalta Sendai	2014	J1 League	10	0	0	0	4	0	–		14	0
Global	2015	UFL Division 1	0	0	0	0	0	0	–		0	0
Career total			179	17	13	4	38	2	0	0	230	23

=== International ===
Team	Competition	Category	Appearances		Goals	Team record
Team	Competition	Category	Start	Sub	Goals	Team record
Japan	AFC Youth Championship 2002 Qualification	U-19	0	2	0	Qualified
Japan	2003 FIFA World Youth Championship	U-20	4	0	0	Quarterfinals
