= J.Youth Cup =

- Founded: 1994
- Region: Japan
- Teams: 64
- Current champions: Nagoya Grampus (2nd title)
- Most championships: Gamba Osaka (4 titles)
- 2024 J.Youth Cup

The J.Youth Cup (Jユースカップ, Jei yūsu kappu) is an annual nationwide association football tournament for youth clubs in Japan. It is restricted to members of J.League Academies and of the Japan Club Youth Football Federation (JCY).

The tournament started on 1993. Some J.League (and JFL in a smaller amount) club academies did not participate in the tournament as their youth teams were not well developed. As youth teams continued to show progress and development, it led to all clubs that were J.League members on 2012 having their youth team participating on it.

During the pandemic, the J.Youth Cup was not officially held. From 2021 to 2023, the J.Youth Cup became the J.Youth League, with the teams split into different groups. However, at each competition there were no official champions or even a knockout stage. On 2024, the tournament was reintroduced as the J.Youth Cup, being played in a cup format, with group and knockout stage, featuring all 60 J.League clubs' youth teams and 4 other nominated JCY-affiliated teams.

== Finals ==
| Season | Winner | Score | Runners–up |
|---|---|---|---|
| 1993 | Tokyo Verdy | 1–0 | Yokohama F. Marinos |
| 1994 | Gamba Osaka | 3–2 | Tokyo Verdy |
| 1995 | Sanfrecce Hiroshima | 3–1 | Tokyo Verdy |
| 1996 | Tokyo Verdy | 2–1 | Gamba Osaka |
| 1997 | Shimizu S-Pulse | 3–0 | Sanfrecce Hiroshima |
| 1998 | Kashima Antlers | 3–2 | JEF United Ichihara |
| 1999 | Vissel Kobe | 2–0 | Yokohama F. Marinos |
| 2000 | Gamba Osaka | 1–0 | Shimizu S-Pulse |
| 2001 | Kyoto Sanga | 3–1 | FC Tokyo |
| 2002 | Gamba Osaka | 5–0 | Sanfrecce Hiroshima |
| 2003 | Sanfrecce Hiroshima | 6–4 | JEF United Ichihara |
| 2004 | Kashima Antlers | 0–0 (3–1 p.) | Sanfrecce Hiroshima |
| 2005 | Shimizu S-Pulse | 4–1 | Vissel Kobe |
| 2006 | Sanfrecce Hiroshima | 2–0 | FC Tokyo |
| 2007 | FC Tokyo | 2–1 | Kashiwa Reysol |
| 2008 | Gamba Osaka | 4–2 | Cerezo Osaka |
| 2009 | FC Tokyo | 2–0 | Sanfrecce Hiroshima |
| 2010 | Yokohama F. Marinos | 4–3 (aet.) | FC Tokyo |
| 2011 | Nagoya Grampus | 2–1 | Cerezo Osaka |
| 2012 | Consadole Sapporo | 5–1 | Gamba Osaka |
| 2013 | Vissel Kobe | 2–2 (6–5 p.) | Sanfrecce Hiroshima |
| 2014 | Kashima Antlers | 1–1 (4–3 p.) | Gamba Osaka |
| 2015 | Urawa Red Diamonds | 2–1 | Nagoya Grampus |
| 2016 | FC Tokyo | 3–2 | Sanfrecce Hiroshima |
| 2017 | Kyoto Sanga | 2–1 | Gamba Osaka |
| 2018 | Yokohama F. Marinos | 2–1 | Shimizu S-Pulse |
| 2019 | Nagoya Grampus | 4–0 | Gamba Osaka |
| 2020 | Not held | | |
| 2021 | Not held | | |
| 2022 | Not held | | |
| 2024 | Tokyo Verdy | | Sanfrecce Hiroshima |
| 2025 | | | |

=== Most successful clubs ===
| P. | Team | Champions | Runners-up | Winning years |
|---|---|---|---|---|
| 1 | Gamba Osaka | 4 | 5 | 1994, 2000, 2002, 2008 |
| 2 | Sanfrecce Hiroshima | 3 | 7 | 1995, 2003, 2006 |
| 2 | FC Tokyo | 3 | 3 | 2007, 2009, 2016 |
| 2 | Kashima Antlers | 3 | 0 | 1998, 2004, 2014 |
| 5 | Tokyo Verdy | 3 | 2 | 1993, 1996, 2024 |
| 5 | Shimizu S-Pulse | 2 | 2 | 1997, 2005 |
| 5 | Yokohama F. Marinos | 2 | 2 | 2010, 2018 |
| 5 | Vissel Kobe | 2 | 1 | 1999, 2013 |
| 5 | Nagoya Grampus | 2 | 1 | 2011, 2019 |
| 5 | Kyoto Sanga | 2 | 0 | 2001, 2017 |
| 11 | Consadole Sapporo | 1 | 0 | 2012 |
| 11 | Urawa Red Diamonds | 1 | 0 | 2015 |
| 13 | JEF United Chiba | 0 | 2 | |
| 13 | Cerezo Osaka | 0 | 2 | |
| 13 | Kashiwa Reysol | 0 | 1 | |

== Individual awards ==
| Year | Top Scorer | Goals |
|---|---|---|
| 2001 | Satoru Yamagishi (JEF United Ichihara) | 15 |
| 2003 | Shunsuke Maeda (Sanfrecce Hiroshima) | 9 |
| 2004 | Yusuke Kawabuchi (JEF United Ichihara) | 13 |
| 2005 | Shun Nagasawa (Shimizu S-Pulse) | 16 |
| 2006 | Shota Tanaka (Kawasaki Frontale) | 9 |
| 2007 | Daisuke Watabe (Omiya Ardija) | 13 |
| 2008 | Ryota Iwabuchi (FC Tokyo) | 19 |
| 2009 | Hisao Mita (FC Tokyo) | 21 |
| 2010 | Katsuya Akioka (FC Tokyo); Sho Matsumoto (Yokohama F. Marinos) | 13 |
| 2011 | Takumi Minamino (Cerezo Osaka) | 13 |
| 2012 | Shuhei Yoshikawa (Kashiwa Reysol); Yusuke Uchida (Vissel Kobe); Hiroki Suehiro (Sanfrecce Hiroshima); Masashi Otani (Sanfrecce Hiroshima) | 8 |
| 2013 | Seiya Nakano (Júbilo Iwata) | 12 |
| 2014 | Masashi Wada (Yokohama F. Marinos) | 12 |
| 2015 | Kota Mori (Nagoya Grampus); Shumpei Fukahori (Nagoya Grampus) | 5 |
| 2016 | Towa Yamane (Sanfrecce Hiroshima) | 9 |
| 2017 | Shiryu Fujiwara (Tokushima Vortis) | 5 |
| 2018 | Shusuke Kurihara (Yokohama F. Marinos) | 8 |
| 2019 | Yukito Murakami (Nagoya Grampus) | 7 |
