= Felipe Silva (footballer) =

Brazilian footballer (born 1990)

Personal information
- Full name: Felipe de Oliveira Silva
- Date of birth: 28 May 1990 (age 36)
- Place of birth: Piracicaba, Brazil
- Height: 1.71 m (5 ft 7 in)
- Position: Attacking midfielder

Team information
- Current team: Inter de Limeira

Youth career
- 2007–2008: Rio Branco-SP
- 2008–2009: Palmeiras

Senior career*
Years	Team	Apps	(Gls)
2009	Palmeiras B	17	(14)
2009–2012	Palmeiras	6	(0)
2010	→ Rio Branco-SP (loan)	13	(1)
2010	→ Bahia (loan)	2	(0)
2011	→ Olaria (loan)	18	(7)
2011	→ Guarani (loan)	29	(8)
2012	→ Mogi Mirim (loan)	20	(8)
2012–2016	Atlético Paranaense	49	(5)
2014	→ Figueirense (loan)	14	(0)
2015	→ Ponte Preta (loan)	5	(0)
2016	→ Ceará (loan)	33	(5)
2017–2018	Sanfrecce Hiroshima	25	(2)
2019–2021	Ceará	51	(6)
2021	Chapecoense	10	(0)
2022–	Inter de Limeira	5	(1)
- * Club domestic league appearances and goals as of 8 February 2022

Felipe de Oliveira Silva (born 28 May 1990), known as Felipe Silva or simply Felipe, is a Brazilian footballer who plays as an attacking midfielder for Inter de Limeira.

== Career statistics ==
As of 25 October 2021

Club	Season	League			State League		Cup		Continental		Other		Total	
Club	Season	Division	Apps	Goals	Apps	Goals	Apps	Goals	Apps	Goals	Apps	Goals	Apps	Goals
Palmeiras B	2009	Paulista A3	—		17	14	—		—		—		17	14
Palmeiras	2009	Série A	1	0	—		0	0	—		—		1	0
Palmeiras	2012	Série A	5	0	—		0	0	—		—		5	0
Palmeiras	Total		6	0	—		0	0	—		—		6	0
Rio Branco-SP (loan)	2010	Paulista	—		13	1	—		—		—		13	1
Bahia (loan)	2010	Série B	2	0	—		—		—		—		2	0
Olaria (loan)	2011	Carioca	—		18	7	—		—		—		18	7
Guarani (loan)	2011	Série B	29	8	—		—		—		—		29	8
Mogi Mirim (loan)	2012	Série D	0	0	20	8	—		—		—		20	8
Atlético Paranaense	2012	Série B	18	0	—		—		—		—		18	0
Atlético Paranaense	2013	Série A	16	2	—		5	1	—		—		21	3
Atlético Paranaense	2014	Série A	3	0	—		—		3 (Note: Appearance(s) in Copa Libertadores)	1	—		6	1
Atlético Paranaense	2015	Série A	6	1	6	2	4	1	—		—		16	4
Atlético Paranaense	Total		43	3	6	2	9	2	3	1	—		61	8
Figueirense (loan)	2014	Série A	14	0	—		—		—		—		14	0
Ponte Preta (loan)	2015	Série A	5	0	—		—		2 (Note: Appearance(s) in Copa Sudamericana)	0	—		7	0
Ceará (loan)	2016	Série B	33	5	—		—		—		1 (Note: Appearance(s) in Copa do Nordeste)	0	34	5
Sanfrecce Hiroshima	2017	J1 League	23	2	—		3	2	—		7 (Note: Appearance(s) in J. League Cup)	1	33	5
Sanfrecce Hiroshima	2018	J1 League	2	0	—		1	0	—		6	1	9	1
Sanfrecce Hiroshima	Total		25	2	—		4	2	—		13	2	42	6
Ceará	2019	Série A	24	1	7	1	4	0	—		7	3	42	5
Ceará	2020	Série A	7	0	8	1	5	0	—		6	2	26	3
Ceará	2021	Série A	0	0	5	3	0	0	0	0	1	0	6	3
Ceará	Total		31	1	20	5	9	0	0	0	14	5	74	11
Chapecoense	2021	Série A	10	0	—		—		—		—		10	0
Career total			198	19	94	37	22	4	5	1	28	7	347	68
