= 2024 J.Youth Cup =

Tournament details
- Country: Japan
- Dates: 23 March 2024 – 17 December 2024
- Teams: 64

Final positions
- Champions: Tokyo Verdy Youth
- Runners-up: Sanfrecce Hiroshima F.C. Youth
- Third place: Kawasaki Frontale U-18 / JEF United Chiba U-18

Tournament statistics
- Top goal scorer: Shimon Kobayashi (Hiroshima) (10 goals

Official website
- https://www.jleague.jp/jyouth/2025/history/
- All statistics correct as of 19 March 2024.

The 2024 J.Youth Cup (Japanese: 2024Jユースカップ) is the 30th edition of the contested tournament for Japan youth clubs affiliated with both J.League and Japan Club Youth Football Federation. It marked the end of the four-year break motivated by the COVID-19 outbreak between the current and the last edition of the tournament, which was last held on 2019.

== Outline ==
All 60 J.League clubs' youth academies and 4 JCY youth clubs participates in the tournament.

For each match, 18 players (16 outfield players and 2 goalkeepers) can be selected. Similarly to the Olympic Games, the tournament uses an overage-players rule, with third-grade high schoolers having its participation restricted. About the first graders, only 3 outfield players and a goalkeeper can be selected to play each match. The main reason for the rule is that, according to the J.League, the tournament mainly targets under-15 to under-17 players.

The tournament consists of three rounds.

- In the first round, the teams are split in 16 groups with 4 teams each.
- In the second round, the teams are divided by performance. The two best-placed teams in each group joins the upper league, while the two worst-placed teams joins the lower league. Both leagues have its teams split into 8 groups of 4 teams each.
- Each upper league group winner qualifies for the knockout stage, which starts in the quarter-finals. Its pairings will be determined by a draw, held after the completion of the second round.

== Calendar ==
Round	Date
1st round	23 March–9 June 2024
2nd round	15 June–27 October 2024
Quarter-finals	3–4 November 2024
Semi-finals	9 November 2024
Final	17 November 2024

== Venues ==
Round	Venue	Location
1st round	Various; Home teams' stadiums	
2nd round	Various; Home teams' stadiums	
Quarter-finals	J-Village Stadium	Iwaki, Fukushima
Semi-finals	AGF Field	Chofu, Tokyo
Final	Yodoko Sakura Stadium	Osaka, Osaka

== First round ==
=== Group A ===
Pos	Team	Pld	W	D	L	GF	GA	GD	Pts	Qualification or relegation
1	Vegalta Sendai	1	1	0	0	11	0	+11	3	Upper League qualification
2	Blaublitz Akita	1	1	0	0	2	1	+1	3	Upper League qualification
3	Vanraure Hachinohe	1	0	0	1	1	2	−1	0	Lower League qualification
4	Iwate Grulla Morioka	1	0	0	1	0	11	−11	0	Lower League qualification

Updated to match(es) played on 24 March 2024. Source:
Rules for classification: 1) Points; 2) Goal difference; 3) Number of goals scored; 4) Head-to-head performance; 5) Accumulated playing time of under-15 players; 6) Draw (random selection)

=== Group B ===
Pos	Team	Pld	W	D	L	GF	GA	GD	Pts	Qualification or relegation
1	Montedio Yamagata	0	0	0	0	0	0	0	0	Upper League qualification
2	Fukushima United	0	0	0	0	0	0	0	0	Upper League qualification
3	Iwaki FC	0	0	0	0	0	0	0	0	Lower League qualification
4	Albirex Niigata	0	0	0	0	0	0	0	0	Lower League qualification

First match(es) will be played: 21 April 2024. Source:
Rules for classification: 1) Points; 2) Goal difference; 3) Number of goals scored; 4) Head-to-head performance; 5) Accumulated playing time of under-15 players; 6) Draw (random selection)

=== Group C ===
Pos	Team	Pld	W	D	L	GF	GA	GD	Pts	Qualification or relegation
1	Tokyo Verdy	1	1	0	0	9	1	+8	3	Upper League qualification
2	Briobecca Urayasu	1	1	0	0	5	0	+5	3	Upper League qualification
3	Kashiwa Reysol	1	0	0	1	0	5	−5	0	Lower League qualification
4	Tochigi SC	1	0	0	1	1	9	−8	0	Lower League qualification

Updated to match(es) played on 24 March 2024. Source:
Rules for classification: 1) Points; 2) Goal difference; 3) Number of goals scored; 4) Head-to-head performance; 5) Accumulated playing time of under-15 players; 6) Draw (random selection)

=== Group D ===
Pos	Team	Pld	W	D	L	GF	GA	GD	Pts	Qualification or relegation
1	Urawa Red Diamonds	1	1	0	0	5	1	+4	3	Upper League qualification
2	Machida Zelvia	1	1	0	0	4	2	+2	3	Upper League qualification
3	Yokohama FC	1	0	0	1	2	4	−2	0	Lower League qualification
4	FC Ryukyu	1	0	0	1	1	5	−4	0	Lower League qualification

Updated to match(es) played on 24 March 2024. Source:
Rules for classification: 1) Points; 2) Goal difference; 3) Number of goals scored; 4) Head-to-head performance; 5) Accumulated playing time of under-15 players; 6) Draw (random selection)

=== Group E ===
Pos	Team	Pld	W	D	L	GF	GA	GD	Pts	Qualification or relegation
1	JEF United Chiba	1	1	0	0	7	0	+7	3	Upper League qualification
2	Hokkaido Consadole Sapporo	0	0	0	0	0	0	0	0	Upper League qualification
3	Thespa Gunma	0	0	0	0	0	0	0	0	Lower League qualification
4	Ventforet Kofu	1	0	0	1	0	7	−7	0	Lower League qualification

Updated to match(es) played on 24 March 2024. Source:
Rules for classification: 1) Points; 2) Goal difference; 3) Number of goals scored; 4) Head-to-head performance; 5) Accumulated playing time of under-15 players; 6) Draw (random selection)

=== Group F ===
Pos	Team	Pld	W	D	L	GF	GA	GD	Pts	Qualification or relegation
1	FC Tokyo	1	1	0	0	13	2	+11	3	Upper League qualification
2	Mito HollyHock	1	1	0	0	5	1	+4	3	Upper League qualification
3	Mitsubishi Yowa	1	0	0	1	1	5	−4	0	Lower League qualification
4	YSCC Yokohama	1	0	0	1	2	13	−11	0	Lower League qualification

Updated to match(es) played on 24 March 2024. Source:
Rules for classification: 1) Points; 2) Goal difference; 3) Number of goals scored; 4) Head-to-head performance; 5) Accumulated playing time of under-15 players; 6) Draw (random selection)

=== Group G ===
Pos	Team	Pld	W	D	L	GF	GA	GD	Pts	Qualification or relegation
1	Kawasaki Frontale	1	1	0	0	10	0	+10	3	Upper League qualification
2	Yokohama F. Marinos	1	1	0	0	2	1	+1	3	Upper League qualification
3	Shonan Bellmare	1	0	0	1	1	2	−1	0	Lower League qualification
4	SC Sagamihara	1	0	0	1	0	10	−10	0	Lower League qualification

Updated to match(es) played on 24 March 2024. Source:
Rules for classification: 1) Points; 2) Goal difference; 3) Number of goals scored; 4) Head-to-head performance; 5) Accumulated playing time of under-15 players; 6) Draw (random selection)

=== Group H ===
Pos	Team	Pld	W	D	L	GF	GA	GD	Pts	Qualification or relegation
1	Azul Claro Numazu	1	1	0	0	3	1	+2	3	Upper League qualification
2	Omiya Ardija	1	0	1	0	0	0	0	1	Upper League qualification
3	Tokyu S Reyes	1	0	1	0	0	0	0	1	Lower League qualification
4	Kashima Antlers	1	0	0	1	1	3	−2	0	Lower League qualification

Updated to match(es) played on 24 March 2024. Source:
Rules for classification: 1) Points; 2) Goal difference; 3) Number of goals scored; 4) Head-to-head performance; 5) Accumulated playing time of under-15 players; 6) Draw (random selection)

=== Group I ===
Pos	Team	Pld	W	D	L	GF	GA	GD	Pts	Qualification or relegation
1	Nagano Parceiro	1	1	0	0	4	2	+2	3	Upper League qualification
2	Kataller Toyama	1	1	0	0	1	0	+1	3	Upper League qualification
3	Matsumoto Yamaga	1	0	0	1	0	1	−1	0	Lower League qualification
4	Zweigen Kanazawa	1	0	0	1	2	4	−2	0	Lower League qualification

Updated to match(es) played on 24 March 2024. Source:
Rules for classification: 1) Points; 2) Goal difference; 3) Number of goals scored; 4) Head-to-head performance; 5) Accumulated playing time of under-15 players; 6) Draw (random selection)

=== Group J ===
Pos	Team	Pld	W	D	L	GF	GA	GD	Pts	Qualification or relegation
1	Júbilo Iwata	1	1	0	0	2	1	+1	3	Upper League qualification
2	Shimizu S-Pulse	0	0	0	0	0	0	0	0	Upper League qualification
3	FC Gifu	0	0	0	0	0	0	0	0	Lower League qualification
4	Fujieda MYFC	1	0	0	1	1	2	−1	0	Lower League qualification

Updated to match(es) played on 24 March 2024. Source:
Rules for classification: 1) Points; 2) Goal difference; 3) Number of goals scored; 4) Head-to-head performance; 5) Accumulated playing time of under-15 players; 6) Draw (random selection)

=== Group K ===
Pos	Team	Pld	W	D	L	GF	GA	GD	Pts	Qualification or relegation
1	Nagoya Grampus	0	0	0	0	0	0	0	0	Upper League qualification
2	Gamba Osaka	0	0	0	0	0	0	0	0	Upper League qualification
3	Cerezo Osaka	0	0	0	0	0	0	0	0	Lower League qualification
4	FC Osaka	0	0	0	0	0	0	0	0	Lower League qualification

First match(es) will be played: 4 May 2024. Source:
Rules for classification: 1) Points; 2) Goal difference; 3) Number of goals scored; 4) Head-to-head performance; 5) Accumulated playing time of under-15 players; 6) Draw (random selection)

=== Group L ===
Pos	Team	Pld	W	D	L	GF	GA	GD	Pts	Qualification or relegation
1	Kyoto Sanga	1	1	0	0	4	1	+3	3	Upper League qualification
2	Vissel Kobe	0	0	0	0	0	0	0	0	Upper League qualification
3	Estrella Himeji	0	0	0	0	0	0	0	0	Lower League qualification
4	Nara Club	1	0	0	1	1	4	−3	0	Lower League qualification

Updated to match(es) played on 24 March 2024. Source:
Rules for classification: 1) Points; 2) Goal difference; 3) Number of goals scored; 4) Head-to-head performance; 5) Accumulated playing time of under-15 players; 6) Draw (random selection)

=== Group M ===
Pos	Team	Pld	W	D	L	GF	GA	GD	Pts	Qualification or relegation
1	Tokushima Vortis	1	1	0	0	2	0	+2	3	Upper League qualification
2	Gainare Tottori	0	0	0	0	0	0	0	0	Upper League qualification
3	Fagiano Okayama	0	0	0	0	0	0	0	0	Lower League qualification
4	Kamatamare Sanuki	1	0	0	1	0	2	−2	0	Lower League qualification

Updated to match(es) played on 24 March 2024. Source:
Rules for classification: 1) Points; 2) Goal difference; 3) Number of goals scored; 4) Head-to-head performance; 5) Accumulated playing time of under-15 players; 6) Draw (random selection)

=== Group N ===
Pos	Team	Pld	W	D	L	GF	GA	GD	Pts	Qualification or relegation
1	Sanfrecce Hiroshima	0	0	0	0	0	0	0	0	Upper League qualification
2	Renofa Yamaguchi	0	0	0	0	0	0	0	0	Upper League qualification
3	Ehime FC	0	0	0	0	0	0	0	0	Lower League qualification
4	FC Imabari	0	0	0	0	0	0	0	0	Lower League qualification

First match(es) will be played: 21 April 2024. Source:
Rules for classification: 1) Points; 2) Goal difference; 3) Number of goals scored; 4) Head-to-head performance; 5) Accumulated playing time of under-15 players; 6) Draw (random selection)

=== Group O ===
Pos	Team	Pld	W	D	L	GF	GA	GD	Pts	Qualification or relegation
1	Avispa Fukuoka	1	1	0	0	1	0	+1	3	Upper League qualification
2	Roasso Kumamoto	0	0	0	0	0	0	0	0	Upper League qualification
3	Oita Trinita	0	0	0	0	0	0	0	0	Lower League qualification
4	Kagoshima United	1	0	0	1	0	1	−1	0	Lower League qualification

Updated to match(es) played on 24 March 2024. Source:
Rules for classification: 1) Points; 2) Goal difference; 3) Number of goals scored; 4) Head-to-head performance; 5) Accumulated playing time of under-15 players; 6) Draw (random selection)

=== Group P ===
Pos	Team	Pld	W	D	L	GF	GA	GD	Pts	Qualification or relegation
1	Sagan Tosu	1	1	0	0	9	0	+9	3	Upper League qualification
2	Giravanz Kitakyushu	1	0	1	0	3	3	0	1	Upper League qualification
3	V-Varen Nagasaki	1	0	1	0	3	3	0	1	Lower League qualification
4	Tegevajaro Miyazaki	1	0	0	1	0	9	−9	0	Lower League qualification

Updated to match(es) played on 24 March 2024. Source:
Rules for classification: 1) Points; 2) Goal difference; 3) Number of goals scored; 4) Head-to-head performance; 5) Accumulated playing time of under-15 players; 6) Draw (random selection)
