= 2018 Sanfrecce Hiroshima season =

Sanfrecce Hiroshima
2018 season
- Owner: Mazda
- Chairman: Kaoru Koyano
- Manager: Hiroshi Jofuku
- Stadium: Hiroshima Big Arch
- Top goalscorer: League: All: Patric (10 goals)
- Biggest win: 4–0 (A) v. Gamba Osaka (J1 League Cup)
- Biggest defeat: 1–3 (A) v. FC Tokyo (J.League 10); 0–2 (H) v. Cerezo Osaka (J.League 15)
colours	colours
- All statistics correct as of 17 June 2018.

The 2018 Sanfrecce Hiroshima season was the club's tenth consecutive season in J1 League, and 48th overall incompeted Japanese top flight. Sanfrecce Hiroshima also competed in the Emperor's Cup, J.League Cup, and J.League Asia Challenge.

== J1 League ==
Pos	Team	Pld	W	D	L	GF	GA	GD	Pts	Qualification or relegation
1	Kawasaki Frontale (C)	34	21	6	7	57	27	+30	69	Qualification for the Champions League group stage
2	Sanfrecce Hiroshima	34	17	6	11	47	35	+12	57	Qualification for the Champions League play-off round
3	Kashima Antlers	34	16	8	10	50	39	+11	56	Qualification for the Champions League play-off round
4	Hokkaido Consadole Sapporo	34	15	10	9	48	48	0	55	
5	Urawa Red Diamonds	34	14	9	11	51	39	+12	51	Qualification for the Champions League group stage (Note: Urawa Red Diamonds qualified for the 2019 AFC Champions League group stage as 2018 Emperor's Cup winners.)

Source: Meiji Yasuda J1 League
Rules for classification: 1) Points; 2) Goal difference; 3) Goals scored
(C) Champions

=== Results summary ===
Overall								Home						Away					
Pld	W	D	L	GF	GA	GD	Pts	W	D	L	GF	GA	GD	W	D	L	GF	GA	GD
15	12	1	2	22	8	+14	37	5	1	1	9	3	+6	7	0	1	13	5	+8

Last updated: 20 May 2017.

=== Results by matchday ===
Matchday	1	2	3	4	5	6	7	8	9	10	11	12	13	14	15	16	17	18	19	20	21	22	23	24	25	26	27	28	29	30	31	32	33	34
Ground	H	A	A	H	A	A	H	A	H	A	A	H	H	A	H	H	A	H	A	H	H	A	H	A	H	A	H	A	H	A	A	H	H	A
Result	W	W	W	D	W	W	W	W	W	L	W	W	W	W	L																			
Position	4	2	1	2	1	1	1	1	1	1	1	1	1	1	1																			

Updated to match(es) played on 20 May 2018. Source:
A = Away; H = Home; W = Win; D = Draw; L = Loss

=== Matches ===
24 February 2018 J.League 1	Sanfrecce Hiroshima	1–0	Consadole Sapporo	Hiroshima
	Dangda 28'; Kawabe (yellow card) 69'; Aoyama (yellow card) 81'	Summary	Bothroyd (yellow card) 71'	Stadium: Edion Stadium Hiroshima; Attendance: 17,026; Referee: Yudai Yamamoto

4 March 2018 J.League 2	Urawa Red Diamonds	1–2	Sanfrecce Hiroshima	Saitama
	Antônio (yellow card) 15'; Aoki 43'; Abe (yellow card) 45+1'; Endo (yellow card) 70'		Kashiwa (yellow card) 17'; Shibasaki 66'; Inagaki 78'	Stadium: Saitama Stadium; Referee: Hiroyuki Kimura

10 March 2018 J.League 3	Kashima Antlers	0–1	Sanfrecce Hiroshima	Kashima
	Kanazaki (yellow card) 36'; Shoji (yellow card) 87'		Wada 51'; Sasaki (yellow card) 63'	Stadium: Kashima Soccer Stadium; Referee: Hajime Matsuo

18 March 2018 J.League 4	Sanfrecce Hiroshima	0–0	Júbilo Iwata	Hiroshima
	Nogami (yellow card) 38'; Inagaki (yellow card) 38'		Ominami (yellow card) 45+1'; Sakurauchi (yellow card) 79'	Stadium: Edion Stadium Hiroshima; Referee: Ryusuke Yamaoka
