= Kosuke Kikuchi =

Japanese footballer

Kosuke Kikuchi 菊地 光将
Personal information
- Full name: Kosuke Kikuchi
- Date of birth: December 16, 1985 (age 40)
- Place of birth: Koshigaya, Saitama, Japan
- Height: 1.83 m (6 ft 0 in)
- Position: Centre back

Team information
- Current team: Renofa Yamaguchi
- Number: 2

Youth career
- 2004–2007: Komazawa University

Senior career*
Years	Team	Apps	(Gls)
2008–2011	Kawasaki Frontale	93	(2)
2012–2019	Omiya Ardija	211	(13)
2020–	Renofa Yamaguchi	41	(1)
Medal record
Kawasaki Frontale
Runner-up	J1 League	2008
Runner-up	J1 League	2009
Runner-up	J.League Cup	2009
- * Club domestic league appearances and goals as of 00:58, 20 July 2022 (UTC)

Kosuke Kikuchi (菊地 光将, Kikuchi Kosuke; born December 16, 1985 in Koshigaya, Saitama) is a Japanese football player currently playing for Renofa Yamaguchi FC.

== Career statistics ==
Updated to 19 July 2022.

Club performance			League		Cup		League Cup		Continental		Other		Total	
Season	Club	League	Apps	Goals	Apps	Goals	Apps	Goals	Apps	Goals	Apps	Goals	Apps	Goals
Japan			League		Emperor's Cup		League Cup		AFC				Total	
2008	Kawasaki Frontale	J1 League	17	0	0	0	4	0	–		–		21	0
2009	Kawasaki Frontale	J1 League	22	1	2	0	4	0	5	0	–		33	1
2010	Kawasaki Frontale	J1 League	23	0	2	0	4	0	0	0	–		29	0
2011	Kawasaki Frontale	J1 League	31	1	2	0	3	0	–		–		36	1
2012	Omiya Ardija	J1 League	33	2	4	0	4	0	–		–		42	2
2013	Omiya Ardija	J1 League	34	2	1	0	4	0	–		–		39	2
2014	Omiya Ardija	J1 League	21	3	1	1	5	1	–		–		27	5
2015	Omiya Ardija	J2 League	29	1	2	0	–		–		–		31	1
2016	Omiya Ardija	J1 League	27	0	3	2	3	0	–		–		33	2
2017	Omiya Ardija	J1 League	22	2	2	0	0	0	–		–		24	2
2018	Omiya Ardija	J2 League	20	2	0	0	–		–		1 (Note: J1 league promotion playoffs)	0	21	2
2019	Omiya Ardija	J2 League	25	1	0	0	–		–		1 (Note: J1 league promotion playoffs)	0	26	1
2020	Renofa Yamaguchi	J2 League	19	1	–		–		–		–		19	1
2021	Renofa Yamaguchi	J2 League	16	0	0	0	–		–		–		16	0
2022	Renofa Yamaguchi	J2 League	6	0	1	0	–		–		–		7	0
Career total			345	16	20	3	31	1	5	0	2	0	403	20
