= Yuki Fukaya =

Japanese footballer

Personal information
- Date of birth: 1 August 1982 (age 44)
- Place of birth: Okazaki, Aichi, Japan
- Height: 1.80 m (5 ft 11 in)
- Position: Centre back

Youth career
- 2001–2004: Hannan University

Senior career*
Years	Team	Apps	(Gls)
2005–2009	Oita Trinita	140	(7)
2010–2012	Omiya Ardija	63	(7)
2013	Oita Trinita	4	(0)
2014–2015	FC Gifu	13	(0)
2016–2017	Ehime FC	20	(0)
Medal record
Oita Trinita
Winner	J.League Cup	2008
- * Club domestic league appearances and goals as of 2 February 2018

Yuki Fukaya (深谷 友基, Fukaya Yūki; born 1 August 1982 in Okazaki, Aichi) is a former Japanese footballer. He last played for Ehime F.C.

== Honors and awards ==
=== Oita Trinita ===
- J. League Cup (1) - 2008

== Career statistics ==
Updated to 2 February 2018.

Club performance			League		Cup		League Cup		Total	
Season	Club	League	Apps	Goals	Apps	Goals	Apps	Goals	Apps	Goals
Japan			League		Emperor's Cup		League Cup		Total	
2005	Oita Trinita	J1 League	32	1	2	0	5	0	39	1
2006	Oita Trinita	J1 League	31	1	2	0	5	1	38	2
2007	Oita Trinita	J1 League	31	3	2	0	5	0	38	3
2008	Oita Trinita	J1 League	32	1	0	0	9	0	41	1
2009	Oita Trinita	J1 League	14	1	2	0	3	0	19	1
2010	Omiya Ardija	J1 League	25	6	0	0	2	0	27	6
2011	Omiya Ardija	J1 League	27	1	1	0	2	0	30	1
2012	Omiya Ardija	J1 League	11	0	1	0	4	0	16	0
2013	Oita Trinita	J1 League	4	0	1	0	1	0	6	0
2014	FC Gifu	J2 League	3	0	0	0	-		3	0
2015	FC Gifu	J2 League	10	0	2	0	-		12	0
2016	Ehime FC	J2 League	11	0	3	0	-		14	0
2017	Ehime FC	J2 League	9	0	1	0	-		10	0
Career total			240	14	17	0	36	1	293	15
