= Daisuke Watabe =

Japanese footballer

Daisuke Watabe 渡部 大輔
Personal information
- Full name: Daisuke Watabe
- Date of birth: April 19, 1989 (age 37)
- Place of birth: Tokorozawa, Saitama, Japan
- Height: 1.70 m (5 ft 7 in)
- Position: Defender

Team information
- Current team: Omiya Ardija
- Number: 13

Youth career
- 2002–2007: Omiya Ardija

Senior career*
Years	Team	Apps	(Gls)
2008–	Omiya Ardija	166	(4)
- * Club domestic league appearances and goals as of 30 December 2018

Daisuke Watabe (渡部 大輔, Watabe Daisuke; born April 19, 1989 in Tokorozawa, Saitama) is a Japanese footballer who plays for Omiya Ardija in the J. League.

== Club career stats ==
Updated to 23 February 2018.

Club performance			League		Cup		League Cup		Total	
Season	Club	League	Apps	Goals	Apps	Goals	Apps	Goals	Apps	Goals
Japan			League		Emperor's Cup		J. League Cup		Total	
2008	Omiya Ardija	J1 League	0	0	0	0	0	0	0	0
2009	Omiya Ardija	J1 League	6	0	0	0	3	0	9	0
2010	Omiya Ardija	J1 League	16	0	1	0	6	0	23	0
2011	Omiya Ardija	J1 League	23	0	0	0	0	0	23	0
2012	Omiya Ardija	J1 League	25	2	3	0	3	0	31	2
2013	Omiya Ardija	J1 League	20	0	1	0	6	1	27	1
2014	Omiya Ardija	J1 League	9	0	1	0	3	0	13	0
2015	Omiya Ardija	J2 League	30	1	2	0	-		32	1
2016	Omiya Ardija	J1 League	9	0	3	0	4	0	16	0
2017	Omiya Ardija	J1 League	14	1	1	0	2	0	17	1
Career total			152	4	12	0	27	1	191	5

== Honours ==
- J2 League (1): 2015
