= Takuya Aoki =

Japanese footballer

Takuya Aoki 青木 拓矢
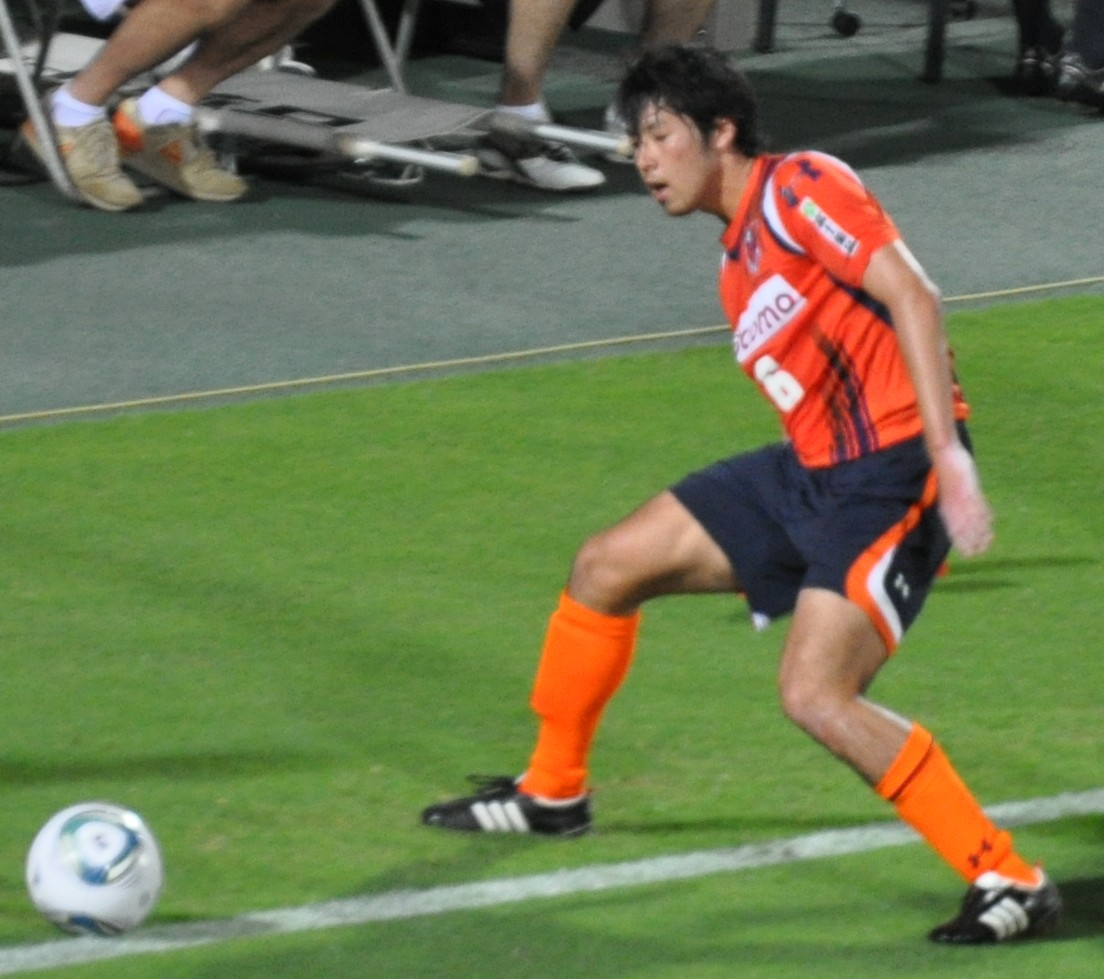
- Aoki playing with Omiya Ardija in 2011

Personal information
- Full name: Takuya Aoki
- Date of birth: 16 September 1989 (age 37)
- Place of birth: Takasaki, Gunma, Japan
- Height: 1.79 m (5 ft 10 in)
- Position: Defensive midfielder

Youth career
- 2005–2007: Maebashi Ikuei High School

Senior career*
Years	Team	Apps	(Gls)
2008–2013	Omiya Ardija	127	(11)
2014–2020	Urawa Red Diamonds	162	(3)
2021–2023	FC Tokyo	42	(0)
2024	FC Gifu	14	(0)
Medal record
Urawa Reds
Winner	AFC Champions League	2017
Runner-up	J1 League	2014
Runner-up	J1 League	2016
Winner	J.League Cup	2016
Winner	Emperor's Cup	2018
Runner-up	Emperor's Cup	2015
- * Club domestic league appearances and goals

Takuya Aoki (青木 拓矢, Aoki Takuya; born 16 September 1989) is a Japanese former professional footballer who played as a defensive midfielder.

== Career statistics ==
=== Club ===
Updated to 19 July 2022.

Club	Season	League			Emperor's Cup		J. League Cup		AFC		Other^{1}		Total	
Club	Season	Division	Apps	Goals	Apps	Goals	Apps	Goals	Apps	Goals	Apps	Goals	Apps	Goals
Omiya Ardija	2008	J1 League	1	0	0	0	1	0	–		–		2	0
Omiya Ardija	2009	J1 League	4	0	1	0	1	0	–		–		6	0
Omiya Ardija	2010	J1 League	26	0	2	0	6	0	–		–		34	0
Omiya Ardija	2011	J1 League	34	3	1	0	1	0	–		–		36	3
Omiya Ardija	2012	J1 League	34	4	4	0	4	1	–		–		42	5
Omiya Ardija	2013	J1 League	28	4	2	0	6	0	–		–		36	4
Omiya Ardija	Total		127	11	10	0	19	1	–		–		156	12
Urawa Red Diamonds	2014	J1 League	21	0	2	0	4	1	–		–		27	1
Urawa Red Diamonds	2015	J1 League	22	1	4	0	2	0	4	0	1	0	33	1
Urawa Red Diamonds	2016	J1 League	24	0	1	1	4	0	6	0	2	0	37	1
Urawa Red Diamonds	2017	J1 League	21	0	3	0	1	0	13	0	3	0	41	0
Urawa Red Diamonds	2018	J1 League	29	2	6	0	7	0	–		–		42	2
Urawa Red Diamonds	2019	J1 League	24	0	0	0	1	0	11	0	–		36	0
Urawa Red Diamonds	2020	J1 League	21	0	0	0	2	0	–		–		23	0
Urawa Red Diamonds	Total		162	3	16	1	21	1	34	0	6	0	239	5
FC Tokyo	2021	J1 League	32	0	0	0	10	0	–		–		42	0
FC Tokyo	2022	J1 League	18	0	1	0	3	0	–		–		22	0
FC Tokyo	Total		50	0	1	0	13	0	–		–		64	0
Total			339	14	27	1	53	2	34	0	6	0	459	17

^{1}Includes Japanese Super Cup, J. League Championship, FIFA Club World Cup.

== Honours ==
=== Club ===
Urawa Red Diamonds

- AFC Champions League: 2017
- J.League Cup: 2016
