= Carlinhos Paraíba =

Brazilian footballer (born 1983)

Personal information
- Full name: Carlos Pereira Berto Júnior
- Date of birth: 4 March 1983 (age 43)
- Place of birth: Joao Pessoa, Brazil
- Height: 1.70 m (5 ft 7 in)
- Positions: Central midfielder; left midfielder

Senior career*
Years	Team	Apps	(Gls)
2003–2007	Nacional-PB		
2007–2008	Santa Cruz		
2008–2009	Coritiba	64	(3)
2010–2012	São Paulo	47	(2)
2012–2015	Omiya Ardija	88	(6)
2013	→ Júbilo Iwata (loan)	11	(0)
2016–2017	Tokushima Vortis	49	(2)
2018	Santa Cruz	11	(2)
2019	Anapolina	5	(0)
- * Club domestic league appearances and goals

Carlos Pereira Berto Júnior (born 4 March 1983), or simply Carlinhos Paraíba, is a Brazilian former football midfielder.

== Career ==
In December 2009 São Paulo signed him from Coritiba. On July 6, 2012, he was selected member of the special charity match for 2011 Tōhoku earthquake and tsunami as J.League All Star.

== Honours ==
- Coritiba
  - Paraná State League: 2008

== Career statistics ==
Updated to 23 February 2018.

Club performance			League		Cup		Cup		Total	
Season	Club	League	Apps	Goals	Apps	Goals	Apps	Goals	Apps	Goals
Brazil			League		Copa do Brasil		Cup		Total	
2008	Coritiba	Série A	33	2	-	-	-	-	33	2
2009	Coritiba	Série A	31	1	6	0	-	-	37	1
2010	São Paulo	Série A	17	0	-	-	-	-	17	0
2011	São Paulo	Série A	30	2	7	0	-	-	37	2
Japan			League		J. League Cup		Emperor's Cup		Total	
2012	Omiya Ardija	J1 League	29	3	5	1	3	1	37	5
2013	Omiya Ardija	J1 League	3	0	1	0	-	-	4	0
2013	Júbilo Iwata	J1 League	11	0	-	-	2	0	13	0
2014	Omiya Ardija	J1 League	18	1	2	0	0	0	20	1
2015	Omiya Ardija	J2 League	38	2	0	0	-		38	2
2016	Tokushima Vortis	J2 League	24	2	1	0	-		25	2
2017	Tokushima Vortis	J2 League	25	0	1	0	-		26	0
Country	Brazil		111	5	13	0	-	-	124	5
Country	Japan		110	6	10	1	5	1	125	8
Total			221	11	23	1	5	1	249	13
