= Son Se-hwan =

South Korean footballer

Personal information
- Full name: Son Se-hwan
- Date of birth: July 29, 1995 (age 31)
- Place of birth: South Korea
- Height: 1.88 m (6 ft 2 in)
- Position: Defender

Senior career*
Years	Team	Apps	(Gls)
2014–2016	Tokushima Vortis	0	(0)
Total		0	(0)
- * Club domestic league appearances and goals

Son Se-hwan (born July 29, 1995) is a South Korean football player.

== Playing career ==
Son Se-hwan joined to Tokushima Vortis in 2014. On May 24, he debuted in J.League Cup (v Nagoya Grampus). In July 2016, he left the club.
