= 2017 Sagan Tosu season =

Sagan Tosu
2017 season
- Manager: Massimo Ficcadenti
- Stadium: Best Amenity Stadium
- J1 League: 8th

2017 Sagan Tosu season.

== J1 League ==
=== League table ===
Pos	Team	Pld	W	D	L	GF	GA	GD	Pts
6	Júbilo Iwata	34	16	10	8	50	30	+20	58
7	Urawa Red Diamonds	34	14	7	13	64	54	+10	49
8	Sagan Tosu	34	13	8	13	41	44	−3	47
9	Vissel Kobe	34	13	5	16	40	45	−5	44
10	Gamba Osaka	34	11	10	13	48	41	+7	43

Source: Meiji Yasuda J1 League
Rules for classification: 1) Points; 2) Goal difference; 3) Goals scored

=== Match details ===
J1 League match details
Match	Date	Team	Score	Team	Venue	Attendance
1	2017.02.25	Sagan Tosu	1-3	Kashiwa Reysol	Best Amenity Stadium	14,355
2	2017.03.05	Kawasaki Frontale	1-1	Sagan Tosu	Kawasaki Todoroki Stadium	22,705
3	2017.03.11	Sagan Tosu	1-0	Sanfrecce Hiroshima	Best Amenity Stadium	13,004
4	2017.03.18	Cerezo Osaka	1-0	Sagan Tosu	Kincho Stadium	13,086
5	2017.04.01	FC Tokyo	3-3	Sagan Tosu	Ajinomoto Stadium	19,669
6	2017.04.08	Sagan Tosu	3-0	Albirex Niigata	Best Amenity Stadium	8,990
7	2017.04.16	Júbilo Iwata	2-1	Sagan Tosu	Yamaha Stadium	11,910
8	2017.04.22	Sagan Tosu	1-0	Vissel Kobe	Best Amenity Stadium	11,088
9	2017.04.30	Kashima Antlers	2-1	Sagan Tosu	Kashima Soccer Stadium	18,462
10	2017.05.07	Sagan Tosu	1-0	Yokohama F. Marinos	Best Amenity Stadium	21,245
11	2017.05.14	Shimizu S-Pulse	1-1	Sagan Tosu	IAI Stadium Nihondaira	14,172
12	2017.05.20	Gamba Osaka	3-0	Sagan Tosu	Suita City Football Stadium	21,366
13	2017.05.27	Sagan Tosu	1-0	Hokkaido Consadole Sapporo	Best Amenity Stadium	14,416
14	2017.06.04	Omiya Ardija	1-1	Sagan Tosu	NACK5 Stadium Omiya	11,631
15	2017.06.17	Sagan Tosu	1-1	Vegalta Sendai	Best Amenity Stadium	10,265
16	2017.06.25	Sagan Tosu	2-1	Urawa Reds	Best Amenity Stadium	17,913
17	2017.07.02	Ventforet Kofu	0-0	Sagan Tosu	Yamanashi Chuo Bank Stadium	8,169
18	2017.07.08	Sagan Tosu	2-3	Kawasaki Frontale	Best Amenity Stadium	12,401
19	2017.07.30	Sanfrecce Hiroshima	0-1	Sagan Tosu	Edion Stadium Hiroshima	14,974
20	2017.08.05	Sagan Tosu	2-1	Shimizu S-Pulse	Best Amenity Stadium	9,628
21	2017.08.09	Kashiwa Reysol	0-0	Sagan Tosu	Hitachi Kashiwa Stadium	9,682
22	2017.08.13	Yokohama F. Marinos	1-0	Sagan Tosu	NHK Spring Mitsuzawa Football Stadium	12,764
23	2017.08.19	Sagan Tosu	3-0	Omiya Ardija	Best Amenity Stadium	14,816
24	2017.08.26	Sagan Tosu	1-3	Gamba Osaka	Best Amenity Stadium	16,474
25	2017.09.10	Vegalta Sendai	4-1	Sagan Tosu	Yurtec Stadium Sendai	12,652
26	2017.09.16	Sagan Tosu	2-1	Ventforet Kofu	Best Amenity Stadium	7,381
27	2017.09.23	Urawa Reds	2-2	Sagan Tosu	Saitama Stadium 2002	29,557
28	2017.09.30	Sagan Tosu	1-0	Kashima Antlers	Best Amenity Stadium	18,383
29	2017.10.15	Sagan Tosu	1-2	Cerezo Osaka	Best Amenity Stadium	14,896
30	2017.10.21	Vissel Kobe	1-2	Sagan Tosu	Noevir Stadium Kobe	17,016
31	2017.10.29	Albirex Niigata	1-0	Sagan Tosu	Denka Big Swan Stadium	17,426
32	2017.11.18	Sagan Tosu	2-1	FC Tokyo	Best Amenity Stadium	19,476
33	2017.11.26	Sagan Tosu	0-2	Júbilo Iwata	Best Amenity Stadium	16,564
34	2017.12.02	Hokkaido Consadole Sapporo	3-2	Sagan Tosu	Sapporo Dome	27,796
