= 2016 Omiya Ardija season =

Omiya Ardija
2016 season
- Manager: Hiroki Shibuya
- Stadium: NACK5 Stadium Omiya
- J1 League: 5th

2016 Omiya Ardija season.

== J1 League ==
=== League table ===
Pos	Team	Pld	W	D	L	GF	GA	GD	Pts	Qualification or relegation
3	Kashima Antlers (C)	34	18	5	11	53	34	+19	59	Club World Cup, Champions League group stage and J. League Championship 1st Round
4	Gamba Osaka	34	17	7	10	53	42	+11	58	Champions League play-off round (Note: The winner of the 2016 Emperor's Cup qualified for the Group Stage of the 2017 AFC Champions League. Since the Emperor's Cup winner Kashima Antlers had already qualified for the AFC Champions League, the play-off round spot was awarded to the fourth-placed team.)
5	Omiya Ardija	34	15	11	8	41	36	+5	56	
6	Sanfrecce Hiroshima	34	16	7	11	58	40	+18	55	
7	Vissel Kobe	34	16	7	11	56	43	+13	55	

Source: Meiji Yasuda J1 League
Rules for classification: 1) Points; 2) Goal difference; 3) Goals scored.
(C) Champions

=== Match details ===
Match	Date	Team	Score	Team	Venue	Attendance
1-1	2016.02.27	FC Tokyo	0-1	Omiya Ardija	Ajinomoto Stadium	25,776
1-2	2016.03.05	Omiya Ardija	2-0	Kashiwa Reysol	NACK5 Stadium Omiya	12,696
1-3	2016.03.11	Gamba Osaka	2-1	Omiya Ardija	Suita City Football Stadium	20,535
1-4	2016.03.20	Omiya Ardija	1-5	Sanfrecce Hiroshima	NACK5 Stadium Omiya	13,452
1-5	2016.04.02	Omiya Ardija	1-1	Júbilo Iwata	NACK5 Stadium Omiya	11,271
1-6	2016.04.10	Nagoya Grampus	1-2	Omiya Ardija	Toyota Stadium	12,417
1-7	2016.04.16	Omiya Ardija	1-1	Ventforet Kofu	NACK5 Stadium Omiya	9,659
1-8	2016.04.24	Shonan Bellmare	0-1	Omiya Ardija	Shonan BMW Stadium Hiratsuka	9,080
1-9	2016.04.30	Omiya Ardija	0-0	Kashima Antlers	NACK5 Stadium Omiya	12,594
1-10	2016.05.04	Avispa Fukuoka	1-2	Omiya Ardija	Level5 Stadium	12,418
1-11	2016.05.08	Omiya Ardija	0-1	Urawa Reds	NACK5 Stadium Omiya	13,880
1-12	2016.05.14	Vegalta Sendai	0-1	Omiya Ardija	Yurtec Stadium Sendai	12,892
1-13	2016.05.21	Sagan Tosu	0-1	Omiya Ardija	Best Amenity Stadium	7,729
1-14	2016.05.29	Omiya Ardija	2-2	Vissel Kobe	NACK5 Stadium Omiya	12,446
1-15	2016.06.11	Albirex Niigata	1-0	Omiya Ardija	Denka Big Swan Stadium	20,381
1-16	2016.06.18	Omiya Ardija	1-1	Yokohama F. Marinos	NACK5 Stadium Omiya	12,510
1-17	2016.06.25	Kawasaki Frontale	2-0	Omiya Ardija	Kawasaki Todoroki Stadium	26,612
2-1	2016.07.02	Omiya Ardija	1-0	Nagoya Grampus	NACK5 Stadium Omiya	10,742
2-2	2016.07.09	Júbilo Iwata	1-1	Omiya Ardija	Yamaha Stadium	10,416
2-3	2016.07.13	Omiya Ardija	0-0	Gamba Osaka	NACK5 Stadium Omiya	9,873
2-4	2016.07.17	Urawa Reds	2-2	Omiya Ardija	Saitama Stadium 2002	53,951
2-5	2016.07.23	Omiya Ardija	1-2	Albirex Niigata	NACK5 Stadium Omiya	12,048
2-6	2016.07.30	Vissel Kobe	1-0	Omiya Ardija	Noevir Stadium Kobe	11,212
2-7	2016.08.06	Omiya Ardija	1-0	Avispa Fukuoka	NACK5 Stadium Omiya	10,106
2-8	2016.08.13	Yokohama F. Marinos	1-1	Omiya Ardija	NHK Spring Mitsuzawa Football Stadium	13,009
2-9	2016.08.20	Omiya Ardija	2-1	Vegalta Sendai	NACK5 Stadium Omiya	9,480
2-10	2016.08.27	Ventforet Kofu	2-2	Omiya Ardija	Yamanashi Chuo Bank Stadium	7,960
2-11	2016.09.10	Sanfrecce Hiroshima	0-1	Omiya Ardija	Edion Stadium Hiroshima	13,644
2-12	2016.09.17	Omiya Ardija	3-2	Kawasaki Frontale	Kumagaya Athletic Stadium	13,787
2-13	2016.09.25	Omiya Ardija	1-1	Sagan Tosu	NACK5 Stadium Omiya	11,807
2-14	2016.10.01	Kashima Antlers	1-3	Omiya Ardija	Kashima Soccer Stadium	20,086
2-15	2016.10.22	Omiya Ardija	3-2	Shonan Bellmare	NACK5 Stadium Omiya	12,106
2-16	2016.10.29	Kashiwa Reysol	1-2	Omiya Ardija	Hitachi Kashiwa Stadium	11,583
2-17	2016.11.03	Omiya Ardija	0-1	FC Tokyo	NACK5 Stadium Omiya	12,377
