= 2017 Omiya Ardija season =

Omiya Ardija
2017 season
- Manager: Hiroki Shibuya; Akira Ito; Masatada Ishii
- Stadium: NACK5 Stadium Omiya
- J1 League: 18th

2017 Omiya Ardija season.

== J1 League ==
=== League table ===
Pos	Team	Pld	W	D	L	GF	GA	GD	Pts	Qualification or relegation
14	Shimizu S-Pulse	34	8	10	16	36	54	−18	34	
15	Sanfrecce Hiroshima	34	8	9	17	32	49	−17	33	
16	Ventforet Kofu (R)	34	7	11	16	23	39	−16	32	Relegation to 2018 J2 League
17	Albirex Niigata (R)	34	7	7	20	28	60	−32	28	Relegation to 2018 J2 League
18	Omiya Ardija (R)	34	5	10	19	28	60	−32	25	Relegation to 2018 J2 League

Source: Meiji Yasuda J1 League
Rules for classification: 1) Points; 2) Goal difference; 3) Goals scored
(R) Relegated

=== Match details ===
Match	Date	Team	Score	Team	Venue	Attendance
1	2017.02.25	Omiya Ardija	0-2	Kawasaki Frontale	NACK5 Stadium Omiya	11,962
2	2017.03.04	FC Tokyo	2-0	Omiya Ardija	Ajinomoto Stadium	27,259
3	2017.03.11	Omiya Ardija	1-2	Júbilo Iwata	NACK5 Stadium Omiya	11,943
4	2017.03.18	Ventforet Kofu	1-0	Omiya Ardija	Yamanashi Chuo Bank Stadium	10,079
5	2017.04.01	Omiya Ardija	0-1	Kashima Antlers	NACK5 Stadium Omiya	11,676
6	2017.04.08	Omiya Ardija	0-2	Vissel Kobe	NACK5 Stadium Omiya	9,598
7	2017.04.16	Shimizu S-Pulse	1-1	Omiya Ardija	IAI Stadium Nihondaira	16,277
8	2017.04.21	Gamba Osaka	6-0	Omiya Ardija	Suita City Football Stadium	13,074
9	2017.04.30	Omiya Ardija	1-0	Urawa Reds	NACK5 Stadium Omiya	12,401
10	2017.05.06	Hokkaido Consadole Sapporo	1-0	Omiya Ardija	Sapporo Dome	15,498
11	2017.05.14	Omiya Ardija	2-1	Vegalta Sendai	NACK5 Stadium Omiya	9,920
12	2017.05.20	Omiya Ardija	0-3	Cerezo Osaka	NACK5 Stadium Omiya	11,823
13	2017.05.27	Kashiwa Reysol	4-2	Omiya Ardija	Hitachi Kashiwa Stadium	10,807
14	2017.06.04	Omiya Ardija	1-1	Sagan Tosu	NACK5 Stadium Omiya	11,631
15	2017.06.17	Albirex Niigata	1-2	Omiya Ardija	Denka Big Swan Stadium	27,605
16	2017.06.25	Sanfrecce Hiroshima	0-3	Omiya Ardija	Edion Stadium Hiroshima	11,433
17	2017.07.01	Omiya Ardija	1-2	Yokohama F. Marinos	NACK5 Stadium Omiya	11,448
18	2017.07.08	Omiya Ardija	2-2	Hokkaido Consadole Sapporo	NACK5 Stadium Omiya	11,863
19	2017.07.29	Vissel Kobe	3-1	Omiya Ardija	Noevir Stadium Kobe	19,415
20	2017.08.05	Urawa Reds	2-2	Omiya Ardija	Saitama Stadium 2002	45,411
21	2017.08.09	Omiya Ardija	1-2	FC Tokyo	NACK5 Stadium Omiya	11,115
22	2017.08.13	Omiya Ardija	1-0	Albirex Niigata	NACK5 Stadium Omiya	10,900
23	2017.08.19	Sagan Tosu	3-0	Omiya Ardija	Best Amenity Stadium	14,816
24	2017.08.26	Omiya Ardija	1-1	Sanfrecce Hiroshima	NACK5 Stadium Omiya	11,511
25	2017.09.09	Kashima Antlers	1-0	Omiya Ardija	Kashima Soccer Stadium	15,719
26	2017.09.16	Omiya Ardija	2-2	Gamba Osaka	Kumagaya Athletic Stadium	13,364
27	2017.09.23	Júbilo Iwata	2-1	Omiya Ardija	Yamaha Stadium	13,119
28	2017.09.30	Omiya Ardija	0-0	Shimizu S-Pulse	NACK5 Stadium Omiya	11,545
29	2017.10.14	Yokohama F. Marinos	1-1	Omiya Ardija	Nissan Stadium	20,670
30	2017.10.21	Omiya Ardija	1-1	Kashiwa Reysol	NACK5 Stadium Omiya	9,752
31	2017.10.29	Cerezo Osaka	2-1	Omiya Ardija	Kincho Stadium	8,998
32	2017.11.18	Vegalta Sendai	3-0	Omiya Ardija	Yurtec Stadium Sendai	15,533
33	2017.11.26	Omiya Ardija	0-0	Ventforet Kofu	NACK5 Stadium Omiya	12,435
34	2017.12.02	Kawasaki Frontale	5-0	Omiya Ardija	Kawasaki Todoroki Stadium	25,904
