= 2014 J.League Division 1 =

22nd season of J1 League

J.League Division 1
- Season: 2014
- Champions: Gamba Osaka; 2nd J.League title 2nd Japanese title
- Relegated: Omiya Ardija; Cerezo Osaka; Tokushima Vortis
- Champions League: Gamba Osaka; Urawa Red Diamonds; Kashima Antlers
- Matches: 306
- Goals: 774 (2.53 per match)
- Top goalscorer: Yoshito Ōkubo (18 goals)
- Highest attendance: 56,758; Reds vs Gamba
- Lowest attendance: 0 Reds vs S-Pulse
- Average attendance: 17,240

The 2014 J.League Division 1 season was the 49th season of top-flight football in Japan, and the 22nd since the establishment of the J.League in 1992. The season began on 1 March and ended on 8 December. Sanfrecce Hiroshima were the defending champions.

Due to Japan's participation in the 2014 FIFA World Cup, there was an extended break to allow for preparation after the 14th-week matches on 17 and 18 May, with the league resuming on 15 July for four clubs who participated in the 2014 AFC Champions League to play rescheduled 12th-week matches, and 19 July for other 14 clubs.

This season saw the league played via a home and away system over a single season for the last time until at least 2020. From 2015, the league would revert to an Apertura and Clausura system, with a multi-team play-off 'super stage' to decide the champions, similar to the format used when the J.League began.

The league was won by Gamba Osaka, who won their second J.League title following a 0–0 away draw against Tokushima Vortis. They became the second league champions (after Kashiwa Reysol) to win the first division after being promoted as second division champions.

== Clubs ==
18 teams competed in this year's competition. Both Gamba Osaka and Vissel Kobe returned to J1 after a single season outside the top flight; they finished as the 2013 J.League Division 2 champions and runners-up, respectively. Tokushima Vortis, who finished fourth in the regular season and won the promotion playoff, will make their top-flight debut, becoming the first club from Shikoku to do so. Those three teams replaced Oita Trinita, Shonan Bellmare and Júbilo Iwata; Júbilo were relegated from J1 for the first time after twenty seasons in the top tier, while Bellmare and Trinita were bumped down after cameo appearances in J1.

Locations of the 2014 J.League 1 teams

Club name	Hometown(s)	Stadium	Capacity	Note(s)
Albirex Niigata	Niigata & Seirō, Niigata	Denka Big Swan Stadium	42,300	
Cerezo Osaka	Osaka	Nagai Stadium	47,816	2014 AFC Champions League participant (as 2013 J.League Division 1 fourth-place team)
FC Tokyo	Tokyo	Ajinomoto Stadium	49,970	
Gamba Osaka	Suita, Osaka	Expo '70 Commemorative Stadium	21,000	Promoted from J.League Division 2 in 2013 (as champions)
Kashima Antlers	Kashima, Ibaraki	Kashima Soccer Stadium	40,728	
Kashiwa Reysol	Kashiwa, Chiba	Kashiwa Soccer Stadium	15,900	
Kawasaki Frontale	Kawasaki, Kanagawa	Todoroki Athletics Stadium	26,232	2014 AFC Champions League participant (as 2013 J.League Division 1 third-place team)
Nagoya Grampus	Nagoya, Aichi	Paloma Mizuho Stadium	27,000	
Omiya Ardija	Ōmiya, Saitama	NACK5 Stadium	15,500	
Sagan Tosu	Tosu, Saga	Tosu Stadium	24,490	
Sanfrecce Hiroshima	Hiroshima	Hiroshima Big Arch	50,000	2014 AFC Champions League participant (as 2013 J.League Division 1 winners)
Shimizu S-Pulse	Shizuoka	IAI Stadium Nihondaira	20,339	
Tokushima Vortis	All cities/towns in Tokushima	Pocarisweat Stadium	20,441	Promoted from J.League Division 2 in 2013 (through a play-off system)
Urawa Red Diamonds	Urawa, Saitama	Saitama Stadium	63,700	
Vegalta Sendai	Sendai, Miyagi	Yurtec Stadium	19,694	
Ventforet Kofu	Kōfu, Yamanashi	Yamanashi Chuo Bank Stadium	17,000	
Vissel Kobe	Kobe, Hyōgo	Misaki Park Stadium	30,132	Promoted from J.League Division 2 in 2013 (as runners-up)
Yokohama F. Marinos	Yokohama, Kanagawa & Yokosuka, Kanagawa	Nissan Stadium	72,327	2014 AFC Champions League participant (as 2013 J.League Division 1 runners-up)

=== Personnel and kits ===
Club name	Head coach	Kit manufacturer	Front shirt sponsor
Albirex Niigata	(Japan) Masaaki Yanagishita	Adidas	Kameda Seika
Cerezo Osaka	(Japan) Yuji Okuma	Mizuno	Yanmar
FC Tokyo	(Italy) Massimo Ficcadenti	Adidas	Lifeval
Gamba Osaka	(Japan) Kenta Hasegawa	Umbro	Panasonic
Kashima Antlers	(Brazil) Toninho Cerezo	Nike	Lixil
Kashiwa Reysol	(Brazil) Nelsinho Baptista	Yonex	Hitachi
Kawasaki Frontale	(Japan) Yahiro Kazama	Puma	Fujitsu
Nagoya Grampus	(Japan) Akira Nishino	Le Coq Sportif	Toyota
Omiya Ardija	(Japan) Hiroki Shibuya	Under Armour	NTT Docomo
Sagan Tosu	(Japan) Megumu Yoshida	Warrior	DHC
Sanfrecce Hiroshima	(Japan) Hajime Moriyasu	Nike	EDION
Shimizu S-Pulse	(Japan) Katsumi Oenoki	Puma	Suzuyo
Tokushima Vortis	(Japan) Shinji Kobayashi	Mizuno	Pocari Sweat
Urawa Red Diamonds	(Serbia) Mihailo Petrović	Nike	Polus
Vegalta Sendai	(Japan) Susumu Watanabe	Asics	Iris Ohyama
Ventforet Kofu	(Japan) Hiroshi Jofuku	Mizuno	Hakubaku
Vissel Kobe	(Japan) Ryo Adachi	Asics	Rakuten
Yokohama F. Marinos	(Japan) Yasuhiro Higuchi	Adidas	Nissan

=== Managerial changes ===
Team	Outgoing manager	Manner of departure	Incoming manager
Vegalta Sendai	(Australia) Graham Arnold	Mutual consent	(Japan) Susumu Watanabe
Cerezo Osaka	(Serbia) Ranko Popović	Mutual consent	(Germany) Marco Pezzaiuoli
Shimizu S-Pulse	(Iran) Afshin Ghotbi	Mutual consent	(Japan) Katsumi Oenoki
Sagan Tosu	(South Korea) Yoon Jong-hwan	Sacked	(Japan) Megumu Yoshida
Omiya Ardija	(Japan) Kiyoshi Okuma	Sacked	(Japan) Hiroki Shibuya
Cerezo Osaka	(Germany) Marco Pezzaiuoli	Sacked	(Japan) Yuji Okuma

=== Foreign players ===
Club	Player 1	Player 2	Player 3	AFC player	Non-visa foreign	Type-C contract	Former player(s)
Albirex Niigata	(Brazil) Léo Silva	(Brazil) Rafael Silva	(South Korea) Lee Myung-jae	(South Korea) Song Ju-hun	(New Zealand) Michael Fitzgerald		(Brazil) Roger Gaúcho (South Korea) Kim Jin-su
Cerezo Osaka	(Germany) Cacau	(South Korea) Kim Jin-hyeon	(Uruguay) Diego Forlán	(South Korea) Kim Sung-joon		(South Korea) Gu Sung-yun	(Australia) Mitch Nichols (Serbia) Gojko Kačar
FC Tokyo	(Brazil) Edu	(Italy) Michele Canini					(Brazil) Matheus Ferraz (South Korea) Kwak Hee-ju
Gamba Osaka	(Brazil) Lins	(Brazil) Patric		(South Korea) Oh Jae-suk			(Brazil) Evson
Kashima Antlers	(Brazil) Davi	(Brazil) Jorge Wagner	(Brazil) Luís Alberto		(Brazil) Caio		(Brazil) Jair
Kashiwa Reysol	(Brazil) Dudu	(Brazil) Eduardo	(Brazil) Leandro	(South Korea) Kim Chang-soo		(New Zealand) Michael den Heijer	(Brazil) Leandro Domingues (South Korea) Han Kook-young
Kawasaki Frontale	(Brazil) Jeci	(Brazil) Paulinho	(Brazil) Renatinho		(North Korea) An Byong-jun		
Nagoya Grampus	(Brazil) Leandro Domingues	(Brazil) Régis	(Colombia) Danilson Córdoba	(Australia) Joshua Kennedy		(Brazil) Gustavo	
Omiya Ardija	(Brazil) Carlinhos Paraíba	(Serbia) Dragan Mrđa	(Slovenia) Zlatan Ljubijankić	(South Korea) Cho Won-hee		(Brazil) Mateus	(Montenegro) Dženan Radončić
Sagan Tosu	(South Korea) Choi Sung-keun	(South Korea) Kim Min-hyeok		(South Korea) Kim Min-woo			
Sanfrecce Hiroshima	(Croatia) Mihael Mikić	(South Korea) Byeon Jun-byum	(South Korea) Hwang Seok-ho	(South Korea) Park Hyung-jin			
Shimizu S-Pulse	(Canada) Dejan Jaković	(Netherlands) Calvin Jong-a-Pin	(Slovenia) Milivoje Novaković	(South Korea) Lee Ki-je	(Brazil) Bueno		
Tokushima Vortis	(Brazil) Adriano	(Brazil) Alex	(Colombia) Julián Estiven Vélez	(South Korea) Kim Jong-min	(North Korea) Ri Yong-jik	(South Korea) Son Se-hwan	(Brazil) Douglas (Brazil) Kleiton Domingues
Urawa Red Diamonds	(Brazil) Márcio Richardes						
Vegalta Sendai	(Brazil) Ramon Lopes	(Brazil) Wilson			(North Korea) Ryang Yong-gi (United States) Daniel Schmidt		(Australia) Danny Vukovic (New Zealand) Michael McGlinchey
Ventforet Kofu	(Brazil) Cristiano	(Brazil) Marquinhos Paraná	(Brazil) Thiago Quirino	(Indonesia) Irfan Bachdim			(Brazil) Gilsinho
Vissel Kobe	(Brazil) Fábio Simplício	(Brazil) Marquinhos	(Brazil) Pedro Júnior	(South Korea) Jung Woo-young			
Yokohama F. Marinos	(Brazil) Fábio	(Brazil) Rafinha					

== League table ==
Pos	Team	Pld	W	D	L	GF	GA	GD	Pts	Qualification or relegation
1	Gamba Osaka (C)	34	19	6	9	59	31	+28	63	Qualification for 2015 AFC Champions League group stage (Note: Because Gamba Osaka also won the 2014 Emperor's Cup, the group stage spot has been given to third-placed Kashima Antlers, while ACL qualification spot was awarded to the fourth-placed Kashiwa Reysol.)
2	Urawa Red Diamonds	34	18	8	8	52	32	+20	62	Qualification for 2015 AFC Champions League group stage
3	Kashima Antlers	34	18	6	10	64	39	+25	60	Qualification for 2015 AFC Champions League group stage
4	Kashiwa Reysol	34	17	9	8	48	40	+8	60	Qualification for 2015 AFC Champions League Third qualifying round
5	Sagan Tosu	34	19	3	12	41	33	+8	60	
6	Kawasaki Frontale	34	16	7	11	56	43	+13	55	
7	Yokohama F. Marinos	34	14	9	11	37	29	+8	51	
8	Sanfrecce Hiroshima	34	13	11	10	44	37	+7	50	
9	FC Tokyo	34	12	12	10	47	33	+14	48	
10	Nagoya Grampus	34	13	9	12	47	48	−1	48	
11	Vissel Kobe	34	11	12	11	49	50	−1	45	
12	Albirex Niigata	34	12	8	14	30	36	−6	44	
13	Ventforet Kofu	34	9	14	11	27	31	−4	41	
14	Vegalta Sendai	34	9	11	14	35	50	−15	38	
15	Shimizu S-Pulse	34	10	6	18	42	60	−18	36	
16	Omiya Ardija (R)	34	9	8	17	44	60	−16	35	Relegation to 2015 J2 League
17	Cerezo Osaka (R)	34	7	10	17	36	48	−12	31	Relegation to 2015 J2 League
18	Tokushima Vortis (R)	34	3	5	26	16	74	−58	14	Relegation to 2015 J2 League

Updated to match(es) played on 8 December 2014. Source: J.League Data
Rules for classification: 1) points; 2) goal difference; 3) number of goals scored.
(C) Champions; (R) Relegated

== Positions by round ==
Team ╲ Round	1	2	3	4	5	6	7	8	9	10	11	12	13	14	15	16	17	18	19	20	21	22	23	24	25	26	27	28	29	30	31	32	33	34
Gamba Osaka	14	5	9	11	14	16	15	13	14	15	16	15	11	16	13	11	8	6	5	7	8	7	5	5	5	4	2	2	2	2	2	2	1	1
Urawa Red Diamonds	6	9	5	5	11	6	4	3	5	4	1	2	2	1	1	1	1	2	1	1	1	1	1	1	1	1	1	1	1	1	1	1	2	2
Kashima Antlers	2	1	1	1	1	1	2	4	1	1	2	3	7	4	4	4	4	4	4	4	3	3	4	4	3	2	3	4	4	3	3	3	3	3
Kashiwa Reysol	10	12	14	10	12	9	9	10	9	6	6	7	4	5	6	7	9	8	9	6	7	6	8	9	8	9	9	8	7	6	6	5	5	4
Sagan Tosu	1	1	4	9	4	8	5	5	3	5	3	1	1	2	2	2	2	1	1	3	2	2	3	3	4	5	5	3	5	5	4	4	4	5
Kawasaki Frontale	8	14	16	14	9	4	7	8	8	9	7	8	6	8	3	3	3	3	3	2	4	4	2	2	2	3	4	5	3	4	5	6	6	6
Yokohama F. Marinos	3	3	2	3	5	7	10	11	13	14	11	12	15	12	9	8	10	11	11	11	10	10	10	10	10	10	10	10	8	10	10	7	7	7
Sanfrecce Hiroshima	6	4	7	6	3	2	1	2	4	2	4	4	5	6	7	5	5	7	6	8	9	9	9	7	9	8	8	7	9	8	8	9	9	8
FC Tokyo	10	12	13	16	15	12	13	12	10	10	12	13	12	10	10	9	7	5	7	5	5	8	7	8	6	6	6	6	6	7	7	8	8	9
Nagoya Grampus	12	7	6	4	6	11	12	15	15	13	14	11	13	15	15	14	14	15	16	14	14	14	12	12	11	12	12	12	12	12	11	12	11	10
Vissel Kobe	8	11	8	12	7	3	3	1	2	3	5	6	3	3	5	6	6	9	8	9	6	5	6	6	7	7	7	9	10	9	9	10	10	11
Albirex Niigata	5	10	10	6	8	10	6	7	7	7	8	5	8	7	8	10	11	10	10	10	11	11	11	11	12	11	11	11	11	11	12	11	12	12
Ventforet Kofu	17	15	15	13	13	15	16	14	12	12	13	14	16	14	16	16	16	14	14	15	15	15	15	15	13	13	14	15	16	13	13	13	13	13
Vegalta Sendai	13	16	17	17	17	17	17	17	17	17	17	17	14	11	11	12	13	13	13	12	12	13	14	14	14	15	13	13	13	14	14	14	14	14
Shimizu S-Pulse	4	8	12	15	16	14	11	6	6	8	10	10	9	9	12	15	12	12	12	13	13	12	13	13	15	17	16	16	15	16	15	15	15	15
Omiya Ardija	16	16	11	8	10	13	14	16	16	16	15	16	17	17	17	17	17	17	17	17	17	17	17	17	17	16	15	14	14	15	16	16	16	16
Cerezo Osaka	15	5	3	2	2	5	8	9	11	11	9	9	10	13	14	13	15	16	15	16	16	16	16	16	16	14	17	17	17	17	17	17	17	17
Tokushima Vortis	18	18	18	18	18	18	18	18	18	18	18	18	18	18	18	18	18	18	18	18	18	18	18	18	18	18	18	18	18	18	18	18	18	18

Leader and qualification to 2015 AFC Champions League group stage
Qualification to 2015 AFC Champions League group stage
Qualification to 2015 AFC Champions League qualifying play-off
Relegation to 2015 J2 League

Updated to match(es) played on 8 December 2014. Source: J. League data site
Note 1: Matchday 12 results for 2014 AFC Champions League Participants (Sanfrecce Hiroshima vs. Yokohama F. Marinos, Cerezo Osaka vs. Kawasaki Frontale), held on 15 July 2014, are included in Matchday 15 ranking. Sanfrecce Hiroshima, Kawasaki Frontale and Cerezo Osaka qualified to the Round of 16 of the 2014 AFC Champions League, in which the First Leg matches overlap with matches for Matchday 12

== Results ==
Home \ Away	ALB	ANT	ARD	CER	FMA	FRO	GAM	GRA	RED	REY	SAG	SFR	SSP	TOK	VEG	VEN	VIS	VOR
Albirex Niigata		1–2	2–1	1–0	0–0	3–0	0–2	1–1	0–2	0–2	1–0	0–0	2–1	0–1	1–0	0–0	1–1	1–2
Kashima Antlers	1–2		2–2	0–2	1–0	2–1	2–3	1–2	1–1	2–3	0–1	5–1	2–1	2–2	2–0	1–0	2–3	1–0
Omiya Ardija	2–2	2–1		2–0	2–3	1–3	0–2	1–2	0–2	1–2	1–3	3–3	2–1	1–0	4–0	0–2	0–3	1–3
Cerezo Osaka	0–0	1–4	1–1		2–2	1–2	2–2	1–2	1–0	2–0	0–1	0–1	4–1	0–0	0–1	1–3	1–2	3–1
Yokohama F. Marinos	1–0	1–3	2–0	0–0		2–0	2–0	0–2	0–1	2–2	1–2	1–0	1–0	0–1	0–2	0–0	1–1	3–0
Kawasaki Frontale	1–0	4–1	3–4	5–4	0–3		2–1	1–0	2–1	1–1	2–0	1–1	2–3	0–0	1–1	2–0	2–2	4–0
Gamba Osaka	5–0	0–2	2–1	2–0	2–0	1–0		0–1	0–1	1–2	4–1	1–1	4–0	2–1	1–1	2–0	3–1	3–0
Nagoya Grampus	0–1	2–3	2–1	1–2	1–1	1–1	1–2		1–2	1–1	2–3	2–5	2–3	2–2	0–0	2–0	2–1	1–1
Urawa Red Diamonds	1–0	1–1	4–0	1–0	1–0	1–0	0–2	1–2		3–1	0–1	1–0	1–1	1–0	4–0	0–0	2–2	2–1
Kashiwa Reysol	1–0	1–0	2–2	2–1	0–0	4–1	1–0	0–1	3–2		2–0	0–0	3–1	1–1	0–0	3–0	2–0	2–0
Sagan Tosu	0–2	0–3	1–1	1–0	1–0	0–1	2–0	1–0	1–1	1–0		1–2	2–2	0–2	2–1	2–0	2–1	5–0
Sanfrecce Hiroshima	2–0	0–3	1–1	0–0	1–2	2–1	0–1	4–0	0–2	5–2	1–0		1–1	1–0	2–0	1–1	1–1	3–1
Shimizu S-Pulse	2–1	1–3	2–0	3–0	0–1	0–2	0–3	2–2	1–4	3–0	0–1	1–3		1–3	1–0	0–0	1–1	1–0
FC Tokyo	1–3	1–1	0–1	2–0	1–1	0–4	3–0	0–1	4–4	4–0	2–1	2–1	4–0		3–0	1–1	1–1	4–0
Vegalta Sendai	1–2	0–1	2–2	3–3	1–2	0–0	0–0	3–3	4–2	1–2	0–3	1–0	3–2	1–0		1–1	4–3	2–1
Ventforet Kofu	1–1	0–4	0–1	0–0	1–0	2–1	3–3	2–0	0–0	3–0	1–0	2–0	0–1	0–0	0–0		2–0	0–1
Vissel Kobe	1–0	0–0	2–1	2–2	1–2	1–2	1–5	1–3	3–1	1–1	0–1	0–0	3–1	2–1	2–1	1–0		3–0
Tokushima Vortis	1–2	0–5	0–2	0–2	0–3	0–4	0–0	0–2	0–2	0–2	0–1	0–1	0–4	0–0	0–1	2–2	2–2	

Updated to match(es) played on 8 December 2014. Source: J. League Data
Legend: Blue = home team win; Yellow = draw; Red = away team win.

== Top scorers ==
Rank	Scorer	Club	Goals
1	(Japan) Yoshito Ōkubo	Kawasaki Frontale	18
2	(Japan) Yohei Toyoda	Sagan Tosu	15
3	(Brazil) Marquinhos	Vissel Kobe	14
4	(Brazil) Pedro Júnior	Vissel Kobe	13
4	(Japan) Yoshinori Muto	FC Tokyo	13
4	(Slovenia) Milivoje Novaković	Shimizu S-Pulse	13
8	(Japan) Kensuke Nagai	Nagoya Grampus	12
8	(Japan) Shinzo Koroki	Urawa Red Diamonds	12
8	(Japan) Yu Kobayashi	Kawasaki Frontale	12
11	(Brazil) Edu	FC Tokyo	11
11	(Brazil) Leandro	Kashiwa Reysol	11
11	(Japan) Hisato Satō	Sanfrecce Hiroshima	11

Updated to games played on 8 December 2014
Source: J. League Data

== Awards ==
=== Individual ===
Award	Recipient	Club
Most Valuable Player	(Japan) Yasuhito Endō	Gamba Osaka
Rookie of the Year	(Brazil) Caio	Kashima Antlers
Manager of the Year	(Japan) Kenta Hasegawa	Gamba Osaka
Top Scorer	(Japan) Yoshito Ōkubo	Kawasaki Frontale

=== Best Eleven ===
Position	Footballer	Club	Nationality
GK	Shusaku Nishikawa (3)	Urawa Red Diamonds	Japan
DF	Kosuke Ota (1)	FC Tokyo	Japan
DF	Masato Morishige (2)	FC Tokyo	Japan
DF	Tsukasa Shiotani (1)	Sanfrecce Hiroshima	Japan
MF	Léo Silva (1)	Albirex Niigata	Brazil
MF	Gaku Shibasaki (1)	Kashima Antlers	Japan
MF	Yasuhito Endō (11)	Gamba Osaka	Japan
MF	Yoshinori Muto (1)	FC Tokyo	Japan
FW	Patric (1)	Gamba Osaka	Brazil
FW	Takashi Usami (1)	Gamba Osaka	Japan
FW	Yoshito Ōkubo (2)	Kawasaki Frontale	Japan

* The number in brackets denotes the number of times that the footballer has appeared in the Best 11.

== Attendances ==
Pos	Team	Total	High	Low	Average	Change
1	Urawa Red Diamonds	603,770	56,758	0	35,516	−4.3%
2	FC Tokyo	428,184	42,059	13,048	25,187	+0.5%
3	Yokohama F. Marinos	392,496	40,571	11,088	23,088	−16.0%
4	Albirex Niigata	390,648	35,533	2,104	22,979	−12.0%
5	Cerezo Osaka	367,651	42,723	10,262	21,627	+14.9%
6	Kashima Antlers	300,310	32,099	8,840	17,665	+7.6%
7	Nagoya Grampus	284,474	38,966	5,599	16,733	+3.7%
8	Kawasaki Frontale	283,241	19,668	10,609	16,661	+0.1%
9	Vegalta Sendai	257,949	18,914	11,144	15,173	+2.1%
10	Vissel Kobe	255,185	25,382	9,375	15,010	+30.3%^{†}
11	Sanfrecce Hiroshima	254,951	24,734	9,515	14,997	−7.5%
12	Gamba Osaka	250,738	19,569	10,898	14,749	+20.0%^{†}
13	Shimizu S-Pulse	241,577	19,824	8,539	14,210	+0.5%
14	Sagan Tosu	240,323	23,277	8,276	14,137	+22.8%
15	Ventforet Kofu	206,904	36,505	5,416	12,170	−3.5%
16	Omiya Ardija	183,791	14,182	7,001	10,811	−2.9%
17	Kashiwa Reysol	182,161	14,623	6,115	10,715	−14.6%
18	Tokushima Vortis	151,034	17,274	3,594	8,884	+104.3%^{†}
	League total	5,275,387	56,758	0	17,240	+0.1%

Updated to games played on 8 December 2014
Source: J. League Data
Notes:
^{†} Team played previous season in J2.
