= 2014 Omiya Ardija season =

Omiya Ardija
2014 season
- Manager: Kiyoshi Okuma; Hiroki Shibuya
- Stadium: NACK5 Stadium Omiya
- J1 League: 16th

The 2014 season for Omiya Ardija.

== J1 League ==
=== League table ===
Pos	Team	Pld	W	D	L	GF	GA	GD	Pts	Qualification or relegation
14	Vegalta Sendai	34	9	11	14	35	50	−15	38	
15	Shimizu S-Pulse	34	10	6	18	42	60	−18	36	
16	Omiya Ardija (R)	34	9	8	17	44	60	−16	35	Relegation to 2015 J2 League
17	Cerezo Osaka (R)	34	7	10	17	36	48	−12	31	Relegation to 2015 J2 League
18	Tokushima Vortis (R)	34	3	5	26	16	74	−58	14	Relegation to 2015 J2 League

Updated to match(es) played on 8 December 2014. Source: J.League Data
Rules for classification: 1) points; 2) goal difference; 3) number of goals scored.
(R) Relegated

=== Match details ===
Match	Date	Team	Score	Team	Venue	Attendance
1	2014.03.02	Yokohama F. Marinos	2-0	Omiya Ardija	Nissan Stadium	23,166
2	2014.03.08	Omiya Ardija	1-2	Nagoya Grampus	NACK5 Stadium Omiya	9,980
3	2014.03.15	Kawasaki Frontale	3-4	Omiya Ardija	Kawasaki Todoroki Stadium	13,498
4	2014.03.23	Omiya Ardija	4-0	Vegalta Sendai	NACK5 Stadium Omiya	10,465
5	2014.03.29	Kashiwa Reysol	2-2	Omiya Ardija	Hitachi Kashiwa Stadium	11,568
6	2014.04.06	Omiya Ardija	0-3	Vissel Kobe	NACK5 Stadium Omiya	9,870
7	2014.04.12	Shimizu S-Pulse	2-0	Omiya Ardija	IAI Stadium Nihondaira	11,497
8	2014.04.19	Gamba Osaka	2-1	Omiya Ardija	Expo '70 Commemorative Stadium	11,059
9	2014.04.26	Omiya Ardija	0-2	Ventforet Kofu	NACK5 Stadium Omiya	9,882
10	2014.04.29	Cerezo Osaka	1-1	Omiya Ardija	Yanmar Stadium Nagai	19,367
11	2014.05.03	Omiya Ardija	2-2	Albirex Niigata	NACK5 Stadium Omiya	12,105
12	2014.05.06	FC Tokyo	0-1	Omiya Ardija	Ajinomoto Stadium	23,722
13	2014.05.10	Omiya Ardija	0-2	Urawa Reds	NACK5 Stadium Omiya	13,348
14	2014.05.17	Sagan Tosu	1-1	Omiya Ardija	Best Amenity Stadium	11,339
15	2014.07.19	Omiya Ardija	3-3	Sanfrecce Hiroshima	NACK5 Stadium Omiya	9,272
16	2014.07.23	Kashima Antlers	2-2	Omiya Ardija	Kashima Soccer Stadium	8,840
17	2014.07.27	Omiya Ardija	1-3	Tokushima Vortis	NACK5 Stadium Omiya	8,123
18	2014.08.02	Vegalta Sendai	2-2	Omiya Ardija	Yurtec Stadium Sendai	14,931
19	2014.08.09	Omiya Ardija	0-2	Gamba Osaka	NACK5 Stadium Omiya	10,541
20	2014.08.16	Albirex Niigata	2-1	Omiya Ardija	Denka Big Swan Stadium	26,949
21	2014.08.23	Omiya Ardija	1-3	Sagan Tosu	NACK5 Stadium Omiya	8,718
22	2014.08.30	Urawa Reds	4-0	Omiya Ardija	Saitama Stadium 2002	42,308
23	2014.09.13	Omiya Ardija	2-1	Kashima Antlers	Kumagaya Athletic Stadium	14,182
24	2014.09.20	Tokushima Vortis	0-2	Omiya Ardija	Pocarisweat Stadium	5,996
25	2014.09.23	Omiya Ardija	1-3	Kawasaki Frontale	NACK5 Stadium Omiya	12,848
26	2014.09.27	Omiya Ardija	2-1	Shimizu S-Pulse	NACK5 Stadium Omiya	11,684
27	2014.10.05	Ventforet Kofu	0-1	Omiya Ardija	Yamanashi Chuo Bank Stadium	5,416
28	2014.10.18	Omiya Ardija	1-0	FC Tokyo	NACK5 Stadium Omiya	11,901
29	2014.10.22	Omiya Ardija	2-3	Yokohama F. Marinos	NACK5 Stadium Omiya	7,001
30	2014.10.26	Vissel Kobe	2-1	Omiya Ardija	Noevir Stadium Kobe	12,826
31	2014.11.02	Sanfrecce Hiroshima	1-1	Omiya Ardija	Edion Stadium Hiroshima	14,024
32	2014.11.22	Omiya Ardija	1-2	Kashiwa Reysol	NACK5 Stadium Omiya	11,836
33	2014.11.29	Nagoya Grampus	2-1	Omiya Ardija	Toyota Stadium	21,695
34	2014.12.06	Omiya Ardija	2-0	Cerezo Osaka	NACK5 Stadium Omiya	12,035
