= 2015 Omiya Ardija season =

Omiya Ardija
2015 season
- Manager: Hiroki Shibuya
- Stadium: NACK5 Stadium Omiya
- J2 League: 1st

2015 Omiya Ardija season.

== J2 League ==
=== League table ===
| Pos | Team | Pld | W | D | L | GF | GA | GD | Pts | Promotion, qualification or relegation |
|---|---|---|---|---|---|---|---|---|---|---|
| 1 | Omiya Ardija (C, P) | 42 | 26 | 8 | 8 | 72 | 37 | +35 | 86 | Promotion to 2016 J1 League |
| 2 | Júbilo Iwata (P) | 42 | 24 | 10 | 8 | 72 | 43 | +29 | 82 | Promotion to 2016 J1 League |
| 3 | Avispa Fukuoka (O, P) | 42 | 24 | 10 | 8 | 63 | 37 | +26 | 82 | Qualification for promotion playoffs (Note: Only teams that meet J1 license criteria can participate in promotion playoffs. If one or more teams fail to meet the criteria, only eligible teams that finished 3rd to 6th will participate and no replacement teams will be added.) |
| 4 | Cerezo Osaka | 42 | 18 | 13 | 11 | 57 | 40 | +17 | 67 | Qualification for promotion playoffs |
| 5 | Ehime FC | 42 | 19 | 8 | 15 | 47 | 39 | +8 | 65 | Qualification for promotion playoffs |

Source: Meiji Yasuda J2 League Standing
Rules for classification: 1) Points; 2) Goal difference; 3) Goals scored
(C) Champions; (O) Play-off winners; (P) Promoted

=== Match details ===
| Match | Date | Team | Score | Team | Venue | Attendance |
|---|---|---|---|---|---|---|
| 1 | 2015.03.08 | Omiya Ardija | 1-0 | Zweigen Kanazawa | NACK5 Stadium Omiya | 8,635 |
| 2 | 2015.03.15 | Cerezo Osaka | 3-1 | Omiya Ardija | Yanmar Stadium Nagai | 15,584 |
| 3 | 2015.03.21 | Omiya Ardija | 2-1 | Kyoto Sanga FC | NACK5 Stadium Omiya | 7,173 |
| 4 | 2015.03.29 | Omiya Ardija | 1-1 | Consadole Sapporo | NACK5 Stadium Omiya | 10,491 |
| 5 | 2015.04.01 | Fagiano Okayama | 0-0 | Omiya Ardija | City Light Stadium | 8,153 |
| 6 | 2015.04.05 | Omiya Ardija | 2-0 | Roasso Kumamoto | NACK5 Stadium Omiya | 5,428 |
| 7 | 2015.04.11 | JEF United Chiba | 2-0 | Omiya Ardija | Fukuda Denshi Arena | 11,580 |
| 8 | 2015.04.19 | Oita Trinita | 0-3 | Omiya Ardija | Oita Bank Dome | 6,307 |
| 9 | 2015.04.26 | Omiya Ardija | 2-1 | Mito HollyHock | NACK5 Stadium Omiya | 7,564 |
| 10 | 2015.04.29 | Tokushima Vortis | 0-0 | Omiya Ardija | Pocarisweat Stadium | 4,316 |
| 11 | 2015.05.03 | Omiya Ardija | 1-0 | Ehime FC | NACK5 Stadium Omiya | 8,374 |
| 12 | 2015.05.06 | Omiya Ardija | 2-0 | Giravanz Kitakyushu | NACK5 Stadium Omiya | 7,702 |
| 13 | 2015.05.09 | Thespakusatsu Gunma | 0-2 | Omiya Ardija | Shoda Shoyu Stadium Gunma | 6,380 |
| 14 | 2015.05.17 | Omiya Ardija | 1-1 | Júbilo Iwata | NACK5 Stadium Omiya | 13,285 |
| 15 | 2015.05.24 | FC Gifu | 0-5 | Omiya Ardija | Gifu Nagaragawa Stadium | 6,011 |
| 16 | 2015.05.31 | Omiya Ardija | 2-0 | Avispa Fukuoka | NACK5 Stadium Omiya | 8,543 |
| 17 | 2015.06.06 | Omiya Ardija | 2-0 | Kamatamare Sanuki | NACK5 Stadium Omiya | 7,693 |
| 18 | 2015.06.14 | Tochigi SC | 0-2 | Omiya Ardija | Tochigi Green Stadium | 8,595 |
| 19 | 2015.06.21 | Yokohama FC | 0-3 | Omiya Ardija | NHK Spring Mitsuzawa Football Stadium | 4,777 |
| 20 | 2015.06.28 | Omiya Ardija | 0-2 | Tokyo Verdy | NACK5 Stadium Omiya | 10,401 |
| 21 | 2015.07.04 | V-Varen Nagasaki | 0-1 | Omiya Ardija | Nagasaki Stadium | 4,629 |
| 22 | 2015.07.08 | Consadole Sapporo | 2-3 | Omiya Ardija | Sapporo Dome | 9,140 |
| 23 | 2015.07.12 | Omiya Ardija | 3-0 | Fagiano Okayama | NACK5 Stadium Omiya | 10,077 |
| 24 | 2015.07.18 | Avispa Fukuoka | 1-3 | Omiya Ardija | Level5 Stadium | 8,179 |
| 25 | 2015.07.22 | Omiya Ardija | 3-0 | Yokohama FC | NACK5 Stadium Omiya | 9,737 |
| 26 | 2015.07.26 | Omiya Ardija | 5-0 | FC Gifu | NACK5 Stadium Omiya | 8,329 |
| 27 | 2015.08.01 | Giravanz Kitakyushu | 1-2 | Omiya Ardija | Honjo Stadium | 2,617 |
| 28 | 2015.08.08 | Omiya Ardija | 1-0 | Tochigi SC | NACK5 Stadium Omiya | 9,564 |
| 29 | 2015.08.15 | Ehime FC | 3-1 | Omiya Ardija | Ningineer Stadium | 3,733 |
| 30 | 2015.08.23 | Omiya Ardija | 1-1 | Thespakusatsu Gunma | NACK5 Stadium Omiya | 9,091 |
| 31 | 2015.09.13 | Mito HollyHock | 1-0 | Omiya Ardija | K's denki Stadium Mito | 5,360 |
| 32 | 2015.09.20 | Omiya Ardija | 1-2 | Cerezo Osaka | Kumagaya Athletic Stadium | 14,410 |
| 33 | 2015.09.23 | Tokyo Verdy | 0-1 | Omiya Ardija | Ajinomoto Stadium | 8,845 |
| 34 | 2015.09.27 | Omiya Ardija | 2-1 | JEF United Chiba | NACK5 Stadium Omiya | 12,029 |
| 35 | 2015.10.04 | Júbilo Iwata | 2-2 | Omiya Ardija | Yamaha Stadium | 13,569 |
| 36 | 2015.10.10 | Roasso Kumamoto | 3-0 | Omiya Ardija | Kumamoto Suizenji Stadium | 4,002 |
| 37 | 2015.10.18 | Omiya Ardija | 1-2 | Tokushima Vortis | NACK5 Stadium Omiya | 9,559 |
| 38 | 2015.10.25 | Kyoto Sanga FC | 2-2 | Omiya Ardija | Kyoto Nishikyogoku Athletic Stadium | 9,380 |
| 39 | 2015.11.01 | Omiya Ardija | 2-1 | V-Varen Nagasaki | NACK5 Stadium Omiya | 10,600 |
| 40 | 2015.11.08 | Kamatamare Sanuki | 1-1 | Omiya Ardija | Pikara Stadium | 3,864 |
| 41 | 2015.11.14 | Omiya Ardija | 3-2 | Oita Trinita | NACK5 Stadium Omiya | 10,595 |
| 42 | 2015.11.23 | Zweigen Kanazawa | 1-2 | Omiya Ardija | Ishikawa Athletics Stadium | 8,826 |
