= 2013 Omiya Ardija season =

Omiya Ardija
2013 season
- Manager: Zdenko Verdenik; Takeyuki Okamoto; Tsutomu Ogura
- Stadium: NACK5 Stadium Omiya
- J1 League: 14th

2013 Omiya Ardija season.

== J1 League ==
=== League table ===
Pos	Team	Pld	W	D	L	GF	GA	GD	Pts	Qualification or relegation
12	Sagan Tosu	34	13	7	14	54	63	−9	46	
13	Vegalta Sendai	34	11	12	11	41	38	+3	45	
14	Omiya Ardija	34	14	3	17	45	48	−3	45	
15	Ventforet Kofu	34	8	13	13	30	41	−11	37	
16	Shonan Bellmare (R)	34	6	7	21	34	62	−28	25	Relegation to 2014 J.League Division 2

Updated to match(es) played on 7 December 2013. Source: J.League Division 1
Rules for classification: 1) points; 2) goal difference; 3) number of goals scored.
(R) Relegated

=== Match details ===
Match	Date	Team	Score	Team	Venue	Attendance
1	2013.03.02	Omiya Ardija	2-2	Shimizu S-Pulse	NACK5 Stadium Omiya	11,330
2	2013.03.09	Júbilo Iwata	0-1	Omiya Ardija	Yamaha Stadium	10,773
3	2013.03.16	Omiya Ardija	1-1	Albirex Niigata	NACK5 Stadium Omiya	10,485
4	2013.03.30	Omiya Ardija	3-1	Kashima Antlers	NACK5 Stadium Omiya	11,492
5	2013.04.06	FC Tokyo	0-1	Omiya Ardija	Ajinomoto Stadium	13,859
6	2013.04.13	Cerezo Osaka	1-2	Omiya Ardija	Osaka Nagai Stadium	13,384
7	2013.04.20	Omiya Ardija	1-0	Urawa Reds	NACK5 Stadium Omiya	13,016
8	2013.04.26	Kashiwa Reysol	0-4	Omiya Ardija	Hitachi Kashiwa Stadium	8,086
9	2013.05.03	Oita Trinita	0-2	Omiya Ardija	Oita Bank Dome	11,334
10	2013.05.06	Omiya Ardija	2-1	Sanfrecce Hiroshima	NACK5 Stadium Omiya	13,365
11	2013.05.11	Vegalta Sendai	2-1	Omiya Ardija	Yurtec Stadium Sendai	14,327
12	2013.05.18	Omiya Ardija	2-1	Shonan Bellmare	NACK5 Stadium Omiya	10,886
13	2013.05.25	Ventforet Kofu	0-3	Omiya Ardija	Yamanashi Chuo Bank Stadium	11,063
14	2013.07.06	Omiya Ardija	1-1	Sagan Tosu	NACK5 Stadium Omiya	12,449
15	2013.07.10	Omiya Ardija	2-1	Nagoya Grampus	NACK5 Stadium Omiya	9,644
16	2013.07.13	Yokohama F. Marinos	2-1	Omiya Ardija	Nissan Stadium	29,722
17	2013.07.17	Omiya Ardija	2-3	Kawasaki Frontale	NACK5 Stadium Omiya	7,412
18	2013.07.31	Sanfrecce Hiroshima	3-1	Omiya Ardija	Edion Stadium Hiroshima	16,351
19	2013.08.03	Kashima Antlers	1-0	Omiya Ardija	Kashima Soccer Stadium	14,925
20	2013.08.10	Omiya Ardija	0-3	Cerezo Osaka	NACK5 Stadium Omiya	12,093
21	2013.08.17	Sagan Tosu	2-1	Omiya Ardija	Best Amenity Stadium	22,530
22	2013.08.24	Omiya Ardija	2-3	Kashiwa Reysol	NACK5 Stadium Omiya	11,661
23	2013.08.28	Kawasaki Frontale	2-1	Omiya Ardija	Kawasaki Todoroki Stadium	14,026
24	2013.08.31	Omiya Ardija	1-0	Yokohama F. Marinos	NACK5 Stadium Omiya	12,932
25	2013.09.14	Albirex Niigata	1-0	Omiya Ardija	Tohoku Denryoku Big Swan Stadium	33,378
26	2013.09.21	Omiya Ardija	0-2	Vegalta Sendai	NACK5 Stadium Omiya	11,185
27	2013.09.28	Omiya Ardija	2-5	FC Tokyo	NACK5 Stadium Omiya	11,539
28	2013.10.05	Urawa Reds	4-0	Omiya Ardija	Saitama Stadium 2002	47,790
29	2013.10.19	Omiya Ardija	0-1	Oita Trinita	Kumagaya Athletic Stadium	9,469
30	2013.10.27	Nagoya Grampus	2-1	Omiya Ardija	Toyota Stadium	14,016
31	2013.11.10	Omiya Ardija	1-2	Ventforet Kofu	NACK5 Stadium Omiya	9,059
32	2013.11.23	Shimizu S-Pulse	1-0	Omiya Ardija	IAI Stadium Nihondaira	13,151
33	2013.11.30	Omiya Ardija	3-0	Júbilo Iwata	NACK5 Stadium Omiya	11,325
34	2013.12.07	Shonan Bellmare	0-1	Omiya Ardija	Shonan BMW Stadium Hiratsuka	9,257
