= Hiroki Shibuya =

Japanese footballer and manager

Hiroki Shibuya 渋谷 洋樹
Personal information
- Full name: Hiroki Shibuya
- Date of birth: November 30, 1966 (age 59)
- Place of birth: Muroran, Hokkaido, Japan
- Height: 1.73 m (5 ft 8 in)
- Position: Defender

Team information
- Current team: Ventforet Kofu (manager)

Youth career
- 1982–1984: Muroran Otani High School

Senior career*
Years	Team	Apps	(Gls)
1985–1992	JEF United Ichihara		
1992–1994	Tosu Futures		
1995–1997	NTT Kanto		

Managerial career
- 2014–2017: Omiya Ardija
- 2018–2019: Roasso Kumamoto
- 2022: Júbilo Iwata
- 2026–: Ventforet Kofu
Medal record
JEF United Ichihara
Winner	Japan Soccer League	1985/86
Winner	JSL Cup	1986
Runner-up	JSL Cup	1990
- * Club domestic league appearances and goals

Hiroki Shibuya (渋谷 洋樹, Shibuya Hiroki; born November 30, 1966) is a Japanese football manager and former football player He is the currently manager for J2 League club Ventforet Kofu.

== Playing career ==
Shibuya born in Muroran in 1966. After graduating from high school, he joined Furukawa Electric (later JEF United Ichihara) in 1985. The club won the champions 1985–86 Japan Soccer League and 1986 JSL Cup. In Asia, the club won the champions 1986 Asian Club Championship. This is first Asian champions as Japanese club. In 1992, he moved to PJM Futures (later Tosu Futures). In 1995, he moved to NTT Kanto (later Omiya Ardija). He retired in 1997.

== Coaching career ==
After retiring, Shibuya spent his whole coaching career with Omiya Ardija, first as youth squad's coach and then as assistant coach. On the verge of relegation, he was appointed in August 2014. Despite relegation, he was confirmed for guiding the team in its first season in J2 after 10 years of J.League.

On 28 May 2017, with a record of only 2 wins in 13 league matches, and a 6 match losing streak, he was sacked by the club.

On 14 December 2017, Shibuya was named manager of Japanese club J2 League club Roasso Kumamoto for the 2018 season. However Roasso finished at the 21st place of 22 clubs in 2018 season and was relegated to J3 League.

== Managerial statistics ==
Year	League	Club	League campaign					Cup campaign	
Year	League	Club	Rank	G	W	D	L	J. League Cup	The Emperor's Cup
2014	J1	Omiya	16	12	6	1	5	-	Quarter-final
2015	J2	Omiya	1	42	26	8	8	-	3rd Round
2016	J1	Omiya	5	34	15	11	8	Quarter-finals	Semifinal
2017	J1	Omiya	18	13	2	1	10	Group stage	-
2018	J2	Kumamoto	21	42	9	7	26	-	2nd Round
2019	J3	Kumamoto	5	34	16	9	9	-	2nd Round
2022	J1	Iwata	18	9	1	5	3	-	-
