= 2007 Emperor's Cup =

Tournament details
- Country: Japan
- Teams: 80

Final positions
- Champions: Kashima Antlers (3rd title)
- Runners-up: Sanfrecce Hiroshima

Tournament statistics
- Matches played: 79

The 87th Emperor's Cup has been held between September 16, 2007 and January 1, 2008. It was won by Kashima Antlers.

== Schedule ==
Round	Date	Fixture	Clubs	Byes/Exemptions
First Round		20	40→20	39: non-seeded prefectural representative clubs 1: University representative
Second Round		14	20+8→14	8: seeded prefectural representative clubs
Third Round		14	14+13+1→14	14: J2 clubs (13) and JFL Champions
Fourth Round		16	14+18→16	18: J1 clubs
Fifth Round	December 8 and 15	8	16→8	
Quarterfinals	December 22 and 23	4	8→4	
Semifinals	December 29	2	4→2	
Final	January 1, 2008	1	2→1	

== Matches ==
=== First round ===
2007-09-16
13:00

Viancone Fukushima	0–1	V-Varen Nagasaki
		Oda 64'

J Village, Futaba

2007-09-16
13:00

Ohara Gakuen JaSRA	4–5	Hachinohe University
Shoji 14'; Toshima 42'; Ikarino 47', 81'		Konno 25'; Takahashi 37', 74'; Matsushima 89'; Ito 89'

Matsumotodaira Football Stadium, Matsumoto

2007-09-16
13:00

Banditonce Kobe	5–0	Yamagata University
Yoshida 5', 16'; Kawabuchi 63', 83'; Yamamichi 74'

Kakogawa Athletic Stadium, Kakogawa

2007-09-16
13:00

Tenri University	3–1	Tonan Maebashi
Shimada 7', Tanaka 39'; Fukuda 78'		Kimori 25'

Nara Prefectural Kashihara Park, Kashihara

2007-09-16
13:00

Gainare Tottori	2–0	Saga University
Nishimura 35'; Akita 48'

Tottori Bank Bird Stadium, Tottori

2007-09-16
13:00

NIFS Kanoya	1–1	Ryutsu Keizai University FC
Higa 38'		Iida 42'
Penalties
	4–3

Kagoshima Kamoike Stadium, Kagoshima

2007-09-16
13:00

Barefoot Hokkaido	1–3	Osaka University of Health and Sport Sciences
Ito 74'		Yamashita 68', 70'; Okubo 77'

Sapporo Atsubetsu Park Stadium, Sapporo

2007-09-16
13:00

FC Gifu	3–1	Fukuoka University of Education
Moriyama 22'; Watada 33', 42'		Onoue 82'

Gifu Nagaragawa Stadium, Gifu

2007-09-16
13:00

Okinawa Kariyushi	7–0	Hisaeda FC
Miyagawa 5', 20', 54'; Takahata 59'; Asami 70', 89'; Matsuda 88'

Okinawa General Sports and Athletics Ground, Okinawa

2007-09-16
13:00

Hiroshima Shudo University	1–2	Japan Soccer College
Tanaka 82'		Sato 12'; Keishi Uchino 29'

Fukuyama Takegahana Stadium, Fukuyama

2007-09-16
13:00

Kamatamare Sanuki	1–4	Mitsubishi Mizushima FC
Katou 26'		Kobayashi 8'; Yamashita 50'; Matsuoka 78'; Takamatsu 89'

Kagawa Sports Park, Takamatsu

2007-09-16
13:00

Nirasaki Astros	0–8	TDK SC
		Ozawa 1'; Matsuda 27', 39', 47' (own goal) 37'; Togashi 55'; Ikeda 61', 79'

Yamanashi Chuo Bank Stadium, Kōfu

2007-09-16
13:00

Yokkaichi University	2–3	MIO Biwako Shiga
Nonaka 64', 82'		Abe 0'; Kotobuki 3'; Koyama 48'

Suzuka Sports Garden, Suzuka

2007-09-16
13:00

Oita Trinita U-18	0–1	Tokushima Vortis Second
		Okamoto 27'

Oita Athletic Stadium, Ōita

2007-09-16
13:00

Zweigen Kanazawa	3 – 2 (a.e.t.)	Roasso Kumamoto
Gondo 70', 76'; Nara 109'		Komorida 13'; Takahashi 29'

Kanazawa Soccer Stadium, Kanazawa

2007-09-16
13:00

FC Ganju Iwate	2–3	Saitama SC
Okamoto 28'; Oda 89'		Furuichi 13', 57'; Shimizu 38'

Morioka Minami Ball Park, Morioka

2007-09-16
13:00

FC Central Chūgoku	2–5	Kindai University High School
Saiki 39'; Fukuhara 69'		Miyamoto 7', 18', 86'; Kazumoto 82', 84'

Shimane Football Arena, Masuda

2007-09-17
13:00

Kōchi University	1–3	Juntendo University
Ishikawa 66'		(own goal) 37'; Tanaka 87'; Fukushi 89'

Kochi Haruno Athletic Stadium, Haruno

2007-09-16
13:00

Sagawa Printing SC	6–0	Sakai Phoenix
Machinaka 11', 79'; Azuma 21'; Takahashi 29'; Kanai 64'; Otsubo 83'

Yamashiro Park Taiyogaoka Stadium, Uji

2007-09-16
13:00

Sony Sendai FC	2–1	Renofa Yamaguchi FC
(own goal) 5'; Kaneko 87'		Matsubara 23'

Miyagi Soccer Ground, Rifu

=== Second round ===
2007-09-23
13:00

V-Varen Nagasaki	5–0	Hachinohe University
Tagami 42', 89'; Sano 46'; Takemura 58'; Iwamoto 85'

J Village, Futaba

2007-09-23
13:00

Banditonce Kobe	6–2	Tenri University
Kawabuchi 12', 54'; Yagara 44'; Nishimura 9'; Yamamichi 84'; Akita 88'		Taniguchi 23'; Fuse 68'

Hyōgo Prefectural Miki General Park, Miki

2007-09-23
13:00

Gainare Tottori	1–3	NIFS Kanoya
Tamura 73'		Kimura 15'; Higa 58', 82'

Matsue Athletic Stadium, Matsue

2007-09-23
13:00

Osaka University of Health and Sport Sciences	1–2	FC Gifu
Murata 83'		Sato 28'; Matsuda 44'

Sapporo Atsubetsu Park Stadium, Sapporo

2007-09-23
13:00

Okinawa Kariyushi	3–1	Japan Soccer College
Miyagawa 8'; Abe 37'; Kuninaka 52'		Sato 19'

Okinawa General Sports and Athletics Ground, Okinawa

2007-09-23
13:00

Mitsubishi Mizushima FC	0–2	TDK SC
		Ikeda 35'; Matsuda 42'

Kagawa Sports Park, Takamatsu

2007-09-23
13:00

Tochigi SC	2–1	MIO Biwako Shiga
Yokoyama 4', 62'		Tomita 34'

Tochigi Green Stadium, Utsunomiya

2007-09-23
13:00

University of Tsukuba	3–0	Tokushima Vortis Second
Sakuda 47'; Misawa 71'; Aso 80'

Hitachinaka City Stadium, Hitachinaka

2007-09-23
13:00

FC Kariya	0–1	Zweigen Kanazawa
		Daniro 13'

Ichinomiya Komyoji Park Playing Field, Ichinomiya

2007-09-23
13:00

Honda FC	2–0	Saitama SC
Nitta 18'; Suzuki 71'

Kusanagi Athletic Stadium, Shizuoka

2007-09-23
13:00

Honda Lock SC	3–1	Kindai University High School
Harada 79'; Taniguchi 87'; Mizunaga 89'		Iwahashi 56'

Miyazaki Ikime no Mori Ivy Stadium, Miyazaki

2007-09-23
13:00

Toho Titanium SC	0–2	Juntendo University
		Tanaka 51', 83'

Yamato Sports Center Stadium, Yamato

2007-09-23
13:00

ALO's Hokuriku	2–0	Sagawa Printing SC
Kim Myung-hwi 4'; Kamizono 77'

Takaoka Sports Core, Takaoka

2007-09-23
13:00

Meiji University	3–2	Sony Sendai FC
Yamamoto 54'; Hayashi 82', 89'		Ishihara 20'; Kirita 43'

Nishigaoka Soccer Stadium, Tokyo

=== Third round ===
2007-10-07
13:00

Shonan Bellmare	3–0	V-Varen Nagasaki
Hara 28'; Ishihara 78', 89'

Shonan BMW Stadium Hiratsuka, Hiratsuka

2007-10-07
13:00

Sagawa Shiga FC	4–0	Banditonce Kobe
Yamane 6'; Gokyu 16'; Tomiyama 61'; Shimada 64'

Sagawa Express Moriyama Stadium, Moriyama

2007-10-07
13:00

Montedio Yamagata	3–0	NIFS Kanoya
Nemoto 3', 17'; Motohashi 3'

ND Soft Stadium Yamagata, Tendō

2007-10-07
13:00

Tokushima Vortis	2–0	FC Gifu
Hasegawa 68'; Kobayashi 76'

Pocarisweat Stadium, Naruto

2007-10-07
13:00

Ehime FC	1 – 0 (a.e.t.)	Okinawa Kariyushi
Miki 113'

Ningineer Stadium, Matsuyama

2007-10-07
13:00

Consadole Sapporo	1–1	TDK SC
Ishii 4'		Matsugae 2'
Penalties
	9–10

Sapporo Atsubetsu Park Stadium, Sapporo

2007-10-07
13:00

Avispa Fukuoka	4–0	Tochigi SC
Alex 44'; Lincoln 53', 61'; Hayashi 76'

Level-5 Stadium, Fukuoka

2007-10-07
13:00

Sagan Tosu	1–0	University of Tsukuba
Takachi 73'

Saga Stadium, Saga

2007-10-07
13:00

Mito HollyHock	1–0	Zweigen Kanazawa
Muramatsu 44'

Kasamatsu Stadium, Naka

2007-10-07
13:00

Tokyo Verdy	0 – 1 (a.e.t.)	Honda FC
		Suzuki 106'

Ajinomoto Stadium, Chōfu

2007-10-07
13:00

Cerezo Osaka	4–2	Honda Lock SC
Kagawa 35', 89'; Morishima 50', 69'		Kishita 36'; Taniguchi 86'

Nagai Stadium, Osaka

2007-10-07
13:00

Vegalta Sendai	1 – 2 (a.e.t.)	Juntendo University
Tanoue 118'		Okamoto 117', 119'

Yurtec Stadium Sendai, Sendai

2007-10-07
13:00

Thespakusatsu Gunma	0–0	ALO's Hokuriku
Penalties
	5–4

Shoda Shoyu Stadium Gunma, Maebashi

2007-10-07
13:00

Kyoto Sanga FC	0–1	Meiji University
		Hayashi 86'

Nishikyogoku Athletic Stadium, Kyoto

=== Fourth round ===
Played on November 4, except Gamba vs. Yamagata and Kawasaki vs. Cerezo (November 7) and Urawa vs. Ehime (November 28 due to 2007 Asian Champions League commitments).

Tie no	Home team	Score^{1}	Away team
1	Gamba Osaka	2–2	Montedio Yamagata
Gamba won 5 – 3 on penalties
2	JEF United Ichihara Chiba	1–3	Oita Trinita
3	Shimizu S-Pulse	3–3	Meiji University
Shimizu won 5 – 4 on penalties
4	Yokohama F. Marinos	4–1	Sagawa Printing SC
5	Albirex Niigata	2–3	Sagan Tosu
6	FC Tokyo	2–1	TDK SC
7	Júbilo Iwata	6–1	Juntendo University
8	Sanfrecce Hiroshima	3–0	Shonan Bellmare
9	Urawa Red Diamonds	0–2	Ehime FC
10	Omiya Ardija	0–2	Yokohama FC
11	Kawasaki Frontale	3–0	Cerezo Osaka
12	Avispa Fukuoka	0–2	Vissel Kobe
13	Kashima Antlers	2–0	Mito HollyHock
14	Ventforet Kofu	1–1	Tokushima Vortis
Kofu won 3 – 1 after extra time
15	Kashiwa Reysol	2–2	Honda FC
Honda won 2 – 3 after extra time
16	Nagoya Grampus Eight	3–1	Thespa Kusatsu

^{1}Score after 90 minutes

=== Fifth round ===
2007-12-08
13:00

Oita Trinita	1–3	Gamba Osaka
Takamatsu 45'	Report (in Japanese)	Terada 12', 75'; Bando 66'

Fukuda Denshi Arena, Chiba
Attendance: 3,285

2007-12-08
13:00

Shimizu S-Pulse	5 – 3 (a.e.t.)	Yokohama F. Marinos
Ichikawa 1'; Own goal 21'; Nishizawa 98', 104'; Hara 100'	Report (in Japanese)	Tanaka 71'; Ōshima 89'; Shimizu 116'

Momotaro Stadium, Okayama
Attendance: 5,108

2007-12-08
13:00

Sagan Tosu	1–2	FC Tokyo
Etō 9'	Report (in Japanese)	Kajiyama 19'; Hirayama 80'

Marugame Stadium, Marugame
Attendance: 4,512

2007-12-15
13:00

Sanfrecce Hiroshima	2–0	Júbilo Iwata
Morisaki 18', 51'	Report (in Japanese)

Hiroshima Big Arch, Hiroshima
Attendance: 3,177

2007-12-08
13:00

Ehime FC	2–1	Yokohama FC
Miyahara 11'; Hoshino 88'	Report (in Japanese)	Takizawa 21'

Nagasaki Prefectural Park, Isahaya
Attendance: 4,755

2007-12-08
13:00

Vissel Kobe	0–3	Kawasaki Frontale
	Report (in Japanese)	Mori 2'; Chong 31', 35'

Kobe Universiade Memorial Stadium, Kobe
Attendance: 4,702

2007-12-08
13:00

Kashima Antlers	2 – 1 (a.e.t.)	Ventforet Kofu
Tashiro 28'; Yanagisawa 109'	Report (in Japanese)	Kuno

Kashima Soccer Stadium, Kashima
Attendance: 6,558

2007-12-08
13:00

Honda FC	2–0	Nagoya Grampus
Suzuki 68'; Nitta 75'	Report (in Japanese)

Matsue Stadium, Matsue
Attendance: 3,755

=== Quarterfinals ===
2007-12-22
13:00

Gamba Osaka	1 – 0 (a.e.t.)	Shimizu S-Pulse
Terada 92'	Report (in Japanese)

Nagai Stadium, Osaka
Attendance: 8,575

2007-12-23
15:00

FC Tokyo	0–2	Sanfrecce Hiroshima
	Report (in Japanese)	Kashiwagi 13'; Komano 37'

KKWing Stadium, Kumamoto
Attendance: 5,148

2007-12-23
13:00

Ehime FC	0–2	Kawasaki Frontale
	Report (in Japanese)	Ōhashi 43'; Juninho 65'

Saitama Stadium, Saitama
Attendance: 8,484

2007-12-22
15:00

Kashima Antlers	1 – 0 (a.e.t.)	Honda FC
Yanagisawa 110'	Report (in Japanese)

Yurtec Stadium Sendai, Sendai
Attendance: 8,573

=== Semifinals ===
2007-12-29
13:00

Gamba Osaka	1–3	Sanfrecce Hiroshima
Baré 39'	Report (in Japanese)	Satō 1'; Hirashige 38'; Takayanagi 89'

Shizuoka Stadium, Fukuroi
Attendance: 6,128

2007-12-29
15:00

Kawasaki Frontale	0–1	Kashima Antlers
	Report (in Japanese)	Motoyama 72'

National Stadium, Tokyo
Attendance: 22,457

=== Final ===
2008-01-01
14:00

Sanfrecce Hiroshima	0–2	Kashima Antlers
	Report (in Japanese)	Uchida 8'; Danilo 35'

National Stadium, Tokyo
Attendance: 46,357
