= 2001 Omiya Ardija season =

Omiya Ardija
2001 season
- Manager: Toshiya Miura
- Stadium: Omiya Football Stadium
- J.League 2: 5th
- Emperor's Cup: 1st Round
- J.League Cup: 1st Round
- Top goalscorer: Jorge Dely Valdés (21)
Home colours	Away colours

2001 Omiya Ardija season

== Competitions ==
Competitions	Position
J.League 2	5th of 12 clubs
Emperor's Cup	1st round
J.League Cup	1st round

== Domestic results ==
=== J.League 2 ===
10 March 2001 1	Oita Trinita	1-2 (GG) (a.e.t.)	Omiya Ardija	Oita Athletic Stadium
JST (UTC+09)

20 March 2001 2	Omiya Ardija	1-2	Montedio Yamagata	Omiya Football Stadium
JST (UTC+09)

24 March 2001 3	Omiya Ardija	3-0	Mito HollyHock	Omiya Football Stadium
JST (UTC+09)

31 March 2001 4	Yokohama FC	1-1 (GG) (a.e.t.)	Omiya Ardija	Yokohama Mitsuzawa Stadium
JST (UTC+09)

7 April 2001 5	Omiya Ardija	3-1	Ventforet Kofu	Omiya Football Stadium
JST (UTC+09)

14 April 2001 6	Sagan Tosu	1-2	Omiya Ardija	Tosu Stadium
JST (UTC+09)

21 April 2001 7	Omiya Ardija	0-2	Kyoto Purple Sanga	Omiya Football Stadium
JST (UTC+09)

28 April 2001 8	Albirex Niigata	2-2 (GG) (a.e.t.)	Omiya Ardija	Niigata City Athletic Stadium
JST (UTC+09)

3 May 2001 9	Omiya Ardija	1-0	Kawasaki Frontale	Omiya Football Stadium
JST (UTC+09)

6 May 2001 10	Shonan Bellmare	3-3 (GG) (a.e.t.)	Omiya Ardija	Hiratsuka Athletics Stadium
JST (UTC+09)

12 May 2001 11	Omiya Ardija	2-0	Vegalta Sendai	Omiya Football Stadium
JST (UTC+09)

19 May 2001 12	Montedio Yamagata	1-2 (GG) (a.e.t.)	Omiya Ardija	Yamagata Park Stadium
JST (UTC+09)

23 May 2001 13	Mito HollyHock	0-2	Omiya Ardija	Hitachinaka City Stadium
JST (UTC+09)

26 May 2001 14	Omiya Ardija	3-0	Sagan Tosu	Omiya Football Stadium
JST (UTC+09)

16 June 2001 15	Kyoto Purple Sanga	1-3	Omiya Ardija	Tottori Soccer Stadium
JST (UTC+09)

24 June 2001 16	Omiya Ardija	3-0	Shonan Bellmare	Omiya Football Stadium
JST (UTC+09)

29 June 2001 17	Vegalta Sendai	0-1 (GG) (a.e.t.)	Omiya Ardija	Sendai Stadium
JST (UTC+09)

7 July 2001 18	Omiya Ardija	2-1	Albirex Niigata	Omiya Football Stadium
JST (UTC+09)

11 July 2001 19	Kawasaki Frontale	2-3 (GG) (a.e.t.)	Omiya Ardija	Todoroki Athletics Stadium
JST (UTC+09)

15 July 2001 20	Omiya Ardija	1-0	Oita Trinita	Omiya Football Stadium
JST (UTC+09)

21 July 2001 21	Omiya Ardija	2-0	Yokohama FC	Omiya Football Stadium
JST (UTC+09)

25 July 2001 22	Ventforet Kofu	0-2	Omiya Ardija	Kose Sports Park Stadium
JST (UTC+09)

28 July 2001 23	Omiya Ardija	1-1 (GG) (a.e.t.)	Vegalta Sendai	Konosu Stadium
JST (UTC+09)

3 August 2001 24	Omiya Ardija	4-1	Mito HollyHock	Omiya Football Stadium
JST (UTC+09)

11 August 2001 25	Albirex Niigata	1-0 (GG) (a.e.t.)	Omiya Ardija	Niigata Stadium
JST (UTC+09)

14 August 2001 26	Omiya Ardija	0-1	Kawasaki Frontale	Omiya Football Stadium
JST (UTC+09)

19 August 2001 27	Sagan Tosu	2-1	Omiya Ardija	Tosu Stadium
JST (UTC+09)

25 August 2001 28	Omiya Ardija	0-1	Kyoto Purple Sanga	Omiya Football Stadium
JST (UTC+09)

1 September 2001 29	Yokohama FC	1-3	Omiya Ardija	Yokohama Mitsuzawa Stadium
JST (UTC+09)

5 September 2001 30	Omiya Ardija	1-2	Ventforet Kofu	Omiya Football Stadium
JST (UTC+09)

8 September 2001 31	Shonan Bellmare	2-1	Omiya Ardija	Hiratsuka Athletics Stadium
JST (UTC+09)

15 September 2001 32	Omiya Ardija	3-0	Montedio Yamagata	Omiya Football Stadium
JST (UTC+09)

19 September 2001 33	Oita Trinita	1-2 (GG) (a.e.t.)	Omiya Ardija	Oita Athletic Stadium
JST (UTC+09)

22 September 2001 34	Omiya Ardija	0-3	Albirex Niigata	Omiya Football Stadium
JST (UTC+09)

29 September 2001 35	Kyoto Purple Sanga	0-1	Omiya Ardija	Nishikyogoku Athletic Stadium
JST (UTC+09)

6 October 2001 36	Omiya Ardija	1-0	Sagan Tosu	Omiya Football Stadium
JST (UTC+09)

13 October 2001 37	Kawasaki Frontale	1-0	Omiya Ardija	Nagano Athletic Stadium
JST (UTC+09)

17 October 2001 38	Omiya Ardija	1-2	Shonan Bellmare	Omiya Football Stadium
JST (UTC+09)

21 October 2001 39	Vegalta Sendai	1-1 (GG) (a.e.t.)	Omiya Ardija	Sendai Stadium
JST (UTC+09)

28 October 2001 40	Omiya Ardija	3-1	Oita Trinita	Omiya Football Stadium
JST (UTC+09)

3 November 2001 41	Montedio Yamagata	2-1	Omiya Ardija	Tsuruoka Komakihara Stadium
JST (UTC+09)

6 November 2001 42	Mito HollyHock	2-2 (GG) (a.e.t.)	Omiya Ardija	Kasamatsu Stadium
JST (UTC+09)

10 November 2001 43	Omiya Ardija	2-0	Yokohama FC	Omiya Football Stadium
JST (UTC+09)

18 November 2001 44	Ventforet Kofu	0-1 (GG) (a.e.t.)	Omiya Ardija	Kose Sports Park Stadium
JST (UTC+09)

=== Emperor's Cup ===
25 November 2001 1st Round	Tokai University	2-0	Omiya Ardija	Yamato Sports Center Stadium
JST (UTC+09)

=== J.League Cup ===
4 April 2001 1st Round-1	Omiya Ardija	1-1	JEF United Ichihara	Omiya Football Stadium
JST (UTC+09)

18 April 2001 1st Round-2	JEF United Ichihara	1-0 (2-1 agg.)	Omiya Ardija	Ichihara Seaside Stadium
JST (UTC+09)

== Player statistics ==
No.	Pos.	Nat.	Player	D.o.B. (Age)	Height / Weight	J.League 2		Emperor's Cup		J.League Cup		Total	
No.	Pos.	Nat.	Player	D.o.B. (Age)	Height / Weight	Apps	Goals	Apps	Goals	Apps	Goals	Apps	Goals
1	GK	(Japan)	Atsushi Shirai	April 18, 1966 (aged 34)	cm / kg	39	0						
2	DF	(Japan)	Seiichiro Okuno	July 26, 1974 (aged 26)	cm / kg	39	1						
3	DF	(Japan)	Yuji Kamimura	March 16, 1976 (aged 24)	cm / kg	30	3						
4	DF	(Brazil)	Toninho	December 21, 1977 (aged 23)	cm / kg	39	1						
5	DF	(Japan)	Ryugo Okamoto	December 5, 1973 (aged 27)	cm / kg	43	0						
6	MF	(Japan)	Masato Harasaki	August 13, 1974 (aged 26)	cm / kg	43	2						
7	MF	(Japan)	Hideyuki Ujiie	February 23, 1979 (aged 22)	cm / kg	37	0						
8	MF	(Japan)	Ken Iwase	July 8, 1975 (aged 25)	cm / kg	20	2						
9	FW	(Panama)	Jorge Dely Valdés	March 12, 1967 (aged 33)	cm / kg	18	21						
9	MF	(Japan)	Daisuke Tonoike	January 29, 1975 (aged 26)	cm / kg	12	4						
10	FW	(Brazil)	Jorginho	September 5, 1979 (aged 21)	cm / kg	14	3						
10	FW	(Panama)	Alfredo Anderson	October 31, 1978 (aged 22)	cm / kg	0	0						
11	FW	(Japan)	Kazushi Isoyama	January 8, 1975 (aged 26)	cm / kg	22	4						
12	MF	(Japan)	Daisuke Hoshi	December 10, 1980 (aged 20)	cm / kg	0	0						
13	FW	(Japan)	Koji Kanagawa	July 4, 1977 (aged 23)	cm / kg	0	0						
14	MF	(Japan)	Shinji Otsuka	December 29, 1975 (aged 25)	cm / kg	40	3						
15	MF	(Japan)	Masato Saito	December 1, 1975 (aged 25)	cm / kg	31	1						
16	MF	(Japan)	Akinori Kosaka	September 14, 1975 (aged 25)	cm / kg	23	4						
17	MF	(Japan)	Masahiro Miyashita	October 10, 1975 (aged 25)	cm / kg	13	0						
18	DF	(Japan)	Daiju Matsumoto	December 9, 1977 (aged 23)	cm / kg	12	0						
19	DF	(Japan)	Shingo Itō	April 28, 1979 (aged 21)	cm / kg	0	0						
20	GK	(Japan)	Hidetoyo Watanabe	January 19, 1971 (aged 30)	cm / kg	5	0						
21	GK	(Japan)	Hiroki Aratani	August 6, 1975 (aged 25)	cm / kg	0	0						
22	GK	(Japan)	Eiji Kawashima	March 20, 1983 (aged 17)	cm / kg	0	0						
23	DF	(Japan)	Mitsuo Tanaka	June 12, 1981 (aged 19)	cm / kg	0	0						
23	FW	(Brazil)	Alex Garcia	April 9, 1979 (aged 21)	cm / kg	0	0						
24	MF	(Japan)	Tetsuya Nishiwaki	May 22, 1977 (aged 23)	cm / kg	5	1						
25	MF	(Japan)	Yusuke Shimada	January 19, 1982 (aged 19)	cm / kg	1	0						
26	DF	(Japan)	Kosuke Kitani	October 9, 1978 (aged 22)	cm / kg	1	0						
27	FW	(Japan)	Satoshi Yokoyama	February 14, 1980 (aged 21)	cm / kg	23	4						
28	MF	(Japan)	Hiromasa Suguri	July 29, 1976 (aged 24)	cm / kg	10	0						
29	DF	(Japan)	Masahiro Ando	April 2, 1972 (aged 28)	cm / kg	44	5						
30	FW	(Brazil)	Baré	January 18, 1982 (aged 19)	cm / kg	30	13						

== Other pages ==
- (in Japanese) J. League official site
