= 1999 Omiya Ardija season =

Omiya Ardija
1999 season
- Manager: Pim Verbeek
- Stadium: Omiya Football Stadium
- J.League 2: 6th
- Emperor's Cup: 3rd Round
- J.League Cup: 1st Round
- Top goalscorer: Jeroen Boere (9)
| Home colours | Away colours |

1999 Omiya Ardija season

== Competitions ==
| Competitions | Position |
|---|---|
| J.League 2 | 6th / 10 clubs |
| Emperor's Cup | 3rd round |
| J.League Cup | 1st round |

== Domestic results ==
=== J.League 2 ===
| 14 March 1999 1 | Ventforet Kofu | 1-2 | Omiya Ardija | Nirasaki Central Park Stadium |
| JST (UTC+09) |

| 21 March 1999 2 | Omiya Ardija | 1-2 | Consadole Sapporo | Omiya Football Stadium |
| JST (UTC+09) |

| 28 March 1999 3 | Omiya Ardija | 5-0 | Oita Trinita | Omiya Football Stadium |
| JST (UTC+09) |

| 4 April 1999 4 | Sagan Tosu | 4-2 | Omiya Ardija | Tosu Stadium |
| JST (UTC+09) |

| 11 April 1999 5 | Omiya Ardija | 4-0 | Vegalta Sendai | Omiya Football Stadium |
| JST (UTC+09) |

| 18 April 1999 6 | Albirex Niigata | 3-1 | Omiya Ardija | Niigata City Athletic Stadium |
| JST (UTC+09) |

| 25 April 1999 7 | Omiya Ardija | 0-2 | Kawasaki Frontale | Omiya Football Stadium |
| JST (UTC+09) |

| 29 April 1999 8 | Montedio Yamagata | 1-2 | Omiya Ardija | Yamagata Park Stadium |
| JST (UTC+09) |

| 2 May 1999 9 | Omiya Ardija | 0-2 | FC Tokyo | Omiya Football Stadium |
| JST (UTC+09) |

| 5 May 1999 10 | Consadole Sapporo | 1-0 | Omiya Ardija | Sapporo Atsubetsu Park Stadium |
| JST (UTC+09) |

| 9 May 1999 11 | Oita Trinita | 1-0 | Omiya Ardija | Oita Athletic Stadium |
| JST (UTC+09) |

| 16 May 1999 12 | Omiya Ardija | 4-1 | Sagan Tosu | Omiya Football Stadium |
| JST (UTC+09) |

| 23 May 1999 13 | Vegalta Sendai | 0-1 (GG) (a.e.t.) | Omiya Ardija | Sendai Stadium |
| JST (UTC+09) |

| 29 May 1999 14 | Omiya Ardija | 1-0 | Albirex Niigata | Omiya Football Stadium |
| JST (UTC+09) |

| 27 June 1999 15 | Kawasaki Frontale | 2-1 (GG) (a.e.t.) | Omiya Ardija | Todoroki Athletics Stadium |
| JST (UTC+09) |

| 4 July 1999 16 | Omiya Ardija | 1-0 (GG) (a.e.t.) | Montedio Yamagata | Omiya Football Stadium |
| JST (UTC+09) |

| 10 July 1999 17 | FC Tokyo | 2-0 | Omiya Ardija | Edogawa Stadium |
| JST (UTC+09) |

| 17 July 1999 18 | Omiya Ardija | 1-1 (GG) (a.e.t.) | Ventforet Kofu | Konosu Stadium |
| JST (UTC+09) |

| 30 July 1999 19 | Kawasaki Frontale | 2-1 (GG) (a.e.t.) | Omiya Ardija | International Stadium Yokohama |
| JST (UTC+09) |

| 8 August 1999 20 | Omiya Ardija | 2-0 | Ventforet Kofu | Omiya Football Stadium |
| JST (UTC+09) |

| 15 August 1999 21 | Omiya Ardija | 0-1 | Sagan Tosu | Omiya Football Stadium |
| JST (UTC+09) |

| 21 August 1999 22 | Vegalta Sendai | 2-1 | Omiya Ardija | Sendai Stadium |
| JST (UTC+09) |

| 29 August 1999 23 | Omiya Ardija | 3-1 | Albirex Niigata | Omiya Football Stadium |
| JST (UTC+09) |

| 5 September 1999 24 | Oita Trinita | 5-0 | Omiya Ardija | Oita Athletic Stadium |
| JST (UTC+09) |

| 12 September 1999 25 | Omiya Ardija | 1-2 | Montedio Yamagata | Omiya Football Stadium |
| JST (UTC+09) |

| 15 September 1999 26 | FC Tokyo | 1-0 | Omiya Ardija | Nishigaoka Soccer Stadium |
| JST (UTC+09) |

| 19 September 1999 27 | Omiya Ardija | 1-0 | Consadole Sapporo | Omiya Football Stadium |
| JST (UTC+09) |

| 26 September 1999 28 | Ventforet Kofu | 0-1 | Omiya Ardija | Kose Sports Park Stadium |
| JST (UTC+09) |

| 3 October 1999 29 | Sagan Tosu | 0-2 | Omiya Ardija | Tosu Stadium |
| JST (UTC+09) |

| 11 October 1999 30 | Omiya Ardija | 0-2 | Vegalta Sendai | Tochigi Green Stadium |
| JST (UTC+09) |

| 18 October 1999 31 | Albirex Niigata | 0-1 | Omiya Ardija | Niigata City Athletic Stadium |
| JST (UTC+09) |

| 24 October 1999 32 | Omiya Ardija | 2-3 | Oita Trinita | Omiya Football Stadium |
| JST (UTC+09) |

| 31 October 1999 33 | Montedio Yamagata | 1-2 | Omiya Ardija | Yamagata Park Stadium |
| JST (UTC+09) |

| 8 November 1999 34 | Omiya Ardija | 1-0 (GG) (a.e.t.) | FC Tokyo | Omiya Football Stadium |
| JST (UTC+09) |

| 14 November 1999 35 | Consadole Sapporo | 0-1 | Omiya Ardija | Sapporo Atsubetsu Park Stadium |
| JST (UTC+09) |

| 21 November 1999 36 | Omiya Ardija | 2-1 (GG) (a.e.t.) | Kawasaki Frontale | Omiya Football Stadium |
| JST (UTC+09) |

=== Emperor's Cup ===
| 28 November 1999 1st Round | Sakai High School | 0-6 | Omiya Ardija | Tottori Soccer Stadium |
| JST (UTC+09) |

| 5 December 1999 2nd Round | Omiya Ardija | 3-0 | Dohto University | Omiya Football Stadium |
| JST (UTC+09) |

| 12 December 1999 3rd Round | Gamba Osaka | 1-0 | Omiya Ardija | Osaka Expo '70 Stadium |
| JST (UTC+09) |

=== J.League Cup ===
| 7 April 1999 1st Round-1 | Omiya Ardija | 1-1 | Yokohama F. Marinos | Omiya Football Stadium |
| JST (UTC+09) |

| 14 April 1999 1st Round-2 | Yokohama F. Marinos | 3-0 (4-1 agg.) | Omiya Ardija | Yokohama Mitsuzawa Stadium |
| JST (UTC+09) |

== Player statistics ==
| No. | Pos. | Nat. | Player | D.o.B. (Age) | Height / Weight | J.League 2 | | Emperor's Cup | | J.League Cup | | Total | |
| No. | Pos. | Nat. | Player | D.o.B. (Age) | Height / Weight | Apps | Goals | Apps | Goals | Apps | Goals | Apps | Goals |
|---|---|---|---|---|---|---|---|---|---|---|---|---|---|
| 1 | GK | (Japan) | Atsushi Shirai | April 18, 1966 (aged 32) | cm / kg | 36 | 0 | | | | | | |
| 2 | DF | (Japan) | Seiichiro Okuno | July 26, 1974 (aged 24) | cm / kg | 27 | 2 | | | | | | |
| 3 | DF | (Netherlands) | Jan Veenhhof | January 28, 1969 (aged 30) | cm / kg | 23 | 0 | | | | | | |
| 4 | DF | (Japan) | Tetsuro Uki | October 4, 1971 (aged 27) | cm / kg | 34 | 1 | | | | | | |
| 5 | DF | (Japan) | Ryugo Okamoto | December 5, 1973 (aged 25) | cm / kg | 36 | 0 | | | | | | |
| 6 | MF | (Japan) | Masato Harasaki | August 13, 1974 (aged 24) | cm / kg | 30 | 4 | | | | | | |
| 7 | DF | (Japan) | Shokichi Sato | April 9, 1971 (aged 27) | cm / kg | 13 | 1 | | | | | | |
| 8 | MF | (Japan) | Ken Iwase | July 8, 1975 (aged 23) | cm / kg | 32 | 5 | | | | | | |
| 9 | FW | (Netherlands) | Jeroen Boere | November 18, 1967 (aged 31) | cm / kg | 11 | 9 | | | | | | |
| 10 | MF | (Cameroon) | Edwin Ifeanyi | April 28, 1972 (aged 26) | cm / kg | 10 | 0 | | | | | | |
| 10 | MF | (England) | Mark Burke | February 12, 1969 (aged 30) | cm / kg | 20 | 5 | | | | | | |
| 11 | FW | (Japan) | Taisuke Hiramoto | November 21, 1974 (aged 24) | cm / kg | 18 | 4 | | | | | | |
| 12 | FW | (Japan) | Taichi Sato | August 23, 1977 (aged 21) | cm / kg | 19 | 2 | | | | | | |
| 13 | FW | (Japan) | Kazushi Isoyama | January 8, 1975 (aged 24) | cm / kg | 29 | 7 | | | | | | |
| 14 | MF | (Japan) | Hideyuki Ujiie | February 23, 1979 (aged 20) | cm / kg | 28 | 0 | | | | | | |
| 15 | MF | (Japan) | Masato Saito | December 1, 1975 (aged 23) | cm / kg | 22 | 0 | | | | | | |
| 16 | MF | (Japan) | Akinori Kosaka | September 14, 1975 (aged 23) | cm / kg | 22 | 2 | | | | | | |
| 17 | MF | (Japan) | Masahiro Miyashita | October 10, 1975 (aged 23) | cm / kg | 14 | 1 | | | | | | |
| 18 | DF | (Japan) | Yasuhiro Toyoda | May 2, 1976 (aged 22) | cm / kg | 3 | 0 | | | | | | |
| 19 | DF | (Japan) | Yuji Kamimura | March 16, 1976 (aged 22) | cm / kg | 16 | 0 | | | | | | |
| 20 | GK | (Japan) | Hidetoyo Watanabe | January 19, 1971 (aged 28) | cm / kg | 0 | 0 | | | | | | |
| 21 | GK | (Japan) | Hiroki Aratani | August 6, 1975 (aged 23) | cm / kg | 0 | 0 | | | | | | |
| 22 | GK | (Japan) | Yoshitaka Kishikawa | January 16, 1979 (aged 20) | cm / kg | 0 | 0 | | | | | | |
| 23 | MF | (Japan) | Yuji Yokoyama | July 6, 1969 (aged 29) | cm / kg | 20 | 2 | | | | | | |
| 24 | MF | (Japan) | Kenji Kitahara | May 10, 1976 (aged 22) | cm / kg | 7 | 0 | | | | | | |
| 25 | MF | (Japan) | Shuichiro Yoshizaki | September 7, 1980 (aged 18) | cm / kg | 0 | 0 | | | | | | |
| 26 | DF | (Japan) | Kazunari Okayama | April 24, 1978 (aged 20) | cm / kg | 6 | 1 | | | | | | |

== Other pages ==
- (in Japanese) J.League official site
