= 2000 Omiya Ardija season =

Omiya Ardija
2000 season
- Manager: Toshiya Miura
- Stadium: Omiya Football Stadium
- J.League 2: 4th
- Emperor's Cup: 3rd Round
- J.League Cup: 1st Round
- Top goalscorer: Jorginho (15)
Home colours	Away colours

2000 Omiya Ardija season

== Competitions ==
Competitions	Position
J.League 2	4th / 11 clubs
Emperor's Cup	3rd round
J.League Cup	1st round

== Domestic results ==
=== J.League 2 ===
12 March 2000 1	Omiya Ardija	2-1	Albirex Niigata	Omiya Football Stadium
JST (UTC+09)

19 March 2000 2	Omiya Ardija	2-1	Vegalta Sendai	Omiya Football Stadium
JST (UTC+09)

25 March 2000 3	Urawa Red Diamonds	1-0	Omiya Ardija	Urawa Komaba Stadium
JST (UTC+09)

30 March 2000 4	Omiya Ardija	2-5	Oita Trinita	Omiya Football Stadium
JST (UTC+09)

2 April 2000 5	Montedio Yamagata	0-1	Omiya Ardija	Yamagata Park Stadium
JST (UTC+09)

9 April 2000 6	Omiya Ardija	1-0	Mito HollyHock	Omiya Football Stadium
JST (UTC+09)

16 April 2000 7	Shonan Bellmare	0-4	Omiya Ardija	Hiratsuka Athletics Stadium
JST (UTC+09)

8	bye

28 April 2000 9	Omiya Ardija	0-0 (GG) (a.e.t.)	Sagan Tosu	Omiya Football Stadium
JST (UTC+09)

4 May 2000 10	Ventforet Kofu	1-2	Omiya Ardija	Kose Sports Park Stadium
JST (UTC+09)

8 May 2000 11	Omiya Ardija	0-2	Consadole Sapporo	Omiya Football Stadium
JST (UTC+09)

13 May 2000 12	Albirex Niigata	0-2	Omiya Ardija	Niigata City Athletic Stadium
JST (UTC+09)

18 May 2000 13	Vegalta Sendai	1-2 (GG) (a.e.t.)	Omiya Ardija	Sendai Stadium
JST (UTC+09)

22 May 2000 14	Omiya Ardija	0-6	Urawa Red Diamonds	Omiya Football Stadium
JST (UTC+09)

25 May 2000 15	Oita Trinita	2-1	Omiya Ardija	Oita Athletic Stadium
JST (UTC+09)

1 June 2000 16	Omiya Ardija	3-0	Montedio Yamagata	Omiya Football Stadium
JST (UTC+09)

4 June 2000 17	Mito HollyHock	0-2	Omiya Ardija	Hitachi Athletic Stadium
JST (UTC+09)

10 June 2000 18	Omiya Ardija	4-1	Shonan Bellmare	Omiya Football Stadium
JST (UTC+09)

19	bye

21 June 2000 20	Sagan Tosu	3-0	Omiya Ardija	Saga Stadium
JST (UTC+09)

25 June 2000 21	Omiya Ardija	1-0	Ventforet Kofu	Omiya Football Stadium
JST (UTC+09)

2 July 2000 22	Consadole Sapporo	2-1	Omiya Ardija	Sapporo Atsubetsu Park Stadium
JST (UTC+09)

9 July 2000 23	Omiya Ardija	0-1	Oita Trinita	Omiya Football Stadium
JST (UTC+09)

22 July 2000 24	Montedio Yamagata	2-1	Omiya Ardija	Yamagata City Athletic Stadium
JST (UTC+09)

28 July 2000 25	Omiya Ardija	3-1	Mito HollyHock	Konosu Stadium
JST (UTC+09)

2 August 2000 26	Shonan Bellmare	1-2	Omiya Ardija	Hiratsuka Athletics Stadium
JST (UTC+09)

27	bye

12 August 2000 28	Omiya Ardija	1-0	Sagan Tosu	Omiya Football Stadium
JST (UTC+09)

19 August 2000 29	Ventforet Kofu	1-2 (GG) (a.e.t.)	Omiya Ardija	Kose Sports Park Stadium
JST (UTC+09)

26 August 2000 30	Omiya Ardija	0-2	Consadole Sapporo	Omiya Football Stadium
JST (UTC+09)

2 September 2000 31	Albirex Niigata	1-2	Omiya Ardija	Niigata City Athletic Stadium
JST (UTC+09)

9 September 2000 32	Omiya Ardija	2-3 (GG) (a.e.t.)	Vegalta Sendai	Omiya Football Stadium
JST (UTC+09)

16 September 2000 33	Urawa Red Diamonds	0-1	Omiya Ardija	Urawa Komaba Stadium
JST (UTC+09)

23 September 2000 34	Omiya Ardija	2-1	Montedio Yamagata	Omiya Football Stadium
JST (UTC+09)

28 September 2000 35	Mito HollyHock	2-1 (GG) (a.e.t.)	Omiya Ardija	Tochigi Green Stadium
JST (UTC+09)

1 October 2000 36	Omiya Ardija	1-2	Shonan Bellmare	Nishigaoka Soccer Stadium
JST (UTC+09)

37	bye

14 October 2000 38	Sagan Tosu	1-2	Omiya Ardija	Nagasaki Athletic Stadium
JST (UTC+09)

22 October 2000 39	Omiya Ardija	1-0	Ventforet Kofu	Omiya Football Stadium
JST (UTC+09)

29 October 2000 40	Consadole Sapporo	2-0	Omiya Ardija	Sapporo Atsubetsu Park Stadium
JST (UTC+09)

5 November 2000 41	Omiya Ardija	2-1	Albirex Niigata	Omiya Football Stadium
JST (UTC+09)

12 November 2000 42	Vegalta Sendai	0-2	Omiya Ardija	Sendai Stadium
JST (UTC+09)

16 November 2000 43	Omiya Ardija	0-1	Urawa Red Diamonds	Omiya Football Stadium
JST (UTC+09)

19 November 2000 44	Oita Trinita	1-0	Omiya Ardija	Oita Athletic Stadium
JST (UTC+09)

=== Emperor's Cup ===
25 November 2000 1st Round	S.C. Tottori	0-3	Omiya Ardija	Tottori Soccer Stadium
JST (UTC+09)

3 December 2000 2nd Round	Omiya Ardija	4-1	Tokuyama University	Konosu Stadium
JST (UTC+09)

10 December 2000 3rd Round	Avispa Fukuoka	4-2	Omiya Ardija	Hakatanomori Football Stadium
JST (UTC+09)

=== J.League Cup ===
12 April 2000 1st Round-1	Omiya Ardija	0-4	Vissel Kobe	Omiya Football Stadium
JST (UTC+09)

19 April 2000 1st Round-2	Vissel Kobe	2-0 (6-0 agg.)	Omiya Ardija	Kobe Universiade Memorial Stadium
JST (UTC+09)

== Player statistics ==
No.	Pos.	Nat.	Player	D.o.B. (Age)	Height / Weight	J.League 2		Emperor's Cup		J.League Cup		Total	
No.	Pos.	Nat.	Player	D.o.B. (Age)	Height / Weight	Apps	Goals	Apps	Goals	Apps	Goals	Apps	Goals
1	GK	(Japan)	Atsushi Shirai	April 18, 1966 (aged 33)	cm / kg	38	0						
2	DF	(Japan)	Seiichiro Okuno	July 26, 1974 (aged 25)	cm / kg	34	1						
3	DF	(Netherlands)	Jan Veenhhof	January 28, 1969 (aged 31)	cm / kg	30	0						
4	DF	(Japan)	Tetsuro Uki	October 4, 1971 (aged 28)	cm / kg	38	1						
5	DF	(Japan)	Ryugo Okamoto	December 5, 1973 (aged 26)	cm / kg	40	0						
6	MF	(Japan)	Masato Harasaki	August 13, 1974 (aged 25)	cm / kg	39	9						
7	MF	(Japan)	Hideyuki Ujiie	February 23, 1979 (aged 21)	cm / kg	32	0						
8	MF	(Japan)	Ken Iwase	July 8, 1975 (aged 24)	cm / kg	6	0						
9	FW	(Japan)	Koji Noguchi	June 5, 1970 (aged 29)	cm / kg	31	5						
10	MF	(England)	Mark Burke	February 12, 1969 (aged 31)	cm / kg	31	4						
11	FW	(Japan)	Kazushi Isoyama	January 8, 1975 (aged 25)	cm / kg	31	8						
12	FW	(Japan)	Taichi Sato	August 23, 1977 (aged 22)	cm / kg	7	1						
13	MF	(Japan)	Yusuke Sato	November 2, 1977 (aged 22)	cm / kg	11	0						
14	MF	(Japan)	Yuji Yokoyama	July 6, 1969 (aged 30)	cm / kg	14	0						
15	MF	(Japan)	Masato Saito	December 1, 1975 (aged 24)	cm / kg	24	2						
16	MF	(Japan)	Akinori Kosaka	September 14, 1975 (aged 24)	cm / kg	21	2						
17	MF	(Japan)	Masahiro Miyashita	October 10, 1975 (aged 24)	cm / kg	18	1						
18	DF	(Japan)	Daiju Matsumoto	December 9, 1977 (aged 22)	cm / kg	3	0						
19	DF	(Japan)	Yuji Kamimura	March 16, 1976 (aged 23)	cm / kg	34	4						
20	GK	(Japan)	Hidetoyo Watanabe	January 19, 1971 (aged 29)	cm / kg	3	0						
21	GK	(Japan)	Hiroki Aratani	August 6, 1975 (aged 24)	cm / kg	0	0						
22	GK	(Japan)	Yoshihito Suzuki	July 11, 1980 (aged 19)	cm / kg	0	0						
23	FW	(Japan)	Koji Kanagawa	July 4, 1977 (aged 22)	cm / kg	0	0						
24	MF	(Japan)	Tetsuya Nishiwaki	May 22, 1977 (aged 22)	cm / kg	2	0						
25	MF	(Japan)	Yusuke Shimada	January 19, 1982 (aged 18)	cm / kg	0	0						
26	DF	(Japan)	Toshimi Kikuchi	June 17, 1973 (aged 26)	cm / kg	11	0						
26	MF	(Japan)	Daisuke Hoshi	December 10, 1980 (aged 19)	cm / kg	5	0						
27	FW	(Brazil)	Jorginho	September 5, 1979 (aged 20)	cm / kg	32	15						
28	DF	(Japan)	Mitsuo Tanaka	June 12, 1981 (aged 18)	cm / kg	0	0						
