= 2003 Omiya Ardija season =

Omiya Ardija
2003 season
- Manager: Masaaki Kanno; Eijun Kiyokumo
- Stadium: Omiya Football Stadium
- J.League 2: 6th
- Emperor's Cup: 3rd Round
- Top goalscorer: Baré (22)
Home colours	Away colours

The 2003 season of the Japanese football team Omiya Ardija.

== Competitions ==
Competitions	Position
J.League 2	6th / 12 clubs
Emperor's Cup	3rd round

== Domestic results ==
=== J.League 2 ===
Match	Date	Venue	Opponents	Score
1	2003.3.16	Saitama Stadium 2002	Albirex Niigata	1-4
2	2003.3.22	Mitsuzawa Stadium	Yokohama FC	1-0
3	2003.3.29	Ōmiya Park Soccer Stadium	Sagan Tosu	1-0
4	2003.4.5	Hitachinaka (ja:ひたちなか市総合運動公園陸上競技場)	Mito HollyHock	2-0
5	2003.4.9	Ōmiya Park Soccer Stadium	Consadole Sapporo	1-1
6	2003.4.12	Ōmiya Park Soccer Stadium	Montedio Yamagata	2-1
7	2003.4.19	Hakatanomori Athletic Stadium	Avispa Fukuoka	1-0
8	2003.4.26	Ōmiya Park Soccer Stadium	Ventforet Kofu	0-3
9	2003.4.29	Todoroki Athletics Stadium	Kawasaki Frontale	1-1
10	2003.5.4	Ōmiya Park Soccer Stadium	Shonan Bellmare	0-0
11	2003.5.10	Hiroshima Stadium	Sanfrecce Hiroshima	1-2
12	2003.5.14	Niigata City Athletic Stadium	Albirex Niigata	0-4
13	2003.5.18	Ōmiya Park Soccer Stadium	Yokohama FC	0-2
14	2003.5.24	Tosu Stadium	Sagan Tosu	2-3
15	2003.5.31	Ōmiya Park Soccer Stadium	Mito HollyHock	1-3
16	2003.6.7	Hiratsuka Athletics Stadium	Shonan Bellmare	0-0
17	2003.6.14	Ōmiya Park Soccer Stadium	Sanfrecce Hiroshima	1-1
18	2003.6.18	Kose Sports Stadium	Ventforet Kofu	2-1
19	2003.6.21	Ōmiya Park Soccer Stadium	Avispa Fukuoka	2-1
20	2003.6.28	Ōmiya Park Soccer Stadium	Montedio Yamagata	0-2
21	2003.7.2	Sapporo Dome	Consadole Sapporo	2-6
22	2003.7.6	Ōmiya Park Soccer Stadium	Kawasaki Frontale	1-0
23	2003.7.19	Hiroshima Stadium	Sanfrecce Hiroshima	2-1
24	2003.7.26	Mitsuzawa Stadium	Yokohama FC	3-0
25	2003.7.30	Ōmiya Park Soccer Stadium	Albirex Niigata	0-2
26	2003.8.2	Kasamatsu Stadium	Mito HollyHock	2-1
27	2003.8.10	Ōmiya Park Soccer Stadium	Shonan Bellmare	2-2
28	2003.8.16	Hakatanomori Athletic Stadium	Avispa Fukuoka	3-5
29	2003.8.23	Yamagata Park Stadium	Montedio Yamagata	0-1
30	2003.8.30	Ōmiya Park Soccer Stadium	Consadole Sapporo	3-0
31	2003.9.3	Ōmiya Park Soccer Stadium	Ventforet Kofu	0-0
32	2003.9.6	Todoroki Athletics Stadium	Kawasaki Frontale	1-0
33	2003.9.14	Ōmiya Park Soccer Stadium	Sagan Tosu	3-0
34	2003.9.20	Ōmiya Park Soccer Stadium	Avispa Fukuoka	0-1
35	2003.9.23	Yamagata Park Stadium	Montedio Yamagata	0-1
36	2003.9.27	Ōmiya Park Soccer Stadium	Sanfrecce Hiroshima	0-2
37	2003.10.4	Kose Sports Stadium	Ventforet Kofu	0-3
38	2003.10.11	Saitama Stadium 2002	Kawasaki Frontale	0-2
39	2003.10.17	Hiratsuka Athletics Stadium	Shonan Bellmare	0-2
40	2003.10.25	Muroran (ja:室蘭市入江運動公園陸上競技場)	Consadole Sapporo	1-0
41	2003.11.1	Ōmiya Park Soccer Stadium	Mito HollyHock	3-1
42	2003.11.9	Tosu Stadium	Sagan Tosu	4-1
43	2003.11.15	Ōmiya Park Soccer Stadium	Yokohama FC	3-0
44	2003.11.23	Niigata Stadium	Albirex Niigata	0-1

=== Emperor's Cup ===
Match	Date	Venue	Opponents	Score
1st round	2003..			-
2nd round	2003..			-
3rd round	2003..			-

== Player statistics ==
No.	Pos.	Player	D.o.B. (Age)	Height / Weight	J.League 2		Emperor's Cup		Total	
No.	Pos.	Player	D.o.B. (Age)	Height / Weight	Apps	Goals	Apps	Goals	Apps	Goals
1	GK	Tomoyasu Ando	May 23, 1974 (aged 28)	cm / kg	13	0				
2	DF	Seiichiro Okuno	July 26, 1974 (aged 28)	cm / kg	37	0				
3	DF	Hiroshi Noguchi	February 25, 1972 (aged 31)	cm / kg	24	1				
4	DF	Toninho	December 21, 1977 (aged 25)	cm / kg	38	1				
5	DF	Ryugo Okamoto	December 5, 1973 (aged 29)	cm / kg	12	0				
6	MF	Masato Harasaki	August 13, 1974 (aged 28)	cm / kg	30	0				
7	MF	Hideyuki Ujiie	February 23, 1979 (aged 24)	cm / kg	18	0				
8	DF	Masahiro Ando	April 2, 1972 (aged 30)	cm / kg	36	3				
9	FW	Finazzi	August 20, 1973 (aged 29)	cm / kg	6	1				
9	FW	Edson Araújo	July 26, 1980 (aged 22)	cm / kg	17	1				
10	FW	Hisashi Kurosaki	May 8, 1968 (aged 34)	cm / kg	25	2				
11	FW	Baré	January 18, 1982 (aged 21)	cm / kg	43	22				
12	DF	Kohei Morita	July 13, 1976 (aged 26)	cm / kg	28	2				
13	DF	Kosuke Kitani	October 9, 1978 (aged 24)	cm / kg	25	2				
14	MF	Shinji Otsuka	December 29, 1975 (aged 27)	cm / kg	23	1				
15	MF	Masato Saito	December 1, 1975 (aged 27)	cm / kg	36	2				
16	MF	Yoshiya Takemura	December 6, 1973 (aged 29)	cm / kg	4	0				
17	MF	Yusuke Shimada	January 19, 1982 (aged 21)	cm / kg	25	2				
18	DF	Daiju Matsumoto	December 9, 1977 (aged 25)	cm / kg	12	0				
19	MF	Akira Ito	September 19, 1972 (aged 30)	cm / kg	38	7				
20	GK	Hiroki Aratani	August 6, 1975 (aged 27)	cm / kg	0	0				
21	GK	Eiji Kawashima	March 20, 1983 (aged 19)	cm / kg	33	0				
23	MF	Shin Kanazawa	September 9, 1983 (aged 19)	cm / kg	7	0				
24	MF	Satoshi Kimura	October 6, 1983 (aged 19)	cm / kg	0	0				
25	MF	Yusuke Tanno	June 17, 1983 (aged 19)	cm / kg	0	0				
26	MF	Jun Marques Davidson	June 7, 1983 (aged 19)	cm / kg	7	0				
27	FW	Satoshi Yokoyama	February 14, 1980 (aged 23)	cm / kg	19	3				
28	DF	Masateru Tsujita	August 3, 1984 (aged 18)	cm / kg	0	0				
29	MF	Takamichi Seki	January 16, 1981 (aged 22)	cm / kg	0	0				
30	FW	Kazushi Isoyama	January 8, 1975 (aged 28)	cm / kg	14	1				
31	MF	Shota Suzuki	July 3, 1984 (aged 18)	cm / kg	12	0				
32	FW	Tomoya Osawa	October 22, 1984 (aged 18)	cm / kg	1	0				
33	DF	Tatsuya Murata	August 8, 1972 (aged 30)	cm / kg	22	0				

== Other pages ==
- (in Japanese) J. League official site
