= Gondo (surname) =

Gondo is a surname. Notable people with the surname include:

- Cedric Gondo (born 1996), Ivorian professional footballer
- Glen Gondo (1948 – 2024), American businessman, restaurateur and cultural advocate
- Hiroshi Gondo (born 1938), Japanese former Nippon Professional Baseball pitcher and manager
- Josiah Gondo (died 1972), Rhodesian politician
- Kohei Gondo (born 1991), Japanese badminton player
- Paula Gondo-Bredou (born 1981), Ivorian handball player
- Yusuke Gondo (born 1982), former Japanese football player

== See also ==
- Gondo (disambiguation)
