= 2002 Omiya Ardija season =

Omiya Ardija
2002 season
- Manager: Henk Duut
- Stadium: Omiya Football Stadium
- J.League 2: 6th
- Emperor's Cup: 4th Round
- Top goalscorer: Jorge Dely Valdés (13)
Home colours	Away colours

2002 Omiya Ardija season

== Competitions ==
Competitions	Position
J.League 2	6th / 12 clubs
Emperor's Cup	4th round

== Domestic results ==
=== J.League 2 ===
Match	Date	Venue	Opponents	Score
1	2002.3.3	Ōmiya Park Soccer Stadium	Sagan Tosu	1-1
2	2002.3.9	Todoroki Athletics Stadium	Kawasaki Frontale	0-2
3	2002.3.16	Ōmiya Park Soccer Stadium	Yokohama FC	1-0
5	2002.3.24	Ōmiya Park Soccer Stadium	Avispa Fukuoka	2-0
4	2002.3.27	Hitachinaka (ja:ひたちなか市総合運動公園陸上競技場)	Mito HollyHock	0-1
6	2002.3.30	Kose Sports Stadium	Ventforet Kofu	0-1
7	2002.4.6	Ōita Stadium	Oita Trinita	3-2
8	2002.4.10	Ōmiya Park Soccer Stadium	Albirex Niigata	4-1
9	2002.4.13	Yamagata Park Stadium	Montedio Yamagata	1-1
10	2002.4.20	Ōmiya Park Soccer Stadium	Cerezo Osaka	0-0
11	2002.4.24	Hiratsuka Athletics Stadium	Shonan Bellmare	0-0
12	2002.4.27	Ōmiya Park Soccer Stadium	Kawasaki Frontale	0-0
13	2002.5.3	Ōmiya Park Soccer Stadium	Mito HollyHock	2-0
14	2002.5.6	Hakata no mori stadium	Avispa Fukuoka	0-1
15	2002.5.11	Ōmiya Park Soccer Stadium	Ventforet Kofu	3-1
16	2002.7.6	Ōmiya Park Soccer Stadium	Oita Trinita	0-1
17	2002.7.10	Niigata Stadium	Albirex Niigata	2-2
18	2002.7.14	Ōmiya Park Soccer Stadium	Shonan Bellmare	0-0
19	2002.7.20	Tosu Stadium	Sagan Tosu	1-2
20	2002.7.24	Ōmiya Park Soccer Stadium	Montedio Yamagata	1-0
21	2002.7.27	Nagai Stadium	Cerezo Osaka	1-1
22	2002.8.3	Mitsuzawa (ja:横浜市Mitsuzawa Stadium公園陸上競技場)	Yokohama FC	4-1
23	2002.8.7	Ōmiya Park Soccer Stadium	Ventforet Kofu	3-0
24	2002.8.10	Hiratsuka Athletics Stadium	Shonan Bellmare	1-1
25	2002.8.16	Saitama Stadium 2002	Albirex Niigata	0-1
26	2002.8.21	Yamagata Park Stadium	Montedio Yamagata	0-0
27	2002.8.25	Todoroki Athletics Stadium	Kawasaki Frontale	2-3
28	2002.8.31	Ōmiya Park Soccer Stadium	Sagan Tosu	3-2
29	2002.9.7	Ōita Stadium	Oita Trinita	0-0
30	2002.9.11	Ōmiya Park Soccer Stadium	Cerezo Osaka	1-3
31	2002.9.14	Mito City Athletic Stadium	Mito HollyHock	1-1
32	2002.9.21	Urawa Komaba Stadium	Avispa Fukuoka	1-1
33	2002.9.25	Ōmiya Park Soccer Stadium	Yokohama FC	0-0
34	2002.9.29	Kose Sports Stadium	Ventforet Kofu	3-2
35	2002.10.6	Ōmiya Park Soccer Stadium	Montedio Yamagata	3-0
36	2002.10.9	Nagai Stadium	Cerezo Osaka	0-2
37	2002.10.12	Ōmiya Park Soccer Stadium	Mito HollyHock	2-0
38	2002.10.20	Saitama Stadium 2002	Kawasaki Frontale	1-0
39	2002.10.23	Mitsuzawa Stadium	Yokohama FC	1-1
40	2002.10.26	Hakata no mori stadium	Avispa Fukuoka	1-2
41	2002.11.2	Ōmiya Park Soccer Stadium	Oita Trinita	0-1
42	2002.11.9	Niigata City Athletic Stadium	Albirex Niigata	2-2
43	2002.11.17	Ōmiya Park Soccer Stadium	Shonan Bellmare	0-0
44	2002.11.24	Tosu Stadium	Sagan Tosu	1-2

=== Emperor's Cup ===
Match	Date	Venue	Opponents	Score
1st round	2002..			-
2nd round	2002..			-
3rd round	2002..			-
4th round	2002..			-

== Player statistics ==
No.	Pos.	Player	D.o.B. (Age)	Height / Weight	J.League 2		Emperor's Cup		Total	
No.	Pos.	Player	D.o.B. (Age)	Height / Weight	Apps	Goals	Apps	Goals	Apps	Goals
1	GK	Hidetoyo Watanabe	January 19, 1971 (aged 31)	cm / kg	2	0				
2	DF	Seiichiro Okuno	July 26, 1974 (aged 27)	cm / kg	40	1				
3	DF	Yuji Kamimura	March 16, 1976 (aged 25)	cm / kg	23	1				
4	DF	Toninho	December 21, 1977 (aged 24)	cm / kg	43	5				
5	DF	Ryugo Okamoto	December 5, 1973 (aged 28)	cm / kg	33	2				
6	MF	Masato Harasaki	August 13, 1974 (aged 27)	cm / kg	36	3				
7	MF	Hideyuki Ujiie	February 23, 1979 (aged 23)	cm / kg	31	0				
8	MF	Ken Iwase	July 8, 1975 (aged 26)	cm / kg	2	0				
9	FW	Jorge Dely Valdés	March 12, 1967 (aged 34)	cm / kg	32	13				
10	FW	Hisashi Kurosaki	May 8, 1968 (aged 33)	cm / kg	35	7				
11	FW	Kazushi Isoyama	January 8, 1975 (aged 27)	cm / kg	4	0				
11	MF	Hiromi Kojima	December 12, 1977 (aged 24)	cm / kg	11	3				
12	DF	Kohei Morita	July 13, 1976 (aged 25)	cm / kg	32	4				
13	MF	Hiromasa Suguri	July 29, 1976 (aged 25)	cm / kg	10	1				
14	MF	Shinji Otsuka	December 29, 1975 (aged 26)	cm / kg	15	1				
15	MF	Masato Saito	December 1, 1975 (aged 26)	cm / kg	35	3				
16	MF	Akinori Kosaka	September 14, 1975 (aged 26)	cm / kg	10	0				
17	MF	Yusuke Shimada	January 19, 1982 (aged 20)	cm / kg	1	0				
18	DF	Daiju Matsumoto	December 9, 1977 (aged 24)	cm / kg	33	1				
19	DF	Shingo Itō	April 28, 1979 (aged 22)	cm / kg	0	0				
20	GK	Tomoyasu Ando	May 23, 1974 (aged 27)	cm / kg	23	0				
21	GK	Hiroki Aratani	August 6, 1975 (aged 26)	cm / kg	12	0				
22	GK	Eiji Kawashima	March 20, 1983 (aged 18)	cm / kg	8	0				
23	MF	Shin Kanazawa	September 9, 1983 (aged 18)	cm / kg	28	1				
24	MF	Tetsuya Nishiwaki	May 22, 1977 (aged 24)	cm / kg	1	0				
25	MF	Yoshiya Takemura	December 6, 1973 (aged 28)	cm / kg	21	0				
26	DF	Kosuke Kitani	October 9, 1978 (aged 23)	cm / kg	2	0				
27	FW	Satoshi Yokoyama	February 14, 1980 (aged 22)	cm / kg	17	1				
28	MF	Shintaro Harada	November 8, 1980 (aged 21)	cm / kg	2	0				
29	MF	Akira Ito	September 19, 1972 (aged 29)	cm / kg	43	4				
30	FW	Jorginho	September 5, 1979 (aged 22)	cm / kg	3	0				
30	MF	Fuat Usta	July 3, 1972 (aged 29)	cm / kg	16	0				
31	MF	Satoshi Kimura	October 6, 1983 (aged 18)	cm / kg	0	0				
32	MF	Yusuke Tanno	June 17, 1983 (aged 18)	cm / kg	0	0				
33	GK	Atsushi Shirai	April 18, 1966 (aged 35)	cm / kg	0	0				
34	MF	Jun Marques Davidson	June 7, 1983 (aged 18)	cm / kg	0	0				

== Other pages ==
- (in Japanese) J. League official site
