= Miyashita =

Miyashita (written: 宮下) is a Japanese surname. Notable people with the surname include:

- Eiji Miyashita (宮下 栄治; born 1978), Japanese voice actor
- Haruka Miyashita (宮下 遥; born 1994), Japanese volleyball player
- Hidehiro Miyashita (宮下 秀洋; 1913–1976), Japanese Go player
- Ichiro Miyashita (宮下 一郎; born 1958), Japanese politician
- Junichi Miyashita (宮下 純一; born 1983), Japanese swimmer
- Junko Miyashita (宮下 順子; born 1949), Japanese actress
- Kazuhiro Miyashita (宮下 和広; born 1961), Japanese handball player
- Kiho Miyashita (宮下 希保; born 1998), Japanese women's basketball player
- Masahiro Miyashita (宮下 真洋; born 1975), Japanese footballer
- Miyo Miyashita (宮下 美代; born 1931), Japanese hurdler
- Sōichirō Miyashita (宮下 宗一郎; born 1974), Japanese politician and governor of Aomori Prefecture
- Tomomi Miyashita (宮下 ともみ; born 1982), Japanese actress
- Yuya Miyashita (宮下 雄也; born 1985), Japanese singer and actor

== See also ==
- Miyashita Park, a park in Shibuya, Tokyo, Japan
- Miyashita Dam, a dam in Fukushima Prefecture, Japan
