= Gondo =

Gondo may refer to:

- Gondo (Switzerland), a village in the municipality of Zwischbergen, Valais
- the Gondo, a Malian variant of the Dongola horse
- Gondō Station, a railway station in Nagano, Japan
- Gondo (surname), a surname
- Gondo Widjojo (1946 – 1992), tennis player from Indonesia
