= Hideyuki Ujiie =

Japanese footballer

Hideyuki Ujiie 氏家 英行
Personal information
- Full name: Hideyuki Ujiie
- Date of birth: February 23, 1979 (age 47)
- Place of birth: Tokyo, Japan
- Height: 1.79 m (5 ft 10 1/2 in)
- Position: Midfielder

Youth career
- 1994–1996: Yokohama Flügels

Senior career*
Years	Team	Apps	(Gls)
1998	Yokohama Flügels	9	(1)
1999–2004	Omiya Ardija	163	(0)
2005	Thespa Kusatsu	26	(0)
2006–2014	Tonan Maebashi		
Total		198	(1)

International career
1999	Japan U-20	1	(0)
Medal record
Yokohama Flügels
Winner	Emperor's Cup	1998
Representing Japan
FIFA U-20 World Cup
Silver medal – second place	1999 Nigeria
- * Club domestic league appearances and goals

Hideyuki Ujiie (氏家 英行, Ujiie Hideyuki; born February 23, 1979) is a former Japanese football player.

== Club career ==
Ujiie was born in Tokyo on February 23, 1979. He played for Yokohama Flügels youth team until 1996. Through trainee for 1 season, he joined top team in 1998. Although he was originally forward, he was converted to defensive midfielder by manager Carles Rexach. However the club was disbanded end of 1998 season due to financial strain, he moved to J2 League club Omiya Ardija. he played as regular player as defensive midfielder. However his opportunity to play decreased from 2003. In 2005, he moved to Thespa Kusatsu was newly promoted to J2 League. However he left the club end of 2005 season, due to financial strain of the club. He joined Tonan SC Gunma (later Tonan Maebashi) in May 2006. He retired end of 2014 season.

== National team career ==
In April 1999, he was selected Japan U-20 national team for 1999 World Youth Championship. At this tournament, he played 1 match in the final match instead of Shinji Ono was suspended. Japan won the 2nd place.

== Career statistics ==
Appearances and goals by club, season and competition
Club	Season	League			Emperor's Cup		J.League Cup		Total	
Club	Season	Division	Apps	Goals	Apps	Goals	Apps	Goals	Apps	Goals
Yokohama Flügels	1998	J1 League	9	1	0	0	1	0	10	1
Omiya Ardija	1999	J2 League	28	0	3	1	0	0	31	1
Omiya Ardija	2000	J2 League	32	0	2	0	2	0	36	0
Omiya Ardija	2001	J2 League	37	0	1	0	2	0	40	0
Omiya Ardija	2002	J2 League	31	0	2	0	—		33	0
Omiya Ardija	2003	J2 League	18	0	3	0	—		21	0
Omiya Ardija	2004	J2 League	17	0	1	0	—		18	0
Thespa Kusatsu	2005	J2 League	26	0	1	0	—		27	0
Tonan SC Gunma	2006	Prefectural Leagues	18	12	—		—		18	12
Tonan SC Gunma	2007	Prefectural Leagues			1	0	—			
Tonan Maebashi	2008	Prefectural Leagues			—		—			
Tonan Maebashi	2009	Regional Leagues	14	4	—		—		14	4
Tonan Maebashi	2010	Regional Leagues	14	2	—		—		14	2
Tonan Maebashi	2011	Regional Leagues			—		—			
Tonan Maebashi	2012	Regional Leagues			2	1	—			
Tonan Maebashi	2013	Regional Leagues			—		—			
Tonan Maebashi	2014	Regional Leagues			—		—			
Career total			244	19	16	2	5	0	265	21

== Honors and awards ==
- FIFA World Youth Championship Runner-up - 1999
