= Tetsuro Uki =

Japanese footballer and manager

Tetsuro Uki 浮氣 哲郎
Personal information
- Full name: Tetsuro Uki
- Date of birth: October 4, 1971 (age 55)
- Place of birth: Matsudo, Chiba, Japan
- Height: 1.77 m (5 ft 10 in)
- Positions: Midfielder; defender

Youth career
- 1987–1989: Senshu University Matsudo High School
- 1990–1993: Tokyo Gakugei University

Senior career*
Years	Team	Apps	(Gls)
1994–1996	Tokyo Gas	80	(5)
1997	JEF United Ichihara	5	(0)
1998	Tokyo Gas	27	(0)
1999–2000	Omiya Ardija	72	(2)
2001	Montedio Yamagata	39	(0)
2002–2003	Oita Trinita	49	(0)
2004–2005	Shonan Bellmare	53	(1)
2005	Yokohama FC	12	(0)
2006–2007	FC Kariya	42	(0)
Total		379	(8)

Managerial career
- 2007–2009: FC Kariya
- 2017–2018: Kataller Toyama
- 2023–2025: Myanmar Women
- 2026: Yangon United
- * Club domestic league appearances and goals

Tetsuro Uki (浮氣 哲郎, Uki Tetsuro; born October 4, 1971) is a Japanese football manager and former football player.

== Playing career ==
Uki was born in Matsudo on October 4, 1971. After graduating from Tokyo Gakugei University, he joined Japan Football League club Tokyo Gas in 1994. He became a regular player as center back from first season. In 1997, he moved to J1 League club JEF United Ichihara. However he could hardly play in the match. In 1998, he returned to Tokyo Gas and the club won the champions in 1998 season. In 1999, he moved to newly was promoted to J2 League club, Omiya Ardija. Although he played as center back until July 1999, he was converted to defensive midfielder in August. In 2001, he moved to J2 club Montedio Yamagata. He played as regular defensive midfielder. In 2002, he moved to J2 club Oita Trinita. He played as regular defensive midfielder and the club won the champions in 2002 and was promoted to J1 from 2003. However he could hardly play in the match in 2003. In 2004, he moved to J2 club Shonan Bellmare. He played many matches as defensive midfielder and center back. In August 2005, he moved to J2 club Yokohama FC and played many matches as center back. In 2006, he moved to Japan Football League club FC Kariya. Although he played many matches as regular player, the club results were bad and manager Nariyasu Yasuhara was sacked in July 2007. Uki retired and became a new manager as Yasuhara successor.

== Coaching career ==
In July 2007, Uki retired from playing career at Japan Football League club FC Kariya and became a manager. Although the club results were bad and finished 16th place in 2007, the club finished at 8th place in 2008. However the club finished at 17th place in 2009 and was relegated to Regional Leagues end of 2009 season. He also resigned end of 2009 season. In 2010, he moved to FC Gifu and became a coach for top team. In 2016, he moved to Shonan Bellmare. He coached for top team and youth team until 2016. In 2017, he moved to J3 League club Kataller Toyama. Although the club finished at 8th place in 2017, the club results were bad in 2018 and he was sacked in May when the club was at bottom place of 17 clubs.

== Club statistics ==
Appearances and goals by club, season and competition
Club	Season	League			Emperor's Cup		J.League Cup		Total	
Club	Season	Division	Apps	Goals	Apps	Goals	Apps	Goals	Apps	Goals
Tokyo Gas	1994	Football League	21	2	3	0	—		24	2
Tokyo Gas	1995	Football League	30	2	1	0	—		31	2
Tokyo Gas	1996	Football League	29	1	3	0	—		32	1
Tokyo Gas	Total		80	5	7	0	0	0	87	5
JEF United Ichihara	1997	J1 League	5	0	0	0	2	0	7	0
Tokyo Gas	1998	Football League	27	0	3	0	—		30	0
Omiya Ardija	1999	J2 League	34	1	3	0	2	0	39	1
Omiya Ardija	2000	J2 League	38	1	3	3	2	0	43	4
Omiya Ardija	Total		72	2	6	3	4	0	82	5
Montedio Yamagata	2001	J2 League	39	0	3	0	2	0	44	0
Oita Trinita	2002	J2 League	42	0	4	0	—		46	0
Oita Trinita	2003	J1 League	7	0	0	0	1	0	8	0
Oita Trinita	Total		88	0	7	0	3	0	98	0
Shonan Bellmare	2004	J2 League	39	1	2	0	—		41	1
Shonan Bellmare	2005	J2 League	14	0	0	0	—		14	0
Shonan Bellmare	Total		53	1	2	0	0	0	55	1
Yokohama FC	2005	J2 League	12	0	1	0	—		13	0
FC Kariya	2006	Football League	28	0	—		—		28	0
FC Kariya	2007	Football League	14	0	0	0	—		14	0
FC Kariya	Total		54	0	1	0	0	0	55	0
Career total			379	8	26	3	9	0	414	11

== Managerial statistics ==
Team	From	To	Record				
Team	From	To	G	W	D	L	Win %
Kataller Toyama	2017	2018	42	15	8	19	35.71
Total			42	15	8	19	35.71
