= Yusuke Shimada =

Japanese footballer

Yusuke Shimada 島田 裕介
Personal information
- Full name: Yusuke Shimada
- Date of birth: 19 January 1982 (age 44)
- Place of birth: Ogose, Saitama, Japan
- Height: 1.70 m (5 ft 7 in)
- Position: Midfielder

Team information
- Current team: RB Omiya Ardija (first-team coach)

Youth career
- 1997–1999: Seibudai High School

Senior career*
Years	Team	Apps	(Gls)
2000–2007	Omiya Ardija	69	(6)
2006	→ Thespa Kusatsu (loan)	46	(9)
2008	Thespa Kusatsu	42	(5)
2009	Sagan Tosu	50	(8)
2010–2011	Tokushima Vortis	50	(6)
2012	Gangwon FC	23	(1)
Total		280	(35)
- * Club domestic league appearances and goals

Yusuke Shimada (島田 裕介, Shimada Yusuke; born 19 January 1982) is a Japanese former professional footballer who played as a midfielder. He currently serves as the first-team coach for J2 League club RB Omiya Ardija.

== Playing career ==
Shimada was born in Ogose, Saitama on 19 January 1982. After graduating from high school, he joined his local J2 League club Omiya Ardija in 2000. On 18 November 2001, he debuted as a substitute in the 60th minute of a match against Ventforet Kofu. However, he would not feature regularly in the following years. From 2003, he played many matches as a substitute, and the club was promoted to J1 League in 2005. In 2006, he moved to J2 club Thespa Kusatsu on loan. He became a regular player as an attacking midfielder. In 2007, he returned to Omiya Ardija. However, he rarely played due to being behind Chikara Fujimoto and Daigo Kobayashi in the picking order. In 2008, he moved to Thespa Kusatsu again. He played in all 42 matches as a regular player. In 2009, he moved to J2 club Sagan Tosu. He appeared in 50 matches, missing one due to suspension. In 2010, he moved to J2 club Tokushima Vortis and played often across two seasons. In 2012, he moved to South Korea and joined Gangwon FC. He retired at the end of the 2012 season.

== Career statistics ==
Appearances and goals by club, season and competition
Club	Season	League			National cup (Note: Includes Emperor's Cup, Korean FA Cup)		League cup (Note: Includes J. League Cup)		Total	
Club	Season	Division	Apps	Goals	Apps	Goals	Apps	Goals	Apps	Goals
Omiya Ardija	2000	J2 League	0	0	0	0	0	0	0	0
Omiya Ardija	2001	J2 League	1	0	1	0	0	0	2	0
Omiya Ardija	2002	J2 League	1	0	4	0	—		5	0
Omiya Ardija	2003	J2 League	25	2	2	1	—		27	3
Omiya Ardija	2004	J2 League	27	3	3	0	—		30	3
Omiya Ardija	2005	J1 League	14	1	1	0	3	0	18	1
Omiya Ardija	2007	J1 League	1	0	1	0	2	0	4	0
Omiya Ardija	Total		69	6	12	1	5	0	86	7
Thespa Kusatsu (loan)	2006	J2 League	46	9	2	0	—		48	9
Thespa Kusatsu	2008	J2 League	42	5	2	0	—		44	5
Sagan Tosu	2009	J2 League	50	8	2	0	—		52	8
Tokushima Vortis	2010	J2 League	30	4	1	0	—		31	4
Tokushima Vortis	2011	J2 League	20	2	0	0	—		20	2
Tokushima Vortis	Total		50	6	1	0	—		51	6
Gangwon FC	2012	K-League	23	1	0	0	—		23	1
Career total			280	35	19	1	5	0	304	36
