= Edson Araújo =

Brazilian footballer (born 1980)

Personal information
- Full name: Edson Araújo da Silva
- Date of birth: July 26, 1980 (age 46)
- Place of birth: São Paulo, Brazil
- Height: 1.77 m (5 ft 10 in)
- Position: Forward

Team information
- Current team: Rio Branco SC

Senior career*
Years	Team	Apps	(Gls)
1999–2002	Portuguesa (SP)		
2003	Omiya Ardija		
2004	Corinthians (SP)		
2004	Fortaleza (CE)		
2005	Atlético Mineiro (MG)		
2005	Sivasspor		
2006–2007	Santa Cruz		
2007–2008	Fortaleza (CE)		
2008	Daejeon Citizen	8	(0)
2008–2009	Emirates Club		
2010	Paysandu		
2010	Vitória das Tabocas		
2010	São José		
2011–	Rio Branco SC		
- * Club domestic league appearances and goals as of 1 October 2008

Edson Araújo da Silva (born July 26, 1980), known as Edson Araújo, is a Brazilian footballer who plays as a forward.

His previous clubs include Daejeon Citizen in South Korea, Sivasspor in Turkey, Omiya Ardija in Japan, Fortaleza Esporte Clube, Santa Cruz Futebol Clube, Clube Atlético Mineiro, Sport Club Corinthians Paulista and Associação Portuguesa de Desportos.

== Club statistics ==
Club performance			League		Cup		Total	
Season	Club	League	Apps	Goals	Apps	Goals	Apps	Goals
Japan			League		Emperor's Cup		Total	
2003	Omiya Ardija	J2 League	17	1	3	1	20	2
Total			17	1	3	1	20	2
