= Yuji Kamimura =

Japanese footballer

Yuji Kamimura 上村 祐司
Personal information
- Full name: Yuji Kamimura
- Date of birth: March 16, 1976 (age 50)
- Place of birth: Gunma, Japan
- Height: 1.73 m (5 ft 8 in)
- Position: Defender

Youth career
- 1991–1993: Maebashi Ikuei High School
- 1994–1997: Senshu University

Senior career*
Years	Team	Apps	(Gls)
1998–2002	Omiya Ardija	118	(8)
Total		118	(8)
- * Club domestic league appearances and goals

Yuji Kamimura (上村 祐司, Kamimura Yuji; born March 16, 1976) is a former Japanese football player.

== Playing career ==
Kamimura was born in Gunma Prefecture on March 16, 1976. After graduating from Senshu University, he joined Japan Football League club Omiya Ardija in 1998. He played many matches as right side back from first season and the club was promoted to J2 League from 1999. In 2000, he became a regular player. However his opportunity to play decreased in 2002 and he retired at the end of the 2002 season.

== Club statistics ==
Club performance			League		Cup		League Cup		Total	
Season	Club	League	Apps	Goals	Apps	Goals	Apps	Goals	Apps	Goals
Japan			League		Emperor's Cup		J.League Cup		Total	
1998	Omiya Ardija	Football League	15	0	3	0	-		18	0
1999	Omiya Ardija	J2 League	16	0	3	0	1	0	20	0
2000	Omiya Ardija	J2 League	34	4	3	0	0	0	37	4
2001	Omiya Ardija	J2 League	30	3	1	0	2	0	33	3
2002	Omiya Ardija	J2 League	23	1	0	0	-		23	1
Total			118	8	10	0	3	0	131	8
