= Daisuke Hoshi =

Japanese footballer

Daisuke Hoshi 星 大輔
Personal information
- Full name: Daisuke Hoshi
- Date of birth: December 10, 1980 (age 45)
- Place of birth: Machida, Tokyo, Japan
- Height: 1.70 m (5 ft 7 in)
- Position: Midfielder

Youth career
- 1996–1998: Yokohama Marinos

Senior career*
Years	Team	Apps	(Gls)
1999	Yokohama F. Marinos	0	(0)
2000–2002	FC Tokyo	9	(0)
2000–2001	→Omiya Ardija (loan)	5	(0)
2003–2004	Montedio Yamagata	77	(14)
2005–2007	Kyoto Sanga FC	64	(6)
2008–2009	Tochigi SC	5	(0)
2010–2011	FC Machida Zelvia	43	(10)
Total		203	(30)
- * Club domestic league appearances and goals

Daisuke Hoshi (星 大輔, Hoshi Daisuke; born December 10, 1980) is a former Japanese football player.

== Playing career ==
Hoshi was born in Machida on December 10, 1980. He joined J1 League club Yokohama F. Marinos from the youth team in 1999. However, he could not play at all in the match. In 2000, he moved to FC Tokyo. . In August 2000, he moved to J2 League club Omiya Ardija on loan. Although he played several matches in 2000, he could not play at all in the match in 2001. In 2002, he returned to FC Tokyo. Although he played many matches as a right midfielder in early 2002, he could hardly play in the match behind new member Naohiro Ishikawa in late 2002. In 2003, he moved to J2 club Montedio Yamagata. He became a regular player as right side midfielder. In 2005, he moved to Kyoto Purple Sanga (later Kyoto Sanga FC). He played as a regular player in 2005. However, his opportunity to play decreased for injury in 2006 and he could hardly play in the match behind new member Takaaki Tokushige in 2007. In 2008, he moved to Japan Football League (JFL) club Tochigi SC. Although the club was promoted to J2 in 2009, he could hardly play in the match for 2 seasons. In 2010, he moved to his local club FC Machida Zelvia in JFL. He played many matches in 2 seasons and the club was promoted to J2 from 2012 season. He was retired in end of 2011 season.

He was elected to the Tokyo Metropolitan Assembly in 2021 and 2025.

== Club statistics ==
Club performance			League		Cup		League Cup		Total	
Season	Club	League	Apps	Goals	Apps	Goals	Apps	Goals	Apps	Goals
Japan			League		Emperor's Cup		J.League Cup		Total	
1999	Yokohama F. Marinos	J1 League	0	0	0	0	0	0	0	0
2000	FC Tokyo	J1 League	0	0	0	0	0	0	0	0
2000	Omiya Ardija	J2 League	5	0	3	0	0	0	8	0
2001	Omiya Ardija	J2 League	0	0	0	0	0	0	0	0
2002	FC Tokyo	J1 League	9	0	0	0	5	0	14	0
2003	Montedio Yamagata	J2 League	38	9	3	1	-		41	10
2004	Montedio Yamagata	J2 League	39	5	2	0	-		41	5
2005	Kyoto Purple Sanga	J2 League	42	5	1	0	-		43	5
2006	Kyoto Purple Sanga	J1 League	19	1	0	0	2	0	21	1
2007	Kyoto Sanga FC	J2 League	3	0	1	0	-		4	0
2008	Tochigi SC	Football League	0	0	0	0	-		0	0
2009	Tochigi SC	J2 League	5	0	0	0	-		5	0
2010	FC Machida Zelvia	Football League	27	9	2	0	-		29	9
2011	FC Machida Zelvia	Football League	16	1	2	0	-		18	1
Career total			203	30	14	1	7	0	224	31
