= Masato Harasaki =

Japanese footballer

Masato Harasaki 原崎 政人
Personal information
- Full name: Masato Harasaki
- Date of birth: 13 August 1974 (age 52)
- Place of birth: Fujisaki, Aomori, Japan
- Height: 1.78 m (5 ft 10 in)
- Position: Midfielder

Team information
- Current team: ReinMeer Aomori (manager)

Youth career
- 1990–1992: Too Gijuku High School

Senior career*
Years	Team	Apps	(Gls)
1993–1998	Bellmare Hiratsuka	40	(4)
1999–2003	Omiya Ardija	178	(18)
2004	Vegalta Sendai	9	(0)
Total		227	(22)

Managerial career
- 2021–2022: Vegalta Sendai
- 2023: Omiya Ardija
- 2025–: ReinMeer Aomori
Medal record
Bellmare Hiratsuka
Winner	Emperor's Cup	1994
- * Club domestic league appearances and goals

Masato Harasaki (原崎 政人, Harasaki Masato; born August 13, 1974) is a Japanese football manager and former football player. He is currently the manager of Japan Football League club, ReinMeer Aomori.

== Playing career ==
Harasaki was born in Fujisaki, Aomori on August 13, 1974. After graduating from high school, he joined Fujita Industries (later Bellmare Hiratsuka) in 1993. He debuted in 1995 and he played many matches as defensive midfielder. In 1999, he moved to newly promoted J2 League club, Omiya Ardija. He became a regular player there also as a defensive midfielder. In 2004, he moved to Vegalta Sendai. He retired at the end of the 2004 season.

== Club statistics ==
Club performance			League		Cup		League Cup		Total	
Season	Club	League	Apps	Goals	Apps	Goals	Apps	Goals	Apps	Goals
Japan			League		Emperor's Cup		J.League Cup		Total	
1993	Fujita Industries	Football League	0	0	0	0	0	0	0	0
1994	Bellmare Hiratsuka	J1 League	0	0	0	0	0	0	0	0
1995	Bellmare Hiratsuka	J1 League	10	0	2	0	-		12	0
1996	Bellmare Hiratsuka	J1 League	17	3	0	0	7	0	24	3
1997	Bellmare Hiratsuka	J1 League	5	0	0	0	4	0	9	0
1998	Bellmare Hiratsuka	J1 League	8	1	1	0	3	0	12	1
1999	Omiya Ardija	J2 League	30	4	3	1	2	0	35	5
2000	Omiya Ardija	J2 League	39	9	3	1	2	0	44	10
2001	Omiya Ardija	J2 League	43	2	1	0	2	0	46	2
2002	Omiya Ardija	J2 League	36	3	4	0	-		40	3
2003	Omiya Ardija	J2 League	30	0	0	0	-		30	0
2004	Vegalta Sendai	J2 League	9	0	0	0	-		9	0
Total			227	22	14	2	20	0	261	24

== Managerial career ==
On 13 December 2024, Harasaki was announced as the manager of JFL club, ReinMeer Aomori from 2025 season.

== Managerial statistics ==
As of the start for 2025 season.

Team	From	To	Record				
Team	From	To	G	W	D	L	Win%
Vegalta Sendai	2021	2022	36	16	8	12	44.44
Omiya Ardija	2023		26	7	5	14	26.92
ReinMeer Aomori	2025	present	0	0	0	0	—
Total			62	23	13	26	37.10

== Honours ==
Individual

- Monthly Best coach: 2022(May)
