= Jorginho (footballer, born 1979) =

Brazilian footballer

Personal information
- Full name: Jorge Luiz de Amorim Silva
- Date of birth: 5 September 1979 (age 47)
- Place of birth: Brazil
- Height: 1.85 m (6 ft 1 in)
- Position: Striker

Team information
- Current team: Mixto (U20 coach)

Senior career*
Years	Team	Apps	(Gls)
1997–1999	Caxias		
1999–2000	Juventude		
2000–2002	Omiya Ardija	49	(18)
2002–2003	Ventforet Kofu	24	(9)

Managerial career
- 2023–: Mixto (U20)
- * Club domestic league appearances and goals

Jorge Luiz de Amorim Silva, known as Jorginho (born 5 September 1979) is a Brazilian football coach and a former player who is coaching the Under-20 squad of Mixto.

== Club statistics ==
Club performance			League		Cup		League Cup		Total	
Season	Club	League	Apps	Goals	Apps	Goals	Apps	Goals	Apps	Goals
Japan			League		Emperor's Cup		J.League Cup		Total	
2000	Omiya Ardija	J2 League	32	15	3	2	2	0	37	17
2001	Omiya Ardija	J2 League	14	3	0	0	2	1	16	4
2002	Omiya Ardija	J2 League	3	0	0	0	-		3	0
2002	Ventforet Kofu	J2 League	16	7	3	3	-		19	10
2003	Ventforet Kofu	J2 League	8	2	0	0	-		8	2
Total			73	27	6	5	4	1	83	33
