= Ryugo Okamoto =

Japanese footballer

Ryugo Okamoto 岡本 隆吾
Personal information
- Full name: Ryugo Okamoto
- Date of birth: December 5, 1973 (age 52)
- Place of birth: Kanagawa, Japan
- Height: 1.76 m (5 ft 9 1/2 in)
- Position: Defender

Youth career
- 1989–1991: Yokohama Minami High School
- 1992–1995: Nihon University

Senior career*
Years	Team	Apps	(Gls)
1996–2003	Omiya Ardija	254	(17)
Total		254	(17)
- * Club domestic league appearances and goals

Ryugo Okamoto (岡本 隆吾, Okamoto Ryūgo; born December 5, 1973) is a former Japanese football player. He is the current physical coach J2 League club of Omiya Ardija.

== Playing career ==
Okamoto was born in Kanagawa Prefecture on December 5, 1973. After graduating from Nihon University, he joined Japan Football League club NTT Kanto (later Omiya Ardija) in 1996. He became a regular player as left side back from first season. The club was promoted to J2 League from 1999. From his first season in 1996, he played in all matches until end of 2001 season except for one game for suspension in August 2001. However his opportunity to play decreased in 2003 and retired at the end of the 2003 season.

== Career statistics ==
Appearances and goals by club, season and competition
Club	Season	League			Emperor's Cup		J.League Cup		Total	
Club	Season	Division	Apps	Goals	Apps	Goals	Apps	Goals	Apps	Goals
NTT Kanto	1996	Football League	30	5	3	1	—		33	6
NTT Kanto	1997	Football League	30	8	3	0	—		33	8
Omiya Ardija	1998	Football League	30	2	3	0	—		33	2
Omiya Ardija	1999	J2 League	36	0	3	0	2	0	41	0
Omiya Ardija	2000	J2 League	40	0	3	0	2	0	45	0
Omiya Ardija	2001	J2 League	43	0	0	0	2	0	45	0
Omiya Ardija	2002	J2 League	33	2	1	0	—		34	2
Omiya Ardija	2003	J2 League	12	0	2	0	—		14	0
Career total			254	17	18	1	6	0	278	18
