= Atsushi Shirai =

Japanese footballer

Atsushi Shirai 白井 淳
Personal information
- Full name: Atsushi Shirai
- Date of birth: April 18, 1966 (age 60)
- Place of birth: Kumamoto, Japan
- Height: 1.85 m (6 ft 1 in)
- Position: Goalkeeper

Youth career
- 1982–1984: Settsu High School
- 1985–1988: Kyoto Sangyo University

Senior career*
Years	Team	Apps	(Gls)
1989–1991	Tanabe Pharmaceutical	48	(0)
1991–1993	Toshiba	33	(0)
1994–1996	Gamba Osaka	1	(0)
1996	Consadole Sapporo	19	(0)
1997–1998	JEF United Ichihara	19	(0)
1999–2002	Omiya Ardija	113	(0)
Total		233	(0)
Medal record
JEF United Ichihara
Runner-up	J.League Cup	1998
- * Club domestic league appearances and goals

Atsushi Shirai (白井 淳, Shirai Atsushi; born April 18, 1966) is a former Japanese football player.

== Playing career ==
Shirai was born in Kumamoto Prefecture on April 18, 1966. After graduating from Kyoto Sangyo University, he joined Tanabe Pharmaceutical in 1989. He played as regular goalkeeper from first season. In 1991, he moved to Toshiba (later Consadole Sapporo). Although he played many matches until 1992, he could not play at all in the match in 1993. In 1994, he moved to Gamba Osaka. However he could hardly play in the match behind Kenji Honnami and Hayato Okanaka. In 1996, he returned to Consadole Sapporo and became a regular goalkeeper. In 1997, he moved to JEF United Ichihara. He battles with Japan national team goalkeeper Kenichi Shimokawa for regular goalkeeper. Although he played many matches in 1997, he could hardly play in the match in 1998. In 1999, he moved to Omiya Ardija. He played as regular goalkeeper in 3 season and he retired end of 2001 season. However he came back as player in March 2002 because multiple goalkeepers were injured. He did not play in the match and retired in August 2002.

== Club statistics ==
Club performance			League		Cup		League Cup		Total	
Season	Club	League	Apps	Goals	Apps	Goals	Apps	Goals	Apps	Goals
Japan			League		Emperor's Cup		J.League Cup		Total	
1989/90	Tanabe Pharmaceutical	JSL Division 2	23	0			0	0	23	0
1990/91	Tanabe Pharmaceutical	JSL Division 2	25	0			1	0	26	0
1991/92	Toshiba	JSL Division 1	16	0			0	0	16	0
1992	Toshiba	Football League	17	0			-		17	0
1993	Toshiba	Football League	0	0	0	0	-		0	0
1994	Gamba Osaka	J1 League	0	0	0	0	0	0	0	0
1995	Gamba Osaka	J1 League	1	0	0	0	-		1	0
1996	Gamba Osaka	J1 League	0	0	0	0	0	0	0	0
1996	Consadole Sapporo	Football League	19	0	0	0	-		19	0
1997	JEF United Ichihara	J1 League	17	0	0	0	1	0	18	0
1998	JEF United Ichihara	J1 League	2	0	1	0	2	0	5	0
1999	Omiya Ardija	J2 League	36	0	2	0	2	0	40	0
2000	Omiya Ardija	J2 League	38	0	3	0	1	0	42	0
2001	Omiya Ardija	J2 League	39	0	0	0	2	0	41	0
2002	Omiya Ardija	J2 League	0	0	0	0	-		0	0
Total			233	0	6	0	9	0	248	0
