= Jan Veenhof =

Dutch footballer

Jan Veenhhof
Personal information
- Full name: Jan Veenhof
- Date of birth: 28 January 1969 (age 57)
- Place of birth: Leeuwarden, Netherlands
- Height: 1.87 m (6 ft 1 1/2 in)
- Position: Defender

Senior career*
Years	Team	Apps	(Gls)
1988–1998	Groningen		
1998–2000	Omiya Ardija	68	(0)
2001–2002	Den Bosch		
2002–2003	Tirana		
2003	Toronto Lynx	19	(1)
2003–2005	Veendam		
- * Club domestic league appearances and goals

Jan Veenhof (born 28 January 1969) is a Dutch former footballer who played as a defender.

== Career ==
Born in Friesland, Veenhof began playing football with local side FC Groningen before joining clubs in Japan, Albania and Canada. After three seasons playing for Omiya Ardija in Japan, he had brief spells with FC Den Bosch and KF Tirana. Shortly after he left Albania, Veenhof signed for A-League side Toronto Lynx in 2003.

== Club statistics ==
Club performance			League		Cup		League Cup		Total	
Season	Club	League	Apps	Goals	Apps	Goals	Apps	Goals	Apps	Goals
Japan			League		Emperor's Cup		J.League Cup		Total	
1998	Omiya Ardija	Football League	15	0	0	0	-		15	0
1999	Omiya Ardija	J2 League	23	0	3	0	1	0	27	0
2000	Omiya Ardija	J2 League	30	0	0	0	2	0	32	0
Total			68	0	3	0	3	0	74	0
