= Seiichiro Okuno =

Japanese footballer

Seiichiro Okuno 奥野 誠一郎
Personal information
- Full name: Seiichiro Okuno
- Date of birth: July 26, 1974 (age 52)
- Place of birth: Sakai, Fukui, Japan
- Height: 1.81 m (5 ft 11 1/2 in)
- Position: Defender

Youth career
- 1990–1992: Maruoka High School

Senior career*
Years	Team	Apps	(Gls)
1993–1998	Yokohama Flügels	25	(0)
1998–2007	Omiya Ardija	275	(7)
Total		300	(7)
Medal record
Yokohama Flügels
Winner	Emperor's Cup	1993
Winner	Emperor's Cup	1998
Runner-up	Emperor's Cup	1997
- * Club domestic league appearances and goals

Seiichiro Okuno (奥野 誠一郎, Okuno Seiichiro; born July 26, 1974) is a former Japanese football player.

== Playing career ==
Okuno was born in Sakai on July 26, 1974. After graduating from high school, he joined Yokohama Flügels in 1993. He debuted and played many matches as center back in 1995. However he could hardly play in the match from 1996, he moved to Japan Football League club Omiya Ardija in 1998. Immediately he became a regular player as center back. The club was promoted to J2 League in 1999. In 2004, the club won the 2nd place and was promoted to J1 League from 2005. However his opportunity to play decreased from 2006 and he retired at the end of the 2007 season.

== Club statistics ==
Club performance			League		Cup		League Cup		Total	
Season	Club	League	Apps	Goals	Apps	Goals	Apps	Goals	Apps	Goals
Japan			League		Emperor's Cup		League Cup		Total	
1993	Yokohama Flügels	J1 League	0	0	0	0	0	0	0	0
1994	Yokohama Flügels	J1 League	0	0	0	0	0	0	0	0
1995	Yokohama Flügels	J1 League	16	0	0	0	-		16	0
1996	Yokohama Flügels	J1 League	0	0	0	0	0	0	0	0
1997	Yokohama Flügels	J1 League	6	0	5	1	3	0	14	1
1998	Yokohama Flügels	J1 League	3	0	0	0	0	0	3	0
1998	Omiya Ardija	Football League	10	0	3	0	-		13	0
1999	Omiya Ardija	J2 League	27	2	3	0	0	0	30	2
2000	Omiya Ardija	J2 League	34	1	3	0	0	0	37	1
2001	Omiya Ardija	J2 League	39	1	1	0	0	0	40	1
2002	Omiya Ardija	J2 League	40	1	3	0	-		43	1
2003	Omiya Ardija	J2 League	37	0	3	0	-		40	0
2004	Omiya Ardija	J2 League	44	2	1	0	-		45	2
2005	Omiya Ardija	J1 League	27	0	3	0	6	0	36	0
2006	Omiya Ardija	J1 League	11	0	1	0	1	0	13	0
2007	Omiya Ardija	J1 League	6	0	0	0	1	0	7	0
Career total			300	7	26	1	11	0	337	8
