= Toninho (footballer, born 1977) =

Brazilian footballer

Personal information
- Full name: Antonio Bezerra Brandão
- Date of birth: December 21, 1977 (age 48)
- Place of birth: Araraquara, Brazil
- Height: 1.86 m (6 ft 1 in)
- Position: Central defender

Youth career
- 1995–1996: Ferroviária

Senior career*
Years	Team	Apps	(Gls)
1996	CSA		
1996–1997	Corinthians-AL		
1997–1998	Corinthians		
1999–2000	Juventus-SP		
2001–2006	Omiya Ardija	222	(19)
2007	Paraná		
2008	Rio Claro		
2008	Caxias		
2009	Sertãozinho		
2010	União São João		
2011	ASA	28	(1)
2012	XV de Piracicaba	6	(1)
2012	Grêmio Barueri		
2012	Boa Esporte	9	(2)
- * Club domestic league appearances and goals

Antonio Bezerra Brandão or simply Toninho (born December 21, 1977), is a former Brazilian central defender. He started his football career in Brazil. Over the years played for several youth teams and then for professional clubs. These included CSA and Corinthians in Brazil.

== Club statistics ==
Club performance			League		Cup		League Cup		Total	
Season	Club	League	Apps	Goals	Apps	Goals	Apps	Goals	Apps	Goals
Japan			League		Emperor's Cup		J.League Cup		Total	
2001	Omiya Ardija	J2 League	39	1	1	0	2	0	42	1
2002	Omiya Ardija	J2 League	43	5	3	1	-		46	6
2003	Omiya Ardija	J2 League	38	1	3	0	-		41	1
2004	Omiya Ardija	J2 League	40	4	1	0	-		41	4
2005	Omiya Ardija	J1 League	31	5	2	1	6	0	39	6
2006	Omiya Ardija	J1 League	31	3	1	0	4	1	36	4
Total			222	19	11	2	12	1	245	22
