= Akinori Kosaka =

Japanese footballer

Akinori Kosaka 小阪 昭典
Personal information
- Full name: Akinori Kosaka
- Date of birth: September 14, 1975 (age 51)
- Place of birth: Fukui, Japan
- Height: 1.70 m (5 ft 7 in)
- Position: Midfielder

Youth career
- 1991–1993: Maruoka High School
- 1994–1997: Komazawa University

Senior career*
Years	Team	Apps	(Gls)
1998–2002	Omiya Ardija	99	(17)
Total		99	(17)
- * Club domestic league appearances and goals

Akinori Kosaka (小阪 昭典, Kosaka Akinori; born September 14, 1975) is a former Japanese football player.

== Playing career ==
Kosaka was born in Fukui Prefecture on September 14, 1975. After graduating from Komazawa University, he joined the Japan Football League club Omiya Ardija in 1998. He played often as a midfielder during the first season and the club was promoted to the new J2 League in 1999. However he did not play as often in 2002 and he retired at the end of the 2002 season.

== Career statistics ==
Appearances and goals by club, season and competition
Club	Season	League			Emperor's Cup		J.League Cup		Total	
Club	Season	Division	Apps	Goals	Apps	Goals	Apps	Goals	Apps	Goals
Omiya Ardija	1998	Football League	23	9	3	0	—		32	9
Omiya Ardija	1999	J2 League	22	2	3	3	1	1	26	6
Omiya Ardija	2000	J2 League	21	2	1	0	2	0	24	2
Omiya Ardija	2001	J2 League	23	4	1	0	1	0	25	4
Omiya Ardija	2002	J2 League	10	0	0	0	—		10	0
Career total			99	17	8	3	4	1	111	21
