= Kazushi Isoyama =

Japanese footballer

Kazushi Isoyama 磯山 和司
Personal information
- Full name: Kazushi Isoyama
- Date of birth: January 8, 1975 (age 51)
- Place of birth: Shimotsuma, Ibaraki, Japan
- Height: 1.85 m (6 ft 1 in)
- Position: Forward

Youth career
- 1990–1992: Shimotsuma Daiichi High School
- 1993–1996: Rissho University

Senior career*
Years	Team	Apps	(Gls)
1997	Brummell Sendai	1	(0)
1997–1998	Otsuka Pharmaceutical	35	(18)
1999–2003	Omiya Ardija	100	(20)
2002	→Consadole Sapporo (loan)	5	(0)
2004–2005	Mito HollyHock	73	(6)
2006–2007	Arte Takasaki	35	(0)
Total		249	(44)
- * Club domestic league appearances and goals

Kazushi Isoyama (磯山 和司, Isoyama Kazushi; born January 8, 1975) is a former Japanese football player.

== Playing career ==
Isoyama was born in Shimotsuma on January 8, 1975. After graduating from Rissho University, he joined the Japan Football League (JFL) club Brummell Sendai in 1997. However, he did not play much. In August 1997, he moved to the JFL club Otsuka Pharmaceutical. He became a regular player as a forward and scored many goals. In 1999, he moved to the newly promoted J2 League club Omiya Ardija. He played often as a regular player. However, he did not play as much in 2001. In July 2002, he moved to the J1 League club Consadole Sapporo on loan. However he did not play much there, either. In 2003, he returned to Omiya Ardija. In 2004, he moved to the J2 club Mito HollyHock. He played often over two seasons. In 2006, he moved to the Japan Football League club Arte Takasaki. He retired at the end of the 2007 season.

== Career statistics ==
Appearances and goals by club, season and competition
Club	Season	League			Emperor's Cup		J.League Cup		Total	
Club	Season	Division	Apps	Goals	Apps	Goals	Apps	Goals	Apps	Goals
Brummell Sendai	1997	Football League	1	0	0	0	—		1	0
Otsuka Pharmaceutical	1997	Football League	15	6	0	0	—		15	6
Otsuka Pharmaceutical	1998	Football League	20	12	3	3	—		23	15
Omiya Ardija	1999	J2 League	29	7	1	0	0	0	30	7
Omiya Ardija	2000	J2 League	31	8	3	3	2	0	36	11
Omiya Ardija	2001	J2 League	22	4	0	0	1	0	23	4
Omiya Ardija	2002	J2 League	4	0	0	0	—		4	0
Consadole Sapporo	2002	J1 League	5	0	0	0	—		5	0
Omiya Ardija	2003	J2 League	14	1	0	0	—		14	1
Mito HollyHock	2004	J2 League	39	3	2	2	—		41	5
Mito HollyHock	2005	J2 League	34	3	2	1	—		36	4
Arte Takasaki	2006	Football League	7	0	0	0	—		7	0
Arte Takasaki	2007	Football League	28	0	—		—		28	0
Career total			249	44	11	9	3	0	263	53
