= Shota Suzuki (footballer, born 1984) =

Japanese footballer

Shota Suzuki 鈴木 将太
Personal information
- Full name: Shota Suzuki
- Date of birth: July 3, 1984 (age 42)
- Place of birth: Yokohama, Japan
- Height: 1.71 m (5 ft 7 1/2 in)
- Position: Midfielder

Youth career
- 2000–2002: Toko Gakuen High School

Senior career*
Years	Team	Apps	(Gls)
2003–2005	Omiya Ardija	13	(0)
2006	Kashiwa Reysol	9	(1)
2007–2009	Shonan Bellmare	36	(2)
Total		58	(3)
- * Club domestic league appearances and goals

Shota Suzuki (鈴木 将太, Suzuki Shōta; born July 3, 1984) is a former Japanese football player.

== Club statistics ==
Club performance			League		Cup		League Cup		Total	
Season	Club	League	Apps	Goals	Apps	Goals	Apps	Goals	Apps	Goals
Japan			League		Emperor's Cup		J.League Cup		Total	
2003	Omiya Ardija	J2 League	12	0	0	0	-		12	0
2004	Omiya Ardija	J2 League	0	0	0	0	-		0	0
2005	Omiya Ardija	J1 League	1	0	0	0	1	0	2	0
2006	Kashiwa Reysol	J2 League	9	1	0	0	-		9	1
2007	Shonan Bellmare	J2 League	19	2	1	0	-		20	2
2008	Shonan Bellmare	J2 League	15	0	0	0	-		15	0
2009	Shonan Bellmare	J2 League	2	0	0	0	-		2	0
Career total			58	3	1	0	1	0	60	3
