= Baré (footballer) =

Brazilian footballer (born 1982)

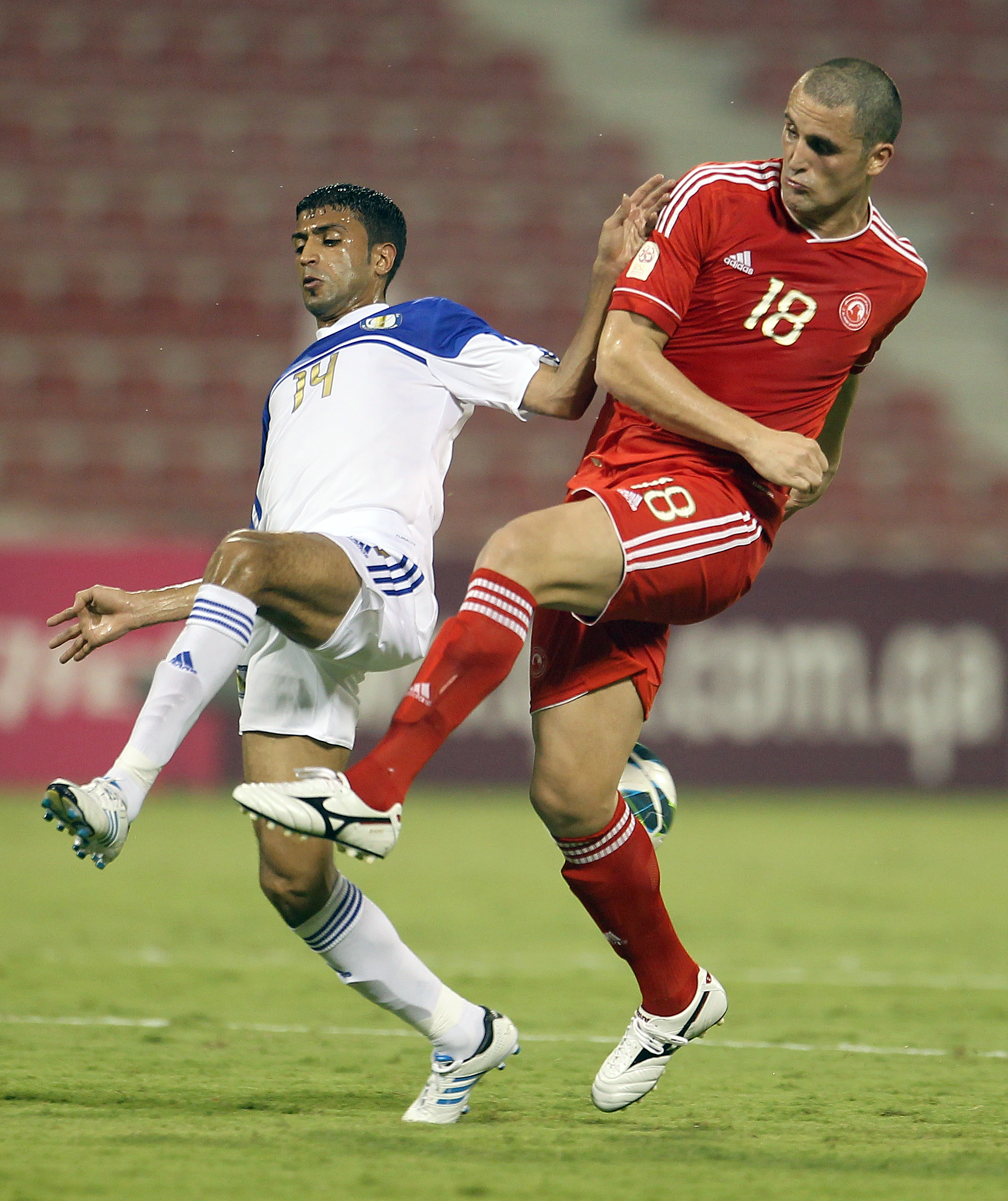
- Baré with Al-Arabi in 2012

Personal information
- Full name: Jader Volnei Spindler
- Date of birth: 18 January 1982 (age 44)
- Place of birth: Venancio Aires, Brazil
- Height: 1.91 m (6 ft 3 in)
- Position: Striker

Senior career*
Years	Team	Apps	(Gls)
1998?	Defensor Sporting		
1998?–1999?	Guarani		
2000–2001	Grêmio		
2001	Omiya Ardija		
2002	Vejle Boldklub	10	(3)
2002	Botafogo-SP		
2003	Montevideo Wanderers		
2003–2004	Omiya Ardija	84	(37)
2005–2006	Ventforet Kofu	67	(35)
2007–2008	Gamba Osaka	49	(30)
2008–2010	Al-Ahli (Dubai)	37	(22)
2010–2012	Al-Jazira (Abu Dhabi)	18	(13)
2012	→ Al Arabi (Qatar) (loan)	6	(0)
2013	Shimizu S-Pulse	16	(4)
2013–2014	Tianjin Teda	29	(6)
2015	Ventforet Kofu	22	(8)
2016	Glória		
- * Club domestic league appearances and goals as of Career End

Jader Volnei Spindler, more commonly known as Baré (born 18 January 1982), is a Brazilian former footballer who had played for clubs in the Middle East, Japan and China.

== Career ==
In 2001, he was a youth player for Gremio, when he moved to play in Japan as an underage foreigner with Omiya Ardija.

In 2007, he was playing for Gamba Osaka and was selected in the J. League Best XI for the season. In 2008, he played for them in the Pan-Pacific Championship, and scored four goals in the final against Houston Dynamo, in a 6–1 victory for Gamba.

In September 2008 it was being reported that he was set to leave Gamba to play for UAE team Al-Ahli (Dubai), for a transfer fee of 1 billion yen. Baré did subsequently make the move.

Bare won the UAE League title with Al Ahli in 2008/09, before moving to play for Al Jazira for the 2010/11 season.

He moved to Al-Arabi on loan in September 2012, from his parent club Al Jazira of Abu Dhabi.

In 2013 season, he moved back to Japan and signed a contract with Shimizu S-Pulse.

On 24 July 2013, Baré transferred to Chinese Super League side Tianjin Teda.

In February 2016 he joined Glória of Brazil, who play in the Campeonato Gaucho.

== Club statistics ==
Club performance			League		Cup		League Cup		Continental		Total	
Season	Club	League	Apps	Goals	Apps	Goals	Apps	Goals	Apps	Goals	Apps	Goals
Japan			League		Emperor's Cup		J.League Cup		Asia		Total	
2001	Omiya Ardija	J2 League	30	13	1	0	0	0	-		31	13
2003	Omiya Ardija	J2 League	43	22	3	4	-		-		46	26
2004	Omiya Ardija	J2 League	41	15	2	2	-		-		43	17
2005	Ventforet Kofu	J2 League	38	21	2	1	-		-		40	22
2006	Ventforet Kofu	J1 League	30	14	1	0	5	1	-		36	15
2007	Gamba Osaka	J1 League	31	20	4	1	7	5	-		42	26
2008	Gamba Osaka	J1 League	18	10	0	0	1	0	6	1	25	11
2013	Shimizu S-Pulse	J1 League	16	4	0	0	6	2	-		22	6
2015	Ventforet Kofu	J1 League	22	8	1	0	0	0	-		23	8
Total			269	127	14	8	19	8	6	1	308	146
