= Satoshi Yokoyama =

Japanese footballer

Satoshi Yokoyama 横山 聡
Personal information
- Full name: Satoshi Yokoyama
- Date of birth: February 14, 1980 (age 46)
- Place of birth: Hirao, Yamaguchi, Japan
- Height: 1.73 m (5 ft 8 in)
- Position: Forward

Youth career
- 1995–1997: Tatara Gakuen High School
- 1998–2000: Waseda University

Senior career*
Years	Team	Apps	(Gls)
2001–2005	Omiya Ardija	94	(12)
2006	Shonan Bellmare	36	(8)
2007–2008	Tochigi SC	53	(21)
2009–2010	Blaublitz Akita	59	(13)
Total		242	(54)
- * Club domestic league appearances and goals

Satoshi Yokoyama (横山 聡, Yokoyama Satoshi; born February 14, 1980) is a former Japanese football player.

== Playing career ==
Yokoyama was born in Hirao, Yamaguchi on February 14, 1980. After dropped out from Waseda University, he joined J2 League club Omiya Ardija in 2001. He debuted in May 2001 and play many matches as forward from summer. Although he could not become a regular, he played many matches every seasons. Ardija won the 2nd place in 2004 season and was promoted to J1 League first time in the club history. After playing in J1 in 2005 season, he moved to J2 club Shonan Bellmare in 2006. He became a regular player and scored 8 goals. In 2007, he moved to Japan Football League (JFL) club Tochigi SC. He played as regular forward and Tochigi was promoted to J2 end of 2008 season. However he left the club end of 2008 season without playing J2. In 2009, he moved to JFL club TDK (later Blaublitz Akita). He played for the club in 2 seasons and retired end of 2010 season.

== Club statistics ==
Club performance			League		Cup		League Cup		Total	
Season	Club	League	Apps	Goals	Apps	Goals	Apps	Goals	Apps	Goals
Japan			League		Emperor's Cup		J.League Cup		Total	
2001	Omiya Ardija	J2 League	23	4	1	0	0	0	24	4
2002	Omiya Ardija	J2 League	17	1	4	3	-		21	4
2003	Omiya Ardija	J2 League	19	3	0	0	-		19	3
2004	Omiya Ardija	J2 League	16	3	2	0	-		18	3
2005	Omiya Ardija	J1 League	19	1	2	0	3	1	24	2
2006	Shonan Bellmare	J2 League	36	8	2	0	-		38	8
2007	Tochigi SC	Football League	27	12	2	2	-		29	14
2008	Tochigi SC	Football League	26	9	2	0	-		28	9
2009	TDK	Football League	32	5	1	1	-		33	6
2010	Blaublitz Akita	Football League	27	8	2	2	-		29	10
Total			242	54	18	8	3	1	263	63
