= Naoki Tanaka (footballer) =

Japanese footballer

Naoki Tanaka 田中直基
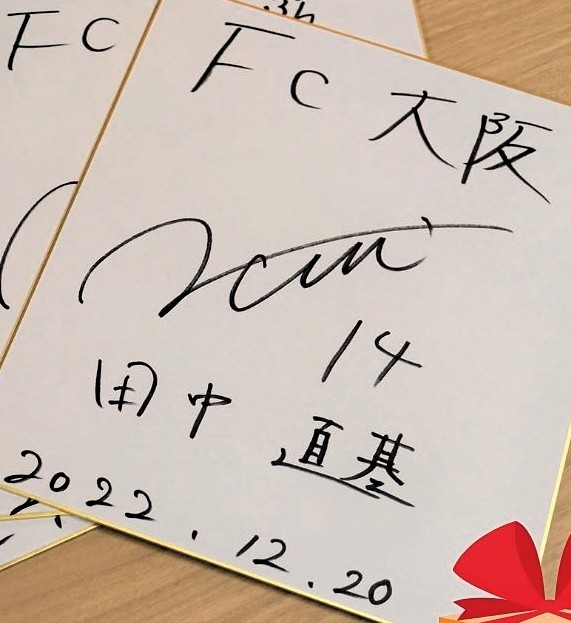

Personal information
- Full name: Naoki Tanaka
- Date of birth: March 29, 1993 (age 33)
- Place of birth: Hannan, Osaka, Japan
- Height: 1.81 m (5 ft 11 1/2 in)
- Position: Forward

Team information
- Current team: FC Osaka
- Number: 27

Youth career
- –2007: Wakayama Vivo
- 2008–2010: Kindai University High School

College career
Years	Team	Apps	(Gls)
2011–2014	Kindai University		

Senior career*
Years	Team	Apps	(Gls)
2015–2017	FC Osaka	73	(16)
2018–2020	Azul Claro Numazu	37	(3)
2020	→Blaublitz Akita (loan)	21	(3)
2021-	F.C. Osaka	29	(4)
- * Club domestic league appearances and goals as of 25 December 2021

Naoki Tanaka (田中直基, Tanaka Naoki; born March 29, 1993) is a Japanese footballer who plays for FC Osaka.

== Career ==
After attending Kindai University, Tanaka signed in 2015 with FC Osaka. After three years with the Kansai-based side, he opted to move to Azul Claro Numazu for 2018 season.

== Club statistics ==
Updated to 31 December 2020.

Club performance			League		Cup		Total	
Season	Club	League	Apps	Goals	Apps	Goals	Apps	Goals
Japan			League		Emperor's Cup		Total	
2015	FC Osaka	JFL	22	4	2	1	24	5
2016	FC Osaka	JFL	26	3	–		26	3
2017	FC Osaka	JFL	25	9	1	0	26	9
2018	Azul Claro Numazu	J3 League	16	1	–		16	1
2019	Azul Claro Numazu	J3 League	20	2	–		20	2
2020	Azul Claro Numazu	J3 League	1	0	–		1	0
2020	Blaublitz Akita	J3 League	20	3	2	0	22	3
Total			130	22	5	1	135	23

== Honours ==
Blaublitz Akita

- J3 League (1): 2020
