= Kazuma Ikarino =

Japanese footballer

Kazuma Ikarino 碇野 壱馬
Personal information
- Full name: Kazuma Ikarino
- Date of birth: May 31, 1986 (age 40)
- Place of birth: Fukuyama, Hiroshima, Japan
- Height: 1.70 m (5 ft 7 in)
- Position: Defender

Youth career
- 2002–2004: Takagawa Gakuen High School

Senior career*
Years	Team	Apps	(Gls)
2005–2007	Ohara JaSRA		
2008–2009	Nagano Parceiro	7	(0)
2010–2015	Renofa Yamaguchi	89	(10)
- * Club domestic league appearances and goals as of 23 February 2016

Kazuma Ikarino (碇野 壱馬, Ikarino Kazuma; born May 31, 1986) is a former Japanese football player.

== Playing career ==
Kazuma Ikarino played for Ohara JaSRA, AC Nagano Parceiro and Renofa Yamaguchi FC from 2005 to 2015.

== Club statistics ==
Updated to 22 February 2016.

Club performance			League		Cup		Total	
Season	Club	League	Apps	Goals	Apps	Goals	Apps	Goals
Japan			League		Emperor's Cup		Total	
2008	Nagano Parceiro	J3 League	3	0	–		3	0
2009	Nagano Parceiro	J3 League	4	0	–		4	0
2010	Renofa Yamaguchi	J3 League	18	2	2	0	20	2
2011	Renofa Yamaguchi	J3 League	17	4	1	0	18	4
2012	Renofa Yamaguchi	J3 League	18	4	–		18	4
2013	Renofa Yamaguchi	J3 League	17	0	1	0	18	0
2014	Renofa Yamaguchi	JFL	16	0	–		16	0
2015	Renofa Yamaguchi	J3 League	3	0	0	0	3	0
Total			96	10	4	0	100	10
