= Yusuke Gondo =

Japanese footballer

Yusuke Gondo 権東 勇介
Personal information
- Full name: Yusuke Gondo
- Date of birth: 7 October 1982 (age 44)
- Place of birth: Machida, Tokyo, Japan
- Height: 1.84 m (6 ft 1/2 in)
- Position: Midfielder

Youth career
- 1998–2000: Toko Gakuen High School
- 2001–2004: Dohto University

Senior career*
Years	Team	Apps	(Gls)
2004–2005	Consadole Sapporo	36	(1)
2006	Mito HollyHock	27	(0)
2007–2008	Zweigen Kanazawa	26	(9)
Total		89	(10)
- * Club domestic league appearances and goals

Yusuke Gondo (権東 勇介, Gondo Yusuke; born 7 October 1982) is a former Japanese football player.

== Club statistics ==
Club performance			League		Cup		Total	
Season	Club	League	Apps	Goals	Apps	Goals	Apps	Goals
Japan			League		Emperor's Cup		Total	
2004	Consadole Sapporo	J2 League	25	1	4	1	29	2
2005	Consadole Sapporo	J2 League	11	0	0	0	11	0
2006	Mito HollyHock	J2 League	27	0	0	0	27	0
2007	Zweigen Kanazawa	Regional Leagues	13	1	3	2	16	3
2008	Zweigen Kanazawa	Regional Leagues	13	8	2	0	15	8
Career total			89	10	9	3	98	13
