= Yamato Sports Center Stadium =

Multi-purpose athletic stadium in Japan

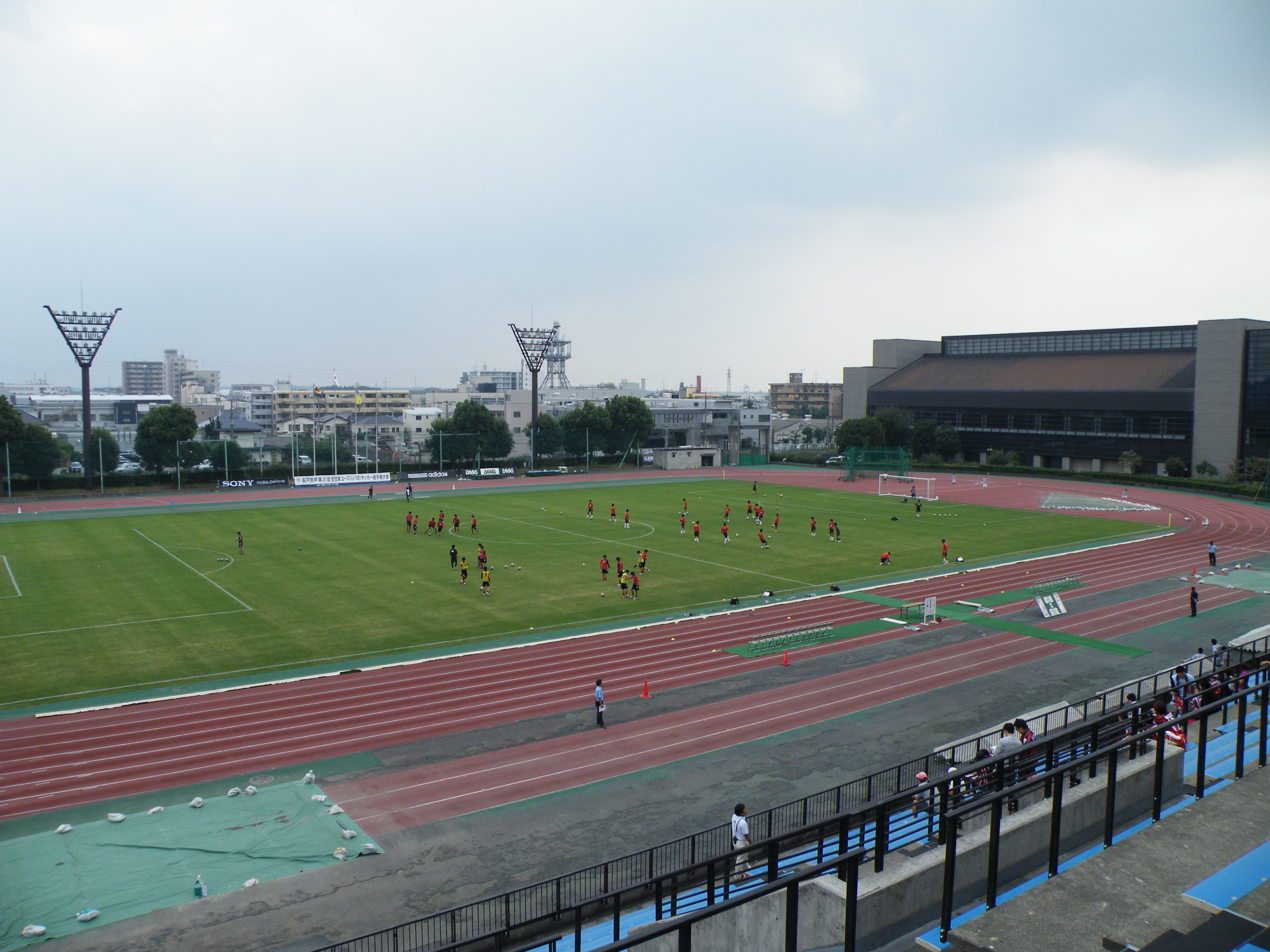
- Interactive map of Yamato Sports Center Stadium
- Location: Yamato, Kanagawa, Japan
- Coordinates: 35°28′30″N 139°27′46″E
- Owner: Yamato City
- Capacity: 2,952

Construction
- Opened: 1990

Tenant
- YSCC Yokohama

Yamato Sports Center Stadium (大和市営大和スポーツセンター競技場) is a multi-purpose athletic stadium in Yamato, Kanagawa, Japan.
