= Konosu Stadium =

Athletic stadium in Konosu, Saitama, Japan

Coordinates: 36°04′07″N 139°31′11″E

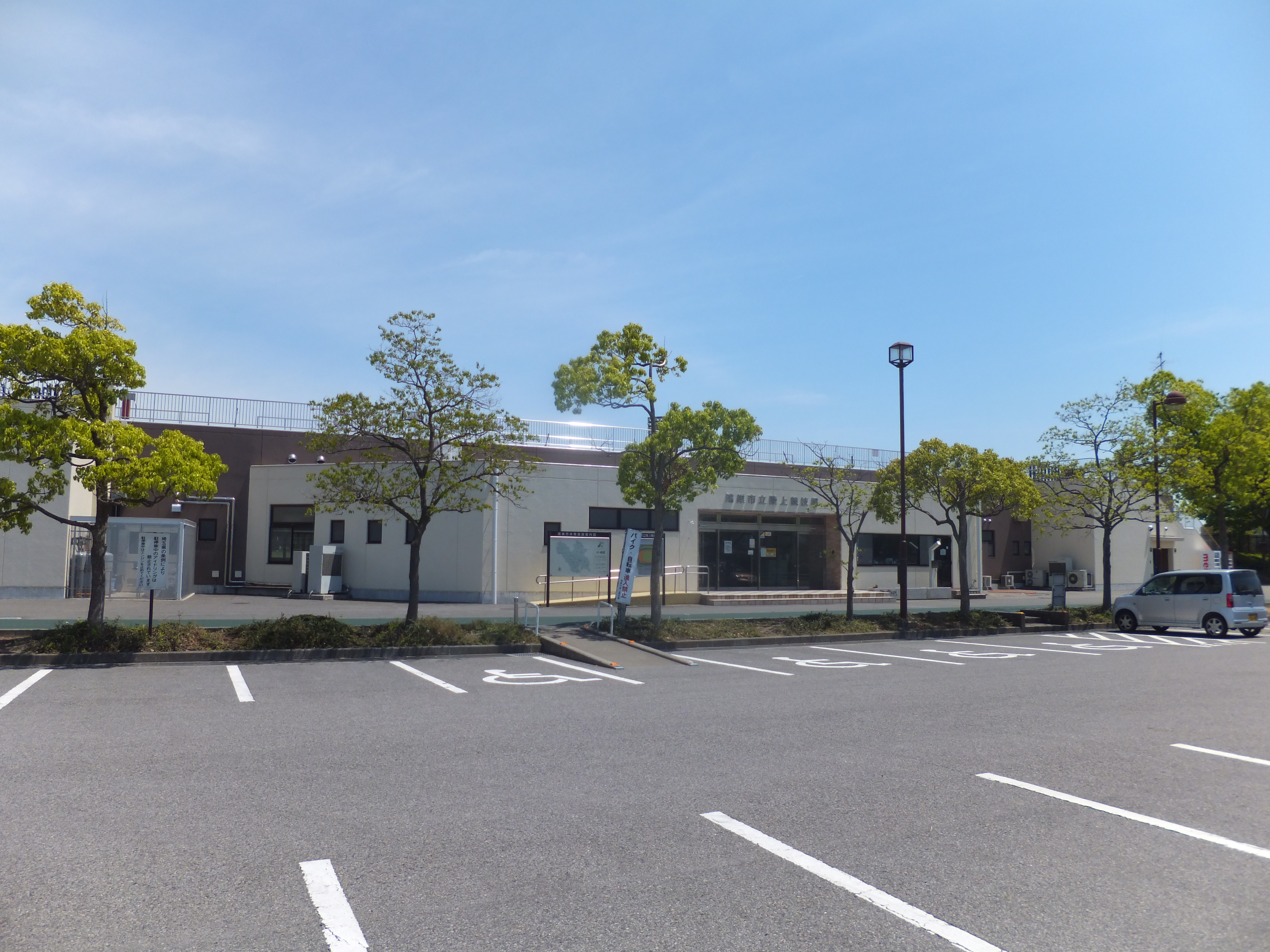
- Interactive map of Konosu Stadium
- Location: Konosu, Saitama, Japan
- Owner: Konosu City
- Capacity: 5,000

Tenants
- NTT Kanto SC; Urawa Reds Ladies

Konosu Stadium (鴻巣市立陸上競技場) is an athletic stadium in Konosu, Saitama, Japan.
