= Masahiro Miyashita =

Japanese footballer

Masahiro Miyashita 宮下 真洋
Personal information
- Full name: Masahiro Miyashita
- Date of birth: October 10, 1975 (age 51)
- Place of birth: Hokkaido, Japan
- Height: 1.68 m (5 ft 6 in)
- Position: Midfielder

Youth career
- 1991–1993: Sapporo Daiichi High School
- 1994–1997: Kokushikan University

Senior career*
Years	Team	Apps	(Gls)
1998–2001	Omiya Ardija		
- * Club domestic league appearances and goals

Masahiro Miyashita (宮下 真洋, Miyashita Masahiro; born October 10, 1975) is a former Japanese football player.

== Playing career ==
Miyashita was born in Hokkaido on October 10, 1975. After graduating from Kokushikan University, he joined Japan Football League club Omiya Ardija in 1998. The club was promoted to J2 League from 1999. He played many matches as midfielder. He retired end of 2001 season.
