= NACK5 Stadium Omiya =

Football stadium in Saitama, Japan

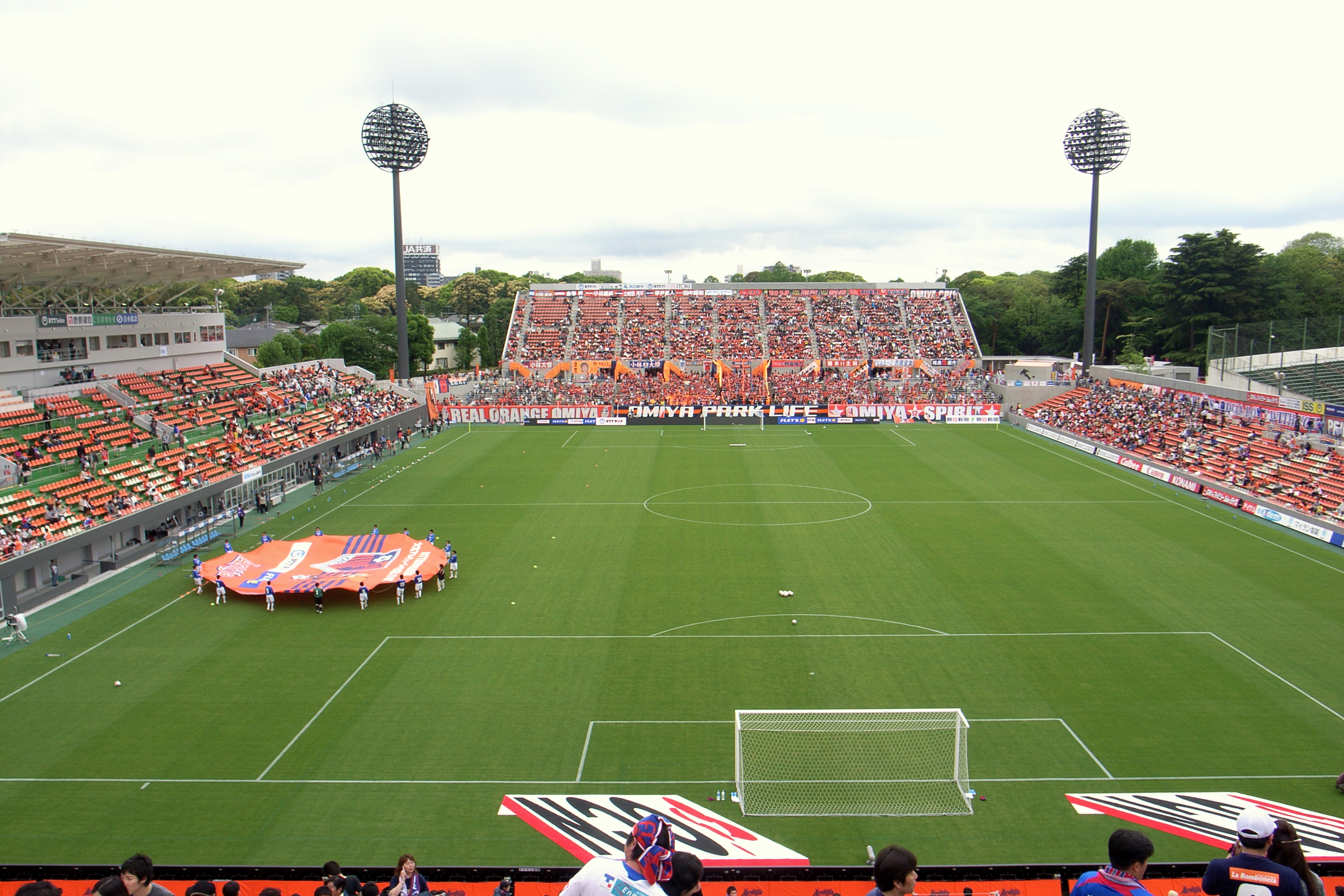
- Interactive map of NACK5 Stadium Omiya
- Former names: Omiya Football Stadium (1960–2007)
- Location: Saitama, Japan
- Coordinates: 35°54′59″N 139°38′00″E
- Owner: Saitama City
- Operator: Saitama City Park Association
- Capacity: 15,491
- Surface: Grass
- Field size: 105 x 68 m
- Public transit: Tobu Railway: Tobu Urban Park Line at Omiya-Koen

Construction
- Opened: 1960
- Renovated: 1995
- Expanded: 2007

Tenant
- RB Omiya Ardija

NACK5 Stadium Omiya (ナックファイブスタジアム大宮, Nakku-faibu Sutajiamu Ōmiya) is a football stadium located in Ōmiya-ku, Saitama, Japan. It is the home stadium of J2 League club RB Omiya Ardija.

It was formerly known as Omiya Football Stadium. Since 14 May 2007 it has been called NACK5 Stadium Omiya (ナックファイブスタジアム大宮, Nakku-faibu Sutajiamu Ōmiya) for the naming rights.

== History ==
Built in 1960, it was one of the first stadia in Japan dedicated to the code. The grandstands were added to host several matches of 1964 Summer Olympics and 1967 National Sports Festival of Japan. The stadium used to accommodate 12,500 spectators.

In 2006-2007 it was closed for expansion works to meet the J. League Division 1 requirements for Ardija to host its home matches. Ardija used Saitama Stadium 2002 and Urawa Komaba Stadium until works were complete.

From 14 May 2007 it would be called NACK5 Stadium Omiya (ナックファイブスタジアム大宮, Nakku-faibu Sutajiamu Ōmiya) to reflect a six-year sponsorship from FM NACK5 (エフエムナックファイブ, Efu Emu Nakku-Faibu) (JODV-FM, 79.5 MHz), an independent commercial radio station based in Ōmiya-ku and covering Saitama Prefecture.

The expansion works were complete in October 2007 and since it accommodates 15,491 spectators.

On 11 November, the re-opening match was held as a J. League season match between the Ardija and Oita Trinita (1-2).

== In popular culture ==
In Captain Tsubasa, the stadium was used for the High School National Championships.
