= 2008 Emperor's Cup =

Tournament details
- Country: Japan
- Teams: 82

Final positions
- Champions: Gamba Osaka (2nd title)
- Runners-up: Kashiwa Reysol

Tournament statistics
- Matches played: 81

The 88th Emperor's Cup began on September 13, 2008 and ended on January 1, 2009 with the final which took place at National Stadium in Tokyo. As the champion, Gamba Osaka participated in 2009 AFC Champions League.

== Calendar ==
Round	Date	Matches	Clubs	New entries this round
First Round	13 September 2008; 14 September 2008	24	48 → 24	47 Prefectural Qualifying Cup Winners; 1 University Qualifying Cup Winner
Second Round	20 September 2008; 21 September 2008	12	24 → 12	–
Third Round	12 October 2008	14	12+15+1 → 14	15 J2 Clubs; 1 JFL Seeded Club
Fourth Round	2 November 2008; 3 November 2008; 5 November 2008	16	14+18 → 16	18 J1 Clubs
Fifth Round	15 November 2008	8	16 → 8	none
Quarter-finals	20 December 2008	4	8 → 4	none
Semi-finals	29 December 2008	2	4 → 2	none
Final	1 January 2009	1	2 → 1	none

== Participants ==
=== J.League Division 1 ===
- Consadole Sapporo
- Kashima Antlers
- Omiya Ardija
- Urawa Red Diamonds
- Kashiwa Reysol
- JEF United Ichihara Chiba
- FC Tokyo
- Tokyo Verdy
- Kawasaki Frontale
- Yokohama F. Marinos
- Shimizu S-Pulse
- Júbilo Iwata
- Nagoya Grampus
- Albirex Niigata
- Kyoto Sanga FC
- Gamba Osaka
- Vissel Kobe
- Oita Trinita

=== J.League Division 2 ===
- Vegalta Sendai
- Montedio Yamagata
- Mito HollyHock
- Thespa Kusatsu
- Yokohama FC
- Shonan Bellmare
- FC Gifu
- Ventforet Kofu
- Cerezo Osaka
- Sanfrecce Hiroshima
- Tokushima Vortis
- Ehime FC
- Avispa Fukuoka
- Sagan Tosu
- Roasso Kumamoto

=== Japan Football League ===
- Tochigi SC

=== Prime Minister Cup University football tournament Winner ===
- Osaka Taiiku University

=== Prefectures ===
- Hokkaidō – Dohto University
- Aomori – Aomori Yamada High School
- Iwate – Grulla Morioka
- Miyagi – Sony Sendai FC
- Akita – TDK S.C.
- Yamagata – Yamagata University
- Fukushima – Fukushima United FC
- Ibaraki – Ryutsu Keizai University
- Tochigi – Hitachi Tochigi Uva SC
- Gunma – Arte Takasaki
- Saitama – Shobi University
- Chiba – JEF United Ichihara Chiba Reserves
- Tokyo – Kokushikan University
- Kanagawa – YSCC Yokohama
- Niigata – Niigata University of Management
- Toyama – Kataller Toyama
- Ishikawa – Zweigen Kanazawa
- Fukui – Saurcos Fukui
- Yamanashi – Tamaho FC
- Nagano – Matsumoto Yamaga FC
- Gifu – FC Gifu Second
- Shizuoka – Honda FC
- Aichi – Aichi Gakuin University
- Mie – Yokkaichi University
- Shiga – Sagawa Shiga FC
- Kyoto – Sagawa Printing SC
- Osaka – Hannan University
- Hyōgo – Banditonce Kakogawa FC
- Nara – Nara Sangyo University
- Wakayama – Kainan FC
- Tottori – Gainare Tottori
- Shimane – Dezzolla Shimane
- Okayama – Fagiano Okayama
- Hiroshima – Fukuyama University
- Yamaguchi – Hitachi Kasado FC
- Tokushima – Tokushima Vortis Second
- Kagawa – Kamatamare Sanuki
- Ehime – Ehime University
- Kochi – Kochi University
- Fukuoka – New Wave Kitakyushu
- Saga – Kyushu Inax SC
- Nagasaki – Mitsubishi Nagasaki SC
- Kumamoto – Kumamoto Ohzu High School
- Ōita – Nippon Bunri University
- Miyazaki – Honda Lock SC
- Kagoshima – Volca Kagoshima
- Okinawa – Okinawa Kariyushi FC

== Matches ==
All matches are Japan Standard Time (UTC+9)

=== First round ===
2008-09-14
13:00

Sagawa Printing SC	7 – 1	Aichi Gakuin University

2008-09-14
13:00

Kainan FC	0 – 2	Ehime University

2008-09-14
13:00

FC Gifu Second	0 – 1	Hannan University

2008-09-13
13:00

Yokkaichi University	1 – 3	Honda FC

2008-09-13
17:00

Saurcos Fukui	2 – 1 (a.e.t.)	Nara Sangyo University

2008-09-14
13:00

Niigata University of Management	1 – 5	Matsumoto Yamaga FC

2008-09-13
13:00

Fagiano Okayama FC	6 – 0	Hitachi Kasado

Momotaro Stadium
2008-09-14
13:00

Fukuyama University	0 – 3	Volca Kagoshima

2008-09-13
13:00

Banditonce Kakogawa FC	0 – 1	Kataller Toyama

2008-09-13
19:00

Zweigen Kanazawa	4 – 3 (a.e.t.)	Sagawa Shiga FC

2008-09-14
13:00

Ryutsu Keizai University	4 – 2	Y.S.C.C Yokohama

2008-09-14
13:00

Tamaho FC	0 – 10	Sony Sendai FC

2008-09-13
13:00

Dohto University	4 – 1	Shobi University

Sapporo Atsubetsu Park Stadium
2008-09-14
13:00

Fukushima United F.C	1 – 4	Kokushikan University

2008-09-14
13:00

Kyushu Inax	1 – 3	Okinawa Kariyushi

2008-09-14
13:00

Ohzu H.S	2 – 1	Nippon Bunri University

KKWing Stadium
2008-09-14
14:00

Mitsubishi Nagasaki	3 – 0	Dezzolla Shimane

2008-09-14
13:00

New Wave Kitakyushu	1 – 1 (a.e.t.)	Honda Lock SC
Penalties
	4 – 2

Level-5 stadium
2008-09-13
13:00

Tokushima Vortis Second	2 – 1	Kochi University

2008-09-13
13:00

Kamatamare Sanuki	1 – 0	Gainare Tottori

2008-09-14
13:00

Hitachi Tochigi Uva SC	2 – 0	Aomori Yamada H.S

Tochigi Green Stadium
2008-09-14
13:00

Arte Takasaki	0 – 2	JEF United Ichihara Chiba Reserves

2008-09-13
13:00

TDK S.C.	2 – 3 (a.e.t.)	Osaka Taiiku University

2008-09-13
13:00

Grulla Morioka	5 – 1	Yamagata University

=== Second round ===
2008-09-21
13:00

Sagawa Printing SC	5 – 1	Ehime University

2008-09-21
13:00

Hannan University	0 – 4	Honda FC

2008-09-20
13:00

Saurcos Fukui	0 – 4	Matsumoto Yamaga FC

2008-09-20
13:00

Fagiano Okayama	2 – 0	Volca Kagoshima

Momotaro Stadium
2008-09-21
13:00

Kataller Toyama	1 – 2	Zweigen Kanazawa

2008-09-14
13:00

Ryutsu Keizai University	2 – 3 (a.e.t.)	Sony Sendai FC

Kasamatsu Stadium
2008-09-21
13:00

Dohto University	1 – 6	Kokushikan University

Sapporo Atsubetsu Park Stadium
2008-09-21
13:00

Okinawa Kariyushi	2 – 1	Ohzu H.S

Best Amenity Stadium, Tosu
2008-09-20
13:00

Mitsubishi Nagasaki	0 – 1	New Wave Kitakyushu

2008-09-20
13:00

Tokushima Vortis Second	2 – 1	Kamatamare Sanuki

2008-09-21
13:00

Hitachi Tochigi Uva SC	2 – 1	JEF United Ichihara Chiba Reserves

2008-09-20
13:00

Osaka Taiiku University	3 – 0	Grulla Morioka

=== Third round ===
The 15 J2 teams plus one JFL representative (Tochigi SC) entered at this round.

2008-10-12
13:01

Sagawa Printing SC	1 – 2	Ehime FC
Hirai 37'	Report	Uchimura 42'; Oki 64'

Ningineer Stadium, Matsuyama
Attendance: 1,569
Referee: Masaaki Iemoto

2008-10-12
13:00

Sagan Tosu	4 – 0	Honda FC
Uchima 2'; Hirose 57' 67'; Funatani 82'	Report

Best Amenity Stadium, Tosu
Attendance: 2,307
Referee: Hiroyuki Ōnishi

2008-10-12
19:00

Shonan Bellmare	1 – 1 (a.e.t.)	Matsumoto Yamaga FC
Hara 23'	Report	Kakimoto 26'
Penalties
Y. Abe (penalty scored); Sakamoto (penalty scored); Naza (penalty scored); Usui (penalty scored); Saito (penalty missed); Ishihara (penalty missed)	4 – 5	(penalty scored) Kakimoto; (penalty scored) Onishi; (penalty missed) Kawata; (penalty scored) T. Abe; (penalty scored) Yahata; (penalty scored) Ozawa

Hiratsuka Stadium, Hiratsuka
Attendance: 2,580
Referee: Hiroshi Yamauchi

2008-10-12
13:00

Ventforet Kofu	1 – 0	Fagiano Okayama
Onishi 44'	Report

Kose Sports Stadium, Kofu
Attendance: 4,420
Referee: Takuto Okabe

2008-10-12
13:00

Tochigi SC	1 – 1 (a.e.t.)	Roasso Kumamoto
Okada 81'	Report	Komorida 54'
Penalties
Sato (penalty scored); Yokoyama (penalty scored); Matsuda (penalty scored); Okada (penalty scored); Ochiai (penalty scored)	5 – 3	(penalty scored) Takahashi; (penalty scored) Fukuo; (penalty missed) Kobayashi; (penalty scored) Yamamoto

Tochigi Green Stadium, Utsunomiya
Attendance: 3,011
Referee: Yoshiro Imamura

2008-10-12
13:03

Zweigen Kanazawa	0 – 1	FC Gifu
	Report	Aikawa 83'

Toyama Athletic Recreation Park Stadium Toyama
Attendance: 1,515
Referee: Kenji Ogiya

2008-10-12
13:00

Cerezo Osaka	1 – 0	Sony Sendai FC
Gilton 65'	Report

Nagai Stadium, Osaka
Attendance: 2,403
Referee: Shinji Murakami

2008-10-12
13:00

Tokushima Vortis	0 – 1 (a.e.t.)	Kokushikan University
	Report	Matsumoto 118'

Naruto Athletic Stadium, Naruto
Attendance: 1,174
Referee: Ryoichi Imamura

2008-10-12
13:04

Yokohama FC	2 – 1	Okinawa Kariyushi FC
Ikemoto 41'; Hakkaku 89'	Report	Saito 37'

Mitsuzawa Stadium, Yokohama
Attendance: 2,358
Referee: Hiroharu Kitamura

2008-10-12
13:01

Vegalta Sendai	2 – 0	New Wave Kitakyushu
Nakashima 20'; Tanoue 89'	Report

Sendai Stadium, Sendai
Attendance: 6,357
Referee: Itaru Hirose

2008-10-12
13:00

Thespa Kusatsu	2 – 0	Tokushima Vortis Second
Goto 48'; Takada 66'	Report

Shikishima Stadium, Maebashi
Attendance: 1,693
Referee: Kazuyuki Hayakawa

2008-10-12
13:00

Avispa Fukuoka	0 – 1 (a.e.t.)	Mito HollyHock
	Report	Matsumoto 114'

Level-5 stadium, Fukuoka
Attendance: 1,738
Referee: Koji Tanabe

2008-10-12
13:00

Montedio Yamagata	4 – 1 (a.e.t.)	Hitachi Tochigi Uva SC
Sakai 36'; Toyoda 93' 111'; Miyazaki 112'	Report	Tatesawa 54'

Yamagata Park Stadium, Yamagata
Attendance: 2,185
Referee: Tomohiro Inoue

2008-10-12
13:00

Osaka Taiiku University	0 – 6	Sanfrecce Hiroshima
	Report	Makino 15'; Hattori 30' 75'; Moriwaki 60'; Takayanagi 86'; Kubo 87'

Yabase Athletic Stadium, Akita
Attendance: 1,271
Referee: Hiroyuki Kimura

=== Fourth round ===
The 18 J1 teams entered at this round.

2008-11-03
13:01

Urawa Red Diamonds	1 – 0 (a.e.t.)	Ehime FC
Ponte 96'	Report

Urawa Komaba Stadium Saitama
Attendance: 16,724
Referee: Masaki Nabeshima

2008-11-02
13:00

Yokohama F. Marinos	1 – 0	Consadole Sapporo
Hyōdō 70'	Report

Mitsuzawa Stadium Yokohama
Attendance: 5,728
Referee: Hirofumi Yamanishi

2008-11-05
19:00

Oita Trinita	0 – 2	Sagan Tosu
	Report	Hirose 28' 52'

Ōita Stadium, Ōita
Attendance: 5,512
Referee: Shinji Murakami

2008-11-02
13:00

Matsumoto Yamaga FC	0 – 8	Vissel Kobe
	Report	Yoshida 13'; Tanaka 29'; Leandro 50' 84'; Kurihara 63' 73', 75'; Ōkubo 65'

Home's Stadium Kobe, Kobe
Attendance: 3,268
Referee: Naohiro Ikeda

2008-11-16
13:04

Gamba Osaka	2 – 1 (a.e.t.)	Ventforet Kofu
Yamaguchi 80'; Sasaki 104'	Report	Maranhao 1'

Osaka Expo '70 Stadium, Osaka, Osaka Prefecture
Attendance: 3,694
Referee: Yoshitsugu Katayama

2008-11-02
13:04

Júbilo Iwata	3 – 1	Tochigi SC
Kawamura 43'; Nakayama 69'; Ota 72'	Report	Sato 66'

Yamaha Stadium, Iwata
Attendance: 4,088
Referee: Jumpei Iida

2008-11-02
13:05

Nagoya Grampus	1 – 0	FC Gifu
Yoshida 89'	Report

Toyota Stadium, Toyota
Attendance: 7,597
Referee: Takuya Maeda

2008-11-02
13:00

Omiya Ardija	1 – 0	Cerezo Osaka
Lavrič 61'	Report

NACK5 Stadium, Ōmiya, Saitama
Attendance: 3,574
Referee: Hirose Itaru

2008-11-02
13:04

Kashima Antlers	2 – 2 (a.e.t.)	Kokushikan University
Danilo 43'; Marquinhos 74'	Report	Takahashi 39'; Amano 59
Penalties
Marquinhos (penalty scored); Nozawa (penalty scored); Danilo (penalty scored)	3 – 0	(penalty missed) Takeoka; (penalty missed) Kashiwa; (penalty missed) Yoshino

Kashima Soccer Stadium, Kashima
Attendance: 5,286
Referee: Yuki Noda

2008-11-05
19:03

Shimizu S-Pulse	1 – 0	JEF United Ichihara Chiba
Okazaki 89'	Report

Nihondaira Sports Stadium, Shimizu
Attendance: 4,214
Referee: Koji Tanabe

2008-11-02
13:01

Albirex Niigata	2 – 0	Yokohama FC
Alessandro 18'; Uchida 20'	Report

Niigata Stadium, Niigata
Attendance: 7,607
Referee: Naohito Ogawa

2008-11-02
13:00

FC Tokyo	2 – 1	Vegalta Sendai
Hirayama 19' 89'	Report	Nakahara 72'

Ajinomoto Stadium, Chōfu
Attendance: 10,528
Referee: Ryuji Sato

2008-11-02
13:00

Kashiwa Reysol	1 – 0	Thespa Kusatsu
Suganuma 83'	Report

Kashiwa no Ha Park Stadium Kashiwa
Attendance: 4,596
Referee: Ryoichi Imamura

2008-11-02
13:00

Mito HollyHock	0 – 3	Kyoto Sanga FC
	Report	Ando 11'; Nishino 46'; Hayashi 47'

Nishikyogoku Athletic Stadium, Kyoto
Attendance: 2,802
Referee: Yuichi Nishimura

2008-11-03
13:04

Kawasaki Frontale	3 – 1	Montedio Yamagata
Taniguchi 19'; Vitor Júnior 43'; Renatinho 56'	Report	Ishii 9'

Todoroki Athletics Stadium, Kawasaki
Attendance: 8,221
Referee: Akio Okutani

2008-11-02
13:00

Tokyo Verdy	0 – 1	Sanfrecce Hiroshima
	Report	Takayanagi 89'

Nishigaoka National Stadium, Tokyo
Attendance: 5,411
Referee: Masaaki Iemoto

=== Fifth round ===
2008-11-15
13:00

Urawa Red Diamonds	2 – 2 (a.e.t.)	Yokohama F. Marinos
Escudero 43'; Horinouchi 47'	Report	Kano 5'; Tanaka 20'
Penalties
Ponte (penalty scored); Nagai (penalty scored); Umesaki (penalty scored); Hirakawa (penalty scored); Nishizawa (penalty scored); Suzuki (penalty missed)	5 – 6	(penalty scored) Kano; (penalty scored) Hyōdō; (penalty scored) Ogura; (penalty scored) Tanaka; (penalty scored) Tanaka; (penalty scored) Kurihara

Marugame Stadium, Marugame
Attendance: 10,303
Referee: Kenji Ogiya

2008-11-15
13:04

Sagan Tosu	5 – 2	Vissel Kobe
Fujita 1' 57'; Takahashi 9'; Hirose 36' 52'	Report	Komoto 46'; Park Kang-Jo 80'

Home's Stadium, Kobe
Attendance: 2,856
Referee: Akio Okutani

2008-11-26
19:04

Júbilo Iwata	1 – 3	Gamba Osaka
Nishi 1'	Report	Sasaki 15'; Yamaguchi 55'; Yamazaki 74'

Yamaha Stadium, Iwata
Attendance: 2,648
Referee: Shinji Murakami

2008-11-15
13:00

Omiya Ardija	1 – 2	Nagoya Grampus
Uchida 25'	Report	Johnsen 2' 34'

NACK5 Stadium, Ōmiya
Attendance: 4,371
Referee: Ryuji Sato

2008-11-15
13:00

Kashima Antlers	3 – 4 (a.e.t.)	Shimizu S-Pulse
Masuda 28'; Marquinhos 50'; Marcinho 114'	Report	Hyodo 17'; Yamamoto 80'; Edamura 104'; Hara 119'

Kashima Soccer Stadium, Kashima
Attendance: 5,158
Referee: Hajime Matsuo

2008-11-15
13:00

Albirex Niigata	2 – 3	FC Tokyo
Marcio 6'; Chiba 21'	Report	Emerson 31'; Akamine 53'; Kajiyama 62'

Tottori Soccer Stadium, Tottori
Attendance: 3,211
Referee: Nabeshima Masaki

2008-11-15
13:00

Kashiwa Reysol	1 – 0	Kyoto Sanga FC
Popó 63'	Report

Toyama Athletic Recreation Park Stadium, Toyama
Attendance: 5,023
Referee: Masayoshi Okada

2008-11-15
13:04

Kawasaki Frontale	0 – 2	Sanfrecce Hiroshima
	Report	Aoyama 33'; Morisaki 57'

Nagasaki Stadium, Isahaya
Attendance: 4,858
Referee: Kazuhiko Matsumura

=== Quarter finals ===
2008-12-20
13:03

Sagan Tosu	1 – 3	Yokohama F. Marinos
Hirose 23'	Report	Nakazawa 26'; Kurihara 44'; Kano 89'

Best Amenity Stadium, Tosu
Attendance: 9,656
Referee: Hajime Matsuo

2008-12-25
19:05

Gamba Osaka	2 – 1	Nagoya Grampus
Lucas 13'; Nakazawa 22'	Report	Sugimoto 70'

Kobe Universiade Memorial Stadium, Kobe
Attendance: 4,955
Referee: Toshimitsu Yoshida

2008-12-20
13:04

Shimizu S-Pulse	1 – 2	FC Tokyo
Takagi 25'	Report	Akamine 49' 50'

Yurtec Stadium Sendai, Sendai
Attendance: 8,051
Referee: Hiroyoshi Takayama

2008-12-20
15:04

Kashiwa Reysol	3 – 2 (a.e.t.)	Sanfrecce Hiroshima
Koga 3'; Suganuma 13'; França 99'	Report	Satō 6' 26'

Momotaro Stadium, Okayama
Attendance: 8,531
Referee: Masaaki Iemoto

=== Semi finals ===
2008-12-29
15:05

Yokohama F. Marinos	0 – 1 (a.e.t.)	Gamba Osaka
	Report	Yamazaki 117'

National Stadium, Tokyo
Attendance: 19,843
Referee: Kazuhiko Matsumura

2008-12-29
13:06

FC Tokyo	1 – 2	Kashiwa Reysol
Suzuki 31'	Report	França 68'; Lee 88'

Shizuoka Stadium, Fukuroi, Shizuoka
Attendance: 12,458
Referee: Kenji Ogiya

=== Final ===
2009-01-01
14:02

Gamba Osaka	1 – 0 (a.e.t.)	Kashiwa Reysol
Bando 116'	Report

National Stadium, Tokyo
Attendance: 44,066
Referee: Yuichi Nishimura
