= 2009 Tochigi SC season =

Tochigi S.C.
2009 season
- Manager: Hiroshi Matsuda
- Stadium: Tochigi Green Stadium
- J. League 2: 17th of 18
- Emperor's Cup: 2nd Round
- Top goalscorer: Kazuhisa Kawahara (13)
Home colours	Away colours

2009 Tochigi S.C. season

== League table ==
Pos	Team	Pld	W	D	L	GF	GA	GD	Pts
14	Roasso Kumamoto	51	16	10	25	66	82	−16	58
15	Ehime FC	51	12	11	28	54	80	−26	47
16	Yokohama FC	51	11	11	29	43	70	−27	44
17	Tochigi SC	51	8	13	30	38	77	−39	37
18	Fagiano Okayama	51	8	12	31	40	84	−44	36

Updated to match(es) played on December 5, 2009. Source: J.League Division 2
Rules for classification: 1) points; 2) goal difference; 3) number of goals scored.

== Domestic results ==
=== J2 League ===
As of 5 December 2009, these are all the matches they played for 2009 season. Tochigi SC results for 2009. (Japanese)

Match	Date	Team	Score	Team	Venue	Attendance
1	08.03.2009	Tochigi SC	0-1	FC Gifu	Tochigi Green Stadium	5,523
2	15.03.2009	Tochigi SC	0-1	Shonan Bellmare	Tochigi Green Stadium	5,093
3	22.03.2009	Cerezo Osaka	1-0	Tochigi SC	Nagai Ball Game Field	5,815
4	25.03.2009	Tochigi SC	0-2	Avispa Fukuoka	National Stadium	2,020
5	29.03.2009	Tokyo Verdy	1-0	Tochigi SC	National Stadium	4,404
6	05.04.2009	Tochigi SC	1-0	Fagiano Okayama	Tochigi Green Stadium	4,584
7	11.04.2009	Ehime FC	0-0	Tochigi SC	Ningineer Stadium	2,521
8	15.04.2009	Tochigi SC	0-0	Tokushima Vortis	Tochigi Green Stadium	1,896
9	18.04.2009	Vegalta Sendai	1-0	Tochigi SC	Miyagi Stadium	9,678
10	26.04.2009	Tochigi SC	3-3	Ventforet Kofu	Tochigi Green Stadium	4,875
11	29.04.2009	Sagan Tosu	3-2	Tochigi SC	Best Amenity Stadium	4,250
12	02.05.2009	Tochigi SC	0-4	Kataller Toyama	Tochigi Green Stadium	5,900
13	05.05.2009	Consadole Sapporo	3-2	Tochigi SC	Sapporo Dome	15,696
14	10.05.2009	Yokohama FC	1-2	Tochigi SC	NHK Spring Mitsuzawa Football Stadium	3,829
15	17.05.2009	Tochigi SC	1-1	Roasso Kumamoto	Tochigi Green Stadium	2,349
16	20.05.2009	Thespa Kusatsu	0-1	Tochigi SC	Shoda Shoyu Stadium Gunma	4,094
17	24.05.2009	Tochigi SC	2-3	Mito HollyHock	Tochigi Green Stadium	3,802
18	28.05.2009	Kataller Toyama	0-1	Tochigi SC	Toyama Stadium	1,882
19	03.06.2009	Tochigi SC	0-1	Consadole Sapporo	Tochigi Green Stadium	1,819
20	07.06.2009	Tokushima Vortis	2-1	Tochigi SC	Pocarisweat Stadium	3,712
21	14.06.2009	Tochigi SC	0-5	Sagan Tosu	Tochigi Green Stadium	15,857
22	21.06.2009	Roasso Kumamoto	2-0	Tochigi SC	Kumamoto Athletics Stadium	2,834
23	24.06.2009	Tochigi SC	1-2	Vegalta Sendai	Tochigi Green Stadium	5,287
24	28.06.2009	Shonan Bellmare	1-1	Tochigi SC	Hiratsuka Stadium	4,517
25	05.07.2009	Ventforet Kofu	1-1	Tochigi SC	Kose Sports Park Stadium	11,476
26	08.07.2009	Tochigi SC	1-3	Cerezo Osaka	Tochigi Green Stadium	6,875
27	11.07.2009	Avispa Fukuoka	1-0	Tochigi SC	Level-5 Stadium	3,859
28	19.07.2009	Tochigi SC	0-3	Tokyo Verdy	Tochigi Green Stadium	7,456
29	22.07.2009	Fagiano Okayama	2-0	Tochigi SC	Momotaro Stadium	3,661
30	25.07.2009	Tochigi SC	0-0	Thespa Kusatsu	Tochigi Green Stadium	4,296
31	01.08.2009	Mito HollyHock	3-1	Tochigi SC	Kasamatsu Stadium	3,910
32	05.08.2009	FC Gifu	1-1	Tochigi SC	Nagaragawa Stadium	3,241
33	10.09.2009	Tochigi SC	1-0	Yokohama FC	Tochigi Green Stadium	4,507
34	15.08.2009	Tochigi SC	1-2	Ehime FC	Tochigi Green Stadium	5,105
35	23.08.2009	Avispa Fukuoka	3-1	Tochigi SC	Level-5 Stadium	7,832
36	29.08.2009	Tochigi SC	0-2	Sagan Tosu	Tochigi Green Stadium	3,467
37	02.09.2009	Sagan Tosu	1-1	Tochigi SC	Best Amenity Stadium	3,856
38	06.09.2009	Tochigi SC	1-1	Kataller Toyama	Tochigi Green Stadium	3,170
39	13.09.2009	Mito HollyHock	0-2	Tochigi SC	Kasamatsu Stadium	3,475
40	20.09.2009	Vegalta Sendai	2-0	Tochigi SC	Yurtec Stadium Sendai	16,038
41	23.09.2009	Tochigi SC	2-1	FC Gifu	Tochigi Green Stadium	4,337
42	27.09.2009	Cerezo Osaka	1-0	Tochigi SC	Osaka Nagai Stadium	7,742
43	03.10.2009	Tochigi SC	1-1	Ehime FC	Tochigi Green Stadium	2,411
44	07.10.2009	Fagiano Okayama	0-1	Tochigi SC	Tottori Bank Bird Stadium	615
45	18.10.2009	Tochigi SC	1-2	Ventforet Kofu	Tochigi Green Stadium	5,030
46	21.10.2009	Consadole Sapporo	1-0	Tochigi SC	Sapporo Atsubetsu Stadium	5,112
47	24.10.2009	Tochigi SC	0-0	Tokushima Vortis	Tochigi Green Stadium	2,618
48	08.11.2009	Tochigi SC	0-2	Roasso Kumamoto	Tochigi Green Stadium	3,180
49	22.11.2009	Yokohama FC	1-0	Tochigi SC	Komazawa Park Stadium	4,749
50	29.11.2009	Tochigi SC	2-3	Tokyo Verdy	Tochigi Green Stadium	6,186
51	05.12.2009	Thespa Kusatsu	3-2	Tochigi SC	SHODA Shoyu Stadium Gunma	5,661

=== Emperor's Cup ===
Date	Team	Score	Team	Venue	Attendance	Reference
10.10.2009	FC Gifu	1-0	Tochigi SC	Nagaragawa Athletic Field	2,345	Official Japanese data website

== Player statistics ==
No.	Pos.	Player	D.o.B. (Age)	Height / Weight	J. League 2		Emperor's Cup		Total	
No.	Pos.	Player	D.o.B. (Age)	Height / Weight	Apps	Goals	Apps	Goals	Apps	Goals
1	GK	Kunihiro Shibazaki	April 1, 1985 (aged 23)	cm / kg	17	0	1	0	18	0
2	DF	Yuki Okada	October 4, 1983 (aged 25)	cm / kg	38	4	1	0	39	4
3	DF	Yuki Okubo	April 17, 1984 (aged 24)	cm / kg	31	3				
4	DF	Yuki Inoue	October 31, 1977 (aged 31)	cm / kg	15	0				
5	DF	Masayuki Ochiai	July 11, 1981 (aged 27)	cm / kg	33	0	1	0	34	0
6	DF	Toshikazu Irie	November 11, 1984 (aged 24)	cm / kg	44	1	1	0	45	1
7	MF	Yusuke Sato	November 2, 1977 (aged 31)	cm / kg	16	2				
8	MF	Keisuke Kurihara	May 20, 1973 (aged 35)	cm / kg	34	0				
9	FW	Masatoshi Matsuda	September 4, 1980 (aged 28)	cm / kg	17	1				
10	MF	Ryosuke Takayasu	May 14, 1984 (aged 24)	cm / kg	18	1				
11	MF	Yasuki Ishidate	September 24, 1984 (aged 24)	cm / kg	41	2				
13	MF	Takumi Motohashi	August 3, 1982 (aged 26)	cm / kg	33	1	1	0	34	0
14	FW	Hisahito Inaba	May 26, 1985 (aged 23)	cm / kg	26	4				
15	MF	Takashi Kamoshida	August 5, 1985 (aged 23)	cm / kg	48	1	1	0	49	1
16	DF	Masaya Saito	June 8, 1985 (aged 23)	cm / kg	5	0				
17	MF	Atsushi Ito	September 24, 1983 (aged 25)	cm / kg	11	0				
18	MF	Shinichi Mukai	June 15, 1985 (aged 23)	cm / kg	27	1	1	0	28	1
19	DF	Hideyuki Akai	May 2, 1985 (aged 23)	cm / kg	37	0	1	0	38	0
20	FW	Kazuhisa Kawahara	January 29, 1987 (aged 22)	cm / kg	48	13	1	0	49	13
21	GK	Hiroyuki Takeda	November 30, 1983 (aged 25)	cm / kg	5	0				
22	DF	Masataka Tamura	January 12, 1988 (aged 21)	cm / kg	3	0				
23	DF	Atsushi Yoneyama	November 20, 1976 (aged 32)	cm / kg	37	0	1	0	38	0
24	DF	Norihiro Kawakami	April 4, 1987 (aged 21)	cm / kg	6	1				
25	DF	Yusei Kudo	April 5, 1986 (aged 22)	cm / kg	1	0				
27	MF	Daisuke Hoshi	December 10, 1980 (aged 28)	cm / kg	5	0				
28	FW	Leonardo	February 4, 1986 (aged 23)	cm / kg	14	1	1	0	15	1
29	GK	Kiyomitsu Kobari	June 12, 1977 (aged 31)	cm / kg	29	0				
30	FW	Choi Kun-Sik	April 25, 1981 (aged 27)	cm / kg	17	0				
32	DF	Toru Miyamoto	December 3, 1982 (aged 26)	cm / kg	15	0	1	0	16	0
33	DF	Lee Jong-min	May 21, 1987 (aged 21)	cm / kg	0	0				
36	FW	Manabu Wakabayashi	June 3, 1979 (aged 29)	cm / kg	38	1	1	0	39	1

Emperor's Cup data reference
