= 2010 Tochigi SC season =

Tochigi S.C.
2010 season
- Manager: Hiroshi Matsuda
- Stadium: Tochigi Green Stadium
- J. League 2: 10th of 19
- Emperor's Cup: 3rd Round
- Top goalscorer: Ricardo Lobo (16)
- Highest home attendance: 6,933 (JEF United Chiba)
- Lowest home attendance: 1,913 (Ehime)
- Average home league attendance: 4,841
Home colours	Away colours

2010 Tochigi S.C. season

== League table ==
Pos	Team	Pld	W	D	L	GF	GA	GD	Pts
8	Tokushima Vortis	36	15	6	15	51	47	+4	51
9	Sagan Tosu	36	13	12	11	42	41	+1	51
10	Tochigi SC	36	14	8	14	46	42	+4	50
11	Ehime FC	36	12	12	12	34	34	0	48
12	Thespa Kusatsu	36	14	6	16	36	48	−12	48

Updated to match(es) played on December 4, 2010. Source: J.League Division 2
Rules for classification: 1) points; 2) goal difference; 3) number of goals scored.

== J2 League ==
As of the 5 December 2010, these are all the matches they played for 2010 season. Tochigi SC results for 2010. (Japanese)

Match	Date	Team	Score	Team	Venue	Attendance
1	06.03.2010	Mito HollyHock	2-1	Tochigi SC	Kasdenki Stadium, Mito	3,581
2	14.03.2010	Tochigi SC	0-0	Kashiwa Reysol	Tochigi Green Stadium	6,216
3	21.03.2010	Tochigi SC	0-1	Consadole Sapporo	Tochigi Green Stadium	4,752
4	28.03.2010	Oita Trinita	1-4	Tochigi SC	Oita Bank Dome	10,287
5	04.04.2010	Fagiano Okayama	1-2	Tochigi SC	Kanko Stadium	5,504
6	11.04.2010	Tochigi SC	0-0	Thespa Kusatsu	Tochigi Green Stadium	4,098
7	18.04.2010	Giravanz Kitakyushu	1-1	Tochigi SC	Honjo Athletic Stadium	2,596
9	29.04.2010	Tochigi SC	2-2	JEF United Chiba	Tochigi Green Stadium	6,933
10	02.05.2010	Tochigi SC	2-0	Tokushima Vortis	Tochigi Green Stadium	4,137
11	05.05.2010	Ehime FC	0-0	Tochigi SC	Ningineer Stadium	2,787
12	09.05.2010	Yokohama FC	0-2	Tochigi SC	NHK Spring Mitsuzawa Stadium	4,426
13	16.05.2010	Tochigi SC	1-0	Kataller Toyama	Tochigi Green Stadium	3,330
14	22.05.2010	Roasso Kumamoto	0-2	Tochigi SC	Mizumaeji Temple	2,803
15	30.05.2010	Tochigi SC	2-0	FC Gifu	Tochigi Green Stadium	3,294
16	06.06.2010	Tochigi SC	1-2	Avispa Fukuoka	Tochigi Green Stadium	3,858
17	12.06.2010	Sagan Tosu	3-1	Tochigi SC	Best Amenity Stadium	4,895
18	18.07.2010	Tochigi SC	0-1	Tokyo Verdy	Tochigi Green Stadium	5,325
19	25.07.2010	Ventforet Kofu	4-3	Tochigi SC	Kose Sports Park Stadium	12,121
20	30.07.2010	Tochigi SC	2-1	Yokohama FC	Tochigi Green Stadium	4,218
21	08.08.2010	Thespa Kusatsu	2-1	Tochigi SC	Shoda Soy Sauce Stadium, Gunma	7,946
22	14.08.2010	Tochigi SC	2-0	Oita Trinita	Tochigi Green Stadium	3,670
23	21.08.2010	Consadole Sapporo	0-0	Tochigi SC	Sapporo Atsubetsu	6,817
24	28.08.2010	Tochigi SC	1-2	Roasso Kumamoto	Tochigi Green Stadium	3,504
25	12.09.2010	Tokushima Vortis	4-0	Tochigi SC	Naruto Otsuka	3,186
26	18.09.2010	Tokyo Verdy	0-0	Tochigi SC	Ajista	3,736
27	23.09.2010	Tochigi SC	1-0	Ehime FC	Tochigi Green Stadium	1,913
28	26.09.2010	JEF United Chiba	2-1	Tochigi SC	Fukuari	9,509
29	02.10.2010	Kashiwa Reysol	1-1	Tochigi SC	Hitachi Kashiwa Soccer Field	7,525
30	17.10.2010	Tochigi SC	2-0	Giravanz Kitakyushu	Tochigi Green Stadium	3,742
32	31.10.2010	Tochigi SC	1-2	Fagiano Okayama	Tochigi Green Stadium	2,937
33	06.11.2010	Avispa Fukuoka	2-3	Tochigi SC	Level Five Stadium	6,007
34	14.11.2010	Tochigi SC	0-2	Ventforet Kofu	Tochigi Green Stadium	5,625
35	20.11.2010	Kataller Toyama	0-3	Tochigi SC	Toyama Prefectural Sports Park Athletic Stadium	2,584
36	23.11.2010	Tochigi SC	0-1	Mito HollyHock	Tochigi Green Stadium	3,547
37	28.11.2010	FC Gifu	4-2	Tochigi SC	Gifu Memorial Center Nagaragawa Ball Game Meadow	3,143
38	04.12.2010	Tochigi SC	2-1	Sagan Tosu	Tochigi Green Stadium	3,722

J2 Official Reference to results

=== Emperor's Cup ===
Date	Team	Score	Team	Venue	Attendance	Reference
10.10.2010	FC Gifu	1-0	Tochigi SC	Nagaragawa Athletic Field	2,345	Official Japanese data website

== Player statistics ==
No.	Pos.	Player	D.o.B. (Age)	Height / Weight	J. League 2		Emperor's Cup		Total	
No.	Pos.	Player	D.o.B. (Age)	Height / Weight	Apps	Goals	Apps	Goals	Apps	Goals
1	GK	Kunihiro Shibazaki	April 1, 1985 (aged 24)	cm / kg	19	0				
2	DF	Yuki Okada	October 4, 1983 (aged 26)	cm / kg	19	0				
3	DF	Yuki Okubo	April 17, 1984 (aged 25)	cm / kg	31	3				
4	DF	Toru Miyamoto	December 3, 1982 (aged 27)	cm / kg	11	1				
5	DF	Masayuki Ochiai	July 11, 1981 (aged 28)	cm / kg	5	0				
6	DF	Toshikazu Irie	November 11, 1984 (aged 25)	cm / kg	21	0				
7	MF	Yusuke Sato	November 2, 1977 (aged 32)	cm / kg	16	1				
8	MF	Koji Hirose	March 13, 1984 (aged 25)	cm / kg	33	3				
9	FW	Ricardo Lobo	May 20, 1984 (aged 25)	cm / kg	31	16				
10	MF	Kazumasa Takagi	December 17, 1984 (aged 25)	cm / kg	35	2				
11	FW	Leonardo	February 4, 1986 (aged 24)	cm / kg	10	0				
11	MF	Paulinho	January 26, 1989 (aged 21)	cm / kg	17	2				
13	MF	Takumi Motohashi	August 3, 1982 (aged 27)	cm / kg	24	0				
14	FW	Hiroyuki Hayashi	October 5, 1983 (aged 26)	cm / kg	28	1				
15	MF	Takashi Kamoshida	August 5, 1985 (aged 24)	cm / kg	6	0				
16	MF	Makoto Sugimoto	October 27, 1987 (aged 22)	cm / kg	24	3				
17	DF	Masato Hashimoto	October 12, 1989 (aged 20)	cm / kg	0	0				
18	FW	Choi Kun-Sik	April 25, 1981 (aged 28)	cm / kg	30	8				
19	DF	Hideyuki Akai	May 2, 1985 (aged 24)	cm / kg	26	2				
20	FW	Takayuki Funayama	May 6, 1987 (aged 22)	cm / kg	12	0				
21	GK	Hiroyuki Takeda	November 30, 1983 (aged 26)	cm / kg	17	0				
22	GK	Tatsumi Iida	July 22, 1985 (aged 24)	cm / kg	0	0				
23	DF	Atsushi Yoneyama	November 20, 1976 (aged 33)	cm / kg	17	0				
24	DF	Masahiro Nasukawa	December 29, 1986 (aged 23)	cm / kg	14	1				
25	MF	Tatsuya Onodera	August 4, 1987 (aged 22)	cm / kg	5	0				
26	DF	Hirokazu Usami	June 18, 1987 (aged 22)	cm / kg	9	0				
30	DF	Yeo Hyo-Jin	April 25, 1983 (aged 26)	cm / kg	28	0				
38	MF	Kota Mizunuma	February 22, 1990 (aged 20)	cm / kg	13	2				
