= Takumi Motohashi =

Japanese footballer

Takumi Motohashi 本橋 卓巳
Personal information
- Full name: Takumi Motohashi
- Date of birth: August 3, 1982 (age 44)
- Place of birth: Nishitokyo, Tokyo, Japan
- Height: 1.81 m (5 ft 11 1/2 in)
- Position: Midfielder

Youth career
- 1998–2000: Funabashi High School

Senior career*
Years	Team	Apps	(Gls)
2001–2003	Yokohama F. Marinos	1	(0)
2002	→Shonan Bellmare (loan)	15	(1)
2004	Sagan Tosu	40	(3)
2005–2008	Montedio Yamagata	83	(4)
2009–2013	Tochigi SC	80	(2)
Total		219	(10)
Medal record
Yokohama F. Marinos
Winner	J1 League	2003
Winner	J.League Cup	2001
- * Club domestic league appearances and goals

Takumi Motohashi (本橋 卓巳, Motohashi Takumi; born August 3, 1982) is a former Japanese football player.

== Playing career ==
Motohashi was born in Nishitokyo on August 3, 1982. After graduating from high school, he joined J1 League club Yokohama F. Marinos in 2001. However he could not play at all in the match. In 2002, he moved to J2 League club Shonan Bellmare on loan and played as offensive midfielder. In 2003, he returned to Yokohama F. Marinos. However he could hardly play in the match. In 2004, he moved to J2 club Sagan Tosu. He played many matches as regular player. In 2005, he moved to J2 club Montedio Yamagata. He played as regular player. However his opportunity to play decreased from 2006. Although the club was promoted to J1 end of 2008, he moved to J2 club Tochigi SC end of 2008 season without playing J1. He played many matches as regular player in 2009. However his opportunity to play decreased from 2010 and he could not play many matches from 2012. He retired end of 2013 season.

== Career statistics ==
Appearances and goals by club, season and competition
Club	Season	League			Emperor's Cup		J.League Cup		Total	
Club	Season	Division	Apps	Goals	Apps	Goals	Apps	Goals	Apps	Goals
Yokohama F. Marinos	2001	J1 League	0	0	0	0	0	0	0	0
Shonan Bellmare	2002	J2 League	15	1	3	0	—		18	1
Yokohama F. Marinos	2003	J1 League	1	0	1	0	1	0	3	0
Sagan Tosu	2004	J2 League	40	3	2	0	—		42	3
Montedio Yamagata	2005	J2 League	38	3	1	0	—		39	3
Montedio Yamagata	2006	J2 League	17	1	0	0	—		17	1
Montedio Yamagata	2007	J2 League	21	0	2	1	—		23	1
Montedio Yamagata	2008	J2 League	7	0	1	0	—		8	0
Tochigi SC	2009	J2 League	33	1	1	0	—		34	1
Tochigi SC	2010	J2 League	24	0	2	0	—		26	0
Tochigi SC	2011	J2 League	12	1	1	0	—		13	1
Tochigi SC	2012	J2 League	4	0	0	0	—		4	0
Tochigi SC	2013	J2 League	7	0	0	0	—		7	0
Career total			219	10	14	1	1	0	234	11
