= 2017 Tochigi SC season =

Tochigi SC
2017 season
- Manager: Yuji Yokoyama
- Stadium: Tochigi Green Stadium
- J3 League: 2nd
Home colours	Away colours

2017 Tochigi SC season.

== League table ==
Pos	Team	Pld	W	D	L	GF	GA	GD	Pts	Promotion
1	Blaublitz Akita (C)	32	18	7	7	53	31	+22	61	Ineligible for promotion
2	Tochigi SC (P)	32	16	12	4	44	24	+20	60	Promotion to 2018 J2 League (Note: Only teams that hold a J2 license are eligible for promotion.)
3	Azul Claro Numazu	32	16	11	5	60	27	+33	59	Ineligible for promotion
4	Kagoshima United	32	17	4	11	49	37	+12	55	Ineligible for promotion
5	Nagano Parceiro	32	13	11	8	34	25	+9	50	

Source: 2017 MEIJI YASUDA J3 LEAGUE League table
Rules for classification: 1) Points; 2) Goal difference; 3) Goals scored; 4th) head-to-head results; 5th) disciplinary points; 6th) draw
(C) Champions; (P) Promoted

== J3 League ==
Match	Date	Team	Score	Team	Venue	Attendance
1	2017.03.12	Tochigi SC	0-0	FC Ryukyu	Tochigi Green Stadium	4,812
2	2017.03.19	Gainare Tottori	1-1	Tochigi SC	Tottori Bank Bird Stadium	2,435
3	2017.03.25	Tochigi SC	1-0	YSCC Yokohama	Tochigi Green Stadium	2,758
4	2017.04.02	Fujieda MYFC	2-2	Tochigi SC	Fujieda Soccer Stadium	1,402
5	2017.04.16	Tochigi SC	2-1	Azul Claro Numazu	Tochigi Green Stadium	3,591
6	2017.04.29	Cerezo Osaka U-23	0-1	Tochigi SC	Yanmar Stadium Nagai	951
7	2017.05.07	Tochigi SC	0-0	Giravanz Kitakyushu	Tochigi Green Stadium	4,459
8	2017.05.13	FC Tokyo U-23	0-1	Tochigi SC	Ajinomoto Field Nishigaoka	884
9	2017.05.21	Tochigi SC	2-1	Fukushima United FC	Tochigi Green Stadium	4,120
10	2017.05.28	SC Sagamihara	1-0	Tochigi SC	Sagamihara Gion Stadium	3,362
11	2017.06.04	Tochigi SC	0-1	Blaublitz Akita	Tochigi Green Stadium	3,632
12	2017.06.11	Grulla Morioka	1-2	Tochigi SC	Iwagin Stadium	1,451
13	2017.06.17	Tochigi SC	2-1	Kagoshima United FC	Tochigi Green Stadium	5,041
15	2017.07.02	Gamba Osaka U-23	3-2	Tochigi SC	Suita City Football Stadium	1,043
16	2017.07.08	Tochigi SC	1-1	Kataller Toyama	Tochigi Green Stadium	6,320
17	2017.07.15	AC Nagano Parceiro	0-0	Tochigi SC	Minami Nagano Sports Park Stadium	8,049
18	2017.07.22	Tochigi SC	1-0	SC Sagamihara	Tochigi Green Stadium	4,355
19	2017.08.19	YSCC Yokohama	0-2	Tochigi SC	NHK Spring Mitsuzawa Football Stadium	1,264
20	2017.08.26	Tochigi SC	3-2	Grulla Morioka	Tochigi Green Stadium	4,226
21	2017.09.03	Blaublitz Akita	1-1	Tochigi SC	Akigin Stadium	2,461
22	2017.09.09	Kagoshima United FC	1-5	Tochigi SC	Kagoshima Kamoike Stadium	3,818
23	2017.09.16	Tochigi SC	2-0	Gamba Osaka U-23	Tochigi Green Stadium	11,191
24	2017.09.23	Tochigi SC	4-1	FC Tokyo U-23	Tochigi Green Stadium	6,296
25	2017.10.01	Kataller Toyama	1-2	Tochigi SC	Toyama Stadium	4,014
27	2017.10.14	Tochigi SC	1-0	Cerezo Osaka U-23	Tochigi Green Stadium	3,633
28	2017.10.22	Fukushima United FC	0-2	Tochigi SC	Toho Stadium	1,456
29	2017.10.29	Tochigi SC	0-0	Fujieda MYFC	Tochigi Green Stadium	2,793
30	2017.11.05	Giravanz Kitakyushu	3-2	Tochigi SC	Mikuni World Stadium Kitakyushu	4,182
31	2017.11.11	FC Ryukyu	0-0	Tochigi SC	Okinawa Athletic Park Stadium	1,826
32	2017.11.19	Tochigi SC	1-1	Gainare Tottori	Tochigi Green Stadium	6,880
33	2017.11.26	Tochigi SC	0-0	AC Nagano Parceiro	Tochigi Green Stadium	8,245
34	2017.12.03	Azul Claro Numazu	1-1	Tochigi SC	Ashitaka Park Stadium	8,649
