= Hiroyuki Takeda =

Japanese footballer (born 1983)

Hiroyuki Takeda 武田 博行
Personal information
- Full name: Hiroyuki Takeda
- Date of birth: November 30, 1983 (age 42)
- Place of birth: Kobe, Hyogo, Japan
- Height: 1.86 m (6 ft 1 in)
- Position: Goalkeeper

Youth career
- 1999–2001: Ashiya High School

Senior career*
| Years | Team | Apps | (Gls) |
| 2002–2007 | Mito HollyHock | 64 | (0) |
| 2008–2012 | Tochigi SC | 82 | (0) |
| 2013 | Giravanz Kitakyushu | 40 | (0) |
| 2014–2016 | Cerezo Osaka | 4 | (0) |
| 2016 | → Cerezo Osaka U-23 (loan) | 12 | (0) |
| 2017–2018 | Tokyo Verdy | 0 | (0) |
| 2019– | FC Tiamo Hirakata | 13 | (0) |

Managerial career
- 2022: Tiamo Hirakata
- * Club domestic league appearances and goals as of 1 January 2020

Hiroyuki Takeda (武田 博行, Takeda Hiroyuki; born November 30, 1983) is a Japanese former football player. He last plays and manager for FC Tiamo Hirakata.

== Playing career ==
Takeda was born in Kobe on November 30, 1983. After graduating from high school, he joined J2 League club Mito HollyHock in 2002. He could not play many matches behind Koji Homma until 2005. In 2006, he played many matches instead Homma was injured. However he could not become a regular goalkeeper. In 2008, he moved to Japan Football League club Tochigi SC. Although he could not play at all in the match, Tochigi was promoted to J2 end of 2008 season. His opportunity to play increased from 2010. In 2013, he moved to J2 club Giravanz Kitakyushu and played many matches as regular goalkeeper. In 2014, he moved to J1 League club Cerezo Osaka.

However he could hardly play in the match behind Kim Jin-hyeon. Cerezo was also relegated to J2 end of 2014 season. In 2017, he moved to J2 club Tokyo Verdy. However he could not play at all in the match in 2 seasons. In 2019, he moved to Regional Leagues club FC Tiamo Hirakata.

== Managerial career ==
In 2022, Takeda was appointed manager of the JFL club where he had been playing, Tiamo Hirakata from September. He was replaced before the 2023 season, taking the position of goalkeeper coach for the team.

== Career statistics ==
As of 1 January 2020.

| Club performance | | | League | | Cup | | League Cup | | Total | |
| Season | Club | League | Apps | Goals | Apps | Goals | Apps | Goals | Apps | Goals |
| Japan | | | League | | Emperor's Cup | | J.League Cup | | Total | |
|---|---|---|---|---|---|---|---|---|---|---|
| 2002 | Mito HollyHock | J2 League | 0 | 0 | 0 | 0 | - | | 0 | 0 |
| 2003 | Mito HollyHock | J2 League | 0 | 0 | 0 | 0 | - | | 0 | 0 |
| 2004 | Mito HollyHock | J2 League | 14 | 0 | 1 | 0 | - | | 15 | 0 |
| 2005 | Mito HollyHock | J2 League | 3 | 0 | 0 | 0 | - | | 3 | 0 |
| 2006 | Mito HollyHock | J2 League | 35 | 0 | 0 | 0 | - | | 35 | 0 |
| 2007 | Mito HollyHock | J2 League | 12 | 0 | 0 | 0 | - | | 12 | 0 |
| Total | | | 64 | 0 | 1 | 0 | - | | 65 | 0 |
| 2008 | Tochigi SC | JFL | 0 | 0 | 0 | 0 | - | | 0 | 0 |
| 2009 | Tochigi SC | J2 League | 5 | 0 | 0 | 0 | - | | 5 | 0 |
| 2010 | Tochigi SC | J2 League | 17 | 0 | 1 | 0 | - | | 18 | 0 |
| 2011 | Tochigi SC | J2 League | 25 | 0 | 1 | 0 | - | | 26 | 0 |
| 2012 | Tochigi SC | J2 League | 35 | 0 | 0 | 0 | - | | 35 | 0 |
| Total | | | 82 | 0 | 2 | 0 | - | | 84 | 0 |
| 2013 | Giravanz Kitakyushu | J2 League | 40 | 0 | 1 | 0 | - | | 41 | 0 |
| Total | | | 40 | 0 | 1 | 0 | - | | 41 | 0 |
| 2014 | Cerezo Osaka | J1 League | 4 | 0 | 0 | 0 | 2 | 0 | 6 | 0 |
| 2015 | Cerezo Osaka | J2 League | 0 | 0 | 1 | 0 | - | | 1 | 0 |
| 2016 | Cerezo Osaka | J2 League | 0 | 0 | 0 | 0 | - | | 0 | 0 |
| Total | | | 4 | 0 | 1 | 0 | 2 | 0 | 7 | 0 |
| 2016 | Cerezo Osaka U-23 | J3 League | 12 | 0 | - | | - | | 12 | 0 |
| Total | | | 12 | 0 | - | | - | | 12 | 0 |
| 2017 | Tokyo Verdy | J2 League | 0 | 0 | 0 | 0 | - | | 0 | 0 |
| 2018 | Tokyo Verdy | J2 League | 0 | 0 | 0 | 0 | - | | 0 | 0 |
| Total | | | 0 | 0 | 0 | 0 | - | | 0 | 0 |
| 2019 | FC Tiamo Hirakata | JRL (Kansai) | 13 | 0 | 0 | 0 | - | | 13 | 0 |
| Total | | | 13 | 0 | 0 | 0 | - | | 13 | 0 |
| Career total | | | 215 | 0 | 5 | 0 | 2 | 0 | 222 | 0 |
