= Masaki Saito =

Masaki Saito may refer to:

- Masaki Saito (baseball) (斎藤 雅樹, born 1965), Japanese baseball player
- Masaki Saito (footballer) (齋藤 将基, born 1980), Japanese footballer
- Masaki Saito (chef), Michelin starred chef in Toronto
