= Yasumichi =

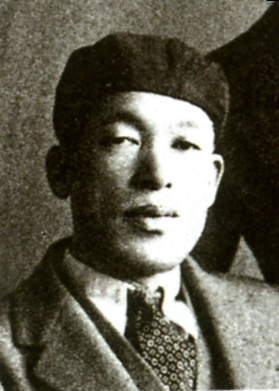
- Yasumichi Sugiyama (1889–1936), pen name: Kyusaku Yumeno. Japanese author
- Pronunciation: jasɯmitɕi (IPA)
- Gender: Male

Origin
- Origin: Japanese
- Meaning: Different meanings depending on the kanji used

Other names
- Alternative spelling: Yasumiti (Kunrei-shiki) Yasumiti (Nihon-shiki) Yasumichi (Hepburn)

Yasumichi is a masculine Japanese given name.

== Written forms ==
Yasumichi can be written using different combinations of kanji characters. Here are some examples:

- 靖道, "peaceful, way"
- 靖路, "peaceful, route"
- 靖通, "peaceful, pass through"
- 康道, "healthy, way"
- 康路, "healthy, route"
- 康通, "healthy, pass through"
- 安道, "tranquil, way"
- 安通, "tranquil, pass through"
- 保道, "preserve, way"
- 保路, "preserve, route"
- 保通, "preserve, pass through"
- 泰道, "peaceful, way"
- 泰路, "peaceful, route"
- 易道, "divination, way"

The name can also be written in hiragana やすみち or katakana ヤスミチ.

== Notable people with the name ==
- Yasumichi Kushida (櫛田 泰道; 1976–2023), Japanese voice actor
- Yasumichi Morita (森田 恭通; born 1967), Japanese interior designer
- Yasumichi Nijo (二条 康道; 1607–1666), Japanese kugyō
- Yasumichi Sugiyama (杉山 泰道, 1889–1936), pen name: Kyusaku Yumeno (夢野 久作), Japanese author
- Yasumichi Uchima (内間 安路; born 1984), Japanese footballer
