= Fukudai =

Fukudai may refer to:

- Fukuoka University, a private university in Fukuoka Prefecture, Japan
- Fukushima University, a national university in Japan
- Fukuyama University, a university in Hiroshima, Japan
- University of Fukui, a national university in Fukui Prefecture, Japan
