= Kunihiro =

- Gender: Male

Origin
- Origin: Japanese
- Meaning: Different meanings depending on the kanji used

Kunihiro (written: 邦弘, 邦博, 邦宏, 邦洋, 邦広, 国宏, 訓広 or 九仁広) is a masculine Japanese given name. Notable people with the name include:

- Kunihiro Abe (阿部 邦博; 1968–2018), Japanese animator
- Kunihiro Hasegawa (長谷川 九仁広), Japanese film director
- Kunihiro Iwasaki (岩崎 邦宏; born 1944), Japanese swimmer
- Kunihiro Kawamoto (河本 邦弘; born 1975), Japanese voice actor
- Kunihiro Matsumura (松村 邦洋; born 1967), Japanese comedian
- Kunihiro Miura (三浦 国宏; born 1962), Japanese boxer
- Kunihiro Shibazaki (柴崎 邦博; born 1985), Japanese footballer
- Kunihiro Shimizu (清水 邦広; born 1986), Japanese volleyball player
- Kunihiro Yamashita (山下 訓広; born 1986), Japanese footballer
