= Yuki Matsumoto =

Yuki Matsumoto may refer to:

- Yuki Matsumoto (footballer) (born 1989), Japanese footballer
- Yuki Matsumoto (baseball) (born 1996), Japanese baseball player
