= Shibazaki =

Shibazaki (written: 柴崎) is a Japanese surname. Notable people with the surname include:

- Keiji Shibazaki (柴崎 恵次, 1894–1943), Imperial Japanese Navy admiral
- Kunihiro Shibazaki (柴崎 邦博, born 1985), Japanese footballer
