= BRIC Language Systems =

Online language training company

- Industry: Language; Online Language Training
- Founded: September 7, 2011
- Founder: Ryan McMunn
- Area served: Globally
- Number of employees: 30-50
- Website: BRIC Language Systems

BRIC Language Systems is an online language training company based in New York City, NY. BRIC specializes in Mandarin Chinese, Brazilian Portuguese, and Spanish language training. The classes are taught by native speakers of each language who live in China, Brazil, and Mexico via online video conferencing.

The teaching content was developed exclusively for BRIC and is interactive, on-screen, and customizable to the needs and interests of each student. The teaching content is downloadable and available for sale separately online.

BRIC also offers immersion training in China and internships in both China and Brazil for college students. BRIC has partnered with several US and International Universities on these internships programs.

== History ==
BRIC Language Systems was founded in November, 2011. Its headquarters is located in New York City with operations in Shanghai, China, Mexico City, Mexico, and São Paulo, Brazil. It was founded by Ryan McMunn, an American entrepreneur who started his career in Shanghai at a US-based manufacturing company.

McMunn lived in China for 8 years. After failing to learn Mandarin for several years using different products and techniques, McMunn was introduced to Kassey Wong, the CEO of Top Mandarin. Within six months he was speaking Mandarin fluently and negotiating business deals in Chinese.

In 2011, McMunn moved from Shanghai to New York. At this time Ms. Wong proposed setting up an online Mandarin Chinese school using teachers in China to teach students worldwide. McMunn loved the idea of using technology to bring Wong's teaching method to young professionals and international business people. He quickly began working on setting up Spanish and Brazilian Portuguese programs and on September 7, 2011 BRIC Language Systems received its Certificate of Formation in the state of Delaware.

In the summer of 2015, BRIC began its internship placement programs in China and Brazil. In 2016, McMunn signed a contract with University of Colorado to provide internships in China and Brazil to students for university credits. This was the beginning of their partnerships with several US and international universities.

== Partners ==
- University of Colorado Boulder

== Products and Services ==
BRIC Language Systems offers private and group Mandarin, Spanish, and Brazilian Portuguese courses. The courses are all taught by actual teachers using online video-conferencing. Each class is recorded so that the student can review the material they learned during class. The courses are customized to the students’ needs and interests and include cultural sensitivity training.

BRIC also offers internship placement services in China and Brazil. BRIC is able to place students in both paid and unpaid internships in most industries in both countries. The services include securing interviews, internship placement in the appropriate industry, online language training, face to face language training, resume assistance, interview preparation, housing, visa assistance, cultural adaptation, networking events, and 24/7 support. One such instance of a specified service offered is when BRIC worked with Shanghai Normal University's School of Business and Finance to provide a business and Mandarin course from 2012 to 2014.

== Media ==
Ryan McMunn has contributed articles to Entrepreneur.com and The Huffington Post. BRIC Language Systems, the company he founded, has been featured in various media outlets.

== Awards ==
- Owler Hot in 2015 NYC
- Owler Hot in 2016 NYC
- Entrepreneur 360: THE BEST ENTREPRENEURIAL COMPANIES IN AMERICA
- 2018 Corporate Immigration & Relocation Awards Recipient of the Best Online Language Training Company 2018

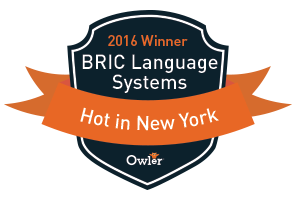
Owler Hot in 2016
