= Hande Cilingir =

- Education: London School of Economics (BSc); Shanghai Normal University(MSc)
- Occupation: Businesswoman
- Title: CEO of Insider One

Hande Cilingir is a Turkish businesswoman. She is a co-founder and the chief executive officer of Insider One, a software as a service (SaaS) company that was founded in 2012 and is headquartered in New York. In 2022, the company reached a valuation above one billion dollars.

== Early life and education ==
Cilingir is from Mudanya, in Bursa Province, Turkey. She studied at the London School of Economics, where she completed her undergraduate degree. Cilingir later earned a master's degree at Shanghai Normal University in China. While pursuing her postgraduate studies in China, Cilingir held operational roles at multinational corporations, including Vestel and PepsiCo.

== Career ==
Prior to Insider One, Cilingir and her co-founder, Serhat Soyuerel, started English and More, an English-language school in Fethiye in 2009, which they later exited.

Cilingir co-founded Insider in 2012 with Serhat Soyuerel, Mehmet Sinan Toktay, Muharrem Derinkök and Okan Yedibela, and became its chief executive officer. The company develops software that allows brands combine customer data across channels and deliver personalised marketing. The company expanded its operations into Japan in 2017, and later into Europe, North America and Latin America.

The company raised funding from investors including Sequoia Capital, which led an $11 million round in 2018, and Riverwood Capital, which led a $32 million round in 2020. In March 2022, it raised $121 million in a round led by the Qatar Investment Authority reaching a valuation of about $1.2 billion. An additional $105 million followed in 2023, and in November 2024, the company raised $500 million in a round led by General Atlantic, bringing its total funding to more than $772 million, with operations reported in 28 countries.

In 2026, by then operating as Insider One, the company acquired Bluecore, a retail marketing-technology firm, in a transaction that reports linked to a planned public offering.

== Recognition ==
In 2014, Cilingir was selected as an Endeavor Entrepreneur. In 2016, she was awarded Woman Entrepreneur of the Year by Microsoft. In 2018, she was listed by Crunchbase among the top-ranked women chief executives based outside the United States and received Endeavor's Lindas awards in 2020.
