= Masayuki Ochiai (footballer) =

Japanese footballer

Masayuki Ochiai 落合 正幸
Personal information
- Full name: Masayuki Ochiai
- Date of birth: July 11, 1981 (age 45)
- Place of birth: Uki, Kumamoto, Japan
- Height: 1.80 m (5 ft 11 in)
- Positions: Defender; midfielder

Youth career
- 1997–1999: Ozu High School

Senior career*
Years	Team	Apps	(Gls)
2000–2006	Kashiwa Reysol	25	(0)
2004–2005	→Sagan Tosu (loan)	23	(0)
2007	Kawasaki Frontale	9	(0)
2008–2011	Tochigi SC	78	(3)
Total		135	(3)
Medal record
Kawasaki Frontale
Runner-up	J.League Cup	2007
- * Club domestic league appearances and goals

Masayuki Ochiai (落合 正幸, Ochiai Masayuki; born July 11, 1981) is a Japanese former football player.

== Playing career ==
Ochiai was born in Uki on July 11, 1981. After graduating from high school, he joined J1 League club Kashiwa Reysol in 2000. On November 23, 2002, he debuted as defensive midfielder against Sanfrecce Hiroshima. Although he played many matches as defensive midfielder in 2003, he could hardly play in the match in 2004. In September 2004, he moved to J2 League club Sagan Tosu on loan. He became a regular player as defensive midfielder. However he lost his regular position in April 2005 and he could hardly play in the match after that. In 2006, he returned to Kashiwa Reysol was relegated to J2 from 2006. However he could not play many matches. In 2007, he moved to J1 club Kawasaki Frontale. However he could not play many matches. In 2008, he moved to Japan Football League club Tochigi SC. He became a regular player and the club was promoted to J2 from 2008. Although he also played many matches as center back not only defensive midfielder until 2009, his opportunity to play decreased from 2010. He retired end of 2011 season.

== Club statistics ==
Club performance			League		Cup		League Cup		Continental		Total	
Season	Club	League	Apps	Goals	Apps	Goals	Apps	Goals	Apps	Goals	Apps	Goals
Japan			League		Emperor's Cup		J.League Cup		Asia		Total	
2000	Kashiwa Reysol	J1 League	0	0	0	0	0	0	-		0	0
2001	Kashiwa Reysol	J1 League	0	0	0	0	0	0	-		0	0
2002	Kashiwa Reysol	J1 League	1	0	1	0	0	0	-		2	0
2003	Kashiwa Reysol	J1 League	9	0	1	0	1	0	-		11	0
2004	Kashiwa Reysol	J1 League	2	0	0	0	0	0	-		2	0
2004	Sagan Tosu	J2 League	12	0	2	0	-		-		14	0
2005	Sagan Tosu	J2 League	11	0	0	0	-		-		11	0
2006	Kashiwa Reysol	J2 League	13	0	2	0	-		-		15	0
2007	Kawasaki Frontale	J1 League	9	0	0	0	2	0	4	0	15	0
2008	Tochigi SC	Football League	30	3	2	0	-		-		32	3
2009	Tochigi SC	J2 League	33	0	1	0	-		-		34	0
2010	Tochigi SC	J2 League	5	0	1	0	-		-		6	0
2011	Tochigi SC	J2 League	10	0	1	0	-		-		11	0
Career total			135	3	11	0	3	0	4	0	153	3
