= 2013 Tochigi SC season =

Tochigi SC
2013 season
- Manager: Hiroshi Matsuda; Ikuo Matsumoto
- Stadium: Tochigi Green Stadium
- J2 League: 9th
Home colours	Away colours

2013 Tochigi SC season.

== League table ==
Pos	Team	Pld	W	D	L	GF	GA	GD	Pts
7	Matsumoto Yamaga	42	19	9	14	54	54	0	66
8	Consadole Sapporo	42	20	4	18	60	49	+11	64
9	Tochigi SC	42	17	12	13	61	55	+6	63
10	Montedio Yamagata	42	16	11	15	74	61	+13	59
11	Yokohama FC	42	15	13	14	49	46	+3	58

Updated to match(es) played on 8 December 2013. Source: J.League Division 2
Rules for classification: 1) points; 2) goal difference; 3) number of goals scored.

== J2 League ==
Match	Date	Team	Score	Team	Venue	Attendance
1	2013.03.03	Tochigi SC	0-1	Matsumoto Yamaga FC	Tochigi Green Stadium	8,686
2	2013.03.10	Consadole Sapporo	0-1	Tochigi SC	Sapporo Dome	13,248
3	2013.03.17	Tochigi SC	0-0	JEF United Chiba	Tochigi Green Stadium	5,087
4	2013.03.20	Montedio Yamagata	2-1	Tochigi SC	ND Soft Stadium Yamagata	6,011
5	2013.03.24	Gainare Tottori	1-1	Tochigi SC	Tottori Bank Bird Stadium	2,900
6	2013.03.31	Tochigi SC	3-0	Thespakusatsu Gunma	Tochigi Green Stadium	3,030
7	2013.04.07	Kataller Toyama	1-2	Tochigi SC	Toyama Stadium	2,315
8	2013.04.14	Tochigi SC	0-1	Mito HollyHock	Tochigi Green Stadium	4,606
9	2013.04.17	Tokushima Vortis	0-1	Tochigi SC	Pocarisweat Stadium	2,325
10	2013.04.21	Tochigi SC	2-0	FC Gifu	Tochigi Green Stadium	2,103
11	2013.04.28	Giravanz Kitakyushu	0-2	Tochigi SC	Honjo Stadium	2,628
12	2013.05.03	Tochigi SC	1-0	Fagiano Okayama	Tochigi Green Stadium	4,702
13	2013.05.06	Ehime FC	3-0	Tochigi SC	Ningineer Stadium	2,413
14	2013.05.12	Tochigi SC	2-2	V-Varen Nagasaki	Tochigi Green Stadium	3,686
15	2013.05.19	Roasso Kumamoto	1-4	Tochigi SC	Kumamoto Suizenji Stadium	3,381
16	2013.05.26	Tochigi SC	0-0	Yokohama FC	Tochigi Green Stadium	8,003
17	2013.06.01	Gamba Osaka	3-0	Tochigi SC	Expo '70 Commemorative Stadium	12,633
18	2013.06.08	Tochigi SC	2-0	Avispa Fukuoka	Tochigi Green Stadium	3,429
19	2013.06.15	Tochigi SC	2-2	Vissel Kobe	Tochigi Green Stadium	6,114
20	2013.06.22	Tokyo Verdy	3-3	Tochigi SC	Ajinomoto Stadium	4,210
21	2013.06.29	Tochigi SC	2-2	Kyoto Sanga FC	Tochigi Green Stadium	4,784
22	2013.07.03	Yokohama FC	3-1	Tochigi SC	NHK Spring Mitsuzawa Football Stadium	2,812
23	2013.07.07	Tochigi SC	1-1	Kataller Toyama	Tochigi Green Stadium	4,503
24	2013.07.14	Avispa Fukuoka	2-0	Tochigi SC	Level5 Stadium	4,892
25	2013.07.20	Tochigi SC	0-1	Roasso Kumamoto	Tochigi Green Stadium	4,676
27	2013.08.04	Vissel Kobe	2-0	Tochigi SC	Noevir Stadium Kobe	9,198
28	2013.08.11	Mito HollyHock	4-3	Tochigi SC	K's denki Stadium Mito	5,195
29	2013.08.18	Tochigi SC	1-1	Gainare Tottori	Tochigi Green Stadium	5,579
30	2013.08.21	Tochigi SC	1-1	Montedio Yamagata	Tochigi Green Stadium	3,155
31	2013.08.25	Fagiano Okayama	1-3	Tochigi SC	Kanko Stadium	8,046
32	2013.09.01	Tochigi SC	0-1	Tokushima Vortis	Tochigi Green Stadium	2,742
26	2013.09.11	Tochigi SC	0-1	Ehime FC	Tochigi Green Stadium	2,499
33	2013.09.15	Tochigi SC	4-3	Consadole Sapporo	Tochigi Green Stadium	4,340
34	2013.09.22	Thespakusatsu Gunma	0-1	Tochigi SC	Shoda Shoyu Stadium Gunma	3,706
35	2013.09.29	Matsumoto Yamaga FC	2-2	Tochigi SC	Matsumotodaira Park Stadium	9,933
36	2013.10.06	Tochigi SC	4-2	Gamba Osaka	Tochigi Green Stadium	10,687
37	2013.10.20	Tochigi SC	4-2	Tokyo Verdy	Tochigi Green Stadium	4,278
38	2013.10.27	FC Gifu	0-1	Tochigi SC	Gifu Nagaragawa Stadium	3,830
39	2013.11.03	V-Varen Nagasaki	2-0	Tochigi SC	Nagasaki Stadium	5,259
40	2013.11.10	Tochigi SC	3-2	Giravanz Kitakyushu	Tochigi Green Stadium	6,671
41	2013.11.17	JEF United Chiba	1-1	Tochigi SC	Fukuda Denshi Arena	11,253
42	2013.11.24	Kyoto Sanga FC	1-2	Tochigi SC	Kyoto Nishikyogoku Athletic Stadium	10,500
