= Atsushi Yoneyama =

Japanese footballer

Atsushi Yoneyama 米山 篤志
Personal information
- Full name: Atsushi Yoneyama
- Date of birth: November 20, 1976 (age 49)
- Place of birth: Utsunomiya, Tochigi, Japan
- Height: 1.80 m (5 ft 11 in)
- Position: Defender

Youth career
- 1992–1994: Toin Gakuen High School
- 1995–1997: Komazawa University

Senior career*
Years	Team	Apps	(Gls)
1998–2005	Tokyo Verdy	198	(10)
2006	Kawasaki Frontale	7	(0)
2007–2008	Nagoya Grampus	39	(1)
2009–2010	Tochigi SC	54	(0)
Total		298	(11)

International career
2000	Japan	1	(0)

Managerial career
- 2012–2014: Tokyo 23
- 2023–2025: Kamatamare Sanuki
- 2026: Tochigi SC
Medal record
Tokyo Verdy
Winner	Emperor's Cup	2004
Kawasaki Frontale
Runner-up	J1 League	2006
- * Club domestic league appearances and goals

Atsushi Yoneyama (米山 篤志, Yoneyama Atsushi; born November 20, 1976) is a former Japanese football player and manager who played once for the Japan national team.

== Club career ==
Yoneyama was born in Utsunomiya on November 20, 1976. When he was a Komazawa University student, he joined Verdy Kawasaki (later Tokyo Verdy) in 1998. He became a regular player as center-back among the teams where generations change. In 2004, the club won the J.League Cup. However, the club was relegated to the J2 League in 2005. He moved to Kawasaki Frontale in 2006. However, there was only a few opportunities to play, so he moved to Nagoya Grampus Eight (later Nagoya Grampus) in 2007. In 2009, he moved to his local club Tochigi SC in the J2 League. He left the club at the end of the 2010 season and announced his retirement in November 2011.

== Managerial career ==
In 2012, Yoneyama became the manager of Tokyo 23 FC.

In 22 November 2022, he joined the J3 club, Kamatamare Sanuki as manager, replacing Toshihiro Nishimura for the 2023 season.

== National team career ==
In February 2000, Yoneyama was selected for the Japan national team for the 2000 Asian Cup qualification. At this qualification, on February 16, he debuted against Brunei.

== Club statistics ==
Club performance			League		Cup		League Cup		Total	
Season	Club	League	Apps	Goals	Apps	Goals	Apps	Goals	Apps	Goals
Japan			League		Emperor's Cup		J.League Cup		Total	
1998	Verdy Kawasaki	J1 League	15	0	3	0	2	1	20	1
1999	Verdy Kawasaki	J1 League	29	2	4	1	4	0	37	3
2000	Verdy Kawasaki	J1 League	30	1	2	0	6	0	38	1
2001	Tokyo Verdy	J1 League	21	1	3	1	2	0	26	2
2002	Tokyo Verdy	J1 League	28	2	1	0	6	0	35	3
2003	Tokyo Verdy	J1 League	23	0	2	0	3	0	28	0
2004	Tokyo Verdy	J1 League	29	3	5	1	8	1	42	5
2005	Tokyo Verdy	J1 League	23	1	0	0	2	0	25	1
2006	Kawasaki Frontale	J1 League	7	0	0	0	1	0	8	0
2007	Nagoya Grampus Eight	J1 League	21	0	1	0	2	0	24	0
2008	Nagoya Grampus	J1 League	18	1	1	0	6	0	25	1
2009	Tochigi SC	J2 League	37	0	1	0	-		38	0
2010	Tochigi SC	J2 League	17	0	0	0	-		17	0
Total			298	11	23	3	42	2	363	16

== Managerial statistics ==
As of 22 November 2022.

Managerial record by club and tenure
Team	From	To	Record							
Team	From	To	G	W	D	L	GF	GA	GD	Win %
Kamatamare Sanuki	22 November 2022	present	0	0	0	0	0	0	+0	—
Total			0	0	0	0	0	0	+0	—

== National team statistics ==
Japan national team
Year	Apps	Goals
2000	1	0
Total	1	0
