= Kota Amano =

Japanese footballer

Personal information
- Full name: Kota Amano
- Date of birth: 22 June 1987 (age 39)
- Place of birth: Fujinomiya, Shizuoka, Japan
- Height: 1.70 m (5 ft 7 in)
- Position: Defender

Team information
- Current team: SC Sagamihara
- Number: 2

Youth career
- 2003–2005: Tokoha Gakuen Tachibana High School

College career
Years	Team	Apps	(Gls)
2006–2009	Kokushikan University		

Senior career*
Years	Team	Apps	(Gls)
2010	Thespa Kusatsu U-23		
2011–	SC Sagamihara	85	(3)
- * Club domestic league appearances and goals as of 23 February 2016

Kota Amano (天野 恒太, Amano Kōta; born 22 June 1987 in Fujinomiya, Shizuoka) is a Japanese footballer who plays for SC Sagamihara.

== Club statistics ==
Updated to 23 February 2016.

Club performance			League		Cup		Total	
Season	Club	League	Apps	Goals	Apps	Goals	Apps	Goals
Japan			League		Emperor's Cup		Total	
2011	SC Sagamihara	JRL (Kantō, Div. 2)	2	0	–		2	0
2012	SC Sagamihara	JRL (Kantō, Div. 1)	17	0	–		17	0
2013	SC Sagamihara	JFL	29	2	–		29	2
2014	SC Sagamihara	J3 League	26	0	–		26	0
2015	SC Sagamihara	J3 League	11	1	–		11	1
Career total			85	3	0	0	85	3
