= Yōsuke Kobayashi =

Japanese footballer

Yosuke Kobayashi 小林 陽介
Personal information
- Full name: Yosuke Kobayashi
- Date of birth: May 6, 1983 (age 43)
- Place of birth: Itabashi, Tokyo, Japan
- Height: 1.73 m (5 ft 8 in)
- Position: Forward

Youth career
- 1999–2001: Urawa Reds

Senior career*
Years	Team	Apps	(Gls)
2002–2003	Urawa Reds	0	(0)
2004–2006	Yokogawa Musashino	91	(38)
2007–2008	Roasso Kumamoto	25	(5)
2009–2010	Matsumoto Yamaga FC	30	(12)
2011–2013	Yokogawa Musashino	67	(11)
Total		213	(66)
Medal record
Urawa Reds
Winner	J.League Cup	2003
Runner-up	J.League Cup	2002
- * Club domestic league appearances and goals

Yosuke Kobayashi (小林 陽介, Kobayashi Yōsuke; born May 6, 1983) is a former Japanese football player.

== Playing career ==
Kobayashi was born in Itabashi, Tokyo on May 6, 1983. He joined J1 League club Urawa Reds from youth team in 2002. However he could not play at all in the match. In 2004, he moved to Japan Football League (JFL) club Yokogawa Musashino. He became a regular forward soon and played many matches in 3 seasons. In 2006 season, he scored 23 goals and became a 2nd top scorer. In 2007, he moved to JFL club Rosso Kumamoto (later Roasso Kumamoto). He played many matches and Rosso was promoted to J2 League end of 2007 season. However he could hardly play in the match in 2008 season. In 2009, he moved to Regional Leagues club Matsumoto Yamaga FC. He became a regular forward and Yamaga was promoted to JFL end of 2009 season. In 2011, he re-joined JFL club Yokogawa Musashino. He played as regular forward until 2012 season. However his opportunity to play decreased in 2013 and he retired end of 2013 season.

== Club statistics ==
Club performance			League		Cup		League Cup		Total	
Season	Club	League	Apps	Goals	Apps	Goals	Apps	Goals	Apps	Goals
Japan			League		Emperor's Cup		J.League Cup		Total	
2002	Urawa Reds	J1 League	0	0	0	0	0	0	0	0
2003	Urawa Reds	J1 League	0	0	0	0	0	0	0	0
Total			0	0	0	0	0	0	0	0
2004	Yokogawa Musashino	Football League	29	12	-		-		29	12
2005	Yokogawa Musashino	Football League	29	3	-		-		29	3
2006	Yokogawa Musashino	Football League	33	23	-		-		33	23
Total			91	38	-		-		91	38
2007	Rosso Kumamoto	Football League	22	5	0	0	-		22	5
2008	Roasso Kumamoto	J2 League	3	0	0	0	-		3	0
Total			25	5	0	0	-		25	5
2009	Matsumoto Yamaga FC	Regional Leagues	14	10	3	1	-		17	11
2010	Matsumoto Yamaga FC	Football League	16	2	1	2	-		17	4
Total			30	12	4	3	-		34	15
2011	Yokogawa Musashino	Football League	30	9	-		-		0	0
2012	Yokogawa Musashino	Football League	27	2	4	1	-		31	3
2013	Yokogawa Musashino	Football League	10	0	0	0	-		10	0
Total			67	11	4	1	-		71	12
Career total			213	66	8	4	0	0	221	70
