= Yusuke Sato =

Japanese footballer (born 1977)

Yusuke Sato 佐藤 悠介
Personal information
- Full name: Yusuke Sato
- Date of birth: November 2, 1977 (age 48)
- Place of birth: Kitamoto, Saitama, Japan
- Height: 1.75 m (5 ft 9 in)
- Position: Midfielder

Youth career
- 1993–1995: Omiya Higashi High School

Senior career*
Years	Team	Apps	(Gls)
1996–1997	Nagoya Grampus Eight	0	(0)
1998–1999	Vissel Kobe	4	(0)
2000	Omiya Ardija	11	(0)
2001–2002	Montedio Yamagata	80	(16)
2003–2004	Cerezo Osaka	31	(1)
2005–2006	Shonan Bellmare	85	(13)
2007	Tokyo Verdy	27	(0)
2008–2010	Tochigi SC	62	(19)
Total		300	(49)
Medal record
Nagoya Grampus Eight
Runner-up	J1 League	1996
Cerezo Osaka
Runner-up	Emperor's Cup	2003
- * Club domestic league appearances and goals

Yusuke Sato (佐藤 悠介, Satō Yūsuke; born November 2, 1977) is a former Japanese football player.

== Playing career ==
Sato was born in Kitamoto on November 2, 1977. After graduating from high school, he joined J1 League club Nagoya Grampus Eight in 1996. However he could not play at all in the match until 1997. In 1998, he moved to Vissel Kobe. Although he played several matches as offensive midfielder, he could not play many matches. In 2000, he moved to J2 League club Omiya Ardija based in his local Saitama Prefecture. In 2001, he moved to Montedio Yamagata. He became a regular player and he played many matches in 2 seasons. In 2003, he moved to Cerezo Osaka. In 2005, he moved to Shonan Bellmare. He was converted to defensive midfielder by manager Eiji Ueda and he played as regular player in 2 seasons. In 2007, he moved to Tokyo Verdy. Although the club won the 2nd place and was promoted to J1, he could not become a regular player. In 2008, he moved to Japan Football League club Tochigi SC. He played in all matches as captain and the club was promoted to J2 from 2009 season. However his opportunity to play decreased for injury from 2009 season and he retired end of 2010 season.

== Club statistics ==
Club performance			League		Cup		League Cup		Total	
Season	Club	League	Apps	Goals	Apps	Goals	Apps	Goals	Apps	Goals
Japan			League		Emperor's Cup		J.League Cup		Total	
1996	Nagoya Grampus Eight	J1 League	0	0	0	0	0	0	0	0
1997	Nagoya Grampus Eight	J1 League	0	0	0	0	0	0	0	0
1998	Vissel Kobe	J1 League	2	0	2	0	3	0	7	0
1999	Vissel Kobe	J1 League	2	0	0	0	0	0	2	0
2000	Omiya Ardija	J2 League	11	0	0	0	1	0	12	0
2001	Montedio Yamagata	J2 League	40	7	0	0	2	1	42	8
2002	Montedio Yamagata	J2 League	40	9	0	0	-		40	9
2003	Cerezo Osaka	J1 League	18	1	0	0	1	0	19	1
2004	Cerezo Osaka	J1 League	13	0	0	0	4	0	17	0
2005	Shonan Bellmare	J2 League	40	4	1	0	-		41	4
2006	Shonan Bellmare	J2 League	45	9	2	0	-		47	9
2007	J2 League	Tokyo Verdy	27	0	1	0	-		28	0
2008	Tochigi SC	Football League	30	16	2	1	-		32	17
2009	Tochigi SC	J2 League	16	2	0	0	-		16	2
2010	Tochigi SC	J2 League	16	1	0	0	-		16	1
Career total			300	49	8	1	11	1	319	51
