= Shanghai Normal University =

Public research university in Shanghai, China

- 上海师范大学
- Motto: 厚德 博学 求是 笃行
- Type: Public University
- Established: 1954; 72 years ago
- President: Wen YUAN
- Faculty: 2,917
- Undergraduates: 21,256
- Postgraduates: 8,662
- Location: Shanghai, China
- Campus: Xuhui Campus Fengxian Campus 1,530,000 m^{2} (16,500,000 sq ft) altogether
- Nickname: 上海师大/上师大
- Website: www.shnu.edu.cn

Shanghai Normal University
- Simplified Chinese: 上海师范大学
- Traditional Chinese: 上海師範大學
Transcriptions
Standard Mandarin
- Hanyu Pinyin: Shànghǎi Shīfàn Dàxué

Shanghai Normal University (SHNU) (Chinese: 上海师范大学) is a public research university in Shanghai, China. SHNU is one of the three key universities (上海市重点大学) in Shanghai, alongside Shanghai University and University of Shanghai for Science and Technology, which are strongly supported by the Shanghai Municipal Government.

SHNU is a comprehensive university with salient features of teacher training and a particular strength in liberal arts. SHNU is participating in the education reform in Shanghai (上海市教育综合改革) and it is also jointly-supported and built by the Ministry of Education of the People's Republic of China and Shanghai Municipal Government (省部共建). SHNU is also among Plan 111 (111计划), National Construction of High-level University Public Graduate Project (国家建设高水平大学公派研究生项目), and Chinese Institutions Admitting International Students under Chinese Government Scholarship Programs (中国政府奖学金来华留学生接收院校).

SHNU is also one of the sixteen members of Shanghai-Hong Kong Universities Alliance (沪港大学联盟).

== History ==
Founded in 1954, SHNU was then named Shanghai Teachers Training College. In 1956 it was expanded into two colleges, Shanghai No. 1 Teachers College and Shanghai No. 2 Teachers College. Two years later, the two colleges were combined to form Shanghai Teachers College. In 1981, SHNU became the first batch of Chinese universities approved to confer master's degrees, and in 1986, SHNU won the qualifications to admit doctor's degree candidates.

From 1972 to 1978, it was known as Shanghai Normal University after combining 4 other universities. In 1978, it was restored to Shanghai Teachers College and was renamed as Shanghai Teachers University in 1984. It combined with Shanghai Teachers College of Technology in October 1994 to form a new Shanghai Teachers University, whose official English name was changed to Shanghai Normal University (SHNU) in May 2003. From September 1997 to August 2003, the university took in successively the following units as its subordinates: Shanghai Teacher Training College, Department of Human Sanitation and Health of Huangling Teacher School, Shanghai Xingzhi Art School, and Shanghai Tourism Institute. Also located in SHNU are, among others, Shanghai Teachers Training Center, Shanghai College Teachers Training Center, and the Editorial Department of Academic Abstracts of Liberal Arts of College Journals.

== Talent cultivation ==
Currently, SHNU has an enrollment of about 20,000 undergraduate students, 8,000 graduate students, and 2700 international students. The university has established cooperation and exchange relationships with 311 universities and cultural and academic institutions in 40 countries and regions. The school has 10 Chinese-foreign cooperatively-run degree programs supported by SHNU and universities from USA, UK, Germany, the Netherlands, Russia, and France. For example, SHNU offers dual degree programs with the cooperation of US Universities such as University of Dayton, Colorado State University, University of Georgia, University of Wyoming, Chapman University, and University of Kansas.

== Colleges and schools ==
SHNU includes the following colleges:

- College of Humanities and Communications
- College of Education
- College of Philosophy and Political Sciences
- Marxism College
- Foreign Languages College
- Business College
- Music College
- College of Fine Arts
- Film and Television Art College
- International College of Chinese Studies
- College of Tourism
- Mathematics and Science College
- Life and Environment Science College
- College of Information, Mechanical and Electronic Engineering
- College of Civil Engineering
- College of Physical Education
- College of Further Education

== Disciplines and majors ==
The university offers 88 undergraduate majors related to 11 subjects, covering Philosophy, Economics, Law, Education, Literature, History, Science, Engineering, Management Science, Agriculture and Art. In addition, the major of Chinese Language and Literature was authorized by the Ministry of Education for talent cultivation and academic research; and the major of Literature of Ancient China serves as one of the four key bases in the country.

In 2005, Shanghai Municipal Education Commission launched the Undergraduate Educational Highland project, and five SHNU majors — MICE Economy, Teacher Education, Chinese Language and Literature, Film and TV Communication and English — were selected as key programs of this project. In 2015, 9 major subjects were ranked by QS subject-rankings. Based on the Academic Ranking of World Universities (ARWU), SHNU was ranked among the top 100 universities in the world for Mathematics in 2015. Chemistry, Mathematics, Material Science, and Engineering Discipline entered Essential Science Indicators (ESI) Top 1%. According to an analytical report on CSSCI publishing among Chinese universities by China's Ministry of Education, SHNU ranks 28th for the total number of Chinese Social Sciences Citation Index(CSSCI) papers published in 2018. In Shanghai, SHNU ranks 4th for the same item, only behind East China Normal University, Fudan University, and Shanghai Jiaotong University. In 2018, 476 papers were published by SHNU authors: 26 papers from China Social Sciences, Literature Review and History Review, etc. Besides, 42 papers were published in SSCI and A&HCI. Currently, the university has one national key major subject and 11 municipal key major subjects.

SHNU has 6 primary disciplines and 46 secondary disciplines for doctoral degree programs, 9 mobile post-doctoral research centers, and 203 Master's degree programs. After many years of solid work, the university has set up many subjects with their specific advantages and features. There are influential disciplines in the academic circle such as Chinese Language and Literature, History, Philosophy, Psychology, Pedagogy, Computational Mathematics and Astrophysics; and disciplines that have attracted wide attention in the society such as Art, Advertisement, Tourism Management, MICE Economy, Rare Earth Materials, and Plant Functional Gene. The Urban Culture Research Center is the only key research base of Humanities in municipal universities approved by the Ministry of Education. There are municipal key laboratories in the field of galaxies and cosmology, three E-research institutes of urban culture, computational science and comparative linguistics, and a large number of major subjects in the process of further development at the municipal level or under the supervision of Shanghai Education Commission.

== Faculty and staff ==
SHNU has a faculty and staff of 2,917 people, including 1,920 full-time faculty members. 1105 of the faculty members have been conferred with doctor's degrees. In addition, the university has about 200 part-time employees, including five specially employed academician-level professors and 20 foreign teachers with long-term working contracts.

== Research ==
SHNU much treasures scientific research. In the past four years, the total number of research projects has reached 1756, among which 137 are at the national level and 312 at the provincial or ministerial level. Besides, the research funding has increased every year, reaching 380 million Yuan during the last four years.

From 2005 to 2008, SHNU faculty worked on 233 projects of liberal arts researches at provincial or higher levels, among which 48 by The National Philosophy and Social Sciences Foundation, and 216 projects of science and engineering researches, including 88 projects aided by National Natural Science Foundations and some sub-projects aided by "863" and "973" national projects.

Statistics show that 67 research achievements by SHNU faculties won municipal or above level rewards from 2005 to 2008. In liberal arts, the awards are from National Research Awards for Educational Science, National Research Awards for Humanities and Social Sciences, Shanghai Research Awards for Philosophy and Social Sciences, Shanghai Research Awards for Educational Science respectively.

In sciences and engineering, the research on Amorphous Alloy and Its Catalytic Function won the First Prize of Natural Sciences Awards of National Ministry of Education, and the Study of Cosmic Dynamics and Related Issues won the First Prize of the 2005 Shanghai Awards for Science and Technology Progress.

From 2005 to 2008, SHNU applied for 287 patents of intellectual property, among which 108 patents have been authorized and 20 items of computer software registered.

== Ranking ==
SHNU was ranked No. 84 on 2019 U.S. News & World Report Best Global Universities (Mainland China) and No. 50 on QS World University Rankings: Asia 2019 (Mainland China). SHNU was ranked 801-900 globally in the 2023 Academic Ranking of World Universities (ARWU) Ranking.

== Confucius Institutes ==
With Confucius Institute as a platform, SHNU boasts its special feature and strength in international co-operation and exchanges, aiming to promote Sino-foreign trading relations and economic development through Chinese teaching and study.

After the first overseas Confucius Institute was founded in Fukuyama University in April 2008, SHNU has negotiated with University of Botswana and Kent State University on the matter. Currently, Confucius Institute of Fukuyama University, University of Botswana, and University of Missouri have started relevant classes and outstanding SHNU teachers have been dispatched there.

Through establishing overseas Confucius institutes with institutions of higher education in foreign countries, SHNU contributes a lot to the dissemination of Chinese culture, making the Confucius institutes a bridge of friendship and cross-culture communication connecting Asia, Africa, and America.

== Resources ==
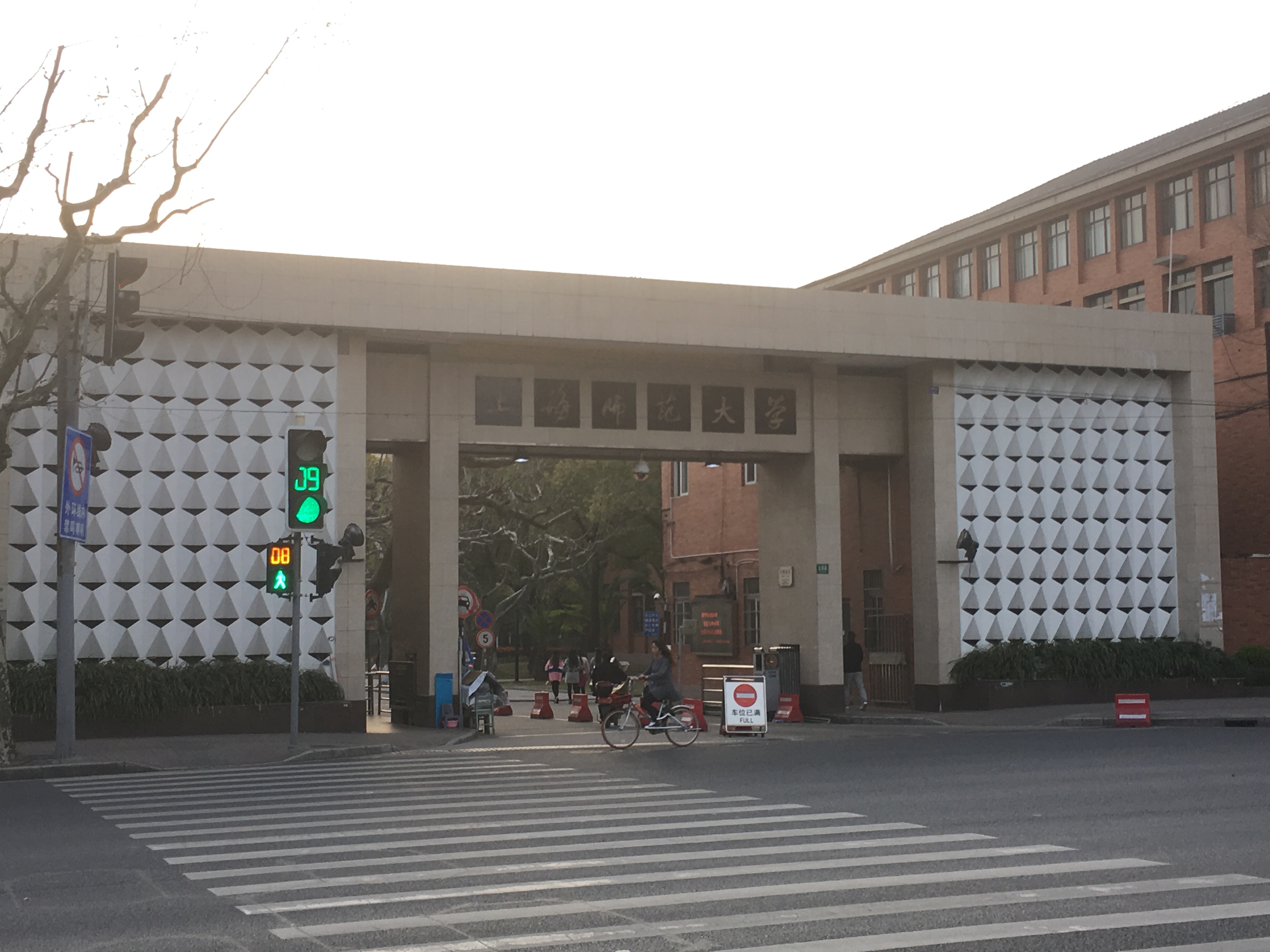
Main Gate of Xuhui Campus

SHNU has two main campuses, Xuhui Campus and Fengxian Campus, covering an area of over 1.53 million square meters. The floor area of the school occupies 650,000 square meters: the classroom area is 67,000 square meters, students' dorm area 239,000 square meters, and indoor school labs and fieldwork space 60,000 square meters.

Two central libraries house 3.25 million books, 21 pieces of databank of electronic books, and four stores of rare or important reference materials. The fixed assets of the whole university are as high as 1.27 billion yuan, among which teaching facilities and research equipment are valued as 315 million yuan.
