= Ryosuke Takayasu =

Japanese footballer

Personal information
- Full name: Ryosuke Takayasu
- Date of birth: May 14, 1984 (age 42)
- Place of birth: Chiba, Japan
- Height: 1.65 m (5 ft 5 in)
- Position: Midfielder

Youth career
- 2003–2006: International Budo University

Senior career*
| Years | Team | Apps | (Gls) |
| 2007–2009 | Tochigi SC | 47 | (5) |
| 2010–2012 | Tochigi Uva FC | 61 | (4) |
| Total | | 108 | (9) |
- * Club domestic league appearances and goals

Ryosuke Takayasu (高安 亮介, Takayasu Ryōsuke; born May 14, 1984) is a former Japanese football midfielder. He played in the J2 League for Tochigi SC in 2009.

== Club statistics ==
| Club performance | | | League | | Cup | | Total | |
| Season | Club | League | Apps | Goals | Apps | Goals | Apps | Goals |
| Japan | | | League | | Emperor's Cup | | Total | |
|---|---|---|---|---|---|---|---|---|
| 2007 | Tochigi SC | Football League | 10 | 0 | 0 | 0 | 10 | 0 |
| 2008 | Tochigi SC | Football League | 19 | 4 | 0 | 0 | 19 | 4 |
| 2009 | Tochigi SC | J2 League | 18 | 1 | 0 | 0 | 18 | 1 |
| 2010 | Tochigi Uva FC | Football League | 17 | 0 | 1 | 0 | 18 | 0 |
| 2011 | Tochigi Uva FC | Football League | | | | | | |
| Country | Japan | | 64 | 5 | 1 | 0 | 65 | 5 |
| Total | | | 64 | 5 | 1 | 0 | 65 | 5 |
