= Ehime University =

Japanese national university

Coordinates: 33°51′00″N 132°46′16″E

- 愛媛大学
- Other name: Aidai
- Type: Public (National)
- Established: May 1949
- President: Hiroshige Nishina
- Faculty: 953 (Teaching Staff)
- Students: 9,419
- Undergraduates: 8,305
- Postgraduates: 1,114
- Location: Matsuyama, Ehime Prefecture, Japan
- Campus: Urban
- Mascot: Emica
- Website: www.ehime-u.ac.jp/en/

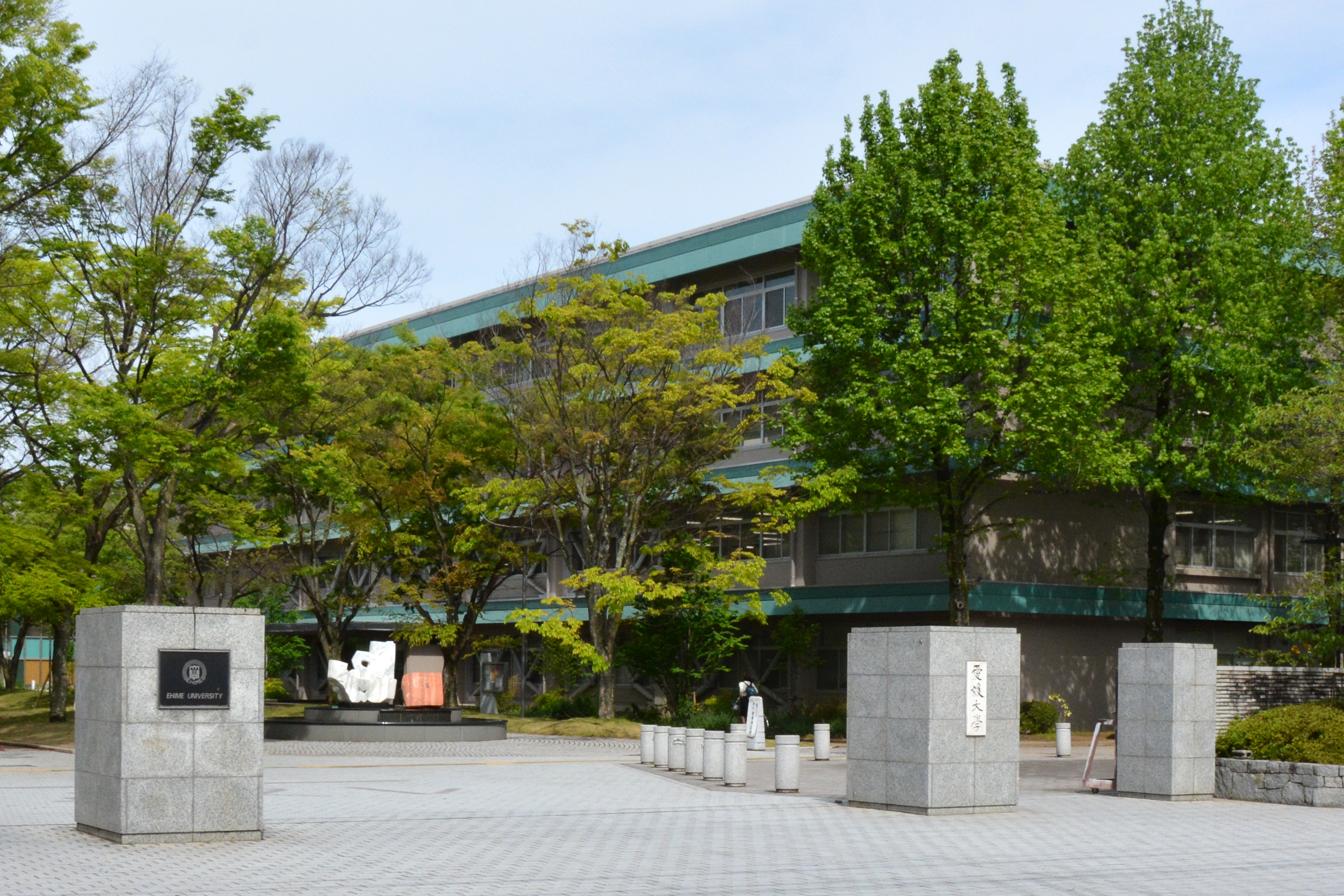

Ehime University (愛媛大学, Ehime Daigaku; abbreviated to 愛大 Aidai) is a Japanese national university in Matsuyama, Ehime Prefecture, Japan. The university has one of the largest student populations in the Shikoku region. After Japan's defeat in World War II, Aidai was established in May 1949 among many other national universities by the Japanese government during the reformation of the education system. The university originally had three Faculties: Humanities and Science, Education, and Engineering; which were consolidated from Matsuyama National High School (established 1919), Ehime Prefectural Teachers School (1876), Ehime Prefectural Youth Teachers School (1927), and Ehime Prefectural Niihama Technical School (1939). Today, the university has six faculties and five graduate schools.

== Faculties ==
Aidai's Faculties include the Faculty of Law and Letters, the Faculty of Education, the Faculty of Collaborative Regional Innovation, the Faculty of Science, the School of Medicine, the Faculty of Engineering, and the Faculty of Agriculture.

== Graduate Schools ==
Graduate School of Law and Letters, Graduate School of Education, Graduate School of Medicine, Graduate School of Science and Engineering, Graduate School of Agriculture, and United Graduate School of Agricultural Science

== Academic programs ==
A selective academic program unique to Aidai is the Super Science Courses (SSC), which accepts a small number of talented students. Students are trained through specially structured coursework that focuses on specialized sciences. SSC students enter one of the three courses: Environmental Sciences, Geoscience, and Biomedical Engineering. Students of SSC can complete their undergraduate education within only three years to advance to graduate studies at Ehime University or elsewhere.

== University and High School Cooperation Project ==
The university has a cooperation project with Ehime Prefectural Matsuyama Minami High School, which is designated as a Super Science High School by the Japanese Ministry of Education, Culture, Sports, Science and Technology (MEXT). In addition, the university is cooperating mainly in the high school in Ehime Prefecture.

== Advanced research centers ==
The university is especially active in science, and is home to the national government designated educational Center of Excellence, the Center for Marine Environment Studies (CMES) and Geodynamics Research Center (GRC). The other research centers include Cell-free Science and Technology Research Center (CSTRC, led by internationally renowned biologist Yaeta Endo), Ehime Proteo-Medicine Research Center, Research Center of Ancient East Asian Iron Culture, and Research Center for Space and Cosmic Evolution.
