= Toshikazu Irie =

Japanese footballer

Personal information
- Full name: Toshikazu Irie
- Date of birth: 11 November 1984 (age 41)
- Place of birth: Tochigi, Japan
- Height: 1.68 m (5 ft 6 in)
- Position: Midfielder

Youth career
- 2000–2002: Yaita Chuo High School

College career
| Years | Team | Apps | (Gls) |
| 2003–2006 | Sakushin Gakuin University | | |

Senior career*
| Years | Team | Apps | (Gls) |
| 2007 | JEF Reserves | 23 | (0) |
| 2008–2011 | Tochigi SC | 90 | (2) |
| 2012 | Gulbene | 15 | (1) |
| 2012–2013 | Górnik Łęczna | 14 | (1) |
| Total | | 142 | (4) |
- * Club domestic league appearances and goals

Toshikazu Irie (入江 利和, Irie Toshikazu; born 11 November 1984) is a Japanese former professional footballer who played as a midfielder.

== Club statistics ==
Appearances and goals by club, season and competition
| Club | Season | League | | | National cup (Note: Includes Emperor's Cup, Latvian Cup, Polish Cup) | | League cup | | Total | |
| Club | Season | Division | Apps | Goals | Apps | Goals | Apps | Goals | Apps | Goals |
|---|---|---|---|---|---|---|---|---|---|---|
| JEF Reserves | 2007 | Football League | 23 | 0 | — | | — | | 23 | 0 |
| Tochigi SC | 2008 | Football League | 7 | 1 | 2 | 0 | — | | 9 | 1 |
| Tochigi SC | 2009 | J2 League | 44 | 1 | 1 | 0 | — | | 45 | 1 |
| Tochigi SC | 2010 | J2 League | 21 | 0 | 0 | 0 | — | | 21 | 0 |
| Tochigi SC | 2011 | J2 League | 18 | 0 | 2 | 0 | — | | 20 | 0 |
| Tochigi SC | Total | | 90 | 2 | 5 | 0 | 0 | 0 | 95 | 2 |
| Gulbene | 2012 | Latvian Higher League | 15 | 1 | 2 | 0 | — | | 17 | 1 |
| Górnik Łęczna | 2012–13 | I liga | 14 | 1 | 1 | 0 | — | | 15 | 1 |
| Career total | | | 142 | 4 | 8 | 0 | 0 | 0 | 150 | 4 |
