= Yuki Okubo =

Japanese footballer

Yuki Okubo 大久保 裕樹
Personal information
- Full name: Yuki Okubo
- Date of birth: April 17, 1984 (age 42)
- Place of birth: Ichihara, Chiba, Japan
- Height: 1.78 m (5 ft 10 in)
- Position: Defender

Youth career
- 2000–2002: Funabashi High School

Senior career*
Years	Team	Apps	(Gls)
2003–2004	Sanfrecce Hiroshima	1	(0)
2005–2008	Kyoto Sanga FC	47	(1)
2009–2011	Tochigi SC	88	(6)
2012–2013	Tokushima Vortis	20	(0)
2014–2015	Matsumoto Yamaga FC	25	(5)
2016–2017	JEF United Chiba	19	(1)
Total		200	(13)
Medal record
Representing Japan
AFC U-19 Championship
Silver medal – second place	2002 Qatar
- * Club domestic league appearances and goals

Yuki Okubo (大久保 裕樹, Ōkubo Yūki; born April 17, 1984) is a Japanese former football player.

== Club career ==
Okubo made a total of 150 appearances in the J.League playing for Tokushima Vortis, Sanfrecce Hiroshima, Kyoto Sanga FC and Tochigi SC.

== National team career ==
In 2002, Okubo represented the Japan national under-19s in the 2002 AFC Youth Championship in Qatar.

== Career statistics ==
Appearances and goals by club, season and competition
Club	Season	League			Emperor's Cup		J.League Cup		Total	
Club	Season	Division	Apps	Goals	Apps	Goals	Apps	Goals	Apps	Goals
Sanfrecce Hiroshima	2003	J2 League	0	0	0	0	–		0	0
Sanfrecce Hiroshima	2004	J1 League	1	0	0	0	0	0	0	0
Kyoto Sanga FC	2005	J2 League	12	1	2	0	–		0	0
Kyoto Sanga FC	2006	J1 League	17	0	1	0	3	0	0	0
Kyoto Sanga FC	2007	J2 League	5	0	0	0	–		0	0
Kyoto Sanga FC	2008	J1 League	13	0	0	0	1	0	0	0
Tochigi SC	2009	J2 League	31	3	0	0	–		0	0
Tochigi SC	2010	J2 League	31	3	2	0	–		0	0
Tochigi SC	2011	J2 League	26	0	2	0	–		0	0
Tokushima Vortis	2012	J2 League	9	0	0	0	–		0	0
Tokushima Vortis	2013	J2 League	11	0	1	0	–		0	0
Matsumoto Yamaga FC	2014	J2 League	13	3	2	0	–		0	0
Matsumoto Yamaga FC	2015	J1 League	12	2	2	0	3	0	0	0
JEF United Chiba	2016	J2 League	6	0	3	0	–		9	0
JEF United Chiba	2017	J2 League	13	1	1	0	–		14	1
Career total			200	13	14	0	7	0	223	13
