= Hideyuki Akai =

Japanese football player

Personal information
- Full name: Hideyuki Akai
- Date of birth: May 2, 1985 (age 41)
- Place of birth: Chiba, Japan
- Height: 1.72 m (5 ft 7 1/2 in)
- Position: Defender

Team information
- Current team: SC Sagamihara
- Number: 38

Youth career
- 2001–2003: Ryutsu Keizai Univ. Kashiwa H.S.
- 2004–2007: Ryutsu Keizai University FC

Senior career*
Years	Team	Apps	(Gls)
2008–	Tochigi SC	178	(6)
2016–	→ SC Sagamihara (loan)		
- * Club domestic league appearances and goals as of 23 February 2016

Hideyuki Akai (赤井 秀行, Akai Hideyuki; born May 2, 1985 in Chiba) is a Japanese football player. He currently plays for SC Sagamihara.

== Career statistics ==
Updated to 23 February 2016.

Club performance			League		Cup		League Cup		Total	
Season	Club	League	Apps	Goals	Apps	Goals	Apps	Goals	Apps	Goals
Japan			League		Emperor's Cup		League Cup		Total	
2008	Tochigi SC	JFL	15	0	2	0	-		17	0
2009	Tochigi SC	J2 League	37	0	1	0	-		38	0
2010	Tochigi SC	J2 League	26	2	2	0	-		28	2
2011	Tochigi SC	J2 League	19	1	1	0	-		20	1
2012	Tochigi SC	J2 League	21	1	0	0	-		21	1
2013	Tochigi SC	J2 League	24	1	1	0	-		25	1
2014	Tochigi SC	J2 League	30	1	1	0	-		31	1
2015	Tochigi SC	J2 League	6	0	0	0	-		6	0
Career total			178	6	8	0	0	0	186	6
