= Yasumichi Uchima =

Japanese footballer

Personal information
- Date of birth: September 10, 1984 (age 42)
- Place of birth: Okinawa, Okinawa, Japan
- Height: 1.80 m (5 ft 11 in)
- Position: Defender

Youth career
- 2003–2006: Miyazaki Sangyo-keiei University

Senior career*
Years	Team	Apps	(Gls)
2007–2009	Sagan Tosu	46	(1)
2010–2012	Gainare Tottori	29	(1)
Total		75	(2)
- * Club domestic league appearances and goals

Yasumichi Uchima (内間 安路, Uchima Yasumichi; born September 10, 1984) is a former Japanese football player.

== Career statistics ==
Appearances and goals by club, season and competition
Club	Season	League			Emperor's Cup		Total	
Club	Season	Division	Apps	Goals	Apps	Goals	Apps	Goals
Sagan Tosu	2007	J2 League	10	0	0	0	10	0
Sagan Tosu	2008	J2 League	22	1	4	1	26	2
Sagan Tosu	2009	J2 League	14	0	1	0	15	0
Gainare Tottori	2010	Football League						
Career total			46	1	5	1	51	2
