= Yuki Matsumoto (footballer) =

Japanese footballer

Personal information
- Date of birth: January 22, 1989 (age 37)
- Place of birth: Shiki, Saitama, Japan
- Height: 1.80 m (5 ft 11 in)
- Position: Forward

Team information
- Current team: FC Maruyasu Okazaki
- Number: 19

Youth career
- 2007–2010: Kokushikan University

Senior career*
Years	Team	Apps	(Gls)
2011–2014	SC Sagamihara	89	(40)
2015	MIO Biwako Shiga	29	(6)
2016–	FC Maruyasu Okazaki		
- * Club domestic league appearances and goals as of 20 February 2016

Yuki Matsumoto (松本 祐樹, Matsumoto Yūki; born January 22, 1989) is a Japanese football player. He plays for FC Maruyasu Okazaki.

== Playing career ==
Yuki Matsumoto played for SC Sagamihara from 2011 to 2014. In 2015, moved to MIO Biwako Shiga. In 2016, he moved to FC Maruyasu Okazaki.

== Club statistics ==
Updated to 20 February 2016.

Club performance			League		Cup		Total	
Season	Club	League	Apps	Goals	Apps	Goals	Apps	Goals
Japan			League		Emperor's Cup		Total	
2011	SC Sagamihara	JRL (Kantō, Div. 2)	12	3	–		12	3
2012	SC Sagamihara	JRL (Kantō, Div. 1)	14	9	–		14	9
2013	SC Sagamihara	JFL	31	13	–		31	13
2014	SC Sagamihara	J3 League	32	5	–		32	5
2015	MIO Biwako Shiga	JFL	29	6	2	1	31	7
Total			118	46	2	1	120	47
