= Koji Hirose =

Japanese footballer

Personal information
- Full name: Koji Hirose
- Date of birth: 13 March 1984 (age 42)
- Place of birth: Jōyō, Kyoto, Japan
- Height: 1.65 m (5 ft 5 in)
- Position: Striker

Youth career
- 2002–2005: Hannan University

Senior career*
Years	Team	Apps	(Gls)
2006–2009	Sagan Tosu	123	(15)
2010–2019	Tochigi SC	269	(39)
- * Club domestic league appearances and goals

Koji Hirose (廣瀬 浩二, Hirose Koji; born 13 March 1984) is a Japanese retired footballer.

== Club career statistics ==
Updated to 23 February 2017.

Club performance			League		Cup		Total	
Season	Club	League	Apps	Goals	Apps	Goals	Apps	Goals
Japan			League		Emperor's Cup		Total	
2006	Sagan Tosu	J2 League	35	4	2	0	37	4
2007	Sagan Tosu	J2 League	33	3	3	0	36	3
2008	Sagan Tosu	J2 League	24	5	4	7	28	12
2009	Sagan Tosu	J2 League	31	3	1	0	32	3
2010	Tochigi SC	J2 League	33	3	1	0	34	3
2011	Tochigi SC	J2 League	32	1	1	0	33	1
2012	Tochigi SC	J2 League	41	11	1	0	42	11
2013	Tochigi SC	J2 League	42	7	1	0	43	7
2014	Tochigi SC	J2 League	40	7	1	0	41	7
2015	Tochigi SC	J2 League	36	3	1	0	37	3
2016	Tochigi SC	J3 League	30	5	–		30	5
Total			377	52	16	7	393	57
