= Masaki Saito (footballer) =

Japanese footballer

Personal information
- Date of birth: June 23, 1980 (age 46)
- Place of birth: Saitama, Japan
- Height: 1.75 m (5 ft 9 in)
- Position: Forward

Senior career*
Years	Team	Apps	(Gls)
2001	Monte Azul		
2002	Shizuoka FC		
2004–2005	Shizuoka FC		
2006–2007	Tokyo Verdy	34	(7)
2008	Okinawa Kariyushi FC	10	(8)
2009–2011	SC Sagamihara		
2012–2013	Zweigen Kanazawa	37	(7)
- * Club domestic league appearances and goals

Masaki Saito (齋藤 将基, Saitō Masaki; born June 23, 1980) is a former Japanese football player.

== Club statistics ==
Club performance			League		Cup		Continental		Total	
Season	Club	League	Apps	Goals	Apps	Goals	Apps	Goals	Apps	Goals
Japan			League		Emperor's Cup		Asia		Total	
2002	Shizuoka FC	Regional Leagues					-			
2004	Shizuoka FC	Regional Leagues			1	0	-		1	0
2005	Shizuoka FC	Regional Leagues			-		-			
2006	Tokyo Verdy	J2 League	29	7	0	0	2	0	31	7
2007	Tokyo Verdy	J2 League	5	0	1	0	-		6	0
2008	Okinawa Kariyushi FC	Regional Leagues	10	8	3	3	-		13	11
2009	SC Sagamihara	Prefectural Leagues								
2009	SC Sagamihara	Prefectural Leagues								
Total	Japan		44	15	5	3	2	0	51	18
Career total			44	15	5	3	2	0	51	18
