= 2011 Tochigi SC season =

Tochigi SC
2011 season
- Manager: Hiroshi Matsuda
- Stadium: Tochigi Green Stadium
- J2 League: 10th of 20
Home colours	Away colours

2011 Tochigi SC season.

== League table ==
Pos	Team	Pld	W	D	L	GF	GA	GD	Pts
8	Giravanz Kitakyushu	38	16	10	12	45	46	−1	58
9	Thespa Kusatsu	38	16	9	13	51	51	0	57
10	Tochigi SC	38	15	11	12	44	39	+5	56
11	Roasso Kumamoto	38	13	12	13	33	44	−11	51
12	Oita Trinita	38	12	14	12	42	45	−3	50

Updated to match(es) played on December 3, 2011. Source: J.League Division 2
Rules for classification: 1st points; 2nd goal differential; 3rd goals scored; 4th head-to-head results; 5th disciplinary points; 6th draw. If two clubs are tied for first place, both clubs will be declared champions.

== J2 League ==
Match	Date	Team	Score	Team	Venue	Attendance
1	2011.03.06	Tochigi SC	2-1	Thespa Kusatsu	Tochigi Green Stadium	6,144
8	2011.04.23	Kataller Toyama	1-3	Tochigi SC	Kataller Toyama	2,849
9	2011.04.30	Tochigi SC	1-0	Kyoto Sanga FC	Tochigi Green Stadium	4,473
10	2011.05.04	Fagiano Okayama	2-2	Tochigi SC	Kanko Stadium	7,323
11	2011.05.08	Tochigi SC	2-1	Yokohama FC	Tochigi Green Stadium	6,105
12	2011.05.15	Oita Trinita	1-0	Tochigi SC	Oita Bank Dome	7,133
13	2011.05.22	Tochigi SC	1-2	Ehime FC	Tochigi Green Stadium	3,140
14	2011.05.28	Tokushima Vortis	0-4	Tochigi SC	Pocarisweat Stadium	2,165
15	2011.06.04	Tochigi SC	0-0	Mito HollyHock	Tochigi Green Stadium	3,931
16	2011.06.12	Shonan Bellmare	0-2	Tochigi SC	Hiratsuka Stadium	6,629
17	2011.06.19	Tochigi SC	2-1	Giravanz Kitakyushu	Tochigi Green Stadium	6,800
18	2011.06.26	JEF United Chiba	2-2	Tochigi SC	Fukuda Denshi Arena	9,611
2	2011.06.29	Sagan Tosu	1-2	Tochigi SC	Best Amenity Stadium	3,917
19	2011.07.02	Tochigi SC	1-1	Consadole Sapporo	Tochigi Green Stadium	4,736
20	2011.07.10	Kyoto Sanga FC	1-1	Tochigi SC	Kyoto Nishikyogoku Athletic Stadium	4,402
21	2011.07.16	Tochigi SC	0-0	Sagan Tosu	Tochigi Green Stadium	4,584
22	2011.07.23	FC Gifu	0-1	Tochigi SC	Gifu Nagaragawa Stadium	3,218
23	2011.07.30	Tochigi SC	0-0	Fagiano Okayama	Tochigi Green Stadium	6,622
3	2011.08.06	Tochigi SC	1-0	Gainare Tottori	Tochigi Green Stadium	3,054
24	2011.08.13	Yokohama FC	2-0	Tochigi SC	NHK Spring Mitsuzawa Football Stadium	5,012
25	2011.08.21	Tochigi SC	2-1	FC Tokyo	Tochigi Green Stadium	9,953
26	2011.08.28	Ehime FC	2-2	Tochigi SC	Ningineer Stadium	2,737
4	2011.09.04	FC Tokyo	0-0	Tochigi SC	Kumagaya Athletic Stadium	6,795
27	2011.09.11	Consadole Sapporo	1-0	Tochigi SC	Sapporo Atsubetsu Stadium	10,110
28	2011.09.18	Tochigi SC	1-2	Kataller Toyama	Tochigi Green Stadium	5,425
29	2011.09.25	Tochigi SC	0-1	Roasso Kumamoto	Tochigi Green Stadium	4,411
5	2011.09.28	Tochigi SC	0-1	FC Gifu	Tochigi Green Stadium	2,493
30	2011.10.01	Tokyo Verdy	0-0	Tochigi SC	Ajinomoto Stadium	4,311
31	2011.10.15	Tochigi SC	0-3	Shonan Bellmare	Tochigi Green Stadium	3,122
6	2011.10.19	Roasso Kumamoto	0-1	Tochigi SC	Roasso Kumamoto	3,189
32	2011.10.23	Tochigi SC	0-0	JEF United Chiba	Tochigi Green Stadium	5,998
7	2011.10.26	Tochigi SC	2-4	Tokyo Verdy	Tochigi Green Stadium	3,839
33	2011.10.29	Giravanz Kitakyushu	2-1	Tochigi SC	Honjo Stadium	2,303
34	2011.11.06	Gainare Tottori	0-5	Tochigi SC	Tottori Bank Bird Stadium	2,111
35	2011.11.12	Tochigi SC	0-1	Tokushima Vortis	Tochigi Green Stadium	4,404
36	2011.11.20	Mito HollyHock	0-1	Tochigi SC	K's denki Stadium Mito	4,759
37	2011.11.26	Tochigi SC	2-1	Oita Trinita	Tochigi Green Stadium	4,614
38	2011.12.03	Thespa Kusatsu	4-0	Tochigi SC	Shoda Shoyu Stadium Gunma	3,246
