= Yuki Okada (footballer, born 1983) =

Japanese footballer

Yuki Okada 岡田 佑樹
Personal information
- Full name: Yuki Okada
- Date of birth: October 4, 1983 (age 43)
- Place of birth: Fujieda, Shizuoka, Japan
- Height: 1.72 m (5 ft 7 1/2 in)
- Position: Defender

Youth career
- 1999–2001: Fujieda Higashi High School

Senior career*
Years	Team	Apps	(Gls)
2002	Chuo Bohan		
2003–2007	Consadole Sapporo	80	(3)
2008–2010	Tochigi SC	87	(4)
2011–2012	Mito HollyHock	36	(0)
2013	Fujieda MYFC	7	(0)
Total		210+	(7+)
- * Club domestic league appearances and goals

Yuki Okada (岡田 佑樹, Okada Yūki; born October 4, 1983) is a former Japanese football player.

== Career statistics ==
Appearances and goals by club, season and competition
Club	Season	League			Emperor's Cup		Total	
Club	Season	Division	Apps	Goals	Apps	Goals	Apps	Goals
Consadole Sapporo	2003	J2 League	16	1	2	0	18	1
Consadole Sapporo	2004	J2 League	26	0	3	0	29	0
Consadole Sapporo	2005	J2 League	38	2	1	0	39	2
Consadole Sapporo	2006	J2 League	0	0	0	0	0	0
Consadole Sapporo	2007	J2 League	0	0	1	0	1	0
Tochigi SC	2008	Football League	30	0	2	1	32	1
Tochigi SC	2009	J2 League	38	4	1	0	39	4
Tochigi SC	2010	J2 League	19	0	0	0	19	0
Mito HollyHock	2011	J2 League	25	0	2	0	27	0
Mito HollyHock	2012	J2 League	11	0	0	0	11	0
Fujieda MYFC	2013	Football League	7	0	0	0	7	0
Career total			210	7	11	1	211	8
