= Fukuyama University =

University in Hiroshima, Japan

Coordinates: 34°27′30″N 133°13′46″E

- 福山大学
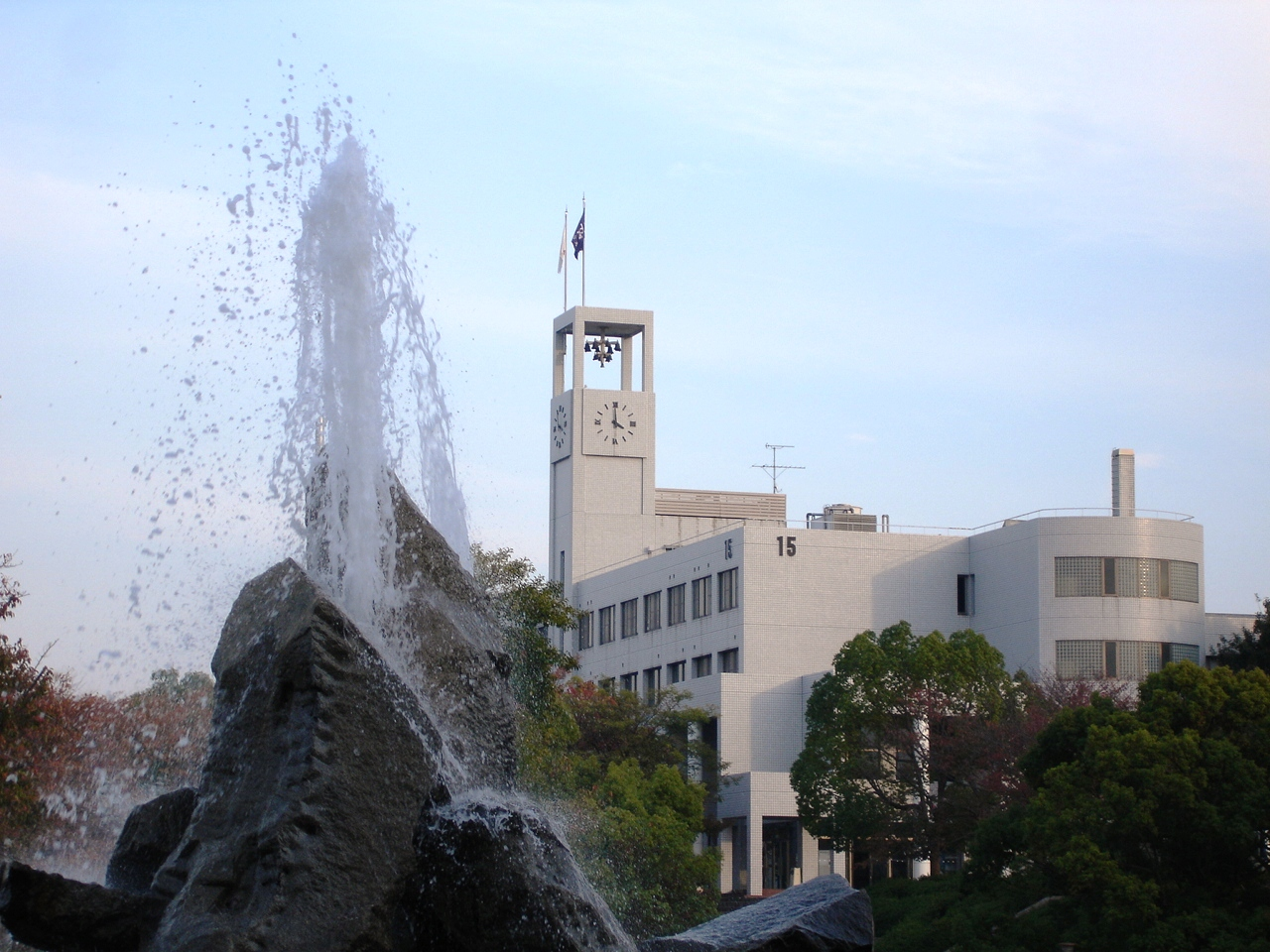
- Fukuyama University
- Type: Private
- Established: 1975
- Location: Fukuyama, Hiroshima, Japan
- Website: www.fukuyama-u.ac.jp

Fukuyama University (福山大学, Fukuyama daigaku) is a private university in Fukuyama, Hiroshima, Japan, established in 1975; in 2024, the university had over 3300 students and offered undergraduate and postgraduate courses in Economics, Sociology, Engineering and /Life Sciences/ Biotechnology.

A new campus was completed in 2020.

In 2025, the University was rated as the 238th best in Japan.
