= Kunihiro Shibazaki =

Japanese footballer

Personal information
- Full name: Kunihiro Shibazaki
- Date of birth: April 1, 1985 (age 41)
- Place of birth: Tokyo, Japan
- Height: 1.92 m (6 ft 3 1/2 in)
- Position: Goalkeeper

Youth career
- 2003–2006: Shizuoka Sangyo University

Senior career*
Years	Team	Apps	(Gls)
2007	Omiya Ardija	0	(0)
2008–2014	Tochigi SC	55	(0)
Total		55	(0)
- * Club domestic league appearances and goals

Kunihiro Shibazaki (柴崎 邦博, Shibazaki Kunihiro; born April 1, 1985) is a former Japanese football player.

== Club statistics ==
Club performance			League		Cup		League Cup		Total	
Season	Club	League	Apps	Goals	Apps	Goals	Apps	Goals	Apps	Goals
Japan			League		Emperor's Cup		J.League Cup		Total	
2007	Omiya Ardija	J1 League	0	0	0	0	0	0	0	0
2008	Tochigi SC	Football League	0	0	0	0	-		0	0
2009	Tochigi SC	J2 League	17	0	1	0	-		18	0
2010	Tochigi SC	J2 League	19	0	1	0	-		20	0
2011	Tochigi SC	J2 League					-			
Country	Japan		36	0	2	0	0	0	38	0
Total			36	0	2	0	0	0	38	0
