= Tochigi Green Stadium =

Stadium in Utsunomiya, Japan

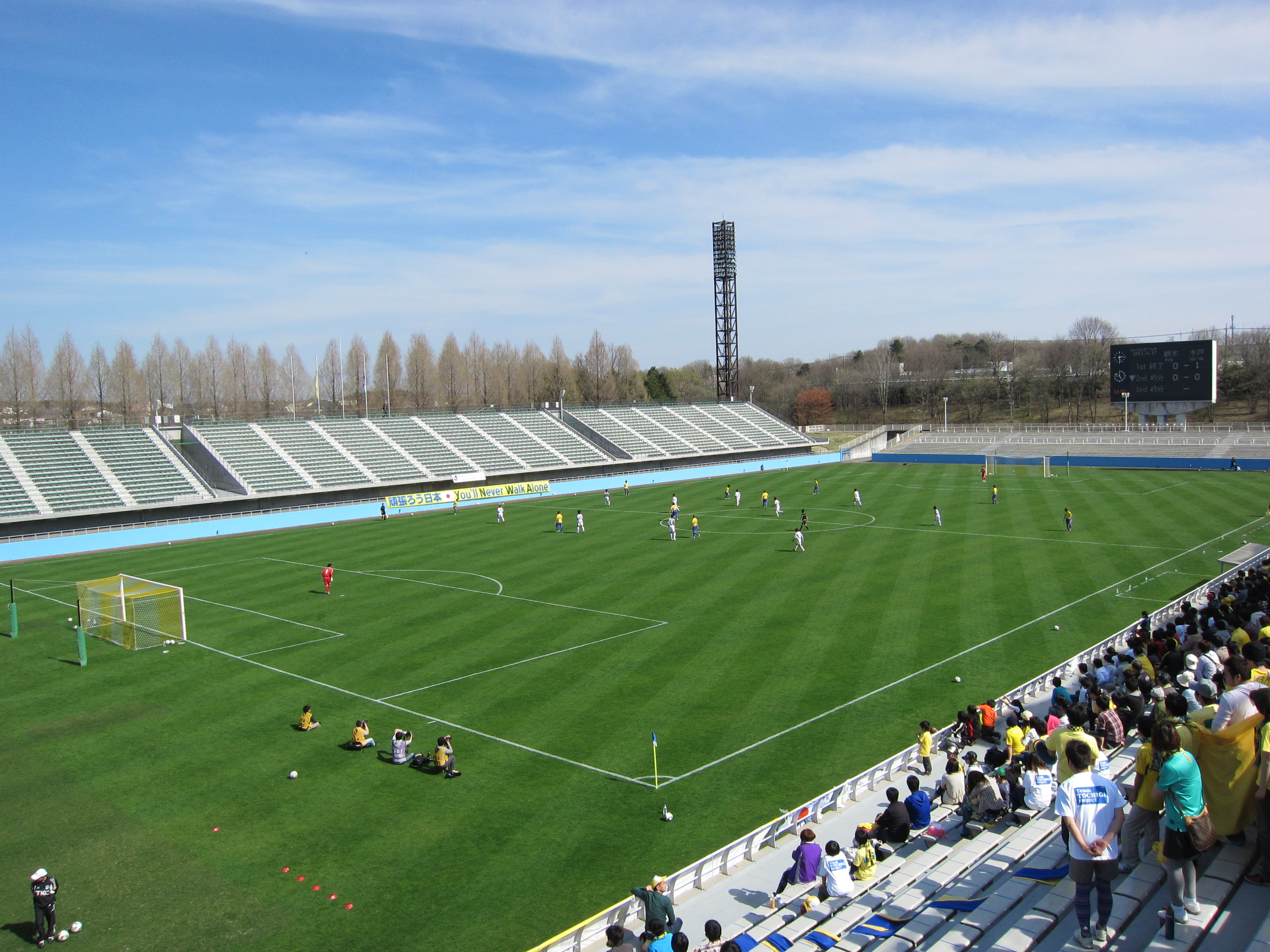

- Japan Tochigi Prefecture
- Interactive map of Tochigi Green Stadium
- Location: Utsunomiya, Japan
- Coordinates: 36.556667°N 139.986667°E
- Owner: Tochigi Prefecture
- Operator: Kita Kanto Sohgo Security Service
- Capacity: 18,025
- Surface: Grass

Construction
- Opened: 1993

Tenant
- Tochigi SC (1993–2019)

Tochigi Green Stadium (栃木県グリーンスタジアム, Tochigi-ken Gurīn Stajiamu) is a multi-use stadium in Utsunomiya, Tochigi, Japan.

Originally it was a stadium with a single concrete stand and grass terraces on the other sides. A new concrete stand was built opposite the main stand and opened for the 2011 season. The stadium's capacity is 18,025 people.

It is also used sometimes for Top League rugby games.
