= 2005 Yokohama F. Marinos season =

Yokohama F. Marinos
2005 season
- Manager: Takeshi Okada
- Stadium: Nissan Stadium
- J.League 1: 9th
- Emperor's Cup: 5th Round
- J.League Cup: Semifinals
- AFC Champions League: GL-F 2nd
- Top goalscorer: Hideo Ōshima (9)
- Average home league attendance: 25,713
Home colours	Away colours

During the 2005 season, Yokohama F. Marinos competed in the J.League 1, in which they finished 9th.

== Competitions ==
Competitions	Position
J.League 1	9th / 18 clubs
Emperor's Cup	5th Round
J.League Cup	Semifinals

== Domestic results ==
=== J.League 1 ===
Pos	Team	Pld	W	D	L	GF	GA	GD	Pts
7	Sanfrecce Hiroshima	34	13	11	10	50	42	+8	50
8	Kawasaki Frontale	34	15	5	14	54	47	+7	50
9	Yokohama F. Marinos	34	12	12	10	41	40	+1	48
10	FC Tokyo	34	11	14	9	43	40	+3	47
11	Oita Trinita	34	12	7	15	44	43	+1	43

Updated to match(es) played on December 3, 2005. Source: J. League Division 1
Rules for classification: 1) points; 2) goal difference; 3) number of goals scored.

Match	Date	Venue	Opponents	Score
1	2005..			-
2	2005..			-
3	2005..			-
4	2005..			-
5	2005..			-
6	2005..			-
7	2005..			-
8	2005..			-
9	2005..			-
10	2005..			-
11	2005..			-
12	2005..			-
13	2005..			-
14	2005..			-
15	2005..			-
16	2005..			-
17	2005..			-
18	2005..			-
19	2005..			-
20	2005..			-
21	2005..			-
22	2005..			-
23	2005..			-
24	2005..			-
25	2005..			-
26	2005..			-
27	2005..			-
28	2005..			-
29	2005..			-
30	2005..			-
31	2005..			-
32	2005..			-
33	2005..			-
34	2005..			-

=== Emperor's Cup ===
Yokohama F. Marinos received a bye to the fourth round as being part of the J.League Division 1.

3 November 2005 Fourth Round	Yokohama F. Marinos	4–0	Vegalta Sendai	Yokohama
	Kubo 17', 46'; Oku 55'; Gral 71' (pen.)	Report		Stadium: International Stadium; Attendance: 6,625

10 December 2005 Fifth Round	Yokohama F. Marinos	2–3 (a.e.t.)	Kawasaki Frontale	Yokohama
	Kubo 69', 90'	Report	Hulk 25', 74'; Nakamura 94'	Stadium: International Stadium; Attendance: 8,155

=== J.League Cup ===
Yokohama F. Marinos received a bye to the quarter-finals in order to avoid scheduling conflicts due to their participation in the AFC Champions League.

Quarter-finals

6 August 2005 First leg	Omiya Ardija	0–1	Yokohama F. Marinos	Kumagaya
19:05	Morita (yellow card) 89'	Report	Matsuda (yellow card) 44'; Kurihara (yellow card) 57' (goal) 85'	Stadium: Kumagaya Athletic Stadium; Attendance: 5,796; Referee: Joji Kashihara

14 August 2005 Second leg	Yokohama F. Marinos	3–1 (4–1 agg.)	Omiya Ardija	Yokohama
19:00	Sakata 15'; Matsuda 60'; Shimizu 85'	Report	Okuno (red card) 5'; Nishimura 29'	Stadium: Mitsuzawa Football Stadium; Attendance: 10,165; Referee: Kiyoshi Ota

Semi-finals

31 August 2005 First leg	Gamba Osaka	1–0	Yokohama F. Marinos	Osaka
19:05	Araújo 82'	Report	Shimizu (yellow card) 79'	Stadium: Expo '70 Commemorative Stadium; Attendance: 7,049; Referee: Hiroyoshi Takayama

5 October 2005 Second leg	Yokohama F. Marinos	1–0 (a.e.t.) (1–1 agg.) (1–4 p)	Gamba Osaka	Yokohama
19:00	Nasu 30' (yellow card) 119'; Matsuda (yellow card) 56'; Gral (yellow card) 87' (yellow-red card) 108'	Report	Watanabe (yellow card) 12'; Futagawa (yellow card) 29'; Araújo (yellow card) 78'; Endō (yellow card) 102'	Stadium: International Stadium; Attendance: 11,370; Referee: Toshimitsu Yoshida
	Penalties
	Yamase (penalty missed); Ohashi (penalty missed); Dutra (penalty scored)		(penalty scored) Endō; (penalty scored) Araújo; (penalty scored) Matsunami; (penalty scored) Oguro

=== Japanese Super Cup ===
Yokohama F. Marinos qualified for this tournament as winners of the 2004 season.

26 February 2005 Final	Yokohama F. Marinos	2–2 (4–5 p)	Tokyo Verdy 1969	Yokohama
13:33	Kurihara (yellow card) 52'; Ohashi 72'; Tanaka 87'	Report	Hirano (yellow card) 19'; Lee Woo-jin (yellow card) 50'; Washington 68', 89'	Stadium: International Stadium; Attendance: 21,104; Referee: Toru Kamikawa
	Penalties
	Kurihara (penalty scored); Ohashi (penalty scored); Ueno (penalty missed); Dutra (penalty scored); Tanaka (penalty scored)		(penalty scored) Hayashi; (penalty scored) Washington; (penalty scored) Kobayashi; (penalty scored) Hiramoto; (penalty scored) Lee Woo-jin

== International results ==
=== A3 Champions Cup ===
Yokohama F. Marinos qualified for this tournament as winners of the 2004 season.

Team	Pld	W	D	L	GF	GA	GD	Pts
(South Korea) Suwon Samsung Bluewings (C)	3	2	1	0	8	4	+4	7
(South Korea) Pohang Steelers	3	1	2	0	5	3	+2	5
(Japan) Yokohama F. Marinos	3	1	1	1	4	4	0	4
(China) Shenzhen Jianlibao	3	0	0	3	1	7	−6	0

(C) Champions

13 February 2005 1	Pohang Steelers (South Korea)	1–1	(Japan) Yokohama F. Marinos	Seogwipo
13:30 KST	Pinheiro 64'	Report	Shimizu 3'	Stadium: Jeju World Cup Stadium

16 February 2005 2	Yokohama F. Marinos (Japan)	2–0	(China) Shenzhen Jianlibao	Seogwipo
16:30 KST	Ueno 46'; Kumabayashi 63'	Report		Stadium: Jeju World Cup Stadium

19 February 2005 3	Suwon Samsung Bluewings (South Korea)	3–1	(Japan) Yokohama F. Marinos	Seogwipo
13:30 KST	Nádson 16', 85'; Kim Dong-hyun 51'	Report	Oshima 20'	Stadium: Jeju World Cup Stadium

=== AFC Champions League ===
Yokohama F. Marinos qualified for this tournament as winners of the 2004 season.

Team	Pld	W	D	L	GF	GA	GD	Pts
(China) Shandong Luneng Taishan	6	6	0	0	15	2	+13	18
(Japan) Yokohama F. Marinos	6	4	0	2	10	4	+6	12
(Indonesia) PSM Makassar	6	1	1	4	4	14	−10	4
(Thailand) BEC Tero	6	0	1	5	3	12	−9	1

9 March 2005 1	Yokohama F. Marinos (Japan)	0–1	(China) Shandong Luneng Taishan	Yokohama
		Report	Gao Yao 68'	Stadium: International Stadium

16 March 2005 2	PSM Makassar (Indonesia)	0–2	(Japan) Yokohama F. Marinos	Makassar
		Report	Ōshima 30'; Yamazaki 63'	Stadium: Andi Mattalatta Stadium

6 April 2005 3	BEC Tero Sasana (Thailand)	1–2	(Japan) Yokohama F. Marinos	Bangkok
	Kongpraphan 67'	Report	Ahn Jung-hwan 26', 40'	Stadium: Nong Chok Sport Stadium

20 April 2005 4	Yokohama F. Marinos (Japan)	2–0	(Thailand) BEC Tero Sasana	Yokohama
	Sakata 45'; Ahn Jung-hwan 57'	Report		Stadium: International Stadium

11 May 2005 5	Shandong Luneng Taishan (China)	2–1	(Japan) Yokohama F. Marinos	Jinan
	Zheng Zhi 39', 90+4'	Report	Nasu 7'	Stadium: Provincial Stadium

25 May 2005 6	Yokohama F. Marinos (Japan)	3–0	(Indonesia) PSM Makassar	Yokohama
	Dutra 75'; Ueno 79'; Oku 82'	Report		Stadium: International Stadium

=== Friendlies ===
1 June 2005 1	Yokohama F. Marinos (Japan)	0–1	(Italy) Juventus	Yokohama
		Report	Del Piero 42'	Stadium: International Stadium; Attendance: 30,230; Referee: Masaaki Iemoto

8 June 2005 2	Los Angeles Galaxy (United States)	0–2	(Japan) Yokohama F. Marinos	Carson, California
		Report	Nasu 49'; Ōshima 75'	Stadium: Home Depot Center; Attendance: 8,536

12 June 2005 3	Yokohama F. Marinos (Japan)	3–3	(Spain) Barcelona	Yokohama
	Sakata 1'; Ōshima 26'; Oku 80' (pen.); H. Tanaka (yellow card)	Report	Giuly 14'; Motta 44', 58'	Stadium: International Stadium; Attendance: 65,000; Referee: Masayoshi Okada

30 July 2005 4	Yokohama F. Marinos (Japan)	1–1	(Spain) Barcelona	Yokohama
	Dutra (yellow card) 20'; Kurihara 78'	Report	Xavi 43'	Stadium: International Stadium; Attendance: 35,000; Referee: Kirodizi Yamadizi

== Player statistics ==
No.	Pos.	Player	D.o.B. (Age)	Height / Weight	J.League 1		Emperor's Cup		J.League Cup		Total	
No.	Pos.	Player	D.o.B. (Age)	Height / Weight	Apps	Goals	Apps	Goals	Apps	Goals	Apps	Goals
1	GK	Tatsuya Enomoto	March 16, 1979 (aged 25)	cm / kg	11	0						
2	DF	Eisuke Nakanishi	June 23, 1973 (aged 31)	cm / kg	13	0						
3	DF	Naoki Matsuda	March 14, 1977 (aged 27)	cm / kg	27	1						
4	MF	Daisuke Nasu	October 10, 1981 (aged 23)	cm / kg	29	2						
5	DF	Dutra	August 11, 1973 (aged 31)	cm / kg	32	1						
6	MF	Yoshiharu Ueno	April 21, 1973 (aged 31)	cm / kg	26	2						
7	DF	Hayuma Tanaka	July 31, 1982 (aged 22)	cm / kg	31	1						
8	MF	Akihiro Endō	September 18, 1975 (aged 29)	cm / kg	2	0						
9	FW	Tatsuhiko Kubo	June 18, 1976 (aged 28)	cm / kg	10	1						
10	MF	Koji Yamase	September 22, 1981 (aged 23)	cm / kg	19	1						
11	FW	Daisuke Sakata	January 16, 1983 (aged 22)	cm / kg	29	5						
13	MF	Shingo Kumabayashi	June 23, 1981 (aged 23)	cm / kg	8	0						
14	MF	Daisuke Oku	February 7, 1976 (aged 29)	cm / kg	25	1						
15	FW	Hideo Ōshima	March 7, 1980 (aged 24)	cm / kg	28	9						
16	GK	Hiroki Iikura	June 1, 1986 (aged 18)	cm / kg	0	0						
17	FW	Adhemar	April 27, 1972 (aged 32)	cm / kg	0	0						
17	MF	Magrão	December 20, 1978 (aged 26)	cm / kg	13	1						
18	FW	Norihisa Shimizu	October 4, 1976 (aged 28)	cm / kg	12	0						
19	FW	Ahn Jung-Hwan	January 27, 1976 (aged 29)	cm / kg	9	4						
19	FW	Rodrigo Gral	February 21, 1977 (aged 28)	cm / kg	14	5						
21	GK	Tetsuya Enomoto	May 2, 1983 (aged 21)	cm / kg	23	0						
22	DF	Yuji Nakazawa	February 25, 1978 (aged 27)	cm / kg	27	3						
23	MF	Masahiro Ōhashi	June 23, 1981 (aged 23)	cm / kg	25	1						
24	MF	Taketo Shiokawa	December 17, 1977 (aged 27)	cm / kg	3	1						
25	MF	Yuji Goto	August 20, 1985 (aged 19)	cm / kg	1	0						
26	DF	Yūsuke Tanaka	April 14, 1986 (aged 18)	cm / kg	0	0						
27	FW	Masato Yamazaki	December 4, 1981 (aged 23)	cm / kg	2	0						
28	MF	Nobuki Hara	September 6, 1979 (aged 25)	cm / kg	3	0						
29	MF	Kenta Kano	May 2, 1986 (aged 18)	cm / kg	1	0						
30	DF	Yuzo Kurihara	September 18, 1983 (aged 21)	cm / kg	13	1						
31	GK	Kenichi Shimokawa	May 14, 1970 (aged 34)	cm / kg	0	0						
32	MF	Yukihiro Yamase	April 22, 1984 (aged 20)	cm / kg	1	0						
33	FW	Sho Kitano	November 20, 1984 (aged 20)	cm / kg	1	0						
34	DF	Kei Omoto	July 21, 1984 (aged 20)	cm / kg	0	0						
35	MF	Ryuji Kawai	July 14, 1978 (aged 26)	cm / kg	22	1						
36	DF	Takashi Amano	April 13, 1986 (aged 18)	cm / kg	0	0						

== Other pages ==
- (in Japanese) J.League official site
