= 2003 Emperor's Cup final =

2003 Emperor's Cup Final
Júbilo Iwata	Cerezo Osaka
1	0
- Date: January 1, 2004
- Venue: National Stadium, Tokyo

2003 Emperor's Cup Final was the 83rd final of the Emperor's Cup competition. The final was played at National Stadium in Tokyo on January 1, 2004. Júbilo Iwata won the championship.

== Overview ==
Júbilo Iwata won their 2nd title, by defeating Cerezo Osaka 1–0 with Gral goal.

== Match details ==
January 1, 2004

Júbilo Iwata	1–0	Cerezo Osaka
Gral 71'

National Stadium

Júbilo Iwata
GK	28	(Japan) Yohei Sato
DF	2	(Japan) Hideto Suzuki
DF	5	(Japan) Makoto Tanaka
DF	14	(Japan) Takahiro Yamanishi
MF	11	(Japan) Norihiro Nishi
MF	4	(Japan) Takahiro Kawamura
MF	6	(Japan) Toshihiro Hattori
MF	19	(Japan) Sho Naruoka	(substituted off) 67'
MF	7	(Japan) Hiroshi Nanami
FW	18	(Japan) Ryoichi Maeda	(substituted off) 83'
FW	8	(Brazil) Gral
Substitutes:
GK	12	(Japan) Hiromasa Yamamoto
DF	3	(Japan) Taikai Uemoto
MF	27	(Japan) Naoya Kikuchi	(substituted on) 83'
FW	9	(Japan) Masashi Nakayama	(substituted on) 67'
FW	26	(Japan) Yasumasa Nishino
Manager:
(Japan) Masaaki Yanagishita

Cerezo Osaka
GK	1	(Japan) Seigo Shimokawa
DF	2	(Japan) Yasushi Kita
DF	7	(Japan) Satoru Suzuki
DF	33	(Japan) Hiroshige Yanagimoto
DF	4	(Japan) Takanori Nunobe
MF	17	(Japan) Kiyokazu Kudo
MF	29	(Japan) Noriyuki Sakemoto	(substituted off) 46'
MF	16	(Japan) Nobuki Hara	(substituted off) 55'
MF	8	(Japan) Hiroaki Morishima
FW	18	(Brazil) Baron
FW	10	(Japan) Yoshito Ōkubo
Substitutes:
GK	21	(Japan) Daisuke Tada
MF	6	(Japan) Takeshi Hamada
MF	27	(Japan) Takaaki Tokushige	(substituted on) 46'
MF	31	(Japan) Tadayo Fukuo
FW	20	(Japan) Akinori Nishizawa	(substituted on) 55'
Manager:
(Japan) Yuji Tsukada

== See also ==
- 2003 Emperor's Cup
