= 2004 Yokohama F. Marinos season =

Yokohama F. Marinos
2004 season
- Manager: Takeshi Okada
- Stadium: International Stadium Yokohama
- J.League 1: Champions
- Emperor's Cup: 5th Round
- J.League Cup: Quarterfinals
- Top goalscorer: Ahn Jung-Hwan (12)
- Average home league attendance: 24,818
Home colours	Away colours

During the 2004 season, Yokohama F. Marinos competed in the J.League 1, the top tier of Japanese football, and finished as champions of the J.League 1.

== Competitions ==
Competitions	Position
J.League 1	Champions / 16 clubs
Emperor's Cup	5th Round
J.League Cup	Quarterfinals

== Domestic results ==
=== J.League 1 ===
Match	Date	Venue	Opponents	Score
1-1	2004.3.13	International Stadium Yokohama	Urawa Red Diamonds	1-1
1-2	2004.3.20	Ichihara Seaside Stadium	JEF United Ichihara	3-0
1-3	2004.4.3	International Stadium Yokohama	Cerezo Osaka	2-1
1-4	2004.4.10	Niigata Stadium	Albirex Niigata	1-3
1-5	2004.4.14	Oita Stadium	Oita Trinita	1-1
1-6	2004.4.17	International Stadium Yokohama	Gamba Osaka	2-1
1-7	2004.5.2	Ajinomoto Stadium	FC Tokyo	0-2
1-9	2004.5.9	International Stadium Yokohama	Tokyo Verdy 1969	3-1
1-8	2004.5.12	International Stadium Yokohama	Shimizu S-Pulse	1-1
1-10	2004.5.15	Shizuoka Stadium	Júbilo Iwata	1-2
1-11	2004.5.23	International Stadium Yokohama	Nagoya Grampus Eight	2-1
1-12	2004.6.12	Kobe Wing Stadium	Vissel Kobe	0-2
1-13	2004.6.16	International Stadium Yokohama	Sanfrecce Hiroshima	2-0
1-14	2004.6.19	Kashiwanoha Stadium	Kashiwa Reysol	1-2
1-15	2004.6.26	International Stadium Yokohama	Kashima Antlers	1-0
2-1	2004.8.15	Shizuoka Stadium	Shimizu S-Pulse	1-2
2-2	2004.8.21	International Stadium Yokohama	Oita Trinita	2-1
2-3	2004.8.29	Mizuho Athletic Stadium	Nagoya Grampus Eight	2-1
2-4	2004.9.11	National Stadium	Júbilo Iwata	3-0
2-5	2004.9.18	Hiroshima Big Arch	Sanfrecce Hiroshima	2-2
2-6	2004.9.23	National Stadium	Vissel Kobe	2-2
2-7	2004.9.26	Nagai Stadium	Cerezo Osaka	1-1
2-8	2004.10.3	International Stadium Yokohama	Kashiwa Reysol	0-1
2-9	2004.10.17	Saitama Stadium 2002	Urawa Red Diamonds	0-1
2-10	2004.10.23	International Stadium Yokohama	FC Tokyo	2-1
2-11	2004.10.30	Kashima Soccer Stadium	Kashima Antlers	3-1
2-12	2004.11.6	International Stadium Yokohama	JEF United Ichihara	2-1
2-13	2004.11.20	Osaka Expo '70 Stadium	Gamba Osaka	0-2
2-14	2004.11.23	International Stadium Yokohama	Albirex Niigata	1-2
2-15	2004.11.28	Ajinomoto Stadium	Tokyo Verdy 1969	0-0

=== Emperor's Cup ===
Match	Date	Venue	Opponents	Score
4th Round	2004.11.13	Yamagata Park Stadium	Montedio Yamagata	1-2
5th Round	2004.12.17	Sendai Stadium	Thespa Kusatsu	3-2 a.e.t. (sudden death)

=== J.League Cup ===
Match	Date	Venue	Opponents	Score
GL-A-1	2004.3.27	Hiroshima Stadium	Sanfrecce Hiroshima	0-0
GL-A-2	2004.4.29	International Stadium Yokohama	Sanfrecce Hiroshima	2-1
GL-A-3	2004.5.29	Nagai Stadium	Cerezo Osaka	0-1
GL-A-4	2004.6.5	Yokohama Mitsuzawa Football Stadium	Tokyo Verdy 1969	1-2
GL-A-5	2004.7.17	Ajinomoto Stadium	Tokyo Verdy 1969	3-0
GL-A-6	2004.7.24	Yokohama Mitsuzawa Football Stadium	Cerezo Osaka	1-0
Quarterfinals	2004.9.4	Saitama Stadium 2002	Urawa Red Diamonds	3-2

== Player statistics ==
No.	Pos.	Player	D.o.B. (Age)	Height / Weight	J.League 1		Emperor's Cup		J.League Cup		Total	
No.	Pos.	Player	D.o.B. (Age)	Height / Weight	Apps	Goals	Apps	Goals	Apps	Goals	Apps	Goals
1	GK	Tatsuya Enomoto	March 16, 1979 (aged 24)	cm / kg	30	0						
2	DF	Eisuke Nakanishi	June 23, 1973 (aged 30)	cm / kg	20	0						
3	DF	Naoki Matsuda	March 14, 1977 (aged 26)	cm / kg	24	1						
4	DF	Yasuhiro Hato	May 4, 1976 (aged 27)	cm / kg	1	0						
5	DF	Dutra	August 11, 1973 (aged 30)	cm / kg	22	0						
6	MF	Yoshiharu Ueno	April 21, 1973 (aged 30)	cm / kg	22	3						
7	MF	Yukihiko Sato	May 11, 1976 (aged 27)	cm / kg	16	2						
8	MF	Yoo Sang-Chul	October 16, 1971 (aged 32)	cm / kg	19	0						
9	FW	Tatsuhiko Kubo	June 18, 1976 (aged 27)	cm / kg	19	4						
10	MF	Akihiro Endō	September 18, 1975 (aged 28)	cm / kg	22	1						
11	FW	Daisuke Sakata	January 16, 1983 (aged 21)	cm / kg	28	10						
14	MF	Daisuke Oku	February 7, 1976 (aged 28)	cm / kg	25	10						
16	GK	Hiroshi Sato	March 7, 1972 (aged 32)	cm / kg	0	0						
17	DF	Hayuma Tanaka	July 31, 1982 (aged 21)	cm / kg	23	1						
18	FW	Norihisa Shimizu	October 4, 1976 (aged 27)	cm / kg	14	1						
19	FW	Sotaro Yasunaga	April 20, 1976 (aged 27)	cm / kg	7	0						
20	MF	Yuki Kaneko	May 29, 1982 (aged 21)	cm / kg	0	0						
21	GK	Tetsuya Enomoto	May 2, 1983 (aged 20)	cm / kg	0	0						
22	DF	Yuji Nakazawa	February 25, 1978 (aged 26)	cm / kg	27	1						
23	MF	Masahiro Ōhashi	June 23, 1981 (aged 22)	cm / kg	8	0						
25	MF	Yuji Goto	August 20, 1985 (aged 18)	cm / kg	0	0						
26	MF	Daisuke Nasu	October 10, 1981 (aged 22)	cm / kg	24	1						
27	FW	Masato Yamazaki	December 4, 1981 (aged 22)	cm / kg	13	0						
28	MF	Nobuki Hara	September 6, 1979 (aged 24)	cm / kg	1	0						
29	FW	Yutaro Abe	October 5, 1984 (aged 19)	cm / kg	0	0						
30	DF	Yuzo Kurihara	September 18, 1983 (aged 20)	cm / kg	8	0						
31	GK	Kenichi Shimokawa	May 14, 1970 (aged 33)	cm / kg	0	0						
32	MF	Yukihiro Yamase	April 22, 1984 (aged 19)	cm / kg	0	0						
33	FW	Sho Kitano	November 20, 1984 (aged 19)	cm / kg	0	0						
34	DF	Kei Omoto	July 21, 1984 (aged 19)	cm / kg	0	0						
35	MF	Ryuji Kawai	July 14, 1978 (aged 25)	cm / kg	9	0						
36	FW	Ahn Jung-Hwan	January 27, 1976 (aged 28)	cm / kg	25	12						

== Kits ==
Home	Home AFC CL	Away	Away Alternate

== Other pages ==
- (in Japanese) J.League official site
