= 2003 Yokohama F. Marinos season =

Yokohama F. Marinos
2003 season
- Manager: Takeshi Okada
- Stadium: International Stadium Yokohama
- J.League 1: Champions
- Emperor's Cup: Quarterfinals
- J.League Cup: Quarterfinals
- Top goalscorer: Tatsuhiko Kubo (16)
- Average home league attendance: 24,957
Home colours	Away colours

2003 Yokohama F. Marinos season

== Competitions ==
Competitions	Position
J.League 1	Champions / 16 clubs
Emperor's Cup	Quarterfinals
J.League Cup	Quarterfinals

== Domestic results ==
=== J.League 1 ===
Match	Date	Venue	Opponents	Score
1-1	2003.3.21	Shizuoka Stadium	Júbilo Iwata	4-2
1-2	2003.4.5	International Stadium Yokohama	Vegalta Sendai	1-1
1-3	2003.4.12	Ajinomoto Stadium	Tokyo Verdy 1969	3-0
1-4	2003.4.20	International Stadium Yokohama	Oita Trinita	1-0
1-5	2003.4.26	Ichihara Seaside Stadium	JEF United Ichihara	1-3
1-6	2003.4.29	International Stadium Yokohama	Nagoya Grampus Eight	0-0
1-7	2003.5.5	Kashima Soccer Stadium	Kashima Antlers	3-1
1-8	2003.5.10	International Stadium Yokohama	FC Tokyo	3-2
1-9	2003.5.17	Hitachi Kashiwa Soccer Stadium	Kashiwa Reysol	1-3
1-10	2003.5.25	International Stadium Yokohama	Urawa Red Diamonds	0-1
1-11	2003.7.5	National Olympic Stadium (Tokyo)	Shimizu S-Pulse	1-0
1-12	2003.7.12	International Stadium Yokohama	Kyoto Purple Sanga	2-1
1-13	2003.7.19	Nagai Stadium	Cerezo Osaka	4-1
1-14	2003.7.26	Osaka Expo '70 Stadium	Gamba Osaka	2-1
1-15	2003.8.2	International Stadium Yokohama	Vissel Kobe	3-0
2-1	2003.8.16	International Stadium Yokohama	Tokyo Verdy 1969	2-2
2-2	2003.8.23	Ōita Stadium	Oita Trinita	1-1
2-3	2003.8.30	Ajinomoto Stadium	FC Tokyo	1-4
2-4	2003.9.6	International Stadium Yokohama	Kashiwa Reysol	1-0
2-5	2003.9.13	Saitama Stadium 2002	Urawa Red Diamonds	3-0
2-6	2003.9.20	International Stadium Yokohama	Shimizu S-Pulse	5-1
2-7	2003.9.23	Kobe Wing Stadium	Vissel Kobe	1-1
2-8	2003.9.27	International Stadium Yokohama	Gamba Osaka	1-0
2-9	2003.10.4	International Stadium Yokohama	JEF United Ichihara	1-0
2-10	2003.10.18	Nishikyogoku Athletic Stadium	Kyoto Purple Sanga	0-0
2-11	2003.10.26	National Olympic Stadium (Tokyo)	Cerezo Osaka	2-2
2-12	2003.11.9	Toyota Stadium	Nagoya Grampus Eight	2-3
2-13	2003.11.15	International Stadium Yokohama	Kashima Antlers	1-2
2-14	2003.11.22	Sendai Stadium	Vegalta Sendai	4-0
2-15	2003.11.29	International Stadium Yokohama	Júbilo Iwata	2-1

=== Emperor's Cup ===
Match	Date	Venue	Opponents	Score
3rd round	2003..			-
4th round	2003..			-
Quarterfinals	2003..			-

=== J.League Cup ===
Match	Date	Venue	Opponents	Score
GL-B-1	2003..			-
GL-B-2	2003..			-
GL-B-3	2003..			-
GL-B-4	2003..			-
GL-B-5	2003..			-
GL-B-6	2003..			-
Quarterfinals-1	2003..			-
Quarterfinals-2	2003..			-

== Player statistics ==
No.	Pos.	Player	D.o.B. (Age)	Height / Weight	J.League 1		Emperor's Cup		J.League Cup		Total	
No.	Pos.	Player	D.o.B. (Age)	Height / Weight	Apps	Goals	Apps	Goals	Apps	Goals	Apps	Goals
1	GK	Tatsuya Enomoto	March 16, 1979 (aged 23)	cm / kg	15	0						
2	MF	Yoo Sang-Chul	October 18, 1971 (aged 31)	cm / kg	17	6						
3	DF	Naoki Matsuda	March 14, 1977 (aged 25)	cm / kg	20	0						
4	DF	Yasuhiro Hato	May 4, 1976 (aged 26)	cm / kg	10	0						
5	DF	Dutra	August 11, 1973 (aged 29)	cm / kg	28	1						
6	MF	Yoshiharu Ueno	April 21, 1973 (aged 29)	cm / kg	4	0						
7	MF	Yukihiko Sato	May 11, 1976 (aged 26)	cm / kg	27	1						
8	MF	Akihiro Endō	September 18, 1975 (aged 27)	cm / kg	26	3						
9	FW	Tatsuhiko Kubo	June 18, 1976 (aged 26)	cm / kg	25	16						
11	FW	Norihisa Shimizu	October 4, 1976 (aged 26)	cm / kg	21	2						
13	MF	Kunio Nagayama	September 16, 1970 (aged 32)	cm / kg	8	0						
14	MF	Daisuke Oku	February 7, 1976 (aged 27)	cm / kg	26	5						
15	DF	Kazuyoshi Mikami	August 29, 1975 (aged 27)	cm / kg	6	0						
16	GK	Hiroshi Sato	March 7, 1972 (aged 31)	cm / kg	0	0						
17	MF	Kazuki Sato	June 27, 1974 (aged 28)	cm / kg	7	0						
18	FW	Daisuke Sakata	January 16, 1983 (aged 20)	cm / kg	25	6						
19	FW	Sotaro Yasunaga	April 20, 1976 (aged 26)	cm / kg	8	1						
20	MF	Yuki Kaneko	May 29, 1982 (aged 20)	cm / kg	1	0						
21	GK	Tetsuya Enomoto	May 2, 1983 (aged 19)	cm / kg	15	0						
22	DF	Yuji Nakazawa	February 25, 1978 (aged 25)	cm / kg	29	4						
23	MF	Masahiro Ōhashi	June 23, 1981 (aged 21)	cm / kg	4	1						
24	MF	Takumi Motohashi	August 3, 1982 (aged 20)	cm / kg	1	0						
25	DF	Shogo Kobara	November 2, 1982 (aged 20)	cm / kg	1	0						
26	MF	Daisuke Nasu	October 10, 1981 (aged 21)	cm / kg	29	2						
27	MF	Daisuke Goto	April 25, 1982 (aged 20)	cm / kg	0	0						
28	MF	Hirotaka Iida	April 29, 1982 (aged 20)	cm / kg	0	0						
29	FW	Yutaro Abe	October 5, 1984 (aged 18)	cm / kg	6	0						
30	DF	Yuzo Kurihara	September 18, 1983 (aged 19)	cm / kg	7	0						
31	GK	Kenichi Shimokawa	May 14, 1970 (aged 32)	cm / kg	1	0						
32	MF	Yukihiro Yamase	April 22, 1984 (aged 18)	cm / kg	0	0						
33	FW	Sho Kitano	November 20, 1984 (aged 18)	cm / kg	2	0						
34	DF	Kei Omoto	July 21, 1984 (aged 18)	cm / kg	0	0						
35	MF	Ryuji Kawai	July 14, 1978 (aged 24)	cm / kg	11	0						
36	FW	Marquinhos	March 23, 1976 (aged 26)	cm / kg	24	8						

== Kits ==
Home	Away	Away Alternate

== Other pages ==
- (in Japanese) J.League official site
