= History of Shimizu S-Pulse =

Shimizu S-Pulse (清水エスパルス, Shimizu Esuparusu) has spent 14 seasons in the top flight of Japanese football, the J. League. During those seasons, the club has been quite successful in the domestic cup competitions, winning the Emperor's Cup, the J. League Cup, the Asian Cup Winners Cup and the Japanese Super Cup twice. The club has also reached five other cup finals.

== Foundation (1991) ==
S-Pulse was formed in February, 1991 as Shimizu FC. Unlike most other Japanese football clubs at the time, S-Pulse did not start as a company team, instead starting out as a group of players who were born in Shizuoka. The team was originally run by the company S-Lap Communications, with funding from the citizens and Shizuoka Television.

Two months later, the club name was officially changed to Shimizu S-Pulse. S-Pulse is a combination of the S from Shizuoka, Shimizu, and Soccer, and Pulse from English to mean the spirit of all those who support the team.

A previous representative of the city in the old Japan Soccer League had been Nippon Light Metal S.C., who was a co-founder of the Second Division and competed in it for three seasons (being renamed Hagoromo Club in 1973 and relegated as such in 1974, to fold in the Tokai League in 1975).

== Joining the J. League (1992-1993) ==
After being approved for participation in the J. League, S-Pulse competed in the 1992 J. League Cup. They started well, winning 5 of their 9 group stage matches to finish 2nd in the group and qualify for the semi-finals. They then went on to defeat Nagoya Grampus Eight, qualifying for their first cup final However, the dream start ended with defeat at the hands of Verdy Kawasaki in the final. S-Pulse also took part in the 72nd Emperor's Cup but their run was ended by Yokohama Marinos in the quarter-finals.

In 1993, S-Pulse became one of the ten founder members of the top division. In the first stage, they won 10 of 18 matches to finish 4th in the table. The second stage was even better; 14 wins put them in 2nd place. Their second venture into the J. League Cup was another near miss. After finishing top of Group B they defeated Gamba Osaka in the semi-finals only to lose in the final once again to Verdy Kawasaki. S-Pulse continued their good cup form in the 73rd Emperor's Cup; reaching the semi-finals before being knocked out by Kashima Antlers.

== The End of the Nineties (1994 to 1999) ==
S-Pulse's great cup record came to an end in 1994; they exited the J. League Cup in round 2 and then exiting the Emperor's Cup in round 1. Their league campaign went much better; 2nd in the first stage and 6th in the second stage.

1995 was an even worse year for S-Pulse. They finished 12th out of 14 clubs in the first stage of the league; their lowest yet. They did manage to recover in the second stage, finishing 4th. But with no J. League Cup being staged and an exit from the Emperor's Cup in round 1, it was another poor year in the cup for the club.

The 1996 season was an improvement on the last season. A 10th-place finish in the league was backed up by an Emperor's Cup run that took S-Pulse to the quarter-finals. However, the real success of the season was the J. League Cup. After finishing top in their group, S-Pulse made it to the final, defeating Bellmare Hiratsuka 5–0 in the semi-finals. For the third time, Verdy Kawasaki stood between S-Pulse and the J. League Cup. In the final, S-Pulse let a 2–0 lead slip and the match went to penalties after a 3–3 draw. S-Pulse won the match 5–4 on penalties to claim their first cup title.

1997 and 1998 saw further improvements in the league; S-Pulse narrowly missed out on a 1st-place finish in the first stage of 1998 on goal difference. However, they failed to win any more silverware, coming closest in the 1998 Emperor's Cup with a 2–1 defeat in the final to Yokohama Flügels. Also in 1998, Shizuoka Television withdrew their funding. The club was reorganized under local companies under the leadership of Suzuyo.

1999 began with S-Pulse's first appearance in the Japanese Super Cup, replacing Yokohama Flügels (Flügels merged with Yokohama Marinos at the end of the 1998 season). However, S-Pulse lost the match 2–1. S-Pulse finished 3rd in the first stage of the league and then went on to win the second stage. The title deciding matches saw S-Pulse take on their local rivals, Júbilo Iwata. After a 2–1 defeat and then a 2–1 victory, S-Pulse lost the tie 4–2 on penalties. The great season was capped off by two good cup runs, both ending with defeat in the quarter-finals.

== New Millennium (2000 to 2005) ==
The new millennium brought even better results for S-Pulse. Victory in the Asian Cup Winners Cup in 2000 and victory in the final of the Emperor's Cup in 2001 meant that the S-Pulse trophy cabinet was beginning to fill up. Victories in the 2001 and 2002 Japanese Super Cups meant that the club had won four cups in three years. However, the cup successes masked league results that were beginning to get worse. After finishing 4th in both stages of the 2001 season, S-Pulse spent the next four seasons in mid-table.

Despite the poor league form, the cup runs continued. Two semi final defeats in 2003 were followed by a quarter final defeat in 2004. In 2005, S-Pulse reached the J. League Cup quarter final once again. They closed the year with a run to the Emperor's Cup final in which they did not concede a single goal. However, this changed in the final against Urawa Red Diamonds, which they lost 2–1.

== Last Season (2006) ==
S-Pulse started the 2006 season with three victories in a row and continued to show good form throughout the season, finishing in 4th place. However, their participation in the J. League Cup ended at the group stage after they only managed to pick up 8 points. After finishing the league season on a high, S-Pulse went on to reach the quarter-finals of the Emperor's Cup but their run ended with defeat at the hands of Kashima Antlers. S-Pulse has now gone four seasons without winning any silverware.

== League Record ==
Season	League	Place	GP	Pts	Win	Draw	Lose	Average Crowd
1993	J1 1st stage	4 / 10	18	-	11	-	7	18,462
1993	J1 2nd stage	Runners-up / 10	18	-	14	-	4	18,462
1993	J1 Total	3 / 10	36	-	25	-	11	18,462
1994	J1 1st stage	Runners-up / 12	22	-	16	-	6	19,726
1994	J1 2nd stage	6 / 12	22	-	11	-	11	19,726
1994	J1 Total	4 / 12	44	-	27	-	17	19,726
1995	J1 1st stage	12 / 14	26	30	10	-	16	19,747
1995	J1 2nd stage	4 / 14	26	45	15	-	11	19,747
1995	J1 Total	9 / 14	52	75	25	-	27	19,747
1996	J1	10 / 16	30	37	12	-	18	12,962
1997	J1 1st stage	7 / 17	16	25	9	-	7	9,888
1997	J1 2nd stage	6 / 17	16	29	10	-	6	9,888
1997	J1 Total	5 / 17	32	54	19	-	13	9,888
1998	J1 1st stage	Runners-up / 18	17	39	13	-	4	12,298
1998	J1 2nd stage	5 / 18	17	31	12	-	5	12,298
1998	J1 Total	3 / 18	34	70	25	-	9	12,298
1999	J1 1st stage	3 / 16	15	30	10	1	4	12,883
1999	J1 2nd stage	Champions / 16	15	33	11	1	3	12,883
1999	J1 Total	Runners-up / 16	30	63	21	2	7	12,883
2000	J1 1st stage	3 / 16	15	28	10	0	5	12,422
2000	J1 2nd stage	13 / 16	15	14	5	2	8	12,422
2000	J1 Total	8 / 16	30	42	15	2	13	12,422
2001	J1 1st stage	4 / 16	15	26	10	0	5	15,973
2001	J1 2nd stage	4 / 16	15	23	9	0	6	15,973
2001	J1 Total	4 / 16	30	49	19	0	11	15,973
2002	J1 1st stage	7 / 16	15	24	8	3	4	14,963
2002	J1 2nd stage	12 / 16	15	17	6	0	9	14,963
2002	J1 Total	8 / 16	30	41	14	3	13	14,963
2003	J1 1st stage	11 / 16	15	18	5	3	7	16,284
2003	J1 2nd stage	10 / 16	15	21	6	3	6	16,284
2003	J1 Total	11 / 16	30	39	11	6	13	16,284
2004	J1 1st stage	11 / 16	15	16	3	7	5	13,568
2004	J1 2nd stage	14 / 16	15	13	4	1	10	13,568
2004	J1 Total	14 / 16	30	29	7	8	15	13,568
2005	J1	15 / 18	34	39	9	12	13	12,752
2006	J1	4 / 18	34	60	18	6	10	14,302
2007	J1	4 / 18	34	61	18	7	9	15,441
