= List of RB Omiya Ardija records and statistics =

This article contains records and statistics for the Japanese professional football club, RB Omiya Ardija.

== J.League ==
Year	League	Place	GP	Pts	Win	Draw	Lose	Average Crowd
1999	J2	6 / 10	36	51	18	1	7	2,674
2000	J2	4 / 11	40	68	23	1	16	3,477
2001	J2	5 / 12	44	78	26	6	12	3,864
2002	J2	6 / 12	44	59	14	17	13	5,266
2003	J2	6 / 12	44	61	18	7	19	5,058
2004	J2	Runners-up / 12	44	87	26	9	9	6,108
2005	J1	13 / 18	34	41	12	5	17	9,980
2006	J1	12 / 18	34	44	13	5	16	10,234
2007	J1	15 / 18	34	35	8	11	15	11,741
2008	J1	12 / 18	34	43	12	7	15	10,714
2009	J1	13 / 18	34	39	9	12	13	13,707
2010	J1	12 / 18	34	42	11	9	14	11,064
2011	J1	13 / 18	34	42	10	12	12	9,099

Key to colors
Played in 1st division league
Played in 2nd division league

== Domestic cup competitions ==
Year	Emperor's Cup	J. League Cup
1999	3rd Round	1st Round
2000	3rd Round	1st Round
2001	1st Round	1st Round
2002	4th Round	-
2003	3rd Round	-
2004	5th Round	-
2005	Semi-finals	Quarter-finals
2006	5th Round	Group Stage
2007	4th Round	Group Stage
2008	5th Round	Group Stage
2009	3rd Round	Group Stage
2010	4th Round	Group Stage
2011	2nd Round	2nd Round

== Top scorers by season ==
Season	Player	Domestic league	Ref
2011	(Brazil) Rafael	10	
2010	(Japan) Naoki Ishihara	9	
