= Sotaro Yasunaga =

Japanese footballer and manager

Sotaro Yasunaga 安永 聡太郎
Personal information
- Full name: Sotaro Yasunaga
- Date of birth: April 20, 1976 (age 50)
- Place of birth: Ube, Yamaguchi, Japan
- Height: 1.78 m (5 ft 10 in)
- Position: Forward

Team information
- Current team: Angkor Tiger (head coach)

Youth career
- 1992–1994: Shimizu Commercial High School

Senior career*
Years	Team	Apps	(Gls)
1995–1998	Yokohama Marinos	67	(9)
1997–1998	→ Lleida (loan)	34	(4)
1999–2001	Shimizu S-Pulse	65	(10)
2001–2004	Yokohama F. Marinos	25	(1)
2002	→ Racing Ferrol (loan)	12	(1)
2005	Kashiwa Reysol	8	(1)
Total		211	(26)

International career
1995	Japan U-20	4	(1)

Managerial career
- 2016–2017: SC Sagamihara
- 2025–: Angkor Tiger
Medal record
Yokohama F. Marinos
Winner	J1 League	1995
Winner	J1 League	2003
Winner	J1 League	2004
Runner-up	J1 League	2002
Winner	J.League Cup	2001
Shimizu S-Pulse
Runner-up	J1 League	1999
Winner	Emperor's Cup	2001
Runner-up	Emperor's Cup	2000
- * Club domestic league appearances and goals

Sotaro Yasunaga (安永 聡太郎, Yasunaga Sōtarō; born April 20, 1976) is a Japanese former footballer and manager who is currently the head coach of Cambodian Premier League club Angkor Tiger.

== Club career ==
Yasunaga was born in Ube on April 20, 1976. After graduating from Shimizu Commercial High School, he joined Yokohama Marinos (later Yokohama F. Marinos) in 1995. In the 1995 season, he played many matches and won the champions J1 League.

In 1997, he moved to Segunda División club Lleida. He returned to Yokohama Marinos in 1998 and he moved to Shimizu S-Pulse in 1999. He played as regular player and won the 2nd place 1999 J1 League.

In Asia, the club won the champions 1999–2000 Asian Cup Winners' Cup. He returned to Yokohama F. Marinos in September 2001. However he could hardly play in the match and he moved to Segunda División club Racing Ferrol in 2002. He returned to Yokohama F. Marinos in 2003. He moved to Kashiwa Reysol in 2005 and retired by the end of the 2005 season.

== National team career ==
In April 1995, Yasunaga was selected Japan U-20 national team for 1995 World Youth Championship. He played full-time in all 4 matches and scored a goal against Burundi.

== Managerial career ==
On 20 August 2016, Yasunaga became a manager of J3 League club SC Sagamihara as Norihiro Satsukawa successor. However, Hhe resigned end of 2017 season.

On 29 May 2025, Yasunaga became the manager of Cambodian Premier League club Angkor Tiger ahead of the 2025–26 season.

== Club statistics ==
Club performance			League		Cup		League Cup		Total	
Season	Club	League	Apps	Goals	Apps	Goals	Apps	Goals	Apps	Goals
Japan			League		Emperor's Cup		J.League Cup		Total	
1995	Yokohama Marinos	J1 League	28	1	2	0	-		30	1
1996	Yokohama Marinos	J1 League	11	1	1	0	6	0	18	1
1997	Yokohama Marinos	J1 League	9	1	0	0	6	2	15	3
Spain			League		Copa del Rey		Copa de la Liga		Total	
1997/98	Lleida	Segunda División	34	4					34	4
Japan			League		Emperor's Cup		J.League Cup		Total	
1998	Yokohama Marinos	J1 League	19	6	1	0	3	0	23	6
1999	Shimizu S-Pulse	J1 League	29	5	2	0	3	0	34	5
2000	Shimizu S-Pulse	J1 League	24	3	3	1	4	2	31	6
2001	Shimizu S-Pulse	J1 League	12	2	0	0	0	0	12	2
2001	Yokohama F. Marinos	J1 League	6	0	1	0	0	0	7	0
2002	Yokohama F. Marinos	J1 League	4	0	0	0	1	0	5	0
Spain			League		Copa del Rey		Copa de la Liga		Total	
2002/03	Racing Ferrol	Segunda División	12	1	1	1			13	2
Japan			League		Emperor's Cup		J.League Cup		Total	
2003	Yokohama F. Marinos	J1 League	8	1	2	1	3	0	13	2
2004	Yokohama F. Marinos	J1 League	7	0	2	0	4	0	13	0
2005	Kashiwa Reysol	J1 League	8	1	0	0	3	0	11	1
Country	Japan		165	23	14	2	33	4	212	29
Country	Spain		46	5	1	1			47	6
Total			211	28	15	3	33	4	259	35

== Managerial statistics ==
Team	From	To	Record				
Team	From	To	G	W	D	L	Win %
SC Sagamihara	2016	2017	42	10	14	18	23.81
Total			42	10	14	18	23.81
