= Akihiro Endō =

Japanese footballer

Akihiro Endō 遠藤 彰弘
Personal information
- Full name: Akihiro Endō
- Date of birth: 18 September 1975 (age 51)
- Place of birth: Kagoshima, Japan
- Height: 1.73 m (5 ft 8 in)
- Position: Midfielder

Youth career
- 1991–1993: Kagoshima Jitsugyo High School

Senior career*
Years	Team	Apps	(Gls)
1994–2005	Yokohama F. Marinos	210	(14)
2005–2007	Vissel Kobe	19	(0)
Total		229	(14)

International career
1996	Japan U-23	1	(0)
- * Club domestic league appearances and goals

Akihiro Endo (遠藤 彰弘, Endō Akihiro; born 18 September 1975) is a Japanese former footballer who played as a midfielder. His younger brother Yasuhito is also a footballer.

== Club career ==
Endō was born in Kagoshima on 18 September 1975. After graduating from high school, he joined Yokohama Marinos (later Yokohama F. Marinos) in 1994. He debuted in 1995 and he played many matches as midfielder after the debut. In 1995, the club won the champions J1 League. From 1999, he became a regular player and the club won 2001 J.League Cup, 2003 and 2004 J1 League. However his opportunity to play decreased in 2005 and he moved to Vissel Kobe in July 2005. He retired end of 2007 season.

== International career ==
In July 1996, Endō was selected to the Japan U-23 national team for the 1996 Summer Olympics. At this tournament, he wore the number 10 shirt for Japan and played the first match against Brazil. Japan won against Brazil, and it was known as the "Miracle of Miami" (マイアミの奇跡) in Japan.

== Club statistics ==
Club performance			League		Cup		League Cup		Continental		Total	
Season	Club	League	Apps	Goals	Apps	Goals	Apps	Goals	Apps	Goals	Apps	Goals
Japan			League		Emperor's Cup		J.League Cup		Asia		Total	
1994	Yokohama Marinos	J1 League	0	0	0	0	0	0	-		0	0
1995	Yokohama Marinos	J1 League	19	0	1	0	-		-		20	0
1996	Yokohama Marinos	J1 League	2	1	0	0	4	0	-		6	1
1997	Yokohama Marinos	J1 League	15	0	2	0	3	0	-		20	0
1998	Yokohama Marinos	J1 League	16	1	1	0	0	0	-		17	1
1999	Yokohama F. Marinos	J1 League	29	4	3	0	2	0	-		34	4
2000	Yokohama F. Marinos	J1 League	29	3	3	0	5	0	-		37	3
2001	Yokohama F. Marinos	J1 League	30	1	1	0	8	2	-		39	3
2002	Yokohama F. Marinos	J1 League	20	0	2	0	4	1	-		26	1
2003	Yokohama F. Marinos	J1 League	26	3	3	0	7	1	-		36	4
2004	Yokohama F. Marinos	J1 League	22	1	1	0	4	0	2	0	29	1
2005	Yokohama F. Marinos	J1 League	2	0	0	0	0	0	-		2	0
2005	Vissel Kobe	J1 League	15	0	0	0	0	0	-		15	0
2006	Vissel Kobe	J2 League	1	0	1	0	-		-		2	0
2007	Vissel Kobe	J1 League	3	0	0	0	3	0	-		6	0
Total			229	14	18	0	40	4	2	0	289	18
