= Yutaro Abe =

Japanese footballer (born 1984)

Yutaro Abe 阿部 祐大朗
Personal information
- Full name: Yutaro Abe
- Date of birth: October 5, 1984 (age 42)
- Place of birth: Machida, Tokyo, Japan
- Height: 1.83 m (6 ft 0 in)
- Position: Forward

Youth career
- 2000–2002: Toin Gakuen High School

Senior career*
Years	Team	Apps	(Gls)
2002–2004	Yokohama F. Marinos	9	(0)
2005–2006	Montedio Yamagata	35	(5)
2007	Ferverosa Ishikawa Hakusan FC	11	(4)
2007–2008	Tokushima Vortis	27	(2)
2009–2011	Gainare Tottori	67	(14)
Total		149	(25)

International career
2001	Japan U-17	2	(1)
2003	Japan U-20	4	(0)
Medal record
Yokohama F. Marinos
Winner	J1 League	2003
Winner	J1 League	2004
Runner-up	J1 League	2002
Representing Japan
AFC U-19 Championship
Silver medal – second place	2002 Qatar
- * Club domestic league appearances and goals

Yutaro Abe (阿部 祐大朗, Abe Yūtarō; born October 5, 1984) is a former Japanese football player.

== Club career ==
Abe was born in Machida on October 5, 1984. When he was a high school student, he joined Yokohama F. Marinos in 2002. However he could hardly play in the match, he moved to J2 League club Montedio Yamagata in 2005. Although he played many matches in 2005, his opportunity to play decreased in 2006. In 2007, he moved to Regional Leagues club Ferverosa Ishikawa Hakusan FC. In July 2007, he moved to J2 League club Tokushima Vortis. In 2009, he moved to Japan Football League club Gainare Tottori. He played as regular player and the club was promoted to J2 League end of 2010 season. He retired end of 2011 season.

== National team career ==
In September 2001, Abe was selected Japan U-17 national team for 2001 U-17 World Championship. He played 2 matches and scored a goal against United States in first match. In November 2003, he was also selected Japan U-20 national team for 2003 World Youth Championship. He played 4 matches.

== Club statistics ==
Club performance			League		Cup		League Cup		Continental		Total	
Season	Club	League	Apps	Goals	Apps	Goals	Apps	Goals	Apps	Goals	Apps	Goals
Japan			League		Emperor's Cup		J.League Cup		Asia		Total	
2002	Yokohama F. Marinos	J1 League	3	0	0	0	0	0	-		3	0
2003	Yokohama F. Marinos	J1 League	6	0	0	0	2	0	-		8	0
2004	Yokohama F. Marinos	J1 League	0	0	0	0	5	1	2	1	7	2
2005	Montedio Yamagata	J2 League	27	5	1	0	-		-		28	5
2006	Montedio Yamagata	J2 League	8	0	0	0	-		-		8	0
2007	Ferverosa Ishikawa Hakusan FC	Regional Leagues	11	4	-		-		-		11	4
2007	Tokushima Vortis	J2 League	3	0	0	0	-		-		3	0
2008	Tokushima Vortis	J2 League	24	2	0	0	-		-		24	2
2009	Gainare Tottori	Football League	30	5	1	0	-		-		31	5
2010	Gainare Tottori	Football League	24	8	0	0	-		-		24	8
2011	Gainare Tottori	J2 League	13	1	1	0	-		-		14	1
Total			149	25	3	0	7	1	2	1	161	27

== Honors ==
- 2000 AFC U-17 Championship Top Scorer
