= Football records and statistics in Japan =

This page details football records in Japan. Unless otherwise stated, records are taken from the J.League.

== J.League records (split-season era) ==
=== Most Titles ===
4, Kashima Antlers (1996, 1998, 2000, 2001)

=== Most Consecutive Titles ===
2, Joint record: Verdy Kawasaki- (1993–1994), Kashima Antlers (2000, 2001), Yokohama F. Marinos (2003, 2004)

== J.League Division 1 Records (single-season era) ==
=== Most Titles ===
3, Kashima Antlers (2007, 2008, 2009)

=== Most Consecutive Titles ===
3, Kashima Antlers (2007–2009)

=== Most Second Place Finishes ===
3, Kawasaki Frontale (2006, 2008, 2009)
