= Masahiro Ohashi =

Japanese footballer

Masahiro Ohashi 大橋 正博
Personal information
- Full name: Masahiro Ohashi
- Date of birth: June 23, 1981 (age 45)
- Place of birth: Yokohama, Japan
- Height: 1.68 m (5 ft 6 in)
- Position: Midfielder

Youth career
- 1997: Yokohama Marinos
- 1998: Yokohama Flügels
- 1999: Yokohama F. Marinos

Senior career*
| Years | Team | Apps | (Gls) |
| 1999–2005 | Yokohama F. Marinos | 40 | (2) |
| 2001 | →Mito HollyHock (loan) | 35 | (7) |
| 2002 | →Albirex Niigata (loan) | 4 | (0) |
| 2006 | Tokyo Verdy | 24 | (3) |
| 2007–2008 | Kawasaki Frontale | 38 | (5) |
| 2009 | Gangwon | 20 | (4) |
| 2010 | Mito HollyHock | 35 | (1) |
| 2011 | Gangwon | 4 | (0) |
| 2011–2012 | Matsumoto Yamaga FC | 32 | (1) |
| Total | | 232 | (23) |
Medal record
Yokohama F. Marinos
| Winner | J1 League | 2003 |
| Runner-up | J1 League | 2000 |
| Runner-up | J1 League | 2002 |
Kawasaki Frontale
| Runner-up | J1 League | 2008 |
| Runner-up | J.League Cup | 2007 |
- * Club domestic league appearances and goals

Masahiro Ohashi (大橋 正博, Ohashi Masahiro; born June 23, 1981) is a former Japanese football player.

== Playing career ==
Ohashi was born in Yokohama on June 23, 1981. He joined J1 League club Yokohama F. Marinos from youth team in 1999. He played several matches as offensive midfielder until 2000. In 2001, he moved to J2 League club Mito HollyHock on loan. He played many matches as regular player. In 2002, he returned to Yokohama F. Marinos. However he could hardly play in the match. In August 2002, he moved to J2 club Albirex Niigata on loan. In 2003, he returned to Yokohama F. Marinos. Although he could not play many matches until 2004, he became a regular player as offensive midfielder in 2005. In 2006, he moved to J2 club Tokyo Verdy and played many matches. In 2007, he moved to Kawasaki Frontale. He played many matches as substitute midfielder in 2 seasons. In 2009, he moved to South Korean club Gangwon FC. He is the third Japanese footballer who played in the K-League. Ohashi scored his first goal in the K-League in Gangwon FC, against Suwon Samsung Bluewings on May 2, 2009. In 2010, he returned to Japan and joined J2 club Mito HollyHock for the first time in 9 years. He played many matches as regular player. In 2011, he moved to Gangwon FC again. However he could not play at all in the match for injury and left the club in June. In August 2011, he returned to Japan and joined Japan Football League club Matsumoto Yamaga FC. The club was promoted to J2 from 2012. He retired end of 2012 season.

== Club statistics ==
| Club performance | | | League | | Cup | | League Cup | | Continental | | Total | |
| Season | Club | League | Apps | Goals | Apps | Goals | Apps | Goals | Apps | Goals | Apps | Goals |
| Japan | | | League | | Emperor's Cup | | League Cup | | Asia | | Total | |
|---|---|---|---|---|---|---|---|---|---|---|---|---|
| 1999 | Yokohama F. Marinos | J1 League | 2 | 0 | 0 | 0 | 0 | 0 | - | | 2 | 0 |
| 2000 | Yokohama F. Marinos | J1 League | 1 | 0 | 0 | 0 | 0 | 0 | - | | 1 | 0 |
| 2001 | Mito HollyHock | J2 League | 35 | 7 | 3 | 1 | 2 | 0 | - | | 40 | 8 |
| 2002 | Yokohama F. Marinos | J1 League | 0 | 0 | 0 | 0 | 3 | 0 | - | | 3 | 0 |
| 2002 | Albirex Niigata | J2 League | 4 | 0 | 0 | 0 | - | | - | | 4 | 0 |
| 2003 | Yokohama F. Marinos | J1 League | 4 | 1 | 1 | 0 | 2 | 0 | - | | 7 | 1 |
| 2004 | Yokohama F. Marinos | J1 League | 8 | 0 | 2 | 0 | 7 | 0 | 1 | 0 | 18 | 0 |
| 2005 | Yokohama F. Marinos | J1 League | 25 | 1 | 2 | 0 | 4 | 0 | 5 | 0 | 36 | 1 |
| 2006 | Tokyo Verdy | J2 League | 24 | 3 | 1 | 0 | - | | 1 | 0 | 26 | 3 |
| 2007 | Kawasaki Frontale | J1 League | 17 | 4 | 3 | 1 | 2 | 0 | 4 | 0 | 26 | 5 |
| 2008 | Kawasaki Frontale | J1 League | 21 | 1 | 2 | 0 | 6 | 0 | - | | 29 | 1 |
| South Korea | | | League | | KFA Cup | | League Cup | | Asia | | Total | |
| 2009 | Gangwon FC | K-League | 20 | 4 | 0 | 0 | 2 | 0 | - | | 22 | 4 |
| Japan | | | League | | Emperor's Cup | | League Cup | | Asia | | Total | |
| 2010 | Mito HollyHock | J2 League | 35 | 1 | 2 | 1 | - | | - | | 37 | 2 |
| South Korea | | | League | | KFA Cup | | League Cup | | Asia | | Total | |
| 2011 | Gangwon FC | K-League | 4 | 0 | 0 | 0 | 1 | 0 | - | | 5 | 0 |
| Japan | | | League | | Emperor's Cup | | League Cup | | Asia | | Total | |
| 2011 | Matsumoto Yamaga FC | Football League | 14 | 0 | 3 | 0 | - | | - | | 17 | 0 |
| 2012 | Matsumoto Yamaga FC | J2 League | 18 | 1 | 0 | 0 | - | | - | | 18 | 1 |
| Total | Japan | | 208 | 19 | 19 | 3 | 26 | 0 | 11 | 0 | 264 | 22 |
| Total | South Korea | | 24 | 4 | 0 | 0 | 3 | 0 | - | | 27 | 4 |
| Career total | | | 232 | 23 | 19 | 3 | 29 | 0 | 11 | 0 | 291 | 26 |

== Honours ==
Yokohama F. Marinos

- J1 League
  - Champion (2) : 2003, 2004
  - Runner-up (1) : 2000

Kawasaki Frontale

- J1 League Runner-up (1) : 2008
- J.League Cup Runner-up (1) : 2007
