= Noriyuki Sakemoto =

Japanese footballer

Noriyuki Sakemoto 酒本 憲幸
Personal information
- Full name: Noriyuki Sakemoto
- Date of birth: September 8, 1984 (age 42)
- Place of birth: Gobo, Wakayama, Japan
- Height: 1.75 m (5 ft 9 in)
- Position: Midfielder

Team information
- Current team: Kagoshima United FC
- Number: 20

Youth career
- 2000–2002: Hatsushiba Hashimoto High School

Senior career*
Years	Team	Apps	(Gls)
2003–2018	Cerezo Osaka	279	(12)
2016–2018	→ Cerezo Osaka U-23 (loan)	9	(0)
2019–	Kagoshima United FC		
Medal record
Cerezo Osaka
Winner	J.League Cup	2017
Winner	Emperor's Cup	2017
Runner-up	Emperor's Cup	2003
- * Club domestic league appearances and goals as of end of 2018 season

Noriyuki Sakemoto (酒本 憲幸, Sakemoto Noriyuki; born September 8, 1984) is a Japanese football player who played for Cerezo Osaka from 2003 to 2018 and Kagoshima United FC until 2022, when he retired. Osaka teammate Yusuke Maruhashi copied his playing style.

== Club statistics ==
Updated to 23 February 2018.

Club performance			League		Cup		League Cup		Continental		Total	
Season	Club	League	Apps	Goals	Apps	Goals	Apps	Goals	Apps	Goals	Apps	Goals
Japan			League		Emperor's Cup		J.League Cup		AFC		Total	
2003	Cerezo Osaka	J1 League	5	0	4	0	0	0	-		9	0
2004	Cerezo Osaka	J1 League	16	0	1	0	3	0	-		20	0
2005	Cerezo Osaka	J1 League	7	0	4	0	0	0	-		11	0
2006	Cerezo Osaka	J1 League	12	1	1	0	6	0	-		19	1
2007	Cerezo Osaka	J2 League	22	3	2	0	-		-		24	3
2008	Cerezo Osaka	J2 League	18	3	1	0	-		-		19	3
2009	Cerezo Osaka	J2 League	46	1	1	0	-		-		47	1
2010	Cerezo Osaka	J1 League	7	0	0	0	5	0	-		12	0
2011	Cerezo Osaka	J1 League	22	2	4	0	1	0	3	0	30	2
2012	Cerezo Osaka	J1 League	29	0	3	0	7	0	-		39	0
2013	Cerezo Osaka	J1 League	29	1	2	0	4	0	-		35	1
2014	Cerezo Osaka	J1 League	25	0	3	0	0	0	5	0	33	0
2015	Cerezo Osaka	J2 League	25	0	0	0	-		-		25	0
2016	Cerezo Osaka	J2 League	15	1	3	1	-		-		18	2
2016	Cerezo Osaka U-23	J3 League	1	0	-		-		-		1	0
2017	Cerezo Osaka	J1 League	0	0	3	0	5	0	-		8	0
2017	Cerezo Osaka U-23	J3 League	7	0	-		-		-		7	0
Career Total			286	12	32	1	31	0	8	0	357	13
