= Yoshiharu Ueno =

Japanese footballer

Yoshiharu Ueno 上野 良治
Personal information
- Full name: Yoshiharu Ueno
- Date of birth: April 21, 1973 (age 53)
- Place of birth: Saitama, Saitama, Japan
- Height: 1.81 m (5 ft 11 1/2 in)
- Position: Midfielder

Youth career
- 1989–1991: Bunan High School
- 1992–1993: Waseda University

Senior career*
Years	Team	Apps	(Gls)
1994–2007	Yokohama F. Marinos	287	(24)
Total		287	(24)

International career
2000	Japan	1	(0)
Medal record
Yokohama F. Marinos
Winner	J1 League	1995
Winner	J1 League	2003
Winner	J1 League	2004
Runner-up	J1 League	2000
Runner-up	J1 League	2002
Winner	J.League Cup	2001
- * Club domestic league appearances and goals

Yoshiharu Ueno (上野 良治, Ueno Yoshiharu; born April 21, 1973) is a former Japanese football player. He played for Japan national team.

== Club career ==
Ueno was born in Saitama on April 21, 1973. After dropped out from Waseda University, he joined Yokohama Marinos (later Yokohama F. Marinos) in 1994. Initially, he played as offensive midfielder. In 1997, he was converted to defensive midfielder and became a regular player. The club won the champions 2001 J.League Cup, 2003 and 2004 J1 League. He retired end of 2007 season.

== National team career ==
On June 6, 2000, Ueno debuted for Japan national team against Jamaica.

== Club statistics ==
Club performance			League		Cup		League Cup		Continental		Total	
Season	Club	League	Apps	Goals	Apps	Goals	Apps	Goals	Apps	Goals	Apps	Goals
Japan			League		Emperor's Cup		J.League Cup		Asia		Total	
1994	Yokohama Marinos	J1 League	15	1	3	0	0	0	-		18	1
1995	Yokohama Marinos	J1 League	5	2	2	0	-		-		7	2
1996	Yokohama Marinos	J1 League	16	0	1	0	6	0	-		23	0
1997	Yokohama Marinos	J1 League	30	2	2	0	5	1	-		37	3
1998	Yokohama Marinos	J1 League	32	3	1	0	4	0	-		37	3
1999	Yokohama F. Marinos	J1 League	28	3	3	0	5	1	-		36	4
2000	Yokohama F. Marinos	J1 League	23	1	3	0	6	1	-		32	2
2001	Yokohama F. Marinos	J1 League	25	4	1	0	6	1	-		32	5
2002	Yokohama F. Marinos	J1 League	30	2	2	0	6	0	-		38	2
2003	Yokohama F. Marinos	J1 League	4	0	3	0	2	0	-		9	0
2004	Yokohama F. Marinos	J1 League	22	3	0	0	6	0	3	0	31	3
2005	Yokohama F. Marinos	J1 League	26	2	2	0	3	0	3	1	34	3
2006	Yokohama F. Marinos	J1 League	25	0	0	0	8	1	-		33	1
2007	Yokohama F. Marinos	J1 League	6	1	0	0	3	0	-		9	1
Total			287	24	23	0	60	5	6	1	376	30

== National team statistics ==
Japan national team
Year	Apps	Goals
2000	1	0
Total	1	0

== J1 League Firsts ==
- Appearance: April 27, 1994. Yokohama Marinos 1 vs 2 Bellmare Hiratsuka, Mitsuzawa Stadium
- Goal: September 21, 1994. Yokohama Marinos 1 vs 2 Bellmare Hiratsuka, Mitsuzawa Stadium
