= Daisuke Sakata =

Japanese footballer

Daisuke Sakata 坂田 大輔
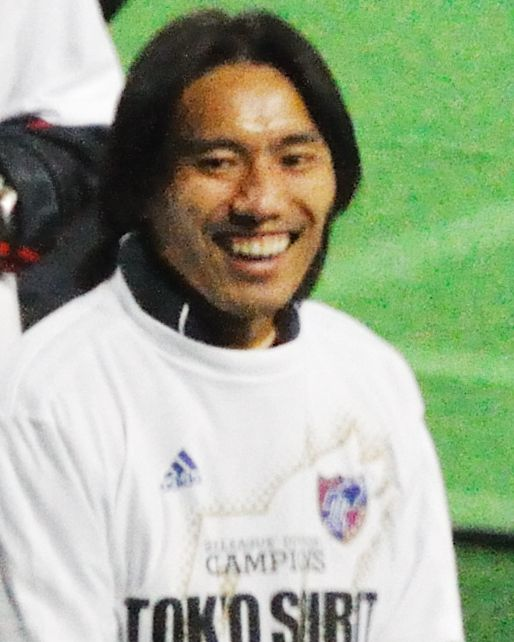

Personal information
- Full name: Daisuke Sakata
- Date of birth: January 16, 1983 (age 43)
- Place of birth: Yokohama, Kanagawa, Japan
- Height: 1.74 m (5 ft 8 1/2 in)
- Position: Forward

Youth career
- 1998: Yokohama Flügels
- 1999–2000: Yokohama F. Marinos

Senior career*
Years	Team	Apps	(Gls)
2001–2010	Yokohama F. Marinos	247	(46)
2011	Aris	6	(0)
2011	FC Tokyo	10	(1)
2012–2017	Avispa Fukuoka	201	(30)
Total		464	(77)

International career
2003	Japan U-20	4	(4)
2006	Japan	1	(0)
Medal record
Yokohama F. Marinos
Winner	J1 League	2003
Winner	J1 League	2004
Runner-up	J1 League	2002
Winner	J.League Cup	2001
FC Tokyo
Winner	Emperor's Cup	2011
Representing Japan
AFC U-19 Championship
Silver medal – second place	2002 Qatar
- * Club domestic league appearances and goals

Daisuke Sakata (坂田 大輔, Sakata Daisuke; born January 16, 1983) is a former Japanese football player. He played for Japan national team.

== Club career ==
He first played for Yokohama Flügels youth team but became a Yokohama F. Marinos youth player when both teams merged in 1999. He was promoted to the top team in 2001. His first league appearance came on June 16, 2001 in a 0-2 defeat by FC Tokyo at the International Stadium Yokohama. His first league goal came on August 18, 2001 when he scored the lone goal against Kashiwa Reysol at Kashiwanoha Stadium. He became a regular player from 2003. The club won the champions 2003 and 2004 J1 League.

Sakata joined Super League Greece side Aris in 2011 after ten years at Yokohama F. Marinos but only stayed for a short time before returning to FC Tokyo for the 2nd half of the season.

In January 2012 it was announced he had signed for Avispa Fukuoka in J2 League. Avispa won the 3rd place in 2015 J2 League and was promoted to J1 League. However Avispa finished at the bottom place in 2016 J1 League and was relegated to J2 in a year. He opted to retire end of 2017 season.

== National team career ==
He was a member of the Japan U-20 national team for the 2002 AFC Youth Championship in Qatar. The team finished runners-up and was qualified for the 2003 World Youth Championship.

At the World Youth Championship hosted by United Arab Emirates, he scored 4 goals in the tournament including against South Korea at knockout stage and became one of the top scorers along with Fernando Cavenaghi (Argentine), Dudu (Brazil) and Eddie Johnson (United States). The team exited at the quarter-final stage after beaten by Brazil.

He made his full international debut for Japan on August 9, 2006 in a friendly against Trinidad and Tobago at the Tokyo National Stadium when he replaced Alessandro Santos in the 86th minute.

== Personal life ==
Sakata married actress and TV Tarento Sayaka Fukuoka in February 2009．

== Club statistics ==
Club performance			League		Cup		League Cup		Continental		Total	
Season	Club	League	Apps	Goals	Apps	Goals	Apps	Goals	Apps	Goals	Apps	Goals
Japan			League		Emperor's Cup		J.League Cup		AFC		Total	
2001	Yokohama F. Marinos	J1 League	11	2	0	0	5	0	-		16	2
2002	Yokohama F. Marinos	J1 League	19	1	2	1	0	0	-		21	2
2003	Yokohama F. Marinos	J1 League	25	6	1	0	6	1	-		32	7
2004	Yokohama F. Marinos	J1 League	28	10	1	1	5	1	4	1	38	13
2005	Yokohama F. Marinos	J1 League	29	5	2	0	4	1	2	1	37	7
2006	Yokohama F. Marinos	J1 League	19	4	3	2	2	0	-		24	6
2007	Yokohama F. Marinos	J1 League	34	10	2	2	9	3	-		45	15
2008	Yokohama F. Marinos	J1 League	32	1	3	0	7	1	-		42	2
2009	Yokohama F. Marinos	J1 League	30	6	3	2	10	1	-		43	9
2010	Yokohama F. Marinos	J1 League	20	1	1	0	4	0	-		25	1
Greece			League		Greek Cup		League Cup		Europe		Total	
2011	Aris	Super League	6	0	–		–		–		6	0
Japan			League		Emperor's Cup		J.League Cup		AFC		Total	
2011	FC Tokyo	J2 League	10	1	2	0	–		–		12	1
2012	Avispa Fukuoka	J2 League	40	8	1	0	–		–		41	8
2013	Avispa Fukuoka	J2 League	40	11	0	0	–		–		40	11
2014	Avispa Fukuoka	J2 League	31	5	1	0	–		–		32	5
2015	Avispa Fukuoka	J2 League	35	3	3	0	–		–		38	3
2016	Avispa Fukuoka	J1 League	24	2	0	0	5	0	–		29	2
2017	Avispa Fukuoka	J2 League	31	1	0	0	–		–		31	1
Total	Japan		458	77	25	8	57	8	6	2	546	95
Total	Greece		6	0	–		–		–		6	0
Career total			464	77	25	8	57	8	6	2	552	95

== National team statistics ==
Japan national team
Year	Apps	Goals
2006	1	0
Total	1	0

== Honors and awards ==
=== Team honors ===
Yokohama F. Marinos

- J1 League: 2003, 2004
- J.League Cup: 2001
- Japanese Super Cup: 2004, 2005

=== Personal awards ===
- 2003 FIFA World Youth Championship: Silver Shoe
- J1 League Fair Play Player Award: 2007
