= 2002 Yokohama F. Marinos season =

Yokohama F. Marinos
2002 season
- Manager: Sebastião Lazaroni; Yoshiaki Shimojo
- Stadium: International Stadium Yokohama
- J.League 1: Runners-up
- Emperor's Cup: 4th Round
- J.League Cup: GL-C 3rd
- Top goalscorer: Will (14)
- Average home league attendance: 24,108
Home colours	Away colours	Third colours

2002 Yokohama F. Marinos season

== Competitions ==
Competitions	Position
J.League 1	Runners-up / 16 clubs
Emperor's Cup	4th Round
J.League Cup	GL-C 3rd / 4 clubs

== Domestic results ==
=== J.League 1 ===
Match	Date	Venue	Opponents	Score
1-1	2002.3.3	International Stadium Yokohama	Urawa Red Diamonds	1-0
1-2	2002.3.9	Toyota Stadium	Nagoya Grampus Eight	1-0
1-3	2002.3.16	Tokyo Stadium	F.C. Tokyo	1-1 a.e.t.
1-4	2002.3.31	Ichihara Seaside Stadium	JEF United Ichihara	3-0
1-5	2002.4.7	International Stadium Yokohama	Gamba Osaka	2-1 a.e.t. (sudden death)
1-6	2002.4.13	Hiroshima Big Arch	Sanfrecce Hiroshima	2-0
1-7	2002.4.20	Yamaha Stadium	Júbilo Iwata	3-1
1-8	2002.7.13	Mitsuzawa Stadium	Vegalta Sendai	2-0
1-9	2002.7.21	National Olympic Stadium (Tokyo)	Tokyo Verdy 1969	2-1
1-10	2002.7.24	Sapporo Dome	Consadole Sapporo	3-2 a.e.t. (sudden death)
1-11	2002.7.27	National Olympic Stadium (Tokyo)	Kashiwa Reysol	3-2 a.e.t. (sudden death)
1-12	2002.8.4	Nishikyogoku Athletic Stadium	Kyoto Purple Sanga	1-1 a.e.t.
1-13	2002.8.7	KKWing Stadium	Vissel Kobe	3-0
1-14	2002.8.11	Kashima Soccer Stadium	Kashima Antlers	1-2
1-15	2002.8.17	National Olympic Stadium (Tokyo)	Shimizu S-Pulse	0-0 a.e.t.
2-1	2002.8.31	Osaka Expo '70 Stadium	Gamba Osaka	1-4
2-2	2002.9.7	International Stadium Yokohama	Sanfrecce Hiroshima	1-2
2-3	2002.9.14	Sendai Stadium	Vegalta Sendai	0-1
2-4	2002.9.18	International Stadium Yokohama	Consadole Sapporo	1-0 a.e.t. (sudden death)
2-5	2002.9.21	Tokyo Stadium	Tokyo Verdy 1969	1-1 a.e.t.
2-6	2002.9.28	International Stadium Yokohama	F.C. Tokyo	2-1
2-7	2002.10.6	Mitsuzawa Stadium	Kyoto Purple Sanga	0-1
2-8	2002.10.13	National Olympic Stadium (Tokyo)	Kashiwa Reysol	1-0 a.e.t. (sudden death)
2-9	2002.10.19	International Stadium Yokohama	Kashima Antlers	2-0
2-10	2002.10.23	Kobe Universiade Memorial Stadium	Vissel Kobe	2-1 a.e.t. (sudden death)
2-11	2002.10.26	National Olympic Stadium (Tokyo)	Júbilo Iwata	1-3
2-12	2002.11.9	Nihondaira Sports Stadium	Shimizu S-Pulse	2-1
2-13	2002.11.16	International Stadium Yokohama	JEF United Ichihara	0-1
2-14	2002.11.23	International Stadium Yokohama	Nagoya Grampus Eight	1-0
2-15	2002.11.30	Urawa Komaba Stadium	Urawa Red Diamonds	1-0

=== Emperor's Cup ===
Match	Date	Venue	Opponents	Score
3rd Round	2002..			-
4th Round	2002..			-

=== J.League Cup ===
Match	Date	Venue	Opponents	Score
GL-C-1	2002..			-
GL-C-2	2002..			-
GL-C-3	2002..			-
GL-C-4	2002..			-
GL-C-5	2002..			-
GL-C-6	2002..			-

== Player statistics ==
No.	Pos.	Player	D.o.B. (Age)	Height / Weight	J.League 1		Emperor's Cup		J.League Cup		Total	
No.	Pos.	Player	D.o.B. (Age)	Height / Weight	Apps	Goals	Apps	Goals	Apps	Goals	Apps	Goals
1	GK	Tatsuya Enomoto	March 16, 1979 (aged 22)	cm / kg	30	0						
2	DF	Dutra	August 11, 1973 (aged 28)	cm / kg	25	1						
3	DF	Naoki Matsuda	March 14, 1977 (aged 24)	cm / kg	25	2						
4	DF	Yasuhiro Hato	May 4, 1976 (aged 25)	cm / kg	27	0						
5	DF	Jun Ideguchi	May 14, 1979 (aged 22)	cm / kg	0	0						
6	MF	Yoshiharu Ueno	April 21, 1973 (aged 28)	cm / kg	30	2						
7	DF	Nasa	December 8, 1968 (aged 33)	cm / kg	20	5						
8	MF	Akihiro Endō	September 18, 1975 (aged 26)	cm / kg	20	0						
9	FW	Will	December 15, 1973 (aged 28)	cm / kg	24	14						
10	MF	Shunsuke Nakamura	June 24, 1978 (aged 23)	cm / kg	8	4						
11	FW	Norihisa Shimizu	October 4, 1976 (aged 25)	cm / kg	26	2						
12	MF	Kazuki Sato	June 27, 1974 (aged 27)	cm / kg	1	0						
13	MF	Kunio Nagayama	September 16, 1970 (aged 31)	cm / kg	18	0						
14	MF	Daisuke Tonoike	January 29, 1975 (aged 27)	cm / kg	2	0						
15	MF	Masahiro Ōhashi	June 23, 1981 (aged 20)	cm / kg	0	0						
16	GK	Hiroshi Sato	March 7, 1972 (aged 29)	cm / kg	0	0						
17	FW	Ryosuke Kijima	May 29, 1979 (aged 22)	cm / kg	3	0						
18	MF	Naohiro Ishikawa	May 12, 1981 (aged 20)	cm / kg	0	0						
18	FW	Tomoyuki Hirase	May 23, 1977 (aged 24)	cm / kg	19	2						
19	FW	Sotaro Yasunaga	April 20, 1976 (aged 25)	cm / kg	4	0						
20	DF	Hayuma Tanaka	July 31, 1982 (aged 19)	cm / kg	0	0						
21	GK	Tetsuya Enomoto	May 2, 1983 (aged 18)	cm / kg	0	0						
22	MF	Yuki Kaneko	May 29, 1982 (aged 19)	cm / kg	1	0						
23	FW	Yutaka Tahara	April 27, 1982 (aged 19)	cm / kg	0	0						
24	MF	Léo	August 29, 1983 (aged 18)	cm / kg	0	0						
25	DF	Shogo Kobara	November 2, 1982 (aged 19)	cm / kg	5	0						
26	DF	Masahiro Kazuma	June 22, 1982 (aged 19)	cm / kg	1	0						
27	MF	Daisuke Goto	April 25, 1982 (aged 19)	cm / kg	0	0						
28	MF	Hirotaka Iida	April 29, 1982 (aged 19)	cm / kg	1	0						
29	FW	Daisuke Sakata	January 16, 1983 (aged 19)	cm / kg	19	1						
30	MF	Tatsunori Hisanaga	December 23, 1977 (aged 24)	cm / kg	20	2						
31	GK	Kenichi Shimokawa	May 14, 1970 (aged 31)	cm / kg	0	0						
32	DF	Kazuyoshi Mikami	August 29, 1975 (aged 26)	cm / kg	12	0						
33	FW	Yoichi Mori	August 1, 1980 (aged 21)	cm / kg	1	0						
34	DF	Takashi Azuma	November 21, 1979 (aged 22)	cm / kg	0	0						
35	DF	Yuzo Kurihara	September 18, 1983 (aged 18)	cm / kg	0	0						
36	MF	Daisuke Nasu	October 10, 1981 (aged 20)	cm / kg	3	0						
37	MF	Daisuke Oku	February 7, 1976 (aged 26)	cm / kg	26	7						
38	DF	Yuji Nakazawa	February 25, 1978 (aged 24)	cm / kg	27	1						
39	FW	Yutaro Abe	October 5, 1984 (aged 17)	cm / kg	3	0						
40	GK	Shinya Kato	September 19, 1980 (aged 21)	cm / kg	0	0						

== Other pages ==
- (in Japanese) J.League official site
