= Dutra (footballer, born 1973) =

Brazilian footballer

Personal information
- Full name: Antônio Monteiro Dutra
- Date of birth: August 11, 1973 (age 53)
- Place of birth: Duque Bacelar-MA, Brazil
- Height: 1.70 m (5 ft 7 in)
- Position: Left-back

Youth career
- 1990–1993: Bacabal-MA

Senior career*
Years	Team	Apps	(Gls)
1994	Paysandu	19	(0)
1995–1996	Mogi Mirim		
1997	Santos	13	(1)
1998	América-MG	20	(1)
1999	Coritiba	18	(1)
2000	Santos		
2000–2001	Sport Recife	17	(0)
2001–2006	Yokohama F. Marinos	147	(8)
2007–2011	Sport Recife	223	(8)
2011–2012	Santa Cruz	15	(2)
2012–2014	Yokohama F. Marinos	66	(1)
- * Club domestic league appearances and goals

Antônio Monteiro Dutra (born August 11, 1973), or simply Dutra, is a Brazilian former professional footballer who played as a left-back.

== Career statistics ==
Appearances and goals by club, season and competition
Club	Season	League			National cup (Note: Includes Emperor's Cup.)		League cup (Note: Includes J.League Cup.)		Continental		Other (Note: Includes Japanese Super Cup, J. League Championship, A3 Champions Cup.)		Total	
Club	Season	Division	Apps	Goals	Apps	Goals	Apps	Goals	Apps	Goals	Apps	Goals	Apps	Goals
Yokohama F. Marinos	2001	J1 League	12	3	1	0	4	0	–		–		17	3
Yokohama F. Marinos	2002	J1 League	25	1	2	0	5	1	–		–		32	2
Yokohama F. Marinos	2003	J1 League	28	1	3	1	7	0	–		–		38	2
Yokohama F. Marinos	2004	J1 League	22	0	1	0	4	1	5	2	6	0	38	3
Yokohama F. Marinos	2005	J1 League	32	1	2	0	4	0	5	1	4	0	47	2
Yokohama F. Marinos	2006	J1 League	28	2	0	0	4	0	–		–		32	2
Yokohama F. Marinos	2012	J1 League	29	0	2	0	1	0	–		–		32	0
Yokohama F. Marinos	2013	J1 League	33	1	5	0	9	0	–		–		47	1
Yokohama F. Marinos	2014	J1 League	4	0	1	0	0	0	2	0	1	0	8	0
Yokohama F. Marinos	Total		213	9	19	1	38	2	12	3	11	0	291	15

== Honours ==
Santos

- Torneio Rio-São Paulo: 1997

Coritiba

- Campeonato Paranaense: 1999

Yokohama F. Marinos

- J.League Cup: 2001
- J1 League : 2003, 2004
- Emperor's Cup: 2013

Sport

- Campeonato Pernambucano: 2007, 2008, 2009, 2010
- Copa do Brasil: 2008

Santa Cruz

- Campeonato Pernambucano: 2012

Individual

- J.League Best XI: 2003, 2004
