= 2001 Yokohama F. Marinos season =

Yokohama F. Marinos
2001 season
- Manager: Ardiles; Yoshiaki Shimojo; Lazaroni
- Stadium: International Stadium Yokohama
- J.League 1: 13th
- Emperor's Cup: 3rd Round
- J.League Cup: Champions
- Top goalscorer: Brito (8)
- Average home league attendance: 20,595
Home colours	Away colours	Third colours

2001 Yokohama F. Marinos season

== Competitions ==
Competitions	Position
J.League 1	13th / 16 clubs
Emperor's Cup	3rd round
J.League Cup	Champions

== Domestic results ==
=== J.League 1 ===
10 March 2001 1-1	Yokohama F. Marinos	0-1 (GG) (a.e.t.)	Vissel Kobe	International Stadium Yokohama
JST (UTC+09)

17 March 2001 1-2	Gamba Osaka	3-2	Yokohama F. Marinos	Osaka Expo '70 Stadium
JST (UTC+09)

31 March 2001 1-3	Nagoya Grampus Eight	1-1 (GG) (a.e.t.)	Yokohama F. Marinos	Mizuho Athletic Stadium
JST (UTC+09)

7 April 2001 1-4	Yokohama F. Marinos	0-1	Urawa Red Diamonds	International Stadium Yokohama
JST (UTC+09)

14 April 2001 1-5	JEF United Ichihara	2-0	Yokohama F. Marinos	Akita Yabase Stadium
JST (UTC+09)

29 April 2001 1-6	Yokohama F. Marinos	2-1	Sanfrecce Hiroshima	International Stadium Yokohama
JST (UTC+09)

3 May 2001 1-7	Tokyo Verdy 1969	2-3	Yokohama F. Marinos	Tokyo Stadium
JST (UTC+09)

6 May 2001 1-8	Yokohama F. Marinos	0-2	Kashiwa Reysol	International Stadium Yokohama
JST (UTC+09)

12 May 2001 1-9	Avispa Fukuoka	1-0 (GG) (a.e.t.)	Yokohama F. Marinos	Hakatanomori Football Stadium
JST (UTC+09)

19 May 2001 1-10	Cerezo Osaka	0-2	Yokohama F. Marinos	Osaka Nagai Stadium
JST (UTC+09)

16 June 2001 1-11	Yokohama F. Marinos	0-2	FC Tokyo	International Stadium Yokohama
JST (UTC+09)

23 June 2001 1-12	Kashima Antlers	2-0	Yokohama F. Marinos	Kashima Soccer Stadium
JST (UTC+09)

7 July 2001 1-13	Yokohama F. Marinos	1-2 (GG) (a.e.t.)	Júbilo Iwata	International Stadium Yokohama
JST (UTC+09)

14 July 2001 1-14	Yokohama F. Marinos	1-3	Shimizu S-Pulse	International Stadium Yokohama
JST (UTC+09)

21 July 2001 1-15	Consadole Sapporo	1-1 (GG) (a.e.t.)	Yokohama F. Marinos	Sapporo Dome
JST (UTC+09)

11 August 2001 2-1	Yokohama F. Marinos	1-0 (GG) (a.e.t.)	Avispa Fukuoka	International Stadium Yokohama
JST (UTC+09)

18 August 2001 2-2	Kashiwa Reysol	0-1	Yokohama F. Marinos	Kashiwanoha Park Stadium
JST (UTC+09)

25 August 2001 2-3	Yokohama F. Marinos	3-2 (GG) (a.e.t.)	Consadole Sapporo	International Stadium Yokohama
JST (UTC+09)

8 September 2001 2-4	Shimizu S-Pulse	3-0	Yokohama F. Marinos	Nihondaira Sports Stadium
JST (UTC+09)

15 September 2001 2-5	Yokohama F. Marinos	1-2	Tokyo Verdy 1969	Tokyo National Stadium
JST (UTC+09)

22 September 2001 2-6	Sanfrecce Hiroshima	3-1	Yokohama F. Marinos	Hiroshima Big Arch
JST (UTC+09)

29 September 2001 2-7	Yokohama F. Marinos	1-1 (GG) (a.e.t.)	JEF United Ichihara	International Stadium Yokohama
JST (UTC+09)

13 October 2001 2-8	Urawa Red Diamonds	0-2	Yokohama F. Marinos	Saitama Stadium 2002
JST (UTC+09)

17 October 2001 2-9	Yokohama F. Marinos	2-0	Nagoya Grampus Eight	International Stadium Yokohama
JST (UTC+09)

20 October 2001 2-10	Yokohama F. Marinos	2-3 (GG) (a.e.t.)	Cerezo Osaka	International Stadium Yokohama
JST (UTC+09)

31 October 2001 2-11	FC Tokyo	1-1 (GG) (a.e.t.)	Yokohama F. Marinos	Tokyo Stadium
JST (UTC+09)

3 November 2001 2-12	Yokohama F. Marinos	1-2 (GG) (a.e.t.)	Kashima Antlers	International Stadium Yokohama
JST (UTC+09)

10 November 2001 2-13	Júbilo Iwata	1-0 (GG) (a.e.t.)	Yokohama F. Marinos	Júbilo Iwata Stadium
JST (UTC+09)

17 November 2001 2-14	Yokohama F. Marinos	2-1	Gamba Osaka	Yokohama Mitsuzawa Stadium
JST (UTC+09)

24 November 2001 2-15	Vissel Kobe	1-1 (GG) (a.e.t.)	Yokohama F. Marinos	Kobe Wing Stadium
JST (UTC+09)

=== Emperor's Cup ===
1st Round	bye

2nd Round	bye

9 December 2001 3rd Round	Yokohama F. Marinos	0-1	Kyoto Purple Sanga	Yokohama Mitsuzawa Stadium
JST (UTC+09)

=== J.League Cup ===
4 April 2001 1st Round-1	Mito HollyHock	0-1	Yokohama F. Marinos	Tochigi Green Stadium
JST (UTC+09)

18 April 2001 1st Round-2	Yokohama F. Marinos	3-1 (4-1 agg.)	Mito HollyHock	Yokohama Mitsuzawa Stadium
JST (UTC+09)

13 June 2001 2nd Round-1	Avispa Fukuoka	0-3	Yokohama F. Marinos	Hakatanomori Football Stadium
JST (UTC+09)

20 June 2001 2nd Round-2	Yokohama F. Marinos	2-0 (5-0 agg.)	Avispa Fukuoka	Yokohama Mitsuzawa Stadium
JST (UTC+09)

8 August 2001 Quarterfinals-1	Yokohama F. Marinos	3-0	Kawasaki Frontale	Yokohama Mitsuzawa Stadium
JST (UTC+09)

29 August 2001 Quarterfinals-2	Kawasaki Frontale	0-2 (0-5 agg.)	Yokohama F. Marinos	Todoroki Athletics Stadium
JST (UTC+09)

26 September 2001 Semifinals-1	Nagoya Grampus Eight	0-1	Yokohama F. Marinos	Mizuho Athletic Stadium
JST (UTC+09)

10 October 2001 Semifinals-2	Yokohama F. Marinos	0-0 (1-0 agg.)	Nagoya Grampus Eight	Yokohama Mitsuzawa Stadium
JST (UTC+09)

27 October 2001 Final	Júbilo Iwata	0-0 (GG) (a.e.t.) (1-3 p)	Yokohama F. Marinos	Tokyo National Stadium
JST (UTC+09)		J.League

== Player statistics ==
No.	Pos.	Nat.	Player	D.o.B. (Age)	Height / Weight	J.League 1		Emperor's Cup		J.League Cup		Total	
No.	Pos.	Nat.	Player	D.o.B. (Age)	Height / Weight	Apps	Goals	Apps	Goals	Apps	Goals	Apps	Goals
1	GK	(Japan)	Yoshikatsu Kawaguchi	August 15, 1975 (aged 25)	cm / kg	25	0						
2	DF	(Japan)	Yoshiaki Maruyama	October 12, 1974 (aged 26)	cm / kg	5	0						
3	DF	(Japan)	Naoki Matsuda	March 14, 1977 (aged 23)	cm / kg	29	0						
4	DF	(Japan)	Yasuhiro Hato	May 4, 1976 (aged 24)	cm / kg	27	0						
5	DF	(Japan)	Norio Omura	September 6, 1969 (aged 31)	cm / kg	21	1						
6	MF	(Japan)	Yoshiharu Ueno	April 21, 1973 (aged 27)	cm / kg	25	4						
7	FW	(Uruguay)	Marcelo Lipatin	January 28, 1977 (aged 24)	cm / kg	1	0						
7	DF	(Brazil)	Naza	December 8, 1968 (aged 32)	cm / kg	11	1						
8	MF	(Japan)	Akihiro Endō	September 18, 1975 (aged 25)	cm / kg	30	1						
9	FW	(Brazil)	Leandro Simioni	September 29, 1974 (aged 26)	cm / kg	3	0						
9	FW	(Brazil)	Brito	August 4, 1977 (aged 23)	cm / kg	10	8						
10	MF	(Japan)	Shunsuke Nakamura	June 24, 1978 (aged 22)	cm / kg	24	3						
11	FW	(Japan)	Shoji Jo	June 17, 1975 (aged 25)	cm / kg	25	2						
12	MF	(Japan)	Shintaro Harada	November 8, 1980 (aged 20)	cm / kg	0	0						
13	MF	(Japan)	Kunio Nagayama	September 16, 1970 (aged 30)	cm / kg	20	1						
14	MF	(Japan)	Seiji Koga	August 7, 1979 (aged 21)	cm / kg	4	0						
15	MF	(Japan)	Tomokazu Hirama	June 30, 1977 (aged 23)	cm / kg	16	1						
16	GK	(Japan)	Tatsuya Enomoto	March 16, 1979 (aged 21)	cm / kg	5	0						
17	FW	(Japan)	Ryosuke Kijima	May 29, 1979 (aged 21)	cm / kg	20	0						
18	MF	(Japan)	Naohiro Ishikawa	May 12, 1981 (aged 19)	cm / kg	13	1						
19	MF	(Japan)	Daisuke Tonoike	January 29, 1975 (aged 26)	cm / kg	7	0						
19	FW	(Japan)	Sotaro Yasunaga	April 20, 1976 (aged 24)	cm / kg	6	0						
20	DF	(Japan)	Hayuma Tanaka	July 31, 1982 (aged 18)	cm / kg	16	0						
21	GK	(Japan)	Shinya Yoshihara	April 19, 1978 (aged 22)	cm / kg	0	0						
21	GK	(Japan)	Hiroshi Sato	March 7, 1972 (aged 29)	cm / kg	0	0						
22	MF	(Japan)	Yuki Kaneko	May 29, 1982 (aged 18)	cm / kg	8	0						
23	FW	(Japan)	Yutaka Tahara	April 27, 1982 (aged 18)	cm / kg	13	1						
24	MF	(Japan)	Takumi Motohashi	August 3, 1982 (aged 18)	cm / kg	0	0						
25	DF	(Japan)	Shogo Kobara	November 2, 1982 (aged 18)	cm / kg	5	0						
26	DF	(Japan)	Masahiro Kazuma	June 22, 1982 (aged 18)	cm / kg	10	1						
27	MF	(Japan)	Daisuke Goto	April 25, 1982 (aged 18)	cm / kg	0	0						
28	MF	(Japan)	Hirotaka Iida	April 29, 1982 (aged 18)	cm / kg	0	0						
29	FW	(Japan)	Daisuke Sakata	January 16, 1983 (aged 18)	cm / kg	11	2						
30	GK	(Japan)	Kenichi Shimokawa	May 14, 1970 (aged 30)	cm / kg	0	0						
32	DF	(Brazil)	Dutra	August 11, 1973 (aged 27)	cm / kg	12	3						
33	FW	(Japan)	Yoichi Mori	August 1, 1980 (aged 20)	cm / kg	0	0						
