= Nobuki Hara =

Japanese footballer

Nobuki Hara 原 信生
Personal information
- Full name: Nobuki Hara
- Date of birth: September 6, 1979 (age 47)
- Place of birth: Satsumasendai, Kagoshima, Japan
- Height: 1.74 m (5 ft 8 1/2 in)
- Position: Midfielder

Youth career
- 1995–1997: Reimei High School

Senior career*
Years	Team	Apps	(Gls)
1998–2003	Cerezo Osaka	41	(2)
2004–2005	Yokohama F. Marinos	4	(0)
2006	Vissel Kobe	4	(0)
2006	SC Tottori	5	(0)
Total		54	(2)
Medal record
Cerezo Osaka
Runner-up	Emperor's Cup	2001
Runner-up	Emperor's Cup	2003
Yokohama F. Marinos
Winner	J1 League	2004
- * Club domestic league appearances and goals

Nobuki Hara (原 信生, Hara Nobuki; born September 6, 1979) is a former Japanese football player.

== Playing career ==
Hara was born in Satsumasendai on September 6, 1979. After graduating from high school, he joined J1 League club Cerezo Osaka in 1998. He debuted in 2000 and the club won the 2nd place 2001 Emperor's Cup. However the club results were bad in league competition in 2001 and was relegated to J2 League from 2002. From 2002, he played many matches as defensive midfielder and side midfielder. The club returned to J1 in a year and won the 2nd place 2003 Emperor's Cup. In 2004, he moved to Yokohama F. Marinos. Although he played 2 seasons, he could hardly play in the match. In 2006, he moved to J2 club Vissel Kobe. However he could hardly play in the match. In October 2006, he moved to Japan Football League club SC Tottori. He retired end of 2006 season.

== Club statistics ==
Club performance			League		Cup		League Cup		Continental		Total	
Season	Club	League	Apps	Goals	Apps	Goals	Apps	Goals	Apps	Goals	Apps	Goals
Japan			League		Emperor's Cup		J.League Cup		Asia		Total	
1998	Cerezo Osaka	J1 League	0	0	0	0	0	0	-		0	0
1999	Cerezo Osaka	J1 League	0	0	0	0	0	0	-		0	0
2000	Cerezo Osaka	J1 League	5	1	1	0	0	0	-		6	1
2001	Cerezo Osaka	J1 League	4	0	3	2	0	0	-		7	2
2002	Cerezo Osaka	J2 League	18	1	3	1	-		-		21	2
2003	Cerezo Osaka	J1 League	14	0	2	0	1	0	-		17	0
2004	Yokohama F. Marinos	J1 League	1	0	0	0	1	0	2	0	4	0
2005	Yokohama F. Marinos	J1 League	3	0	0	0	0	0	1	0	4	0
2006	Vissel Kobe	J2 League	4	0	0	0	-		-		4	0
2006	SC Tottori	Football League	5	0	0	0	-		-		5	0
Career total			54	2	9	3	2	0	3	0	68	5
