= Yukihiro Yamase =

Japanese footballer (born 1984)

Yukihiro Yamase 山瀬 幸宏
Personal information
- Full name: Yukihiro Yamase
- Date of birth: April 22, 1984 (age 42)
- Place of birth: Sapporo, Japan
- Height: 1.76 m (5 ft 9 1/2 in)
- Position: Midfielder

Youth career
- 2000–2002: Yokohama F. Marinos

Senior career*
| Years | Team | Apps | (Gls) |
| 2003–2009 | Yokohama F. Marinos | 46 | (4) |
| 2009–2011 | Sagan Tosu | 52 | (4) |
| 2012–2013 | Kataller Toyama | 11 | (0) |
| 2014 | FC Osaka | 4 | (0) |
| Total | | 113 | (8) |
Medal record
Yokohama F. Marinos
| Winner | J1 League | 2003 |
| Winner | J1 League | 2004 |
- * Club domestic league appearances and goals

Yukihiro Yamase (山瀬 幸宏, Yamase Yukihiro; born April 22, 1984) is a former Japanese football player. His father Isao Yamase participated in the 1984 Winter Olympics as a biathlete. His elder brother Koji is also a footballer.

== Playing career ==
Yamase moved to Tosu in April 2009 on a loan contract from Yokohama F. Marinos. Yamase is a left-footed attacking player who can play as a central attacking midfielder, second striker or left attacker. He is known in Japan to have a very powerful left shot and has scored many goals from a distance.

== Career statistics ==
Appearances and goals by club, season and competition
| Club | Season | League | | | Emperor's Cup | | J.League Cup | | Asia | | Total | |
| Club | Season | Division | Apps | Goals | Apps | Goals | Apps | Goals | Apps | Goals | Apps | Goals |
|---|---|---|---|---|---|---|---|---|---|---|---|---|
| Yokohama F. Marinos | 2003 | J1 League | 0 | 0 | 0 | 0 | 0 | 0 | - | | 0 | 0 |
| Yokohama F. Marinos | 2004 | J1 League | 0 | 0 | 0 | 0 | 0 | 0 | 1 | 0 | 1 | 0 |
| Yokohama F. Marinos | 2005 | J1 League | 1 | 0 | 0 | 0 | 0 | 0 | 1 | 0 | 2 | 0 |
| Yokohama F. Marinos | 2006 | J1 League | 6 | 0 | 1 | 0 | 0 | 0 | - | | 7 | 0 |
| Yokohama F. Marinos | 2007 | J1 League | 30 | 4 | 1 | 0 | 8 | 1 | - | | 39 | 5 |
| Yokohama F. Marinos | 2008 | J1 League | 9 | 0 | 0 | 0 | 4 | 1 | - | | 13 | 1 |
| Yokohama F. Marinos | 2009 | J1 League | 0 | 0 | 0 | 0 | 0 | 0 | - | | 0 | 0 |
| Sagan Tosu | 2009 | J2 League | 24 | 2 | 3 | 2 | - | | - | | 27 | 4 |
| Sagan Tosu | 2010 | J2 League | | | | | - | | - | | | |
| Career total | | | 70 | 6 | 5 | 2 | 12 | 2 | 2 | 0 | 89 | 10 |

== J1 League Firsts ==
- Appearance: May 8, 2005. Yokohama F. Marinos 1 vs 0 Sanfrecce Hiroshima, Hiroshima Big Arch
- Goal: April 14, 2007. Yokohama F. Marinos 5 vs 0 Oita Trinita, Nissan Stadium
