= Kei Omoto =

Japanese footballer

Kei Omoto 尾本 敬
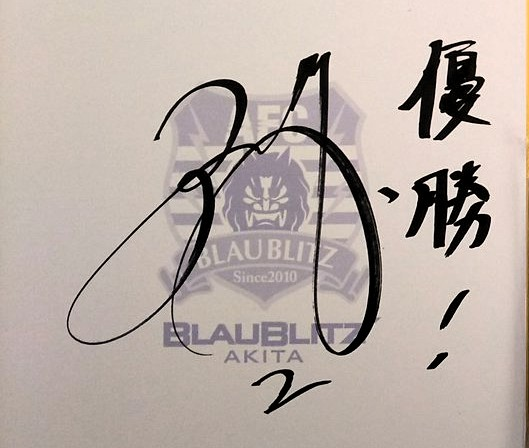

Personal information
- Full name: Kei Omoto
- Date of birth: July 21, 1984 (age 42)
- Place of birth: Chiba, Japan
- Height: 1.82 m (5 ft 11 1/2 in)
- Position: Defender

Youth career
- 2000–2002: Yachiyo High School

Senior career*
Years	Team	Apps	(Gls)
2003–2005	Yokohama F. Marinos	0	(0)
2006–2010	Thespa Kusatsu	97	(6)
2011–2014	Mito HollyHock	116	(4)
2015–2017	Tochigi SC	67	(4)
2018–2019	Blaublitz Akita	33	(1)
2020–2021	Ococias Kyoto AC	6	(0)
Total		319	(15)
Medal record
Yokohama F. Marinos
Winner	J1 League	2003
Winner	J1 League	2004
- * Club domestic league appearances and goals

Kei Omoto (尾本 敬, Omoto Kei; born July 21, 1984) is a Japanese former footballer player who played as a defender. He began his professional career at Yokohama F. Marinos in 2003. He went on to join Thespa Gunma in 2006, making 101 appearances, Mito HollyHock in 2011, making 124 appearances and Tochigi SC in 2015. He also joined Blaublitz Akita in 2018 and Ococias Kyoto AC in 2020. He retired at the end of the 2021 season, aged 37.

== Club statistics ==
Appearances and goals by club, season and competition
Club	Season	League			National cup (Note: Includes Emperor's Cup)		Other		Total	
Club	Season	Division	Apps	Goals	Apps	Goals	Apps	Goals	Apps	Goals
Yokohama F. Marinos	2003	J.League Division 1	0	0	0	0	0	0	0	0
Yokohama F. Marinos	2004	J.League Division 1	0	0	1	0	1 (Note: Appearance in AFC Champions League)	0	2	0
Yokohama F. Marinos	2005	J.League Division 1	0	0	0	0	0	0	0	0
Yokohama F. Marinos	Total		0	0	1	0	0	0	1	0
Thespa Kusatsu	2006	J.League Division 2	30	1	0	0	–		30	1
Thespa Kusatsu	2007	J.League Division 2	38	2	2	0	–		40	2
Thespa Kusatsu	2008	J.League Division 2	18	1	2	0	–		20	1
Thespa Kusatsu	2009	J.League Division 2	0	0	0	0	–		0	0
Thespa Kusatsu	2010	J.League Division 2	11	2	0	0	–		11	2
Thespa Kusatsu	Total		97	6	4	0	0	0	101	6
Mito HollyHock	2011	J.League Division 2	32	1	3	0	–		35	1
Mito HollyHock	2012	J.League Division 2	30	0	2	0	–		32	0
Mito HollyHock	2013	J.League Division 2	29	2	1	0	–		30	2
Mito HollyHock	2014	J.League Division 2	25	1	2	0	–		27	1
Mito HollyHock	Total		116	4	8	0	0	0	124	4
Tochigi SC	2015	J2 League	13	1	0	0	0	0	13	1
Tochigi SC	2016	J3 League	30	1	0	0	2 (Note: Appearance in J2/J3 play-offs)	0	32	1
Tochigi SC	2017	J3 League	24	2	0	0	0	0	24	2
Tochigi SC	Total		67	4	0	0	2	0	69	4
Blaublitz Akita	2018	J3 League	24	1	1	0	–		25	1
Blaublitz Akita	2019	J3 League	9	0	0	0	–		9	0
Blaublitz Akita	Total		33	1	1	0	0	0	34	1
Ococias Kyoto	2020	KSL Division 1	4	0	1	0	0	0	5	0
Ococias Kyoto	2021	KSL Division 1	2	0	3	0	4 (Note: Appearance in Japanese Regional Football Champions League)	1	9	1
Ococias Kyoto	Total		6	0	4	0	4	1	14	1
Career total			319	15	18	0	7	1	344	16
