= Edmilson Alves =

Brazilian footballer (born 1976)

Personal information
- Full name: Edmilson Alves
- Date of birth: February 17, 1976 (age 50)
- Place of birth: Brazil
- Height: 1.82 m (6 ft 0 in)
- Position: Midfielder

Senior career*
Years	Team	Apps	(Gls)
1997	CA Juventus		
1998–1999	EC Uniao Suzano		
2000	Nacional		
2001	Londrina		
2001	Ubirantan		
2002	Fortaleza		
2002–2003	Ulsan Hyundai Horang-i	41	(4)
2003	Oita Trinita	5	(0)
2004	Fortaleza	4	(0)
2005	Londrina	20	(2)
2005–2006	Oita Trinita	46	(4)
2007	Londrina		
2007	Ceará	7	(0)
2007–2009	Oita Trinita	76	(7)
2010	Vissel Kobe	23	(0)
2011	Roasso Kumamoto	28	(1)
2012	Arapongas	1	(0)
- * Club domestic league appearances and goals as of 29 January 2011

Edmilson Alves (born February 17, 1976), is a Brazilian midfielder.

== Club statistics ==
Club performance			League		Cup		League Cup		Total	
Season	Club	League	Apps	Goals	Apps	Goals	Apps	Goals	Apps	Goals
Japan			League		Emperor's Cup		J.League Cup		Total	
2003	Oita Trinita	J1 League	5	0	1	0	0	0	6	0
Brazil			League		Copa do Brasil		League Cup		Total	
2004	Fortaleza	Série B	4	0					4	0
2005	Londrina	Série C	20	2					20	2
Japan			League		Emperor's Cup		J.League Cup		Total	
2005	Oita Trinita	J1 League	16	1	2	0	0	0	18	1
2006	Oita Trinita	J1 League	30	3	2	0	4	0	36	3
Brazil			League		Copa do Brasil		League Cup		Total	
2007	Londrina		0	0					0	0
2007	Ceará	Série B	7	0					7	0
Japan			League		Emperor's Cup		J.League Cup		Total	
2007	Oita Trinita	J1 League	16	1	2	0	0	0	18	1
2008	Oita Trinita	J1 League	33	4	0	0	8	2	41	6
2009	Oita Trinita	J1 League	27	2	1	0	2	1	30	3
2010	Vissel Kobe	J1 League								
Country	Japan		127	11	8	0	14	3	149	14
Country	Brazil		31	2					31	2
Total			158	13	8	0	14	3	180	16
