= Rodrigo Gral =

Brazilian footballer

Personal information
- Full name: Rodrigo Gral
- Date of birth: 21 February 1977 (age 49)
- Place of birth: Chapecó, Brazil
- Height: 1.76 m (5 ft 9 1/2 in)
- Position: Striker

Senior career*
Years	Team	Apps	(Gls)
1995–2001	Grêmio	49	(4)
1998	→ Juventude (loan)	10	(4)
2000–2001	→ Flamengo (loan)	3	(0)
2001	Sport Club	32	(16)
2002–2005	Júbilo Iwata	69	(38)
2005	Yokohama F. Marinos	17	(5)
2006	Omiya Ardija	11	(5)
2006–2008	Al-Khor	43	(22)
2009	Al-Sadd	2	(0)
2010	Bahia	22	(8)
2011	Santa Cruz	7	(1)
2012	Brunei DPMM	11	(4)
2012	Hercílio Luz		
2012–2014	Chapecoense	7	(2)
2014	Juventus-SC	?	(10)
2015	Gama		
2015	Concórdia		
2016	Operário MS	2	(2)
2016	FC Djursland	3	(5)
2017	Igrejinha		
- * Club domestic league appearances and goals

Rodrigo Gral (born 21 February 1977) is a Brazilian former professional footballer.

== Career ==
Gral has played in Japan and made his J1 League debut for Júbilo Iwata against Consadole Sapporo on 17 March 2002, and marked the occasion in front of the home crowd at Yamaha Stadium by scoring a goal. He has been one of the most prolific goalscorers in the J1 League since he came to Japan in 2002, having scored at a rate of more than a goal every two games.

Before joining Júbilo Iwata, Gral previously played in his native Brazil for Grêmio, Juventude, Flamengo, and Sport Recife.

He also utilized Roberto Assis as his agent for a period of time.

Gral has represented Brazil in the 1999 FIFA World Youth Championship. He scored once in the finals, against Zambia.

== Honours ==
J - League: 2002

Emperor's Cup: 2003

Japanese Super Cup: 2003, 2004
