= 2004 J.League Division 1 =

12th season of J1 League

J.League Division 1
- Season: 2004
- Champions: Yokohama F. Marinos; 3rd J.League title 5th Japanese title
- AFC Champions League: Yokohama F. Marinos; Júbilo Iwata
- Matches: 240
- Goals: 744 (3.1 per match)
- Top goalscorer: Emerson Sheik (27 goals)
- Highest attendance: 58,334 (Round 24, Reds vs. Marinos)
- Lowest attendance: 4,429 (Round 5, Gamba vs. JEF Utd.)
- Average attendance: 18,965

The 2004 J.League Division 1 season was the 12th season of the J.League Division 1. The league fixture began on March 13 and ended on December 12. The Suntory Championship took place on December 5 and 11, followed by the first ever J. League promotion/relegation series on December 4 and 12.

== General ==
=== Promotion and relegation ===
- At the end of the 2003 season, Albirex Niigata and Sanfrecce Hiroshima were promoted to J1.
- At the end of the 2003 season, Vegalta Sendai and Kyoto Purple Sanga were relegated to J2.

=== Changes in competition formats ===
- This was the last J.League Division 1 season to be competed in two stages (or two halves).
- This was also the last J.League Division 1 season with 16 clubs. Next season, the division was expanded to 18 clubs.

=== Changes in clubs ===
none

== Clubs ==
Location of the clubs in Japan

The following sixteen clubs participated in J.League Division 1 during 2004 season. Of these clubs, Albirex Niigata and Sanfrecce Hiroshima were newly promoted from Division 2.

- Albirex Niigata
- Cerezo Osaka
- FC Tokyo
- Gamba Osaka
- JEF United Ichihara
- Júbilo Iwata
- Kashima Antlers
- Kashiwa Reysol
- Nagoya Grampus Eight
- Oita Trinita
- Sanfrecce Hiroshima
- Shimizu S-Pulse
- Tokyo Verdy 1969
- Urawa Red Diamonds
- Vissel Kobe
- Yokohama F. Marinos

=== Personnel ===
Club	Head coach
Albirex Niigata	(Japan) Yasuharu Sorimachi
Cerezo Osaka	(Japan) Shinji Kobayashi
FC Tokyo	(Japan) Hiromi Hara
Gamba Osaka	(Japan) Akira Nishino
JEF United Ichihara	(Bosnia and Herzegovina) Ivica Osim
Júbilo Iwata	(Japan) Masakazu Suzuki
Kashima Antlers	(Brazil) Toninho Cerezo
Kashiwa Reysol	(Japan) Hiroshi Hayano
Nagoya Grampus Eight	(Brazil) Nelsinho Baptista
Oita Trinita	(Netherlands) Han Berger
Sanfrecce Hiroshima	(Japan) Takeshi Ono
Shimizu S-Pulse	(Japan) Nobuhiro Ishizaki
Tokyo Verdy 1969	(Argentina) Osvaldo Ardiles
Urawa Red Diamonds	(Germany) Guido Buchwald
Vissel Kobe	(Japan) Hiroshi Kato
Yokohama F. Marinos	(Japan) Takeshi Okada

=== Foreign players ===
Club	Player 1	Player 2	Player 3	Non-visa foreign	Type-C contract	Former players
Albirex Niigata	(Brazil) Edmílson	(Brazil) Fabinho Santos	(Brazil) Oséas	(North Korea) An Yong-hak	(Brazil) Roberto César	(Brazil) Anderson Batatais
Cerezo Osaka	(Croatia) Mario Garba	(Serbia and Montenegro) Miodrag Anđelković	(Slovenia) Davorin Kablar			(Bosnia and Herzegovina) Ivan Radeljić (Croatia) Krunoslav Lovrek
FC Tokyo	(Brazil) Jean	(Brazil) Kelly	(Brazil) Lucas Severino		(South Korea) Oh Jang-eun	
Gamba Osaka	(Brazil) Fernandinho	(Brazil) Magrão	(Brazil) Sidiclei			
JEF United Ichihara	(Brazil) Marquinhos	(Brazil) Sandro	(Slovenia) Željko Milinovič	(South Korea) Kim Dong-soo		
Júbilo Iwata	(Brazil) Gavião	(Brazil) Rodrigo Gral				
Kashima Antlers	(Brazil) Baron	(Brazil) Fábio Júnior	(Brazil) Fernando			
Kashiwa Reysol	(Brazil) Ricardinho	(Brazil) Zé Roberto	(Colombia) Ever Palacios			(Brazil) Dudu Cearense
Nagoya Grampus Eight	(Brazil) Claiton	(Brazil) Marques	(Brazil) Ueslei	(South Korea) Chong Yong-de	(Brazil) Jorginho	(Croatia) Andrej Panadić
Oita Trinita	(Brazil) Magno Alves	(Netherlands) Patrick Zwaanswijk		(Brazil) Sandro		(Netherlands) Richard Witschge
Sanfrecce Hiroshima	(Brazil) Beto	(Brazil) Ricardo	(Brazil) Tiago	(North Korea) Ri Han-jae		(Brazil) César Sampaio
Shimizu S-Pulse	(Brazil) Clemerson	(South Korea) Cho Jae-jin				(Brazil) Fabinho (Brazil) Paulo Jamelli
Tokyo Verdy 1969	(Argentina) Claudio Úbeda	(Brazil) Hugo			(South Korea) Lee Woo-jin	(Cameroon) Patrick Mboma
Urawa Red Diamonds	(Brazil) Emerson Sheik	(Brazil) Nenê	(Turkey) Alpay Özalan			(Russia) Yuriy Nikiforov
Vissel Kobe	(Brazil) Roger Machado	(Cameroon) Patrick Mboma	(Czech Republic) Pavel Horváth	(South Korea) Park Kang-jo	(Brazil) Leandrão	(Turkey) İlhan Mansız
Yokohama F. Marinos	(Brazil) Dutra	(South Korea) Ahn Jung-hwan	(South Korea) Yoo Sang-chul			

== Format ==
In the 2004 season, the league was conducted split-season format, 1st Stage and 2nd Stage. In each stage, sixteen clubs played in a single round-robin format, a total of 15 games per club (per stage). A club received 3 points for a win, 1 point for a tie, and 0 points for a loss. The club were ranked by points, and tie breakers are, in the following order:

- Goal differential
- Goals scored
- Head-to-head results

A draw would be conducted, if necessary. The club that finished at the top of the table is declared stage champion and qualifies for the Suntory Championship. The first stage winner, hosts the first leg in the championship series. If a single club wins both stages, the club is declared the season champions and championship series will not be held. Meanwhile, the last-placed (16th-placed) club must play Pro/Rele Series at the end of the season.

Changes in competition format

- No direct relegation this year, due to expansion of Division 1 in the following season
- Last-placed (16th placed) club plays Pro/Rele Series at the end of the season

== First stage ==
=== Table ===
Pos	Team	Pld	W	D	L	GF	GA	GD	Pts	Qualification
1	Yokohama F. Marinos (A)	15	11	3	1	26	13	+13	36	Qualification for Suntory Championship
2	Júbilo Iwata	15	11	1	3	31	16	+15	34	
3	Urawa Red Diamonds	15	7	4	4	30	24	+6	25	
4	Gamba Osaka	15	7	3	5	31	23	+8	24	
5	Kashima Antlers	15	7	3	5	18	14	+4	24	
6	FC Tokyo	15	6	5	4	19	19	0	23	
7	JEF United Ichihara	15	5	7	3	28	23	+5	22	
8	Nagoya Grampus Eight	15	5	5	5	24	22	+2	20	
9	Tokyo Verdy 1969	15	5	4	6	21	23	−2	19	
10	Oita Trinita	15	5	2	8	21	27	−6	17	
11	Shimizu S-Pulse	15	3	7	5	20	27	−7	16	
12	Vissel Kobe	15	3	6	6	21	25	−4	15	
13	Sanfrecce Hiroshima	15	3	6	6	15	19	−4	15	
14	Albirex Niigata	15	3	5	7	16	25	−9	14	
15	Kashiwa Reysol	15	3	3	9	14	22	−8	12	
16	Cerezo Osaka	15	2	4	9	17	30	−13	10	

Updated to match(es) played on June 26, 2004. Source: J. League Division 1
Rules for classification: 1) points; 2) goal difference; 3) number of goals scored.
(A) Advance to a further round

=== Results ===
Home \ Away	ALB	ANT	CER	GAM	GRA	JEF	JÚB	REY	SFR	SSP	TOK	TRI	RED	VER	VIS	FMA
Albirex Niigata				1–4			1–2			3–3			0–3	0–1	0–0	1–3
Kashima Antlers	2–2			1–1	3–2		1–0				0–0	3–0			2–0	
Cerezo Osaka	1–2	1–0		0–1	1–2		1–2	1–5	1–2					2–2		
Gamba Osaka					0–2	2–2	0–2		1–0	4–0			3–2		6–3	
Nagoya Grampus Eight	1–1						1–3	1–0		2–2		2–1	3–0	1–2	2–2	
JEF United Ichihara	2–1	2–1	1–1		1–1			1–1		1–1	2–2					3–0
Júbilo Iwata						3–2			4–2		2–0	2–1	3–1	2–0	2–2	1–2
Kashiwa Reysol	1–2	0–1		0–2			1–3			0–0		2–1				1–2
Sanfrecce Hiroshima	1–1	0–2			1–1	1–3		3–0		1–1			0–0		2–0	
Shimizu S-Pulse		1–2	1–2				1–0				0–0	1–2	4–3	3–1		
FC Tokyo	1–0		1–1	2–1	3–2			2–1	1–1					3–2		0–2
Oita Trinita	0–1		3–0	4–3		2–3			2–1		2–1					1–1
Urawa Red Diamonds		1–0	4–2			3–3		1–1			2–1	4–1			2–1	
Tokyo Verdy 1969		3–0		2–2		2–1		0–1	0–0			3–1	1–3			
Vissel Kobe			2–2			2–1		2–0		5–1	1–2	0–0		1–1		0–2
Yokohama F. Marinos		1–0	2–1	2–1	2–1				2–0	1–1			1–1	3–1		

Updated to match(es) played on June 26, 2004. Source: J. League Division 1
Legend: Blue = home team win; Yellow = draw; Red = away team win.

== Second stage ==
=== Table ===
Pos	Team	Pld	W	D	L	GF	GA	GD	Pts	Qualification
1	Urawa Red Diamonds (A)	15	12	1	2	40	15	+25	37	Qualification for Suntory Championship
2	JEF United Ichihara	15	8	4	3	27	22	+5	28	
3	Gamba Osaka	15	8	3	4	28	25	+3	27	
4	Kashima Antlers	15	7	3	5	23	17	+6	24	
5	Nagoya Grampus Eight	15	7	3	5	25	21	+4	24	
6	Yokohama F. Marinos	15	6	5	4	21	17	+4	23	
7	Albirex Niigata	15	7	2	6	31	33	−2	23	
8	Vissel Kobe	15	6	3	6	29	30	−1	21	
9	Tokyo Verdy 1969	15	6	2	7	22	23	−1	20	
10	FC Tokyo	15	4	6	5	21	22	−1	18	
11	Sanfrecce Hiroshima	15	3	7	5	21	23	−2	16	
12	Cerezo Osaka	15	4	4	7	25	34	−9	16	
13	Júbilo Iwata	15	3	5	7	23	28	−5	14	
14	Shimizu S-Pulse	15	4	1	10	17	26	−9	13	
15	Kashiwa Reysol	15	2	7	6	15	27	−12	13	
16	Oita Trinita	15	3	4	8	14	29	−15	13	

Updated to match(es) played on November 28, 2004. Source: J. League Division 1
Rules for classification: 1) points; 2) goal difference; 3) number of goals scored.
(A) Advance to a further round

=== Results ===
Home \ Away	ALB	ANT	CER	GAM	GRA	JEF	JÚB	REY	SFR	SSP	TOK	TRI	RED	VER	VIS	FMA
Albirex Niigata		1–0	1–2		0–0	3–3		1–3	3–2		4–2	3–0				
Kashima Antlers			4–3			0–1		1–0	0–0	0–0			2–3	1–0		3–1
Cerezo Osaka						3–0				2–1	4–3	1–2	0–2		1–2	1–1
Gamba Osaka	6–3	2–1	7–1					5–1			1–2	3–1		1–3		0–2
Nagoya Grampus Eight		0–2	5–2	1–2		0–2			2–1		1–1					2–1
JEF United Ichihara				2–2			2–1		2–1			2–0	0–4	2–1	5–1	
Júbilo Iwata	3–1	4–4	2–2	1–2	1–2			1–1		1–2						
Kashiwa Reysol			1–1		2–2	0–0			2–2		1–1		0–4	0–2	0–3	
Sanfrecce Hiroshima			2–1	2–2			3–2				1–1	0–0		3–0		2–2
Shimizu S-Pulse	2–4			0–1	1–2	1–2		2–1	3–0						1–3	1–2
FC Tokyo		0–1				3–3	0–0			1–2		1–1	1–0		3–1	
Oita Trinita		0–3			0–4		1–1	2–2		1–0			1–4	2–3	2–0	
Urawa Red Diamonds	4–1			2–1	1–2		3–2		1–0	2–1				7–2		0–0
Tokyo Verdy 1969	2–0		1–1		3–1		1–2			4–0	0–1				0–2	0–0
Vissel Kobe	3–4	2–1		3–3	2–1		1–2		2–2				2–3			
Yokohama F. Marinos	1–2					2–1	3–0	0–1			2–1	2–1			2–2	

Updated to match(es) played on November 28, 2004. Source: J. League Division 1
Legend: Blue = home team win; Yellow = draw; Red = away team win.

== Suntory Championship ==
Yokohama F. Marinos won the first stage and thus hosted the first game. They won the first leg by 1–0 thanks to Ryuji Kawai's goal. In the second leg, Alessandro Santos scored from the free kick in 76th minute to level the aggregate score. The clubs played in sudden death extra time, however neither club could break the scoreline. Yokohama upset the home club in the penalties winning them and series overall.

December 5, 2004
19:05

Yokohama F. Marinos	1 – 0	Urawa Red Diamonds
Kawai 66'	Report

International Stadium, Yokohama
Attendance: 64,899
Referee: Masayoshi Okada

December 11, 2004
19:37

Urawa Red Diamonds	1 – 0 (a.e.t.)	Yokohama F. Marinos
Alex 76'	Report
Penalties
Tulio (penalty missed); Alex (penalty scored); Nenê (penalty scored); Hasebe (penalty missed)	2 – 4	Oku (penalty scored); Ueno (penalty scored); Sakata (penalty scored); Dutra (penalty scored)

Saitama Stadium 2002, Saitama
Attendance: 59,715
Referee: Toru Kamikawa

=== Overall table ===
Pos	Team	Pld	W	D	L	GF	GA	GD	Pts	Qualification
1	Yokohama F. Marinos (C)	30	17	8	5	47	30	+17	59	Qualification for AFC Champions League 2005 group stage
2	Urawa Red Diamonds	30	19	5	6	70	39	+31	62	
3	Gamba Osaka	30	15	6	9	69	48	+21	51	
4	JEF United Ichihara	30	13	11	6	55	45	+10	50	
5	Júbilo Iwata	30	14	6	10	54	44	+10	48	Qualification for AFC Champions League 2005 group stage (Note: Júbilo Iwata qualified to 2005 ACL as 2003 Emperor's Cup winners.)
6	Kashima Antlers	30	14	6	10	41	31	+10	48	
7	Nagoya Grampus Eight	29	12	8	9	49	43	+6	44	
8	FC Tokyo	30	10	11	9	40	41	−1	41	
9	Tokyo Verdy 1969	30	11	6	13	43	46	−3	39	
10	Albirex Niigata	30	10	7	13	47	58	−11	37	
11	Vissel Kobe	30	9	9	12	50	55	−5	36	
12	Sanfrecce Hiroshima	30	6	13	11	36	42	−6	31	
13	Oita Trinita	30	8	6	16	35	56	−21	30	
14	Shimizu S-Pulse	30	7	8	15	37	53	−16	29	
15	Cerezo Osaka	30	6	8	16	42	64	−22	26	
16	Kashiwa Reysol (O)	30	5	10	15	29	49	−20	25	2004 promotion/relegation Series

Updated to match(es) played on November 28, 2004. Source: J. League Division 1 first stage, J. League Division 1 second stage
Rules for classification: 1) points; 2) goal difference; 3) number of goals scored.
(C) Champions; (O) Play-off winners

== Top scorers ==
Rank	Scorer	Club	Goals
1	(Brazil) Emerson Sheik	Urawa Red Diamonds	27
2	(Japan) Masashi Oguro	Gamba Osaka	20
3	(Brazil) Marques	Nagoya Grampus Eight	17
3	(Japan) Ryūji Bando	Vissel Kobe	17
5	(Brazil) Rodrigo Gral	Júbilo Iwata	16
6	(Brazil) Edmílson	Albirex Niigata	15
6	(Japan) Yoshito Ōkubo	Cerezo Osaka	15
8	(Brazil) Marquinhos	JEF United Ichihara	12
8	(South Korea) Ahn Jung-hwan	Yokohama F. Marinos	12
10	(Brazil) Lucas Severino	FC Tokyo	11
10	(Brazil) Magno Alves	Oita Trinita	11

== Attendance figures ==
Pos	Team	Total	High	Low	Average	Change
1	Albirex Niigata	565,336	41,955	11,150	37,689	+24.2%^{†}
2	Urawa Red Diamonds	549,903	58,334	18,029	36,660	+27.0%
3	FC Tokyo	381,575	41,469	16,349	25,438	+2.0%
4	Yokohama F. Marinos	372,273	52,961	13,554	24,818	−0.6%
5	Oita Trinita	328,336	29,435	14,871	21,889	+2.4%
6	Kashima Antlers	263,777	31,965	8,474	17,585	−17.1%
7	Júbilo Iwata	256,889	29,842	11,505	17,126	−0.8%
8	Vissel Kobe	236,031	29,835	10,035	15,735	+40.6%
9	Nagoya Grampus Eight	235,686	32,406	7,719	15,712	−6.3%
10	Tokyo Verdyb1969	225,878	35,556	7,372	15,059	−14.3%
11	Sanfrecce Hiroshima	222,005	29,332	5,251	14,800	+64.4%^{†}
12	Cerezo Osaka	214,844	22,778	7,010	14,323	+3.4%
13	Shimizu S-Pulse	203,521	39,120	8,230	13,568	−16.7%
14	Gamba Osaka	187,752	18,011	4,429	12,517	+22.5%
15	Kashiwa Reysol	157,702	21,711	7,049	10,513	−3.3%
16	JEF United Ichihara	150,187	34,793	5,093	10,012	+3.1%
	League total	4,551,695	58,334	4,429	18,965	+9.3%

Updated to games played on November 28, 2004
Source: J.League Division 1: first stage, second stage
Notes:
^{†} Team played previous season in J2.

== Awards ==
=== Individual ===
Award	Recipient	Club
Player of the Year	(Japan) Yuji Nakazawa	Yokohama F. Marinos
Young Player of the Year	(Japan) Takayuki Morimoto	Tokyo Verdy 1969
Manager of the Year	(Japan) Takeshi Okada	Yokohama F. Marinos
Top Scorer	(Brazil) Emerson Sheik	Urawa Red Diamonds

=== Best Eleven ===
Position	Footballer	Club	Nationality
GK	Yoichi Doi (1)	FC Tokyo	Japan
DF	Dutra (2)	Yokohama F. Marinos	Brazil
DF	Marcus Tulio Tanaka (1)	Urawa Red Diamonds	Japan
DF	Yuji Nakazawa (3)	Yokohama F. Marinos	Japan
MF	Daisuke Oku (3)	Yokohama F. Marinos	Japan
MF	Makoto Hasebe (1)	Urawa Red Diamonds	Japan
MF	Mitsuo Ogasawara (4)	Kashima Antlers	Japan
MF	Yasuhito Endō (2)	Gamba Osaka	Japan
FW	Emerson Sheik (3)	Urawa Red Diamonds	Brazil
FW	Marques (1)	Nagoya Grampus Eight	Brazil
FW	Masashi Oguro (1)	Gamba Osaka	Japan

* The number in brackets denotes the number of times that the footballer has appeared in the Best 11.
