= 2003 J.League Division 1 =

11th season of J1 League

J.League Division 1
- Season: 2003
- Champions: Yokohama F. Marinos; 2nd J.League title 4th Japanese title
- Relegated: Vegalta Sendai; Kyoto Purple Sanga
- AFC Champions League: Yokohama F. Marinos; Júbilo Iwata
- Matches: 240
- Goals: 718 (2.99 per match)
- Top goalscorer: Ueslei (22 goals)
- Highest attendance: 59,728 (Round 15, Marinos vs. Vissel)
- Lowest attendance: 3,452 (Round 3, JEF Utd. vs. Vissel)
- Average attendance: 17,351

The 2003 J.League Division 1 season was the 11th season since the establishment of the J.League Division 1. The league began on March 15 and ended on November 29.

== General ==
=== Promotion and relegation ===
- At the end of the 2002 season, Oita Trinita and Cerezo Osaka were promoted to division 1.
- At the end of the 2002 season, Sanfrecce Hiroshima and Consadole Sapporo were relegated to division 2.

=== Changes in competition formats ===
- Extra time was scratched for Division 1. After regulation time, clubs now receives 3pts for a win, 1pt for a tie, and 0pts for a loss.

=== Changes in clubs ===
none

== Honours ==
Competition	Champion	Runner-up	3rd place
J.League Division 1	Yokohama F. Marinos	Júbilo Iwata	JEF United Ichihara
J.League Division 2	Albirex Niigata	Sanfrecce Hiroshima	Kawasaki Frontale
Emperor's Cup	Júbilo Iwata	Cerezo Osaka	Kashima Antlers; Shimizu S-Pulse
Nabisco Cup	Urawa Red Diamonds	Kashima Antlers	Júbilo Iwata; Shimizu S-Pulse
XEROX Super Cup	Júbilo Iwata	Kyoto Purple Sanga	

== Clubs ==
Location of the clubs in Japan

The following were sixteen clubs participated in J.League Division 1 during 2003 season. Of these clubs, Oita Trinita and Cerezo Osaka were newly promoted from Division 2.

- Cerezo Osaka
- FC Tokyo
- Gamba Osaka
- JEF United Ichihara
- Júbilo Iwata
- Kashima Antlers
- Kashiwa Reysol
- Kyoto Purple Sanga
- Nagoya Grampus Eight
- Oita Trinita
- Shimizu S-Pulse
- Tokyo Verdy 1969
- Urawa Red Diamonds
- Vegalta Sendai
- Vissel Kobe
- Yokohama F. Marinos

=== Personnel ===
Club	Head coach
Cerezo Osaka	(Japan) Yuji Tsukada
FC Tokyo	(Japan) Hiromi Hara
Gamba Osaka	(Japan) Akira Nishino
JEF United Ichihara	(Bosnia and Herzegovina) Ivica Osim
Júbilo Iwata	(Japan) Masaaki Yanagishita
Kashima Antlers	(Brazil) Toninho Cerezo
Kashiwa Reysol	(Brazil) Marco Aurélio
Kyoto Purple Sanga	(Netherlands) Pim Verbeek
Nagoya Grampus Eight	(Brazil) Nelsinho Baptista
Oita Trinita	(Japan) Shinji Kobayashi
Shimizu S-Pulse	(Japan) Takeshi Oki
Tokyo Verdy 1969	(Argentina) Osvaldo Ardiles
Urawa Red Diamonds	(Netherlands) Hans Ooft
Vegalta Sendai	(Slovenia) Zdenko Verdenik
Vissel Kobe	(Japan) Hiroshi Soejima
Yokohama F. Marinos	(Japan) Takeshi Okada

=== Foreign players ===
Club	Player 1	Player 2	Player 3	Non-visa foreign	Type-C contract	Former players
Cerezo Osaka	(Brazil) Axel	(Brazil) Baron	(Brazil) João Carlos			(Bosnia and Herzegovina) Albin Pelak
FC Tokyo	(Brazil) Amaral	(Brazil) Jean	(Brazil) Kelly		(South Korea) Oh Jang-eun	
Gamba Osaka	(Brazil) Harison	(Brazil) Magrão	(Paraguay) Francisco Arce			(Brazil) Galeano (Cameroon) Patrick Mboma
JEF United Ichihara	(Brazil) Sandro	(Slovenia) Željko Milinovič	(South Korea) Choi Yong-soo	(North Korea) Kim Wi-man		
Júbilo Iwata	(Brazil) Rodrigo Gral	(Netherlands) Arno van Zwam				(Serbia and Montenegro) Aleksandar Živković
Kashima Antlers	(Brazil) Euller	(Brazil) Fernando				(Brazil) Claudecir (Brazil) Sandro da Silva
Kashiwa Reysol	(Brazil) Jussiê	(Brazil) Ricardinho			(Brazil) Robert	(Brazil) Márcio Nobre
Kyoto Purple Sanga	(Brazil) Biju	(Netherlands) Regillio Simons	(South Korea) Ko Jong-soo		(South Korea) Lim You-hwan	
Nagoya Grampus Eight	(Brazil) Marques	(Brazil) Ueslei	(Croatia) Andrej Panadić	(South Korea) Chong Yong-de		(Austria) Ivica Vastić
Oita Trinita	(Brazil) Edmilson Alves	(Brazil) Róbson	(Brazil) Will	(Brazil) Sandro	(South Korea) Kim Dong-hyun	(Brazil) Andradina (Brazil) Rodrigo Mendes
Shimizu S-Pulse	(Brazil) Émerson	(Brazil) Tuto	(South Korea) Ahn Jung-hwan			
Tokyo Verdy 1969	(Brazil) Alexandre Lopes	(Brazil) Ramon Menezes	(Cameroon) Patrick Mboma			
Urawa Red Diamonds	(Australia) Ned Zelic	(Brazil) Emerson Sheik	(Russia) Yuriy Nikiforov			(Brazil) Edmundo
Vegalta Sendai	(Brazil) Fabiano	(Brazil) Silvinho	(South Korea) Kim Eun-jung			(Brazil) Éder Ceccon (Brazil) Marcos
Vissel Kobe	(Brazil) Bismarck	(Brazil) Oséas	(Brazil) Sidiclei	(South Korea) Park Kang-jo		(Brazil) Harison
Yokohama F. Marinos	(Brazil) Dutra	(Brazil) Marquinhos	(South Korea) Yoo Sang-chul			

== Format ==
In the 2003 season, the league was conducted split-season format, 1st Stage and 2nd Stage. In each stage, sixteen clubs played in a single round-robin format, a total of 15 games per club (per stage). A club received 3 points for a win, 1 point for a tie, and 0 points for a loss. The clubs were ranked by points, and tie breakers are, in the following order:

- Goal differential
- Goals scored
- Head-to-head results

A draw would be conducted, if necessary. The club that finished at the top of the table is declared stage champion and qualifies for the Suntory Championship. The first stage winner, hosts the first leg in the championship series. If a single club wins both stages, the club is declared the season champions and championship series will not be held. Two bottom-placed clubs are relegated to J2.

Changes in Competition Format

- Extra time was abandoned, now every regular season game ends after 90 minutes.

== First stage ==
=== Table ===
Pos	Team	Pld	W	D	L	GF	GA	GD	Pts	Qualification
1	Yokohama F. Marinos (A)	15	10	2	3	29	16	+13	32	Qualification for Suntory Championship
2	Júbilo Iwata	15	9	4	2	34	17	+17	31	
3	JEF United Ichihara	15	8	3	4	33	20	+13	27	
4	FC Tokyo	15	7	4	4	14	11	+3	25	
5	Cerezo Osaka	15	8	1	6	29	29	0	25	
6	Urawa Red Diamonds	15	7	3	5	25	23	+2	24	
7	Nagoya Grampus Eight	15	5	8	2	19	16	+3	23	
8	Kashima Antlers	15	7	2	6	23	21	+2	23	
9	Kashiwa Reysol	15	6	3	6	19	19	0	21	
10	Tokyo Verdy 1969	15	6	1	8	28	32	−4	19	
11	Shimizu S-Pulse	15	5	3	7	20	18	+2	18	
12	Gamba Osaka	15	4	4	7	26	29	−3	16	
13	Vissel Kobe	15	5	1	9	18	34	−16	16	
14	Oita Trinita	15	4	3	8	20	21	−1	15	
15	Vegalta Sendai	15	3	3	9	17	28	−11	12	
16	Kyoto Purple Sanga	15	3	1	11	14	34	−20	10	

Updated to match(es) played on August 2, 2003. Source: J. League Division 1
Rules for classification: 1) points; 2) goal difference; 3) number of goals scored.
(A) Advance to a further round

=== Results ===
Home \ Away	ANT	CER	GAM	GRA	JEF	JÚB	SAN	REY	SSP	TOK	TRI	RED	VEG	VER	VIS	FMA
Kashima Antlers		0–1			0–2	5–2				2–0		3–1		1–0	3–3	1–3
Cerezo Osaka				2–1	1–3	1–3				0–0		6–4		0–2	0–1	1–4
Gamba Osaka	1–2	0–2			3–3	1–1		2–3	1–0							1–2
Nagoya Grampus Eight	1–0		1–1				1–1	1–1	2–2		2–1		2–1	1–4		
JEF United Ichihara				1–2			5–1			0–0		1–2	5–1	2–1	0–3	3–1
Júbilo Iwata				1–1	2–2		5–0			1–0		1–0		7–2	1–0	2–4
Kyoto Purple Sanga	3–1	2–4	1–2					0–1	0–3		0–2		1–0	2–5		
Kashiwa Reysol	1–2	3–2			0–2	0–1						1–1			0–1	3–1
Shimizu S-Pulse	2–0	4–5			3–0	0–2		0–2							3–0	0–1
FC Tokyo			1–0	1–1			1–0	2–1	0–0		2–1		2–0			
Oita Trinita	1–1	1–2	3–2		0–4	0–4		0–0	0–0							
Urawa Red Diamonds			4–4	0–0			2–0		1–0	0–1	2–1		3–2			
Vegalta Sendai	0–2	1–2	0–2			1–1		1–2	3–1		1–0			3–3		
Tokyo Verdy 1969			2–3					3–1	1–2	2–1	0–2	0–2			3–2	0–3
Vissel Kobe			4–3	0–3			0–2			0–1	0–8	3–2	1–2			
Yokohama F. Marinos				0–0			2–1			3–2	1–0	0–1	1–1		3–0	

Updated to match(es) played on August 2, 2003. Source: J. League Division 1
Legend: Blue = home team win; Yellow = draw; Red = away team win.

== Second stage ==
=== Table ===
Pos	Team	Pld	W	D	L	GF	GA	GD	Pts	Qualification
1	Yokohama F. Marinos (A)	15	7	5	3	27	17	+10	26	Qualification for Suntory Championship
2	JEF United Ichihara	15	7	5	3	24	18	+6	26	
3	Júbilo Iwata	15	7	5	3	22	17	+5	26	
4	Kashima Antlers	15	6	7	2	21	19	+2	25	
5	FC Tokyo	15	6	6	3	32	20	+12	24	
6	Urawa Red Diamonds	15	6	5	4	29	19	+10	23	
7	Gamba Osaka	15	6	5	4	24	17	+7	23	
8	Nagoya Grampus Eight	15	6	4	5	30	26	+4	22	
9	Tokyo Verdy 1969	15	5	6	4	28	25	+3	21	
10	Shimizu S-Pulse	15	6	3	6	19	26	−7	21	
11	Kashiwa Reysol	15	3	7	5	16	20	−4	16	
12	Cerezo Osaka	15	4	3	8	26	27	−1	15	
13	Vissel Kobe	15	3	5	7	17	29	−12	14	
14	Kyoto Purple Sanga	15	3	4	8	14	26	−12	13	
15	Vegalta Sendai	15	2	6	7	14	28	−14	12	
16	Oita Trinita	15	1	8	6	7	16	−9	11	

Updated to match(es) played on November 29, 2003. Source: J. League Division 1
Rules for classification: 1) points; 2) goal difference; 3) number of goals scored.
(A) Advance to a further round

=== Results ===
Home \ Away	ANT	CER	GAM	GRA	JEF	JÚB	SAN	REY	SSP	TOK	TRI	RED	VEG	VER	VIS	FMA
Kashima Antlers			2–2	1–0			1–1	2–1	2–0		1–0		0–0			
Cerezo Osaka	1–1		0–2				2–3	0–1	5–1		2–0		4–2			
Gamba Osaka				3–1			5–1			1–0	1–0	2–1	0–1	2–2	2–2	
Nagoya Grampus Eight		3–1			1–3	2–2				3–2		4–1			1–2	3–2
JEF United Ichihara	2–3	1–0	2–1			1–1		1–1	2–1		1–1					
Júbilo Iwata	1–1	2–2	2–1					1–1	1–0		2–0		1–0			
Kyoto Purple Sanga				1–2	3–2	1–0				1–1		0–0			0–2	0–0
Kashiwa Reysol			1–1	2–2			2–1		2–3	2–4	0–0		1–0	0–2		
Shimizu S-Pulse			1–1	2–1			1–0			1–3	0–0	1–0	2–2	3–1		
FC Tokyo	5–1	2–1			2–2	1–2						1–1		1–1	4–1	4–1
Oita Trinita				0–0			1–0			0–0		1–3	1–1	0–2	2–2	1–1
Urawa Red Diamonds	2–2	3–0			2–2	3–1		0–0						5–1	2–0	0–3
Vegalta Sendai				0–3	1–2		3–1			2–2		1–6			1–1	0–4
Tokyo Verdy 1969	1–1	4–2		4–4	0–2	1–2	4–1						0–0			
Vissel Kobe	2–1	0–4			0–1	1–3		2–2	1–2					0–3		1–1
Yokohama F. Marinos	1–2	2–2	1–0		1–0	2–1		1–0	5–1					2–2		

Updated to match(es) played on November 29, 2003. Source: J. League Division 1
Legend: Blue = home team win; Yellow = draw; Red = away team win.

== Championship ==
In 2003, Suntory Championship was again not held because Yokohama F. Marinos had won both the first and the second stage and thus were automatically declared 2003 J.League Division 1 Champions.

== Overall table ==
Pos	Team	Pld	W	D	L	GF	GA	GD	Pts	Qualification or relegation
1	Yokohama F. Marinos (C)	30	17	7	6	56	33	+23	58	Qualification for AFC Champions League 2004 group stage
2	Júbilo Iwata	30	16	9	5	56	34	+22	57	Qualification for AFC Champions League 2004 group stage
3	JEF United Ichihara	30	15	8	7	57	38	+19	53	
4	FC Tokyo	30	13	10	7	46	31	+15	49	
5	Kashima Antlers	30	13	9	8	44	40	+4	48	
6	Urawa Red Diamonds	30	13	8	9	54	42	+12	47	
7	Nagoya Grampus Eight	30	11	12	7	49	42	+7	45	
8	Tokyo Verdy 1969	30	11	7	12	56	57	−1	40	
9	Cerezo Osaka	30	12	4	14	55	56	−1	40	
10	Gamba Osaka	30	10	9	11	50	46	+4	39	
11	Shimizu S-Pulse	30	11	6	13	39	44	−5	39	
12	Kashiwa Reysol	30	9	10	11	35	39	−4	37	
13	Vissel Kobe	30	8	6	16	35	63	−28	30	
14	Oita Trinita	30	5	11	14	27	37	−10	26	
15	Vegalta Sendai (R)	30	5	9	16	31	56	−25	24	Relegation to 2004 J.League Division 2
16	Kyoto Purple Sanga (R)	30	6	5	19	28	60	−32	23	Relegation to 2004 J.League Division 2

Updated to match(es) played on November 29, 2003. Source: J. League Division 1 first stage, J. League Division 1 second stage
Rules for classification: 1) points; 2) goal difference; 3) number of goals scored.
(C) Champions; (R) Relegated

== Top scorers ==
Rank	Scorer	Club	Goals
1	(Brazil) Ueslei	Nagoya Grampus Eight	22
2	(Brazil) Rodrigo Gral	Júbilo Iwata	21
3	(Brazil) Emerson Sheik	Urawa Red Diamonds	18
4	(South Korea) Choi Yong-soo	JEF United Ichihara	17
5	(Japan) Tatsuhiko Kubo	Yokohama F. Marinos	16
5	(Japan) Yoshito Ōkubo	Cerezo Osaka	16
7	(Brazil) Magrão	Gamba Osaka	15
8	(Brazil) Oséas	Vissel Kobe	13
8	(Cameroon) Patrick Mboma	Tokyo Verdy 1969	13
10	(Japan) Keiji Tamada	Kashiwa Reysol	11
10	(Japan) Tatsuya Tanaka	Urawa Red Diamonds	11
10	(South Korea) Ahn Jung-hwan	Shimizu S-Pulse	11

== Attendance figures ==
Pos	Team	Total	High	Low	Average	Change
1	Urawa Red Diamonds	432,825	51,195	18,335	28,855	+9.7%
2	Yokohama F. Marinos	374,359	59,728	59,728	24,957	+3.5%
3	FC Tokyo	373,978	35,109	15,509	24,932	+12.4%
4	Vegalta Sendai	325,621	33,443	18,696	21,708	−0.7%
5	Oita Trinita	320,597	34,823	11,431	21,373	+73.1%^{†}
6	Kashima Antlers	318,064	39,684	14,045	21,204	−1.8%
7	Tokyo Verdy 1969	263,438	33,597	8,165	17,563	+16.1%
8	Júbilo Iwata	259,010	35,313	10,081	17,267	+4.2%
9	Nagoya Grampus Eight	251,523	30,199	8,570	16,768	+2.7%
10	Shimizu S-Pulse	244,264	33,679	10,445	16,284	+8.8%
11	Cerezo Osaka	207,813	22,931	7,783	13,854	+74.2%^{†}
12	Vissel Kobe	167,931	17,246	6,325	11,195	+7.0%
13	Kashiwa Reysol	163,091	22,968	6,580	10,873	−3.9%
14	Kyoto Purple Sanga	162,751	16,614	7,135	10,850	+4.8%
15	Gamba Osaka	153,324	16,146	4,828	10,222	−19.9%
16	JEF United Ichihara	145,640	29,757	3,452	9,709	+22.9%
	League total	4,164,229	59,728	3,452	17,351	+6.0%

Updated to games played on November 29, 2003
Source: J.League Division 1: first stage, second stage
Notes:
^{†} Team played previous season in J2.

== Awards ==
=== Individual ===
Award	Recipient	Club
Player of the Year	(Brazil) Emerson Sheik	Urawa Red Diamonds
Young Player of the Year	(Japan) Daisuke Nasu	Yokohama F. Marinos
Manager of the Year	(Japan) Takeshi Okada	Yokohama F. Marinos
Top Scorer	(Brazil) Ueslei	Nagoya Grampus Eight

=== Best Eleven ===
Position	Footballer	Club	Nationality
GK	Seigo Narazaki (3)	Nagoya Grampus Eight	Japan
DF	Dutra (1)	Yokohama F. Marinos	Brazil
DF	Yuji Nakazawa (2)	Yokohama F. Marinos	Japan
DF	Keisuke Tsuboi (1)	Urawa Red Diamonds	Japan
MF	Yasuhito Endō (1)	Gamba Osaka	Japan
MF	Takashi Fukunishi (4)	Júbilo Iwata	Japan
MF	Mitsuo Ogasawara (3)	Kashima Antlers	Japan
MF	Daisuke Oku (2)	Yokohama F. Marinos	Japan
FW	Emerson Sheik (2)	Urawa Red Diamonds	Brazil
FW	Ueslei (1)	Nagoya Grampus Eight	Brazil
FW	Tatsuhiko Kubo (1)	Yokohama F. Marinos	Japan

* The number in brackets denotes the number of times that the footballer has appeared in the Best 11.
