= Yuzo Kurihara =

Japanese footballer (born 1983)

Yuzo Kurihara 栗原 勇蔵
Personal information
- Full name: Yuzo Kurihara
- Date of birth: 18 September 1983 (age 43)
- Place of birth: Yokohama, Kanagawa, Japan
- Height: 1.84 m (6 ft 1/2 in)
- Position: Defender

Youth career
- 1996–2001: Yokohama F. Marinos

Senior career*
Years	Team	Apps	(Gls)
2002–2019	Yokohama F. Marinos	316	(16)

International career
2003	Japan U-20	2	(0)
2006–2013	Japan	20	(3)
- * Club domestic league appearances and goals as of end of 2019 season

Yuzo Kurihara (栗原 勇蔵, Kurihara Yūzō; born 18 September 1983) is a Japanese former football player who last played for Yokohama F. Marinos. He played for Japan national team.

== Club career ==
Kurihara was born in Yokohama on 18 September 1983. He joined J1 League club Yokohama F. Marinos from youth team in 2002. Although he debuted as center back in 2003, he could not play many matches behind Japan national team player Naoki Matsuda and Yuji Nakazawa. In 2006, he became a regular player as stopper of three backs defense with Matsuda and Nakazawa. From 2007, he played many matches as center back with Nakazawa of four backs defense. After that, he played many matches as center back for a long time of four backs or three backs defense. In 2013, Marinos won the 2nd place in J1 League and the champions in Emperor's Cup. However his opportunity to play decreased from 2015. He retired from football at the end of the 2019 season.

== National team career ==
In November 2003, Kurihara was selected Japan U-20 national team for 2003 World Youth Championship. He played in 2 matches.

After 2006 World Cup, Ivica Osim became a new manager for Japan national team. His first match on August 9, Kurihara debuted for Japan against Trinidad and Tobago at the Tokyo National Stadium when he replaced Keisuke Tsuboi in the 60th minute. However he could not play at all in the match after the debut. In April 2010, he played for Japan under manager Takeshi Okada against Serbia for the first time in 4 years. Although he was not select Japan for 2010 World Cup, he played several matches as center back every year under Alberto Zaccheroni after 2010 World Cup. In 2013, he was selected for 2013 Confederations Cup and 2013 East Asian Cup. At East Asian Cup, he played all 3 matches and Japan won the champions. This tournament is his last game for Japan. He played 20 games and scored 3 goals for Japan until 2013.

== Club statistics ==
As of end of 2018 season

Appearances and goals by club, season and competition
Club	Season	League			Emperor's Cup		J.League Cup		Asia		Other^{1}		Total	
Club	Season	Division	Apps	Goals	Apps	Goals	Apps	Goals	Apps	Goals	Apps	Goals	Apps	Goals
Yokohama F. Marinos	2002	J1	0	0	0	0	0	0	-		-		0	0
Yokohama F. Marinos	2003	J1	7	0	0	0	2	0	-		-	-	9	0
Yokohama F. Marinos	2004	J1	8	0	2	0	7	0	4	2	3	1	24	3
Yokohama F. Marinos	2005	J1	13	1	1	0	2	1	4	0	4	0	24	2
Yokohama F. Marinos	2006	J1	30	1	3	0	8	0	-		-		41	1
Yokohama F. Marinos	2007	J1	25	1	1	0	8	0	-		-		34	0
Yokohama F. Marinos	2008	J1	24	0	4	1	5	1	-		-		33	2
Yokohama F. Marinos	2009	J1	26	3	2	0	10	0	-		-		38	3
Yokohama F. Marinos	2010	J1	28	2	0	0	6	0	-		-		34	2
Yokohama F. Marinos	2011	J1	30	3	3	0	2	1	-		-		35	4
Yokohama F. Marinos	2012	J1	31	0	3	0	3	0	-		-		37	0
Yokohama F. Marinos	2013	J1	31	2	6	1	6	0	-		-		43	3
Yokohama F. Marinos	2014	J1	29	3	2	0	1	0	4	0	1	0	37	3
Yokohama F. Marinos	2015	J1	11	0	0	0	2	0	-		-		13	0
Yokohama F. Marinos	2016	J1	12	1	2	0	9	0	-		-		23	1
Yokohama F. Marinos	2017	J1	8	0	2	0	6	0	-		-		16	0
Yokohama F. Marinos	2018	J1	3	0	1	0	4	0	-		-		8	0
Yokohama F. Marinos	2019	J1							-		-			
Career total			316	16	32	2	81	3	12	2	8	1	449	24

^{1}Includes Japanese Super Cup and A3 Champions Cup.

=== J.League firsts ===
- Appearance: 26 April 2003. Yokohama F. Marinos 1 vs. 3 JEF United Ichihara, Ichihara Stadium
- Goal: 20 August 2005. Yokohama F. Marinos 1 vs. 3 Júbilo Iwata, Shizuoka Stadium

== National team statistics ==
Japan national team
Year	Apps	Goals
2006	1	0
2007	0	0
2008	0	0
2009	0	0
2010	4	0
2011	3	0
2012	5	2
2013	7	1
Total	20	3

=== International goals ===
Scores and results list Japan's goal tally first.

No	Date	Venue	Opponent	Score	Result	Competition
1.	8 June 2012	Saitama Stadium 2002, Saitama, Japan	Jordan	6–0	6–0	2014 FIFA World Cup qualification
2.	12 June 2012	Suncorp Stadium, Brisbane, Australia	Australia	1–0	1–1	2014 FIFA World Cup qualification
3.	21 July 2013	Seoul World Cup Stadium, Seoul, South Korea	China	1–1	3–3	2013 EAFF East Asian Cup
As of 21 July 2013.

== Honours ==
=== Club ===
Yokohama F. Marinos

- J1 League: 2003, 2004
- Emperor's Cup: 2013

=== Japan ===
- EAFF East Asian Cup: 2013
