= 2008 Yokohama F. Marinos season =

Yokohama F. Marinos
2008 season
- Manager: Takashi Kuwahara; Kokichi Kimura
- Stadium: Nissan Stadium
- J.League 1: 9th
- Emperor's Cup: Semifinals
- J.League Cup: Quarterfinals
- Top goalscorer: Takanobu Komiyama (7); Hideo Ōshima (7)
- Average home league attendance: 23,682
Home colours	Away colours

2008 Yokohama F. Marinos season

== Competitions ==
Competitions	Position
J.League 1	9th / 18 clubs
Emperor's Cup	Semifinals
J.League Cup	Quarterfinals

== Domestic results ==
=== J.League 1 ===
Match	Date	Venue	Opponents	Score
1	2008..			-
2	2008..			-
3	2008..			-
4	2008..			-
5	2008..			-
6	2008..			-
7	2008..			-
8	2008..			-
9	2008..			-
10	2008..			-
11	2008..			-
12	2008..			-
13	2008..			-
14	2008..			-
15	2008..			-
16	2008..			-
17	2008..			-
18	2008..			-
19	2008..			-
20	2008..			-
21	2008..			-
22	2008..			-
23	2008..			-
24	2008..			-
25	2008..			-
26	2008..			-
27	2008..			-
28	2008..			-
29	2008..			-
30	2008..			-
31	2008..			-
32	2008..			-
33	2008..			-
34	2008..			-

=== Emperor's Cup ===
Match	Date	Venue	Opponents	Score
4th Round	2008..			-
5th Round	2008..			-
Quarterfinals	2008..			-
Semifinals	2008..			-

=== J.League Cup ===
Match	Date	Venue	Opponents	Score
GL-D-1	2008..			-
GL-D-2	2008..			-
GL-D-3	2008..			-
GL-D-4	2008..			-
GL-D-5	2008..			-
GL-D-6	2008..			-
Quarterfinals-1	2008..			-
Quarterfinals-2	2008..			-

== Player statistics ==
No.	Pos.	Player	D.o.B. (Age)	Height / Weight	J.League 1		Emperor's Cup		J.League Cup		Total	
No.	Pos.	Player	D.o.B. (Age)	Height / Weight	Apps	Goals	Apps	Goals	Apps	Goals	Apps	Goals
1	GK	Tetsuya Enomoto	May 2, 1983 (aged 24)	cm / kg	31	0						
3	DF	Naoki Matsuda	March 14, 1977 (aged 30)	cm / kg	30	1						
4	DF	Yuzo Kurihara	September 18, 1983 (aged 24)	cm / kg	24	0						
6	MF	Ryuji Kawai	July 14, 1978 (aged 29)	cm / kg	20	3						
7	DF	Hayuma Tanaka	July 31, 1982 (aged 25)	cm / kg	32	1						
8	MF	Lopes	June 1, 1979 (aged 28)	cm / kg	16	1						
9	FW	Rôni	April 28, 1977 (aged 30)	cm / kg	16	5						
10	MF	Koji Yamase	September 22, 1981 (aged 26)	cm / kg	25	4						
11	FW	Daisuke Sakata	January 16, 1983 (aged 25)	cm / kg	32	1						
13	DF	Takanobu Komiyama	October 3, 1984 (aged 23)	cm / kg	31	7						
14	MF	Kenta Kano	May 2, 1986 (aged 21)	cm / kg	13	3						
15	FW	Hideo Ōshima	March 7, 1980 (aged 28)	cm / kg	29	7						
16	MF	Yukihiro Yamase	April 22, 1984 (aged 23)	cm / kg	9	0						
17	MF	Shingo Hyodo	July 29, 1985 (aged 22)	cm / kg	28	2						
18	FW	Norihisa Shimizu	October 4, 1976 (aged 31)	cm / kg	19	0						
19	MF	Takashi Inui	June 2, 1988 (aged 19)	cm / kg	0	0						
20	MF	Kota Mizunuma	February 22, 1990 (aged 18)	cm / kg	10	0						
21	GK	Daijiro Takakuwa	August 10, 1973 (aged 34)	cm / kg	0	0						
22	DF	Yuji Nakazawa	February 25, 1978 (aged 30)	cm / kg	33	4						
23	DF	Masakazu Tashiro	June 26, 1988 (aged 19)	cm / kg	0	0						
24	DF	Takashi Kanai	February 5, 1990 (aged 18)	cm / kg	5	0						
25	MF	Fumiya Yamamoto	July 12, 1988 (aged 19)	cm / kg	0	0						
26	DF	Yūsuke Tanaka	April 14, 1986 (aged 21)	cm / kg	25	1						
27	FW	Yosuke Saito	April 7, 1988 (aged 19)	cm / kg	1	0						
28	DF	Nobuhisa Urata	September 13, 1989 (aged 18)	cm / kg	0	0						
29	MF	Aria Jasuru Hasegawa	October 29, 1988 (aged 19)	cm / kg	8	1						
30	MF	Shōhei Ogura	September 8, 1985 (aged 22)	cm / kg	12	0						
31	GK	Hiroki Iikura	June 1, 1986 (aged 21)	cm / kg	0	0						
32	MF	Kenta Furube	November 30, 1985 (aged 22)	cm / kg	0	0						
33	DF	Daiki Umei	October 5, 1989 (aged 18)	cm / kg	0	0						
34	MF	Taku Ishihara	October 3, 1988 (aged 19)	cm / kg	0	0						
35	DF	Takashi Amano	April 13, 1986 (aged 21)	cm / kg	0	0						
36	GK	Yota Akimoto	July 11, 1987 (aged 20)	cm / kg	3	0						
37	FW	Manabu Saito	April 4, 1990 (aged 17)	cm / kg	7	0						
38	DF	Kim Kun-Hoan	August 12, 1986 (aged 21)	cm / kg	7	1						

== Other pages ==
- (in Japanese) J.League official site
