= 2007 Yokohama F. Marinos season =

Yokohama F. Marinos
2007 season
- Manager: Hiroshi Hayano
- Stadium: Nissan Stadium
- J.League 1: 7th
- Emperor's Cup: 5th Round
- J.League Cup: Semifinals
- Top goalscorer: Hideo Ōshima (14)
- Average home league attendance: 24,039
| Home colours | Away colours |

2007 Yokohama F. Marinos season

== Competitions ==
| Competitions | Position |
|---|---|
| J.League 1 | 7th / 18 clubs |
| Emperor's Cup | 5th Round |
| J.League Cup | Semifinals |

== Domestic results ==
=== J.League 1 ===
| Match | Date | Venue | Opponents | Score |
|---|---|---|---|---|
| 1 | 2007.. | | | - |
| 2 | 2007.. | | | - |
| 3 | 2007.. | | | - |
| 4 | 2007.. | | | - |
| 5 | 2007.. | | | - |
| 6 | 2007.. | | | - |
| 7 | 2007.. | | | - |
| 8 | 2007.. | | | - |
| 9 | 2007.. | | | - |
| 10 | 2007.. | | | - |
| 11 | 2007.. | | | - |
| 12 | 2007.. | | | - |
| 13 | 2007.. | | | - |
| 14 | 2007.. | | | - |
| 15 | 2007.. | | | - |
| 16 | 2007.. | | | - |
| 17 | 2007.. | | | - |
| 18 | 2007.. | | | - |
| 19 | 2007.. | | | - |
| 20 | 2007.. | | | - |
| 21 | 2007.. | | | - |
| 22 | 2007.. | | | - |
| 23 | 2007.. | | | - |
| 24 | 2007.. | | | - |
| 25 | 2007.. | | | - |
| 26 | 2007.. | | | - |
| 27 | 2007.. | | | - |
| 28 | 2007.. | | | - |
| 29 | 2007.. | | | - |
| 30 | 2007.. | | | - |
| 31 | 2007.. | | | - |
| 32 | 2007.. | | | - |
| 33 | 2007.. | | | - |
| 34 | 2007.. | | | - |

=== Emperor's Cup ===
| Match | Date | Venue | Opponents | Score |
|---|---|---|---|---|
| 4th Round | 2007.. | | | - |
| 5th Round | 2007.. | | | - |

=== J.League Cup ===
| Match | Date | Venue | Opponents | Score |
|---|---|---|---|---|
| GL-B-1 | 2007.. | | | - |
| GL-B-2 | 2007.. | | | - |
| GL-B-3 | 2007.. | | | - |
| GL-B-4 | 2007.. | | | - |
| GL-B-5 | 2007.. | | | - |
| GL-B-6 | 2007.. | | | - |
| Quarterfinals-1 | 2007.. | | | - |
| Quarterfinals-2 | 2007.. | | | - |
| Semifinals-1 | 2007.. | | | - |
| Semifinals-2 | 2007.. | | | - |

== Player statistics ==
| No. | Pos. | Player | D.o.B. (Age) | Height / Weight | J.League 1 | | Emperor's Cup | | J.League Cup | | Total | |
| No. | Pos. | Player | D.o.B. (Age) | Height / Weight | Apps | Goals | Apps | Goals | Apps | Goals | Apps | Goals |
|---|---|---|---|---|---|---|---|---|---|---|---|---|
| 1 | GK | Tetsuya Enomoto | May 2, 1983 (aged 23) | cm / kg | 33 | 0 | | | | | | |
| 2 | DF | Eltinho | July 7, 1987 (aged 19) | cm / kg | 0 | 0 | | | | | | |
| 3 | DF | Naoki Matsuda | March 14, 1977 (aged 29) | cm / kg | 8 | 1 | | | | | | |
| 4 | MF | Daisuke Nasu | October 10, 1981 (aged 25) | cm / kg | 18 | 0 | | | | | | |
| 6 | MF | Yoshiharu Ueno | April 21, 1973 (aged 33) | cm / kg | 6 | 1 | | | | | | |
| 7 | DF | Hayuma Tanaka | July 31, 1982 (aged 24) | cm / kg | 32 | 2 | | | | | | |
| 8 | FW | Marques | February 12, 1973 (aged 34) | cm / kg | 12 | 0 | | | | | | |
| 9 | FW | Takayuki Suzuki | June 5, 1976 (aged 30) | cm / kg | 3 | 0 | | | | | | |
| 10 | MF | Koji Yamase | September 22, 1981 (aged 25) | cm / kg | 32 | 11 | | | | | | |
| 11 | FW | Daisuke Sakata | January 16, 1983 (aged 24) | cm / kg | 34 | 10 | | | | | | |
| 13 | DF | Takanobu Komiyama | October 3, 1984 (aged 22) | cm / kg | 25 | 0 | | | | | | |
| 14 | MF | Kenta Kano | May 2, 1986 (aged 20) | cm / kg | 18 | 0 | | | | | | |
| 15 | FW | Hideo Ōshima | March 7, 1980 (aged 26) | cm / kg | 30 | 14 | | | | | | |
| 16 | MF | Koji Yoshimura | April 13, 1976 (aged 30) | cm / kg | 0 | 0 | | | | | | |
| 17 | FW | Takayuki Yoshida | March 14, 1977 (aged 29) | cm / kg | 22 | 3 | | | | | | |
| 18 | FW | Norihisa Shimizu | October 4, 1976 (aged 30) | cm / kg | 12 | 1 | | | | | | |
| 19 | MF | Takashi Inui | June 2, 1988 (aged 18) | cm / kg | 7 | 0 | | | | | | |
| 20 | FW | Mike Havenaar | May 20, 1987 (aged 19) | cm / kg | 15 | 0 | | | | | | |
| 21 | GK | Daijiro Takakuwa | August 10, 1973 (aged 33) | cm / kg | 1 | 0 | | | | | | |
| 22 | DF | Yuji Nakazawa | February 25, 1978 (aged 29) | cm / kg | 32 | 2 | | | | | | |
| 23 | DF | Masakazu Tashiro | June 26, 1988 (aged 18) | cm / kg | 0 | 0 | | | | | | |
| 24 | MF | Taketo Shiokawa | December 17, 1977 (aged 29) | cm / kg | 0 | 0 | | | | | | |
| 25 | MF | Fumiya Yamamoto | July 12, 1988 (aged 18) | cm / kg | 0 | 0 | | | | | | |
| 26 | DF | Yūsuke Tanaka | April 14, 1986 (aged 20) | cm / kg | 10 | 0 | | | | | | |
| 27 | FW | Yosuke Saito | April 7, 1988 (aged 18) | cm / kg | 11 | 0 | | | | | | |
| 28 | DF | Takashi Amano | April 13, 1986 (aged 20) | cm / kg | 3 | 0 | | | | | | |
| 29 | MF | Aria Jasuru Hasegawa | October 29, 1988 (aged 18) | cm / kg | 2 | 0 | | | | | | |
| 30 | DF | Yuzo Kurihara | September 18, 1983 (aged 23) | cm / kg | 25 | 0 | | | | | | |
| 31 | GK | Hiroki Iikura | June 1, 1986 (aged 20) | cm / kg | 1 | 0 | | | | | | |
| 32 | MF | Yukihiro Yamase | April 22, 1984 (aged 22) | cm / kg | 30 | 4 | | | | | | |
| 33 | MF | Marcus | February 25, 1974 (aged 33) | cm / kg | 2 | 0 | | | | | | |
| 34 | MF | Taku Ishihara | October 3, 1988 (aged 18) | cm / kg | 0 | 0 | | | | | | |
| 35 | MF | Ryuji Kawai | July 14, 1978 (aged 28) | cm / kg | 33 | 3 | | | | | | |
| 36 | GK | Yota Akimoto | July 11, 1987 (aged 19) | cm / kg | 0 | 0 | | | | | | |
| 37 | GK | Yasuhiro Tominaga | May 22, 1980 (aged 26) | cm / kg | 0 | 0 | | | | | | |
| 38 | MF | Kota Mizunuma | February 22, 1990 (aged 17) | cm / kg | 3 | 0 | | | | | | |

== Other pages ==
- (in Japanese) J.League official site
