= Yuji Nakazawa =

Japanese footballer (born 1978)

Yuji Nakazawa 中澤 佑二
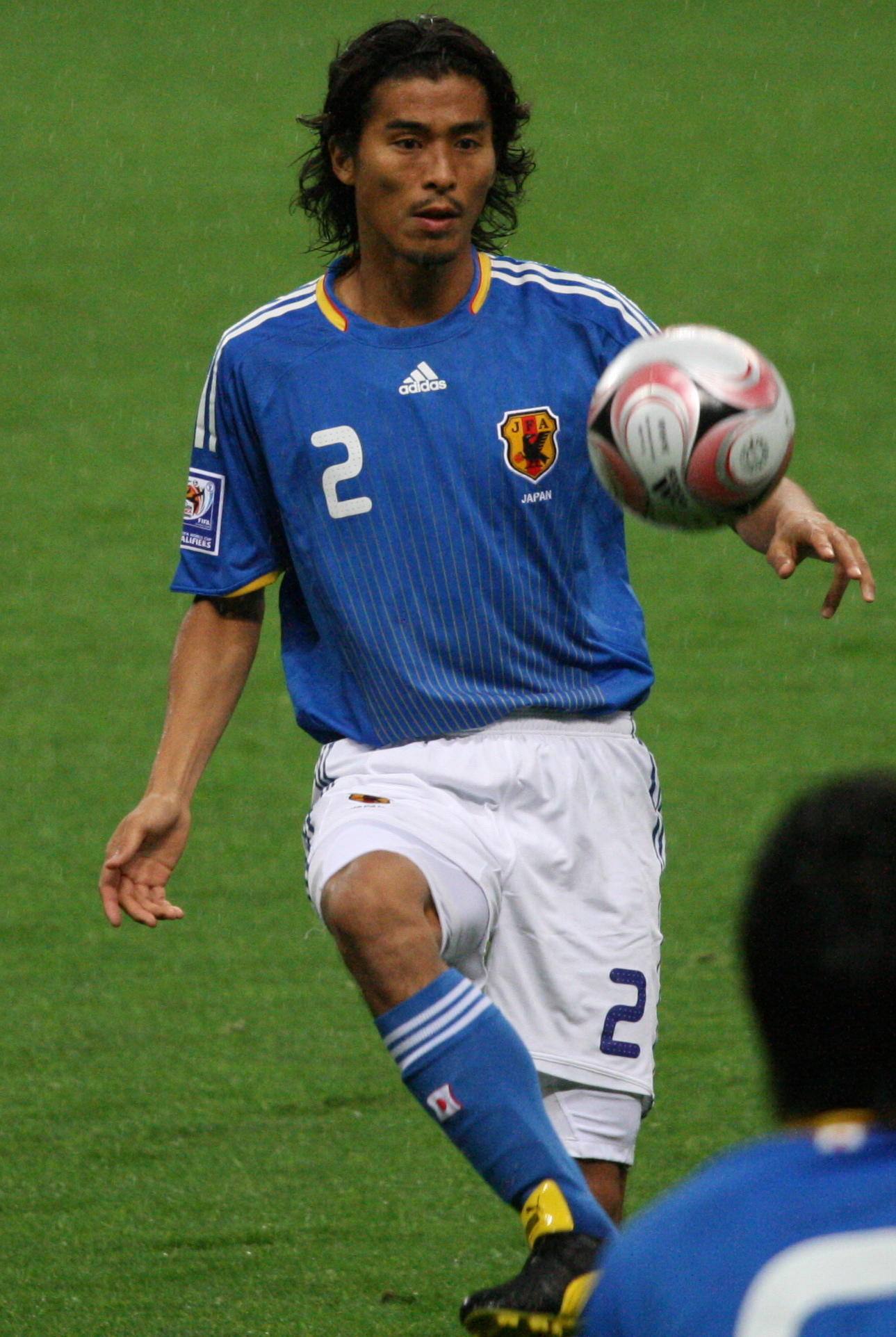
- Nakazawa with Japan in 2008

Personal information
- Full name: Yuji Nakazawa
- Date of birth: 25 February 1978 (age 48)
- Place of birth: Yoshikawa, Saitama, Japan
- Height: 1.87 m (6 ft 2 in)
- Position: Centre-back

Youth career
- 1990–1992: Yoshikawa Higashi Junior High School
- 1993–1995: Misato Kogyo High School
- 1996–1997: América Mineiro

Senior career*
Years	Team	Apps	(Gls)
1999–2001	Tokyo Verdy	83	(5)
2002–2018	Yokohama F. Marinos	510	(31)
Total		593	(36)

International career
1999–2000	Japan U-23	12	(0)
1999–2010	Japan	110	(17)
Medal record
Yokohama F. Marinos
Winner	J1 League	2003
Winner	J1 League	2004
Runner-up	J1 League	2002
Runner-up	J1 League	2013
Runner-up	J.League Cup	2018
Winner	Emperor's Cup	2013
Runner-up	Emperor's Cup	2017
Representing Japan
AFC Asian Cup
Gold medal – first place	2000 Lebanon
Gold medal – first place	2004 China
- * Club domestic league appearances and goals

Yuji Nakazawa (中澤 佑二, Nakazawa Yūji; born 25 February 1978) is a Japanese former professional footballer who most notably played as a centre back for J1 League sides Tokyo Verdy and Yokohama F. Marinos. He was the formerly the captain of the Japan national team. His nickname is "The Bomber" because of his distinctive hairstyle and heading ability.

Nakazawa is one of only seven Japanese players to reach 100 caps for his national team and he is the third highest number of J.League all-time appearances in history with 593 appearances. Nakazawa also played for 178 consecutive matches for Yokohama F. Marinos from July 2013 to August 2018.

== Club career ==
=== Youth ===
Nakazawa started playing football for Yoshikawa Higashi Junior High School and Misato Technology High School, but attracted no scouts there. Determined to go professional, he left for Brazil to train with América Mineiro. During his time there, he won the Campeonato Mineiro in the junior category and played a key role in coach Ricardo Drubscky's squad.

=== Tokyo Verdy ===
After a year, he returned to Japan and joined Verdy Kawasaki (later Tokyo Verdy) in 1998 as a trainee, which meant he received no compensation. He impressed the club enough to win a full professional contract the following year.

His first J1 League appearance came on 13 March 1999 against Cerezo Osaka at Todoroki Athletics Stadium. He scored his first league goal on 10 April 1999 against Nagoya Grampus Eight also at Todoroki. That year, he received the J.League Young Player of the Year award and was selected for the J.League Team of the Year.

=== Yokohama F. Marinos ===
Nakazawa was transferred to Yokohama F. Marinos in 2002 and contributed to the club winning two consecutive J1 League championships in 2003 and 2004. He was selected as the Most Valuable Player of the league in 2004. He played more than 30 games every season from 2007 except 2010 season. He also played full time for 178 consecutive games from July 2013 to August 2018. This is a J.League record except goalkeeper. However he could not play at all in the match from August 2018 except last match in 2018 season.

On 8 January 2019, Yokohama F. Marinos announced his retirement at 2018 season. He was 40 years old.

== International career ==
Philippe Troussier called him up for Japan national team. Nakazawa played in Olympic qualifiers as well as the finals in Sydney. Troussier promoted him to a full international. His first international appearance came on 8 September 1999 in a friendly against Iran at the International Stadium Yokohama. He scored his first goal on 13 February 2000 in an Asian Cup qualifier against Singapore in Macau.

He was a member of the Japan team who won the 2000 AFC Asian Cup in Lebanon. He played three games in the competition. However, he was not selected for the 2002 FIFA World Cup finals as Yutaka Akita was preferred.

Under new national manager Zico, he partnered with Tsuneyasu Miyamoto at the back line. He participated in the 2004 AFC Asian Cup finals. He played in all the Japan matches and scored three goals, one of which was a stoppage time equaliser in the semi-final against Bahrain, and Japan went on to win the title again.

He also played in the 2006 FIFA World Cup in Germany but the team failed to proceed to the knockout stage. After the tournament, he announced his retirement from the international football at the age of 28. However, six months later, he withdrew his decision and Ivica Osim played him in a friendly against Peru on 24 March 2007.

He played in the 2007 AFC Asian Cup finals but this time the team failed to defend the title and finished 4th in the tournament.

On 14 February 2010, Nakazawa made his 100th appearance for the Japan national team against South Korea in the final match of the 2010 East Asian Football Championship at Tokyo National Stadium. Nakazawa becomes only the third Japanese player, following Masami Ihara and Yoshikatsu Kawaguchi, to reach 100 caps for his country. Later that year, Yasuhito Endo also reached 100 caps for Japan.

On 30 May 2010, Nakazawa scored an own-goal in a friendly match against England to give England the lead; his defensive partner Marcus Tulio Tanaka had already scored an own goal to draw England level with Japan. The match ended 2–1 to England.

In the 2010 FIFA World Cup, Nakazawa played all four of Japan's games on their way to the round of 16 and knockout by penalties to Paraguay.

== Career statistics ==
=== Club ===
Appearances and goals by club, season and competition
Club	Season	League			Emperor's Cup		J.League Cup		Asia		Other (Note: Includes Japanese Super Cup and J.League Championship.)		Total	
Club	Season	Division	Apps	Goals	Apps	Goals	Apps	Goals	Apps	Goals	Apps	Goals	Apps	Goals
Tokyo Verdy (Note: "Verdy Kawasaki" until 2001)	1999	J1 League	28	1	3	1	2	0	–		–		33	2
Tokyo Verdy	2000	J1 League	29	4	2	0	3	0	–		–		34	4
Tokyo Verdy	2001	J1 League	26	0	0	0	2	0	–		–		28	0
Tokyo Verdy	Total		83	5	5	1	7	0	–		–		95	6
Yokohama F. Marinos	2002	J1 League	27	1	2	0	0	0	–		–		29	1
Yokohama F. Marinos	2003	J1 League	29	4	2	0	7	2	–		–		38	6
Yokohama F. Marinos	2004	J1 League	27	1	1	0	0	0	2	0	3	0	33	1
Yokohama F. Marinos	2005	J1 League	27	3	1	0	3	0	4	0	1	0	36	3
Yokohama F. Marinos	2006	J1 League	23	1	3	0	2	0	–		–		28	1
Yokohama F. Marinos	2007	J1 League	32	2	1	0	7	0	–		–		40	2
Yokohama F. Marinos	2008	J1 League	33	4	3	1	3	0	–		–		39	5
Yokohama F. Marinos	2009	J1 League	32	3	1	0	3	0	–		–		36	3
Yokohama F. Marinos	2010	J1 League	22	0	0	0	2	1	–		–		24	1
Yokohama F. Marinos	2011	J1 League	33	1	5	0	5	0	–		–		43	1
Yokohama F. Marinos	2012	J1 League	33	3	5	0	3	0	–		–		41	3
Yokohama F. Marinos	2013	J1 League	34	1	3	1	8	0	–		–		45	2
Yokohama F. Marinos	2014	J1 League	34	2	0	0	2	1	5	0	1	0	39	3
Yokohama F. Marinos	2015	J1 League	34	0	3	0	3	0	–		–		40	0
Yokohama F. Marinos	2016	J1 League	34	3	5	0	6	0	–		–		45	3
Yokohama F. Marinos	2017	J1 League	34	1	2	0	0	0	–		–		36	1
Yokohama F. Marinos	2018	J1 League	22	1	1	0	2	0	–		–		25	1
Yokohama F. Marinos	Total		510	31	38	2	56	4	11	0	5	0	620	37
Career total			593	36	43	3	63	4	11	0	5	0	715	43

=== International ===
Appearances and goals by national team and year
National team	Year	Apps	Goals
Japan	1999	1	0
Japan	2000	6	2
Japan	2001	2	0
Japan	2002	1	0
Japan	2003	4	0
Japan	2004	15	5
Japan	2005	12	1
Japan	2006	12	1
Japan	2007	13	2
Japan	2008	16	4
Japan	2009	14	2
Japan	2010	14	0
Total		110	17

Scores and results list Japan's goal tally first, score column indicates score after each Nakazawa goal.

List of international goals scored by Yuji Nakazawa
No.	Date	Venue	Opponent	Score	Result	Competition
1	13 February 2000	Macau, China	Singapore		3–0	2000 AFC Asian Cup qualification
2	13 February 2000	Macau, China	Singapore		3–0	2000 AFC Asian Cup qualification
3	9 June 2004	Saitama, Japan	India		7–0	2006 FIFA World Cup qualification
4	9 June 2004	Saitama, Japan	India		7–0	2006 FIFA World Cup qualification
5	24 July 2004	Chongqing, China	Thailand		4–1	2004 AFC Asian Cup
6	24 July 2004	Chongqing, China	Thailand		4–1	2004 AFC Asian Cup
7	3 August 2004	Jinan, China	Bahrain		4–3	2004 AFC Asian Cup
8	7 August 2005	Daegu, South Korea	South Korea		1–0	2005 East Asian Football Championship
9	10 February 2006	San Francisco, United States	United States		2–3	Friendly
10	1 June 2007	Fukuroi, Japan	Montenegro		2–0	2007 Kirin Cup
11	25 July 2007	Hanoi, Vietnam	Saudi Arabia		2–3	2007 AFC Asian Cup
12	28 January 2008	Tokyo, Japan	Bosnia and Herzegovina		3–0	Friendly
13	6 February 2008	Saitama, Japan	Thailand		4–1	2010 FIFA World Cup qualification
14	2 June 2008	Yokohama, Japan	Oman		3–0	FIFA World Cup qualification
15	14 June 2008	Bangkok, Thailand	Thailand		3–0	FIFA World Cup qualification
16	4 February 2009	Tokyo, Japan	Finland		5–1	Friendly
17	8 October 2009	Shizuoka, Japan	Hong Kong		6–0	2011 AFC Asian Cup qualification

== Honours ==
Yokohama F. Marinos

- J1 League: 2003, 2004
- Emperor's Cup: 2013

Japan

- AFC Asian Cup: 2000, 2004

Individual

- AFC Asian Cup Best Eleven – 2004
- J.League Most Valuable Player – 2004
- J.League Rookie of the Year – 1999
- J.League Best Eleven – 1999, 2003, 2004, 2005, 2008, 2013
- J.League 20th Anniversary Team
- J.League 30th Anniversary Team
- Japanese Footballer of the Year – 2004
- Selected to AFC All Star Team – 1999
- East Asian Football Championship Best Defender – 2008
- AFC Asian Cup All-time XI: 2023

== See also ==
- List of footballers with 100 or more caps
