= Ryuji Kawai =

Japanese footballer (born 1978)

Ryuji Kawai 河合 竜二
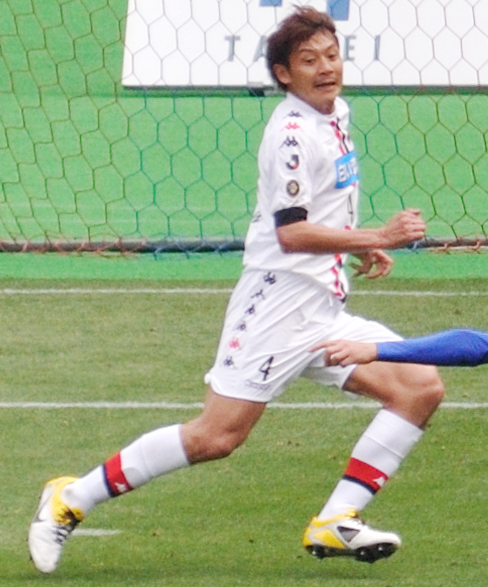

Personal information
- Full name: Ryuji Kawai
- Date of birth: July 14, 1978 (age 48)
- Place of birth: Itabashi, Japan
- Height: 1.83 m (6 ft 0 in)
- Positions: Defender; midfielder

Youth career
- 1994–1996: Seibudai High School

Senior career*
Years	Team	Apps	(Gls)
1997–2002	Urawa Reds	14	(0)
2003–2010	Yokohama F. Marinos	145	(9)
2011–2018	Hokkaido Consadole Sapporo	179	(2)
Total		338	(11)
Medal record
Urawa Reds
Runner-up	J.League Cup	2002
Yokohama F. Marinos
Winner	J1 League	2003
Winner	J1 League	2004
- * Club domestic league appearances and goals

Ryuji Kawai (河合 竜二, Kawai Ryuji; born July 14, 1978) is a Japanese former football player.

== Playing career ==
Kawai was born in Itabashi, Tokyo on July 14, 1978. After graduating from high school, he joined J1 League club Urawa Reds in 1997. However he could not play at all in the match until 1999 and the club was relegated to J2 League end of 1999 season. In 2000, he debuted in May and played many matches as defensive midfielder under manager Kazuo Saito. The club was also returned to J1 end of 2000 season. However Kawai could hardly play in the match under new manager from 2001. He was sacked end of 2002 season.

In 2003, Kawai signed with Yokohama F. Marinos which many Japan national team players played for the club. He could not play at all in the match until summer 2003. However regular center-back Naoki Matsuda was injured summer and Kawai played many matches as center-back instead Matsuda and Marinos won the champions in J1. In 2004, although his opportunity to play decreased, Marinos won the champions for 2 years in a row. In 2005, he became a regular left-back of three back defense with Naoki Matsuda and Yuji Nakazawa. In 2006, he played many matches as regular defensive midfielder with Yoshiharu Ueno. In 2007, he played all matches as defensive midfielder without one match for suspension. In 2008, although he could not play for injury until summer, he played many matches from summer. From 2009, his opportunity to play decreased and he resigned end of 2010 season.

In 2011, Kawai moved to J2 League club Consadole Sapporo (later Hokkaido Consadole Sapporo). In 2011 season, he played many matches as center-back with Tatsuya Yamashita until summer and defensive midfielder with Hiroki Miyazawa from summer. Consadole won the 3rd place and was promoted to J1. Although he played as defensive midfielder in 2012 season, Consadole finished at the bottom place and was relegated to J2. From 2014, he played many matches as center back. In 2016, although his opportunity to play decreased, Consadole won the champions in J2 and was promoted to J1. In 2018, he could not play at all in the match and retired end of 2018 season. He was 40 years old.

== Club statistics ==
Club performance			League		Cup		League Cup		Continental		Total	
Season	Club	League	Apps	Goals	Apps	Goals	Apps	Goals	Apps	Goals	Apps	Goals
Japan			League		Emperor's Cup		J.League Cup		AFC		Total	
1997	Urawa Reds	J1 League	0	0	0	0	0	0	-		0	0
1998	Urawa Reds	J1 League	0	0	0	0	0	0	-		0	0
1999	Urawa Reds	J1 League	0	0	0	0	0	0	-		0	0
2000	Urawa Reds	J2 League	13	0	2	0	0	0	-		15	0
2001	Urawa Reds	J1 League	1	0	1	0	0	0	-		2	0
2002	Urawa Reds	J1 League	0	0	0	0	0	0	-		0	0
Total			14	0	3	0	0	0	-		17	0
2003	Yokohama F. Marinos	J1 League	11	0	3	1	3	0	-		17	1
2004	Yokohama F. Marinos	J1 League	9	0	1	0	3	0	3	1	16	1
2005	Yokohama F. Marinos	J1 League	22	1	0	0	2	0	3	0	27	1
2006	Yokohama F. Marinos	J1 League	25	1	3	0	9	0	-		37	1
2007	Yokohama F. Marinos	J1 League	33	3	2	0	7	0	-		42	3
2008	Yokohama F. Marinos	J1 League	20	3	3	0	5	0	-		28	3
2009	Yokohama F. Marinos	J1 League	11	0	3	0	2	0	-		16	0
2010	Yokohama F. Marinos	J1 League	14	1	1	0	3	0	-		18	1
Total			145	9	16	1	34	0	6	1	201	11
2011	Consadole Sapporo	J2 League	37	1	0	0	-		-		37	1
2012	Consadole Sapporo	J1 League	25	0	1	0	1	0	-		27	0
2013	Consadole Sapporo	J2 League	21	0	1	0	-		-		22	0
2014	Consadole Sapporo	J2 League	31	1	1	0	-		-		32	1
2015	Consadole Sapporo	J2 League	30	0	1	0	-		-		31	0
2016	Hokkaido Consadole Sapporo	J2 League	15	0	2	0	-		-		17	0
2017	Hokkaido Consadole Sapporo	J1 League	20	0	0	0	5	0	-		25	0
2018	Hokkaido Consadole Sapporo	J1 League	0	0	0	0	0	0	-		0	0
Total			179	2	6	0	6	0	-		191	2
Career total			338	11	25	1	40	0	6	1	409	13

== J.League Firsts ==
- Appearance: May 22, 2000. Urawa Reds 6 vs 0 Omiya Ardija, Omiya Park Soccer Stadium
- Goal: April 2, 2005. Yokohama F. Marinos 4 vs 1 Albirex Niigata, Nissan Stadium
