= Keita Endō =

Japanese footballer (born 1997)

Keita Endō 遠藤 渓太
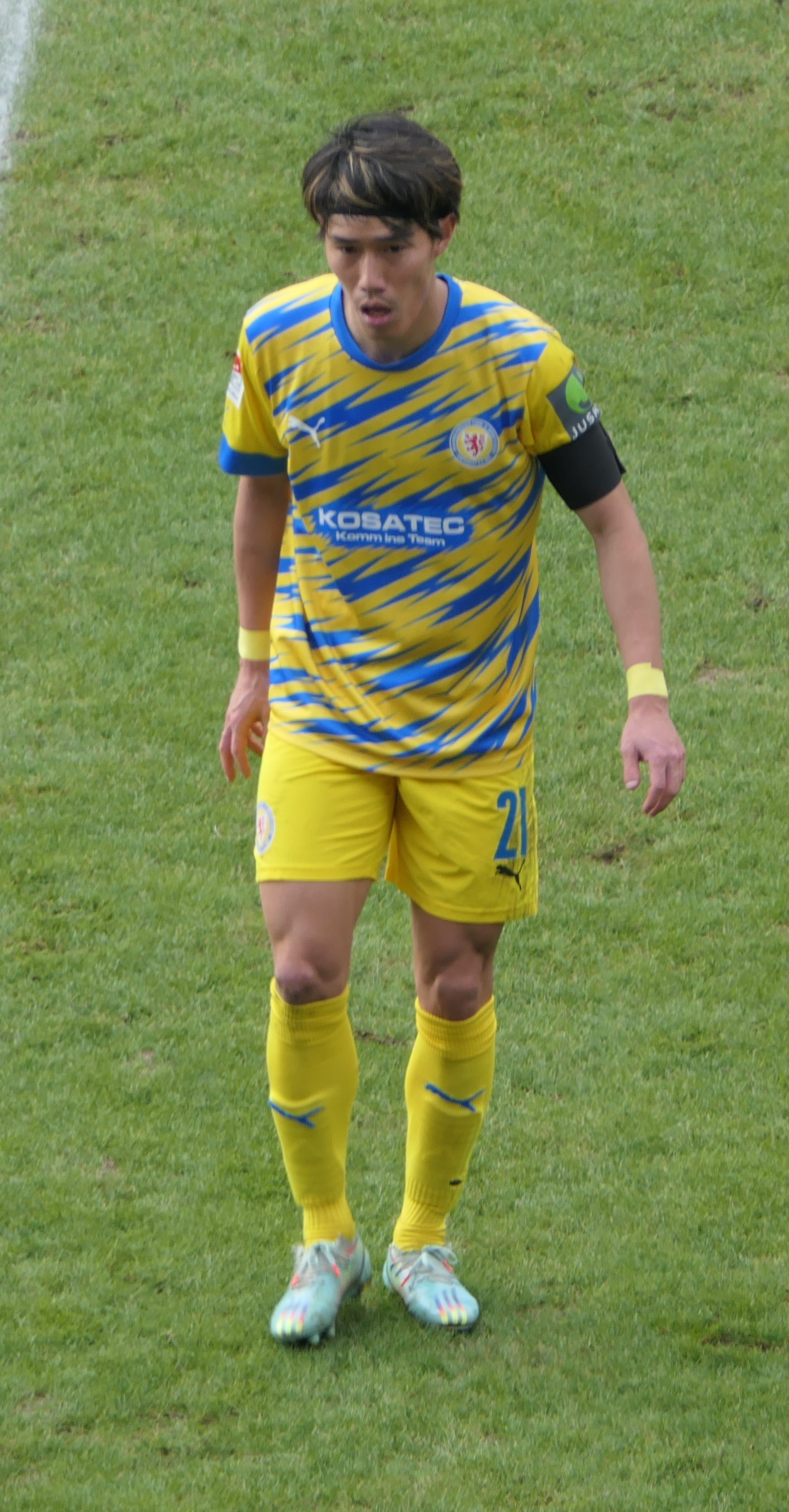
- Endō with Eintracht Braunschweig in 2023

Personal information
- Date of birth: 22 November 1997 (age 28)
- Place of birth: Asahi-ku, Yokohama, Japan
- Height: 1.75 m (5 ft 9 in)
- Position: Winger

Team information
- Current team: Kashiwa Reysol
- Number: 5

Youth career
- Futamatagawa SC
- 2010–2015: Yokohama F. Marinos

Senior career*
Years	Team	Apps	(Gls)
2016–2021	Yokohama F. Marinos	103	(13)
2020–2021	→ Union Berlin (loan)	16	(1)
2021–2024	Union Berlin	4	(0)
2022–2024	→ Eintracht Braunschweig (loan)	24	(0)
2024	→ FC Tokyo (loan)	11	(2)
2024–2026	FC Tokyo	59	(11)
2026–	Kashiwa Reysol	1	(0)

International career^{‡}
2016	Japan U19	4	(0)
2017	Japan U20	3	(0)
2018	Japan U21	4	(0)
2018–2021	Japan U23	11	(0)
2019–	Japan	2	(0)
Medal record
Yokohama F. Marinos
Runner-up	J.League Cup	2018
Runner-up	Emperor's Cup	2017
Representing Japan
Men's football
Asian Games
Silver medal – second place	2018 Jakarta-Palembang	Team
EAFF Championship
Runner-up	2019 South Korea	Team
AFC U-19 Championship
Gold medal – first place	2016 Bahrain
- * Club domestic league appearances and goals as of 10 August 2026 ‡ National team caps and goals as of 23:25, 7 July 2021 (UTC)

Keita Endō (遠藤 渓太, Endō Keita; born 22 November 1997) is a Japanese professional footballer who plays as a winger for J1 League club Kashiwa Reysol and the Japan national team.

== Club career ==
=== Yokohama F. Marinos ===
Keita made his league debut for Yokohama against Albirex Niigata on 12 March 2016. He scored his first goal for the club against Gamba Osaka on 30 September 2017, scoring in the 89th minute.

=== Union Berlin ===
On 25 July 2020, Endō joined Union Berlin on a season-long loan deal with the option to buy. He was expected to join Union Berlin on a permanent basis at the end of the 2020–21 season. He made his league debut for Union against Mainz 05 on 2 October 2020. He scored his first goal for Union against Arminia Bielefeld on 7 November 2020, scoring in the 3rd minute.

=== Loan to Eintracht Braunschweig ===
On 19 July 2022, Endō joined Eintracht Braunschweig on a season-long loan from Union Berlin. He made his league debut against Heidenheim on 23 July 2022. On 8 July 2023, it was announced that the loan-deal was extended until 30 June 2024.

=== FC Tokyo ===
On 7 January 2024, Endō moved on a new loan to FC Tokyo. On 11 April 2024, the loan deal became permanent.

== International career ==
In May 2017, Endō was named in the Japan U20 national team's squad for the 2017 U-20 World Cup. In this tournament, he played three matches. On 29 December 2019, Endō was called up to the Japan U23 national team for the 2020 AFC U-23 Championship.

He made his international debut for Japan against China national football team on 10 December 2019.

== Career statistics ==
=== Club ===
As of match played 7 November 2020

Appearances and goals by club, season and competition
Club	Season	League			National cup		League cup		Continental		Other		Total	
Club	Season	Division	Apps	Goals	Apps	Goals	Apps	Goals	Apps	Goals	Apps	Goals	Apps	Goals
Yokohama F. Marinos	2016	J1 League	23	0	1	0	5	0	—		0	0	29	0
Yokohama F. Marinos	2017	J1 League	14	1	4	0	4	1	—		0	0	22	2
Yokohama F. Marinos	2018	J1 League	27	2	0	0	9	0	—		0	0	36	2
Yokohama F. Marinos	2019	J1 League	33	7	1	0	6	0	—		0	0	40	7
Yokohama F. Marinos	2020	J1 League	6	2	0	0	0	0	2 (Note: Appearance(s) in AFC Champions League)	1	1 (Note: Appearance in Japanese Super Cup)	0	9	3
Yokohama F. Marinos	Total		103	12	6	0	24	1	2	1	1	0	136	14
Union Berlin (loan)	2020–21	Bundesliga	16	1	1	0	—		—		0	0	17	1
Union Berlin	2021–22	Bundesliga	4	0	0	0	—		—		0	0	4	0
Career total			123	13	7	0	24	1	2	1	1	0	157	16

=== International ===
As of 1 July 2026

Appearances and goals by national team and year
National team	Year	Apps	Goals
Japan	2019	2	0
Total		2	0

== Honours ==
Yokohama F. Marinos

- J1 League: 2019

Japan U19

- AFC U-19 Championship: 2016
