= 2009 Yokohama F. Marinos season =

Yokohama F. Marinos
2009 season
- Manager: Kokichi Kimura
- Stadium: Nissan Stadium
- J.League 1: 10th
- Emperor's Cup: 4th Round
- J.League Cup: Semifinals
- Top goalscorer: Kazuma Watanabe (13)
Home colours	Away colours

2009 Yokohama F. Marinos season

== Competitions ==
Competitions	Position
J.League 1	10th / 18 clubs
Emperor's Cup	4th Round
J.League Cup	Semifinals

== Player statistics ==
No.	Pos.	Player	D.o.B. (Age)	Height / Weight	J.League 1		Emperor's Cup		J.League Cup		Total	
No.	Pos.	Player	D.o.B. (Age)	Height / Weight	Apps	Goals	Apps	Goals	Apps	Goals	Apps	Goals
1	GK	Tetsuya Enomoto	May 2, 1983 (aged 25)	cm / kg	14	0						
3	DF	Naoki Matsuda	March 14, 1977 (aged 31)	cm / kg	31	1						
5	DF	Yūsuke Tanaka	April 14, 1986 (aged 22)	cm / kg	31	1						
6	MF	Ryuji Kawai	July 14, 1978 (aged 30)	cm / kg	11	0						
7	DF	Yuzo Kurihara	September 18, 1983 (aged 25)	cm / kg	26	3						
9	FW	Kazuma Watanabe	August 10, 1986 (aged 22)	cm / kg	34	13						
10	MF	Koji Yamase	September 22, 1981 (aged 27)	cm / kg	28	5						
11	FW	Daisuke Sakata	January 16, 1983 (aged 26)	cm / kg	30	6						
13	DF	Takanobu Komiyama	October 3, 1984 (aged 24)	cm / kg	28	3						
14	MF	Kenta Kano	May 2, 1986 (aged 22)	cm / kg	28	4						
15	DF	Kim Kun-Hoan	August 12, 1986 (aged 22)	cm / kg	28	2						
16	MF	Yukihiro Yamase	April 22, 1984 (aged 24)	cm / kg	0	0						
17	MF	Shingo Hyodo	July 29, 1985 (aged 23)	cm / kg	30	1						
18	FW	Norihisa Shimizu	October 4, 1976 (aged 32)	cm / kg	8	0						
19	FW	Manabu Saito	April 4, 1990 (aged 18)	cm / kg	11	0						
20	MF	Kota Mizunuma	February 22, 1990 (aged 19)	cm / kg	12	0						
21	GK	Hiroki Iikura	June 1, 1986 (aged 22)	cm / kg	19	0						
22	DF	Yuji Nakazawa	February 25, 1978 (aged 31)	cm / kg	32	3						
23	DF	Masakazu Tashiro	June 26, 1988 (aged 20)	cm / kg	5	0						
24	DF	Takashi Kanai	February 5, 1990 (aged 19)	cm / kg	9	0						
26	MF	Fumiya Yamamoto	July 12, 1988 (aged 20)	cm / kg	0	0						
27	FW	Yosuke Saito	April 7, 1988 (aged 20)	cm / kg	0	0						
28	DF	Nobuhisa Urata	September 13, 1989 (aged 19)	cm / kg	0	0						
29	MF	Aria Jasuru Hasegawa	October 29, 1988 (aged 20)	cm / kg	21	0						
30	MF	Shōhei Ogura	September 8, 1985 (aged 23)	cm / kg	26	1						
31	GK	Yota Akimoto	July 11, 1987 (aged 21)	cm / kg	1	0						
32	MF	Kenta Furube	November 30, 1985 (aged 23)	cm / kg	0	0						
33	DF	Daiki Umei	October 5, 1989 (aged 19)	cm / kg	0	0						
34	DF	Jeong Dong-Ho	March 7, 1990 (aged 19)	cm / kg	5	0						
35	DF	Takashi Amano	April 13, 1986 (aged 22)	cm / kg	6	0						
36	GK	Yosuke Abe	May 24, 1990 (aged 18)	cm / kg	0	0						
37	FW	Jin Hanato	May 31, 1990 (aged 18)	cm / kg	0	0						
39	FW	Mike Havenaar	May 20, 1987 (aged 21)	cm / kg	2	0						

== Kits ==
Home	Away	Special

== Other pages ==
- (in Japanese) J.League official site
