= 2010 Yokohama F. Marinos season =

Yokohama F. Marinos
2010 season
- Manager: Kazushi Kimura
- Stadium: Nissan Stadium
- J.League 1: 8th
- Emperor's Cup: 4th Round
- J.League Cup: GL-B 4th
- Top goalscorer: Kazuma Watanabe (8)
Home colours	Away colours

2010 Yokohama F. Marinos season

== Competitions ==
Competitions	Position
J.League 1	8th / 18 clubs
Emperor's Cup	4th Round
J.League Cup	GL-B 4th / 7 clubs

=== J. League 1 ===
Pos	Team	Pld	W	D	L	GF	GA	GD	Pts
6	Shimizu S-Pulse	34	15	9	10	60	49	+11	54
7	Sanfrecce Hiroshima	34	14	9	11	45	38	+7	51
8	Yokohama F. Marinos	34	15	6	13	43	39	+4	51
9	Albirex Niigata	34	12	13	9	48	45	+3	49
10	Urawa Red Diamonds	34	14	6	14	48	41	+7	48

Updated to match(es) played on December 4, 2010. Source: J.League Division 1
Rules for classification: 1) points; 2) goal difference; 3) number of goals scored.

== Player statistics ==
No.	Pos.	Player	D.o.B. (Age)	Height / Weight	J.League 1		Emperor's Cup		J.League Cup		Total	
No.	Pos.	Player	D.o.B. (Age)	Height / Weight	Apps	Goals	Apps	Goals	Apps	Goals	Apps	Goals
1	GK	Tetsuya Enomoto	May 2, 1983 (aged 26)	cm / kg	0	0						
2	DF	Masato Fujita	May 8, 1986 (aged 23)	cm / kg	5	0						
3	DF	Naoki Matsuda	March 14, 1977 (aged 32)	cm / kg	19	1						
4	DF	Yuzo Kurihara	September 18, 1983 (aged 26)	cm / kg	28	2						
5	DF	Yūsuke Tanaka	April 14, 1986 (aged 23)	cm / kg	20	0						
6	MF	Ryuji Kawai	July 14, 1978 (aged 31)	cm / kg	14	1						
7	MF	Shingo Hyodo	July 29, 1985 (aged 24)	cm / kg	32	6						
8	MF	Aria Jasuru Hasegawa	October 29, 1988 (aged 21)	cm / kg	19	2						
9	FW	Kazuma Watanabe	August 10, 1986 (aged 23)	cm / kg	24	8						
10	MF	Koji Yamase	September 22, 1981 (aged 28)	cm / kg	33	5						
11	FW	Daisuke Sakata	January 16, 1983 (aged 27)	cm / kg	20	1						
14	MF	Kenta Kano	May 2, 1986 (aged 23)	cm / kg	20	1						
17	FW	Pablo Bastianini	November 9, 1982 (aged 27)	cm / kg	6	0						
18	FW	Norihisa Shimizu	October 4, 1976 (aged 33)	cm / kg	18	3						
19	FW	Manabu Saito	April 4, 1990 (aged 19)	cm / kg	5	0						
20	MF	Kota Mizunuma	February 22, 1990 (aged 20)	cm / kg	4	0						
21	GK	Hiroki Iikura	June 1, 1986 (aged 23)	cm / kg	34	0						
22	DF	Yuji Nakazawa	February 25, 1978 (aged 32)	cm / kg	22	0						
23	DF	Masakazu Tashiro	June 26, 1988 (aged 21)	cm / kg	0	0						
24	DF	Takashi Kanai	February 5, 1990 (aged 20)	cm / kg	8	0						
25	MF	Shunsuke Nakamura	June 24, 1978 (aged 31)	cm / kg	32	5						
26	MF	Rei Matsumoto	February 25, 1988 (aged 22)	cm / kg	5	0						
27	FW	Yosuke Saito	April 7, 1988 (aged 21)	cm / kg	0	0						
28	DF	Nobuhisa Urata	September 13, 1989 (aged 20)	cm / kg	0	0						
30	MF	Shōhei Ogura	September 8, 1985 (aged 24)	cm / kg	31	0						
31	GK	Yota Akimoto	July 11, 1987 (aged 22)	cm / kg	0	0						
32	DF	Yasuhiro Hato	May 4, 1976 (aged 33)	cm / kg	25	0						
34	DF	Jeong Dong-Ho	March 7, 1990 (aged 19)	cm / kg	0	0						
35	DF	Takashi Amano	April 13, 1986 (aged 23)	cm / kg	21	3						
36	GK	Yosuke Abe	May 24, 1990 (aged 19)	cm / kg	0	0						
37	FW	Jin Hanato	May 31, 1990 (aged 19)	cm / kg	10	1						
40	FW	Yuji Ono	December 22, 1992 (aged 17)	cm / kg	17	3						

== Other pages ==
- (in Japanese) J.League official site
