= Tetsuya Enomoto =

Japanese football player

Tetsuya Enomoto 榎本 哲也
Personal information
- Full name: Tetsuya Enomoto
- Date of birth: May 2, 1983 (age 43)
- Place of birth: Kawasaki, Kanagawa, Japan
- Height: 1.80 m (5 ft 11 in)
- Position: Goalkeeper

Team information
- Current team: Yokohama F. Marinos (assistant goalkeeper coach)

Youth career
- 1999–2001: Yokohama F. Marinos Youth

Senior career*
Years	Team	Apps	(Gls)
2002–2016	Yokohama F. Marinos	238	(0)
2017–2018	Urawa Red Diamonds	0	(0)
2019	Kataller Toyama	27	(0)
Medal record
Yokohama F. Marinos
Winner	J1 League	2003
Winner	J1 League	2004
Runner-up	J1 League	2002
Runner-up	J1 League	2013
Winner	Emperor's Cup	2013
Urawa Reds
Winner	AFC Champions League	2017
Winner	Emperor's Cup	2018
- * Club domestic league appearances and goals as of 1 January 2020

Tetsuya Enomoto (榎本 哲也, Enomoto Tetsuya; born May 2, 1983) is a Japanese former football player. He is currently the assistant goalkeeper coach of J1 League club Yokohama F. Marinos.

== Playing career ==
Enomoto was born in Kawasaki on May 2, 1983. He joined J1 League club Yokohama F. Marinos from youth team in 2002. He debuted in 2003 and battles with Tatsuya Enomoto for the position after the debut. He became a regular goalkeeper since Tatsuya Enomoto left the club end of 2006 season. However his opportunity to play decreased behind Hiroki Iikura from 2009. Enomoto became a regular goalkeeper again in 2013. However his opportunity to play decreased behind Iikura again from 2015.

In 2017, Enomoto moved to Urawa Reds. However he could hardly play in the match behind Shusaku Nishikawa. In 2019, Enomoto moved to J3 League club Kataller Toyama.

== Later career ==
After retiring at the end of 2019, Enomoto was appointed as a goalkeeper coach at Yokohama F. Marinos' Soccer School in February 2020. For the 2021 season, he was appointed goalkeeper coach of Yokohamas professional J1 League team.

== Career statistics ==
As of 1 January 2020.

Club performance			League		Cup		League Cup		Continental		Total	
Season	Club	League	Apps	Goals	Apps	Goals	Apps	Goals	Apps	Goals	Apps	Goals
Japan			League		Emperor's Cup		J.League Cup		Asia		Total	
2002	Yokohama F. Marinos	J1 League	0	0	0	0	0	0	-		0	0
2003	Yokohama F. Marinos	J1 League	15	0	0	0	4	0	-		19	0
2004	Yokohama F. Marinos	J1 League	0	0	1	0	3	0	1	0	5	0
2005	Yokohama F. Marinos	J1 League	23	0	1	0	2	0	4	0	30	0
2006	Yokohama F. Marinos	J1 League	16	0	3	0	5	0	-		24	0
2007	Yokohama F. Marinos	J1 League	33	0	2	0	9	0	-		44	0
2008	Yokohama F. Marinos	J1 League	31	0	4	0	8	0	-		43	0
2009	Yokohama F. Marinos	J1 League	14	0	0	0	4	0	-		18	0
2010	Yokohama F. Marinos	J1 League	0	0	0	0	1	0	-		1	0
2011	Yokohama F. Marinos	J1 League	0	0	1	0	0	0	-		1	0
2012	Yokohama F. Marinos	J1 League	7	0	1	0	0	0	-		8	0
2013	Yokohama F. Marinos	J1 League	33	0	5	0	8	0	-		46	0
2014	Yokohama F. Marinos	J1 League	34	0	0	0	2	0	6	0	42	0
2015	Yokohama F. Marinos	J1 League	9	0	0	0	3	0	-		12	0
2016	Yokohama F. Marinos	J1 League	23	0	3	0	10	0	-		36	0
2017	Urawa Red Diamonds	J1 League	0	0	3	0	0	0	1	0	4	0
2018	Urawa Red Diamonds	J1 League	0	0	0	0	0	0	0	0	0	0
2019	Kataller Toyama	J3 League	27	0	0	0	-		-		27	0
Career total			265	0	24	0	59	0	12	0	360	0

== J.League Firsts ==
- Appearance: March 21, 2003. Yokohama F. Marinos 4 vs 2 Júbilo Iwata, Shizuoka Stadium

== Honours ==
Yokohama F. Marinos

- J1 League: 2003, 2004
- Emperor's Cup: 2013

Urawa Reds

- AFC Champions League: 2017
- Suruga Bank Championship: 2017
