= 2006 Yokohama F. Marinos season =

Yokohama F. Marinos
2006 season
- Manager: Takeshi Okada; Takashi Mizunuma
- Stadium: Nissan Stadium
- J.League 1: 9th
- Emperor's Cup: Quarterfinals
- J.League Cup: Semifinals
- Top goalscorer: Magrão (6); Koji Yamase (6)
- Average home league attendance: 23,663
Home colours	Away colours

2006 Yokohama F. Marinos season

== Competitions ==
Competitions	Position
J.League 1	9th / 18 clubs
Emperor's Cup	Quarterfinals
J.League Cup	Semifinals

== Domestic results ==
=== J.League 1 ===
Match	Date	Venue	Opponents	Score
1	2006..			-
2	2006..			-
3	2006..			-
4	2006..			-
5	2006..			-
6	2006..			-
7	2006..			-
8	2006..			-
9	2006..			-
10	2006..			-
11	2006..			-
12	2006..			-
13	2006..			-
14	2006..			-
15	2006..			-
16	2006..			-
17	2006..			-
18	2006..			-
19	2006..			-
20	2006..			-
21	2006..			-
22	2006..			-
23	2006..			-
24	2006..			-
25	2006..			-
26	2006..			-
27	2006..			-
28	2006..			-
29	2006..			-
30	2006..			-
31	2006..			-
32	2006..			-
33	2006..			-
34	2006..			-

=== Emperor's Cup ===
Match	Date	Venue	Opponents	Score
4th Round	2006..			-
5th Round	2006..			-
Quarterfinals	2006..			-

=== J.League Cup ===
Match	Date	Venue	Opponents	Score
GL-A-1	2006..			-
GL-A-2	2006..			-
GL-A-3	2006..			-
GL-A-4	2006..			-
GL-A-5	2006..			-
GL-A-6	2006..			-
Quarterfinals-1	2006..			-
Quarterfinals-2	2006..			-
Semifinals-1	2006..			-
Semifinals-2	2006..			-

== Player statistics ==
No.	Pos.	Player	D.o.B. (Age)	Height / Weight	J.League 1		Emperor's Cup		J.League Cup		Total	
No.	Pos.	Player	D.o.B. (Age)	Height / Weight	Apps	Goals	Apps	Goals	Apps	Goals	Apps	Goals
1	GK	Tatsuya Enomoto	March 16, 1979 (aged 26)	cm / kg	18	0						
2	DF	Eisuke Nakanishi	June 23, 1973 (aged 32)	cm / kg	3	0						
3	DF	Naoki Matsuda	March 14, 1977 (aged 28)	cm / kg	29	4						
4	MF	Daisuke Nasu	October 10, 1981 (aged 24)	cm / kg	16	1						
5	DF	Dutra	August 11, 1973 (aged 32)	cm / kg	28	2						
6	MF	Yoshiharu Ueno	April 21, 1973 (aged 32)	cm / kg	25	0						
7	DF	Hayuma Tanaka	July 31, 1982 (aged 23)	cm / kg	34	5						
8	MF	Magrão	December 20, 1978 (aged 27)	cm / kg	17	6						
9	FW	Tatsuhiko Kubo	June 18, 1976 (aged 29)	cm / kg	29	5						
10	MF	Koji Yamase	September 22, 1981 (aged 24)	cm / kg	20	6						
11	FW	Daisuke Sakata	January 16, 1983 (aged 23)	cm / kg	19	4						
13	MF	Takashi Hirano	July 15, 1974 (aged 31)	cm / kg	9	0						
14	MF	Daisuke Oku	February 7, 1976 (aged 30)	cm / kg	15	2						
15	FW	Hideo Ōshima	March 7, 1980 (aged 25)	cm / kg	25	4						
17	FW	Takayuki Yoshida	March 14, 1977 (aged 28)	cm / kg	27	1						
18	FW	Norihisa Shimizu	October 4, 1976 (aged 29)	cm / kg	11	2						
19	FW	Marques	February 12, 1973 (aged 33)	cm / kg	19	2						
20	FW	Mike Havenaar	May 20, 1987 (aged 18)	cm / kg	9	0						
21	GK	Tetsuya Enomoto	May 2, 1983 (aged 22)	cm / kg	16	0						
22	DF	Yuji Nakazawa	February 25, 1978 (aged 28)	cm / kg	23	1						
23	MF	Shinya Tanoue	February 5, 1980 (aged 26)	cm / kg	0	0						
24	MF	Taketo Shiokawa	December 17, 1977 (aged 28)	cm / kg	3	0						
25	MF	Yuji Goto	August 20, 1985 (aged 20)	cm / kg	0	0						
26	DF	Yūsuke Tanaka	April 14, 1986 (aged 19)	cm / kg	2	0						
28	DF	Takashi Amano	April 13, 1986 (aged 19)	cm / kg	0	0						
29	MF	Kenta Kano	May 2, 1986 (aged 19)	cm / kg	13	1						
30	DF	Yuzo Kurihara	September 18, 1983 (aged 22)	cm / kg	30	1						
31	GK	Kenichi Shimokawa	May 14, 1970 (aged 35)	cm / kg	0	0						
32	MF	Yukihiro Yamase	April 22, 1984 (aged 21)	cm / kg	6	0						
35	MF	Ryuji Kawai	July 14, 1978 (aged 27)	cm / kg	25	1						
36	GK	Yota Akimoto	July 11, 1987 (aged 18)	cm / kg	0	0						
37	DF	Takanobu Komiyama	October 3, 1984 (aged 21)	cm / kg	1	0						

== Other pages ==
- (in Japanese) J.League official site
