= 2011 Yokohama F. Marinos season =

Yokohama F. Marinos
2011 season
- Chairman: Akira Kaetsu
- Manager: Kazushi Kimura
- J. League Division 1: 5th
- Emperor's Cup: Semi-finals
- J. League Cup: Quarter-finals
Home colours	Away colours

The 2011 Yokohama F. Marinos season was Yokohama F. Marinos's 19th season in J. League Division 1 and 32nd season overall in the top flight (counting the Japan Soccer League and participation in the inaugural J. League Cup). It also includes the 2011 J. League Cup and 2011 Emperor's Cup.

== Squad ==
As of March 7, 2011 Note: Flags indicate national team as defined under FIFA eligibility rules; some limited exceptions apply. Players may hold more than one non-FIFA nationality.

No.	Pos.	Nation	Player
1	GK	(Japan) JPN	Tetsuya Enomoto (captain)
2	DF	(Japan) JPN	Takashi Amano
4	DF	(Japan) JPN	Yuzo Kurihara
5	DF	(South Korea) KOR	Kim Kun-Hoan
6	MF	(Japan) JPN	Shōhei Ogura
7	MF	(Japan) JPN	Shingō Hyōdō (vice-captain)
8	MF	(Japan) JPN	Aria Jasuru Hasegawa
9	FW	(Japan) JPN	Kazuma Watanabe
10	FW	(Japan) JPN	Yuji Ono
11	FW	(Japan) JPN	Masashi Oguro
13	DF	(Japan) JPN	Yuzo Kobayashi (vice-captain)
14	MF	(Japan) JPN	Kenta Kano
15	FW	(Japan) JPN	Jin Hanato

No.	Pos.	Nation	Player
16	DF	(Japan) JPN	Eijiro Takeda
18	MF	(Japan) JPN	Rei Matsumoto
19	MF	(Japan) JPN	Kentaro Moriya (vice-captain)
20	DF	(Japan) JPN	Yasuhiro Hato
21	GK	(Japan) JPN	Hiroki Iikura (vice-captain)
22	DF	(Japan) JPN	Yuji Nakazawa
23	MF	(Japan) JPN	Sho Matsumoto (captain)
24	DF	(Japan) JPN	Takashi Kanai
25	MF	(Japan) JPN	Shunsuke Nakamura (captain)
26	DF	(Japan) JPN	Naoaki Aoyama
29	MF	(Japan) JPN	Hiroyuki Taniguchi
31	GK	(Japan) JPN	Yota Akimoto

=== Pre-season friendly ===
20 February 2011	Shimizu S-Pulse (Japan)	2–1	(Japan) Yokohama F. Marinos	Numazu, Shizuoka
14:03 GMT+09:03	Ota 10'; Omae 78'		Watanabe 23'	Stadium: Shizuoka Ashitaka Stadium; Attendance: 7,104; Referee: Kazuyuki Hayakawa

=== J. League ===
==== League table ====
Pos	Team	Pld	W	D	L	GF	GA	GD	Pts	Qualification or relegation
3	Gamba Osaka	34	21	7	6	78	51	+27	70	Qualification for 2012 AFC Champions League group stage (Note: League champions also qualified for the 2011 FIFA Club World Cup play-off stage.; The winners of the 2011 Emperor's Cup, FC Tokyo, which played in the 2011 J.League Division 2, also qualified for the group stage of the 2012 AFC Champions League.)
4	Vegalta Sendai	34	14	14	6	39	25	+14	56	
5	Yokohama F. Marinos	34	16	8	10	46	40	+6	56	
6	Kashima Antlers	34	13	11	10	53	40	+13	50	
7	Sanfrecce Hiroshima	34	14	8	12	52	49	+3	50	

Updated to match(es) played on December 3, 2011. Source: J.League Division 1
Rules for classification: 1st points; 2nd goal differential; 3rd goals scored; 4th head-to-head results; 5th disciplinary points; 6th draw. If two clubs are tied for first place, both clubs will be declared.

==== Matches ====
5 March 2011 Round 1	Nagoya Grampus	1–1	Yokohama F. Marinos	Toyota Stadium
Saturday 14:00	Kennedy 90+5'	Report	63' Hyodo	Attendance: 27,153; Referee: Minoru Tojo

=== Emperor's Cup ===
2011-10-12 Second round	Yokohama F. Marinos	3–1	Kamatamare Sanuki	Nippatsu Mitsuzawa Stadium, Yokohama
19:00	Hyodo 86'; Taniguchi 88'; Oguro 90+3'	Report	Ishida 78'	Attendance: 2,905; Referee: Nobutsugu Murakami

2011-11-16 Third round	Yokohama F. Marinos	3–0	Tochigi SC	Nippatsu Mitsuzawa Stadium, Yokohama
13:00	Oguro 33', 80'; Nakamura 90+4'	Report		Attendance: 3,951; Referee: Hajime Matsuo

2011-12-17 Fourth round	Yokohama F. Marinos	4–0	Matsumoto Yamaga	Toyama Athletic Stadium, Toyama
13:00	Ono 28', 73', 75'; Nakamura 87'	Report		Attendance: 10,120; Referee: Yudai Yamamoto

2011-12-24 Quarter-finals	Nagoya Grampus	0–0 (a.e.t.) (3–4 p)	Yokohama F. Marinos	Mizuho Athletic Stadium, Nagoya
13:00		Report		Attendance: 8,728; Referee: Junpei Iida
	Penalties
	Fujimoto (penalty scored); Isomura (penalty scored); Ogawa (penalty scored); Yoshimura (penalty missed); Córdoba (penalty missed)		(penalty scored) Nakamura; (penalty scored) Kurihara; (penalty scored) Kobayashi; (penalty scored) Kanai

2011-12-29 Semi-finals	Yokohama F. Marinos	2–4 (a.e.t.)	Kyoto Sanga	National Olympic Stadium, Shinjuku
15:00	Watanabe 42'; Nakazawa 90+5'	Report	Kudo 50'; Dutra 72'; Kubo 116'; Komai 120'	Attendance: 14,467; Referee: Ryuji Sato
