= Norihisa Shimizu =

Japanese footballer

Norihisa Shimizu 清水 範久
Personal information
- Full name: Norihisa Shimizu
- Date of birth: October 4, 1976 (age 50)
- Place of birth: Takasaki, Gunma, Japan
- Height: 1.70 m (5 ft 7 in)
- Positions: Midfielder; forward

Youth career
- 1992–1994: Maebashi Commercial High School

Senior career*
Years	Team	Apps	(Gls)
1995–2001	Júbilo Iwata	63	(9)
2000	→Consadole Sapporo (loan)	7	(0)
2002–2010	Yokohama F. Marinos	141	(11)
2011	Avispa Fukuoka	5	(0)
Total		216	(20)
Medal record
Júbilo Iwata
Winner	J1 League	1997
Winner	J1 League	1999
Runner-up	J1 League	1998
Runner-up	J1 League	2001
Winner	J.League Cup	1998
Runner-up	J.League Cup	1997
Runner-up	J.League Cup	2001
Yokohama F. Marinos
Winner	J1 League	2003
Winner	J1 League	2004
Runner-up	J1 League	2002
- * Club domestic league appearances and goals

Norihisa Shimizu (清水 範久, Shimizu Norihisa; born October 4, 1976) is a former Japanese football player.

== Playing career ==
Shimizu was born in Takasaki on October 4, 1976. After graduating from high school, he joined Júbilo Iwata in 1995. He played many matches as offensive midfielder and forward from 1997. The club won the champions 1997, 1999 J1 League and 1998 J.League Cup. In Asia, the club won the champions 1998–99 Asian Club Championship and the 2nd place 1999–2000 Asian Club Championship. In September 2000, he moved to J2 League club Consadole Sapporo on loan. In 2001, he returned to Júbilo Iwata. In late 2001, he became a regular player instead Naohiro Takahara moved to Boca Juniors. In 2002, he moved to Yokohama F. Marinos. In 2002, he played as regular player as forward. From 2003, although his opportunity to play decreased, he played many matches as substitute and the club won the champions for 2 years in a row (2003-2004). In 2011, he moved to Avispa Fukuoka. However he could hardly play in the match and retired end of 2011 season.

== Club statistics ==
Club performance			League		Cup		League Cup		Continental		Total	
Season	Club	League	Apps	Goals	Apps	Goals	Apps	Goals	Apps	Goals	Apps	Goals
Japan			League		Emperor's Cup		League Cup		Asia		Total	
1995	Júbilo Iwata	J1 League	0	0	0	0	-		-		0	0
1996	Júbilo Iwata	J1 League	0	0	1	0	1	0	-		2	0
1997	Júbilo Iwata	J1 League	19	1	4	1	11	2	-		34	4
1998	Júbilo Iwata	J1 League	4	1	0	0	4	2	-		8	3
1999	Júbilo Iwata	J1 League	17	1	2	0	4	0	-		23	1
2000	Júbilo Iwata	J1 League	7	1	0	0	2	0	-		9	1
2000	Consadole Sapporo	J2 League	7	0	1	1	0	0	-		8	1
2001	Júbilo Iwata	J1 League	16	5	2	0	6	2	-		24	7
2002	Yokohama F. Marinos	J1 League	26	2	1	1	6	0	-		33	3
2003	Yokohama F. Marinos	J1 League	21	2	3	1	6	0	-		30	3
2004	Yokohama F. Marinos	J1 League	14	1	0	0	4	1	3	1	21	3
2005	Yokohama F. Marinos	J1 League	12	0	1	0	4	1	3	0	20	1
2006	Yokohama F. Marinos	J1 League	11	2	1	0	5	0	-		17	2
2007	Yokohama F. Marinos	J1 League	12	1	2	1	6	0	-		20	2
2008	Yokohama F. Marinos	J1 League	19	0	3	0	6	0	-		28	0
2009	Yokohama F. Marinos	J1 League	8	0	1	0	2	0	-		11	0
2010	Yokohama F. Marinos	J1 League	18	3	2	0	5	0	-		25	3
2011	Avispa Fukuoka	J1 League	5	0	0	0	1	0	-		6	0
Career total			216	20	24	5	73	8	6	1	319	34

== J1 League Firsts ==
- Appearance: April 16, 1997. Júbilo Iwata 1 vs 0 Avispa Fukuoka, Hakatanomori Football Stadium
- Goal: August 16, 1997. Júbilo Iwata 2 vs 1 Vissel Kobe, Yamaha Stadium
