= Naoki Matsuda =

Japanese footballer (1977–2011)

Naoki Matsuda 松田 直樹
- Matsuda with Japan in 2002

Personal information
- Date of birth: 14 March 1977
- Place of birth: Kiryu, Gunma, Japan
- Date of death: 4 August 2011 (aged 34)
- Place of death: Matsumoto, Nagano, Japan
- Height: 1.83 m (6 ft 0 in)
- Position: Centre-back

Youth career
- 1992–1994: Maebashi Ikuei High School

Senior career*
Years	Team	Apps	(Gls)
1995–2010	Yokohama F. Marinos	385	(17)
2011	Matsumoto Yamaga FC	15	(1)
Total		400	(18)

International career
1993	Japan U-17	4	(1)
1995	Japan U-20	4	(0)
1996–2000	Japan U-23	5	(0)
2000–2005	Japan	40	(1)
Medal record
Men's football
Representing Japan
AFC Asian Cup
Winner	2000 Lebanon
Winner	2004 China
FIFA Confederations Cup
Runner-up	2001 Korea/Japan
- * Club domestic league appearances and goals

Naoki Matsuda (松田 直樹, Matsuda Naoki; 14 March 1977 – 4 August 2011) was a Japanese professional footballer who played as a central defender for the Japan national team.

== Club career ==
Matsuda was born in Kiryu on 14 March 1977. After graduating from high school, he joined Yokohama Marinos (later Yokohama F. Marinos) in 1995. From first season, he became a regular player and played as right back of three defence with Japan national team players Masami Ihara and Norio Omura. The club won the champions in 1995 J1 League. In 2000s, he mainly played as centre back with Yuji Nakazawa or Yuzo Kurihara, also played defensive midfielder. The club won the champions 2001 J.League Cup, 2003 and 2004 J1 League. Although he played as central player of Marinos in 16 seasons, he was sacked end of 2010 season.

Matsuda moved to Japan Football League club Matsumoto Yamaga FC in 2011. Although he played for qualify for promote to J2 League, in 2 August, he collapsed for myocardial infarction during training. On 4 August, he died at the age of 34. His last match against Honda on 23 July was his 400th game in the league. At the end of the season, the club won promotion to the J2 League.

== International career ==
In August 1993, Matsuda was selected Japan U-17 national team for 1993 U-17 World Championship. He played full-time in all 4 matches and scored 1 goal. In April 1995, he was also selected Japan U-20 national team for 1995 World Youth Championship and he played full-time in all 4 matches.

In July 1996, Matsuda was selected Japan U-23 national team for 1996 Summer Olympics and he played full-time in all 3 matches. Although Japan won 2 matches, Japan lost at First round. At this time, Japan won Brazil in first game. It was known as "Miracle of Miami" (マイアミの奇跡) in Japan.

On 5 February 2000, Matsuda debuted for Japan national team against Mexico. After the debut, he played many matches as one of three backs defense. In September, he was selected U-23 Japan for 2000 Summer Olympics 2nd time. However he played only 2 matches instead Koji Nakata got injured in the third game.

In October 2000, Matsuda was selected Japan for 2000 Asian Cup. He played 3 matches and Japan won the champions. In 2001, he was also selected Japan for 2001 Confederations Cup. He played 4 matches and Japan won the 2nd place. At 2002 World Cup, he played full-time in all 4 matches. After 2002 World Cup, he did not play in many matches. He was selected Japan for 2004 Asian Cup. Although Japan won the champions, he played only 5 minutes. On 29 January 2005, he played and scored a goal against Kazakhstan. Although this goal is his first goal for Japan, this game became his last game for Japan. He played 40 games and scored 1 goal for Japan until 2005.

== Death ==
On 2 August 2011, Matsuda collapsed during training with Matsumoto Yamaga FC due to a cardiac arrest after finishing a 15-minute warmup run, and doctors diagnosed his condition as "extremely severe". Two days later, he died at the age of 34.

Despite having released him in 2010, his former club, Yokohama F. Marinos, retired his uniform number 3 after his death, as an indication of his contribution not only to F. Marinos but to Japan football's development, both at league and international levels.

The funeral was held on 9 August 2011 and attendees included players who once played for Japan and Yokohama F. Marinos.

== Career statistics ==
=== Club ===
Appearances and goals by club, season and competition
Club	Season	League			Emperor's Cup		J.League Cup		Asia		Total	
Club	Season	Division	Apps	Goals	Apps	Goals	Apps	Goals	Apps	Goals	Apps	Goals
Yokohama F. Marinos (Note: "Yokohama Marinos" until 1999)	1995	J1 League	33	1	1	0	–		–		34	1
Yokohama F. Marinos	1996	J1 League	16	0	1	0	11	2	–		28	2
Yokohama F. Marinos	1997	J1 League	31	2	2	0	6	0	–		39	2
Yokohama F. Marinos	1998	J1 League	12	0	1	0	4	1	–		17	1
Yokohama F. Marinos	1999	J1 League	27	0	3	0	2	0	–		32	0
Yokohama F. Marinos	2000	J1 League	24	2	2	1	3	0	–		29	3
Yokohama F. Marinos	2001	J1 League	29	0	1	0	9	0	–		39	0
Yokohama F. Marinos	2002	J1 League	25	2	1	0	0	0	–		26	2
Yokohama F. Marinos	2003	J1 League	20	0	0	0	5	0	–		25	0
Yokohama F. Marinos	2004	J1 League	24	1	1	0	4	0	4	0	33	1
Yokohama F. Marinos	2005	J1 League	27	1	1	0	4	1	4	0	36	2
Yokohama F. Marinos	2006	J1 League	29	4	0	0	9	3	–		38	7
Yokohama F. Marinos	2007	J1 League	8	1	2	0	5	0	–		15	1
Yokohama F. Marinos	2008	J1 League	30	1	3	0	7	0	–		40	1
Yokohama F. Marinos	2009	J1 League	31	1	3	0	10	2	–		44	3
Yokohama F. Marinos	2010	J1 League	19	1	2	0	3	0	–		24	1
Matsumoto Yamaga FC	2011	Japan Football League	15	1	–		–		–		15	1
Career total			400	18	24	1	82	9	8	0	506	28

=== International ===
Appearances and goals by national team and year
National team	Year	Apps	Goals
Japan	2000	14	0
Japan	2001	10	0
Japan	2002	12	0
Japan	2003	0	0
Japan	2004	3	0
Japan	2005	1	1
Total		40	1

Scores and results list Japan's goal tally first, score column indicates score after each Matsuda goal.

List of international goals scored by Naoki Matsuda
No.	Date	Venue	Opponent	Score	Result	Competition
1	29 January 2005	Yokohama, Japan	Kazakhstan		4–0	Friendly

== Honours ==
Yokohama F. Marinos

- J1 League: 1995, 2003, 2004
- J.League Cup: 2001

Japan

- FIFA Confederations Cup: Runner-up 2001
- AFC Asian Cup: 2000, 2004

Individual

- J.League Best XI: 2000, 2002
- J.League 20th Anniversary Team
- J.League 30th Anniversary Team
