= 2018 Yokohama F. Marinos season =

Yokohama F. Marinos
2018 season
- Manager: Ange Postecoglou
- Stadium: Nissan Stadium
- J1 League: 12th
Home colours	Away colours

2018 Yokohama F. Marinos season. At the end of the season, they finished 12th, the lowest league finish since 2001.

== Squad ==
As of 2019.

Note: Flags indicate national team as defined under FIFA eligibility rules; some limited exceptions apply. Players may hold more than one non-FIFA nationality.

No.	Pos.	Nation	Player
1	GK	KOR	Park Iru-gyu
2	DF	SRB	Dušan Cvetinović
4	DF	JPN	Yuzo Kurihara
5	DF	THA	Theerathon Bunmathan (on loan from Muangthong United)
6	MF	JPN	Takahiro Ogihara
7	MF	JPN	Yūki Ōtsu
8	MF	JPN	Takuya Kida
9	FW	BRA	Marcos Júnior
11	MF	JPN	Keita Endo
13	DF	BRA	Thiago Martins (on loan from Palmeiras)
15	DF	JPN	Makito Ito
16	DF	JPN	Ryo Takano
17	FW	BRA	Erik (on loan from Palmeiras)
18	DF	JPN	Rikuto Hirose
19	MF	JPN	Kazaki Nakagawa

No.	Pos.	Nation	Player
20	FW	JPN	Tadanari Lee
23	FW	JPN	Teruhito Nakagawa
26	MF	JPN	Kota Watanabe
27	DF	JPN	Ken Matsubara
28	FW	BRA	Mateus (on loan from Nagoya)
30	FW	BRA	Edigar Junio (on loan from Bahia)
31	GK	JPN	Daichi Sugimoto
33	DF	JPN	Takuya Wada (on loan from Sanfrecce Hiroshima)
34	GK	JPN	Hirotsugu Nakabayashi (on loan from Sanfrecce Hiroshima)
38	FW	JPN	Yushi Yamaya
44	DF	JPN	Shinnosuke Hatanaka
49	MF	JPN	Jin Izumisawa

The official club website lists the club mascot as player #0 and the supporters as player #12.

=== Out on loan ===
Note: Flags indicate national team as defined under FIFA eligibility rules; some limited exceptions apply. Players may hold more than one non-FIFA nationality.

No.	Pos.	Nation	Player
40	MF	JPN	Naoki Tsubaki (to Giravanz Kitakyushu)
14	MF	JPN	Kota Yamada (to Nagoya Grampus)
10	MF	JPN	Jun Amano (to Lokeren)
17	MF	KOR	Yun Il-lok (to Jeju United)
29	FW	JPN	Masashi Wada (to Blaublitz Akita)
32	GK	JPN	Gaku Harada (to SC Sagamihara)
34	DF	JPN	Taiga Nishiyama (to ReinMeer Aomori)

No.	Pos.	Nation	Player
35	MF	JPN	Kaina Yoshio (to Vegalta Sendai)
36	DF	JPN	Jin Ikoma (to Giravanz Kitakyushu)
37	MF	JPN	Kenta Hori (to Blaublitz Akita)
39	FW	JPN	Shuto Machino (to Giravanz Kitakyushu)

== J1 League ==
Match	Date	Team	Score	Team	Venue	Attendance
1	2018.02.25	Cerezo Osaka	1–1	Yokohama F. Marinos	Yanmar Stadium Nagai	23,049
2	2018.03.02	Kashiwa Reysol	2–0	Yokohama F. Marinos	Sankyo Frontier Kashiwa Stadium	10,659
3	2018.03.10	Yokohama F. Marinos	1–2	Sagan Tosu	NHK Spring Mitsuzawa Football Stadium	11,247
4	2018.03.18	Urawa Reds	0–1	Yokohama F. Marinos	Saitama Stadium 2002	33,168
5	2018.03.31	Shimizu S-Pulse	0–1	Yokohama F. Marinos	IAI Stadium Nihondaira	17,032
6	2018.04.08	Yokohama F. Marinos	1–1	Kawasaki Frontale	Nissan Stadium	37,332
7	2018.04.11	Sanfrecce Hiroshima	3–1	Yokohama F. Marinos	Edion Stadium Hiroshima	7,344
8	2018.04.15	Yokohama F. Marinos	1–2	Vissel Kobe	Nissan Stadium	16,313
9	2018.04.21	Yokohama F. Marinos	4–4	Shonan Bellmare	Nissan Stadium	19,117
10	2018.04.25	Hokkaido Consadole Sapporo	2–1	Yokohama F. Marinos	Sapporo Atsubetsu Stadium	6,729
11	2018.04.28	Yokohama F. Marinos	3–0	Kashima Antlers	Nissan Stadium	27,348
12	2018.05.02	Yokohama F. Marinos	1–3	Júbilo Iwata	Nissan Stadium	19,738
13	2018.05.05	Nagoya Grampus	1–1	Yokohama F. Marinos	Toyota Stadium	38,280
14	2018.05.12	Yokohama F. Marinos	1–1	Gamba Osaka	Nissan Stadium	21,576
15	2018.05.19	Yokohama F. Marinos	5–2	V-Varen Nagasaki	Nissan Stadium	17,379
16	2018.07.18	Vegalta Sendai	2–8	Yokohama F. Marinos	Yurtec Stadium Sendai	13,081
17	2018.07.22	FC Tokyo	5–2	Yokohama F. Marinos	Ajinomoto Stadium	34,126
19	2018.08.01	Yokohama F. Marinos	1–4	Sanfrecce Hiroshima	NHK Spring Mitsuzawa Football Stadium	10,069
20	2018.08.05	Kawasaki Frontale	2–0	Yokohama F. Marinos	Kawasaki Todoroki Stadium	23,033
21	2018.08.11	Shonan Bellmare	0–1	Yokohama F. Marinos	Shonan BMW Stadium Hiratsuka	14,862
22	2018.08.15	Yokohama F. Marinos	1–2	Nagoya Grampus	Nissan Stadium	24,527
23	2018.08.19	Kashima Antlers	1–0	Yokohama F. Marinos	Kashima Soccer Stadium	21,178
24	2018.08.26	Vissel Kobe	0–2	Yokohama F. Marinos	Noevir Stadium Kobe	25,541
18	2018.08.29	Yokohama F. Marinos	1–2	Shimizu S-Pulse	Nissan Stadium	15,645
25	2018.09.01	Yokohama F. Marinos	3–1	Kashiwa Reysol	Nissan Stadium	22,752
26	2018.09.16	Yokohama F. Marinos	1–2	Urawa Reds	Nissan Stadium	41,686
27	2018.09.22	Júbilo Iwata	1–2	Yokohama F. Marinos	Yamaha Stadium	13,451
28	2018.09.29	Yokohama F. Marinos	5–2	Vegalta Sendai	NHK Spring Mitsuzawa Football Stadium	8,688
29	2018.10.05	Yokohama F. Marinos	2–1	Hokkaido Consadole Sapporo	Nissan Stadium	19,124
30	2018.10.20	Gamba Osaka	2–1	Yokohama F. Marinos	Panasonic Stadium Suita	26,630
31	2018.11.03	Yokohama F. Marinos	0–1	FC Tokyo	Nissan Stadium	27,252
32	2018.11.10	V-Varen Nagasaki	0–1	Yokohama F. Marinos	Transcosmos Stadium Nagasaki	13,226
33	2018.11.24	Sagan Tosu	2–1	Yokohama F. Marinos	Best Amenity Stadium	19,187
34	2018.12.01	Yokohama F. Marinos	1–2	Cerezo Osaka	Nissan Stadium	30,608
