= Hideo Ōshima =

Japanese footballer

Hideo Oshima 大島 秀夫
Personal information
- Full name: Hideo Oshima
- Date of birth: March 7, 1980 (age 46)
- Place of birth: Isesaki, Gunma, Japan
- Height: 1.84 m (6 ft 1/2 in)
- Position: Forward

Youth career
- 1995–1997: Maebashi Ikuei High School

Senior career*
Years	Team	Apps	(Gls)
1998	Yokohama Flügels	6	(0)
1999–2000	Kyoto Purple Sanga	4	(0)
2001–2004	Montedio Yamagata	166	(49)
2005–2008	Yokohama F. Marinos	112	(34)
2009–2011	Albirex Niigata	66	(8)
2011	JEF United Chiba	9	(3)
2012	Consadole Sapporo	20	(0)
2013–2016	Giravanz Kitakyushu	111	(4)
Total		494	(98)

Managerial career
- 2017–2021: Yokohama F. Marinos U18 (youth coach)
- 2020–2025: Yokohama F. Marinos (assistant)
- 2025–2026: Yokohama F. Marinos
Medal record
Yokohama Flügels
Winner	Emperor's Cup	1998
- * Club domestic league appearances and goals

Hideo Oshima (大島 秀夫, Ōshima Hideo; born March 7, 1980) is a Japanese football manager and former footballer who is the manager of J1 League club Yokohama F. Marinos.

== Playing career ==
Oshima was born in Isesaki on March 7, 1980. After graduating from high school, he joined J1 League club Yokohama Flügels in 1998. Although he played several matches as forward, the club was disbanded end of 1998 season due to financial strain. In 1999, he moved to Kyoto Purple Sanga with contemporaries Yasuhito Endo, Kazuki Teshima so on. However he could hardly play in the match. In 2001, he moved to J2 League club Montedio Yamagata. He became a regular player and played many matches until 2004. In 2004, he scored 22 goals and became a top scorer of J2 League in Japanese player.

In 2005, he moved to Yokohama F. Marinos. He played many matches and he became a regular forward in 2007. In 2007, he scored 14 goals and became a top scorer of J1 League in Japanese player in 2007. However, his opportunity to play decreased in late 2008 and he was released from the club end of 2008 season. In 2009, he moved to Albirex Niigata. Although he could not score many goals, he played as regular player until 2010. However his opportunity to play decreased in 2011. In August 2011, he moved to J2 club JEF United Chiba. In 2012, he moved to Consadole Sapporo. Although he played many matches as substitute, the club was relegated to J2. In 2013, he moved to J2 club Giravanz Kitakyushu. He played many matches as a substitute until 2015. In 2016, his opportunity to play decreased and the club finished at bottom place and was relegated J3 League end of 2016 season. He retired by the end of 2016 season.

== Coaching career ==
In June 2025, Ōshima was appointed head coach of Yokohama F. Marinos, who were sitting at the bottom of the 2025 J1 League standings at the time.

== Club statistics ==
Club performance			League		Cup		League Cup		Continental		Total	
Season	Club	League	Apps	Goals	Apps	Goals	Apps	Goals	Apps	Goals	Apps	Goals
Japan			League		Emperor's Cup		J.League Cup		Asia		Total	
1998	Yokohama Flügels	J1 League	6	0	1	0	0	0	-		7	0
Total			6	0	1	0	0	0	-		7	0
1999	Kyoto Purple Sanga	J1 League	4	0	0	0	3	0	-		7	0
2000	Kyoto Purple Sanga	J1 League	0	0	0	0	1	0	-		1	0
Total			4	0	0	0	4	0	-		8	0
2001	Montedio Yamagata	J2 League	43	12	3	0	2	0	-		48	12
2002	Montedio Yamagata	J2 League	38	6	1	0	-		-		39	6
2003	Montedio Yamagata	J2 League	42	9	3	3	-		-		45	12
2004	Montedio Yamagata	J2 League	43	22	1	1	-		-		44	23
Total			166	49	8	4	2	0	-		176	53
2005	Yokohama F. Marinos	J1 League	28	9	0	0	3	0	5	1	36	10
2006	Yokohama F. Marinos	J1 League	25	4	3	0	8	0	-		36	4
2007	Yokohama F. Marinos	J1 League	30	14	2	2	9	4	-		41	20
2008	Yokohama F. Marinos	J1 League	29	7	2	0	8	0	-		39	7
Total			112	34	7	2	28	4	5	1	152	41
2009	Albirex Niigata	J1 League	33	4	4	1	6	0	-		43	5
2010	Albirex Niigata	J1 League	28	4	3	0	5	0	-		36	4
2011	Albirex Niigata	J1 League	5	0	0	0	0	0	-		5	4
Total			66	8	7	1	11	0	-		84	9
2011	JEF United Chiba	J2 League	9	3	0	0	-		-		9	3
Total			9	3	0	0	-		-		9	3
2012	Consadole Sapporo	J1 League	20	0	0	0	5	1	-		25	1
Total			20	0	0	0	5	1	-		25	1
2013	Giravanz Kitakyushu	J2 League	35	3	1	0	-		-		36	3
2014	Giravanz Kitakyushu	J2 League	33	1	3	0	-		-		36	1
2015	Giravanz Kitakyushu	J2 League	32	0	1	0	-		-		33	0
2016	Giravanz Kitakyushu	J2 League	11	0	1	0	-		-		12	0
Total			111	4	6	0	-		-		117	4
Career total			494	98	29	7	50	5	5	1	578	111

== Managerial statistics ==
As of 30 June 2026

Managerial record by team and tenure
Team	Nat.	From	To	Record								Ref.
Team	Nat.	From	To	G	W	D	L	GF	GA	GD	Win %	Ref.
Yokohama F. Marinos	(Japan)	24 June 2025	30 June 2026	40	16	5	19	61	54	+7	40.00	
Career Total				40	16	5	19	61	54	+7	40.00	

== J.League Firsts ==
- Appearance: March 21, 1998. Yokohama Flügels 2 vs 1 Yokohama Marinos, International Stadium Yokohama
- Goal: March 10, 2001. Kyoto Purple Sanga 2 vs 2 Montedio Yamagata, Nishikyogoku Athletic Stadium
