= Eren Taşkin =

German-Azerbaijani footballer

Personal information
- Date of birth: 26 August 1992 (age 34)
- Place of birth: Duisburg, Germany
- Height: 1.80 m (5 ft 11 in)
- Position: Attacking midfielder

Youth career
- 1998–2003: MSV Duisburg
- 2003–2006: Schalke 04
- 2006–2009: Rot-Weiss Essen
- 2009–2011: Schalke 04

Senior career*
Years	Team	Apps	(Gls)
2011–2012	Schalke 04 II	13	(0)
2012–2013	MSV Duisburg II	28	(6)
2013–2014	Fortuna Düsseldorf II	30	(8)
2013–2014	Fortuna Düsseldorf	1	(0)
2014–2016	Wattenscheid 09	56	(7)
2016–2017	Fatih Karagümrük	27	(7)
2017–2018	Etimesgut Belediyespor	16	(0)
2019	Wattenscheid 09	9	(1)
2019–2020	Eyüpspor	23	(4)
2020	Kahramanmaraşspor	7	(0)
2021–2022	Kırşehir FK	9	(1)
2022	Sportfreunde Baumberg		
2023–2024	SF Hamborn 07	29	(2)
- * Club domestic league appearances and goals as of 05:22, 4 July 2024 (UTC)

Eren Taşkin (born 26 August 1992) is a German footballer who most recently played as an attacking midfielder for SF Hamborn 07. He made his 2. Bundesliga debut for Fortuna Düsseldorf on 22 December 2013 in a 2–3 home defeat against 1. FC Köln.
