= Markus Krösche =

German Sporting director and former player (born 1980)

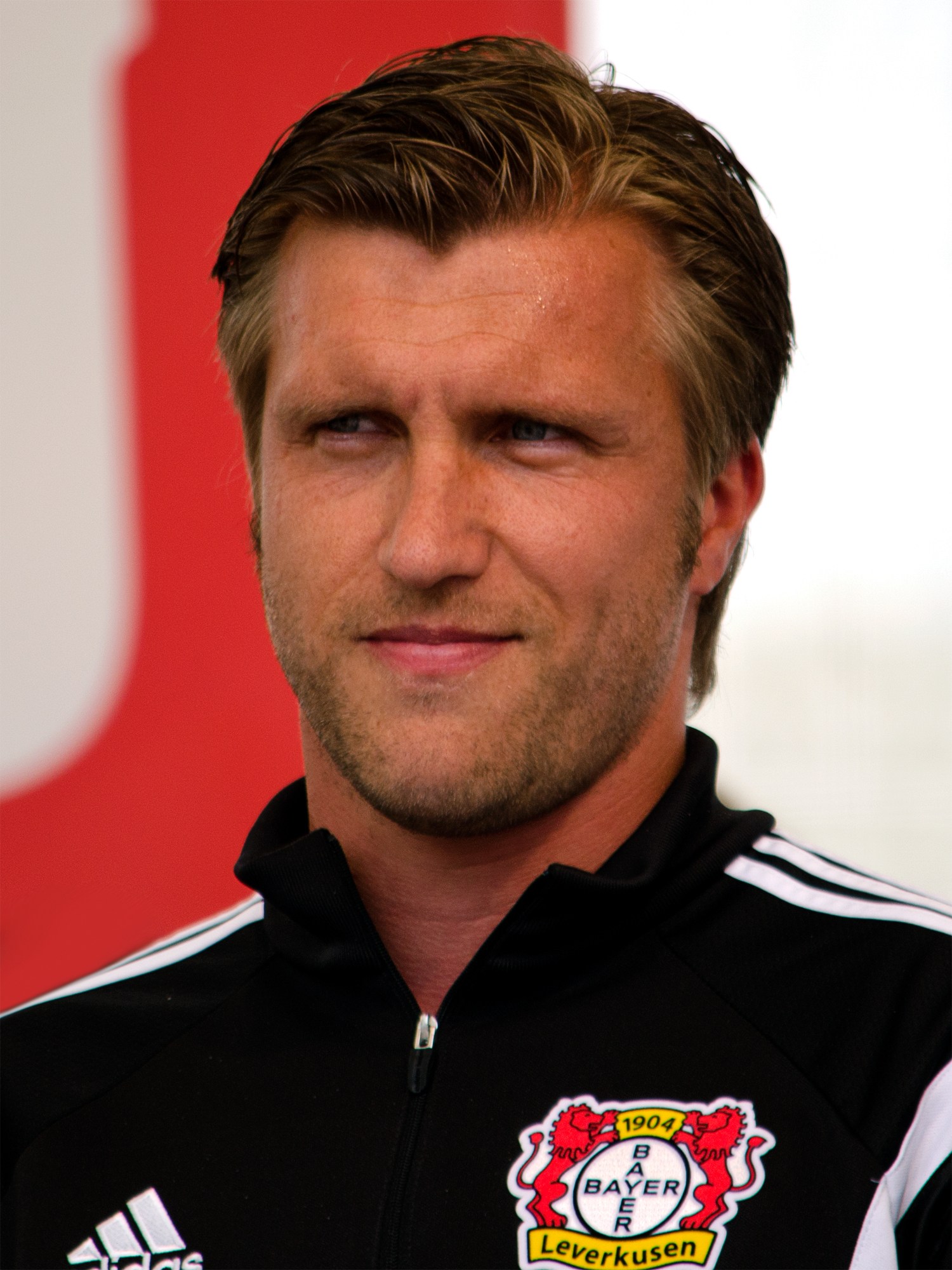
- Krösche in 2015

Personal information
- Date of birth: 17 September 1980 (age 46)
- Place of birth: Hanover, West Germany
- Height: 1.80 m (5 ft 11 in)
- Position: Defensive midfielder

Youth career
- –1996: Sportfreunde Ricklingen
- 1996–1998: Werder Bremen

Senior career*
Years	Team	Apps	(Gls)
1998–2001	Werder Bremen II	55	(3)
2001–2014	SC Paderborn	356	(15)
Total		411	(18)

International career
2000	Germany U21	1	(0)

Managerial career
- 2014–2015: SC Paderborn II (head coach)
- 2015–2017: Bayer Leverkusen (assistant)
- 2017–2019: SC Paderborn (sports director)
- 2019–2021: RB Leipzig (sporting director)
- 2021–2026: Eintracht Frankfurt (sporting director)
- * Club domestic league appearances and goals

Markus Krösche (born 17 September 1980) is a German former professional footballer, he used to plays as a defensive midfielder and represented Germany at youth level internationally. Krösche followed his retirement by working as head coach for the reserve team of SC Padeborn (2014–15) and as sports director for the first-team (2017–19), assistant coach for Bayer Leverkusen (2015–17), leading up to sporting director of RB Leipzig (2019–21) and Eintracht Frankfurt (2021–26).

== Club career ==
Markus Krösche, who won the German A youth championship as team captain in 1999 with Werder Bremen, switched to the 2001–02 season from Bremen's amateurs to regional league rivals SC Padeborn, with whom he finished second in the 2004–05 season, equal on points with champions Eintracht Braunschweig, managed to get promoted from the Regionalliga Nord to the 2. Bundesliga. In 2008, as the longest-serving player, he extended his contract with SCP by a further four years until 2012. He took over the position of team captain from René Müller after he left the club after Paderborn was relegated to the 3rd division. In the 2008–09 season, Krösche made an immediate return to the 2. Bundesliga with Paderborn. After extending his contract again in 2011, Krösche ended his career as a professional soccer player in the summer of 2014. In his last season, Paderborn was promoted to the Bundesliga for the first time in 2013–14, to which he contributed with 18 appearances and two goals.

Krösche played 192 times for SC Paderborn in the 2nd Bundesliga and 162 times in the third divisions. This makes him the record player of SCP 07 and its predecessor clubs in professional football. In 2007, Krösche was elected to the SC Paderborn's eleven of the century.

== Managerial/executive career ==
In the 2014–15 season, Krösche became the head coach of SC Paderborn II. He later joined Roger Schmidt as assistant coach for two years at Bayer Leverkusen. In mid-March 2017, he became sports director of SC Paderborn, where the club managed to promote from the 3. Liga to Bundesliga during his tenure.

Bundesliga club RB Leipzig appointed Krösche to be their sporting director on 1 July 2019. He filled a vacancy opened by the departure of Ralf Rangnick and in April 2021, he became the sporting director of Eintracht Frankfurt. On 18 October 2026, Krösche was released from his duties at Eintracht Frankfurt with immediate effect at his own request. His contract, which ran until 30 June 2028, remained in force under amended terms.
