= Gaku Harada =

Japanese footballer

Gaku Harada 原田 岳
Personal information
- Full name: Gaku Harada
- Date of birth: 22 May 1998 (age 28)
- Place of birth: Iwate, Japan
- Height: 1.88 m (6 ft 2 in)
- Position: Goalkeeper

Team information
- Current team: Kataller Toyama
- Number: 99

Youth career
- 2008–2010: Yokohama Buddy SC
- 2011–2016: Yokohama F. Marinos

Senior career*
Years	Team	Apps	(Gls)
2017–2021	Yokohama F. Marinos	0	(0)
2019–2020	→ SC Sagamihara (loan)	6	(0)
2021	→ V-Varen Nagasaki (loan)	0	(0)
2022–2026	V-Varen Nagasaki	26	(0)
2026	→ Kataller Toyama (loan)	6	(0)
2026–	Kataller Toyama	0	(0)

International career^{‡}
2013	Japan U15		
2014	Japan U16		
- * Club domestic league appearances and goals as of 16 August 2026 ‡ National team caps and goals as of 13 July 2021, 17:04 (UTC)

Gaku Harada (原田 岳, Harada Gaku; born 22 May 1998) is a Japanese footballer who plays as a goalkeeper for Kataller Toyama.

== Career ==
On 25 October 2016, it was announced that Harada would be promoted to the first team from the 2017 season. During the 2017 season, he didn't play a single league match, spending most of his time practicing.

Harada made his debut for Sagamihara against Iwate Grulla Morioka.

== Career statistics ==
=== Club ===
As of the start 2025 season.

Club	Season	League			National Cup		League Cup		Other		Total	
Club	Season	Division	Apps	Goals	Apps	Goals	Apps	Goals	Apps	Goals	Apps	Goals
Yokohama F. Marinos	2017	J1 League	0	0	0	0	0	0	0	0	0	0
Yokohama F. Marinos	2018	J1 League	0	0	0	0	0	0	0	0	0	0
Yokohama F. Marinos	2019	J1 League	0	0	0	0	0	0	0	0	0	0
Yokohama F. Marinos	2020	J1 League	0	0	0	0	0	0	0	0	0	0
Yokohama F. Marinos	2021	J1 League	0	0	0	0	0	0	0	0	0	0
Yokohama F. Marinos	Total		0	0	0	0	0	0	0	0	0	0
SC Sagamihara (loan)	2019	J3 League	6	0	0	0	–		0	0	6	0
SC Sagamihara (loan)	2020	J3 League	0	0	0	0	–		0	0	0	0
SC Sagamihara (loan)	Total		6	0	0	0	0	0	0	0	6	0
V-Varen Nagasaki (loan)	2021	J2 League	0	0	0	0	0	0	0	0	0	0
V-Varen Nagasaki	2022	J2 League	1	0	3	0	0	0	0	0	4	0
V-Varen Nagasaki	2023	J2 League	0	0	1	0	0	0	0	0	1	0
V-Varen Nagasaki	2024	J2 League	22	0	2	0	1	0	0	0	25	0
V-Varen Nagasaki	2025	J2 League	0	0	0	0	0	0	0	0	0	0
V-Varen Nagasaki	Total		23	0	6	0	1	0	0	0	30	0
Career total			29	0	6	0	1	0	0	0	36	0
