= 2015 Yokohama F. Marinos season =

Yokohama F. Marinos
2015 season
- Manager: Erick Mombaerts
- Stadium: Nissan Stadium
- J1 League: 7th
Home colours	Away colours

2015 Yokohama F. Marinos season.

== J1 League ==
=== League table ===
Pos	Team	Pld	W	D	L	GF	GA	GD	Pts
6	Kawasaki Frontale	34	17	6	11	62	48	+14	57
7	Yokohama F. Marinos	34	15	10	9	45	32	+13	55
8	Shonan Bellmare	34	13	9	12	40	44	−4	48

Updated to match(es) played on 28 November 2015. Source: Meiji Yasuda J1 League Standings
Rules for classification: 1) Points; 2) Goal difference; 3) Goals scored

=== Match details ===
J1 League match details
Match	Date	Team	Score	Team	Venue	Attendance
1-1	2015.03.07	Yokohama F. Marinos	1-3	Kawasaki Frontale	Nissan Stadium	38,123
1-2	2015.03.14	FC Tokyo	0-0	Yokohama F. Marinos	Ajinomoto Stadium	30,492
1-3	2015.03.22	Yokohama F. Marinos	1-0	Sagan Tosu	NHK Spring Mitsuzawa Football Stadium	13,529
1-4	2015.04.04	Kashiwa Reysol	1-2	Yokohama F. Marinos	Hitachi Kashiwa Stadium	12,378
1-5	2015.04.12	Yokohama F. Marinos	1-1	Vegalta Sendai	Nissan Stadium	20,207
1-6	2015.04.18	Urawa Reds	2-1	Yokohama F. Marinos	Saitama Stadium 2002	33,793
1-7	2015.04.25	Yokohama F. Marinos	3-0	Shonan Bellmare	Nissan Stadium	20,388
1-8	2015.04.29	Yokohama F. Marinos	1-2	Sanfrecce Hiroshima	Nissan Stadium	19,284
1-9	2015.05.02	Montedio Yamagata	1-0	Yokohama F. Marinos	ND Soft Stadium Yamagata	12,188
1-10	2015.05.06	Yokohama F. Marinos	2-0	Nagoya Grampus	Nissan Stadium	22,514
1-11	2015.05.10	Yokohama F. Marinos	1-0	Albirex Niigata	Nissan Stadium	19,784
1-12	2015.05.16	Shimizu S-Pulse	1-2	Yokohama F. Marinos	IAI Stadium Nihondaira	12,978
1-13	2015.05.23	Matsumoto Yamaga FC	0-3	Yokohama F. Marinos	Matsumotodaira Park Stadium	18,906
1-14	2015.05.30	Yokohama F. Marinos	1-1	Gamba Osaka	Nissan Stadium	35,044
1-15	2015.06.07	Ventforet Kofu	1-1	Yokohama F. Marinos	Yamanashi Chuo Bank Stadium	13,007
1-16	2015.06.20	Yokohama F. Marinos	0-3	Kashima Antlers	Nissan Stadium	28,928
1-17	2015.06.27	Vissel Kobe	1-1	Yokohama F. Marinos	Noevir Stadium Kobe	22,332
2-1	2015.07.11	Yokohama F. Marinos	1-1	Montedio Yamagata	Nissan Stadium	20,575
2-2	2015.07.15	Yokohama F. Marinos	0-1	Kashiwa Reysol	NHK Spring Mitsuzawa Football Stadium	8,038
2-3	2015.07.19	Gamba Osaka	2-2	Yokohama F. Marinos	Expo '70 Commemorative Stadium	16,787
2-4	2015.07.25	Sanfrecce Hiroshima	2-0	Yokohama F. Marinos	Edion Stadium Hiroshima	15,174
2-5	2015.07.29	Yokohama F. Marinos	1-2	Shimizu S-Pulse	Nissan Stadium	14,848
2-6	2015.08.12	Nagoya Grampus	0-3	Yokohama F. Marinos	Paloma Mizuho Stadium	17,093
2-7	2015.08.16	Yokohama F. Marinos	2-0	Ventforet Kofu	Nissan Stadium	19,207
2-8	2015.08.22	Sagan Tosu	1-2	Yokohama F. Marinos	Best Amenity Stadium	18,321
2-9	2015.08.29	Yokohama F. Marinos	4-0	Urawa Reds	Nissan Stadium	33,467
2-10	2015.09.12	Albirex Niigata	1-1	Yokohama F. Marinos	Denka Big Swan Stadium	25,336
2-11	2015.09.19	Yokohama F. Marinos	1-0	FC Tokyo	Nissan Stadium	30,999
2-12	2015.09.26	Shonan Bellmare	1-1	Yokohama F. Marinos	Shonan BMW Stadium Hiratsuka	14,046
2-13	2015.10.03	Vegalta Sendai	1-3	Yokohama F. Marinos	Yurtec Stadium Sendai	15,685
2-14	2015.10.17	Yokohama F. Marinos	2-1	Vissel Kobe	Nissan Stadium	22,598
2-15	2015.10.24	Kawasaki Frontale	0-1	Yokohama F. Marinos	Kawasaki Todoroki Stadium	23,701
2-16	2015.11.07	Kashima Antlers	2-0	Yokohama F. Marinos	Kashima Soccer Stadium	22,755
2-17	2015.11.22	Yokohama F. Marinos	0-0	Matsumoto Yamaga FC	Nissan Stadium	44,226
