= Taku Ishihara =

Japanese footballer

Personal information
- Full name: Taku Ishihara
- Date of birth: October 3, 1992 (age 34)
- Place of birth: Aichi, Japan
- Height: 1.77 m (5 ft 9 1/2 in)
- Position: Midfielder

Youth career
- 2009–2012: Chukyo University

Senior career*
Years	Team	Apps	(Gls)
2007–2008	Yokohama F. Marinos	0	(0)
2008	Tokushima Vortis	1	(0)
2013	Mladost Podgorica	14	(0)
2013	Erzgebirge Aue	7	(1)
2014	Saarbrücken	14	(2)
2014–2015	Neustrelitz	6	(0)
Total		42	(3)
- * Club domestic league appearances and goals

Taku Ishihara (石原 卓, Ishihara Taku; born October 3, 1992) is a former Japanese football player.

He had previously played for the J2 League team Tokushima Vortis.

Ishihira is a midfielder who plays an attacking role from the wings with left-footed shots and crosses. He dominates the left side with his technique and good physical strength.

In July 2014, he was loaned to fourth tier Regionalliga Nordost club TSG Neustrelitz for the upcoming season.

== Career statistics ==
Appearances and goals by club, season and competition
Club	Season	League			Emperor's Cup		J.League Cup		Total	
Club	Season	Division	Apps	Goals	Apps	Goals	Apps	Goals	Apps	Goals
Yokohama F. Marinos	2007	J1 League	0	0	0	0	0	0	0	0
Yokohama F. Marinos	2008	J1 League	0	0	0	0	0	0	0	0
Tokushima Vortis	2008	J2 League	1	0	0	0	—		1	0
Career total			1	0	0	0	0	0	1	0
