= 2017 Yokohama F. Marinos season =

Yokohama F. Marinos
2017 season
- Manager: Erick Mombaerts
- Stadium: Nissan Stadium
- J1 League: 5th
| Home colours | Away colours |

2017 Yokohama F. Marinos season.

== J1 League ==
=== League table ===
| Pos | Team | Pld | W | D | L | GF | GA | GD | Pts | Qualification or relegation |
|---|---|---|---|---|---|---|---|---|---|---|
| 3 | Cerezo Osaka | 34 | 19 | 6 | 9 | 65 | 43 | +22 | 63 | Champions League group stage |
| 4 | Kashiwa Reysol | 34 | 18 | 8 | 8 | 49 | 33 | +16 | 62 | Champions League play-off round (Note: The winner of the 2017 Emperor's Cup qualified for the group stage of the 2018 AFC Champions League. Since the Emperor's Cup winner Cerezo Osaka had already qualified for the AFC Champions League, the play-off round spot was awarded to the fourth-placed team.) |
| 5 | Yokohama F. Marinos | 34 | 17 | 8 | 9 | 45 | 36 | +9 | 59 | |
| 6 | Júbilo Iwata | 34 | 16 | 10 | 8 | 50 | 30 | +20 | 58 | |
| 7 | Urawa Red Diamonds | 34 | 14 | 7 | 13 | 64 | 54 | +10 | 49 | |

Source: Meiji Yasuda J1 League
Rules for classification: 1) Points; 2) Goal difference; 3) Goals scored

=== Match details ===
J1 League match details
| Match | Date | Team | Score | Team | Venue | Attendance |
|---|---|---|---|---|---|---|
| 1 | 2017.02.25 | Yokohama F. Marinos | 3–2 | Urawa Reds | Nissan Stadium | 39,284 |
| 2 | 2017.03.04 | Yokohama F. Marinos | 3–0 | Hokkaido Consadole Sapporo | NHK Spring Mitsuzawa Football Stadium | 12,740 |
| 3 | 2017.03.10 | Kashima Antlers | 1–0 | Yokohama F. Marinos | Kashima Soccer Stadium | 12,537 |
| 4 | 2017.03.18 | Yokohama F. Marinos | 1–1 | Albirex Niigata | Nissan Stadium | 20,191 |
| 5 | 2017.04.01 | Cerezo Osaka | 2–0 | Yokohama F. Marinos | Kincho Stadium | 14,455 |
| 6 | 2017.04.08 | Yokohama F. Marinos | 2–1 | Júbilo Iwata | Nissan Stadium | 38,803 |
| 7 | 2017.04.16 | Sanfrecce Hiroshima | 0–1 | Yokohama F. Marinos | Edion Stadium Hiroshima | 12,651 |
| 8 | 2017.04.22 | Kashiwa Reysol | 2–0 | Yokohama F. Marinos | Hitachi Kashiwa Stadium | 10,268 |
| 9 | 2017.04.30 | Yokohama F. Marinos | 0–1 | Gamba Osaka | Nissan Stadium | 31,808 |
| 10 | 2017.05.07 | Sagan Tosu | 1–0 | Yokohama F. Marinos | Best Amenity Stadium | 21,245 |
| 11 | 2017.05.14 | Yokohama F. Marinos | 1–0 | Ventforet Kofu | NHK Spring Mitsuzawa Football Stadium | 11,036 |
| 12 | 2017.05.20 | Yokohama F. Marinos | 1–1 | Vegalta Sendai | Nissan Stadium | 16,758 |
| 13 | 2017.05.27 | Shimizu S-Pulse | 1–3 | Yokohama F. Marinos | IAI Stadium Nihondaira | 12,865 |
| 14 | 2017.06.04 | Yokohama F. Marinos | 2–0 | Kawasaki Frontale | Nissan Stadium | 42,483 |
| 15 | 2017.06.18 | FC Tokyo | 0–1 | Yokohama F. Marinos | Ajinomoto Stadium | 23,282 |
| 16 | 2017.06.25 | Yokohama F. Marinos | 2–0 | Vissel Kobe | Nissan Stadium | 16,673 |
| 17 | 2017.07.01 | Omiya Ardija | 1–2 | Yokohama F. Marinos | NACK5 Stadium Omiya | 11,448 |
| 18 | 2017.07.08 | Yokohama F. Marinos | 1–1 | Sanfrecce Hiroshima | Nissan Stadium | 23,517 |
| 19 | 2017.07.29 | Yokohama F. Marinos | 2–2 | Shimizu S-Pulse | Nissan Stadium | 24,881 |
| 20 | 2017.08.05 | Albirex Niigata | 0–2 | Yokohama F. Marinos | Denka Big Swan Stadium | 24,137 |
| 21 | 2017.08.09 | Hokkaido Consadole Sapporo | 0–2 | Yokohama F. Marinos | Sapporo Dome | 17,350 |
| 22 | 2017.08.13 | Yokohama F. Marinos | 1–0 | Sagan Tosu | NHK Spring Mitsuzawa Football Stadium | 12,764 |
| 23 | 2017.08.20 | Vissel Kobe | 0–0 | Yokohama F. Marinos | Noevir Stadium Kobe | 19,987 |
| 24 | 2017.08.26 | Yokohama F. Marinos | 1–0 | FC Tokyo | Nissan Stadium | 24,707 |
| 25 | 2017.09.09 | Kawasaki Frontale | 3–0 | Yokohama F. Marinos | Kawasaki Todoroki Stadium | 24,715 |
| 26 | 2017.09.16 | Yokohama F. Marinos | 1–1 | Kashiwa Reysol | Nissan Stadium | 20,844 |
| 27 | 2017.09.23 | Ventforet Kofu | 3–2 | Yokohama F. Marinos | Yamanashi Chuo Bank Stadium | 12,049 |
| 28 | 2017.09.30 | Gamba Osaka | 1–2 | Yokohama F. Marinos | Suita City Football Stadium | 23,071 |
| 29 | 2017.10.14 | Yokohama F. Marinos | 1–1 | Omiya Ardija | Nissan Stadium | 20,670 |
| 30 | 2017.10.21 | Yokohama F. Marinos | 3–2 | Kashima Antlers | Nissan Stadium | 29,716 |
| 31 | 2017.10.29 | Júbilo Iwata | 2–1 | Yokohama F. Marinos | Shizuoka Stadium | 19,525 |
| 32 | 2017.11.18 | Yokohama F. Marinos | 1–4 | Cerezo Osaka | Nissan Stadium | 34,153 |
| 33 | 2017.11.26 | Vegalta Sendai | 2–2 | Yokohama F. Marinos | Yurtec Stadium Sendai | 18,059 |
| 34 | 2017.12.02 | Urawa Reds | 0–1 | Yokohama F. Marinos | Saitama Stadium 2002 | 41,618 |
