= 2013 Yokohama F. Marinos season =

Yokohama F. Marinos
2013 season
- Manager: Yasuhiro Higuchi
- Stadium: Nissan Stadium
- J1 League: 2nd
| Home colours | Away colours |

2013 Yokohama F. Marinos season.

== J1 League ==
| Match | Date | Team | Score | Team | Venue | Attendance |
|---|---|---|---|---|---|---|
| 1 | 2013.03.02 | Yokohama F. Marinos | 4-2 | Shonan Bellmare | Nissan Stadium | 24,298 |
| 2 | 2013.03.09 | Shimizu S-Pulse | 0-5 | Yokohama F. Marinos | IAI Stadium Nihondaira | 16,487 |
| 3 | 2013.03.16 | Yokohama F. Marinos | 2-1 | Júbilo Iwata | Nissan Stadium | 19,195 |
| 4 | 2013.03.30 | Yokohama F. Marinos | 3-2 | FC Tokyo | Nissan Stadium | 23,698 |
| 5 | 2013.04.06 | Sanfrecce Hiroshima | 1-3 | Yokohama F. Marinos | Edion Stadium Hiroshima | 10,554 |
| 6 | 2013.04.13 | Yokohama F. Marinos | 2-1 | Kawasaki Frontale | Nissan Stadium | 27,204 |
| 7 | 2013.04.20 | Albirex Niigata | 1-0 | Yokohama F. Marinos | Tohoku Denryoku Big Swan Stadium | 21,415 |
| 8 | 2013.04.27 | Yokohama F. Marinos | 1-1 | Ventforet Kofu | Nissan Stadium | 24,149 |
| 9 | 2013.05.03 | Yokohama F. Marinos | 1-1 | Kashima Antlers | Nissan Stadium | 40,034 |
| 10 | 2013.05.06 | Kashiwa Reysol | 2-1 | Yokohama F. Marinos | Hitachi Kashiwa Stadium | 13,621 |
| 11 | 2013.05.11 | Nagoya Grampus | 1-2 | Yokohama F. Marinos | Toyota Stadium | 18,512 |
| 12 | 2013.05.18 | Yokohama F. Marinos | 0-0 | Vegalta Sendai | Nissan Stadium | 23,083 |
| 13 | 2013.05.25 | Sagan Tosu | 0-1 | Yokohama F. Marinos | Best Amenity Stadium | 13,197 |
| 14 | 2013.07.06 | Yokohama F. Marinos | 1-1 | Oita Trinita | NHK Spring Mitsuzawa Football Stadium | 12,537 |
| 15 | 2013.07.10 | Cerezo Osaka | 2-1 | Yokohama F. Marinos | Kincho Stadium | 13,272 |
| 16 | 2013.07.13 | Yokohama F. Marinos | 2-1 | Omiya Ardija | Nissan Stadium | 29,722 |
| 17 | 2013.07.17 | Urawa Reds | 2-3 | Yokohama F. Marinos | Saitama Stadium 2002 | 23,725 |
| 18 | 2013.07.31 | Yokohama F. Marinos | 1-1 | Kashiwa Reysol | Nissan Stadium | 20,294 |
| 19 | 2013.08.03 | Shonan Bellmare | 1-2 | Yokohama F. Marinos | Shonan BMW Stadium Hiratsuka | 13,786 |
| 20 | 2013.08.10 | Yokohama F. Marinos | 2-1 | Sagan Tosu | NHK Spring Mitsuzawa Football Stadium | 13,427 |
| 21 | 2013.08.17 | FC Tokyo | 0-2 | Yokohama F. Marinos | Ajinomoto Stadium | 30,698 |
| 22 | 2013.08.24 | Kashima Antlers | 2-1 | Yokohama F. Marinos | Kashima Soccer Stadium | 17,608 |
| 23 | 2013.08.28 | Yokohama F. Marinos | 3-0 | Urawa Reds | Nissan Stadium | 30,481 |
| 24 | 2013.08.31 | Omiya Ardija | 1-0 | Yokohama F. Marinos | NACK5 Stadium Omiya | 12,932 |
| 25 | 2013.09.14 | Yokohama F. Marinos | 1-1 | Cerezo Osaka | Nissan Stadium | 35,528 |
| 26 | 2013.09.21 | Yokohama F. Marinos | 1-0 | Shimizu S-Pulse | NHK Spring Mitsuzawa Football Stadium | 13,416 |
| 27 | 2013.09.28 | Vegalta Sendai | 0-0 | Yokohama F. Marinos | Yurtec Stadium Sendai | 17,849 |
| 28 | 2013.10.05 | Ventforet Kofu | 0-0 | Yokohama F. Marinos | Yamanashi Chuo Bank Stadium | 12,547 |
| 29 | 2013.10.19 | Yokohama F. Marinos | 1-0 | Sanfrecce Hiroshima | Nissan Stadium | 39,243 |
| 30 | 2013.10.27 | Oita Trinita | 0-1 | Yokohama F. Marinos | Oita Bank Dome | 12,913 |
| 31 | 2013.11.10 | Yokohama F. Marinos | 1-2 | Nagoya Grampus | Nissan Stadium | 28,484 |
| 32 | 2013.11.23 | Júbilo Iwata | 0-1 | Yokohama F. Marinos | Yamaha Stadium | 13,790 |
| 33 | 2013.11.30 | Yokohama F. Marinos | 0-2 | Albirex Niigata | Nissan Stadium | 62,632 |
| 34 | 2013.12.07 | Kawasaki Frontale | 1-0 | Yokohama F. Marinos | Kawasaki Todoroki Stadium | 20,151 |
