= 2016 Yokohama F. Marinos season =

Yokohama F. Marinos
2016 season
- Manager: Erick Mombaerts
- Stadium: Nissan Stadium
- J1 League: 10th
Home colours	Away colours

2016 Yokohama F. Marinos season.

== J1 League ==
=== League table ===
Pos	Team	Pld	W	D	L	GF	GA	GD	Pts
9	FC Tokyo	34	15	7	12	39	39	0	52
10	Yokohama F. Marinos	34	13	12	9	53	38	+15	51
11	Sagan Tosu	34	12	10	12	36	37	−1	46

Source: Meiji Yasuda J1 League
Rules for classification: 1) Points; 2) Goal difference; 3) Goals scored.

=== Match details ===
J1 League match details
Match	Date	Team	Score	Team	Venue	Attendance
1–1	2016.02.27	Yokohama F. Marinos	0–1	Vegalta Sendai	Nissan Stadium	24,898
1–2	2016.03.05	Avispa Fukuoka	1–1	Yokohama F. Marinos	Level5 Stadium	16,968
1–3	2016.03.12	Albirex Niigata	1–2	Yokohama F. Marinos	Denka Big Swan Stadium	20,771
1–4	2016.03.19	Yokohama F. Marinos	2–1	Sagan Tosu	NHK Spring Mitsuzawa Football Stadium	10,436
1–5	2016.04.02	Gamba Osaka	1–2	Yokohama F. Marinos	Suita City Football Stadium	34,231
1–6	2016.04.10	Yokohama F. Marinos	0–0	Urawa Reds	Nissan Stadium	38,382
1–7	2016.04.16	Júbilo Iwata	1–5	Yokohama F. Marinos	Yamaha Stadium	14,385
1–8	2016.04.24	Yokohama F. Marinos	1–2	Sanfrecce Hiroshima	Nissan Stadium	25,106
1–9	2016.04.30	Yokohama F. Marinos	0–1	Shonan Bellmare	Nissan Stadium	26,518
1–10	2016.05.04	Nagoya Grampus	3–1	Yokohama F. Marinos	Toyota Stadium	27,669
1–11	2016.05.08	Yokohama F. Marinos	2–2	Ventforet Kofu	Nissan Stadium	18,021
1–12	2016.05.14	Kashima Antlers	1–0	Yokohama F. Marinos	Kashima Soccer Stadium	20,177
1–13	2016.05.21	Vissel Kobe	0–1	Yokohama F. Marinos	Noevir Stadium Kobe	15,895
1–14	2016.05.29	Yokohama F. Marinos	3–0	Kashiwa Reysol	Nissan Stadium	20,554
1–15	2016.06.11	Yokohama F. Marinos	0–2	Kawasaki Frontale	Nissan Stadium	46,413
1–16	2016.06.18	Omiya Ardija	1–1	Yokohama F. Marinos	NACK5 Stadium Omiya	12,510
1–17	2016.06.25	Yokohama F. Marinos	0–1	FC Tokyo	Nissan Stadium	21,240
2–1	2016.07.02	Shonan Bellmare	0–3	Yokohama F. Marinos	Shonan BMW Stadium Hiratsuka	13,677
2–2	2016.07.09	Yokohama F. Marinos	3–0	Avispa Fukuoka	Nissan Stadium	19,052
2–3	2016.07.13	Yokohama F. Marinos	3–2	Vissel Kobe	NHK Spring Mitsuzawa Football Stadium	7,033
2–4	2016.07.17	Sanfrecce Hiroshima	2–2	Yokohama F. Marinos	Edion Stadium Hiroshima	25,845
2–5	2016.07.23	Yokohama F. Marinos	1–1	Júbilo Iwata	Nissan Stadium	23,028
2–6	2016.07.30	Yokohama F. Marinos	0–0	Nagoya Grampus	Nissan Stadium	25,772
2–7	2016.08.06	Kashiwa Reysol	1–2	Yokohama F. Marinos	Hitachi Kashiwa Stadium	12,170
2–8	2016.08.13	Yokohama F. Marinos	1–1	Omiya Ardija	NHK Spring Mitsuzawa Football Stadium	13,009
2–9	2016.08.20	FC Tokyo	1–0	Yokohama F. Marinos	Ajinomoto Stadium	27,880
2–10	2016.08.27	Yokohama F. Marinos	2–2	Kashima Antlers	Nissan Stadium	29,123
2–11	2016.09.10	Vegalta Sendai	0–1	Yokohama F. Marinos	Yurtec Stadium Sendai	16,668
2–12	2016.09.17	Yokohama F. Marinos	3–1	Albirex Niigata	Nissan Stadium	21,107
2–13	2016.09.25	Kawasaki Frontale	3–2	Yokohama F. Marinos	Kawasaki Todoroki Stadium	25,017
2–14	2016.10.01	Ventforet Kofu	0–4	Yokohama F. Marinos	Yamanashi Chuo Bank Stadium	11,650
2–15	2016.10.22	Yokohama F. Marinos	2–2	Gamba Osaka	Nissan Stadium	38,380
2–16	2016.10.29	Sagan Tosu	2–2	Yokohama F. Marinos	Best Amenity Stadium	16,676
2–17	2016.11.03	Urawa Reds	1–1	Yokohama F. Marinos	Saitama Stadium 2002	56,841
