= Ariajasuru Hasegawa =

Japanese footballer

Ariajasuru Hasegawa 長谷川 アーリアジャスール
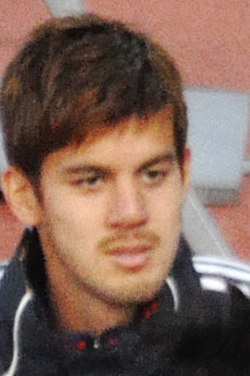

Personal information
- Full name: Ariajasuru Hasegawa
- Date of birth: 29 October 1988 (age 38)
- Place of birth: Tsurugashima, Saitama, Japan
- Height: 1.86 m (6 ft 1 in)
- Position: Attacking midfielder

Youth career
- 2001–2003: Sakado Diplomats
- 2004–2006: Yokohama F. Marinos

Senior career*
| Years | Team | Apps | (Gls) |
| 2007–2011 | Yokohama F. Marinos | 73 | (4) |
| 2012–2013 | FC Tokyo | 60 | (8) |
| 2014–2015 | Cerezo Osaka | 49 | (4) |
| 2015–2016 | Zaragoza | 8 | (0) |
| 2016 | Shonan Bellmare | 24 | (1) |
| 2017 | Omiya Ardija | 16 | (0) |
| 2018–2020 | Nagoya Grampus | 30 | (1) |
| 2021–2022 | Machida Zelvia | 78 | (11) |
| 2023–2024 | Gainare Tottori | 33 | (3) |

International career
| 2006–2010 | Japan U20 | 3 | (1) |
- * Club domestic league appearances and goals as of 27 October 2024, 7:45 (UTC)

Ariajasuru Hasegawa (Japanese: 長谷川 アーリアジャスール, romanized: Hasegawa Āriajasūru; Persian: آریا جسور; born 29 October 1988) is a Japanese former professional footballer who played as an attacking midfielder.

== Club career ==
Born in Tsurugashima, Saitama, Hasegawa joined Yokohama F. Marinos' youth setup in 2004, aged 16, after starting it out at Sakado Diplomats. In November 2006 he was promoted to the main squad ahead of the following campaign and made his professional debut on 3 March 2007, in a 1–0 home win against Ventforet Kofu; however, he struggled severely with injuries during the year.

On 6 June 2008, Hasegawa signed a professional deal with Marinos, and scored his first senior goal on 29 November, netting the last in a 2–0 home success against Tokyo Verdy. During the 2010 season he was also used as a forward, but mainly as a substitute.

On 6 January 2012, Hasegawa moved to fellow league team FC Tokyo. He was mainly used as a defensive midfielder by manager Ranko Popović and scored five goals in 2013; on 29 December 2013 he extended his contract with the club.

On 16 January 2014, Hasegawa joined Cerezo Osaka, reuniting with former manager Popović. He appeared in 30 matches for the side during his first season, scoring once.

On 2 July 2015, Hasegawa moved abroad for the first time in his career, signing a one-year deal with Real Zaragoza and working with Popović for the third time.

On 29 March 2016, Hasegawa returned to Japan and play for Shonan Bellmare.

On 29 December 2017, Hasegawa signed for Nagoya Grampus.

== International career ==
Hasegawa represented Japan in the under-20 level between 2006 and 2010, being capped three times and scoring one goal. In December 2012 he got called up to the main squad by coach Alberto Zaccheroni for a friendly against Azerbaijan, but remained unused in the 2–0 win.

Born to a Japanese mother and an Iranian father, Hasegawa is eligible to play for Japan or Iran, though Japan does not recognize dual citizenship.

== Personal life ==
He was born to a Japanese mother and an Iranian father.

== Career statistics ==
=== Club ===
As of match played 27 October 2024

Appearances and goals by club, season and competition
| Club | Season | League | | | National Cup | | League Cup | | Continental | | Other | | Total | |
| Club | Season | Division | Apps | Goals | Apps | Goals | Apps | Goals | Apps | Goals | Apps | Goals | Apps | Goals |
|---|---|---|---|---|---|---|---|---|---|---|---|---|---|---|
| Yokohama F. Marinos | 2007 | J. League Div 1 | 2 | 0 | 0 | 0 | 0 | 0 | — | | — | | 2 | 0 |
| Yokohama F. Marinos | 2008 | J. League Div 1 | 8 | 1 | 3 | 0 | 4 | 0 | — | | — | | 15 | 1 |
| Yokohama F. Marinos | 2009 | J. League Div 1 | 21 | 0 | 3 | 0 | 7 | 1 | — | | — | | 31 | 1 |
| Yokohama F. Marinos | 2010 | J. League Div 1 | 19 | 2 | 1 | 0 | 2 | 0 | — | | — | | 22 | 2 |
| Yokohama F. Marinos | 2011 | J. League Div 1 | 23 | 1 | 2 | 0 | 3 | 0 | — | | — | | 28 | 1 |
| Yokohama F. Marinos | Total | | 73 | 4 | 9 | 0 | 16 | 1 | — | | — | | 98 | 5 |
| FC Tokyo | 2012 | J. League Div 1 | 28 | 3 | 1 | 0 | 4 | 0 | 7 | 2 | 1 | 1 | 41 | 6 |
| FC Tokyo | 2013 | J. League Div 1 | 32 | 5 | 5 | 0 | 5 | 0 | — | | — | | 42 | 5 |
| FC Tokyo | Total | | 60 | 8 | 6 | 0 | 9 | 0 | 7 | 2 | — | | 83 | 11 |
| Cerezo Osaka | 2014 | J. League Div 1 | 30 | 1 | 3 | 0 | 2 | 2 | 7 | 1 | — | | 42 | 4 |
| Cerezo Osaka | 2015 | J2 League | 19 | 3 | 0 | 0 | — | | — | | — | | 19 | 3 |
| Cerezo Osaka | Total | | 49 | 4 | 3 | 0 | 2 | 2 | 7 | 1 | — | | 61 | 7 |
| Real Zaragoza | 2015–16 | Segunda División | 8 | 0 | 1 | 0 | — | | — | | — | | 9 | 0 |
| Shonan Bellmare | 2016 | J1 League | 24 | 1 | 3 | 0 | 2 | 1 | — | | — | | 29 | 2 |
| Omiya Ardija | 2017 | J1 League | 16 | 0 | 3 | 0 | 3 | 0 | — | | — | | 22 | 0 |
| Nagoya Grampus | 2018 | J1 League | 18 | 0 | 2 | 0 | 5 | 0 | — | | — | | 25 | 0 |
| Nagoya Grampus | 2019 | J1 League | 12 | 1 | 0 | 0 | 3 | 2 | — | | — | | 15 | 3 |
| Nagoya Grampus | Total | | 30 | 1 | 2 | 0 | 8 | 2 | — | | — | | 40 | 3 |
| Machida Zelvia | 2021 | J2 League | 40 | 7 | 0 | 0 | 0 | 0 | — | | — | | 40 | 7 |
| Machida Zelvia | 2022 | J2 League | 38 | 4 | 1 | 0 | 0 | 0 | — | | — | | 39 | 4 |
| Machida Zelvia | Total | | 78 | 11 | 1 | 0 | 0 | 0 | — | | — | | 79 | 11 |
| Gainare Tottori | 2023 | J3 League | 21 | 3 | 1 | 0 | 0 | 0 | — | | — | | 22 | 3 |
| Gainare Tottori | 2024 | J3 League | 12 | 0 | 0 | 0 | 1 | 0 | — | | — | | 13 | 0 |
| Gainare Tottori | Total | | 33 | 3 | 1 | 0 | 1 | 0 | — | | — | | 35 | 3 |
| Career total | | | 389 | 34 | 29 | 0 | 45 | 8 | 14 | 3 | 1 | 1 | 478 | 46 |

== Honours ==
- J1 League Player of the Month: September 2013
