= Yusuke Tanaka (footballer, born April 1986) =

Japanese footballer

Yūsuke Tanaka 田中 裕介
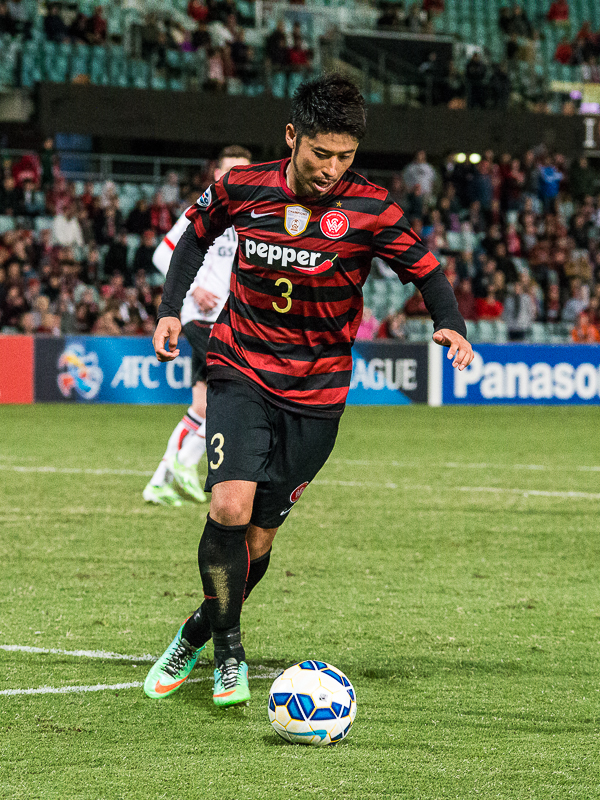
- Tanaka playing for Western Sydney Wanderers in the 2015 Asian Champions League

Personal information
- Full name: Yūsuke Tanaka
- Date of birth: April 14, 1986 (age 40)
- Place of birth: Hachiōji, Tokyo, Japan
- Height: 1.81 m (5 ft 11 in)
- Position: Defender

Youth career
- 2002–2004: Tōkō Gakuen High School

Senior career*
Years	Team	Apps	(Gls)
2005–2010	Yokohama F. Marinos	88	(2)
2011–2014	Kawasaki Frontale	117	(8)
2015	Western Sydney Wanderers	10	(0)
2015–2018	Cerezo Osaka	65	(1)
2019–2021	Fagiano Okayama	66	(1)
2022	Shibuya City FC	7	(0)
Total		353	(12)

International career^{‡}
2007	Japan U-23	1	(0)
Medal record
Cerezo Osaka
Winner	J.League Cup	2017
Winner	Emperor's Cup	2017
- * Club domestic league appearances and goals as of 10 January 2023, 16:22 (UTC) ‡ National team caps and goals as of 19 February 2014

Yūsuke Tanaka (Japanese: 田中 裕介, born April 14, 1986) is a Japanese former footballer who played as a defender.

== Career ==
On 11 January 2015, Tanaka signed with Australian A-League side Western Sydney Wanderers. He was released by the Wanderers on 6 June 2015.

Tanaka played for various Japanese J League teams, including Yokohama F. Marinos and Kawasaki Frontale.

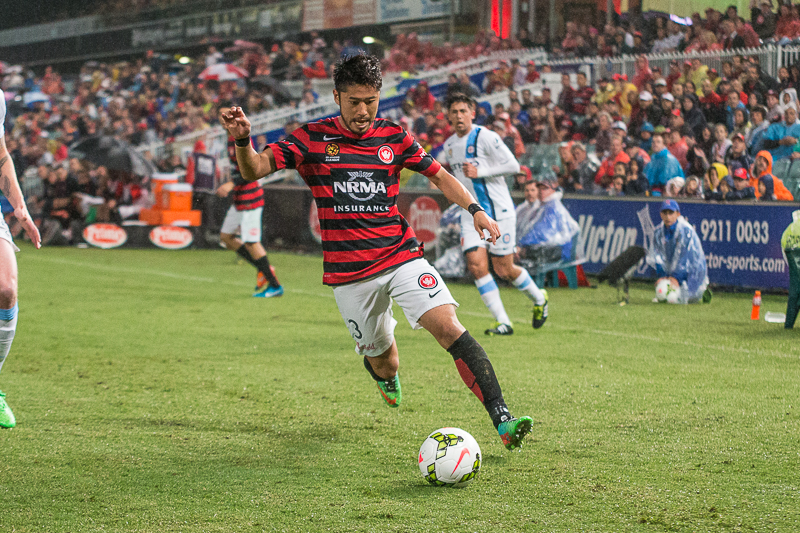

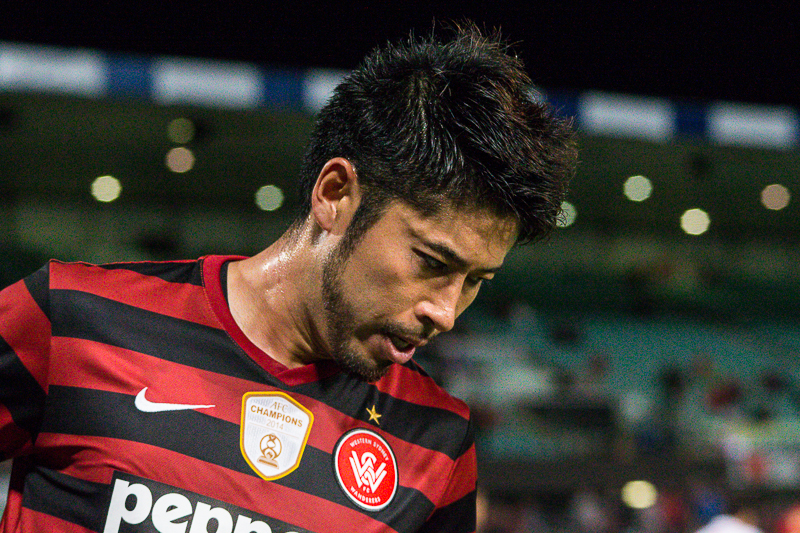

== J-League Firsts ==
- Appearance: November 26, 2006. Yokohama F Marinos 0 vs 1 Ōita Trinita, Nissan Stadium

== Career statistics ==
Appearances and goals by club, season and competition
Club	Season	League			Cup		League Cup		Continental		Other		Total	
Club	Season	Division	Apps	Goals	Apps	Goals	Apps	Goals	Apps	Goals	Apps	Goals	Apps	Goals
Yokohama F. Marinos	2005	J1 League	0	0	0	0	0	0	0	0	—		0	0
Yokohama F. Marinos	2006	J1 League	2	0	3	0	0	0	—		—		5	0
Yokohama F. Marinos	2007	J1 League	10	0	1	1	4	0	—		—		15	1
Yokohama F. Marinos	2008	J1 League	25	1	3	0	4	0	—		—		32	1
Yokohama F. Marinos	2009	J1 League	31	1	3	1	10	2	—		—		44	4
Yokohama F. Marinos	2010	J1 League	20	0	6	0	1	0	—		—		27	0
Yokohama F. Marinos	Total		88	2	16	2	19	2	0	0	—		123	6
Kawasaki Frontale	2011	J1 League	30	2	3	0	4	0	—		—		37	2
Kawasaki Frontale	2012	J1 League	29	4	3	0	6	0	—		—		38	4
Kawasaki Frontale	2013	J1 League	31	1	2	0	9	0	—		—		42	1
Kawasaki Frontale	2014	J1 League	27	1	0	0	4	1	8 (Note: Appearances in AFC Champions League)	0	—		39	2
Kawasaki Frontale	Total		117	8	9	0	23	1	8	0	—		157	9
Western Sydney Wanderers	2014–15	A-League	10	0	—		—		5	0	—		15	0
Cerezo Osaka	2015	J2 League	9	1	1	0	—		—		—		10	1
Cerezo Osaka	2016	J2 League	33	0	3	0	—		—		—		36	0
Cerezo Osaka	2017	J1 League	18	0	6	1	11	1	—		—		35	2
Cerezo Osaka	2018	J1 League	5	0	1	0	1	0	1	0	1 (Note: Appearance in Japanese Super Cup)	0	9	0
Cerezo Osaka	Total		65	1	11	1	12	1	1	0	1	0	90	3
Fagiano Okayama	2019	J2 League	36	1	0	0	—		—		—		36	1
Fagiano Okayama	2020	J2 League	22	0	—		—		—		—		22	0
Fagiano Okayama	2021	J2 League	8	0	1	0	—		—		—		9	0
Fagiano Okayama	Total		66	1	1	0	—		—		—		67	1
Career total			346	12	37	3	54	4	14	0	1	0	451	19
