= 2006–07 Celtic F.C. season =

Celtic
2006–07 season
- Chairman: Brian Quinn
- Manager: Gordon Strachan
- Ground: Celtic Park; Glasgow, Scotland (Capacity: 60,355)
- Scottish Premier League: 1st
- Scottish Cup: Winners
- Scottish League Cup: Quarter-finals
- Champions League: Round of 16
- Top goalscorer: League: Jan Vennegoor of Hesselink (13); All: Jan Vennegoor of Hesselink (18)
Home colours	Away colours	Third colours

Celtic started season 2006–07 looking to retain the Scottish Premier League trophy and the Scottish League Cup. They also competed in the Scottish Cup, and entered the Champions League at the group stage. Such was the good form of Celtic and the lack of a clear rival in the early stages of the 2006–07 season, that bookmakers Paddy Power paid out on Celtic as the winners of the SPL on 6 November 2006, only 13 games into the season. By mid-November Celtic were 11 points clear of their nearest challengers.

Having qualified automatically for the group stage of the Champions League, Celtic were drawn with Benfica, Copenhagen, and Manchester United. Although Celtic lost their 3 away games, a 100% record at home earned them qualification to the knockout stage for the first time since the group format was introduced in 1992–93. Their opponents in the last 16 were Milan. After both legs of the tie ended 0–0, Celtic's Champions League run was ended by a solitary Milan goal in extra-time by Kaká.

During the January 2007 transfer window Celtic signed Scotland internationals and former Hearts players Steven Pressley and Paul Hartley, full-back Jean-Joël Perrier-Doumbé from Rennes on loan and goalkeeper Mark Brown from Inverness Caledonian Thistle.

On 22 April 2007 Celtic won their second consecutive league championship, and 40th overall. The title was secured by an injury-time free-kick from Shunsuke Nakamura in a 2–1 victory against Kilmarnock. The result left Celtic 13 points clear of Rangers with four matches remaining. They finished the season 12 points above Rangers.

On 26 May 2007 Celtic won the Scottish Cup for a record 34th time after beating Dunfermline 1–0. The winner was scored by Jean-Joël Perrier-Doumbé in the 84th minute.

== Results ==
=== Scottish Premier League ===
29 July 2006 SPL	Celtic	4–1	Kilmarnock	Celtic Park
	Żurawski 25', 90+3'; Jarošík 38'; Nakamura 75'	BBC Sport	Naismith 87'	Attendance: 54,620; Referee: Iain Brines

6 August 2006 SPL	Hearts	2–1	Celtic	Tynecastle Stadium
	Bednář 49', 87'	BBC Sport	Petrov 65'	Attendance: 16,822; Referee: Stuart Dougal

12 August 2006 SPL	Celtic	2–0	St Mirren	Celtic Park
	McManus 49'; Petrov 65'	BBC Sport		Attendance: 56,579; Referee: Brian Winter

20 August 2006 SPL	Inverness CT	1–1	Celtic	Caledonian Stadium
	Munro 80'	BBC Sport	Pearson 26'	Attendance: 7,332; Referee: Craig Thomson

26 August 2006 SPL	Celtic	2–1	Hibernian	Celtic Park
	Żurawski 62'; Vennegoor of Hesselink 66'	BBC Sport	Brown 8'	Attendance: 58,078; Referee: Charlie Richmond

9 September 2006 SPL	Aberdeen	0–1	Celtic	Pittodrie Stadium
		BBC Sport	Vennegoor of Hesselink 79'	Attendance: 15,304; Referee: Mike McCurry

16 September 2006 SPL	Celtic	1–0	Dunfermline Athletic	Celtic Park
	McManus 31'	BBC Sport		Attendance: 55,894; Referee: Eddie Smith

23 September 2006 SPL	Celtic	2–0	Rangers	Celtic Park
	Gravesen 35'; Miller 74'	BBC Sport		Attendance: 59,341; Referee: Dougie McDonald

1 October 2006 SPL	Falkirk	0–1	Celtic	Falkirk Stadium
		BBC Sport	McGeady 84'	Attendance: 7,139; Referee: Iain Brines

14 October 2006 SPL	Dundee United	1–4	Celtic	Tannadice Park
	Hunt 5'	BBC Sport	Nakamura 44', 48', 58'; Vennegoor of Hesselink 52'	Attendance: 10,504; Referee: Mike McCurry

21 October 2006 SPL	Celtic	2–1	Motherwell	Celtic Park
	Craigan 16' (o.g.); Żurawski 66'	BBC Sport	McDonald 77'	Attendance: 57,742; Referee: Alan Freeland

28 October 2006 SPL	Kilmarnock	1–2	Celtic	Rugby Park
	Nish 49'	BBC Sport	Nakamura 55'; Miller 75'	Attendance: 10,083; Referee: John Underhill

4 November 2006 SPL	Celtic	2–1	Hearts	Celtic Park
	Jarošík 86'; Gordon 90+1' (o.g.)	BBC Sport	Velička 72'	Attendance: 58,971; Referee: Craig Thomson

12 November 2006 SPL	St Mirren	1–3	Celtic	Love Street
	Sutton 56'	BBC Sport	Gravesen 2', 21', 69'	Attendance: 8,445; Referee: Stuart Dougal

18 November 2006 SPL	Celtic	3–0	Inverness CT	Celtic Park
	Dods 43' (o.g.); Vennegoor of Hesselink 72'; Jarošík 85'	BBC Sport		Attendance: 56,637; Referee: Kenny Clark

26 November 2006 SPL	Hibernian	2–2	Celtic	Easter Road
	Sproule 12'; Thomson 63'	BBC Sport	Sno 70'; McGeady 74'	Attendance: 16,747; Referee: Mike McCurry

2 December 2006 SPL	Celtic	1–0	Aberdeen	Celtic Park
	Żurawski 72'	BBC Sport		Attendance: 58,911; Referee: Dougie McDonald

10 December 2006 SPL	Dunfermline Athletic	1–2	Celtic	East End Park
	Simmons 90+2'	BBC Sport	McGeady 49'; Żurawski 68'	Attendance: 7,080; Referee: Craig Thomson

17 December 2006 SPL	Rangers	1–1	Celtic	Ibrox Stadium
	Hemdani 88'	BBC Sport	Gravesen 38'	Attendance: 50,418; Referee: Kenny Clark

23 December 2006 SPL	Celtic	1–0	Falkirk	Celtic Park
	Gravesen 24'	BBC Sport		Attendance: 55,000; Referee: Iain Brines

26 December 2006 SPL	Celtic	2–2	Dundee United	Celtic Park
	O'Dea 78'; Nakamura 80'	BBC Sport	Robertson 17'; Samuel 58'	Attendance: 57,343; Referee: Brian Winter

30 December 2006 SPL	Motherwell	1–1	Celtic	Fir Park
	Smith 90+1'	BBC Sport	Riordan 37'	Attendance: 9,769; Referee: Charlie Richmond

2 January 2007 SPL	Celtic	2–0	Kilmarnock	Celtic Park
	O'Dea 39'; McGeady 90+1'	BBC Sport		Attendance: 57,236; Referee: Steve Conroy

14 January 2007 SPL	Hearts	1–2	Celtic	Tynecastle Stadium
	Mikoliūnas 28'	BBC Sport	Vennegoor of Hesselink 59'; Jarošík 81'	Attendance: 17,129; Referee: Kenny Clark

20 January 2007 SPL	Celtic	5–1	St Mirren	Celtic Park
	Vennegoor of Hesselink 16', 61' (pen.), 75'; McGeady 69'; Miller 82'	BBC Sport	McGinn 47'	Attendance: 58,382; Referee: Craig Thomson

28 January 2007 SPL	Inverness CT	1–2	Celtic	Caledonian Stadium
	Bayne 57'	BBC Sport	Riordan 37'; Vennegoor of Hesselink 90+3'	Attendance: 7,484; Referee: Iain Brines

10 February 2007 SPL	Celtic	1–0	Hibernian	Celtic Park
	Beattie 54'	BBC Sport		Attendance: 59,659; Referee: Stuart Dougal

17 February 2007 SPL	Aberdeen	1–2	Celtic	Pittodrie Stadium
	Mackie 90+2'	BBC Sport	Beattie 9'; Nakamura 20'	Attendance: 16,711; Referee: Craig Thomson

3 March 2007 SPL	Celtic	2–1	Dunfermline Athletic	Celtic Park
	Miller 4'; Vennegoor of Hesselink 76'	BBC Sport	Hammill 87'	Attendance: 59,131; Referee: Steve Conroy

10 March 2007 SPL	Celtic	0–1	Rangers	Celtic Park
		BBC Sport	Ehiogu 50'	Attendance: 59,425; Referee: Stuart Dougal

18 March 2007 SPL	Falkirk	1–0	Celtic	Falkirk Stadium
	Thomson 16'	BBC Sport		Attendance: 6,438; Referee: John Underhill

31 March 2007 SPL	Dundee United	1–1	Celtic	Tannadice Park
	Daly 90+2'	BBC Sport	Nakamura 48'	Attendance: 11,363; Referee: Iain Brines

7 April 2007 SPL	Celtic	1–0	Motherwell	Celtic Park
	Riordan 52'	BBC Sport		Attendance: 58,654; Referee: Eddie Smith

22 April 2007 SPL	Kilmarnock	1–2	Celtic	Rugby Park
	Nish 50'	BBC Sport	Vennegoor of Hesselink 24'; Nakamura 90+1'	Attendance: 12,654; Referee: Craig Thomson

29 April 2007 SPL	Celtic	1–3	Hearts	Celtic Park
	Pressley 63'	BBC Sport	Ivaškevičius 57'; Driver 61'; Pospíšil 71' (pen.)	Attendance: 59,510; Referee: Stuart Dougal

5 May 2007 SPL	Rangers	2–0	Celtic	Ibrox Stadium
	Boyd 34'; Adam 55'	BBC Sport		Attendance: 50,384; Referee: Craig Thomson

12 May 2007 SPL	Celtic	2–1	Aberdeen	Celtic Park
	Vennegoor of Hesselink 33', 49'	BBC Sport	Mackie 41'	Attendance: 59,000; Referee: Charlie Richmond

20 May 2007 SPL	Hibernian	2–1	Celtic	Easter Road
	Brown 60'; Sproule 90+1'	BBC Sport	Riordan 56'	Attendance: 13,885; Referee: Iain Brines

=== UEFA Champions League ===
13 September 2006 Group stage	Manchester United (England)	3–2	(Scotland) Celtic	Old Trafford
	Saha 30' (pen.), 40'; Solskjær 47'	BBC Sport	Vennegoor of Hesselink 21'; Nakamura 43'	Attendance: 74,031; Referee: Ľuboš Micheľ

26 September 2006 Group stage	Celtic (Scotland)	1–0	(Denmark) F.C. København	Celtic Park
	Miller 30' (pen.)	BBC Sport		Attendance: 57,598; Referee: Florian Meyer

17 October 2006 Group stage	Celtic (Scotland)	3–0	(Portugal) Benfica	Celtic Park
	Miller 56', 66'; Pearson 90+1'	BBC Sport		Attendance: 58,313; Referee: Eric Braamhaar

1 November 2006 Group stage	Benfica (Portugal)	3–0	(Scotland) Celtic	Estádio da Luz
	Caldwell 10' (o.g.); Nuno Gomes 22'; Karyaka 76'	BBC Sport		Attendance: 49,000; Referee: Kyros Vassaras

21 November 2006 Group stage	Celtic (Scotland)	1–0	(England) Manchester United	Celtic Park
	Nakamura 81'	BBC Sport		Attendance: 60,632; Referee: Manuel Mejuto González

6 December 2006 Group stage	F.C. København (Denmark)	3–1	(Scotland) Celtic	Parken Stadium
	Hutchinson 2'; Grønkjær 27'; Allbäck 57'	BBC Sport	Jarošík 75'	Attendance: 38,647; Referee: Bertrand Layec

20 February 2007 Knockout Round	Celtic (Scotland)	0–0	(Italy) A.C. Milan	Celtic Park
		BBC Sport		Attendance: 58,785; Referee: Terje Hauge

7 March 2007 Knockout Round	A.C. Milan (Italy)	1–0 (a.e.t.) (1–0 agg.)	(Scotland) Celtic	San Siro
	Kaká 93'	BBC Sport		Attendance: 65,000; Referee: Konrad Plautz

=== Scottish League Cup ===
19 September 2006 Third round	Celtic	2–0	St Mirren	Celtic Park
	Beattie 76'; Żurawski 87'	BBC Sport		Attendance: 32,587; Referee: Kenny Clark

7 November 2006 Quarter Final	Celtic	1–1 (a.e.t.) (4–5 p)	Falkirk	Celtic Park
	Żurawski 98'	BBC Sport	Stokes 99'	Attendance: 18,684; Referee: Charlie Richmond

=== Scottish Cup ===
6 January 2007 Third round	Celtic	4–0	Dumbarton	Celtic Park
	Żurawski 3', 9'; Vennegoor of Hesselink 43'; Riordan 69'	BBC Sport		Attendance: 18,685; Referee: Willie Collum

3 February 2007 Fourth round	Livingston	1–4	Celtic	Almondvale Stadium
	Mackay 18'	BBC Sport	O'Dea 30'; Riordan 45+1', 59'; Vennegoor of Hesselink 61'	Attendance: 7,281; Referee: Charlie Richmond

25 February 2007 Quarter Final	Inverness CT	1–2	Celtic	Caledonian Stadium
	Bayne 18'	BBC Sport	Pressley 89'; Miller 90+1'	Attendance: 7,119; Referee: Dougie McDonald

14 April 2007 Semi Final	St Johnstone	1–2	Celtic	Hampden Park
	Hardie 19'	BBC Sport	Vennegoor of Hesselink 13' (pen.), 54'	Attendance: 28,339; Referee: Charlie Richmond

26 May 2007 Final	Dunfermline Athletic	0–1	Celtic	Hampden Park
		BBC Sport	Perrier-Doumbé 84'	Attendance: 49,600; Referee: Kenny Clark

== Player statistics ==
=== Appearances and goals ===
List of squad players, including number of appearances by competition

No.	Pos	Nat	Player	Total		Premier League		Scottish Cup		League Cup		Champions League	
No.	Pos	Nat	Player	Apps	Goals	Apps	Goals	Apps	Goals	Apps	Goals	Apps	Goals
1	GK	(Poland) POL	Artur Boruc	51	0	36	0	5	0	2	0	8	0
2	DF	(Scotland) SCO	Paul Telfer	31	0	20+1	0	2	0	2	0	5+1	0
3	DF	(Guinea) GUI	Mohammed Camara	1	0	1	0	0	0	0	0	0	0
3	DF	(England) ENG	Lee Naylor	46	0	32	0	5	0	1	0	8	0
5	DF	(Scotland) SCO	Gary Caldwell	28	0	20+1	0	2	0	1	0	4	0
6	DF	(Guinea) GUI	Bobo Baldé	10	0	6	0	0	0	2	0	2	0
7	FW	(Poland) POL	Maciej Żurawski	34	10	19+7	6	1	2	2	2	4+1	0
8	MF	(England) ENG	Alan Thompson	0	0	0	0	0	0	0	0	0	0
9	FW	(Scotland) SCO	Kenny Miller	44	8	20+11	4	4	1	1	0	5+3	3
10	FW	(Netherlands) NED	Jan Vennegoor of Hesselink	30	18	17+4	13	4	4	1	0	4	1
11	MF	(Scotland) SCO	Stephen Pearson	19	2	3+10	1	0	0	2	0	1+3	1
11	MF	(Scotland) SCO	Paul Hartley	14	0	10	0	4	0	0	0	0	0
12	DF	(Scotland) SCO	Mark Wilson	16	0	12	0	1	0	0	0	3	0
14	MF	(Scotland) SCO	Derek Riordan	21	7	6+10	4	3	3	2	0	0	0
15	MF	(Netherlands) NED	Evander Sno	28	1	7+11	1	3	0	2	0	5	0
16	MF	(Denmark) DEN	Thomas Gravesen	33	6	18+4	6	4	0	1	0	4+2	0
17	DF	(Scotland) SCO	Steven Pressley	18	2	14	1	4	1	0	0	0	0
18	MF	(Northern Ireland) NIR	Neil Lennon	44	0	30+1	0	5	0	0	0	8	0
19	MF	(Bulgaria) BUL	Stiliyan Petrov	3	2	3	2	0	0	0	0	0	0
20	MF	(Czech Republic) CZE	Jiří Jarošík	34	5	18+7	4	2	0	1	0	3+3	1
21	GK	(Scotland) SCO	Mark Brown	1	0	1	0	0	0	0	0	0	0
22	GK	(Scotland) SCO	David Marshall	2	0	1+1	0	0	0	0	0	0	0
23	DF	(Slovakia) SVK	Stanislav Varga	0	0	0	0	0	0	0	0	0	0
24	DF	(Cameroon) CMR	Jean-Joël Perrier-Doumbé	5	1	3+1	0	1	1	0	0	0	0
25	MF	(Japan) JPN	Shunsuke Nakamura	50	11	37	9	5	0	0	0	7+1	2
26	FW	(Republic of Ireland) IRL	Cillian Sheridan	2	0	0+1	0	1	0	0	0	0	0
29	FW	(Scotland) SCO	Shaun Maloney	15	0	7+2	0	0	0	1	0	2+3	0
33	MF	(Scotland) SCO	Ross Wallace	2	0	2	0	0	0	0	0	0	0
35	MF	(Scotland) SCO	Paul Lawson	0	0	0	0	0	0	0	0	0	0
37	FW	(Scotland) SCO	Craig Beattie	20	3	9+7	2	1	0	1	1	0+2	0
41	DF	(Scotland) SCO	John Kennedy	3	0	3	0	0	0	0	0	0	0
44	DF	(Scotland) SCO	Stephen McManus	44	2	31	2	4	0	1	0	8	0
45	MF	(Republic of Ireland) IRL	Jim O'Brien	0	0	0	0	0	0	0	0	0	0
46	MF	(Republic of Ireland) IRL	Aiden McGeady	46	5	22+12	5	4	0	2	0	5+1	0
47	GK	(Northern Ireland) NIR	Michael McGovern	0	0	0	0	0	0	0	0	0	0
48	DF	(Republic of Ireland) IRL	Darren O'Dea	21	3	9+5	2	3	1	1	0	2+1	0
49	DF	(Scotland) SCO	Scott Cuthbert	0	0	0	0	0	0	0	0	0	0
50	DF	(Scotland) SCO	Gary Irvine	0	0	0	0	0	0	0	0	0	0
51	MF	(Scotland) SCO	Nicky Riley	0	0	0	0	0	0	0	0	0	0
52	DF	(Scotland) SCO	Paul Caddis	0	0	0	0	0	0	0	0	0	0
54	MF	(Scotland) SCO	Ryan Conroy	0	0	0	0	0	0	0	0	0	0
56	MF	(Iceland) ISL	Teddy Bjarnason	1	0	1	0	0	0	0	0	0	0

NB: Players with a zero in every column only appeared as unused substitutes

=== Goal scorers ===
R	Player	Scottish Premier League	Scottish League Cup	Scottish Cup	UEFA Champions League	Total
1	(Netherlands) Jan Vennegoor of Hesselink	13	0	4	1	18
2	(Japan) Shunsuke Nakamura	9	0	0	2	11
3	(Poland) Maciej Żurawski	6	2	2	0	10
4	(Scotland) Kenny Miller	4	0	1	3	8
5	(Scotland) Derek Riordan	4	0	3	0	7
6	(Denmark) Thomas Gravesen	6	0	0	0	6
7	(Czech Republic) Jiří Jarošík	4	0	0	1	5
8	(Republic of Ireland) Darren O'Dea	2	0	1	0	3
8	(Scotland) Craig Beattie	2	1	0	0	3
8	(Bulgaria) Stiliyan Petrov	2	0	0	0	2
8	(Scotland) Stephen McManus	2	0	0	0	2
8	(Scotland) Stephen Pearson	1	0	0	1	2
8	(Scotland) Steven Pressley	1	0	1	0	2
9	(Netherlands) Evander Sno	1	0	0	0	1
9	(Cameroon) Jean-Joël Perrier-Doumbé	0	0	1	0	1

== Team statistics ==
=== League table ===
Pos	Team	Pld	W	D	L	GF	GA	GD	Pts	Qualification or relegation (Note: Teams played each other three times (33 matches), before the league split into two groups (the top six and the bottom six) for the last five matches.)
1	Celtic (C)	38	26	6	6	65	34	+31	84	Qualification for the Champions League third qualifying round
2	Rangers	38	21	9	8	61	32	+29	72	Qualification for the Champions League second qualifying round
3	Aberdeen	38	19	8	11	55	38	+17	65	Qualification for the UEFA Cup first round
4	Heart of Midlothian	38	17	10	11	47	35	+12	61	
5	Kilmarnock	38	16	7	15	47	54	−7	55	

Source: Scottish Professional Football League
Rules for classification: 1) Points; 2) Goal difference; 3) Goals scored
(C) Champions

== Technical staff ==
Position	Staff
Manager	Gordon Strachan
Assistant Manager	Garry Pendrey
First Team Coach	Tommy Burns
Goalkeeping Coach	Jim Blyth
Head of Youth Academy	Tommy Burns
Head of Recruitment	John Park
Physiotherapist	Tim Williamson
Physiotherapist	Gavin McCarthy
Doctor	Gerry McCann
Head of Sports Science	Jim Henry

Last updated: 12 June 2017

== Transfers ==
=== In ===
Date	Player	From	Fee
19 June 2006	(Czech Republic) Jiří Jarošík	(England) Chelsea	£1,100,000
20 June 2006	(Netherlands) Evander Sno	(Netherlands) Feyenoord	£80,000
23 June 2006	(Scotland) Derek Riordan	(Scotland) Hibernian	£150,000
1 July 2006	(Scotland) Kenny Miller	(England) Wolverhampton Wanderers	Free
1 July 2006	(Scotland) Gary Caldwell	(Scotland) Hibernian	Free
24 August 2006	(England) Lee Naylor	(England) Wolverhampton Wanderers	£600,000+Exchange
24 August 2006	(Netherlands) Jan Vennegoor of Hesselink	(Netherlands) PSV Eindhoven	£4,000,000
30 August 2006	(Denmark) Thomas Gravesen	(Spain) Real Madrid	£2,000,000
1 January 2007	(Scotland) Steven Pressley	(Scotland) Heart of Midlothian	Free
18 January 2007	(Scotland) Mark Brown	(Scotland) Inverness Caledonian Thistle	£300,000
25 January 2007	(Cameroon) Jean-Joël Perrier-Doumbé	(France) Rennes	Loan
31 January 2007	(Scotland) Paul Hartley	(Scotland) Heart of Midlothian	£1,100,000

=== Out ===
Date	Player	To	Fee
24 May 2006	(England) Dion Dublin	(England) Norwich City	Free
12 June 2006	(Republic of Ireland) Roy Keane		Retired
26 June 2006	(Wales) John Hartson	(England) West Brom	£500,000
7 July 2006	(Scotland) Michael Gardyne	(Scotland) Ross County	Loan
7 July 2006	(Scotland) Gary Irvine	(Scotland) Ross County	Loan
11 July 2006	(Scotland) Sandy Wood	(Scotland) Forfar	Free
14 July 2006	(Scotland) Ross Harris	(Scotland) Dundee	Free
21 July 2006	(Scotland) Mark Staunton	(England) Charlton Athletic	Undisclosed
27 July 2006	(Scotland) Paul McGowan	(Scotland) Morton	Loan
7 August 2006	(Scotland) Adam Virgo	(England) Coventry City	Loan
16 August 2006	(Guinea) Mohammed Camara	(England) Derby County	Free
24 August 2006	(Scotland) Charlie Mulgrew	(England) Wolverhampton Wanderers	Swap
30 August 2006	(Bulgaria) Stiliyan Petrov	(England) Aston Villa	£6,500,000
31 August 2006	(Slovakia) Stanislav Varga	(England) Sunderland	£400,000
31 August 2006	(Scotland) Ross Wallace	(England) Sunderland	£400,000
31 August 2006	(Scotland) Paul Lawson	(Scotland) St Johnstone	Loan
3 January 2007	(Canada) Jacob Lensky	(Netherlands) Feyenoord	Undisclosed
6 January 2007	(Republic of Ireland) James O'Brien	(Scotland) Dunfermline Athletic	Loan
8 January 2007	(Republic of Ireland) Diarmuid O'Carroll	(Scotland) Ross County	Loan
11 January 2007	(Scotland) Stephen Pearson	(England) Derby County	£750,000
12 January 2007	(England) Alan Thompson	(England) Leeds United	Loan
17 January 2007	(Scotland) David Marshall	(England) Norwich City	Loan
19 January 2007	(Scotland) Rocco Quinn	(Scotland) Kilmarnock	Loan
1 February 2007	(Scotland) Shaun Maloney	(England) Aston Villa	£1,100,000
2 April 2007	(Scotland) Paul Telfer		Free

- Expenditure: ▼£9,330,000
- Income: ▲£9,650,000
- Total loss/gain: ▲£320,000

== See also ==
- List of Celtic F.C. seasons
