= 2007–08 Celtic F.C. season =

Celtic
2007–08 season
- Chairman: Brian Quinn, John Reid
- Manager: Gordon Strachan
- Ground: Celtic Park; Glasgow, Scotland (Capacity: 60,355)
- Scottish Premier League: 1st
- Scottish Cup: Quarter-finals
- Scottish League Cup: Quarter-finals
- Champions League: Round of 16
- Top goalscorer: League: Scott McDonald (25); All: Scott McDonald (31)
Home colours	Away colours	Third colours

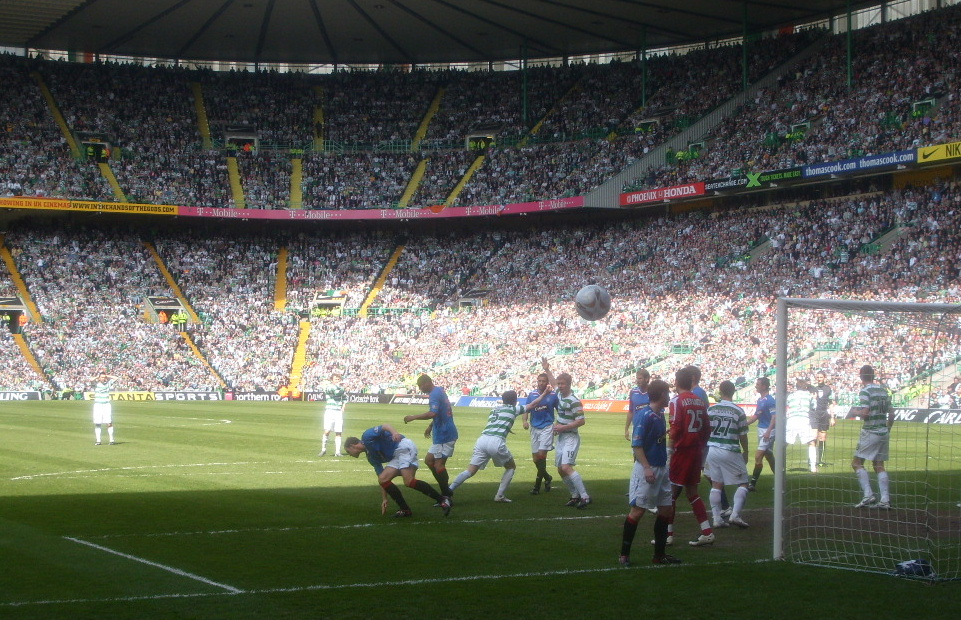
The last Old Firm clash of the season resulted in 3–2 victory for Celtic.

Celtic started the 2007–08 season looking to retain the Scottish Premier League title and the Scottish Cup. They also competed in the Scottish League Cup. The team accepted an invitation to take part in the annual Major League Soccer All-Star Game for 2007, as part of a pre-season tour of the United States, Switzerland and England. On 9 October, Celtic opened their new training facilities at Lennoxtown.

== Domestic campaign ==
Celtic started the season with a scoreless draw at Celtic Park against Kilmarnock. They then won their next five league matches scoring 12 goals in six consecutive matches and topped the league for most of the first half of the season. At the end of 2007 Celtic were still on top of the SPL standings. The Old Firm derby on 2 January 2008 and a match against Motherwell were postponed due to the death of former Celtic player and Motherwell captain Phil O'Donnell, who died on 29 December. During the break in fixtures, the team slipped to second place behind Rangers. Celtic kept in close touch with Rangers until the 2nd Old Firm derby on 31 March 2008 at Ibrox. In contrast to the first Old Firm game at Ibrox in September, in which Rangers coasted to a 3–0 win, this was a close game which finished 1–0 to Rangers, courtesy of a Kevin Thomson goal just before half-time. This put Rangers seven points clear at the top of the SPL. Celtic suffered another set-back when they lost their next game at home to Motherwell by the same scoreline. With their closest rivals seven points ahead, and with a game in hand, coupled with the success Rangers were enjoying in all competitions, many fans began to doubt Gordon Strachan, a doubt which was clearly expressed throughout Celtic Park during the game against Motherwell, when Strachan decided to take off Scott McDonald, the club's leading goalscorer for Georgios Samaras in the final 15 minutes.

However a dramatic, and seemingly unlikely, turnaround in fortunes began on 16 April, when the third Old Firm clash took place in Celtic Park. This was a highly charged affair from the kick-off, with a re-invigorated Celtic dominating the opening proceedings and making their dominance count when Shunsuke Nakamura scored a spectacular goal from around 35 yards, which later ended up as Celtic's 'Goal of the Season', on the 20-minute mark. Rangers hit back in the second half when Nacho Novo equalised but Celtic got a chance to retake the lead when Nakamura's curling shot was illegally handled off the line by Carlos Cuéllar, who was sent off. However, McDonald's penalty was struck poorly and Allan McGregor, despite having an injured ankle, was able to save it. Celtic pushed in vain for a winner against 10 men but it seemed like Rangers would get the draw they played for, and which would all but seem to secure them the title. However, in the third minute of injury time, a quick throw in led to ball being played outside the box to Samaras who knocked it down to Gary Caldwell. Caldwell hit a diagonal ball into the box where McDonald squared the ball for Jan Vennegoor of Hesselink to nod the ball home inside the six-yard box past Neil Alexander, who replaced the injured McGregor. However spectacular Nakamura's first half goal was, Vennegoor of Hesselink's proved to be a hugely pivotal moment in the title race. There were jubilant scenes around all the Celtic fans. McDonald was visibly emotional after the final whistle. 2–1 was the final score and even with the small confrontations after the final whistle between the players, Celtic showed that they were not giving up their title without a fight.

On 27 April, the fourth and final Old Firm clash was played at Celtic Park. Picking up from 11 days earlier, the game exploded into life with a fourth-minute strike from McDonald. The goal was later shown by TV replays to have been offside, however Celtic were not going to let this good fortune pass them by. Rangers equalised in the 17th minute with a David Weir header from a corner kick and Celtic's set-piece weakness was exploited again less than 15 minutes later when Daniel Cousin scored from another corner kick. Shortly before half time though, Aiden McGeady found Scott McDonald just inside the Rangers box. He turned Christian Dailly and struck a looping shot past Neil Alexander to make it 2–2. The second half saw both teams have plenty of chances and Celtic were given a penalty after Kirk Broadfoot brought down McDonald. Barry Robson took the responsibility and duly delivered by driving the ball past Alexander. It remained 3–2 and Celtic went five points clear in the SPL, however due to fixture congestion, Rangers had played three matches fewer.

Celtic's chances of winning the title improved over the following weeks when Rangers drew consecutive games against Hibernian and Motherwell. Going into the last day of the league season, the clubs were tied on points although Celtic had a superior goal difference. Celtic travelled to Tannadice Park to play Dundee United, knowing that victory would give them the title while Rangers travelled to Pittodrie to play Aberdeen, needing Celtic to fail to win against Dundee United to have any chance at all. The game at Tannadice was a tense affair with chances for both sides. During the second half, Celtic supporters had found out that Aberdeen had taken the lead against Rangers and shortly after that, Vennegoor of Hesselink connected with a corner to give Celtic the lead that would secure the title. Gordon Strachan became only the third Celtic manager ever to win three league titles in a row. The victory was dedicated to the memory of Tommy Burns, former player and manager, who had died earlier that week. Victory in the league also secured Celtic automatic entry to the group stages of the UEFA Champions League in season 2008/09.

The club were less successful in the season's domestic cup competitions. They exited the Scottish League Cup at the quarter-final stage, after suffering a 2–0 defeat to Hearts. They lost at the same stage of the Scottish Cup, losing to Aberdeen in a replay.

== UEFA Champions League campaign ==
Celtic was drawn against Russian side Spartak Moscow in the third round of qualifying for the Champions League. The first leg was played at the Luzhniki Stadium in Moscow, the venue for this year's Champions League final, and ended in a 1–1 draw, with Paul Hartley scoring his first goal for the club after joining from Heart of Midlothian eight months prior. In the return leg, Celtic emerged victorious after a 1–1 draw, with Scott McDonald scoring his first goal for the club. The game ended in a penalty shootout, with Artur Boruc saving twice.

Celtic were drawn alongside Milan, Benfica and Shakhtar Donetsk in the Champions League group stages. Celtic lost the first group match, away to Shakhtar in Ukraine, 2–0, but they rebounded with a 2–1 win over defending champions Milan at Celtic Park, leaving them in second in the group after two matches. Following McDonald's match-winning goal, Celtic fan Robert McHendry ran onto the pitch and tapped Milan goalkeeper Dida on the face as he ran past his goal; Dida initially gave chase, then fell to the pitch and was stretchered off. McHendry later surrendered to police and was banned for life from Parkhead, and Dida received a two-game suspension for breaching UEFA's policy of "principles of loyalty, integrity and sportsmanship", which was reduced to one match on appeal. Celtic were found guilty of "lack of organisation and improper conduct of supporters" and were issued a £25,000 fine, half of which was suspended for two years.

The third match day saw Celtic drop to bottom in the game against Benfica. Celtic lost 1–0 with the goal coming in the 86th minute. Next up, Celtic again faced Benfica, this time at home. They won this 1–0 with a goal from Aiden McGeady before half-time. In the next game at Celtic Park, they came back from 1–0 down against Shakhtar Donetsk to win 2–1 thanks to a winner from Massimo Donati with the last kick of the game, which moved them up to second in the group, guaranteeing post-Christmas European football, and leaving them needing one point from the last game in Milan to be sure of qualifying for the round of 16. Despite losing 1–0 in Milan, Celtic qualified as Benfica won 2–1 in Donetsk. In the knockout stage, Celtic drew Barcelona, where Celtic lost both the first leg at home (3–2) and the second leg and the second leg (1–0) away at Camp Nou.

== Results ==
=== Scottish Premier League ===
5 August 2007 SPL	Celtic	0–0	Kilmarnock	Glasgow
		BBC Sport		Stadium: Celtic Park; Attendance: 60,000; Referee: Craig Thomson

11 August 2007 SPL	Falkirk	1–4	Celtic	Falkirk
	Higdon 5'	BBC Sport	Milne 30' (o.g.); Miller 76'; Nakamura 79'; Vennegoor of Hesselink 81'	Stadium: Falkirk Stadium; Attendance: 6,329; Referee: Dougie McDonald

19 August 2007 SPL	Aberdeen	1–3	Celtic	Aberdeen
	Brewster 24'	BBC Sport	Donati 61'; Miller 85', 90+2'	Stadium: Pittodrie Stadium; Attendance: 16,232; Referee: Charlie Richmond

25 August 2007 SPL	Celtic	5–0	Hearts	Glasgow
	Berra 9' (o.g.); Donati 22'; Brown 61'; Vennegoor of Hesselink 63' (pen.); Nakamura 79'	BBC Sport		Stadium: Celtic Park; Attendance: 57,300; Referee: Iain Brines

2 September 2007 SPL	St Mirren	1–5	Celtic	Paisley
	Miranda 75'	BBC Sport	Brown 22'; McDonald 25'; Vennegoor of Hesselink 53'; Miranda 56' (o.g.); McManus 74'	Stadium: Love Street; Attendance: 7,840; Referee: Kenny Clark

15 September 2007 SPL	Celtic	5–0	Inverness CT	Glasgow
	Vennegoor of Hesselink 15', 59'; Donati 41'; Nakamura 56'; McGuire 70' (o.g.)	BBC Sport		Stadium: Celtic Park; Attendance: 56,020; Referee: Craig Thomson

23 September 2007 SPL	Hibernian	3–2	Celtic	Edinburgh
	Fletcher 5'; Gathuessi 41'; Shiels 87'	BBC Sport	McGeady 26'; Caldwell 66'	Stadium: Easter Road; Attendance: 16,125; Referee: Alan Freeland

29 September 2007 SPL	Celtic	3–0	Dundee United	Glasgow
	McDonald 7', 67', 72'	BBC Sport		Stadium: Celtic Park; Attendance: 57,000; Referee: Dougie McDonald

7 October 2007 SPL	Gretna	1–2	Celtic	Motherwell
	Yantorno 37'	BBC Sport	Killen 86'; McDonald 90+2'	Stadium: Fir Park; Attendance: 6,011; Referee: Brian Winter

20 October 2007 SPL	Rangers	3–0	Celtic	Glasgow
	Novo 38', 78' (pen.); Ferguson 55'	BBC Sport		Stadium: Ibrox Stadium; Attendance: 50,428; Referee: Mike McCurry

27 October 2007 SPL	Celtic	3–0	Motherwell	Glasgow
	McDonald 42', 59', 88' (pen.)	BBC Sport		Stadium: Celtic Park; Attendance: 57,633; Referee: Stuart Dougal

3 November 2007 SPL	Kilmarnock	1–2	Celtic	Kilmarnock
	Wright 55'	BBC Sport	McDonald 34', 36'	Stadium: Rugby Park; Attendance: 8,260; Referee: Dougie McDonald

24 November 2007 SPL	Celtic	3–0	Aberdeen	Glasgow
	Vennegoor of Hesselink 14'; McGeady 27'; McDonald 49'	BBC Sport		Stadium: Celtic Park; Attendance: 58,000; Referee: Mike McCurry

1 December 2007 SPL	Hearts	1–1	Celtic	Edinburgh
	Velička 90+1' (pen.)	BBC Sport	McDonald 73'	Stadium: Tynecastle Stadium; Attendance: 16,454; Referee: Kenny Clark

8 December 2007 SPL	Celtic	1–1	St Mirren	Glasgow
	Riordan 85'	BBC Sport	McGinn 75'	Stadium: Celtic Park; Attendance: 55,747; Referee: Charlie Richmond

11 December 2007 SPL	Celtic	4–0	Falkirk	Glasgow
	McDonald 9' (pen.); McGeady 41', 67', 82'	BBC Sport		Stadium: Celtic Park; Attendance: 54,291; Referee: Dougie McDonald

16 December 2007 SPL	Inverness CT	3–2	Celtic	Inverness
	Rankin 42' (pen.); Proctor 57'; Cowie 61'	BBC Sport	Vennegoor of Hesselink 24', 26'	Stadium: Caledonian Stadium; Attendance: 7,004; Referee: Alan Freeland

22 December 2007 SPL	Celtic	1–1	Hibernian	Glasgow
	Jarošík 78'	BBC Sport	Murphy 21'	Stadium: Celtic Park; Attendance: 58,016; Referee: Mike McCurry

26 December 2007 SPL	Dundee United	0–2	Celtic	Dundee
		BBC Sport	Vennegoor of Hesselink 68'; McManus 75'	Stadium: Tannadice Park; Attendance: 12,357; Referee: Eddie Smith

29 December 2007 SPL	Celtic	3–0	Gretna	Glasgow
	McDonald 35'; Brown 49'; McGeady 90+3'	BBC Sport		Stadium: Celtic Park; Attendance: 57,171; Referee: David Somers

19 January 2008 SPL	Celtic	1–0	Kilmarnock	Glasgow
	Corrigan 64' (o.g.)	BBC Sport		Stadium: Celtic Park; Attendance: 56,618; Referee: Mike McCurry

27 January 2008 SPL	Falkirk	0–1	Celtic	Falkirk
		BBC Sport	McDonald 45+1'	Stadium: Falkirk Stadium; Attendance: 6,803; Referee: John Underhill

10 February 2008 SPL	Aberdeen	1–5	Celtic	Aberdeen
	Miller 62'	BBC Sport	Nakamura 17'; McGeady 34'; McDonald 44' (pen.), 48'; Robson 74'	Stadium: Pittodrie Stadium; Attendance: 14,651; Referee: Craig Thomson

16 February 2008 SPL	Celtic	3–0	Hearts	Glasgow
	Vennegoor of Hesselink 14'; McDonald 51'; Hinkel 76'	BBC Sport		Stadium: Celtic Park; Attendance: 56,738; Referee: Dougie McDonald

24 February 2008 SPL	St Mirren	0–1	Celtic	Paisley
		BBC Sport	Nakamura 87'	Stadium: Love Street; Attendance: 7,213; Referee: Eddie Smith

27 February 2008 SPL	Celtic	2–1	Inverness CT	Glasgow
	McDonald 45+1'; Samaras 61'	BBC Sport	Niculae 70'	Stadium: Celtic Park; Attendance: 56,787; Referee: Willie Collum

1 March 2008 SPL	Hibernian	0–2	Celtic	Edinburgh
		BBC Sport	Naylor 63'; Samaras 74'	Stadium: Easter Road; Attendance: 15,735; Referee: Iain Brines

12 March 2008 SPL	Celtic	0–0	Dundee United	Glasgow
		BBC Sport		Stadium: Celtic Park; Attendance: 45,000; Referee: Mike McCurry

23 March 2008 SPL	Gretna	0–3	Celtic	Livingston
		BBC Sport	McDonald 42'; Vennegoor of Hesselink 70'; Samaras 88'	Stadium: Almondvale Stadium; Attendance: 3,561; Referee: Craig Thomson

29 March 2008 SPL	Rangers	1–0	Celtic	Glasgow
	Thomson 45+2'	BBC Sport		Stadium: Ibrox Stadium; Attendance: 50,325; Referee: Stuart Dougal

5 April 2008 SPL	Celtic	0–1	Motherwell	Glasgow
		BBC Sport	Lappin 33'	Stadium: Celtic Park; Attendance: 58,624; Referee: Calum Murray

13 April 2008 SPL	Motherwell	1–4	Celtic	Motherwell
	McManus 24' (o.g.)	BBC Sport	McManus 17'; McDonald 30'; Vennegoor of Hesselink 43', 57'	Stadium: Fir Park; Attendance: 9,771; Referee: Alan Freeland

16 April 2008 SPL	Celtic	2–1	Rangers	Glasgow
	Nakamura 20'; Vennegoor of Hesselink 90+3'	BBC Sport	Novo 55'	Stadium: Celtic Park; Attendance: 58,964; Referee: Kenny Clark

19 April 2008 SPL	Celtic	1–0	Aberdeen	Glasgow
	Samaras 56'	BBC Sport		Stadium: Celtic Park; Attendance: 55,766; Referee: Iain Brines

27 April 2008 SPL	Celtic	3–2	Rangers	Glasgow
	McDonald 4', 43'; Robson 70' (pen.)	BBC Sport	Weir 17'; Cousin 29'	Stadium: Celtic Park; Attendance: 58,662; Referee: Craig Thomson

3 May 2008 SPL	Motherwell	1–2	Celtic	Motherwell
	Porter 60'	BBC Sport	McDonald 62'; Samaras 79'	Stadium: Fir Park; Attendance: 9,158; Referee: Steve Conroy

11 May 2008 SPL	Celtic	2–0	Hibernian	Glasgow
	McManus 36'; McDonald 87'	BBC Sport		Stadium: Celtic Park; Attendance: 55,058; Referee: Dougie McDonald

22 May 2008 SPL	Dundee United	0–1	Celtic	Dundee
		BBC Sport	Vennegoor of Hesselink 72'	Stadium: Tannadice Park; Attendance: 13,613; Referee: Stuart Dougal

=== UEFA Champions League ===
15 August 2007 Third Qualifying	Spartak Moscow (Russia)	1–1	(Scotland) Celtic	Moscow, Russia
	Pavlyuchenko 42'	BBC Sport	Hartley 21'	Stadium: Luzhniki Stadium; Attendance: 67,000; Referee: Herbert Fandel

29 August 2007 Third Qualifying	Celtic (Scotland)	1–1 (a.e.t.) (2–2 agg.) (4–3 p)	(Russia) Spartak Moscow	Glasgow
	McDonald 27'	BBC Sport	Pavlyuchenko 45+1'	Stadium: Celtic Park; Attendance: 65,000; Referee: Roberto Rosetti
	Penalties
	Caldwell (penalty scored); Nakamura (penalty missed); Vennegoor of Hesselink (penalty scored); Riordan (penalty scored); Żurawski (penalty scored)		(penalty scored) Mozart; (penalty missed) Titov; (penalty scored) Pavlyuchenko; (penalty scored) Șoavă; (penalty missed) Kalynychenko

18 September 2007 Group stage	Shakhtar Donetsk (Ukraine)	2–0	(Scotland) Celtic	Donetsk, Ukraine
	Brandão 5'; Lucarelli 8'	BBC Sport		Stadium: Lokomotiv Stadium; Attendance: 25,700; Referee: Alberto Undiano Mallenco

3 October 2007 Group stage	Celtic (Scotland)	2–1	(Italy) A.C. Milan	Glasgow
	McManus 62'; McDonald 90+1'	BBC Sport	Kaká 68' (pen.)	Stadium: Celtic Park; Attendance: 58,642; Referee: Markus Merk

24 October 2007 Group stage	Benfica (Portugal)	1–0	(Scotland) Celtic	Lisbon, Portugal
	Cardozo 87'	BBC Sport		Stadium: Estádio da Luz; Attendance: 38,512; Referee: Massimo Busacca

6 November 2007 Group stage	Celtic (Scotland)	1–0	(Portugal) Benfica	Glasgow
	McGeady 45+1'	BBC Sport		Stadium: Celtic Park; Attendance: 58,691; Referee: Martin Hansson

28 November 2007 Group stage	Celtic (Scotland)	2–1	(Ukraine) Shakhtar Donetsk	Glasgow
	Jarošík 45+1'; Donati 90+2'	BBC Sport	Brandão 4'	Stadium: Celtic Park; Attendance: 59,396; Referee: Bertrand Layec

4 December 2007 Group stage	A.C. Milan (Italy)	1–0	(Scotland) Celtic	Milan, Italy
	Inzaghi 70'	BBC Sport		Stadium: San Siro; Attendance: 38,409; Referee: Tom Henning Øvrebø

20 February 2008 Knockout Round	Celtic (Scotland)	2–3	(Spain) Barcelona	Glasgow
	Vennegoor of Hesselink 16'; Robson 38'	BBC Sport	Messi 18', 79'; Henry 52'	Stadium: Celtic Park; Attendance: 56,395; Referee: Peter Fröjdfeldt

4 March 2008 Knockout Round	Barcelona (Spain)	1–0 (4–2 agg.)	(Scotland) Celtic	Barcelona, Spain
	Xavi 3'	BBC Sport		Stadium: Camp Nou; Attendance: 75,326; Referee: Pieter Vink

=== Scottish League Cup ===
26 September 2007 Third round	Dundee	1–2	Celtic	Dundee
	K. McDonald 71'	BBC Sport	McDonald 27'; Vennegoor of Hesselink 60'	Stadium: Dens Park; Attendance: 8,203; Referee: Iain Brines

31 October 2007 Quarter-final	Celtic	0–2	Hearts	Glasgow
		BBC Sport	Velicka 77', 86'	Stadium: Celtic Park; Attendance: 21,492; Referee: Kenny Clark

=== Scottish Cup ===
12 January 2008 Fourth round	Celtic	3–0	Stirling Albion	Glasgow
	Vennegoor of Hesselink 37'; McDonald 70'; Nakamura 75'	BBC Sport		Stadium: Celtic Park; Attendance: 27,923; Referee: Euan Norris

2 February 2008 Fifth round	Kilmarnock	1–5	Celtic	Kilmarnock
	Hamill 66'	BBC Sport	McDonald 22', 67'; Caldwell 52'; Vennegoor of Hesselink 58'; Samaras 85'	Stadium: Rugby Park; Attendance: 6,491; Referee: Iain Brines

9 March 2008 Quarter-final	Aberdeen	1–1	Celtic	Aberdeen
	de Visscher 78'	BBC Sport	Vennegoor of Hesselink 90+1'	Stadium: Pittodrie Stadium; Attendance: 10,909; Referee: Charlie Richmond

18 March 2008 Quarter-final RP	Celtic	0–1	Aberdeen	Glasgow
		BBC Sport	Mackie 69'	Stadium: Celtic Park; Attendance: 33,506; Referee: Charlie Richmond

== Player statistics ==
=== Appearances and goals ===
List of squad players, including number of appearances by competition

No.	Pos	Nat	Player	Total		Premier League		Scottish Cup		League Cup		Champions League	
No.	Pos	Nat	Player	Apps	Goals	Apps	Goals	Apps	Goals	Apps	Goals	Apps	Goals
1	GK	(Poland) POL	Artur Boruc	45	0	30	0	4	0	2	0	9	0
2	DF	(Germany) GER	Andreas Hinkel	19	1	16	1	3	0	0	0	0	0
3	DF	(England) ENG	Lee Naylor	47	1	33	1	3	0	2	0	9	0
4	DF	(Scotland) SCO	Adam Virgo	0	0	0	0	0	0	0	0	0	0
5	DF	(Scotland) SCO	Gary Caldwell	51	2	35	1	4	1	2	0	9+1	0
6	DF	(Guinea) GUI	Dianbobo Balde	4	0	4	0	0	0	0	0	0	0
7	FW	(Poland) POL	Maciej Żurawski	8	0	1+4	0	0	0	0	0	0+3	0
8	MF	(Scotland) SCO	Scott Brown	48	3	31+3	3	3	0	2	0	9	0
9	FW	(Scotland) SCO	Kenny Miller	2	3	1+1	3	0	0	0	0	0	0
9	FW	(Greece) GRE	Georgios Samaras (from January)	21	6	5+11	5	0+3	1	0	0	0+2	0
10	FW	(Netherlands) NED	Jan Vennegoor of Hesselink	46	20	31+1	15	4	3	2	1	7+1	1
11	MF	(Scotland) SCO	Paul Hartley	39	1	23+4	0	1+1	0	1	0	9	1
12	DF	(Scotland) SCO	Mark Wilson	16	0	8+3	0	0	0	0	0	4+1	0
14	FW	(Scotland) SCO	Derek Riordan	11	1	2+6	1	0+1	0	1	0	0+1	0
16	MF	(Denmark) DEN	Thomas Gravesen	0	0	0	0	0	0	0	0	0	0
17	DF	(Scotland) SCO	Steven Pressley	7	0	5	0	0	0	0	0	1+1	0
18	MF	(Italy) ITA	Massimo Donati	41	4	22+3	3	3+1	0	2	0	7+3	1
19	MF	(Scotland) SCO	Barry Robson	16	3	9+6	2	0	0	0	0	1	1
20	MF	(Czech Republic) CZE	Jiří Jarošík	13	2	6+2	1	0	0	0	0	5	1
21	GK	(Scotland) SCO	Mark Brown	9	0	8	0	0	0	0	0	1	0
23	FW	(England) ENG	Ben Hutchinson	2	0	0+2	0	0	0	0	0	0	0
24	DF	(Cameroon) CMR	Jean-Joël Perrier-Doumbé	3	0	2	0	0	0	0	0	1	0
25	MF	(Japan) JPN	Shunsuke Nakamura	36	7	24+2	6	4	1	0	0	5+1	0
26	FW	(Republic of Ireland) IRL	Cillian Sheridan	1	0	0+1	0	0	0	0	0	0	0
27	FW	(Australia) AUS	Scott McDonald	52	31	35+1	25	4	3	2	1	8+2	2
29	MF	(Japan) JPN	Koki Mizuno	0	0	0	0	0	0	0	0	0	0
33	FW	(New Zealand) NZL	Chris Killen	27	1	2+18	1	0+1	0	0+1	0	1+4	0
41	DF	(Scotland) SCO	John Kennedy	14	0	5+2	0	0	0	2	0	4+1	0
44	DF	(Scotland) SCO	Stephen McManus	53	5	37	4	4	0	2	0	10	1
45	MF	(Republic of Ireland) IRL	James O'Brien	2	0	0+1	0	0+1	0	0	0	0	0
46	MF	(Republic of Ireland) IRL	Aiden McGeady	51	8	35+1	7	4	0	1	0	8+2	1
47	GK	(Northern Ireland) NIR	Michael McGovern	0	0	0	0	0	0	0	0	0	0
48	DF	(Republic of Ireland) IRL	Darren O'Dea	10	0	3+3	0	1+1	0	0	0	1+1	0
52	DF	(Scotland) SCO	Paul Caddis	4	0	0+2	0	1	0	0	0	1	0
54	MF	(Scotland) SCO	Ryan Conroy	2	0	2	0	0	0	0	0	0	0
55	MF	(Scotland) SCO	Paul McGowan	1	0	0+1	0	0	0	0	0	0	0
56	MF	(Iceland) ISL	Teddy Bjarnason	0	0	0	0	0	0	0	0	0	0

== Team statistics ==
=== League table ===
Pos	Team	Pld	W	D	L	GF	GA	GD	Pts	Qualification or relegation (Note: Teams played each other three times (33 matches), before the league split into two groups (the top six and the bottom six) for the last five matches.)
1	Celtic (C)	38	28	5	5	84	26	+58	89	Qualification for the Champions League group stage
2	Rangers	38	27	5	6	84	33	+51	86	Qualification for the Champions League second qualifying round
3	Motherwell	38	18	6	14	50	46	+4	60	Qualification for the UEFA Cup first round
4	Aberdeen	38	15	8	15	50	58	−8	53	
5	Dundee United	38	14	10	14	53	47	+6	52	

Source: Scottish Professional Football League
Rules for classification: 1) Points; 2) Goal difference; 3) Goals scored
(C) Champions

== Technical staff ==
Position	Staff
Manager	Gordon Strachan
Assistant Manager	Gary Pendrey
First Team Coach	Tommy Burns
Goalkeeping Coach	Jim Blyth
Head of Youth Academy	Chris McCart
Head of Recruitment	John Park
Physiotherapist	Graeme Parsons
Physiotherapist	Gavin McCarthy
Doctor	Derek McCormack
Head of Sports Science	Greg Dupont

Last updated: 12 June 2017

== Transfers ==
=== In ===
Date	Player	From	Fee
29 May 2007	(Australia) Scott McDonald	(Scotland) Motherwell	£700,000
29 May 2007	(Scotland) Scott Brown	(Scotland) Hibernian	£4,400,000
31 May 2007	(New Zealand) Chris Killen	(Scotland) Hibernian	Free
29 June 2007	(Italy) Massimo Donati	(Italy) AC Milan	£3,000,000
30 June 2007	(Bulgaria) Tomislav Pavlov	(Bulgaria) CSKA Sofia	Free
11 August 2007	(Cameroon) Jean-Joël Perrier-Doumbé	(France) Rennes	Free
28 August 2007	(Italy) Luca Santonocito	(Italy) Internazionale	Free
4 January 2008	(Germany) Andreas Hinkel	(Spain) Sevilla	£1,900,000
29 January 2008	(Japan) Koki Mizuno	(Japan) JEF United Ichihara Chiba	£300,000
29 January 2008	(Greece) Georgios Samaras	(England) Manchester City	Loan
31 January 2008	(England) Ben Hutchinson	(England) Middlesbrough	£500,000
31 January 2008	(Scotland) Barry Robson	(Scotland) Dundee United	£1,200,000

=== Out ===
Date	Player	To	Fee
12 June 2007	(Northern Ireland) Neil Lennon	(England) Nottingham Forest	Free
3 July 2007	(Scotland) Craig Beattie	(England) West Bromwich Albion	£1,250,000
4 July 2007	(Scotland) David Marshall	(England) Norwich City	£750,000
2 August 2007	(Scotland) Andrew Traub	(Scotland) Clyde	Free
9 August 2007	(England) Alan Thompson	(England) Leeds United	Free
17 August 2007	(Scotland) Adam Virgo	(England) Colchester United	Loan
24 August 2007	(Scotland) Gary Irvine	(Scotland) St Johnstone	Free
30 August 2007	(Denmark) Thomas Gravesen	(England) Everton	Loan
31 August 2007	(Scotland) Kenny Miller	(England) Derby County	£2,250,000
31 August 2007	(Scotland) Michael Gardyne	(Scotland) Greenock Morton	Free
31 August 2007	(Scotland) Paul Lawson	(Scotland) Ross County	Free
1 September 2007	(Scotland) Craig Reid	(Scotland) Stirling Albion	Loan
1 September 2007	(Scotland) Rocco Quinn	(Scotland) St Johnstone	Loan
15 January 2008	(Scotland) Scott Fox	(Scotland) Ayr United	Loan
15 January 2008	(Iceland) Teddy Bjarnason	(Norway) Lyn Oslo	£300,000
31 January 2008	(Scotland) Craig Reid	(Scotland) Queen of the South	Free
31 January 2008	(Republic of Ireland) James O'Brien	(Scotland) Dundee United	Loan
31 January 2008	(Czech Republic) Jiří Jarošík	(Russia) Krylia Sovetov Samara	£750,000
31 January 2008	(Poland) Maciej Żurawski	(Greece) AEL	£500,000

- Expenditure: ▼£12,000,000
- Income: ▲£5,800,000
- Total loss/gain: ▼£6,200,000

== See also ==
- List of Celtic F.C. seasons
