= Jiří Jarošík =

Czech footballer and manager (born 1977)

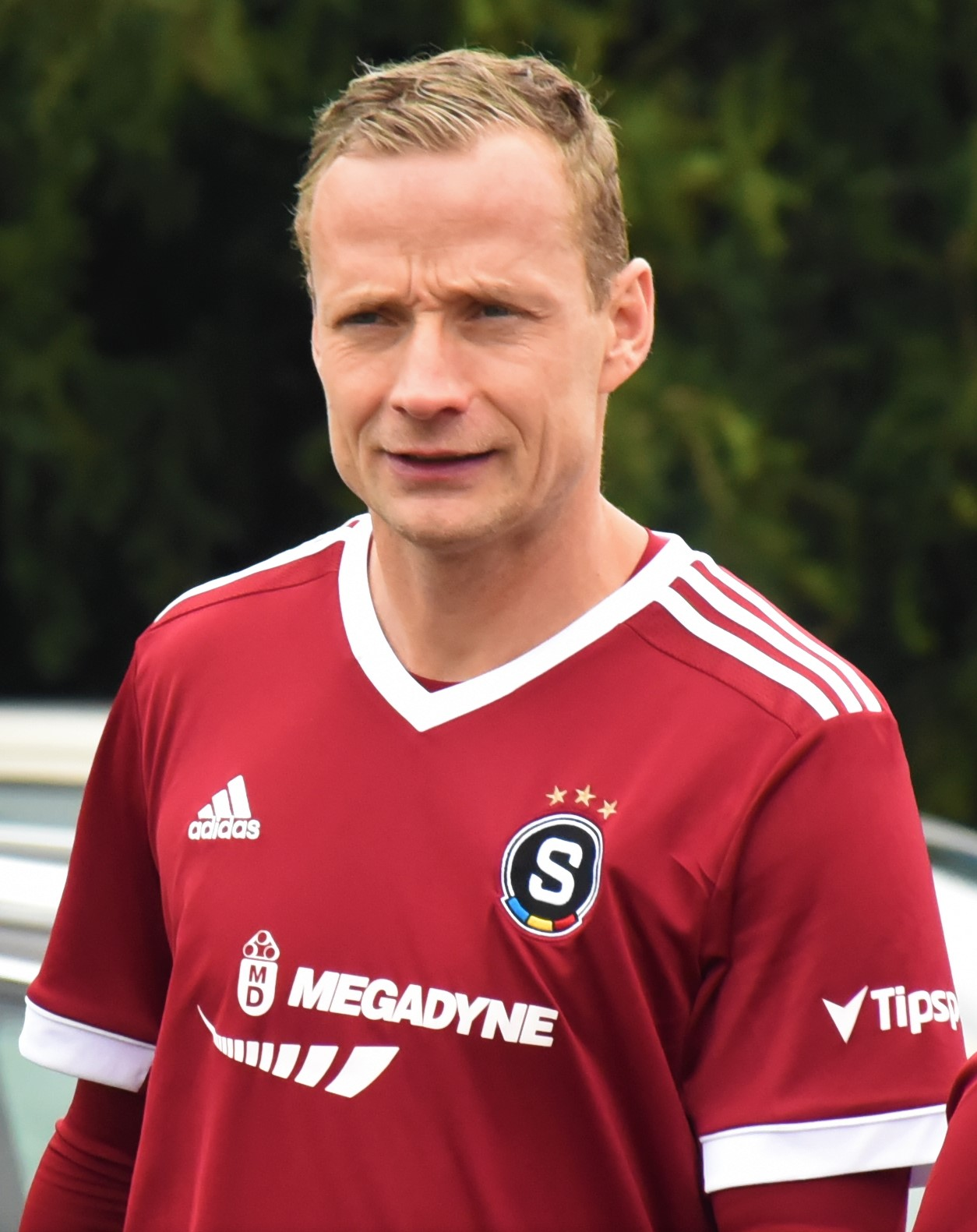
- Jarošík in 2021

Personal information
- Full name: Jiří Jarošík
- Date of birth: 27 October 1977 (age 48)
- Place of birth: Ústí nad Labem, Czechoslovakia
- Height: 1.95 m (6 ft 5 in)
- Positions: Defender; midfielder

Team information
- Current team: Shakhter Karagandy (manager)

Youth career
- 1985–1986: Komastav Chuderov
- 1986–1988: Ústí nad Labem
- 1988–1990: Teplice
- 1990–1996: Sparta Prague

Senior career*
Years	Team	Apps	(Gls)
1996–2003	Sparta Prague	101	(20)
1997–1999	→ Slovan Liberec (loan)	39	(2)
2003–2004	CSKA Moscow	55	(10)
2004–2006	Chelsea	14	(0)
2005–2006	→ Birmingham City (loan)	24	(5)
2006–2008	Celtic	33	(5)
2008–2010	Krylia Sovetov	47	(4)
2010–2011	Zaragoza	56	(5)
2011–2013	Sparta Prague	47	(5)
2013–2015	Alavés	52	(4)
Total		468	(60)

International career
1994	Czech Republic U16	2	(0)
1997	Czech Republic U20	6	(1)
1997–2000	Czech Republic U21	24	(4)
2000–2005	Czech Republic	23	(0)

Managerial career
- 2020: Ústí nad Labem
- 2020–2021: Celje
- 2021: Prostějov
- 2021–2023: Teplice
- 2023: Orenburg
- 2024–: Shakhter Karagandy
- * Club domestic league appearances and goals

Jiří Jarošík Czech pronunciation (born 27 October 1977) is a Czech professional football manager and former player who is the manager of Kazakhstani club Shakhter Karagandy. In his playing career, he played as a defender and midfielder.

Jarošík started his club career in his native Czech Republic, winning six league titles in seven years with Sparta Prague. He then played for CSKA Moscow, winning a Russian Premier League title in 2003. In January 2005 he transferred to Chelsea, where he won a Premier League title and was loaned to Birmingham City in the same league. He also won the Scottish Premier League with Celtic in 2006–07, while in his later career he returned to Russia with Krylia Sovetov, had a second spell at Sparta, and played in Spain for Real Zaragoza and Deportivo Alavés.

Jarošík played for the Czech national team, making 23 appearances without scoring between 2000 and 2005. Since 2020 he has worked as a manager, in the Czech Republic, Slovenia and Russia.

== Club career ==
=== Early career ===
Born in Ústí nad Labem, then Czechoslovakia, Jarošík began his career with Sparta Prague in his native Czech Republic. He had a two-year loan spell at Slovan Liberec before establishing himself in the first team at Sparta, with whom he won six league titles between 1997 and 2003. Jarošík's appearances caught the eye of CSKA Moscow, who paid a then Russian record of about $3.5 million to acquire him in 2003.

On 10 August 2004, Jarošík scored the winning goal in a 2–1 home victory over Rangers in the UEFA Champions League third qualifying round first leg (3–2 aggregate).

=== Chelsea ===
On 6 January 2005, Jarošík was purchased by Premier League club Chelsea for an undisclosed fee, thought to be about £3 million. He made his debut two days later in a 3–1 home win over League Two team Scunthorpe United in the third round of the FA Cup, as a 68th-minute substitute for Didier Drogba. On 27 February, he started the League Cup final, which Chelsea won 3–2 against Liverpool; he was replaced at half time by Eiður Guðjohnsen. Chelsea won the 2004–05 Premier League title and Jarošík made enough league appearances (14) to earn a championship medal.

Jarošík was involved in a controversy in February 2005 when he came on as a substitute with a 15-line handwritten note from manager José Mourinho, for midfielder Tiago Mendes, in a game at Everton that Chelsea ended up winning 1–0. Refereeing chief Keith Hackett stated that there was nothing to prevent the tactic in the Laws of the Game.

=== Birmingham City ===
On 22 August 2005, Jarošík was loaned to fellow Premier League team Birmingham City for the rest of the season. He had started only three league games for Chelsea (his only full match was the game in which they won the Premier League, away at Bolton Wanderers) and his chances of making Mourinho's starting lineup had further diminished since the signing of Michael Essien. Manager Steve Bruce praised Jarošík as a powerful and versatile player with good aerial ability. He made his debut the following day in a 3–0 home loss to Middlesbrough, and on 27 August he scored in a 3–2 win at West Midlands rivals West Bromwich Albion.

On 4 April 2006, Jarošík scored the only goal against Bolton at St Andrew's; his long-range strike past Jussi Jääskeläinen took Birmingham out of the relegation zone for the first time since October. He returned to Chelsea at the end of his loan, after Birmingham were relegated.

=== Celtic ===
On 19 June 2006, Jarošík left Chelsea and signed a three-year deal with Scottish Premier League champions Celtic for an undisclosed fee, rumoured to be around the £2 million mark. He scored on his Celtic debut in a 4–1 victory over Kilmarnock at Celtic Park on 29 July. Competition from other midfielders such as Evander Sno, Aiden McGeady and Paul Hartley meant that first team opportunities were limited for Jarošík, but he still made several notable contributions to Celtic's success, including winning both the free kicks from which Shunsuke Nakamura scored in the two Champions League group stage matches against Manchester United – the second put Celtic into the last 16. On 6 December 2006, Jarošík also scored Celtic's goal in a 3–1 Champions League group stage loss at Copenhagen. On 14 January 2007, he scored the winner in a 2–1 win over Hearts with a long-range strike. Celtic won the 2006–07 league title in Jarošík's first season with the club, meaning that he had won league medals in a joint-record four countries – the Czech Republic, Russia, England and Scotland.

Despite the signings of Massimo Donati and Scott Brown for the 2007–08 season, which made midfield competition even tighter than before, Jarošík remained with Celtic. On 3 October, Jarošík made his first Celtic start in over six months in the 2–1 Champions League group stage victory over A.C. Milan at Celtic Park. On 28 November, Jarošík scored Celtic's equaliser in another Champions League group stage match – this time against Shakhtar Donetsk – with a left-footed volley. The match ended 2–1 to Celtic.

In July 2023, Jarošík said he hated Scottish football and claimed that it was "30 years behind" the English game.

=== Krylia Sovetov ===
On 31 January 2008, Jarošík signed for Russian club Krylia Sovetov for a reported fee of €1 million.

=== Real Zaragoza ===
At the end of his Krylia Sovetov contract in December 2009, Jarošík returned to Sparta Prague to train, before being informed by a Serbian agent of interest from La Liga club Real Zaragoza. He had previously not heard of the team or the city of Zaragoza, but was convinced of their merits by compatriot Jiří Rosický, Tomáš Rosický's brother who had played for Atlético Madrid B.

On 13 January 2010, Jarošík signed for Zaragoza on a free transfer, on an 18-month deal. On his debut four days later, the team drew 0–0 at home to bottom team Xerez. His first goal was a 7th-minute header from Gabi's corner kick in a 1–1 draw with Atlético Madrid also at La Romareda.

Jarošík was sent off on 2 October 2010 in a 2–2 home draw with Sporting de Gijón, for fouling David Barral for a penalty that Diego Castro scored. The following May, as his contract was to expire, the Aragonese club offered him one more year. He said in 2016 that he turned down the offer as the club did not settle a debt with him.

=== Sparta Prague ===
On 13 August 2011, Jarošík re-signed with his former club Sparta Prague as a free agent.

=== Deportivo Alavés ===
On 26 August 2013, Jarošík signed as a free agent for Deportivo Alavés, newly promoted to Spain's Segunda División.

== International career ==
Jarošík played 23 times for the Czech Republic national team from 2000 to 2005, although he did not score and was not included in the squad for Euro 2004. His debut on 16 August 2000 was as a half-time substitute for captain Radek Bejbl in a 1–0 friendly loss to Slovenia in Ostrava.

== Coaching career ==
On 15 July 2020, 42-year-old Jarošík was hired for his first job as a head coach, at his hometown club Ústi nad Labem. He signed a one-year deal with the option of an extension and said that his late father would have been pleased with the appointment. On 25 December, with his team third in the second division, he moved to Celje, the defending champions of the Slovenian PrvaLiga who were in 7th place. Having won once and draw twice in eleven games, he was dismissed on 26 April 2021.

After starting the season in the second division with Prostějov, Jarošík moved in September 2021 to Teplice in the Czech top flight. He and his staff were dismissed on 4 March 2023, after a run of five losses in six games.

On 22 June 2023, Jarošík was hired by Russian Premier League club Orenburg. After only two months, five league matches, with one point and with last place in the league table, Jarošík left Orenburg due to family reasons.

On 5 November 2024, Jarošík was appointed as manager by Kazakhstan Premier League club Shakhter Karagandy.

== Personal life ==
Jarošík married Zlata Shvets in early 2014. His wife is from Russia.

== Managerial statistics ==
As of 22 August 2023

Managerial record by team and tenure
Team	From	To	Record				
Team	From	To	P	W	D	L	Win %
Ústí nad Labem	15 July 2020	25 December 2020	14	7	3	4	50.0
Celje	25 December 2020	26 April 2021	12	2	2	8	16.7
Orenburg	22 June 2023	22 August 2023	7	1	1	5	14.3
Total			33	10	6	17	30.30

== Honours ==
Sparta Prague

- Czech First League: 1996–97, 1997–98, 1998–99, 1999–2000, 2000–01, 2002–03

CSKA Moscow

- Russian Premier League: 2003
- Russian Super Cup: 2004

Chelsea

- Premier League: 2004–05
- Football League Cup: 2004–05

Celtic

- Scottish Premier League: 2006–07
- Scottish Cup: 2006–07
