= Evander Sno =

Dutch footballer (born 1987)

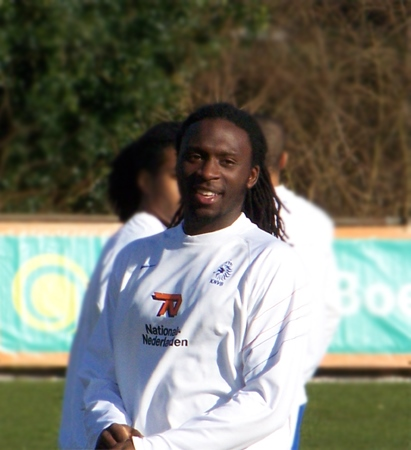
- Sno training with the Netherlands U21 in 2008

Personal information
- Date of birth: 9 April 1987 (age 39)
- Place of birth: Dordrecht, Netherlands
- Height: 1.89 m (6 ft 2 in)
- Position: Defensive midfielder

Youth career
- –2004: DWS
- 2004–2005: Ajax

Senior career*
Years	Team	Apps	(Gls)
2005–2006	Feyenoord	0	(0)
2005–2006	→ NAC Breda (loan)	14	(0)
2006–2008	Celtic	30	(1)
2008–2011	Ajax	19	(4)
2009–2010	→ Bristol City (loan)	24	(3)
2011–2012	RKC Waalwijk	25	(4)
2012–2013	NEC	7	(2)
2013–2014	RKC Waalwijk	23	(4)
2014	Westerlo	2	(0)
2015	ADO Den Haag	0	(0)
2017	RKC Waalwijk	18	(1)
2017–2018	DHSC		

International career
2007	Netherlands U21	15	(3)

Managerial career
- 2019: FC Lienden (assistant)
- * Club domestic league appearances and goals

Evander Sno (born 9 April 1987) is a Dutch football coach and former player. He played as a defensive midfielder.

During his active career, Sno played for numerous clubs in his native Netherlands, but also had spells in Scotland with Celtic and England on loan at Bristol City. He also featured for the Dutch under-21 and under-23 international teams. Sno typically played in a defensive midfield role, but was utilised in nine different field positions during a period on loan to NAC Breda. In addition, he was used as a striker for the Netherlands under 21s to cover for a lack of strikers in the squad at the time.

After his retirement as a footballer, Sno became an assistant coach at FC Lienden.

== Club career ==
=== Early career ===
Born in Dordrecht, Sno came through the youth system at Ajax but left to join Feyenoord at the age of eighteen. He did not play any first-team games during his time at Feyenoord but he was loaned out to NAC Breda during the 2005–06 season, where he made his name.

=== Celtic ===
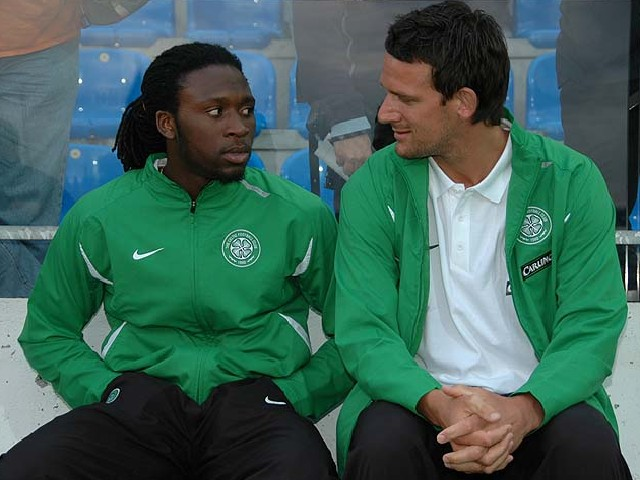
Sno (left) with fellow Dutchman Jan Vennegoor of Hesselink

Sno signed for Scottish Premier League side Celtic from Feyenoord of the Eredivisie in 2006. At the time he was considered one of the most promising youth prospects in the world. He made his full debut in a League Cup 3rd round victory over St Mirren, drawing praise from his manager for his performance and made his Old Firm debut during Celtic's 2–0 defeat of Rangers on 23 September 2006, replacing Shunsuke Nakamura during the latter stages of the match. In November 2006, Sno scored his only goal for Celtic against Hibernian in an SPL game. Sno went on to play in both legs of Celtic's Champions League last 16 defeat against AC Milan and at the end of the season collected an SPL winners medal after Celtic retained their title, a feat repeated in the 2007–08 season.

On signing for Celtic, it was widely reported in the media that Sno was named after the former Boxing World Heavyweight Champion, Evander Holyfield.

=== Ajax ===
In August 2008 Sno re-joined Ajax, signing a three-year contract. He was sent off in his debut match against Willem II Tilburg, although his red card was cleared by the KNVB. After just one season he was demoted from the first team and would play for Jong Ajax.

In August 2009, Sno had joined English club Bristol City on loan for the remainder of the 2009–10 season, making his debut as a substitute against Coventry City. Sno scored his first goal for Bristol City in a 3–2 win over Barnsley at Oakwell, and rejoined Ajax at the season's end.

When sent back to the reserves, Sno had to prove his self-worth as an Ajax first squad member. On 13 September 2010 while playing a match with Ajax' reserves against Vitesse/AGOVV reserves, Sno suffered a cardiac arrest. He was resuscitated, it took the paramedics ten minutes to resuscitate Sno on the pitch and he was then taken to a hospital in Arnhem. It was expected that a long period of recovery was going to lie ahead, and he marked his return by appearing in a reserve friendly on 11 November 2010. No direct cause for the cardiac arrest could be found and as a precaution he had an internal cardiac defibrillator placed inside his body.

After his contract with Ajax expired, Sno found an agreement with Italian Serie A club Genoa; the move was however canceled at the last minute after the player failed his medical.

=== Later career and retirement ===
In August 2011, Sno signed a one-year contract with Eredivisie side RKC Waalwijk. Due to his good performances at RKC Waalwijk, several Dutch teams showed interest in Sno. Both Eredivisie teams Roda JC and NEC Nijmegen wanted to sign a contract with him. He signed a two-year contract with NEC at 6 June 2012. Once again, on 29 September 2012, Sno suffered another on-pitch cardiac arrest, however, due to having a defibrillator fitted previously, he was able to walk off the pitch. On 3 April 2013, Sno ended his contract with NEC because of a disagreement with the club.

On 28 October 2013, Sno signed a deal until the end of the season with his former club RKC. After they were relegated to the Dutch Eerste Divisie, Sno left as a free agent and signed with Belgian side Westerlo on 4 June 2014. However, he only played two matches in half a season and dissolved his contract on 7 December 2014.

On 31 January 2015, it was announced that Sno would sign a contract until the end of the season with Dutch Eredivisie side ADO Den Haag. After another spell at RKC, he joined Dutch Eerste Klasse amateur club DHSC in July 2017. He announced his retirement in 2018.

== International career ==
Born in the Netherlands, Sno is of Surinamese descent. Sno was a regular in the Dutch Under-21 team. In October 2006, Sno was handed a surprise callup for the Netherlands national football squad for the friendly against England national team, Sno was unused in the game On 16 July 2008, he was named in the Dutch squad for the Olympic Games in Beijing. In the opening game against Nigeria, Sno received a red card.

== Coaching career ==
In January 2019, six months after announcing his retirement as a player, Sno was appointed as assistant coach to FC Lienden head coaches Hans van de Haar and Nordin Wooter.

== Personal life ==
In January 2019, Sno was sentenced to community service for knocking out a bouncer in a nightclub brawl at the Melkweg concert venue in October 2017. His brother, Kenneth, was fined for threatening to shoot security staff in the same incident.

== Honours ==
Celtic

- Scottish Premier League: 2006–07, 2007–08
- Scottish Cup: 2006–07

Ajax

- Eredivisie: 2010–11
