= Jean-Joël Perrier-Doumbé =

Cameroonian footballer (born 1978)

Personal information
- Date of birth: 27 September 1978 (age 48)
- Place of birth: Paris, France
- Height: 1.80 m (5 ft 11 in)
- Position: Right-back

Senior career*
Years	Team	Apps	(Gls)
1999–2004	Auxerre	50	(0)
2004–2007	Rennes	56	(0)
2007	→ Celtic (loan)	4	(0)
2007–2009	Celtic	2	(0)
2009–2011	Toulouse	3	(0)
Total		115	(1)

International career
2003–2006	Cameroon	20	(0)
- * Club domestic league appearances and goals

Jean-Joël Perrier-Doumbé (born 27 September 1978) is a former professional footballer who played as a right-back. Born in France, he gained 20 caps for Cameroon, qualifying through heritage.

== Club career ==
=== Early career ===
Born in Paris, Perrier-Doumbé started his career at Auxerre, making over 50 first-team appearances before moving to Rennes in 2004. He quickly became a first-team regular at the Stade de la Route de Lorient, making 27 appearances in Ligue 1 in the 2005–06 season.

However, the Cameroon international found first team opportunities limited during the first half of the 2006–07 campaign after missing the opening stages of the season due to an arm injury sustained in a pre-season friendly. The arrival of Dutch defender Mario Melchiot provided strong competition for the right-back berth and Perrier-Doumbé was linked with moves away.

=== Loan spell with Celtic ===
On 12 January 2007, it was reported that Perrier-Doumbé had been on trial with Celtic, while Premier League side Bolton Wanderers were also credited with an interest. On 25 January, it was confirmed that Perrier-Doumbé would join Celtic, initially on loan until the end of the season, with an option to sign for an additional two years after the completion of the loan.

On arrival at Celtic, Perrier-Doumbé found first team opportunities limited and began as a reserve team player. However, injuries to Mark Wilson and Gary Caldwell gave the Cameroonian a chance and he made his way into the first team, although not until after Celtic had already won the league. He scored the winning goal in the Scottish Cup final against Dunfermline Athletic on 26 May 2007, his first senior goal in club football.

In July 2007, after his contract with Rennes expired, it was reported that Perrier-Doumbé was in talks with Sheffield United on the recommendation of Celtic manager Gordon Strachan after he had refused to pay a fee for Perrier-Doumbé. Celtic were expected to sign him on a three-year deal but, due to a clause in the loan contract, the club would have had to pay £400,000; any other club was available to sign him for free.

However, after playing for the Blades in a pre-season friendly against Alfreton Town, manager Bryan Robson decided not to offer him a contract.

=== Permanent deal with Celtic ===
On 11 August 2007, Perrier-Doumbé signed for Celtic until the end of the season. Perrier-Doumbé tore his Achilles tendon during a Champions League match against AC Milan on 3 October and was sidelined for nearly six months. He made his comeback for the Celtic reserve team against Gretna on 24 March 2008. Whilst out injured, the club honoured him with a year's extension on his contract, tying him up until the end of the 2008–09 season.

=== Toulouse ===
On 7 October 2009, Perrier-Doumbé returned to France and signed a two-year deal with Toulouse. He left the club in 2011.

== Career statistics ==
=== Club ===
Appearances and goals by club, season and competition
Club	Season	League			National cup		League cup		Continental		Other		Total	
Club	Season	Division	Apps	Goals	Apps	Goals	Apps	Goals	Apps	Goals	Apps	Goals	Apps	Goals
Auxerre	2000–01	Division 1	10	0			1	0			–		11	0
Auxerre	2001–02	Division 1	5	0			2	0	–		–		7	0
Auxerre	2002–03	Ligue 1	18	0			1	0	0	0	–		19	0
Auxerre	2003–04	Ligue 1	17	0			0	0	6	0	–		23	0
Auxerre	Total		50	0			4	0	6	0	0	0	60	0
Rennes	2004–05	Ligue 1	26	0			0	0	–		–		26	0
Rennes	2005-06	Ligue 1	28	0			0	0	2	0	–		30	0
Rennes	2006–07	Ligue 1	2	0			0	0	–		–		2	0
Rennes	Total		56	0			0	0	2	0	0	0	58	0
Celtic	2006–07	Scottish Premier League	4	0	1	1	0	0	0	0	–		5	1
Celtic	2007–08	Scottish Premier League	2	0	0	0	0	0	1	0	–		3	0
Celtic	Total		6	0	1	1	0	0	1	0	0	0	8	1
Toulouse	2009–10	Ligue 1	3	0			0	0	–		–		3	0
Career total			115	0	1	1	4	0	9	0	0	0	129	1

=== International ===
Appearances and goals by national team and year
National team	Year	Apps	Goals
Cameroon	2003	7	0
Cameroon	2004	11	0
Cameroon	2005	1	0
Cameroon	2006	1	0
Total		20	0

== Honours ==
Auxerre

- Coupe de France: 2003

Celtic

- Scottish Cup: 2007
