= Shunsuke Nakamura =

Japanese footballer (born 1978)

Shunsuke Nakamura 中村 俊輔
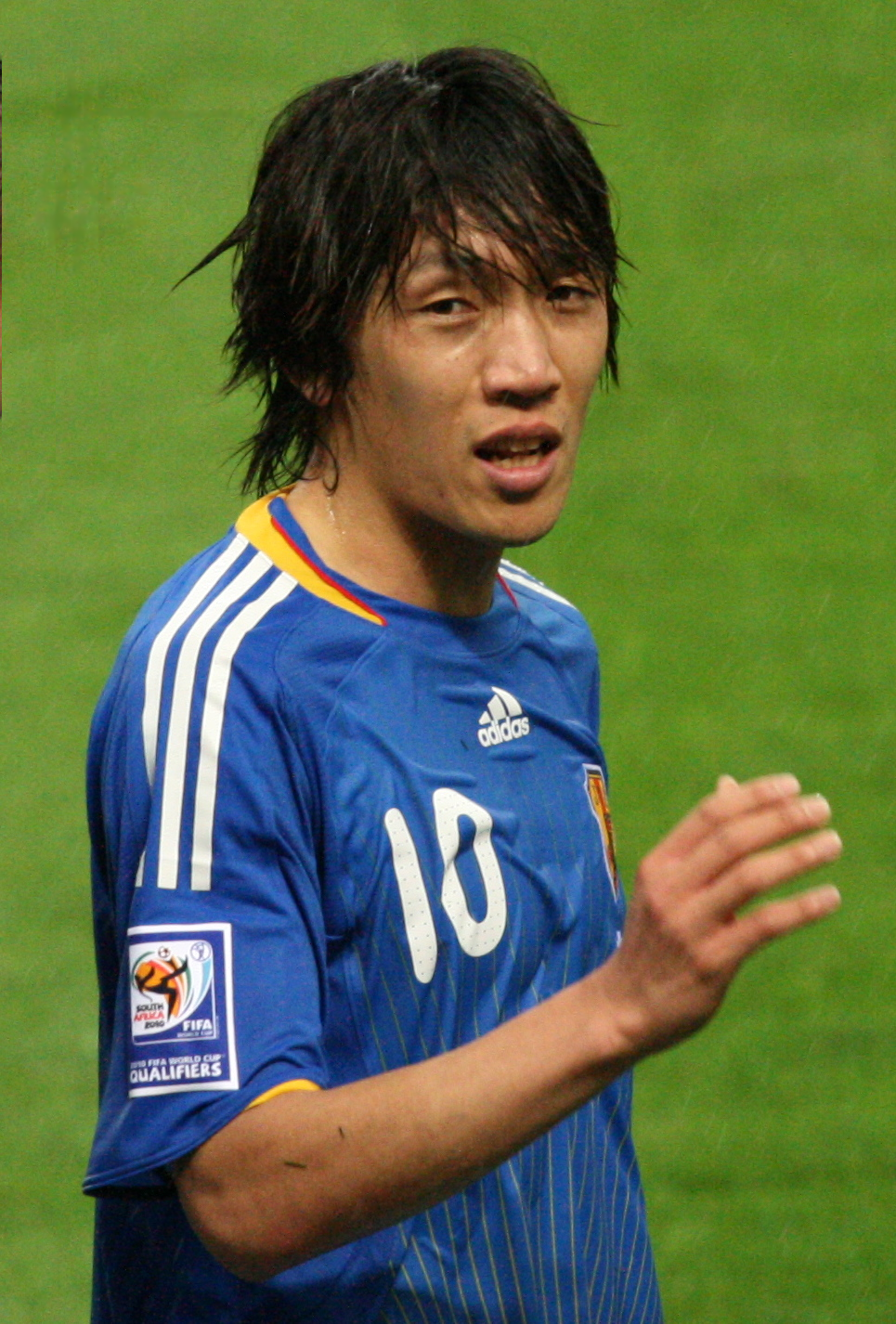
- Nakamura with Japan in 2008

Personal information
- Date of birth: 24 June 1978 (age 48)
- Place of birth: Yokohama, Kanagawa, Japan
- Height: 1.78 m (5 ft 10 in)
- Position: Attacking midfielder

Team information
- Current team: Japan (Assistant coach)

Youth career
- 1991–1993: Yokohama F. Marinos
- 1994–1996: Toko Gakuen High School

Senior career*
Years	Team	Apps	(Gls)
1997–2002	Yokohama F. Marinos	148	(33)
2002–2005	Reggina	81	(11)
2005–2009	Celtic	128	(29)
2009–2010	Espanyol	13	(0)
2010–2017	Yokohama F. Marinos	190	(35)
2017–2019	Júbilo Iwata	48	(5)
2019–2022	Yokohama FC	38	(1)
Total		646	(115)

International career
1997	Japan U-20	5	(1)
2000	Japan U-23	4	(0)
2000–2010	Japan	98	(24)

Managerial career
- 2023–2026: Yokohama FC
Medal record
Representing Japan
AFC Asian Cup
Winner	2000 Lebanon
Winner	2004 China
- * Club domestic league appearances and goals

Shunsuke Nakamura (Japanese: 中村 俊輔, Hepburn: Nakamura Shunsuke; born 24 June 1978) is a Japanese former professional footballer. He is currently working as an assistant coach of the Japan national football team. He is the only person to have been named J.League Most Valuable Player more than once, receiving the award in 2000 and 2013. Renowned as one of Japan's greatest ever footballers, Nakamura was known for his free-kicks; Steve Perryman once remarked that Nakamura "could open a tin of beans with his left foot".

Nakamura began his professional career with J1 League club Yokohama Marinos in 1997, (Note: The Marinos would later merge with Yokohama Flügels and take on their current name, Yokohama F. Marinos, in 1999.) eventually making 338 league appearances during two spells at the club totalling just over twelve seasons. In between his spells at Marinos, Nakamura played in Europe with Espanyol, Celtic, and Reggina. During his time at Celtic, he became one of the best Asian players to have ever played in Europe; he was nominated for the 2007 Ballon d'Or, was named Scottish Player of the Year and SFWA Footballer of the Year in 2007, and became the first Japanese player to score in the UEFA Champions League. (Note: "UEFA Champions League" referring to the modern era of the competition; Yasuhiko Okudera, who scored for 1. FC Köln against Nottingham Forest in the 1978–79 European Cup semi-final, was the first Japanese player (and first Asian player) to score in the European Cup.) His team accomplishments at Celtic include winning the Scottish Premier League in 2006, 2007, and 2008, the Scottish League Cup in 2006 and 2009, and the Scottish Cup in 2007.

Nakamura has 98 caps and 24 goals for the Japan national football team, including appearances in the FIFA World Cup finals in 2006 and 2010 and winning the AFC Asian Cup in 2000 and 2004; he was named Most Valuable Player of the 2004 competition. He also appeared in the 1997 FIFA World Youth Championship as a member of the Japan under-20 team and the 2000 Summer Olympics as a member of the Japan under-23 team.

== Early life ==
Born and raised in Yokohama, Japan, Nakamura began playing football competitively at age 5 with local junior club side Misono FC, where his playmaking abilities already garnered attention from locals. In fifth grade, he was selected for Yokohama's city junior all-star team's tour of the Soviet Union, even though the team was only meant to include sixth graders.

At age 12 in 1991, Nakamura joined the youth setup of Nissan Motors F.C., one of the predecessors of the club known today as Yokohama F. Marinos. While training at the youth setup, Nakamura was already honing his dead-ball technique, practising free kicks for an hour every day outside of team practice; his coaches also acknowledged he had good ball skills and technique. However, at that time Nakamura was physically underdeveloped compared to his teammates and struggled to transition to the youth level, and eventually was not chosen for the youth team.

Rather than continue on the fringes of Nissan's youth setup, Nakamura instead decided to enroll at Tōkō Gakuen High School in Kawasaki, despite the school being a two-and-a-half-hour commute each way. Nakamura led Tōkō Gakuen to Japan's national high school football tournament in 1995 and to the tournament final in 1996. It was his performance there that earned him a call-up to the Japan under-20 team for the 1996 AFC Youth Championship and subsequently for the 1997 FIFA World Youth Championship.

By his graduation from Tōkō Gakuen in 1997, Nakamura had attracted interest from several top-flight Japanese clubs, including offers from Júbilo Iwata, Verdy Kawasaki, and Gamba Osaka.

== Club career ==
=== Yokohama Marinos ===
In 1997, Nakamura chose to sign with J.League Division 1 club Yokohama Marinos, the club whose youth setup he had left only a few years earlier. Nakamura made his début with Marinos on 8 March in a J.League Cup match against Verdy Kawasaki and his league début on 16 April against Gamba Osaka. Nakamura finished his rookie season with 31 appearances and 5 goals.

Nakamura had his break-out season the following year in 1998, making 37 appearances and scoring 10 goals; his playmaking ability in creating scoring chances for teammates also contributed to Nakamura being considered one of the best young players in Japan. In 2000, Nakamura had his best season in Yokohama, recording 5 goals and 11 assists in league play, helping Marinos to the first-stage championship; Nakamura was awarded J.League Most Valuable Player for his contributions. The following year, Nakamura made 31 appearances and scored 5 goals in all competitions, including 6 appearances and 2 goals in the 2001 J.League Cup, which the Marinos won.

Due to his success, Nakamura became the subject of transfer target rumours from a number of European clubs including Real Madrid and several Lega Calcio sides such as Reggina, Chievo, Perugia, Napoli, Lecce, and Atalanta. Nakamura felt he had to leave Japan and play in Europe to further develop and advance his career, especially after the disappointment of being left off of Japan's 2002 World Cup squad. Nakamura left Marinos partway through the 2002 season to join Reggina, newly promoted to Serie A, after the clubs agreed to a 6-month loan and US$3.5 million transfer fee. Prior to his departure from Marinos, Nakamura remained in top form, scoring 4 goals in 8 appearances.

=== Reggina ===
Nakamura had come to the attention of Reggina scouts after an international match against Honduras during the 2002 Kirin Cup in which he had scored two goals. Reggina gained promotion to Serie A after the 2001–02 season and had already been looking to sign a marquee player for some time. On the day Reggina secured promotion, then-Chairman Pasquale Foti supposedly called the Marinos to inquire about a Nakamura transfer while Reggina's players were still on the pitch celebrating.

Expectations for Nakamura were very high; the prestigious number 10 shirt was taken from teammate Francesco Cozza and given to Nakamura, and the club sold 25,000 Nakamura shirts in the first five months he was at the club. Nakamura responded by scoring in three consecutive matches early in the season; in league play, he finished the season with 32 appearances and tied for the team lead with seven goals, helping Reggina narrowly avoid relegation (Reggina defeated Atalanta in the relegation playoff).

Nakamura struggled with injuries in 2003 and was limited to just 18 appearances in the 2003–04 season (these injuries also caused him to miss a 2003 Confederations Cup game against Colombia and national team duty in November 2003). Additionally, Reggina underwent four managerial changes in just Nakamura's first two years at the club; Walter Mazzarri, hired in the summer of 2004, would already be Nakamura's fifth manager at Reggina. The frequent changes resulted in Nakamura mostly coming off the bench during the 2003–04 season and not fitting in well under Mazzarri in 2004–05 when Reggina only scored 36 goals in their entire league campaign, with Nakamura only managing to contribute two goals (although each came in crucial 1–0 league victories in a season where Reggina finished only 2 points clear of the relegation zone). Coupled with Reggina's struggle to avoid relegation every season that he had been at the club, Nakamura became concerned he was regressing from top-level football and decided it was time to move on.

=== Celtic ===
Nakamura expressed interest in playing in Spain and media reports linked him to La Liga sides Atlético Madrid and Deportivo as well as Bundesliga clubs Borussia Dortmund and Borussia Mönchengladbach in the summer of 2005. Other European clubs including Leeds United, Lazio, and Parma reportedly had also expressed interest during Nakamura's time at Reggina, but Nakamura ultimately chose to join Scottish Premier League runners-up Celtic.

New manager Gordon Strachan became interested in acquiring Nakamura due to his national team appearances in the 2005 Confederations Cup, in particular for his performance against Brazil in which Nakamura scored a goal and helped Japan to a 2–2 draw. The deal with Celtic was completed on 29 July 2005 for a reported transfer fee of £2.5 million, although Strachan has claimed the actual fee was far lower; part of the discrepancy may be due to the deal involving Celtic securing the player's image rights with a view to enhancing the club's profile and merchandising sales in the Far East. In welcoming Nakamura to the club, Strachan stated that Nakamura "has got imagination and he sees passes other people can't see."

==== 2005–06 season ====
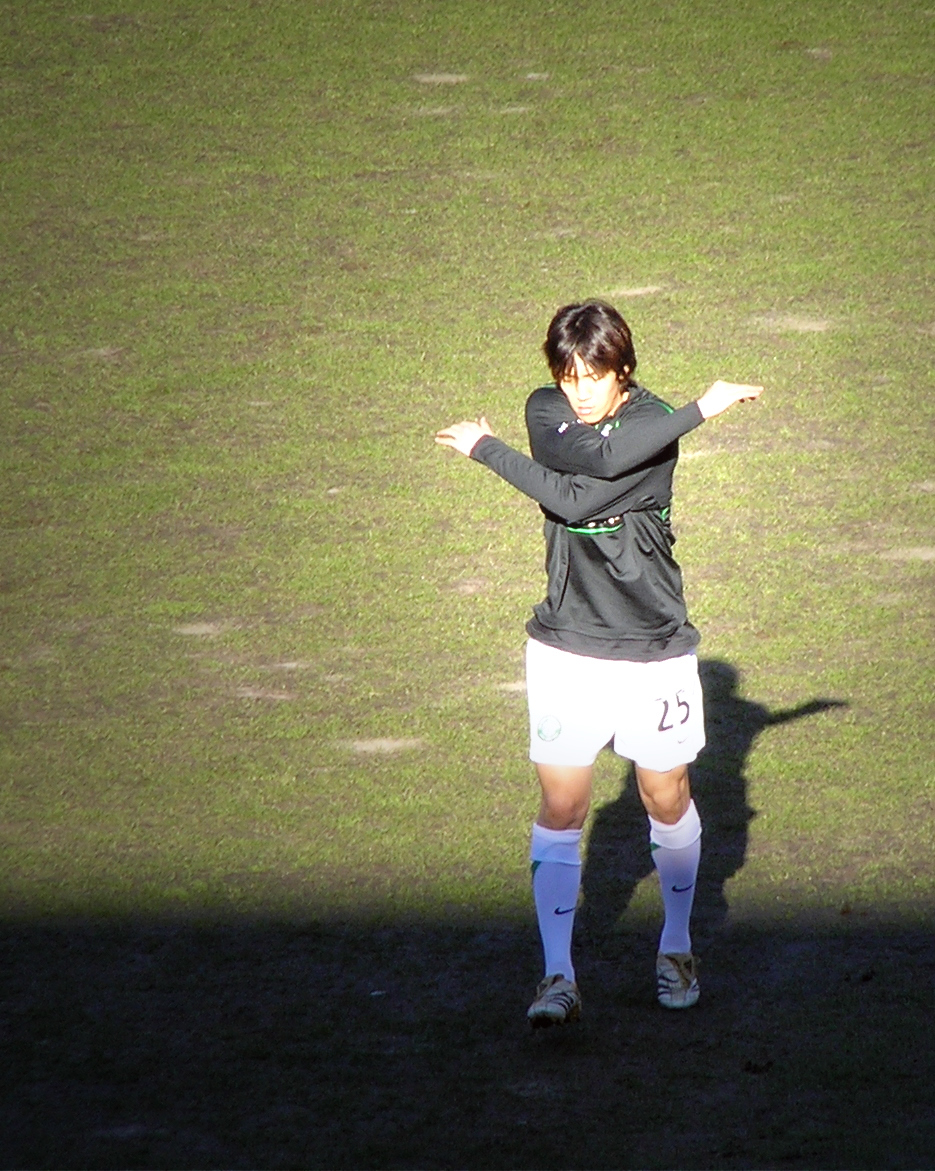
Nakamura warming up ahead of Celtic's clash with Dundee United on 6 August 2005

Nakamura joined Celtic at a time of relative crisis for the club and new manager Strachan. Celtic had been eliminated from European competition after being unable to overcome a shock 0–5 first leg defeat to Artmedia Bratislava in the second qualifying round of the 2005–06 Champions League and also had an inauspicious start to the league season, needing an injury time equaliser from Craig Beattie just to draw with Motherwell in the league opener. For this reason, Strachan immediately inserted Nakamura into the match day line-up for the second league game of the season against Dundee United on 6 August, despite Nakamura not being match fit as he had not played since the Confederations Cup earlier in the summer. Nevertheless, Nakamura had an excellent debut and was named Man of the Match, earning a standing ovation from the home Celtic support when he was substituted in the 84th minute. Both Tommy Burns and Neil Lennon, at the time first-team coach and club captain, respectively, have credited Nakamura's arrival at Celtic with helping turn around Celtic's disappointing start to the season.

Nakamura finished his debut season at Celtic with 38 appearances, 6 goals, and 10 assists. His creativity, as well as his work ethic and composure under pressure, won praise from teammates, manager Gordon Strachan and Celtic supporters. In reviewing Nakamura's debut season, Strachan said that Nakamura's "touch and vision were outstanding... In goal assists, I really do not think there is a player in Scotland to touch him." In his first season with Celtic, Nakamura won his first major club titles, the Scottish Premier League and Scottish League Cup.

==== 2006–07 season ====
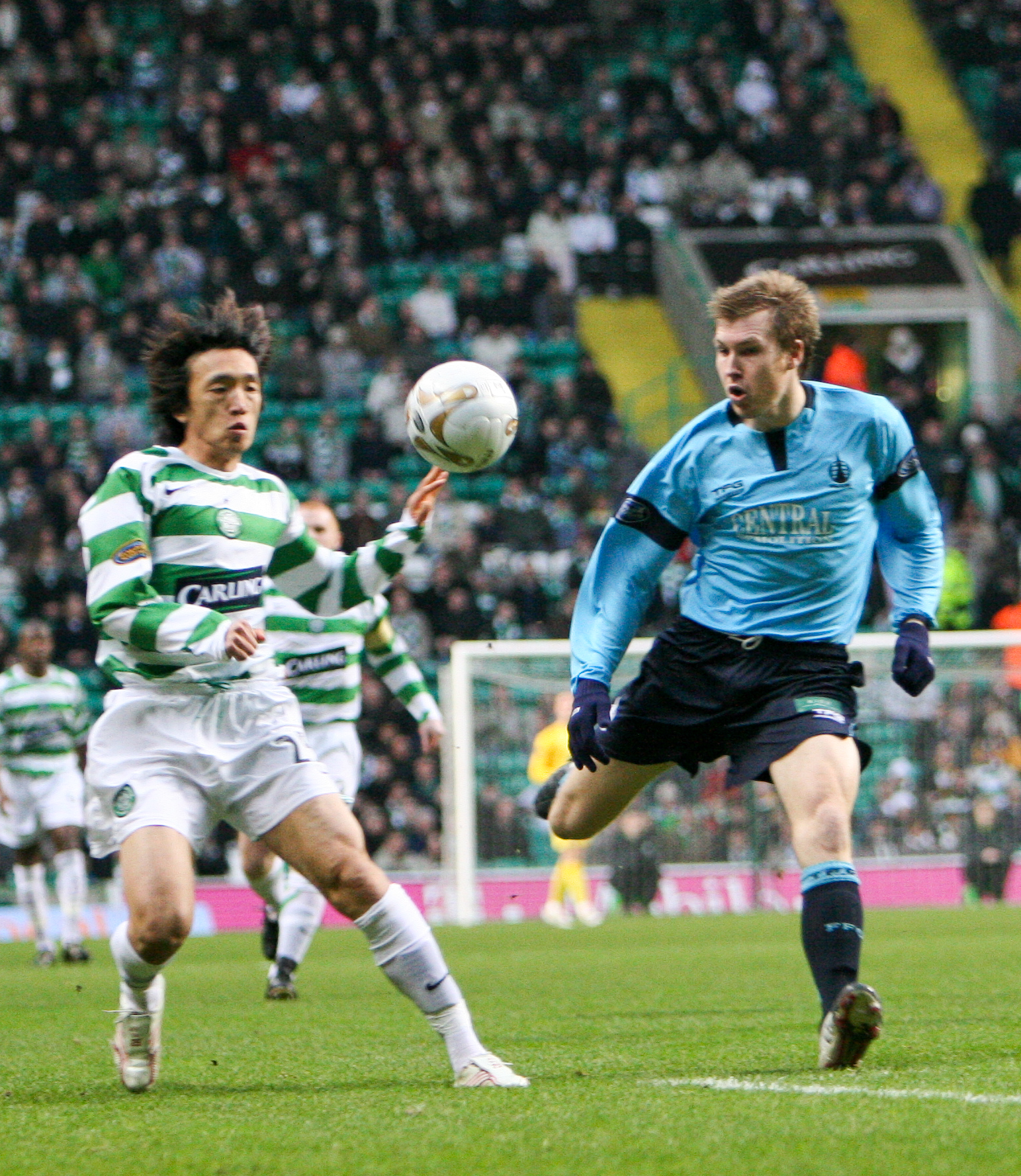
Nakamura (left) battling for the ball with Karl Dodd of Falkirk during a match in December 2006

In his second season at Celtic, Nakamura played his debut Champions League game on 13 September against Manchester United at Old Trafford. He scored from a free kick to bring the game level at 2–2, making him the first Japanese footballer to score a goal in the Champions League, although Celtic eventually lost 3–2. On 14 October, in a league game against Dundee United at Tannadice, Nakamura scored the first hat-trick of his Celtic career and won the Man of the Match award; the game ended 4–1 in Celtic's favour.

On 21 November, Nakamura scored perhaps the most important goal of his career with a 30-yard free kick against Manchester United at Celtic Park in a crucial Champions League game, leading to Celtic qualifying for the Champions League knockout stage for the first time. Sky Sports pundit and Southampton legend Matt Le Tissier later ranked Nakamura's free kick as among the best five set-piece goals he has ever seen. On 26 December, Nakamura chipped the ball over Dundee United's goalkeeper Derek Stillie at Celtic Park; the goal earned Nakamura the SPL Goal of the Season award. It was Nakamura's performance in the final 20 minutes of the game which allowed Celtic to escape with a point, prompting Gordon Strachan to proclaim him "a genius".

On 25 February, during the Scottish Cup quarter-final between Celtic and Inverness Caledonian Thistle, Nakamura broke a bone in his left hand after an Inverness player stepped on it. Nevertheless, Nakamura played in the next game on 3 March against Dunfermline Athletic. Hoops manager Gordon Strachan insisted that Celtic couldn't play the second leg of the Champions League match against A.C. Milan in the San Siro without him. He played in both legs of the fixture, the first of which was a 0–0 draw at Celtic Park, with Milan going on to win the tie 1–0 after extra-time at the San Siro.

On 22 April, Celtic won their 41st league championship, and second in a row. The title was won in dramatic fashion by an injury time free kick from Nakamura in a 2–1 victory against Kilmarnock. The result left Celtic 13 points clear of Rangers with four matches remaining. Quite fittingly, later that day Nakamura was recognised by his peers with the Scottish Player of the Year award. This was followed in May with the SFWA Footballer of the Year award and both Players' Player of the Year award and the Fans' Player of the Year award at Celtic's own end of season awards ceremony.

Due to Nakamura's form, transfer rumours again swirled during the summer window suggesting that Nakamura might exercise a release clause in his contract to join one of Europe's other elite clubs, including Liverpool; however, Nakamura reiterated his desire to remain at Celtic.

==== 2007–08 season ====
Nakamura featured little in the first part of Celtic's 2007–08 campaign due to a knee injury which was initially picked up in a Champions League qualifying match against Spartak Moscow in August 2007. Nakamura attempted to play through the injury, including coming on as an 85th-minute substitute in a Champions League group stage match against A.C. Milan and being involved in the buildup to Scott McDonald's injury time winner. However, Nakamura wound up repeatedly aggravating the injury, including in a match against Motherwell on 27 October, after which an MRI revealed nerve damage next to a knee ligament and Nakamura sat out for nearly three months. During this time, Celtic slipped from the top of the table into second place; teammate Artur Boruc called Nakamura's absence the "big difference" in Celtic's drop in form. Nakamura returned to play on 12 January, for Celtic's Scottish Cup match against Stirling Albion, in which he scored a goal.

On 16 April, in a crucial Old Firm league game that Celtic had to win in order to prevent Glasgow rivals Rangers from winning the league title, Nakamura scored his first goal against Rangers, making him the first ever Japanese player to score in an Old Firm game. Typically, it was a fantastic goal, this time being a 30-yard volley. He later had a goal bound effort cleared off the line by a Carlos Cuéllar handball in the same match; although McDonald missed the ensuing penalty, Celtic eventually won the game 2–1. Celtic won the league title on the last day of the season, their third title in a row.

==== 2008–09 season ====
On 13 September 2008, Nakamura played his 100th Scottish Premier League match in a 4–2 victory against Motherwell.

On 28 February 2009, he scored a hat trick against St Mirren in a 7–0 win.

=== Espanyol ===
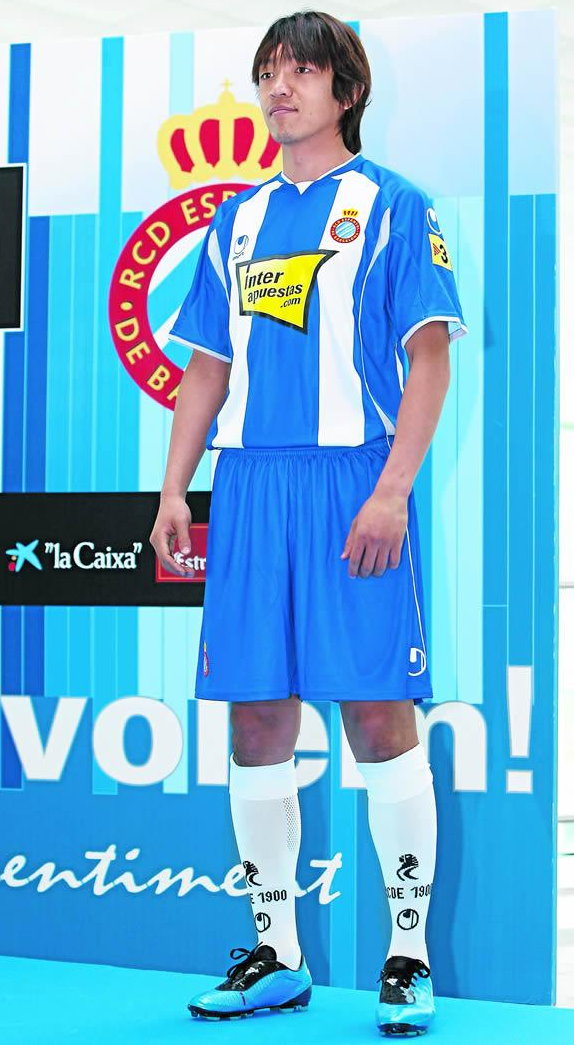
Nakamura during his presentation at Espanyol in August 2009

Media assumed that Nakamura would return to his hometown club Yokohama F. Marinos after his four-year contract with Celtic expired at the end of June 2009; however, negotiations broke down over contract terms. On 22 June, Nakamura instead agreed to a two-year contract with La Liga side Espanyol.

Nakamura made his debut with Espanyol in the first league match of the 2009–10 season against Athletic Bilbao, playing the entire game. However, as the season went on Nakamura lost his place in the first team, spending significant time on the bench and with most of his appearances being as a substitute.

By December, Espanyol staff expressed concerns about Nakamura's slow adaptation to Spain and Spanish football, with manager Mauricio Pochettino even suggesting that most of the issues were cultural. Despite assurances from Espanyol as late as January that Nakamura still had a future at the club, Espanyol acknowledged that during the winter transfer window they had accepted a bid from Middlesbrough, who wanted to reunite Nakamura with new manager Gordon Strachan but there were questions about whether Nakamura would accept playing for a club in the second tier. By the following month Espanyol had transfer-listed Nakamura; media reports cited language and communication problems. On 26 February, Marinos agreed to a €1 million transfer fee. Nakamura acknowledged that his return to Marinos was largely due to ensuring playing time so that he would be selected and ready for the 2010 World Cup.

=== Yokohama F. Marinos ===
Nakamura rejoined Yokohama F. Marinos for the 2010 J.League season - 8 years after leaving the club to play in Europe. Nakamura appeared in 32 of Marinos' 34 league games in his first season back at the club, including 31 starts and 5 goals.

In 2011, Nakamura was appointed captain of Marinos and led the club to its best point total (56) since Marinos last won the league in 2004.

During the 2013 season, Nakamura made 33 appearances and scored 10 goals in league play. He also made 10 appearances and scored 2 goals in the 2013 Emperor's Cup, which the Marinos won. His league goal tally included a free kick goal against Oita Trinita on 27 October, Nakamura's 17th direct free kick goal in J1 League, surpassing Yasuhito Endo for the all-time league record. (Note: Records are for the J1 League, reflecting statistics during the professional era of top-flight Japanese football since its formation in 1992.) However, Nakamura was sidelined with injury late in the season and the Marinos lost three of their final four games, finishing one point behind Sanfrecce Hiroshima in the title race. Nakamura described Marinos' collapse as the "worst moment" of his career. Nevertheless, Nakamura was awarded J.League Most Valuable Player for his contributions, becoming the first and only multiple-time winner and, at the time, the oldest recipient of the award. (Note: In 2016, Kengo Nakamura surpassed Shunsuke Nakamura as oldest J.League MVP recipient.)

During the 2016 season, Nakamura became the longest-serving captain in Marinos history, passing Masami Ihara. He also scored free kick goals against Avispa Fukuoka on 5 March and against Gamba Osaka on 2 April, his 21st and 22nd direct free kick goals in J.League, further extending the all-time league record.

After the end of the 2016 season, J1 League rivals Júbilo Iwata made a multi-year contract offer to Nakamura. This led to media speculation in December that Nakamura was unhappy at Marinos due to interference in both player and staff personnel decisions by City Football Group, who had taken a 20% stake in Marinos in 2014. Júbilo Iwata confirmed signing Nakamura on 8 January. Nakamura reiterated his desire to retire with boyhood club Marinos - the only club he had played for in J.League - and expressed disappointment that he never won a league title with Marinos, but cited the ongoing stakeholder interference as creating an atmosphere where "every day there were things I felt were wrong" and he could not "face football properly". Nakamura reportedly accepted an annual wage of ¥80 million from Júbilo Iwata despite a contract extension offer from Marinos worth ¥120 million annually. Marinos general manager Takao Toshishige publicly expressed regret at the club's failure to re-sign Nakamura, saying "We absolutely cannot allow something like this to happen again." A Marinos official reportedly stated that due to Nakamura's popularity with fans, his departure could result in a one-third drop in Marinos annual revenue.

=== Júbilo Iwata ===
Nakamura joined Júbilo Iwata for the 2017 season. He scored his first goal for Júbilo in a match against Omiya Ardija on 11 March, scoring from a direct free kick to bring his record J.League tally to 23; the goal was later nominated for J.League Goal of the Month for the February–March period. Nakamura followed up the nomination by winning J.League Goal of the Month for April for his 30-yard strike against Kashima Antlers on 22 April. However his opportunity to play decreased in 2018 season. In 2019 season, he played only 2 matches until July.

=== Yokohama FC ===
On 11 July 2019, Nakamura moved to J2 League club Yokohama FC. As he immediately become one of the most experienced figures in the locker room, alongside Kazuyoshi Miura, Nakamura made six appearances in the 2019 season, scoring one goal as Yokohama finished second in the league (behind only title winners Kashiwa Reysol) and went on to win promotion back to the J1 League.

After ten more appearances during the 2020 season, with his team finishing 15th in the table, during the 2021 season Nakamura played twelve more matches (plus one game each in the League Cup and the Emperor's Cup) as Yokohama finished bottom of the league and got relegated. However, on 22 December 2021, the club announced that the midfielder had just extended his contract with them for one more year.

=== Retirement ===
Nakamura announced his retirement from football on 17 October 2022.

== International career ==
=== Youth national teams ===
Nakamura's national team career with Japan started in 1996 as the only high school player selected to the Under-19 team for the Asia Youth Championship. The following year, he was a member of Japan's Under-20 team that finished in the final 8 of the 1997 World Youth Championship.

In 1999, Nakamura was selected a member of Japan's Under-23 team that won all its Asian qualifying matches in the run up to the 2000 Olympic Games in Sydney. Nakamura formed a lethal combination in the attacking midfield with Shinji Ono on a team that would form the core of the Japan national team, and included Atsushi Yanagisawa, Junichi Inamoto and Naohiro Takahara. In Sydney, Japan reached the quarterfinal round.

=== Under Troussier ===
Nakamura made his senior national team debut on 13 February 2000, in an Asian Cup qualifier match against Singapore. He scored his first national team goal against Brunei in the very next match on 16 February 2000, also in Asian Cup qualifying.

After playing a key role in Japan's championship at the 2000 Asian Cup, Nakamura appeared to have cemented his place in the national team, having played every match of the tournament. However, his national team career took a sharp turn in a friendly match on 25 March 2001, a humiliating 5–0 loss to France. He did not play for the team led by manager Philippe Troussier again until almost a year later, in a friendly match against Ukraine on 21 March 2002.

Although Nakamura played in four friendly matches leading up to the 2002 World Cup Finals, he was left out of the 23-man squad to the disappointment of fans. In the second to last warm up match for the World Cup against Honduras, he scored two goals, one of them a curling shot made directly from a corner kick. However, he picked up a knee injury against Honduras and did not play in the final warm up match, a 3–0 loss against Norway, and was ultimately not picked for the World Cup squad.

Despite Nakamura's talents, Troussier could not find a place for him in his rigid, defensive-minded system. He believed Nakamura lacked the physique and stamina to play either the center or the left of the midfield, and had a surplus of players at both positions.

=== Under Zico ===
After the World Cup, Troussier resigned as manager of Japan, and was replaced by former Brazil and Kashima Antlers star Zico. The new coach immediately brought the talented player back to the national team, starting Nakamura in his debut against Jamaica.

Zico has lauded Nakamura's improvement since 2002, especially his physical development, stating, "Unquestionably, he has improved a great deal since his move to Serie A. He is the soul of our midfield." Nakamura has flourished under Zico's attacking style and earned his place as the central playmaker. He led Japan to the championship at Asian Cup 2004, where he was named Most Valuable Player, and qualification for the 2006 World Cup Finals. Nakamura also starred for Japan in the 2003 and 2005 Confederations Cup, scoring a total of 4 goals in 5 matches.

Nakamura was suspended for the World Cup qualification match against North Korea on 8 June 2005 that clinched Japan's place in the 2006 Finals, he nonetheless played a key role in the qualifying run and had replaced Hidetoshi Nakata as the main playmaker in Japan's attack during that period.

In the 2006 FIFA World Cup Nakamura scored the controversial opening goal in Japan's first game against Australia, which Australia came back to win 3–1.

After the 2010 World Cup, Nakamura retired from international football.

== Style of play ==
A versatile playmaker, with good feet, Nakamura was capable of playing in several midfield positions, including in the centre of the pitch or out wide, although he normally played as an attacking midfielder behind the forwards. A left-footed player, Nakamura was renowned for his creativity and long range passing ability, as well as his accuracy from free kicks, making a name for himself as a set-piece specialist.

== Managerial career ==
On 18 January 2023, it was announced that Nakamura would become the first team coach of Yokohama FC ahead of the 2023 season.

On 16 April 2026, Nakamura was announced as an assistant coach at the Japan national football team.

== Personal life ==
Nakamura married a former Japanese celebrity in 2004. That same year, his first son was born. His second son was born on 15 January 2008 in Glasgow, Scotland. According to the Evening Times, he is a fan of the Grand Theft Auto and Gran Turismo video game series. He has appeared on the front cover (some of them with Zico) of the Japanese releases of Konami's Winning Eleven video game series (WE 5, WE 9, WE 9: Ubiquitous Evolution and WE 10) in 2001, 2005 and 2006. He also appeared on the front cover of Namco's Football Kingdom Trial Edition in 2004. He is the paid promoter of the Yamada electronics chain. His current boot sponsor is Adidas. Nakamura has illustrated the precision of his free kicks with novelty performances on television, including knocking ornaments off the top of a wedding cake without affecting the cake itself and striking a ball through the window of a moving bus.

== Career statistics ==
=== Club ===
As of the end 2022 season

Appearances and goals by club, season and competition
Club	Season	League			National cup (Note: Includes Emperor's Cup, Coppa Italia, Scottish Cup, Copa del Rey)		League cup (Note: Includes J.League Cup, Scottish League Cup)		Continental		Other		Total	
Club	Season	Division	Apps	Goals	Apps	Goals	Apps	Goals	Apps	Goals	Apps	Goals	Apps	Goals
Yokohama F. Marinos	1997	J1 League	27	5	1	0	3	0	—		—		31	5
Yokohama F. Marinos	1998	J1 League	33	9	0	0	4	1	—		—		37	10
Yokohama F. Marinos	1999	J1 League	26	7	3	1	4	0	—		—		33	8
Yokohama F. Marinos	2000	J1 League	30	5	2	0	4	1	—		2 (Note: Appearances in J.League Championship)	0	38	6
Yokohama F. Marinos	2001	J1 League	24	3	1	0	6	2	—		—		31	5
Yokohama F. Marinos	2002	J1 League	8	4	0	0	0	0	—		—		8	4
Yokohama F. Marinos	Total		148	33	7	1	21	4	—		2	0	178	38
Reggina	2002–03	Serie A	31	7	4	1	—		—		1 (Note: Appearance in Serie A relegation play-offs)	0	36	8
Reggina	2003–04	Serie A	16	2	2	0	—		—		—		18	2
Reggina	2004–05	Serie A	33	2	0	0	—		—		—		33	2
Reggina	Total		80	11	6	1	—		—		1	0	87	12
Celtic	2005–06	Scottish Premier League	33	6	1	0	4	0	—		—		38	6
Celtic	2006–07	Scottish Premier League	37	9	5	0	0	0	8 (Note: Appearances in UEFA Champions League)	2	—		50	11
Celtic	2007–08	Scottish Premier League	26	6	4	1	0	0	6	1	—		36	8
Celtic	2008–09	Scottish Premier League	32	8	2	0	3	1	5	0	—		42	9
Celtic	Total		128	29	12	1	7	1	19	3	—		166	34
Espanyol	2009–10	La Liga	13	0	2	0	—		—		—		15	0
Yokohama F. Marinos	2010	J1 League	32	5	2	1	1	0	—		—		35	6
Yokohama F. Marinos	2011	J1 League	24	4	5	2	2	0	—		—		31	6
Yokohama F. Marinos	2012	J1 League	31	6	5	2	3	0	—		—		39	8
Yokohama F. Marinos	2013	J1 League	33	10	5	1	10	2	—		—		48	13
Yokohama F. Marinos	2014	J1 League	32	3	0	0	1	0	5 (Note: Appearances in AFC Champions League)	0	1 (Note: Appearance in Japanese Super Cup)	0	39	3
Yokohama F. Marinos	2015	J1 League	19	3	2	0	1	0	—		—		22	3
Yokohama F. Marinos	2016	J1 League	19	4	3	1	1	1	—		—		23	6
Yokohama F. Marinos	Total		190	35	22	7	19	3	5	0	1	0	237	45
Júbilo Iwata	2017	J1 League	30	5	1	0	0	0	—		—		31	5
Júbilo Iwata	2018	J1 League	16	0	0	0	2	0	—		—		18	0
Júbilo Iwata	2019	J1 League	2	0	0	0	0	0	—		—		2	0
Júbilo Iwata	Total		48	5	1	0	2	0	—		—		51	5
Yokohama FC	2019	J2 League	10	1	1	0	—		—		—		11	1
Yokohama FC	2020	J1 League	10	0	0	0	—		—		—		10	0
Yokohama FC	2021	J1 League	12	0	1	0	1	0	—		—		14	0
Yokohama FC	2022	J2 League	6	0	0	0	—		—		—		6	0
Yokohama FC	Total		38	1	2	0	1	0	—		—		41	1
Career total			657	115	50	11	49	8	24	3	4	0	795	136

=== International ===
Appearances and goals by national team and year
National team	Year	Apps	Goals
Japan	1998	3	1
Japan	2000	16	3
Japan	2001	1	0
Japan	2002	6	2
Japan	2003	8	4
Japan	2004	15	3
Japan	2005	11	3
Japan	2006	6	1
Japan	2007	10	4
Japan	2008	9	2
Japan	2009	11	2
Japan	2010	5	0
Total		101	25

Scores and results list Japan's goal tally first, score column indicates score after each Nakamura goal.

List of international goals scored by Shunsuke Nakamura
No.	Date	Venue	Opponent	Score	Result	Competition	Ref.
1	9 December 1998	Rajamangala Stadium, Bangkok, Thailand	Kuwait	2–1	2–1	1998 Asian Games	
2	16 February 2000	Estádio Campo Desportivo, Taipa, Macau	Brunei	5–0	9–0	2000 AFC Asian Cup qualification	
3	11 June 2000	Miyagi Stadium, Rifu, Japan	Slovakia	1–1	1–1	Friendly	
4	16 August 2000	Hiroshima Park Stadium, Hiroshima, Japan	United Arab Emirates	2–0	3–1	Friendly	
5	2 May 2002	Kobe Universiade Memorial Stadium, Kobe, Japan	Honduras	1–1	3–3	Friendly	
6	2 May 2002	Kobe Universiade Memorial Stadium, Kobe, Japan	Honduras	2–2	3–3	Friendly	
7	28 March 2003	Japan National Stadium, Tokyo, Japan	Uruguay	1–1	2–2	Friendly	
8	18 June 2003	Stade de France, Paris, France	New Zealand	1–0	3–0	2003 FIFA Confederations Cup	
9	18 June 2003	Stade de France, Paris, France	New Zealand	3–0	3–0	2003 FIFA Confederations Cup	
10	20 June 2003	Stade Geoffroy-Guichard, Saint-Étienne, France	France	1–1	1–2	2003 FIFA Confederations Cup	
11	9 June 2004	Saitama Stadium 2002, Saitama, Japan	India	3–0	7–0	2006 FIFA World Cup qualification	
12	20 July 2004	Chongqing Olympic Sports Center, Chongqing, China	Oman	1–0	1–0	2004 AFC Asian Cup	
13	24 July 2004	Chongqing Olympic Sports Center, Chongqing, China	Thailand	1–1	4–1	2004 AFC Asian Cup	
14	22 June 2005	RheinEnergieStadion, Cologne, Germany	Brazil	1–1	2–2	2005 FIFA Confederations Cup	
15	7 September 2005	Miyagi Stadium, Rifu, Japan	Honduras	3–4	5–4	Friendly	
16	8 October 2005	Skonto Stadium, Riga, Latvia	Latvia	2–0	2–2	Friendly	
17	12 June 2006	Fritz-Walter-Stadion, Kaiserslautern, Germany	Australia	1–0	1–3	2006 FIFA World Cup	
18	13 July 2007	Mỹ Đình National Stadium, Hanoi, Vietnam	United Arab Emirates	3–0	3–1	2007 AFC Asian Cup	
19	16 July 2007	Mỹ Đình National Stadium, Hanoi, Vietnam	Vietnam	3–1	4–1	2007 AFC Asian Cup	
20	11 September 2007	Wörthersee Stadion, Klagenfurt, Austria	Switzerland	1–2	4–3	Friendly	
21	11 September 2007	Wörthersee Stadion, Klagenfurt, Austria	Switzerland	3–2	4–3	Friendly	
22	2 June 2008	International Stadium Yokohama, Yokohama, Japan	Oman	3–0	3–0	2010 FIFA World Cup qualification	
23	6 September 2008	Bahrain National Stadium, Riffa, Bahrain	Bahrain	1–0	3–2	2010 FIFA World Cup qualification	
24	28 March 2009	Saitama Stadium 2002, Saitama, Japan	Bahrain	1–0	1–0	2010 FIFA World Cup qualification	
25	18 November 2009	Hong Kong Stadium, Causeway Bay, Hong Kong	Hong Kong	3–0	4–0	2011 AFC Asian Cup qualification	

== Honours ==
Yokohama F. Marinos

- J.League Cup: 2001
- Emperor's Cup: 2013

Celtic

- Scottish Premier League: 2005–06, 2006–07, 2007–08
- Scottish Cup: 2006–07
- Scottish League Cup: 2005–06, 2008–09

Yokohama

- J2 League promotion: 2022

Japan

- AFC Asian Cup: 2000, 2004

Individual

- FIFA Confederations Cup Bronze Shoe: 2003
- J.League Player of the Year: 2000, 2013
- J.League Best Eleven: 1999, 2000, 2013
- J.League 20th Anniversary Team
- J.League 30th Anniversary Team
- J.League Monthly MVP: March 2013, October 2015
- Japanese Footballer of the Year: 2000, 2013
- AFC Asian Cup MVP: 2004
- AFC Asian Cup Best Eleven: 2000, 2004, 2007
- AFC Asian Cup All-time XI: 2023
- SPFA Players' Player of the Year: 2006–07
- SFWA Footballer of the Year: 2006–07
- SPL Player of the Year: 2006–07
- Celtic Player of the Year: 2006–07
- SPFA Team of the Season: 2006–07
- SPFA Goal of the Season: 2006–07

== Bibliography ==
- Greig, Martin (2008). The Zen of Naka. Mainstream Publishing Company (Edinburgh) Ltd. ISBN 9781845963576.
- Strachan, Gordon (2006). Strachan: My Life in Football. London: Time Warner Books. ISBN 9780751537482.
- Parrish, Charles; Nauright, John (2014). Soccer around the World: A Cultural Guide to the World's Favorite Sport. Santa Barbara: ABC-CLIO. ISBN 9781610693028.
