= 2006–07 Scottish Premier League =

101st season of top-tier football league in Scotland

Scottish Premier League
- Season: 2006–07
- Dates: 29 July 2006 – 20 May 2007
- Champions: Celtic; 5th Premier League title 41st Scottish title
- Relegated: Dunfermline
- Champions League: Celtic; Rangers
- UEFA Cup: Aberdeen; Dunfermline
- Intertoto Cup: None
- Matches: 228
- Goals: 560 (2.46 per match)
- Top goalscorer: Kris Boyd (20)
- Biggest home win: Motherwell 5–0 Kilmarnock (30 September)
- Biggest away win: Motherwell 1–6 Hibernian (18 November)

The 2006–07 Scottish Premier League season was the ninth season of the Scottish Premier League. It began on 29 July 2006.

The league champions, Celtic and runners-up, Rangers, qualified for the UEFA Champions League on the return of Walter Smith as manager following a brief and disastrous reign by Frenchman Paul Le Guen. The team finishing third, Aberdeen qualified for the UEFA Cup, as did the Scottish Cup finalists Dunfermline Athletic. However, being the bottom-placed team in the SPL, Dunfermline were also relegated to the First Division.

== Teams ==
=== Promotion and relegation from 2005–06 ===
Promoted from First Division to Premier League

- St Mirren

Relegated from Premier League to First Division

- Livingston

=== Stadia and locations ===
Aberdeen	Celtic	Dundee United	Dunfermline Athletic
Pittodrie Stadium	Celtic Park	Tannadice Park	East End Park
Capacity: 20,866	Capacity: 60,411	Capacity: 14,223	Capacity: 12,509
Falkirk	Location of teams in 2006–07 Scottish Premier League		Heart of Midlothian
Falkirk Stadium	Location of teams in 2006–07 Scottish Premier League		Tynecastle Park
Capacity: 7,937	Location of teams in 2006–07 Scottish Premier League		Capacity: 17,420
Hibernian	Location of teams in 2006–07 Scottish Premier League		Inverness Caledonian Thistle
Easter Road	Location of teams in 2006–07 Scottish Premier League		Caledonian Stadium
Capacity: 16,531	Location of teams in 2006–07 Scottish Premier League		Capacity: 7,500
Kilmarnock	Motherwell	Rangers	St Mirren
Rugby Park	Fir Park	Ibrox Stadium	Love Street
Capacity: 17,889	Capacity: 13,677	Capacity: 50,817	Capacity: 10,800

=== Personnel ===
Team	Manager
Aberdeen	(Scotland) Jimmy Calderwood
Celtic	(Scotland) Gordon Strachan
Dundee United	(Scotland) Craig Levein
Dunfermline Athletic	(Republic of Ireland) Stephen Kenny
Falkirk	(Scotland) John Hughes
Heart of Midlothian	(Russia) Anatoliy Korobochka
Hibernian	(Scotland) John Collins
Inverness Caledonian Thistle	(Scotland) Charlie Christie
Kilmarnock	(Scotland) Jim Jefferies
Motherwell	(Scotland) Maurice Malpas
Rangers	(Scotland) Walter Smith
St Mirren	(Scotland) Gus MacPherson

==== Managerial changes ====
Team	Outgoing manager	Date of vacancy	Manner of departure	Position in table	Incoming manager	Date of appointment
Rangers	(Scotland) Alex McLeish	8 May 2006	Sacked	Pre-season	(France) Paul Le Guen	9 May 2006
Motherwell	(England) Terry Butcher	17 May 2006	Signed by Sydney FC	Pre-season	(Scotland) Maurice Malpas	17 May 2006
Hibernian	(England) Tony Mowbray	13 October 2006	Signed by West Bromwich Albion	7th	(Scotland) John Collins	31 October 2006
Dunfermline Athletic	(Scotland) Jim Leishman	26 October 2006	Became Director of Football	11th	(Republic of Ireland) Stephen Kenny	10 November 2006
Dundee United	(Scotland) Craig Brewster	29 October 2006	Sacked	12th	(Scotland) Craig Levein	30 October 2006
Rangers	(France) Paul Le Guen	4 January 2007	Mutual consent	2nd	(Scotland) Walter Smith	10 January 2007
Heart of Midlothian	(Lithuania) Valdas Ivanauskas	20 March 2007	Mutual consent	4th	(Russia) Anatoliy Korobochka	20 March 2007 (caretaker); 30 July 2007 (permanent)

== Events ==
- On 22 April 2007 Celtic beat Kilmarnock 2–1 to win the title for the second season running thanks to goals from Jan Vennegoor of Hesselink and Shunsuke Nakamura who scored a free-kick in the dying second of the match to clinch the title for Celtic
- On 12 May 2007 Dunfermline Athletic were relegated to the First Division after a 2–1 defeat at Inverness CT and St Mirren came back from 2–0 down to win 3–2 at Motherwell.
- On 20 May 2007 Aberdeen beat Rangers 2–0 at home in their final game of the season to qualify for the UEFA Cup.
- For the second consecutive season, the top scorer was Kris Boyd of Rangers, with 20 goals.

== League table ==
Pos	Team	Pld	W	D	L	GF	GA	GD	Pts	Qualification or relegation (Note: Teams played each other three times (33 matches), before the league split into two groups (the top six and the bottom six) for the last five matches.)
1	Celtic (C)	38	26	6	6	65	34	+31	84	Qualification for the Champions League third qualifying round
2	Rangers	38	21	9	8	61	32	+29	72	Qualification for the Champions League second qualifying round
3	Aberdeen	38	19	8	11	55	38	+17	65	Qualification for the UEFA Cup first round
4	Heart of Midlothian	38	17	10	11	47	35	+12	61	
5	Kilmarnock	38	16	7	15	47	54	−7	55	
6	Hibernian	38	13	10	15	56	46	+10	49	
7	Falkirk	38	15	5	18	49	47	+2	50	
8	Inverness Caledonian Thistle	38	11	13	14	42	48	−6	46	
9	Dundee United	38	10	12	16	40	59	−19	42	
10	Motherwell	38	10	8	20	41	61	−20	38	
11	St Mirren	38	8	12	18	31	51	−20	36	
12	Dunfermline Athletic (R)	38	8	8	22	26	55	−29	32	Relegation to the Scottish First Division and qualification for UEFA Cup second qualifying round (Note: As Celtic, the Scottish Cup winners, qualified for the Champions League via their league position, the place in the UEFA Cup was passed to Dunfermline Athletic, the cup runner-up.)

Source: Scottish Professional Football League
Rules for classification: 1) Points; 2) Goal difference; 3) Goals scored
(C) Champions; (R) Relegated

== Results ==
=== Matches 1–22 ===
During matches 1–22 each team played every other team twice (home and away).

Home \ Away	ABE	CEL	DUN	DNF	FAL	HOM	HIB	INV	KIL	MOT	RAN	STM
Aberdeen		0–1	3–1	1–0	2–1	1–3	2–1	1–1	3–1	2–1	1–2	2–0
Celtic	1–0		2–2	1–0	1–0	2–1	2–1	3–0	4–1	2–1	2–0	2–0
Dundee United	3–1	1–4		0–0	1–2	0–1	0–3	3–1	1–0	1–1	2–1	1–0
Dunfermline Athletic	0–3	1–2	2–1		0–3	1–2	0–4	0–0	3–2	0–2	1–1	2–1
Falkirk	0–2	0–1	5–1	1–0		1–1	2–1	3–1	1–2	0–1	1–0	1–1
Heart of Midlothian	0–1	2–1	4–0	1–1	0–0		3–1	4–1	0–2	4–1	0–1	0–1
Hibernian	1–1	2–2	2–1	2–0	0–1	2–2		2–0	2–2	3–1	2–1	5–1
Inverness Caledonian Thistle	1–1	1–1	0–0	1–0	3–2	0–0	0–0		3–4	0–1	2–1	1–2
Kilmarnock	1–0	1–2	0–0	5–1	2–1	0–0	2–1	1–1		1–2	2–2	1–1
Motherwell	0–2	1–1	2–3	2–1	4–2	0–1	1–6	1–4	5–0		1–2	0–0
Rangers	1–0	1–1	2–2	2–0	4–0	2–0	3–0	0–1	3–0	1–1		1–1
St Mirren	1–1	1–3	1–3	0–0	1–0	2–2	1–0	1–1	0–1	2–0	2–3	

Legend: Blue = home team win; Yellow = draw; Red = away team win.

=== Matches 23–33 ===
During matches 23–33 each team played every other team once (either at home or away).

Home \ Away	ABE	CEL	DUN	DNF	FAL	HOM	HIB	INV	KIL	MOT	RAN	STM
Aberdeen		1–2	2–4	3–0		1–0		1–1				
Celtic				2–1			2–1		4–0	2–0	0–1	3–1
Dundee United		0–3		0–0	1–5		0–0			1–1		
Dunfermline Athletic						0–1	1–0		1–1		0–1	0–0
Falkirk	1–2	1–0		1–0					0–2	1–2		2–1
Heart of Midlothian		1–4	0–4		1–0			1–0	1–0			1–1
Hibernian	0–0				2–0	0–1				2–0	0–2	
Inverness Caledonian Thistle		1–2	1–0	1–3	1–1		3–0					2–1
Kilmarnock	1–2		1–0				0–2	3–2			1–3	
Motherwell	0–2			2–0		0–2		1–0	0–1		0–1	
Rangers	3–0		5–0		2–1	0–0		1–1				
St Mirren	0–2		0–1				1–1		0–2	0–0	0–1	

Legend: Blue = home team win; Yellow = draw; Red = away team win.

=== Matches 34–38 ===
During matches 34–38 each team played every other team in their half of the table once.

==== Top six ====
Home \ Away	ABE	CEL	HOM	HIB	KIL	RAN
Aberdeen				2–2	3–0	2–0
Celtic	2–1		1–3			
Heart of Midlothian	1–1			2–0		
Hibernian		2–1			0–1	3–3
Kilmarnock		1–3	1–0			
Rangers		2–0	2–1		0–1	

Legend: Blue = home team win; Yellow = draw; Red = away team win.

==== Bottom six ====
Home \ Away	DUN	DNF	FAL	INV	MOT	STM
Dundee United				1–1	0–0	0–2
Dunfermline Athletic	1–0		0–3		4–1	
Falkirk	2–0			1–0		0–2
Inverness Caledonian Thistle		2–1			2–0	
Motherwell			3–3			2–3
St Mirren		0–1		0–1		

Legend: Blue = home team win; Yellow = draw; Red = away team win.

== Goals ==
=== Top scorers ===
Scorer	Team	Appearances	Goals	Average
(Scotland) Kris Boyd	Rangers	32	20	0.63
(Australia) Scott McDonald	Motherwell	32	15	0.47
(Scotland) Steven Naismith	Kilmarnock	37	15	0.41
(Republic of Ireland) Anthony Stokes	Falkirk	16	14	0.86
(New Zealand) Chris Killen	Hibernian	18	13	0.72
(Scotland) Darren Mackie	Aberdeen	36	13	0.36
(Netherlands) Jan Vennegoor of Hesselink	Celtic	21	13	0.62
(Scotland) Colin Nish	Kilmarnock	33	12	0.36
(Scotland) Charlie Adam	Rangers	32	11	0.34
(Scotland) Barry Robson	Dundee United	29	11	0.38
(England) John Sutton	St Mirren	33	11	0.33
(Scotland) Craig Dargo	Inverness CT	27	10	0.37
(Republic of Ireland) Noel Hunt	Dundee United	28	10	0.36
(England) Steve Lovell	Aberdeen	27	9	0.33
(Japan) Shunsuke Nakamura	Celtic	37	9	0.24
(Lithuania) Andrius Velicka	Heart of Midlothian	27	8	0.30

=== Hat-tricks ===
Scorer	For	Against	Date
(Japan) Shunsuke Nakamura	Celtic	Dundee United	14 October 2006
(Republic of Ireland) Anthony Stokes	Falkirk	Dundee United	28 October 2006
(Republic of Ireland) Anthony Stokes	Falkirk	Dunfermline Athletic	4 November 2006
(Denmark) Thomas Gravesen	Celtic	St Mirren	12 November 2006
(Republic of Ireland) Anthony Stokes	Falkirk	Inverness CT	30 December 2006
(Netherlands) Jan Vennegoor of Hesselink	Celtic	St Mirren	20 January 2007
(Scotland) Kris Boyd	Rangers	Kilmarnock	11 February 2007
(Scotland) Kris Boyd	Rangers	Aberdeen	17 March 2007
(Scotland) Barry Robson	Dundee United	Heart of Midlothian	17 March 2007

== Attendances ==
Overall 3.7 million spectators attended an average per match of just over 8,090. The average and highest attendances for SPL clubs during the 2006/07 season are shown below:

Club	Average	Highest
Celtic	57,928	59,659
Rangers	49,955	50,488
Hearts	16,937	17,369
Hibernian	14,587	16,747
Aberdeen	12,475	20,045
Dundee United	7,147	12,329
Kilmarnock	6,807	13,506
Dunfermline Athletic	6,106	8,561
Motherwell	5,877	11,745
St Mirren	5,609	10,251
Falkirk	5,387	7,245
Inverness CT	4,879	7,522

Source: SPL official website

== Awards ==
=== Monthly awards ===
Month	Manager	Player	Young Player
August	(Scotland) Jim Jefferies (Kilmarnock)	(Trinidad and Tobago) Russell Latapy (Falkirk)	(Republic of Ireland) Aiden McGeady (Celtic)
September	(Scotland) Gordon Strachan (Celtic)	(Scotland) Allan McGregor (Rangers)	(Republic of Ireland) Aiden McGeady (Celtic)
October	(Scotland) Charlie Christie (Inverness CT)	(England) Lee Naylor (Celtic)	(Republic of Ireland) Anthony Stokes (Falkirk)
November	(Scotland) Craig Levein (Dundee United)	(Scotland) Russell Anderson (Aberdeen)	(Republic of Ireland) Anthony Stokes (Falkirk)
December	(Scotland) John Hughes (Falkirk)	(Poland) Artur Boruc (Celtic)	(Scotland) Darren Barr (Falkirk)
January	(Scotland) Gordon Strachan (Celtic)	(Netherlands) Jan Vennegoor of Hesselink (Celtic)	(Scotland) Christophe Berra (Hearts)
February	(Scotland) Maurice Malpas (Motherwell)	(Japan) Shunsuke Nakamura (Celtic)	(Scotland) Lewis Stevenson (Hibernian)
March	(Scotland) Craig Levein (Dundee United)	(Scotland) Alan Hutton (Rangers)	(Scotland) Steven Naismith (Kilmarnock)
April	(Republic of Ireland) Stephen Kenny (Dunfermline Athletic)	(Northern Ireland) Neil Lennon (Celtic)	(Scotland) Mark Reynolds (Motherwell)

=== Annual awards ===
Award	Winner	Club
PFA Players' Player of the Year	(Japan) Shunsuke Nakamura	Celtic
PFA Young Player of the Year	(Scotland) Steven Naismith	Kilmarnock
SFWA Footballer of the Year	(Japan) Shunsuke Nakamura	Celtic
SFWA Young Player of the Year	(Scotland) Scott Brown	Hibernian
PFA Manager of the Year	(Scotland) Gordon Strachan	Celtic
SFWA Manager of the Year	(Scotland) Gordon Strachan	Celtic

PFA Scotland Team of the Year
Goalkeeper	(Poland) Artur Boruc (Celtic)			
Defenders	(Scotland) Steven Whittaker (Hibernian)	(Scotland) Russell Anderson (Aberdeen)	(Scotland) Stephen McManus (Celtic)	(England) Lee Naylor (Celtic)
Midfielders	(Scotland) Scott Brown (Hibernian)		(Scotland) Barry Ferguson (Rangers)	(Japan) Shunsuke Nakamura (Celtic)
Forwards	(Scotland) Steven Naismith (Kilmarnock)		(Scotland) Kris Boyd (Rangers)	(Australia) Scott McDonald (Motherwell)

== See also ==
- 2006–07 Celtic F.C. season
- 2006–07 Dundee United F.C. season
- 2006–07 Hibernian F.C. season
- 2006–07 Kilmarnock F.C. season
- 2006–07 Rangers F.C. season
