= 2012 Yokohama F. Marinos season =

Yokohama F. Marinos
2012 season
- Chairman: Akira Kaetsu
- Manager: Yasuhiro Higuchi
- J.League Division 1: 4th
- Emperor's Cup: Semi-final
- J.League Cup: Group stage
Home colours	Away colours

The 2012 Yokohama F. Marinos season was Yokohama F. Marinos's 20th season in J.League Division 1 and 33rd season overall in the top flight (counting the Japan Soccer League and participation in the inaugural J.League Cup). It also includes the 2012 J.League Cup and 2012 Emperor's Cup.

== Competitions ==
=== J.League ===
==== League table ====
Pos	Team	Pld	W	D	L	GF	GA	GD	Pts	Qualification or relegation
2	Vegalta Sendai	34	15	12	7	59	43	+16	57	Qualification to 2013 Champions League (Note: The winners of the 2012 Emperor's Cup qualified for the group stage of the 2013 AFC Champions League.)
3	Urawa Red Diamonds	34	15	10	9	47	42	+5	55	Qualification to 2013 Champions League
4	Yokohama F. Marinos	34	13	14	7	44	33	+11	53	
5	Sagan Tosu	34	15	8	11	48	39	+9	53	
6	Kashiwa Reysol	34	15	7	12	57	52	+5	52	Qualification to 2013 Champions League

Updated to match(es) played on 1 December 2012. Source: J.League Division 1
Rules for classification: 1) points; 2) goal difference; 3) number of goals scored.

==== Matches ====
11 March 2012 1	Kashiwa Reysol	3–3	Yokohama F. Marinos	Kashiwa Hitachi Stadium
Sunday 14:04	Sakai 3'; Tanaka 12'; Domingues 64'	Report	7' Oguro; 60' Saitō; 90+1' Taniguchi	Attendance: 13,082; Referee: Murakami

17 March 2012 2	Yokohama F. Marinos	0–2	Vegalta Sendai	Nissan Stadium
Saturday 14:03		Report	43' Akamine; 90+8' Ota	Attendance: 19,488; Referee: Imamura

24 March 2012 3	Sagan Tosu	1–0	Yokohama F. Marinos	Best Amenity Stadium
Saturday 15:04	Mizunuma 77'	Report		Attendance: 10,611; Referee: Maeda

31 March 2012 4	Yokohama F. Marinos	0–0	Kashima Antlers	Nissan Stadium
Saturday 19:03		Report		Attendance: 22,126; Referee: Iida

7 April 2012 5	Albirex Niigata	0–0	Yokohama F. Marinos	Tohoku Electric Power Big Swan Stadium
16:00 JST		Report	Yuzo Kobayashi (yellow card) 62'	Attendance: 15,854; Referee: (Japan) Ryuji Sato

14 April 2012 6	Yokohama F. Marinos	1–1	Omiya Ardija	Nissan Stadium
15:00 JST	Ono 53'; Nakamura (yellow card) 78'; Dutra (yellow card) 81'	Report	Carlinhos Paraíba (yellow card) 44'; Hasegawa 82'	Attendance: 7,101; Referee: (Japan) Masaaki Iemoto

21 April 2012 7	Júbilo Iwata	1–0	Yokohama F. Marinos	Yamaha Stadium
15:00 JST	Yamada 35'	Report		Attendance: 11,965; Referee: (Japan) Itaru Hirose

28 April 2012 8	Yokohama F. Marinos	3–1	Vissel Kobe	Nissan Stadium
17:00 JST	Tomisawa (yellow card) 41' (yellow-red card) 90+1'; Ono 71'; Taniguchi 73'; Nakazawa 76'	Report	Tashiro (yellow card) 24'; Oya 57'	Attendance: 21,054; Referee: (Japan) Hajime Matsuo

3 May 2012 9	Urawa Red Diamonds	1–2	Yokohama F. Marinos	Saitama Stadium 2002
20:00 JST	Kojima (yellow card) 58'; Makino 78'	Report	Saitō 12'; Andrew Kumagai (yellow card) 17'; Nakazawa (yellow card) 67'; Ono (yellow card) 73'; Hyodo (yellow card) 76'; Marquinhos 88'	Attendance: 44,422; Referee: (Japan) Toshimitsu Yoshida

6 May 2012 10	Yokohama F. Marinos	2–1	Consadole Sapporo	Nissan Stadium
14:00 JST	Nakamura 22'; Taniguchi 78'	Report	Lee Ho-Seung (yellow card) 22'; Furuta 26'; Kushibiki (yellow card) 85'	Attendance: 24,183; Referee: (Japan) Yoshiro Imamura

12 May 2012 11	Sanfrecce Hiroshima	1–3	Yokohama F. Marinos	Hiroshima Big Arch
16:00 JST	Aoyama 6'	Report	Marquinhos 39'; Ono (yellow card) 43'; Saitō (yellow card) 67' (goal) 79'; Tomisawa 83'	Attendance: 12,073; Referee: (Japan) Hiroyuki Kimura

19 May 2012 12	Yokohama F. Marinos	0–0	Gamba Osaka	Nissan Stadium
15:00 JST	Ono (yellow card) 89'	Report	Paulinho (yellow card) 45+2'; Niwa (yellow card) 60'	Attendance: 25,241; Referee: (Japan) Jumpei Lida

26 May 2012 13	Shimizu S-Pulse	0–0	Yokohama F. Marinos	Outsourcing Stadium Nihondaira
15:00 JST	Kang Song-Ho (yellow card) 31'	Report	Dutra (yellow card) 28'	Attendance: 16,556; Referee: (Japan) Nobutsugu Murakami

16 June 2012 14	Yokohama F. Marinos	1–0	FC Tokyo	Nissan Stadium
20:00 JST	Hyodo 32'; Nakamura (yellow card) 39'; Saitō (yellow card) 77'	Report		Attendance: 23,273; Referee: (Japan) Masaaki Iemoto

23 June 2012 15	Kawasaki Frontale	0–0	Yokohama F. Marinos	Todoroki Athletics Stadium
20:00 JST	Tanaka (yellow card) 82'; Kurotsu (yellow card) 86'	Report	Ono (yellow card) 64'; Taniguchi (yellow card) 65'	Attendance: 20,590; Referee: (Japan) Kenji Ogiya

30 June 2012 16	Yokohama F. Marinos	1–1	Nagoya Grampus	Nissan Stadium
19:00 JST	Tomisawa (yellow card) 44'; Marquinhos 53'	Report	Nagai 83'; Tanaka (yellow card) 87'	Attendance: 26,133; Referee: (Japan) Kazuhiko Matsumura

7 July 2012 17	Yokohama F. Marinos	1–1	Cerezo Osaka	Nissan Stadium
20:00 JST	Tomisawa 31'; Kobayashi (yellow card) 87'	Report	Ogihara (yellow card) 28'; Kakitani 80'; Sakemoto (yellow card) 89'	Attendance: 9,751; Referee: (Japan) Tomohiro Inoue

14 July 2012 18	Gamba Osaka	1–2	Yokohama F. Marinos	Osaka Expo '70 Stadium
20:00 JST	Endō (yellow card) 56'; Niwa (yellow card) 74'; Paulinho 88'	Report	Kurihara (yellow card) 22'; Tomisawa 44'; Nakazawa (yellow card) 47'; Nakamura (yellow card) 60'; Saitō 90+4'	Attendance: 14,966; Referee: (Japan) Hiroyuki Kimura

28 July 2012 19	Yokohama F. Marinos	3–0	Shimizu S-Pulse	Nissan Stadium
20:00 JST	Nakamachi (yellow card) 6'; Kurihara (yellow card) 34'; Tomisawa (yellow card) 44'; Marquinhos 66' (yellow card) 66'; Oguro 75' (yellow card) 76'; Hyodo 85' (pen.)	Report	Kawai (yellow card) 28'	Attendance: 24,187; Referee: (England) Kevin Friend

4 August 2012 20	Vegalta Sendai	2–2	Yokohama F. Marinos	Yurtec Stadium Sendai
19:30 JST	Uchiyama (yellow card) 7' (goal) 60'; Kamata (yellow card) 30'; Wilson 87' (pen.)	Report	Nakamura 66'; Kanai 71'; Ono (yellow card) 74'; Tomisawa (yellow card) 82'; Kurihara (yellow card) 86'	Attendance: 17,935; Referee: (Japan) Hajime Matsuo

11 August 2012 21	Yokohama F. Marinos	3–2	Albirex Niigata	Nissan Stadium
20:00 JST	Nakazawa 62', 87'; Marquinhos 69'; Taniguchi (yellow card) 85'	Report	Tanaka 18', 65'; Michael (yellow card) 73'	Attendance: 11,992; Referee: (Japan) Koichiro Fukushima

18 August 2012 22	Yokohama F. Marinos	2–2	Kawasaki Frontale	Nissan Stadium
20:00 JST	Marquinhos 11', 34'	Summary	Saneto (yellow card) 16'; Tanaka 62', 85' (yellow card) 88'; Koki Kazama (yellow card) 90'	Attendance: 33,584; Referee: (Japan) Toshimitsu Yoshida

25 August 2012 23	Cerezo Osaka	2–0	Yokohama F. Marinos	Kincho Stadium
20:00 JST	Yamaguchi (yellow card) 62' (goal) 65'; Maruhashi (yellow card) 75'; Kakitani 77'	Summary	Dutra (yellow card) 8'	Attendance: 14,336; Referee: (Japan) Minoru Tojo

1 September 2012 24	FC Tokyo	3–1	Yokohama F. Marinos	Ajinomoto Stadium
19:30 JST	Tanabe 36'; Lucas Severino 42', 71'; Hasegawa (yellow card) 90+2'	Summary	Nakazawa (yellow card) 14'; Nakamachi (yellow card) 27'; Hyodo 66' (yellow card) 70'	Attendance: 26,950; Referee: (Japan) Nobutsugu Murakami

15 September 2012 25	Yokohama F. Marinos	1–2	Urawa Red Diamonds	Nissan Stadium
Saturday 20:00	Marquinhos 5'	Summary	Kashiwagi 23'; Makino 64'	Attendance: 34,954; Referee: (Japan) Yuichi Nishimura

22 September 2012 26	Kashima Antlers	1–2	Yokohama F. Marinos	Kashima Soccer Stadium
Saturday 15:00	Renato Cajá (yellow card) 45+3'; Juninho 90+4'	Summary	Andrew Kumagai 11' (yellow card) 72'; Marquinhos (red card) 45+3'; Nakamura 55' (yellow card) 83'	Attendance: 16,845; Referee: (Japan) Itaru Hirose

29 September 2012 27	Omiya Ardija	0–0	Yokohama F. Marinos	NACK5 Stadium Omiya
Saturday 17:00	Ljubijankič (yellow card) 45' (yellow-red card) 63'	Summary	Kurihara (yellow card) 38'; Tomisawa (yellow card) 90+2'	Attendance: 11,316; Referee: (Japan) Koichiro Fukushima

6 October 2012 28	Yokohama F. Marinos	0–0	Sanfrecce Hiroshima	Nissan Stadium
Saturday 15:00	Kobayashi (yellow card) 39'	Summary	Mikić (yellow card) 75'	Attendance: 36,412; Referee: (Japan) Ryuji Sato

20 October 2012 29	Yokohama F. Marinos	4–0	Júbilo Iwata	Nissan Stadium
Saturday 15:00	Marquinhos 14'; Hyodo 35'; Nakamura 71'; Nakamachi 84'	Summary	Yamazaki (yellow card) 59'	Attendance: 21,310; Referee: (Japan) Hiroyuki Kimura

27 October 2012 30	Nagoya Grampus	1–1	Yokohama F. Marinos	Mizuho Athletic Stadium
Saturday 15:00	Daniel (yellow card) 27'; Tamada 87'; Ogawa (yellow card) 90+1'; Taguchi (yellow card) 90+3'	Summary	Saitō (yellow card) 60'; Nakamura 90+5'	Attendance: 22,332; Referee: (Japan) Minoru Tojo

7 November 2012 31	Vissel Kobe	1–2	Yokohama F. Marinos	Home's Stadium Kobe
Wednesday 19:00	Ogawa (yellow card) 42'; Tokura 89'	Summary	Tomisawa (yellow card) 37' (yellow-red card) (goal) 45'; Hyodo (yellow card) 50'; Marquinhos 66'	Attendance: 8,775; Referee: (Japan) Takuto Okabe

17 November 2012 32	Yokohama F. Marinos	1–2	Kashiwa Reysol	Nissan Stadium
Saturday 14:00	Kondo 13' (o.g.); Kumagai (yellow card) 56'; Marquinhos (yellow card) 84'	Summary	Jorge Wagner 13'; Kurisawa (yellow card) 16'; Leandro Domingues 48'	Attendance: 22,647; Referee: (Japan) Futoshi Nakamura

24 November 2012 33	Consadole Sapporo	0–2	Yokohama F. Marinos	Sapporo Dome
Saturday 17:30	Haga (yellow card) 52'	Summary	Saitō 33', 50'; Nakamachi (yellow card) 57'; Nakamura (yellow card) 68'	Attendance: 19,587; Referee: (Japan) Tomohiro Inoue

1 December 2012 34	Yokohama F. Marinos	1–0	Sagan Tosu	Nissan Stadium
Saturday 15:30	Nakamura 53'; Dutra (yellow card) 90+2'	Summary	Takahashi (yellow card) 29'; Kobayashi (yellow card) 38'	Attendance: 26,642; Referee: (Japan) Yoshiro Imamura

=== J.League Cup ===
Team	Pld	W	D	L	GF	GA	GD	Pts
Shimizu S-Pulse	6	5	0	1	12	4	+8	15
Kashima Antlers	6	5	0	1	10	5	+5	15
Albirex Niigata	6	3	1	2	6	5	+1	10
Yokohama F. Marinos	6	1	2	3	7	9	−2	5
Omiya Ardija	6	1	2	3	7	10	−3	5
Consadole Sapporo	6	1	2	3	6	11	−5	5
Vissel Kobe	6	1	1	4	6	10	−4	4

20 March 2012 Group B	Omiya Ardija	1–1	Yokohama F. Marinos	NACK5 Stadium Omiya
Tuesday 16:00	Carlinhos 15'	Report	84' Saitō	Attendance: 7,845; Referee: Yoshida

4 April 2012 Group B	Yokohama F. Marinos	1–2	Consadole Sapporo	NHK Spring Mitsuzawa Football Stadium
Wednesday 19:33	Matsumoto 68'	Report	6' Oshima; 45+2' Sakaki	Attendance: 7,148; Referee: Fukushima

18 April 2012 Group B	Shimizu S-Pulse	1–0	Yokohama F. Marinos	Outsourcing Stadium Nihondaira
20:00	Kawai (yellow card) 42'; Kang Song-Ho (yellow card) 69'; Brosque 76'	Report	Andrew Kumagai (yellow card) 23'; Aoyama (yellow card) 36'; Nakamachi (yellow card) 90+2'	Attendance: 8,753; Referee: Hiroyuki Kimura

16 May 2012 Group B	Yokohama F. Marinos	3–2	Kashima Antlers	NHK Spring Mitsuzawa Football Stadium
20:30	Hyodo 38' (pen.); Saitō 84'; Oguro 86'	Report	Endo 58'; Juninho 69'	Attendance: 9,693; Referee: Masaaki Iemoto

9 June 2012 Group B	Yokohama F. Marinos	0–0	Albirex Niigata	NHK Spring Mitsuzawa Football Stadium
14:00	Nakazawa (yellow card) 69'	Report	Mikado (yellow card) 36'; Murakami (yellow card) 45+1'; Suzuki (yellow card) 85'	Attendance: 5,345; Referee: Yudai Yamamoto

27 June 2012 Group B	Vissel Kobe	3–2	Yokohama F. Marinos	Home's Stadium Kobe
20:00	Komoto 9', 87' (yellow card) 76'; Morioka 41'; Jun Kamita (yellow card) 90+2'	Report	Saitō (yellow card) 32'; Ono 37'; Kanai 80'	Attendance: 5,029; Referee: Antonio Arias

=== Emperor's Cup ===
8 September 2012 Round 2	Yokohama F. Marinos	4–2	Yokohama Sports and Culture Club	Yokohama
13:00	Ono 33'; Nakamachi 52'; Marquinhos 69'; Matsumoto 86'	Report	Akio Yoshida 66'; Masao Tsuji 90+3'	Stadium: Nippatsu Mitsuzawa Stadium; Attendance: 4,201; Referee: Takuto Okabe

10 October 2012 Round 3	Yokohama F. Marinos	2–1	Yokohama FC	Yokohama
19:00	Nakamura 25', 48'	Report	Watanabe 58'	Stadium: Nissan Stadium; Attendance: 8,862; Referee: Nobutsugu Murakami

15 December 2012 Round 4	Urawa Red Diamonds	0–2	Yokohama F. Marinos	Kumagaya, Saitama
16:00		Report	Hyodo 28'; Kano 49'	Stadium: Kumagaya Athletic Stadium; Attendance: 12,634; Referee: Ryuji Sato

23 December 2012 Quarterfinal	Nagoya Grampus	0–0 (a.e.t.) (6–7 p)	Yokohama F. Marinos	Mizuho Athletic Stadium, Nagoya
13:00		Report		Attendance: 10,043; Referee: Toma
	Penalties
	Fujimoto (penalty missed); Isomura (penalty scored); Taguchi (penalty scored); Tulio (penalty scored); Tamada (penalty scored); Nagai (penalty scored); Abe (penalty scored); H. Tanaka (penalty missed)		(penalty scored) Nakamura; (penalty scored) Hyodo; (penalty scored) Marquinhos; (penalty scored) Nakamachi; (penalty missed) Ono; (penalty scored) Kurihara; (penalty scored) Tomisawa; (penalty scored) Nakazawa

29 December 2012 Semi Final	Yokohama F. Marinos	0–1	Kashiwa Reysol	National Olympic Stadium, Shinjuku, Tokyo
15:00			Kudo 23'	Attendance: 21,267; Referee: Kenji Ogiya

== Kits ==
Home	Away	Special

Type	Shirt	Shorts	Socks	First appearance / Info
Home	Blue	White	Red	
Away	White	White	White	
Special	Blue	White	Red	J-League, Match 4, March 31 against Kashima Antlers
