= 2012 Albirex Niigata season =

Albirex Niigata
2012 season
- Chairman: Mitsugu Tamura
- Manager: Masaaki Yanagishita from June 12; Hisashi Kurosaki until May 21
- J.League Division 1: 15th
- Emperor's Cup: 3rd Round
- J.League Cup: Group Stage
- Top goalscorer: League: Bruno Lopes (7); All: Bruno Lopes (9)
- Highest home attendance: 35,506 (vs. Kashima Antlers, June 30)
- Lowest home attendance: 15,854 (vs. Yokohama F. Marinos, April 7)
- Average home league attendance: 25,018
Home colours	Away colours

The 2012 Albirex Niigata season was Albirex Niigata's 9th consecutive season in J.League Division 1. It also includes the 2012 J.League Cup, and the 2012 Emperor's Cup.

== Match results ==
=== Pre-season ===
8 February 2012	Albirex Niigata	1–1	Kōchi University	Haruno
14:00 JST	M.Suzuki 87'	Report	Goal	Stadium: Haruno Stadium

11 February 2012	Albirex Niigata	3–3	Kamatamare Sanuki	Haruno
13:30 JST	Kim Young-Geun (1–17); Alan Mineiro (2–18); Fujita (3–18)	Report	Ichihara; Morimoto	Stadium: Haruno Stadium

16 February 2012	Albirex Niigata	1–2	Tokyo Verdy	Haruno
13:30 JST	trainee (3–35)	Report	(1–35) Josimar (2–25) Koike	Stadium: Haruno Stadium

19 February 2012	Vissel Kobe	0–3	Albirex Niigata	Haruno
14:00 JST		Report	47' Michael; 68' Kim Jin-Su; 85' Bruno Lopes (pen)	Stadium: Haruno Stadium; Attendance: 4,198; Referee: Yuichi Nishimura

26 February 2012	Shimizu S-Pulse	0–0	Albirex Niigata	Shimizu
13:04 JST		Report		Stadium: Nihondaira Stadium; Attendance: 4,398; Referee: Tetsuro Yoshida

=== League table ===
Pos	Team	Pld	W	D	L	GF	GA	GD	Pts	Qualification or relegation
12	Júbilo Iwata	34	13	7	14	57	53	+4	46	
13	Omiya Ardija	34	11	11	12	38	45	−7	44	
14	Cerezo Osaka	34	11	9	14	47	53	−6	42	
15	Albirex Niigata	34	10	10	14	29	34	−5	40	
16	Vissel Kobe (R)	34	11	6	17	41	50	−9	39	Relegation to 2013 J.League Division 2
17	Gamba Osaka (R)	34	9	11	14	67	65	+2	38	Relegation to 2013 J.League Division 2
18	Consadole Sapporo (R)	34	4	2	28	25	88	−63	14	Relegation to 2013 J.League Division 2

Updated to match(es) played on 1 December 2012. Source: J.League Division 1
Rules for classification: 1) points; 2) goal difference; 3) number of goals scored.
(R) Relegated

==== Results summary ====
Overall								Home						Away					
Pld	W	D	L	GF	GA	GD	Pts	W	D	L	GF	GA	GD	W	D	L	GF	GA	GD
34	10	10	14	29	34	−5	40	3	6	8	15	21	−6	7	4	6	14	13	+1

Last updated: 1 December 2012.
Source: "J.League". Archived from the original on 2012-01-24.

==== Results by round ====
Round	1	2	3	4	5	6	7	8	9	10	11	12	13	14	15	16	17	18	19	20	21	22	23	24	25	26	27	28	29	30	31	32	33	34
Ground	A	H	A	H	H	A	A	H	A	H	A	H	A	H	A	H	A	H	A	H	A	H	A	H	A	A	H	H	A	H	A	H	A	H
Result	L	L	L	D	D	W	L	L	W	L	D	L	L	W	L	D	W	D	W	D	L	L	W	L	D	D	W	D	D	L	W	L	W	W
Position	14	17	17	16	15	13	17	17	17	17	17	17	17	16	17	17	16	16	14	15	17	17	16	16	17	17	17	16	17	17	17	17	17	15

Updated to match(es) played on 1 December 2012. Source: "J.League". Archived from the original on 2012-01-24.
A = Away; H = Home; W = Win; D = Draw; L = Loss

10 March 2012 1	Kawasaki Frontale	1–0	Albirex Niigata	Kawasaki
17:05 JST	Saneto 11'	Report		Stadium: Todoroki Stadium; Attendance: 18,920; Referee: Yudai Yamamoto

17 March 2012 2	Albirex Niigata	1–2	Omiya Ardija	Niigata
14:00 JST	Bruno Lopes 20'	Report	68' Kikuchi; 83' Rafael	Stadium: Big Swan; Attendance: 26,294; Referee: Kazuhiko Matsumura

25 March 2012 3	Nagoya Grampus	2–1	Albirex Niigata	Nagoya
16:03 JST	Kanazaki 49'; Kennedy 67'	Report	90+4' Bruno Lopes	Stadium: Mizuho Stadium; Attendance: 10,603; Referee: Itaru Hirose

31 March 2012 4	Albirex Niigata	1–1	Gamba Osaka	Niigata
16:00 JST	Alan Mineiro 5'	Report	22' Rafinha	Stadium: Big Swan; Attendance: 16,836; Referee: Kenji Ogiya

7 April 2012 5	Albirex Niigata	0–0	Yokohama F. Marinos	Niigata
15:00 JST		Report		Stadium: Big Swan; Attendance: 15,854; Referee: Ryuji Sato

14 April 2012 6	Cerezo Osaka	0–1	Albirex Niigata	Osaka
19:00 JST		Report	85' Yano	Stadium: Kincho Stadium; Attendance: 9,154; Referee: Minoru Tōjō

21 April 2012 7	Sagan Tosu	1–0	Albirex Niigata	Tosu
17:00 JST	Tanaka (yellow card) 19'; Tozim 81'	Report	Mikado (yellow card) 32'; Michael (yellow card) 84'	Stadium: Best Amenity Stadium; Attendance: 5,432; Referee: Yuichi Nishimura

28 April 2012 8	Albirex Niigata	0–1	Vegalta Sendai	Niigata
16:00 JST	Yano (yellow card) 45+1'; Bruno Lopes (yellow card) 63' (yellow-red card) 90'; Kikuchi (yellow card) 67'; Homma (yellow card) 88'; Suzuki (yellow card) 88'; Higashiguchi (yellow card) 88'	Report	Park Ju-Sung (yellow card) 44'; Wilson 89' (pen.)	Stadium: Big Swan; Attendance: 24,637; Referee: Futoshi Nakamura

3 May 2012 9	Sanfrecce Hiroshima	0–1	Albirex Niigata	Hiroshima
16:00 JST	Moriwaki (yellow card) 15'; Mikić (yellow card) 25'; Nakajima (yellow card) 60'; Takahagi (yellow card) 79'	Report	Kikuchi 63'	Stadium: Big Arch; Attendance: 17,826; Referee: Kenji Ogiya

6 May 2012 10	Albirex Niigata	0–2	FC Tokyo	Niigata
19:00 JST	Kim Jin-Su (yellow card) 83'	Report	Mukuhara (yellow card) 47'; Kajiyama 51'; Yazawa 70'	Stadium: Big Swan; Attendance: 21,827; Referee: Nobutsugu Murakami

12 May 2012 11	Urawa Reds	1–1	Albirex Niigata	Saitama
16:00 JST	Márcio Richardes 11'; Abe (yellow card) 84'	Report	Bruno Lopes 29' (yellow card) 36'; Kikuchi (yellow card) 45+2'; Tanaka (yellow card) 73'	Stadium: Saitama Stadium; Attendance: 31,818; Referee: Ryuji Sato

19 May 2012 12	Albirex Niigata	1–6	Júbilo Iwata	Niigata
15:00 JST	Kim Jin-Su (yellow card) 33' (yellow-red card) 45+2'; Higashiguchi (yellow card) 53'; Kobayashi 63' (o.g.)	Report	Cho Byung-Kuk 7' (yellow card) 62'; Maeda 15', 79'; Kobayashi 48'; Matsuura 68'; Yamazaki (yellow card) 88'; Yamada 90+1'	Stadium: Big Swan; Attendance: 21,920; Referee: Hiroyuki Kimura

26 May 2012 13	Kashiwa Reysol	1–0	Albirex Niigata	Kashiwa
18:30 JST	Kondo (yellow card) 36'; Nasu (yellow card) 71'; Otani (yellow card) 84'; Sawa 86'	Report	Murakami (yellow card) 13'; Tanaka (yellow card) 16'; Yano (yellow card) 63'	Stadium: Hitachi Soccer Stadium; Attendance: 12,931; Referee: Futoshi Nakamura

16 June 2012 14	Albirex Niigata	1–0	Shimizu S-Pulse	Niigata
19:00 JST	Kim Jin-Su (yellow card) 5'; Fujita 39'; Michael (yellow card) 61'; Bruno Lopes (yellow card) 69'; Higashiguchi (yellow card) 89'	Report	Sugiyama (yellow card) 27'; Tsujio (yellow card) 59'	Stadium: Big Swan; Attendance: 23,797; Referee: Minoru Tojo

23 June 2012 15	Vissei Kobe	1–0	Albirex Niigata	Kobe
19:00 JST	Ogawa 58'; Ōkubo (yellow card) 76'	Report		Stadium: Home's Stadium; Attendance: 16,727; Referee: Masaaki Iemoto

30 June 2012 16	Albirex Niigata	1–1	Kashima Antlers	Niigata
19:00 JST	Michael 37'; Suzuki (yellow card) 73'; Mikado (yellow card) 90+1'	Report	Sergio Dutra Junior 17'; Iwamasa (yellow card) 68'; Aoki (yellow card) 76'; Ogasawara (yellow card) 88'	Stadium: Big Swan; Attendance: 35,506; Referee: Yoshiro Imamura

7 July 2012 17	Consadole Sapporo	0–1	Albirex Niigata	Sapporo
14:00 JST		Report	Tanaka 5'; Mikado (yellow card) 31'; Murakami (yellow card) 48'	Stadium: Atsubetsu Park; Attendance: 7,673; Referee: (Japan) Yudai Yamamoto

14 July 2012 18	Albirex Niigata	0–0	Urawa Reds	Niigata
19:00 JST	Tanaka (yellow card) 85'; Ohi (yellow card) 90'	Report	Hirakawa (yellow card) 16'; Umesaki (yellow card) 74'	Stadium: Big Swan; Attendance: 33,998; Referee: (Japan) Hiroyoshi Takayama

28 July 2012 19	FC Tokyo	0–2	Albirex Niigata	Chōfu
19:30 JST		Report	Mikado 32'; Alan Mineiro 67'; Michael (yellow card) 85'	Stadium: Ajinomoto Stadium; Attendance: 23,430; Referee: (Japan) Takuya Maeda

4 August 2012 20	Albirex Niigata	1–1	Kashiwa Reysol	Niigata
20:00 JST	Bruno Lopes (yellow card) 29'; Homma (yellow card) 62' (yellow-red card) 69'; Yano 63' (yellow card) 69'	Report	Leandro Domingues (yellow card) 28'; Nasu (yellow card) 41'; Jorge Wagner 45'; Tanaka (yellow card) 77'; Hashimoto (yellow card) 89'	Stadium: Big Swan; Attendance: 25,050; Referee: (Japan) Haruhiro Otsuka

11 August 2012 21	Yokohama F. Marinos	3–2	Albirex Niigata	Yokohama
19:00 JST	Nakazawa 62', 87'; Marquinhos 69'; Taniguchi (yellow card) 85'	Report	Tanaka 18', 65'; Michael (yellow card) 73'	Stadium: Nippatsu Stadium; Attendance: 11,992; Referee: (Japan) Koichiro Fukushima

18 August 2012 22	Albirex Niigata	0–2	Sanfrecce Hiroshima	Niigata
20:00 JST	Suzuki (yellow card) 82'; Yano (yellow card) 83'	Report	Satō 26'; Ishihara 55'	Stadium: Big Swan; Attendance: 32,014; Referee: (Japan) Yoshiro Imamura

25 August 2012 23	Kashima Antlers	0–1	Albirex Niigata	Kashima
18:30 JST	Shibasaki (yellow card) 24'	Report	Michael 38'; Tsubouchi (yellow card) 46'	Stadium: Kashima Stadium; Attendance: 12,729; Referee: (Japan) Toshimitsu Yoshida

1 September 2012 24	Albirex Niigata	0–1	Cerezo Osaka	Niigata
19:00 JST	Michael (yellow card) 62'	Summary	Kakitani 81'	Stadium: Big Swan; Attendance: 24,601; Referee: (Japan) Futoshi Nakamura

15 September 2012 25	Gamba Osaka	1–1	Albirex Niigata	Suita
20:00	Leandro 15' (yellow card) 17'	Report	Michael (yellow card) 40'; Bruno Lopes 90+1' (yellow card) 90+5'	Stadium: Expo '70 Stadium; Attendance: 17,381; Referee: (Japan) Ryuji Sato

22 September 2012 26	Júbilo Iwata	0–0	Albirex Niigata	Iwata
17:00	Yamazaki (yellow card) 5'	Summary		Stadium: Yamaha Stadium; Attendance: 11,118; Referee: (Japan) Yoshiro Imamura

29 September 2012 27	Albirex Niigata	5–0	Nagoya Grampus	Niigata
15:00	Michael 56', 64'; Murakami 73'; Bruno Lopes 90'; Tsubouchi 90+5'	Summary	Nagai (yellow card) 55'; Tanaka (yellow card) 70'	Stadium: Big Swan; Attendance: 22,079; Referee: (Japan) Tomoya Maeda

6 October 2012 28	Albirex Niigata	0–0	Vissel Kobe	Niigata
16:00 JST	Murakami (yellow card) 72'	Summary	Kitamoto (yellow card) 54'; Ōkubo (yellow card) 68'	Stadium: Big Swan; Attendance: 23,849; Referee: (Japan) Hajime Matsuo

20 October 2012 29	Omiya Ardija	1–1	Albirex Niigata	Saitama
16:00	Aoki 44'	Summary	Murakami (yellow card) 9'; Tanaka 38'; Suzuki (yellow card) 53'; Bruno Lopes (yellow card) 90+2'	Stadium: NACK5 Stadium; Attendance: 11,944; Referee: (Japan) Minoru Tojo

27 October 2012 30	Albirex Niigata	0–2	Sagan Tosu	Niigata
18:00	Kim Jin-Su (yellow card) 22'; Ohi (yellow card) 63'	Summary	Toyoda 3', 38'; Fujita (yellow card) 71'; Kim Min-Woo (yellow card) 72'; Niwa (yellow card) 78'	Stadium: Big Swan; Attendance: 23,254; Referee: (Japan) Hiroyoshi Takayama

7 November 2012 31	Shimizu S-Pulse	0–1	Albirex Niigata	Shimizu
19:00	Sugiyama (yellow card) 71'	Summary	Bruno Lopes (yellow card) 57'; Ishikawa 59'	Stadium: Nihondaira Stadium; Attendance: 8,710; Referee: (Japan) Yoshiro Imamura

17 November 2012 32	Albirex Niigata	0–1	Kawasaki Frontale	Niigata
14:03 JST		Report	Kobayashi 90+5'	Stadium: Big Swan; Attendance: 25,738; Referee: Hiroshi Yamaguchi

24 November 2012 33	Vegalta Sendai	0–1	Albirex Niigata	Sendai
14:34 JST		Report	Kim Jin-Su 17'	Stadium: Yurtec Stadium; Attendance: 18,526; Referee: Nobutsugu Murakami

1 December 2012 34	Albirex Niigata	4–1	Consadole Sapporo	Niigata
15:33 JST	Tsubouchi 8'; Bruno Lopes 43'; Alan Mineiro 71'; Bruno Lopes 80'	Report	Sakaki 53'	Stadium: Big Swan; Attendance: 28,055; Referee: Hiroyuki Kimura

=== J.League Cup ===
Team	Pld	W	D	L	GF	GA	GD	Pts
Shimizu S-Pulse	6	5	0	1	12	4	+8	15
Kashima Antlers	6	5	0	1	10	5	+5	15
Albirex Niigata	6	3	1	2	6	5	+1	10
Yokohama F. Marinos	6	1	2	3	7	9	−2	5
Omiya Ardija	6	1	2	3	7	10	−3	5
Consadole Sapporo	6	1	2	3	6	11	−5	5
Vissel Kobe	6	1	1	4	6	10	−8	4

20 March 2012 Group Stage	Consadole Sapporo	0–1	Albirex Niigata	Sapporo
13:00 JST		Report	38' Alan Mineiro	Stadium: Sapporo Dome; Attendance: 7,487; Referee: Futoshi Nakamura

4 April 2012 Group Stage	Shimizu S-Pulse	1–0	Albirex Niigata	Shimizu
19:04 JST	Kobayashi 16'	Report		Stadium: Nihondaira Stadium; Attendance: 7,479; Referee: Masaaki Toma

18 April 2012 Group Stage	Albirex Niigata	1–0	Vissel Kobe	Niigata
19:03 JST	Hirai 27'	Report		Stadium: Big Swan; Attendance: 8,158; Referee: Toshimitsu Yoshida

6 June 2012 Group Stage	Albirex Niigata	0–1	Kashima Antlers	Niigata
19:00 JST	Homma (yellow card) 34'	Report	Iwamasa (yellow card) 77'; Osako 86'	Stadium: Big Swan; Attendance: 9,986; Referee: Ryuji Sato

9 June 2012 Group Stage	Yokohama F. Marinos	0–0	Albirex Niigata	Yokohama
13:00 JST	Nakazawa (yellow card) 69'	Report	Mikado (yellow card) 36'; Murakami (yellow card) 45+1'; Suzuki (yellow card) 85'	Stadium: Nippatsu Stadium; Attendance: 5,345; Referee: Yudai Yamamoto

27 June 2012 Group Stage	Albirex Niigata	4–3	Omiya Ardija	Niigata
19:00 JST	Kogure 61'; Hirai 73'; Suzuki 90'; Suzuki 90+4'	Report	Shimizu 15', 48'; Watanabe 40'	Stadium: Big Swan; Attendance: 7,664; Referee: Toshmitsu Yoshida

=== Emperor's Cup ===
9 September 2012 Round 2	Albirex Niigata	2–1 (a.e.t.)	Saurcos Fukui	Niigata
13:00	Bruno Lopes 56', 105+1'	Report	Yusuke Sakai 45+2'	Stadium: Niigata City Athletic Stadium; Attendance: 3,116; Referee: Yuichi Nishimura

10 October 2012 Round 3	Albirex Niigata	0–1	Fukushima United	Niigata
19:00		Report	Yoshihiro Masuko 63'	Stadium: Tohoku Electric Power Big Swan Stadium; Attendance: 3,460; Referee: Koichiro Fukushima

== Players ==
=== First team squad ===
Note: Flags indicate national team as defined under FIFA eligibility rules; some limited exceptions apply. Players may hold more than one non-FIFA nationality.

No.	Pos.	Nation	Player
1	GK	JPN	Takaya Kurokawa
3	DF	JPN	Kentaro Ohi
4	DF	JPN	Daisuke Suzuki (vice-captain)
5	DF	JPN	Naoki Ishikawa
6	MF	JPN	Yuta Mikado
7	MF	JPN	Seiya Fujita
8	MF	JPN	Fumiya Kogure
9	FW	JPN	Kisho Yano
10	MF	BRA	Michael
11	FW	BRA	Bruno Lopes
13	MF	JPN	Taisuke Nakamura
14	FW	JPN	Shoki Hirai
15	MF	JPN	Isao Homma (captain)
16	MF	KOR	Kim Young-Geun
17	DF	JPN	Jun Uchida

No.	Pos.	Nation	Player
18	MF	BRA	Alan Mineiro
19	DF	KOR	Kim Jin-Su
20	DF	JPN	Shigeto Masuda
21	GK	JPN	Masaaki Higashiguchi
22	GK	JPN	Yasuhiro Watanabe
23	MF	JPN	Atomu Tanaka
25	DF	JPN	Yusuke Murakami
26	MF	JPN	Kenji Koyano
27	FW	JPN	Bruno Castanheira
28	FW	JPN	Musashi Suzuki
29	FW	JPN	Noriyoshi Sakai
30	GK	JPN	Hideaki Ozawa
32	MF	JPN	Yoshiyuki Kobayashi
36	DF	JPN	Naoya Kikuchi (vice-captain)

=== Pre-season transfers ===
In:

No.	Pos.	Nation	Player
3	DF	JPN	Kentaro Ohi (from Júbilo Iwata)
9	FW	JPN	Kisho Yano (from SC Freiburg)
13	MF	JPN	Taisuke Nakamura (on loan from Kyoto Sanga)
14	FW	JPN	Shoki Hirai (on loan from Gamba Osaka)
16	MF	KOR	Kim Young-Geun (from Soongsil University)
18	MF	BRA	Alan Mineiro (on loan from Paulista)
19	DF	KOR	Kim Jin-Su (from Kyung Hee University)
26	MF	JPN	Kenji Koyano (from Kashima Antlers)
27	FW	JPN	Bruno Castanheira (loan return from Albirex Niigata Singapore)
28	FW	JPN	Musashi Suzuki (from Kiryū Daiichi High School)
33	DF	JPN	Ryoma Nishimura (from youth academy)

Out:

No.	Pos.	Nation	Player
—	DF	JPN	Kazuhiko Chiba (to Sanfrecce Hiroshima)
—	DF	NZL	Michael Fitzgerald (on loan to V-Varen Nagasaki)
—	DF	JPN	Ayato Hasebe (to Ganju Iwate)
—	DF	JPN	Yohei Iwasaki (to Ganju Iwate)
—	DF	JPN	Ryoma Nishimura (on loan to Mauaense)
—	DF	JPN	Kazunari Ono (on loan to Shonan Bellmare)
—	DF	JPN	Gotoku Sakai (on loan to VfB Stuttgart)
—	MF	JPN	Masaru Kato (on loan to Ehime FC)
—	MF	JPN	Musashi Okuyama (on loan to Albirex Niigata Singapore)
—	MF	JPN	Hidetoshi Nakata (to Yokohama F. Marinos)
—	FW	BRA	Anderson (on loan to Fagiano Okayama)
—	FW	KOR	Cho Young-Cheol (to Omiya Ardija)
—	FW	JPN	Kengo Kawamata (on loan to Fagiano Okayama)
—	FW	JPN	Hideo Ōshima (to Consadole Sapporo)
