= 2014 Yokohama F. Marinos season =

Yokohama F. Marinos
2014 season
- Manager: Yasuhiro Higuchi
- Stadium: Nissan Stadium
- J.League Division 1: 12th
- Emperor's Cup: Second round
- J.League Cup: Quarter-finals
- 2014 AFC Champions League: Group stage
- Japanese Super Cup: Runners-up
Home colours	Away colours

The 2014 season was Yokohama F. Marinos' 43rd season of competitive football – its thirty-third season in the top division of Japanese football and its fifteenth season under its current name, since the merger of Yokohama Marinos and Yokohama Flügels in 1999.

== Competitions ==
=== Japanese Super Cup ===
22 February 2014	Sanfrecce Hiroshima	2–0	Yokohama F. Marinos	Tokyo
13:35	Notsuda 6'; Asano 66'	Report		Stadium: Kasumigaoka National Stadium

=== J.League ===
==== League table ====
Pos	Team	Pld	W	D	L	GF	GA	GD	Pts
5	Sagan Tosu	34	19	3	12	41	33	+8	60
6	Kawasaki Frontale	34	16	7	11	56	43	+13	55
7	Yokohama F. Marinos	34	14	9	11	37	29	+8	51
8	Sanfrecce Hiroshima	34	13	11	10	44	37	+7	50
9	FC Tokyo	34	12	12	10	47	33	+14	48

Updated to match(es) played on 8 December 2014. Source: J.League Data
Rules for classification: 1) points; 2) goal difference; 3) number of goals scored.

==== Matches ====
2 March 2014 1	Yokohama F. Marinos	2–0	Omiya Ardija	Kanagawa-ku
	Fujimoto 17'; Ito 87'	Report		Stadium: Nippatsu Mitsuzawa Stadium; Attendance: 23166

8 March 2014 2	Shimizu S-Pulse	0–1	Yokohama F. Marinos	Shizuoka
		Report	Saitō 13'	Stadium: Outsourcing Stadium Nihondaira; Attendance: 17877

15 March 2014 3	Yokohama F. Marinos	3–0	Tokushima Vortis	Yokohama
	Tomisawa 14'; Ito 60'; Fujimoto 77'	Report		Stadium: Nissan Stadium; Attendance: 11088

23 March 2014 4	Ventforet Kofu	1–0	Yokohama F. Marinos	Kōfu
	Ishihara 68'	Report		Stadium: Yamanashi Chuo Bank Stadium; Attendance: 12281

29 March 2014 5	Yokohama F. Marinos	1–3	Kashima Antlers	Yokohama
	Kurihara 42'	Report	Doi 54'; Nozawa 80'; Shibasaki 88'	Stadium: Nissan Stadium; Attendance: 27764

6 April 2014 6	Albirex Niigata	0–0	Yokohama F. Marinos	Niigata
		Report		Stadium: Denka Big Swan Stadium; Attendance: 21132

12 April 2014 7	Yokohama F. Marinos	0–2	Vegalta Sendai	Yokohama
		Report	Akamine 66', 80'	Stadium: Nissan Stadium; Attendance: 19181

19 April 2014 8	Kashiwa Reysol	0–0	Yokohama F. Marinos	Kashiwa
		Report		Stadium: Hitachi Kashiwa Soccer Stadium; Attendance: 11436

26 April 2014 9	Yokohama F. Marinos	0–1	FC Tokyo	Yokohama
		Report	Higashi 7'	Stadium: International Stadium Yokohama; Attendance: 26058

29 April 2014 10	Urawa Red Diamonds	1–0	Yokohama F. Marinos	Saitama
	Lee 56'	Report		Stadium: Saitama Stadium 2002; Attendance: 38226

3 May 2014 11	Yokohama F. Marinos	2–0	Gamba Osaka	Yokohama
	Fujita 52'; Nakazawa 61'	Report		Stadium: International Stadium Yokohama; Attendance: 35550

10 May 2014 12	Yokohama F. Marinos	1–2	Sagan Tosu	Yokohama
	Nakamura 90'	Report	Kim 10'; Ikeda 16'	Stadium: International Stadium Yokohama; Attendance: 19606

18 May 2014 13	Kawasaki Frontale	0–3	Yokohama F. Marinos	Kawasaki
		Report	Kurihara 43'; Ito 57'; Nakazawa 88'	Stadium: Todoroki Athletics Stadium; Attendance: 19668

15 July 2014 14	Sanfrecce Hiroshima	1–2	Yokohama F. Marinos	Hiroshima
11:00	Ishihara 56'	Summary	Saitō 90'; Ito 90+4'	Stadium: Hiroshima Big Arch; Attendance: 9,515; Referee: (Japan) Hiroyuki Kimura

19 July 2014 15	Cerezo Osaka	2–2	Yokohama F. Marinos	Osaka
11:00	Hirano 45'; Ogihara (yellow card) 77'; Sugimoto 90+1'	Summary	Shimohira (yellow card) 21'; Maruhashi 66' (o.g.); Saitō 80'	Stadium: Nagai Stadium; Attendance: 30,188; Referee: (Japan) Futoshi Nakamura

23 July 2014 16	Yokohama F. Marinos	1–1	Vissel Kobe	Yokohama
11:30	Ogura (yellow card) 8'; Hyodo 22'	Summary	Pedro Júnior 18'; Okui (yellow card) 45'; Takahashi (yellow card) 65'	Stadium: International Stadium Yokohama; Attendance: 13,445; Referee: (Japan) Ryuji Sato

27 July 2014 17	Nagoya Grampus	1–1	Yokohama F. Marinos	Nagoya
11:00	Leandro Domingues (yellow card) 19'; Asahi Yada (yellow card) 31'; Nagai 82'	Summary	Nakamura 24'; Kobayashi (yellow card) 67'; Ogura (yellow card) 72'; Kurihara (yellow card) 90'	Stadium: Mizuho Athletic Stadium; Attendance: 16,261; Referee: (Japan) Takuto Okabe

2 August 2014 18	Gamba Osaka	2–0	Yokohama F. Marinos	Suita
10:00	Usami (yellow card) 46'; Yonekura (yellow card) 52'; Patric 82'; Endō 89'; Futagawa (yellow card) 90+4'	Summary	Ogura (yellow card) 29'; Kobayashi (yellow card) 38'; Nakazawa (yellow card) 81'	Stadium: Osaka Expo '70 Stadium; Attendance: 15,363; Referee: (Japan) Jumpei Iida

9 August 2014 19	Yokohama F. Marinos	2–2	Kashiwa Reysol	Yokohama
11:00	Rafinha 20'; Saitō 23'	Summary	Takayama (yellow card) 11'; Suzuki 32'; Masushima 70'; Kurisawa (yellow card) 77'	Stadium: International Stadium Yokohama; Attendance: 24,544; Referee: (Japan) Yuichi Nishimura

16 August 2014 20	Tokushima Vortis	0–3	Yokohama F. Marinos	Naruto
11:00	Hasegawa (yellow card) 25'; Vélez (yellow card) 54'; Fujiwara (yellow card) 59'	Summary	Nakamura 27'; Rafinha 30' 90+2'; Kobayashi (yellow card) 90+1'	Stadium: Pocarisweat Stadium; Attendance: 12,034; Referee: (Japan) Hiroyuki Kimura

23 August 2014 21	Yokohama F. Marinos	2–0	Kawasaki Frontale	Yokohama
11:00	Rafinha 3' (pen.) (yellow card) 55'; Fujimoto (yellow card) 61'; Hyodo 76'	Summary	Noborizato (yellow card) 3' (yellow-red card); Saneto (yellow card) 11'; Jeci (yellow card) 54'	Stadium: International Stadium Yokohama; Attendance: 14,014; Referee: (Japan) Maasaki Iemoto

30 August 2014 22	Vegalta Sendai	1–2	Yokohama F. Marinos	Sendai
11:00	Sugai 31'; Wilson (yellow card) 55'	Summary	Kurihara 18'; Shimohira 90+3'	Stadium: Yurtec Stadium Sendai; Attendance: 17,468; Referee: (Japan) Ryuji Sato

13 September 2014 23	Yokohama F. Marinos	0–2	Nagoya Grampus	Yokohama
11:00	Ogura (yellow card) 37'	Summary	Kawamata 35'; Nagai 48'; Honda (yellow card) 67'	Stadium: International Stadium Yokohama; Attendance: 25,045; Referee: (Japan) Yudai Yamamoto

20 September 2014 24	Kashima Antlers	1–0	Yokohama F. Marinos	Kashima
11:00	Endo 38'	Summary	Kurihara (yellow card) 69'	Stadium: Kashima Soccer Stadium; Attendance: 17,834; Referee: (Japan) Yoshiro Imamura

23 September 2014 25	Yokohama F. Marinos	1–0	Sanfrecce Hiroshima	Yokohama
07:00	Ito 87' (pen.)	Summary	Hayashi (yellow card) 87'	Stadium: International Stadium Yokohama; Attendance: 23,438; Referee: (Japan) Itaru Hirose

27 September 2014 26	Yokohama F. Marinos	0–0	Ventforet Kofu	Yokohama
06:00	Yuta Narawa (yellow card) 18'	Summary	Kawamoto (yellow card) 4'; Gilsinho (yellow card) 22'	Stadium: Nippatsu Mitsuzawa Stadium; Attendance: 12,953; Referee: (Japan) Akihiko Ikeuchi

5 October 2014 27	Sagan Tosu	1–0	Yokohama F. Marinos	Tosu
07:00	Toyoda 38' (yellow card) 90+3'	Summary	Tomisawa (yellow card) 90+2'	Stadium: Tosu Stadium; Attendance: 12,632; Referee: (Japan) Nobutsugu Murakami

18 October 2014 28	Yokohama F. Marinos	v	Shimizu S-Pulse	Yokohama
07:00				Stadium: International Stadium Yokohama

=== Emperor's Cup ===
12 July 2014 Second round	Yokohama F. Marinos	3–0	Honda Lock	Kanagawa-ku
18:00	Hyōdō 45+1'; Hanato 50'; Amano 85'	Report		Stadium: Nippatsu Mitsuzawa Stadium; Attendance: 5,821; Referee: Akihiko Ikeuchi

20 August 2014 Third round	Yokohama F. Marinos	2–3 (a.e.t.)	Giravanz Kitakyushu	Kanagawa-ku
11:00	Fujimoto 12' 45+2'	Summary	Watanabe 8'; Naito 85'; Watari 120'	Stadium: Nippatsu Mitsuzawa Stadium

=== J.League Cup ===
Quarter-finals	v

=== AFC Champions League ===
==== Group stage ====
Pos	Team	Pld	W	D	L	GF	GA	GD	Pts	Qualification	GUA	JEO	MEL	YFM
1	(China) Guangzhou Evergrande	6	3	1	2	10	8	+2	10	Advance to knockout stage	—	3–1	4–2	2–1
2	(South Korea) Jeonbuk Hyundai Motors	6	2	2	2	8	7	+1	8	Advance to knockout stage	1–0	—	0–0	3–0
3	(Australia) Melbourne Victory	6	2	2	2	9	9	0	8		2–0	2–2	—	1–0
4	(Japan) Yokohama F. Marinos	6	2	1	3	7	10	−3	7		1–1	2–1	3–2	—

26 February 2014 1	Jeonbuk Hyundai Motors (South Korea)	3–0	(Japan) Yokohama F. Marinos	Jeonju, South Korea
19:00 UTC+9	Lee Seung-gi 61', 69'; Leonardo 72' (pen.)	Report		Stadium: Jeonju World Cup Stadium; Attendance: 8,328; Referee: Abdullah Balideh (Qatar)

12 March 2014 2	Yokohama F. Marinos (Japan)	1–1	(China) Guangzhou Evergrande	Yokohama, Japan
19:30 UTC+9	Hanato 21'	Report	Diamanti 38'	Stadium: International Stadium Yokohama; Attendance: 12,230; Referee: Marai Al Awaji (Saudi Arabia)

18 March 2014 3	Melbourne Victory (Australia)	1–0	(Japan) Yokohama F. Marinos	Melbourne, Australia
19:30 UTC+11	Barbarouses 9'	Report		Stadium: Melbourne Rectangular Stadium; Attendance: 6,357; Referee: Mohd Amirul Izwan Bin Yaacob (Malaysia)

2 April 2014 4	Yokohama F. Marinos (Japan)	3–2	(Australia) Melbourne Victory	Yokohama, Japan
19:30 UTC+9	Ito 21'; Nakamachi 27'; Hyodo 89'	Report	Troisi 7' (pen.); J. Jeggo 90+2'	Stadium: International Stadium Yokohama; Attendance: 7,395; Referee: Ammar Al-Jeneibi (United Arab Emirates)

15 April 2014 5	Yokohama F. Marinos (Japan)	2–1	(South Korea) Jeonbuk Hyundai Motors	Yokohama, Japan
19:30 UTC+9	Saitō 64', 65'	Report	Han Kyo-won 7'	Stadium: International Stadium Yokohama; Attendance: 7,110; Referee: Valentin Kovalenko (Uzbekistan)

22 April 2014 6	Guangzhou Evergrande (China)	2–1	(Japan) Yokohama F. Marinos	Guangzhou, China
19:00 UTC+8	Elkeson 11', 38'	Report	Saitō 85'	Stadium: Tianhe Stadium; Attendance: 39,874; Referee: Mohamed Al Zarouni (United Arab Emirates)

== Squad information ==
=== Playing statistics ===
As of 18 May 2014

Appearances (Apps.) numbers are for appearances in competitive games only including sub appearances

No.	Nat.	Player	Pos.	J.League				Emperor's Cup				J.League Cup				Champions League				Super Cup				Total			
No.	Nat.	Player	Pos.	Apps	Goal	Yellow card	Red card	Apps	Goal	Yellow card	Red card	Apps	Goal	Yellow card	Red card	Apps	Goal	Yellow card	Red card	Apps	Goal	Yellow card	Red card	Apps	Goal	Yellow card	Red card
1	(Japan)	Tetsuya Enomoto	GK	13												6				1				20			
4	(Japan)	Yuzo Kurihara	DF	13	2	1										4		1		1		1		18	2	3	
5	(Brazil)	Dutra	DF	2												2				1		1		5		1	
6	(Japan)	Shōhei Ogura	MF	8		1										4		1						12		2	
7	(Japan)	Shingō Hyōdō	MF	10												5	1	1		1				16	1	1	
8	(Japan)	Kosuke Nakamachi	MF	11		2										6	1			1				18	1	2	
9	(Japan)	Takuro Yajima	FW	5												2				1				8			
10	(Japan)	Shunsuke Nakamura	MF	13	1											5				1				19	1		
11	(Japan)	Manabu Saitō	FW	12	1											5	3			1				18	4		
13	(Japan)	Yuzo Kobayashi	DF	11		2										6				1		1		18		3	
14	(Japan)	Andrew Kumagai	MF													1								1			
15	(Brazil)	Fabio	DF													3								3			
16	(Japan)	Sho Ito	FW	13	3	1										4	1							17	4	1	
17	(Japan)	Jin Hanato	MF	1												2	1			1				4	1		
19	(Japan)	Yoshihito Fujita	FW	6	1											3								9	1		
20	(Japan)	Yūhei Satō	MF	6												3								9			
21	(Japan)	Hiroki Iikura	GK																								
22	(Japan)	Yuji Nakazawa	DF	13	2											5				1				19	2		
23	(Japan)	Takumi Shimohira	DF	11												2				1				14			
24	(Japan)	Yuta Narawa	DF	5												4								9			
25	(Japan)	Jungo Fujimoto	MF	10	2	1										4				1				15	2	1	
26	(Japan)	Yuta Mikado	MF	6												5								11			
27	(Japan)	Seitaro Tomisawa	DF	10	1	4										3				1		1		14	1	5	
28	(Japan)	Takuya Kida	MF																								
29	(Japan)	Jun Amano	MF																								
30	(Japan)	Yuji Rokutan	GK																								
31	(Japan)	Ryota Suzuki	GK																								
32	(Japan)	Sho Matsumoto	MF																								
33	(Japan)	Fumitaka Kitatani	DF																								
Own goals					0				0				0				0				0				0		
Totals					13	12	0		0	0	0		0	0	0		7	3	0		0	4	0		20	19	0

=== Goalscorers ===
Includes all competitive matches. The list is sorted alphabetically by surname when total goals are equal.

Correct as of game played on 18 May 2014

No.	Nat.	Player	Pos.	J.League	Emperor's Cup	J.League Cup	Champions League	Super Cup	TOTAL
16	(Japan)	Sho Ito	FW	3	0	0	1	0	4
11	(Japan)	Manabu Saitō	FW	1	0	0	3	0	4
25	(Japan)	Jungo Fujimoto	MF	2	0	0	0	0	2
4	(Japan)	Yuzo Kurihara	DF	2	0	0	0	0	2
22	(Japan)	Yuji Nakazawa	DF	2	0	0	0	0	2
19	(Japan)	Yoshihito Fujita	FW	1	0	0	0	0	1
17	(Japan)	Jin Hanato	MF	0	0	0	1	0	1
7	(Japan)	Shingō Hyōdō	DF	0	0	0	1	0	1
8	(Japan)	Kosuke Nakamachi	MF	0	0	0	1	0	1
10	(Japan)	Shunsuke Nakamura	DF	1	0	0	0	0	1
27	(Japan)	Seitaro Tomisawa	DF	1	0	0	0	0	1
Own Goals				0	0	0	0	0	0
Totals				13	0	0	7	0	20

== See also ==
- List of Yokohama F. Marinos seasons
