= Yuji Ono (footballer) =

Japanese association footballer

Yuji Ono 小野 裕二
Personal information
- Full name: Yuji Ono
- Date of birth: December 22, 1992 (age 33)
- Place of birth: Yokosuka, Kanagawa, Japan
- Height: 1.70 m (5 ft 7 in)
- Position: Attacking midfielder

Team information
- Current team: Albirex Niigata
- Number: 99

Youth career
- Johoku Fighters
- –2010: Yokohama F. Marinos

Senior career*
Years	Team	Apps	(Gls)
2010–2012	Yokohama F. Marinos	79	(9)
2013–2015	Standard Liège	19	(1)
2015–2017	Sint-Truiden	28	(0)
2017–2019	Sagan Tosu	68	(6)
2020–2021	Gamba Osaka	18	(2)
2022–2023	Sagan Tosu	54	(11)
2024–	Albirex Niigata	42	(5)
- * Club domestic league appearances and goals as of 16 August 2026

Yuji Ono (小野 裕二, Ono Yūji; born December 22, 1992) is a Japanese footballer who plays as an attacking midfielder for J2 League club Albirex Niigata.

== Club career ==
Born in Yokosuka, next to a satellite city of Yokohama. Ono joined Yokohama F. Marinos youth academy at age 13. He was a member of the Yokohama F. Marinos youth team that won the Prince Takamado Cup in 2009 beating Júbilo Iwata. Ono made his competitive debut in a J1 League match against Sanfrecce Hiroshima at Hiroshima Big Arch on July 18, 2010, as a 62nd-minute substitute for Shingo Hyodo. At 17 years and 208 days, he was club's youngest-ever league debutante, a record previously held by Kota Mizunuma (17 years and 247 days). Two months later, on September 5, 2009, Ono scored his first goal in a 3–1 victory against V-Varen Nagasaki in the Emperor's Cup. In January 2011, he signed a new long-term contract with Marinos.

On July 20, 2015, Ono signed a contract with Sint-Truiden.

== International career ==
In February 2011, Ono was called up to the Japan national under-23 football team, or the "U-22 team". He earned his first cap for the Japan U-22's against Bahrain U-22's on February 12, 2011.

== Personal life ==
Yuji's older brother, Yuto Ono, is also a footballer who currently plays as a midfielder for J2 League club FC Gifu.

== Club statistics ==
Updated to February 24, 2019.

Club	Season	League		Cup^{1}		League Cup^{2}		Continental		Total	
Club	Season	Apps	Goals	Apps	Goals	Apps	Goals	Apps	Goals	Apps	Goals
Yokohama F. Marinos	2010	17	3	3	2	0	0	-		20	5
Yokohama F. Marinos	2011	29	4	5	3	4	0	-		38	7
Yokohama F. Marinos	2012	33	2	5	1	6	1	-		44	4
Yokohama F. Marinos	Total	79	9	13	6	10	1	-		102	16
Standard Liège	2012–13	9	0	0	0	-		-		9	0
Standard Liège	2013–14	0	0	0	0	-		-		0	0
Standard Liège	2014–15	24	1	2	1	-		4	0	30	2
Standard Liège	Total	33	1	2	1	-		4	0	39	2
Sint-Truiden	2015–16	26	0	0	0	-		-		26	0
Sint-Truiden	2016–17	6	0	–		–		–		6	0
Sint-Truiden	Total	32	0	0	0	-		0	0	32	0
Sagan Tosu	2017	19	2	1	0	2	0	-		22	2
Sagan Tosu	2018	30	4	4	1	1	1	-		35	6
Sagan Tosu	Total	49	6	5	1	3	1	0	0	57	8
Career total		193	16	20	8	13	2	4	0	230	26

^{1}Includes Emperor's Cup and Belgian Cup.

^{2}Includes J.League Cup.
