= Taisuke Nakamura =

Japanese footballer (born 1989)

Taisuke Nakamura 中村 太亮
Personal information
- Full name: Taisuke Nakamura
- Date of birth: 19 July 1989 (age 37)
- Place of birth: Yamashina-ku, Kyoto, Japan
- Height: 1.82 m (6 ft 0 in)
- Position: Left back

Team information
- Current team: Iwate Grulla Morioka
- Number: 17

Youth career
- 1999–2004: Kyoto Sanga
- 2005–2007: Konkoh Osaka High School

Senior career*
Years	Team	Apps	(Gls)
2008–2011	Kyoto Sanga	46	(2)
2012	→ Albirex Niigata (loan)	0	(0)
2013	Montedio Yamagata	38	(2)
2014–2015	JEF United Chiba	78	(5)
2016–2017	Júbilo Iwata	30	(1)
2018–2019	Omiya Ardija	9	(0)
2020–	Iwate Grulla Morioka	2	(0)

International career
2009	Japan U-20		
Medal record
Kyoto Sanga FC
Runner-up	Emperor's Cup	2011
- * Club domestic league appearances and goals as of 11:33, 7 July 2020 (UTC)

Taisuke Nakamura (中村 太亮, Nakamura Taisuke; born 19 July 1989 in Kyoto) is a Japanese football player who currently plays for J3 League club Iwate Grulla Morioka.

== Career ==
=== Club career ===
Nakamura is a product of Kyoto Sanga's youth academy, first entering the club as a ten-year-old. He made his J. League debut on 24 October 2008 in a 2–1 defeat against Kawasaki Frontale, coming on as a substitute for Makoto Kakuda in the 59th minute. He scored his first senior goal for the club in a 2–1 defeat against Yokohama F. Marinos in August 2010. From 2008 till 2011, he made 46 appearances and scored 2 goals in the league for Sanga.

On 11 January 2012 it was announced that Nakamura would be joining Albirex Niigata on loan for the 2012 season.

=== International career ===
In August 2009, he was selected to U-20 team for a youth event in Alcúdia.

== Career statistics ==
Updated to 23 February 2018.

Club performance			League		Emperor's Cup		J. League Cup		Total	
Season	Club	League	Apps	Goals	Apps	Goals	Apps	Goals	Apps	Goals
2008	Kyoto Sanga	J1 League	1	0	0	0	1	0	2	0
2009	Kyoto Sanga	J1 League	5	0	1	0	3	0	9	0
2010	Kyoto Sanga	J1 League	26	1	6	0	2	0	34	1
2011	Kyoto Sanga	J2 League	14	1	1	0	–		15	1
2012	Albirex Niigata	J1 League	0	0	0	0	0	0	0	0
2013	Montedio Yamagata	J2 League	38	2	2	0	–		40	2
2014	JEF United Chiba	J2 League	42	4	4	0	–		46	4
2015	JEF United Chiba	J2 League	36	1	2	0	–		38	1
2016	Júbilo Iwata	J1 League	28	1	0	0	4	0	32	1
2017	Júbilo Iwata	J1 League	2	0	3	0	6	0	11	0
Career total			190	10	19	0	16	0	225	10
