= List of Yokohama F. Marinos seasons =

This is a list of seasons played by Yokohama F. Marinos in Japanese and Asian football, from 1972 (when the club, then known as Newton Heath Nissan Motors F.C., first entered the Kanagawa Prefectural League Division 2) to the most recent completed season. It details the club's achievements in major competitions.

== Record as J.League member ==
Season	Div.	Tms.	Pos.	Attendance/G	J.League Cup	Emperor's Cup	Asia	
1992	-				Group stage	Winner	-	
1993	J1	10	4	16,781	Group stage	Quarter-final	CWC	Winner
1994	J1	12	6	19,801	Semi-final	Semi-final	-	
1995	J1	14	1	18,326	Not held	2nd round	-	
1996	J1	16	3	14,589	Group stage	3rd round	-	
1997	J1	17	3	9,211	Group stage	4th round	CC	Quarter-final
1998	J1	18	4	19,165	Group stage	3rd round	-	
1999	J1	16	5	20,095	Quarter-final	Quarter-final	-	
2000	J1	16	2	16,644	Quarter-final	Quarter-final	-	
2001	J1	16	13	20,595	Winner	3rd round	-	
2002	J1	16	2	24,108	Group stage	4th round	-	
2003	J1	16	1	24,957	Quarter-final	Quarter-final	-	
2004	J1	16	1	24,818	Quarter-final	5th round	CL	Group stage
2005	J1	18	9	25,713	Semi-final	5th round	CL	Group stage
2006	J1	18	9	23,663	Semi-final	Quarter-final	-	
2007	J1	18	7	24,039	Semi-final	5th round	-	
2008	J1	18	9	23,682	Quarter-final	Semi-final	-	
2009	J1	18	10	22,057	Semi-final	4th round	-	
2010	J1	18	8	25,684	Group stage	4th round	-	
2011	J1	18	5	21,038	Quarter-final	Semi-final	-	
2012	J1	18	4	22,946	Group stage	Semi-final	-	
2013	J1	18	2	27,496	Semi-final	Winner	-	
2014	J1	18	7	23,088	Quarter-final	3rd round	CL	Group stage
2015	J1	18	7	24,221	Group stage	4th round	-	
2016	J1	18	10	24,004	Semi-final	Semi-final	-	
2017	J1	18	5	24,180	Group stage	Runners-up	-	
2018	J1	18	12	21,788	Runners-up	4th round	-	
2019	J1	18	1	27,010	Group stage	4th round	-	
2020	J1	18	9	7,968	Semi-final	Did not enter	CL	Round of 16
2021	J1	18	2	8,991	Playoff Stage	2nd round	-	
2022	J1	18	1	19,811	Quarter-finals	3rd Round	CL	Round of 16
2023	J1	18	2	27,301	Semi-finals	3rd Round	CL	Runners-up
2024	J1	18	9	24,843	Semi-finals	Semi-finals	CL	Runners-up
