= Seiya Fujita =

Japanese footballer

Seiya Fujita 藤田 征也
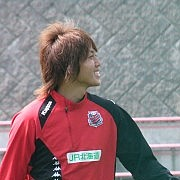

Personal information
- Full name: Seiya Fujita
- Date of birth: 2 June 1987 (age 39)
- Place of birth: Sapporo, Hokkaidō, Japan
- Height: 5 ft 9 in (1.75 m)
- Position: Right winger

Youth career
- 2003–2005: Consadole Sapporo

Senior career*
Years	Team	Apps	(Gls)
2005–2010	Consadole Sapporo	166	(13)
2011–2014	Albirex Niigata	63	(2)
2014	→ Shonan Bellmare (loan)	38	(1)
2015–2018	Shonan Bellmare	65	(2)
2019–2022	Tokushima Vortis	84	(2)

International career
2007	Japan U-20	4	(0)
Medal record
Shonan Bellmare
Winner	J.League Cup	2018
- * Club domestic league appearances and goals

Seiya Fujita (藤田 征也, Fujita Seiya; born 2 June 1987) is a Japanese former footballer who last played for Tokushima Vortis until 2022. In 2007, he was picked to join the U-20 Japan squad to compete 2007 FIFA U-20 World Cup in Canada.

== Club career ==
Fujita joined Consadole Sapporo youth academy at age 15. He was a member of Consadole's youth team that reached the final of the Prince Takamado Cup in 2005, Consadole lost 4–1 to Tokyo Verdy. He turned professional in December 2005. He made his first-team debut on 3 December 2005 in a J2 League match against Thespa Kusatsu.

On 23 December 2010, Fujita signed for Albirex Niigata for a fee believed to be around ¥50million. He made his debut on 5 March 2011 against Avispa Fukuoka.

On 7 January 2023, Tokushima Vortis announced his retirement. After his retirement, he will become an academy staff member of Hokkaido Consadole Sapporo.

== National team career ==
In July 2007, Fujita was elected Japan U-20 national team for 2007 U-20 World Cup. At this tournament, he played all 4 matches as right midfielder.

== Career statistics ==
=== Club ===
Updated to the end of 2022 season.

Club	League	Season	League		Emperor's Cup		J. League Cup		Total	
Club	League	Season	Apps	Goals	Apps	Goals	Apps	Goals	Apps	Goals
Consadole Sapporo	J2 League	2005	1	0	0	0	–		1	0
Consadole Sapporo	J2 League	2006	30	0	4	0	–		34	0
Consadole Sapporo	J2 League	2007	39	7	0	0	–		39	7
Consadole Sapporo	J1 League	2008	19	0	0	0	3	0	22	0
Consadole Sapporo	J2 League	2009	47	3	0	0	–		47	3
Consadole Sapporo	J2 League	2010	30	3	1	0	–		31	3
Albirex Niigata	J1 League	2011	18	1	0	0	1	0	19	1
Albirex Niigata	J1 League	2012	24	1	2	0	2	0	28	1
Albirex Niigata	J1 League	2013	21	0	1	0	4	0	26	0
Shonan Bellmare	J2 League	2014	38	1	1	0	-		39	1
Shonan Bellmare	J1 League	2015	24	1	1	0	1	0	26	1
Shonan Bellmare	J1 League	2016	22	0	4	0	2	0	28	0
Shonan Bellmare	J2 League	2017	15	1	0	0	-		15	1
Shonan Bellmare	J1 League	2018	4	0	3	0	0	0	7	0
Tokushima Vortis	J2 League	2019	22	1	0	0	0	0	22	1
Tokushima Vortis	J2 League	2020	36	1	2	0	0	0	38	1
Tokushima Vortis	J1 League	2021	15	0	0	0	6	0	21	0
Tokushima Vortis	J2 League	2022	11	0	1	0	0	0	12	0
Career total			416	20	20	0	21	0	457	20

=== National team ===
Team	Competition	Category	Appearances		Goals	Team Record
Team	Competition	Category	Start	Sub	Goals	Team Record
Japan	2007 FIFA U-20 World Cup	U-20	1	3	0	Round of 16
