= Michael (footballer, born 1982) =

Brazilian footballer

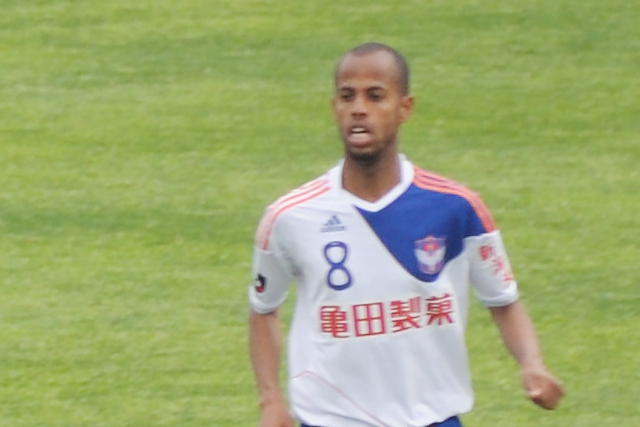

Personal information
- Full name: Michael Jefferson Nascimento
- Date of birth: 21 January 1982 (age 44)
- Place of birth: São Paulo, Brazil
- Height: 1.71 m (5 ft 7 in)
- Position: Midfielder

Team information
- Current team: EC São Bernardo (assistant coach)

Youth career
- 1997–1998: Juventus

Senior career*
Years	Team	Apps	(Gls)
1999–2002	São Caetano		
2002–2003	Corinthians		
2003–2004	CRAC		
2004–2006	Grêmio Barueri		
2005	→ Avaí (loan)		
2007–2008	Guaratinguetá		
2007	→ Ponte Preta (loan)	19	(1)
2008	→ Coritiba (loan)	11	(2)
2008–2009	JEF United Chiba	22	(3)
2010–2012	Albirex Niigata	83	(14)
2013	São Bernardo	12	(0)
2013–2014	Guaratinguetá	12	(0)
2014–2015	Santo André	0	(0)

Managerial career
- 2022–: EC São Bernardo (assistant)
- * Club domestic league appearances and goals

Michael Jefferson Nascimento (born 21 January 1982), known as Michael, is a Brazilian professional football coach and former player who is the assistant coach of EC São Bernardo. He played as a midfielder from 1997 until 2015, notably for Japanese club Albirex Niigata.

== Playing statistics ==
As of 31 January 2012

Appearances and goals by club, season and competition
Club	Season	League			National cup (Note: Includes Emperor's Cup.)		League cup (Note: Includes J. League Cup.)		Total	
Club	Season	Division	Apps	Goals	Apps	Goals	Apps	Goals	Apps	Goals
Coritiba	2008	Série A	11	2	0	0	−		11	2
JEF United Chiba	2008	J1 League	10	1	1	0	0	0	11	1
JEF United Chiba	2009	J1 League	12	2	0	0	3	0	15	2
Albirex Niigata	2010	J1 League	27	4	2	0	6	2	35	6
Albirex Niigata	2011	J1 League	30	6	1	0	2	1	33	7
Career total			90	15	4	0	11	3	105	18
