= Yusuke Murakami =

Japanese footballer (born 1984)

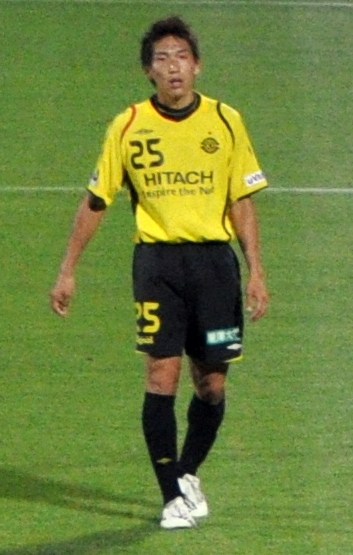

Personal information
- Full name: Yusuke Murakami
- Date of birth: April 27, 1984 (age 42)
- Place of birth: Tokyo, Japan
- Height: 1.79 m (5 ft 10 in)
- Position: Right back

Youth career
- 1995–1996: Furoku Soccer Club
- 1997: Yomiuri
- 1998–1999: FC Fuchū
- 2000–2002: Kokushikan High School
- 2003: Furoku Soccer Club
- 2004–2007: Juntendo University

Senior career*
Years	Team	Apps	(Gls)
2008–2011	Kashiwa Reysol	40	(8)
2011–2013	Albirex Niigata	48	(0)
2014–2015	Ehime FC	50	(2)
2016–2017	V-Varen Nagasaki	38	(2)
Medal record
Kashiwa Reysol
Winner	J1 League	2011
Runner-up	Emperor's Cup	2008
- * Club domestic league appearances and goals as of 2 February 2018

Yusuke Murakami (村上 佑介, Murakami Yūsuke; born April 27, 1984 in Tokyo) is a former Japanese footballer who last played as a right-back for V-Varen Nagasaki.

== Career ==
Murakami joined Kashiwa Reysol as an apprentice professional in 2007. He turned full-time professional with Reysol at the start of the 2008 season. He made his professional debut on 4 October 2008 in a 4-0 win over Omiya Ardija, scoring a first-half hat-trick.

Murakami transferred to Albirex Niigata on 23 December 2010, for an undisclosed fee. He made his club debut on 23 July 2011 against Kawasaki Frontale. He moved to Ehime FC on 1 February 2014 on a free transfer.

== Career statistics ==
Updated to 2 February 2018.

Appearances and goals by club, season and competition
Club	Season	League			Emperor's Cup		J.League Cup		Total	
Club	Season	Division	Apps	Goals	Apps	Goals	Apps	Goals	Apps	Goals
Kashiwa Reysol	2008	J1 League	6	3	5	0	2	0	13	3
Kashiwa Reysol	2009	J1 League	22	4	1	0	5	0	28	4
Kashiwa Reysol	2010	J2 League	7	1	0	0	–		7	1
Kashiwa Reysol	2011	J1 League	5	0	0	0	0	0	5	0
Albirex Niigata	2011	J1 League	15	0	1	0	2	0	18	0
Albirex Niigata	2012	J1 League	30	0	0	0	6	0	36	0
Albirex Niigata	2013	J1 League	3	0	0	0	2	0	5	0
Ehime FC	2014	J2 League	36	2	2	0	–		38	2
Ehime FC	2015	J2 League	14	0	1	0	–		15	0
V-Varen Nagasaki	2016	J2 League	32	2	0	0	–		32	2
V-Varen Nagasaki	2017	J2 League	6	0	1	0	–		7	0
Career total			176	12	11	0	17	0	204	12
