= Kosuke Nakamachi =

Japanese footballer

Kosuke Nakamachi 中町 公祐
Personal information
- Full name: Kosuke Nakamachi
- Date of birth: September 1, 1985 (age 41)
- Place of birth: Saitama, Japan
- Height: 1.74 m (5 ft 8 1/2 in)
- Position: Midfielder

Youth career
- 2001–2003: Takasaki High School

College career
Years	Team	Apps	(Gls)
2008–2009	Keio University		

Senior career*
Years	Team	Apps	(Gls)
2004–2007	Shonan Bellmare	66	(2)
2010–2011	Avispa Fukuoka	59	(12)
2012–2018	Yokohama F. Marinos	159	(13)
2019–2020	ZESCO United		
2021–2022	Mutondo Stars		
2022–202x	City of Lusaka		
Total		284	(27)
Medal record
Yokohama F. Marinos
Runner-up	J1 League	2013
Runner-up	J.League Cup	2018
Winner	Emperor's Cup	2013
Runner-up	Emperor's Cup	2017
- * Club domestic league appearances and goals as of end of 2018 season

Kosuke Nakamachi (中町 公祐, Nakamachi Kōsuke; born 1 September 1985) is a Japanese football player.

== Playing career ==
After coming runner-up in the J2 player of the Year awards 2010 while playing for Avispa Fukuoka he was installed as Club Captain for the club as they returned to J1 in 2011.

On 2 February 2019, Nakamachi joined Zambian team ZESCO United F.C.

However, within less than a year he was released by Zesco United F.C. in January 2020 for being "deemed as excess and not good enough for the eight-time Super League Champions" having "failed to really adapt and make any impact."

== Club statistics ==
Updated to 2 December 2018.

Club performance			League		Cup		League Cup		Continental		Total	
Season	Club	League	Apps	Goals	Apps	Goals	Apps	Goals	Apps	Goals	Apps	Goals
Japan			League		Emperor's Cup		J.League Cup		AFC		Total	
2004	Shonan Bellmare	J2 League	11	0	3	0	-		-		14	0
2005	Shonan Bellmare	J2 League	12	1	0	0	-		-		12	1
2006	Shonan Bellmare	J2 League	34	1	0	0	-		-		34	1
2007	Shonan Bellmare	J2 League	9	0	0	0	-		-		9	0
Total			66	2	3	0	-		-		69	2
2010	Avispa Fukuoka	J2 League	35	10	3	1	-		-		38	11
2011	Avispa Fukuoka	J1 League	24	2	2	1	1	0	-		27	3
Total			59	12	5	2	1	0	-		65	14
2012	Yokohama F. Marinos	J1 League	20	1	4	1	3	0	-		27	2
2013	Yokohama F. Marinos	J1 League	33	1	5	0	10	1	–		48	2
2014	Yokohama F. Marinos	J1 League	23	0	0	0	1	1	6	1	30	2
2015	Yokohama F. Marinos	J1 League	14	2	1	0	2	0	–		17	2
2016	Yokohama F. Marinos	J1 League	31	6	3	2	4	0	–		38	8
2017	Yokohama F. Marinos	J1 League	22	2	2	0	3	0	–		27	2
2018	Yokohama F. Marinos	J1 League	16	1	2	0	8	1	–		26	2
Career Total			284	27	25	5	32	3	6	1	347	36

== Honours ==
Yokohama F. Marinos

- Emperor's Cup: 2013
