= Yuzo Kobayashi =

Japanese footballer

Yuzo Kobayashi 小林 祐三
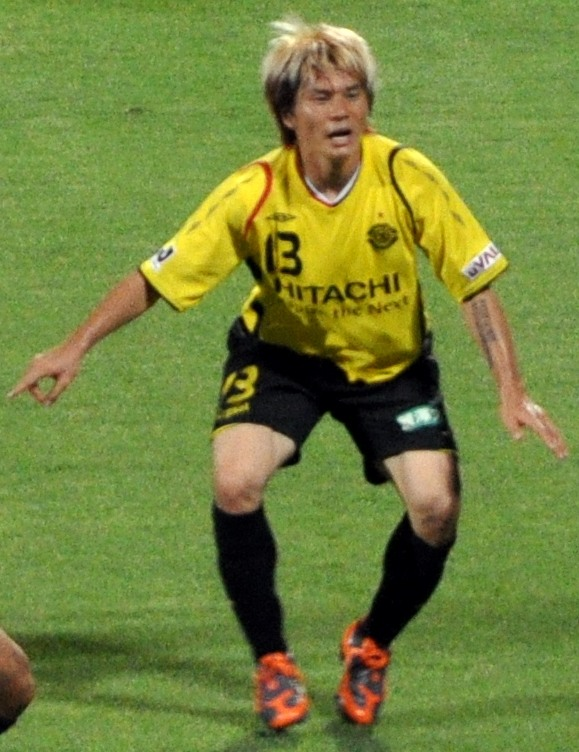

Personal information
- Full name: Yuzo Kobayashi
- Date of birth: 15 November 1985 (age 40)
- Place of birth: Hamura, Tokyo, Japan
- Height: 1.76 m (5 ft 9 1/2 in)
- Position: Defender

Youth career
- 2001–2003: Shizuoka Gakuen High School

Senior career*
Years	Team	Apps	(Gls)
2004–2010	Kashiwa Reysol	183	(3)
2011–2016	Yokohama F. Marinos	187	(3)
2017–2020	Sagan Tosu	65	(0)
2021	Criacao Shinjuku	16	(0)
Total		451	(6)

International career
2005	Japan U-20	4	(0)
Medal record
Kashiwa Reysol
Runner-up	Emperor's Cup	2008
Yokohama F. Marinos
Runner-up	J1 League	2013
Winner	Emperor's Cup	2013
Representing Japan
AFC U-19 Championship
Bronze medal – third place	2004 Malaysia
- * Club domestic league appearances and goals as of end of 2021 season

Yuzo Kobayashi (小林 祐三, Kobayashi Yūzō; born 15 November 1985) is a Japanese former professional footballer who played as a defender.

== National team career ==
In June 2005, Kobayashi was selected Japan U-20 national team for 2005 World Youth Championship. At this tournament, he played full time in all 4 matches as defensive midfielder.

== Club statistics ==
Appearances and goals by club, season and competition
Club performance			League		Cup		League Cup		Asia		Total	
Season	Club	League	Apps	Goals	Apps	Goals	Apps	Goals	Apps	Goals	Apps	Goals
Japan			League		Emperor's Cup		J.League Cup		AFC		Total	
2004	Kashiwa Reysol	J1 League	9	0	0	0	1	0	-		10	0
2005	Kashiwa Reysol	J1 League	19	1	2	0	2	0	-		23	1
2006	Kashiwa Reysol	J2 League	41	1	1	0	-		-		42	1
2007	Kashiwa Reysol	J1 League	25	0	0	0	6	0	-		31	0
2008	Kashiwa Reysol	J1 League	31	1	5	0	6	0	-		42	1
2009	Kashiwa Reysol	J1 League	29	0	2	0	6	0	-		37	0
2010	Kashiwa Reysol	J2 League	29	0	2	0	-		-		31	0
2011	Yokohama F. Marinos	J1 League	32	1	5	0	4	0	-		41	1
2012	Yokohama F. Marinos	J1 League	30	0	4	0	4	0	-		38	0
2013	Yokohama F. Marinos	J1 League	33	0	5	0	9	0	-		47	0
2014	Yokohama F. Marinos	J1 League	27	0	0	0	2	0	6	0	35	0
2015	Yokohama F. Marinos	J1 League	32	2	3	0	3	0	-		38	2
2016	Yokohama F. Marinos	J1 League	33	0	5	0	6	0	-		44	0
2017	Sagan Tosu	J1 League	19	0	2	0	1	0	-		22	0
2018	Sagan Tosu	J1 League	25	0	3	0	0	0	-		28	0
2019	Sagan Tosu	J1 League	16	0	0	0	1	0	-		17	0
2020	Sagan Tosu	J1 League	5	0	0	0	1	0	-		6	0
2021	Criacao Shinjuku	KSL	16	0	-		-		-		16	0
Total			451	6	39	0	52	0	6	0	548	6

== Honours ==
=== Club ===
Kashiwa Reysol

- J2 League: 2010

Yokohama F. Marinos

- Emperor's Cup: 2013
