= Yuta Mikado =

Japanese footballer

Yuta Mikado 三門 雄大
Personal information
- Full name: Yuta Mikado
- Date of birth: 26 December 1986 (age 39)
- Place of birth: Fujimi, Saitama, Japan
- Height: 1.74 m (5 ft 8 1/2 in)
- Position: Midfielder

Team information
- Current team: Kochi United SC
- Number: 78

Youth career
- –2001: Mizuhodai JSC
- 2002–2004: Fujimi Primeiro
- 2005–2008: RKU Kashiwa High School

College career
Years	Team	Apps	(Gls)
2005–2008	Ryutsu Keizai University		

Senior career*
Years	Team	Apps	(Gls)
2009–2013	Albirex Niigata	138	(7)
2014–2016	Yokohama F. Marinos	48	(4)
2016–2017	Avispa Fukuoka	58	(3)
2018–2022	Omiya Ardija	144	(4)
2022–2025	FC Imabari	92	(6)
2026–	Kochi United SC	15	(0)
- * Club domestic league appearances and goals as of 21 August 2026

Yuta Mikado (三門 雄大, Mikado Yūta; born December 26, 1986) is a Japanese footballer who plays as a midfielder, captain and currently play for J3 League club, Kochi United SC. He is a versatile player who can play any midfield position and has also played as a right back.

== Career ==
=== Youth career ===
Mikado started attending Ryutsu Keizai University in 2005, where he helped the team capture a Kantō University Championship in 2008 as well as earning Player of the Year.

=== Professional career ===
After graduation from school in 2009, Mikado signed his first professional contract with Albirex Niigata. He made his debut on 26 September 2008 in a league match against Sanfrecce Hiroshima. Mikado started the match and played 90 minutes in a 2–1 victory.

In January 2014, he was transferred to the Japanese giant Yokohama F. Marinos.

After two seasons with Marinos, Mikado transferred to Avispa Fukuoka in 2016.

In January 2018, he opted to sign for Omiya Ardija. He was appointed captain of the club for the 2020 season.

On 26 July 2022, Mikado announcement officially transfer to J3 League club, FC Imabari for mid 2022 season. On 10 November 2024, Mikado was brought his club secure promotion to J2 League for the first time in history from next season after defeat Gainare Tottori 0-5 in matchweek 36.

== Career statistics ==
=== Club ===
As of the start for 2025 season.

Appearances and goals by club, season and competition
Club	Season	League			National cup		League cup		Other		Total	
Club	Season	Division	Apps	Goals	Apps	Goals	Apps	Goals	Apps	Goals	Apps	Goals
Japan			League		Emperor's Cup		J. League Cup		Other		Total	
Albirex Niigata	2009	J. League Div 1	8	0	4	0	1	0	-		13	0
Albirex Niigata	2010	J. League Div 1	32	3	3	0	5	0	-		40	3
Albirex Niigata	2011	J. League Div 1	33	2	2	0	2	0	-		37	2
Albirex Niigata	2012	J. League Div 1	31	1	1	0	5	0	-		37	1
Albirex Niigata	2013	J. League Div 1	34	1	1	0	5	0	-		40	1
Albirex Niigata	Total		138	7	11	0	18	0	0	0	167	7
Yokohama F. Marinos	2014	J. League Div 1	13	0	0	0	1	0	4 (Note: Appearances in the AFC Champions League)	0	18	0
Yokohama F. Marinos	2015	J1 League	32	4	3	0	2	0	-		37	4
Yokohama F. Marinos	2016	J1 League	3	0	0	0	3	0	-		6	0
Yokohama F. Marinos	Total		48	4	3	0	6	0	4	0	61	4
Avispa Fukuoka	2016	J1 League	17	0	1	0	-		-		18	0
Avispa Fukuoka	2017	J2 League	41	3	1	0	-		2 (Note: Appearances in J1/J2 play-offs)	0	44	3
Avispa Fukuoka	Total		58	3	2	0	0	0	2	0	62	3
Omiya Ardija	2018	J2 League	42	1	0	0	-		1	0	43	1
Omiya Ardija	2019	J2 League	21	1	0	0	-		1	0	22	1
Omiya Ardija	2020	J2 League	31	0	0	0	-		-		31	0
Omiya Ardija	2021	J2 League	37	2	0	0	-		-		37	2
Omiya Ardija	2022	J2 League	13	0	1	0	-		-		14	0
Omiya Ardija	Total		144	4	1	0	0	0	2	0	147	4
FC Imabari	2022	J3 League	16	1	0	0	-		-		16	1
FC Imabari	2023	J3 League	38	3	2	0	-		-		40	3
FC Imabari	2024	J3 League	31	2	1	0	0	0	-		32	2
FC Imabari	2025	J2 League	0	0	0	0	0	0	-		0	0
FC Imabari	Total		85	6	3	0	0	0	0	0	88	6
Total			475	24	19	0	24	0	8	0	526	24

== Honours ==
FC Imabari

- J3 League runner-up: 2024
