= Shingo Hyodo =

Japanese footballer (born 1985)

Shingo Hyodo 兵藤 慎剛
Personal information
- Full name: Shingo Hyodo
- Date of birth: 29 July 1985 (age 41)
- Place of birth: Nagasaki, Japan
- Height: 1.71 m (5 ft 7 in)
- Position: Midfielder

Youth career
- 2001–2003: Kunimi High School

College career
Years	Team	Apps	(Gls)
2004–2007	Waseda University		

Senior career*
Years	Team	Apps	(Gls)
2008–2016	Yokohama F. Marinos	268	(32)
2017–2018	Hokkaido Consadole Sapporo	47	(2)
2019–2020	Vegalta Sendai		
2021	SC Sagamihara		

International career
2005	Japan U20	4	(0)
Medal record
Yokohama F. Marinos
Runner-up	J1 League	2013
Winner	Emperor's Cup	2013
Representing Japan
AFC U-19 Championship
Bronze medal – third place	2004 Malaysia
- * Club domestic league appearances and goals as of 10 August 2021

Shingo Hyodo (兵藤 慎剛, Hyōdō Shingō; born 29 July 1985 in Nagasaki) is a Japanese footballer who plays for SC Sagamihara.

== National team career ==
In June 2005, Hyodo was elected Japan U-20 national team for 2005 World Youth Championship. At this tournament, he wore the number 10 shirt for Japan and played all 4 matches.

== Club statistics ==
Updated to 18 February 2019.

Club performance			League		Cup		League Cup		Continental		Other		Total	
Season	Club	League	Apps	Goals	Apps	Goals	Apps	Goals	Apps	Goals	Apps	Goals	Apps	Goals
Japan			League		Emperor's Cup		J. League Cup		AFC		Other^{1}		Total	
2008	Yokohama F. Marinos	J1 League	28	2	4	1	7	0	-		-		39	3
2009	Yokohama F. Marinos	J1 League	30	1	2	0	10	1	-		-		42	2
2010	Yokohama F. Marinos	J1 League	32	6	3	0	6	1	-		-		41	7
2011	Yokohama F. Marinos	J1 League	34	6	4	1	5	1	-		-		43	8
2012	Yokohama F. Marinos	J1 League	34	4	5	1	5	1	-		-		44	6
2013	Yokohama F. Marinos	J1 League	33	7	5	2	10	1	-		-		48	8
2014	Yokohama F. Marinos	J1 League	31	3	1	1	2	0	5	1	1	0	40	5
2015	Yokohama F. Marinos	J1 League	28	1	2	0	5	0	-		-		35	1
2016	Yokohama F. Marinos	J1 League	18	2	2	0	8	1	-		-		28	3
2017	Hokkaido Consadole Sapporo	J1 League	32	2	0	0	1	0	-		-		33	2
2018	Hokkaido Consadole Sapporo	J1 League	15	0	2	0	4	0	-		-		21	0
Career total			315	34	30	6	63	6	5	1	1	0	414	47

^{1}Includes Japanese Super Cup.

== Honours ==
Yokohama F. Marinos

- Emperor's Cup: 2013
